= Davis v. Ayala =

- Supreme Court of the United States

Argued March 3, 2015 Decided June 18, 2015
- Full case name: Ron Davis, Acting Warden, Petitioner v. Hector Ayala
- Docket no.: 13–1428
- Citations: 576 U.S. 257 (more) 135 S. Ct. 2187; 192 L. Ed. 2d 323
- Argument: Oral argument

Case history
- Prior: Convictions and sentences upheld, People v. Ayala, 24 Cal. 4th 243, 6 P.3d 193, 99 Cal. Rptr. 2d 532 (2000); rehearing denied (Cal., November 15, 2000); cert. denied, Ayala v. California, 532 U.S. 1029 (2001); habeas corpus denied, Ayala v. Ayers, 02cv1322-IEG(PCL) (S.D. Cal., February 17, 2009); certificate of appealability granted in part, denied in part, Ayala v. Wong, 2009 WL 1357416 (S.D. Cal., May 13, 2009); reversed and remanded, 693 F.3d 945 (9th Cir. 2012); withdrawn and superseded, 730 F.3d 831 (9th Cir. 2013); amended and superseded on denial of rehearing en banc, 756 F.3d 656 (9th Cir. 2014); cert. granted, Chappell v. Ayala, 574 U.S. 958 (2014).
- Subsequent: Rehearing denied, Davis v. Ayala, 576 U.S. 1087 (2015); affirmed on remand, Ayala v. Davis, 813 F.3d 880 (9th Cir. 2016).

Holding
- When a state trial court has reviewed for harmlessness under Chapman v. California federal courts must apply AEDPA § 2254(d).

Court membership
- Chief Justice John Roberts Associate Justices Antonin Scalia · Anthony Kennedy; Clarence Thomas · Ruth Bader Ginsburg; Stephen Breyer · Samuel Alito; Sonia Sotomayor · Elena Kagan

Case opinions
- Majority: Alito, joined by Roberts, Scalia, Kennedy, Thomas
- Concurrence: Kennedy
- Concurrence: Thomas
- Dissent: Sotomayor, joined by Ginsburg, Breyer, Kagan

Laws applied
- Antiterrorism and Effective Death Penalty Act of 1996, 28 U.S.C. § 2254(d)

Davis v. Ayala, 576 U.S. 257 (2015), was a case in which the United States Supreme Court upheld a death sentence of a Hispanic defendant despite the fact that all Blacks and Hispanics were rejected from the jury during the defendant's trial.

The case involved a habeas corpus petition submitted by Hector Ayala, who was arrested and tried in the late 1980s for the alleged murder of three individuals during an attempted robbery of an automobile body shop in San Diego, California in April 1985. At trial, the prosecution used peremptory challenges to strike all Black and Hispanic jurors who were available for jury service. The trial court judge allowed the prosecution to explain the basis for the peremptory challenges outside the presence of Ayala's counsel and did not give the defense an opportunity to respond. Ayala was ultimately sentenced to death, but he filed several appeals challenging the constitutionality of the trial court's decision to exclude his counsel from the hearings.

In a 5–4 opinion written by Justice Samuel Alito, the Supreme Court held that even if the trial court committed error, the error was harmless and that Ayala did not suffer any actual prejudice. Justice Sonia Sotomayor wrote a dissenting opinion in which she argued that Ayala's sentence should be reversed because the exclusion of Ayala's counsel from the hearings "substantially influenced the outcome" of the case. Additionally, Justice Anthony Kennedy wrote a separate concurring opinion in which he questioned the propriety of Ayala's placement in solitary confinement. In response, Justice Clarence Thomas wrote a one-paragraph concurring opinion in which he stated that Ayala's accommodations were "far sight more spacious than those in which his victims ... now rest".

Commentators have described the case as "important" and note that will likely have a "significant effect" on similar cases in the future. However, some analysts have described the outcome as "particularly unjust".

Justice Kennedy's concurring opinion also received significant coverage from the media, and some analysts suggested that solitary confinement may become a "new battleground"for Justice Kennedy One commentator described Justice Kennedy's concurring opinion as "the single most surprising and heartening development of the term".

== Legal Background ==
=== Batson challenges ===
In Batson v. Kentucky, the Supreme Court of the United States held that a violation of the Equal Protection Clause of the Fourteenth Amendment to the United States Constitution occurs when prosecutors use peremptory challenges to exclude jurors on the basis of race. If a defendant alleges that a prosecutor challenged a prospective juror on the basis of that juror's race (a process known as a "Batson challenge"), trial courts will conduct a three-part analysis of the peremptory challenge in question: "First, a defendant must make a prima facie showing that a peremptory challenge has been exercised on the basis of race; second, if that showing has been made, the prosecution must offer a race-neutral basis for striking the juror in question; and third, in light of the parties’ submissions, the trial court must determine whether the defendant has shown purposeful discrimination."

=== Habeas statute ===
When individuals are convicted for crimes under state law, certain post-conviction processes are available to challenge the constitutionality of their convictions in state and federal courts. By granting a writ of habeas corpus, a federal court may overturn the conviction of a state court if it finds the trial was unfair or constitutionally defective.

However, in the wake of the Oklahoma City bombing, the United States Congress passed the Antiterrorism and Effective Death Penalty Act ("AEDPA") in 1996 to modify federal habeas corpus procedures. Under the AEDPA's new standards, when a prisoner's claim has been adjudicated in state court, that individual's petition for habeas corpus shall not be granted unless the state court decision "was contrary to, or involved an unreasonable application of, clearly established Federal law, as determined by the Supreme Court of the United States".

In 2011 the Supreme Court decided Harrington v. Richter, requiring AEDPA's deferential standard be applied under § 2254(d) to any claim that has already been "adjudicated on the merits".

=== "Harmless error" after AEDPA ===
The Supreme Court of the United States has identified a narrow range of errors that require automatic reversal; for all other errors, the decision of a lower court will be upheld if the error was harmless. In 2007, the United States Supreme Court held in Fry v. Pliler that, as a "precondition" for relief under the AEDPA, habeas petitioners must demonstrate evidence that a state court's error resulted in "actual prejudice". In 1967, the Supreme Court ruled in Chapman v. California that a constitutional error will only be considered harmless when the court is "able to declare a belief that it was harmless beyond a reasonable doubt".

Additionally, when reviewing federal habeas corpus petitions, a federal court may only grant relief if there is "grave doubt about whether a trial error of federal law had substantial and injurious effect or influence in determining the jury's verdict".

After Fry federal courts review for harmless error under the Brecht v. Abrahamson standard only when state courts have not reviewed for harmless error. The Supreme Court has also ruled that when reviewing a state court's determination of harmlessness under Chapman, the AEDPA mandates that the reviewing court may not grant a petition for habeas corpus "unless the harmlessness determination itself was unreasonable".

== Arrest and Trial of Hector Ayala ==
Hector Ayala was convicted of committing multiple murders arising from an attempted robbery of an automobile body shop in San Diego, California in April 1985.

During jury selection, the prosecution used peremptory challenges to strike all Black and Hispanic jurors who were available for jury service. Ayala's attorney's filed a series of Batson challenges to contest the prosecution's use of peremptory challenges, but the judge ruled that the prosecution had valid reasons for excluding those jurors that were not based on race. The trial judge permitted the prosecution to explain the basis of their peremptory challenges in a closed hearing, outside the presence of Ayala's counsel, "so as not to disclose trial strategy". The denial of Ayala's Sixth Amendment right to counsel would later form the basis of his federal habeas claim. The jury returned a sentence of death for the three murder convictions, and the trial judge entered a judgment consistent with the jury's sentence.

On direct appeal, the California Supreme Court upheld Ayala's conviction and sentence. The state court said the trial court's ruling that allowing a closed hearing was a harmless error under state law, and that if federal error occurred, it would similarly be a harmless error under federal law. Ayala subsequently filed a petition for habeas corpus, which was denied by a district court judge in 2006. On appeal, the United States Court of Appeals for the Ninth Circuit granted Ayala's habeas petition in 2013. The Antiterrorism and Effective Death Penalty Act applied, and as neither the state court nor district court had decided whether the closed hearing violated federal law, the Ninth Circuit ruled on the merits, holding that Ayala was denied due process at trial and that the trial court's error was not harmless.

In 2014, the Supreme Court of the United States granted certiorari to review the Ninth Circuit's decision under AEDPA § 2254(d) and Brecht.

== Supreme Court ==
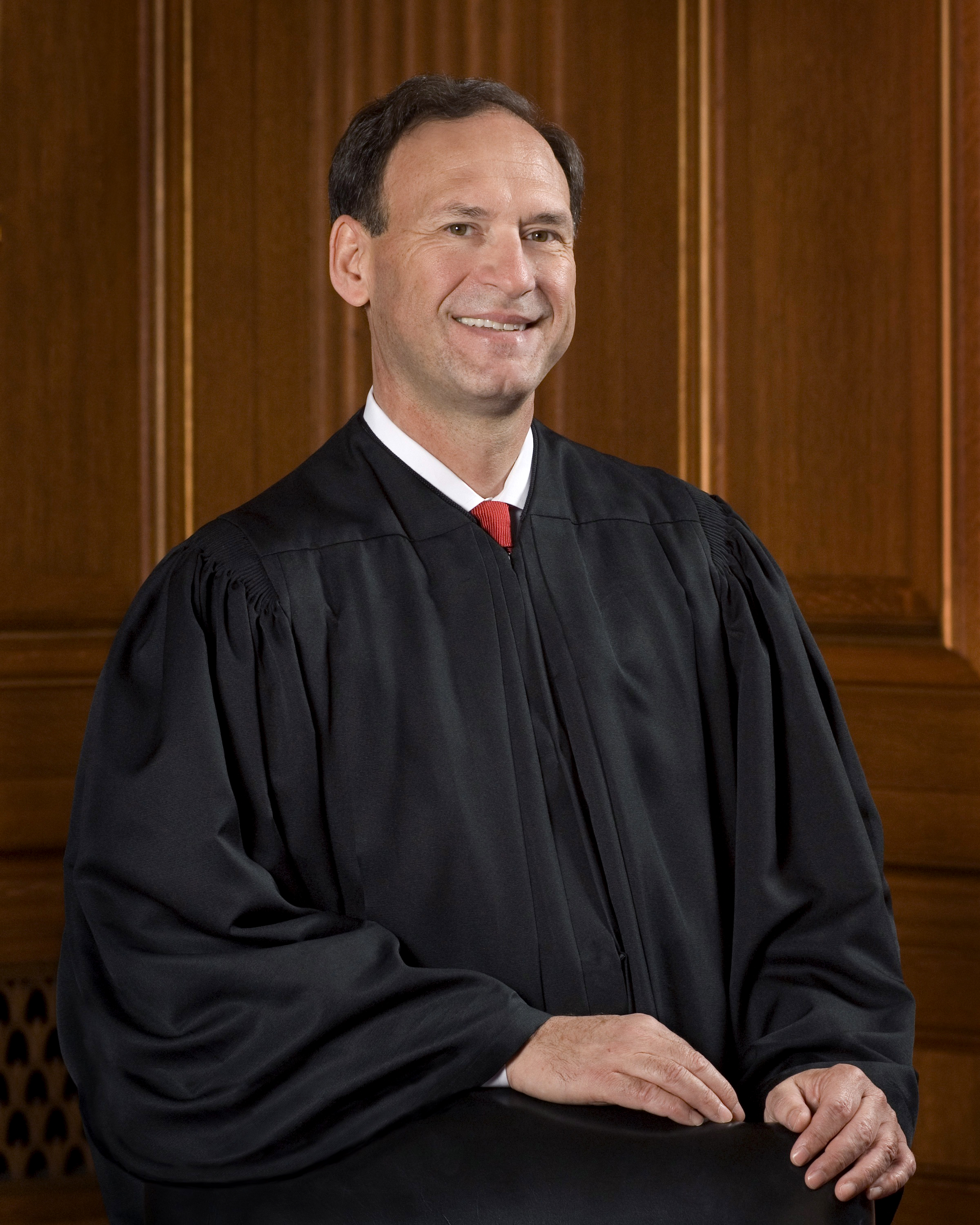
In his majority opinion, Justice Samuel Alito (pictured) held that Ayala did not suffer "actual prejudice".

=== Arguments ===
The state of California argued that Richter should apply in this case to prevent federal courts from setting aside state judgments under AEDPA's deferential standard. Ayala's defense argued that Richter only applied to ineffective assistance of counsel claims.

=== Opinion of the Court ===
In his majority opinion, Justice Samuel Alito held that the exclusion of Ayala's counsel during the Batson hearings was harmless error. Justice Alito emphasized that under federal law, prisoners are not entitled to habeas relief unless they can demonstrate "actual prejudice". Additionally, Justice Alito noted that under the Antiterrorism and Effective Death Penalty Act, federal courts should be "highly deferential" to state courts when a habeas claim has been "adjudicated on the merits" in state court".

Applying these standards to the facts of this case, Justice Alito ruled that Ayala did not suffer any actual prejudice and that the California Supreme Court's opinion "represented an entirely reasonable application of controlling precedent". Consequently, Justice Alito held that the Ninth Circuit's ruling should be reversed and that the case should be remanded for reconsideration in light of the Supreme Court's decision.

=== Concurring opinions ===
Although he noted that his support for the majority's opinion was "unqualified", Justice Anthony Kennedy wrote a separate concurring opinion in which he questioned the propriety of solitary confinement. Justice Kennedy observed that since 1989, Ayala had spent more than twenty five years in solitary confinement.

Although the conditions of Ayala's confinement were not established in the record, Justice Kennedy wrote that "it is likely [he] has been held for all or most of the past 20 years or more in a windowless cell no larger than a typical parking spot for 23 hours a day; and in the one hour when he leaves it, he likely is allowed little or no opportunity for conversation or interaction with anyone".

Justice Kennedy wrote that "[t]he human toll wrought by extended terms of isolation long has been understood, and questioned, by writers and commentators" and that solitary confinement "bears a further terror and peculiar mark of infamy". Justice Kennedy conceded that "in some instances temporary, solitary confinement is a useful or necessary means to impose discipline and to protect prison employees and other inmates", but that courts should ultimately determine "whether workable alternative systems for long-term confinement exist, and, if so, whether a correctional system should be required to adopt them".

Justice Clarence Thomas wrote a separate, one-paragraph concurring opinion to respond to Justice Kennedy's concurring opinion. He wrote that the "accommodations in which Ayala is housed are a far sight more spacious than those in which his victims, Ernesto Dominguez Mendez, Marcos Antonio Zamora, and Jose Luis Rositas, now rest". Justice Thomas also noted that because Ayala's victims were all 31 years of age or younger, "Ayala will soon have had as much or more time to enjoy those accommodations as his victims had time to enjoy this Earth".

=== Justice Sotomayor's dissenting opinion ===
Justice Sonia Sotomayor wrote a dissenting opinion in which she was joined by Justice Ruth Bader Ginsburg, Justice Stephen Breyer, and Justice Elena Kagan. Justice Sotomayor argued that the exclusion of Ayala's counsel from the Batson hearings "substantially influenced the outcome" of the case and that "grave doubt exists as to whether [the exclusion] was harmless". She critiqued Justice Alito's methodological approach, arguing that "[t]he proper inquiry is not whether the trial court’s determination can be sustained, but whether it may have been different had counsel been present". Considering the evidence presented in this case, Justice Sotomayor concluded that there "is neither a factual nor a legal basis for the Court’s confidence" that the prosecution's use of peremptory challenges was race neutral. She argued that in light of "the strength of Ayala’s prima facie case", the Court should have upheld the Ninth Circuit's ruling.

== Commentary and analysis ==
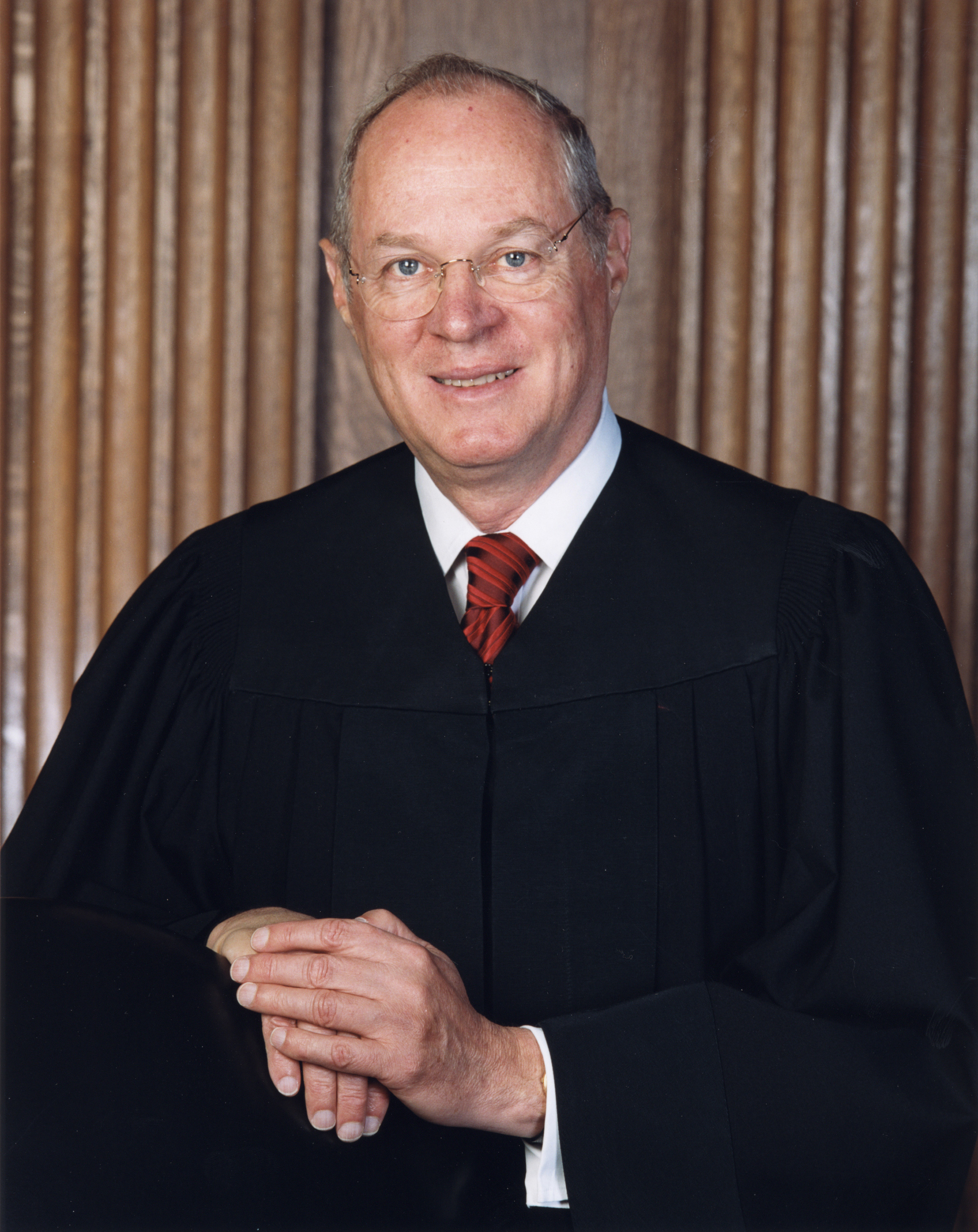
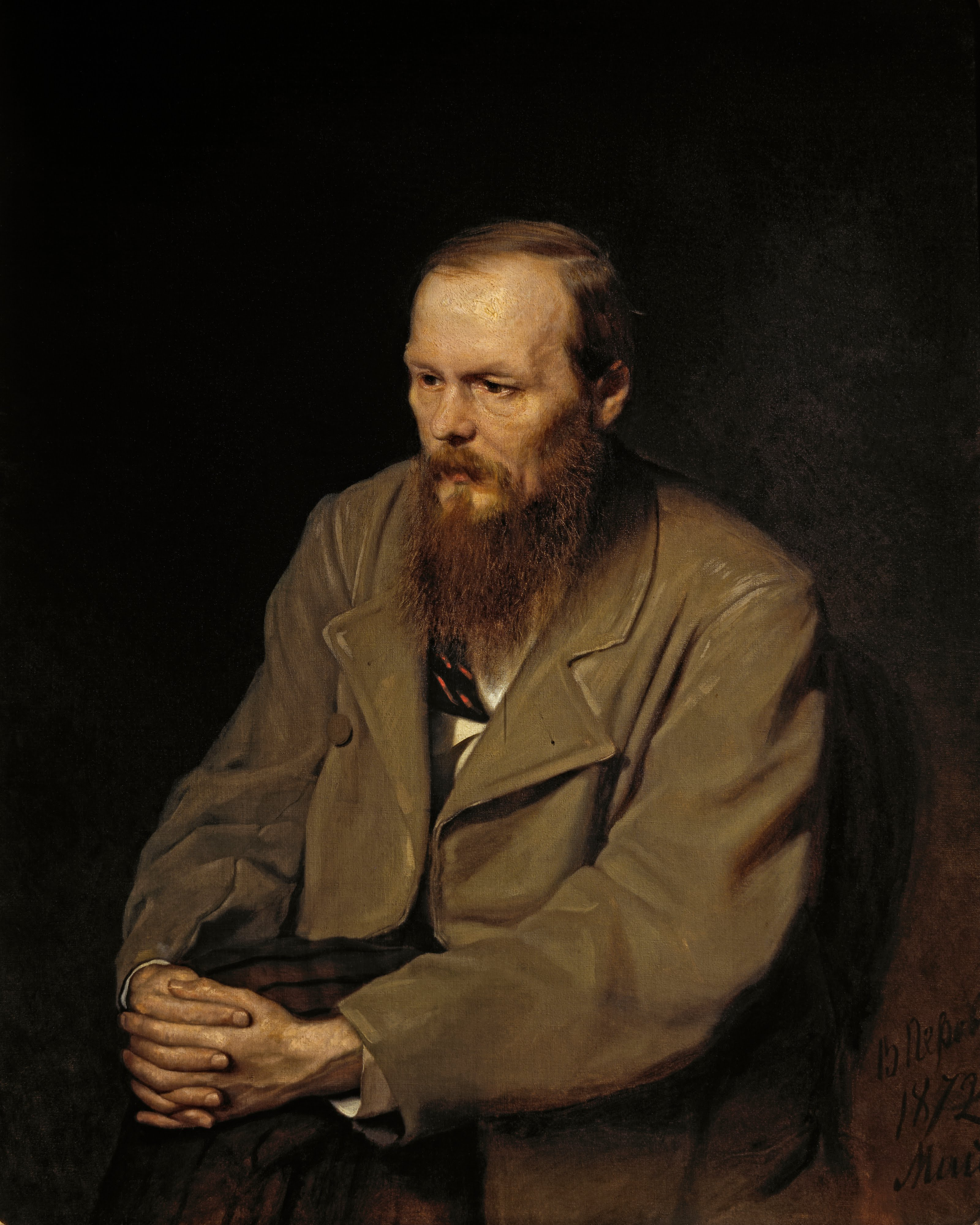
In his concurring opinion, Justice Anthony Kennedy (pictured left) cited Fyodor Dostoyevsky's (pictured right) observation that "[t]he degree of civilization in a society can be judged by entering its prisons". Justice Kennedy wrote that "[t]here is truth to this in our own time".

Following the release of the Court's opinion, commentators described Davis v. Ayala as "an important case raising claims about jury selection and harmless error". Steve Vladeck wrote that "[g]oing forward, the dispute between the majority and dissent will have an especially significant effect on cases in which trial courts conduct Batson proceedings ex parte". Hadar Aviram wrote that "[t]he Court was willing to accept, as a basic premise, that Ayala's constitutional rights were violated; but that is not enough to merit a reversal". In his review of the case for The New Yorker, Lincoln Caplan described the Court's opinion as "particularly unjust" because the Court "had the opportunity to hold a state prosecutor to account for using trumped-up reasons to justify racial discrimination in a jury selection" but failed to do so.

=== Commentary about Justice Kennedy's concurring opinion ===
Much of the initial commentary about the case focused on Justice Kennedy's concurring opinion. Writing for the Los Angeles Times, David G. Savage described Justice Kennedy's opinion as "unusual" and "a rare instance of a Supreme Court justice virtually inviting a constitutional challenge to a prison policy". Marty Lederman described Justice Kennedy's concurring opinion as "the single most surprising and heartening development of the term". Matt Ford wrote that "Kennedy’s critique of solitary confinement in Davis came without warning or fanfare" and that "[s]olitary confinement is a new battleground for the Court’s second-longest serving justice, but not a surprising one".

Although he suggested Justice Kennedy's concurrence may be "more consequential" than Justice Harry Blackmun's dissent in Callins v. Collins, Mark Joseph Stern described Justice Kennedy's concurrence as "myopic", noting that "large chunks of the 'legal academy' in the 'public' were aware—and outraged—by the practice long before Kennedy condemned it". Dahlia Lithwick wrote that even though "Kennedy may not come around on the death penalty" and rule it unconstitutional, "after reading his own words in Ayala—he probably should". In an interview with Harvard Law School dean Martha Minow, Justice Kennedy explained that when he was in the Army, he was locked in a cell for four hours and "slightly tortured". Justice Kennedy remarked that "[a]fter four hours in a cell, I was going mad. These people are in, some for 40 years. It drives people mad and we don’t even think about it. We’ve got to do something about it".

== See also ==
- List of United States Supreme Court cases, volume 576
- List of United States Supreme Court cases
- Lists of United States Supreme Court cases by volume
- List of United States Supreme Court cases by the Roberts Court
