= Brown v. Davenport =

- Supreme Court of the United States

Argued October 5, 2021 Decided April 21, 2022
- Full case name: Mike Brown, Acting Warden v. Ervine Davenport
- Docket no.: 20-826
- Citations: 596 U.S. 118 (more)
- Argument: Oral argument

Case history
- Prior: Davenport v. MacLaren

Holding
- When a state court has ruled on the merits of a state prisoner’s claim, a federal court cannot grant habeas relief without applying both the test this Court outlined in Brecht v. Abrahamson, 507 U.S. 619, and the one Congress prescribed in the Antiterrorism and Effective Death Penalty Act of 1996; the Sixth Circuit erred in granting habeas relief to Mr. Davenport based solely on its assessment that he could satisfy the Brecht standard.

Court membership
- Chief Justice John Roberts Associate Justices Clarence Thomas · Stephen Breyer; Samuel Alito · Sonia Sotomayor; Elena Kagan · Neil Gorsuch; Brett Kavanaugh · Amy Coney Barrett

Case opinions
- Majority: Gorsuch, joined by Roberts, Thomas, Alito, Kavanaugh, Barrett
- Dissent: Kagan, joined by Breyer, Sotomayor

Laws applied
- Antiterrorism and Effective Death Penalty Act of 1996

Brown v. Davenport, 596 U.S. 118 (2022), was a case decided by the United States Supreme Court. The case concerned whether habeas relief may be granted if the Brecht v. Abrahamson test alone is satisfied, or if the application of Chapman v. California by the state courts was unreasonable because of the AEDPA. The court held that federal courts can not grant habeas relief when state courts have already ruled on a prisoner's claim, unless the situation satisfies the test laid out in Brecht v. Abrahamson, and the exceptions to the AEDPA's §2254(d) jurisdictional bar.

== Background ==
In 2008, Ervine Davenport was convicted of first-degree murder. He challenged the conviction because during his trial he had been placed in shackles. His wrists, waist, and ankles were all restrained, but there was a curtain to prevent the jury from seeing the shackles. The state said that although the shackles were unconstitutional, they did not affect the jury's verdict. Michigan's Court of Appeals agreed with the state. The Michigan Supreme Court disagreed, however, after several jurors testified that they had seen the shackles or heard comments about them, and then sent the case back to the lower courts. The lower court again determined that the shackles did not affect the verdict, and the appellate court agreed with the state once again, and the Michigan Supreme Court denied an appeal.

Davenport then challenged his conviction in the federal courts. The district court denied his claim under 28 U.S.C. § 2254(d) which limits federal jurisdiction over claims that have already been decided by state courts with only two narrow exceptions where a state court unreasonably applies or makes a decision contrary to clearly established federal law, or bases their decision on an unreasonable determination of facts. The District Court found that the state court correctly identified and applied the controlling rule from Chapman v. California.

The U.S. Court of Appeals for the 6th Circuit agreed the hear the case. The appeals court decided to apply Brecht v. Abrahamson instead of AEDPA. Persuaded that Davenport could satisfy the Brecht standard because "shackling is 'inherently prejudicial'", the court found that the state had not met the burden of proof necessary to show that the jury was not influenced by the shackling, and provided habeas relief, over the dissent of Judge Chad Readler.

The state attempted to have the decision stayed, but the court declined.

== Supreme Court ==
The majority opinion was written by Justice Neil Gorsuch. The dissent was written by Justice Elena Kagan.

=== Opinion ===
The Court begins by reviewing the history of habeas corpus, citing Paul Bator's well-known and influential paper claiming there is a state interest in the finality of state court judgments, and select case law to make the point that the presumption of authority favored state courts until 1953, when the Supreme Court's Brown v. Allen decision, holding that state court judgments are not res judicata ("a matter decided"), laid the groundwork for the expansion of constitutional protections for state prisoners during the rights revolution.

The era of modern law enforcement brought with it an increase of frivolous habeas claims. Over time, Supreme Court decisions made it more difficult for petitioners to meet procedural default rules to prevent what came to be known as "abuse of the writ". Brecht was one of those pre-AEDPA decisions emphasizing federalism and the finality of state court judgments.

Meeting the Brecht standard did not automatically imply an unreasonable application by a state court of "clearly established Federal law as determined by the Supreme Court of the United States", a very high jurisdictional bar that is required by the AEDPA, the Court said, concluding that the Sixth Circuit was in error by granting relief.
