= Arizona v. Fulminante =

- Supreme Court of the United States

Argued October 10, 1990 Decided March 26, 1991
- Full case name: Arizona v. Fulminante
- Docket no.: 89-839
- Citations: 499 U.S. 279 (more) 111 S. Ct. 1246; 113 L. Ed. 2d 302
- Argument: Oral argument

Case history
- Prior: 161 Ariz. 237, 778 P.2d 602

Holding
- (1) The harmless error rule is applicable to the admission of involuntary confessions. (2) The admission of a confession in this case was not a harmless error.

Court membership
- Chief Justice William Rehnquist Associate Justices Byron White · Thurgood Marshall; Harry Blackmun · John P. Stevens; Sandra Day O'Connor · Antonin Scalia; Anthony Kennedy · David Souter

Case opinions
- Majority: White (Parts I, II, IV), joined by Marshall, Blackmun, Stevens; Scalia (Parts I, II); Kennedy (Parts I, IV)
- Majority: Rehnquist (Part II), joined by O'Connor, Scalia, Kennedy, Souter
- Concurrence: White (Part III), joined by Marshall, Blackmun, and Stevens
- Concurrence: Kennedy (in the judgment)
- Dissent: Rehnquist (Parts I, III), joined by O'Connor; Scalia (Part III); Kennedy, Souter (Part I)

Laws applied
- U.S. Const. amends. V, XIV, Chapman v. California

Arizona v. Fulminante, 499 U.S. 279 (1991), was a United States Supreme Court case clarifying the standard of review of a criminal defendant's allegedly coerced confession. The ruling was divided into parts, with various justices voting in different ways on different points of law, but ultimately 1) the defendant's confession was ruled involuntary, 2) the harmless error rule had to be applied, and 3) in this case, use of the confession as evidence was not harmless.

== Background ==
=== Factual background ===
In 1982, Jeneane Michelle Hunt, the 11-year-old stepdaughter of Oreste Fulminante, was murdered in Mesa, Arizona. Fulminante reported her missing on September 14, and her body was found September 16 with two bullet wounds to the head; the body had decomposed so much that forensic testing couldn't determine whether a sexual assault had happened. Fulminante became a suspect because of inconsistencies in his statements to police, but was not yet charged before he left the state for New Jersey.

In October, police uncovered that he had a felony criminal record, and had traded a rifle for a spare revolver barrel on September 13. After this information was shared with the federal Bureau of Alcohol, Tobacco, and Firearms, Fulminante was arrested in Newark for illegally possessing a weapon. He would be convicted, serve time in a federal prison in Missouri, be released, then be arrested and convicted on another firearm-possession charge, and then sent to serve his term in Ray Brook Federal Correctional Institution in New York.

While in Ray Brook prison (now in 1983), Fulminante met Anthony Sarivola, a fellow inmate, who was also a confidential informant for the Federal Bureau of Investigation. Rumors had spread that Fulminante had killed a child; Sarivola told Fulminante he had connections to organized crime, and offered Fulminante protection from "rough treatment" in prison in exchange for a confession to the murder of Fulminante's stepdaughter. Fulminante agreed, confessing to Sarivola that he murdered his stepdaughter; he admitted to driving her out to the desert on his motorcycle, sexually assaulting her, choking her, making her plead for her life, and shooting her with his .357 revolver. He also said he'd hidden the weapon at the crime scene. After his release in May 1984, he made a comment in front of Sarivola's wife that "he could not return to his home because he had killed a little girl in Arizona."

=== Trial ===
After his confessions, Fulminante was charged with the murder, and his confession to Sarivola was used against him at trial. Fulminante was indicted in September 1984, and would be convicted in December 1985. Fulminante made a motion to suppress the confession on the basis that it was coerced—Fulminante had felt he'd have been subject to violence from other inmates had he not confessed—but the trial court denied the motion. Fulminante was sentenced to death.

=== Appeal ===
Fulminante appealed to the Arizona Supreme Court. Although it denied most of his grounds for reversal, the Court agreed that the first confession was coerced. However, it noted that the second confession, made casually to Sarivola as he was being released, lacked the coercion of the first, and was separate enough not to be implicated by the "fruit of the poisonous tree" doctrine. In its initial ruling, the Court applied the harmless error rule from Chapman v. California, and held that even if the first confession was a problem (and it certainly was), Fulminante would easily have been convicted based on the second confession alone, and thus the use of the first was harmless error.

In a motion for reconsideration, however, Fulminante successfully argued that the harmless error rule should not apply to involuntary confessions. The Court noted in a supplemental opinion that the case law it had relied on was all focused on Miranda warnings, not confessions, and there was other case law that said involuntary confessions could never be harmless. The Court therefore ordered a new trial. The state of Arizona appealed to the U.S. Supreme Court.

== Opinion of the Court ==
The U.S. Supreme Court affirmed in a 5–4 vote. Justices White, Rehnquist, and Kennedy each wrote opinions. White's opinion was written in 4 parts, with six justices agreeing on Part I (White, Marshall, Blackmun, Stevens, Scalia, and Kennedy), five on Part II (of the six, Kennedy disagreed with this part), and five on Part IV (Scalia disagreed), but only four on Part III (neither Scalia nor Kennedy agreed). Rehnquist's opinion was written in 3 parts, with five justices agreeing on Part II (Rehnquist, O'Connor, Scalia, Kennedy, and Souter), but only three on Part I (Rehnquist, Kennedy, and Souter), and a different three on Part III (Rehnquist, O'Connor, and Scalia). Kennedy's separate opinion is simply a concurrence, and was joined by no one else.

Ultimately, the opinion of the court is constituted by those parts that garnered a majority: Parts I, II, and IV of White's opinion, and Part II of Rehnquist's opinion. Part III of White's opinion counts as a concurrence, because it reaches the same result as the majority, but on different grounds. The result the Court reached was that 1) the confession was ruled involuntary, 2) the harmless error rule had to be applied to the use of involuntary confessions as evidence, and 3) the use of the confession in this case was not harmless.

=== White's opinion ===
==== Parts I, II, and IV (joined by a majority) ====
Justice White argued that Fulminante was entitled to a new trial, and this was the result that gained five votes. Part I of his opinion recited the factual and procedural background of the case, and stated simply that "[a]lthough a majority of this Court finds that such a confession is subject to a harmless-error analysis, for the reasons set forth below, we affirm the judgment of the Arizona court."

Part II upheld the Arizona Supreme Court's finding that the confession was coerced. It was agreed by all parties that the proper way to review the voluntariness of a confession was a "totality of the circumstances" test (following Schneckloth v. Bustamonte), but the state argued that the Arizona Supreme Court had actually applied a "but-for" test, i.e. that Fulminante would not have confessed except for Sarivola's promise of protection. However, White said that the Arizona court's opinion had properly reviewed an array of relevant factors, and although it was "close," he agreed that Fulminante faced "a credible threat of physical violence."

Although White argued (in Part III) that the harmless error rule did not apply in this case, he wrote in Part IV that, if it were applied, the proper conclusion was that the state of Arizona had failed to prove harmless error. Part IV highlighted three relevant factors. First, the prosecution had emphasized in its opening argument that the confession was the most important evidence. Second, the credibility of Sarivola's wife Donna (who testified about the second confession) was severely undermined without the context and corroboration of the first confession. Third, a variety of other evidence against Fulminante would not have been relevant without the first confession, and therefore could not have been used in court. Since the state had not shown that the first confession did not contribute to the conviction, the error was not harmless, and a new trial was necessary.

==== Part III (concurring in the result) ====
In Part III, White, joined by Marshall, Blackmun, and Stevens, argued that use of an involuntary confession as evidence can never be harmless error:

The Court has repeatedly stressed that the view that the admission of a coerced confession can be harmless error because of the other evidence to support the verdict is "an impermissible doctrine," for "the admission in evidence, over objection, of the coerced confession vitiates the judgment because it violates the Due Process Clause of the Fourteenth Amendment." As the decisions in Haynes and Payne show, the rule was the same even when another confession of the defendant had been properly admitted into evidence. Today, a majority of the Court, without any justification, overrules this vast body of precedent without a word and in so doing dislodges one of the fundamental tenets of our criminal justice system. [citations to 16 cases omitted]

— Arizona v. Fulminante, 499 U.S. at 288 (Justice White, Part III, concurring in the result)

=== Rehnquist's opinion ===
==== Part II (joined by a majority) ====
In Part II of his opinion, joined by O'Connor, Scalia, Kennedy, and Souter, Chief Justice Rehnquist argued that the harmless error rule should apply to the use of involuntary confessions as evidence. Since the Chapman v. California decision had been issued, which officially declared the federal harmless error rule, a wide variety of errors and constitutional violations had been made subject to it; Rehnquist broadly categorized these all as "trial errors." While it was true that the Chapman decision acknowledged that some violations of the constitution could never be harmless, Rehnquist argued that it did not make sense to lump involuntary confessions in with the others:

The admission of an involuntary confession—a classic "trial error"—is markedly different from the other two constitutional violations referred to in the Chapman footnote as not being subject to harmless-error analysis. One of those violations, involved in Gideon v. Wainwright, 372 U. S. 335 (1963), was the total deprivation of the right to counsel at trial. The other violation, involved in Tumey v. Ohio, 273 U. S. 510 (1927), was a judge who was not impartial. These are structural defects in the constitution of the trial mechanism, which defy analysis by "harmless-error" standards.

— Arizona v. Fulminante, 499 U.S. at 309 (Chief Justice Rehnquist, Part II, writing for the majority)

==== Parts I and III (dissent) ====
In Part I of his opinion, Rehnquist (joined by Kennedy and Souter) argued that the first confession was voluntary, and thus there was no problem with its use as evidence. Rehnquist argued that the situation was clearly different from custodial interrogations, where a suspect might fear abuse by police. He also did not see anything in the record that actually stated that Fulminante feared violence at the hands of other inmates, especially since "Fulminante was an experienced habitue of prisons and presumably able to fend for himself."

In Part III, (joined by O'Connor and Scalia), Rehnquist stated that if the first confession were ruled involuntary, he would agree with the initial opinion of the Arizona Supreme Court, namely that the second confession rendered the use of the first harmless error.

=== Kennedy's concurrence ===
Kennedy agreed with Rehnquist that the confession was voluntary. However, he acknowledged that a majority of justices thought it was involuntary, so he thought it appropriate to give his opinion on whether it was harmless error (assuming it was involuntary), and he felt that it could not be harmless. He thus voted in favor of granting a new trial:

In the interests of providing a clear mandate to the Arizona Supreme Court in this capital case, I deem it proper to accept in the case now before us the holding of five Justices that the confession was coerced and inadmissible. I agree with a majority of the Court that admission of the confession could not be harmless error when viewed in light of all the other evidence; and so I concur in the judgment to affirm the ruling of the Arizona Supreme Court.

— Arizona v. Fulminante, 499 U.S. at 314 (Justice Kennedy, concurring)

== Further proceedings ==
The case was remanded to the state of Arizona which duly indicted Fulminante a second time. He was convicted a second time, this time without the use of either confession (although the Sarivola confession was presented to the grand jury which returned the indictment). However, in 1999 the Arizona Supreme Court once again remanded to the trial court for a new trial, this time due to the prosecution presenting hearsay statements by the victim allegedly describing her fear of the defendant. Because the Arizona Supreme Court found this to be prejudicial error, they did not address other issues raised on appeal (namely, the prosecution's failure to timely disclose physical evidence to the defense).

== In popular culture ==
Interpretation of the Fulminante decision is a major plot element in the Law & Order episode "Confession".

== See also ==
- Chapman v. California, 386 U.S. 18 (1967)
- Premo v. Moore, (2011)
