= Premo v. Moore =

- Supreme Court of the United States

Argued October 12, 2010 Decided January 19, 2011
- Full case name: Jeff Premo, Superintendent, Oregon State Penitentiary v. Randy Joseph Moore
- Docket no.: 09-658
- Citations: 562 U.S. 115 (more) 131 S. Ct. 733; 178 L. Ed. 2d 649; 2011 U.S. LEXIS 910; 79 U.S.L.W. 4038; 22 Fla. L. Weekly Fed. S 749

Case history
- Prior: Defendant convicted, unreported, affirmed sub nom. State v. Moore, 951 P.2d 204 (Or. Ct. App. 1997), review denied, 943 P.2d 395 (Or. 1998); state petition for relief rejected, unreported, affirmed sub nom. Moore v. Palmateer, 26 P.2d 191 (Or. Ct. App. 2001), rev. denied, 30 P.3d 1184 (Or. 2001); petition for habeas relief denied sub nom. Moore v. Czerniak, CV-01-01795-AJB/JMS (D. Or.), reversed and remanded, 534 F.3d 1128 (9th Cir. 2008), opinion withdrawn and replaced with petitions for rehearing denied, 574 F.3d 1092 (9th Cir. 2009); certiorari granted sub nom. Premo v. Moore 559 U.S. ___

Holding
- Applying AEDPA, the state-court decision was not an unreasonable application of either part of the Strickland rule.

Court membership
- Chief Justice John Roberts Associate Justices Antonin Scalia · Anthony Kennedy; Clarence Thomas · Ruth Bader Ginsburg; Stephen Breyer · Samuel Alito; Sonia Sotomayor · Elena Kagan

Case opinions
- Majority: Kennedy, joined by Roberts, Scalia, Thomas, Breyer, Alito, Sotomayor
- Concurrence: Ginsburg (in judgment)
- Kagan took no part in the consideration or decision of the case.

Laws applied
- Antiterrorism and Effective Death Penalty Act

Premo v. Moore, 562 U.S. 115 (2011), is a United States Supreme Court case involving the right of individuals to federal habeas corpus relief on state-law claims. In a unanimous ruling, the court held that habeas relief may not be granted with respect to any claim that a state-court has found on the merits unless the state-court decision denying relief involves an "unreasonable application" of "clearly established federal law, as determined by" the Court.

== Background ==
Respondent Moore and two accomplices attacked a man, tied him up, and threw him in the trunk of a car before driving into the Oregon countryside, where Moore fatally shot him. Afterwards, Moore and one accomplice told Moore's brother and the accomplice's girlfriend that they had intended to scare Rogers, but that Moore had accidentally shot him. Moore and the accomplice repeated this account to the police. On the advice of counsel, Moore agreed to plead no contest to felony murder in exchange for the minimum sentence for that offense. He later sought postconviction relief in state court, claiming that he had been denied effective assistance of counsel. Moore complained that his lawyer had not moved to suppress his confession to police in advance of the lawyer's advice that Moore considered before accepting the plea offer. The court concluded the suppression motion would have been fruitless in light of Moore's other admissible confession to two witnesses. Counsel gave that as his reason for not making the motion. He added that he had advised Moore that, because of the abuse Rogers suffered before the shooting, Moore could be charged with aggravated murder. That crime was punishable by death or life in prison without parole. These facts led the state court to conclude Moore had not established ineffective assistance of counsel under Strickland v. Washington (1984). Moore sought federal habeas relief, renewing his ineffective-assistance claim. The District Court denied the petition, but the Ninth Circuit reversed, holding that the state court's conclusion was an unreasonable application of clearly established law in light of Strickland and was contrary to Arizona v. Fulminante (1991).
