= Fry v. Pliler =

- Supreme Court of the United States

Decided June 11, 2007
- Full case name: Fry v. Pliler
- Citations: 551 U.S. 112 (more)

Holding
- In AEDPA proceedings, a federal court must assess the prejudicial impact of constitutional error in a state-court criminal trial under the "substantial and injurious effect" standard from Brecht v. Abrahamson, whether or not the state appellate court recognized the error and reviewed it for harmlessness.

Court membership
- Chief Justice John Roberts Associate Justices John P. Stevens · Antonin Scalia; Anthony Kennedy · David Souter; Clarence Thomas · Ruth Bader Ginsburg; Stephen Breyer · Samuel Alito

Case opinions
- Majority: Scalia, joined by Roberts, Kennedy, Thomas, Alito; Stevens, Souter, Ginsburg (all but Part II–B); Breyer (all but footnote 1 and Part II–B)
- Concur/dissent: Stevens, joined by Souter, Ginsburg; Breyer (in part)
- Concur/dissent: Breyer

Laws applied
- Antiterrorism and Effective Death Penalty Act of 1996

Fry v. Pliler, 551 U.S. 112 (2007), was a United States Supreme Court case in which the court held that in AEDPA proceedings, a federal court must assess the prejudicial impact of constitutional error in a state-court criminal trial under the "substantial and injurious effect" standard from Brecht v. Abrahamson, whether or not the state appellate court recognized the error and reviewed it for harmlessness.

== Background ==
John Francis Fry was charged with two counts of first-degree murder in connection to the October 27, 1992 murders of James and Cynthia Bell. The trial judge presiding over Fry's third criminal trial excluded the testimony of defense-witness Pamela Marie Maples. Maples was the cousin of Anthony Hurtz, who Fry asserted had confessed to committing the murders. Fry was convicted.

Fry argued on appeal that the exclusion of Maples' testimony violated Chambers v. Mississippi, which held that a combination of erroneous evidentiary rulings rose to the level of a due-process violation. The California Court of Appeal did not explicitly address that argument in affirming, but it stated, without specifying which harmless-error standard it was applying, that "no possible prejudice" could have resulted in light of the cumulative nature of Maples' testimony. The California Supreme Court denied discretionary review.

Fry then filed a federal habeas corpus petition in the United States District Court for the Eastern District of California, raising the due-process issue and other claims. The Magistrate Judge found that the state appellate court's failure to recognize Chambers error was an unreasonable application of clearly established law as set forth by the Supreme Court. Further, it disagreed with the state court's finding of "no possible prejudice". However, it concluded there was an insufficient showing that the improper exclusion of Maples' testimony had a "substantial and injurious effect" on the jury's verdict under Brecht v. Abrahamson. Agreeing, the district court denied relief.

When the case reached the Ninth Circuit Court of Appeals, Fry argued that the district court should not have used the Brecht test because the California Court of Appeals never conducted a prejudice review. The Ninth Circuit agreed with Fry that Maple's testimony was "material and would have substantially bolstered [Fry's] claims of innocence because she was sufficiently reliable and overheard Hurtz's confession of a double homicide." Nonetheless, the Ninth Circuit Court of Appeals affirmed because it agreed with the district court's application of Brecht.

== Opinion of the court ==
The Supreme Court issued an opinion on June 11, 2007.
