= United States v. Cronic =

- Supreme Court of the United States

Argued January 10, 1984 Decided May 14, 1984
- Full case name: United States, Petitioner v. Harrison P. Cronic
- Citations: 466 U.S. 648 (more) 104 S. Ct. 2039, 80 L. Ed. 2d 657
- Argument: Oral argument

Case history
- Prior: 675 F.2d 1126 (CA10 1982)

Holding
- A finding of prejudice in ineffective assistance of counsel claims cannot be based entirely on an inference.

Court membership
- Chief Justice Warren E. Burger Associate Justices William J. Brennan Jr. · Byron White; Thurgood Marshall · Harry Blackmun; Lewis F. Powell Jr. · William Rehnquist; John P. Stevens · Sandra Day O'Connor

Case opinions
- Majority: Stevens, joined by Burger, Brennan, White, Blackmun, Powell, Rehnquist, O'Connor
- Concurrence: Marshall (in judgment)

Laws applied
- Strickland v. Washington

United States v. Cronic, 466 U.S. 648 (1984), was a United States Supreme Court case in which the court held that a finding of prejudice in ineffective assistance of counsel claims cannot be based entirely on an inference. The defendant must satisfy the test from Strickland v. Washington by showing actual errors their attorney made and demonstrate that those errors affected the outcome of their trial.

== Background ==
Cronic had been charged with check kiting. After his attorney withdrew from the case, the court appointed him an inexperienced attorney who worked in real estate law and had never previously worked on a jury trial.

== Supreme Court ==
In an opinion by Justice John Paul Stevens, the Court reversed a decision by the United States Court of Appeals for the Tenth Circuit, which had reversed the conviction of Harrison P. Cronic on mail fraud charges. The Tenth Circuit had concluded that Cronic had received ineffective assistance of counsel in violation of the Sixth Amendment to the United States Constitution based on an "inferential" approach that did not inquire into whether Cronic's attorney had performed deficiently at trial. The Supreme Court acknowledged that the criteria on which the Tenth Circuit based this decision were "relevant to an evaluation of a lawyer's effectiveness in a particular case", but nevertheless held that they "neither separately nor in combination...provide a basis for concluding that competent counsel was not able to provide this respondent with the guiding hand that the Constitution guarantees." The Court further explained that only in the event of a "breakdown of the adversarial process", such as the absolute or constructive denial of counsel, can a court reasonably presume that the "prejudice" prong of the Strickland test is satisfied, and thus grant relief on an ineffective assistance of counsel claim.
