= Antiterrorism and Effective Death Penalty Act of 1996 =

United States law

- Long title: An Act to deter terrorism, provide justice for victims, provide for an effective death penalty, and for other purposes.
- Acronyms (colloquial): AEDPA
- Enacted by: the 104th United States Congress
- Effective: April 24, 1996

Citations
- Public law: Pub. L. 104–132 (text) (PDF)
- Statutes at Large: 110 Stat. 1214

Codification
- Acts amended: Immigration and Nationality Technical Corrections Act of 1994

Legislative history
- Introduced in the Senate as S. 735 "Comprehensive Terrorism Prevention Act of 1995" by Bob Dole (R-KS) on April 27, 1995; Passed the Senate on June 7, 1995 (91–8); Passed the House on March 14, 1996 (without objection); Reported by the joint conference committee on April 15, 1996; agreed to by the Senate on April 17, 1996 (91–8) and by the House on April 18, 1996 (293–133); Signed into law by President Bill Clinton on April 24, 1996

Major amendments
- Justice Against Sponsors of Terrorism Act

United States Supreme Court cases
- List: Felker v. Turpin, 518 U.S. 651 (1996); Lindh v. Murphy, 521 U.S. 320 (1997); Breard v. Greene, 523 U.S. 371 (1998); Calderon v. Thompson, 523 U.S. 538 (1998); Stewart v. Martinez-Villareal, 523 U.S. 637 (1998); Calderon v. Ashmus, 523 U.S. 740 (1998); Hohn v. United States, 524 U.S. 236 (1998); Immigration and Naturalization Service v. St. Cyr, 533 U.S. 289 (2001); Rice v. Collins, 546 U.S. 333 (2006); Fry v. Pliler, 551 U.S. 112 (2007); Jimenez v. Quarterman, 555 U.S. 113 (2009); Gonzalez v. Thaler, 565 U.S. 134 (2012); Davis v. Ayala, 576 U.S. 257 (2015); Banister v. Davis, No. 18-6943, 590 U.S. ___ (2020); United States v. Palomar-Santiago, No. 20-437, 593 U.S. ___ (2021); Brown v. Davenport, No. 20-826, 596 U.S. ___ (2022); Shinn v. Ramirez, No. 20-1009, 596 U.S. ___ (2022); Shoop v. Twyford, No. 21-511, 596 U.S. ___ (2022); Jones v. Hendrix, No. 21-857, 599 U.S. ___ (2023)

The Antiterrorism and Effective Death Penalty Act of 1996 (AEDPA), Pub. L. 104–132 (text) (PDF), 110 Stat. 1214, enacted April 24, 1996, was introduced to the United States Congress in April 1995 as a Senate Bill (S. 735). The bill was passed with broad bipartisan support by Congress in response to the 1995 Oklahoma City bombing. It was signed into law by President Bill Clinton.

Controversial for its changes to the law of habeas corpus in the United States, the AEDPA also contained a number of provisions to "deter terrorism, provide justice for victims, provide for an effective death penalty, and for other purposes."

== Background ==
On February 10, 1995, Senator Joe Biden introduced the Omnibus Counterterrorism Act of 1995 to the United States Senate. Just as with its successor, the omnibus bill was introduced on behalf of the Clinton Administration. In the two months that the bill was debated in the Senate, little progress was made towards passage.

Following the Oklahoma City bombing on April 19, 1995, a new antiterrorism bill was introduced to the Senate by Republican Senate Majority leader Bob Dole. The Antiterrorism and Effective Death Penalty Act of 1996 was introduced on April 27, 1995. Although the bill was promoted as an urgent measure, it remained stalled in Congress between December 1995 until March of 1996. It would not see further Congressional activity until March of 1996.

The act was codified in sections of Title 8, Title 18 and Title 28. The law amended the Foreign Sovereign Immunities Act to allow US citizens to file civil lawsuits against some foreign countries when Americans were killed in terrorist attacks. It authorized the State Department to designate foreign terrorist organizations.

Within days of the AEDPA being introduced, there were disagreements between Republican and Democratic leadership over combining federal habeas corpus reform with the anti-terrorism law. Republicans refused to negotiate with Congressional democrats and fast-tracked the bill without a report. Legal analysts note that the exaggerated urgency following the Oklahoma City bombing has tended to obscure the legislative history. Some of the changes to restrict de novo hearings in federal courts have been controversial.

In 1998 Antonin Scalia commented that the purpose of AEDPA was "to streamline and simplify [habeas corpus]". President Clinton acknowledged that "it should not take eight or nine years and three trips to the Supreme Court to finalize whether a person, in fact, was properly convicted or not". However, in his signing statement, he noted his strong objections to changes made to immigration statutes that eliminated relief for legal residents with minor drug convictions: "[AEDPA] makes a number of major ill-advised changes in our immigration laws having nothing to do with fighting terrorism." He did not want the anti-terrorism bill to stall over divisive additions. Instead of vetoing the bill, his administration pursued legislative options to countermand these changes.

AEDPA eventually passed with bipartisan support. The final vote in Senate was 91–8 and in the House of Representatives 293–133. It was signed into law on April 24, 1996.

== Provisions ==
=== Title I - Habeas Corpus Reform ===
Changes filing deadlines and limits appeals for death penalty cases. For more see Habeas Corpus.

=== Title II - Justice for Victims ===
This section provides for mandatory victim restitution, alters jurisdiction for lawsuits against terrorist states, and expands assistance for victims of terrorism.

=== Title III - International Terrorism Prohibitions ===
One of the sections included in the bill as originally introduced, this section received broad bipartisan support from the beginning. It prohibits international terrorist fundraising, gives authority to the Secretary of State to designate foreign organizations as terrorist organizations, allows criminal prosecution of anyone found to be providing funding to any organization linked to a designated terrorist organization. Prohibits assistance to terrorist states, including military aid and assistance from international financial institutions.

=== Title IV - Terrorist and Criminal Alien Removal and Exclusion ===
Provides for the removal of alien terrorists, the exclusion of members and representatives of terrorist organizations, modifies asylum procedures to allow denial of asylum to members of terrorist organizations, and alters criminal procedures for aliens.

In altering the criminal procedures for aliens, the law created a new system of secret evidence which allows the government to introduce classified information as evidence without disclosing the specifics of the evidence to the alien or their legal counsel. It also expands the criteria for deportation for crimes of moral turpitude.

=== Title V - Nuclear, Biological, and Chemical Weapons Restrictions ===
Defines and expands restrictions on certain types of nuclear materials, biological weapons, and chemical weapons.

=== Title VI - Implementation of Plastic Explosives Convention ===
Codifies the Convention on the Marking of Plastic Explosives requirement that all plastic explosives be equipped with detection agents and creates criminal sanctions for failure to comply.

=== Title VII - Criminal Law Modifications to Counter Terrorism ===
Changes to criminal law involving terrorist (or explosives) offenses, including increased penalties and criminal procedure changes. Commissioning a study to determine the constitutionality of restrictions on bomb-making materials.

=== Title VIII - Assistance to Law Enforcement ===
Provides additional resources and training for law enforcement including overseas training activities, additional requirements to preserve record evidence, and a commissioned study and report of electronic surveillance. Directed resources towards combatting international counterfeiting of U.S. currency, compiling statistics relating to the intimidation of government employees, and assessing and reducing the threat to law enforcement officers from the criminal use of firearms and ammunition. Also created the Commission on the Advancement of Federal Law Enforcement (Subtitle A).

Increased funding authorizations for law enforcement including the Federal Bureau of Investigation, Department of Justice, Immigration and Naturalization Service, and more.

=== Title IX - Miscellaneous ===
Expanded the territorial sea, changed proof of citizenship requirements, and limited legal representation fees and expenses in capital cases.

== Habeas corpus ==
AEDPA had a significant impact on the law of habeas corpus. Section 104(d) limits the power of federal courts to grant habeas corpus relief to state prisoners unless the state court's adjudication of the claim resulted in a decision that was

1. contrary to, or involved an unreasonable application of clearly established federal law as determined by the US Supreme Court; or
2. based on an unreasonable determination of the facts in light of the evidence presented in the state court proceeding.

In addition to the modifications that pertain to all habeas corpus cases, AEDPA enacted special review provisions for capital cases from states that enacted quality controls for the performance of counsel in the state courts in the post-conviction phase. States that enacted the quality controls would see strict time limitations enforced against their death-row inmates in federal habeas proceedings coupled with extremely deferential review to the determinations of their courts regarding issues of federal law. Arizona became the first state to successfully opt-in to this provision in 2020.

Other provisions of AEDPA created entirely new statutory law. For example, the judicially-created abuse-of-the-writ doctrine, established in McCleskey v. Zant (1991), had restricted the presentation of new claims through subsequent habeas petitions. AEDPA replaced this doctrine with a stricter bar on "second or successive petitions" (sec. 106).

Petitioners in federal habeas proceedings that have already been decided in a previous habeas petition would find the claims barred. Additionally, petitioners who had already filed a federal habeas petition were required to first secure authorization from the appropriate federal court of appeals. Furthermore, AEDPA took away from the Supreme Court the power to review a court of appeals's denial of that permission, thus placing final authority for the filing of second petitions in the hands of the federal courts of appeals.

The unanimous 8–0 Supreme Court decision Harrington v. Richter held that petitioners attempting to overcome the §2254(d) bar to federal review must show that the decision to deny habeas is unreasonable even when the state court provides only a summary ruling. Cullen v. Pinholster held that federal courts reviewing Strickland claims under AEDPA were limited to deciding whether the state decision was reasonable based on the record.

== Court cases ==
Soon after it was enacted, AEDPA endured a critical test in the Supreme Court. The basis of the challenge was that the provisions limiting the ability of persons to file successive habeas petitions violated Article I, Section 9, Clause 2, of the United States Constitution, the Suspension Clause. The Supreme Court held unanimously, in Felker v. Turpin, 518 U.S. 651 (1997), that the limitations did not unconstitutionally suspend the writ.

In 2005, the Ninth Circuit indicated that it was willing to consider a challenge to the constitutionality of AEDPA on separation of powers grounds under City of Boerne v. Flores and Marbury v. Madison, but it has since decided that the issue had been settled by circuit precedent.

Basketball player and later coach Steve Kerr and his siblings and mother sued the Iranian government under the Act for the 1984 killing of Kerr's father, Malcolm H. Kerr, in Beirut, Lebanon.

On June 21, 2022, the Supreme Court reinforced in Shoop v. Twyford that the power of federal courts to grant habeas corpus is restricted by AEDPA.

On June 12, 2025, the Supreme Court ruled in Rivers v. Guerrero: "Once a district court enters its judgment with respect to a first-filed habeas petition, a second-in-time filing qualifies as a 'second or successive application' properly subject to the requirements of [28 U.S.C.] §2244(b)."

== Reception ==
While the act has several titles and provisions, the majority of criticism stems from the act's tightening of habeas corpus laws. Those in favor of the bill say that the act prevents those convicted of crimes from being able to "thwart justice and avoid just punishment by filing frivolous appeals for years on end", while critics argue that the inability to make multiple appeals increases the risk of an innocent person being killed.

Title IV also received criticism following the enactment of the AEDPA. The section allowing a single Immigration and Naturalization officer to decide whether to offer asylum to an individual who claims persecution but does not have identification was specifically targeted. The provision extending the ability of officers to deport anyone who illegally entered the country at any point in time without a hearing before a judge was also criticized.

Other, more recent criticism centers on the deference that the law requires of federal judges in considering habeas petitions. In Sessoms v. Grounds (Ninth Circuit), the majority of the judges believed that the state erred in not throwing out testimony made in the absence of the defendant's attorney after he had requested counsel, but they were required to overturn his appeal. The dissenting opinion said that federal courts can only grant habeas relief if "there is no possibility fair-minded jurists could disagree that the state court's decision conflicts with [the Supreme] Court's precedents".

Lara Bazelon argues this lack of power for judicial relief (from the AEDPA and its judicial affirmations) has sometimes led to federal appellate judges to instead publicly shame state prosecutors during oral arguments, which are streamed online.

On Last Week Tonight with John Oliver on March 6, 2022, John Oliver called for the abolition of AEDPA because of the increased difficulty in appealing convictions and noting cases of wrongful convictions. He cited in particular Melissa Lucio, who first won her federal habeas corpus appeal for a new trial, but the appeal itself was then reversed by the same court citing the AEDPA.

== See also ==
- Illegal Immigration Reform and Immigrant Responsibility Act of 1996
- Immigration Act of 1990
- Anti-Drug Abuse Act of 1988
