= Palmore v. Sidoti =

- Supreme Court of the United States

Argued February 22, 1984 Decided April 24, 1984
- Full case name: Linda Sidoti Palmore v. Anthony J. Sidoti
- Citations: 466 U.S. 429 (more) 104 S. Ct. 1879
- Argument: Oral argument

Case history
- Prior: 426 So.2d 34
- Subsequent: 472 So.2d 843

Holding
- Social bias against interracial families is not a permissible consideration in determining child custody.

Court membership
- Chief Justice Warren E. Burger Associate Justices William J. Brennan Jr. · Byron White; Thurgood Marshall · Harry Blackmun; Lewis F. Powell Jr. · William Rehnquist; John P. Stevens · Sandra Day O'Connor

Case opinion
- Majority: Burger, joined by unanimous

Laws applied
- U.S. Const. amend. XIV

Palmore v. Sidoti, 466 U.S. 429 (1984) was a case heard by the Supreme Court of the United States. The decision rejected the consideration of racial bias in child custody proceedings as unconstitutional under the 14th Amendment. Today, the case is taught in many constitutional law courses in the United States as an example of the application of the doctrine of strict scrutiny.

== Background ==
Linda Palmore and Anthony Sidoti (both white) divorced in 1980 in Florida. Palmore was awarded custody of their daughter, Melanie. Some months later, Palmore began living with and eventually married Clarence Palmore Jr., a black man. In September 1981, Sidoti filed to modify the original custody award, citing "changed conditions." In particular, Sidoti argued that Palmore had failed to properly care for Melanie and that Palmore's cohabitation with Palmore constituted a "changed condition."

At the custody hearing, the Court found that there had been no change with respect to "either party's devotion to the child, adequacy of housing facilities, or respectability of the new spouse of either parent." Even so, the Court awarded custody to Sidoti because Melanie would suffer peer pressure and stigmatization if allowed to grow up in an interracial household.

== Decision ==
Chief Justice Warren E. Burger wrote for a unanimous Court. The Court acknowledged the existence of racial prejudice in American society, but reasoned that "[t]he Constitution cannot control such prejudices, but neither can it tolerate them. Private biases may be outside the reach of the law, but the law cannot, directly or indirectly, give them effect."

== Aftermath and legacy ==
Despite the favorable ruling, Palmore never regained custody of her daughter.

The Palmore decision has been cited as prohibiting judges from considering parents' sexual orientation in custody proceedings.

== See also ==
- List of United States Supreme Court cases, volume 466
- Personnel Administrator of Massachusetts v. Feeney
- United States v. Carolene Products Co.
- Equal Protection Clause
