= Beck v. PACE International Union =

- Supreme Court of the United States

Decided June 11, 2007
- Full case name: Beck v. PACE International Union
- Citations: 551 U.S. 96 (more)

Holding
- An employer that sponsors and administers a single-employer defined-benefit pension plan does not have a fiduciary obligation under ERISA to consider a merger with a multi-employer plan as a method of terminating the plan.

Court membership
- Chief Justice John Roberts Associate Justices John P. Stevens · Antonin Scalia; Anthony Kennedy · David Souter; Clarence Thomas · Ruth Bader Ginsburg; Stephen Breyer · Samuel Alito

Case opinion
- Majority: Scalia, joined by unanimous

Laws applied
- Employee Retirement Income Security Act of 1974

Beck v. PACE International Union, 551 U.S. 96 (2007), was a United States Supreme Court case in which the court held that an employer that sponsors and administers a single-employer defined-benefit pension plan does not have a fiduciary obligation under ERISA to consider a merger with a multi-employer plan as a method of terminating the plan.

== Background ==
PACE International Union represented employees covered by single-employer defined-benefit pension plans sponsored and administered by Crown, which had filed for bankruptcy. Crown rejected the labor union's proposal to terminate the plans by merging them with the union's own multiemployer plan, opting instead for a standard termination through the purchase of annuities, which would allow Crown to retain a $5 million reversion after satisfying its obligations to plan participants and beneficiaries. The union and respondent plan participants (collectively, PACE) filed an adversary action in the Bankruptcy Court, alleging that Crown's directors had breached their fiduciary duties under the Employee Retirement Income Security Act of 1974 (ERISA), by neglecting to give diligent consideration to PACE's merger proposal. The court ruled for PACE, and the bankruptcy trustee (Beck) appealed to the federal District Court, which affirmed in relevant part. The Ninth Circuit Court of Appeals affirmed as well. The Ninth Circuit acknowledged that the decision to terminate a pension plan is a business decision not subject to ERISA's fiduciary obligations but reasoned that the implementation of a termination decision is fiduciary in nature. It then determined that merger was a permissible termination method and that Crown therefore had a fiduciary obligation to consider PACE's merger proposal seriously, which it had failed to do.

== Opinion of the court ==
The Supreme Court issued an opinion on June 11, 2007.
