= Tennessee Secondary School Athletic Ass'n v. Brentwood Academy =

- Supreme Court of the United States

Decided June 21, 2007
- Full case name: Tennessee Secondary School Athletic Ass'n v. Brentwood Academy
- Citations: 551 U.S. 291 (more)

Holding
- A rule promulgated by a statewide association engaged in state action that prohibits high-school football coaches from contacting middle-school prospects does not violate the First Amendment, and the tactics used to recruit football players rise to the level of a governmental interest.

Court membership
- Chief Justice John Roberts Associate Justices John P. Stevens · Antonin Scalia; Anthony Kennedy · David Souter; Clarence Thomas · Ruth Bader Ginsburg; Stephen Breyer · Samuel Alito

Tennessee Secondary School Athletic Ass'n v. Brentwood Academy (also called Brentwood II), 551 U.S. 291 (2007), was a United States Supreme Court case in which the court held that a rule promulgated by a statewide association engaged in state action that prohibits high-school football coaches from contacting middle-school prospects does not violate the First Amendment, and the tactics used to recruit football players rise to the level of a governmental interest.

== Background ==
The Tennessee Secondary School Athletic Association (TSSAA) regulates interscholastic sports among its members, Tennessee public and private high schools. TSSAA sanctioned Brentwood Academy, one of those private schools, because its football coach sent eighth-grade boys a letter that violated TSSAA's rule prohibiting members from using "undue influence" in recruiting middle school students for their athletic programs. Following internal TSSAA review, Brentwood sued TSSAA and its executive director under Section 1983, claiming, among other things, that enforcement of the anti-recruiting rule was state action violative of the First and Fourteenth Amendments and that TSSAA's flawed adjudication of its appeal deprived Brentwood of due process. The federal District Court granted Brentwood relief, but the Sixth Circuit Court of Appeals reversed, holding that TSSAA was a private voluntary association that did not act under color of state law. The Supreme Court reversed that determination in Brentwood Academy v. Tennessee Secondary School Athletic Ass'n (2001), and the District Court again ruled for Brentwood on remand. The Sixth Circuit affirmed, holding that the anti-recruiting rule is a content-based regulation of speech that is not narrowly tailored to serve its permissible purposes and that the TSSAA board improperly considered ex parte evidence, thereby violating Brentwood's due process rights. The Supreme Court granted review.

== Opinion of the court ==
The Supreme Court issued an opinion on June 21, 2007. The court reversed in favor of the association. In a unanimous decision, Justice John Paul Stevens held that the anti-recruitment rule did not violate the First Amendment and that the tactics used to recruit football players rose to the level of a governmental interest. This was the first time that this sort of "undue influence" rule was applied by the Supreme Court outside the context of attorneys, as in Ohralik v. Ohio State Bar Ass'n.

On other claims, the case was sent back again to the Sixth Circuit.

== Later developments ==
The Sixth Circuit rejected the remaining claims and the Supreme Court denied review, ending the case.
