= Watson v. Philip Morris Cos. =

- Supreme Court of the United States

Decided June 11, 2007
- Full case name: Watson v. Philip Morris Cos.
- Citations: 551 U.S. 142 (more)

Holding
- The fact that a federal agency directs, supervises, and monitors a company's activities in considerable detail does not bring that company within the scope of the statute permitting removal jurisdiction for actions against federal officers.

Court membership
- Chief Justice John Roberts Associate Justices John P. Stevens · Antonin Scalia; Anthony Kennedy · David Souter; Clarence Thomas · Ruth Bader Ginsburg; Stephen Breyer · Samuel Alito

Case opinion
- Majority: Breyer, joined by unanimous

Laws applied
- 28 U.S.C. §1442(a)(1)

Watson v. Philip Morris Cos., 551 U.S. 142 (2007), was a United States Supreme Court case in which the court held that the fact that a federal agency directs, supervises, and monitors a company's activities in considerable detail does not bring that company within the scope of the statute permitting removal jurisdiction for actions against federal officers.

== Background ==
Plaintiffs including Watson filed a state-court suit claiming that Philip Morris violated Arkansas unfair business practice laws by advertising certain cigarette brands as "light" when, in fact, Philip Morris had manipulated testing results to register lower levels of tar and nicotine in the advertised cigarettes than would be delivered to consumers. Philip Morris removed the case to federal District Court under the federal-officer removal statute, which permits removal of an action against "any officer (or any person acting under that officer) of the United States or of any agency thereof". This is codified at 28 U.S.C. §1442(a)(1). The federal court upheld the removal, ruling that the complaint attacked Philip Morris' use of the Government's method of testing cigarettes and thus that petitioners had sued Philip Morris for "acting under" the Federal Trade Commission. The Eighth Circuit Court of Appeals affirmed, emphasizing the FTC's detailed supervision of the cigarette testing process and likening the case to others in which lower courts permitted removal by heavily regulated Government contractors.

== Opinion of the court ==
The Supreme Court issued an opinion on June 11, 2007.
