= List of United States Supreme Court cases, volume 551 =

This is a list of all the United States Supreme Court cases from volume 551 of the United States Reports:

Case name	Citation	Date decided
Uttecht v. Brown	551 U.S. 1	2007
Appeals courts must defer to a trial judge's decision on whether a potential juror would be able to overcome their personal objections to the death penalty and be open to voting to impose a death sentence.
Safeco Ins. Co. v. Burr	551 U.S. 47	2007
Where "willfulness" is a statutory condition of civil liability, it generally includes both knowing violations of a standard and reckless violations.
Sole v. Wyner	551 U.S. 74	2007
A party who achieves a preliminary injunction in a Section 1983 case is not a prevailing party for the purposes of attorneys fees if that preliminary injunction expires and is not converted into a permanent injunction.
Claiborne v. United States	551 U.S. 87	2007
Dismissed as moot following the death of the petitioner.
Erickson v. Pardus	551 U.S. 89	2007
Beck v. PACE Int'l Union	551 U.S. 96	2007
An employer that sponsors and administers a single-employer defined-benefit pension plan does not have a fiduciary obligation under ERISA to consider a merger with a multi-employer plan as a method of terminating the plan.
Fry v. Pliler	551 U.S. 112	2007
In AEDPA proceedings, a federal court must assess the prejudicial impact of constitutional error in a state-court criminal trial under the "substantial and injurious effect" standard from Brecht v. Abrahamson, whether or not the state appellate court recognized the error and reviewed it for harmlessness.
United States v. Atl. Research Corp.	551 U.S. 128	2007
Because CERCLA's Section 107(a)(4)(B) allows a potentially responsible party (PRP) to recover costs from other PRPs, the statute provides a private cause of action to achieve that result with a lawsuit.
Watson v. Philip Morris Cos.	551 U.S. 142	2007
The fact that a federal agency directs, supervises, and monitors a company's activities in considerable detail does not bring that company within the scope of the statute permitting removal jurisdiction for actions against federal officers.
Long Island Care at Home, Ltd. v. Coke	551 U.S. 158	2007
Davenport v. Wash. Ed. Ass'n	551 U.S. 177	2007
It does not violate the First Amendment for a State to require that its public-sector unions receive affirmative authorization from a nonmember before spending that nonmember's agency fees for election-related purposes.
Permanent Mission of India v. City of New York	551 U.S. 193	2007
The Foreign Sovereign Immunities Act does not preclude federal courts from hearing suits brought to enforce tax liens.
Bowles v. Russell	551 U.S. 205	2007
Federal Courts of Appeals lack jurisdiction to hear habeas appeals that are filed late, even if the district court said the petitioner had additional time to file.
Powerex Corp. v. Reliant Energy Services Inc.	551 U.S. 224	2007
Section 1447(d) bars appellate consideration of petitioner's claim that it is a foreign state for Foreign Sovereign Immunities Act of 1976 purposes.
Brendlin v. California	551 U.S. 249	2007
Automobile passengers are "seized" within the meaning of the Fourth Amendment when the car in which they are riding is held at a law enforcement traffic stop.
Credit Suisse Securities (USA) LLC v. Billing	551 U.S. 264	2007
Congress's creation of the Securities and Exchange Commission implicitly exempted regulated securities industries from antitrust lawsuits.
Tenn. Secondary School Athletic Ass'n v. Brentwood Academy	551 U.S. 291	2007
A rule promulgated by a statewide association engaged in state action that prohibits high-school football coaches from contacting middle-school prospects does not violate the First Amendment, and the tactics used to recruit football players rise to the level of a governmental interest.
Tellabs Inc. v. Makor Issues & Rights Ltd.	551 U.S. 308	2007
To qualify as "strong" within the intended meaning of § 21D(b)(2), an inference of scienter must be more than merely plausible or reasonable-it must be cogent and at least as compelling as any opposing inference of nonfraudulent intent.
Rita v. United States	551 U.S. 338	2007
Federal appellate courts may apply a presumption of reasonableness to sentences imposed under the Federal Sentencing Guidelines.
Morse v. Frederick	551 U.S. 393	2007
Because schools may take steps to safeguard those entrusted to their care from speech that can be regarded as encouraging illegal drug use, the school officials in this case did not violate the First Amendment by confiscating the pro-drug banner and suspending Frederick.
Wilkie v. Robbins	551 U.S. 537	2007
A government agency taking "too much" legitimate against a person does not create a Bivens claim, and that agency's retaliation against a person for resistance to agency action does not create a Bivens claim either.
FEC v. Wis. Right to Life, Inc.	551 U.S. 449	2007
Section 203 of the Bipartisan Campaign Reform Act of 2002 is constitutional to the extent that it deals with advertisements which expressly advocate for the victory or defeat of a political candidate in the months which immediately precede elections.
Hein v. Freedom from Religion Foundation	551 U.S. 587	2007
Taxpayers do not have the right to challenge the constitutionality of expenditures by the executive branch of the government.
Nat'l Assn. of Home Builders v. Defenders of Wildlife	551 U.S. 644	2007
Section 7 of the Endangered Species Act applies only to federal agency actions over which the agency has discretionary involvement or control.
Parents Involved in Community Schools v. Seattle Sch. Dist.	551 U.S. 701	2007
The student assignment plan of Seattle Public Schools and Jefferson County Public Schools does not meet the narrowly tailored and compelling interest requirements for a race-based assignment plan because it is used only to achieve "racial balance." Public schools may not use race as the sole determining factor for assigning students to schools. Race-conscious objectives to achieve diverse school environment may be acceptable.
Leegin Creative Leather Products Inc. v. PSKS Inc.	551 U.S. 877	2007
Vertical price restraints are to be judged by the rule of reason rather than treated as illegal per se.
Panetti v. Quarterman	551 U.S. 930	2007
Criminal defendants sentenced to death may not be executed if they do not understand the reason for their imminent execution, and that once the state has set an execution date death-row inmates may litigate their competency to be executed in habeas corpus proceedings.
Dada v. Mukasey	551 U.S. 1188	2007
A non-citizen must be permitted an opportunity to withdraw a motion for voluntary departure, provided the request is made before expiration of the departure period.
