= Harrington v. Richter =

- Supreme Court of the United States

Decided January 19, 2011
- Full case name: Harrington v. Richter
- Citations: 562 U.S. 86 (more)

Holding
- AEDPA's standard for federal habeas relief applies even when a state court does not issue an opinion explaining the basis of its decision.

Court membership
- Chief Justice John Roberts Associate Justices Antonin Scalia · Anthony Kennedy; Clarence Thomas · Ruth Bader Ginsburg; Stephen Breyer · Samuel Alito; Sonia Sotomayor · Elena Kagan

Case opinions
- Majority: Kennedy, joined by Roberts, Scalia, Thomas, Breyer, Alito, Sotomayor
- Concurrence: Ginsburg
- Kagan took no part in the consideration or decision of the case.

Laws applied
- Antiterrorism and Effective Death Penalty Act of 1996

Harrington v. Richter, 562 U.S. 86 (2011), was a United States Supreme Court case in which the court held that the Antiterrorism and Effective Death Penalty Act of 1996's standard for federal habeas relief applies even when a state court does not issue an opinion explaining the basis of its decision. The case also dealt with assistance of counsel issues under Strickland v. Washington.
