= Welsh v. Wisconsin =

- Supreme Court of the United States

Argued October 5, 1983 Decided May 15, 1984
- Full case name: Edward G. Welsh v. State of Wisconsin
- Docket no.: 82-5466
- Citations: 466 U.S. 740 (more) 104 S. Ct. 2091; 80 L. Ed. 2d 732; 1984 U.S. LEXIS 82; 52 U.S.L.W. 4581
- Argument: Oral argument

Case history
- Procedural: Certiorari to the Supreme Court of Wisconsin

Holding
- Absent exigent circumstances, a warrantless nighttime entry into the home of an individual to arrest him for a civil, nonjailable traffic offense is prohibited by the special protection afforded the individual in his home by the Fourth Amendment.

Court membership
- Chief Justice Warren E. Burger Associate Justices William J. Brennan Jr. · Byron White; Thurgood Marshall · Harry Blackmun; Lewis F. Powell Jr. · William Rehnquist; John P. Stevens · Sandra Day O'Connor

Case opinions
- Majority: Brennan, joined by Marshall, Blackmun, Powell, Stevens, O'Connor
- Concurrence: Blackmun
- Dissent: White, joined by Rehnquist, (Burger would have dismissed the writ)

Laws applied
- Fourth Amendment

Welsh v. Wisconsin, 466 U.S. 740 (1984), was a 1983 case before the US Supreme Court determining that a warrantless home arrest without exigent circumstances violates the Fourth Amendment protection against unlawful search and seizure.

== Facts ==
On the evening of April 24, 1978, Randy Jablonic witnessed a vehicle moving erratically, and then saw it swerve off the road and come to a stop in an open field. No damage to any people or property was reported or witnessed. Jablonic parked his truck behind the car to prevent the driver from returning to the highway. A woman stopped near the scene and Jablonic asked her to call the police. Before the police arrived, the driver exited his car and asked Jablonic for a ride. Jablonic suggested to him that they wait for police and roadside assistance, but the driver ignored his request and walked away. When the police arrived, Jablonic told the officer that the driver either looked "very inebriated or very sick". The officer then identified the driver as Edward G. Welsh from the registration of the abandoned car. The same officer noticed that Welsh's house was within walking distance of the scene. Without securing an arrest or search warrant, the police went to Welsh's house at about 9:00 pm and knocked on the door. Welsh's stepdaughter answered the door, but it is unclear whether she consented to the officers' entry (the court assumed that consent was not given). The officers found Welsh upstairs in his bed, naked. The police then arrested him for driving while under the influence of an intoxicant. As he was taken to the police station, he refused to take a breathalyzer test. Under the relevant Wisconsin DUI statute, a first offense was a noncriminal violation subject to a civil forfeiture proceeding for a maximum fine of $300.

=== Trial and Appeals ===
Welsh had two separate trials. One proceeding was for him refusing the breathalyzer test, since under Wisconsin law, a hearing had to be provided in order to determine whether the test was justified or not. The second proceeding was for the alleged offense itself. Before the refusal hearing was held, Welsh was charged with violating the Wisconsin DUI statute. Welsh filed a pre-trial motion, demanding that the charge against him be dismissed, arguing that his arrest was in itself, invalid, due to him not being in a vehicle at the time of arrest. The trial court denied the motion in July 1980. The refusal hearing was not held until September 1980, which also ruled against Welsh. His license was suspended for 60 days. The Wisconsin Court of Appeals vacated the order, on the grounds that although probable cause was established, the trial court did not effectively establish exigent circumstances. Therefore, Welsh's refusal was considered reasonable, and his suspension was overturned. The Wisconsin Supreme Court overturned the Court of Appeals, reasoning that,"

The foregoing evidence, when myopically parsed, may not individually support a finding of probable cause. When examined collectively, however, it unquestionably indicates "that quantum of evidence which would lead a reasonable police officer to believe that the defendant [driver] probably [violated the statute prohibiting driving while under the influence of an intoxicant]."[7]State v. Cheers, 102 Wis. 2d at 386; see Henry v. United States, supra; secs. 345.22 and 346.63(1), Stats. 1977. The evidence in this case clearly demonstrates that the trial court was correct in ruling that the state had met its burden.

In considering the governmental interest, it is appropriate to note that driving under the influence is a pervasive problem of substantial proportion. In Wisconsin in 1981, there was a 5 percent increase in drunken driving convictions from 1980.[8] Further, approximately 50 percent *335 of all drivers killed in Wisconsin were driving while legally intoxicated.[9] The increasing number of fatalities caused by drunken drivers has aroused state legislatures to adopt stricter penalties in the forms of substantial fines, imprisonment, and license suspensions to punish those who violate the laws prohibiting driving while under the influence of an intoxicant.[10]." "Frequently, proof that the officer is in hot pursuit of the suspect constitutes exigency. The hot pursuit doctrine evolved to encompass situations where time was of the essence. In other words, when requiring the police to obtain a warrant would constitute undue delay, the hot pursuit doctrine is applicable. In this case, time was of the essence. The inherent nature of the offense demanded the suspect's immediate apprehension to accommodate the dictates of the blood alcohol test statute. Section 343.305(2) (a), Stats. 1977. In order for the officer to enforce the statutory requisites, the situation demanded his immediate search for and pursuit of the suspect.

The defendant, fearful of the officer's impending arrival and perhaps recognizing the possibility of being requested to submit to a blood alcohol test, left the scene of the accident upon discovering that the officer had been summoned. Fleeing to his home, in an attempt to avoid a confrontation with the officer, the defendant's hasty departure resulted in the abandonment of his car. If the officer had retreated and sought to obtain a warrant, rather than immediately pursuing and arresting the suspect, the requirements of the blood alcohol statutes would have been frustrated.

The imminent threat to safety doctrine also constitutes exigent circumstances. The sole purpose of the blood alcohol *337 test is to facilitate prosecution of those driving while under the influence of an intoxicant. See sec. 343.305(2) (a) and 346.63(1), Stats. 1977. Further, sec. 345.24, Stats. 1977, provides that a person arrested for driving while under the influence of an intoxicant "may not be released until four hours have elapsed."[11] This severe treatment is dramatic evidence of the legislature's intent and recognition of the need to protect the public from drunken drivers. Undoubtedly, this provision was enacted to prevent drunken drivers from returning to the road while intoxicated. Presumably, this four-hour statutory limitation sought to provide an adequate time allowance for the arrested intoxicant's blood alcohol content to metabolize to a safer level, equal to or less than .05 percent. Restraining those drivers who pose a danger to themselves and the public for the four-hour statutory period constitutes a preventive measure, designed to promote public safety.

The officer concluded that he had probable cause to believe that the defendant had been operating a motor vehicle while under the influence of an intoxicant. Accordingly, the situation demanded the officer's prompt attempt to locate the defendant. An arrest would prevent the driver from returning to his, or another automobile, where he could have continued to drive in his current state, posing a danger to himself and the public. Consequently, the nature of this offense, coupled with the potential *338 threat to the public safety, satisfied the exigent circumstances test pursuant to the imminent threat to safety doctrine.

An equally persuasive argument is the probable destruction of evidence. This is a model case demonstrating the urgency involved in arresting the suspect in order to preserve evidence of the statutory violation. "Sometimes the nature of the evidence will be such that it will soon disappear of its own accord." 2 W. LaFave, Search and Seizure, sec. 6.5 at 448 (1978). "Blood rapidly metabolizes alcohol after a person ceases drinking; thus creating an exigent situation." State v. Bentley, 92 Wis. 2d 860, 864, 286 N.W.2d 153 (Ct. App. 1979). Without an immediate blood alcohol test, highly reliable and persuasive evidence facilitating the state's proof of the defendant's alleged violation of sec. 346.63(1), Stats. 1977, would be destroyed. See sec. 343.305(2) (a), Stats. 1977. Accordingly, the facts of this case adhere to the presumption favoring warrantless arrests which are a result "of an ongoing investigation in the field," rather than an arrest that had been planned. W. LaFave, supra, sec. 6.1 at 391.[12]."

== Holding ==
The Court decided 6-2 (Burger filed a separate statement against the writ) that Welsh's arrest and suspension of his license was a violation of the Fourth Amendment. Justice William Brennan authored the majority opinion, stating that,"

It is axiomatic that the "physical entry of the home is the chief evil against which the wording of the Fourth Amendment is directed." United States v. United States District Court, 407 U. S. 297, 407 U. S. 313 (1972). And a principal protection against unnecessary intrusions into private dwellings is the warrant requirement imposed by the Fourth Amendment on agents of the government who seek to enter the home for purposes of search or arrest. See Johnson v. United States, 333 U. S. 10, 333 U. S. 13-14 (1948). [Footnote 10] It is not surprising, therefore,

Page 466 U. S. 749

that the Court has recognized, as

"a 'basic principle of Fourth Amendment law[,]' that searches and seizures inside a home without a warrant are presumptively unreasonable."

Payton v. New York, 445 U.S. at 445 U. S. 586. See Coolidge v. New Hampshire, 403 U. S. 443, 403 U. S. 474-475 (1971) ("a search or seizure carried out on a suspect's premises without a warrant is per se unreasonable, unless the police can show . . . the presence of exigent circumstances'"). See also Michigan v. Clifford, 464 U. S. 287, 464 U. S. 296-297 (1984) (plurality opinion); Steagald v. United States, 451 U. S. 204, 451 U. S. 211-212 (1981); McDonald v. United States, 335 U. S. 451, 335 U. S. 456 (1948); Johnson v. United States, supra, at 333 U. S. 13–15; Boyd v. United States, 116 U. S. 616, 116 U. S. 630 (1886).

Consistently with these long-recognized principles, the Court decided in Payton v. New York, supra, that warrantless felony arrests in the home are prohibited by the Fourth Amendment, absent probable cause and exigent circumstances. Id. at 445 U. S. 583–590. At the same time, the Court declined to consider the scope of any exception for exigent circumstances that might justify warrantless home arrests, id. at 445 U. S. 583, thereby leaving to the lower courts the initial application of the exigent circumstances exception. [Footnote 11] Prior decisions of this Court, however, have emphasized that exceptions to the warrant requirement are "few in number and carefully delineated," United States v. United States District Court, supra, at 407 U. S. 318, and that the police bear a heavy burden

Page 466 U. S. 750

when attempting to demonstrate an urgent need that might justify warrantless searches or arrests. Indeed, the Court has recognized only a few such emergency conditions, see, e.g., United States v. Santana, 427 U. S. 38, 427 U. S. 42-43 (1976) (hot pursuit of a fleeing felon); Warden v. Hayden, 387 U. S. 294, 387 U. S. 298-299 (1967) (same); Schmerber v. California, 384 U. S. 757, 384 U. S. 770-771 (1966) (destruction of evidence); Michigan v. Tyler, 436 U. S. 499, 436 U. S. 509 (1978) (ongoing fire), and has actually applied only the "hot pursuit" doctrine to arrests in the home, see Santana, supra.

Our hesitation in finding exigent circumstances, especially when warrantless arrests in the home are at issue, is particularly appropriate when the underlying offense for which there is probable cause to arrest is relatively minor. Before agents of the government may invade the sanctity of the home, the burden is on the government to demonstrate exigent circumstances that overcome the presumption of unreasonableness that attaches to all warrantless home entries. See Payton v. New York, supra, at 445 U. S. 586. When the government's interest is only to arrest for a minor offense, [Footnote 12] that presumption of unreasonableness is difficult to rebut, and the government usually should be allowed to make such arrests only with a warrant issued upon probable cause by a neutral and detached magistrate.

This is not a novel idea. Writing in concurrence in McDonald v. United States, 335 U. S. 451 (1948), Justice Jackson explained why a finding of exigent circumstances to justify a warrantless home entry should be severely restricted when only a minor offense has been committed:

Page 466 U. S. 751

"Even if one were to conclude that urgent circumstances might justify a forced entry without a warrant, no such emergency was present in this case. This method of law enforcement displays a shocking lack of all sense of proportion. Whether there is reasonable necessity for a search without waiting to obtain a warrant certainly depends somewhat upon the gravity of the offense thought to be in progress as well as the hazards of the method of attempting to reach it. . . . It is to me a shocking proposition that private homes, even quarters in a tenement, may be indiscriminately invaded at the discretion of any suspicious police officer engaged in following up offenses that involve no violence or threats of it. While I should be human enough to apply the letter of the law with some indulgence to officers acting to deal with threats or crimes of violence which endanger life or security, it is notable that few of the searches found by this Court to be unlawful dealt with that category of crime. . . . While the enterprise of parting fools from their money by the 'numbers' lottery is one that ought to be suppressed, I do not think its suppression is more important to society than the security of the people against unreasonable searches and seizures. When an officer undertakes to act as his own magistrate, he ought to be in a position to justify it by pointing to some real immediate and serious consequences if he postponed action to get a warrant."

Id. at 335 U. S. 459-460 (footnote omitted).

Consistently with this approach, the lower courts have looked to the nature of the underlying offense as an important factor to be considered in the exigent circumstances calculus. In a leading federal case defining exigent circumstances, for example, the en banc United States Court of Appeals for the District of Columbia Circuit recognized that the gravity of the underlying offense was a principal factor

Page 466 U. S. 752

to be weighed. Dorman v. United States, 140 U.S.App.D.C. 313, 320, 435 F.2d 385, 392 (1970). [Footnote 13] Without approving all of the factors included in the standard adopted by that court, it is sufficient to note that many other lower courts have also considered the gravity of the offense an important part of their constitutional analysis.

For example, courts have permitted warrantless home arrests for major felonies if identifiable exigencies, independent of the gravity of the offense, existed at the time of the arrest. Compare United States v. Campbell, 581 F.2d 22 (CA2 1978) (allowing warrantless home arrest for armed robbery when exigent circumstances existed), with Commonwealth v. Williams, 483 Pa. 293, 396 A.2d 1177 (1978) (disallowing warrantless home arrest for murder due to absence of exigent circumstances). But of those courts addressing the issue, most have refused to permit warrantless home arrests for nonfelonious crimes. See, e.g., State v. Gertin, 190 Conn.440, 453, 461 A.2d 963, 970 (1983) ("The [exigent circumstances] exception is narrowly drawn to cover cases of real, and not contrived, emergencies. The exception is limited to the investigation of serious crimes; misdemeanors are excluded"); People v. Strelow, 96 Mich.App. 182, 190–193, 292 N.W.2d 517, 521-522 (1980). See also People v. Sanders, 59 Ill.App.3d 6, 374 N.E.2d 1315 (1978) (burglary without weapons not grave offense of violence for this purpose); State v. Bennett, 295 N.W.2d 5 (S.D.1980) (distribution of controlled substances not a grave offense for these purposes). But cf. State v. Penas, 200 Neb. 387, 263 N.W.2d 835 (1978) (allowing warrantless home arrest upon hot pursuit from commission of misdemeanor in the officer's presence; decided before Payton); State v. Niedermeyer, 48 Ore.App. 665, 617

Page 466 U. S. 753

P.2d 911 (1980) (allowing warrantless home arrest upon hot pursuit from commission of misdemeanor in the officer's presence). The approach taken in these cases should not be surprising. Indeed, without necessarily approving any of these particular holdings or considering every possible factual situation, we note that it is difficult to conceive of a warrantless home arrest that would not be unreasonable under the Fourth Amendment when the underlying offense is extremely minor.

We therefore conclude that the common-sense approach utilized by most lower courts is required by the Fourth Amendment prohibition on "unreasonable searches and seizures," and hold that an important factor to be considered when determining whether any exigency exists is the gravity of the underlying offense for which the arrest is being made. Moreover, although no exigency is created simply because there is probable cause to believe that a serious crime has been committed, see Payton, application of the exigent circumstances exception in the context of a home entry should rarely be sanctioned when there is probable cause to believe that only a minor offense, such as the kind at issue in this case, has been committed.

Application of this principle to the facts of the present case is relatively straightforward. The petitioner was arrested in the privacy of his own bedroom for a noncriminal, traffic offense. The State attempts to justify the arrest by relying on the hot-pursuit doctrine, on the threat to public safety, and on the need to preserve evidence of the petitioner's blood alcohol level. On the facts of this case, however, the claim of hot pursuit is unconvincing, because there was no immediate or continuous pursuit of the petitioner from the scene of a crime. Moreover, because the petitioner had already arrived home, and had abandoned his car at the scene of the accident, there was little remaining threat to the public safety. Hence, the only potential emergency claimed by the State was the need to ascertain the petitioner's blood alcohol level.

Page 466 U. S. 754

Even assuming, however, that the underlying facts would support a finding of this exigent circumstance, mere similarity to other cases involving the imminent destruction of evidence is not sufficient. The State of Wisconsin has chosen to classify the first offense for driving while intoxicated as a noncriminal, civil forfeiture offense for which no imprisonment is possible. See Wis.Stat. § 346.65(2) (1975); § 346.65(2)(a) (Supp.1983–1984); supra at 466 U. S. 746. This is the best indication of the State's interest in precipitating an arrest, and is one that can be easily identified both by the courts and by officers faced with a decision to arrest. See n 6, supra. Given this expression of the State's interest, a warrantless home arrest cannot be upheld simply because evidence of the petitioner's blood alcohol level might have dissipated while the police obtained a warrant. [Footnote 14] To allow a warrantless home entry on these facts would be to approve unreasonable police behavior that the principles of the Fourth Amendment will not sanction."

=== Analysis ===
1. When the government’s interest is only to arrest for a minor offense, that presumption of unreasonableness is difficult to rebut, and the government usually should be allowed to make such arrests only with a warrant issued upon probable cause by a neutral and detached magistrate.
2. An important factor to be considered when determining whether any exigency exists is the gravity of the underlying offense for which the arrest is being made. Exception to a home entry should rarely be sanctioned.
3. Evidence of petitioner’s blood-alcohol level may dissipate is not sufficient here since the minor offense is insufficiently substantial to justify warrantless in-home arrests under exigent circumstances (where dissent disagrees).

=== Blackmun's concurrence ===
Justice Harry Blackmun concurred, agreeing with the majority opinion, but argued that the Wisconsin statute should be changed, claiming that,"

I join the Court's opinion but add a personal observation.

I yield to no one in my profound personal concern about the unwillingness of our national consciousness to face up to—and to do something about—the continuing slaughter upon our Nation's highways, a good percentage of which is due to drivers who are drunk or semi-incapacitated because of alcohol or drug ingestion. I have spoken in these Reports to this point before. Perez v. Campbell, 402 U. S. 637, 402 U. S. 657, and 402 U. S. 672 (1971) (opinion concurring in part and dissenting in part); Tate v. Short, 401 U. S. 395, 401 U. S. 401 (1971) (concurring opinion). See also South Dakota v. Neville, 459 U. S. 553, 459 U. S. 555-559 (1983).

And it is amazing to me that one of our great States—one which, by its highway signs, proclaims to be diligent and emphatic in its prosecution of the drunken driver—still classifies driving while intoxicated as a civil violation that allows only a money forfeiture of not more than $300 so long as it is a first offense. Wis.Stat. § 346.65(2)(a) (Supp.1983–1984). The State, like the indulgent parent, hesitates to discipline the spoiled child very much, even though the child is engaging in an act that is dangerous to others who are law abiding and helpless in the face of the child's act. See ante at 466 U. S. 754, n. 14 (citing other statutes). Our personal convenience still weighs heavily in the balance, and the highway deaths and

Page 466 U. S. 756

injuries continue. But if Wisconsin and other States choose by legislation thus to regulate their penalty structure, there is, unfortunately, nothing in the United States Constitution that says they may not do so."

=== White's dissent ===
Justice Byron White filed a dissenting opinion, which was joined by Justice William Rehnquist, arguing that the State of Wisconsin's interest to combat drunk driving, along with Welsh's behavior, was in line with the Fourth Amendment, Welsh did not use the exclusionary rule when it came to the breathalyzer test, A test relying on exigent circumstances to weigh the gravity of the crime would hamper law enforcement, the Court ignores the benefits of the statute and solely relied on the penalties of the first offense, and that common law justified the arrest ,"

At common law,

"a peace officer was permitted to arrest without a warrant for a misdemeanor or felony committed in his presence as well as for a felony not committed in his presence if there was reasonable ground for making the arrest."

United States v. Watson, 423 U. S. 411, 423 U. S. 418 (1976). But the requirement that a misdemeanor must have occurred in the officer's presence to justify a warrantless arrest is not grounded in the Fourth Amendment, see Street v. Surdyka, 492 F.2d 368, 371-372 (CA4 1974); 2 W. LaFave, Search and Seizure § 5.1 (1978), and we have never held that a warrant is constitutionally required to arrest for nonfelony offenses occurring out of the officer's presence. Thus,

"it is generally recognized today that the common law authority to arrest without a warrant in misdemeanor cases may be enlarged by statute, and this has been done in many of the states."

E. Fisher, Laws of Arrest 130 (1967); see ALI, Model Code of Pre-Arraignment Procedure, Appendix X (1975); 1 C. Alexander, The Law of Arrest 445-447 (1949); Wilgus, Arrest Without a Warrant, 22 Mich.L.Rev. 541, 673, 706 (1924).

Wisconsin is one of the States that have expanded the common law authority to arrest for nonfelony offenses. Wisconsin Stat. § 345.22 (Supp.1983–1984) provides that

"[a] person may be arrested without a warrant for the violation of a traffic regulation if the traffic officer has reasonable grounds to believe that the person is violating or has violated a traffic regulation."

Relying on this statutory authority, officers of the Madison Police Department arrested Edward Welsh in a bedroom in his home for violating Wis.Stat. § 346.63(1) (1977), which proscribes the operation of a motor

Page 466 U. S. 757

vehicle while intoxicated. Welsh refused to submit to a breath or blood test, and his operator's license was eventually revoked for 60 days for this reason pursuant to Wis.Stat. § 343.305 (1975).

In the civil license revocation proceeding, Welsh argued that his arrest in his house without a warrant was unconstitutional under the Fourth and Fourteenth Amendments to the Federal Constitution, and that his refusal to submit to the test could not be used against him. This contention was not based on the proposition that using the refusal in the revocation proceeding would contravene federal law, but rather rested on the fact that Wis.Stat. § 343.305(2)(b)(5) (1975) had been interpreted to require that an arrest be legal if a refusal to be tested is to be the basis for a license revocation.

On review of the license revocation, the Supreme Court of Wisconsin appears to have recognized that, under the Wisconsin statute, Welsh's license was wrongfully revoked if the officers who arrested him had violated the Federal Constitution. 108 Wis.2d 319, 321 N.W.2d 245 (1982). See Scales v. State, 64 Wis.2d 485, 494, 219 N.W.2d 286, 292 (1974). The court acknowledged that "the individual's right to privacy in the home is a fundamental freedom," and made clear that the State bore the burden of establishing exigent circumstances justifying a warrantless in-home arrest. 108 Wis.2d at 327, 321 N.W.2d at 250. But it discerned a strong state interest in combating driving under the influence of alcohol, id. at 334–335, 321 N.W.2d at 253–254, and held that the warrantless arrest was proper because (1) the officers were in hot pursuit of a defendant seeking to avoid a chemical sobriety test; (2) Welsh posed a potential threat to public safety; and (3) "[w]ithout an immediate blood alcohol test, highly reliable and persuasive evidence facilitating the state's proof of [Welsh's] alleged violation . . . would be destroyed." Id. at 338, 321 N.W.2d at 255. For two reasons, I would not overturn the judgment of the Supreme Court of Wisconsin.

Page 466 U. S. 758

First, it is not at all clear to me that the important constitutional question decided today should be resolved in a case such as this. Although Welsh argues vigorously that the State violated his federal constitutional rights, he at no point relied on the exclusionary rule, and he does not contend that the Federal Constitution or federal law provides the remedy he seeks. As a general rule, this Court "reviews judgments, not statements in opinions." Black v. Cutter Laboratories, 351 U. S. 292, 351 U. S. 297 (1956). Because the Court does not purport tc hold that federal law requires the conclusion that Welsh's refusal to submit to a sobriety test was reasonable, it is not clear to me how the judgment of the Supreme Court of Wisconsin offends federal law.

It is true that, under the Wisconsin statutory scheme, an arrestee's refusal to take a breath or blood test would be reasonable, and would not justify revocation of operating privileges if the underlying arrest violated the Fourth Amendment or was otherwise unlawful. What the State has done, however, is to attach consequences to an arrest found unlawful under the Federal Constitution that we have never decided federal law itself would attach. The Court has occasionally taken jurisdiction over cases in which the States have provided remedies for violations of federally defined obligations. E.g., Moore v. Chesapeake & Ohio R. Co., 291 U. S. 205 (1934). But it has done so in contexts where state remedies are employed to further federal policies. See Greene, Hybrid State Law in the Federal Courts, 83 Harv.L.Rev. 289, 300 (1969). The Fourth Amendment of course applies to the police conduct at issue here. In providing that a driver may reasonably refuse to submit to a sobriety test if he was unlawfully arrested, Wisconsin's Legislature and courts are pursuing a course that they apparently hope will reduce police illegality and safeguard their citizens' rights. Although the State is entitled to draw this conclusion and to implement it as a matter of state law, I am very doubtful that the policies underlying the Fourth Amendment would

Page 466 U. S. 759

require exclusion of the fruits of an illegal arrest in a civil proceeding to remove from the highways a person who insists on driving while under the influence of alcohol. If that is the case—if it would violate no federal policy to revoke Welsh's license even if his arrest was illegal—there is no satisfactory reason for us to review the Supreme Court of Wisconsin's judgment affirming the revocation, even if that court mistakenly applied the Fourth Amendment. For me, this is ample reason not to disturb the judgment.

In any event, I believe that the state court properly construed the Fourth Amendment. It follows from Payton v. New York, 445 U. S. 573 (1980), that warrantless nonfelony arrests in the home are prohibited by the Fourth Amendment absent probable cause and exigent circumstances. Although I continue to believe that the Court erred in Payton in requiring exigent circumstances to justify warrantless in-home felony arrests, id. at 445 U. S. 603 (WHITE, J., dissenting), I do not reject the obvious logical implication of the Court's decision. But I see little to commend an approach that looks to "the nature of the underlying offense as an important factor to be considered in the exigent circumstances calculus." Ante at 466 U. S. 751.

The gravity of the underlying offense is, I concede, a factor to be considered in determining whether the delay that attends the warrant-issuance process will endanger officers or other persons. The seriousness of the offense with which a suspect may be charged also bears on the likelihood that he will flee and escape apprehension if not arrested immediately. But if, under all the circumstances of a particular case, an officer has probable cause to believe that the delay involved in procuring an arrest warrant will gravely endanger the officer or other persons or will result in the suspect's escape, I perceive no reason to disregard those exigencies on the ground that the offense for which the suspect is sought is a "minor" one.

Page 466 U. S. 760

As a practical matter, I suspect, the Court's holding is likely to have a greater impact in cases where the officer acted without a warrant to prevent the imminent destruction or removal of evidence. If the evidence the destruction or removal of which is threatened documents only the suspect's participation in a "minor" crime, the Court apparently would preclude a finding that exigent circumstances justified the warrantless arrest. I do not understand why this should be so.

A warrantless home entry to arrest is no more intrusive when the crime is "minor" than when the suspect is sought in connection with a serious felony. The variable factor, if there is one, is the governmental interest that will be served by the warrantless entry. Wisconsin's Legislature and its Supreme Court have both concluded that warrantless in-home arrests under circumstances like those present here promote valid and substantial state interests. In determining whether the challenged governmental conduct was reasonable, we are not bound by these determinations. But nothing in our previous decisions suggests that the fact that a State has defined an offense as a misdemeanor for a variety of social, cultural, and political reasons necessarily requires the conclusion that warrantless in-home arrests designed to prevent the imminent destruction or removal of evidence of that offense are always impermissible. If anything, the Court's prior decisions support the opposite conclusion. See Camara v. Municipal Court, 387 U. S. 523, 387 U. S. 539-540 (1967); McDonald v. United States, 335 U. S. 451, 335 U. S. 454-455 (1948). See also State v. Pena, 200 Neb. 387, 263 N.W.2d 835 (1978); State v. Niedermeyer, 48 Ore.App. 665, 617 P.2d 911 (1980), cert. denied, 450 U.S. 1042 (1981).

A test under which the existence of exigent circumstances turns on the perceived gravity of the crime would significantly hamper law enforcement and burden courts with pointless litigation concerning the nature and gradation of various crimes. The Court relies heavily on Justice Jackson's

Page 466 U. S. 761

concurring opinion in McDonald v. United States, supra, which, in minimizing the gravity of the felony at issue there, illustrates that the need for an evaluation of the seriousness of particular crimes could not be confined to offenses defined by statute as misdemeanors. To the extent that the Court implies that the seriousness of a particular felony is a factor to be considered in deciding whether the need to preserve evidence of that felony constitutes an exigent circumstance justifying a warrantless in-home arrest, I think that its approach is misguided. The decision to arrest without a warrant typically is made in the field under less-than-optimal circumstances; officers have neither the time nor the competence to determine whether a particular offense for which warrantless arrests have been authorized by statute is serious enough to justify a warrantless home entry to prevent the imminent destruction or removal of evidence.

This problem could be lessened by creating a bright-line distinction between felonies and other crimes, but the Court—wisely in my view—does not adopt such an approach. There may have been a time when the line between misdemeanors and felonies marked off those offenses involving a sufficiently serious threat to society to justify warrantless in-home arrests under exigent circumstances. But the category of misdemeanors today includes enough serious offenses to call into question the desirability of such line drawing. See ALI, Model Code of Pre-Arraignment Procedures 131-132 (Prelim.Draft No. 1, 1965) (discussing ultimately rejected provision abandoning "in-presence" requirement for misdemeanor arrests). If I am correct in asserting that a bright-line distinction between felonies and misdemeanors is untenable and that the need to prevent the imminent destruction or removal of evidence of some nonfelony crimes can constitute an exigency justifying warrantless in-home arrests under certain circumstances, the Court's approach will necessitate a case-by-case evaluation of the seriousness of

Page 466 U. S. 762

particular crimes, a difficult task for which officers and courts are poorly equipped.

Even if the Court were correct in concluding that the gravity of the offense is an important factor to consider in determining whether a warrantless in-home arrest is justified by exigent circumstances, it has erred in assessing the seriousness of the civil forfeiture offense for which the officers thought they were arresting Welsh. As the Court observes, the statutory scheme in force at the time of Welsh's arrest provided that the first offense for driving under the influence of alcohol involved no potential incarceration. Wis.Stat. § 346.65(2) (1975). Nevertheless, this Court has long recognized the compelling state interest in highway safety, South Dakota v. Neville, 459 U. S. 553, 459 U. S. 558-559 (1983), the Supreme Court of Wisconsin identified a number of factors suggesting a substantial and growing governmental interest in apprehending and convicting intoxicated drivers and in deterring alcohol-related offenses, 108 Wis.2d at 334–335, 321 N.W.2d at 253–254, and recent actions of the Wisconsin Legislature evince its

"belief that significant benefits, in the reduction of the costs attributable to drunk driving, may be achieved by the increased apprehension and conviction of even first time . . . offenders."

Note, 1983 Wis.L.Rev. 1023, 1053.

The Court ignores these factors, and looks solely to the penalties imposed on first offenders in determining whether the State's interest is sufficient to justify warrantless in-home arrests under exigent circumstances. Ante at 466 U. S. 754. Although the seriousness of the prescribed sanctions is a valuable objective indication of the general normative judgment of the seriousness of the offense, Baldwin v. New York, 399 U. S. 66, 399 U. S. 68 (1970) (plurality opinion), other evidence is available and should not be ignored. United States v. Craner, 652 F.2d 23, 24-27 (CA9 1981); United States v. Woods, 450 F.Supp. 1335, 1340 (Md.1978); Brady v. Blair, 427 F.Supp. 5, 9 (SD Ohio 1976). Although first offenders are subjected

Page 466 U. S. 763

only to civil forfeiture under the Wisconsin statute, the seriousness with which the State regards the crime for which Welsh was arrested is evinced by (1) the fact that defendants charged with driving under the influence are guaranteed the right to a jury trial, Wis.Stat. § 345.43 (1981–1982); (2) the legislative authorization of warrantless arrests for traffic offenses occurring outside the officer's presence, Wis.Stat. § 345.22 (1981–1982); and (3) the collateral consequence of mandatory license revocation that attaches to all convictions for driving under the influence, Wis.Stat. § 343.30(1q) (1981–1982). See also District of Columbia v. Colts, 282 U. S. 63 (1930); United States v. Craner, supra. It is possible, moreover, that the legislature consciously chose to limit the penalties imposed on first offenders in order to increase the ease of conviction and the overall deterrent effect of the enforcement effort. See Comment, 35 Me.L.Rev. 385, 395, n. 35, 399–400, 403 (1983).

In short, the fact that Wisconsin has chosen to punish the first offense for driving under the influence with a fine rather than a prison term does not demand the conclusion that the State's interest in punishing first offenders is insufficiently substantial to justify warrantless in-home arrests under exigent circumstances. As the Supreme Court of Wisconsin observed,

"[t]his is a model case demonstrating the urgency involved in arresting the suspect in order to preserve evidence of the statutory violation."

108 Wis.2d at 338, 321 N.W.2d at 255. We have previously recognized that

"the percentage of alcohol in the blood begins to diminish shortly after drinking stops, as the body functions to eliminate it from the system."

Schmerber v. California, 384 U. S. 757, 384 U. S. 770 (1966). Moreover, a suspect could cast substantial doubt on the validity of a blood or breath test by consuming additional alcohol upon arriving at his home. In light of the promptness with which the officers reached Welsh's house, therefore, I would hold that the need to prevent the imminent and ongoing destruction of evidence of a serious

Page 466 U. S. 764

violation of Wisconsin's traffic laws provided an exigent circumstance justifying the warrantless in-home arrest. See also e.g., People v. Ritchie, 130 Cal.App.3d 455, 181 Cal.Rptr. 773 (1982); People v. Smith, 175 Colo. 212, 486 P.2d 8 (1971); State v. Findlay, 259 Iowa 733, 145 N.W.2d 650 (1966); State v. Amaniera 132 N.J.Super. 597, 334 A.2d 398 (1974); State v. Osburn, 13 Ore.App. 92, 508 P.2d 837 (1973).

I respectfully dissent."

== See also ==
- List of United States Supreme Court cases, volume 466
