= Omnibus Counterterrorism Act of 1995 =

Proposed U.S. federal legislation

The Omnibus Counterterrorism Act of 1995, or US Senate bills S.390 and S.761, were two bills introduced by Senator Joe Biden and Senator Tom Daschle on behalf of the Clinton Administration on February 10, 1995. The bill was cosponsored by Senators Alfonse D'Amato, Dianne Feinstein, Bob Kerrey, Herb Kohl, Jon Kyl, Barbara A. Mikulski and Arlen Specter. Representative Chuck Schumer sponsored the bill (H.R. 896) in the US House of Representatives. Both bills were never put to a vote, although a significantly altered version of the House bill became law as the Antiterrorism and Effective Death Penalty Act of 1996. Much of its rejected proposals were ultimately recycled as the USA PATRIOT Act of 2001 with Joe Biden's vocal endorsement.

Following closely on the heels of Executive Order 12947, prohibiting transactions with terrorists, President Clinton described the bill as a "comprehensive effort to strengthen the ability of the United States to deter terrorist acts and punish those who aid or abet any international terrorist activity in the United States" and requested "the prompt and favorable consideration of this legislative proposal by the Congress".

It contained the following seven provisions:

Title I: Substantive Criminal Law Enhancements

Title II: Immigration Law Improvements

Title III: Controls Over Terrorist Fund-Raising

Title IV: Convention on the Marking of Plastic Explosives

Title V: Nuclear Materials

Title VI: Procedural and Technical Corrections and Improvements

Title VII: Antiterrorism Assistance

According to the summary by President Clinton, the bill was intended to establish federal criminal jurisdiction over acts of international terrorism. Civil liberty advocacy groups opposed the bill on the grounds that it would violate fundamental civil liberties, including the right to confront one's accuser. Another source of opposition was the government's ability to use evidence from secret sources in deportation proceedings for suspected terrorists.

== See also ==
- Antiterrorism and Effective Death Penalty Act of 1996
- Oklahoma City bombing
