= Kotteakos v. United States =

- Supreme Court of the United States

Decided June 10, 1946
- Full case name: Kotteakos v. United States
- Citations: 328 U.S. 750 (more)

Holding
- For a non-constitutional error that affected a defendant's substantial rights, a reviewing court must reverse the judgment unless there is a "fair assurance" that the error did not affect the outcome.

Court membership
- Chief Justice vacant Associate Justices Hugo Black · Stanley F. Reed; Felix Frankfurter · William O. Douglas; Frank Murphy · Robert H. Jackson; Wiley B. Rutledge · Harold H. Burton

Case opinions
- Majority: Rutledge
- Concurrence: Black
- Jackson took no part in the consideration or decision of the case.

Kotteakos v. United States, 328 U.S. 750 (1946), was a United States Supreme Court case in which the court held that for a non-constitutional error that affected a defendant's substantial rights, a reviewing court must reverse the judgment unless there is a "fair assurance" that the error did not affect the outcome. This case articulated the Kotteakos standard: an error is harmless unless it "had a substantial and injurious effect or influence in determining the jury's verdict."

== Background ==
Kotteakos and 31 others were indicted under § 37 of the Criminal Code for a single general conspiracy to violate the National Housing Act by inducing lending institutions to make loans which would be offered to the Federal Housing Administration for insurance on the basis of false and fraudulent information. Nineteen defendants were brought to trial, and the cases of 13 were submitted to the jury. The evidence proved eight or more different conspiracies by separate groups of defendants which had no connection with each other except that all utilized one Brown as a broker to handle fraudulent applications. Evidence of dealings between Brown and defendants other than Kotteakos was admitted against Kotteakos, and the judge instructed the jury that only one conspiracy was charged and that the acts and declarations of one conspirator bound all. Kotteakos and six other defendants were convicted.

== Opinion of the court ==
The Supreme Court issued an opinion on June 10, 1946. The Supreme Court reversed the convictions, finding that the single conspiracy charge was prejudicial and that the defendants should have been tried separately for their individual conspiracies .

== Subsequent developments ==
For constitutional errors, the Supreme Court announced in Chapman v. California that the standard to find them harmless was "beyond a reasonable doubt."
