= Sole v. Wyner =

- Supreme Court of the United States

Decided June 4, 2007
- Full case name: Sole v. Wyner
- Citations: 551 U.S. 74 (more)

Holding
- A party who achieves a preliminary injunction in a Section 1983 case is not a prevailing party for the purposes of attorneys fees if that preliminary injunction expires and is not converted into a permanent injunction.

Court membership
- Chief Justice John Roberts Associate Justices John P. Stevens · Antonin Scalia; Anthony Kennedy · David Souter; Clarence Thomas · Ruth Bader Ginsburg; Stephen Breyer · Samuel Alito

Case opinion
- Majority: Ginsburg, joined by unanimous

Laws applied
- 42 U.S.C. § 1988

Sole v. Wyner, 551 U.S. 74 (2007), was a United States Supreme Court case in which the court held that a party who achieves a preliminary injunction in a Section 1983 case is not a prevailing party for the purposes of an attorney fee award if that preliminary injunction expires and is not converted into a permanent injunction.

== Background ==
In private actions under 42 U. S. C. §1983, federal district courts may "allow the prevailing party... a reasonable attorney's fee as part of the costs." This is stated in §1988(b).

Wyner notified the Florida Department of Environmental Protection (DEP), in mid-January 2003, of her intention to create on Valentine's Day, within John D. MacArthur Beach State Park, an antiwar artwork consisting of nude people assembled into a peace sign. Responding on February 6, DEP informed Wyner that her display would be lawful only if the participants complied with Florida's "Bathing Suit Rule," which requires patrons of state parks to wear, at a minimum, a thong and, if female, a bikini top. To safeguard her display, and future nude expressive activities, against police interference, Wyner and a co-plaintiff (collectively Wyner) sued Florida officials in the federal District Court on February 12. Invoking the First Amendment's protection of expressive conduct, Wyner requested immediate injunctive relief against interference with the peace-sign display and permanent injunctive relief against interference with future activities similarly involving nudity. An attachment to the complaint set out a 1995 settlement with DEP permitting Wyner to stage a play with nude performers at MacArthur Beach provided the area was screened off to shield beachgoers who did not wish to see the play.

The District Court granted Wyner a preliminary injunction on February 13, suggesting that a curtain or screen could satisfy the interests of both the State and Wyner. The peace-symbol display that took place the next day was set up outside a barrier apparently put up by the State. Once disassembled from the peace symbol formation, participants went into the water in the nude. Thereafter, Wyner pursued her demand for a permanent injunction, noting that she intended to put on another Valentine's Day production at MacArthur Beach, again involving nudity. After discovery, both sides moved for summary judgment. At a January 21, 2004 hearing, Wyner's counsel acknowledged that the peace-symbol display participants had set up in front of the barrier. The court denied plaintiff's motion for summary judgment and granted defendants' motion for summary final judgment. The deliberate failure of Wyner and her coparticipants to stay behind the screen at the 2003 Valentine's Day display, the court concluded, demonstrated that the Bathing Suit Rule's prohibition of nudity was essential to protect the visiting public.

While Wyner ultimately failed to prevail on the merits, the court added, she did obtain a preliminary injunction, and therefore qualified as a prevailing party to that extent. Reasoning that the preliminary injunction could not be revisited at the second stage of the litigation because it had expired, the court awarded plaintiff counsel fees covering the first phase of the litigation.

The Florida officials appealed, challenging both the preliminary injunction and the counsel fees award. The Eleventh Circuit Court of Appeals held first that defendants' challenges to the preliminary injunction were moot. The court then affirmed the counsel fees award, reasoning that the preliminary order allowed Wyner to present the peace-symbol display unimpeded by adverse state action.

== Opinion of the court ==
The Supreme Court issued an opinion on June 4, 2007.
