= Safeco Insurance Co. v. Burr =

- Supreme Court of the United States

Decided June 4, 2007
- Full case name: Safeco Insurance Co. v. Burr
- Citations: 551 U.S. 47 (more)

Holding
- Where "willfulness" is a statutory condition of civil liability, it generally includes both knowing violations of a standard and reckless violations.

Court membership
- Chief Justice John Roberts Associate Justices John P. Stevens · Antonin Scalia; Anthony Kennedy · David Souter; Clarence Thomas · Ruth Bader Ginsburg; Stephen Breyer · Samuel Alito

Case opinions
- Majority: Souter, joined by Roberts, Kennedy, Breyer; Scalia (all but footnotes); Thomas, Alito (all but Part III-A); Stevens, Ginsburg (Parts I, II, III–A, and IV–B)
- Concurrence: Stevens (in part), joined by Ginsburg
- Concurrence: Thomas (in part), joined by Alito

Laws applied
- Fair Credit Reporting Act

Safeco Insurance Co. v. Burr (consolidated with GEICO General Insurance Co. v. Edo), 551 U.S. 47 (2007), is a United States Supreme Court case in which the court held that where "willfulness" is a statutory condition of civil liability, it generally includes both knowing violations of a standard and reckless violations.

Safeco Insurance Co. of America v. Burr was consolidated with GEICO General Insurance Co. v. Edo in 2006.

Following the decision of the Ninth Circuit Court of Appeals, in 2006, a joint amicus brief was submitted to the U.S. Supreme Court, which had agreed to review the case, in support of petitioners Safeco and Geico by the Financial Services Roundtable, Chamber of Commerce of the United States of America, Business Roundtable, Mortgage Bankers Association, American Bankers Association, American Financial Services Association, America’s Community Bankers, and Consumer Bankers Association.
