= List of United States Supreme Court cases, volume 466 =

This is a list of all the United States Supreme Court cases from volume 466 of the United States Reports:

Case name	Citation	Date decided
Koehler v. Engle	466 U.S. 1	1984
Jefferson Parish Hosp. Dist. v. Hyde	466 U.S. 2	1984
Escambia Cnty. v. McMillan	466 U.S. 48	1984
EEOC v. Shell Oil Co.	466 U.S. 54	1984
Louisiana v. Mississippi	466 U.S. 96	1984
United States v. Jacobsen	466 U.S. 109	1984
The fact that employees of a private company independently open a package and make an examination that may be impermissible for a government agent does not mean that a subsequent search by a government agent that is prompted by the private discovery is automatically unreasonable.
Arizona v. California	466 U.S. 144	1984
Baldwin Cnty. v. Brown	466 U.S. 147	1984
Oliver v. United States	466 U.S. 170	1984
Summa Corp. v. California ex rel. State Lands Comm'n	466 U.S. 198	1984
INS v. Delgado	466 U.S. 210	1984
Interrogation relating to one's identity or a request for identification by the police does not, by itself, constitute a Fourth Amendment seizure. Unless the circumstances of the encounter are so intimidating as to demonstrate that a reasonable person would have believed they were not free to leave if they had not responded, such questioning does not result in a detention under the Fourth Amendment.
TWA v. Franklin Mint Corp.	466 U.S. 243	1984
Legislative silence is not sufficient to abrogate a treaty.
McDonald v. West Branch	466 U.S. 284	1984
In a Section 1983 action, a federal court should not afford res judicata or collateral estoppel effect to an award in an arbitration proceeding brought pursuant to the terms of a collective bargaining agreement.
Justices v. Lydon	466 U.S. 294	1984
James v. Kentucky	466 U.S. 341	1984
Limbach v. Hooven & Allison Co.	466 U.S. 353	1984
Schneider Moving & Storage Co. v. Robbins	466 U.S. 364	1984
Bd. of Educ. v. Vail	466 U.S. 377	1984
Affirmed by an equally divided court. Marshall recused.
Capital Cities Media, Inc. v. Toole	466 U.S. 378	1984
Florida v. Meyers	466 U.S. 380	1984
The justification to conduct a warrantless search of a car that has been stopped on the road—based on probable cause to believe there is evidence of crime inside it—does not vanish once the car has been impounded and immobilized. A second, warrentless search is still permitted at a later time.
Westinghouse Elec. Corp. v. Tully	466 U.S. 388	1984
Helicopteros Nacionales de Colombia, S.A. v. Hall	466 U.S. 408	1984
Palmore v. Sidoti	466 U.S. 429	1984
Ellis v. Ry. Clerks	466 U.S. 435	1984
FCC v. ITT World Communications, Inc.	466 U.S. 463	1984
United States v. Rodgers	466 U.S. 475	1984
Bose Corp. v. Consumers Union	466 U.S. 485	1984
Westinghouse Elec. Corp. v. Vaughn	466 U.S. 521	1984
Pulliam v. Allen	466 U.S. 522	1984
Hoover v. Ronwin	466 U.S. 558	1984
Heckler v. Ringer	466 U.S. 602	1984
United States v. Cronic	466 U.S. 648	1984
Strickland v. Washington	466 U.S. 668	1984
NLRB v. Ironworkers	466 U.S. 720	1984
The Court of Appeals may not refuse to enforce a backpay order merely because of the NLRB's delay subsequent to that order in formulating a backpay specification.
Massachusetts v. Upton	466 U.S. 727	1984
Welsh v. Wisconsin	466 U.S. 740	1984
Escondido Mut. Water Co. v. Mission Indians	466 U.S. 765	1984
City of Los Angeles v. Taxpayers for Vincent	466 U.S. 789	1984
