= Brecht v. Abrahamson =

- Supreme Court of the United States

Argued December 1, 1992 Decided April 21, 1993
- Full case name: Brecht v. Abrahamson
- Citations: 507 U.S. 619 (more)
- Argument: Oral argument
- Opinion announcement: Opinion announcement

Case history
- Prior: 944 F.2d 1363 (CA7 1991)

Holding
- The Kotteakos harmless-error standard, rather than the Chapman standard, applies in determining whether habeas relief must be granted because of unconstitutional "trial error" such as the Doyle error at issue.

Court membership
- Chief Justice William Rehnquist Associate Justices Byron White · Harry Blackmun; John P. Stevens · Sandra Day O'Connor; Antonin Scalia · Anthony Kennedy; David Souter · Clarence Thomas

Case opinions
- Majority: Rehnquist, joined by Stevens, Scalia, Kennedy, Thomas
- Concurrence: Stevens
- Dissent: White, joined by Blackmun; Souter (except the footnote and part III)
- Dissent: Blackmun
- Dissent: O'Connor
- Dissent: Souter

Brecht v. Abrahamson, 507 U.S. 619 (1993), was a United States Supreme Court case decided in 1993. The Court held that, when federal courts are deciding whether to grant habeas relief due to unconstitutional error at trial, they should use the harmless error standard outlined in Kotteakos v. United States to assess such claims.
