= Strickland v. Washington =

- Supreme Court of the United States

Argued January 10, 1984 Decided May 14, 1984
- Full case name: Strickland, Superintendent, Florida State Prison, v. Washington
- Citations: 466 U.S. 668 (more) 104 S. Ct. 2052; 80 L. Ed. 2d 674

Case history
- Prior: Writ of habeas corpus denied by the United States District Court for the Southern District of Florida; reversed by the Eleventh Circuit, 693 F.2d 1243 (11th Cir. 1982); cert. granted, 462 U.S. 1105 (1983).

Holding
- To obtain relief because of ineffective assistance of counsel, a criminal defendant must show both that counsel's performance fell below an objective standard of reasonableness and that counsel's deficient performance gives rise to a reasonable probability that if counsel had performed adequately, the result of the proceeding would have been different.

Court membership
- Chief Justice Warren E. Burger Associate Justices William J. Brennan Jr. · Byron White; Thurgood Marshall · Harry Blackmun; Lewis F. Powell Jr. · William Rehnquist; John P. Stevens · Sandra Day O'Connor

Case opinions
- Majority: O'Connor, joined by Burger, White, Blackmun, Powell, Rehnquist, Stevens
- Concur/dissent: Brennan
- Dissent: Marshall

Laws applied
- U.S. Const. amend. VI

Strickland v. Washington, 466 U.S. 668 (1984), is a landmark Supreme Court case that established the standard for determining when a criminal defendant's Sixth Amendment right to counsel is violated by that counsel's inadequate performance.

The decision was a compromise by the majority in which the varying "tests for ineffective performance of counsel" among the federal circuits and state supreme courts were forced into a singular middle ground test. State governments are free to create a test even more favorable to an appellant.

== Background ==
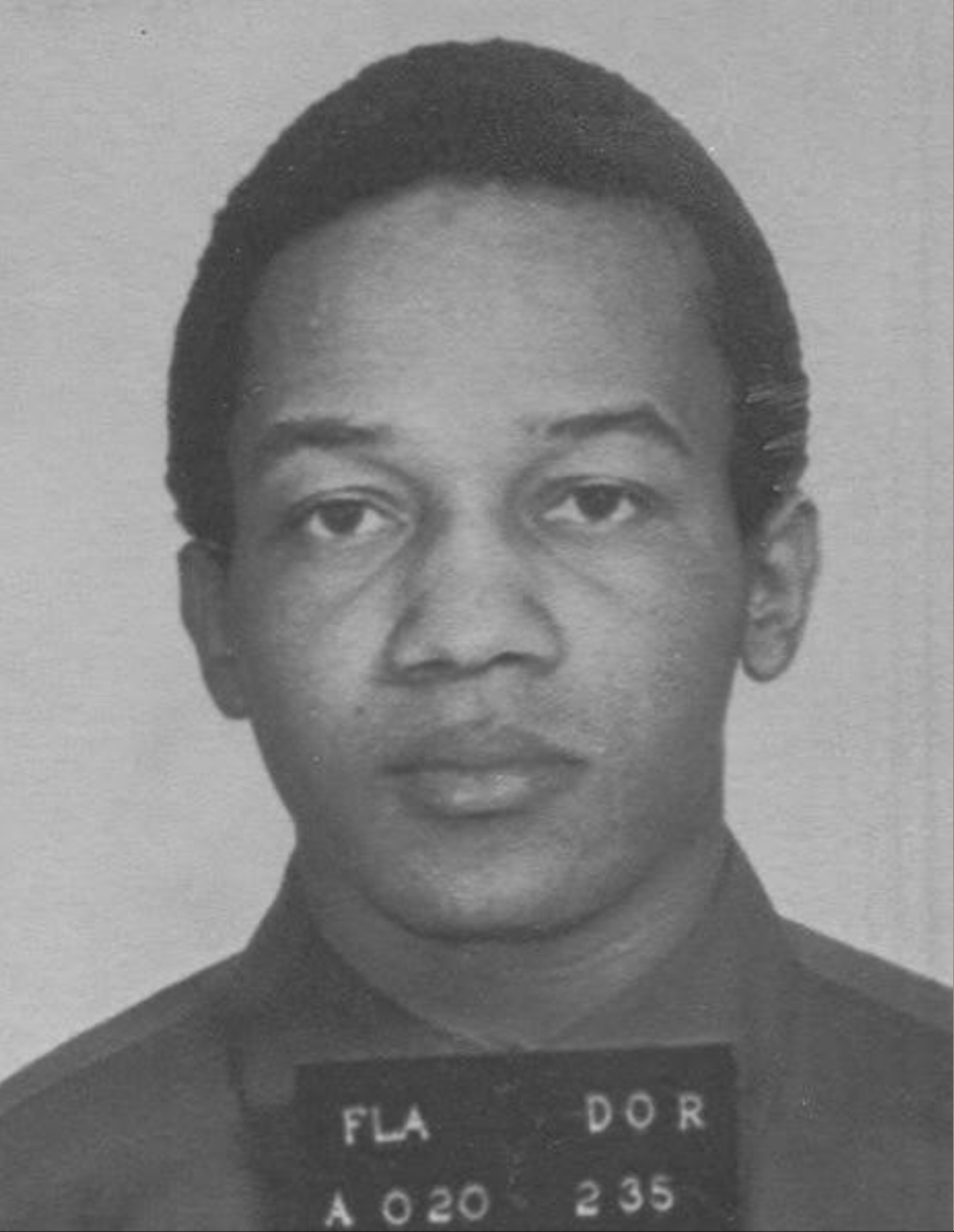
David Leroy Washington

David Leroy Washington and an accomplice decided to rob and kill Daniel Pridgen, on September 20, 1976. The Supreme Court of Florida said the motive for the killing was Pridgen's homosexuality. Washington's accomplice lured Pridgen to bed and covered his face with a pillow while Washington stabbed him to death. Three days later they went to the home of Katrina Birk who they knew as a "fence" where they killed her and severely wounded several other occupants. On September 27 they contacted Frank Meli and convinced him to come to Washington's home under the pretense of concluding an automobile sale. Washington tied Meli to his bed where he was held captive for two days. On September 29, Washington stabbed Meli eleven times and buried the body in his backyard.

== Case history ==
Washington pled guilty in a Florida trial court to an indictment that included three capital murder charges. During the plea colloquy, Washington admitted to some past burglaries. He told the trial he had no significant criminal record and committed the crimes under extreme stress caused by his inability to support his family. The trial judge told Washington that he had "a great deal of respect for people who are willing to step forward and admit their responsibility."

Finding numerous aggravating circumstances and no significant mitigating circumstances, the trial judge sentenced Washington to death on each of the murder counts. The Florida Supreme Court affirmed Washington's sentences on direct appeal.

Washington then sought collateral relief in state court alleging, inter alia, ineffective assistance at the sentencing proceeding. The trial court denied relief based on the record evidence. They found that "the record affirmatively demonstrates beyond any doubt that even if [counsel] had done each of the... things [that respondent alleged counsel had failed to do at the time of sentencing, there is not even the remotest chance that the outcome would have been any different. The plain fact is that the aggravating circumstances proved in this case were completely overwhelming..." The Florida Supreme Court affirmed Washington's sentences on direct appeal, holding that:

[A] confession plus numerous aggravating factors limit the alternatives of the most zealous of advocates...counsel's failure to investigate medical reports and cross-examine the medical examiners could not be prejudicial since the facts of the reports were admitted by defendant in his confession. Under the circumstances cross-examination could have accomplished little. Indeed, cross-examination is a trial tactic choice properly within counsel's discretion.

Washington then filed a habeas corpus petition in federal district court alleging, inter alia, ineffective assistance of counsel based on the same errors asserted in the state court. After an evidentiary hearing at which the trial judge testified the district court concluded that "there does not appear to be a likelihood, or even a significant possibility" that any errors made by trial counsel had prejudiced the outcome at sentencing.

The United States Court of Appeals for the Fifth Circuit said "the district court employed an incorrect method of analysis". By holding that Washington had failed to show prejudice "the district court was, apparently, borrowing from the analysis employed in Knight and DeCoster which require that a petitioner carry the burden" of showing prejudice. They also said "the court erred in attaching any probative value whatsoever to Judge Fuller's testimony" about whether the errors asserted by Washington would have made a difference at sentencing. After the Fifth Circuit Court of Appeals Reorganization Act of 1980 divided the Fifth Circuit, the newly created United States Court of Appeals for the Eleventh Circuit decided to rehear the case en banc and reversed the Fifth Circuit's ruling, stating that the Sixth Amendment accorded criminal defendants a right to "reasonably effective" counsel. After outlining standards for judging whether defense counsel fulfilled the duty to investigate nonstatutory mitigating circumstances and whether counsel's errors were sufficiently prejudicial to justify reversal, it remanded the case for application of the standards.

The State of Florida (Note: Strickland was the Superintendent of the Florida State Prison, where Washington was incarcerated upon his sentencing.) appealed the decision to the United States Supreme Court, which granted certiorari.

== Supreme Court ==
=== Opinion of the Court ===
The Court, in a decision by Justice O'Connor, established a two-part test for an ineffective assistance of counsel claim:

- Counsel's performance "fell below an objective standard of reasonableness"
- Counsel's "deficient performance prejudiced the defense"

The Supreme Court began its decision with the idea that the Sixth Amendment right to counsel "plays a crucial role in the adversarial system embodied in the Sixth Amendment". Even after McMann v. Richardson stated in dictum that "the right to counsel is the right to effective counsel" confusion persisted in Circuit Courts about the standard for constitutionally "adequate legal assistance".

The Strickland standard is based on the Sixth Amendment's purpose to protect the right to a fair trial guaranteed by the Due Process Clause:

The benchmark for judging any claim of ineffectiveness must be whether counsel's conduct so undermined the proper functioning of the adversarial system that the trial cannot be relied on as having produced a just result.

In order to show that counsel's performance was "deficient," the defendant must show that it fell below an "objective standard of reasonableness." The Court emphasized that there is no "checklist for judicial evaluation of attorney performance". Citing Decoster III the Court asserted that a checklist "would interfere with the constitutionally protected independence of counsel and restrict the wide latitude counsel must have in making tactical decisions."

Counsel does, however, have a duty to make "reasonable investigations, or to make a reasonable decision that makes particular investigations unnecessary." After all, strategic decisions made in light of a reasonable investigation and compared to plausible options are "virtually unchallengeable". By contrast, strategic choices made after less than complete investigation are reasonable only to the extent that "reasonable professional judgments" justify the curtailment of counsel's investigation. Counsel is strongly presumed to have "made all significant decisions in the exercise of reasonable professional judgment".

However, not all errors on counsel's part justify setting aside the judgment; rather, they must prejudice the defendant's ability to receive a fair trial. In certain circumstances, such as when the defendant has had no counsel at all or when counsel has labored under a conflict of interest, the Court will presume prejudice, but ordinarily, the defendant must show that counsel's deficient performance had an adverse effect on the defense. Since the goal is to ensure that the defendant had a fair trial, the defendant must show that there is a reasonable probability that, but for counsel's errors, the result of the proceeding would have been different.

The Court outlined several crucial guidelines to consider when applying the Strickland test: most importantly, the Court found that a "mechanical" application of the test was the wrong approach.

A reasonable probability is one sufficient to undermine confidence in the outcome. When the defendant challenges his conviction, he must show that counsel's errors prevented the jury from forming a reasonable doubt as to his guilt. When he challenges a death sentence, as Washington is doing, he must show a reasonable probability that the sentencer would have balanced the aggravation and mitigation evidence differently. The assessments must be made with respect to the totality of the evidence presented at the hearing so that when the prosecution's case is weak, the defendant will more easily show prejudice.

Applying the test to Washington's case, the Court concluded that counsel did not perform deficiently and that Washington suffered no prejudice. The counsel's decision to focus on remorse and emotional distress was a reasonable strategic decision in light of the trial judge's stated views on remorse, the heinousness of Washington's crimes, and Washington's own statements to counsel. In view of those considerations, the Court could not conclude that additional mitigating evidence would have given rise to a reasonable probability that the trial judge would have sentenced Washington to life in prison rather than death.

The majority reversed the judgment of the Court of Appeals.

=== Concurring opinion ===
Justice Brennan concurred in the result because he believed that the Court's new test for ineffective assistance, particularly the prejudice prong, would not impede the presentation of mitigating evidence on behalf of capital defendants:

Counsel's general duty to investigate ... takes on supreme importance to a defendant in the context of developing mitigating evidence to present to a judge or jury considering the sentence of death; claims of ineffective assistance in the performance of that duty should therefore be considered with commensurate care.

However, because Justice Brennan believed that the death penalty is in all circumstances cruel and unusual punishment, he would have vacated Washington's death sentence and remanded for further proceedings.

=== Dissenting opinion ===
Justice Marshall dissented from the majority's holding.

He objected that the Court's newly crafted test was unlikely to "improve the adjudication of Sixth Amendment claims." He considered the performance standard "so malleable that, in practice, it will either have no grip at all or will yield excessive variation in the manner in which the Sixth Amendment is interpreted and applied by different courts." What does "reasonable" mean? Should counsel's performance be judged by reference to a reasonable paid attorney or a reasonable appointed one? After all, Marshall pointed out, "a person of means, by selecting a lawyer and paying him enough to ensure he prepares thoroughly, usually can obtain better representation than that available to an indigent defendant, who must rely on appointed counsel, who, in turn, has limited time and resources to devote to a given case." Marshall also disputed that counsel's performance must be given especially wide latitude, since "much of the work involved in preparing for trial, applying for bail, conferring with one's client, making timely objections to significant, arguably erroneous rulings of the trial judge, and filing a notice of appeal if there are colorable grounds therefor could profitably be made the subject of uniform standards."

Marshall also disputed that it should be made the defendant's burden to show prejudice from an allegedly incompetent attorney's performance. Prejudice cannot be measured solely with respect to the fairness of the outcome of the trial; the fairness of the procedure matters just as much. "The majority contends that the Sixth Amendment is not violated when a manifestly guilty defendant is convicted after a trial in which he was represented by a manifestly ineffective attorney. I cannot agree."

Marshall worried that the Court's admonition to future judges, presented with ineffective assistance claims should defer to counsel's strategic judgments, placed too heavy a burden on defendants making such claims.

Finally, Marshall took issue with the Court's conclusion that the same standard for ineffectiveness should apply in a capital sentencing proceeding as applies at an ordinary trial. The capital sentencing process is intended to be especially reliable, and "reliability in the imposition of the death sentence can be approximated only if the sentencer is fully informed of all possible relevant information about the individual defendant whose fate it must determine." The defendant's attorney is responsible for doing that. That and in light of the "severity and irrevocability of the sanction at stake," the standard for effective assistance in capital sentencing proceedings must be especially stringent. Accordingly, Marshall believed that a person on death row seeking relief from his death sentence on grounds of ineffective assistance should not have to show a reasonable probability that he would not have received a death sentence if counsel had presented more mitigating evidence. Because it was clear that Washington's attorney had failed to investigate and then present large amounts of information to the sentencing judge, Marshall concluded that Washington's lawyer was ineffective.

== Subsequent events ==
Washington was executed on July 13, 1984, two months after the Supreme Court's decision.

== See also ==
- List of United States Supreme Court cases, volume 466
- Wiggins v. Smith (2003)
- Premo v. Moore (2011)
