= Chapman v. California =

- Supreme Court of the United States

Argued December 7–8, 1966 Decided February 20, 1967
- Full case name: Ruth Elizabeth Chapman and Thomas Leroy Teale v. California
- Docket no.: 95
- Citations: 386 U.S. 18 (more) 17 L. Ed. 2d 705, 87 S. Ct. 824
- Argument: Oral argument

Case history
- Prior: Conviction (1963), affirmed, People v. Teale, 63 Cal. 2d 178 (1965)

Holding
- 1) Violations of federally-protected rights must be governed by a federal harmless-error rule, not state rules, and 2) such errors are not harmless unless the state proves beyond a reasonable doubt that the error complained of did not contribute to the verdict obtained.

Court membership
- Chief Justice Earl Warren Associate Justices Hugo Black · William O. Douglas; Tom C. Clark · John M. Harlan II; William J. Brennan Jr. · Potter Stewart; Byron White · Abe Fortas

Case opinions
- Majority: Black, joined by Warren, Douglas, Clark, Brennan, White, and Fortas
- Concurrence: Stewart
- Dissent: Harlan

Laws applied
- U.S. Const. amends. V, XIV

Chapman v. California, 386 U.S. 18 (1967), was a decision by the Supreme Court of the United States that a federal "harmless error" rule must apply, instead of equivalent state rules, for reviewing trials where federally-protected rights had been violated. Further, a constitutional error in a criminal case cannot be held harmless unless it was harmless "beyond a reasonable doubt."

== Background ==
=== Legal background ===
"Harmless error" rules were a well-established aspect of American law, having originated in English common law. The basic idea was that a legal error during trial (such as a violation of the rules of evidence, or a violation of a constitutional trial right) could be grounds for overturning the result of the trial—unless the error was "harmless." There were differing opinions, though, on what "harmless" should mean; in the words of legal scholar William Howard, ". . .the crux of the harmless error controversy has been whether rules of evidence are a mere means to the ascertainment of truth or are themselves an end, to be followed sometimes at the expense of the truth . . . courts in the majority of American jurisdictions ultimately chose the latter." All 50 states had harmless-error laws by the time Chapman v. California was decided.

=== Factual background ===
On October 17, 1962, Ruth Elizabeth Chapman and Thomas Leroy Teale arrived together at a motel in Fresno, California, renting a room with a bad check. Around 10 pm, they were seen at a tavern in nearby Lodi, and they stayed there drinking beer for about three hours. They were then seen around 2 am at another bar, the Spot Club, where the only people inside were Chapman, Teale, and the bartender, a man named Billy Dean Adcock. Shortly after, witnesses saw three people outside of the bar: Adcock, who was locking the door, and two people who matched the descriptions of Chapman and Teale.

The next morning, the Spot Club was found in disarray, with $260 missing, papers from the register scattered around, and Adcock's routine tasks left undone. Adcock's body was found later that morning in a ditch north of Lodi with three bullet wounds in his head and about $50 missing from his wallet. Chapman was arrested in St. Louis on October 26, and Teale was arrested in New Orleans on November 2.

== Procedural history in lower courts ==
=== Trial ===
Chapman and Teale were charged with murder, robbery, and kidnapping, and a joint trial was held April 16, 1963. The prosecution's evidence included traces of Adcock's blood found on both defendants' clothes, paint inside their car that likely came from Adcock's shoes, and witnesses who said they'd seen them that night (i.e., at the Spot Club). There was also a prisoner who testified about conversations he'd had with Teale after Teale was arrested, where Teale had said incriminating things like, "they were arguing over money all afternoon, and he said it was his idea to rob him."

Neither of the defendants testified. The California Constitution at the time said (in Article I § 13), "in any criminal case, whether the defendant testifies or not, his failure to explain or to deny by his testimony any evidence or facts in the case against him may be commented upon by the court and by counsel, and may be considered by the court or the jury." As such, the prosecution spoke extensively and repeatedly about their failure to testify, arguing that their silence meant they couldn't refute the evidence. (Note: A compilation of the prosecution's references to the defendants' failure to testify, as taken from the trial transcript, was including as a 16-page appendix to the Chapman opinion.) The trial judge also included in the jury instructions an instruction that they could draw adverse inferences from the defendants' failure to testify. They were both convicted, with Teale being given a death sentence, and Chapman sentenced to life imprisonment.

=== Appeal ===
On an appeal to the California Supreme Court, Chapman and Teale argued a range of issues, which were generally flimsy legal arguments (including their right to a speedy trial, particular instructions issued to the jury, and whether various items should have been allowed as evidence), and the Court ruled against them on almost all of them. (Note: The Court did rule that Chapman had been improperly sentenced. Since the robbery, kidnapping, and murder were "inseparable," she could only be sentenced for the most serious charge. This did not apply to Teale, because he'd been given the death sentence.) However, after the trial in 1963, the U.S. Supreme Court had issued its opinion in Griffin v. California, striking down the part of the California Constitution that allowed prosecutors to comment on defendants' failure to testify (as a violation of the Fifth Amendment's right to silence). There was no question that the prosecution's extensive comments violated the Fifth Amendment in this case, but the California Supreme Court still had to consider whether the violation was a harmless error. Under the California harmless error rule, Chapman and Teale had to prove that the error "resulted in a miscarriage of justice," and the Court ruled to the contrary:

It clearly appears that the error in allowing the comments and in giving the improper instruction could not have resulted in a miscarriage of justice as to the defendant Teale. While he may not have confessed to the crime, nevertheless the admissions which he made to his fellow inmate are so damaging that, when considered with the other substantial evidence, the proof of his guilt must be deemed overwhelming. His statements, of course, were not admissible against the defendant Chapman. Nevertheless the persuasive, circumstantial web of evidence which implicated her was not refuted, and the only real defense which she urged at the trial level was her claimed inability to form a criminal intent, which she sought to establish through expert witnesses. The comments and instruction on her failure to explain away the circumstantial web of evidence become of less significance in view of the defense's complete failure to refute such evidence by any means whatsoever. That evidence, in effect, stands unchallenged and the prosecutor's and court's remarks add little to its stature.

— People v. Teale, 63 Cal. 2d 178 (1965) (Justice Paul Peek, writing for the court)

== Decision of the Supreme Court ==
=== Majority opinion ===
Chapman and Teale appealed to the U.S. Supreme Court, which reversed in an 8–1 vote. Writing for the majority, Justice Black first said that California's harmless error rule could not apply to violations of the Fifth Amendment. Rather, federal rights had to be protected by federal law:

We have no hesitation in saying that the right of these petitioners not to be punished for exercising their Fifth and Fourteenth Amendment right to be silent—expressly created by the Federal Constitution itself—is a federal right which, in the absence of appropriate congressional action, it is our responsibility to protect by fashioning the necessary rule.

— Chapman v. California, 386 U.S. at 21 (Justice Black, writing for the majority)

Still, the majority did not buy Chapman and Teale's argument that their convictions should overturned just because their right to silence had been violated. The majority noted that all 50 states had harmless error rules, and that Congress had instructed federal courts in 28 U. S. C. § 2111 that "judgments shall not be reversed for 'errors or defects which do not affect the substantial rights of the parties.'" Thus the argument that "all trial errors which violate the Constitution automatically call for reversal" had little support in contemporary legal practice or Supreme Court precedent, and a new federal harmless error rule would be formulated.

The majority decided to borrow the reasoning the Court had used in Fahy v. Connecticut in 1963, when it had said, "The question is whether there is a reasonable possibility that the evidence complained of might have contributed to the conviction." Also, the majority disliked the fact that California's rule put the burden of proof on defendants to show a miscarriage of justice. The new rule would instead "requir[e] the beneficiary of a constitutional error to prove beyond a reasonable doubt that the error complained of did not contribute to the verdict obtained."

Applying the new rule to Chapman and Teale's trial, the majority found that the prosecution's extensive comments on their silence was easily enough to create a reasonable doubt. Even if the case against them was strong, they had tried to make arguments in defense, and these arguments had been undermined by encouraging the jury to draw adverse inferences from their failure to testify—especially given how often the prosecution had referred to it. Their convictions were therefore reversed, and remanded for a new trial.

=== Stewart's concurrence ===
Justice Stewart concurred, but he wrote, separately, to argue that some constitutional violations could never be harmless. He listed examples of recent Supreme Court cases where the Court had reversed convictions without requiring any proof of harm; for example, the Court had said in Lynumn v. Illinois that it was "impermissible" to apply a harmless error rule to the use of an involuntary confession as evidence. Stewart worried that the majority opinion could be interpreted as requiring harmless error analysis in all situations and for all violations of the Constitution.

=== Harlan's dissent ===
Justice Harlan argued in dissent that the majority's new rule exceeded the Court's authority:

I regard the Court's assumption of what amounts to a general supervisory power over the trial of federal constitutional issues in state courts as a startling constitutional development that is wholly out of keeping with our federal system and completely unsupported by the Fourteenth Amendment where the source of such a power must be found.

— Chapman v. California, 385 U.S. at 46 (Justice Harlan, dissenting)

Harlan argued that there was an important distinction between the Supreme Court's power to enforce the Constitution (which applied to every unit of state government in the country through the Fourteenth Amendment), and the supervisory power that the Court held over federal courts. As a supervisory authority, the Supreme Court not only heard appeals from lower federal courts, but could almost make administrative decisions, such as issuing rules of procedure (civil procedure, appellate procedure, etc.) or rules of evidence. In Harlan's view, a harmless-error rule was just another procedural rule, and that meant that federal courts had to respect state versions of the rule when they were applied in state court.
