= Harmless error =

Legal concept

In United States law, a harmless error is a ruling by a trial judge that, although mistaken, does not meet the burden for a losing party to reverse the original decision of the trier of fact on appeal, or to warrant a new trial. Harmless error is easiest to understand in an evidentiary context. Evidentiary errors are subject to harmless error analysis, under Federal Rule of Evidence 103(a) ("Error may not be predicated upon a ruling which admits or excludes evidence unless a substantial right of the party is affected.") The general burden when arguing that evidence was improperly excluded or included is to show that the proper ruling by the trial judge may have, on the balance of probabilities, resulted in the opposite determination of fact.

In the case of Earll v. State of Wyoming, the Wyoming Supreme Court distinguished between reversible error (which requires a conviction be overturned) and harmless error (which does not), as follows:

Before we hold that an error has affected an accused’s substantial right, thus requiring reversal of a conviction, we must conclude that, based on the entire record, a reasonable possibility exists that, in the absence of the error, the verdict might have been more favorable to the accused.

In the evidentiary context, a harmless error is usually one where the evidence had no relevance to the issues to be decided by the trier of fact, evidence admitted actually helped the party seeking the reversal, or the remaining evidence was overwhelmingly against the party seeking reversal.

For example, a prosecutor may try to bolster his case by bringing in an expert witness to explain the behavior of one of the key witnesses. If the judge allows the expert to testify that there was a reason to explain away inconsistencies in the witness's testimony, this will most likely be grounds for an appeal, as in most cases evidence that only bolsters the credibility of a witness is not admissible. However, if there were a number of other witnesses against the losing party, the appellate court may rule that this mistake was of no consequence and that even if the evidence had been excluded, the losing party would have lost.

Federal Rule of Criminal Procedure 52(a) provides that "Any error, defect, irregularity or variance which does not affect substantial rights shall be disregarded."

In the Philippines, the harmless error rule is found in Section 6, Rule 51 of the 1997 Rules of Civil Procedure relating to appeals before the Court of Appeals: "No error in either the admission or the exclusion of evidence and no error or defect in any ruling or order or in anything done or omitted by the trial court or by any of the parties is ground for granting a new trial or for setting aside, modifying, or otherwise disturbing a judgment or order, unless refusal to take such action appears to the court inconsistent with substantial justice. The court at every stage of the proceeding must disregard any error or defect which does not affect the substantial rights of the parties."

When an error is a constitutional violation, courts apply one of two levels of error analysis. If it is a structural error, the reviewing court must automatically reverse. If not, the court applies a constitutional harmless error analysis that is based on the particular right that was violated. For example, the party that benefited from the error may need to prove the error was harmless beyond a reasonable doubt.

== See also ==
- Standard of review
