= 2006 term United States Supreme Court opinions of John Paul Stevens =

The 2006 term of the Supreme Court of the United States began October 2, 2006, and concluded September 30, 2007. This was the thirty-second term of Associate Justice John Paul Stevens's tenure on the Court.
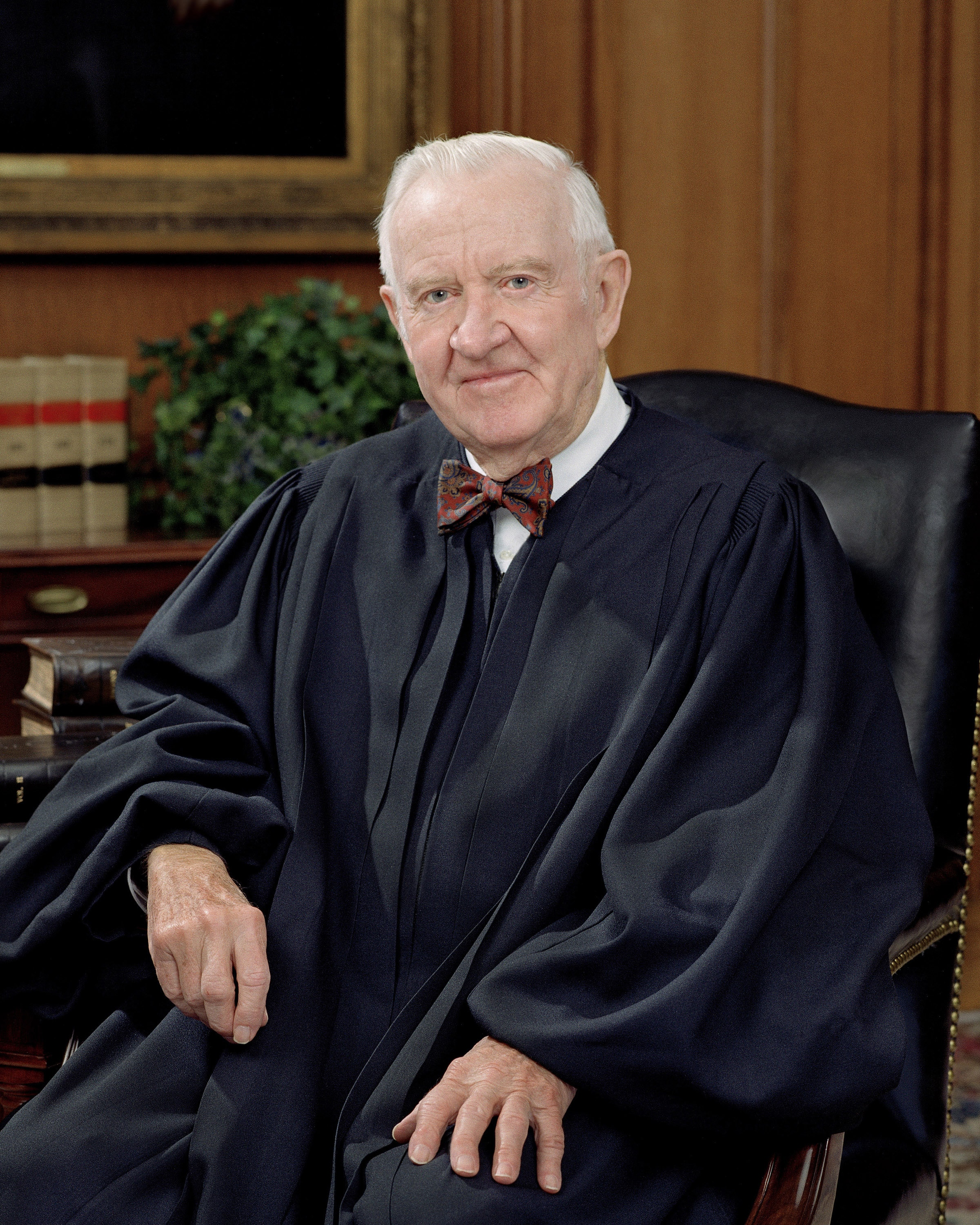

John Paul Stevens 2006 term statistics

7	Majority or plurality	8	Concurrence	3	Other
14	Dissent	2	Concurrence/dissent	Total =	34
Bench opinions = 31		Opinions relating to orders = 3		In-chambers opinions = 0
Unanimous opinions: 0		Most joined by: Ginsburg (18)		Least joined by: Thomas (2)

Type	Case	Citation	Issues	Joined by	Other opinions
	Purcell v. Gonzalez	549 U.S. 1 (2006)	Voting rights		per curiam
Stevens concurred in the Court's per curiam denial of an injunction against an Arizona state law requiring voters to provide proof of citizenship, and vacation of the lower court's decision.
	Ayers v. Belmontes	549 U.S. 7 (2006)		Souter, Ginsburg, Breyer	Kennedy; Scalia
Stevens dissented from Kennedy's 5–4 decision.
	Carey v. Musladin	549 U.S. 70 (2006)			Thomas; Kennedy; Souter
	United States v. Resendiz-Ponce	549 U.S. 102 (2007)		Roberts, Kennedy, Souter, Thomas, Ginsburg, Breyer, Alito	Scalia
Stevens' opinion for the Court held that an indictment for criminal attempt to illegally enter the United States did not need to expressly state the alleged overt act committed in furtherance of the crime.
	Gonzales v. Duenas-Alvarez	549 U.S. 183 (2007)	Deportation		Breyer
	Philip Morris USA v. Williams	549 U.S. 346 (2007)	Due process • jury determination of punitive damages		Breyer; Thomas; Ginsburg
	Marrama v. Citizens Bank of Massachusetts	549 U.S. 365 (2007)	Bankruptcy	Kennedy, Souter, Breyer, Ginsburg	Alito
	Wallace v. Kato	549 U.S. 384 (2007)		Souter	Scalia; Breyer
	Rockwell Int'l Corp. v. United States	549 U.S. 457 (2007)		Ginsburg	Scalia
	Massachusetts v. EPA	549 U.S. 497 (2007)	Standing • Clean Air Act	Kennedy, Souter, Ginsburg, Breyer	Roberts; Scalia
	Caldwell v. Quarterman	549 U.S. 970 (2006)	Anti-Terrorism and Effective Death Penalty Act		
Stevens filed a statement respecting the Court's denial of certiorari.
	Joseph v. United States	549 U.S. 1175 (2007)			
Stevens filed a statement respecting the Court's denial of certiorari, to clarify that the denial did not constitute an endorsement of an erroneous, though harmless, ruling by the lower court.
	Watters v. Wachovia Bank, N. A.	550 U.S. 1 (2007)		Roberts, Scalia	Ginsburg
	Zuni Public School District No 89 v. Dept. of Education	550 U.S. 81 (2007)			Breyer; Kennedy; Scalia; Souter
	Abdul-Kabir v. Quarterman	550 U.S. 233 (2007)		Kennedy, Souter, Ginsburg, Breyer	Roberts; Scalia
	Brewer v. Quarterman	550 U.S. 286 (2007)		Kennedy, Souter, Ginsburg, Breyer	Roberts; Scalia
	Scott v. Harris	550 U.S. 372 (2007)			Scalia; Ginsburg; Breyer
	Microsoft Corp. v. AT&T Corp.	550 U.S. 437 (2007)			Ginsburg; Alito
	Schriro v. Landrigan	550 U.S. 465 (2007)		Souter, Ginsburg, Breyer	Thomas
	Office of Senator Mark Dayton v. Hanson	550 U.S. 511 (2007)		Scalia, Kennedy, Souter, Thomas, Ginsburg, Breyer, Alito	
Roberts did not participate.
	Bell Atlantic Corp. v. Twombly	550 U.S. 544 (2007)		Ginsburg (in part)	Souter
	Los Angeles County v. Rettele	550 U.S. 609 (2007)		Ginsburg	per curiam
	Boumediene v. Bush	550 U.S. 1301 (2007)			Breyer
Stevens jointly filed with Kennedy a statement regarding the Court's denial of certiorari.
	Uttecht v. Brown	551 U.S. 1 (2007)		Souter, Ginsburg, Breyer	Kennedy; Breyer
	Safeco Insurance Co. of America v. Burr	551 U.S. 47 (2007)		Ginsburg	Souter; Thomas
	Fry v. Pliler	551 U.S. 112 (2007)		Souter, Ginsburg; Breyer (in part)	Scalia; Breyer
	Permanent Mission of India to the United Nations v. City of New York	551 U.S. 193 (2007)		Breyer	Thomas
	Credit Suisse Securities (USA) LLC v. Billing	551 U.S. 264 (2007)			Breyer; Thomas
	Tennessee Secondary School Athletic Assn. v. Brentwood Academy	551 U.S. 291 (2007)		Souter, Ginsburg, Breyer; Roberts, Scalia, Kennedy, Alito (in part)	Kennedy; Thomas
	Tellabs, Inc. v. Makor Issues & Rights, Ltd.	551 U.S. 308 (2007)			Ginsburg; Scalia; Alito
	Rita v. United States	551 U.S. 338 (2007)		Ginsburg (in part)	Breyer; Scalia; Souter
	Morse v. Frederick	551 U.S. 393 (2007)	Free speech • student rights	Souter, Ginsburg	Roberts; Thomas; Alito; Breyer
	National Assn. of Home Builders v. Defenders of Wildlife	551 U.S. 644 (2007)		Souter, Ginsburg, Breyer	Alito; Breyer
	Parents Involved in Community Schools v. Seattle Sch. Dist. No. 1	551 U.S. 701 (2007)			Roberts; Kennedy; Thomas; Breyer
