= 2006 term United States Supreme Court opinions of Antonin Scalia =

The 2006 term of the Supreme Court of the United States began October 3, 2006, and concluded September 30, 2007. This was the twenty-first term of Associate Justice Antonin Scalia's tenure on the Court.
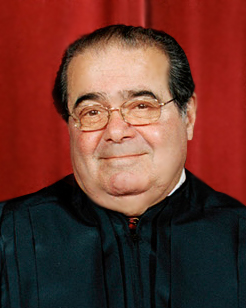

Antonin Scalia 2006 term statistics

8	Majority or plurality	6	Concurrence	1	Other
9	Dissent	1	Concurrence/dissent	Total =	25
Bench opinions = 24		Opinions relating to orders = 1		In-chambers opinions = 0
Unanimous opinions: 1		Most joined by: Thomas (17)		Least joined by: Breyer (5)

Type	Case	Citation	Issues	Joined by	Other opinions
	Ayers v. Belmontes	549 U.S. 7 (2006)	death penalty	Thomas	Kennedy; Stevens
Scalia joined the majority, and filed a short concurrence to state that he continued to believe that limits on a jury's consideration of mitigating evidence in capital sentencing did not violate the Eighth Amendment. However, because Kennedy's majority opinion conformed to Court precedent, he was content to join that opinion in full.
	United States v. Resendiz-Ponce	549 U.S. 102 (2007)			Stevens
Scalia was the sole dissenter from Stevens' 8-1 opinion, which held that an indictment for criminal attempt to illegally enter the United States did not need to expressly state the alleged overt act committed in furtherance of the attempted crime.
	MedImmune, Inc. v. Genentech, Inc.	549 U.S. 118 (2006)	Article III standing • patent law • declaratory judgments	Roberts, Stevens, Kennedy, Souter, Ginsburg, Breyer, Alito	Thomas
	Osborn v. Haley	549 U.S. 225 (2007)		Thomas	Ginsburg; Souter; Breyer
	Wallace v. Kato	549 U.S. 384 (2007)		Roberts, Kennedy, Thomas, Alito	Stevens; Breyer
	Rockwell Int'l Corp. v. United States	549 U.S. 457 (2007)		Roberts, Kennedy, Souter, Thomas, Alito	Stevens
	Massachusetts v. EPA	549 U.S. 497 (2007)	standing • Clean Air Act	Roberts, Thomas, Alito	Stevens; Roberts
	United States v. Omer	549 U.S. 1174 (2007)			
Scalia filed a statement respecting the Court's denial of certiorari, commenting on the reliance by the Solicitor General's supplemental brief on United States v. Resendiz-Ponce, 549 U.S. 102 (2007) to argue that the omission of a necessary element from an indictment of fraud was not constitutionally deficient. Scalia stated that he did not support denial on that basis, but that Resendiz-Ponce could apply "depending upon how the crime of fraud fares in our new some-crimes-are-self-defining jurisprudence. Another frontier of law opened by this Court, full of opportunity and adventure for lawyers and judges."
	Global Crossing Telecomm., Inc. v. Metrophones Telecomm., Inc.	550 U.S. 45 (2007)			Breyer; Thomas
	Zuni Public School District No 89 v. Dept. of Education	550 U.S. 81 (2007)		Roberts, Thomas; Souter (in part)	Breyer; Stevens; Kennedy; Souter
	James v. United States	550 U.S. 192 (2007)		Stevens, Ginsburg	Alito; Thomas
	Abdul-Kabir v. Quarterman	550 U.S. 223 (2007)		Thomas; Alito (in part)	Stevens; Roberts
	Brewer v. Quarterman	550 U.S. 286 (2007)		Thomas; Alito (in part)	Stevens; Roberts
	United Haulers Assn. v. Oneida-Herkimer Solid Waste Mgmt. Auth.	550 U.S. 330 (2007)			Roberts; Thomas; Alito
	Scott v. Harris	550 U.S. 372 (2007)		Roberts, Kennedy, Souter, Thomas, Ginsburg, Breyer, Alito	Ginsburg; Breyer; Stevens
	Winkelman v. Parma City School District	550 U.S. 516 (2007)		Thomas	Kennedy
	Roper v. Weaver	550 U.S. 598 (2007)		Thomas, Alito	per curiam; Roberts
	Beck v. PACE Int'l. Union	551 U.S. 96 (2007)		Unanimous	
	Fry v. Pliler	551 U.S. 112 (2007)		Roberts, Kennedy, Thomas, Alito; Stevens, Souter, Ginsburg, Breyer (in part)	Stevens; Breyer
	Davenport v. Washington Educ. Ass'n	551 U.S. 117 (2007)		Stevens, Kennedy, Souter, Thomas, Ginsburg; Roberts, Breyer, Alito (in part)	Breyer
	Powerex Corp. v. Reliant Energy Services, Inc.	551 U.S. 224 (2007)		Roberts, Kennedy, Souter, Thomas, Ginsburg, Alito	Kennedy; Breyer
	Tellabs, Inc. v. Makor Issues & Rights, Ltd.	551 U.S. 308 (2007)			Ginsburg; Alito; Stevens
	Rita v. United States	551 U.S. 338 (2007)		Thomas	Breyer; Stevens; Souter
	Federal Election Commission v. Wisconsin Right to Life	551 U.S. 449 (2007)		Kennedy, Thomas	Roberts; Alito; Souter
	Hein v. Freedom From Religion Foundation, Inc.	551 U.S. 587 (2007)			Alito; Kennedy; Souter
