= 2006 term United States Supreme Court opinions of Clarence Thomas =

The 2006 term of the Supreme Court of the United States began October 2, 2006, and concluded September 30, 2007. This was the sixteenth term of Associate Justice Clarence Thomas's tenure on the Court.
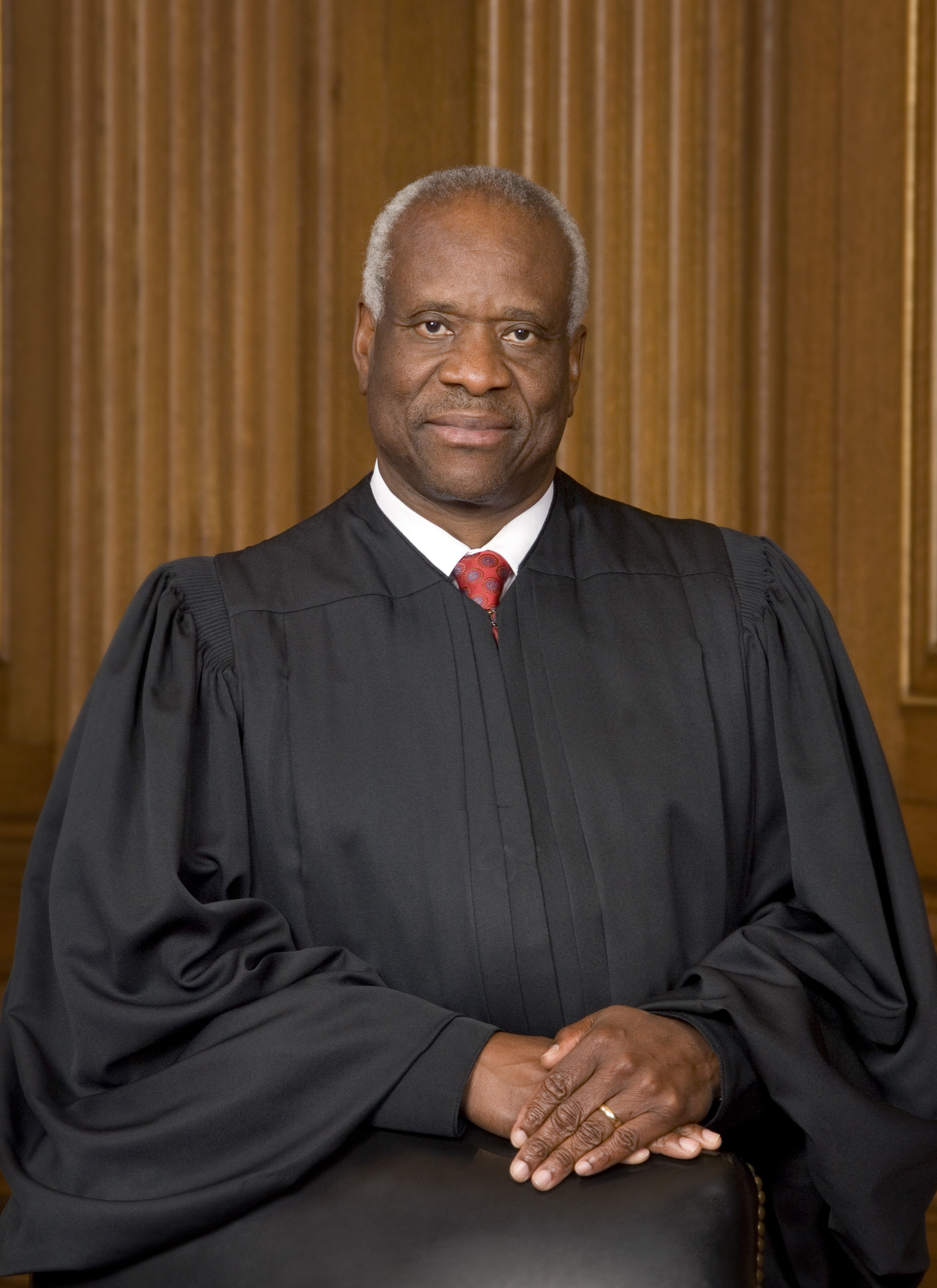

Clarence Thomas 2006 term statistics

8	Majority or plurality	8	Concurrence	0	Other
8	Dissent	0	Concurrence/dissent	Total =	24
Bench opinions = 24		Opinions relating to orders = 0		In-chambers opinions = 0
Unanimous opinions: 2		Most joined by: Scalia (11)		Least joined by: Stevens (3)

Type	Case	Citation	Issues	Joined by	Other opinions
	Lopez v. Gonzalez	549 U.S. 47 (2006)	Deportation		Souter
	Carey v. Musladin	549 U.S. 70 (2006)		Roberts, Scalia, Ginsburg, Breyer, Alito	Stevens; Kennedy; Souter
	MedImmune, Inc. v. Genentech, Inc.	549 U.S. 118 (2007)	Article III standing • patent law • declaratory judgments		Scalia
	Weyerhaeuser Co. v. Ross-Simmons Hardwood Lumber Co.	549 U.S. 312 (2007)		Unanimous	
	Lawrence v. Florida	549 U.S. 327 (2007)		Roberts, Scalia, Kennedy, Alito	Ginsburg
	Philip Morris USA v. Williams	549 U.S. 346 (2007)			Breyer; Stevens; Ginsburg
	Limtiaco v. Camacho	549 U.S. 483 (2007)		Roberts, Scalia, Kennedy, Breyer; Stevens, Souter, Ginsburg, Alito (in part)	Souter
	Environmental Defense v. Duke Energy Corp.	549 U.S. 561 (2007)			Souter
	Global Crossing Telecomm., Inc. v. Metrophones Telecomm., Inc.	550 U.S. 45 (2007)			Breyer; Scalia
	Gonzales v. Carhart	550 U.S. 124 (2007)	abortion	Scalia	Kennedy; Ginsburg
	James v. United States	550 U.S. 192 (2007)			Alito; Scalia
	United Haulers Assn. v. Oneida-Herkimer Solid Waste Mgmt. Auth.	550 U.S. 330 (2007)			Roberts; Scalia; Alito
	Schriro v. Landrigan	550 U.S. 465 (2007)		Roberts, Scalia, Kennedy, Alito	Stevens
	Safeco Insurance Co. of America v. Burr	551 U.S. 47 (2007)		Alito	Souter; Stevens
	Erickson v. Pardus	551 U.S. 89 (2007)			per curiam
	United States v. Atlantic Research Corp.	551 U.S. 128 (2007)		Unanimous	
	Permanent Mission of India to the United Nations v. City of New York	551 U.S. 193 (2007)		Roberts, Scalia, Kennedy, Souter, Ginsburg, Alito	Stevens
	Bowles v. Russell	551 U.S. 205 (2007)		Roberts, Scalia, Kennedy, Alito	Souter
	Credit Suisse Securities (USA) LLC v. Billing	551 U.S. 264 (2007)			Breyer; Stevens
	Tennessee Secondary School Athletic Assn. v. Brentwood Academy	551 U.S. 291 (2007)			Stevens; Kennedy
	Morse v. Frederick	551 U.S. 393 (2007)			Roberts; Alito; Breyer; Stevens
	Wilkie v. Robbins	551 U.S. 537 (2007)		Scalia	Souter; Ginsburg
	Parents Involved in Community Schools v. Seattle School District No. 1	551 U.S. 701 (2007)			Roberts; Kennedy; Stevens; Breyer
	Panetti v. Quarterman	551 U.S. 930 (2007)		Roberts, Scalia, Alito	Kennedy
