= 2006 term United States Supreme Court opinions of Stephen Breyer =

The 2006 term of the Supreme Court of the United States began October 2, 2006, and concluded September 30, 2007. This was the thirteenth term of Associate Justice Stephen Breyer's tenure on the Court.
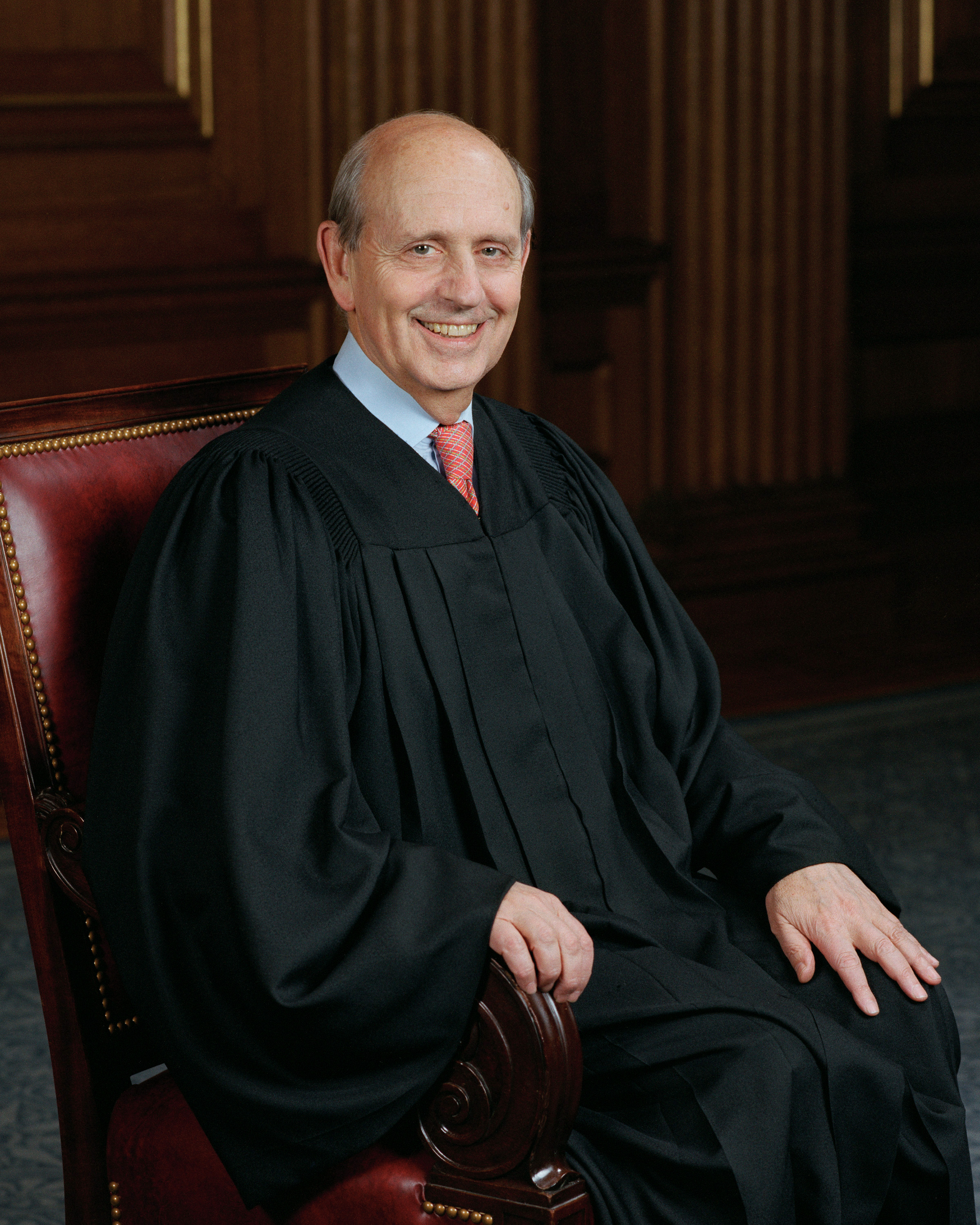

Stephen Breyer 2006 term statistics

8	Majority or plurality	2	Concurrence	0	Other
7	Dissent	3	Concurrence/dissent	Total =	20
Bench opinions = 19		Opinions relating to orders = 1		In-chambers opinions = 0
Unanimous opinions: 2		Most joined by: Ginsburg (11)		Least joined by: Thomas (4)

Type	Case	Citation	Issues	Joined by	Other opinions
	Gonzales v. Duenas-Alvarez	549 U.S. 183 (2007)	deportation	Roberts, Scalia, Kennedy, Souter, Thomas, Ginsburg, Alito; Stevens (in part)	Stevens
Breyer wrote for the Court in ruling that aiding and abetting theft qualified as a deportable theft offense.
	Osborn v.Haley	549 U.S. 225 (2007)			Ginsburg; Souter; Scalia
	Philip Morris USA v. Williams	549 U.S. 346 (2007)		Roberts, Kennedy, Souter, Alito	Stevens; Thomas; Ginsburg
	Wallace v. Kato	549 U.S. 384 (2007)		Ginsburg	Scalia; Stevens
	Global Crossing Telecomm., Inc. v. Metrophones Telecomm., Inc.	550 U.S. 45 (2007)		Roberts, Stevens, Kennedy, Souter, Ginsburg, Alito	Scalia; Thomas
	Zuni Public School District No 89 v. Dept. of Education	550 U.S. 81 (2007)		Stevens, Kennedy, Ginsburg, Alito	Stevens; Kennedy; Scalia; Souter
	Scott v. Harris	550 U.S. 372 (2007)			Scalia; Ginsburg; Stevens
	Boumediene v. Bush	550 U.S. 1301 (2007)		Souter; Ginsburg (in part)	Stevens and Kennedy
Breyer dissented from the Court's denial of certiorari.
	Uttecht v. Brown	551 U.S. 1 (2007)		Souter	Kennedy; Stevens
	Fry v. Pliler	551 U.S. 112 (2007)			Scalia; Stevens
	Watson v. Philip Morris Cos.	551 U.S. 142 (2007)		Unanimous	
	Long Island Care at Home, Ltd. v. Coke	551 U.S. 158 (2007)		Unanimous	
	Davenport v. Washington Ed. Assn.	551 U.S. 177 (2007)		Roberts, Alito	Scalia
	Powerex Corp. v. Reliant Energy Services, Inc.	551 U.S. 224 (2007)		Stevens	Scalia; Kennedy
	Credit Suisse Securities (USA) LLC v. Billing	551 U.S. 264 (2007)		Roberts, Scalia, Souter, Ginsburg, Alito	Stevens; Thomas
	Rita v. United States	551 U.S. 338 (2007)		Roberts, Stevens, Kennedy, Thomas, Ginsburg, Alito; Scalia (in part)	Stevens; Scalia
	Morse v. Frederick	551 U.S. 393 (2007)	free speech • student rights		Roberts; Thomas; Alito; Stevens
	National Assn. of Home Builders v. Defenders of Wildlife	551 U.S. 644 (2007)			Alito; Stevens
	Parents Involved in Community Schools v. Seattle School District No. 1	551 U.S. 701 (2007)		Stevens, Souter, Ginsburg	Roberts; Kennedy; Thomas; Stevens
	Leegin Creative Leather Products, Inc. v. PSKS, Inc.	551 U.S. 877 (2007)		Stevens, Souter, Ginsburg	Kennedy
