= 2006 term United States Supreme Court opinions of Anthony Kennedy =

The 2006 term of the Supreme Court of the United States began October 2, 2006, and concluded September 30, 2007. This was the twentieth term of Associate Justice Anthony Kennedy's tenure on the Court.
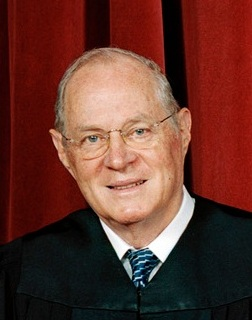

Anthony Kennedy 2006 term statistics

| 8 | Majority or plurality | 6 | Concurrence | 1 | Other |
| 1 | Dissent | 0 | Concurrence/dissent | Total = | 16 |
| Bench opinions = 15 | | Opinions relating to orders = 1 | | In-chambers opinions = 0 |
| Unanimous opinions: 1 | | Most joined by: Alito (9) | | Least joined by: Stevens, Souter, Ginsburg (4) |

| Type | Case | Citation | Issues | Joined by | Other opinions |
|---|---|---|---|---|---|
| | Ayers v. Belmontes | 549 U.S. 7 (2006) | death penalty | Roberts, Scalia, Thomas, Alito | Scalia; Stevens |
| | Carey v. Musladin | 549 U.S. 70 (2006) | | | Thomas; Stevens; Souter |
| | Cunningham v. California | 549 U.S. 270 (2007) | | Breyer | Ginsburg; Alito |
| | Zuni Public School District No 89 v. Dept. of Education | 550 U.S. 81 (2007) | | Alito | Breyer; Stevens; Scalia; Souter |
| | Gonzales v. Carhart | 550 U.S. 124 (2007) | abortion | Roberts, Scalia, Thomas, Alito | Thomas; Ginsburg |
| | Smith v. Texas | 550 U.S. 297 (2007) | | Stevens, Souter, Ginsburg, Breyer | Souter; Alito |
| | KSR Int'l Co. v. Teleflex Inc. | 550 U.S. 398 (2007) | patent law | Unanimous | |
| | Winkelman v. Parma City School District | 550 U.S. 516 (2007) | | Roberts, Stevens, Souter, Ginsburg, Breyer, Alito | Scalia |
| | Boumediene v. Bush | 550 U.S. 1301 (2007) | | | Breyer |
Kennedy jointly filed with Stevens a statement regarding the Court's denial of certiorari.
| | Uttecht v. Brown | 551 U.S. 1 (2007) | | Roberts, Scalia, Thomas, Alito | Stevens; Breyer |
| | Powerex Corp. v. Reliant Energy Services, Inc. | 551 U.S. 224 (2007) | | Alito | Scalia; Breyer |
| | Tennessee Secondary School Athletic Assn. v. Brentwood Academy | 551 U.S. 291 (2007) | | Roberts, Scalia, Alito | Stevens; Thomas |
| | Hein v. Freedom From Religion Foundation, Inc. | 551 U.S. 587 (2007) | Establishment Clause • taxpayer standing | | Alito; Scalia; Souter |
| | Parents Involved in Community Schools v. Seattle Sch. Dist. No. 1 | 551 U.S. 701 (2007) | | | Roberts; Thomas; Stevens; Breyer |
| | Leegin Creative Leather Products, Inc. v. PSKS, Inc. | 551 U.S. 877 (2007) | antitrust | Roberts, Scalia, Thomas, Alito | Breyer |
| | Panetti v. Quarterman | 551 U.S. 930 (2007) | | Stevens, Souter, Ginsburg, Breyer | Thomas |
