= 2006 term United States Supreme Court opinions of David Souter =

The 2006 term of the Supreme Court of the United States began October 2, 2006, and concluded September 30, 2007. This was the seventeenth term of Associate Justice David Souter's tenure on the Court.
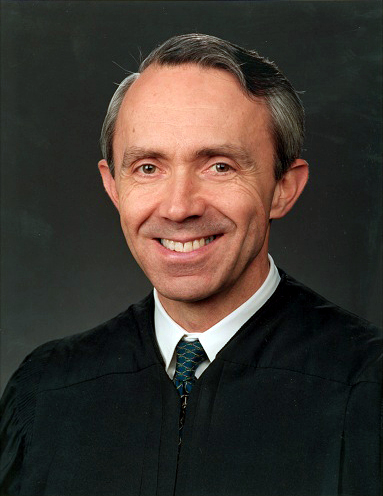

David Souter 2006 term statistics

7	Majority or plurality	3	Concurrence	0	Other
5	Dissent	2	Concurrence/dissent	Total =	17
Bench opinions = 17		Opinions relating to orders = 0		In-chambers opinions = 0
Unanimous opinions: 2		Most joined by: Stevens, Ginsburg, Breyer (10)		Least joined by: Thomas (6)

Type	Case	Citation	Issues	Joined by	Other opinions
	Lopez v. Gonzalez	549 U.S. 47 (2006)	deportation	Roberts, Stevens, Scalia, Kennedy, Ginsburg, Breyer, Alito	Thomas
	Carey v. Musladin	549 U.S. 70 (2006)			Thomas; Stevens; Kennedy
	Norfolk Southern R. Co. v. Sorrell	549 U.S. 158 (2007)		Scalia, Alito	Roberts; Ginsburg
	Osborn v. Haley	549 U.S. 225 (2007)			Ginsburg; Breyer; Scalia
	Limtiaco v. Camacho	549 U.S. 483 (2007)		Stevens, Ginsburg, Alito	Thomas
	Environmental Defense v. Duke Energy Corp.	549 U.S. 561 (2007)		Roberts, Stevens, Scalia, Kennedy, Ginsburg, Breyer, Alito; Thomas (in part)	Thomas
	Zuni Public School District No 89 v. Dept. of Education	550 U.S. 81 (2007)			Breyer; Stevens; Kennedy; Scalia
	Smith v. Texas	549 U.S. 297 (2007)			Kennedy; Alito
	EC Term of Years Trust v. United States	550 U.S. 429 (2007)		Unanimous	
	Bell Atlantic Corp. v. Twombly	550 U.S. 544 (2007)		Roberts, Scalia, Kennedy, Thomas, Breyer, Alito	Stevens
	Safeco Insurance Co. of America v. Burr	551 U.S. 47 (2007)		Roberts, Kennedy, Breyer; Stevens, Scalia, Thomas, Ginsburg, Alito (in part)	Stevens; Thomas
	Bowles v. Russell	551 U.S. 205 (2007)		Stevens, Ginsburg, Breyer	Thomas
	Brendlin v. California	551 U.S. 249 (2007)	Fourth Amendment	Unanimous	
	Rita v. United States	551 U.S. 338 (2007)			Breyer; Stevens; Scalia
	Federal Election Commission v. Wisconsin Right to Life	551 U.S. 449 (2007)		Stevens, Ginsburg, Breyer	Roberts; Scalia; Alito
	Wilkie v. Robbins	551 U.S. 537 (2007)		Roberts, Scalia, Kennedy, Thomas, Breyer, Alito; Stevens, Ginsburg (in part)	Thomas; Ginsburg
	Hein v. Freedom From Religion Foundation, Inc.	551 U.S. 587 (2007)		Stevens, Ginsburg, Breyer	Alito; Scalia; Kennedy; Souter
