= 2006 term United States Supreme Court opinions of Ruth Bader Ginsburg =

The 2006 term of the Supreme Court of the United States began October 2, 2006, and concluded September 30, 2007. This was the fourteenth term of Associate Justice Ruth Bader Ginsburg's tenure on the Court.
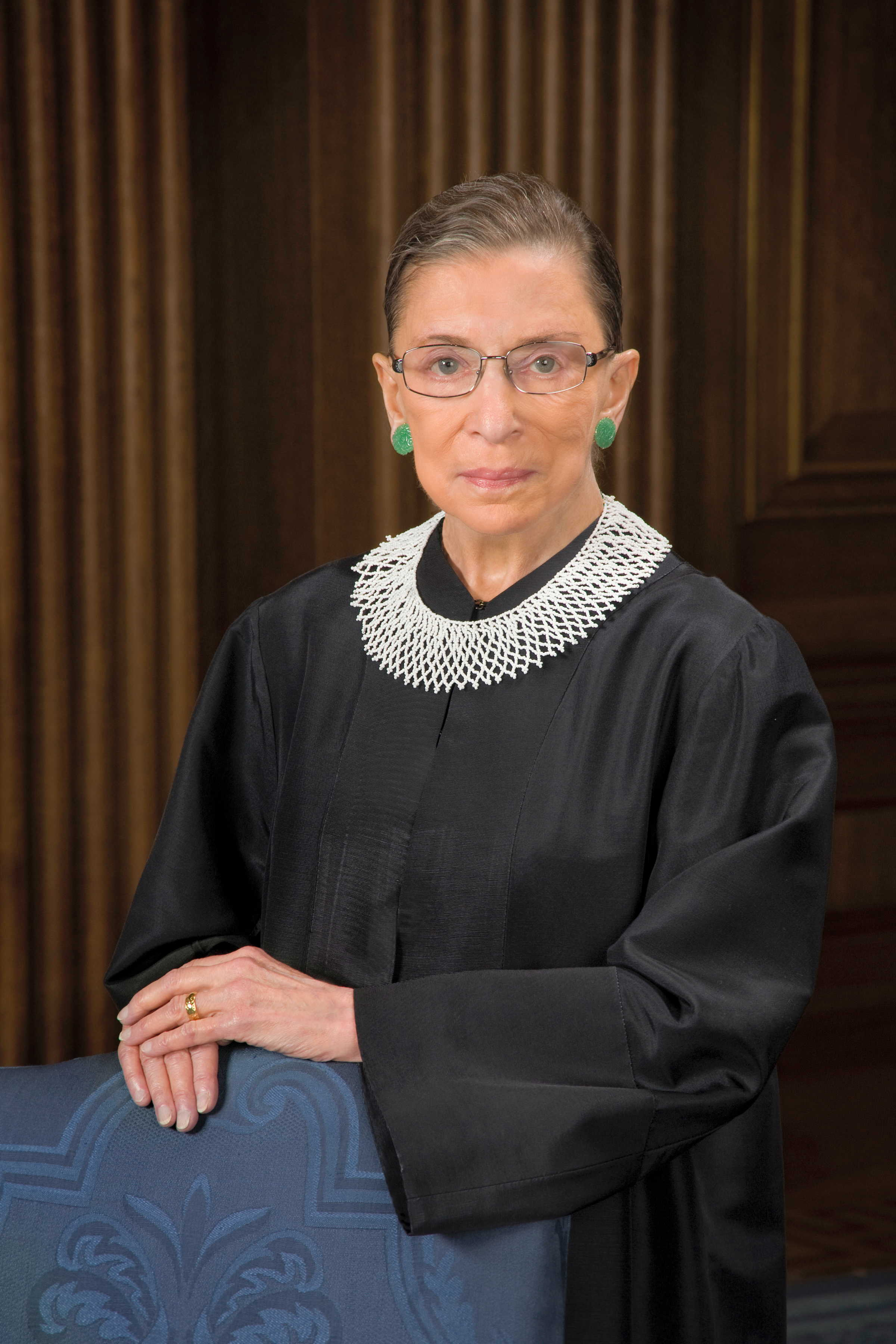

Ruth Bader Ginsburg 2006 term statistics

7	Majority or plurality	3	Concurrence	0	Other
4	Dissent	1	Concurrence/dissent	Total =	15
Bench opinions = 14		Opinions relating to orders = 1		In-chambers opinions = 0
Unanimous opinions: 2		Most joined by: Souter (10)		Least joined by: Alito (3)

Type	Case	Citation	Issues	Joined by	Other opinions
	Norfolk Southern R. Co. v. Sorrell	549 U.S. 158 (2007)			Roberts; Souter
	Osborn v. Haley	549 U.S. 225 (2007)		Roberts, Stevens, Kennedy, Alito; Souter, Breyer (in part)	Souter; Breyer; Scalia
	Cunningham v. California	549 U.S. 270 (2007)	sentencing • Sixth Amendment	Roberts, Stevens, Scalia, Souter, Thomas	Kennedy; Alito
	Lawrence v. Florida	549 U.S. 327 (2007)		Stevens, Souter, Breyer	Thomas
	Philip Morris USA v. Williams	549 U.S. 346 (2007)	punitive damages • Due Process • Fourteenth Amendment	Scalia, Thomas	Breyer; Stevens; Thomas
	Sinochem Int'l Co. v. Malaysia Int'l Shipping Corp.	549 U.S. 422 (2007)		Unanimous	
	Haas v. Quest Recovery Services, Inc.	549 U.S. 1163 (2007)			
Ginsburg concurred in the Court’s order granting certiorari, vacating the Sixth Circuit's judgment, and remanding for consideration of the views of the United States in light of 28 U.S.C. §2403(a).
	Watters v. Wachovia Bank, N. A.	550 U.S. 1 (2007)		Kennedy, Souter, Breyer, Alito	Stevens
	Gonzales v. Carhart	550 U.S. 124 (2007)	abortion	Stevens, Souter, Breyer	Kennedy; Thomas
	Scott v. Harris	550 U.S. 372 (2007)			Scalia; Breyer; Stevens
	Microsoft Corp. v. AT&T Corp.	550 U.S. 437 (2007)		Scalia, Kennedy, Souter	Alito; Stevens
	Ledbetter v. Goodyear Tire & Rubber Co.	550 U.S. 618 (2007)		Stevens, Souter, Breyer	Alito
	Sole v. Wyner	551 U.S. 74 (2007)		Unanimous	
	Tellabs, Inc. v. Makor Issues & Rights, Ltd.	551 U.S. 308 (2007)		Roberts, Kennedy, Souter, Thomas, Breyer	Scalia; Alito; Stevens
	Wilkie v. Robbins	551 U.S. 537 (2007)		Stevens	Souter; Thomas
