= 2006 term United States Supreme Court opinions of Samuel Alito =

The 2006 term of the Supreme Court of the United States began October 2, 2006, and concluded September 30, 2007. This was the second term of Associate Justice Samuel Alito's tenure on the Court.
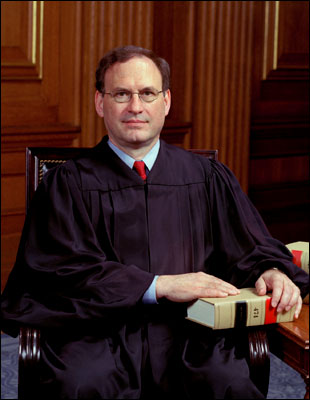

Samuel Alito 2006 term statistics

7	Majority or plurality	4	Concurrence	0	Other
4	Dissent	0	Concurrence/dissent	Total =	15
Bench opinions = 15		Opinions relating to orders = 0		In-chambers opinions = 0
Unanimous opinions: 2		Most joined by: Kennedy (10)		Least joined by: Ginsburg (3)

Type	Case	Citation	Issues	Joined by	Other opinions
	BP America Production Co. v. Burton	549 U.S. 84 (2006)		Stevens, Scalia, Kennedy, Souter, Thomas, Ginsburg	
Roberts and Breyer did not participate.
	Cunningham v. California	549 U.S. 270 (2007)		Kennedy, Breyer	Ginsburg; Kennedy
	Marrama v. Citizens Bank of Massachusetts	549 U.S. 365 (2007)	Bankruptcy	Roberts, Scalia, Thomas	Stevens
	Whorton v. Bockting	549 U.S. 406 (2007)		Unanimous	
	Travelers Casualty & Surety Co. of America v. Pacific Gas & Elec. Co.	549 U.S. 443 (2007)	Bankruptcy	Unanimous	
	James v. United States	550 U.S. 192 (2007)		Roberts, Kennedy, Souter, Breyer	Scalia; Thomas
	Smith v. Texas	550 U.S. 297 (2007)		Roberts, Scalia, Thomas	Kennedy; Souter
	United Haulers Assn. v. Oneida-Herkimer Solid Waste Mgmt. Auth.	550 U.S. 330 (2007)		Stevens, Kennedy	Roberts; Scalia; Thomas
	Microsoft Corp. v. AT&T Corp.	550 U.S. 437 (2007)		Thomas, Breyer	Ginsburg; Stevens
	Ledbetter v. Goodyear Tire & Rubber Co.	550 U.S. 618 (2007)		Roberts, Scalia, Kennedy, Thomas	Ginsburg
	Tellabs, Inc. v. Makor Issues & Rights, Ltd.	551 U.S. 308 (2007)			Ginsburg; Scalia; Stevens
	Morse v. Frederick	551 U.S. 393 (2007)		Kennedy	Roberts; Thomas; Breyer; Stevens
	Federal Election Commission v. Wisconsin Right to Life	551 U.S. 449 (2007)			Roberts; Scalia; Souter
	Hein v. Freedom From Religion Foundation, Inc.	551 U.S. 587 (2007)		Roberts, Kennedy	Scalia; Kennedy; Souter
	National Assn. of Home Builders v. Defenders of Wildlife	551 U.S. 644 (2007)		Roberts, Scalia, Kennedy, Thomas	Stevens; Breyer
