= 2006 term United States Supreme Court opinions of John Roberts =

The 2006 term of the Supreme Court of the United States began October 2, 2006, and concluded September 30, 2007. This was the second term of Chief Justice John Roberts's tenure on the Court.
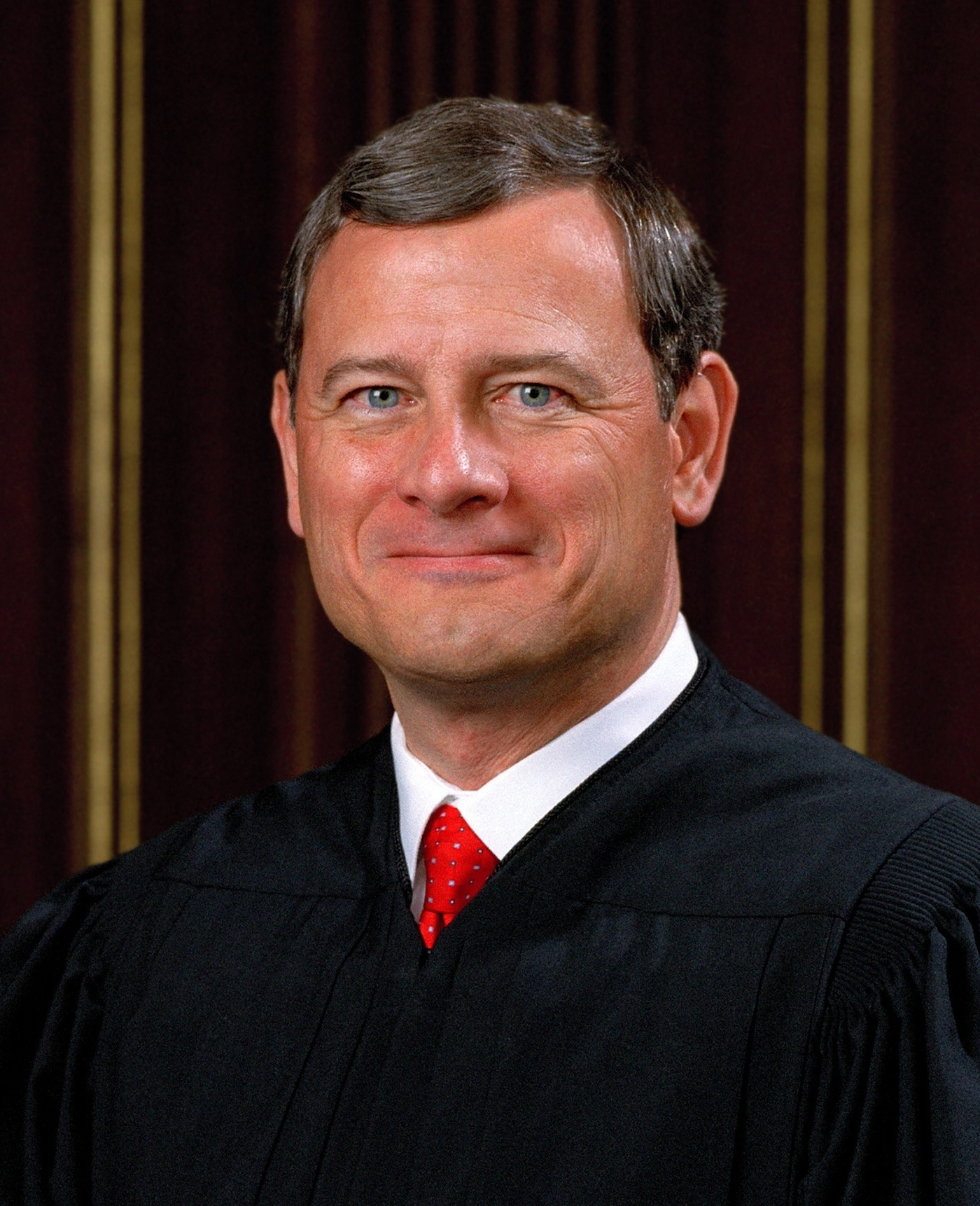

John Roberts 2006 term statistics

7	Majority or plurality	1	Concurrence	2	Other
3	Dissent	0	Concurrence/dissent	Total =	13
Bench opinions = 11		Opinions relating to orders = 0		In-chambers opinions = 2
Unanimous opinions: 2		Most joined by: Scalia, Thomas, Alito (9)		Least joined by: Stevens, Ginsburg (3)

Type	Case	Citation	Issues	Joined by	Other opinions
	Norfolk Southern R. Co. v. Sorrell	549 U.S. 158 (2007)	Federal Employers' Liability Act	Stevens, Scalia, Kennedy, Souter, Thomas, Breyer, Alito	Souter; Ginsburg
	Jones v. Bock	549 U.S. 199 (2007)		Unanimous	
	Massachusetts v. EPA	549 U.S. 497 (2007)	Clean Air Act • standing	Scalia, Thomas, Alito	Stevens; Scalia
	Stroup v. Willcox	549 U.S. 1501 (2006)			
Roberts denied the application for a stay.
	Abdul-Kabir v. Quarterman	550 U.S. 233 (2007)		Scalia, Thomas, Alito	Stevens; Scalia
	Brewer v. Quarterman	550 U.S. 286 (2007)		Scalia, Thomas, Alito	Stevens; Scalia
	United Haulers Assn. v. Oneida-Herkimer Solid Waste Mgmt. Auth.	550 U.S. 330 (2007)		Souter, Ginsburg, Breyer	Scalia; Thomas; Alito
	Hinck v. United States	550 U.S. 501 (2007)		Unanimous	
	Roper v. Weaver	550 U.S. 598 (2007)	Antiterrorism and Effective Death Penalty Act		per curiam; Scalia
Roberts concurred in the Court's dismissal of certiorari, stating that he did not agree with all of the reasons given in the Court's per curiam opinion, but that he agreed with the disposition.
	Boumediene v. Bush	550 U.S. 1301 (2007)			
Roberts denied the applications for extension of time to petition for rehearing the Court's denial of certiorari, and for suspension of the order denying cert.
	Morse v. Frederick	551 U.S. 393 (2007)	First Amendment • free speech • student rights	Scalia, Kennedy, Thomas Alito	Thomas; Alito; Breyer; Stevens
Roberts wrote for a 5–4 majority in holding that a public school principal may, consistent with the First Amendment, restrict student speech at a school event when that speech is reasonably viewed as promoting illegal drug use.
	Federal Election Commission v. Wisconsin Right to Life, Inc.	551 U.S. 449 (2007)	Campaign finance reform	Alito; Scalia, Kennedy, Thomas (in part)	Scalia; Alito; Souter
	Parents Involved in Community Schools v. Seattle Sch. Dist. No. 1	551 U.S. 701 (2007)		Scalia, Thomas, Alito; Kennedy (in part)	Kennedy; Thomas; Stevens; Breyer
