= Powerex =

Powerex may refer to:

- Powerex (electricity), a Canadian electricity wholesaler
- Powerex (semiconductors), an American semiconductor company

== See also ==
- Powerex Corp. v. Reliant Energy Services Inc.
