= Smith v. Texas =

Smith v. Texas may refer to:

== United States Supreme Court decisions ==
- Smith v. Texas, 233 U.S. 630 (1914), which held in an 8–1 opinion by Justice Joseph Rucker Lamar that a Texas statute, which prohibited anyone from serving as a train conductor who had not already served for two years as conductor or brakeman, violated the Fourteenth Amendment.
- Smith v. Texas, 311 U.S. 128 (1940), which held in a unanimous opinion by Justice Hugo Black that the Fourteenth Amendment prohibited racial discrimination in the selection of grand juries.
- Smith v. Texas, 543 U.S. 37 (2004) (Smith I), a per curiam decision that held a capital jury was unconstitutionally restricted from considering a defendant's mitigation evidence at sentencing.
- Smith v. Texas, 550 U.S. 297 (2007) (Smith II), a 5–4 decision authored by Justice Anthony Kennedy and holding that the state court, on remand from Smith I, 543 U.S. 37 (2004), had incorrectly ruled that the defendant had not preserved on appeal the constitutional errors identified in that previous decision.
