= Powerex (semiconductors) =

Pennsylvania-based company specializing in high power semiconductor applications

Powerex Inc., is a Pennsylvania-based company specializing in high power semiconductor applications. Powerex supports many markets, including transportation, AC and DC motor controls, UPS, alternative energy, medical power supplies, welding, industrial heating, electrical vehicles, aircraft, and communications.

Established on January 1, 1986 (40 years ago), Powerex inc. was the result of cooperation between two major players in the power semiconductor industry – the Power Semiconductor Divisions of General Electric Company and Westinghouse Electric Corporation. Mitsubishi Electric Corporation later established an equity position in Powerex. In 1994, Westinghouse sold its shares to General Electric and Mitsubishi Electric, the present equal majority shareholders. Corporate offices and manufacturing facilities are located in western Pennsylvania.

Powerex offers a broad line of products, including IGBTs, MOSFETs, thyristors, rectifiers, diodes, fast recovery diodes, DC-DC converters, and assemblies.
