= Permanent Mission of India v. City of New York =

Permanent Mission of India to the United Nations v. City of New York
- Supreme Court of the United States

Argued April 24, 2007 Decided June 14, 2007
- Full case name: The Permanent Mission of India to the United Nations et al. v. City of New York
- Docket no.: 06-134
- Citations: 551 U.S. 193 (more) 127 S. Ct. 2352; 168 L. Ed. 2d 85

Case history
- Prior: Ruling in favor of the City upheld by the Second Circuit, 446 F.3d 365 (2d Cir. 2006); cert. granted, 549 U.S. ___ (2007)

Holding
- The Foreign Sovereign Immunities Act does not preclude federal courts from hearing suits brought to enforce tax liens.

Court membership
- Chief Justice John Roberts Associate Justices John P. Stevens · Antonin Scalia; Anthony Kennedy · David Souter; Clarence Thomas · Ruth Bader Ginsburg; Stephen Breyer · Samuel Alito

Case opinions
- Majority: Thomas, joined by Roberts, Scalia, Kennedy, Souter, Ginsburg, Alito
- Dissent: Stevens, joined by Breyer

Laws applied
- 28 U.S.C. § 1602

Permanent Mission of India v. City of New York, 551 U.S. 193 (2007), was a United States Supreme Court case in which the Court construed the Foreign Sovereign Immunities Act to allow a federal court to hear a lawsuit brought by the City of New York to recover unpaid property taxes levied against India and Mongolia, both of which own real estate in New York.

== Background ==
India and Mongolia owned buildings in Manhattan. They used part of their buildings for diplomatic business, and another part to house lower-level diplomatic staff, who did not pay rent.

Under New York law, real property owned by foreign governments was exempt from taxation if it was "used exclusively" for diplomatic offices or for the quartering of diplomats "with the rank of ambassador or minister plenipotentiary" to the United Nations. If the foreign government only used part of its property for these purposes, then the remainder of the property was subject to taxation.

The City of New York had levied taxes against India and Mongolia for the appropriate portions of their buildings, but India and Mongolia refused to pay. Eventually the unpaid taxes became tax liens. As of February 1, 2003, India's lien amounted to $16.4 million, and Mongolia's amounted to $2.1 million.

The City brought suit in state court to enforce the liens, and India and Mongolia removed the suit to federal court. Once in federal court, India and Mongolia argued they were immune to suit under the Foreign Sovereign Immunities Act (FSIA). The district court disagreed, reasoning that the FSIA did not exempt foreign governments from suits in which "rights in immovable property situated in the United States are in issue." The Second Circuit agreed with the district court, adding that the tax obligations owed by India and Mongolia qualified as "rights in immovable property." India and Mongolia asked the Supreme Court to review the case, and it agreed to do so.

== Majority opinion ==
Under the FSIA, a foreign government is presumptively immune from suit in federal court unless a specific exception applies. This case involves the exception for "rights in immovable property situated in the United States." The question before the Supreme Court was whether a suit declaring the validity of a tax lien places "rights in immovable property" in issue.

A "lien" is a "charge or security or incumbrance upon property." An "incumbrance," in turn, is any "right to, or interest in, land which may subsist in another to the diminution of its value." A tax lien "inhibits one of the quintessential rights of property ownership—the right to convey that property. Thus, a suit to declare the validity of a tax lien inquestionably places "rights in immovable property" in issue.

This interpretation is consistent with the prevailing view of international law in 1976, the year FSIA was enacted. Under international law, sovereign immunity exists for inherently public acts but not with respect to private acts. Property ownership was held to not be an inherently public function.

== Dissenting opinion ==
Justice John Paul Stevens (with whom Justice Stephen Breyer joined) argued that none of the exceptions to sovereign immunity under the FSIA applied to suits to enforce tax liens. Because tax liens are available to force payment in a variety of situations, such as pest control, litter removal, and emergency repairs, a "whole host of routine civil controversies could be converted into property liens and then used—as the tax lien was in this case—to pierce a foreign sovereign's traditional and statutory immunity." In this way, the tax-lien exception could swallow the rule, imposing upon those foreign governments the duty to defend against these lawsuits.

== See also ==
- List of United States Supreme Court cases, volume 551
- List of United States Supreme Court cases
