= Bowles v. Russell =

- Supreme Court of the United States

Argued March 26, 2007 Decided June 14, 2007
- Full case name: Keith Bowles, Petitioner v. Harry Russell, Warden
- Docket no.: 06-5306
- Citations: 551 U.S. 205 (more) 127 S. Ct. 2360; 168 L. Ed. 2d 96

Case history
- Prior: 432 F.3d 668 (6th Cir. 2005)

Holding
- Federal Courts of Appeals lack jurisdiction to hear habeas appeals that are filed late, even if the district court said the petitioner had additional time to file.

Court membership
- Chief Justice John Roberts Associate Justices John P. Stevens · Antonin Scalia; Anthony Kennedy · David Souter; Clarence Thomas · Ruth Bader Ginsburg; Stephen Breyer · Samuel Alito

Case opinions
- Majority: Thomas, joined by Roberts, Scalia, Kennedy, Alito
- Dissent: Souter, joined by Stevens, Ginsburg, Breyer
- This case overturned a previous ruling or rulings
- Harris Truck Lines, Inc. v. Cherry Meat Packers, Inc. (1962); Thompson v. Immigration and Naturalization Service (1964)

Bowles v. Russell, 551 U.S. 205 (2007), is a Supreme Court of the United States case in which the Court determined that the federal courts of appeals lack jurisdiction to hear habeas appeals that are filed late, even if the district court said the petitioner had additional time to file.

== Background ==
In 1999, Keith Bowles was convicted in the murder of Ollie Gipson. Bowles requested to file an appeal under Federal Rule of Appellate Procedure 4(a)(6), which allows a district court to grant a 14-day extension under certain conditions. The District Court granted Bowles' motion but inexplicably gave him 17 days to file his notice of appeal. He filed within the 17 days allowed by the District Court, but after the 14-day period allowed by Rule 4(a)(6) and §2107(c). In an opinion written by Chief Judge Danny Julian Boggs, the Sixth Circuit Court of Appeals held that the notice was untimely and that they therefore lacked jurisdiction to hear the case.

== Decision ==
In this case, a District Court purported to extend a party's time for filing an appeal beyond the period allowed by statute. We must decide whether the Court of Appeals had jurisdiction to entertain an appeal filed after the statutory period but within the period allowed by the District Court's order. We have long and repeatedly held that the time limits for filing a notice of appeal are jurisdictional in nature. Accordingly, we hold that petitioner's untimely notice—even though filed in reliance upon a District Court's order—deprived the Court of Appeals jurisdiction.

The dissenting opinion stated "It is intolerable for the judicial system to treat people this way, and there is not even a technical justification for condoning this bait and switch."

== Impact ==
The Court ruled that an appellate court may sua sponte (on its own motion) dismiss an appeal which has not been filed within the time limitations authorized by statute, even if the district court told the appellant that he had additional time and the appellant relied on the court's guidance. Rule 4(a)(6) of the Federal Rules of Appellate Procedure was interpreted that time is of the essence. Additional time granted by the district court judge is not permitted if beyond the stated rules. The ruling may be seen as the Court's attempt to limit the powers of the judicial branch, especially in regard to appeals from criminal convictions.

== See also ==
- List of United States Supreme Court cases, volume 551
- Caterpillar Inc. v. Lewis (1996)
- List of United States Supreme Court cases
