= Ayers v. Belmontes =

- Supreme Court of the United States

Decided November 13, 2006
- Full case name: Ayers v. Belmontes
- Citations: 549 U.S. 7 (more)

Holding
- A catch-all jury instruction allowing consideration of "any other circumstance which extenuates the gravity of the crime even though it is not a legal excuse for the crime" permits the jury to consider a defendant's post-crime evidence and is consistent with the constitutional right to present mitigating evidence in death-penalty sentencing.

Court membership
- Chief Justice John Roberts Associate Justices John P. Stevens · Antonin Scalia; Anthony Kennedy · David Souter; Clarence Thomas · Ruth Bader Ginsburg; Stephen Breyer · Samuel Alito

Case opinions
- Majority: Kennedy, joined by Roberts, Scalia, Thomas, Alito
- Concurrence: Scalia, joined by Thomas
- Dissent: Stevens, joined by Souter, Ginsburg, Breyer

Ayers v. Belmontes, 549 U.S. 7 (2006), was a United States Supreme Court case in which the court held that a catch-all jury instruction allowing consideration of "any other circumstance which extenuates the gravity of the crime even though it is not a legal excuse for the crime" permits the jury to consider a defendant's post-crime evidence and is consistent with the constitutional right to present mitigating evidence in death-penalty sentencing.

== Background ==
Fernando Belmontes was convicted of first-degree murder and sentenced to death in California in 1982. During the sentencing phase, Belmontes presented mitigating evidence intended to show that he could lead a constructive life if sentenced to imprisonment rather than death. He testified about his positive conduct while previously incarcerated in the California Youth Authority, including his work on a fire crew, his conversion to Christianity, participation in a Christian sponsorship program, and his willingness to contribute to society if imprisoned for life. A former chaplain described his religious conversion as genuine and testified that he was "salvageable," while another chaplain stated that he could help counsel other prisoners. Belmontes's Christian sponsors also testified about his positive character and involvement in church activities. The jury was instructed to consider specified aggravating and mitigating factors, including the catchall mitigating factor in California Penal Code § 190.3(k), which directed jurors to consider any circumstance that extenuated the gravity of the crime.

In prior challenges to California's factor (k) instruction, the Supreme Court held that the relevant question is whether there is a reasonable likelihood that jurors understood the instruction in a way that prevented them from considering constitutionally relevant mitigating evidence. In Boyde v. California, the Court emphasized that the jury had been instructed to consider all evidence presented during the trial. Later, in Brown v. Payton the Court again applied the same standard in evaluating whether a factor (k) instruction prevented jurors from considering evidence of the defendant's post-crime rehabilitation, including religious conversion and good conduct.

Belmontes argued on direct appeal, in state post-conviction proceedings, and in federal habeas litigation that factor (k) and the related jury instructions prevented the jury from considering his evidence. He contended that this restriction violated the Eighth Amendment's requirement that juries be permitted to consider all relevant mitigating evidence. The California Supreme Court rejected that claim and affirmed his conviction and death sentence.

After exhausting his state remedies, Fernando Belmontes filed a federal habeas corpus petition in 1994. The federal district court denied relief, but the Ninth Circuit reversed and held that his death sentence was unconstitutional.

After the Supreme Court vacated that decision and remanded for reconsideration in light of Brown v. Payton, a divided Ninth Circuit again invalidated Belmontes's sentence, concluding that Payton was distinguishable because the Antiterrorism and Effective Death Penalty Act did not apply to his case. Following a second denial of rehearing en banc, the Supreme Court granted certiorari.

== Opinion of the court ==
The Supreme Court issued an opinion on November 13, 2006. Belmontes's death sentence was reinstated by the Supreme Court.

The Supreme Court held that the Ninth Circuit interpreted factor (k) too narrowly. Relying on its earlier decisions in Boyde v. California and Brown v. Payton, the Court reasoned that, just as evidence of a defendant's background and character (Boyde) and post-crime rehabilitation (Payton) may be mitigating, evidence suggesting a defendant is capable of future good conduct may also make the defendant less deserving of the death penalty. The Court also found that both sides treated the evidence as relevant, and that it was unlikely that jurors would have believed they were forbidden from considering Belmontes's evidence of future good conduct.

=== Stevens dissent ===
The dissent argued that the constitutional principles established in Lockett v. Ohio controlled the case. It emphasized Chief Justice Warren E. Burger's statement that capital sentencing schemes must allow juries to give mitigating weight to any aspect of a defendant's character, record, or circumstances that might justify a sentence less than death. According to the dissent, Belmontes was sentenced during a period of continuing uncertainty about whether juries could consider mitigating evidence that did not directly reduce culpability for the offense.

Justice Stevens said the majority's decision rested on multiple layers of speculation. The dissent contended that the majority's reading depended on technical legal distinctions that would not be apparent to laypersons. In its view, even lawyers and judges had long disagreed about the meaning of factor (k), as illustrated by the prosecutor's position in Brown v. Payton and by uncertainty expressed during oral argument. Given that legal confusion, the dissent found it unrealistic to believe that Belmontes's jury would have understood factor (k) to permit consideration of mitigating evidence unrelated to the circumstances of the crime, particularly years before later decisions clarified the constitutional treatment of such evidence.

That uncertainty, Stevens argued, created an unacceptable risk that constitutionally relevant mitigating evidence was not given effect. Given that Belmontes had spent decades on death row, the dissent concluded that this risk justified relief. It further reasoned that any remaining state interest in carrying out the sentence was outweighed by the need to preserve public confidence in the fairness and reliability of sentencing proceedings where the State seeks to impose the death penalty.

== Later developments ==
Belmontes lost an attempt at clemency in 2010. In 2017, Belmontes died suddenly while incarcerated. At the time of his death, he was high on the priority list of people to be executed in California.
