= Uttecht v. Brown =

- Supreme Court of the United States

Argued April 17, 2007 Decided June 4, 2007
- Full case name: Jeffrey Uttecht, Superintendent, Washington State Penitentiary, Petitioner v. Cal Coburn Brown
- Docket no.: 06-413
- Citations: 551 U.S. 1 (more) 127 S. Ct. 2218; 167 L. Ed. 2d 1014; 2007 U.S. LEXIS 6965; 75 U.S.L.W. 4373; 20 Fla. L. Weekly Fed. S 307
- Argument: Oral argument

Case history
- Prior: Defendant convicted and sentenced to death; affirmed, State v. Brown, 132 Wash. 2d 529, 940 P.2d 546 (1997); petition for habeas corpus denied, Brown v. Lambert, No. 01-cv-715C, 2004 WL 5331923 (W.D. Wash. Sept. 15, 2004); reversed, 451 F.3d 946 (9th Cir. 2006); cert. granted, 549 U.S. 1162 (2007).

Holding
- Appeals courts must defer to a trial judge's decision on whether a potential juror would be able to overcome their personal objections to the death penalty and be open to voting to impose a death sentence.

Court membership
- Chief Justice John Roberts Associate Justices John P. Stevens · Antonin Scalia; Anthony Kennedy · David Souter; Clarence Thomas · Ruth Bader Ginsburg; Stephen Breyer · Samuel Alito

Case opinions
- Majority: Kennedy, joined by Roberts, Scalia, Thomas, Alito
- Dissent: Stevens, joined by Souter, Ginsburg, Breyer
- Dissent: Breyer, joined by Souter

Uttecht v. Brown, 551 U.S. 1 (2007), was a case dealing with jury selection in death penalty cases in which the Supreme Court of the United States held that appeals courts must defer to a trial judge's decision on whether a potential juror would be able to overcome demur about the death penalty and be open to voting to impose a death sentence.

== Background and court history ==
Cal Coburn Brown, who had an extensive criminal history involving violence against women, was convicted of aggravated first degree murder for killing Holly Washa in 1991. Brown carjacked her at knifepoint, held her in a motel for 34 hours, then raped, tortured and eventually murdered her. He left Washa's body in her car's trunk. He was sentenced to death in a Washington State Court. After his conviction was affirmed by state courts, Brown filed a petition for a writ of habeas corpus in federal district court, in which he argued in part that the state trial judge had improperly dismissed a juror without finding that the juror's views on capital punishment would impair his ability to follow the law. The district denied his petition and Brown appealed.

The 9th Circuit Court of Appeals reversed the lower court's ruling and upheld Brown's objections as valid finding that the judge's dismissal of the juror infringed upon clear Supreme Court precedent, and that said dismissal prejudiced the jury against the defendant, nullifying his death sentence.

== Question ==
The question before the Court was whether or not the 9th Circuit Court of Appeals had made an error by not deferring to the trial judge's observations concerning a prospective juror's views on capital punishment and by not applying the statutory presumption of correctness in ruling that the state court decision to remove a juror was contrary to clearly established federal law.

== Opinion of the Supreme Court ==
In a 5-4 conservative-liberal split the majority found that the 9th Circuit had indeed erred when they overruled the Washington State Court's decision and invalidated Brown's death sentence. The precedents of Wainwright v. Witt, 469 U.S. 412 (1985), and Darden v. Wainwright, 447 U.S. 168 (1986), established that a state trial judge may, without presenting any explicit findings or conclusions, remove a juror for cause when the judge determines the juror's views on the death penalty would substantially limit his or her ability to follow the law and perform the duties of a juror. Justice Kennedy, writing for the majority, said that appeals courts must defer to a trial judge's decision on whether a potential juror would be able to overcome qualms regarding the death penalty and be open to voting to impose execution as a sentence.

=== Dissent ===
The dissenting opinion, joined by Justices Ginsburg, Souter and Breyer, and written by Justice Stevens expressed concern that the decision set the disqualification bar for prospective jurors too low and in effect could cause juries to be more likely to vote for a death sentence.

== Subsequent events ==
Brown remained on death row in Washington state. His execution, once scheduled for March 13, 2009, was stayed until September 2010, when the Thurston County Superior Court completed a review of the constitutionality of Washington's lethal injection procedures. The validity of Washington's lethal injection procedures and the competency of the staff administering these duties were upheld on September 7, 2010, and Brown's stay was lifted. Brown was executed on September 10, 2010, the first person executed in the state of Washington since 2001 and the last execution in Washington before capital punishment was ruled unconstitutional in the state in 2018, and its subsequent abolition in 2023.

== See also ==
- List of United States Supreme Court cases
- List of United States Supreme Court cases, volume 551
- Roper V. Simmons
- Miller V. Alabama
- Graham V. Florida,
- Kennedy V. Louisiana
