= Wallace v. Kato =

- Supreme Court of the United States

Decided February 21, 2007
- Full case name: Wallace v. Kato
- Citations: 549 U.S. 384 (more)

Holding
- The statute of limitations upon a §1983 claim seeking damages for a false arrest in violation of the Fourth Amendment, where the arrest is followed by criminal proceedings, begins to run at the time the claimant becomes detained pursuant to legal process and not when the charges based on the arrest are dropped.

Court membership
- Chief Justice John Roberts Associate Justices John P. Stevens · Antonin Scalia; Anthony Kennedy · David Souter; Clarence Thomas · Ruth Bader Ginsburg; Stephen Breyer · Samuel Alito

Case opinions
- Majority: Scalia, joined by Roberts, Kennedy, Thomas, Alito
- Concurrence: Stevens, joined by Souter
- Dissent: Breyer, joined by Ginsburg

Wallace v. Kato, 549 U.S. 384 (2007), was a United States Supreme Court case in which the court held that the statute of limitations on a §1983 claim seeking damages for a false arrest in violation of the Fourth Amendment, where the arrest is followed by criminal proceedings, begins to run at the time the claimant becomes detained pursuant to legal process and not when the charges based on the arrest are dropped.

== Background ==
In January 1994, Chicago police arrested Wallace, a minor, for murder. He was tried and convicted, but the charges were ultimately dropped in April 2002. In April 2003, he sued the city and several of its officers under 42 U. S. C. §1983, seeking damages for, among other things, his unlawful arrest in violation of the Fourth Amendment. The federal District Court granted respondents summary judgment, and the Seventh Circuit Court of Appeals affirmed, ruling that the §1983 suit was time barred because Wallace's cause of action accrued at the time of his arrest, not when his conviction was later set aside.

The Supreme Court granted certiorari.

== Opinion of the court ==
The Supreme Court issued an opinion on February 21, 2007.
