= Microsoft Corp. v. AT&T Corp. =

- Supreme Court of the United States

Argued February 21, 2007 Decided April 30, 2007
- Full case name: Microsoft Corporation v. AT&T Corp.
- Docket no.: 05-1056
- Citations: 550 U.S. 437 (more) 127 S. Ct. 1746; 167 L. Ed. 2d 737; 2007 U.S. LEXIS 4744; 75 U.S.L.W. 4307; 82 U.S.P.Q.2d 1400

Case history
- Prior: No. 1:01-cv-04872 (S.D.N.Y. (Mar. 5, 2004); affirmed, 414 F.3d 1366 (Fed. Cir. 2005); cert. granted, 549 U.S. 991 (2006).

Holding
- Federal Circuit's judgment was reversed, Microsoft was not liable for patent infringement under §271(f)

Court membership
- Chief Justice John Roberts Associate Justices John P. Stevens · Antonin Scalia; Anthony Kennedy · David Souter; Clarence Thomas · Ruth Bader Ginsburg; Stephen Breyer · Samuel Alito

Case opinions
- Plurality: Ginsburg, joined by Scalia, Kennedy, Souter
- Concurrence: Alito (all but footnote 14), joined by Thomas, Breyer
- Dissent: Stevens
- Roberts took no part in the consideration or decision of the case.

Laws applied
- 35 U.S.C. § 271(f)

Microsoft Corp. v. AT&T Corp., 550 U.S. 437 (2007), was a United States Supreme Court case in which the Supreme Court reversed a previous decision by the Federal Circuit and ruled in favor of Microsoft, holding that Microsoft was not liable for infringement on AT&T's patent under 35 U.S.C. § 271(f).

In this case, Microsoft exported abroad the "master version" of its Windows software disk, which incorporated a speech processing function claimed by one of AT&T's patents, with the intent that such software be copied abroad for installation onto foreign-manufactured computers.

According to the Supreme Court, liability for such unauthorized replication and installation would have to arise under the patent laws of those foreign countries, not the U.S. Patent Act. Although AT&T argued that the Supreme Court's decision actually created a "loophole" for software makers to avoid liability under § 271(f), the Supreme Court explained that it is Congress, not the Court, that is responsible for addressing any such loopholes.

== Background ==
=== Factual background ===
AT&T held a patent (US Patent No. 4472832) on a program that could digitally encode and compress recorded speech on a computer. Microsoft's Windows operating system had the potential to infringe that patent because Windows incorporated a software called NetMeeting that, when installed, enabled a computer to process speech in the same manner as claimed by AT&T's patent. Microsoft shipped abroad a "master version" of Windows, either on a disk or via encrypted electronic transmission, to foreign manufacturers. These manufacturers first used the master version of Windows to generate copies, and then installed the copies onto the computers they sold to users abroad. AT&T accused Microsoft of infringing U.S. Patent Re. 32580, which was a reissue of U.S. Patent No. 4472832, and filed a suit charging Microsoft with liability for the foreign replications and installations of Windows.

In general, no patent infringement occurred when a patented product was made and sold in another country. However, section 271(f) of the Patent Act, in response to Deepsouth Packing Co. v. Laitram Corp and adopted in 1984, provided that infringement would occur when one "supplies" a patented invention's "components" from the United States for the purpose of "combination" abroad.

=== Procedural background ===
In 2001, AT&T filed an infringement suit to the U.S. District Court for the Southern District of New York, charging Microsoft with liability for the foreign installations of Windows. Microsoft responded that: (1) Windows software could not be a “component” of a patented invention within the meaning of § 271(f) because it was intangible information; (2) even if the Windows software were a “component,” no actual “components” had been “supplied” from the United States as required by § 271(f) because the copies installed on the foreign-assembled computers had all been made abroad.

However, rejecting all these responses, the District Court held Microsoft liable under § 271(f). After Microsoft appealed, a divided panel of the Federal Circuit still affirmed the District Court's decision. In October 2006, the Supreme Court finally agreed to address the conflicting case law surrounding § 271(f) by granting a writ of certiorari. Oral argument was held on February 26, 2007 in front of eight Justices. On April 30, 2007, the Supreme Court reversed the Federal Circuit and ruled in favor of Microsoft.

== Opinion of the court ==
=== The District Court's opinion: in favor of AT&T ===
The U.S. District Court for the Southern District of New York explained that § 271(f) did not limit “components” to only physical machines or tangible structures, but also intangible information or data. Therefore, the district court rejected Microsoft's argument that software can not be a “component” of a patented invention under § 271(f).

As for the copies made abroad, the district court held that such copies should still be considered as “supplied from" the United States because the code or master disk used for foreign replication was originally manufactured and shipped from the U.S. Therefore, the court denied Microsoft's claim that foreign copies should not be considered as "supplied from" the United States. By considering the legislative intent of § 271(f) to prohibit the circumvention of infringement through exportation, the Court ruled that Microsoft was liable for patent infringement. Microsoft appealed

=== The Federal Circuit's opinion: Affirmed ===
The appellate court relied on prior Federal Circuit case law Eolas Technologies Incorporated v. Microsoft Corporation and held that software code alone qualifies as an invention eligible for patenting. Since statutory language does not limit § 271(f) to patented ‘machines’ or ‘physical structures,’ software can very well be a ‘component’ of patented invention under § 271(f)”.

The Federal Circuit also explained that the act of "copying" is subsumed in the act of "supplying". Therefore, the exportation of the master disk, with the specific intent to be replicated abroad, was an act considered as “supplied or caused to be supplied from the United States within the meaning of § 271(f).”

However, Federal Circuit Judge Randall R. Rader objected to the view that “supplies” includes the act of foreign “copying”. Judge Rader expressed concerns that such an interpretation was an impermissible “extraterritorial expansion” of U.S. patent law because it reached copying activity overseas. In his view, AT&T's remedy lied not in U.S. law, but rather the law of the foreign country in which the infringement due to copying occurred.

=== The Supreme Court's opinion: Reversed ===
The Supreme Court accepted Microsoft's petition for a writ of certiorari, mainly in order to answer two questions:

1. Whether digital software code can be considered a “component of a patented invention” within the meaning of § 271(f)(1); and, if so,
2. Whether copies of such a “component” made in a foreign country are considered as “supplied from the United States.”

On April 30, 2007, the Supreme Court, in a 7-1 majority, reversed the Federal Circuit ruling in favor of Microsoft.

==== Majority opinion ====
The Supreme Court ruled that abstract software code was an “idea” lacking physical embodiment and it could not be a “usable, combinable part of a computer.” Justice Ginsburg analogized abstract software code to a detailed set of instructions such as that of a blueprint. Further, she observed that Congress did not include the export of design tools such as blueprints in enacting the statutory provision. Therefore, Justice Ginsburg argued that the Windows software must be encoded or expressed in some sort of tangible medium, in order to be considered as a "component" under § 271(f). The Court thus denied AT&T's characterization of abstract software as a combinable component that qualified for § 271(f) liability.

Furthermore, the Court largely agreed that the copies of Windows used to install on the foreign computers were not considered as “supplied” from the United States. The distinction between “supply” and “copy” was legally relevant for liability purposes under § 271(f). Although software copying was much easier compared with the action of "copy" in traditional industries, the liability should not be affected by the ease of copying.

According to the reasoning above, the Court ruled that software code did not qualify as a component for purposes of triggering liability under § 271(f) and the copies installed onto the computers sold abroad were not considered as "supplied" by Microsoft from the United States either.

==== Concurring opinion ====
Microsoft suggested that even a disk shipped from the United States and used to install Windows directly on a foreign computer, would not give rise to liability under § 271(f) if the disk were removed after installation.

Justice Samuel Alito, in a concurrence joined by Justices Thomas and Breyer, agreed with Microsoft in terms of this particular issue, but through different reasoning as the majority opinion.

He emphasized that § 271(f) required the component to be "combined" with other components to form the infringing device, meaning that the component must remain a part of the device. As for this case, once the copying and installation process were completed, the Windows program was recorded in a physical form in magnetic fields on the computers' hard drives. No physical aspect of the Windows CD-ROM—original disk or copy—was ever incorporated in the computer itself if the disk were removed after installation.

Since no physical object originating from the United States was combined with those computers sold abroad, Justice Alito believed there was no patent infringement within the meaning of § 271(f) and it was irrelevant whether the Windows software was installed directly from the master disk or not.

==== Dissent ====
In a lone dissent, Justice Stevens disagreed with the Supreme Court's major opinion that the abstract software was analogous to an abstract set of instruction, i.e., a blueprint, and could not be regarded as a "component".

In his view, unlike a blueprint that merely instructed a user how to do something, software actually directly caused infringing conduct to occur. In addition, he argued that the abstract software code, whether embodied in a physical medium or not, should be considered a “component” within the meaning of § 271(f) because it had no other intended use except for installation onto a computer's hard drive.

Based on these reasons, Justice Stevens explained that he would affirm previous Federal Circuit's majority opinion in this case.

== Impact ==
=== Opinions from the society ===
Because of the major impact the decision would have on the U.S. software industry, this case drew a lot of attention from both academics and leaders in the software industry. These interested parties, including law professors, the Department of Justice, and some software companies, submitted amicus briefs on behalf of AT&T and Microsoft.

Microsoft had gained broad support in its defense efforts from the Bush administration, Amazon.com Inc., Intel Corp., Yahoo Inc., and also from industry groups such as the Business Software Alliance and the American Intellectual Property Law Association.

One big concern from these Microsoft supporters was that a decision in favor of AT&T could have put the U.S. Patent and Trademark Office into the role of an arbiter of intellectual property worldwide and pushed software prices higher, which could potentially lead to substantial losses of competitive advantage of U.S. manufacturers in foreign markets.

The Software Freedom Law Center even filed an amicus brief urging that software was not eligible for patent protection because the courts had long held that laws of nature, abstract ideas, and mathematical algorithms were not eligible for patent protection, and software was nothing more than a description of a mathematical algorithm.

=== Discussions of § 271(f) ===
In this case, the Supreme Court reversed the previous decisions from the Federal Circuit and the District Court, which raised some discussions on the extraterritorial applications and possible revisions of § 271(f).

From some scholars, the Federal Circuit's decision on this case represented the peak of extraterritoriality in modern U.S. patent law as 1) it expanded the definition of "components" in § 271(f) to encompass intangible items and 2) it broadly interpreted “supply,” for the purposes of § 271(f), to include the act of providing a master component from which copies were made abroad.

On the other hand, while the Supreme Court's conceded that their decision may effectively created a “loophole” for software companies to avoid liability under § 271(f), they still rejected the Federal Circuit's broad interpretation of Section § 271(f) as it would have increased the number of products sold abroad within the reach of US patent laws, which may introduce inevitable conflict of different patent systems and standards in different countries. Although the Supreme Court's decision could be seen as a blow to US patent holders like AT&T, actually these patent holders still had the alternative of enforcing these rights through foreign patent systems, which were the more appropriate protection mechanism.

In terms of the reach of US patent laws and § 271(f) potential revision for software industries, the Supreme Court had invited Congress to consider whether it was desirable to revise patent infringement liability under §271(f) to include exporting software within the intent that such product be copied abroad for use on foreign computers.

== See also ==
- Software patent
- Patent infringement
- United States Patent and Trademark Office
- Extraterritoriality
- Microsoft NetMeeting

== Recent § 271(f) cases ==
- Union Carbide v. Shell Oil
- NTP v. Research in Motion
- AT&T v. Microsoft
- Eolas v. Microsoft
- Pellegrini v. Analog Devices
- Bayer v. Housey Pharms
