= Wilkie v. Robbins =

- Supreme Court of the United States

Argued March 19, 2007 Decided June 25, 2007
- Full case name: Charles Wilkie, et al., Petitioners v. Harvey Frank Robbins
- Citations: 551 U.S. 537 (more) 127 S. Ct. 2588; 168 L. Ed. 2d 389; 2007 U.S. LEXIS 8513; 75 U.S.L.W. 4529; 22 A.L.R. Fed. 2d 695; 20 Fla. L. Weekly Fed. S 443

Holding
- A government agency taking "too much" legitimate against a person does not create a Bivens claim, and that agency's retaliation against a person for resistance to agency action does not create a Bivens claim either.

Court membership
- Chief Justice John Roberts Associate Justices John P. Stevens · Antonin Scalia; Anthony Kennedy · David Souter; Clarence Thomas · Ruth Bader Ginsburg; Stephen Breyer · Samuel Alito

Case opinions
- Majority: Souter, joined by Roberts, Scalia, Kennedy, Thomas, Breyer, Alito; Stevens, Ginsburg (Part III)
- Concurrence: Thomas, joined by Scalia
- Concur/dissent: Ginsburg, joined by Stevens

Laws applied
- RICO Act

Wilkie v. Robbins, 551 U.S. 537 (2007), was a United States Supreme Court case that concerned the scope of qualified immunity for government officials working in the Bureau of Land Management (BLM). Specifically, the Supreme Court held that BLM employees could not be liable for an alleged retaliation claim against Robbins, a farm owner, because other avenues for relief were available. Though these workers may have been tough in negotiations with Robbins over access over his land, none of that rose to the level of a constitutional violation.

== Background ==
In 1994, Frank Robbins purchased a Wyoming dude ranch which functioned as a commercial guest resort. The original owner of the property had signed an agreement with the BLM granting an easement along a road which crossed the ranch. The Bureau failed to record the easement, and it ceased to exist when the property was transferred to Robbins. Robbins continued to graze cattle in the area, leading to a BLM employee demanding a new easement to replace the old one. At trial, Robbins claimed that employees of the BLM engaged in a "campaign of harassment and intimidation aimed at forcing him to re-grant the lost easement."

In 1998, after a series of further conflicts with BLM officials, Robbins filed a lawsuit. He claimed that the BLM actions violated the RICO statute, a law which bars racketeering. Additionally, he argued that the federal officials violated his Fourth and Fifth Amendment rights.

The District Court dismissed all of Robbins' claims on the grounds that there were other alternative means of relief, absent a lawsuit. The Court of Appeals for the Tenth Circuit reversed, finding that judicial relief was open for "constitutional violations committed by individual federal employees unrelated to final agency action." After a series of proceedings between the District Court and the Court of Appeals, the BLM officials sought review before the Supreme Court.

== Opinion of the Court ==
Justice David Souter wrote the majority opinion which reversed the Tenth Circuit and held that the BLM agents were not liable for the alleged retaliation.

In reaching that finding, Souter wrote that "we think [that] any damages remedy for actions by Government employees who push too hard for the Government's benefit may come better, if at all, through legislation." The harms of "illegitimate pressure" were simply too ambiguous for courts to handle them. Additionally, Souter rejected the RICO claim, finding that none of the BLM actions could be "generically classified as extortionate."

=== Thomas' concurrence ===
Justice Clarence Thomas wrote a short concurring opinion, joined by Justice Scalia. While he joined the entirety of Souter's majority opinion, he stressed that attaching liability to government officials' conduct was "a relic of the heady days in which this Court assumed common-law powers to create causes of action."

=== Ginsburg's dissent ===
Justice Ruth Bader Ginsburg wrote a dissenting opinion, with which Justice John Paul Stevens joined. Ginsburg focused on the Fifth Amendment property issues in the case, arguing that "the Fifth Amendment provide[s] an effective check on federal officers who abuse their regulatory powers by harassing and punishing property owners who refuse to surrender their property to the United States without fair compensation." Therefore, she argued, Robbins had a cause of action against the government and his case should have been allowed to go forward.
