= Osborn v. Haley =

- Supreme Court of the United States

Decided January 22, 2007
- Full case name: Osborn v. Haley
- Citations: 549 U.S. 225 (more)

Holding
- Although 28 U.S.C. § 1447(d) generally prevents appeals of decisions to remand removed cases back to state court, that statute does not apply to cases removed under the Westfall Act.

Court membership
- Chief Justice John Roberts Associate Justices John P. Stevens · Antonin Scalia; Anthony Kennedy · David Souter; Clarence Thomas · Ruth Bader Ginsburg; Stephen Breyer · Samuel Alito

Case opinions
- Majority: Ginsburg, joined by Roberts, Stevens, Kennedy, Alito; Souter (except Parts II–B & II–C); Breyer (Parts I & II)
- Concur/dissent: Souter
- Concur/dissent: Breyer
- Dissent: Scalia, joined by Thomas

Laws applied
- Westfall Act

Osborn v. Haley, 549 U.S. 225 (2007), was a United States Supreme Court case in which the court held that, although 28 U.S.C. § 1447(d) generally prevents appeals of decisions to remand removed cases back to state court, that statute does not apply to cases removed under the Westfall Act. Thus, such a removal order can be appealed immediately.

== Background ==
The federal statute commonly known as the Westfall Act accords federal employees absolute immunity from tort claims arising out of acts undertaken in the course of their official duties and empowers the United States Attorney General to certify that a federal employee sued for wrongful or negligent conduct "was acting within the scope of his office or employment at the time of the incident out of which the claim arose". Upon such certification, the United States is substituted as defendant in place of the employee, and the action is thereafter governed by the Federal Tort Claims Act. If the action commenced in state court, the Westfall Act calls for its removal to a federal district court, and renders the attorney general's certification "conclusiv[e]... for purposes of removal".

Pat Osborn sued federal employee Barry Haley in state court. Osborn alleged that Haley tortiously interfered with her employment with a private contractor, that he conspired to cause her wrongful discharge, and that his efforts to bring about her discharge were outside the scope of his employment. The United States Attorney, serving as the attorney general's delegate, certified that Haley was acting within the scope of his employment at the time of the conduct alleged in Osborn's complaint. She thereupon removed the case to a federal district court, where she asserted that the alleged wrongdoing never occurred. The federal District Court, relying in Osborn's allegations, entered an order that rejected the Westfall Act certification, denied the government's motion to substitute the United States as defendant in Haley's place, and remanded the case to the state court. The Sixth Circuit Court of Appeals vacated the district court's order, holding that a Westfall Act certification is not improper simply because the United States denies the occurrence of the incident on which the plaintiff centrally relies. Based on §2679(d)(2)'s direction that certification is "conclusiv[e]... for purposes of removal," the Court of Appeals instructed the district court to retain jurisdiction over the case.

The Supreme Court granted certiorari.

== Opinion of the court ==
The Supreme Court issued an opinion on January 22, 2007.
