= National Ass'n of Home Builders v. Defenders of Wildlife =

National Assn. of Home Builders v. Defenders of Wildlife
- Supreme Court of the United States

Argued April 17, 2007 Decided June 25, 2007
- Full case name: National Assn. of Home Builders v. Defenders of Wildlife
- Citations: 551 U.S. 644 (more) 127 S. Ct. 2518; 168 L. Ed. 2d 467; 2007 U.S. LEXIS 8312

Case history
- Prior: 420 F.3d 946 (9th Cir. 2005); cert. granted, 549 U.S. 1105 (2007).

Holding
- Section 7 of the Endangered Species Act applies only to federal agency actions over which the agency has discretionary involvement or control.

Court membership
- Chief Justice John Roberts Associate Justices John P. Stevens · Antonin Scalia; Anthony Kennedy · David Souter; Clarence Thomas · Ruth Bader Ginsburg; Stephen Breyer · Samuel Alito

Case opinions
- Majority: Alito, joined by Roberts, Scalia, Kennedy, Thomas
- Dissent: Stevens, joined by Souter, Ginsburg, Breyer

Laws applied
- Clean Water Act, Endangered Species Act

National Assn. of Home Builders v. Defenders of Wildlife, 551 U.S. 644 (2007), was a United States Supreme Court in which the court held that Section 7 of the Endangered Species Act applies only to federal agency actions over which the agency has discretionary involvement or control. The case was case about federal jurisdiction over anti-pollution statutes. Justice Samuel Alito wrote the opinion of the Court, ruling that the Endangered Species Act did not require the Environmental Protection Agency to apply additional criteria when evaluating a transfer of pollution control jurisdiction under the Clean Water Act. Justices John Paul Stevens and Stephen Breyer wrote dissenting opinions.

== Facts ==
The Clean Water Act instructs the Environmental Protection Agency to turn over authority under the National Pollution Discharge Elimination System to a state if that state's proposal meets nine listed criteria. Arizona issued such a proposal. The EPA regional office replied with the concern that the transfer might violate the Endangered Species Act, which prohibits agencies from taking actions that might jeopardize endangered species. The EPA consulted the Fish and Wildlife Service, which advised that the Endangered Species Act was inapplicable because the EPA had no authority to consider additional factors beyond the nine Clean Water Act criteria. On the advice of the Fish and Wildlife Service, the EPA approved the transfer of authority to Arizona.

== Procedural history ==
Defenders of Wildlife, a non-profit organization concerned with endangered species, challenged the transfer, arguing that the Endangered Species Act imposed an independent requirement on the EPA's decision to approve the transfer. The EPA argued the Endangered Species Act was not an independent source of authority, but imposes requirements only on the discretionary decisions of federal agencies. Since its decision was non-discretionary under the Clean Water Act, the agency argued, the Endangered Species Act did not apply. (The National Association of Home Builders moved to intervene in the case which was granted, and ultimately found their name in the case citation.)

The U.S. Court of Appeals for the Ninth Circuit found in favor of the Defenders of Wildlife and invalidated the transfer, finding that the Fish and Wildlife Service opinion was flawed and that the EPA's reliance on it "arbitrary and capricious" and inconsistent with previous transfers of permitting authority, in which the impact on endangered species was considered.

== Decision ==
=== Issues ===
1. Can a court require that state-run Clean Water Act pollution permitting programs include protections for endangered species?
2. Does the Endangered Species Act constitute an independent source of authority for federal agencies?
3. Is the EPA's approval of a state permitting program the legally relevant cause of impacts to endangered species resulting from future private land use activities?
4. Was the Court of Appeals correct that the EPA's decision to transfer pollution-permitting authority to Arizona under the Clean Water Act was arbitrary and capricious because it was based on inconsistent interpretations of the Endangered Species Act? If so, should the Court of Appeals have sent the case back to the EPA for further proceedings without ruling on the interpretation of the Endangered Species Act?

=== Opinion of the Court ===
The opinion of the Court, written by Justice Alito, held that the EPA's decision was not arbitrary and capricious, even if internally inconsistent. "The federal courts ordinarily are empowered to review only an agency’s final action," Alito wrote, "and the fact that a preliminary determination by a local agency representative is later overruled at a higher level within the agency does not render the decisionmaking process arbitrary and capricious." The Court also agreed that because the decision was not discretionary, the Endangered Species Act did not apply.

=== Stevens's dissent ===
Justice Stevens dissented, writing that while the Endangered Species Act and the Clean Water Act conflicted, precedent under Tennessee Valley Authority v. Hill and others require that the Endangered Species Act's requirements be given precedence over other aims of federal agencies.

=== Breyer's dissent ===
Justice Breyer joined in Stevens's dissent, but differed in reserving judgment "as to whether §7(a)(2) of the Endangered Species Act of 1973 ... really covers every possible agency action even of totally unrelated agencies...."
