= 2006 term per curiam opinions of the Supreme Court of the United States =

The Supreme Court of the United States handed down eight per curiam opinions during its 2006 term, which began October 2, 2006 and concluded September 30, 2007. (Note: The descriptions of two opinions have been omitted: In Toledo-Flores v. United States, 549 U.S. 69 (2006), the Court dismissed the writ of certiorari as improvidently granted.; In Claiborne v. United States, 551 U.S. 87 (2007), the Court vacated the Court of Appeals for the Eighth Circuit's judgment as moot, upon being notified that the petitioner had died.)

Because per curiam decisions are issued from the Court as an institution, these opinions all lack the attribution of authorship or joining votes to specific justices. All justices on the Court at the time the decision was handed down are assumed to have participated and concurred unless otherwise noted.

== Court membership ==
Chief Justice: John Roberts

Associate Justices: John Paul Stevens, Antonin Scalia, Anthony Kennedy, David Souter, Clarence Thomas, Ruth Bader Ginsburg, Stephen Breyer, Samuel Alito

== Purcell v. Gonzalez ==
- Full caption: Helen Purcell, Maricopa County Recorder, et al. v. Maria v. Gonzalez, et al.
- Citations: 549 U.S. 1; 2006 U.S. LEXIS 8000
- Prior history: Injunction denied, No. 06-1268, D. Ariz. Sept. 11, 2006; injunction granted, 9th Cir.
- Full text of the opinion: official slip opinion

549 U.S. 1
Decided October 20, 2006.
Ninth Circuit vacated and remanded.

Stevens filed a concurrence.

Named for Maricopa County Recorder Helen Purcell, this case concerned whether to allow a new voter ID law to be enforced during the 2006 election. It was decided only 15 days prior, and established the "Purcell principle" against changing election rules very close to an election.

== Burton v. Stewart ==
- Full caption: Lonnie Lee Burton v. Belinda Stewart, Superintendent, Stafford Creek Corrections Center
- Citations: 549 U.S. 147
- Prior history: Petition denied, sub nom., Burton v. Walter, W.D. Wash.; affirmed, 21 Fed. Appx. 632 (9th Cir. 2001); cert. denied, 535 U.S. 1060 (2002); second petition denied, sub nom., Burton v. Waddington, W.D. Wash.; affirmed, 142 Fed. Appx. 297 (9th Cir. 2005)
- Full text of the opinion: official slip opinion

549 U.S. 147
Decided January 9, 2007.
Ninth Circuit vacated and remanded.

== Lance v. Coffman ==
- Full caption: Keith Lance v. Mike Coffman, Colorado Secretary of State
- Citations: 549 U.S. 437
- Prior history: Dismissed, sub nom., Lance v. Dennis, 379 F. Supp. 2d 1117 D. Colo. (2005); vacated, remanded, 546 U.S. 459 (2006); dismissed in part, 444 F. Supp. 2d 1149 (D. Colo. 2006)
- Full text of the opinion: official slip opinion

549 U.S. 437
Decided March 5, 2007.
District Court for the District of Colorado vacated in part and remanded and affirmed in part.

== Roper v. Weaver ==
- Full caption: Don Roper, Superintendent, Potosi Correction Center, Petitioner v. William Weaver
- Citations: 550 U.S. 598
- Prior history: Sentence vacated, sub nom. Weaver v. Bowersox, 438 F.3d 832 (8th Cir. 2006)
- Full text of the opinion: official slip opinion

550 U.S. 598
Argued March 21, 2007.
Decided May 21, 2007.
The Court dismissed the writ of certiorari as improvidently granted.

The Court wrote that it was "now aware of circumstances that persuade us that dismissal of the writ is the appropriate manner in which to dispose of this case." The Court had granted review to decide whether the Court of Appeals had correctly applied the Antiterrorism and Effective Death Penalty Act of 1996 (AEDPA) in setting aside Weaver's capital sentence that he challenged by a petition of habeas corpus. Upon review, the Court discovered that Weaver only filed the current habeas petition after the enactment of AEDPA because the District Court had erroneously dismissed Weaver's first petition. As two other petitioners were "virtually identically situated" to Weaver yet not governed by AEDPA's stricter standards, the Court dismissed so a different legal standard would not apply to Weaver's case simply because the District Court had committed an error.

Roberts filed a concurrence, stating that he did not agree with all of the reasons given in the Court's per curiam opinion, but that he agreed with the disposition. Scalia filed a dissent, joined by Thomas and Alito.

== Los Angeles County v. Rettele ==
- Full caption: Los Angeles County, California, et al. v. Max Rettele et al.
- Citations: 550 U.S. 609; 2007 U.S LEXIS 5900
- Prior history: Summary judgment for defendants; reversed, 186 Fed. Appx. 765 (9th Cir. 2006); rehearing en banc denied
- Full text of the opinion: official slip opinion

550 U.S. 609
Decided May 21, 2007.
Ninth Circuit reversed.

The Court held that the Fourth Amendment's prohibition against unreasonable searches and seizures was not violated when officers execute a valid warrant and act in a reasonable manner, even though the individual in the home they searched was engaging in private, non-criminal activity. In this case, the officers entered a home pursuant to a valid warrant. They found two people asleep in bed. At gunpoint, they ordered the nude people out of the bed. These people were not related to the investigation and were not the same race as the person described in the warrant.

The District Court had granted summary judgment in favor of the County of Los Angeles. The Ninth Circuit reversed, concluding that the deputies violated the Fourth Amendment and were not entitled to qualified immunity, because a reasonable deputy would have stopped the search upon discovering that the respondents were of a different race than the suspects and because a reasonable deputy would not have ordered respondents, who were unclothed, from their bed.

The Court reversed, stating that because the Fourth Amendment allows warrants to issue based on probable cause, "a standard well short of absolute certainty. Valid warrants will issue to search the innocent, and people like Rettele and Sadler unfortunately bear the cost. Officers executing search warrants on occasion enter a house when residents are engaged in private activity; and the resulting frustration, embarrassment, and humiliation may be real, as was true here. When officers execute a valid warrant and act in a reasonable manner to protect themselves from harm, however, the Fourth Amendment is not violated."

Souter noted without separate opinion that he would deny the petition for a writ of certiorari. Stevens filed a concurrence, joined by Ginsburg.

== Erickson v. Pardus ==
- Full caption: William Erickson v. Barry J. Pardus, et al.
- Citations: 551 U.S. 89
- Prior history: Dismissed, D. Colo.; affirmed, 198 Fed. Appx. 694 (10th Cir. 2006)
- Full text of the opinion: official slip opinion

551 U.S. 89
Decided June 4, 2007.
Tenth Circuit vacated and remanded.

Scalia noted without separate opinion that he would deny the petition for a writ of certiorari. Thomas filed a dissent.

== See also ==
- List of United States Supreme Court cases, volume 549
- List of United States Supreme Court cases, volume 550
- List of United States Supreme Court cases, volume 551
