= Carey v. Musladin =

- Supreme Court of the United States

Argued October 11, 2006 Decided December 11, 2006
- Full case name: Thomas L. Carey, Warden v. Mathew Musladin
- Docket no.: 05-785
- Citations: 549 U.S. 70 (more) 127 S. Ct. 649; 166 L. Ed. 2d 482; 2006 U.S. LEXIS 9587; 75 U.S.L.W. 4019; 06 Cal. Daily Op. Serv. 11,315; 20 Fla. L. Weekly Fed. S 23

Case history
- Prior: Defendant convicted, Santa Clara County Superior Court (Nov. 1, 1995); conviction upheld, sub nom., People v. Musladin, No. H015159 (Cal. Ct. App. 1997); petition for writ of habeas corpus denied (Cal. June 2, 2000); petition for writ of habeas corpus denied, No. CV-00-01998-JL (N.D. Cal. May 14, 2003); rev'd sub nom., Musladin v. LaMarque, 403 F.3d 1072 (9th Cir.); rehearing denied, 427 F.3d 647 (9th Cir.); op. withdrawn and superseded, 427 F.3d 653 (9th Cir. 2005); cert. granted, 547 U.S. 1069 (2006).

Holding
- State appellate court's determination that defendant was not deprived of his right to a fair trial when courtroom spectators wore buttons depicting murder victim was not "contrary to or unreasonable application of clearly established law."

Court membership
- Chief Justice John Roberts Associate Justices John P. Stevens · Antonin Scalia; Anthony Kennedy · David Souter; Clarence Thomas · Ruth Bader Ginsburg; Stephen Breyer · Samuel Alito

Case opinions
- Majority: Thomas, joined by Roberts, Scalia, Ginsburg, Breyer, Alito
- Concurrence: Stevens
- Concurrence: Kennedy
- Concurrence: Souter

Laws applied
- Antiterrorism and Effective Death Penalty Act

Carey v. Musladin, 549 U.S. 70 (2006), is a United States Supreme Court case involving the standard for when a federal court can grant habeas corpus relief to overturn a criminal conviction based on the state court's misapplication of established federal law. At issue was whether a criminal defendant's constitutional right to a fair trial was violated when relatives of the alleged victim were permitted to sit in the courtroom as spectators during the trial, wearing buttons that displayed the victim's image.

The Supreme Court ruled that the state court did not unreasonably apply clearly established federal law when it upheld the conviction. The Court's prior rulings on when courtroom practices prejudiced the right to a fair trial were limited to state-sponsored conduct, and had consequently left it an open question regarding the conduct of spectators.

== Background ==
In 1994 Mathew Musladin shot and killed Tom Studer. Musladin admitted to killing Studer during the trial, but claimed he did so in self-defense. The jury rejected Musladin's self-defense claim and convicted him of murder. During the trial, members of Studer's family sat in the front row of the gallery wearing buttons with pictures of Studer. Musladin's attorney objected to the buttons, but the trial court refused to order the buttons removed, saying it saw "no possible prejudice to the defendant." Musladin appealed the decision to the California Court of Appeal, which affirmed the trial court's decision.

Musladin then filed a habeas corpus petition in federal court, which the court denied. The Ninth Circuit appeals court reversed, finding that the state court's decision on the buttons was in violation of the Antiterrorism and Effective Death Penalty Act of 1996, because it "was contrary to, or involved an unreasonable application of, clearly established Federal law, as determined by the Supreme Court of the United States." The federal law in question was a test for inherent prejudice established by the Supreme Court in Estelle v. Williams and Holbrook v. Flynn. The test indicated prejudice against the defendant must be justified by an essential "state" interest. The appeals court found the test was applicable to behavior by private spectators and that the decision to permit the buttons unfairly prejudiced the defendant. The state appealed to the United States Supreme Court.

== Opinion of the Court ==
In his brief majority opinion, Justice Clarence Thomas began by indicating that Williams v. Taylor limits the phrase "clearly established federal law" to the holdings of previous decisions instead of the dicta . In both Williams and Flynn, the two cases cited by the appeals court, the holdings were regarding government-sponsored action, whereas the buttons were worn by private spectators. Thomas pointed out that there is no clear court holding on the test for inherently prejudicial action by private spectators. Lacking such a holding, it could not be said that there was any "clearly established federal law" that the trial court violated by permitting the buttons.

=== Concurring opinions ===
Three justices wrote opinions concurring in the judgment but disagreeing with parts of the reasoning. Justice Souter indicated that prior precedent on prejudice in the courtroom applied generally, including to spectators. However, due to prior decisions specifically regarding similar spectator actions and a concern about free speech, Souter did not find the trial judge had acted unreasonably in permitting the buttons. Justice Stevens embraced much of Souter's opinion, but disagreed that the First Amendment would trump concerns about prejudice. The bulk of his concurring opinion endorsed the importance of dicta in guiding lower courts. Justice Kennedy also agreed that prior cases would apply generally to spectator behavior, but did not find the precedent necessary to indicate that the buttons were coercive or intimidating to the defendant. He endorsed the future creation of such a precedent to clarify matters.
