= Smith v. Texas (2007) =

- Supreme Court of the United States

Argued January 17, 2007 Decided April 25, 2007
- Full case name: LaRoyce Lathair Smith v. Texas
- Citations: 550 U.S. 297 (more) 127 S. Ct. 1686; 167 L. Ed. 2d 632

Case history
- Prior: Smith v. Texas, 543 U.S. 37 (2004) ("Smith I"); Ex Parte Smith, 185 S.W.3d 455 (Tex. Crim. App. 2006); cert. granted, 549 U.S. 948 (2006).

Holding
- Texas Court of Criminal Appeals reversed

Court membership
- Chief Justice John Roberts Associate Justices John P. Stevens · Antonin Scalia; Anthony Kennedy · David Souter; Clarence Thomas · Ruth Bader Ginsburg; Stephen Breyer · Samuel Alito

Case opinions
- Majority: Kennedy, joined by Stevens, Souter, Ginsburg, Breyer
- Concurrence: Souter
- Dissent: Alito, joined by Roberts, Scalia, Thomas

Laws applied
- U.S. Const. amend. VIII

Smith v. Texas, 550 U.S. 297 (2007), was a United States Supreme Court case about a challenge to a Texas death penalty court procedure. Justice Anthony Kennedy wrote the opinion of the Court, holding 5-4 that the Texas procedure was improper. Justice Samuel Alito wrote a dissent.

== Background ==
LaRoyce Lathair Smith was convicted of capital murder for the January 7, 1991 murder of 19-year-old Jennifer Soto, a Dallas Taco Bell employee. He was sentenced to death by a jury in Dallas County, Texas.

Smith was tried during the period between Penry v. Lynaugh and Penry v. Johnson. At the time of Smith's trial, Texas capital sentencing law required juries to answer a set of "special-issue" questions that determined whether a defendant would receive the death penalty. After Penry I ruled that the statutory special issues sentencing procedure was constitutionally inadequate, Texas criminal courts began instructing juries to answer one of the questions falsely if they believed a death sentence was inappropriate. This instruction to the jury to nullify the sentencing proceeding was later held inadequate in Penry II.

=== Procedural history ===
Before jury selection, Smith filed three motions challenging the Texas capital-sentencing instructions. The first argued that the special-issue questions were constitutionally inadequate under Jurek v. Texas and Penry v. Lynaugh because Texas law did not allow the trial court to instruct the jury in a way that would permit a reasoned moral response to mitigating evidence outside the special issues.

The second motion contended that, although Jurek had upheld Texas's sentencing scheme facially, Texas courts had not interpreted the special issues broadly enough to allow juries to consider mitigating evidence bearing on the defendant's moral culpability.

The third motion asked the court to disclose the mitigation instructions before jury selection. The trial court rejected Smith's constitutional challenges to the Texas special-issue scheme but agreed to provide the jury instructions:

[I]f you believe that the State has proved beyond a reasonable doubt that the answers to the Special Issues are `Yes,' and you also believe from the mitigating evidence, if any, that the Defendant should not be sentenced to death, then you shall answer at least one of the Special Issues `No' in order to give effect to your belief that the death penalty should not be imposed due to the mitigating evidence presented to you. In this regard, you are further instructed that the State of Texas must prove beyond a reasonable doubt that the death sentence should be imposed despite the mitigating evidence, if any, admitted before you.

Smith did not make any further objection to the nullification instruction and did not propose alternative language for the charge.

=== State direct review and habeas ===
On direct review, the Texas Court of Criminal Appeals upheld Smith's death sentence, concluding that the nullification instruction complied with Penry and provided the jury with an adequate means of considering any mitigating evidence Smith presented.

In 1998, Smith sought state habeas relief, and was denied. Smith filed a second state habeas petition arguing that the Texas special-issues framework remained constitutionally inadequate because it did not allow jurors to give effect to mitigating evidence, as required by Penry I. The State said the claim was procedurally barred because the same argument had been denied on direct appeal.

The Supreme Court decided Penry II while Smith's appeal was pending, but the Texas Court of Criminal Appeals still denied relief, holding that the special issues were constitutionally adequate. The Supreme Court reversed this ruling in Smith I relying on the intervening decision Tennard v. Dretke.

After the case was remanded, the Texas Court of Criminal Appeals again denied relief applying Texas's Almanza framework, the court held that Smith was required to demonstrate egregious harm rather than ordinary harm to overcome the procedural default, and denied habeas relief.

Smith appealed, and the U.S. Supreme Court granted certiorari. Smith's attorneys for the appeal included four retired federal appeals court judges. The case was argued before the Supreme Court on January 16, 2007, with UT Austin Professor Jordan Steiker appearing for Smith and Texas Solicitor General Ted Cruz appearing for the state, with Gene Schaerr appearing for the State of California as a friend of Texas.

== Supreme Court ==
The Supreme Court granted certiorari on two questions:

1. Was the Texas Court of Criminal Appeals correct in holding that the improper jury instruction was harmless error and not sufficient to invalidate his death sentence?
2. Was the Texas court correct to require a standard of "egregious harm" when evaluating whether an unconstitutional jury instruction should invalidate a death sentence?

Having resolved the second issue in Smith's favor, the Court did not address the first question.

=== Opinion of the Court ===
On April 24, 2007, the Supreme Court reversed and remanded. Justice Kennedy, writing for the 5-4 majority, held that the Texas Court "misunderstood the interplay of [previous death penalty decisions,] and it mistook which of Smith’s claims furnished the basis for this Court’s opinion in Smith I. These errors of federal law led the state court to conclude Smith had not preserved at trial the claim this Court vindicated in Smith I, even when the Court of Criminal Appeals previously had held Smith’s claim ... was preserved. The state court’s error of federal law cannot be the predicate for requiring Smith to show egregious harm."

As a general matter, and absent some important exceptions, when a state court denies relief because a party failed to comply with a regularly applied and well-established state procedural rule, a federal court will not consider that issue based on precedents such as Ford v. Georgia (1991). Smith said Almanza was not an adequate state law ground because it was not a "firmly established and regularly followed state practice" as explained in James v. Kentucky (1984). The Supreme Court did not make a decision about this because the predicate finding of procedural failure that led the Court of Criminal Appeals to apply the heightened Almanza standard was based on a misreading of federal law and therefore not an independent state law ground as explained in Ake v. Oklahoma (1985).

Because the Texas Court of Criminal Appeals procedural ruling rested on an error of federal law, it could not justify requiring Smith to demonstrate egregious harm.

=== Concurrence ===
Justice Souter issued a brief concurrence, adding only that "in some later case, we may be required to consider whether harmless error review is ever appropriate in a case with error as described in Penry v. Lynaugh. We do not and need not address that question here."

=== Dissent ===
Justice Alito dissented, stating that the issue was one of ordinary state procedure, and that Smith had indeed failed to raise any objection to the jury instruction. "Accordingly," he wrote, "I would dismiss for want of jurisdiction."

== Subsequent developments ==
In 2008, one year after Smith v. Texas was decided, the subject, LaRoyce Smith, (former death row number #999007) had his sentence commuted to life imprisonment.
