= Tellabs, Inc. v. Makor Issues & Rights, Ltd. =

Tellabs Inc. v. Makor Issues & Rights
- Supreme Court of the United States

Argued March 28, 2007 Decided June 21, 2007
- Full case name: Tellabs Incorporated v. Makor Issues & Rights
- Docket no.: 06-484
- Citations: 551 U.S. 308 (more) 127 S. Ct. 2499; 168 L. Ed. 2d 179; 2007 U.S. LEXIS 8270; 75 U.S.L.W. 4462; Fed. Sec. L. Rep. (CCH) ¶ 94,335; 20 Fla. L. Weekly Fed. S 374

Holding
- To qualify as "strong" within the intended meaning of § 21D(b)(2), an inference of scienter must be more than merely plausible or reasonable-it must be cogent and at least as compelling as any opposing inference of nonfraudulent intent.

Court membership
- Chief Justice John Roberts Associate Justices John P. Stevens · Antonin Scalia; Anthony Kennedy · David Souter; Clarence Thomas · Ruth Bader Ginsburg; Stephen Breyer · Samuel Alito

Case opinions
- Majority: Ginsburg, joined by Roberts, Kennedy, Souter, Thomas, Breyer
- Concurrence: Scalia
- Concurrence: Alito
- Dissent: Stevens

Tellabs Inc. v. Makor Issues & Rights, 551 U.S. 308 (2007), was a United States Supreme Court case in which the Court ruled on the interpretation of the Private Securities Litigation Reform Act of 1995's requirement of scienter in a civil action in apply to Tellabs and Makor Issues & Rights. The various federal circuits have taken different approaches to defining what it means, under the PSLRA, for a plaintiff to sufficiently plead a "strong inference" of scienter (a mental state embracing intent to deceive, manipulate, or defraud).

The Court held that a reasonable inference of scienter from assumed-true facts was insufficient and inconsistent with Congressional intent. Writing for the Court, Justice Ginsburg wrote that "to qualify as "strong" within the intendment of § 21D(b)(2), we hold, an inference of scienter must be more than merely plausible or reasonable - it must be cogent and at least as compelling as any opposing inference of nonfraudulent intent...the inference of scienter must be more than merely "reasonable" or "permissible"-it must be cogent and compelling, thus strong in light of other explanations. A complaint will survive, we hold, only if a reasonable person would deem the inference of scienter cogent and at least as compelling as any opposing inference one could draw from the facts alleged."

Tellabs increased the hurdle civil litigants must traverse in order to recover damages for securities fraud because it made it more difficult to demonstrate scienter (a necessary element of the claim). Instead of being able to reasonably deduce scienter from the alleged facts of the case, a claimant must also demonstrate that fraud is at least as likely as other, more-innocent explanations.

== See also ==
- List of United States Supreme Court cases, volume 551
- List of United States Supreme Court cases
