= Philip Morris USA Inc. v. Williams =

Philip Morris USA v. Williams
- Supreme Court of the United States

Argued October 31, 2006 Decided February 20, 2007
- Full case name: Philip Morris USA, Petitioner v. Mayola Williams, Personal Representative of the Estate of Jesse D. Williams, Deceased
- Docket nos.: 05-1256; 07-1216
- Citations: 549 U.S. 346 (more) 127 S. Ct. 1057; 166 L. Ed. 2d 940; 2007 U.S. LEXIS 1332; 75 U.S.L.W. 4101; CCH Prod. Liab. Rep. ¶ 17,676; 20 Fla. L. Weekly Fed. S 80

Case history
- Subsequent: On remand, 176 P.3d 1255, 344 Or. 45 (2008), cert. granted in part, 553 U.S. 1093 (2008), cert. dismissed as improvidently granted, 556 U.S. 178 (2009)

Holding
- A punitive damages award based in part on a jury’s desire to punish a defendant for harming nonparties amounts to a taking of property from the defendant without due process.

Court membership
- Chief Justice John Roberts Associate Justices John P. Stevens · Antonin Scalia; Anthony Kennedy · David Souter; Clarence Thomas · Ruth Bader Ginsburg; Stephen Breyer · Samuel Alito

Case opinions
- Majority: Breyer, joined by Roberts, Kennedy, Souter, Alito
- Dissent: Stevens
- Dissent: Thomas
- Dissent: Ginsburg, joined by Scalia, Thomas

Laws applied
- U.S. Const. amend. XIV

Philip Morris USA v. Williams, 549 U.S. 346 (2007), 556 U.S. 178 (2009), was a decision by the Supreme Court of the United States, which held that the due process clause of the Fourteenth Amendment limits punitive damages, and ordered a lower court to reconsider its damages awards on that basis.

== Trial court decision ==
Mayola Williams, the widow of Jesse D. Williams, who died of smoking-related lung cancer in 1997, sued Philip Morris USA, a cigarette manufacturer, for fraud based on Philip Morris advertisements and sponsored studies that made cigarettes seem less dangerous than they actually were. At trial in 1999, the jury found for Williams and awarded her $821,485.50 in compensatory damages and $79.5 million in punitive damages. At that time, the verdict was the largest against a tobacco company. The trial court found that the compensatory damages exceeded the state cap and the punitive damages were "grossly excessive". It reduced the respective amounts to $521,485.50 and $32 million.

== Appeals ==
On appeal, the Oregon Court of Appeals reversed and reinstated the $79.5 million judgment. Following the "guideposts" established in BMW of North America, Inc. v. Gore, the Court of Appeals examined whether the punitive damages were appropriate based on (1) the degree of reprehensibility of the conduct, (2) the disparity between the actual harm and the punitive damages, and (3) the difference between the punitive damages and civil penalties allowed in similar cases. While determining the reprehensibility of Philip Morris's actions, the court considered the length of the misinformation campaign and the number of people it had reached, concluding that its actions were so reprehensible that they justified punitive damages 97 times greater than the actual damages. The Oregon Supreme Court denied review.

The Supreme Court of the United States then granted certiorari, and in the 2007 decision vacated the Court of Appeals' judgment, remanding the case to the Oregon Court of Appeals for that court to reconsider the amount of the punitive damages award in light of State Farm v. Campbell.

== Later decisions ==
The Court of Appeals again reinstated the $79.5 million judgment. On appeal, the Oregon Supreme Court affirmed, also holding that the courts can consider evidence of similar conduct to other people in Oregon–even those not party to the lawsuit–when awarding punitive damages. Philip Morris then appealed again to the U.S. Supreme Court in 2008, arguing that the Oregon Supreme Court ignored the guidance the U.S. Supreme Court had given as to punitive damages. In March 2009, the U.S. Supreme Court in essence affirmed the lower court decision when it dismissed the case and withdrew certiorari as improvidently granted.

Philip Morris then paid Williams $61 million, as under Oregon law the state collects 60% of all punitive awards and places those funds into a compensation fund for crime victims. After Philip Morris paid Williams, it then fought the state over paying the remaining amount in punitive damages to the state, claiming that the tobacco settlement signed by Oregon in 1998 prevented Oregon from collecting. The Oregon Supreme Court again disagreed with Philip Morris in December 2011 and ruled that they had to pay the remaining punitive damages, which after interest then totaled $99 million.
