= Powerex Corp. v. Reliant Energy Services Inc. =

Powerex Corp. v. Reliant Energy Services, Inc.
- Supreme Court of the United States

Argued April 16, 2007 Decided June 18, 2007
- Full case name: Powerex Corp. v. Reliant Energy Services, Inc., et al.
- Citations: 551 U.S. 224 (more) 127 S. Ct. 2411; 168 L. Ed. 2d 112

Case history
- Prior: California v. NRG Energy Inc., 391 F.3d 1011 (9th Cir. 2004)

Holding
- Section 1447(d) bars appellate consideration of petitioner's claim that it is a foreign state for Foreign Sovereign Immunities Act of 1976 purposes.

Court membership
- Chief Justice John Roberts Associate Justices John P. Stevens · Antonin Scalia; Anthony Kennedy · David Souter; Clarence Thomas · Ruth Bader Ginsburg; Stephen Breyer · Samuel Alito

Case opinions
- Majority: Scalia, joined by Roberts, Kennedy, Souter, Thomas, Ginsburg, Alito
- Concurrence: Kennedy, joined by Alito
- Dissent: Breyer, joined by Stevens

Powerex Corp. v. Reliant Energy Services Inc., 551 U.S. 224 (2007), was a United States Supreme Court case about federal court jurisdiction and foreign sovereigns which involved BC Hydro's Powerex under the Foreign Sovereign Immunities Act of 1976 (FSIA).
