= Rita v. United States =

- Supreme Court of the United States

Argued February 20, 2007 Decided June 21, 2007
- Full case name: Victor A. Rita, Petitioner v. United States
- Docket no.: 06-5754
- Citations: 551 U.S. 338 (more) 127 S. Ct. 2456; 168 L. Ed. 2d 203

Case history
- Prior: Sentence upheld by the Fourth Circuit, 177 F. App'x 357 (4th Cir. 2006).

Holding
- Federal appellate courts may apply a presumption of reasonableness to sentences imposed under the Federal Sentencing Guidelines.

Court membership
- Chief Justice John Roberts Associate Justices John P. Stevens · Antonin Scalia; Anthony Kennedy · David Souter; Clarence Thomas · Ruth Bader Ginsburg; Stephen Breyer · Samuel Alito

Case opinions
- Majority: Breyer, joined by Roberts, Stevens, Kennedy, Ginsburg, Alito; Scalia, Thomas (Part III)
- Concurrence: Stevens, joined by Ginsburg (all but Part II)
- Concurrence: Scalia (in part), joined by Thomas
- Dissent: Souter

Laws applied
- 18 U.S.C. § 3553

Rita v. United States, 551 U.S. 338 (2007), was a United States Supreme Court case that clarified how federal courts of appeals should implement the remedy for the Sixth Amendment violation identified in United States v. Booker. In Booker, the Court held that because the Federal Sentencing Guidelines were mandatory and binding on judges in criminal cases, the Sixth Amendment required that any fact necessary to impose a sentence above the top of the authorized Guidelines range must be found by a jury beyond a reasonable doubt. The Booker remedy made the Guidelines merely advisory and commanded federal appeals courts to review criminal sentences for "reasonableness." Rita clarified that a sentence within the Guidelines range may be presumed "reasonable."

== Background ==
This case involves the crime of lying to a federal grand jury, although the particular false statements are not germane to the legal issue the Supreme Court resolved. Ultimately, Rita was tried and convicted of perjury, making false statements, and obstruction of justice. In preparation for sentencing, the U.S. Probation Office prepared a presentence report, describing "offense characteristics," "offender characteristics" (including Rita's criminal history), and other information relevant to the court's sentencing determination, framed in terms of the Federal Sentencing Guidelines. The report recommended that, under the Guidelines, the district court should impose a sentence between 33 and 41 months in prison, and that there were no grounds for the court to impose a sentence either above or below this range.

At the sentencing hearing, Rita could frame an argument for a sentence less than 33 months in one of two ways. First, he could argue within the Guidelines framework for a "departure" by showing that "his circumstances present an atypical case that falls outside the heartland to which the United States Sentencing Commission intends each individual Guideline to apply." Second, he could argue outside of the Guidelines framework that the statutory sentencing factors set forth in 18 U.S.C. § 3553(a) warranted a lower sentence, which many circuits call a "variance." Under either framework, Rita pointed to (1) the fact that he would be susceptible to retribution for being a government informant while in prison, (2) his military experience and distinguished service, and (3) his frail health, for a lower sentence. The district judge ultimately disagreed that these factors warranted leniency under either framework, and sentenced Rita to 33 months in prison.

Rita appealed to the Fourth Circuit. He argued that the 33-month sentence was unreasonable because it did not take into account his "history and characteristics" and because it was greater than necessary to effectuate the purposes of sentencing. The Fourth Circuit ruled that a sentence imposed within the properly calculated Guidelines range is presumptively reasonable, and upheld Rita's sentence. Rita asked the U.S. Supreme Court to hear the case. It agreed to do so, observing that some federal courts of appeals had adopted a presumption of reasonableness while others had rejected such a presumption.

== Majority opinion ==
Under 18 U.S.C. § 3553(a), a district court

shall impose a sentence sufficient, but not greater than necessary, to comply with the purposes set forth in paragraph (2) of this subsection. The court, in determining the particular sentence to be imposed, shall consider—

(1) the nature and circumstances of the offense and the history and characteristics of the defendant,

(2) the need for the sentence imposed—

(A) to reflect the seriousness of the offense, to promote respect for the law, and to provide just punishment for the offense;
(B) to afford adequate deterrence to criminal conduct;
(C) to protect the public from further crimes of the defendant; and
(D) to provide the defendant with needed educational or vocational training, medical care, or other correctional treatment in the most effective manner,

(3) the kinds of sentences available,

(4) the kinds of sentence and the sentencing range established for—

(A) the applicable category of offense committed by the applicable category of defendant as set forth in the guidelines—

(i) issued by the Sentencing Commission pursuant to section 994 (a)(1) of title 28, United States Code, subject to any amendments made to such guidelines by act of Congress (regardless of whether such amendments have yet to be incorporated by the Sentencing Commission into amendments issued under section 994 (p) of title 28); and
(ii) that, except as provided in section 3742 (g), are in effect on the date the defendant is sentenced; or

(B) in the case of a violation of probation or supervised release, the applicable guidelines or policy statements issued by the Sentencing Commission pursuant to section 994 (a)(3) of title 28, United States Code, taking into account any amendments made to such guidelines or policy statements by act of Congress (regardless of whether such amendments have yet to be incorporated by the Sentencing Commission into amendments issued under section 994 (p) of title 28),

(5) any pertinent policy statement—

(A) issued by the Sentencing Commission pursuant to section 994 (a)(2) of title 28, United States Code, subject to any amendments made to such policy statement by act of Congress (regardless of whether such amendments have yet to be incorporated by the Sentencing Commission into amendments issued under section 994 (p) of title 28); and
(B) that, except as provided in section 3742 (g), is in effect on the date the defendant is sentenced,

(6) the need to avoid unwarranted sentence disparities among defendants with similar records who have been found guilty of similar conduct, and

(7) the need to provide restitution to any victims of the offense.

In United States v. Booker, the Court ruled that this statute implicitly required the federal courts of appeals to review sentences for "reasonableness." This presumption is not irrebuttable, yet it "reflects the fact that, by the time an appeals court is considering a within-Guidelines sentence on review, both the sentencing judge and the Sentencing Commission will have reached the same conclusion as to the proper sentence in a particular case. That double determination significantly increases the likelihood that the sentence is a reasonable one."

The presumption also reflects the "nature of the Guidelines-writing task that Congress set for the commission and the manner in which the Commission carried out that task." Just as the sentencing judge must implement the seven statutory factors, the Sentencing Commission must write guidelines that carry out those same objectives. The Commission wrote guidelines to carry out the statutory objectives, and it continues to do so, based on empirical evidence of over 10,000 sentences imposed in federal criminal cases. Sentencing judges will, in turn set forth their reasons for the particular sentence they imposed, whether within or outside of the Guidelines range. When the judge imposes a sentence within the Guidelines range, his or her balancing of the statutory factors coincides with the Commission's. That is the source of the presumption of reasonableness.

The presumption does not create a Sixth Amendment violation because it does not require the sentencing judge to impose a sentence within the Guidelines range, even if it will ultimately have the effect of encouraging judges to impose within-Guidelines sentences more frequently. Somewhat counterintuively, because the Sixth Amendment violation occurs when a judge imposes a sentence higher than she would otherwise be able to based on "jury-determined facts standing alone," there is no Sixth Amendmdent violation because a presumption of reasonableness does not require a judge to impose a sentence above whatever would be the Guidelines range based solely on the jury's findings.

Nor may the appellate courts adopt a presumption of unreasonableness as a corollary to the presumption of reasonableness the Court has sanctioned. Finally, the fact that the Commission and the sentencing judge have agreed on the range in which the sentence should fall strongly suggests that the sentence is "sufficient, but not greater than necessary."

Although the sentencing judge must state his reasons for the sentence, that statement need not be particularly long or detailed. In Rita's case, because the arguments before the judge were "straightforward" and "conceptually simple," did not demand a full-blown opinion. Whether a lengthier opinion will be necessary becomes clear in the context of a particular case. In this way the public and the defendant will be reassured that the judicial process is transparent and worthy of trust. Here, the sentencing judge listened to both sides' arguments, considered the supporting evidence, and imposed a sentence that took into account the facts that Rita had worked in the immigration service, served in the military for 25 years, and earned 35 medals, awards, or nominations.

== Concurring opinions ==
Justice Stevens argued that in light of Rita's military service, he would have imposed a lower sentence. Yet because the reasonableness standard was in truth an abuse-of-discretion standard, he felt bound to defer to the assessment of the trial court.

Justice Scalia theorized that reasonableness review can be only procedural and not substantive. This conclusion flows from the Sixth Amendment requirement that any fact legally necessary to support a sentence must be either admitted by the defendant or found by a jury. If a sentence is upheld as substantively reasonable, it could have been the product of judicial factfinding, even if those facts yielded a sentence within a guidelines range. That holding would, in Scalia's view, violate the rule of Apprendi v. New Jersey. Since the Sixth Amendment would curtail judicial factfinding in some cases, and Congress intended for a uniform standard of review to apply, there could be no substantive review of sentences for reasonableness.

This does not mean that reasonableness review is toothless, for procedural uniformity can still yield the sentencing uniformity Congress intended. The fact that judges are required to explain their decisions will help the Commission tweak the Guidelines to achieve further uniformity in the future. These modifications will in turn give district courts less and less reason to depart from the Guidelines range, leading to greater sentencing uniformity.

== Dissenting opinion ==
Justice Souter wrote that the majority's opinion did not avoid the fundamental Sixth Amendment violation caused by judicial factfinding even though the presumption of reasonableness is merely an appellate presumption. "Without a powerful incentive to risk reversal on the sentence, a district judge faced with evidence supporting a high subrange Guidelines sentence will do the appropriate factfinding in disparagement of the jury right and will sentence within the high subrange." Because what "works on appeal determines what works at trial," the judge will be tempted in turn to perform judicial factfinding in violation of the Sixth Amendment. This meant to Souter that the purpose of sentencing and the reasonableness review were fundamentally at odds.

== See also ==
List of United States Supreme Court cases, volume 551
