= Parents Involved in Community Schools v. Seattle School District No. 1 =

- Supreme Court of the United States

Argued December 4, 2006 Decided June 28, 2007
- Full case name: Parents Involved in Community Schools, Petitioner v. Seattle School District No. 1, et al.; Crystal D. Meredith, Custodial Parent and Next Friend of Joshua Ryan McDonald v. Jefferson County Board of Education, et al.
- Docket no.: 05-908
- Citations: 551 U.S. 701 (more) 127 S. Ct. 2738; 168 L. Ed. 2d 508; 75 U.S.L.W. 4577; 20 Fla. L. Weekly Fed. S 490

Case history
- Prior: Certiorari to the United States courts of appeals for the Ninth and Sixth Circuits.

Holding
- The student assignment plan of Seattle Public Schools and Jefferson County Public Schools does not meet the narrowly tailored and compelling interest requirements for a race-based assignment plan because it is used only to achieve "racial balance." Public schools may not use race as the sole determining factor for assigning students to schools. Race-conscious objectives to achieve diverse school environment may be acceptable.

Court membership
- Chief Justice John Roberts Associate Justices John P. Stevens · Antonin Scalia; Anthony Kennedy · David Souter; Clarence Thomas · Ruth Bader Ginsburg; Stephen Breyer · Samuel Alito

Case opinions
- Majority: Roberts (Parts I, II, III–A, and III–C), joined by Scalia, Kennedy, Thomas, Alito
- Plurality: Roberts (Parts III–B and IV), joined by Scalia, Thomas, Alito
- Concurrence: Thomas
- Concurrence: Kennedy (in part and in judgment)
- Dissent: Stevens
- Dissent: Breyer, joined by Stevens, Souter, Ginsburg

Laws applied
- U.S. Const. amend. XIV

Parents Involved in Community Schools v. Seattle School District No. 1, 551 U.S. 701 (2007), also known as the PICS case, is a United States Supreme Court case which found it unconstitutional for a school district to use race as a factor in assigning students to schools in order to bring its racial composition in line with the composition of the district as a whole, unless it was remedying a prior history of de jure segregation. Chief Justice Roberts wrote in his plurality opinion that "The way to stop discrimination on the basis of race is to stop discriminating on the basis of race."

At issue were efforts for voluntary school desegregation and integration in Seattle, Washington, and Louisville, Kentucky. Both school districts voluntarily used racial classifications to achieve diversity and/or to avoid racial isolation through student assignment.

The Court recognized that seeking diversity and avoiding racial segregation in schools are compelling state interests. However, the Court struck down both school districts' assignment plans, finding that the plans were not sufficiently "narrowly tailored", a legal term that suggests that the means or method being employed (in this case, a student assignment plan based on individualized racial classifications) is closely and narrowly tied to the ends (the stated goals of achieving diversity and/or avoiding racial isolation).

The Parents Involved decision was a "split decision." The Court split 4–1–4 on key aspects of the case, with Justice Kennedy writing the swing vote opinion and agreeing with four Justices (Roberts, Scalia, Thomas, and Alito) that the programs used by Seattle and Louisville did not pass constitutional muster (because the districts failed to demonstrate that their plans were sufficiently narrowly tailored), but Kennedy also found, along with four Justices (Breyer, Stevens, Souter, and Ginsburg), that compelling interests exist in avoiding racial isolation and promoting diversity. With respect to avoiding racial isolation, Kennedy wrote, "A compelling interest exists in avoiding racial isolation, an interest that a school district, in its discretion and expertise, may choose to pursue." He went on to say, "What the government is not permitted to do, absent a showing of necessity not made here, is to classify every student on the basis of race and to assign each of them to schools based on that classification."

According to Kennedy, "The cases here were argued upon the assumption, and come to us on the premise, that the discrimination in question did not result from de jure actions." That point was challenged in Justice Breyer's dissent (joined by Stevens, Souter and Ginsberg). Justice Breyer questioned the utility "of looking simply to whether earlier school segregation was de jure or de facto in order to draw firm lines separating the constitutionally permissible from the constitutionally forbidden use of 'race-conscious' criteria." Justice Breyer noted, "No one here disputes that Louisville's segregation was de jure" and cites a 1956 memo where the Seattle School Board admitted its schools were de jure segregated as well. All of the dissenting Justices acknowledged that "the Constitution does not impose a duty to desegregate upon districts" if they have not practiced racial discrimination. However, the dissenters argued that the Constitution permits such desegregation even though it does not require it.

The 4–1–4 split makes PICS somewhat similar to the 1978 Bakke case, which held that affirmative action was unconstitutional in the case directly before the Court. Nonetheless, Bakke was used to uphold the validity of affirmative action programs that fostered diversity in higher education for a quarter of a century. To that end, in 2011, the U.S. Department of Education and U.S. Department of Justice jointly issued "Guidance on the Voluntary Use of Race to Achieve Diversity and Avoid Racial Isolation in Elementary and Secondary Schools", acknowledging the flexibility that school districts have in taking proactive steps to meet the compelling interests of promoting diversity and avoiding racial isolation within the parameters of current law.

== Background ==
=== Seattle School District ===
The Seattle School District allowed students to apply to any high school in the District. Since certain schools often became oversubscribed when too many students chose them as their first choice, the District used a system of tiebreakers to decide which students would be admitted to the popular schools. The second most important tiebreaker was a racial factor intended to maintain racial diversity. If the racial demographics of any school's student body deviated by more than a predetermined number of percentage points from those of Seattle's total student population (approximately 41% white and 59% non-white), the racial tiebreaker went into effect. At a particular school either whites or non-whites could be favored for admission depending on which race would bring the racial balance closer to the goal. No distinction was made between various categories of non-whites; Asian-Americans, Latinos, Native Americans, and African-Americans were all treated solely as "non-white" for purposes of the tiebreaker.

A non-profit group, Parents Involved in Community Schools, sued the District, arguing that the racial tiebreaker violated the Equal Protection Clause of the Fourteenth Amendment as well as the Civil Rights Act of 1964 and Washington state law. The Western District of Washington dismissed the suit, upholding the tiebreaker. On appeal, a three-judge panel the U.S. Court of Appeals for the Ninth Circuit reversed, but upon en banc rehearing the court affirmed the lower court decision.

Under the Supreme Court's precedents on racial classification in higher education, Grutter v. Bollinger and Gratz v. Bollinger, race-based classifications must be directed toward a "compelling government interest" and must be "narrowly tailored" to that interest. Applying these precedents to K-12 education, the Circuit Court found that the tiebreaker scheme was not narrowly tailored. The District then petitioned for an en banc ruling by a panel of 11 Ninth Circuit judges. The en banc panel came to the opposite conclusion and upheld the tiebreaker. The majority ruled that the District had a compelling interest in maintaining racial diversity. Applying a test from Grutter, the Circuit Court also ruled that the tiebreaker plan was narrowly tailored, because 1) the District did not employ quotas, 2) the District had considered race-neutral alternatives, 3) the plan caused no undue harm to races, and 4) the plan had an ending point.

=== Jefferson County ===
This case is the last of a trilogy of cases against Jefferson County Public Schools (JCPS), including McFarland v. Jefferson County Public Schools, and their use of race in assigning students to schools. The first case started in 1998 when five African American high school students sued JCPS to allow them to attend Central High School, a magnet school. The suit alleged that they were denied entrance because they were black. In 2000, Federal Judge John Heyburn, after finding that the JCPS school system did not need to be under a court-ordered desegregation policy, ruled that race could not be used for student assignment placement in the JCPS school system in regard to their magnet school programs. In 2004, he ruled the same for the traditional schools, but allowed the regular public schools to use race as the admission requirement. It is this part that went before the US Supreme Court as the other two cases were not appealed by JCPS.

JCPS is the 26th largest school district in the United States. Students are assigned to school based on the race makeup of each school, no less than 15%, no more than 50%. Race is defined as Black and "Other". Asian, Hispanic, White, etc. are classified as "Other". Magnet and Traditional are exempt from this ratio per the 2000 and 2003 Court Order. Louisville's population is about 58% White; 38% Black, 2% Asian, 1.3% Hispanic.

== Opinion of the Court ==
Chief Justice John Roberts wrote the opinion of the court as to Parts I, II, III-A and III-C.

Part I recounted the background of the plans of the two school boards.

Part II dismissed the respondent's attempts to argue that Parents Involved lacks standing.

- First, Seattle claimed that none of the current members of Parents Involved can claim an imminent injury. Roberts wrote: "The fact that it is possible that children of group members will not be denied admission to a school based on their race—because they choose an undersubscribed school or an oversubscribed school in which their race is an advantage—does not eliminate the injury claimed.
- Second, Seattle noted that it has ceased using the racial tiebreaker pending the outcome of this litigation. "But the district vigorously defends the constitutionality of its race-based program, and nowhere suggests that if this litigation is resolved in its favor it will not resume using race to assign students. Voluntary cessation does not moot a case or controversy unless 'subsequent events ma[ke] it absolutely clear that the allegedly wrongful behavior could not reasonably be expected to recur,'" a heavy burden that Seattle has clearly not met.

Part III A first reiterated that "when the government distributes burdens or benefits on the basis of individual racial classifications, that action is reviewed under strict scrutiny." This is because "'racial classifications are simply too pernicious to permit any but the most exact connection between justification and classification.'" In order to survive strict scrutiny analysis, "a narrowly tailored plan" must be presented in order to achieve a "compelling government interest."

Roberts noted that prior Supreme Court cases had recognized two compelling interests for the use of race.

- First, "remedying the effects of past intentional discrimination."

- But the Seattle schools had never been segregated by law; and the Kentucky schools, though previously segregated by law, had their desegregation decree dissolved by a District Court in 2000 on the finding the school district had "eliminated the vestiges associated with the former policy of segregation and its pernicious effects".

Neither school could plead this compelling interest, because "[w]e have emphasized that the harm being remedied by mandatory desegregation plans is the harm that is traceable to segregation, and that 'the Constitution is not violated by racial imbalance in the schools, without more.'"

- Second, "the interest in diversity in higher education", as upheld in Grutter v. Bollinger.

- But Roberts distinguished Grutter from this case, and argued that this case was more similar to Gratz v. Bollinger. In Grutter, the interest was student body diversity "in the context of higher education", and was not focused on race alone but encompassed "all factors that may contribute to student body diversity". The Grutter Court quoted the articulation of diversity from Regents of Univ. of Cal. v. Bakke, noting that "it is not an interest in simple ethnic diversity, in which a specified percentage of the student body is in effect guaranteed to be members of selected ethnic groups, that can justify the use of race." What was upheld in Grutter was consideration of "a far broader array of qualifications and characteristics of which racial or ethnic origin is but a single though important element." "The entire gist of the analysis in Grutter was that the admissions program at issue there focused on each applicant as an individual, and not simply as a member of a particular racial group." As the Grutter Court explained, "[t]he importance of this individualized consideration in the context of a race-conscious admissions program is paramount." The point of the narrow tailoring analysis in which the Grutter Court engaged was to ensure that the use of racial classifications was indeed part of a broader assessment of diversity, and not simply an effort to achieve racial balance, which the Court explained would be "patently unconstitutional." In the present cases, by contrast, race is not considered as part of a broader effort to achieve "exposure to widely diverse people, cultures, ideas, and viewpoints", ibid.; race, for some students, is determinative standing alone. Even when it comes to race, the plans here employ only a limited notion of diversity, viewing race exclusively in white/nonwhite terms in Seattle and black/"other" terms in Jefferson County. "The way Seattle classifies its students bears this out. Upon enrolling their child with the district, parents are required to identify their child as a member of a particular racial group. If a parent identifies more than one race on the form, "[t]he application will not be accepted and, if necessary, the enrollment service person taking the application will indicate one box."" Furthermore, Roberts wrote:

In upholding the admissions plan in Grutter ... this Court relied upon considerations unique to institutions of higher education, noting that in light of "the expansive freedoms of speech and thought associated with the university environment, universities occupy a special niche in our constitutional tradition." The Court explained that "[c]ontext matters" in applying strict scrutiny, and repeatedly noted that it was addressing the use of race "in the context of higher education." The Court in Grutter expressly articulated key limitations on its holding—defining a specific type of broad-based diversity and noting the unique context of higher education—but these limitations were largely disregarded by the lower courts in extending Grutter to uphold race-based assignments in elementary and secondary schools. The present cases are not governed by Grutter.

Part III B (joined only by a plurality of the Court) rejected the notion that racial balancing could be a compelling state interest, as to do so "would justify the imposition of racial proportionality throughout American society, contrary to our repeated recognition that "[a]t the heart of the Constitution's guarantee of equal protection lies the simple command that the Government must treat citizens as individuals, not as simply components of a racial, religious, sexual or national class." Allowing racial balancing as a compelling end in itself would "effectively assur[e] that race will always be relevant in American life, and that the 'ultimate goal' of 'eliminating entirely from governmental decisionmaking such irrelevant factors as a human being's race' will never be achieved." An interest "linked to nothing other than proportional representation of various races . . . would support indefinite use of racial classifications, employed first to obtain the appropriate mixture of racial views and then to ensure that the [program] continues to reflect that mixture."

Part III C addressed the school districts' claim that "the way in which they have employed individual racial classifications is necessary to achieve their stated ends." Roberts replied that these classifications were clearly not necessary, since they had a "minimal effect" on student assignments. He contrasted this circumstance to Grutter, where "the consideration of race was viewed as indispensable" in more than tripling minority representation at the law school—from 4 to 14.5 percent. The districts have also failed to show that they considered methods other than explicit racial classifications to achieve their stated goals. Narrow tailoring requires "serious, good faith consideration of workable race-neutral alternatives", Grutter, supra, at 339, 123 S. Ct. 2325, 156 L. Ed. 2d 304, and yet in Seattle several alternative assignment plans—many of which would not have used express racial classifications—were rejected with little or no consideration. Jefferson County has failed to present any evidence that it considered alternatives, even though the district already claims that its goals are achieved primarily through means other than the racial classifications. By contrast, Croson notes that racial classifications are permitted only "as a last resort".

Part IV (again joined only by a plurality of the Court) addressed Justice Breyer's dissent.

=== Plurality opinion by Chief Justice Roberts ===
Justice Anthony Kennedy did not join the rest of the opinion by the Chief Justice, therefore, those parts of the opinion did not command a majority. In this plurality opinion, Roberts wrote that the schools at issue contend that a racially diverse environment is beneficial for education and they submit this as the reason why they consider race alone in their school assignments. However, Roberts considers that this interest is not compelling and that the use of race for this goal is not narrowly tailored, it is instead used for racial balancing, which is unconstitutional. The schools base their numbers in demographics, therefore making this goal a means to achieve a numerical quota to achieve racial balancing. Roberts concludes that racial balancing cannot be a compelling state interest.

The Chief Justice finally concludes his opinion by answering some of the issues raised by Justice Stephen Breyer in his dissent. He writes that Justice Breyer misused and misapplied previous Supreme Court precedents in this area and that he greatly exaggerates the consequences of the decision of this case. He also chastises Justice Breyer for saying that the Court silently overruled Grutter with this case and that the method that Breyer applies to this case is that of "the ends justify the means". Roberts concludes his opinion for the plurality by saying:

The way to stop discrimination on the basis of race is to stop discriminating on the basis of race.

=== Concurrence by Justice Thomas ===
In concurrence with the majority opinion Justice Clarence Thomas restated his view, in agreement with Justice Harlan's dissent in Plessy, that the Constitution is "color-blind." For Thomas, this means that no discrimination on the basis of race is permitted by the Constitution, even for a so-called "benign" purpose (Thomas rejected the notion that there could be a purely benign purpose in his concurrence in Adarand because the benignity or malignity of race-based discrimination turns on "whose ox is being gored" or is "in the eye of the beholder"). Justice Thomas also rejected the view advanced by the dissent that these school districts were in danger of resegregation. He contended that whatever trends toward classroom racial imbalance have obtained, they were not the result of state-sanctioned segregation as in the pre-Brown era. Justice Thomas goes on to call out the dissent for adopting segregationist reasoning advanced in Brown, particularly its insistence that the Court should defer to local school board knowledge, expertise, and judgment. He also wrote about the unsettled debate concerning whether racial balance or diversity has a positive effect on educational outcomes. Justice Thomas recoils at the suggestion that black students can only learn if they are sitting next to white students. Some of the concurrence consists of social science citations and statistics showing that black students can succeed in majority black schools such as HBCUs. Justice Thomas concludes noting "If our history has taught us anything it has taught us to beware of elites bearing racial theories." In a footnote the Justice added a personal mention of Justice Breyer: "Justice Breyer's good intentions, which I do not doubt, have the shelf life of Justice Breyer's tenure." He goes on to explain that he is skeptical that school boards will always have such good intentions in their race-based decisionmaking, for, as Madison said, "if men were angels, no government would be necessary."

=== Concurrence by Justice Kennedy ===
Justice Anthony Kennedy did not join parts of the opinion of Chief Justice Roberts. In cases where an opinion or parts of an opinion do not reach a majority, the narrower opinion represents the holding, so Justice Kennedy's opinion represents parts of the holding of the case. In his concurrence, Kennedy differed with the plurality because, he found, the goal of obtaining a diverse student body is a compelling state interest.

Diversity, depending on its meaning and definition, is a compelling educational goal a school district may pursue.

Furthermore, Kennedy found that race-conscious mechanisms can be used by school districts to further the goal of diversity, a position rejected by the plurality. Kennedy argued that the government had an interest in ensuring racial equality: "The plurality opinion is too dismissive of the legitimate interest government has in ensuring all people have equal opportunity regardless of their race."

Kennedy's opinion also emphasized the risks posed by allowing for the proliferation of mechanically imposed individual race classifications of its citizens. He made it clear that "To be forced to live under a state-mandated racial label is inconsistent with the dignity of individuals in our society".

Finally, Kennedy wrote:

A compelling interest exists in avoiding racial isolation, an interest that a school district, in its discretion and expertise, may choose to pursue. Likewise, a district may consider it a compelling interest to achieve a diverse student population. Race may be one component of that diversity, but other demographic factors, plus special talents and needs, should also be considered.

Nevertheless, Kennedy found the school districts did not narrowly tailor the use of race to achieve the compelling interests in the case. Specifically, Kennedy finds that the districts could have achieved the same goal through less racially charged means.

Justice Kennedy asserts that the dissent must "brush aside two concepts of central importance" to uphold the racial classification in the case. First, Kennedy harshly faults the dissent for consciously ignoring the difference between de jure and de facto segregation. And second, Kennedy faults the dissent for ignoring the "presumptive invalidity of a State's use of racial classifications to differentiate its treatment of individuals."

=== Dissent by Justice Stevens ===
Justice John Paul Stevens wrote a sharply worded short dissent in which he accused the plurality of misusing and misapplying previous Supreme Court precedents including Brown v. Board of Education. He concluded by saying that the current Court has greatly changed and that previously:

"[I]t was...more faithful to Brown and more respectful of our precedent than it is today. It is my firm conviction that no Member of the Court that I joined in 1975 would have agreed with today's decision."

=== Dissent by Justice Breyer ===
Justice Stephen G. Breyer, in the principal dissenting opinion, dismissed Justice Kennedy's proposed alternatives to the labeling and sorting of individual students by race and, in a surprisingly emotional 20 minute speech from the bench, denounced the plurality opinion. "It is not often in the law that so few have so quickly changed so much," Justice Breyer said of the Court's decision. In the Justice's 77-page written opinion he called the ruling a "radical" step away from established law that would take from communities a critical tool used for many years in the prevention of resegregation.

== Subsequent developments ==
The opinion came less than two months before the start of the regular school year in King County and less than three weeks before the start of year-round school in the District. At a press conference the day of the opinion, Attorney for the Plaintiff Teddy Gordon stated that he would, if necessary, seek legal measures to prevent the use of the current Student Assignment Plan for the 2007–2008 school year. When questioned about the close timing, Gordon stated that all the District had to do was "push a button" to change things over to a plan compliant with the Court's ruling.

In a separate conference, JCPS Representative Pat Todd emphasized that the current assignment plan would remain in effect for the 2007–2008 school year, citing the finalization of budgets, staffing, assignments and busing as prevailing reasons for no change being logistically possible.

Over a period of several months in 2007–2008, JCPS developed a diversity plan based upon social economic and minority status (income of parents), a plan suggested by school board members Steve Imhoff and Larry Hujo in 2002. These changes conformed with the concurring opinion of Justice Kennedy. This plan is in place as of 2017.

== See also ==
- Mendez v. Westminster
- Plessy v. Ferguson
- Tape v. Hurley
- Swann v. Charlotte-Mecklenburg Board of Education
- Green v. County School Board of New Kent County
- Milliken v. Bradley
