= C&A Carbone, Inc. v. Town of Clarkstown =

- Supreme Court of the United States

Argued December 7, 1993 Decided May 16, 1994
- Full case name: C & A Carbone, Inc., et al., Petitioners v. Town of Clarkstown, New York
- Citations: 511 U.S. 383 (more) 114 S. Ct. 1677; 128 L. Ed. 2d 399

Holding
- Clarkstown's ordinance gave preference to local private industry and was thus unconstitutional under the Dormant Commerce Clause

Court membership
- Chief Justice William Rehnquist Associate Justices Harry Blackmun · John P. Stevens; Sandra Day O'Connor · Antonin Scalia; Anthony Kennedy · David Souter; Clarence Thomas · Ruth Bader Ginsburg

Case opinions
- Majority: Kennedy, joined by Stevens, Scalia, Thomas, Ginsburg
- Concurrence: O'Connor
- Dissent: Souter, joined by Rehnquist, Blackmun

Laws applied
- U.S. Const. art. I § 8 cl. 3 (Commerce Clause), Dormant Commerce Clause

C&A Carbone, Inc. v. Town of Clarkstown, New York, 511 U.S. 383 (1994), was a case before the United States Supreme Court in which the plaintiff, a private recycler with business in Clarkstown, New York, sought to ship its non-recyclable waste to cheaper waste processors out-of-state. Clarkstown opposed the move, and the company then brought suit, raising the unconstitutionality of Clarkstown's "flow control ordinance," which required solid wastes that were not recyclable or hazardous to be deposited at a particular private company's transfer facility. The ordinance involved fees that were above market rates. The Supreme Court sided with the plaintiff, concluding that Clarkstown's ordinance violated the Dormant Commerce Clause.

Furthermore, the Supreme Court held, "Discrimination against interstate commerce in favor of local business or investment is per se invalid," with a very narrow exception where the city can show, under rigorous scrutiny, that there are no other means to advance a legitimate local interest. In the case at hand, the city could have subsidized the waste disposal plant, which was at least one alternative to the discriminatory law that the city tried to use.

Justice Anthony Kennedy delivered the opinion of the Court. It was held that the ordinance: (1) regulated interstate commerce, because (a) the company's recycling center processed waste from places other than the town, including from out of state, and (b) the ordinance: (i) drove up the cost for out-of-state interests to dispose of their solid waste, and (ii) deprived out-of-state businesses of access to a local market; and (2) violated the commerce clause by depriving competitors, including out-of-state firms, of access to a local market, because: (a) the ordinance: (i) discriminated by allowing only the favored operator to process waste within the town, (ii) hoarded solid waste, and the demand to get rid of it, for the benefit of the preferred processing facility, and (iii) squelched competition in waste-processing service, and (b) the town: (i) had nondiscriminatory alternatives, such as uniform safety regulations enacted without the object to discriminate, for addressing the health and environmental problems alleged to justify the ordinance, (ii) could not justify the ordinance as a way to steer solid waste away from out-of-town disposal sites that the town might deem harmful to the environment, where to do so would extend the town's police power beyond its jurisdictional bounds, and (iii) could subsidize the facility through general taxes or municipal bonds.

Justice Sandra Day O'Connor, in an opinion concurring with the judgment of the Court, agreed with the majority that the ordinance violated the commerce clause, but rejected the view that the ordinance discriminated against interstate commerce. Instead, she believed that the ordinance was unconstitutional since it imposed an excessive burden on interstate commerce.

== See also ==
- United Haulers Assn. v. Oneida-Herkimer Solid Waste Mgmt. Auth.
- List of United States Supreme Court cases, volume 511
- List of United States Supreme Court cases
- Lists of United States Supreme Court cases by volume
- List of United States Supreme Court cases by the Rehnquist Court
