= Winegar =

Winegar (alternately spelled Wineker, Winnegar, Weniger, Wennecker or Wijngard) is a surname of Dutch or German origin. It may refer to:

== People ==
Surname

- Albert J. Winegar, American politician
- Anna Lillian Winegar (1867–1941), American painter and illustrator
- Charles E. Winegar, American soldier, member of the XII Corps during the Battle of Chancellorsville and the Battle of Gettysburg, member of the XX Corps during the Carolinas campaign
- Jessica Winegar, American author, 2007 winner of the Albert Hourani Book Award
- Joe Winegar, American Texas Tech University alumnus, member of the Saddle Tramps, designer of Bangin' Bertha
- Marvin Winegar, American baseball player, outfielder on the All-Tournament Team of the 1958 College World Series
- Mr. Winegar, fictional American character in The Fortress of Solitude (novel)
- Quentin Winegar, American seaman
- Theodore Winegar, American tennis player
- Uldrick Winegar, 18th-century Swiss immigrant (first to Württemberg, where he married; then to the USA), one of the earliest settlers of Amenia, New York, grandfather-in-law of Thomas Young, subject of Historic Marker 8 in Dutchess County, New York
- William S. Winegar, American lumber business magnate, one-time eponym of Presque Isle, Wisconsin
- William W. Winegar, American soldier, American Civil War Medal of Honor recipient

Also:

- List of Zion's Camp participants (Alvin Winegar, Samuel Winegar, and Samuel's daughter Almira were participants)

Given name

- Albion Winegar Tourgée, American soldier, lawyer, judge, novelist, and diplomat

== Places ==
United States

- Hendrik Winegar House, Historic Landmark 112 in Dutchess County, New York
- Winegar, a former name of Presque Isle, Wisconsin
- Winegar Building, Historic Landmark 7 in Kit Carson County, Colorado
- Winegar Hole Wilderness, a part of the Caribou-Targhee National Forest, Teton County, Wyoming
- Winegar Lake, a lake in Scrivner Road Conservation Area, Cole County, Missouri
- Winegars, Michigan

== Other ==
- "Down by the Winegar Works", a song published in 1925
- Grand Chute v. Winegar at Law (in List of United States Supreme Court cases, volume 82)
- Grand Chute v. Winegar in Equity (in List of United States Supreme Court cases, volume 82)
- Winegar's Market, a supplier of Associated Food Stores
