= United Building & Construction Trades Council v. Mayor and Council of Camden =

- Supreme Court of the United States

Argued November 28, 1983 Decided February 21, 1984
- Full case name: United Building & Construction Trades Council of Camden County and Vicinity v. Mayor and Council of the City of Camden, et al.
- Citations: 465 U.S. 208 (more) 104 S. Ct. 1020; 79 L. Ed. 2d 249; 1984 U.S. LEXIS 26; 52 U.S.L.W. 4187; 100 Lab. Cas. (CCH) ¶ 55,437; 33 Empl. Prac. Dec. (CCH) ¶ 34,151

Case history
- Prior: 88 N.J. 317, 443 A.2d 148 (1982); probable jurisdiction noted, 460 U.S. 1021 (1983).

Holding
- A city can pressure private employers to hire city residents, but the same exercise of power to bias private contractors against out-of-state residents may be called into account under the Privileges & Immunities clause.

Court membership
- Chief Justice Warren E. Burger Associate Justices William J. Brennan Jr. · Byron White; Thurgood Marshall · Harry Blackmun; Lewis F. Powell Jr. · William Rehnquist; John P. Stevens · Sandra Day O'Connor

Case opinions
- Majority: Rehnquist, joined by Burger, Brennan, White, Marshall, Powell, Stevens, O’Connor
- Dissent: Blackmun

Laws applied
- U.S. Const. Art. IV, § 2, cl. 1

United Building & Construction Trades Council v. Mayor and Council of Camden, 465 U.S. 208 (1984), was a case in which the Supreme Court of the United States held that a city can pressure private employers to hire city residents, but the same exercise of power to bias private contractors against out-of-state residents may be called into account under the Privileges and Immunities Clause of Article Four of the United States Constitution.

== Facts and procedural history ==
A municipal ordinance of the city of Camden, New Jersey, required at least 40% of the employees of contractors and subcontractors working on city construction projects to be Camden residents. In November 1980, the city initiated administrative procedures with the Chief Affirmative Action Officer of the New Jersey Treasury Department to gain state approval for the ordinance as an affirmative action program. When the Affirmative Action Officer approved the ordinance, the plaintiff trade union filed a notice of appeal with the Appellate Division of the New Jersey Superior Court challenging the constitutionality of the ordinance. The New Jersey Supreme Court then certified the appeal onto its own docket, in order to decide all the issues in the case.

The New Jersey Supreme Court held first that the ordinance did not violate the Dormant Commerce Clause because the city was acting as a market participant. It further held that the Privileges and Immunities Clause did not apply to the ordinance because the discrimination was based on municipal, not state, residency.

== Supreme Court ==
Justice Rehnquist, writing for the majority, held first that the fact that Camden adopted the discriminatory ordinance in its capacity as a municipality does not render it immune from review under the Privileges and Immunities Clause. Secondly, he held that even though the ordinance discriminates against New Jerseyans who are not Camden residents just as much as it discriminates against out-of-state citizens, New Jersey citizens at least have the chance to remedy the problem through the political process (the state legislature). Out-of-state residents have no such option.

Rehnquist also formulated a framework for analysis for Privileges and Immunities claims. First, the Court must decide whether the law in question burdens any of the privileges or immunities protected by the clause. Rehnquist held that an out-of-state resident's interest in employment on public works contracts was "'fundamental' to the promotion of interstate harmony" and therefore protected by the clause.

Rehnquist distinguished the Privileges and Immunities from the Dormant Commerce Clause by explaining that while the Dormant Commerce Clause is a judicially created doctrine to prevent economic protectionism, the Privileges & Immunities Clause is an actual Constitutional text to protect people’s rights. Thus, since the clauses have two distinct purposes, the “market participant” exception did not apply to the Privileges and Immunities analysis. Camden could pressure public works contractors to hire city residents without running afoul of the Dormant Commerce Clause, but this did not allow the city to escape scrutiny under the Privileges and Immunities Clause. However, Rehnquist went on to explain that the Privileges and Immunities Clause did not bar all potentially discriminatory acts by a state or political subdivision.

The city of Camden argued that its ordinance was intended to remedy its urban decay high unemployment, a decline in the city's tax base, and "middle-class flight" from the city. The city argued further that the ordinance was meant to keep a certain number of jobs within the city itself, without unduly harming those potential employees who were non-residents. Rehnquist held that even though Camden's justification of the ordinance was acceptable and that the ordinance was properly tailored to reduce the impact of the discrimination, there were inadequate findings of fact upon which to determine whether the ordinance was constitutional. He remanded the case back to the New Jersey Supreme Court.

=== Dissenting opinion ===
Justice Blackmun was the sole dissenter in the case. He rejected Rehnquist's assertion that discrimination based on municipal residence could not escape scrutiny under the Privileges and Immunities Clause because both in-state and out-of-state citizens could be equally harmed by such protectionist legislation. He also wrote that the Clause was never intended by the Framers of the Constitution to reach this type of discrimination by municipalities. Finally, he believed that out-of-state residents could benefit indirectly from the political action of in-state residents' opposition to such discriminatory measures by municipalities because some states (California and Georgia) had already passed laws prohibiting exactly the type of protectionist ordinances as the one in this case.

== Settlement ==
The Supreme Court of New Jersey further remanded the case to the trial court for additional hearings. Before those sessions were completed, the trade union and Camden city officials reached a settlement, prompting the dismissal of the case in March 1986.

== See also ==
- List of United States Supreme Court cases, volume 465
