= Electronic registration mark =

Proposed category of trademark

An electronic registration mark is a proposed category of trademark that would restrict the use of trademarked words and phrases in online advertising.

The State of Utah proposed this in response to trademark owners' claims that online advertisers have abused trademarked terms. Some online advertisers, particularly search engines, allow trademarked keywords to generate advertisements for a trademark holder’s competitors. Several corporations have sued search engines to stop this practice, claiming that it violates United States trademark law. In most of these cases, courts have ruled that traditional trademark law, as currently written, does not restrict advertisers’ ability to use trademarked terms to trigger advertisements.

The Utah Trademark Protection Act created the electronic registration mark. Under this now defunct law, trademark holders could have restricted the use of its registered trademarks to generate advertisements for products that compete directly with the trademarked product. The owner of the mark could have sought redress from two parties: The competitor that purchased the advertisement, and the website that displayed the keyword-generated advertisement. This law applied only to internet pages viewed within the State of Utah. The law had instructed the state to create a searchable database of electronic registration marks and to provide access to this database free of charge. This became Utah law in 2007 but was repealed in 2008 before implementation.

No other states have established electronic registration mark laws, and the federal government's trademark law does not clearly address how it applies to online keyword searching. Judges in France have consistently upheld rulings that French trademark law bans the sale of trademarked search terms in keyword advertising for any website viewed from within France.

== Controversy ==
Critics find several flaws with electronic registration marks. They argue that restricting the keywords that advertisers can use violates the First Amendment. Another issue concerns an advertiser’s ability to determine whether a web page is being viewed in Utah or elsewhere: Because of this ambiguity, the law may be vulnerable to Dormant Commerce Clause challenges. Critics also assert that the law worsens the quality of online search results by restricting the search results that users can view. Supporters respond that trademark law has always considered trademark infringement to be a form of theft that is not protected speech, that search engines have demonstrated that they can pinpoint Internet users’ locations, and that paid advertisements are not a core component of an Internet user's experience.
