= Reeves, Inc. v. Stake =

- Supreme Court of the United States

Argued April 16, 1980 Decided June 19, 1980
- Full case name: Reeves, Inc. v. Stake, et al.
- Citations: 447 U.S. 429 (more) 100 S. Ct. 2271; 65 L. Ed. 2d 244; 1980 U.S. LEXIS 40

Case history
- Prior: Certiorari to the United States Court of Appeals for the Eighth Circuit

Holding
- South Dakota's preferential treatment of South Dakota residents in its sale of state-produced cement is not a violation of the negative commerce clause.

Court membership
- Chief Justice Warren E. Burger Associate Justices William J. Brennan Jr. · Potter Stewart; Byron White · Thurgood Marshall; Harry Blackmun · Lewis F. Powell Jr. William Rehnquist · John P. Stevens

Case opinions
- Majority: Blackmun, joined by Burger, Stewart, Marshall, Rehnquist
- Dissent: Powell, joined by Brennan, White, Stevens

Reeves, Inc. v. Stake, 447 U.S. 429 (1980), was a United States Supreme Court case in which the Court held that individual states, when acting as producers or suppliers rather than as market regulators, may discriminate preferentially against out-of-state residents. This "market participant" doctrine is an exception to the so-called negative commerce clause, which ordinarily deems state regulations invalid where they discriminate against interstate commerce in favor of intrastate commerce for the purpose of economic protectionism.

== Background ==
In 1919, the state of South Dakota built a cement plant to deal with cement shortages that had been plaguing the state. After several years of production, however, South Dakota was producing more cement than its citizens were using, and began selling excess cement on the national market. Reeves, a ready mix concrete distribution company in Wyoming, relied on the South Dakota state-owned factory for up to 95% of its cement supplies. When South Dakota was hit by a cement shortage in 1978, the State Cement Commission directed the cement plant to first supply all South Dakota customers with cement before taking on customers from out of state. As a result, Reeves lost a substantial portion of cement supply, and filed suit against the South Dakota State Cement Commission in federal district court.

== Opinion of the Court ==
At issue was whether South Dakota's preferential treatment of South Dakota residents in its sale of state-produced cement constituted a violation of the negative commerce clause. The Court ruled that South Dakota's preferential treatment of South Dakota residents in its sale of state-produced cement was not a violation of the negative commerce clause because South Dakota was acting as a market participant.

The Supreme Court first promulgated the market participant exception to the negative commerce clause in Hughes v. Alexandria Scrap Corp., in which Maryland offered a "bounty" for destroying abandoned Maryland automobiles but effectively limited receipt of the bounty to in-state residents. There, the Supreme Court upheld the Maryland law against Commerce Clause objections because the state of Maryland was acting as a participant in the market rather than as a market regulator. “Nothing in the purposes animating the Commerce Clause prohibits a State, in the absence of congressional action, from participating in the market and exercising the right to favor its own citizens over others.” Thus, while state laws that prefer intrastate commerce to interstate commerce for economic protectionism are ordinarily invalid per se, states when acting as market participants may engage in such discrimination.

Here, South Dakota was acting as a market participant where Congress had not taken any regulatory action; thus, South Dakota could favor its citizens in the sale of state-produced cement over the citizens of other states.
