= Exxon Corp. v. Governor of Maryland =

- Supreme Court of the United States

Argued February 28, 1978 Decided June 14, 1978
- Full case name: Exxon Corp. et al. v. Governor of Maryland et al.
- Citations: 437 U.S. 117 (more) 98 S. Ct. 2207; 57 L. Ed. 2d 91

Case history
- Prior: 279 Md. 410, 370 A.2d 1102, 372 A.2d 237 (1977); probable jurisdiction noted, 434 U.S. 814 (1977).
- Subsequent: Rehearing denied, 439 U.S. 884 (1978).

Holding
- Maryland can prohibit oil producers and refiners from operating gas stations within its borders.

Court membership
- Chief Justice Warren E. Burger Associate Justices William J. Brennan Jr. · Potter Stewart; Byron White · Thurgood Marshall; Harry Blackmun · Lewis F. Powell Jr. William Rehnquist · John P. Stevens

Case opinions
- Majority: Stevens, joined by Burger, Brennan, Stewart, White, Marshall, Rehnquist
- Concur/dissent: Blackmun
- Powell took no part in the consideration or decision of the case.

Laws applied
- Due Process Clause

Exxon Corp. v. Governor of Maryland, 437 U.S. 117 (1978), was a case in which the Supreme Court of the United States upheld a Maryland law prohibiting oil producers and refiners from operating service stations within its borders. The challengers, including Exxon, claimed that the law violated the Dormant Commerce Clause. Justice Stevens wrote for the majority, which disagreed with Exxon et al.: "Since Maryland's entire gasoline supply flows in interstate commerce and since there are no local producers or refiners, such claims of disparate treatment between interstate and local commerce would be meritless." Exxon challenged the Maryland statute in Circuit Court which ruled the statute invalid. The Maryland Court of Appeals reversed the ruling.

== Background ==
Maryland found that companies controlling both the production and distribution of oil were receiving preferential treatment from oil refineries through favorable purchasing rates. To combat this type of business, Maryland passed a law that prohibited producers or refiners from operating gasoline stations in Maryland, and required producers and refiners extend temporary price cuts to the stations they supplied.

== Questions before the Court ==
(1) Does Maryland's statute prohibiting the control of both the production and distribution of oil violate the Due Process and Commerce Clauses of the Constitution?

(2) Does Maryland's statute conflict with the Robinson-Patman Act?

== The Decision of the Court ==
In a 7-1 decision in favor of the defendant, Justice Stevens wrote for the majority. The Court held that the statute passed by Maryland does not (1) discriminate against interstate dealers (2) prohibit the flow of interstate goods (3) place added cost on them (4) or distinguish between in-state or out-of-state retailers. The absence of any of these factors fully distinguishes this case from Hunt v. Washington Apple Commission. The Court held that the regulation was constitutional despite huge extraterritorial effects of the regulation, less burdensome options available to the state, and no legitimate state interest apart from a desire for cheaper oil. This case is an exception to the rules set forth in Pike v. Bruce Church, Inc.. Justice Blackmun, with the only vote in favor of Exxon, wrote the dissenting opinion for the court.

== See also ==
- List of United States Supreme Court cases, volume 437
