= United Haulers Ass'n v. Oneida-Herkimer Solid Waste Management Authority =

United Haulers Assn., Inc. v. Oneida-Herkimer Solid Waste Mgmt. Auth.
- Supreme Court of the United States

Argued January 9, 2007 Decided April 30, 2007
- Full case name: United Haulers Association, Inc., et al., Petitioners v. Oneida-Herkimer Solid Waste Management Authority, et al.
- Citations: 550 U.S. 330 (more) 127 S. Ct. 1786; 167 L. Ed. 2d 655; 2007 U.S. LEXIS 4746; 75 U.S.L.W. 4277; 64 ERC (BNA) 1129; 41 A.L.R. Fed. 2d 601; 37 ELR 20097; 20 Fla. L. Weekly Fed. S 238

Holding
- United States Court of Appeals for the Second Circuit affirmed.

Court membership
- Chief Justice John Roberts Associate Justices John P. Stevens · Antonin Scalia; Anthony Kennedy · David Souter; Clarence Thomas · Ruth Bader Ginsburg; Stephen Breyer · Samuel Alito

Case opinions
- Plurality: Roberts, joined by Souter, Ginsburg, Breyer
- Concurrence: Scalia (in part)
- Concurrence: Thomas (in judgment)
- Dissent: Alito, joined by Stevens, Kennedy

Laws applied
- Dormant Commerce Clause

United Haulers Ass'n v. Oneida-Herkimer Solid Waste Management Authority, 550 U.S. 330 (2007), was a United States Supreme Court case about interstate commerce. Chief Justice John Roberts wrote the opinion of the Court, holding that New York county ordinances forcing private waste management companies to deliver waste to a public facility did not discriminate against interstate commerce. Justice Samuel Alito wrote a dissent.

== Background ==
The plaintiff, United Haulers, a not-for-profit corporation made up of waste management companies, sued the New York counties of Oneida and Herkimer, which controlled the Oneida-Herkimer Solid Waste Management Authority, under 42 U.S.C. § 1983. United Haulers claimed that county ordinances requiring all solid wastes and recyclables generated within the two counties to be delivered to one of several waste processing facilities owned by the Authority violated the Dormant Commerce Clause.

== Procedural history ==
The district court ruled in favor of United Haulers, on the basis of the Supreme Court's holding in C&A Carbone, Inc. v. Town of Clarkstown, New York. The Second Circuit Court of Appeals reversed, reasoning that the public benefit outweighed any restriction on interstate commerce. United Haulers appealed, and the Supreme Court granted certiorari.

== Decision ==
=== Issue ===
Does an ordinance requiring delivery of all solid waste to a publicly owned and operated local facility impose a substantial burden on interstate commerce and therefore violate the Commerce Clause?

=== Opinion of the Court ===
Chief Justice Roberts, writing for the Court, held that the law did not violate the dormant commerce clause.

In Carbone v. Clarkstown, the Court struck down a similar flow control ordinance that forced haulers to deliver waste to a private processing facility. Here, the Court held that because the facilities were owned and operated by a state-created public benefit corporation, the restriction was permissible. "Disposing of trash," Roberts wrote, "has been a traditional government activity for years, and laws that favor the government in such areas— but treat every private business, whether in-state or out-of-state, exactly the same—do not discriminate against interstate commerce for purposes of the Commerce Clause." Roberts applied the balancing test from Pike v. Bruce Church, Inc. to determine that the local benefits outweigh the interstate commerce concerns, but a majority of the court did not agree that applying the balancing test was necessary.

=== Scalia's concurrence ===
Justice Scalia agreed with the Court's holding, and wrote separately to restate his opinion that "the so-called 'negative' Commerce Clause is an unjustified judicial invention, not to be expanded beyond its existing domain." Scalia also objected to the use of the Pike test.

=== Thomas's concurrence ===
Justice Thomas agreed with the Court's holding, and wrote separately to refute the majority opinion he had joined in C&A Carbone, Inc. v. Clarkstown, 511 U.S. 383 (1994) stating that, contrary to his position in Carbone, he now believes "the negative Commerce Clause has no basis in the Constitution and has proved unworkable in practice."

=== Dissent ===
Justice Alito, joined by Justices Stevens and Kennedy, dissented from the Court's holding, stating that the facts in this case did not differ enough from those in Carbone to justify the opposite result.
