= Dormant Commerce Clause =

U.S. constitutional law doctrine

The dormant Commerce Clause, or negative Commerce Clause, in American constitutional law, is a legal doctrine that courts in the United States have inferred from the Commerce Clause in Article I of the US Constitution. The primary focus of the doctrine is barring state protectionism. The dormant Commerce Clause is used to prohibit state legislation that discriminates against, or unduly burdens, interstate or international commerce. Courts first determine whether a state regulation discriminates on its face against interstate commerce or whether it has the purpose or effect of discriminating against interstate commerce. If the statute is discriminatory, the state has the burden to justify both the local benefits flowing from the statute and to show the state has no other means of advancing the legitimate local purpose.

For example, it is lawful for Michigan to require food labels that specifically identify certain animal parts, if they are present in the product, because the state law applies to food produced in Michigan as well as food imported from other states and foreign countries; the state law would violate the Commerce Clause if it applied only to imported food or if it was otherwise found to favor domestic over imported products. Likewise, California law requires milk sold to contain a certain percentage of milk solids that federal law does not require, which is allowed under the Dormant Commerce Clause doctrine because California's stricter requirements apply equally to California-produced milk and imported milk and so does not discriminate against or inappropriately burden interstate commerce.

The doctrine was initially envisioned by Chief Justice John Marshall in the 1820s.

== Origin of the doctrine ==
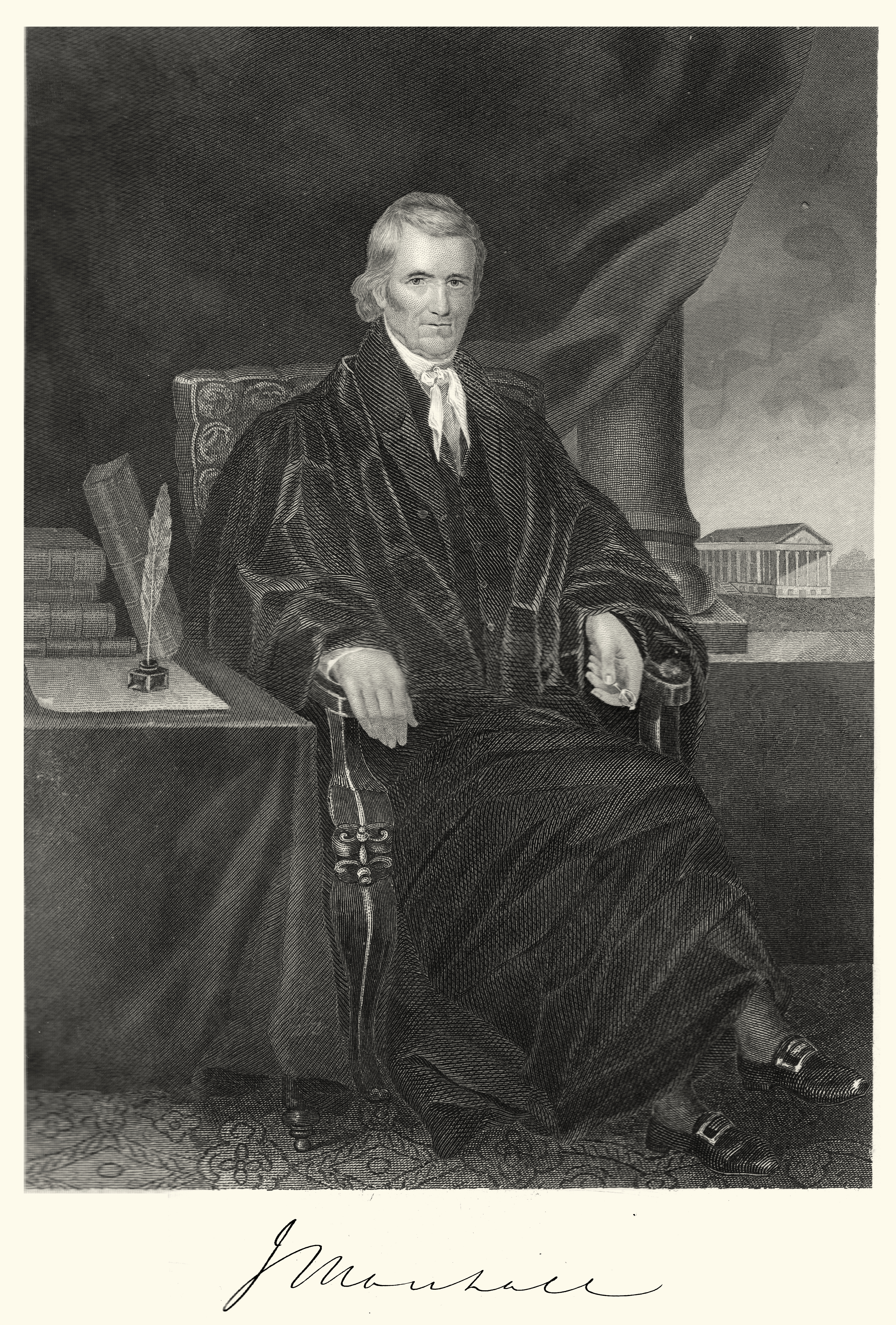
Chief Justice John Marshall first envisioned the dormant commerce clause doctrine in his 1824 opinion in Gibbons v. Ogden.

The idea that regulation of interstate commerce may to some extent be an exclusive Federal power was discussed even before adoption of the Constitution. On September 15, 1787, the Framers of the Constitution debated in Philadelphia whether to guarantee states the ability to lay duties of tonnage without Congressional interference so that the states could finance the clearing of harbors and the building of lighthouses. James Madison believed that the mere existence of the Commerce Clause would bar states from imposing any duty of tonnage: "[Madison] was more and more convinced that the regulation of Commerce was in its nature indivisible and ought to be wholly under one authority." Roger Sherman disagreed: "The power of the United States to regulate trade being supreme can control interferences of the State regulations when such interferences happen; so that there is no danger to be apprehended from a concurrent jurisdiction." Sherman saw the commerce power as similar to the tax power, the latter being one of the concurrent powers shared by the federal and state governments. Ultimately, the Philadelphia Convention decided upon the present language about duties of tonnage in Article I, Section 10, which says: "No state shall, without the consent of Congress, lay any duty of tonnage ..."

The word "dormant", in connection with the Commerce Clause, originated in dicta of Chief Justice John Marshall. For example, in the case of Gibbons v. Ogden, Marshall wrote that the power to regulate interstate commerce "can never be exercised by the people themselves, but must be placed in the hands of agents, or lie dormant." In concurrence, Justice William Johnson was even more emphatic that the Constitution is "altogether in favor of the exclusive grants to Congress of power over commerce." Later, in the case of Willson v. Black-Bird Creek Marsh Co., Marshall wrote: "We do not think that the [state] act empowering the Black Bird Creek Marsh Company to place a dam across the creek, can, under all the circumstances of the case, be considered as repugnant to the power to regulate commerce in its dormant state, or as being in conflict with any law passed on the subject."

If Marshall was suggesting that the power over interstate commerce is an exclusive federal power, the Dormant Commerce Clause doctrine eventually developed very differently: it treats regulation that does not discriminate against or unduly burden interstate commerce as a concurrent power, rather than an exclusive federal power, and it treats regulation that does so as an exclusive federal power. Thus, the modern doctrine says that congressional power over interstate commerce is somewhat exclusive but "not absolutely exclusive". The approach began in the 1851 case of Cooley v. Board of Wardens, in which Justice Benjamin R. Curtis wrote for the Court: "Either absolutely to affirm, or deny that the nature of this [commerce] power requires exclusive legislation by Congress, is to lose sight of the nature of the subjects of this power, and to assert concerning all of them, what is really applicable but to a part." The first clear holding of the Supreme Court striking down a state law under the Dormant Commerce Clause came in the 1873 case Reading Railroad Company v. Pennsylvania.

== Effect of the doctrine ==
Justice Anthony Kennedy has written that: "The central rationale for the rule against discrimination is to prohibit state or municipal laws whose object is local economic protectionism, laws that would excite those jealousies and retaliatory measures the Constitution was designed to prevent." In order to determine whether a law violates a so-called "dormant" aspect of the Commerce Clause, the court first asks whether it discriminates on its face against interstate commerce. In this context, "discrimination" simply means differential treatment of in-state and out-of-state economic interests that benefits the former and burdens the latter.

Thus, in a dormant Commerce Clause case, a court is initially concerned with whether the law facially discriminates against out-of-state actors or has the effect of favoring in-state economic interests over out-of-state interests. Discriminatory laws motivated by "simple economic protectionism" are subject to a "virtually per se rule of invalidity", which can only be overcome by a showing that the State has no other means to advance a legitimate local purpose.

On the other hand, when a law is "directed to legitimate local concerns, with effects upon interstate commerce that are only incidental", that is, where other legislative objectives are credibly advanced and there is no patent discrimination against interstate trade, the Court has adopted a much more flexible approach, the general contours of which were outlined in Pike v. Bruce Church, Inc. If the law is not outright or intentionally discriminatory or protectionist, but still has some impact on interstate commerce, the court will evaluate the law using a balancing test. The Court determines whether the interstate burden imposed by a law outweighs the local benefits. If such is the case, the law is usually deemed unconstitutional. In Pike, the Court explained that a state regulation having only "incidental" effects on interstate commerce "will be upheld unless the burden imposed on such commerce is clearly excessive in relation to the putative local benefits". When weighing burdens against benefits, a court should consider both "the nature of the local interest involved, and ... whether it could be promoted as well with a lesser impact on interstate activities". Thus regulation designed to implement public health and safety, or serve other legitimate state interests, but impact interstate commerce as an incident to that purpose, are subject to a test akin to the rational basis test, a minimum level of scrutiny. In USA Recycling, Inc. v. Town of Babylon, 66 F.3d 1272, 1281 (C.A.2 (N.Y.), 1995), the court explained:

If the state activity constitutes "regulation" of interstate commerce, then the court must proceed to a second inquiry: whether the activity regulates evenhandedly with only "incidental" effects on interstate commerce, or discriminates against interstate commerce. As we use the term here, "discrimination" simply means differential treatment of in-state and out-of-state economic interests that benefits the former and burdens the latter. The party challenging the validity of a state statute or municipal ordinance bears the burden of showing that it discriminates against, or places some burden on, interstate commerce. Hughes v. Oklahoma, 441 U.S. 322, 336, 99 S.Ct. 1727, 1736, 60 L.Ed.2d 250 (1979). If discrimination is established, the burden shifts to the state or local government to show that the local benefits of the statute outweigh its discriminatory effects, and that the state or municipality lacked a nondiscriminatory alternative that could have adequately protected the relevant local interests. If the challenging party cannot show that the statute is discriminatory, then it must demonstrate that the statute places a burden on interstate commerce that "is clearly excessive in relation to the putative local benefits."

== State taxation ==
Over the years, the Supreme Court has consistently held that the language of the Commerce Clause contains a further, negative command prohibiting certain state taxation even when Congress has failed to legislate on the subject.

More recently, in the 2015 case of Comptroller of the Treasury of Maryland v. Wynne, the Court addressed Maryland's unusual practice of taxing personal income earned in Maryland, and taxing personal income of its citizens earned outside Maryland, without any tax credit for income tax paid to other states. The Court held this sort of double-taxation to be a violation of the dormant Commerce Clause. The Court faulted Justice Antonin Scalia's criticism of the dormant Commerce Clause doctrine by saying that he failed to "explain why, under his interpretation of the Constitution, the Import-Export Clause would not lead to the same result that we reach under the dormant Commerce Clause".

Application of the dormant commerce clause to state taxation is another manifestation of the Court's holdings that the Commerce Clause prevents a State from retreating into economic isolation or jeopardizing the welfare of the Nation as a whole, as it would do if it were free to place burdens on the flow of commerce across its borders that commerce wholly within those borders would not bear. The Court's taxation decisions thus "reflected a central concern of the Framers that was an immediate reason for calling the Constitutional Convention: the conviction that in order to succeed, the new Union would have to avoid the tendencies toward economic Balkanization that had plagued relations among the Colonies and later among the States under the Articles of Confederation."

=== Formalistic approach ===
As with the Court's application of the dormant commerce clause to discriminatory regulation, the pre-New Deal Court attempted to apply a formalistic approach to state taxation alleged to interfere with interstate commerce. The history is described in Oklahoma Tax Commission v. Jefferson Lines, Inc., 514 U.S. 175 (1995):

The command has been stated more easily than its object has been attained, however, and the Court's understanding of the dormant Commerce Clause has taken some turns. In its early stages, the Court held the view that interstate commerce was wholly immune from state taxation "in any form", "even though the same amount of tax should be laid on (intrastate) commerce". This position gave way in time to a less uncompromising but formal approach, according to which, for example, the Court would invalidate a state tax levied on gross receipts from interstate commerce, or upon the "freight carried" in interstate commerce, but would allow a tax merely measured by gross receipts from interstate commerce as long as the tax was formally imposed upon franchises, or "'in lieu of all taxes upon (the taxpayer's) property,'" Dissenting from this formal approach in 1927, Justice Stone remarked that it was "too mechanical, too uncertain in its application, and too remote from actualities, to be of value."

=== Decline of formalism ===
Accompanying the revolution in approach in the Court's Congressional powers jurisprudence, the New Deal Court began to change its approach to state taxation as well. The Jefferson Lines decision continues:

In 1938, the old formalism began to give way with Justice Stone's opinion in Western Live Stock v. Bureau of Revenue, 303 U.S. 250, which examined New Mexico's franchise tax, measured by gross receipts, as applied to receipts from out-of-state advertisers in a journal produced by taxpayers in New Mexico but circulated both inside and outside the State. Although the assessment could have been sustained solely on prior precedent, Justice Stone added a dash of the pragmatism that, with a brief interlude, has since become our aspiration in this quarter of the law. ... The Court explained that "[i]t was not the purpose of the commerce clause to relieve those engaged in interstate commerce from their just share of state tax burden even though it increases the cost of doing the business."

During the transition period, some taxes were upheld based on a careful review of the actual economic impact of the tax, and other taxes were reviewed based on the kind of tax involved, whether the tax had a nefarious impact on commerce or not. Under this formalistic approach, a tax might be struck down, and then re-passed with exactly the same economic incidence, but under another name, and then withstand review.

The absurdity of this approach was made manifest in the two Railway Express cases. In the first, a tax imposed by the state of Virginia on American business concerns operating within the state was struck down because it was a business privilege tax imposed on the privilege of doing business in interstate commerce. But then, in the second, Virginia revised the wording of its statute to impose a "franchise tax" on "intangible property" in the form of "going concern" value as measured by gross receipts.

The Court upheld the reworded statute as not violative of the prohibition on privilege taxes, even though the impact of the old tax and new were essentially identical. There was no real economic difference between the statutes in Railway Express I and Railway Express II. The Court long since had recognized that interstate commerce may be made to pay its way. Yet under the Spector rule, the economic realities in Railway Express I became irrelevant. The Spector rule (against privilege taxes) had come to operate only as a rule of draftsmanship, and served only to distract the courts and parties from their inquiry into whether the challenged tax produced results forbidden by the Commerce Clause.

The death knell of formalism occurred in Complete Auto Transit, Inc v. Brady, 430 U.S. 274 (1977), which approved a Mississippi privilege tax upon a Michigan company engaged in the business of shipping automobiles to Mississippi dealers. The Court there explained:

Appellant's attack is based solely on decisions of this Court holding that a tax on the "privilege" of engaging in an activity in the State may not be applied to an activity that is part of interstate commerce. See, e. g., Spector Motor Service v. O'Connor, 340 U.S. 602 (1951); Freeman v. Hewit, 329 U.S. 249 (1946). This rule looks only to the fact that the incidence of the tax is the "privilege of doing business"; it deems irrelevant any consideration of the practical effect of the tax. The rule reflects an underlying philosophy that interstate commerce should enjoy a sort of "free trade" immunity from state taxation.

Complete Auto Transit is the last in a line of cases that gradually rejected a per se approach to state taxation challenges under the commerce clause. In overruling prior decisions which struck down privilege taxes per se, the Court noted the following, in what has become a central component of commerce clause state taxation jurisprudence:

We note again that no claim is made that the activity is not sufficiently connected to the State to justify a tax, or that the tax is not fairly related to benefits provided the taxpayer, or that the tax discriminates against interstate commerce, or that the tax is not fairly apportioned.

These four factors, nexus, relationship to benefits, discrimination, and apportionment, have come to be regarded as the four Complete Auto Transit factors applied repeatedly in subsequent cases. Complete Auto Transit must be recognized as the culmination of the Court's emerging commerce clause approach, not just in taxation, but in all of its aspects. Application of Complete Auto Transit to State taxation remains a highly technical and specialized venture, requiring the application of commerce clause principles to an understanding of specialized tax law.

== Taxation of international commerce ==
In addition to satisfying the four-prong test in Complete Auto Transit, the Supreme Court has held state taxes which burden international commerce cannot create a substantial risk of multiple taxations and must not prevent the federal government from "speaking with one voice when regulating commercial relations with foreign governments".

In Kraft Gen. Foods, Inc. v. Iowa Dept. of Revenue and Finance, 505 U.S. 71 (1992), the Supreme Court considered a case in which Iowa taxed dividends from foreign subsidiaries, without allowing a credit for taxes paid to foreign governments, but not dividends from domestic subsidiaries operating outside Iowa. This differential treatment arose from Iowa's adoption of the definition of "net income" used by the Internal Revenue Service. For federal income tax purposes, dividends from domestic subsidiaries are allowed to be exempted from the parent corporations income to avoid double taxation. The Iowa Supreme Court rejected a Commerce Clause claim because Kraft failed to show "that Iowa businesses receive a commercial advantage over foreign commerce due to Iowa's taxing scheme." Considering an Equal Protection Clause challenge, the Iowa Supreme Court held that the use of the federal government's definitions of income were convenient for the state and was "rationally related to the goal of administrative efficiency". The Supreme Court rejected the notion that administrative convenience was a sufficient defense for subjecting foreign commerce to a higher tax burden than interstate commerce. The Supreme Court held that "a State's preference for domestic commerce over foreign commerce is inconsistent with the Commerce Clause even if the State's own economy is not a direct beneficiary of the discrimination."

== Local processing requirements ==
Discrimination in the flow of interstate commerce has arisen in a variety of contexts. A line of important cases has dealt with local processing requirements. Under the local processing requirement, a municipality seeks to force the local processing of raw materials before they are shipped in interstate commerce.

=== No local processing preference ===
The basic idea of the local processing ordinance was to provide favored access to local processors of locally produced raw materials. Examples of Supreme Court decisions in this vein are set out in its Carbone decision. They include Minnesota v. Barber, 136 U.S. 313, (1890) (striking down a Minnesota statute that required any meat sold within the State, whether originating within or without the State, to be examined by an inspector within the State); Foster-Fountain Packing Co. v. Haydel, 278 U.S. 1 (1928) (striking down a Louisiana statute that forbade shrimp to be exported unless the heads and hulls had first been removed within the State); Johnson v. Haydel, 278 U.S. 16 (1928) (striking down analogous Louisiana statute for oysters); Toomer v. Witsell, 334 U.S. 385 (1948) (striking down South Carolina statute that required shrimp fishermen to unload, pack, and stamp their catch before shipping it to another State); Pike v. Bruce Church, Inc., supra (striking down Arizona statute that required all Arizona-grown cantaloupes to be packaged within the State prior to export); South-Central Timber Development, Inc. v. Wunnicke, 467 U.S. 82 (1984) (striking down an Alaska regulation that required all Alaska timber to be processed within the State prior to export). The Court has defined "protectionist" state legislation as "regulatory measures designed to benefit in-state economic interests by burdening out-of-state competitors". New Energy Co. of Indiana v. Limbach, 486 U.S. 269, 273–274 (1988).

=== Carbone: local processing law benefiting private entity ===
In the 1980s, spurred by RCRA's emphasis on comprehensive local planning, many states and municipalities sought to promote investment in more costly disposal technologies, such as waste-to-energy incinerators, state-of-the-art landfills, composting and recycling. Some states and localities sought to promote private investment in these costly technologies by guaranteeing a longterm supply of customers. For about a decade, the use of regulation to channel private commerce to designated private disposal sites was greatly restricted as the result of the Carbone decision discussed below.

Flow control laws typically came in various designs. One common theme was the decision to fund local infrastructure by guaranteeing a minimum volume of business for privately constructed landfills, incinerators, composters or other costly disposal sites. In some locales, choice of the flow control device was driven by state bonding laws, or municipal finance concerns. If a county or other municipality issued general obligation bonds for construction of a costly incinerator, for example, state laws might require a special approval process. If approval could be obtained, the bonds themselves would be counted against governmental credit limitations, or might impact the governmental body's credit rating: in either instance the ability to bond for other purposes might be impaired. But by guaranteeing customers for a privately constructed and financed facility, a private entity could issue its own bonds, privately, on the strength of the public's waste assurance.

The private character of flow control regimens can thus be explained in part by the desire to utilize particular kinds of public financing devices. It can also be explained by significant encouragement at the national level, in national legislation as well as in federal executive policy to achieve environmental objectives utilizing private resources. Ironically, these public-private efforts often took the form of local processing requirements which ultimately ran afoul of the commerce clause.

The Town of Clarkstown had decided that it wanted to promote waste assurance through a local private transfer station. The transfer station would process waste and then forward the waste to the disposal site designated by the town. The ordinance had the following features:

Waste hauling in the Town of Clarkstown was accomplished by private haulers, subject to local regulation. The scheme had the following aspects:

1. The town promoted the financing of a privately owned transfer station through a waste assurance agreement with the private company. Thus the designated facility was a private company.
2. The Town of Clarkstown forced private haulers to bring their solid waste for local processing at the designated transfer station, even if the ultimate destination of solid waste was an out-of-state disposal site.
3. The primary rationale for forcing in-state waste into the designated private transfer station was financial; it was seen as a device to raise revenue to finance the transfer station.

The Town of Clarkstown's ordinance was designed and written right in the teeth of the long line of Supreme Court cases which had historically struck down local processing requirements. In short, it was as if the authors of the ordinance had gone to a treatise on the commerce clause and intentionally chosen a device which had been traditionally prohibited. A long line of Supreme Court case law had struck down local processing requirements when applied to goods or services in interstate commerce. As the Court in Carbone wrote:

We consider a so-called flow control ordinance, which requires all solid waste to be processed at a designated transfer station before leaving the municipality. The avowed purpose of the ordinance is to retain the processing fees charged at the transfer station to amortize the cost of the facility. Because it attains this goal by depriving competitors, including out-of-state firms, of access to a local market, we hold that the flow control ordinance violates the Commerce Clause.

The Court plainly regarded the decision as a relatively unremarkable decision, not a bold stroke. As the Court wrote: "The case decided today, while perhaps a small new chapter in that course of decisions, rests nevertheless upon well-settled principles of our Commerce Clause jurisprudence." And, the Court made it plain, that the problem with Clarkstown's ordinance was that it created a local processing requirement protective of a local private processing company:

In this light, the flow control ordinance is just one more instance of local processing requirements that we long have held invalid ... The essential vice in laws of this sort is that they bar the import of the processing service. Out-of-state meat inspectors, or shrimp hullers, or milk pasteurizers, are deprived of access to local demand for their services. Put another way, the offending local laws hoard a local resource—be it meat, shrimp, or milk—for the benefit of local businesses that treat it. 511 U.S. at 392–393.

=== United Haulers: local processing law benefiting public entity ===
The Court's 2007 decision in United Haulers Association v. Oneida-Herkimer Solid Waste Management Authority starkly illustrates the difference in result when the Court finds that local regulation is not discriminatory. The Court dealt with a flow control regimen quite similar to that considered in Carbone. The "only salient difference is that the laws at issue here require haulers to bring waste to facilities owned and operated by a state-created public benefit corporation." The Court decided that the balancing test should apply, because the regulatory scheme favored the government owned facility, but treated all private facilities equally.

Compelling reasons justify treating these laws differently from laws favoring particular private businesses over their competitors. "Conceptually, of course, any notion of discrimination assumes a comparison of substantially similar entities." General Motors Corp. v. Tracy, 519 U.S. 278 (1997). But States and municipalities are not private businesses—far from it. Unlike private enterprise, government is vested with the responsibility of protecting the health, safety, and welfare of its citizens. . . . These important responsibilities set state and local government apart from a typical private business.

The Court's further explained:

By the 1980s, the Counties confronted what they could credibly call a solid waste "'crisis.'" ... Many local landfills were operating without permits and in violation of state regulations. Sixteen were ordered to close and remediate the surrounding environment, costing the public tens of millions of dollars. These environmental problems culminated in a federal clean-up action against a landfill in Oneida County; the defendants in that case named over local businesses and several municipalities and school districts as third-party defendants The "crisis" extended beyond health and safety concerns. The Counties had an uneasy relationship with local waste management companies, enduring price fixing, pervasive overcharging, and the influence of organized crime. Dramatic price hikes were not uncommon: In 1986, for example, a county contractor doubled its waste disposal rate on six weeks' notice

The Court would not interfere with local government's efforts to solve an important public and safety problem.

The contrary approach of treating public and private entities the same under the dormant Commerce Clause would lead to unprecedented and unbounded interference by the courts with state and local government. The dormant Commerce Clause is not a roving license for federal courts to decide what activities are appropriate for state and local government to undertake, and what activities must be the province of private market competition. In this case, the citizens of Oneida and Herkimer Counties have chosen the government to provide waste management services, with a limited role for the private sector in arranging for transport of waste from the curb to the public facilities. The citizens could have left the entire matter for the private sector, in which case any regulation they undertook could not discriminate against interstate commerce. But it was also open to them to vest responsibility for the matter with their government, and to adopt flow control ordinances to support the government effort. It is not the office of the Commerce Clause to control the decision of the voters on whether government or the private sector should provide waste management services. "The Commerce Clause significantly limits the ability of States and localities to regulate or otherwise burden the flow of interstate commerce, but it does not elevate free trade above all other values."

== Health and safety regulation ==
The history of commerce clause jurisprudence evidences a distinct difference in approach where the state is seeking to exercise its public health and safety powers, on the one hand, as opposed to attempting to regulate the flow of commerce. The exact dividing line between the two interests, the right of states to exercise regulatory control over their public health and safety, and the interest of the national government in unfettered interstate commerce is not always easy to discern. One Court has written as follows:

Not surprisingly, the Court's effort to preserve a national market has, on numerous occasions, come into conflict with the states' traditional power to "legislat[e] on all subjects relating to the health, life, and safety of their citizens." Huron Portland Cement Co. v. City of Detroit, 362 U.S. 440, 443 (1960). On these occasions, the Supreme Court has "struggled (to put it nicely) to develop a set of rules by which we may preserve a national market without needlessly intruding upon the States' police powers, each exercise of which no doubt has some effect on the commerce of the Nation." Camps Newfound/Owatonna v. Town of Harrison, 520 U.S. 564, 596 (1997) (Scalia, J., dissenting) (citing Okla. Tax Comm'n v. Jefferson Lines, 514 U.S. 175, 180–183 (1995)); see generally Boris I. Bittker, Regulation of Interstate and Foreign Commerce § 6.01[A], at 6–5 ("[T]he boundaries of the [State's] off-limits area are, and always have been, enveloped in a haze."). Those rules are "simply stated, if not simply applied." Camps Newfound/Owatonna, 520 U.S. at 596 (Scalia, J., dissenting).

A frequently cited example of the deference afforded to the powers of state and local government may be found in Exxon Corp. v. Maryland, 437 U.S. 117 (1978), where the State of Maryland barred producers of petroleum products from operating retail service stations in the state. "The fact that the burden of a state regulation falls on some interstate companies does not, by itself establish a claim of discrimination against interstate commerce," the Court wrote. The "Clause protects interstate market, not particular interstate firms, from prohibitive or burdensome regulations."

Similarly, in Minnesota v. Clover Leaf Creamery Co., 449 U.S. 456 (1981) the Court upheld a state law that banned nonreturnable milk containers made of plastic but permitted other nonreturnable milk containers. The Court found that the existence of a burden on out-of-state plastic industry was not 'clearly excessive' in comparison to the state's interest in promoting conservation. And the court continued:

In Exxon, the Court stressed that the Commerce Clause protects the interstate market, not particular interstate firms, from prohibitive or burdensome regulations. A nondiscriminatory regulation serving substantial state purpose is not invalid simply because it causes some business to shift from a predominantly out-of-state industry to a predominantly in-state industry. Only if the burden on interstate commerce clearly outweighs the State's legitimate purpose does such a regulation violate the commerce clause. When a state statute regarding safety matters applies equally to interstate and intrastate commerce, the courts are generally reluctant to invalidate it even if it may have some impact on interstate commerce. In Bibb v. Navajo Freight Lines 359 U.S. 520, 524 (1959), the United States Supreme Court stated: 'These safety measures carry a strong presumption of validity when challenged in court. If there are alternative ways of solving a problem, we do not sit to determine which of them is best suited to achieve a valid state objective. Policy decisions are for the state legislature, absent federal entry into the field. Unless we can conclude on the whole record that "the total effect of the law as a safety measure in reducing accidents and casualties is so slight or problematical as not to outweigh the national interest in keeping interstate commerce free from interferences which seriously impede it" we must uphold the statute.

== Exceptions ==
There are two notable exceptions to the dormant Commerce Clause doctrine that can permit state laws or actions that otherwise violate the Dormant Commerce Clause to survive court challenges.

=== Congressional authorization ===
The first exception occurs when Congress has legislated on the matter. See Western & Southern Life Ins. v. State Board of California, 451 U.S. 648 (1981). In this case the Dormant Commerce Clause is no longer "dormant" and the issue is a Commerce Clause issue, requiring a determination of whether Congress has approved, preempted, or left untouched the state law at issue.

=== Market participation exception ===
The second exception is "market participation exception". This occurs when the state is acting "in the market", like a business or customer, rather than as a "market regulator". For example, when a state is contracting for the construction of a building or selling maps to state parks, rather than passing laws governing construction or dictating the price of state park maps, it is acting "in the market". Like any other business in such cases, a state may favor or shun certain customers or suppliers.

The Supreme Court introduced the market participant doctrine in Hughes v. Alexandria Scrap Corp., 426 U.S. 794 (1976), which upheld a Maryland program that offered bounties to scrap processors to destroy abandoned automobile hulks. See also Wisconsin Dep't of Indus., Labor & Human Relations v. Gould Inc., 475 U.S. 282, 289 (1986); Reeves, Inc. v. Stake, 447 U.S. 429, 437 (1980). Because Maryland required out-of-state processors, but not in-state processors, to submit burdensome documentation to claim their bounties, the state effectively favored in-state processors over out-of-state processors. The Court held that because the state was merely attaching conditions to its expenditure of state funds, the Maryland program affected the market no differently than if Maryland were a private company bidding up the price of auto hulks. Because the state was not "regulating" the market, its economic activity was not subject to the anti-discrimination principles underlying the dormant Commerce Clause—and the state could impose different paperwork burdens on out-of-state processors. "Nothing in the purposes animating the Commerce Clause prohibits a State, in the absence of congressional action, from participating in the market and exercising the right to favor its own citizens over others."

Another important case is White v. Massachusetts Council of Constr. Employers, Inc., in which the Supreme Court held that the City of Boston could require its building contractors to hire at least fifty percent of their workforce from among Boston residents. 460 U.S. at 214–15. Because all of the employees covered by that mandate were "in a substantial if informal sense, 'working for the city,' " Boston was considered to be simply favoring its own residents through the expenditures of municipal funds. The Supreme Court stated, "when a state or local government enters the market as a participant it is not subject to the restraints of the Commerce Clause." Id. at 208. Nothing in the Constitution precludes a local government from hiring a local company precisely because it is local.

Other important cases enunciating the market participation exception principle are Reeves, Inc. v. Stake, 447 U.S. 429 (1980) and South-Central Timber Development, Inc. v. Wunnicke, 467 U.S. 82 (1984). The Reeves case outlines the market participation exception test. In this case state-run cement co-ops were allowed to make restrictive rules (e.g. rules not to sell out-of-state). Here, this government-sponsored business was acting restrictively like an individually owned business and this action was held to be constitutional. South-Central Timber is important because it limits the market exception. South-Central Timber holds that the market-participant doctrine is limited in allowing a State to impose burdens on commerce within the market in which it is a participant, but allows it to go no further. The State may not impose conditions that have a substantial regulatory effect outside of that particular market.

The "market participation exception" to the dormant Commerce Clause does not give states unlimited authority to favor local interests, because limits from other laws and Constitutional limits still apply. In United Building & Construction Trades Council v. Camden, 465 U.S. 208 (1984), the city of Camden, New Jersey had passed an ordinance requiring that at least forty percent of the employees of contractors and subcontractors on city projects be Camden residents. The Supreme Court found that while the law was not infirm because of the Dormant Commerce Clause, it violated the Privileges and Immunities Clause of Article IV of the Constitution. Justice Rehnquist's opinion distinguishes the market-participant doctrine from the privileges and immunities doctrine. Similarly, Congress has the power itself under the Commerce Clause to regulate and sanction states acting as "market participants", but it lacks power to legislate in ways that violate Article IV.

In the 21st century, the dormant Commerce Clause has been a frequent legal issue in cases arising under state laws regulating some aspects of Internet activity. Because of the interstate, and often international, nature of Internet communications, state laws addressing internet-related subjects such as spam, online sales or online pornography can often trigger Dormant Commerce Clause issues.

== Criticism of the doctrine ==
A "negative" or "dormant" component to the Commerce Clause has been the subject of scholarly discussion for many decades. Supreme Court Justices Antonin Scalia and Clarence Thomas have rejected the notion of a Dormant Commerce Clause. They believe that such a doctrine is inconsistent with an originalist interpretation of the Constitution—so much so that they believe the doctrine is a "judicial fraud".

A number of earlier Supreme Court justices also expressed dissatisfaction with the dormant Commerce Clause doctrine. For example, Chief Justice Taney said this in 1847:

If it was intended to forbid the States from making any regulations of commerce, it is difficult to account for the omission to prohibit it, when that prohibition has been so carefully and distinctly inserted in relation to other powers ... [T]he legislation of Congress and the States has conformed to this construction from the foundation of the government ... The decisions of this court will also, in my opinion, when carefully examined, be found to sanction the construction I am maintaining.

However, that statement by Taney in 1847 was before the doctrine morphed in the 1851 case of Cooley v. Board of Wardens, in which Justice Benjamin R. Curtis wrote for the Court that the Commerce Clause does not always require "exclusive legislation by Congress".

== Puerto Rico ==
In Trailer Marine Transport Corp. v. Rivera Vázquez, 977 F.2d 1, 7–8 (1st Cir. 1992), the First Circuit held that the dormant Commerce Clause applies to Puerto Rico.

== See also ==
- Commerce Clause
- Section 2 of the Twenty-first Amendment to the United States Constitution, for Court rulings discussing possible Commerce Clause implications.
- Free movement of goods, an analogous European Union doctrine, which provides that Member States may not create obstacles to trade within the EU

== Bibliography ==
- Carrubba, C.; Rogers, James R. (2003). "National Judicial Power and the Dormant Commerce Clause". Journal of Law, Economics, and Organization. 19 (2): 543–570. doi:10.1093/jleo/ewg020.
- Eule, Julian N. (1982). "Laying the Dormant Commerce Clause to Rest". Yale Law Journal. 91 (3): 425–485. doi:10.2307/795926. JSTOR 795926.
- Redish, Martin H.; Nugent, Shane V. (1987). "The Dormant Commerce Clause and the Constitutional Balance of Federalism". Duke Law Journal. 1987 (4): 569–617. doi:10.2307/1372524. JSTOR 1372524.
