= Regulatory haven =

A regulatory haven is jurisdictions that have light financial regulation system. They often associated with having more lenient tax regulation which allows them to function as a tax haven, and for having financial secrecy. Regulatory havens can be a state, country, or territory which maintains a system of financial secrecy and little or no financial regulation. Some of the countries that are considered to be regulatory havens include Cayman Islands, British Virgin Islands, Singapore and Hong Kong. They are used by some financial firms to avoid strict financial regulation and is a form of regulatory arbitrage.

It has been argued that the existence of regulatory havens has consequences, including increased inequality of income redistribution and systemic risk of financial markets in countries that operate well developed financial regulations, while benefiting those jurisdictions that operate as regulatory havens by attracting business activity and economic development.

== Characteristics ==
Regulatory havens are used by market participants in order to maximize their profit to exploit regulatory gaps. They take even more market risk that is, due to existence of the gap, not detected in a timely manner or is simply ignored by the regulatory agencies even if it is noticed. Companies that try to maximize their profits in this way often take advantage of regulatory havens. Regulatory havens can be defined as jurisdictions that have light financial regulation system as well as lax tax regulation. Also, regulatory haven poses less strict reporting requirements and trading restrictions. Those mostly include low minimum capital required and opacity of the owners to conduct a business in a country that is considered to be regulatory haven. Some of the countries that are considered to be regulatory havens include Caymans, Singapore and Hong Kong. Regulatory havens can most easily be characterized as jurisdictions that have different tax system that is usually suitable for companies trying to use regulatory gaps to increase their profit and as jurisdictions that apply stricter confidentiality rules compared to the country where the company that uses such haven is placed (Morriss, Henson, 2013). Besides that regulatory havens, also often called offshore financial centers, can be characterized as follows:

- Jurisdictions that incorporate big number of various financial institutions that mostly conduct business with non-residential business subjects,
- Financial systems that are in possession of external assets and liabilities that are not proportional to the domestic financial intermediation and are primarily designed to support domestic economy and economic growth,
- Systems that offer multiple financial services to nonresidential business partners. Some of those services may include low or no taxation, light financial regulation as well as bank secret and anonymity.

== Components ==
As a financial system, regulatory haven can be divided in two components that include:

- Financial services. Financial services of regulatory havens are services provided and billed to nonresidential companies outside their domestic territory. These services may include some of the following: service fees for intermediaries, foreign exchange, financial leasing, commissions, trading in securities and other financial instruments, services in the context of asset management etc.
- Registration fees that are obligation for licensed entities such as offshore banks, international companies, insurance companies, trusts etc.

== Consequences ==
The concept of regulatory haven is often linked to the concept of tax haven. Tax haven can be defined as jurisdiction that requires low or no taxation and is characterized by strict banking secret. The information regarding taxes is not the subject of exchange with other countries, but if they are the achievement of restrictive conditions is required. Tax haven primarily ensures to nonresidential subjects and companies to avoid paying higher taxes in their domestic territory. Disregarding the motivation for a company to establish business relationships within the jurisdictions that are classified as regulatory havens, that can include no tax obligation, banking secret or low regulatory requirements, and no matter the activity undertaken, the establishment of regulatory haven can be attributed to the effort to specialize the economy of a country in some type of business activity, for example export of financial services. This type of specialization most commonly attributes the need to generate revenues that in some countries represents majority of realized national income. According to previously stated the main motivation to establish regulatory haven is to support domestic economy through business conducted with nonresidential companies by offering them better financial conditions for their business. That can also have negative consequences in the legal sense by enabling:

- Tax evasion which is a type of criminal behavior that includes deliberate concealment of full income, i. e. full amount of taxable income which is punishable by law in forms of fines and imprisonment.
- Tax avoidance that is a type of avoidance of paying full tax amount by using legal gaps, i. e. structures that enable reducing of one’s tax liability but in the limit that are “allowed” by law and tax regulations. The example of tax avoidance in the context of international company is partial relocation of assets within the jurisdiction that has lax regulations which is considered to be regulatory haven.
- Financial regulation avoidance that is considered to be avoidance of compliance with existing financial regulations, mostly in tax havens.

The direct consequence of regulatory havens is increasing of inequality of income redistribution. Since the higher incomes are mobile, regulatory havens protect those society members that earn more and enable them to increase their net profit due to lower tax base in regulatory haven. Consequently, society members that earn less pay more in taxes compared to wealthy individuals that use regulatory havens since they can be called upon their debts more reliably. Also, is contributes to social inequality since smaller producers face paying higher taxes even though they work more and usually work in worse working conditions. Regulatory havens enable the concealment of income and that is one of its main attractions compared to non-haven states.

== Reactions ==
Since regulatory havens have impact of financial system, the necessity to develop control reactions has become mandatory. There are two possible directions that could be taken in order to regulate those jurisdictions that are considered to be regulatory havens. Those include the following:

- Unilateral measures that require the participation of state. Taking the state involvement into consideration, the unilateral measures include lifting of banking secret, financial transparency of outland jurisdictions, transfer prices adjustment, declaration of more strict regulatory requirements and additional measures such as reversed onus of proof.
- Multilateral measures include tax harmonization, transparency of information and control of electronic communication between banks and other financial institutions.
