= Reading Railroad Co. v. Pennsylvania =

- Supreme Court of the United States

Decided December 1, 1872
- Full case name: Reading Railroad Company v. Pennsylvania
- Citations: 82 U.S. 232 (more) 21 L.Ed. 146; 15 Wall. 232

Court membership
- Chief Justice Salmon P. Chase Associate Justices Nathan Clifford · Noah H. Swayne; Samuel F. Miller · David Davis; Stephen J. Field · William Strong; Joseph P. Bradley

Case opinions
- Majority: Strong, joined by Chase, Nelson, Clifford, Miller, Field, Bradley
- Dissent: Swayne, joined by Davis

Laws applied
- Commerce Clause, Dormant Commerce Clause

Reading Railroad Co. v. Pennsylvania, 82 U.S. (15 Wall.) 232 (1872), often known as the State Freight Tax Case, is a U.S. Supreme Court decision that ruled that the state of Pennsylvania violated the U.S. Constitution by imposing unjust taxes on interstate commerce.

The case was brought by Reading Railroad Co., which challenged Pennsylvania's Act of August 25, 1864, also referred to as 'An act to provide additional revenue for the use of the Commonwealth'. The act was established to provide additional revenue for the Commonwealth of Pennsylvania after the American Civil War. It imposed systematic taxes on transportation companies, based on freight weight, for municipal purposes. All freight transported within Pennsylvania was subject to this tax.

Reading Railroad Co. argued that the tax burdened its ability to operate within the state of Pennsylvania, and thus interfered with interstate commerce. They contended that railroad companies operating across state lines were discriminated against by being taxed heavier than local businesses for goods transported through Pennsylvania but delivered to other states.

The Supreme Court ruled that the tax violated the Commerce Clause, found in Article 1, Section 8, Clause 3 of U.S. Constitution, which grants Congress the power to regulate commerce between states and foreign nations to promote free trade. The decision specifically connects to the Dormant Commerce Clause, as Congress can prohibit states from enacting laws that discriminate against or unduly burden interstate commerce, regardless of prior federal legislation.

== Background ==
=== American Civil War ===
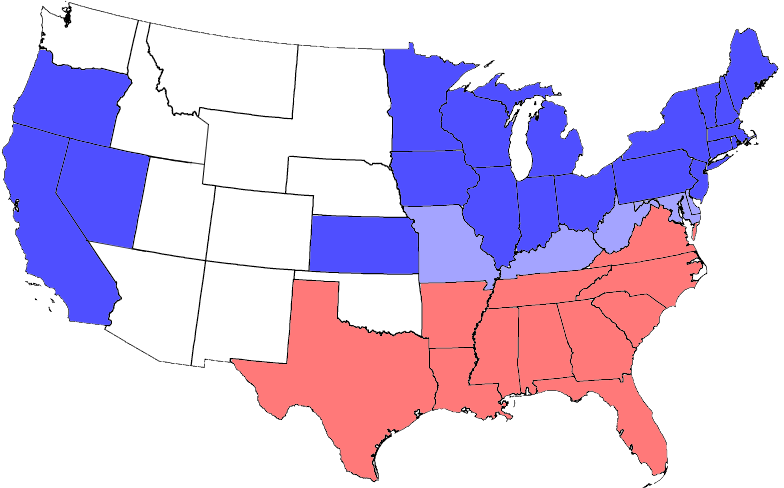
Complete map of the states in the Civil War (including states that joined after 1861). Blue represents Union states, red represents Confederate states, and white represents territories. Purple represents southern border states with economic ties to the Union.

==== Overview ====
The American Civil War, fought between 1861 and 1865, stemmed from growing tensions between the northern Union states and the southern Confederate states. Following the onset of the Industrial Revolution, the North's economy became powered by industrialization, focusing on large-scale manufacturing. Meanwhile, the South's economy relied on agriculture, particularly the production of cotton and tobacco. Southern state governments established slavery to support large-scale farming, which discouraged any push toward industrial development. This system deepened the economic and social divide between the regions, particularly around the debate over free-market labor versus slave labor.

Following the presidential election of unionist, Abraham Lincoln, southern leaders feared the abolition of slavery and tensions heightened. The South then formed the Confederate States of America, in attempt to secede from the other states. While the South sought independence, the North aimed to preserve the union of the country, ultimately leading to the outbreak of war. The war lasted for approximately four years until the Confederacy surrendered.

==== Pennsylvania's involvement ====
Pennsylvania played a crucial role in American industrialization before the Civil War. The state's rich deposits of coal, iron, and other raw materials were essential for powering machinery. Pennsylvania's foundries alone produced nearly 270,000 tons of iron in 1860, showcasing its significance to the North. To support the extensive manufacturing industry, the North required a railroad system to facilitate the transportation of raw materials, finished goods, and large machinery.

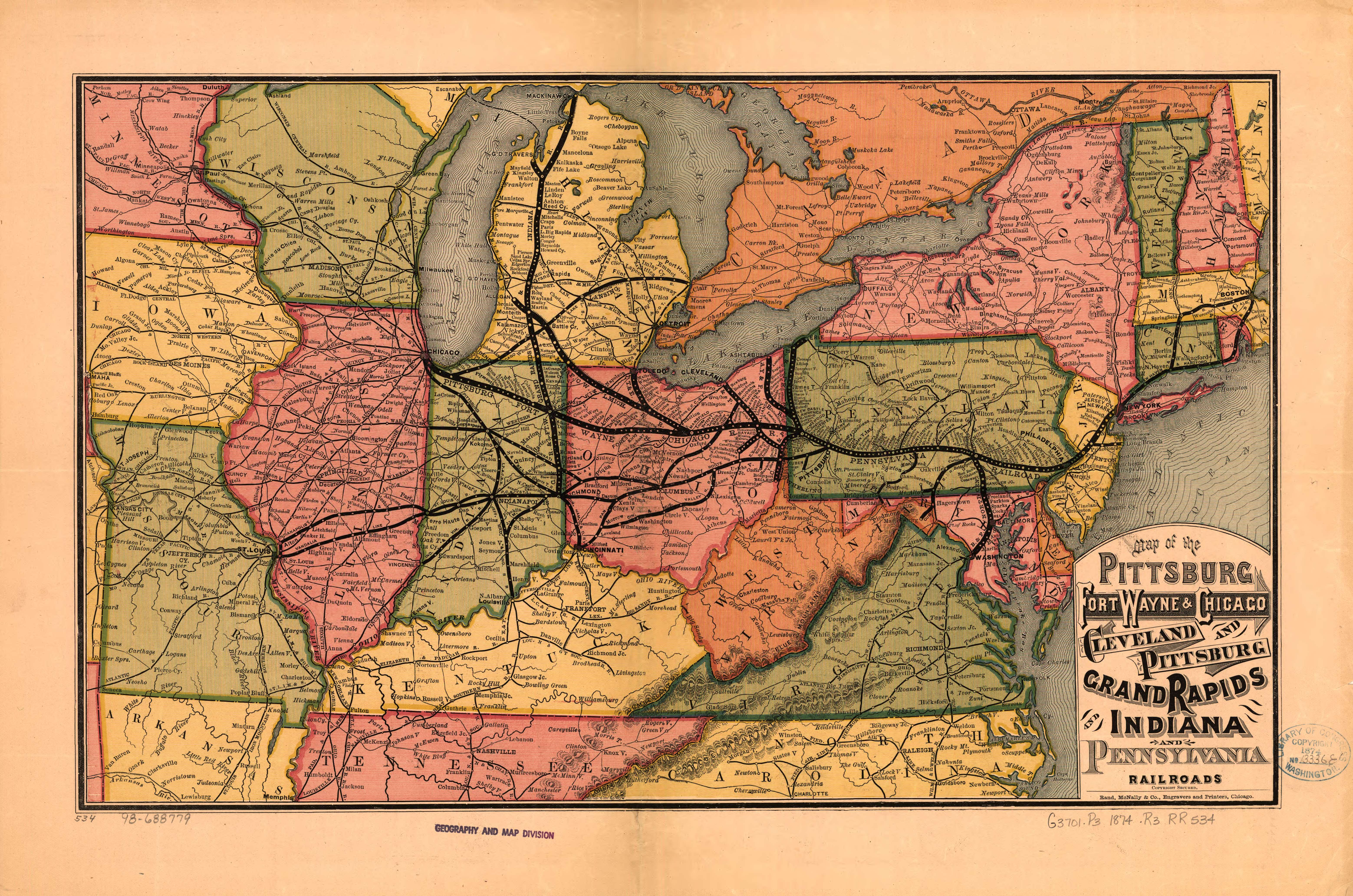
Historical map of early railroad lines emerging from Pennsylvania.

During the Civil War, the Union took full advantage of its extensive railroad system. Union General William Tecumseh Sherman skillfully used these rail lines to deliver fresh supplies and soldiers to the battlefields. Notably, ever battle fought east of the Mississippi River occurred within twenty miles of a railroad.

One of the most significant Civil War battles was the Battle of Gettysburg, which took place in Gettysburg, Pennsylvania. This battle not only resulted in the highest number of war casualties, but is also regarded as the turning point of the war in favor of the Union. Pennsylvania's railroads played a crucial role in supplying this battle, which placed a financial burden on the state. The costs of rebuilding devastated battlefields and the economic losses from decreased wartime manufacturing created lasting challenges for Pennsylvania’s economy.

=== Financial implications of the Civil War ===
On August 25, 1864, the Legislature of Pennsylvania passed 'An act to provide additional revenue for the use of the Commonwealth'. The act imposed a tax on all freight transported within the state of Pennsylvania and was included in a plan to raise revenue for the Commonwealth after the Civil War. The companies affected by this tax included railroad, steamboat, canal, and slackwater navigation companies. These companies were specifically taxed because they were involved in the state's main industry.

The companies would receive a tax that varied in price depending on the weight and product type of their freight. For every ton of freight carried by mines, quarries, and clay beds, companies would pay a 2-cent tax. For freight with hewn timber, animal food, agricultural products, and forest products, companies would pay a 3-cent tax. For all other products and freight not listed, companies would pay a 5-cent tax. The act also specifies that toll companies that charge other businesses for the use of their transportation lines could add the freight tax to their tolls if the freight had not already been taxed by the state. The regulations were as follows:

Where the same freight shall be carried over and upon different but continuous lines, said freight shall be chargeable with tax as if it had been carried but upon one line, and the whole tax shall be paid by such one of said companies as the State treasurer may select and notify thereof. Corporations whose lines of improvements are used by others for the transportation of freight, and whose only earnings arise from tolls charged for such use, are authorized to add the tax hereby imposed to said tolls and collect the same therewith, but in no case shall tax be twice charged on the same freight carried on or over the same line of improvements: Provided, That every company now or hereafter incorporated by this Commonwealth, whose line extends into any other State, and every corporation, company, or individual of any other State, holding and enjoying any franchises, property, or privileges whatever in this State, by virtue of the laws thereof, shall make returns of freight and pay for the freight carried over, through, and upon that portion of their lines within this State, as if the whole of their respective lines were in this State.

The act indicates that the tax is not intended to be a burden on the franchise of transportation companies or their property. Instead, it is specifically imposed on the freight itself. This means that the tax amount remains constant, regardless of the distance the freight travels. This structure implies that companies operating on connected lines can transport freight without incurring a great tax liability.

The act further indicates that companies that operate across state lines and transport freight through Pennsylvania must report and pay taxes on the freight as if their entire operations are based in the state. This increases the overall tax liabilities for these companies, particularly because they often handle larger freight volumes. They are also more likely to switch lines and use tolls if they don't have well-established property in the state.

== Reading Railroad Co.'s argument ==
=== Overview ===
Pennsylvania's manufacturing industry relied on railroads for the transportation of coal. Notably, Reading Railroad Co. did not carry goods of its own because it served as a freight transportation company. They carried coal from the mountains of Pennsylvania to Port Richmond outside of Philadelphia, Pennsylvania. They also carried coal to the Schuylkill Canal. Both destinations primarily exported the coal to other states.

On October 25, 1866, the accounting officers of Pennsylvania delivered a financial account to Reading Railroad Co. for a tax on their freight tonnage. This account accumulated charges over three consecutive quarters. The charges were as follows:

- For freight transported to points within Pennsylvania: $38,361
- For freight transported outside of the state: $46,520

=== Argument ===
Reading Railroad Co. refused to pay the $46,520 portion of the tax because they believed Pennsylvania's Act of August 25, 1864 only had the authority to tax freight transported and delivered within Pennsylvania. They argued that the latter tax imposed unconstitutional regulations on interstate commerce.

== Lower courts ==
=== Court of Common Pleas ===
The case was first brought to the Court of Common Pleas in Dauphin County, Pennsylvania. The jury found that the goods were originally intended for export beyond Pennsylvania state lines and were instructed by Judge Pearson to rule in favor of Reading Railroad Co.. Judge Pearson's ruling was consistent with his rulings in previous cases and he believed that such rulings were not argued in higher courts. He also noted that then Attorney-General of Pennsylvania, W.M. Meredith, agreed with his decision.

=== Supreme Court of Pennsylvania ===
Despite Judge Pearson's ruling, a writ of error was filed to the Supreme Court of Pennsylvania by the Commonwealth of Pennsylvania. They argued that the jury had been misled into ruling in favor of Reading Railroad Co. The Court of Common Pleas acknowledged that in cases of doubt, they believed the state law should prevail, leaving any correction of errors to the federal judiciary.

The Chief Justice of the Supreme Court of Pennsylvania found that the state's tax did not infringe on interstate commerce and was not discriminatory. His arguments were as follows:

1. Products transported within the state or across state lines all paid the same freight charge. This means that the tax was not discriminatory towards Reading Railroad Co. because there were no extra costs based on where the products came from or where they were going to.
2. The tax was not meant to regulate trade or set rules on commerce but was simply a revenue-raising measure. The precedent set in Brown v. Maryland was referenced to contrast how the tax was not regulatory.

The Chief Justice agreed that imposing unfair taxes on specific groups would be discriminatory and could harm trade. However, he emphasized that this did not apply to businesses and individuals using infrastructure like railways, canals, and roads without paying taxes, as they benefited from these resources. It was argued that who share these infrastructures should share the costs of its usage and maintenance. Ultimately, the Supreme Court of Pennsylvania ruled that the Commonwealth of Pennsylvania had the legislative power to impose taxes to upkeep its infrastructure.

== Supreme Court decision ==
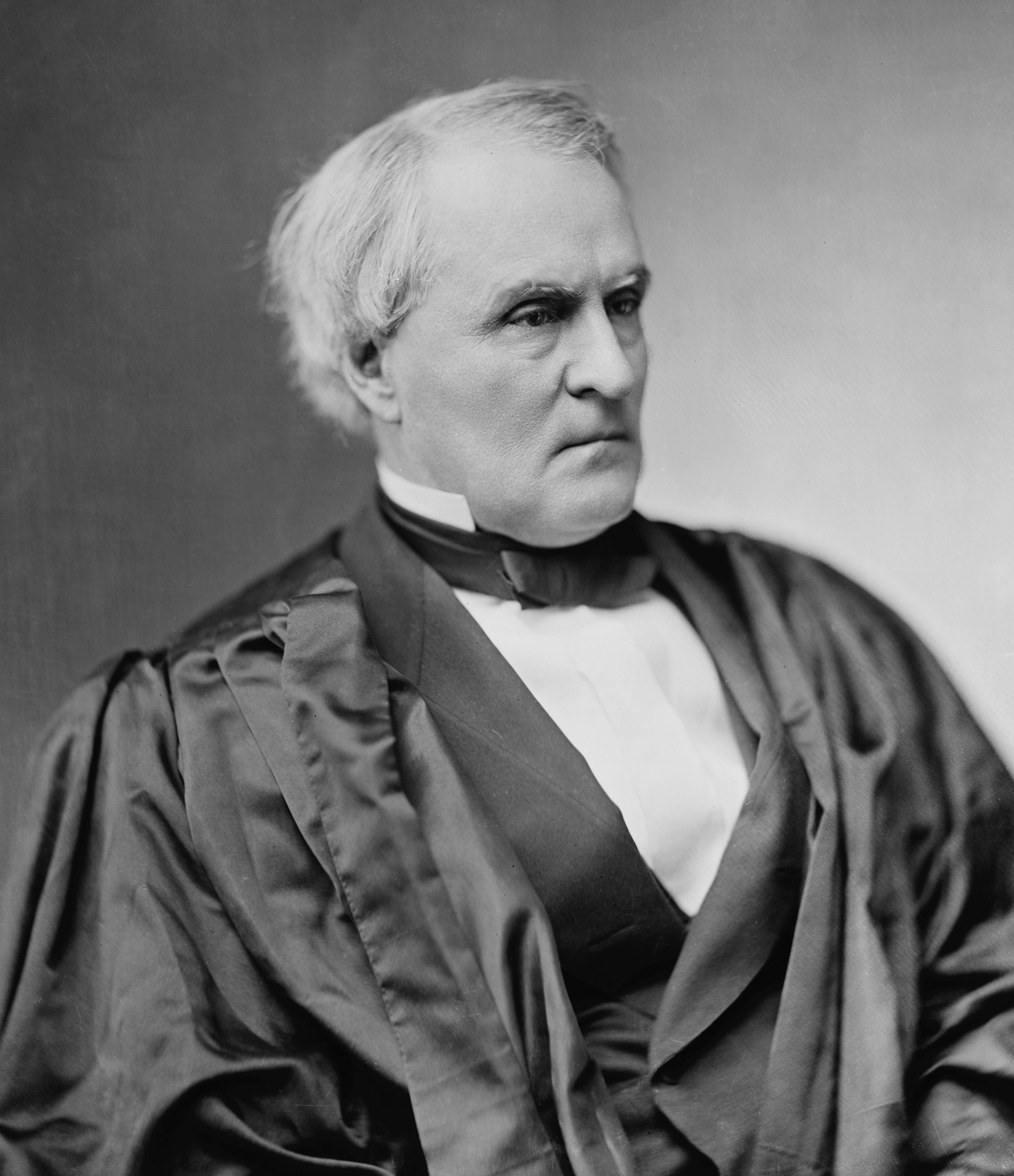
Justice William Strong, the author of the majority opinion in Reading Railroad Co. v. Pennsylvania.

=== Opinion of the Court ===
Reading Railroad Co. appealed to the U.S. Supreme Court after losing in the Pennsylvania Supreme Court. During the December 1872 term, the Supreme Court issued a decision in favor of Reading Railroad Co., declaring Pennsylvania's Act of August 25, 1864 unconstitutional for imposing a tax on freight. Justice William Strong authored the majority opinion of the Court.

In reaching the decision, the Court applied the Dormant Commerce Clause, interpreted by the Commerce Clause of the U.S. Constitution. Strong stated:

[The decision] calls upon us to trace the line, always difficult to be traced, between the limits of State sovereignty in imposing taxation, and the power and duty of the Federal government to protect and regulate interstate commerce. While, upon the one hand, it is of the utmost importance that the States should possess the power to raise revenue for all the purposes of a State government, by any means, and in any manner not inconsistent with the powers which the people of the States have conferred upon the General Government, it is equally important that the domain of the latter should be preserved free from invasion, and that no State legislation should be sustained which defeats the avowed purposes of the Federal Constitution, or which assumes to regulate, or control subjects committed by that Constitution exclusively to the regulation of Congress.

==== Dormant Commerce Clause ====
By applying the Dormant Commerce Clause, the Court believed that allowing Pennsylvania to tax freight could lead to burdensome restrictions on interstate commerce. The Court expressed its concerns about the impact of such taxes:

And as there is no limit to the rate of taxation [Pennsylvania] may impose, if she can tax at all, it is obvious the condition may be made so onerous that an interchange of commodities with other States would be rendered impossible. The same power that may impose a tax of two cents per ton upon coal carried out of the State, may impose one of five dollars. Such an imposition, whether large or small, is a restraint of the privilege or right to have the subjects of commerce pass freely from one State to another without being obstructed by the intervention of State lines.

The Court argued that permitting Pennsylvania to impose such a tax could result in an excessive amount of regulations that would hinder trade, undermining the U.S Constitution’s intent to create a unified economic system. It expressed concerns that this tax could disrupt market competition by disadvantaging out-of-state businesses. In line with the established principle in Cooley v. Board of Wardens, that states cannot directly tax interstate commerce, the Court ultimately declared the tax unconstitutional to protect the integrity of commercial activities crossing state lines.

The Court also accounted for the fact that the state did not own its transportation infrastructure, as misinterpreted by the Supreme Court of Pennsylvania. It noted that the tax did not serve as compensation for using state-owned infrastructure, as Pennsylvania did not own its railroads or canals. The Court distinguished between a tax and a toll, as a tax is a sovereign demand and a toll is a fee for services or infrastructure. Ultimately, the Supreme Court concluded that the state was overstepping its authority, as the tax was imposed on freight rather than the transportation services themselves.

==== Dissent ====
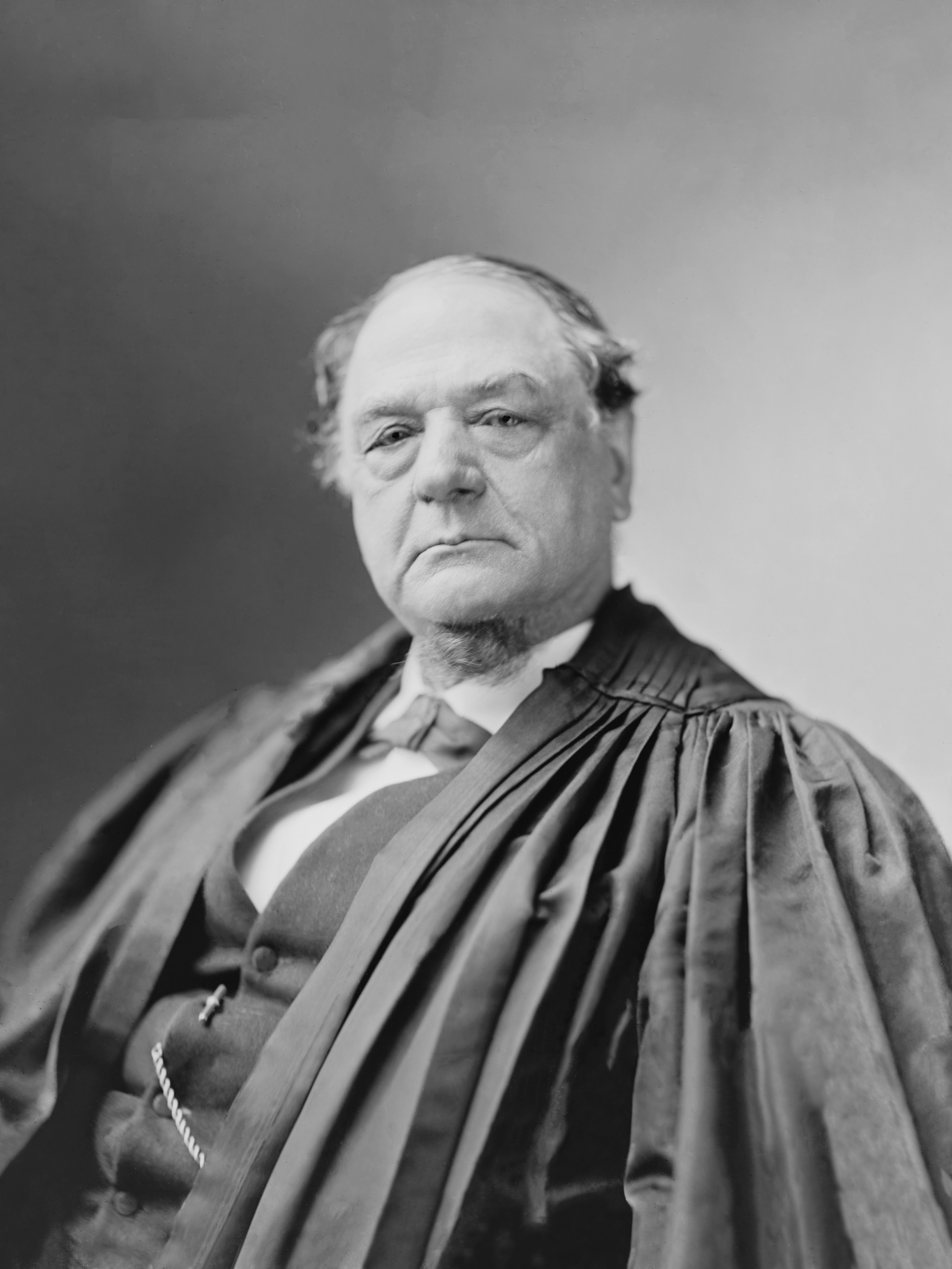
Justice Noah H. Swayne, a dissenter of Reading Railroad Co. v. Pennsylvania.

Justice Noah H. Swayne dissented from the Court's decision. Swayne interpreted that the tax was levied on businesses instead of freight:

I dissent from the opinion just read. In my judgment, the tax is imposed upon the business of those required to pay it. The tonnage is only the mode of ascertaining the extent of the business. That no discrimination is made between freight carried wholly within the State, and that brought into or carried through or out of it, sets this, as I think, in a clear light, and is conclusive on the subject.

Swayne argued that the tax was imposed on businesses instead of freight weight, as tonnage was used as a measurement in determining the amount of business being done. He further argued that the tax was enforced uniformly as the price per ton did not differentiate between freight transported locally and freight transported across state lines.

== Free market and tax challenges ==
=== Goals of the free market ===
The concept of U.S. commerce was first discussed in The Federalist Papers, a collection of documents written to promote the ratification of the U.S. Constitution. Alexander Hamilton authored Federalist No. 11, which argued for a strong federal government to regulate commerce and establish a Navy to ensure the economic prosperity of the nation. As European nations grew concerned about America's increased involvement in maritime trade, Hamilton warned that these nations may exploit individual states to monopolize the profits of their trade and limit their access to goods. Subsequently, Hamilton advocated for a unified approach to commerce that would implement consistent trade regulations across all states. This was intended to create a situation where foreign nations would compete against each other to gain access to American markets, ultimately establishing a free market.

Economic theories have emerged around the principles of the free market. The free market aims to enhance consumer opportunities by allowing unrestricted trade, offering consumers the widest possible range of goods and services. In this system, Pareto efficiency illustrates the point in a competitive market in which all markets are in equilibrium and resources are allocated so that it is impossible to make one party better off without making another party worse off. In the context of commerce, any interference can disrupt the perfectly competitive market by changing the optimal resource allocation.

=== Tax challenges ===
State taxes pose prominent challenges to the free market as taxes on goods between local and out-of-state businesses can be marginally unequal. In Reading Railroad Co. v. Pennsylvania, the plaintiff argued that Pennsylvania's Act of August 25, 1864, placed them at a competitive disadvantage because local businesses were not subjected to the same tax burden. The Supreme Court found that the tax could create distortions in the market, leading to inefficient resource allocation if Reading Railroad Co. was no longer able to operate to the best of its ability. The decision aimed to promote an environment more conducive to Pareto efficiency across state lines. However, the dissent argues the facial neutrality of the tax, claiming that the tax was not discriminatory nor marginally unequal.
