= Charles E. Winegar =

Charles E. Winegar commanded an artillery battery in the Union service during the American Civil War.

== Early in the War ==
Battery M, 1st New York Light Artillery was organized at Lockport, New York, in September 1861, and mustered in at Rochester, New York, on October 14, 1861. George W. Cothran of Lockport in Niagara County and Charles E. Winegar of Shelby in Orleans County were the principal organizers. Cothran became the captain, and Winegar was commissioned senior first lieutenant. (At the time, Winegar was 29 years old.) The battery enlisted for three years of service. The battery moved to Albany and then to Washington, D. C. While at Camp Barry outside Washington, the battery was incorporated into the First New York Artillery, apparently against the wishes of the members of the unit.

In January 1862, Cothran’s battery was given six ten-pound Parrott rifles together with teams of horses. The unit was assigned to the command of Major General Nathaniel Banks in the Department of the Rappahannock. It was positioned at Frederick, Maryland, and nearby Point of Rocks. The battery finally saw active service in March, when Banks took his forces into Virginia. The battery saw action at the First Battle of Winchester on May 25, 1862. Winegar, who was ill at the time, still took command of a section of the battery. He was mentioned in dispatches for creditable behavior during Banks’ retreat after the battle. (Cothran had been arrested on a charge of defrauding the government and faced a court martial. He was convicted but was reinstated on June 4.) Battery M also served at the Battle of Cedar Mountain, serving on the far right of Banks' line.

When XII Corps was formed, Cothran’s battery was assigned to the division of Brigadier General Alpheus S. Williams. Winegar took charge of the battery for much of this period. Major General Henry W. Slocum, new commander of XII Corps, advanced the brigade of Brigadier General Thomas L. Kane and Battery M under Winegar to Loudoun Heights, Virginia, near Harper’s Ferry from Pleasant Valley in Washington County, Maryland. Cothran returned in time for the Battle of Antietam, reporting for the battery's conduct in support of XII Corps at the north end of the battlefield near the East Woods. Cothran reported helping repulse more than one Confederate charge.

At the time of the Battle of Fredericksburg, Slocum advanced the corps, including Battery M, to Fairfax Station. At the time of the Mud March, the corps advanced to Stafford Court House, where it remained based until the spring of 1863. By that time Cothran was absent ill, never returning. Winegar was in command at the end of 1862 and would remain so into late 1863.

== Chancellorsville ==
At the Battle of Chancellorsville, Winegar was in command of the battery once more, and it crossed the Rappahannock River on April 30, accompanying the advance of Williams’ division. On May 1 Winegar's battery advanced with Williams' command up the Plank Road toward Fredericksburg. Battery M had yet to open fire on the Confederates when the corps was recalled to a defensive position in the Fairview clearing near the Chancellor house facing east. From there it fired on Confederate gunners until ammunition ran low on May 2. A section of Battery K 1st New York Light Artillery was sent to Winegar's relief. The battery was still in its position on May 3 when it was ordered to fall back with the rest of XII Corps. Some caissons had to be left behind during the retreat. Lieutenant Winegar and an enlisted man went looking for the abandoned caissons. They were captured by the enemy. When Lieutenant John D. Woodbury reported for the battery, Winegar was still missing without word of him. At the end of the battle, the battery was in reserve between Chancellorsville and United States Ford. After withdrawal on May 5, the battery camped at Stafford Court House with the rest of XII Corps.

== Gettysburg ==
Winegar was exchanged in time to join the artillery brigade of XII Corps in the Gettysburg campaign. His battery crossed the Potomac River on June 26, 1863, with Williams' division. When XII Corps camped overnight June 30-July 1 near Gettysburg, Winegar's battery was deployed with infantry support to guard the camp. During the Battle of Gettysburg, the battery had only four ten-pound Parrott rifles. On the evening of July 1, Slocum used Winegar's guns and other batteries to cover the gap between his corps and I Corps just south of the town cemetery. Battery M was moved later to just east of Powers Hill (called Slocum's Hill in some reports), near Slocum's headquarters.

Captain Clermont L. Best, XII Corps chief of artillery, moved some of Winegar's guns on the night on July 2–3. Thus on July 3, 1863, one section of the battery was located on Powers Hill, but the other section was on McAllister’s Hill near Rock Creek. (The monument to Winegar’s battery stands on Powers Hill forward of its actual position.) The battery took part in the cannonade that preceded a largely successful effort to recapture ground lost on July 2 when most of XII Corps was sent to the left flank of the army as reinforcements.

== The Western Theater of the War ==
XII Corps was sent west in the fall of 1863 to help relieve the siege of Chattanooga in the Chattanooga campaign. Winegar's battery was among the units sent. There, after the conclusion of the Battles for Chattanooga, most of its units were merged with those of XI Corps into the new XX Corps, Army of the Cumberland. On February 6, 1864, many of the original members of Battery M re-enlisted and were mustered in for a new period of service. The veterans received their re-enlistment furloughs and went home, returning to camp near Chattanooga around the middle of April.

Charles Winegar was promoted to the rank of captain on May 3, 1864, and he took command of Battery I, 1st New York Light Artillery with its six three-inch rifled guns. (Captain Michael Wiedrich had been assigned to a heavy artillery regiment; and Nicholas Sahm, his successor, had died.) This unit also was part of XX Corps, which eventually became a part of the Army of Georgia under Major General Slocum. In that corps, Winegar’s battery served in the Atlanta campaign, Sherman’s March to the Sea and the Carolinas campaign. It was assigned to Williams' division until all XX Corps batteries were combined into an artillery brigade under Major John A. Reynolds during the Atlanta Campaign.

The Atlanta Campaign of Major General William Tecumseh Sherman was a busy one for Winegar and his men. His battery was seriously involved in support of Williams' division on the left flank of Sherman's army in the Battle of Resaca on May 13, 1864, helping repel an assault by Lieutenant General John B. Hood. During Sherman's advance from Resaca toward Atlanta, Battery I's guns were used in small engagements and a fight with a Confederate battery, which Winegar said he won. Battery I played a significant role in the Battle of Kolb's Farm on June 22, being credited by Major Reynolds with doing damage to a Confederate attack on XX Corps. Battery I crossed the Chattahoochee River on July 2, 1864. At the Battle of Peachtree Creek on July 20 Winegar's guns were used to good effect at two places on the Union line against the Confederate assault on the Army of the Cumberland. Winegar's own report traced the battery's movements from Lookout Valley, Tennessee, to Atlanta. He made a particular point of the attack's by John B. Hood's corps at Kolb's Farm his battery helped stop.

Winegar's report on the Siege of Atlanta mostly records exchanges of fire with the Confederate defenders. Occasionally the battery experienced losses, including a lieutenant shot through the head by a southern marksman. When Sherman gambled on flanking Hood out of Atlanta in late August, XX Corps fell back to the Chattahoochee to defend the Union supply line. After the Battle of Jonesborough forced Hood to abandon Atlanta, XX Corps took possession. A section of Battery I was able to enter the Confederate works on September 2, 1864, with the rest of the battery following later. Winegar reported losing one officer and three men killed and ten men wounded, plus three horses killed and seven wounded, in the campaign.

Sherman did not leave the vicinity of Atlanta quickly. This required foraging for fresh meat and grain. In October, Colonel Daniel Dustin took much of third division XX Corps plus artillery and cavalry foraging east of Decatur, Georgia. Winegar commanded the two batteries involved in Dustin's raid, which garnered 400 wagon loads of supplies. When Sherman left Atlanta on November 15, XX Corps was part of the column Major General Slocum led in the March to the Sea, what later was called the Army of Georgia. Winegar's guns were little used apparently until Sherman reached Savannah, Georgia, and XX Corps was positioned of the left of Sherman's forces. On December 12, 1864, when Sherman's army was investing Savannah, Winegar’s battery was positioned in ambush on the banks of the Savannah River opposite Argyle Island. There it fired on two Confederate gunboats, the Sampson and the Macon, and their tender, the Resolute, which had come down river from Augusta, Georgia. All three ships were hit. The Sampson and the Resolute collided while reacting to Winegar's fire, and the damaged Resolute was captured by the Federals when it drifted to shore. The gunboats escaped upriver. Winegar later commented to Major Henry M. Hitchcock that he was looking forward to another naval engagement. Four days later, Battery I was moved to Argyle Island to deal with harassment of Colonel Ezra Carman's brigade by Confederate guns. When Savannah fell, Winegar reported capture of a considerable quantity of animals and supplies.

Battery I took part in the Carolinas Campaign, still under Slocum, departing Savannah on January 17, 1865. At first the battery accompanied the third division XX Corps. The battery participated in the Battle of Averasborough (March 16) and the Battle of Bentonville (March 19–21). In the latter fight, Battery I played a significant role in repelling the attack of Major General William B. Bate from its position near the Goldsboro Pike. The battery was part of a concentration of XX Corps guns Major Reynolds had assembled to fill a gap in the corps' line. Late in the war, on April 1, 1865, as Sherman moved northward toward Raleigh, North Carolina, Captain Winegar took command of the artillery brigade of XX Corps after Major Reynolds left the army on leave. The battey lost 4 men missing and 3 horses wounded in the Carolinas Campaign. After the war ended, Winegar was mustered out with his battery at Buffalo, New York, on June 23, 1865.
