= Solem v. Stumes =

- Supreme Court of the United States

Argued November 28, 1983 Decided February 29, 1984
- Full case name: Solem, Warden, South Dakota State Penitentiary v. Norman Stumes
- Citations: 465 U.S. 638 (more) 104 S. Ct. 1338; 79 L. Ed. 2d 579; 1984 U.S. LEXIS 36; 52 U.S.L.W. 4307

Holding
- Edwards v. Arizona should not be applied retroactively, and therefore the Court of Appeals erred in evaluating the constitutionality of the police conduct in this case.

Court membership
- Chief Justice Warren E. Burger Associate Justices William J. Brennan Jr. · Byron White; Thurgood Marshall · Harry Blackmun; Lewis F. Powell Jr. · William Rehnquist; John P. Stevens · Sandra Day O'Connor

Case opinions
- Majority: White, joined by Burger, Blackmun, Rehnquist, O'Connor
- Concurrence: Powell
- Dissent: Stevens, joined by Brennan, Marshall

Solem v. Stumes, 465 U.S. 638 (1984), is a decision of the Supreme Court of the United States in which the Court held that its decision in Edwards v. Arizona (1980) should not be applied retroactively.
