= List of United States Supreme Court cases, volume 53 =

Supreme Court of the United States
- Interactive map of Supreme Court of the United States
- 38°53′26″N 77°00′16″W
- Established: March 4, 1789; 236 years ago
- Location: Washington, D.C.
- Coordinates: 38°53′26″N 77°00′16″W
- Composition method: Presidential nomination with Senate confirmation
- Authorised by: Constitution of the United States, Art. III, § 1
- Judge term length: life tenure, subject to impeachment and removal
- Number of positions: 9 (by statute)
- Website: supremecourt.gov

This is a list of cases reported in volume 53 (12 How.) of United States Reports, decided by the Supreme Court of the United States in 1851 and 1852.

== Nominative reports ==
In 1874, the U.S. government created the United States Reports, and retroactively numbered older privately published case reports as part of the new series. As a result, cases appearing in volumes 1–90 of U.S. Reports have dual citation forms; one for the volume number of U.S. Reports, and one for the volume number of the reports named for the relevant reporter of decisions (these are called "nominative reports").

=== Benjamin Chew Howard ===
Starting with the 42nd volume of U.S. Reports, the Reporter of Decisions of the Supreme Court of the United States was Benjamin Chew Howard. Howard was Reporter of Decisions from 1843 to 1860, covering volumes 42 through 65 of United States Reports which correspond to volumes 1 through 24 of his Howard's Reports. As such, the dual form of citation to, for example, Bein v. Heath is 53 U.S. (12 How.) 168 (1852).

== Justices of the Supreme Court at the time of 53 U.S. (12 How.) ==
The Supreme Court is established by Article III, Section 1 of the Constitution of the United States, which says: "The judicial Power of the United States, shall be vested in one supreme Court . . .". The size of the Court is not specified; the Constitution leaves it to Congress to set the number of justices. Under the Judiciary Act of 1789 Congress originally fixed the number of justices at six (one chief justice and five associate justices). Since 1789 Congress has varied the size of the Court from six to seven, nine, ten, and back to nine justices (always including one chief justice).

When the cases in 53 U.S. (12 How.) were decided the Court comprised these nine members:

Portrait	Justice	Office	Home State	Succeeded	Date confirmed by the Senate (Vote)	Tenure on Supreme Court
	Roger B. Taney	Chief Justice	Maryland	John Marshall	March 15, 1836 (29–15)	March 28, 1836 – October 12, 1864 (Died)
	John McLean	Associate Justice	Ohio	Robert Trimble	March 7, 1829 (Acclamation)	January 11, 1830 – April 4, 1861 (Died)
	James Moore Wayne	Associate Justice	Georgia	William Johnson	January 9, 1835 (Acclamation)	January 14, 1835 – July 5, 1867 (Died)
	John Catron	Associate Justice	Tennessee	newly created seat	March 8, 1837 (28–15)	May 1, 1837 – May 30, 1865 (Died)
	John McKinley	Associate Justice	Alabama	newly created seat	September 25, 1837 (Acclamation)	January 9, 1838 – July 19, 1852 (Died)
	Peter Vivian Daniel	Associate Justice	Virginia	Philip P. Barbour	March 2, 1841 (25–5)	January 10, 1842 – May 31, 1860 (Died)
	Samuel Nelson	Associate Justice	New York	Smith Thompson	February 14, 1845 (Acclamation)	February 27, 1845 – November 28, 1872 (Retired)
	Robert Cooper Grier	Associate Justice	Pennsylvania	Henry Baldwin	August 4, 1846 (Acclamation)	August 10, 1846 – January 31, 1870 (Retired)
	Benjamin Robbins Curtis	Associate Justice	Massachusetts	Levi Woodbury	December 20, 1851 (Acclamation)	October 10, 1851 – September 30, 1857 (Resigned)

== Notable case in 53 U.S. (12 How.) ==
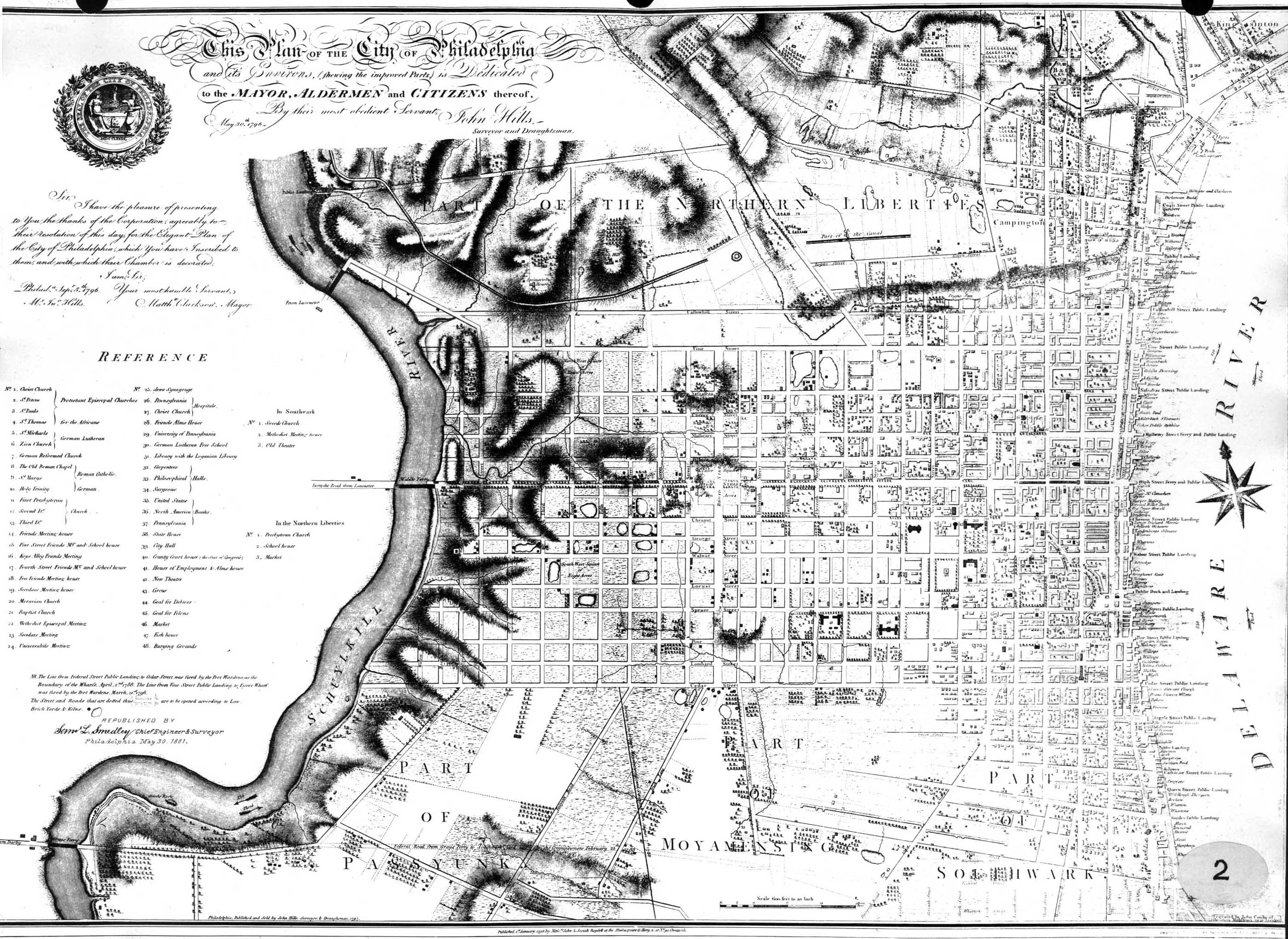
Philadelphia in 1796

=== Cooley v. Board of Wardens of the Port of Philadelphia ex rel. Society for the Relief of Distressed Pilots, their Widows & Children ===
In Cooley v. Board of Wardens, 53 U.S. (12 How.) 299 (1852), the Supreme Court held that a Pennsylvania law requiring all ships entering or leaving the Port of Philadelphia to hire a local river pilot did not violate the Commerce Clause of the Constitution. The Court decided that the constitutional grant to Congress of power to regulate interstate commerce did not deprive the states of power to regulate maritime pilots; although Congress had legislated on the subject, its legislation showed an intention not to preempt the entire topic. The ruling, however, "empowered the slave states to interfere with interstate commerce to protect slavery."

== Citation style ==
Under the Judiciary Act of 1789 the federal court structure at the time comprised District Courts, which had general trial jurisdiction; Circuit Courts, which had mixed trial and appellate (from the US District Courts) jurisdiction; and the United States Supreme Court, which had appellate jurisdiction over the federal District and Circuit courts—and for certain issues over state courts. The Supreme Court also had limited original jurisdiction (i.e., in which cases could be filed directly with the Supreme Court without first having been heard by a lower federal or state court). There were one or more federal District Courts and/or Circuit Courts in each state, territory, or other geographical region.

Bluebook citation style is used for case names, citations, and jurisdictions.

- "C.C.D." = United States Circuit Court for the District of . . .
  - e.g.,"C.C.D.N.J." = United States Circuit Court for the District of New Jersey
- "D." = United States District Court for the District of . . .
  - e.g.,"D. Mass." = United States District Court for the District of Massachusetts
- "E." = Eastern; "M." = Middle; "N." = Northern; "S." = Southern; "W." = Western
  - e.g.,"C.C.S.D.N.Y." = United States Circuit Court for the Southern District of New York
  - e.g.,"M.D. Ala." = United States District Court for the Middle District of Alabama
- "Ct. Cl." = United States Court of Claims
- The abbreviation of a state's name alone indicates the highest appellate court in that state's judiciary at the time.
  - e.g.,"Pa." = Supreme Court of Pennsylvania
  - e.g.,"Me." = Supreme Judicial Court of Maine

== List of cases in 53 U.S. (12 How.) ==
Case Name	Page and year	Opinion of the Court	Concurring opinion(s)	Dissenting opinion(s)	Lower court	Disposition of case
Miners' Bank v. Iowa	1 (1851)	Daniel	none	none	Iowa	dismissed
Binns v. Lawrence	9 (1852)	Daniel	none	none	C.C.S.D.N.Y.	certification
Smith v. Clark	21 (1852)	Taney	none	none	C.C.D. Mass.	dismissal denied
Thredgill v. Pintard	24 (1851)	McLean	none	none	C.C.D. Ark.	affirmed
Parks v. Turner	39 (1851)	Taney	none	none	C.C.E.D. La.	affirmed
Montault v. United States	47 (1851)	Taney	none	none	S.D. Ala.	affirmed
Farmers' Bank v. Groves	51 (1851)	Nelson	none	none	C.C.D. Louisiana	affirmed
Lessieur v. Price	59 (1851)	Catron	none	none	Mo.	affirmed
Harris v. Runnels	79 (1851)	Wayne	none	none	C.C.S.D. Miss.	reversed
United States v. Bromley	88 (1851)	McLean	none	none	C.C.N.D.N.Y.	reversed
Neilson v. Lagow	98 (1851)	Curtis	none	none	Ind.	reversed
Williams v. Oliver I	111 (1851)	Nelson	none	none	Md.	dismissed
Williams v. Oliver II	125 (1851)	Nelson	none	none	Md.	dismissed
Dorsey v. Packwood	126 (1852)	Grier	none	none	C.C.E.D. La.	affirmed
Russell v. Southard	139 (1851)	Curtis	none	none	C.C.D. Ky.	reversed
Ives v. Merchants' Bank	159 (1852)	Catron	none	none	C.C.D.R.I.	affirmed
Grand Gulf et al. Co. v. Marshall	165 (1852)	Taney	none	none	La.	dismissed
Bein v. Heath	168 (1852)	Taney	none	none	C.C.E.D. La.	reversed
Wilbur v. Almy	180 (1852)	Curtis	none	none	C.C.D.R.I.	reversed
Erwin v. Parham	197 (1852)	Catron	none	Nelson	C.C.D. La.	reversed
United States v. Moore	209 (1852)	Catron	none	none	E.D. La.	reversed
Lyman v. Bank of the U.S.	225 (1852)	Nelson	none	none	C.C.D. Vt.	affirmed
United States v. Wilkinson	246 (1852)	Taney	none	none	C.C.E.D. La.	reversed
Bond v. Brown	254 (1852)	Taney	none	none	C.C.E.D. La.	affirmed
Dundas v. Hitchcock	256 (1852)	Grier	none	none	C.C.S.D. Ala.	reversed
Clark v. Barnwell	272 (1852)	Nelson	none	none	C.C.D.S.C.	reversed
Teal v. Felton	284 (1852)	Wayne	none	none	N.Y.	affirmed
Achison v. Huddleson	293 (1852)	Curtis	none	none	Md.	reversed
Cooley v. Board of Wardens of the Port of Philadelphia ex rel. Society for the Relief of Distressed Pilots, their Widows & Children	299 (1852)	Curtis	Daniel	McLean	Pa.	affirmed
Union Bank v. Stafford	327 (1852)	Grier	none	none	D. Tex.	reversed
Smyth v. Strader Pevine & Co.	327 (1852)	per curiam	none	none	C.C.S.D. Ala.	dismissed
New Orleans et al. Co. v. Stafford	343 (1852)	Grier	none	none	D. Tex.	reversed
Rich v. Lambert	347 (1852)	Nelson	none	Daniel	C.C.D.S.C.	reversed
United States v. Reid	361 (1852)	Taney	none	none	C.C.E.D. Va.	certification
Bennett v. Butterworth	367 (1852)	McLean	none	none	D. Tex.	affirmed
Sargeant v. State Bank	371 (1852)	Daniel	none	none	C.C.D. Ind.	affirmed
Saltmarsh v. Tuthill	387 (1852)	Taney	none	none	M.D. Ala.	motion reserved
Dinsman v. Wilkes	390 (1852)	Taney	none	none	C.C.D.C.	reversed
Snead v. McCoull	407 (1852)	Daniel	none	none	C.C.E.D. Va.	affirmed
Linton v. Stanton	423 (1852)	Taney	none	none	La.	dismissed
United States v. Porche	426 (1852)	Taney	none	none	E.D. La.	certification
United States v. Simon	433 (1852)	Grier	none	none	D. La.	reversed
United States v. Leblanc	435 (1852)	Taney	none	none	E.D. La.	reversed
United States v. Castant	437 (1852)	Daniel	none	none	E.D. La.	reversed
The Propeller Genesee Chief	443 (1852)	Taney	none	Daniel	C.C.N.D.N.Y.	affirmed
Fretz v. Bull	466 (1852)	Wayne	none	Daniel	C.C.E.D. La.	affirmed
Gaines v. Relf	472 (1852)	Catron	none	Wayne	C.C.E.D. La.	affirmed

== See also ==
- certificate of division
