= Hughes v. Alexandria Scrap Corp. =

- Supreme Court of the United States

Argued January 21, 1976 Decided June 24, 1976
- Full case name: Harry R. Hughes, Secretary of Transportation of Maryland, et al. v. Alexandria Scrap Corporation
- Citations: 426 U.S. 794 (more) 96 S. Ct. 2488; 49 L. Ed. 2d 220; 1976 U.S. LEXIS 136

Case history
- Prior: Alexandria Scrap Corp. v. Hughes, 391 F. Supp. 46 (D. Md. 1975); probable jurisdiction noted, 423 U.S. 819 (1975).

Holding
- The Maryland statute does not constitute an impermissible burden on interstate commerce in violation of the Commerce Clause.

Court membership
- Chief Justice Warren E. Burger Associate Justices William J. Brennan Jr. · Potter Stewart; Byron White · Thurgood Marshall; Harry Blackmun · Lewis F. Powell Jr. William Rehnquist · John P. Stevens

Case opinions
- Majority: Powell, joined by Burger, Stewart, Blacknum, Rehnquist, Stevens
- Concurrence: Stevens
- Dissent: Brennan, joined by White, Marshall

Hughes v. Alexandria Scrap Corp., 426 U.S. 794 (1976), was a case argued before the Supreme Court of the United States. Maryland created a program that, 1) purchased junked cars, 2) paid a bounty for those with Maryland license plates and, 3) imposed more stringent documentation requirements on out-of-state processors, in an effort to reduce the number of abandoned cars in Maryland.

The Issue before the Court was whether such a program violates the Dormant Commerce Clause—essentially, whether Maryland could Constitutionally discriminate or burden interstate commerce by imposing more stringent documentation requirements on out-of-state processors or favoring in-state car dealerships when they purchase junk cars.

Unlike previous Dormant Commerce Clause cases, Maryland was acting like a market participant (as opposed to a state regulator). In such instances, the Court determined that a state actor can favor its own citizens over the foreign citizens.

This case created the "market participant" exception to the general restrictions on states imposed by the Dormant Commerce Clause.

Determining when a state is acting like a "market participant" rather than as a regulator was not decided by this case, but found in South Central Timber Development v. Wunnicke.

== See also ==
- List of United States Supreme Court cases, volume 426
