= Battery I, 1st New York Light Artillery =

Battery I, 1st New York Light Artillery Regiment
- Active: 16 October 1861 – 23 June 1865
- Country: United States
- Allegiance: (United States) Union; New York
- Branch: Union Army
- Type: Field Artillery
- Size: Artillery Battery
- Equipment: 3-inch Ordnance rifles (1864)
- Engagements: American Civil War; Battle of Cross Keys (1862); 2nd Battle of Bull Run (1862); Battle of Chancellorsville (1863); Battle of Gettysburg (1863); Battle of Lookout Mountain (1863); Battle of Missionary Ridge (1863); Atlanta campaign (1864); Sherman's March to the Sea (1864); Battle of Bentonville (1865)

Commanders
- Notable commanders: Charles E. Winegar

Battery I, 1st New York Light Artillery Regiment was an artillery battery from New York state that served in the Union Army during the American Civil War. The battery was organized in October 1861. It fought at Cross Keys and Second Bull Run in 1862. Battery I fought at Chancellorsville, Gettysburg, and Chattanooga in 1863. It participated in the Atlanta campaign and Sherman's March to the Sea in 1864 and fought at Bentonville in 1865. The battery took part in the Grand Review of the Armies and was mustered out in June 1865.

== Organizations ==
Organized at Buffalo, N.Y. Left Buffalo for Washington, D.C., October 16, 1861. Attached to Blenker's Division, Army of the Potomac, to March, 1862. 3rd Brigade, Blenker's Division, 2nd Army Corps, Army of the Potomac, to April, 1862. 3rd Brigade, Blenker's Division, Mountain Department, to June, 1862. Reserve Artillery, 1st Corps, Army of Virginia, to September, 1862. Artillery, 3rd Division, 11th Army Corps, Army of the Potomac, to October, 1862. Artillery, 2nd Division, 11th Army Corps, to May, 1863. Artillery Brigade, 11th Army Corps. to October, 1863. Artillery Brigade, 11th Army Corps, Dept. of the Cumberland, to January, 1864. Artillery, 2nd Division, 11th Army Corps, to April, 1864. Artillery, 1st Division, 20th Army Corps, Army of the Cumberland, to July, 1864. Artillery Brigade, 20th Army Corps, to June, 1865.

== Service ==
Duty in the Defenses of Washington, D.C., until March, 1862. Advance on Manassas, Va., March 10. At Fairfax Court House until March 24. Ordered to join Fremont in West Virginia, and pursuit of Jackson up the Valley April and May. Near Strasburg June 1. Union Church June 5. Battle of Cross Keys June 8. Near Port Republic June 9. At Sperryville until August. Pope's Campaign in Northern Virginia August 16-September 2. Fords of the Rappahannock August 20–23. Sulphur Springs August 23–24. Plains of Manassas August 27–29. Battle of Bull August 30. Duty in the Defenses of Washington until December. March to Fredericksburg, Va., December 10–16. Duty at Falmouth and Brook's Station until April, 1863. "Mud March" January 20–24. Chancellorsville Campaign April 27-May 6. Battle of Chancellorsville May 1–5. Battle of Gettysburg, Pa., July 1–3. Pursuit of Lee July 5–24. Near Bristoe Station until September. Movement to Bridgeport, Ala., September 24-October 3. Reopening Tennessee River October 26–29. Battle of Wauhatchie, Lookout Valley, Tenn., October 28–29. Chattanooga-Ringgold Campaign November 23–27. Battle of Lookout Mountain November 23–24. Mission Ridge November 25. March to relief of Knoxville November 28-December 17. At Bridgeport, Ala., until April, 1864. Atlanta (Ga.) Campaign May 1 to September 8. Operations about Rocky Faced Ridge, Tunnel Hill, and Buzzard's Roost Gap May 8–11. Battle of Resaca May 14–15. Adairsville May 17–18. Cassville May 19. Advance on Dallas May 23–25. New Hope Church May 25. Operations on line of Pumpkin Vine Creek and battles about Dallas, New Hope Church and Allatoona Hills May 25-June 5. Operations about Marietta and against Kenesaw Mountain June 10-July 2. Pine Mountain June 11–14. Lost Mountain June 15–17. Gilgal (or Golgotha Church) June 15. Muddy Creek June 17. Noyes' Creek June 19. Kolb's Farm June 22. Assault on Kenesaw June 27. Ruff's Station, Smyrna Camp Ground, July 4. Chattahoochee River July 5–17. Peach Tree Creek July 19–20. Siege of Atlanta July 22-August 25. Operations at Chattahoochee River Bridge August 26-September 2. Occupation of Atlanta September 2-November 15. March to the sea November 15-December 10. Siege of Savannah December 10–21. Campaign of the Carolinas January to April, 1865. Lawtonville, S.C., February 2. Averysboro, N. C, March 16. Battle of Bentonville March 19–21. Occupation of Goldsboro March 24, and of Raleigh April 14. Bennett's House April 26. Surrender of Johnston and his army. March to Washington, D.C., via Richmond, Va., April 29-May 20. Grand Review May 24. Mustered out June 23, 1865.

Battery lost during service 1 Officer and 12 Enlisted men killed and mortally wounded and 1 Officer and 15 Enlisted men by disease. Total 29.

== Atlanta campaign ==
At the Battle of Kolb's Farm on 22 June 1864, Battery I commanded by Lieutenant Charles E. Winegar was armed with 3-inch Ordnance rifles. While assisting in the defense of Alpheus S. Williams' division, the guns fired canister and spherical case shot to repulse a Confederate infantry attack.

== See also ==
- List of New York Civil War units
