= Minnesota Board for Community Colleges v. Knight =

- Supreme Court of the United States

Argued November 1, 1983 Decided February 21, 1984
- Full case name: Minnesota State Board for Community Colleges v. Knight et al
- Citations: 465 U.S. 271 (more)

Holding
- "Meet and confer" provisions do not violate appellees' constitutional rights.

Court membership
- Chief Justice Warren E. Burger Associate Justices William J. Brennan Jr. · Byron White; Thurgood Marshall · Harry Blackmun; Lewis F. Powell Jr. · William Rehnquist; John P. Stevens · Sandra Day O'Connor

Case opinions
- Majority: O'Connor, joined by Burger, White, Blackmun, Rehnquist
- Concurrence: Marshall
- Dissent: Brennan
- Dissent: Stevens, joined by Brennan (all but Part III), Powell (all but Part II)

Laws applied
- U.S. Const. amend. I

Minnesota Board for Community Colleges v. Knight, 465 U.S. 271 (1984), was a collective bargaining rights case brought before the United States Supreme Court. The decision had effects on how the First Amendment to the United States Constitution is interpreted.

The appellants, the Minnesota State Board for Community Colleges (Board) and the Minnesota Community College Faculty Association (MCCFA), had agreed among themselves to establish "meet and confer committees" for discussing any campus policy issues not subject to mandatory bargaining. They had legally done so under a provision of the Minnesota Public Employee Labor Relations Act (PELRA).

A group of 20 Minnesota community college faculty not represented by the MCCFA sued in District Court over the committees, successfully arguing that their First and Fourteenth Amendment speech and associational rights had been violated by their exclusion from their employer's policymaking process.

The MCCFA then counter-sued the faculty, and succeeded in establishing before the Supreme Court that PELRA's "meet and confer" provisions do not violate the Constitution. In her majority opinion, Justice Sandra Day O'Connor wrote that "nothing in the First Amendment or in this Court's case law interpreting it suggests that the rights to speak, associate, and petition require government policymakers to listen or respond to communications of members of the public on public issues."
