= List of United States Supreme Court cases, volume 82 =

Supreme Court of the United States
- Interactive map of Supreme Court of the United States
- 38°53′26″N 77°00′16″W
- Established: March 4, 1789; 236 years ago
- Location: Washington, D.C.
- Coordinates: 38°53′26″N 77°00′16″W
- Composition method: Presidential nomination with Senate confirmation
- Authorised by: Constitution of the United States, Art. III, § 1
- Judge term length: life tenure, subject to impeachment and removal
- Number of positions: 9 (by statute)
- Website: supremecourt.gov

This is a list of cases reported in volume 82 (15 Wall.) of United States Reports, decided by the Supreme Court of the United States in 1873.

== Nominative reports ==
In 1874, the U.S. government created the United States Reports, and retroactively numbered older privately published case reports as part of the new series. As a result, cases appearing in volumes 1–90 of U.S. Reports have dual citation forms; one for the volume number of U.S. Reports, and one for the volume number of the reports named for the relevant reporter of decisions (these are called "nominative reports").

=== John William Wallace ===
Starting with the 66th volume of U.S. Reports, the Reporter of Decisions of the Supreme Court of the United States was John William Wallace. Wallace was Reporter of Decisions from 1863 to 1874, covering volumes 68 through 90 of United States Reports which correspond to volumes 1 through 23 of his Wallace's Reports. As such, the dual form of citation to, for example, Hannewinkle v. Georgetown is 82 U.S. (15 Wall.) 547 (1873).

Wallace's Reports were the final nominative reports for the US Supreme Court; starting with volume 91, cases were identified simply as "(volume #) U.S. (page #) (year)".

== Justices of the Supreme Court at the time of 82 U.S. (15 Wall.) ==
The Supreme Court is established by Article III, Section 1 of the Constitution of the United States, which says: "The judicial Power of the United States, shall be vested in one supreme Court . . .". The size of the Court is not specified; the Constitution leaves it to Congress to set the number of justices. Under the Judiciary Act of 1789 Congress originally fixed the number of justices at six (one chief justice and five associate justices). Since 1789 Congress has varied the size of the Court from six to seven, nine, ten, and back to nine justices (always including one chief justice).

When the cases in 82 U.S. (15 Wall.) were decided the Court comprised nine of the following ten members at any one time (Samuel Nelson retired early during the term, and was replaced by Ward Hunt in mid-term):

=== Justices during at least part of the Court session reported in 82 U.S. (15 Wall.) ===
Portrait	Justice	Office	Home State	Succeeded	Date confirmed by the Senate (Vote)	Tenure on Supreme Court
	Salmon P. Chase	Chief Justice	Ohio	Roger B. Taney	December 6, 1864 (Acclamation)	December 15, 1864 – May 7, 1873 (Died)
	Samuel Nelson	Associate Justice	New York	Smith Thompson	February 14, 1845 (Acclamation)	February 27, 1845 – November 28, 1872 (Retired)
	Nathan Clifford	Associate Justice	Maine	Benjamin Robbins Curtis	January 12, 1858 (26–23)	January 21, 1858 – July 25, 1881 (Died)
	Noah Haynes Swayne	Associate Justice	Ohio	John McLean	January 24, 1862 (38–1)	January 27, 1862 – January 24, 1881 (Retired)
	Samuel Freeman Miller	Associate Justice	Iowa	Peter Vivian Daniel	July 16, 1862 (Acclamation)	July 21, 1862 – October 13, 1890 (Died)
	David Davis	Associate Justice	Illinois	John Archibald Campbell	December 8, 1862 (Acclamation)	December 10, 1862 – March 4, 1877 (Resigned)
	Stephen Johnson Field	Associate Justice	California	newly created seat	March 10, 1863 (Acclamation)	May 10, 1863 – December 1, 1897 (Retired)
	William Strong	Associate Justice	Pennsylvania	Robert Cooper Grier	February 18, 1870 (No vote recorded)	March 14, 1870 – December 14, 1880 (Retired)
	Joseph P. Bradley	Associate Justice	New Jersey	newly created seat	March 21, 1870 (46–9)	March 23, 1870 – January 22, 1892 (Died)
	Ward Hunt	Associate Justice	New York	Samuel Nelson	December 11, 1872 (Acclamation)	January 9, 1873 – January 27, 1882 (Retired)

== Citation style ==
Under the Judiciary Act of 1789 the federal court structure at the time comprised District Courts, which had general trial jurisdiction; Circuit Courts, which had mixed trial and appellate (from the US District Courts) jurisdiction; and the United States Supreme Court, which had appellate jurisdiction over the federal District and Circuit courts—and for certain issues over state courts. The Supreme Court also had limited original jurisdiction (i.e., in which cases could be filed directly with the Supreme Court without first having been heard by a lower federal or state court). There were one or more federal District Courts and/or Circuit Courts in each state, territory, or other geographical region.

Bluebook citation style is used for case names, citations, and jurisdictions.

- "C.C.D." = United States Circuit Court for the District of . . .
  - e.g.,"C.C.D.N.J." = United States Circuit Court for the District of New Jersey
- "D." = United States District Court for the District of . . .
  - e.g.,"D. Mass." = United States District Court for the District of Massachusetts
- "E." = Eastern; "M." = Middle; "N." = Northern; "S." = Southern; "W." = Western
  - e.g.,"C.C.S.D.N.Y." = United States Circuit Court for the Southern District of New York
  - e.g.,"M.D. Ala." = United States District Court for the Middle District of Alabama
- "Ct. Cl." = United States Court of Claims
- The abbreviation of a state's name alone indicates the highest appellate court in that state's judiciary at the time.
  - e.g.,"Pa." = Supreme Court of Pennsylvania
  - e.g.,"Me." = Supreme Judicial Court of Maine

== List of cases in 82 U.S. (15 Wall.) ==
Case Name	Page & year	Opinion of the Court	Concurring opinion(s)	Dissenting opinion(s)	Lower Court	Disposition
Portland Co. v. United States	1 (1873)	Chase	none	none	Ct. Cl.	dismissed
Sioux City & D.R.R. v. Richmond	3 (1873)	Chase	none	none	Iowa	dismissal denied
Norwich & W.R.R. v. Johnson	8 (1873)	Chase	none	none	Conn.	dismissal denied
Dexter v. Hall	9 (1873)	Strong	none	none	C.C.D. Cal.	affirmed
The John Griffin	29 (1873)	Miller	none	none	C.C.E.D.N.Y.	reversed
United States v. Kelly	34 (1873)	Chase	none	none	Ct. Cl.	affirmed
Smoot's Case	36 (1873)	Miller	none	none	Ct. Cl.	affirmed
Kearney v. Denn	51 (1873)	Swayne	none	none	C.C.D. Md.	affirmed
Maddox v. United States	58 (1873)	Davis	none	none	Ct. Cl.	affirmed
Gray v. Darlington	63 (1873)	Field	none	Chase	C.C.E.D. Pa.	affirmed
Tarver v. Keach	67 (1873)	Chase	none	none	Tex.	dismissed
Cheney v. Van Arsdale	68 (1873)	Strong	none	none	C.C.E.D. Wis.	reversed
Erskine v. Van Arsdale	75 (1873)	Chase	none	none	C.C.E.D. Wis.	affirmed
Yosemite Valley Case	77 (1873)	Field	none	none	Cal.	affirmed
Chesapeake et al. Co. v. Hill	94 (1873)	Bradley	none	Strong	Sup. Ct. D.C.	affirmed
Morgan's Assignees v. Shinn	105 (1873)	Strong	none	none	not indicated	affirmed
United States v. Singer	111 (1873)	Field	none	none	C.C.N.D. Ill.	reversed
Hedrick v. Hughes	123 (1873)	Bradley	none	none	C.C.D. Mo.	affirmed
Bouldin v. Alexander	131 (1873)	Strong	none	none	Sup. Ct. D.C.	affirmed
Pickersgill v. Lahens	140 (1873)	Davis	none	none	C.C.S.D.N.Y.	affirmed
Marshall v. City of Vicksburg	146 (1873)	Swayne	none	none	C.C.S.D. Miss.	affirmed
Shutte v. Thompson	151 (1873)	Strong	none	none	D.W. Va.	affirmed
Duncan v. Jaudon	165 (1873)	Davis	none	none	C.C.S.D.N.Y.	affirmed
Brown v. Hiatts	177 (1873)	Field	none	none	C.C.D. Kan.	reversed
Gould v. Rees	187 (1873)	Clifford	none	none	C.C.W.D. Pa.	reversed
Norwich & W.R.R. Co. v. Johnson	195 (1873)	Miller	none	Chase	Conn.	reversed
Pelham v. Way	196 (1873)	Strong	none	none	C.C.D. Ind.	affirmed
Reybold v. United States	202 (1873)	Davis	none	none	Ct. Cl.	affirmed
Salomons v. Graham	208 (1873)	Chase	none	none	La.	dismissed
Oelrichs v. Spain	211 (1873)	Swayne	none	none	Sup. Ct. D.C.	affirmed
Reading R.R. Co. v. Pennsylvania I	232 (1873)	Strong	none	none	Pa.	reversed
Erie R.R. Co. v. Pennsylvania I	282 (1873)	Strong	none	none	Pa.	reversed
Reading R.R. Co. v. Pennsylvania II	284 (1873)	Strong	none	Miller	Pa.	affirmed
Eire R.R. Co. v. Pennsylvania II	300 (1873)	Field	none	none	Pa.	reversed
Fowler v. Rapley	328 (1873)	Clifford	none	none	Sup. Ct. D.C.	affirmed
United States v. Thomas	337 (1873)	Bradley	none	Miller	C.C.M.D. Tenn.	affirmed
Town of Grand Chute v. Winegar I	355 (1873)	Hunt	none	none	C.C.E.D. Wis.	affirmed
Town of Grand Chute v. Winegar II	373 (1873)	Hunt	none	none	C.C.E.D. Wis.	affirmed
Kimball v. West	377 (1873)	Miller	none	none	C.C.D. Mo.	affirmed
Pennywit v. Eaton I	380 (1873)	Chase	none	none	Ark.	dismissal denied
Pennywit v. Eaton II	382 (1873)	Chase	none	none	Ark.	affirmed
Ex parte Roberts	384 (1873)	Chase	none	none	Ct. Cl.	mandamus granted
Moses v. Mayor	387 (1873)	Chase	none	none	Ala.	dismissed
City of Davenport v. Dows	390 (1873)	Chase	none	none	C.C.D. Iowa	advancement denied
Hall v. Jordan	393 (1873)	Chase	none	none	Tenn.	dismissal denied
Montgomery v. United States	395 (1873)	Strong	none	none	Ct. Cl.	affirmed
Washington & G.R.R. Co. v. Gladmon	401 (1873)	Hunt	none	none	Sup. Ct. D.C.	affirmed
Tiffany v. Lucas	410 (1873)	Davis	none	none	C.C.D. Mo.	affirmed
Graham v. Norton	427 (1873)	Chase	Bradley	none	C.C.D. La.	reversed
City of Richmond v. Smith	429 (1873)	Clifford	none	Bradley	C.C.D. Va.	affirmed
Hanauer v. Woodruff	439 (1873)	Field	Miller	none	C.C.E.D. Ark.	certification
Flanders v. Tweed	450 (1873)	Clifford	none	none	C.C.D. La.	reversed
Tomlinson v. Jessup	454 (1873)	Field	none	none	C.C.D.S.C.	reversed
Tomlinson v. Branch	460 (1873)	Bradley	none	none	C.C.D.S.C.	reversed
City of Charleston v. Branch	470 (1873)	Bradley	none	none	C.C.D.S.C.	reversed
Prout v. Roby	471 (1873)	Swayne	none	none	Sup. Ct. D.C.	affirmed
Miller v. New York	478 (1873)	Clifford	none	Bradley	N.Y. Sup. Ct.	affirmed
Holyoke Co. v. Lyman	500 (1873)	Clifford	none	none	Mass.	affirmed
The Nitro-Glycerine Case	524 (1873)	Field	none	none	C.C.D. Cal.	affirmed
Deitsch v. Wiggins	539 (1873)	Strong	none	none	Sup. Ct. Terr. Colo.	reversed
Hannewinkle v. City of Georgetown	547 (1873)	Hunt	none	none	Sup. Ct. D.C.	affirmed
Riggin v. Magwire	549 (1873)	Bradley	none	none	Mo.	affirmed
Frow v. De la Vega	552 (1873)	Bradley	none	none	C.C.W.D. Tex.	reversed
Alger v. Alston	555 (1873)	Miller	none	none	C.C.D. La.	reversed
Young v. Godbe	562 (1873)	Bradley	none	none	C.C.W.D. Tex.	reversed
Tensas Parish v. Britton	566 (1873)	Bradley	none	none	C.C.D. La.	reversed
Partridge v. Phoenix M.L. Ins. Co.	573 (1873)	Miller	none	none	C.C.D. Mo.	affirmed
Mutual L. Ins. Co. v. Terry	580 (1873)	Hunt	none	none	C.C.D. Kan.	affirmed
Brown v. Kennedy	591 (1873)	Strong	Davis	none	C.C.D. Kan.	affirmed
Holdane v. Sumner	600 (1873)	Bradley	none	none	C.C.D. La.	affirmed
Gunn v. Barry	610 (1873)	Swayne	none	none	Ga.	reversed
City of New Orleans v. Gaines	624 (1873)	Hunt	none	none	C.C.D. La.	report affirmed
Mead v. Thompson	635 (1873)	Strong	none	none	C.C.S.D.N.Y.	dismissed
Commercial Bank v. City of Rochester	639 (1873)	Miller	none	none	N.Y. Sup. Ct.	dismissed
Cammack v. Lewis	643 (1873)	Miller	none	none	Sup. Ct. D.C.	affirmed
New Orleans et al. R.R. Co. v. Hanning	649 (1873)	Hunt	none	none	C.C.D. La.	affirmed
United States v. Bennett	660 (1873)	Strong	none	none	C.C.S.D. Ohio	reversed
Merchants' M. Ins. Co. v. Lyman	664 (1873)	Miller	none	none	C.C.D. La.	reversed
Haffin v. Mason	671 (1873)	Davis	none	none	C.C.S.D.N.Y.	affirmed
The Lucille	676 (1873)	Hunt	none	none	C.C.D. Md.	affirmed
Burrows v. Marshal	682 (1873)	Clifford	none	none	C.C.D.N.C.	dismissed
Hampton v. Rouse	684 (1873)	Swayne	none	none	C.C.S.D. Miss.	amendment permitted
