= List of United States Supreme Court cases, volume 465 =

This is a list of all United States Supreme Court cases from volume 465 of the United States Reports:

| Case name | Citation | Date decided |
|---|---|---|
| Southland Corp. v. Keating | 465 U.S. 1 | 1984 |
| Pulley v. Harris | 465 U.S. 37 | 1984 |
| Migra v. Warren City Sch. Dist. Bd. of Ed. | 465 U.S. 75 | 1984 |
| Pennhurst State Sch. v. Halderman | 465 U.S. 89 | 1984 |
| McKaskle v. Wiggins | 465 U.S. 168 | 1984 |
| Antone v. Dugger | 465 U.S. 200 | 1984 |
| United Building & Construction Trades Council v. Mayor and Council of Camden | 465 U.S. 208 | 1984 |
| McCain v. Lybrand | 465 U.S. 236 | 1984 |
| Flanagan v. United States | 465 U.S. 259 | 1984 |
| Minn. State Bd. for Community Colleges v. Knight | 465 U.S. 271 | 1984 |
| Colorado v. Nunez | 465 U.S. 324 | 1984 |
| Dickman v. Comm'r | 465 U.S. 330 | 1984 |
| United States v. One Assortment of 89 Firearms | 465 U.S. 354 | 1984 |
| South Carolina v. Regan | 465 U.S. 367 | 1984 |
| Minnesota v. Murphy | 465 U.S. 420 | 1984 |
| Solem v. Bartlett | 465 U.S. 463 | 1984 |
| Dixson v. United States | 465 U.S. 482 | 1984 |
| NLRB v. Bildisco | 465 U.S. 513 | 1984 |
| Grove City College v. Bell | 465 U.S. 555 | 1984 |
| United States v. Doe | 465 U.S. 605 | 1984 |
| Consol. Rail Corp. v. Darrone | 465 U.S. 624 | 1984 |
| Solem v. Stumes | 465 U.S. 638 | 1984 |
| Lynch v. Donnelly | 465 U.S. 668 | 1984 |
| Heckler v. Mathews | 465 U.S. 728 | 1984 |
| Monsanto Co. v. Spray-Rite Serv. Corp. | 465 U.S. 752 | 1984 |
| Keeton v. Hustler Magazine, Inc. | 465 U.S. 770 | 1984 |
| Calder v. Jones | 465 U.S. 783 | 1984 |
| United States v. Weber Aircraft Corp. | 465 U.S. 792 | 1984 |
| United States v. Arthur Young & Co. | 465 U.S. 805 | 1984 |
| NLRB v. City Disposal Systems, Inc. | 465 U.S. 822 | 1984 |
| Kosak v. United States | 465 U.S. 848 | 1984 |
| Heckler v. Edwards | 465 U.S. 870 | 1984 |
| Blum v. Stenson | 465 U.S. 886 | 1984 |
| Heckler v. Blankenship | 465 U.S. 1301 | 1984 |
| Liles v. Nebraska | 465 U.S. 1304 | 1984 |
| Claiborne v. United States | 465 U.S. 1305 | 1984 |
