= Pike v. Bruce Church, Inc. =

- Supreme Court of the United States

Argued January 13, 1970 Decided March 2, 1970
- Full case name: Loren J. Pike v. Bruce Church, Inc.
- Citations: 397 U.S. 137 (more) 90 S. Ct. 844; 25 L. Ed. 2d 174; 1970 U.S. LEXIS 63

Holding
- The burden placed on interstate commerce by Arizona's law is unconstitutional because Arizona's interest in identifying the origin of cantaloupes is outweighed by the heavy cost of building and operating a packing plant in Arizona

Court membership
- Chief Justice Warren E. Burger Associate Justices Hugo Black · William O. Douglas; John M. Harlan II · William J. Brennan Jr. Potter Stewart · Byron White; Thurgood Marshall

Case opinion
- Majority: Stewart, joined by unanimous

Laws applied
- The Arizona Fruit and Vegetable Standardization Act

Pike v. Bruce Church, Inc., 397 U.S. 137 (1970), was a case in which the Supreme Court of the United States held that power of states to pass laws interfering with interstate commerce is limited when the law poses an undue burden on businesses.

== Background ==
An Arizona statute required that Arizona-grown cantaloupes advertise their state of origin on each package. Bruce Church, Inc. was an Arizona grower of high quality cantaloupes. Instead of packing them in Arizona, it transported them to nearby California facilities, where they were not labeled as grown in Arizona.

Arizona issued an order prohibiting Church from shipping uncrated cantaloupes from the Arizona ranch, and requiring that the cantaloupes be packed in Arizona and identified as coming from an Arizona packer. This would have cost Church $200,000 to pack a $700,000 crop.

The company then brought a suit in federal court to stop Arizona from enforcing the order prohibiting Church from shipping the cantaloupes.

== Opinion of the Court ==
State statutes that have a negative effect on interstate commerce are unconstitutional under the Dormant Commerce Clause. Justice Stewart used a balancing test.

Where the statute regulates evenhandedly to effectuate a legitimate local public interest, and its effects on interstate commerce are only incidental, it will be upheld unless the burden imposed on such commerce is clearly excessive in relation to the putative local benefits. If a legitimate local purpose is found, then the question becomes one of degree. And the extent of the burden that will be tolerated will, of course, depend on the nature of the local interest involved, and on whether it could be promoted as well with a lesser impact on interstate activities.

Applying this test to the Arizona statute, the court found it imposed too great of a burden to justify its benefits.

== See also ==
- List of United States Supreme Court cases
- List of United States Supreme Court cases, volume 397
- List of United States Supreme Court cases by the Burger Court
