= South-Central Timber Development, Inc. v. Wunnicke =

- Supreme Court of the United States

Argued February 29, 1984 Decided May 22, 1984
- Full case name: South-Central Timber Development, Inc. v. Wunnicke, Commissioner, Department of Natural Resources of Alaska, et al.
- Citations: 467 U.S. 82 (more) 104 S. Ct. 2237; 81 L. Ed. 2d 71; 1984 U.S. LEXIS 88; 52 U.S.L.W. 4631; 14 ELR 20548

Holding
- Although there is a clearly delineated federal policy, endorsed by Congress, imposing primary manufacture requirements as to timber taken from federal lands in Alaska for export from the United States or for shipment to other States, in order for a state regulation to be removed from the reach of the dormant Commerce Clause as being authorized by Congress, congressional intent must be unmistakably clear.

Court membership
- Chief Justice Warren E. Burger Associate Justices William J. Brennan Jr. · Byron White; Thurgood Marshall · Harry Blackmun; Lewis F. Powell Jr. · William Rehnquist; John P. Stevens · Sandra Day O'Connor

Case opinions
- Majority: White, joined by Burger, Brennan, Blackmun, Powell, Stevens (Parts I, II)
- Plurality: White, joined by Brennan, Blackmun, Stevens (Parts III, IV)
- Concurrence: Brennan
- Concurrence: Powell, joined by Burger
- Dissent: Rehnquist, joined by O'Connor
- Marshall took no part in the consideration or decision of the case.

Laws applied
- U.S. Const. Art. I § 8

South-Central Timber Development v. Wunnicke, 467 U.S. 82 (1984), was a United States Supreme Court case in which the Court held unconstitutional Alaska's inclusion of a requirement that purchasers of state-owned timber process it within state before it was shipped out of state. According to a plurality opinion by Justice White, Alaska could not impose "downstream" conditions in the timber-processing market as a result of its ownership of the timber itself. The opinion summarized "[the] limit of the market-participant doctrine" as "allowing a State to impose burdens on commerce within the market in which it is a participant, but [to] go no further. The State may not impose conditions [that] have a substantial regulatory effect outside of that particular market."

== Case Facts ==
The Alaska Department of Natural Resources published a notice stating it would be selling timber owned by the State of Alaska. The State acted as a market participant by including a provision in a contract of sale that required all purchasers of the State's timber to partially process the timber before shipping any of it out of Alaska. The South-Central Timber Development, Inc. contended saying the provision violated the commerce clause. The corporation normally purchases timber and ships it elsewhere to be processed. The Alaska Court of Appeals found that Congress had authorized the State of Alaska's processing requirement in the sale contract.

== Issue and Rule ==
The issue in question was whether the State of Alaska's restriction on processing was, in fact, exempt from the commerce clause because of the "market-participant" doctrine. The court held that it was not exempt. However, the dissenting opinion was that the State of Alaska was only paying the purchaser of timber indirectly to hire residents to process the timber, which would not be a violation of the commerce clause.
