= Cooley v. Board of Wardens =

- Supreme Court of the United States

Argued February 9–11, 1852 Decided March 2, 1852
- Full case name: Aaron B. Cooley, Plaintiff in Error v. The Board of Wardens of the Port of Philadelphia, to the use of the Society for the Relief of Distressed Pilots, their Widows and Children, Defendants
- Citations: 53 U.S. 299 (more) 12 How. 299; 13 L. Ed. 996

Holding
- The Commerce Clause extends to laws related to pilotage. State laws related to commerce powers can be valid if Congress is silent on the matter.

Court membership
- Chief Justice Roger B. Taney Associate Justices John McLean · James M. Wayne; John Catron · John McKinley; Peter V. Daniel · Samuel Nelson; Robert C. Grier · Benjamin R. Curtis

Case opinions
- Majority: Curtis, joined by Taney, Catron, Nelson, Grier
- Concurrence: Daniel
- Dissent: McLean, joined by Wayne
- McKinley took no part in the consideration or decision of the case.

Laws applied
- Commerce Clause

Cooley v. Board of Wardens, 53 U.S. (12 How.) 299 (1852), was a US Supreme Court case that held that a Pennsylvania law requiring all ships entering or leaving Philadelphia to hire a local pilot did not violate the Commerce Clause of the US Constitution. Those who did not comply with the law had been required to pay a fee.

Benjamin R. Curtis wrote for the majority, "It is the opinion of a majority of the court that the mere grant to Congress of the power to regulate commerce, did not deprive the States of power to regulate pilots, and that although Congress had legislated on this subject, its legislation manifests an intention, with a single exception, not to regulate this subject, but to leave its regulation to the several states."

The legal historian Charles W. McCurdy viewed Cooley as a defining case, which clarified the Court's hitherto-contradictory jurisprudence on state powers over interstate commerce. David Currie said Curtis' interpretation of the commerce clause remained definitive for nearly a century after Cooley was decided.

== See also ==
- List of United States Supreme Court cases, volume 53
- Tenth Amendment to the United States Constitution
