= Market participant =

The term market participant is another term for economic agent, an actor and more specifically a decision maker in a model of some aspect of the economy. For example, buyers and sellers are two common types of agents in partial equilibrium models of a single market. The term market participant is also used in United States constitutional law to describe a U.S. State which is acting as a producer or supplier of a marketable good or service.

== US constitutional law ==
When a state is acting in such a market role, it may permissibly discriminate against non-residents. This principle was established by the United States Supreme Court in Reeves, Inc. v. Stake, 447 U.S. 429 (1980), in which the Court upheld South Dakota's right to give South Dakota residents preferential treatment in the purchase of cement produced at a cement plant owned and operated by the state.

The Supreme Court previously held, "Nothing in the purposes animating the Commerce Clause prohibits a State, in the absence of congressional action, from participating in the market and exercising the right to favor its own citizens over others." Hughes v. Alexandria Scrap Corp., 426 U.S. 794 (1976).

In Reeves, 447 U.S. 429 (1980), the Court relied upon "the long recognized right of trader or manufacturer, engaged in an entirely private business, freely to exercise his own independent discretion as to parties with whom he will deal."

"There are some limits on a state or local government's ability to impose restrictions that reach beyond the immediate parties with which the government transacts business." White v. Massachusetts Council of Construction Employers, Inc., 460 U.S. 204 (1983).

"The limit on the Market Participant Exception is that it allows a State to impose burdens on commerce within the market in which it is a participant but allows it to go no further. The State may not impose conditions, whether by statute, regulation, or contract, that have a substantial regulatory effect outside of that particular market." "Downstream restrictions have a greater regulatory effect than do limitations on the immediate transaction. The State may not avail itself of the market-participant doctrine to immunize its downstream regulation of a market it is not actually a participant."

The most ubiquitous example of a service offered by the individual states is the operation of public universities. Because the provision of higher education is deemed not to be a fundamental right, the individual states that have universities may charge higher tuition to out-of-state students. Appellate courts in California, Idaho, and Colorado have upheld the constitutionality of out-of-state student tuition rules.

By contrast, discriminatory practices in the provision of essential public services, such as welfare, police protection, and primary education, would violate the Privileges and Immunities Clause, and discriminatory practices when the state is acting as regulator rather than market participant would violate the dormant commerce clause.

== Investing ==
In finance, market participants are traders or investors who buy and sell securities or commodities in a structured market.

== See also ==
- Economic agent
