= 2006 term opinions of the Supreme Court of the United States =

October 2006 to October 2007 opinions

The 2006 term of the Supreme Court of the United States began October 2, 2006, and concluded September 30, 2007. The table illustrates which opinion was filed by each justice in each case and which justices joined each opinion.

== Table key ==
Delivered the court's opinion

Joined the court's opinion

Filed a concurrence

Joined a concurrence

Filed a dissent

Joined a dissent

Filed a concurrence/dissent

Joined a concurrence/dissent

Did not participate in the decision
- Decisions that do not note an argument date were decided without oral argument. Decisions that do not note a justice delivering the court's opinion are per curiam.
- Multiple concurrences and dissents within a case are numbered, with joining votes numbered accordingly. Justices frequently join multiple opinions in a single case; each vote is subdivided accordingly.
- An asterisk ( * ) in the court's opinion denotes that it was only a majority in part or a plurality. An asterisk in a joining vote denotes that the justice joined it only in part.
- A dash ( - ) denotes that the justice voted without filing or joining an opinion.

== 2006 term opinions ==
#	Case name and citation	Argued	Decided	Roberts	Stevens	Scalia	Kennedy	Souter	Thomas	Ginsburg	Breyer	Alito
1	Purcell v. Gonzalez, 549 U.S. 1		October 20, 2006									
2	Ayers v. Belmontes, 549 U.S. 7	October 3, 2006	November 13, 2006									
3	Lopez v. Gonzales, 549 U.S. 47	October 3, 2006	December 5, 2006									
4	Toledo-Flores v. United States, 549 U.S. 69	October 3, 2006	December 5, 2006									
5	Carey v. Musladin, 549 U.S. 70	October 11, 2006	December 11, 2006		1		2	3				
6	BP America Production Co. v. Burton, 549 U.S. 84	October 4, 2006	December 11, 2006									
7	United States v. Resendiz-Ponce, 549 U.S. 102	October 10, 2006	January 9, 2007									
8	MedImmune, Inc. v. Genentech, Inc., 549 U.S. 118	October 4, 2006	January 9, 2007									
9	Burton v. Stewart, 549 U.S. 147		January 9, 2007									
10	Norfolk Southern R. Co. v. Sorrell, 549 U.S. 158	October 10, 2006	January 10, 2007			1		1		2		1
11	Gonzales v. Duenas-Alvarez, 549 U.S. 183	December 5, 2006	January 17, 2007		*							
12	Jones v. Bock, 549 U.S. 199	October 30, 2006	January 22, 2007									
13	Osborn v. Haley, 549 U.S. 225	October 30, 2006	January 22, 2007					* / 1			* / 2	
14	Cunningham v. California, 549 U.S. 270	October 11, 2006	January 22, 2007				1 / 2				1 / 2	2
15	Weyerhaeuser Co. v. Ross-Simmons Hardwood Lumber Co., 549 U.S. 312	November 28, 2006	February 20, 2007									
16	Lawrence v. Florida, 549 U.S. 327	October 31, 2006	February 20, 2007									
17	Philip Morris USA v. Williams, 549 U.S. 346	October 31, 2006	February 20, 2007		1	3			2 / 3	3		
18	Marrama v. Citizens Bank of Massachusetts, 549 U.S. 365	November 6, 2006	February 21, 2007									
19	Wallace v. Kato, 549 U.S. 384	November 6, 2006	February 21, 2007									
20	Whorton v. Bockting, 549 U.S. 406	November 1, 2006	February 28, 2007									
21	Sinochem Int'l Co. v. Malaysia Int'l Shipping Corp., 549 U.S. 422	January 9, 2007	March 5, 2007									
22	Lance v. Coffman, 549 U.S. 437		March 5, 2007									
23	Travelers Casualty & Surety Co. v. Pacific Gas & Elec. Co., 549 U.S. 443	January 16, 2007	March 20, 2007									
24	Rockwell Int'l Corp. v. United States, 549 U.S. 457	December 5, 2006	March 27, 2007									
25	Limtiaco v. Camacho, 549 U.S. 483	January 8, 2007	March 27, 2007		*			*		*		*
26	Massachusetts v. EPA, 549 U.S. 497	November 29, 2006	April 2, 2007	1 / 2		1 / 2			1 / 2			1 / 2
27	Environmental Defense v. Duke Energy Corp., 549 U.S. 561	November 1, 2006	April 2, 2007						*			
28	Watters v. Wachovia Bank, N. A., 550 U.S. 1	November 29, 2006	April 17, 2007									
29	Global Crossing Telecomm. v. Metrophones Telecomm., 550 U.S. 45	October 10, 2006	April 17, 2007			1			2			
30	Zuni Public School District No. 89 v. Department of Education, 550 U.S. 81	January 10, 2007	April 17, 2007	1	1	1	2	1* / 2	1			2
31	Gonzales v. Carhart, 550 U.S. 124	November 8, 2006	April 18, 2007									
32	James v. United States, 550 U.S. 192	November 7, 2006	April 18, 2007		1	1			2	1		
33	Abdul-Kabir v. Quarterman, 550 U.S. 233	January 17, 2007	April 25, 2007	1		1 / 2			1 / 2			1 / 2*
34	Brewer v. Quarterman, 550 U.S. 286	January 17, 2007	April 25, 2007	1		1 / 2			1 / 2			1 / 2*
35	Smith v. Texas, 550 U.S. 297	January 17, 2007	April 25, 2007									
36	United Haulers Assn. v. Oneida-Herkimer Solid Waste Mgmt. Auth., 550 U.S. 330	January 8, 2007	April 30, 2007	*		1			2			
37	Scott v. Harris, 550 U.S. 372	February 26, 2007	April 30, 2007							1	2	
38	KSR Int'l Co. v. Teleflex Inc., 550 U.S. 398	November 28, 2006	April 30, 2007									
39	EC Term of Years Trust v. United States, 550 U.S. 429	February 26, 2007	April 30, 2007									
40	Microsoft Corp. v. AT&T Corp., 550 U.S. 437	February 21, 2007	April 30, 2007							*		
41	Schriro v. Landrigan, 550 U.S. 465	January 9, 2007	May 14, 2007									
42	Hinck v. United States, 550 U.S. 501	April 23, 2007	May 21, 2007									
43	Office of Senator Mark Dayton v. Hanson, 550 U.S. 511	April 24, 2007	May 21, 2007									
44	Winkelman v. Parma City School District, 550 U.S. 516	February 27, 2007	May 21, 2007									
45	Bell Atlantic Corp. v. Twombly, 550 U.S. 544	November 27, 2006	May 21, 2007							*		
46	Roper v. Weaver, 550 U.S. 598	March 21, 2007	May 21, 2007									
47	Los Angeles County v. Rettele, 550 U.S. 609		May 21, 2007					-				
48	Ledbetter v. Goodyear Tire & Rubber Co., 550 U.S. 618	November 27, 2006	May 29, 2007									
49	Uttecht v. Brown, 551 U.S. 1	April 17, 2007	June 4, 2007		1			1 / 2		1	1 / 2	
50	Safeco Insurance Co. of America v. Burr, 551 U.S. 47	January 16, 2007	June 4, 2007		* / 1	*			* / 2	* / 1		* / 2
51	Sole v. Wyner, 551 U.S. 74	April 17, 2007	June 4, 2007									
52	Claiborne v. United States, 551 U.S. 87	February 20, 2007	June 4, 2007									
53	Erickson v. Pardus, 551 U.S. 89		June 4, 2007			-						
54	Beck v. PACE Int'l. Union, 551 U.S. 96	April 24, 2007	June 11, 2007									
55	Fry v. Pliler, 551 U.S. 112	March 20, 2007	June 11, 2007		* / 1			* / 1		* / 1	* / 1* / 2	
56	United States v. Atlantic Research Corp., 551 U.S. 128	April 23, 2007	June 11, 2007									
57	Watson v. Philip Morris Cos., 551 U.S. 142	April 25, 2007	June 11, 2007									
58	Long Island Care at Home, Ltd. v. Coke, 551 U.S. 158	April 16, 2007	June 11, 2007									
59	Davenport v. Washington Ed. Assn., 551 U.S. 177	January 10, 2007	June 14, 2007	*							*	*
60	Permanent Mission of India to the United Nations v. City of New York, 551 U.S. 193	April 24, 2007	June 14, 2007									
61	Bowles v. Russell, 551 U.S. 205	March 26, 2007	June 14, 2007									
62	Powerex Corp. v. Reliant Energy Services, Inc., 551 U.S. 224	April 16, 2007	June 18, 2007									
63	Brendlin v. California, 551 U.S. 249	April 23, 2007	June 18, 2007									
64	Credit Suisse Securities (USA) LLC v. Billing, 551 U.S. 264	March 27, 2007	June 18, 2007									
65	Tenn. Secondary Sch. Athletic Assn. v. Brentwood Academy, 551 U.S. 291	April 18, 2007	June 21, 2007	* / 1	*	* / 1	* / 1		2			* / 1
66	Tellabs, Inc. v. Makor Issues & Rights, Ltd., 551 U.S. 308	March 28, 2007	June 21, 2007			1						2
67	Rita v. United States, 551 U.S. 338	February 20, 2007	June 21, 2007		1	* / 2			* / 2	1*		
68	Morse v. Frederick, 551 U.S. 393	March 19, 2007	June 25, 2007				2		1			2
69	Federal Election Commission v. Wisconsin Right to Life, 551 U.S. 449	April 25, 2007	June 25, 2007	*		* / 1	* / 1		* / 1			2
70	Wilkie v. Robbins, 551 U.S. 537	March 19, 2007	June 25, 2007		*					*		
71	Hein v. Freedom From Religion Foundation, Inc., 551 U.S. 587	February 28, 2007	June 25, 2007			1	2		1			*
72	National Assn. of Home Builders v. Defenders of Wildlife, 551 U.S. 644	April 17, 2007	June 25, 2007		1			1		1	1 / 2	
73	Parents Involved in Community Schools v. Seattle Sch. Dist. No. 1, 551 U.S. 701	December 4, 2006	June 28, 2007	*	1 / 2		* / 1	2	2	2	2	
74	Leegin Creative Leather Products, Inc. v. PSKS, Inc., 551 U.S. 877	March 26, 2007	June 28, 2007									
75	Panetti v. Quarterman, 551 U.S. 930	April 18, 2007	June 28, 2007									
#	Case name and citation	Argued	Decided	Roberts	Stevens	Scalia	Kennedy	Souter	Thomas	Ginsburg	Breyer	Alito

== 2006 term membership and statistics ==
This was the second term of Chief Justice Roberts' tenure and the first full term with the same membership; Justice Alito joined the Court during the 2005 term.

=== Membership, opinions delivered, and frequency in majority ===
Justice		Appointment history		Agreement with judgment		Opinions filed				
Seniority	Name	President	Date confirmed	%	#					Total
Chief Justice	John Roberts	George W. Bush	September 29, 2005	88.9%	64/72	7	1	0	3	11
Associate Justice	John Paul Stevens	Gerald Ford	December 19, 1975	62.7%	47/75	7	8	2	14	31
Associate Justice	Antonin Scalia	Ronald Reagan	September 26, 1986	78.7%	59/75	8	6	1	9	24
Associate Justice	Anthony Kennedy	Ronald Reagan	February 18, 1988	97.3%	72/74	8	6	0	1	15
Associate Justice	David Souter	George H. W. Bush	October 9, 1990	74.7%	56/75	7	3	2	5	17
Associate Justice	Clarence Thomas	George H. W. Bush	October 23, 1991	77%	57/74	8	8	0	8	24
Associate Justice	Ruth Bader Ginsburg	Bill Clinton	August 10, 1993	72%	54/75	7	2	1	4	14
Associate Justice	Stephen Breyer	Bill Clinton	August 3, 1994	74%	54/73	8	2	3	6	19
Associate Justice	Samuel Alito	George W. Bush	January 31, 2006	86.7%	65/75	7	4	0	4	15
Notes on statistics: Opinion counts only include the bench opinions listed above; opinions relating to orders or in-chambers opinions are not included.; Agreement with the Court's judgment does not guarantee agreement with the reasoning expressed in its opinion. A justice is not considered in agreement if they dissented even in part. Agreement percentages are based only on the listed cases in which a justice participated and are rounded to the nearest one-tenth of one percentage point.						Totals				
Notes on statistics: Opinion counts only include the bench opinions listed above; opinions relating to orders or in-chambers opinions are not included.; Agreement with the Court's judgment does not guarantee agreement with the reasoning expressed in its opinion. A justice is not considered in agreement if they dissented even in part. Agreement percentages are based only on the listed cases in which a justice participated and are rounded to the nearest one-tenth of one percentage point.						67	40	9	54	170

=== Justice-to-justice concordance ===
	Roberts	Stevens	Scalia	Kennedy	Souter	Thomas	Ginsburg	Breyer	Alito	Most concordant justice	Least concordant justice
Chief Justice John Roberts	xx	58.8%	91.2%	86.6%	72.1%	84.6%	64.7%	66.2%	94.1%	Alito	Stevens
Associate Justice John Paul Stevens	58.8%	xx	56.3%	65.7%	80.3%	52.9%	88.7%	85.3%	59.2%	Ginsburg	Thomas
Associate Justice Antonin Scalia	91.2%	56.3%	xx	78.6%	67.6%	92.9%	64.8%	67.2%	87.3%	Thomas	Stevens
Associate Justice Anthony Kennedy	86.6%	65.7%	78.6%	xx	77.1%	78.3%	71.4%	76.5%	92.9%	Alito	Stevens
Associate Justice David Souter	72.1%	80.3%	67.6%	77.1%	xx	62.9%	85.7%	91.4%	67.6%	Breyer	Thomas
Associate Justice Clarence Thomas	84.6%	52.9%	92.9%	78.3%	62.9%	xx	60.0%	55.9%	84.3%	Scalia	Stevens
Associate Justice Ruth Bader Ginsburg	64.7%	88.7%	64.8%	71.4%	85.7%	60.0%	xx	90.0%	62.0%	Breyer	Thomas
Associate Justice Stephen Breyer	66.2%	85.3%	67.2%	76.5%	91.4%	55.9%	90.0%	xx	62.3%	Souter	Thomas
Associate Justice Samuel Alito	94.1%	59.2%	87.3%	92.9%	67.6%	84.3%	62.0%	62.3%	xx	Roberts	Stevens
Notes on statistics: The percentage at the intersection of two justices is the frequency with which they agreed upon a judgment, irrespective of the specific opinions joined.; Only bench opinions listed above are counted; opinions relating to orders and in-chambers opinions are not included.
