= Brooke Group Ltd. v. Brown & Williamson Tobacco Corp. =

- Supreme Court of the United States

Argued March 29, 1993 Decided June 21, 1993
- Full case name: Brooke Group Ltd. v. Brown & Williamson Tobacco Corp.
- Citations: 509 U.S. 209 (more) 113 S. Ct. 2578; 125 L. Ed. 2d 168

Holding
- Brown & Williamson is entitled to judgment as a matter of law because it did not engage in predatory pricing in violation of §2 of the Sherman Antitrust Act.

Court membership
- Chief Justice William Rehnquist Associate Justices Byron White · Harry Blackmun; John P. Stevens · Sandra Day O'Connor; Antonin Scalia · Anthony Kennedy; David Souter · Clarence Thomas

Case opinions
- Majority: Kennedy, joined by Rehnquist, O'Connor, Scalia, Souter, Thomas
- Dissent: Stevens, joined by White, Blackmun

Laws applied
- Clayton Act §2

Brooke Group Ltd. v. Brown & Williamson Tobacco Corp., 509 U.S. 209 (1993), was a United States Supreme Court case in which the court required that an antitrust plaintiff alleging predatory pricing must show not only changes in market conditions adverse to its interests, as a threshold matter, but must show on the merits that (1) the prices complained of are below an appropriate measure of its rival's costs, and (2) that the competitor had a reasonable prospect or a "dangerous probability" of recouping its investment in the alleged scheme.

== Background ==
At the time of the dispute, the U.S. cigarette industry was dominated by six manufacturers. Although the industry was highly concentrated and had few new entrants, market shares shifted substantially over time, with Philip Morris becoming the largest manufacturer while Liggett's share steadily declined and Brown & Williamson's share fluctuated.

In the early 1980s, declining cigarette demand and excess manufacturing capacity increased price competition. Liggett introduced low-priced generic cigarettes, which quickly gained market share, prompting competitors to respond with their own discount products and pricing strategies, including generic brands, larger cigarette packs, and volume rebates.

Brown & Williamson entered the discount cigarette market in 1984 by introducing its own generic cigarettes and offering volume rebates. A series of competing rebate increases between Liggett and Brown & Williamson drove net prices for generic cigarettes lower before both companies raised list prices and reduced rebates in 1985, ending the rebate competition.

== Trial history ==
Liggett alleged that Brown & Williamson's response to its successful generic products gave rise to the predatory pricing and price discrimination claims at issue. Liggett alleged that Brown & Williamson's escalating rebates drove its generic cigarette prices below cost as part of a predatory pricing strategy designed to force Liggett to raise its prices, reduce the competitiveness of generic cigarettes, and preserve supracompetitive profits on branded cigarettes. Liggett subsequently brought suit under § 2(a) of the Robinson–Patman Act, alleging that the discriminatory rebates were part of an unlawful predatory pricing scheme.

After a 115-day trial, a jury awarded Liggett $49.6 million in damages, which the trial court trebled to $148.8 million. The trial court later overturned the jury's verdict and ruled in favor of Brown & Williamson, finding that Liggett had not shown injury to competition. The case then went to the Fourth Circuit and the Supreme Court, both of which ruled in Brown & Williamson's favor.

== Supreme Court ==
The Brooke Group decision established that primary-line price discrimination claims must meet two requirement. First, plaintiffs must show that the challenged prices were below an "appropriate" measure of the defendant's costs. Second, a plaintiff must establish a likelihood of recoupment by showing a "reasonable prospect" or "dangerous probability" that the defendant will recover its losses from below-cost pricing. The Court's rationale for the price-cost and recoupment requirements was to avoid chilling procompetitive price cuts.

The Court concluded that, although tacitly coordinated predatory pricing by a noncollusive oligopoly was theoretically possible, it was unlikely in practice because firms would face substantial difficulties coordinating both the predatory pricing and recoupment phases without an express agreement. Since there is a high likelihood that any attempt by one oligopolist to discipline a rival by cutting prices will produce an outbreak of competition; and since a predator's present losses fall on it alone, while the later supracompetitive profits must be shared with every other oligopolist in proportion to its market share, including the intended victim. The Court attached considerable importance to the implausibility of tacit coordination among Brown & Williamson and the other cigarette manufacturers in concluding that Liggett had not established a reasonable prospect of recoupment.

Ultimately, Justice Kennedy, held that:

- There is no per se rule of nonliability under Robinson-Patman Act for predatory price discrimination when recoupment is alleged to take place through supracompetitive oligopoly pricing, but
- Competitor's alleged below-cost sales of generic cigarettes through discriminatory volume rebates did not create competitive injury in violation of Robinson-Patman Act.

== Analysis ==
Before Brooke Group, the Supreme Court had last addressed primary-line injury in Utah Pie Co. v. Continental Baking Co. (1967), a decision that had generated uncertainty over the standards governing such claims. Whereas Utah Pie permitted primary-line liability based largely on evidence of predatory intent and declining prices, Brooke Group required plaintiffs to prove both below-cost pricing and a reasonable prospect of recouping predatory losses through sustained supracompetitive pricing. Brooke Group was the Supreme Court's first Robinson–Patman Act predatory pricing decision since Utah Pie.

Scholars have argued that the limitations imposed by Brooke Group should be understood in light of the facts before the Court. Philip J. Weiser and C. Scott Hemphill have argued that Brooke Group involved alleged recoupment through an oligopolistic market structure without coordination among firms, which the Court viewed as making successful predation unlikely. They also argue that Brooke Group did not foreclose theories of recoupment based on reputation effects or other economic theories under which predatory pricing may be rational, and that the price-cost test permits consideration of different measures of cost beyond the average variable cost measure applied in the case.

=== Theoretical context ===
The economic theory of predatory pricing has long been debated. Early predatory pricing cases often relied on evidence of a firm's subjective intent, such as internal memoranda, rather than economic evidence. In 1975, scholars Phillip Areeda and Donald Turner proposed that predatory pricing should instead be evaluated using an objective cost-based standard, arguing that prices below average variable cost were a necessary indicator of predation. Their proposed test became highly influential, although economists disagreed over the appropriate measure of cost. Some, including F. M. Scherer, argued that prices below average total cost could also be predatory under certain circumstances. These competing approaches to measuring cost formed part of the broader economic debate over predatory pricing and were relevant to the issues before the Court in Brooke Group.

According to the Chicago School, predatory pricing is generally irrational because firms are unlikely to recoup the losses incurred from below-cost pricing. As a result, apparent instances of below-cost pricing were viewed by the Brooke Group court as more likely to reflect vigorous competition or errors in cost measurement than predatory conduct. During the 1980s, FTC Commissioners Mary Azcuenaga and Terry Calvani described successful predatory pricing as so economically implausible as to be either extremely rare or effectively nonexistent. In contrast to the Chicago School, other modern (Post-Chicago) theories have argued that predatory pricing could be a rational strategy where firms with greater financial resources could force less well-capitalized rivals from the market and later recoup their losses.

== Significance ==
Brooke Group established that primary-line Robinson–Patman Act plaintiffs must prove both below-cost pricing and a reasonable prospect of recoupment. Empirical research has found that plaintiff victories in primary-line Robinson–Patman Act cases declined following the decision. These requirements have made predatory pricing claims difficult to prove. The decision also expressed, in dicta, the view that predatory pricing was generally implausible.

One empirical study found that Robinson–Patman Act claims have become substantially less likely to succeed following Supreme Court decisions narrowing the statute's application. Commentators have identified other factors that may have contributed to the decline in Robinson–Patman Act litigation, including repeated decisions denying class certification in Robinson–Patman cases, the decline of independent retailers, and changes in retail competition associated with the growth of chain stores and online commerce.

== See also ==
- Weyerhaeuser Co. v. Ross-Simmons Hardwood Lumber Co. (applying the same analysis to "predatory buying")

== Works cited ==
- Baker, Jonathan B. (1994). "Predatory Pricing after Brooke Group: An Economic Perspective". Antitrust Law Journal. 62 (3): 585–603.
- Boudreaux, Donald J.; Elzinga, Kenneth G.; Mills, David E. (1995). "The Supreme Court's Predation Odyssey: From Fruit Pies to Cigarettes". Supreme Court Economic Review. 4: 57–93. doi:10.1086/scer.4.1147080.
- Hemphill, C. Scott; Weiser, Philip J. (2018). "Beyond Brooke Group: Bringing Reality to the Law of Predatory Pricing". Yale Law Journal. 127 (7): 2048–2074.
- Luchs, Ryan; Geylani, Tansev; Dukes, Anthony; Srinivasan, Kannan (2010). "The End of the Robinson-Patman Act? Evidence from Legal Case Data". Management Science. 56 (12): 2123–2133. doi:10.1287/mnsc.1100.1230.
- Sokol, D. Daniel (2015). "Analyzing Robinson-Patman" (PDF). George Washington Law Review. 83 (6): 2064–2100.
