= PLRA =

PLRA may refer to:

- Authentic Radical Liberal Party
- Prison Litigation Reform Act
