= List of United States Supreme Court cases, volume 550 =

This is a list of all the United States Supreme Court cases from volume 550 (2006–2007) of the United States Reports:

| Case name | Citation | Date decided |
|---|---|---|
| Watters v. Wachovia Bank, N.A. | 550 U.S. 1 | 2007 |
The mortgage business of a nationally-chartered bank, whether conducted by the bank itself or through the bank's operating subsidiary, is subject to Office of the Comptroller of the Currency's superintendence, and not to the licensing, reporting, and visitorial regimes of the several States in which the subsidiary operates.
| Global Crossing Telecommunications, Inc. v. Metrophones Telecommunications, Inc. | 550 U.S. 45 | 2007 |
Payphone operators have a private right to sue telephone carriers for failure to pay reimbursement required by the FCC under the Communications Act of 1934.
| Zuni Pub. Sch. Dist. v. Dept. of Educ. | 550 U.S. 81 | 2007 |
The statute authorizing the Federal Impact Aid Program permits the Secretary of Education to identify the school districts that should be "disregard[ed]" by looking to the number of the district’s pupils as well as to the size of the district’s expenditures per pupil.
| Gonzales v. Carhart | 550 U.S. 124 | 2007 |
| James v. United States | 550 U.S. 192 | 2007 |
Attempted burglary is a predicate felony under the federal Armed Career Criminal Act.
| United Haulers Ass'n, Inc. v. Oneida-Herkimer Solid Waste Management Auth. | 550 U.S. 330 | 2007 |
| Scott v. Harris | 550 U.S. 372 | 2007 |
| KSR Int'l Co. v. Teleflex Inc. | 550 U.S. 398 | 2007 |
| EC Term of Years Tr. v. United States | 550 U.S. 429 | 2007 |
A trust that has missed 26 U.S.C. §7426(a)(1)’s deadline for challenging a levy may not bring the challenge as a tax refund claim under 28 U.S.C. §1346(a)(1).
| Microsoft Corp. v. AT&T Corp. | 550 U.S. 437 | 2007 |
| Schriro v. Landrigan | 550 U.S. 465 | 2007 |
| Hinck v. United States | 550 U.S. 501 | 2007 |
The Tax Court is the exclusive forum for judicial review of claims about interest abatement under the Internal Revenue Code.
| Office of Sen. Mark Dayton v. Hanson | 550 U.S. 511 | 2007 |
| Winkelman v. Parma City School Dist. | 550 U.S. 516 | 2007 |
| Bell Atl. Corp. v. Twombly | 550 U.S. 544 | 2007 |
Parallel conduct alone, absent some evidence of agreement to engage in anti-competitive behavior, is not sufficient to prove a violation of Section 1 of the Sherman Act. A complaint must allege facts with sufficient specificity to state a claim for relief that is plausible, not merely conceivable, on its face.
| Roper v. Weaver | 550 U.S. 598 | 2007 |
| Los Angeles Cnty. v. Rettele | 550 U.S. 609 | 2007 |
The Fourth Amendment's prohibition against unreasonable searches and seizures was not violated when officers execute a valid warrant and act in a reasonable manner, even though the people in the home they searched were of a different race than the person described in the warrant and the officers ordered people out of bed at gunpoint while those people were nude and engaged in private, non-criminal activity: sleep.
| Ledbetter v. Goodyear Tire & Rubber Co. | 550 U.S. 618 | 2007 |
The equal pay for equal work discrimination charging period is triggered when a discrete unlawful practice takes place. A new violation does not occur, and a new charging period does not commence, upon the occurrence of subsequent non-discriminatory acts that entail adverse effects resulting from the past discrimination.
| Boumediene v. Bush | 550 U.S. 1301 | 2007 |
Foreign terrorism suspects held at the Guantanamo Bay Naval Base in Cuba have constitutional rights to challenge their detention in United States courts. Section 7 of the Military Commissions Act of 2006 is unconstitutional.
