= Holland v. Florida =

- Supreme Court of the United States

Argued March 1, 2010 Decided June 14, 2010
- Full case name: Albert Holland, Petitioner v. Florida
- Citations: 560 U.S. 631 (more) 130 S. Ct. 2549; 177 L. Ed. 2d 130

Case history
- Prior: 773 So. 2d 1065 (Fla. 2000); 916 So. 2d 750 (Fla. 2005)

Holding
- The statute of limitations for filing a habeas petition under AEDPA is subject to equitable tolling in appropriate cases.

Court membership
- Chief Justice John Roberts Associate Justices John P. Stevens · Antonin Scalia; Anthony Kennedy · Clarence Thomas; Ruth Bader Ginsburg · Stephen Breyer; Samuel Alito · Sonia Sotomayor

Case opinions
- Majority: Breyer, joined by Roberts, Stevens, Kennedy, Ginsburg, Sotomayor
- Concurrence: Alito (in part)
- Dissent: Scalia, joined by Thomas (all but Part I)

Laws applied
- Antiterrorism and Effective Death Penalty Act of 1996

Holland v. Florida, 560 U.S. 631 (2010), was a United States Supreme Court case in which the Court held that the statute of limitations for filing a habeas petition under the Antiterrorism and Effective Death Penalty Act is subject to equitable tolling in appropriate cases.

== Background ==
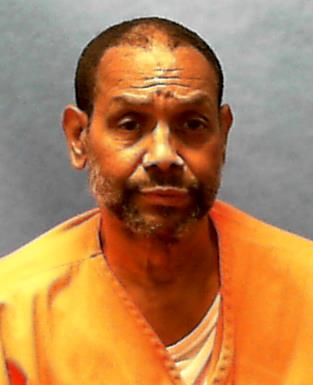
Albert Richard Holland

On July 29, 1990, Albert Holland attacked Thelma Johnson in Pompano Beach, Florida, rendering her semiconscious and inflicting severe head wounds. He ran off after a witness interrupted the attack, but was later found by K-9 patrol officer Scott Winters of the Pompano Beach Police Department. Holland grabbed Winters's gun and fatally shot Winters in the groin and lower stomach. Holland was later convicted of first-degree murder, armed robbery, attempted sexual battery, and attempted first-degree murder.

Holland was convicted of first-degree murder and sentenced to death in Florida state court. After the Florida Supreme Court affirmed on direct appeal and denied collateral relief, Holland filed a pro se federal habeas corpus petition, which was approximately five weeks late under the 1-year statute of limitations set forth in the Antiterrorism and Effective Death Penalty Act of 1996 (AEDPA), 28 U. S. C. §2244(d). Holland's court-appointed attorney, Bradley Collins, had failed to file a timely federal petition, despite Holland's many letters emphasizing the importance of doing so; Collins apparently did not do the research necessary to find out the proper filing date, despite the fact that Holland had identified the applicable legal rules for him. Collins failed to inform Holland in a timely manner that the Florida Supreme Court had decided his case, despite Holland’s many pleas for that information. Collins failed to communicate with Holland over a period of years, despite Holland's pleas for responses to his letters. Meanwhile, Holland repeatedly requested that the state courts and the Florida bar remove Collins from his case. Based on these and other record facts, Holland asked the federal District Court to toll the AEDPA limitations period for equitable reasons. It refused, holding that he had not demonstrated the due diligence necessary to invoke equitable tolling. Affirming, the Eleventh Circuit Court of Appeals held that, regardless of diligence, Holland's case did not constitute "extraordinary circumstances." Specifically, it held that when a petitioner seeks to excuse a late filing based on his attorney's unprofessional conduct, that conduct, even if grossly negligent, cannot justify equitable tolling absent proof of bad faith, dishonesty, divided loyalty, mental impairment, or the like.

The Supreme Court granted certiorari.

== Opinion of the court ==
Associate Justice Stephen Breyer authored the majority opinion.

== See also ==
- Lawrence v. Florida
