= Prison Litigation Reform Act =

U.S. federal law enacted in 1996

Prison Litigation Reform Act of 1995
- Acronyms (colloquial): PLRA

Legislative history
- Signed into law by President Bill Clinton on

United States Supreme Court cases
- List: Martin v. Hadix, 527 U.S. 343 (1999); Miller v. French, 530 U.S. 327 (2000); Booth v. Churner, 532 U.S. 731 (2001); Porter v. Nussle, 534 U.S. 516 (2002); Woodford v. Ngo, 548 U.S. 81 (2006); Jones v. Bock, 549 U.S. 199 (2007); Brown v. Plata, 563 U.S. 493 (2011); Coleman v. Tollefson, 575 U.S. 532 (2015); Bruce v. Samuels, 577 U.S. 82 (2016); Ross v. Blake, 578 U.S. 632 (2016); Murphy v. Smith, 583 U.S. 220 (2018); Lomax v. Ortiz-Marquez, 590 U.S. 595 (2020); Perttu v. Richards, 605 U.S. 460 (2025)

The Prison Litigation Reform Act (PLRA), 42 U.S.C. § 1997e, is a U.S. federal law that was enacted in 1996. Congress enacted PLRA in response to a significant increase in prisoner litigation in the federal courts; the PLRA was designed to decrease the incidence of litigation within the court system.

For the preceding 20 to 30 years, many US prisons and jails had been enjoined to make certain changes based on findings that the conditions of the institutions violated the constitutional rights of inmates (in particular, freedom from cruel and unusual punishment or the right to due process).

Many of the injunctions came as a result of consent decrees entered into between inmates and prison officials and endorsed by federal courts so relief was not necessarily tied to violations found. Many state officials and members of Congress had complained of the breadth of relief granted by federal judges, as the injunctions often required expensive remedial actions.

The PLRA was designed to curb the discretion of the federal courts in those types of actions. Thus, the central requirement of the act was a provision that a court "shall not grant or approve any prospective relief unless the court finds that such relief is narrowly drawn, extends no further than necessary to correct the violation of the Federal right, and is the least intrusive means necessary to correct the violation of the Federal right."

== "Automatic stay" section ==
The most pointed provision of the PLRA in this context is the so-called "automatic stay" section, which states that a motion to terminate prospective relief "shall operate as a stay" of that relief starting 30 days after the filing of the motion (extendable to up to 90 days for "good cause") and ending when the court rules on the motion.

In Miller v. French, 530 U.S. 327 (2000), inmates attacked the constitutionality of the "automatic stay" provision as a violation of separation of powers.

The Supreme Court reversed, 5–4, and held that the PLRA did not set aside a final judgment of a federal court. Rather, it operated to change the underlying law and so required the altering of the prospective relief issued under the old law. Also, the Court noted that separation of powers did not prevent Congress from changing applicable law and then imposing the consequences of the court's application of the new legal standard. Finally, the Court held that the stay provision did not interfere with core judicial functions, as it could not be determined whether the time limitations interfered with judicial functions by its relative brevity.

On the other hand, if the time limits interfered with the inmates' meaningful opportunity to be heard, that would be a due process problem. Since the decision below had been based on separation of powers, the due process argument was not before the Court. Thus, the constitutionality of the PLRA overall, and of the "automatic stay" in particular, is still undetermined, but the Court seems disposed to a measure of acceptance.

=== Exhaustion requirement ===
Another way Congress tried to curb prison litigation was by setting up an "exhaustion" requirement. Before prisoners may challenge a condition of their confinement in federal court, the PLRA requires them first to exhaust available administrative remedies by pursuing to completion whichever inmate grievance and/or appeal procedures their prison custodians provide:

No action shall be brought with respect to prison conditions under section 1983 of this title, or any other Federal law, by a prisoner confined in any jail, prison, or other correctional facility until such administrative remedies as are available are exhausted.

— 42 U.S.C. § 1997e(a)

That requirement was the subject of a Supreme Court case, Jones v. Bock.

The exhaustion requirement has been widely criticized as imposing an inequitable burden on prisoners. Exhaustion must be in accordance with the administrative remedies procedure applicable to the facility in which a prisoner is confined. The procedures vary by state law and facility policy.

== Injunctions ==
Some federal courts issue orders that certain prisoners and other pro se litigants cannot represent themselves in federal court. However, in 2011, the 11th Circuit ruled that prisoners are free to file any post-conviction claims through counselor by paying filing fees.

== See also ==
- Brown v. Plata (2011)
- U.S. v. Booker (2005)
