= Long Island Care at Home, Ltd. v. Coke =

- Supreme Court of the United States

Argued April 16, 2007 Decided June 11, 2007
- Full case name: Long Island Care at Home, Ltd., et al. v. Coke
- Docket no.: 06-593
- Citations: 551 U.S. 158 (more) 127 S. Ct. 2339; 168 L. Ed. 2d 54

Case history
- Prior: Case dismissed, Coke v. Long Island Care at Home, Ltd., 267 F. Supp. 2d 332 (E.D.N.Y. 2003); reversed, 376 F.3d 118 (2d Cir. 2004); vacated and remanded, 546 U.S. 1147 (2006); on remand, 462 F.3d 48 (2d Cir. 2006); cert. granted, 549 U.S. 1105 (2007).

Court membership
- Chief Justice John Roberts Associate Justices John P. Stevens · Antonin Scalia; Anthony Kennedy · David Souter; Clarence Thomas · Ruth Bader Ginsburg; Stephen Breyer · Samuel Alito

Case opinion
- Majority: Breyer, joined by unanimous

Long Island Care at Home, Ltd. v. Coke, 551 U.S. 158 (2007), is a US labor law case, concerning the minimum wage.

== Facts ==
Long Island Care at Home Ltd claimed that it did not need to pay its staff the minimum wage, despite the apparent meaning of the Fair Labor Standards Act of 1938 and its rules as clarified by the Department of Labor. It argued that this was true under the Fair Labor Standards Act 1938, 29 USC §213(a)(15) which exempted persons 'employed in domestic service employment to provide companionship services for individuals ... unable to care for themselves.' The Department of Labor's General Regulations §552.3 further stated this had to be the 'private home ... of the person by whom he or she is employed.'

== Judgment ==
Justice Breyer wrote for a unanimous court that Department of Labor's regulation was "valid and binding" and should have been given Chevron deference by the Second Circuit. The judgment of the Court of Appeals was reversed.
