= Credit Suisse First Boston (Europe) Ltd v Lister =

1998 UK labour law case

Credit Suisse Ltd v Lister
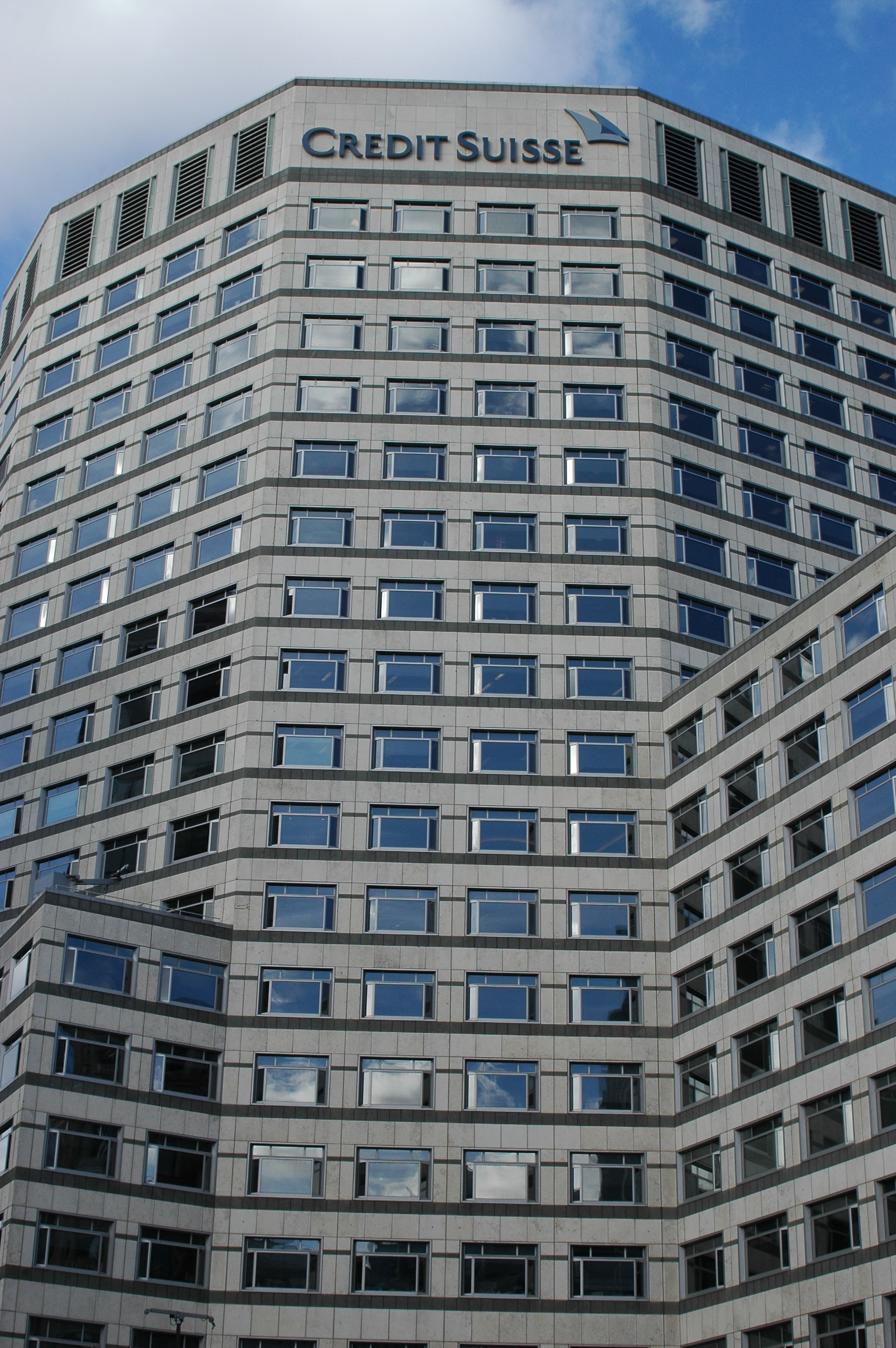
- Court: Court of Appeal
- Decided: 16 October 1998
- Citations: [1998] EWCA Civ 1551, [1999] ICR 794

Keywords
- Business transfer, TUPE

Credit Suisse First Boston (Europe) Ltd v Lister [1998] EWCA Civ 1551 is a UK labour law case, concerning the effects of a business transfer on an employee's rights at work.

== Facts ==
The transferee of the business that Mr Lister worked for, Credit Suisse, put a gardening clause into 209 employees’ new contracts. Mr Lister, who had been the head of European Equities, sought an injunction. The employees also had some advantageous new terms from the old ones under Barclays de Zoete Wedd.

== Judgment ==
Clarke LJ held that the gardening clause was contrary to the purpose of now TUPER 2006 regulation 4 and contrary to the purpose of the Business Transfers Directive.

== See also ==
- UK labour law
- Credit Suisse v. Billing
