= Sprint Communications Co. v. APCC Services, Inc. =

- Supreme Court of the United States

Decided June 23, 2008
- Full case name: Sprint Communications Co. v. APCC Services, Inc.
- Citations: 554 U.S. 269 (more)

Holding
- An assignee of a legal claim for money owed has standing to pursue that claim in federal court even when the assignee has promised to remit the proceeds of the litigation to the assignor.

Court membership
- Chief Justice John Roberts Associate Justices John P. Stevens · Antonin Scalia; Anthony Kennedy · David Souter; Clarence Thomas · Ruth Bader Ginsburg; Stephen Breyer · Samuel Alito

Case opinions
- Majority: Breyer, joined by Stevens, Kennedy, Souter, Ginsburg
- Dissent: Roberts, joined by Scalia, Thomas, Alito

Sprint Communications Co. v. APCC Services, Inc., 554 U.S. 269 (2008), was a United States Supreme Court case in which the court held that an assignee of a legal claim for money owed has standing to pursue that claim in federal court even when the assignee has promised to remit the proceeds of the litigation to the assignor.

== Background ==
In Global Crossing Telecommunications, Inc. v. Metrophones Telecommunications, Inc., the United States Supreme Court held that the Communications Act of 1934 creates a private right for payphone operators to sue telephone carriers for failure to pay reimbursement for calls that are required to be toll-free. However, because the cost of that sort of lawsuit is prohibitive, telephone operators began to assign their right to sue to billing and collection firms (aggregators) so that, in effect, these aggregators could bring suit on their behalf.

A payphone customer making a long-distance call with an access code or 1–800 number issued by a long-distance carrier pays the carrier (which completes the call). The carrier then compensates the payphone operator (which connects the call to the carrier in the first place). The payphone operator can sue the long-distance carrier for any compensation that the carrier fails to pay for these "dial-around" calls. A group of aggregators (including APCC Services) were assigned legal title to the claims of approximately 1,400 payphone operators. The aggregators separately agreed to remit all proceeds to those operators, who would then pay the aggregators for their services. After entering into these agreements, the aggregators filed federal-court lawsuits seeking compensation from long-distance carriers including Sprint Communications. The federal District Court refused to dismiss the claims, finding that the aggregators had standing, and the D.C. Circuit Court of Appeals affirmed.

== Opinion of the court ==
The Supreme Court issued an opinion on June 23, 2008.
