= Bruce v. Samuels =

- Supreme Court of the United States

Argued November 4, 2015 Decided January 12, 2016
- Full case name: Antoine Bruce, Petitioner v. Charles E. Samuels, Jr., et al.
- Docket no.: 14-844
- Citations: 577 U.S. 82 (more) 135 S. Ct. 2833; 192 L. Ed. 2d 874

Court membership
- Chief Justice John Roberts Associate Justices Antonin Scalia · Anthony Kennedy; Clarence Thomas · Ruth Bader Ginsburg; Stephen Breyer · Samuel Alito; Sonia Sotomayor · Elena Kagan

Case opinion
- Majority: Ginsburg, joined by unanimous

Laws applied
- Prison Litigation Reform Act of 1995

Bruce v. Samuels, 577 U.S. 82 (2016), was a United States Supreme Court case in which the Court held that the Prison Litigation Reform Act of 1995 requires prisoners to pay twenty percent of their prior month's income for each case they file. The Court rejected the petitioner's argument that prisoners were only required to pay a maximum of twenty percent of their monthly income, even if they file multiple cases.

== Opinion of the Court ==
Associate Justice Ruth Bader Ginsburg authored a unanimous decision.
