= Norfolk Southern Railway Co. v. Sorrell =

- Supreme Court of the United States

Decided January 10, 2007
- Full case name: Norfolk Southern Railway Co. v. Sorrell
- Citations: 549 U.S. 158 (more)

Holding
- The same causation standard applies to railroad negligence under Section 1 of the Federal Employers' Liability Act to employee contributory negligence under Section 3.

Court membership
- Chief Justice John Roberts Associate Justices John P. Stevens · Antonin Scalia; Anthony Kennedy · David Souter; Clarence Thomas · Ruth Bader Ginsburg; Stephen Breyer · Samuel Alito

Case opinions
- Majority: Roberts, joined by Stevens, Scalia, Kennedy, Souter, Thomas, Breyer, Alito
- Concurrence: Souter, joined by Scalia, Alito
- Concurrence: Ginsburg (in judgment)

Laws applied
- Federal Employers' Liability Act

Norfolk Southern Railway Co. v. Sorrell, 549 U.S. 158 (2007), was a United States Supreme Court case in which the court held that the same causation standard applies to railroad negligence under Section 1 of the Federal Employers' Liability Act to employee contributory negligence under Section 3.

== Background ==
Sorrell was injured while working for a railroad (Norfolk), and sought damages for his injuries in Missouri state court under the Federal Employers' Liability Act (FELA), which makes a railroad liable for an employee's injuries "resulting in whole or in part from [the railroad's] negligence," Section 1. FELA reduces any damages awarded to an employee "in proportion to the amount [of negligence] attributable to" the employee, Section 3. Missouri's jury instructions apply different causation standards to railroad negligence and employee contributory negligence in FELA actions. An employee will be found contributorily negligent if their negligence "directly contributed to cause" the injury, while railroad negligence is measured by whether the railroad's negligence "contributed in whole or in part" to the injury. After the trial court overruled Norfolk's objection that the instruction on contributory negligence contained a different standard than the railroad negligence instruction, the jury awarded Sorrell $1.5 million. The Missouri Court of Appeals affirmed, rejecting Norfolk's contention that the same causation standard should apply to both parties' negligence.

The Supreme Court granted certiorari.

== Opinion of the court ==
The Supreme Court issued an opinion on January 10, 2007.
