= Office of Senator Mark Dayton v. Hanson =

- Supreme Court of the United States

Argued April 24, 2007 Decided May 21, 2007
- Full case name: Office of Senator Mark Dayton, appellant v. Brad Hanson
- Docket no.: 06-618
- Citations: 550 U.S. 511 (more) 550 U.S. 511 (2007); 127 S. Ct. 2018; 167 L. Ed. 2d 898
- Argument: Oral argument
- Opinion announcement: Opinion announcement

Questions presented
- Does the Speech or Debate Clause of the U.S. Constitution bar federal court jurisdiction of suits under the Congressional Accountability Act of 1995 by congressional employees whose job duties are part of the due functioning of the legislative process?; Was the Office of Senator Mark Dayton entitled to appeal the judgment of the U.S. Court of Appeals for the District of Columbia Circuit directly to the Supreme Court?; Was the case rendered moot by the expiration of Senator Dayton's term of office?

Holding
- The court did not have jurisdiction under the Congressional Accountability Act of 1995 to review a wrongful termination suit brought against United States Senator Mark Dayton, where the lower courts did not rule on the constitutionality of the Act.

Court membership
- Chief Justice John Roberts Associate Justices John P. Stevens · Antonin Scalia; Anthony Kennedy · David Souter; Clarence Thomas · Ruth Bader Ginsburg; Stephen Breyer · Samuel Alito

Case opinion
- Majority: Stevens, joined by Scalia, Kennedy, Souter, Thomas, Ginsburg, Breyer, Alito
- Roberts took no part in the consideration or decision of the case.

Laws applied
- Congressional Accountability Act of 1995 (CAA) (Pub.L. 104–1)

Office of Senator Mark Dayton v. Hanson, 550 U.S. 511 (2007) is a United States Supreme court case in which the court held that it did not have jurisdiction under the Congressional Accountability Act of 1995 to review a wrongful termination suit brought against United States Senator Mark Dayton, where the lower courts did not rule on the constitutionality of the Act. This case was the first Speech or Debate Clause case the Supreme Court took up since 1979.

== Background ==
In 2002, Brad Hanson worked as a State Office Manager for Senator Mark Dayton's Fort Snelling, Minnesota office. Due to a heart problem, Hanson took a medical leave of absence. Upon informing his employer of his need for time off, Dayton said "You're done," and to take the leave. Dayton's Washington office later called Hanson and terminated him. Dayton claimed that Hanson was fired with cause because of his "exceptionally poor performance," including sleeping on the job, which Hanson denied.

Hanson sued under the Congressional Accountability Act of 1995 (CAA) for discrimination based on a perceived disability. The CAA applies 11 labor and employment laws to Congress from which it had previously exempted itself. Hanson said that his termination violated medical and disability laws, including the Americans with Disability Act of 1990 and the Family and Medical Leave Act of 1993. Hanson also sued for failure to pay overtime compensation.

Dayton's office filed a motion to have the case dismissed for lack of jurisdiction, claiming immunity to the suit under the Speech or Debate Clause of the Constitution. The Speech or Debate Clause, grounded in the separation of powers doctrine, prohibits judicial inquiry into the "legislative acts" of members of Congress. This shields lawmakers from lawsuits stemming from actions taken in the course of their official duties. The definition of "legislative acts" was at issue, particularly whether it includes the employment decisions of a Congressperson's office.

In an unreported decision and without oral argument, the district court denied Dayton's office's motion and held that the Speech or Debate Clause does not bar Hanson's claims. The Court of Appeals for the District of Columbia Circuit, sitting en banc, affirmed the district court's decision. D.C. Circuit Judge David S. Tatel, in one of three concurring opinions, wrote that the Speech or Debate Clause has “some role to play” in employment cases and that what the Clause precludes should be decided case-by-case.

== Supreme Court ==
Dayton's office filed a notice of appeal, arguing that appeal was the proper procedure to ask the Supreme Court to review the case. Alternatively, Dayton's office filed a jurisdictional statement and asked the court to accept the statement as a writ of certiorari. Dayton's office also argued that because Dayton's term of office ended in January 2007, the case was moot.

Under Jean Manning, the Office of the Senate Chief Counsel for Employment took a hardline stance against Hanson's lawsuit and sought to have it dismissed, arguing that the Speech and Debate Clause "provides absolute immunity" for a senator's personnel actions. Senate Majority Leader Harry Reid and Minority Leader Mitch McConnell disagreed with this position and passed a resolution ordering the Senate Legal Counsel to file an amicus brief in support of Hanson. Representatives Barney Frank and Christopher Shays also disagreed with the lawsuit, saying in a legal brief that Manning's arguments are "wrong and misunderstand both constitutional doctrine and the CAA."

The following questions were at issue in the case:

1. Does the Speech or Debate Clause of the U.S. Constitution bar federal court jurisdiction of suits under the Congressional Accountability Act of 1995 by congressional employees whose job duties are part of the due functioning of the legislative process?
2. Was the Office of Senator Mark Dayton entitled to appeal the judgment of the U.S. Court of Appeals for the District of Columbia Circuit directly to the Supreme Court?
3. Was the case rendered moot by the expiration of Senator Dayton's term of office?

The court only answered the second question at issue and did not reach the merits of the case. Justice John Paul Stevens authored the opinion of the 8-0 court, which held that it did not have jurisdiction to hear the case and declined to grant certiorari. The justices held that because the CAA only allows direct appeals to the Supreme Court for rulings on the constitutional validity of the statute, and the lower courts' ruling did not qualify as such, appeal was not authorized.

== Subsequent history ==
In February 2009, Hanson and Dayton reached a confidential settlement, one month after Dayton filed to run for governor of Minnesota. In October 2010, Minnesota Republican Party Chairman Tony Sutton and Deputy Chairman Michael Brodkorb called on Dayton to answer questions about the settlement, including whether public money was involved. The Dayton campaign released a statement: "The parties have reached a settlement, the terms of which are confidential. I will reimburse the U.S. Treasury for the full amount of the settlement to relieve taxpayers of any such burden. The terms of this agreement prohibit me from making any further statement regarding this action."

== See also ==
- Mark Dayton
- Congressional Accountability Act of 1995
- Speech or Debate Clause
- 2006 term opinions of the Supreme Court of the United States
- 2006 term United States Supreme Court opinions of John Paul Stevens

== Sources ==
- Jones, Barbara L. (2007). "Does the Speech or Debate Clause Bar a Discrimination Claim Against the Office of a Former Senator?" (PDF). Preview of United States Supreme Court Cases. 34 (7). American Bar Association: 397–401. Archived from the original (PDF) on December 29, 2020.
