= Cabilly patents =

Two biotechnology patents

The Cabilly patents are two US patents issued to Genentech and City of Hope which relate to the "fundamental technology required for the artificial synthesis of antibody molecules." The name refers to lead inventor Shmuel Cabilly, who was awarded the patent while working at City of Hope in the 1980s. There was ongoing legal controversy surrounding these patents since their original filing in 1983. In 2008, the litigation that was pending before the U.S. District Court for the Central District of California, was fully resolved and dismissed.

An interference between U.S. patent 4,816,567 (the original "Cabilly patent") co-issued to Genentech and City of Hope and U.S. patent 4,816,397 (the "Boss" patent) issued to Celltech resulted in the issuance of a second "Cabilly patent" to Genentech in 2001. This new patent would extend into 2018, an effective term of 29 years.

A lawsuit filed by MedImmune, a licensee of the Cabilly patent, resulted in the United States Supreme Court case MedImmune, Inc. v. Genentech, Inc. which was decided in favor of MedImmune. Following the supreme court decision, the United States Patent and Trademark Office (USPTO) declared Genentech's patent invalid, but Genentech appealed that decision to the USPTO. The patent remained valid and enforceable until the process was completed. Genentech's "Cabilly II" patent 6,331,415 was then found, after USPTO reexamination, to be enforceable. MedImmune and Centocor have settled with Genentech. Currently, two other challenges are in the courts. GlaxoSmithKline and Human Genome Sciences both are challenging the patent under antitrust law. This is based on the settlement between Genentech and Celltech and their dispute over the original Cabilly patent 4,816,567 and the Celltech's patent 4,816,397.

An important implication of this case is the affirmation that a licensee retains the right to challenge a licensed patent. The controversy has also called attention to the amount of time the USPTO takes to resolve Interference proceedings, and has been cited in arguments for changing to a First to file patent system.
