= Limtiaco v. Camacho =

- Supreme Court of the United States

Argued January 8, 2007 Decided March 27, 2007
- Full case name: Alicia G. Limtiaco, Attorney General of Guam, v. Felix P. Camacho, Governor of Guam
- Docket no.: 06-116
- Citations: 549 U.S. 483 (more)
- Argument: Oral argument
- Opinion announcement: Opinion announcement

Case history
- Prior: 2003 Guam 16
- Procedural: Writ of certiorari to the Supreme Court of Guam (Note: While the U.S. Court of Appeals for the Ninth Circuit had had the case submitted to it and had heard oral arguments in it, while it was deciding the outcome of the case, Congress stripped it of its jurisdiction.)

Holding
- Under the Organic Act of Guam, tax assessment value must be used to calculate Guam's debt ceiling, not market value.

Court membership
- Chief Justice John Roberts Associate Justices John P. Stevens · Antonin Scalia; Anthony Kennedy · David Souter; Clarence Thomas · Ruth Bader Ginsburg; Stephen Breyer · Samuel Alito

Case opinions
- Majority: Thomas, joined by Roberts, Scalia, Kennedy, Breyer
- Dissent: Souter, joined by Stevens, Ginsburg, Alito

Laws applied
- Guam Organic Act

Limtiaco v. Camacho (2007), (Note: Originally scheduled for argument in October 2006 as Moylan v. Camacho.) (Note: US: /ˈlɪmtiːɑːkoʊ ˈvərsɪs ˈkɑːmɑːtʃoʊ/) 549 U.S. 483, is a case of the United States Supreme Court which handled a complex taxation dispute between two Guamanian politicians—Douglas B. Moylan, Guam's first elected Attorney General, and Felix P. Camacho, then-Governor of Guam—involving the proper interpretation of the Guam Organic Act. Guam, an unincorporated territory of the United States, is governed by this Organic Act, a United States federal law passed in 1950; much case law in the territory is based on its interpretation.

The case focused on a seemingly narrow issue: whether for the purposes of the debt ceiling established in § 11 of the Guam Organic Act—ten percent of the value of real property in Guam—the real (market) value or tax (assessed) value was to be used to calculate the ceiling. Moylan argued that one must use the tax value (a considerably smaller number, as public buildings had a tax valuation of US$0), (Note: Guam uses the United States dollar as its currency.) while Camacho argued the appraisal value must be used instead.

In a 5–4 ruling, (Note: On the issue of whether the Supreme Court had jurisdiction, the justices were unanimous, yet on the issue of the meaning of the Guam Organic Act, split 5–4.) the Supreme Court reversed the decision of the Guam Supreme Court, finding for the Office of the Attorney General of Guam. While the case was originally brought by Moylan to promote fiscal conservatism, ironically, when it reached the Supreme Court of the United States, the minority remarked in its dissent that actually the Government of Guam could, sua sponte, sidestep the debt ceiling by doubling the assessed value of property while halving the tax rate of that same property in one Public Law, entirely contrary to Moylan's stated goals of enforcing federal sovereignty in the unincorporated territory. While the Court found this outcome unlikely, it was put into practice by Guam's government soon after the case was decided; by 2009, Guam had done so twice.

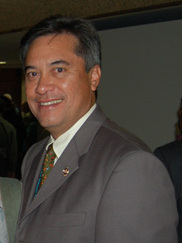
Felix Perez Camacho, Governor of Guam (2003–2011)

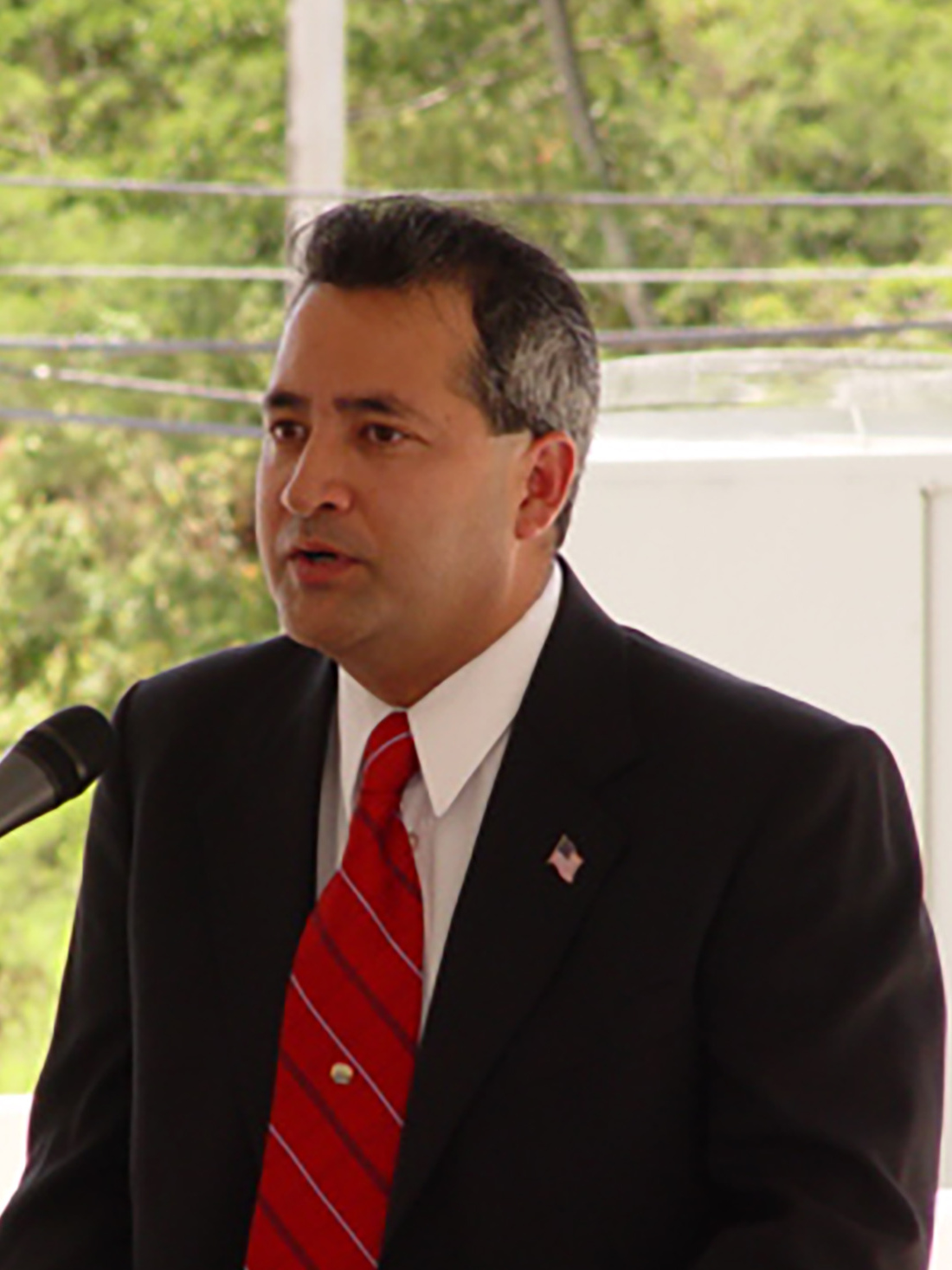
Douglas B. Moylan, Attorney General of Guam (2003–2006)

== Background ==
Organic Act of Guam (1950)

Guam Public Law 27-19 (2003)

Felix Perez Camacho was elected as the seventh Governor of Guam in 2003. Desiring to raise funds, he wished to issue bonds to investors backed by the Guamanian government, a common practice internationally.

To issue the bonds, which had been approved by the unicameral Guam Legislature in Public Law 27-19, (Note: PL 27-19 had the matter of the bonds as its raison d'être and began life as Bill 47 of 2003 in the Guam Legislature.) Camacho, a Republican, required the signature of Douglas Moylan, the then-Attorney General of Guam. Despite being in Camacho's party, as a fiscal conservative, Moylan did not wish to see that Guam take on more debt, and so refused to sign off on the bonds; Guamanian law requires that the Attorney General clear bond issuances as legal. Camacho filed suit against Moylan for his refusal—Moylan was Guam's first elected attorney general, and so could not be removed by the Governor from office as he could do with any other member of his Cabinet.

Moylan argued that the issuance was illegal as the Guam Organic Act includes within its text the following provision, limiting the amount of outstanding Guamanian bonds that can exist at any one time:

Taxes and assessments on property, internal revenues, sales, license fees, and royalties for franchises, privileges, and concessions may be imposed for purposes of the government of Guam as may be uniformly provided by the Legislature of Guam, and when necessary to anticipate taxes and revenues, bonds and other obligations may be issued by the government of Guam: Provided, however, That no public indebtedness of Guam shall be authorized or allowed in excess of 10 per centum of the aggregate tax valuation of the property in Guam. Bonds or other obligations of the government of Guam payable solely from revenues derived from any public improvement or undertaking shall not be considered public indebtedness of Guam within the meaning of this section.

— 48 U.S.C. § 1423a; emphasis not in original

The money from the bonds was intended to have funded, among other things: liabilities of the Guam Memorial Hospital; payment of fines due the Environmental Protection Agency due to the hazard posed by the Ordot Landfill and its cleanup (this issue would later lead to Guam v. United States); and handling the fallout of the previous year's Typhoon Pongsona (a category 4 typhoon which knocked out all electricity in Guam for several weeks).

== Case history ==
Camacho v. Moylan (2003 Guam 16)

=== In the Supreme Court of Guam ===
The case began on 1 July 2003 in the Supreme Court of Guam, where it received the full title In re: request of Governor Felix P. Camacho relative to the interpretation and application of section 11 of the Organic Act of Guam. Camacho requested a declaratory judgment from the Court without suing Moylan directly—a declaration that the bonds were in fact legal to issue and Moylan must therefore assent to their indenture. Moylan thereafter became a party in interest to the lawsuit at his request. Argument was heard only eight days later, on 9 July 2003.

On July 23, in an opinion penned by Chief Justice F. Philip Carbullido, the Court ruled for Camacho, dismissing Moylan's concern, and declared the issuance of the bonds legal.

Moylan appealed in a writ of certiorari to the United States Court of Appeals for the Ninth Circuit on 8 August 2003.

=== In the United States Court of Appeals for the Ninth Circuit ===
On 23 October 2003, the Court of Appeals for the Ninth Circuit accepted the appeal, titling the case Moylan v. Camacho. Oral argument was heard before the Ninth Circuit at the James R. Browning United States Court of Appeals Building in Honolulu, Hawaii on 6 May 2004.

==== In the Congress of the United States ====
While the case was pending a decision, the United States Congress amended the Guam Organic Act. However, Congress did not clarify the meaning of the statute in § 11. Instead, it stripped the appellate jurisdiction that the Ninth Circuit previously had over cases originating in the Guam Supreme Court; all such cases now could only be appealed to the Supreme Court of the United States. Congress, however, failed to clarify what it intended to happen when cases had already been submitted to and argued before the justices of the Ninth Circuit Court of Appeals. Among the affected cases was Moylan v. Camacho.

==== Santos v. Guam ====
Santos v. Guam (9th Cir. 2006)

Facing an unusual jurisdictional question, the Ninth Circuit decided to consolidate Moylan with an unrelated appeal, Anthony Duenas Santos v. The People of the Territory of Guam, for the purposes of determining whether it still had jurisdiction; Santos v. Guam faced the exact same jurisdictional question as Moylan v. Camacho, but was originally argued before the Ninth Circuit a week prior, on 30 April 2004 in Saipan, Northern Mariana Islands.

Upon a motion to expedite filed by Camacho on 8 December 2004, the Ninth Circuit's Judge Jerome Farris entered an order in Moylan on 15 December directing the parties to wait until it had ruled on Santos.

In Santos, the Ninth Circuit eventually ruled it lacked jurisdiction on 3 January 2006. Relying on that precedent, on 6 March 2006, the Ninth Circuit dismissed Moylan as well, citing its lack of jurisdiction.

=== In the Supreme Court of the United States ===
Originally titled Moylan v. Camacho when it was scheduled, due to the end of Moylan's term in December 2006, the Court would substitute the then-current AG of Guam in his place, Alicia G. Limtiaco, titling the case Limtiaco v. Camacho by the time it was argued.

The Supreme Court case is officially on a writ of certiorari to the Supreme Court of Guam, despite much more than ninety days elapsing between the decision by that Court and the filing of the writ.

== Decision ==
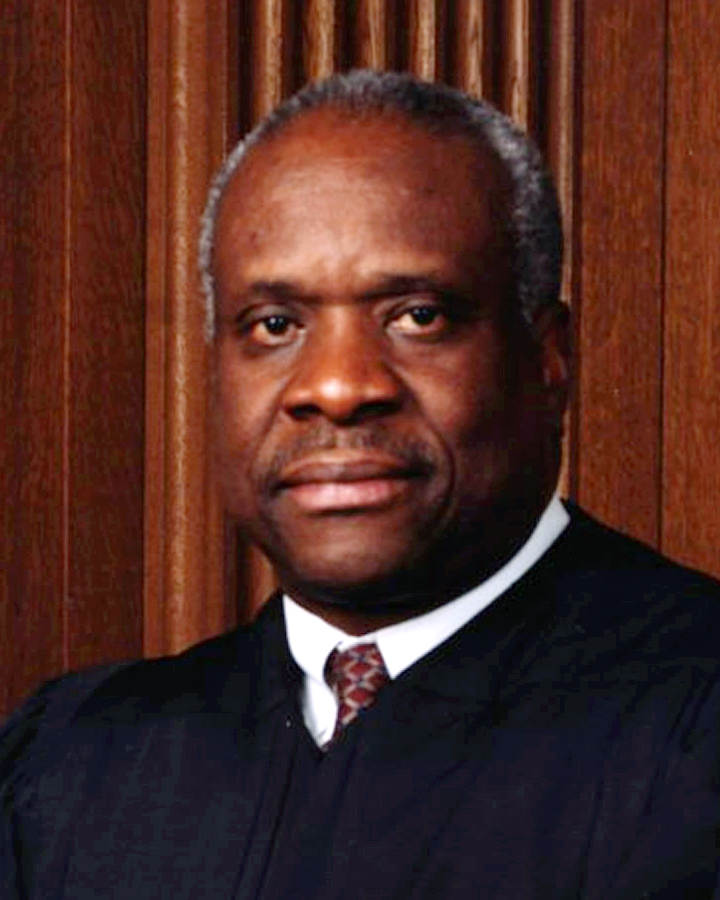

[T]he Governor mistakenly argues that we owe deference to the Guam Supreme Court's interpretation of its Organic Act. It may be true that we accord deference to territorial courts over matters of purely local concern. [...] This case does not fit that mold, however. The debt-limitation provision protects both Guamanians and the United States from the potential consequences of territorial insolvency. Thus, this case is not a matter of purely local concern. Of course, decisions of the Supreme Court of Guam, as with other territorial courts, are instructive and are entitled to respect when they indicate how statutory issues, including the Organic Act, apply to matters of local concern. On the other hand, the Organic Act is a federal statute, which we are bound to construe according to its terms.

— Justice Clarence Thomas

On 27 March 2007, more than four years after the initial events in Guam, the Supreme Court ruled for Moylan, reversing and remanding the case to the Supreme Court of Guam. On the question of whether it had jurisdiction, the Court was unanimous; ruling that while there is a ninety day period for the filing of writs of certiorari in 28 U.S.C. § 2101, extendable by sixty days upon the consent of the Court and application of one of the parties, the clock started when the Ninth Circuit dismissed Moylan v. Camacho and not when the Supreme Court of Guam ruled on the case due to the unusual jurisdictional circumstances of the case.

However, on the question of the meaning of § 11 of the Guam Organic Act, the Court split 5–4. Writing for the majority, Justice Clarence Thomas, joined by Chief Justice Roberts and Justices Scalia, Kennedy, and Breyer, upheld Moylan's understanding of § 11, dismissing concerns that it would lead to the debt ceiling in the statute passed by Congress becoming a statute without a purpose. The ruling of the Court was "almost exclusively semantic [and] textualist" in nature, setting aside the intentions of Congress for the lexical definitions of the words of the statute themselves, even if such interpretation could create a pointless statute in the right circumstances.

In his dissent, Justice David Souter, joined by Justices Stevens, Ginsburg, and Alito, argued that the Court's lack of interest in the intent of Congress would doom the debt ceiling statute to irrelevance and effectively erase it. To rule that the "tax value" is the assessed value of property would put the final decision on the amount of the debt ceiling in the hands of the Guam Legislature, making the whole federal statute trying to impose a Congressional limit on Guamanian debt "serve no purpose". The majority answered these criticisms by writing that "most States have long based their debt limitations on assessed value without incident".

== Aftermath ==
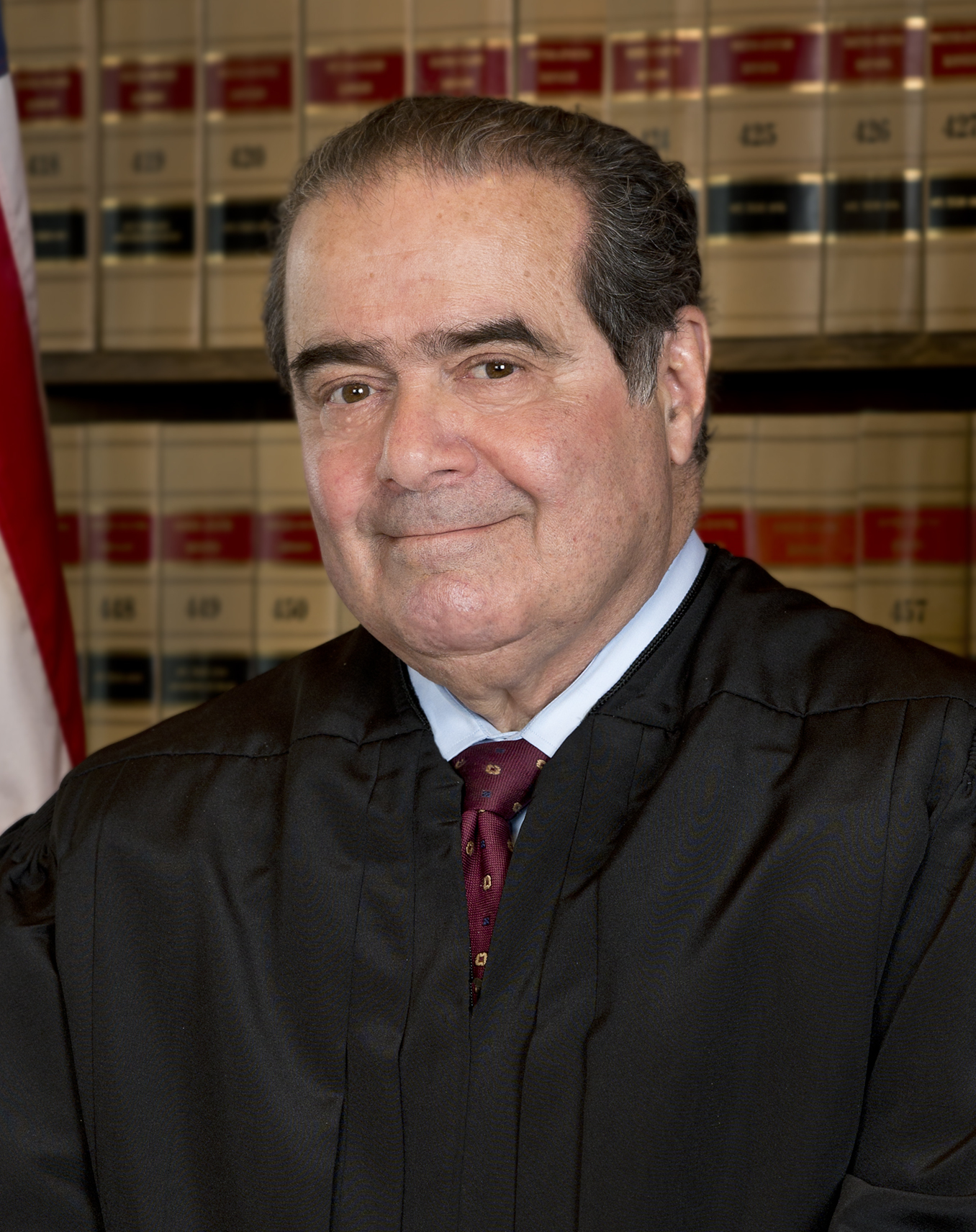

There's really much less to this case than meets the eye. I mean, Guam is going to be able to fiddle with this thing no matter how you come out.

Justice Antonin Scalia

We don't believe that was the intent of Congress...

Beth Brinkmann (Note: Counsel for Governor Felix P. Camacho)

Well, whether that was their intent or not!

— Justice Antonin Scalia

While the case was originally brought by Moylan to promote fiscal conservatism, ironically, when it reached the Supreme Court of the United States, the minority remarked in its dissent that actually the Government of Guam could, sua sponte, sidestep the debt ceiling by doubling the assessed value of property while halving the tax rate of that same property in one Public Law, entirely contrary to Moylan's stated goals of enforcing federal sovereignty in the unincorporated territory. While the Court found this outcome unlikely, it was put into practice twice by Guam's government in the aftermath of the case.

On 29 September 2007, Guam increased the tax assessment on real property from 35% to 70%, while halving its land tax rate to 1/8% and 1/2% respectively. On 11 May 2009, Camacho signed a nearly identical provision into law, increasing the assessment to 90% while reducing the taxes to 7/72% and 7/18% respectively.
