= Zuni Public School District No. 89 v. Department of Education =

- Supreme Court of the United States

Decided April 17, 2007
- Full case name: Zuni Public School District No. 89 v. Department of Education
- Citations: 550 U.S. 81 (more)

Holding
- The statute authorizing the Federal Impact Aid Program permits the Secretary of Education to identify the school districts that should be "disregard[ed]" by looking to the number of the district's pupils as well as to the size of the district's expenditures per pupil.

Court membership
- Chief Justice John Roberts Associate Justices John P. Stevens · Antonin Scalia; Anthony Kennedy · David Souter; Clarence Thomas · Ruth Bader Ginsburg; Stephen Breyer · Samuel Alito

Zuni Public School District No. 89 v. Department of Education, 550 U.S. 81 (2007), was a United States Supreme Court case in which the court held that the statute authorizing the Federal Impact Aid Program permits the Secretary of Education to identify the school districts that should be "disregard[ed]" by looking to the number of the district's pupils as well as to the size of the district's expenditures per pupil.
