= Rockwell International Corp. v. United States =

- Supreme Court of the United States

Argued December 5, 2006 Decided March 27, 2007
- Full case name: Rockwell International Corp., et al. v. United States, et al.
- Citations: 549 U.S. 457 (more) 127 S. Ct. 1397; 167 L. Ed. 2d 190; 2007 U.S. LEXIS 3778

Holding
- The original source requirement of the False Claims Act (FCA) provision setting for the original-source exception to the public-disclosure bar on federal-court jurisdiction is jurisdictional; the statutory phrase "information on which the allegations are based" refers to the relator's allegations and not the publicly disclosed allegations; the terms "allegations" is not limited to the allegations in the original complaint, but includes, at a minimum, the allegations in the original complaint as amended; relator's knowledge with respect to the pondcrete fell short of the direct and independent knowledge of the information on which the allegations are based required for him to qualify as an original source; and the government's intervention did not provide an independent basis of jurisdiction with respect to the relator.

Court membership
- Chief Justice John Roberts Associate Justices John P. Stevens · Antonin Scalia; Anthony Kennedy · David Souter; Clarence Thomas · Ruth Bader Ginsburg; Stephen Breyer · Samuel Alito

Case opinions
- Majority: Scalia, joined by Roberts, Kennedy, Souter, Thomas, Alito
- Dissent: Stevens, joined by Ginsburg
- Breyer took no part in the consideration or decision of the case.

Laws applied
- False Claims Act

Rockwell International Corp. v. United States, 549 U.S. 457 (2007), is a United States Supreme Court case in which the Court examined the "original source" exception to the "public-disclosure" bar of the False Claims Act. The Court held that (1) the original source requirement of the FCA provision setting for the original-source exception to the public-disclosure bar on federal-court jurisdiction is jurisdictional; (2) the statutory phrase "information on which the allegations are based" refers to the relator's allegations and not the publicly disclosed allegations; the terms "allegations" is not limited to the allegations in the original complaint, but includes, at a minimum, the allegations in the original complaint as amended; (3) relator's knowledge with respect to the pondcrete fell short of the direct and independent knowledge of the information on which the allegations are based required for him to qualify as an original source; and (4) the government's intervention did not provide an independent basis of jurisdiction with respect to the relator.

== Background ==
Qui tam relator James Stone brought an action against government contractor, Rockwell International Corporation, alleging that it violated the False Claims Act while operating a nuclear weapons plant. In the course of defending against the relator's action, Rockwell filed a motion to dismiss for lack of subject-matter jurisdiction based on the relator's alleged failure to qualify as an original source under the FCA. Rockwell's motion was denied by the district court.

The U.S. Government intervened, pursuant to the intervention provisions of the FCA, and together with the relator, filed a joint amended complaint alleging, among other things, that Rockwell committed environmental violations by storing leaky blocks of pondcrete—a form of processed toxic waste. Following a jury trial, the United States District Court for the District of Colorado entered judgment in favor of the United States and relator Stone. As a result, the district court awarded statutorily-provided treble damages to the plaintiffs.

Rockwell appealed the judgment, and the Tenth Circuit affirmed in relevant part, but remanded for a determination of whether the relator had satisfied a statutory requirement of disclosing information underlying his claims to the government prior to bringing suit. On remand, the district court found that the relator had not made an adequate disclosure, and appeal was taken. The Tenth Circuit Court of Appeals held that the relator was an original source.

== Opinion of the Court ==
The United States Supreme Court granted certiorari on the limited original source issue.

Justice Breyer took no part in consideration or decision of this case.
