= United States v. Resendiz-Ponce =

- Supreme Court of the United States

Decided January 9, 2007
- Full case name: United States v. Resendiz-Ponce
- Citations: 549 U.S. 102 (more)

Holding
- An indictment alleging attempted reentry under 8 U.S.C §1326(a) need not specifically allege a particular overt act or any other component part of the offense.

Court membership
- Chief Justice John Roberts Associate Justices John P. Stevens · Antonin Scalia; Anthony Kennedy · David Souter; Clarence Thomas · Ruth Bader Ginsburg; Stephen Breyer · Samuel Alito

Case opinions
- Majority: Stevens, joined by Roberts, Kennedy, Souter, Thomas, Ginsburg, Breyer, Alito
- Dissent: Scalia

United States v. Resendiz-Ponce, 549 U.S. 102 (2007), was a United States Supreme Court case in which the court held that an indictment alleging attempted reentry under 8 U.S.C §1326(a) need not specifically allege a particular overt act or any other component part of the offense.

== Background ==
Juan Resendiz-Ponce, a Mexican citizen, was charged with violating 8 U.S.C. §1326(a) by attempting to reenter the United States after having been deported. The federal District Court denied his motion to have the indictment dismissed because it did not allege a specific overt act that he committed in seeking reentry. In reversing, the Ninth Circuit Court of Appeals reasoned that the indictment's omission of an overt act was a fatal flaw not subject to harmless-error review.

The Supreme Court granted certiorari.

== Opinion of the court ==
The Supreme Court issued an opinion on January 9, 2007.
