= Jones v. Bock =

- Supreme Court of the United States

Argued October 30, 2006 Decided January 22, 2007
- Full case name: Lorenzo L. Jones, Petitioner v. Barbara Bock, Warden, et al.; Timothy Williams, Petitioner v. William S. Overton, et al.; John H. Walton, Petitioner, v. Barbara Bouchard, et al.
- Citations: 549 U.S. 199 (more) 127 S. Ct. 910; 166 L. Ed. 2d 798; 2007 U.S. LEXIS 1325; 75 U.S.L.W. 4058; 68 Fed. R. Serv. 3d (Callaghan) 643; 20 Fla. L. Weekly Fed. S 61

Court membership
- Chief Justice John Roberts Associate Justices John P. Stevens · Antonin Scalia; Anthony Kennedy · David Souter; Clarence Thomas · Ruth Bader Ginsburg; Stephen Breyer · Samuel Alito

Case opinion
- Majority: Roberts, joined by unanimous

Jones v. Bock, 549 U.S. 199 (2007), was a case before the United States Supreme Court. The issues concerned obligations of inmate litigants before one could file a civil rights action. The majority opinion was by Chief Justice Roberts and the court decided the case unanimously.

== Background ==
Congress passed the Prison Litigation Reform Act (PLRA) in 1996 to help reduce the strain on the federal judicial system of extensive inmate litigation. The act mandated exhaustion of federal and state administrative remedies before an inmate could file a civil rights action.

The Sixth Circuit along with some other lower courts adopted several procedural rules designed to implement this exhaustion requirement and facilitate early judicial screening.

The Supreme Court granted certiorari to resolve the conflict in Jones v. Bock, and two other consolidated cases, namely Walton v. Bouchard, and Williams v. Overton, which it unanimously decided that failure to exhaust prison grievance procedures is an affirmative defense, thereby rejecting the Court of Appeals' procedural rules as exceeding the proper limits of the judicial role.

The issues in these cases were:

1. whether the PLRA prescribes "total exhaustion" that requires a federal court to dismiss a prisoner's federal civil rights complaint for failure to exhaust his administrative remedies whenever there is a single unexhausted claim, despite the presence of other exhausted claims;
2. whether the PLRA requires a prisoner to name a particular defendant in his or her administrative grievance in order to exhaust his or her administrative remedies as to that defendant and to preserve his or her right to sue them; and
3. whether satisfaction of the PLRA's exhaustion requirement is a prerequisite to a prisoner's federal civil rights suit such that the prisoner must allege and document in his complaint how he exhausted his administrative remedies, or instead, whether non-exhaustion is an affirmative defense that must be pleaded and proved by the defense.

== Decision ==
The Supreme Court decided the three issues on January 22, 2007, in favor of inmate litigants. It rejected various exhaustion screening mechanisms adopted by some of the circuits and thus made it less difficult for inmates/plaintiffs to pursue lawsuits involving complaints about their treatment in prison.

== See also ==
- Prison Litigation Reform Act
