= Sinochem International Co. v. Malaysia International Shipping Corp. =

Sinochem International Co., Ltd. v. Malaysia International Shipping Corporation
- Supreme Court of the United States

Argued January 9, 2007 Decided March 5, 2007
- Full case name: Sinochem International Co., Ltd. v. Malaysia International Shipping Corporation
- Citations: 549 U.S. 422 (more) 127 S. Ct. 1184; 167 L. Ed. 2d 15

Holding
- A United States district court has discretion to respond at once to a defendant's forum non conveniens plea, and need not take up first any other threshold objection.

Court membership
- Chief Justice John Roberts Associate Justices John P. Stevens · Antonin Scalia; Anthony Kennedy · David Souter; Clarence Thomas · Ruth Bader Ginsburg; Stephen Breyer · Samuel Alito

Case opinion
- Majority: Ginsburg, joined by unanimous

Sinochem International Co., Ltd. v. Malaysia International Shipping Corporation, 549 U.S. 422 (2007), was a case decided by the United States Supreme Court, in which the court held a United States district court has discretion to respond at once to a defendant's forum non conveniens plea, and need not take up first any other threshold objection. In particular, a court need not resolve whether it has authority to adjudicate the cause (subject-matter jurisdiction) or personal jurisdiction over the defendant if it determines that, in any event, a foreign tribunal is the more suitable arbiter of the merits of the case.
