= Marrama v. Citizens Bank of Massachusetts =

- Supreme Court of the United States

Argued November 6, 2006 Decided February 21, 2007
- Full case name: Robert Louis Marrama, Petitioner v. Citizens Bank of Massachusetts, et al.
- Docket no.: 05-996
- Citations: 549 U.S. 365 (more) 127 S. Ct. 1105; 166 L. Ed. 2d 956; 2007 U.S. LEXIS 2651; 75 U.S.L.W. 4113; Bankr. L. Rep. (CCH) ¶ 80,850; 57 Collier Bankr. Cas. 2d (MB) 1; 47 Bankr. Ct. Dec. 221; 20 Fla. L. Weekly Fed. S 93

Case history
- Prior: In re Marrama, 313 B.R. 525 (B.A.P. 1st Cir. 2004); affirmed, 430 F.3d 474 (1st Cir. 2005); cert. granted, 547 U.S. 1191 (2006).

Holding
- First Circuit Court of Appeals Affirmed

Court membership
- Chief Justice John Roberts Associate Justices John P. Stevens · Antonin Scalia; Anthony Kennedy · David Souter; Clarence Thomas · Ruth Bader Ginsburg; Stephen Breyer · Samuel Alito

Case opinions
- Majority: Stevens, joined by Kennedy, Souter, Ginsburg, Breyer
- Dissent: Alito, joined by Roberts, Scalia, Thomas

Laws applied
- Bankruptcy Code

Marrama v. Citizens Bank of Massachusetts, 549 U.S. 365 (2007), is a United States Supreme Court case about bad faith in bankruptcy.

== Facts ==
On March 11, 2003, Robert Marrama filed a voluntary bankruptcy petition under Chapter 7, thereby creating an estate consisting of all his property “wherever located and by whomever held.” Respondent Citizens Bank of Massachusetts was the principal creditor.

In his petition, Marrama made a number of statements about his house in Maine that were misleading or inaccurate. While he disclosed that he was the sole beneficiary of the trust that owned the property, he listed its value as zero. He also denied that he had transferred any property other than in the ordinary course of business during the year preceding the filing of his petition. Neither statement was true. In fact, the Maine property had substantial value, and Marrama had transferred it into the newly created trust for no consideration seven months prior to filing his Chapter 13 petition. Marrama later admitted that the purpose of the transfer was to protect the property from his creditors.

== Procedural history ==
At the hearing, Marrama explained that his misstatements about the Maine property were attributable to a “scrivener’s error” and claimed an absolute right to convert his claim from Chapter 7 to Chapter 13. The Bankruptcy Judge rejected these arguments. Marrama appealed to the Bankruptcy Appellate Panel for the First Circuit, which affirmed the lower court's ruling. On appeal from the panel, the full First Circuit Court of Appeals affirmed, rejecting the argument that §706(a) gives a Chapter 7 debtor an absolute right to convert to Chapter 13. Marrama appealed again to the Supreme Court. Because other circuit courts had issued contrary opinions, the Supreme Court granted certiorari to resolve the difference.

== Decision ==
=== Issue ===
Does a debtor who acts in bad faith before, or in the course of, filing a Chapter 13 petition by, for example, fraudulently concealing significant assets, thereby forfeit his right to obtain Chapter 13 relief?

=== Parties' arguments ===
Marrama's argument was that he had an absolute right to convert his case from Chapter 7 to Chapter 13 under the plain language of §706(a) of the Code.

Citizens Bank argued that the statute uses the word “may” rather than “shall,” leaving room for the courts, in their discretion, to construe a "bad faith" exception to the general rule.

=== Opinion of the Court ===
Justice Stevens wrote the opinion for the Court. Agreeing with the First Circuit's opinion, the Court held that there is a bad faith exception to the right to convert from Chapter 7 to Chapter 11. According to the Court, "a Chapter 13 proceeding may be either dismissed or converted to a Chapter 7 proceeding 'for cause' and includes a nonexclusive list of 10 causes justifying that relief. None of the specified causes mentions prepetition bad-faith conduct.... Bankruptcy courts nevertheless routinely treat dismissal for prepetition bad-faith conduct as implicitly authorized by the words 'for cause.'"

=== Dissent ===
Justice Alito dissented from the opinion of the Court, and was joined by three other Justices. Alito found that the imposition of the bad-faith exception "is inconsistent with the Bankruptcy Code." His opinion follows the plain language of the statute, specifically the passage that indicates that a "debtor may convert a case under this chapter to a case under chapter 11, 12, or 13 of this title at any time, if the case has not been converted under section 1112, 1208, or 1307 of this title." He finds that to read an implied bad-faith exception would violate the actual wording of the statute, and that the statute functions well without need of such an interpretation.
