= EC Term of Years Trust v. United States =

- Supreme Court of the United States

Decided April 30, 2007
- Full case name: EC Term of Years Trust v. United States
- Citations: 550 U.S. 429 (more)

Case history
- Prior: 434 F.3d 80 (5th Cir. 2006)

Holding
- A trust that has missed 26 U.S.C. §7426(a)(1)’s deadline for challenging a levy may not bring the challenge as a tax refund claim under 28 U.S.C. §1346(a)(1).

Court membership
- Chief Justice John Roberts Associate Justices John P. Stevens · Antonin Scalia; Anthony Kennedy · David Souter; Clarence Thomas · Ruth Bader Ginsburg; Stephen Breyer · Samuel Alito

Case opinion
- Majority: Souter, joined by unanimous

EC Term of Years Trust v. United States, 550 U.S. 429 (2007), was a United States Supreme Court case in which the court held that a trust that has missed 26 U.S.C. §7426(a)(1)’s deadline for challenging a levy may not bring the challenge as a tax refund claim under 28 U.S.C. §1346(a)(1).

== Background ==
Under 26 U. S. C. §7426(a)(1), if the Internal Revenue Service (IRS) levies upon a third party’s property to collect taxes owed by another, the third party may bring a wrongful levy action against the United States, so long as such action is brought before "the expiration of 9 months from the date of the levy," §6532(c)(1). In contrast, the limitations period for a tax refund action under 28 U. S. C. §1346(a)(1) begins with an administrative claim that may be filed within at least two years, and may be brought to court within another two years after an administrative denial. The IRS levied on a bank account in which petitioner (Trust) had deposited funds because the IRS assumed that the Trust's creators had transferred assets to the Trust to evade taxes. The bank responded with a check to the Treasury. Almost a year later, the Trust and others brought a §7426(a)(1) action claiming wrongful levies, but the federal District Court dismissed the complaint because it was filed after the 9-month limitations period had expired. After unsuccessfully pursuing a tax refund at the administrative level, the Trust filed a refund action under §1346(a)(1). The District Court held that a wrongful levy claim under §7426(a)(1) was the sole remedy possible and dismissed, and the Fifth Circuit Court of Appeals affirmed.

The Supreme Court granted certiorari.

== Opinion of the court ==
The Supreme Court issued an opinion on April 30, 2007.
