= Schriro v. Landrigan =

- Supreme Court of the United States

Argued January 9, 2007 Decided May 14, 2007
- Full case name: Dora B. Schriro, Director, Arizona Department of Corrections, Petitioner v. Jeffrey Timothy Landrigan, aka Billy Patrick Wayne Hill
- Docket no.: 05-1575
- Citations: 550 U.S. 465 (more) 127 S. Ct. 1933, 167 L.Ed.2d 836
- Argument: Oral argument
- Opinion announcement: Opinion announcement

Case history
- Prior: Convictions and sentences upheld, State v. Landrigan, 859 P.2d 111 (Ariz. 1993); cert. denied, Landrigan v. Arizona, 510 U.S. 927; habeas corpus denied, Landrigan v. Stewart, No. Civ. 96-002367-PHX-ROS (D. Ariz. 1999); affirmed, 272 F.3d 1221 (9th Cir. 2001); rehearing en banc granted, 397 F.3d 1235 (9th Cir. 2005); reversed on rehearing en banc, Landrigan v. Schriro, 441 F.3d 638 (9th Cir. 2006); cert. granted, 548 U.S. 941.
- Subsequent: Affirmed, 501 F.3d 1147 (9th Cir. 2007); authorization to file second or successive habeas corpus petition denied, Landrigan v. Trujillo, 623 F.3d 1253 (9th Cir. 2010).

Holding
- The District Court did not abuse its discretion in refusing to grant Landrigan an evidentiary hearing.

Court membership
- Chief Justice John Roberts Associate Justices John P. Stevens · Antonin Scalia; Anthony Kennedy · David Souter; Clarence Thomas · Ruth Bader Ginsburg; Stephen Breyer · Samuel Alito

Case opinions
- Majority: Thomas, joined by Roberts, Scalia, Kennedy, Alito
- Dissent: Stevens, joined by Souter, Ginsburg, Breyer

Laws applied
- Antiterrorism and Effective Death Penalty Act of 1996

Schriro v. Landrigan, 550 U.S. 465 (2007), was a United States Supreme Court case decided on May 14, 2007. In a 5–4 decision written by Justice Clarence Thomas, the Court held that the District Court had not abused its discretion when it refused to grant an evidentiary hearing to convicted murderer Jeffrey Timothy Landrigan who had instructed his defense counsel not to put on any mitigation case during the sentencing phase of a capital murder trial. In doing so, the Supreme Court also reversed the prior ruling to the contrary by the en banc United States Court of Appeals for the Ninth Circuit, which had held that Landrigan was entitled to habeas relief on the grounds that he had received ineffective assistance of counsel. The latter court had also held that the District Court's denial of such a hearing to Landrigan amounted to an "unreasonable determination of the facts", which is one of the two circumstances under which the Antiterrorism and Effective Death Penalty Act of 1996 permits the granting of federal habeas relief to state prisoners.

== Background ==
Jeffrey Timothy Landrigan was convicted of second-degree murder in Oklahoma in 1982. In 1986, while in prison for that murder, Landrigan repeatedly stabbed another inmate, for which he was convicted of assault and battery with a deadly weapon. In 1989, he escaped from prison and murdered Chester Dean Dyer during a burglary. For this crime, Landrigan was convicted of theft, second-degree burglary, and felony murder. At his sentencing hearing for this conviction, Landrigan's lawyer attempted to present mitigating evidence, but Landrigan repeatedly interrupted him, and at Landrigan's request, multiple witnesses who had intended to testify on his behalf did not do so. The judge overseeing Landrigan's sentencing hearing subsequently sentenced him to death, and the Arizona Supreme Court unanimously affirmed his sentence and conviction.

Landrigan said in an affidavit that he would have allowed the mitigating evidence if his attorney had informed him of other evidentiary options. The Arizona state courts rejected Landrigran's post-conviction petition, finding that he waived his right to present mitigation evidence.

After Landrigan's subsequent attempts to seek postconviction relief in state court failed, he filed a habeas corpus petition in federal court. The District Court refused to grant Landrigan an evidentiary hearing. On appeal, a three-judge panel of the Ninth Circuit affirmed this decision, but the full Ninth Circuit subsequently reheard the case en banc and reversed, holding that Landrigan was entitled to a hearing because, contrary to the District Court's conclusion, he had made a "colorable" claim that he had received ineffective assistance of counsel that fell below the standard outlined by the Supreme Court in Strickland v. Washington. The en banc Ninth Circuit stated that Landrigan's counsel had failed to adequately prepare for Landrigan's sentencing hearing, and that the Arizona postconviction court's conclusion that Landrigan had instructed his counsel not to present mitigating evidence was an "unreasonable determination of the facts" and thus grounds for habeas relief under AEDPA.

== Supreme Court ==
=== Opinion of the Court ===
The Supreme Court granted certiorari in the case on September 26, 2006. Oral arguments took place on January 9, 2007, and the Supreme Court issued its decision on May 14, 2007. Justice Clarence Thomas delivered the majority opinion, in which Chief Justice John Roberts, Antonin Scalia, Anthony Kennedy, and Samuel Alito joined. The Court reversed the en banc Ninth Circuit, holding that the District Court was entirely justified in refusing to grant him an evidentiary hearing, as well as in concluding that, even if he were permitted to further develop the factual record at such a hearing, he would still not be entitled to habeas relief:

Regardless of what [additional] information counsel might have uncovered in his investigation, Landrigan would have interrupted and refused to allow his counsel to present any such evidence. Accordingly, the District Court could conclude that because of his established recalcitrance, Landrigan could not demonstrate prejudice under Strickland v. Washington (1984), establishing standards for reviewing claims of constitutionally deficient performance by defense counsel] even if granted an evidentiary hearing.

Unless barred by §2254(e)(2), district courts may allow an evidentiary hearing under AEDPA § 2254 Rule 8(a) if proving the petitioner's factual allegations would allow habeas relief under AEDPA's standards:

The question under AEDPA is not whether a federal court believes the state court's determination was incorrect but whether that determination was unreasonable—a substantially higher threshold. See Williams v. Taylor, 529 U.S. 362, 410 (2000).

The majority opinion stated that it was not "not objectively unreasonable" or an abuse of discretion under § 2254(d) for the Arizona court to conclude that "a defendant who refused to allow the presentation of any mitigating evidence could not establish Strickland prejudice based on his counsel's failure to investigate further possible mitigating evidence." Noting AEDPA § 2254(e)(1) requires federal courts to presume that state court factual findings are correct, the Court concludes: "if the record refutes the applicant’s factual allegations or otherwise precludes habeas relief, a district court is not required to hold an evidentiary hearing."

Landrigan wanted to present evidence of being genetically predisposed to violence but the Court did not think the genetic claim would have outweighed the prison break, multiple murders and statements made to the sentencing judge. The Court noted that genetic evidence was a double-edged sword: "although Landrigan's new evidence can be called mitigating in some slight sense, it would also have shown the court that it could anticipate that he would continue to be violent."

The Court refused to consider a new claim raised for the first time by the Court of Appeals that Landrigan's statement to the trial judge was not an "informed and knowing" waiver of his constitutional right to present mitigating evidence during the penalty phase. The Court said the new claim would be barred by §2254(e)(2) because it was never presented to the state court. They also said Landrigan was present when defense counsel told the sentencing court that he had informed the defendant of the importance of mitigating evidence in capital proceedings. Finally, the Court said that Landrigan's statement to the trial court that he was "ready for it", referring to the death penalty, showed that he understood the consequences of telling the judge that he did not want to present a mitigation case.

=== Dissent ===
The dissenting opinion was written by Justice John Paul Stevens and joined by David Souter, Ruth Bader Ginsburg, and Stephen Breyer. Stevens argued that Landrigan's counsel failed to adequately investigate and present mitigating evidence regarding Landrigan's upbringing and psychological condition. He also argued that the majority engaged in "pure guesswork" by reasoning that, were they to grant Landrigan an evidentiary hearing, it would not have made a difference in his sentencing. Stevens' dissent concluded that the en banc Ninth Circuit's "narrow holding that the District Court abused its discretion in denying respondent an evidentiary hearing should be affirmed." He said the majority decision "can only be explained by its increasingly familiar effort to guard the floodgates of litigation."

== Subsequent developments ==
In Adams v. Quarterman the Fifth Circuit said Landrigan only applied when the defendant instructed counsel not to present any mitigating evidence. Even if the defendant is uncooperative and instructs counsel not to contact family members, defense counsel should investigate other mitigating circumstances.
