= Supracompetitive pricing =

Concept in business and economics

Supracompetitive pricing (or excessive pricing) is pricing above a level that would be sustained in a competitive market. This may be indicative of a business that has a unique legal or competitive advantage or of anti-competitive behavior that has driven competition from the market.

An example of a unique legal advantage would be a drug company that is the first to discover and successfully manufacture a medication to treat a certain disease. Initially, as the only market player the drug company may be able to charge supra competitive prices until other companies catch up. In this case, the regulatory hurdle for other drug companies to enter the market may be regulatory drug approval, which may prove a substantial barrier to entry.

However, other companies may not be able to enter the market due to another barrier to entry, intellectual property (IP) rights. The drug company may have a patent on the new formulation which excludes any other company from entering the market with a drug that is based on the same patented formulation. This precludes competitors from entering the market until the patent expires or unless they acquire a licence for the patented drug patent owner. An example of a competitive advantage may be a large company with a trusted brand name and a substantial marketing budget that simply overwhelms a local competitor by driving demand for its product over the competitor's product, at least in the short term. A firm may engage in supracompetitive pricing when securing a position of dominance in the relevant market. For example, following a period of predatory pricing, which is considered an antitrust abuse.

In marketing, multiple competitive strategies, including price manipulation, can be used in order to gain competitive advantage. Successful marketing and business strategies are not only concentrated on creating the value for the customer, but also on the competition. Considering that, companies can decide between two main approaches, i.e. competitive strategies : • First approach is directed towards development and implementation of competition oriented strategies whose main goal is to create “better state of peace” between the market competitors. • Second approach is directed towards development of strategies whose main goal is to weaken, eliminate or destroy the competitor company. Those strategies are not focused on consumer welfare, but are oriented towards maximization of profits. This type of strategy is known as predatory strategy or predatory pricing.

== Concept ==
The concept of supracompetitive pricing is connected to the concept of predatory pricing. Predatory pricing can be defined as a dynamic market strategy that is characteristic in a single market where a company decides to develop a business strategy that includes the sacrifice in a short run in order to eliminate existing competition and acquisition of a dominant market position where the losses can be recovered by setting supracompetitive prices . Predatory pricing refers to the process of elimination of competition by setting predatory prices, prices that are so low that they drive the competition out of the market thus enabling the establishment of monopoly where a company can recoup their loss and generate more profit by setting supracompetitive prices.

== Characteristics ==
There are two main stages that are present in the strategy of predatory, i.e. supracompetitive pricing that include predation stage and post-predation stage (Weismann, 2006). Predation phase is focused on lowering of the prices, usually below some measure of economic cost. This is known as an incremental cost and the main purpose is to make the competitor companies to leave the market. The second phase is post-predation phase where the company raises the prices of their products and services to supracompetitive level . Taking that into account, it is possible to derive two main characteristics of supracompetitive prices (Baumol, 2003): • Supracompetitive prices are used to gain monopolistic market position and regain losses that occurred in the predatory phase, • Supracompetitive prices have no legitimate business justification besides regaining losses realized during the predatory phase.

== Consequences ==
It is considered that traditional predatory strategy that includes setting supracompetitive prices in a regular market can't be sustained and it is considered to be irrational . There is an ongoing debate regarding supracompetitive pricing, i.e. if there is the necessity for state authorities to pursue companies that are setting supracompetitive prices. There is an ongoing debate, as well as growing number of articles that are well informed about the issues of excessive pricing and its impact on the economy and many of those have proposed that different countries need to establish a set of measures that are most appropriate in their country regarding supracompetitive pricing (Nair, Mondliwa, 2015). This type of intervention should especially be considered in small economies where self-correction ability of the market is limited. In big markets there some arguments against intervention regarding supracompetitive prices. Those include the following : • Supracompetitive prices are self-regulating. The first argument against state intervention and regulation of supracompetitive pricing is that supracompetitive prices are self-correcting. That statement is based on two main arguments. Firstly, supracompetitive prices attract new entrants to the market that can easily gain market share by offering products and services at a lower price compared to the competitor that has set supracompetitive price. Secondly, with the possibility of new entrants, dominant companies are forced to lower the prices of their products and services in order to keep their dominant market position. In cases where there are no significant barriers to enter the market present, dominant companies will refrain from setting supracompetitive prices, at least in the long run. • Price control lessens incentives for investment. Temporary high prices are present and important in the dynamic markets. Firms invest and gain profits for risky investments when supracompetitive prices are present. Price regulation and state intervention can thus discourage potential investments since the rewards are lower in less risky environment. • Supracompetitive prices are difficult to assess. Dominant companies charge for their products and services the prices that are higher than the marginal cost. The question that it is necessary to answer is when the price is too high. There are two main criteria that need to be taken into consideration while deciding if the prices are supracompetitive. First is determining if the price poses a threat to survival of an efficient competitor. Second is determining is the price has a legitimate business justification (Baumol, 2003). • There is no appropriate regulation to remedy supracompetitive prices. Authorities can find that some companies set supracompetitive prices that undermine the customer welfare and present a threat of survival to competing companies. In those cases authorities can fine the company setting supracompetitive prices in order to stop excessive charging. But these types of activities can be implemented periodically and in the end don't represent the long-term solution for the problem of supracompetitive pricing.

== Reactions ==
Even though there are multiple reasons against regulation of supracompetitive prices and the traditional predation model is considered to be irrational and inefficient, there are a few conditions that need to be satisfied for this marketing strategy to be considered rational and acceptable. Those primarily include the presence of predatory company in multiple markets with multiple products and services, information distribution where possible new entrants and existing competition don't recognize the signs of predatory strategy and presence of market conditions and entry barriers that enable supracompetitive pricing. Claims of predation and supracompetitive pricing are not uncommon in dynamic market, but in many cases those are just attempts of the competitors to raise their rivals’ cost . The antitrust laws are concerned with the task of distinguishing competitive strategies that contribute to welfare enhancement of consumers from ones that reduce the welfare of consumers. That task is becoming more complex and difficult with the possible presence of predatory marketing strategy, i.e. supracompetitive pricing (Gundlach, 1995). Price predation represents only one possible strategy of companies that seek to strengthen their market position, but it is not necessarily the only marketing strategy the company applies in order to gain market power. The predatory strategy can be used in combination with other strategies such as non-predatory strategy that is focused on raising the costs of rivals’ products and services.
