= BP America Production Co. v. Burton =

- Supreme Court of the United States

Argued October 4, 2006 Decided December 11, 2006
- Full case name: BP America Production Co., successor in interest to Amoco Production Co., et al. v. Rejane Burton, Acting Assistant Secretary, Land and Minerals Management, Department of the Interior, et al.
- Docket no.: 05-669
- Citations: 549 U.S. 84 (more) 127 S. Ct. 638; 166 L. Ed. 2d 494

Case history
- Prior: Amoco Production Co. v. Baca, 300 F. Supp. 2d 1 (D.D.C. 2003); affirmed sub. nom., Amoco Production Co. v. Watson, 410 F.3d 722 (D.C. Cir. 2005); cert. granted, 547 U.S. 1068 (2006).

Holding
- A statute of limitations on government actions for contract claims does not apply to actions by a federal administrative agency to recover royalties on federal oil and gas leases.

Court membership
- Chief Justice John Roberts Associate Justices John P. Stevens · Antonin Scalia; Anthony Kennedy · David Souter; Clarence Thomas · Ruth Bader Ginsburg; Stephen Breyer · Samuel Alito

Case opinion
- Majority: Alito, joined by Stevens, Scalia, Kennedy, Souter, Thomas, Ginsburg
- Roberts and Breyer took no part in the consideration or decision of the case.

Laws applied
- Mineral Leasing Act of 1920, Federal Oil and Gas Royalty Management Act, Federal Oil and Gas Royalty Simplification and Fairness Act of 1996

BP America Production Co. v. Burton, 549 U.S. 84 (2006), was a United States Supreme Court case about whether a statute of limitations on government actions for contract claims applies to actions by a federal administrative agency to recover royalties on federal oil and gas leases. After two members recused themselves, the court ruled unanimously that it does not apply, in an opinion by Justice Samuel Alito.

== Legal background ==
The Mineral Leasing Act of 1920 (MLA) authorizes the Department of the Interior to lease public lands to private parties for the production of oil and gas. In 1982, Congress enacted the Federal Oil and Gas Royalty Management Act (FOGRMA) to address inadequacies with the system of accounting for royalties due on oil and gas produced from lease sites. FOGRMA ordered the Secretary of the Interior to audit those leases and collect what was owed the government. The Secretary, in turn, has assigned these duties to the Department of the Interior's Minerals Management Service (MMS).

If MMS concludes that the lessee owes royalties greater than what it has paid, MMS issues an order requiring payment of the amount due. There is no dispute that a lawsuit in court to recover royalties owed is covered by a general six-year statute of limitations for Government contract actions.

== Facts ==
The petitioner, BP America Production Co., holds gas leases for lands in New Mexico’s and Colorado's San Juan Basin. BP’s predecessor, Amoco Production Co., first entered into these leases nearly fifty years ago, and these leases require the payment of a royalty. For years, Amoco calculated the royalty as a percentage of the value of the gas as of the moment it was produced at the well. In 1996, MMS sent lessees a letter directing that royalties should be calculated based not on the value of the gas at the well, but on the value of the gas after it was treated to meet the quality requirements for introduction into the Nation’s mainline pipelines. Therefore, MMS in 1997 ordered payment of $32,264,570 in additional royalties (and interest) for the period from January 1989 through December 1996 to cover the difference.

== Procedural history ==
Amoco appealed the order, disputing the new interpretation of its royalty obligations and arguing that the payment order was in any event barred in part by the six-year statute of limitations. The Assistant Secretary of the Interior denied the appeal and ruled that the statute of limitations was inapplicable.

Amoco sought review by the United States District Court for the District of Columbia, which agreed with the Assistant Secretary that the statute of limitations did not apply. The D.C. Circuit Court of Appeals affirmed the district court's ruling. The Supreme Court granted certiorari to resolve a circuit split between the D.C. Circuit and the Tenth Circuit.

== Decision ==
=== Issue ===
Does the six-year statute of limitations for government actions for monetary damages in 28 U.S.C. § 2415(a) govern the issuance of administrative payment orders, as opposed to the government's filing of a complaint in court?

=== Parties' arguments ===
BP contended that their broader interpretation of the statutory term "action" was supported by the reference to "every action for money damages" founded upon "any contract." They also argued that an MMS letter or payment order constituted a "complaint".

The respondent relied on the language of the statute to argue that "action" meant an action in court, not an administrative proceeding.

=== Opinion of the Court ===
The court unanimously held that the statute of limitations did not apply to administrative actions. "Nothing in the language of § 2415(a) suggests that Congress intended these terms to apply more broadly to administrative proceedings. On the contrary, § 2415(a) distinguishes between judicial and administrative proceedings. Section 2415(a) provides that an 'action' must commence 'within one year after final decisions have been rendered in applicable administrative proceedings.' Thus, Congress knew how to identify administrative proceedings and manifestly had two separate concepts in mind when it enacted § 2415(a)."

Justice Alito further states that the situation is subject to the traditional rule quod nullum tempus occurrit regi—time does not run against the King. "A corollary of this rule is that when the sovereign elects to subject itself to a statute of limitations, the sovereign is given the benefit of the doubt if the scope of the statute is ambiguous."

== Recusals ==
Chief Justice Roberts and Justice Breyer did not participate in the decision. According to the Legal Times, "Roberts had ruled in the case in his former position as judge on the D.C. Circuit, and Breyer reported in his 2005 financial disclosure form that he owned between $15,001 and $50,000 in BP Amoco stock."
