= Credit Suisse Securities (USA) LLC v. Billing =

Credit Suisse v. Billing
- Supreme Court of the United States

Argued March 27, 2007 Decided June 18, 2007
- Full case name: Credit Suisse Securities (USA) LLC, fka Credit Suisse First Boston LLC, et al. v. Billing et al.
- Docket no.: 05–1157
- Citations: 551 U.S. 264 (more) 127 S. Ct. 2383; 168 L. Ed. 2d 145

Case history
- Prior: Certiorari to the United States Court of Appeals for the Second Circuit

Holding
- Congress's creation of the Securities and Exchange Commission implicitly exempted regulated securities industries from antitrust lawsuits.

Court membership
- Chief Justice John Roberts Associate Justices John P. Stevens · Antonin Scalia; Anthony Kennedy · David Souter; Clarence Thomas · Ruth Bader Ginsburg; Stephen Breyer · Samuel Alito

Case opinions
- Majority: Breyer, joined by Roberts, Scalia, Souter, Ginsburg, Alito
- Concurrence: Stevens (in judgment)
- Dissent: Thomas
- Kennedy took no part in the consideration or decision of the case.

Credit Suisse Securities (USA) LLC v. Billing, 551 U.S. 264 (2007), was a decision by the Supreme Court of the United States, which held that the securities markets were exempt from the scope of antitrust laws.

== Judgment ==
The Supreme Court held that creation of the United States Securities and Exchange Commission (SEC) implicitly exempted the regulated securities industry from antitrust lawsuits under other existing laws. Justice Thomas dissented, arguing that the laws creating the SEC explicitly mention that securities regulations are in addition to, not instead of, existing law.

== See also ==
- List of United States Supreme Court cases, volume 551
- List of United States Supreme Court cases
- Credit Suisse First Boston (Europe) Ltd v Lister
