= Whorton v. Bockting =

- Supreme Court of the United States

Argued November 1, 2006 Decided February 28, 2007
- Full case name: Glen Whorton, Director, Nevada Department of Corrections, Petitioner v. Marvin Howard Bockting
- Citations: 549 U.S. 406 (more) 127 S. Ct. 1173; 167 L. Ed. 2d 1; 2007 U.S. LEXIS 2826; 75 U.S.L.W. 4121; 72 Fed. R. Evid. Serv. (Callaghan) 635; 44 A.L.R. Fed. 2d 777; 20 Fla. L. Weekly Fed. S 99

Holding
- Crawford v. Washington does not apply retroactively. Ninth Circuit Court of Appeals reversed.

Court membership
- Chief Justice John Roberts Associate Justices John P. Stevens · Antonin Scalia; Anthony Kennedy · David Souter; Clarence Thomas · Ruth Bader Ginsburg; Stephen Breyer · Samuel Alito

Case opinion
- Majority: Alito, joined by unanimous

Laws applied
- U.S. Const. amend. VI

Whorton v. Bockting, 549 U.S. 406 (2007), was a United States Supreme Court case in which the court held that the interpretation of the Confrontation Clause that it announced in Crawford v. Washington (2006) does not apply retroactively.

== Background ==
The respondent, Marvin Howard Bockting, of Las Vegas, Nevada, was accused of sexual assault of his wife Laura's six-year-old daughter. A police detective interviewed the victim in the presence of her mother, and physical evidence was gathered at a hospital. The grand jury indicted Bockting on four counts of sexual assault on a minor under 14 years of age. The victim testified at the preliminary hearing, and Bockting was held over for trial.

At trial, the court held a hearing to determine whether the victim could testify. Finding that Autumn was too distressed to be sworn in, the State moved to allow Laura Bockting and the detective to recount the victim's statements to the jury. Under Nevada law, out-of-court statements made by a child under 10 years of age describing acts of sexual assault or physical abuse of the child may be admitted if the court finds that the child is unavailable or unable to testify and that "the time, content and circumstances of the statement provide sufficient circumstantial guarantees of trustworthiness." The court found sufficient evidence of reliability to admit the testimony.

After hearing the evidence, the jury found Bockting guilty of three counts of sexual assault on a minor under the age of 14, and the court imposed two consecutive life sentences and another concurrent life sentence.

=== Procedural history ===
Bockting appealed to the Nevada Supreme Court, alleging that by allowing the out-of-court statements to be read to the jury, the state had violated Bockting's confrontation clause rights under the Sixth Amendment. That Court held that the admission of the testimony was constitutional.

Bockting then filed a petition for a writ of habeas corpus with the United States District Court for the District of Nevada, making the same argument. The Court denied the petition, stating that Bockting was not entitled to relief under the habeas statute. Bockting appealed that decision to the United States Court of Appeals for the Ninth Circuit. While the appeal to the Ninth Circuit was pending, the Supreme Court issued its opinion in Crawford v. Washington, in which the Court held that testimony of witnesses absent from trial are admissible only where the declarant is unavailable, and only where the defendant has had a prior opportunity to cross-examine the witness. The Ninth Circuit held that Crawford applied retroactively, and reversed the lower court decision. The State appealed, and the Supreme Court granted certiorari.

== Decision ==
=== Issue ===
Did the holding in Crawford apply retroactively to judgments in criminal cases that are already final on direct review?

=== Opinion of the Court ===
Justice Samuel Alito gave the unanimous opinion of the Court. "Because Crawford announced a new rule and because it is clear and undisputed that the rule is procedural and not substantive, that rule cannot be applied in this collateral attack on respondent’s conviction unless it is a watershed rul[e] of criminal procedure implicating the fundamental fairness and accuracy of the criminal proceeding." There are two requirements for a holding to be a "watershed rule" First, the new rule must be "necessary to prevent an impermissibly large risk of an inaccurate conviction." Second, it must "alter our understanding of the bedrock procedural elements essential to the fairness of a proceeding."

The Court found that the holding in Crawford did not meet the first requirement, as it was too limited in scope. It also did not meet the second requirement, in that it only slightly changed the cross-examination jurisprudence, but did not fundamentally alter it. Therefore, the Court held, it was not a "watershed rule" and did not apply retroactively to Bockting's case.
