= MedImmune, Inc. v. Genentech, Inc. =

- Supreme Court of the United States

Argued October 4, 2006 Decided January 9, 2007
- Full case name: MedImmune, Inc. v. Genentech, Inc.
- Docket no.: 05-608
- Citations: 549 U.S. 118 (more) 127 S. Ct. 764; 166 L. Ed. 2d 604; 2007 U.S. LEXIS 1003; 75 U.S.L.W. 4034; 81 U.S.P.Q.2d 1225

Case history
- Prior: No. CV 03-2567, 2004 U.S. Dist. LEXIS 28680 (C.D. Cal. Apr. 26, 2004); affirmed, 427 F.3d 958 (Fed. Cir. 2005); cert. granted, 546 U.S. 1169 (2006).
- Subsequent: 535 F. Supp. 2d 1000 (C.D. Cal. 2008)

Holding
- Contrary to respondents' assertion that only a freestanding patent-invalidity claim is at issue, the record establishes that petitioner has raised and preserved the contract claim that, because of patent invalidity, unenforceability, and noninfringement, no royalties are owing.

Court membership
- Chief Justice John Roberts Associate Justices John P. Stevens · Antonin Scalia; Anthony Kennedy · David Souter; Clarence Thomas · Ruth Bader Ginsburg; Stephen Breyer · Samuel Alito

Case opinions
- Majority: Scalia, joined by Roberts, Stevens, Kennedy, Souter, Ginsburg, Breyer, Alito
- Dissent: Thomas

MedImmune, Inc. v. Genentech, Inc., 549 U.S. 118 (2007), was a decision by the Supreme Court of the United States involving patent law. It arose from a lawsuit filed by MedImmune which challenged one of the Cabilly patents issued to Genentech. One of the central issues was whether a licensee retained the right to challenge a licensed patent, or whether this right was forfeited upon signing of the license agreement. The case related indirectly to past debate over whether the US should change to a first to file patent system - in 2011, President Obama signed the Leahy-Smith America Invents Act, which shifted the United States to a first-inventor-to-file patent system.

== Background ==
The origin of the dispute was a lengthy interference proceeding between Genentech and Celltech which led to the issuance of a new patent in 2001, 18 years after the original filing. This effectively granted Genentech a patent term of 29 years. MedImmune was a licensee of the later Cabilly patent, but argued that the term had been improperly extended and that it need not continue to pay royalties past the original expiry date in March 2006. The case was decided in favor of MedImmune, and the United States Patent and Trademark Office (USPTO) declared the patent invalid. Genentech appealed the USPTO the ruling and the patent remained valid and enforceable until the appeal was concluded. Genentech prevailed during the reexamination of Cabilly II(2) by the USPTO (1). GlaxoSmithKline and Human Genome Sciences both are challenging the patent under antitrust law (1). This is based on the settlement between Genentech and Celltech and their dispute over the original Cabilly patent 4,816,567 and the Celltech's patent 4,816,397. Both of which issued on March 28, 1989 (2),(3). Cabilly II is patent 6331415(4) which issued December 18, 2001.

== Opinion of the Court ==
The Court held that:

1 licensee adequately raised and preserved its contract claim;

2 licensee was not required to terminate or breach license agreement prior to seeking declaratory judgment of patent invalidity, abrogating Gen–Probe Inc. v. Vysis, Inc.; and

3 Supreme Court would not address whether action was subject to dismissal on discretionary grounds.

Reversed and remanded.

Justice Thomas filed a dissenting opinion.

== See also ==
- List of United States Supreme Court cases, volume 549
- List of United States Supreme Court cases
- Altvater v. Freeman, 319 U.S. 359 (1943)
