= Environmental Defense v. Duke Energy Corp. =

Environmental Defense v. Duke Energy Corporation
- Supreme Court of the United States

Argued November 1, 2006 Decided April 2, 2007
- Full case name: Environmental Defense, et al., Petitioners v. Duke Energy Corporation, et al.
- Docket no.: 05-848
- Citations: 549 U.S. 561 (more) 127 S. Ct. 1423; 167 L. Ed. 2d 295; 2007 U.S. LEXIS 3784; 75 U.S.L.W. 4167; 63 ERC (BNA) 2088; 37 ELR 20076; 20 Fla. L. Weekly Fed. S 123

Case history
- Prior: On writ of certiorari to the United States Court of Appeals for the District of Columbia Circuit

Holding
- The interpretation of a "modification" in the Clean Air Act, in regards to Prevention of Significant Deterioration and New Source Performance Standard, does not require the same regulatory implementation.

Court membership
- Chief Justice John Roberts Associate Justices John P. Stevens · Antonin Scalia; Anthony Kennedy · David Souter; Clarence Thomas · Ruth Bader Ginsburg; Stephen Breyer · Samuel Alito

Case opinions
- Majority: Souter, joined by Roberts, Stevens, Scalia, Kennedy, Ginsburg, Breyer, Alito; Thomas (all but Part III–A)
- Concurrence: Thomas (in part)

Laws applied
- Clean Air Act

Environmental Defense v. Duke Energy Corporation, 549 U.S. 561 (2007), is a United States Supreme Court case in which the Court held that while a term may be used more than once in a statute, an agency has the discretion to interpret each use of the term in a different way based on the context. It involved the Environmental Defense Fund and Duke Energy. In a unanimous decision, the court held in favor of the plaintiff's (Environmental Defense) argument.

This case addressed the Clean Air Act (CAA) and two of its programs, Prevention of Significant Deterioration (PSD) and New Source Performance Standard (NSPS). PSD applies to regulating annual emissions; NSPS pertains to regulating hourly emissions, although the defendants argued that the hourly emissions of their facilities remained unchanged. Each section of the Clean Air Act, that outlines the provisions of the PSD and the NSPS, defines "modification" differently. As a result, the inconsistency of the term "modification" in the CAA becomes the main debate of the case and the main argument for both the plaintiffs and defendants.

== Parties ==
=== Plaintiffs ===
The Environmental Defense Fund (EDF) is a nonprofit organization that works to reduce threats to the earth's environment that impact the climate, ocean, and ecosystems. The EDF was founded in 1967, in response to implications from usage of DDT. Today, with more than 2 million members, the EDF uses scientific support, economics, and environmental law to solve environmental problems. Additionally, the EDF develops "unlikely" partnerships to broaden support and expand reach for various issues.

=== Defendants ===
Duke Energy Corporation is a large-scale power company and utility in the United States that supplies and delivers electricity to nearly 7.4 million customers, covering a 50,000 square mile service territory. The company's electricity generation portfolio is composed predominantly of natural gas, nuclear, oil, and coal-fired power, as well as some renewable energy. The electrical generating capacity of Duke Energy totals 52,700 megawatts. The company has $133 billion in assets and approximately 28,800 employees. The company's mission is to provide electric services "in a sustainable way – affordable, reliable, clean".

== Background ==
=== Clean Air Act ===
The US Clean Air Act was enacted in 1963. It was the federal government's first major step towards air pollution control. Currently the CAA regulates six criteria air contaminants from stationary sources: particulate matter, lead, ozone, nitrogen oxides, carbon monoxide, and sulfur oxides. Amendments have been added to the CAA, in 1970, 1977, and 1990. Objective of the regulation is to "protect human health, welfare and the environment by maintaining and improving the quality of the air through the development of standards".

=== New Source Performance Standards ===
The New Source Performance Standards, 42 U.S.C. 7411, was added to the CAA in 1970 and is a required permitting process in an attainment and non-attainment area. The NSPS imposes emission standards for pollutants in new or reconstructed stationary sources that undergo "modification." The controls are technology based, as set by the EPA, but are delegated to the states to implement through their State Implementation Plan (SIP).

The CAA defines "modification" under the NSPS as "any physical change in, or change in the method of operation of, a stationary source which increases the amount of any air emitted by such source or which results in the emission of any air pollution not previously emitted." If there is a "modification," a physical change in the source's method of operation would increase the emission rate of pollution expressed in kilograms per hour (kg/h).

=== Prevention of Significant Deterioration ===
When a pollutant source is in an attainment area, it becomes subject to the PSD permitting process. The PSD is part of the New Source Review program and was added to the CAA in 1977 with the goal of not allowing the good air to deteriorate, since it is only required for areas of attainment. The PSD is focused on air quality in the region, in regards to health effects, as opposed to the emission technology. While some argue that the PSD is not needed as the public health is protected by National Ambient Air Quality Standards (NAAQS), others may say that the PSD prevents the "flight of industry" from dirty to clean areas that are in attainment, as they would not have to comply with as strict of regulations. Before this program was implemented, there was nothing in place that addressed potential air quality deterioration.

The CAA defines "modification" under the PSD as "net annual emissions increase". This is when the actual emissions from a pollutant source would increase the average for the two prior years; "any physical change in or change in the method of operation of a major stationary source that would result in: a significant emissions increase of a regulated NSR pollutant; and a significant net emissions increase of that pollutant from the major stationary source."

== Case ==
In 1988, Duke Energy Corporation began a series of improvements to its eight power plants in order to modernize its facilities, taking twelve years to complete. The power generation plants were coal-fire powered and utilized "boilers and steam turbines". The improvements incorporated alterations to the boilers as well as portions of "waterwalls, superheaters, and reheaters". The work was costly but would allow Duke's facilities to run with full capability without having various units down.

On December 22, 2000, the EPA filed suit against Duke Energy Corporation in District Court, for the 29 alterations to their power plants that had been performed. The EPA claimed they had lacked the proper PSD permits and in doing so, violated the CAA. Duke argued that their improvements did not fall within the scope of the PSD program because the power plants' hourly emissions rate would not be altered. Shortly thereafter, three other environmental groups, led by Environmental Defense, joined the EPA in the suit. Environmental Defense, on the other hand, believed that by improving the plants, Duke would be able to run for longer hours, causing the "total annual emissions" to increase. This they believed, constituted the need for PSD to apply.

=== Arguments ===
Environmental Defense argued that Duke Energy had violated the CAA under PSD by failing to receive permits to conduct modifications to their power plants. The modifications made would increase net emissions per year. The term "modification" in the PSD provision relates to an overall increase of "annual emissions" rather than an increase in "hourly emissions", as Environmental Defense argues. They also contended that the D.C. Circuit was the necessary court to handle this case and not the Fourth Circuit. They believed the Fourth Circuit did not have authority to make a decision on this case because the CAA is "statutorily delegated to the D.C. Circuit".

Duke Energy Corporation argued that its improvements did not need a permit because the changes had not increased their hourly rate of emissions. The NSPS defines "modification" as an increase in emissions per hour and the same definition must be applied to the PSD. The renovations were needed as a result of physical deterioration and age of the plants and modernization was necessary to avoid replacement. Throughout their renovations, the hourly emission rates were kept constant and Duke argued they had not violated the PSD provisions. Concerning whether the Fourth District had authority to rule in this case, Duke believed they did since it was only an issue of interpreting provisions. Exclusive jurisdiction by the D.C. Circuit was according to Congress, only regarding "actions brought to enforce the PSD provisions." Duke argued that if the Fourth Circuit could not interpret regulations in this manner, it would present "serious constitutional questions regarding the availability of judicial review" by keeping courts from carrying out their duty to assert the law.

=== District Court opinion ===
Knowing that analysis of the pertinent Clean Air Act amendments was difficult, the District Court allowed flexibility to the EPA in interpreting these amendments as well as their own regulations and should be given "controlling weight unless it is plainly erroneous or inconsistent with the regulation." The court also acknowledged that this flexibility does not allow the EPA "unbridled discretion" to interpret the Clean Air Act amendments freely. The court is still responsible for deciphering if the EPA's analysis agrees with Congress's objective.

On August 26, 2003 the District Court composed a "three-faceted holding" based on whether:

1.) the "modification" completed was a "routine maintenance, repair and replacement"; 2.) a "net emissions increase" occurs only when the "hourly rate of emission increases"; 3.) Duke's failure to obtain a PSD permit before performing its modifications represented an ongoing violation for statute of limitations purposes.

The major finding at this court level was that in regards to the PSD regulation, a "net increase" of emissions can only occur when there is an increase in the hourly rate of emission. Although Duke had increased their hours of operation, they had not altered the hourly emission rate at its plants. Because of this, the District Court held that there had been no net increase of emission and Duke had not violated the PSD regulation and so, had not needed to acquire a permit for a major modification.

=== Fourth Circuit opinion ===
Environmental Defense appealed to the United States Court of Appeals for the Fourth Circuit, which affirmed the District Court's ruling. The Fourth Circuit stated that different meanings of the word "modification" are not possible because Congress made clear that the legislative definition of "modification" were the same in both the PSD and NSPS regulations. And thus the EPA could not interpret "modification" differently in either regulation but must interpret the term "consistently and uniformly for the purposes of both sets of regulations". The Fourth Circuit decision depended on precedent set by the Rowan case. After the 4th Circuit decision, the plaintiff and intervenor environmental groups filed a petition for certiorari with the Supreme Court. Both Duke Energy and the United States objected this action, however, the Supreme Court granted the petition on May 15, 2006.

Rowan Companies Inc. v. United States is a related case in that it also concerns interpreting the same single term in two different regulations. In this case, the word "wages" was interpreted differently in two tax provisions by the Internal Revenue Service (IRS). The Supreme Court stated that the differing interpretations were impermissible because the IRS lacked the ability to interpret "wages" differently within the framework of this case. In this instance, the judgment affirms the general belief that "the same words, when repeated, carry the same meaning."

== Supreme Court decision ==
The judgment of the Court of Appeals was vacated and remanded. Justice Souter delivered the opinion of the Court.

It was found that the EPA did not have to interpret "modification" in PSD regulations the same way the term is interpreted in New Source Performance Standard regulations. The Court's opinion recognized that two uses of the same term, with the same definition, usually would mean the same thing. Yet in this instance, the term "modification" and its definition differ broadly. The Court concluded that "EPA's construction need do no more than fall within the limits of what is reasonable, as set by the Act's common definition."

Justice Thomas wrote separately to note that although he agrees with the substantive ruling on the matter, he did not agree with the dicta in Part III-A of the Court's opinion. Thomas believed that the EPA could not have different regulatory definitions of "modification" under PSD and NSPS. He also states that the Court should still apply its "usual presumption that the same words repeated in different parts of the same statute have the same meaning" and does not believe the Court's opinion overcame this presumption.

== Significance ==
The Supreme Court's decision demonstrates how discretion is given to the agency in interpreting regulations and definitions. Utilizing the Chevron test (Chevron U.S.A., Inc. v. Natural Resources Defense Council, Inc.)), the agency can determine whether the statutory language is vague. For future implications, agencies may be able to alter regulatory requirements to make compliance more complex or costly. Conversely, the precedent set in this case could allow a more thorough Congress to limit this type of agency discretion in the future.

This ruling was also significant because it provided a precedent that favored stronger regulation of stationary pollution sources. Even though the rate of emissions per hour would not have increased, the net emission per year would have due to increased hours of operation. As a result, the air quality was considered to be adversely impacted. The Duke decision may signify that the Court will take environmental policy into consideration more in the future. The decision shows that the Supreme Court is more likely to interpret environmental laws in line with the legislation's objective rather than following the order of constricted rules of "statutory construction".
