= Global Crossing Telecommunications, Inc. v. Metrophones Telecommunications, Inc. =

- Supreme Court of the United States

Decided April 17, 2007
- Full case name: Global Crossing Telecommunications, Inc. v. Metrophones Telecommunications, Inc.
- Citations: 550 U.S. 45 (more)

Holding
- Payphone operators have a private right to sue telephone carriers for failure to pay reimbursement required by the FCC under the Communications Act of 1934.

Court membership
- Chief Justice John Roberts Associate Justices John P. Stevens · Antonin Scalia; Anthony Kennedy · David Souter; Clarence Thomas · Ruth Bader Ginsburg; Stephen Breyer · Samuel Alito

Case opinions
- Majority: Breyer, joined by Roberts, Stevens, Kennedy, Souter, Ginsburg, Alito
- Dissent: Scalia
- Dissent: Thomas

Laws applied
- Communications Act of 1934

Global Crossing Telecommunications, Inc. v. Metrophones Telecommunications, Inc., 550 U.S. 45 (2007), was a United States Supreme Court case in which the court held that payphone operators have a private right to sue telephone carriers for failure to pay reimbursement required by the FCC under the Communications Act of 1934.

== Background ==
Under authority of the Communications Act of 1934, the Federal Communications Commission (FCC) regulates interstate telephone communications using a traditional regulatory system similar to what other commissions have applied when regulating other common carriers. Indeed, Congress largely copied language from the earlier Interstate Commerce Act, which authorized federal railroad regulation, when it wrote Sections 201(b) and 207 of the Communications Act, the provisions at issue in this case. Both Acts authorize their respective commissions to declare any carrier "charge," "regulation," or "practice" in connection with the carrier's services to be "unjust or unreasonable"; declare an "unreasonable," e.g., "charge" to be "unlawful"; authorize an injured person to recover "damages" for an "unlawful" charge or practice; and state that, to do so, the person may bring suit in a "court" "of the United States."

However, the traditional regulatory scheme clashed with the newer technology, which was more competitively oriented. Legislation in 1990 required payphone operators to allow payphone users to obtain "free" access to the long-distance carrier of their choice, i.e., access without depositing coins. However, recognizing the "free" call would impose a cost upon the payphone operator, so Congress required the FCC to promulgate regulations to provide compensation to such operators. Using traditional ratemaking methods, the FCC ordered carriers to reimburse the operators in a specified amount unless a carrier and an operator agreed to a different amount. The FCC subsequently determined that a carrier's refusal to pay such compensation was an "unreasonable practice" and thus unlawful under §201(b).

Metrophones Telecommunications, a payphone operator, brought a federal lawsuit, claiming that Global Crossing Telecommunications, a long-distance carrier, had violated §201(b) by failing to pay compensation and that §207 authorized Metrophones to sue in federal court. The federal District Court agreed that Global Crossing's refusal to pay violated §201(b), thereby permitting respondent to sue under §207. The Ninth Circuit Court of Appeals affirmed.

== Opinion of the court ==
The Supreme Court issued an opinion on April 17, 2007.

== Later developments ==
Another dispute between operators and carriers reached the Supreme Court the next term. Although Global Crossing established that the private right to sue exists, the litigation costs of these sorts of suits are prohibitive. Thus, payphone operators assigned their right to sue to collections agencies. In Sprint Communications Co. v. APCC Services, Inc., the Court held that this sort of assignment was acceptable and that the suits could go forward.
