= Hinck v. United States =

- Supreme Court of the United States

Decided May 21, 2007
- Full case name: Hinck v. United States
- Citations: 550 U.S. 501 (more)

Holding
- The Tax Court is the exclusive forum for judicial review of claims about interest abatement under the Internal Revenue Code.

Court membership
- Chief Justice John Roberts Associate Justices John P. Stevens · Antonin Scalia; Anthony Kennedy · David Souter; Clarence Thomas · Ruth Bader Ginsburg; Stephen Breyer · Samuel Alito

Case opinion
- Majority: Roberts, joined by unanimous

Laws applied
- Internal Revenue Code §6404(e)(1)

Hinck v. United States, 550 U.S. 501 (2007), was a United States Supreme Court case in which the court held that the Tax Court is the exclusive forum for judicial review of claims about interest abatement under the Internal Revenue Code.

== Background ==
A 1986 amendment to the Internal Revenue Code permits the United States Treasury Secretary to abate interest that accrues on unpaid federal income taxes if the interest assessment is attributable to Internal Revenue Service (IRS) error or delay. This is codified in 26 U.S.C. §6404(e)(1). Subsequently, the federal district courts uniformly held that the Secretary's decision not to abate was not subject to judicial review.

In 1996, Congress added what is now §6404(h), which states that the Tax Court has "jurisdiction over any action brought by a taxpayer who meets the requirements referred to in section 7430(c)(4)(A)(ii) to determine whether the Secretary's failure to abate... was an abuse of discretion, and may order an abatement, if such action is brought within 180 days after the date of the mailing of the Secretary's final determination not to abate...". Section 7430(c)(4)(A)(ii), in turn, incorporates 28 U. S. C. §2412(d)(2)(B), which refers to people with a net worth not exceeding $2 million and businesses with a net worth not exceeding $7 million.

The IRS denied Hinck's request for abatement of interest assessed in 1999 for the period from March 21, 1989 to April 1, 1993. Hinck then filed suit in the Court of Federal Claims seeking review of the refusal to abate. The court granted the government's motion to dismiss, and the Federal Circuit affirmed, holding that §6404(h) vests exclusive jurisdiction to review interest abatement claims in the Tax Court.

== Opinion of the court ==
The Supreme Court issued an opinion on May 21, 2007.

The court articulated that the statute was so specific and detailed that its grant of jurisdiction to the Tax Court impliedly stripped the federal district courts and the Court of Federal Claims of their jurisdiction over these interest abatement matters.

== Later developments ==
This case was one of a number of early Roberts Court decisions shielding the federal government from exposure to lawsuits in federal district courts.

Later courts held that other parts of the Internal Revenue Code gave the Tax Court exclusive jurisdiction over other matters.
