= Gonzales v. Duenas-Alvarez =

- Supreme Court of the United States

Decided January 17, 2007
- Full case name: Gonzales v. Duenas-Alvarez
- Citations: 549 U.S. 183 (more)

Holding
- The term "theft offense" in the Immigration and Nationality Act includes the crime of "aiding and abetting" a theft offense.

Court membership
- Chief Justice John Roberts Associate Justices John P. Stevens · Antonin Scalia; Anthony Kennedy · David Souter; Clarence Thomas · Ruth Bader Ginsburg; Stephen Breyer · Samuel Alito

Case opinions
- Majority: Breyer, joined by Roberts, Scalia, Kennedy, Souter, Thomas, Ginsburg, Alito; Stevens (Parts I, II, III-B)
- Concur/dissent: Stevens

Laws applied
- Immigration and Nationality Act

Gonzales v. Duenas-Alvarez, 549 U.S. 183 (2007), was a United States Supreme Court case in which the court held that the term "theft offense" in the Immigration and Nationality Act includes the crime of "aiding and abetting" a theft offense.

== Background ==
Duenas-Alvarez, a permanent resident, was convicted of violating Cal. Veh. Code Ann. §10851(a), under which "[a]ny person who drives or takes a vehicle not his or her own, without the consent of the owner... , or any person who is a party or an accessory to or an accomplice in the driving or unauthorized taking or stealing, is guilty of a public offense." The federal government then sought to deport Duenas-Alvarez from the United States as a non-citizen convicted of "a theft offense... for which the term of imprisonment [is] at least one year" under the Immigration and Nationality Act's removal provisions.

The government claimed that the California conviction qualified as such a "theft offense" under the framework set forth in Taylor v. United States. In Taylor, the Court considered whether a prior conviction for violating a state statute criminalizing certain burglary-like behavior fell within the term "burglary" for sentence-enhancement purposes under federal criminal law. The Supreme Court held that Congress meant that term to refer to "burglary" in "the generic sense in which the term is now used in the criminal codes of most States." Further, the court said that a sentencing court seeking to determine whether a particular prior conviction was for generic burglary should normally look to the state statute defining the crime of conviction, not to the facts of the particular prior case. However, where state law defines burglary broadly to include crimes falling outside generic "burglary," the sentencer should "go beyond the mere fact of conviction" and examine, for example, the charging document and jury instructions to determine whether the earlier "jury was actually required to find all the elements of generic burglary". The federal Immigration Judge and the Board of Immigration Appeals (BIA) found Duenas-Alvarez removable, but the Ninth Circuit Court of Appeals, summarily remanded in light of its earlier Penuliar decision holding that "aiding and abetting" a theft is not itself a crime under the generic definition of theft.

The Supreme Court granted certiorari.

== Opinion of the court ==
The Supreme Court issued an opinion on January 17, 2007.

In the immigration context, this case established the categorical approach test for comparing state crimes to federal standards. The test for immigration differs somewhat from Taylor v. United States. The categorical approach for immigration is a "reasonable probability" test.
