= Lawrence v. Florida =

- Supreme Court of the United States

Decided February 20, 2007
- Full case name: Lawrence v. Florida
- Citations: 549 U.S. 327 (more)

Holding
- The statute of limitations for seeking federal habeas relief from a state decision is not tolled while a certiorari petition is pending with the United States Supreme Court because it is tolled only during review by state courts.

Court membership
- Chief Justice John Roberts Associate Justices John P. Stevens · Antonin Scalia; Anthony Kennedy · David Souter; Clarence Thomas · Ruth Bader Ginsburg; Stephen Breyer · Samuel Alito

Case opinions
- Majority: Thomas, joined by Roberts, Scalia, Kennedy, Alito
- Dissent: Ginsburg, joined by Stevens, Souter, Breyer

Lawrence v. Florida, 549 U.S. 327 (2007), was a United States Supreme Court case in which the court held that the statute of limitations for seeking federal habeas relief from a state decision is not tolled while a certiorari petition is pending with the United States Supreme Court because it is tolled only during review by state courts.

== Background ==
Under 28 U. S. C. §2244(d)(2), the one-year statute of limitations for seeking federal habeas relief from a state-court judgment is tolled while an "application for State post-conviction or other collateral review" "is pending". Lawrence filed a state post-conviction relief application 364 days after his conviction became final. The trial court denied relief, the Florida Supreme Court affirmed, and the Supreme Court denied certiorari. Thus, that case concluded.

While that certiorari petition was pending, Lawrence filed a federal habeas application. Then-applicable precedent from the Eleventh Circuit Court of Appeals foreclosed any argument that the limitations period was tolled by the pendency of the certiorari petition. Thus, the federal District Court dismissed Lawrence's application as untimely because he waited 113 days after the State Supreme Court's mandate, which was after the one day that remained in the limitations period. The Eleventh Circuit affirmed.

The Supreme Court granted certiorari.

== Opinion of the court ==
The Supreme Court issued an opinion on February 20, 2007.

== Later developments ==
In Lawrence, the court declined to decide whether AEDPA claims are subject to equitable tolling generally. The court later decided that AEDPA claims are subject to equitable tolling in Holland v. Florida.
