= Weyerhaeuser Co. v. Ross-Simmons Hardwood Lumber Co. =

Weyerhaeuser Company v. Ross-Simmons Hardwood Lumber Company
- Supreme Court of the United States

Argued November 28, 2006 Decided February 20, 2007
- Full case name: Weyerhaeuser Company, Petitioner v. Ross-Simmons Hardwood Lumber Company, Inc.
- Citations: 549 U.S. 312 (more) 127 S. Ct. 1069; 166 L. Ed. 2d 911; 2007 U.S. LEXIS 1333; 75 U.S.L.W. 4091; 2007-1 Trade Cas. (CCH) ¶ 75,601; 20 Fla. L. Weekly Fed. S 77

Court membership
- Chief Justice John Roberts Associate Justices John P. Stevens · Antonin Scalia; Anthony Kennedy · David Souter; Clarence Thomas · Ruth Bader Ginsburg; Stephen Breyer · Samuel Alito

Case opinion
- Majority: Thomas, joined by unanimous

Weyerhaeuser Company v. Ross-Simmons Hardwood Lumber Company, 549 U.S. 312 (2007), is a decision of the Supreme Court of the United States in which the Court held that the Court's decision in Brooke Group Ltd. v. Brown & Williamson Tobacco Corp. did not apply in predatory purchasing cases.
