= List of United States Supreme Court cases, volume 549 =

This is a list of all the United States Supreme Court cases from volume 549 of the United States Reports:

Case name	Citation	Date decided
Purcell v. Gonzalez	549 U.S. 1	October 20, 2006
Ayers v. Belmontes	549 U.S. 7	2006
A catch-all jury instruction allowing consideration of "any other circumstance which extenuates the gravity of the crime even though it is not a legal excuse for the crime" permits the jury to consider a defendant's post-crime evidence and is consistent with the constitutional right to present mitigating evidence in death-penalty sentencing.
Lopez v. Gonzales	549 U.S. 47	2006
Conduct that is a misdemeanor under the federal Controlled Substances Act is not a "felony punishable under the Controlled Substances Act," and hence an aggravated felony that makes an eligible for deportation, even if that conduct constitutes a felony under state law.
Toledo-Flores v. United States	549 U.S. 69	2006
Dismissed as improvidently granted.
Carey v. Musladin	549 U.S. 70	2006
State appellate court's determination that defendant was not deprived of his right to a fair trial when courtroom spectators wore buttons depicting murder victim was not "contrary to or unreasonable application of clearly established law."
BP Am. Production Co. v. Burton	549 U.S. 84	2006
A statute of limitations on government actions for contract claims does not apply to actions by a federal administrative agency to recover royalties on federal oil and gas leases.
United States v. Resendiz-Ponce	549 U.S. 102	January 9, 2007
An indictment alleging attempted reentry under 8 U.S.C §1326(a) need not specifically allege a particular overt act or any other component part of the offense.
MedImmune, Inc. v. Genentech, Inc.	549 U.S. 118	2007
Burton v. Stewart	549 U.S. 147	2007
Norfolk S. R.R. Co. v. Sorrell	549 U.S. 158	2007
The same causation standard applies to railroad negligence under FELA Section 1 as to employee contributory negligence under Section 3.
Gonzales v. Duenas-Alvarez	549 U.S. 183	2007
The term "theft offense" in 8 U. S. C. §1101(a)(43)(G) includes the crime of "aiding and abetting" a theft offense.
Jones v. Bock	549 U.S. 199	2007
Osborn v. Haley	549 U.S. 225	2007
Although 28 U.S.C. § 1447(d) generally prevents appeals of decisions to remand removed cases back to state court, that statute does not apply to cases removed under the Westfall Act.
Cunningham v. California	549 U.S. 270	2007
Weyerhaeuser Co. v. Ross-Simmons Hardwood Lumber Co.	549 U.S. 312	2007
Lawrence v. Florida	549 U.S. 327	2007
The statute of limitations for seeking federal habeas relief from a state decision is not tolled while a certiorari petition is pending with the United States Supreme Court because it is tolled only during review by state courts.
Philip Morris USA v. Williams	549 U.S. 346	2007
A punitive damages award based in part on a jury’s desire to punish a defendant for harming nonparties amounts to a taking of property from the defendant without due process.
Marrama v. Citizens Bank	549 U.S. 365	2007
Wallace v. Kato	549 U.S. 384	2007
The statute of limitations upon a §1983 claim seeking damages for a false arrest in violation of the Fourth Amendment, where the arrest is followed by criminal proceedings, begins to run at the time the claimant becomes detained pursuant to legal process and not when the charges based on the arrest are dropped.
Whorton v. Bockting	549 U.S. 406	2007
Sinochem International Co., Ltd. v. Malaysia International Shipping Corporation	549 U.S. 422	2007
A United States district court has discretion to respond at once to a defendant's forum non conveniens plea, and need not take up first any other threshold objection.
Lance v. Coffman	549 U.S. 437	2007
Travelers Casualty & Surety Co. v. Pac. Gas & Elec. Co.	549 U.S. 443	2007
Federal bankruptcy law does not disallow unsecured contract-based claims for attorney’s fees based solely on the fact that the fees were incurred litigating bankruptcy law issues.
Rockwell Int'l Corp. v. United States	549 U.S. 457	2007
Limtiaco v. Camacho	549 U.S. 483	2007
Under the Organic Act of Guam, tax assessment value must be used to calculate Guam's debt ceiling, not market value.
Massachusetts v. Environmental Protection Agency	549 U.S. 497	2007
Greenhouse gases are air pollutants, and the States may sue the United States Environmental Protection Agency if it fails to properly regulate these pollutants.
Environmental Defense v. Duke Energy Corp.	549 U.S. 561	2007
