= Parental leave in the United States =

Right to leave regulated by US labor law

Parental leave (also known as family leave) is an employment-protected leave of absence regulated in the United States by US labor law and state law. The Family and Medical Leave Act of 1993 (FMLA) requires 12 weeks of unpaid leave annually for parents of newborn or newly adopted children if they work for a company with 50 or more employees. As of October 1, 2020, the same policy has been extended to caregivers of sick family members or a partner in direct relation to the child's birth, therefore responsible for the mother's care. Although 12 weeks are allowed for American fathers, they only take 10 days off on average due to financial need. That is below the 16-week minimum recommended by the World Health Organization.

Currently, twelve states and the District of Columbia have enacted laws to provide paid leave and paid parental leave to employees. An additional 10 states offer a voluntary paid leave option that provides optional paid leave coverage that employers and individuals can purchase through private insurers. As of 2024, the United States is the only country among the 38 member OECD nations that has not passed laws requiring businesses and corporations to offer paid maternity leave to their employees. While the United States does not mandate paid parental leave, proponents argue that this labor market flexibility upholds principles of economic freedom and allows businesses to offer higher wages, as reflected in the U.S.'s position among the top OECD countries for average earnings even after adjusting for purchasing power.

== History ==
Between 1961 and 1965, only 14% of mothers participated in the workforce within six months of their child's birth. During the same period, only 44% of mothers worked during their pregnancy. The first set of maternity leave-related policies emerged after World War I, when first-wave feminists lobbied for a women's health bill to give grants to states to provide healthcare for women and children. By 1969, five states had enacted temporary disability insurance laws to protect employees from income loss in the occurrence of a temporary medical disability. Under that legislation, new mothers were granted leaves corresponding to the benefits that other employees received for temporary illness or disability. Changes to the federal tax code in 1976 permitted working families with a dependent child to take a tax credit on child care costs. In 1978, the Pregnancy Discrimination Act (PDA) prohibited employers from treating a woman unfavorably because of pregnancy, childbirth, or a medical condition related to pregnancy or childbirth.

A landmark case in 1987, California Federal Savings and Loan Association v. Guerra, upheld a California law requiring most employers to grant pregnant women four months of unpaid disability leave and the right to return to the same job. That state-level trend of maternity leave legislation continued into the 1970s and 1980s, where multiple other states passed more explicit recognitions of new mothers' rights to a temporary leave of absence. Ultimately, 12 states and the District of Columbia had implemented measures requiring at least some private sector employers to offer maternity leave packages to their employees. Even in the absence of formal legislation, employees in other states often obtained maternity leave by collective bargaining. Employees frequently held enough bargaining power to influence employer policies and to negotiate for the inclusion of maternity leave protection.

Despite some localized employees' access to maternity leave, there was growing pressure for national maternity leave legislation in the early 1990s. Many new mothers continued to be excluded from such maternity leave provisions despite growing national demand. Until the enactment of Family and Medical Leave Act in 1993, maternity leave coverage was governed by state law, collective bargaining agreements, and employer policies. Women now enjoyed greater employment opportunities and changing gender norms that encouraged increased labor involvement. That increased female employment also extended to mothers, who now were now more likely to engage in the workforce even if they had a young child. The labor participation rate of mothers with children aged less than one rose from 31% in 1976 to 54% in 1992. The contribution of women's earnings to their family income rose from 26.6% in 1970 to 36% in 2008. In spite of a high labor force participation rate, only an estimated 40% of working women had access to explicit maternity leave protection. That inadequate national coverage provoked intense protest and growing national consensus on the value of maternity leave. Ultimately, the increased salience and galvanized national support prompted the enactment of the Family and Medical Leave Act of 1993, mandating maternity leave.

Although the Family and Medical Leave Act required employers to guarantee job-protected, unpaid leave up to 12 weeks after the birth or adoption of a new child, an estimated 41% of employees in the United States were not covered in 2012. Nearly two-thirds of mothers had to work during their pregnancies between 2002 and 2008. By 2012, only 14% of US fathers had access to paid family leave as an employee benefit. About two-thirds of employees (68%) had access to paid sick leave, and 38% had access to short-term disability benefits. Before the FMLA, the term "family" referred to a nuclear family with two parents of opposite sexes and the "mother" could bear a child. That was the only definition acknowledged by medical and economic research done before the LGBTQ rights movement. Only recently have studies caught up to a modern and more inclusive definition of a family.

== Current legislation ==
In the United States, parents and family are federally protected under the 1993 Family and Medical Leave Act (FMLA) to go on maternity or family leave after the adoption or birth of a child. Under this law, legal parents are protected for up to 12 weeks of unpaid leave (per year). The FMLA ensures the job security of parents/employees but does not protect employees who go on paid leave with their employers. Receiving the correct payment for being on leave is between the firm and the employee. However, some states have laws that do protect and guarantee employees for paid family leave (see State Legislation). Additionally, the FMLA defines "parents" as biological, adoptive, step or foster parent who stood in loco parentis or "in the place of a parent". Parents do not include parents-in-law.

This paragraph is for employees who are seeking to get paid using their firm's extended policies on leaves. If employees choose to go on maternity or family leave, The Employee's Guide to Family and Medical Leave Act states that they can sometimes use their unspent sick leave or annual leave, saved up with their employer at the same time of their FMLA leave so that they continue to get paid. To use such leave, "you must follow your employer's normal leave rules such as submitting a leave form or providing advance notice. Even if you don't want to use your paid leave, your employer can require you to use it during your FMLA leave".

If employees choose to use the FMLA to go on regular unpaid leave without any extended or paid leave, the FMLA has several limiting stipulations and leaves out certain employees' conditions, such as temporary workers and trans employees, meaning only certain employees are eligible. To receive maternity leave protections under FMLA, employees must:

- Work for a covered employer;
- Have worked 1,250 hours during the 12 months prior to the start of leave; (special hours of service rules apply to airline flight crew members)
- Work at a location where the employer has 50 or more employees within 75 miles; and
- Have worked for the employer for 12 months.

The 12 months of employment are not required to be consecutive in order for the employee to qualify for FMLA leave. In general, only employment within seven years is counted unless the break in service is (1) due to an employee's fulfilment of military obligations or (2) governed by a collective bargaining agreement or other written agreement.

The FMLA is the only law that federally protects American employees who go on maternity or family leave their resumed job security. It was signed into law during President Bill Clinton's first term in 1993 and revised on February 23, 2015, to include same-sex parents and spouses. Two other federal laws, the Pregnancy Discrimination Act (PDA) and the Patient Protection and Affordable Care Act's (PPACA, also known as the Affordable Care Act, the ACA or Obamacare) amendment of the Fair Labor Standards Act, provide some additional protection for parents on the birth of a child. For instance, the PDA upholds maternity leave by arguing that employees who give temporarily disabled folks a disability leave should give pregnant women maternity leave with the same protections and benefits. Essentially, the PDA of 1978 argues pregnant women should have rights to the same paid or unpaid leave that temporarily disabled workers are afforded by their employers. If an employer offers this protection to temporarily disabled workers, then the PDA says that pregnant women should also be protected using the same processes and the same benefits. Additionally, in 2014, the PPACA amendment to the Fair Labor Standards Act made it so that all insurance companies had to include maternity coverage in individual insurance plans. Therefore, it fills the gap for unemployed women with individual insurance coverage plans to be able to afford the prenatal and postnatal pregnancy care that they need to have a healthy baby. Maternity care came to include:

- Outpatient services, such as prenatal and postnatal doctor visits, gestational diabetes screenings, lab studies, medications, etc.
- Inpatient services, such as hospitalization, physician fees, etc.
- Newborn baby care
- Lactation counselling and breast pump rental

These federal laws and amendments have increased the accessibility and quality of care for prenatal and postnatal mothers and families. For example, before the Affordable Care Act, only 12% of insurance plans sold in the individual market included maternity coverage. Also, according to a journal study on FMLA by researchers at the University of Maryland, it was found that mothers who benefitted from FMLA returned to the same job sooner, which depicts the impact of job stability for mothers. Nonetheless, many employees are still ineligible for the FMLA. According to the Family and Medical Leave Report in 2012, only 59% of American employees were eligible under the FMLA. Additionally, female employees who returned after FMLA were given lower wages than when they left. This comes from the same study by researchers at the University of Maryland. These lower wages may not have been permanent since the study only went to highlight women's experience with maternity leave two years after they left.

In polls from 2017, Democrats and Republicans both are in high support of federal funding for paid maternity and family leave. According to a study done by the Brookings Institution, a non-profit think tank in D.C., 71% of Republicans and 83% of Democrats support a paid leave policy. Although the study did not reach a particular compromise on how the policies should work, who should pay for it, how much, and other concerns that might factor into creating a universal paid parental leave policy, it reached a conclusion. Among the diverse group of researchers with different political and economic views, everyone believed that it is worthwhile to consider a federal paid leave policy. One reason is that the "US is the only advanced country that provides no public support to new parents."

The US does not have a federal paid maternity and family leave act. Some states, however, include paid leave legislation for family members. States like California, New Jersey, and New York have pioneered paid leave legislation in their respective states. Reasons for paid leave might include higher job security for women and reducing women's need for public assistance. A study by the Institute for Women's Research has also shown that paid leave could reduce employer costs and lead to US economic growth. Also, paid family leave has been shown to increase the health of the family by lowering infant mortality rates. Paid family leave would also allow low-income families the ability to take care of their family members without having to sacrifice time and money. Reasons for not having a protected paid family leave policy in place might be justified by the fact that there are limited economic resources to sustain a program. Additionally, some may disagree with the overreach of the government in taking on the responsibility to keep families afloat on leave. Compared to some other countries, the US remains behind in terms of maternity leave legislation.

=== State legislation ===
As of 2025, twelve states and the District of Columbia have put into effect mandatory paid family leave programs. The states with paid family leave include Maryland, Washington, California, Oregon, Delaware, Maine, New York, Colorado, Connecticut, Massachusetts, Rhode Island, New Jersey, and the District of Columbia. In addition, New Hampshire and Vermont implemented voluntary opt-in paid family leave programs that companies and individuals can choose to pay for.

Many states have supplemented these federal regulations and provided more extensive maternity leave benefits, including expanding paid or flexible sick time, expanding access for workers in smaller companies or with less time on the job, right to pump that expands on federal law, and pregnancy accommodations.

As of 2016, 12 states have enacted no additional laws or programs to support family leave before or after birth. Fourteen states, along with the District of Columbia, have addressed eligibility requirements by lowering the firm-size threshold from 50 or more employees down to as low as 10 employees. Seven other states, in addition to the District of Columbia, have adopted more generous maternity leave lengths that allow longer absences for the purpose of child-rearing. Moreover, some states have enacted legislation enhancing the benefits of leave programs. As of 2022, California, Colorado, Connecticut, the District of Columbia, Hawaii, Massachusetts, New Jersey, New Mexico, New York, Oregon, Puerto Rico, and Washington have all enacted laws requiring paid family and medical leave beyond the federal laws.

California, New Jersey, and Rhode Island, for instance, operate programs that require private-sector employers to pay their employees who utilize maternity leave at partial replacement rates. New York passed paid family leave legislation, which includes maternity leave, in 2016—starting off at 8 weeks and 50% of pay in 2018, and reaching 12 weeks and 67% of pay in 2021. California's 2004 Paid Family Leave Act (PFLA) offers payment to birth mothers, fathers, and adoptive parents as well as aid to caregivers and military families. Those who spend their time caring for a terminally ill are protected under PFLA as a caregiver. Similarly, individuals sending a family member off to a foreign country to act in the military are protected as military assistants. While the PFLA offers paid leave for these individuals, it does not include job security as that falls under the ruling of the FMLA and the California Family Rights Act.

Hawaii, Puerto Rico, and the District of Columbia designate childbirth as a temporary disability thus guaranteeing mothers paid maternity leave through Disability Insurance (TDI) provisions.

On December 31, 2019, New Mexico Governor Michelle Lujan Grisham signed an executive order installing paid family leave for state employees, the first such policy in the state. The order, providing 12 weeks of paid family leave for state employees under the Governor's direct purview, became effective January 1, 2020.

On January 1, 2022, Connecticut enacted a policy allowing 16 weeks of parental leave per year should any unforeseen changes or issues arise during the birth.

Currently, Oregon protects 12 weeks of leave for parents following a birth; however, it is unpaid time unless sick days or vacation days are used for it. The state implemented a reformed parental leave law that was put in place in 2023. The new law promises paid leave following births as well as the ability to be granted an additional 12-week paid leave if there is a complication to the mother as a result of birth or a complication with the child's health. This new law applies to all employers with 25 or more employees under the Oregon Family Leave Act (OFLA). Unlike most other states' programs for parental leave, Oregon includes protection for paid paternity leave as well as maternity leave in the new policy.

The presence of strong labor unions and Democratic control of state houses increases the likelihood that state legislatures support parental leave legislation.

=== Other federal policies ===
The Department of Defense has regulated the amount of maternity leave a military member can take. Before February 5, 2016, the leave was six weeks long for active duty members or reservists who had previously done twelve months of active duty time. On January 28, 2016, Defense Secretary Ashton Carter increased the paid maternity leave to twelve weeks for all branches. Traditional reservists, however, are given an eighty-four-day excusal, not leave.

In the United States Air Force AFI36-3003, it is stated that the maternity leave starts after being released from the hospital from giving birth, as also defined for other branches. "Shared benefits" can be created if both parents are active Air Force members. Therefore, a sum of up to twelve weeks can be taken by one parent or distributed amongst the two parents. However, two married active-duty members cannot create "shared benefits" in the Army, according to the Army Directive 2016-09 (Maternity Leave Policy).

There was a stance by the previous secretary of the navy, Ray Mabus, to increase the maternity leave from six to eighteen weeks for the Navy and Marine Corps beginning on July 2, 2015. It was implemented until January 28, 2016, however, it remained eighteen weeks for those who were pregnant previous to and on March 3, 2016.

It was a significant leap to go from six to twelve weeks of maternity leave. Other benefits have also been increased to improve the lives of those with newborn or newly adopted children. These benefits include an increase of child care hours to fourteen hours a day, and allowing active duty members more ability to family plan by paying for the sperm and egg freezing. These decisions were made by the previous Defense Secretary "in an effort to support military families, improve retention and strengthen the force of the future."

On December 20, 2019, as part of the National Defense Authorization Act (NDAA) for Fiscal Year 2020, the Federal Employee Paid Leave Act (FEPLA) amended the Family and Medical Leave Act (FMLA) to grant federal government employees up to 12 weeks of paid time off for the birth, adoption or fostering of a new child. The law applies to births or placements occurring on or after October 1, 2020.

=== Proposed legislation ===
Since the start of President Joe Biden's presidency, the issue of parental leave and improving benefits for parents and children has been a topic of interest for proposals of new legislation and was most recently readdressed in his extensive budget plan for government spending in 2024. One theme for President Biden's budget plan is centered around parents and children in the United States, in which Biden proposed a federally mandated, paid 12-week leave program for employees protected under the current Family and Medical Leave Act, as well as penalty-free paid sick days off. In this $6.8 trillion budget package, $325 billion would be set aside to fund this paid time off in replacement of parents taking unpaid leave. This is in addition to other key plans for improving parents' ability to support their children through universal preschool and making other childcare centers such as daycare less expensive, addressing issues debated around childcare affordability in the United States with rising costs placing a financial impact on working parents.

President Biden's heavy budget proposal for the fiscal year of 2024 has sparked uncertainty, however, about the ability to be passed through the government's split Congress and approval from the Republican House. Even before President Biden officially released his laid-out budget, Republican members of Congress were expected to be quick to reject this plan. This is in regards to dealing with the government's debt and raising the U.S. debt-ceiling; Biden's budget would increase taxes by 25% for the wealthy and large companies in order to support these programs without federal borrowing, which Biden believes will boost the economy by improving social programs without delving into the government's spending pocket, while the Republican party believes that the government must instead entirely limit spending without taxation to deal with the debt.

This is not the first time President Biden or Congress has proposed creating a mandated paid leave program, as there have been many trials and tribulations to get proposed bills off the ground. President Biden reflected similar program goals from his 2024 fiscal budget plan in his 2021 Build Back Better Plan. In President Biden's Build Back Better Plan, around $200 billion would be put into a paid leave program to allow for paid familial and sick leave for up to 4 weeks, which is revised from the original goal of the bill to have up to 12 weeks of paid leave. Nancy Pelosi and fellow Democratic Congress members were key to keeping the bill alive to pass through the House by cutting down the leave time, but drawbacks from the Senate, especially from Senator Joe Manchin, ultimately lead to hesitancies about winning the Senate vote and further discussion about a paid leave program from the Build Back Better plan had ceased.

Prior to this, Congress members have also proposed paid leave programs such as the Family and Medical Insurance Leave Act throughout the years. This program would provide employees with a 12-week paid leave, in which they would receive up to 66% of their paycheck. Contrasting with President Biden's proposals for paid leave that would fund the program through tax collections, the FAMILY Act would reflect the Social Security model and deduct $2 per week from earnings. Further progress for the passing of the FAMILY Act has been unfulfilled.

== Impacts ==
=== Health ===
==== Child health and development ====
Longer maternity leave (up to 25 weeks) is associated with a reduction in post-neonatal and child mortality. A 2017 study found that there was almost a 50% reduction in the probability of infant rehospitalization when women took maternity leave that was partially and fully paid. According to data from the 2006–2010 U.S. National Survey of Family Growth, paid maternity leave of 3 or more months for employed mothers is associated with a higher chance of the mother starting breastfeeding and breastfeeding her child at six months. The American Academy of Pediatrics (AAP) recommends exclusively six months of breastfeeding and continued breastfeeding as foods are introduced for one year for its medical and neurodevelopmental benefits for the child. Mothers who are not engaged in employment may be better equipped to participate in consistent breastfeeding since maternal employment can interfere with breastfeeding. Consequently, parents with a secured salary are more likely to spend the extra time that they would have spent working supervising their infant, monitoring their sleep, and taking them to preventative well-child visits. One study on the effect of California's 2004 PFLA found a 12% decrease in post-neonatal mortality rates after 2004, supporting the results that paid family leave has a visibly positive impact on families.

The Center for Disease Control and Prevention (CDC) states asthma, obesity, sudden infant death syndrome (SIDS), type 2 diabetes, gastrointestinal infections, and certain infections are all less likely to occur in breastfed babies. On that same note, research suggests that breastfeeding has the ability to yield substantial child health improvements in disease prevention and immune system build-up. Examples include, but are not limited to, decreased gastrointestinal disease, chronic digestive disease, and lower respiratory infections. Moreover, further evidence indicates that maternal care is especially crucial during the first couple of months following childbirth, or the time in which American maternity leave is in effect. Finally, evidence shows that paid maternity leave plans can increase paternal involvement in child care, as shown by California's state paid maternity leave program.

==== Parental health ====
The medical definition of postpartum is the time frame between childbirth and the return of the gestational parent's reproductive organs to their non-pregnant state. For people who return to work during this postpartum period, the stress of maintaining a balance between their professional and parenting responsibilities has been shown to weaken their immune systems and interact poorly with their psychological state. Lower rates of breastfeeding may also have negative effects on the parent's health, as breastfeeding lowers the possibility of breast cancer, ovarian cancer, type 2 diabetes, and heart disease for the parent. People of color and people classified as having high economic hardship report postpartum symptoms more frequently and for a longer duration than people not in these categories. This trend is observed with both physical and mental health symptoms.

Parental leave over a longer time period is associated with an increase in the health of both the mother and the child. Furthermore, paid leave with a duration of over 12 weeks is correlated with a decrease in the risk of infant and parental re-hospitalization. According to a study on cisgender mothers of 6-month old infants using data from the National Institute of Child Health and Human Development, mothers who worked more hours experienced higher levels of depressive symptoms and stress due to parenting. They also viewed their personal health as worse when they worked more hours in the period after childbirth. Parental l-infant separation may cause significant parental stress, depression, and anxiety. Researchers propose that paid leave relates to health as it allows women to recover from childbirth and take care of themselves, attend to their infants, visit the hospital for prenatal checkups, wellness, and illness, and manage finances.

==== Postpartum depression ====
Among other factors, pregnancy can be a cause of depression in women. Postpartum depression usually develops within 4–6 weeks after birth; however, delayed postpartum depression can also take up to 18 months to manifest for some women. Symptoms of postpartum depression include a loss of interest in activities, difficulty focusing, thinking, making decisions, and remembering things, anxiety, irritation, slowed speaking, physical pains, and feelings of sadness and worthlessness. In industrial societies, postpartum depression is considered a major public health concern and affects about 15% of women. Postpartum depression also has negative developmental consequences for the child. Research indicates 12 weeks may not be a long enough leave duration for those at risk of developing postpartum depression. As stated earlier, it can take up to 18 months to develop postpartum depression, and it affects each individual differently; the limited time frame maternity leave offers isn't substantial enough to address its potential health issues. Fewer occurrences of depressive symptoms are correlated to longer maternity leave.

A study using data from the Early Childhood Longitudinal Study - Birth Cohort indicates there is a lower likelihood of women developing severe depression and increased overall health if women take longer maternity leave from work. In addition, more depressive symptoms occurred in mothers postpartum when the spouse did not take any paternal leave. Poor physical health of the mother during the postpartum period is associated with more depressive symptoms, making postnatal health, in addition to employment, a prevalent factor when considering mental health in new mothers. Negative physical health symptoms frequently reported included tiredness, back pain, and back problems. Furthermore, postpartum death is a prevalent issue, as half of pregnancy-related deaths take place after women give birth.

The postpartum period can be characterized by high levels of stress for first-time parents of any gender as they transition into parenthood. Stressors include new financial responsibility, career changes, and the accountability of raising a child. These stressors trigger negative mental health effects with a risk of serious mental health diagnoses in either parent such as anxiety and/or depression. Specifically, in fathers on a global scale, up to 10% are diagnosed during this period with mental health disorders. Fortunately, these negative mental health effects are aided with access to parental leave. Longer leave is associated with a decrease in stressors, burnout risk, and utilization of mental health care.

These mental health issues have the biggest toll on women from low-income and marginalized communities. There is a sub-facet within the American Rescue Plan Act of 2021 that extends Medicaid care for postpartum-related issues. This policy reveals how important it is for mothers and their infants to have access to care for maternal mental health. However, it is a separate policy from the FMLA, and women will not have extended parental leave to focus on their mental health concerns. FMLA provides 12 weeks of unpaid leave, which only further negatively impacts women with low socioeconomic status seeking mental health care.

=== Economic ===
==== Economic efficiency ====
Five states currently offer paid family leave: California, Massachusetts, Georgia, New Jersey, and Rhode Island. In New Jersey, women who took paid leave in the year after giving birth were 40% less likely to receive public aid or food stamps. According to a California-based study, 87% of employers reported that the paid leave requirement did not increase costs; 9% noted that it saved money due to decreased turnover and other costs.

In the United States, $40 million is spent annually on the re-hospitalization of preterm infants. In addition, each maternal re-hospitalization adds an extra $1,600-3,000 to the cost of childbirth. Paid maternity leave is associated with increased maternal and neonatal health, so offering paid leave could decrease these costs.

Though the overall labor force participation has declined since the year 2000, some economists argue that paid maternity leave in California has increased labor force participation among mothers. Mothers who receive paid maternity leave may be more likely to return to employment later, then work more hours and earn higher wages. There is some evidence that the state paid maternity leave program in California saves businesses from needing to provide their own leave plans and financially stabilizes workers.

A 2024 study on California's paid family leave system (PFL) indicates increased labor participation of women who gave birth in the past twelve months by 5%. The study found a statistically significant positive impact of PFL on female labor participation rates for women up to nine years post-birth and eleven years post-birth for women with a four-year degree.

However, the same study found that the increase in female labor participation rates came from predominantly white non-Hispanic women. While PFL did create small statistically significant benefits for Hispanic and Asian Americans, PFL had almost no statistically significant impact on Black American women, as this group had high rates of employment before and after birth before the PFL program.

Concerns for Businesses

Less favorable maternity leave policies may inhibit a woman's career trajectory and promotion prospects. The extended period of absence of such policies often reduces a woman's economic status and opportunities. During this hiatus, her job skills and experiences may deteriorate, consequently limiting their potential advancement.

Business owners have historically opposed paid family leave due to concerns over increased costs when people take leave. However, a study on California's PFL system shows that the program did not increase costs for over 86% of businesses. In fact, 8.8% of businesses in California reported saving money due to employee attrition rates decreasing and using the program to cut the costs of their own benefit programs. A nation-wide poll conducted in 2017 found that 70% of small business owners approved of a PFL system where individual workers and businesses make contributions. Further, 47% of the small business owners indicated they would support legislation for PFL. Another study suggests that PFL programs do not hurt employers with more than 50 employees, and the mandated policies may potentially help businesses deal better with longer-term absences.

==== Motherhood penalty ====
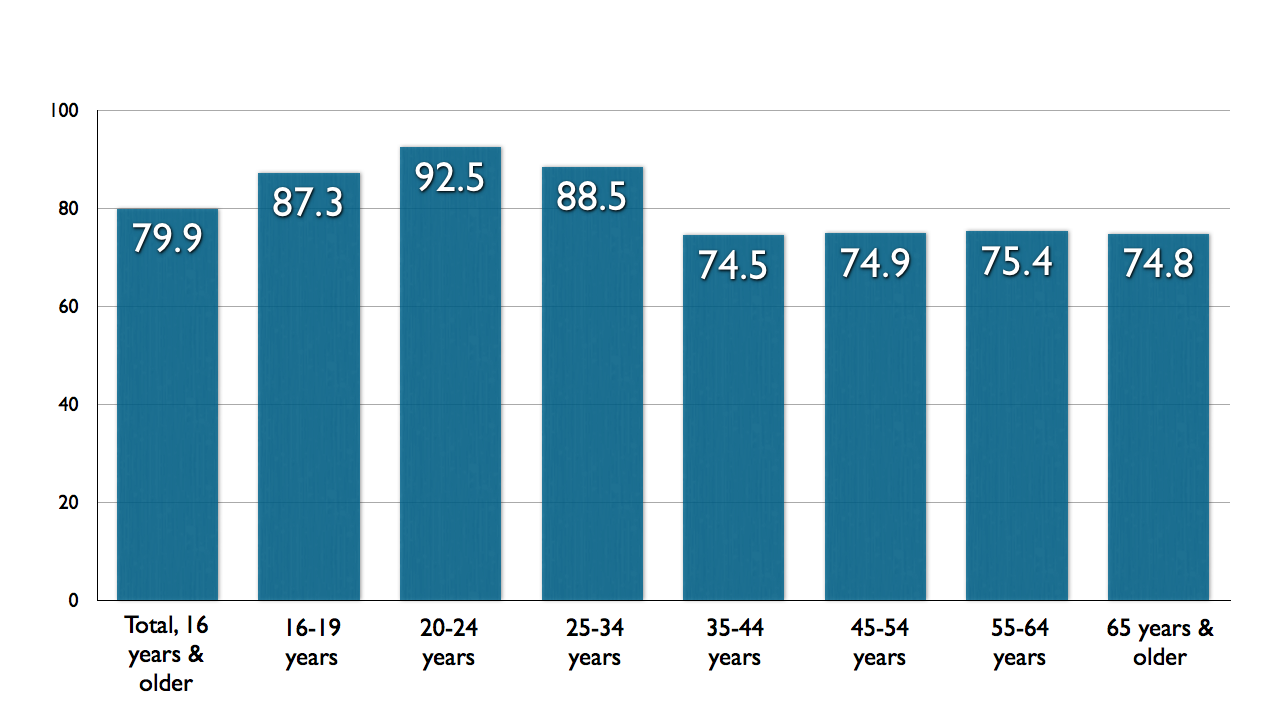
US - women's earnings as a percentage of men's in 2008 by age group

Available maternity leave options may help lower the impact of caring for children on career advancement and/or the motherhood penalty. There currently exists a "family gap" between the pay of mothers and nonmothers. In the United States prior, to the passage of the FMLA, mothers typically earned 70% of men's wages while nonmothers earned 90%. These earning disparities partially stemmed from insecure employment return prospects. Women without maternity leave protection were often forced to start over with a new employer following their absence. This interrupted their career progression and burdened them with the additional task of seeking new employment. Such factors ultimately impede equitable access to income and career opportunities.

According to a systematic review of paternity leave from 2014, mothers are more inclined to prioritize the work-family equilibrium, putting their careers in a threatened position due to the risk of lowered income and fewer promotional and/or managerial role opportunities. Women as a group notably experience increasing income inequality as they age illustrating the impact of motherhood on their wage prospects. However, the implementation of FMLA addressed some of these impediments through the introduction of mandatory maternity leave. Mothers now are more likely to return to their previous employer due to this increased legal protection. The policy minimizes some of the negative externalities of motherhood by maintaining women's employment options even following maternity leave. Yet, many policy experts suspect that the remaining gender imbalance is largely attributable to the dearth of paid leave options. Women who worked for companies that provided paid maternity leave before they gave birth are more likely to take such leave for up to 12 weeks, and more likely to return to work more quickly thereafter.

=== Social ===
==== Access equality ====
Under the current FMLA system, approximately 40% of United States workers are ineligible for benefits due to the brevity of their tenure or the smallness of their firm. These excluded populations are often low-waged and minority women thus furthering their already present disadvantage. In 2016, 38% of white working mothers qualified for and could afford to take unpaid leave under FMLA compared with 30% of African American women and 25% of Hispanic women. Moreover, the unpaid aspect of the current policy limits access to those who are economically well off. The United States Department of Labor reported that over a 22-month period in 1999 and 2000, 3.5 million people needed leave but were unable to take it due to affordability concerns. In the private sector, it was found that 12% of workers received paid paternity leave with 23% of workers in the highest-wage quartile receiving paid maternity leave versus 5% of workers in the lowest-wage quartile. The lack of monetary compensation may hinder the ability of women who are not as financially secure as others to balance employment with their family life. Upper-class women are more likely to take unpaid leave than lower-class women. In addition, more white women take unpaid maternity leave than black or Hispanic women. This imbalance contributes to the discrepancies in infant mortality between groups.

Moreover, access to paid parental leave is selective based on where the parent is employed and how long they have been employed before the child is born. This is an evident disparity for those employed in lower quality positions because of poor health and minimal opportunities. Paid family leave may be considered a luxury as evidenced by only 23% of civilian workers in the United States with access to it, and even lower rates of paid leave for fathers. This is important to consider when analyzing research on the effects of paid parental leave because not all families in the United States are eligible for payment, thus, the results are skewed to characterize high income families with better access. For example, Studies show that the current laws disproportionately impact minorities and low-income women, who are less likely to take unpaid leave.

In March 2023, 27 percent of civilian workers had access to paid family leave and 90 percent had access to unpaid family leave. Access to paid family leave varied by occupation, from 39 percent among management, professional, and related workers to 16 percent among service workers.

==== Access to parental leave for LGBTQ people ====
The wording of parental leave policies may lead to lack of access for LGBTQ parents when there is a lack of gender neutral language and when the language in the policies emphasizes leave as available only for birth parents. Policies and researchers exploring parental leave policy may assume birth parents are female and non-birthing parents are male, which may exclude transgender and non-binary parents and lead to them being denied access to leave by not being written into the policy contracts themselves. This kind of language can exclude adoptive parents, non-biological mothers, and gay fathers. A report looking at the parental leave policies of the 44 largest companies in the US found that only a minority offered policies that were inclusive of LGBTQ families. LGBTQ parents are also more likely to foster or adopt, two processes that often require longer time periods of parent-child bonding and can have uncertain timelines of care. These parents, more than heterosexual ones, are affected and denied important connection periods when there is a lack of inclusive parental leave policy. The decision for paid parental leave is left for approval from the organization, which may leave LGBTQ adoptive parents with limited or no formal leave. It is not common for there to be adoption benefits in comparison with traditional birth leave. Paid parental leave may be more accessible by biological lesbian parents than by non-biological lesbian parents.

Access to paid parental leave for LGBTQ people of color

From a more intersectional lens, lack of access to parental leave also harms LGBTQ parents who are also people of color. LGBTQ people of color face additional barriers to requesting leave, as a combination of anti-LGBTQ and racially motivated employment discrimination might lead them to feel less comfortable in requesting paid leave. According to a report by the Human Rights Foundation released in 2018, which included responses from 1,883 LGBTQ people who also identified as people of color, nearly 30 percent of respondents noted they were uncomfortable requesting paid leave, compared to 16 percent of white LGBTQ people. Additionally, only 40 percent of the survey respondents also reported that their company offers them paid parental leave. As LGBTQ parents of color are more likely to be in a lower socioeconomic status than white LGBTQ parents, the lack of paid parental leave policies disproportionately impacts LGBTQ parents of color, who often cannot afford unpaid leave.

Access to paid parental leave for transgender parents

Transgender and non-binary parents face hurdles to paid parental leave due to the lack of gender-neutral language in their companies' paid leave policies. According to the Human Rights Campaign Foundation's 2018 Report on the Experiences of Transgender and Non-binary Respondents, which surveyed 1,121 transgender and non-binary people in the United States, less than 40 percent of respondents say that their companies have inclusive paid family leave policies. Respondents also mentioned having less access to sick leave in substitution for paid parental leave. Similar to LGBTQ people of color, non-cisgender parents are usually more likely to live in poverty and struggle more with taking unpaid leave in order to support their families after childbirth or adoption of a new child.

== Paternity leave ==
California was the first state to offer paid paternity leave (six weeks, partial payment), and New Jersey, Rhode Island, and New York have since passed laws for paid family leave. In the rest of the US, paternity pay weeks are not offered (therefore neither paternity paid leave weeks), but fathers have access to unpaid paternity leave to care for their newborns (without new income). Often, fathers will take sick days or vacation time when they have newborns. There is also a growing number of fathers that go unpaid. Some employers are required by law to allow 12 weeks of unpaid family leave after the birth or adoption of a child. This law is under FMLA or Family Medical Leave Act. Fathers who have access to paid paternity leave allow mothers to engage in paid work, with a positive effect on female labor force participation and wages. In 2015, a larger proportion of working fathers than mothers who requested leave received paid leave.

The United States military branches also show minimal paternity leave. Although some branches give more time after the birth to take the leave, all branches give ten days. This type of leave applies to those who are married.

Research shows that longer paternity leave increases the father's engagement with a child, which leads to the child's improved cognitive and mental health outcomes and fewer behavior problems. Studies have also found beneficial associations between paid paternal leave and mental health for first-time parents.

Paternity leave has also led to an increase in breastfeeding on behalf of the mother. Research has shown that when fathers take paternity leave, the likelihood of mothers continuing to breastfeed increases. This is in relation to fathers providing help with everyday household chores while also providing direct support to the mother, reducing her stress levels and making breastfeeding easier. In return, the health benefits of the child also increase due to the advantages of breastfeeding.

== COVID-19 impacts ==
The COVID-19 pandemic greatly impacted families all across the United States and the world. A survey from S&P Global and AARP conveyed how families engaged in taking care of their children from home for more hours than they were accustomed to since the onset of the pandemic. The Families First Coronavirus Response Act (FFCRA) was implemented in order to allow parents or guardians to afford to look after their children due to COVID-19 related issues. This act allows employees up to 80 hours of paid sick leave or 10 weeks of paid family and medical leave in order for parents to care for their children. This act does not affect the FMLA, which stipulates the 12 weeks of unpaid parental leave, as stated above. Family and home-life structures looked different due to the pandemic, and policies were needed to reflect this change in society.

== Criticism ==
The United States is the only industrialized nation that does not offer paid parental leave. Of the countries in the United Nations, only the United States, Suriname, Papua New Guinea, and a few Pacific island countries do not provide paid time off for new parents, either through the employer's benefits or government-paid maternity and parental benefits. A study of 168 countries found that 163 guarantee paid leave to women, and 45 guarantee paid paternity leave.

The United States maternity leave policy is distinct for its relative scarcity of benefits in comparison to other industrialized countries. Thus, the legislation imposes relatively few restrictions on American firms and instead underscores employer discretion in the shaping of maternity leave policy. These firms are thus free to offer maternity leave policies on terms that are more aligned with corporate interests. This United States policy differs greatly from most other Western countries in terms of maternity leave provision. These stark maternity leave differentials are demonstrated in both the policy's length and compensation. The United States does not comply with international minimum standards. The Maternity Protection Convention, 2000, requires at least 14 weeks of maternity leave. In the European Union, the Pregnant Workers Directive requires at least 14 weeks of maternity leave, while the Work–Life Balance Directive requires at least 10 days of paternity leave, as well as at least 4 months of parental leave, with 2 months being non-transferable.

Similar to other nations, childcare in the United States is not always equally shared between mothers and fathers. In the United States, fathers can have some paid leaves if they live in California or other states with similar legislation (partial paid leave). In contrast, Slovenian fathers have 12 weeks of 100% paid paternity leave. In Sweden, 480 days of 80% paid paternity leave weeks. In Norway, 49 weeks of 100% paid paternity leave or 59 weeks of 80% paid paternity leave. Finnish fathers have 11 partially paid leave weeks.

While no existing laws explicitly prohibit LGBTQ+ people from taking parental leave in the United States, critics have noted that the Family Medical Leave Act (FMLA) doesn't provide adequate substantial financial support to LGBTQ+ parents. However, the U.S. Department of Labor has explicitly advised employers to grant workers in loco parentis child-related FMLA leave. This allows non-biological LGBTQ+ parents to have legal parental rights to a child. Many LGBTQ+ family advocates have demonstrated how the act excludes many low-income workers. Those looking to take federal family leave are only eligible if they have been in the service of their employer for 12 months. For low-income LGBTQ+ families, taking 12 weeks of unpaid leave creates a massive financial burden. LGBTQ+ parents and social justice activists have advocated for stronger federal, state, and local policy on paid parental leave as a result of the existing complications with FMLA.

== See also ==
- Maternity
- United States labor law
- Work–life interface
- Working mothers
