= AT&T Corp. v. Hulteen =

AT&T Corporation v. Hulteen
- Supreme Court of the United States

Argued December 10, 2008 Decided May 18, 2009
- Full case name: AT&T Corporation, Petitioner v. Noreen Hulteen, et al.
- Docket no.: 07-543
- Citations: 556 U.S. 701 (more) 129 S. Ct. 1962; 173 L. Ed. 2d 898

Case history
- Prior: CV-01-01122-MJJ (N.D. Cal.); reversed, 441 F.3d 653 (9th Cir. 2006); affirmed on rehearing en banc, 498 F.3d 1001 (9th Cir. 2007); cert. granted, 554 U.S. 916 (2008).

Holding
- Maternity leave taken before the passage of the 1978 Pregnancy Discrimination Act cannot be considered in calculating employee pension benefits.

Court membership
- Chief Justice John Roberts Associate Justices John P. Stevens · Antonin Scalia; Anthony Kennedy · David Souter; Clarence Thomas · Ruth Bader Ginsburg; Stephen Breyer · Samuel Alito

Case opinions
- Majority: Souter, joined by Roberts, Stevens, Scalia, Kennedy, Thomas, Alito
- Concurrence: Stevens
- Dissent: Ginsburg, joined by Breyer

AT&T Corporation v. Hulteen, 556 U.S. 701 (2009), is a US labor law case of the United States Supreme Court, holding that maternity leave taken before the passage of the 1978 Pregnancy Discrimination Act needed not to be considered in calculating employee pension benefits.

== Facts ==
The case entered the Supreme Court's docket in October 2007 and concerned whether maternity leave taken before the passage of the 1978 Pregnancy Discrimination Act can be considered in calculating employee pension benefits. The Supreme Court agreed to hear the case in June 2008. The case concerns Noreen Hulteen who took maternity leave in 1968. Due to complications resulting from giving birth she was hospitalized and required surgery. She missed a total of 240 days of work due to her pregnancy and surgery, but her employer, AT&T Corporation, only gave her 30 days of paid leave. Under company policy at the time, in contrast, employees who took disability leave were entitled to be paid as long as they were disabled. Before the passage of the Pregnancy Discrimination Act of 1978, it was lawful to award less service credit for pregnancy leave and exclude conditions related to pregnancy from employee sickness and accident benefits plans. The Supreme Court had previously upheld this in the cases of General Electric Company v. Gilbert (1976) and Geduldig v. Aiello (1974).

As a result of the policy, when Hulteen retired in 1994 from AT&T, AT&T calculated her pension benefits by excluding 210 days that it would have credited if she had been granted leave because of any disability other than pregnancy.

Shortly after her retirement, the Communications Workers of America (CWA), the union for the majority of AT&T's nonmanagement employees, filed charges of discrimination with the Equal Employment Opportunity Commission (EEOC), alleging discrimination on the basis of sex and pregnancy in violation of Title VII. In 1998 the Equal Employment Opportunity Commission (EEOC), agreed with the CWA, alleging discrimination on the basis of sex and pregnancy in violation of Title VII and issued a Letter of Determination finding reasonable cause to believe that AT&T had discriminated Hulteen and several other women. In 2001, Hulteen and several other women sued AT&T, stating its decision to pay them smaller pensions because of their pregnancy disability leaves constituted an unlawful employment practice under the 1978 Pregnancy Discrimination Act, an amendment to Title VII of the Civil Rights Act of 1964, which prohibits discrimination on the basis of pregnancy and allows those on maternity leave the same coverage as other medical leave. Lawyers for the women argued that each reduced retirement check that they receive is "a fresh act of discrimination" a reference to the first bill signed into law by President Barack Obama the Lilly Ledbetter law.

AT&T's argument was that the 1978 law cannot be applied retroactively because congress did not make the law retroactive and that they were basing the pension calculations on conditions at the time of employment.

The United States Court of Appeals for the Ninth Circuit in hearing the case ruled in favor of Hulteen. This decision directly conflicted with previous decisions of the Sixth and Seventh Circuits, helping to lead to the Supreme Courts decision to review the case. Oral arguments were heard on December 10, 2008.

== Judgment ==
The Supreme Court ruled in a 7–2 decision on May 18, 2009, that maternity leave taken before the passage of the 1978 Pregnancy Discrimination Act could be excluded in calculating employee pension benefits, even though leave taken for non-pregnancy related medical disabilities was not excluded. As a result of the Court's opinion AT&T was not required to amend its discriminatory pension policy retroactive to the effective date of the Pregnancy Discrimination Act.

Justice Souter, in the majority opinion, wrote the following.

Although adopting a service credit rule unfavorable to those out on pregnancy leave would violate Title VII today, a seniority system does not necessarily violate the statute when it gives current effect to such rules that operated before the PDA. Benefit differentials produced by a bona fide seniority-based pension plan are permitted unless they are "the result of an intention to discriminate."

Justice Ginsburg dissented and said the following.

PDA does not require redress for past discrimination. It does not oblige employers to make women whole for the compensation denied them when, prior to the Act, they were placed on pregnancy leave, often while still ready, willing, and able to work, and with no secure right to return to their jobs after childbirth. But the PDA does protect women, from and after April 1979, when the Act became fully effective, against repetition or continuation of pregnancy-based disadvantageous treatment....I would hold that AT&T committed a current violation of Title VII when, post-PDA, it did not totally discontinue reliance upon a pension calculation premised on the notion that pregnancy-based classifications display no gender bias.

== Significance ==
Critics of the decision like Christine L. Owens of the National Employment Law Project stated that "The court's decision could affect thousands of women who took pregnancy leaves decades ago and now are headed toward retirement; the only way women who took pregnancy leave before 1979 can make their leave time count is through the good graces of their company or through legislation by Congress."

Proponents of the decision like Rae T. Vann of Equal Employment Advisory Council stated that the decision was a "sensible and straightforward ruling" and "Congress intended the Pregnancy Discrimination Act to be applied prospectively, not retroactively."

== See also ==
- US labor law
- Pregnancy discrimination
