= California Fair Employment and Housing Act of 1959 =

California statute to fight sexual harassment and discrimination

The California Fair Employment and Housing Act of 1959, codified as Government Code §§12900 - 12996, is a California statute used to fight sexual harassment and other forms of unlawful discrimination in employment and housing, which was passed on September 18, 1959.

== Scope ==
The FEHA is the principal California statute prohibiting employment discrimination covering employers, labor organizations, employment agencies, apprenticeship programs and any person or entity who aids, abets, incites, compels, or coerces the doing of a discriminatory act. It prohibits employment discrimination based on race or color; religion; national origin or ancestry, physical disability; mental disability or medical condition; marital status; sex or sexual orientation; age, with respect to persons over the age of 40; and pregnancy, childbirth, or related medical conditions. The FEHA also prohibits retaliation against anyone for opposing any practice forbidden by the Act or for filing a complaint, testifying, or assisting in proceedings under the FEHA.

An amendment passed in 1978 requires employers to provide an unpaid job-protected leave to employees disabled by pregnancy (also known as "pregnancy disability leave") for up to four months. The legality of this statute and its consistency with federal law was upheld by the Supreme Court in California Federal Savings & Loan Ass'n v. Guerra (1987). After the passage of the federal Pregnancy Discrimination Act of 1978, pregnant employees in California also became eligible to receive temporary disability insurance benefits under the California State Disability Insurance program.

== Purpose ==
Various individual states within the United States have anti-discrimination laws which sometimes differ from federal law; these laws are provided in addition to the federal law, and may offer more desirable avenues to victims of harassment and discrimination.

The FEHA was adopted with the stated purpose of providing effective remedies to eliminate certain types of employment discrimination.

The FEHA offers protections that are similar and often more potent that those available under federal counterparts, like Title VII and the Americans with Disabilities Act of 1990. These protections include, but are not limited to, attorney fee awards and reimbursement of certain case related expenses to prevailing plaintiffs. Additionally, the FEHA sometimes applies different and less stringent standards for meeting the criteria related to harassment, discrimination, and retaliation.

== Examples ==
California law and the FEHA also allow for the imposition of punitive damages when a corporate defendant's officers, directors or managing agents engage in harassment, discrimination, or retaliation, or when such persons approve or consciously disregard prohibited conduct by lower-level employees in violation of the rights or safety of the plaintiff or others.

The California Court of Appeals opinion in the landmark sexual harassment case of Weeks. v. Baker & McKenzie is a good example of how the FEHA works to protect employees in California. Settlements in FEHA cases can actually be quite complex and require complex negotiations.

== Process ==
Whether seeking an investigation under FEHA or a suit in court, the process usually begins with the victim filing a complaint of discrimination with the California Department of Fair Employment and Housing.
