= CFRA (disambiguation) =

CFRA may refer to:

- CFRA, a radio station in Ottawa, Canada
- CKKL-FM, formerly CFRA-FM, a radio station in Ottawa
- California Family Rights Act, job protection related to California's Paid Family Leave
- Chief Fire and Rescue Adviser, now Her Majesty's Chief Inspector of Fire Services
- College Football Researchers Association
