= Stress leave =

Stress leave is a form of leave of absence (LOA) taken as a form of stress management due to excess psychological stress negatively impacting an employee's performance.

== United States ==
In the United States, unpaid stress leave may be taken under Family and Medical Leave Act of 1993 (FMLA) for up to 12 weeks annually.

=== California ===
In California, paid stress leave may be taken under the California Family Rights Act (CFRA) if it stems from the job.
