= California Federal Savings & Loan Ass'n v. Guerra =

- Supreme Court of the United States

Argued October 8, 1986 Decided January 13, 1987
- Full case name: California Federal Savings & Loan Association et al. v. Guerra, Director, Department of Fair Employment and Housing, et al.
- Citations: 479 U.S. 272 (more) 107 S. Ct. 683; 93 L. Ed. 2d 613

Case history
- Prior: 758 F.2d 390 (9th Cir. 1985)

Holding
- § 12945(b)(2) is not preempted by Title VII, as amended by the Pregnancy Discrimination Act, because it is not inconsistent with the purposes of Title VII, nor does it require the doing of an act that is unlawful under Title VII.

Court membership
- Chief Justice William Rehnquist Associate Justices William J. Brennan Jr. · Byron White; Thurgood Marshall · Harry Blackmun; Lewis F. Powell Jr. · John P. Stevens; Sandra Day O'Connor · Antonin Scalia

Case opinions
- Majority: Marshall, joined by Brennan, Blackmun, Stevens, O'Connor (Parts I, II, III-B, III-C, IV)
- Concurrence: Stevens
- Concurrence: Scalia
- Dissent: White, joined by Rehnquist, Powell

Laws applied
- Cal. Gov't Code § 12945(b)(2), Title VII of Civil Rights Act of 1964, Pregnancy Discrimination Act of 1978

California Federal Savings & Loan Ass'n v. Guerra, 479 U.S. 272 (1987), is a US labor law case of the United States Supreme Court about whether a state may require employers to provide greater pregnancy benefits than required by federal law, as well as the ability to require pregnancy benefits to women without similar benefits to men. The court held that The California Fair Employment and Housing Act §12945(b)(2), which requires employers to provide leave and reinstatement to employees disabled by pregnancy, is consistent with federal law.

== Facts ==
An amendment to the California Fair Employment and Housing Act §12945(b)(2) passed in 1978 required that employers must grant a job-protected reasonable leave of absence for employees disabled by pregnancy. Lillian Garland had worked for California Federal Savings and Loan for about 4 years before needing to take time out to have her baby. She ultimately trained the woman to take her place during her time off as indicated by her doctor and upon her return, was to be told that the person that she had trained was given the job. She filed suit alleging violations of the Pregnancy Discrimination Act of 1978, which prohibited discrimination on the basis of pregnancy in employment. Cal Fed argued that the California statute requiring employers to grant leave for pregnant employees constituted discrimination under the Pregnancy Discrimination Act.

== Judgment ==
Justice Thurgood Marshall, writing for the majority, held that the California statute was not preempted. Brennan, Blackmun, Stevens, O'Connor concurred. Marshall said the following.

In determining whether a state statute is pre-empted by federal law and therefore invalid under the Supremacy Clause of the Constitution, our sole task is to ascertain the intent of Congress. See Shaw v. Delta Air Lines, Inc., 463 U.S. 85, 95, 103 S.Ct. 2890, 2898, 77 L.Ed.2d 490 (1983); Malone v. White Motor Corp., 435 U.S. 497, 504, 98 S.Ct. 1185, 1189, 55 L.Ed.2d 443 (1978). Federal law may supersede state law in several different ways. First, when acting within constitutional limits, Congress is empowered to pre-empt state law by so stating in express terms. E.g., Jones v. Rath Packing Co., 430 U.S. 519, 525, 97 S.Ct. 1305, 1309, 51 L.Ed.2d 604 (1977). Second, congressional intent to pre-empt state law in a particular area may be inferred where the scheme of federal regulation is sufficiently comprehensive to make reasonable the inference that Congress "left no room" for supplementary state regulation. Rice v. Santa Fe Elevator Corp., 331 U.S. 218, 230, 67 S.Ct. 1146, 1152, 91 L.Ed. 1447 (1947). Neither of these bases for pre-emption exists in this case. Congress has explicitly disclaimed any intent categorically to pre-empt state law or to "occupy the field" of employment discrimination law. See 42 U.S.C. §§ 2000e-7 and 2000h-4.

As a third alternative, in those areas where Congress has not completely displaced state regulation, federal law may nonetheless pre-empt state law to the extent it actually conflicts with federal law. Such a conflict occurs either because "compliance with both federal and state regulations is a physical impossibility," Florida Lime & Avocado Growers, Inc. v. Paul, 373 U.S. 132, 142-143, 83 S.Ct. 1210, 1217, 10 L.Ed.2d 248 (1963), or because the state law stands "as an obstacle to the accomplishment and execution of the full purposes and objectives of Congress." Hines v. Davidowitz, 312 U.S. 52, 67, 61 S.Ct. 399, 404, 85 L.Ed. 581 (1941)....

This third basis for pre-emption is at issue in this case. In two sections of the 1964 Civil Rights Act, §§ 708 and 1104, Congress has indicated that state laws will be pre-empted only if they actually conflict with federal law. Section 708 of Title VII provides:

"Nothing in this title shall be deemed to exempt or relieve any person from any liability, duty, penalty, or punishment provided by any present or future law of any State or political subdivision of a State, other than any such law which purports to require or permit the doing of any act which would be an unlawful employment practice under this title." 78 Stat. 262, 42 U.S.C. § 2000e-7.

Section 1104 of Title XI, applicable to all titles of the Civil Rights Act, establishes the following standard for pre-emption:

"Nothing contained in any title of this Act shall be construed as indicating an intent on the part of Congress to occupy the field in which any such title operates to the exclusion of State laws on the same subject matter, nor shall any provision of this Act be construed as invalidating any provision of State law unless such provision is inconsistent with any of the purposes of this Act, or any provision thereof." 78 Stat. 268, 42 U.S.C. § 2000h-4.

Accordingly, there is no need to infer congressional intent to pre-empt state laws from the substantive provisions of Title VII; these two sections provide a "reliable indicium of congressional intent with respect to state authority" to regulate employment practice. Malone v. White Motor Corp., supra, 435 U.S. at 505, 98 S.Ct., at 1190.

Sections 708 and 1104 severely limit Title VII's pre-emptive effect. Instead of pre-empting state fair employment laws, § 708 " 'simply left them where they were before the enactment of title VII.' " Shaw v. Delta Air Lines, Inc., supra, 463 U.S., at 103, n. 24 103 S.Ct., at 2903, n. 24 (quoting Pervel Industries, Inc. v. Connecticut Comm'n on Human Rights and Opportunities, 468 F.Supp. 490, 493 (Conn.1978)

Justice Scalia wrote a separate concurrence. Justice White (joined by Rehnquist and Powell) dissented.

== See also ==
- US labor law
