= Geduldig v. Aiello =

1974 equal protection United States Supreme Court case

- Supreme Court of the United States

Argued March 26, 1974 Decided June 17, 1974
- Full case name: Geduldig v. Aiello et al.
- Citations: 417 U.S. 484 (more) 94 S.Ct 2485; 41 L. Ed. 256; 1974 U.S. LEXIS 23

Case history
- Prior: Judgment for plaintiffs, Aiello v. Hansen, 359 F. Supp. 792 (N.D. Cal. 1973); motion for reconsideration denied, 1973 WL 11541 (N.D. Cal., August 3, 1973); stay granted, Hansen v. Aiello, 414 U.S. 897 (1973); probable jurisdiction noted, Geduldig v. Aiello, 414 U.S. 1110 (1973).

Holding
- Denial of benefits for work loss resulting from normal pregnancy does not violate the Equal Protection Clause of the Fourteenth Amendment.

Court membership
- Chief Justice Warren E. Burger Associate Justices William O. Douglas · William J. Brennan Jr. Potter Stewart · Byron White; Thurgood Marshall · Harry Blackmun; Lewis F. Powell Jr. · William Rehnquist

Case opinions
- Majority: Stewart, joined by Burger, White, Blackmun, Powell, Rehnquist
- Dissent: Brennan, joined by Douglas, Marshall

Geduldig v. Aiello, 417 U.S. 484 (1974), is a United States Supreme Court decision holding that pregnancy discrimination is not sex-based discrimination, and therefore the denial of insurance benefits for work loss resulting from a normal pregnancy does not violate the Equal Protection Clause of the Fourteenth Amendment to the United States Constitution.

The California insurance program at issue did not exclude workers from eligibility based on sex, but excluded pregnancy from a list of compensable disabilities. The Geduldig majority found that, even though only women would be directly affected by the exclusion, the classification of normal pregnancy as non-compensable was not a sex-based classification and so the court would defer to the state so long as it could provide a rational basis for its categorization.

Geduldig and its follow-up case, General Electric Co. v. Gilbert (1976), were rejected by Congress and the public and were considered anomalous until Geduldig was cited by the Roberts Court in Dobbs v. Jackson Women's Health Organization (2022) and United States v. Skrmetti (2025).

== Facts ==
Starting in 1946, California ran an insurance system to cover private sector employees temporarily unemployed because of a disability not covered by workmen's compensation. It was funded by contributions deducted from the wages of participating employees, for whom participation was generally mandatory unless they belonged to an approved private insurance plan. Employees who had contributed 1% of a minimum income to the disability fund for one year prior to a period of disability were eligible to receive benefits. However, certain disabilities would not be covered, including those resulting from commitment for dipsomania, drug addiction, or sexual psychopathy. Also excluded were certain disabilities resulting from pregnancy, as found in §2626 of the Unemployment Insurance Code: “In no case shall the term ‘disability’ or ‘disabled’ include any injury or illness caused by or arising in connection with pregnancy up to the termination of such pregnancy and for a period of 28 days thereafter.”

Geduldig began as two separate class action lawsuits brought by employees who had paid into the state’s disability fund but been denied benefits relating to pregnancy-related disabilities. Three of the employees had suffered employment disability after complications that arose during their pregnancies, while the fourth had experienced a normal pregnancy which still led to a temporary inability to work. Carolyn Aiello brought suit in California federal district court, while Augustina Armendariz, Elizabeth Johnson, and Jacqueline Jaramillo brought suit as a petition for a writ of mandate in the Supreme Court of California. The separate cases were consolidated when the state suit was removed to federal court by appellant Dwight Geduldig, Director of the California Department of Human Resources Development.

Initially, the appellees sought to enjoin enforcement of the pregnancy-exclusionary policy, and a divided three-judge panel of the District Court granted their motion for summary judgment, holding that the program’s administration violated the Fourteenth Amendment's Equal Protection Clause and stating that "the exclusion of pregnancy-related disabilities is not based upon a classification having a rational and substantial relationship to a legitimate state purpose." The court denied a motion to stay its judgment pending appeal. Geduldig proceeded to file a similar motion with the Supreme Court, which noted probable jurisdiction over the appeal.

The issue regarding three of the appellees who had brought suit to recover benefits for loss of work after complications from pregnancy (tubal and ectopic pregnancies and a miscarriage) was moot by the time the case reached the Supreme Court due to a California state court decision in Rentzer v. California Unemployment Insurance Appeals Board interpreting the statute to apply only to benefit payments for disabilities resulting from normal pregnancies, allowing a woman who had suffered an ectopic pregnancy to recover benefits. As such, the only remaining controversy in Geduldig was whether appellee Jaramillo and others similarly situated were entitled to benefits for work loss related to normal and generally healthy pregnancy and childbirth.

== Supreme Court ==
The Supreme Court ruled 5–3 for Geduldig, holding that denial of benefits for work loss resulting from normal pregnancy did not violate the Equal Protection Clause of the Fourteenth Amendment. The majority therefore reversed the lower court's decision and vacated the stay previously granted.

=== Majority ===
Justice Potter Stewart wrote the majority opinion, joined by Chief Justice Warren E. Burger and Justices Byron White, Harry Blackmun, Lewis F. Powell Jr., and William Rehnquist. Part II began by laying out the claimed rational basis for the policy as argued by the state. Stewart focused largely on the economics of the benefit system, which had been operating as a self-supporting system since its inception. The contribution rate to the disability fund as set struck a balance that allowed the state to cover the health conditions that it had deemed eligible under the program: in the years immediately preceding Geduldig, 90–103% of the disability fund's revenue had been utilized to pay disability and hospital benefits. Both parties acknowledged that to cover more disability risks would require an increase in the amount of money going into the fund, although they disagreed on the amount this would entail. The district court had accepted the state's estimate that to cover normal pregnancy and delivery would require the fund to pay out over $100 million more in benefits but had found that this would not destroy the solvency of the program, although it would require "reasonable changes in the contribution rate, the maximum benefits allowable, and other variables." The state, however, argued that such changes would jeopardize the ability of low-income Californians to participate in the program, and thus it had a rational basis to maintain the system in its existing state.

Stewart pointed to Williamson v. Lee Optical Co. (1955), in which the Court found that a legislature could legitimately address problems in phases, prioritizing the issues which were most pressing. He stated that the court would be particularly hesitant to second-guess such prioritization and legislative calculation in regards to social welfare programs, citing the premise in the 1970 Supreme Court case Dandridge v. Williams that the Equal Protection Clause "does not require that a State must choose between attacking every aspect of a problem or not attacking the problem at all." California, he therefore held, could legitimately and constitutionally decide that it was better to "keep benefit payments at an adequate level for disabilities that are covered, rather than to cover all disabilities inadequately."

Finally, Stewart turned to the issue of whether California's claimed rational basis was sufficient to uphold the state's position. He found in the insurance system no invidious discrimination that would violate the Equal Protection Clause, noting that women as a group were still eligible for benefits even though the particular condition of pregnancy might not be covered. He argued that there was "no risk from which men are protected and women are not" and "no risk from which women are protected and men are not." He stated in a footnote that:

The program divides potential recipients into two groups—pregnant women and nonpregnant persons. While the first group is exclusively female, the second includes members of both sexes. The fiscal and actuarial benefits of the program thus accrue to members of both sexes.

While Stewart acknowledged that only women could undergo the excluded condition, he wrote that "it does not follow that every legislative classification concerning pregnancy is a sex-based classification." He argued that pregnancy was an objectively identifiable characteristic rather than a subjective judgment, and the appellants had made no showing that the state's asserted rationale for the policy was a pretext for invidious discrimination. He therefore chose not to subject California's policy to the heightened scrutiny that the court had used to evaluate previous sex-discrimination cases like Reed v. Reed (1971) and Frontiero v. Richardson (1973). As such, the claimed rational basis was enough to allow the policy to stand.

=== Dissent ===
Justice William J. Brennan Jr. dissented, joined by Justices William O. Douglas and Thurgood Marshall, arguing that intermediate scrutiny was the proper level of review for the issue under Reed and Frontiero, and that under this analysis California's classification failed on the basis that the appellants had only set out a rational basis for the state's policy. Brennan acknowledged that the fiscal solvency of California's insurance program was a legitimate concern and that to include temporary disabilities resulting from normal pregnancy in the scope of conditions covered by the system would require an increase in the employee contribution, an increase in the yearly contribution ceiling, or state subsidization. However, he stated that "whatever role such monetary considerations may play in traditional equal protection analysis, the State’s interest in preserving the fiscal integrity of its disability insurance program simply cannot render the State’s use of a suspect classification constitutional."

Brennan stated that pregnancy was one of the only common conditions affecting health that was not covered by the broad scope of California's Unemployment Insurance Code, even though the economic results of it could be functionally identical to those of other disabilities in that wages could be lost due to temporary physical inability to work and that, even in healthy individuals, pregnancy, delivery, and post-partum care were costly. He viewed the state's policy as "singling out for less favorable treatment a gender-linked disability peculiar to women," creating a double standard. He interpreted the policy as one in which

a limitation is imposed upon the disabilities for which women workers may recover, while men receive full compensation for all disabilities suffered. ...In effect, one set of rules is applied to females and another to males. Such dissimilar treatment of men and women, on the basis of physical characteristics inextricably linked to one sex, inevitably constitutes sex discrimination.

Brennan expressed dissatisfaction with Justice Stewart's explanation for his refusal to apply a higher standard of review in a case involving issues tied to sex. Brennan viewed Stewart's opinion as a retreat from recent equal protection decisions and voiced concern that the majority's decision would relegate sex-based classifications to the same "traditional" analysis that had allowed legislation such as that in the 1908 Supreme Court case Muller v. Oregon.

== Aftermath and legacy ==
After the ruling, lower district and appeals courts limited the scope of the ruling by applying it only to cases brought under the Equal Protection Clause and not Title VII of the Civil Rights Act of 1964. The Supreme Court closed that avenue two years later in General Electric Co. v. Gilbert (1976), which extended Geduldig to Title VII. Congress overruled Gilbert by passing the Pregnancy Discrimination Act, but did not overrule Geduldig, which still applied to all non-Title VII cases.

Constitutional scholars considered Geduldig "an anomaly and outdated" because it was immediately rejected by Congress and the public. Other law professors argued that it had been effectively overruled by United States v. Virginia (1996) and Nevada Department of Human Resources v. Hibbs (2003). In her dissent in Coleman v. Maryland Court of Appeals (2012), Justice Ruth Bader Ginsburg stated that it should be explicitly overruled. However, Geduldig was cited in Dobbs v. Jackson Women's Health Organization (2022) to support the notion that abortion restrictions were not sex discrimination and therefore abortion rights could not be covered by the Equal Protection Clause.

Geduldig was cited again by the majority in United States v. Skrmetti (2025), which held that a state law that prevented minors from using puberty blockers to treat gender dysphoria was constitutional. In her dissent, Justice Sonia Sotomayor described Geduldig as "egregiously wrong" when originally decided. University of Michigan law professor Leah Litman compared Skrmetti's use of Geduldig as equivalent to relying on the widely reviled Supreme Court cases Plessy v. Ferguson (1896) or Korematsu v. United States (1944).

== See also ==
- United States labor law
- List of United States Supreme Court cases, volume 417
- Craig v. Boren
- Gender equality
- List of gender equality lawsuits
- Cleveland Board of Education v. LaFleur
