= Total permanent disability insurance =

Law and insurance industry phrase

Total Permanent Disability (TPD) is a phrase used in the insurance industry and in law. Generally speaking, it means that because of a sickness or injury, a person is unable to work in their own or any occupation for which they are suited by training, education, or experience. An individual or group of individuals can insure themselves against it through a disability insurance policy, as part of a life insurance package or through worker's compensation insurance.

== Definitions of permanent disability ==
Ballentine's Law Dictionary defines a permanent disability is one that "will remain with a person throughout" their lifetime, or he or she will not recover, or "that in all possibility, will continue indefinitely."

Insurance companies often have slightly different definitions of what determines permanent disability. However typical definitions would include:

- Loss of two of: Eyes, Arms, or Legs.
- Absence from work for six months due to an accident or illness, without expectation of returning to work.

=== United States ===
Under no-fault insurance law, New York defines significant injury as including a permanent loss of use.

=== Australia ===
Total and Permanent Disablement Insurance is designed to provide a lump sum benefit to the life insured in the event of a medically diagnosed event that renders the claimant unable to work again. TPD Insurance is generally used to cover debts and the ongoing living expenses of an individual to reduce the ongoing financial burden of loss of income.

There are three main types and definitions of TPD Insurance:

- Own Occupation TPD - the claimant must be unable to work in their own occupation ever again.
- Any Occupation TPD - the claimant must be unable to work in their occupation and also any occupation that they are suited to via education, training or experience ever again.
- Non-Occupational TPD - the claimant must be unable to conduct 2 of 5 activities of daily living.

The Own Occupation definition is generally considered to provide the greatest level of protection, with the Non-Occupational TPD requiring the greatest level of disablement before a claim will be considered.

TPD Insurance in Australia can be owned and paid for from superannuation accounts. When TPD Insurance is held in Superannuation, the 'Any Occupation' definition is normally offered as the level of disablement required by Superannuation Law is based on 'Any Occupation.'

TPD Insurance when taken for personal protection is generally not tax deductible and claim payments are not taxable. When TPD Insurance is held in superannuation however a claimant who withdraws the proceeds of their account superannuation account balance, to which a TPD benefit is usually credited to, is taxed.

The maximum level of cover normally available with one insurer in Australia is generally $3 – $5 million with the oldest entry ages varying between 55 - 62.

==== Risk Assessment of TPD Insurance in Australia ====
TPD Insurance is normally underwritten on application and factors such as medical history, family history, past times and unusual occupational risk factors can result in a policy being offered on with exclusions or an increased premium. For higher sums insured, additional medical verification including blood tests and reports from doctors is usually required.

==== Claiming Total and Permanent Disability insurance in Australia ====
Having a claim for Total and Permanent Disability insurance approved can be a cumbersome process for the insured. In Australia, the vast majority of TPD insurance policies are provide by superannuation funds. These funds offer products that are typically more basic than what can be found in the Retail Insurance space. Generally, TPD provided by super funds will require that you have been off work for a period of at least 6 months before they will consider a claim. After this period of time has been met, the claimant will need to provide evidence that two of their treating medical practitioners have certified that the claimant will be unable to ever return to work in any occupation for which they are suited by way of education, training and experience. The process of determining this involves a number of aspects with many claimants seeking professional advice by way of Financial Advisors and Lawyers.

=== The Netherlands ===
This insurance is mainly purchased by self-employed professionals, it is also called 'one person company'. This insurance would cover maximum 80% of the income after the accident. In Dutch, the total permanent disability insurance is called Arbeidsongeschiktheidsverzekering.

== Distinctions ==
TPD differs from income protection insurance in that:

- TPD pays out a lump sum of a policy-specified amount, whilst income protection insurance is designed to replace income and pays out a specified percentage of pre-disability income (e.g. 75%) on a regular basis (e.g. monthly)
- the insured person must be totally disabled on a permanent basis for the insurer to pay out, rather than just totally or partially unable to work.
