= Income protection insurance =

Insurance policy to cover loss of income

Income Protection Insurance (IPI) also known as loss of earnings insurance is an insurance policy paying benefits to policyholders who are incapacitated and hence unable to work due to illness or accident. This is typically a replacement for lost income suffered by the policy holder. These policies were formerly called Permanent Health Insurance (PHI). This type of insurance does not normally cover redundancy and does not pay for medical treatment, it is designed to only pay a monthly amount to cover the loss of income by the policy holder when they are unable to work due to illness or accident.

Income Protection Insurance is principally available in Australia, Ireland, New Zealand, South Africa, and the United Kingdom. A similar insurance product is available in the United States known as "disability income insurance" (disability insurance). A study by British insurer Legal & General in 2014, titled "Deadline to the Breadline Report", found that only 8% of UK households had income protection insurance.

== Tax treatment by country ==
=== Australia ===
Income protection premiums in Australia is tax deductible though the payments received are taxable.

=== Ireland ===
Higher earners can claim back up to 40% of their premiums back as tax relief annually. In Ireland, the maximum payout threshold is 75% of prior gross salary.

=== New Zealand ===
Income protection insurance in New Zealand is more complicated as it depends on whether or not the payments are related to superannuation. In most cases premiums are tax deductible as long as the payouts are taxable. New Zealand has an accident compensation scheme known as Accident Compensation Corporation (ACC) that covers lost income resulting from accidents. Income Protection Insurance can be used in addition to ACC as ACC may not fully replace the income and offers no support for illnesses.

=== United Kingdom ===
Income protection is not tax deductible in the UK, however exceptions are available for the self-employed and for company directors.

== See also ==
- Disability insurance
- Mortgage insurance
- Payment protection insurance
- Total permanent disability insurance
