= Business overhead expense disability insurance =

Insurance policy

Business overhead expense (BOE) disability insurance, also known as Business Expense Insurance, pays the insured's business overhead expenses if he or she becomes disabled. A BOE policy pays a monthly benefit based on actual expenses, not anticipated profits. It is designed for businesses that rely on a small number of people (or one person) to produce revenue.

== Coverage ==
The following business overhead expenses are typically covered by a BOE disability policy:

- Rent
- Interest payments on outstanding eligible business debts
- Utilities (heat, water, telephone, electricity, etc.)
- Non-attorney employees' salaries and payroll taxes
- Postage and stationery
- Equipment maintenance
- Rental, lease, or depreciation of office equipment
- Monthly average of taxes on the premises
- Insurance premiums for Workers' Compensation, Employee Medical Plans, Employee Taxes, General Liability, Professional Liability/Malpractice
- Accounting fees
- Professional memberships and/or subscription dues.

Policies do not typically cover the salary of a temporary employee hired to do the duties for disabled people, unless a substitute salary expense or similar rider is purchased with the policy. Income taxes and the cost of inventory are some expenses that are not covered.

== Characteristics ==
- Benefit Periods: BOE insurance policies have short benefit periods that do not usually exceed two years.
- Elimination Periods: BOE policies typically have short elimination periods; either 30, 60 or 90 days.
- Maximum Benefits: BOE insurance policies offer a maximum monthly benefit, but only reimburses the policy holder for actual overhead expenses incurred if they are less than or equal to the maximum benefit. With some insurers, any unused benefit can be applied to increase future monthly maximums or to extend the benefit period.
- Taxation: BOE insurance benefits are reportable as income and the premiums are tax deductible as a business expense.
- Rates: BOE insurance rates are based on the insured's age (at time of purchase), occupational duties, health status, optional riders selected, benefit period, and elimination period. Once a BOE policy is owned, coverage can not be increased without providing evidence of medical insurability, unless a future increase option or similar rider is purchased at time of policy issue.
