= Pregnancy discrimination =

Type of employment discrimination

Pregnancy discrimination is a type of employment discrimination that occurs when expectant women are fired, not hired, or otherwise discriminated against due to their pregnancy or intention to become pregnant. Common forms of pregnancy discrimination include not being hired due to visible pregnancy or likelihood of becoming pregnant, being fired after informing an employer of one's pregnancy, being fired after maternity leave, and receiving a pay dock due to pregnancy. Pregnancy discrimination may also take the form of denying reasonable accommodations to workers based on pregnancy, childbirth, lactation, and related medical conditions. Discrimination based on using contraception or receiving an abortion, or not doing so, can also qualify as pregnancy discrimination. Pregnancy discrimination has also been examined to have an indirect relationship with the decline of a mother's physical and mental health. Convention on the Elimination of All Forms of Discrimination against Women prohibits dismissal on the grounds of maternity or pregnancy and ensures right to maternity leave or comparable social benefits. The Maternity Protection Convention C 183 proclaims adequate protection for pregnancy as well. Though women have some protection in the United States because of the Pregnancy Discrimination Act of 1978, it has not completely curbed the incidence of pregnancy discrimination. The Equal Rights Amendment could ensure more robust sex equality ensuring that women and men could both work and have children at the same time.

== Motives ==
Employers discriminate on the grounds of pregnancy for a number of reasons:

- insufficient resources to support temporary employees or provide overtime pay for other employees to fulfill the duties during leave
- fear of loss of profits due to loss of productivity or the increased cost of productivity caused by the paid absence of an employee.
- fear of loss of productivity due to the absence of an employee
- prejudices against working women and mothers
- belief that the employee will require too many accommodations even after her return

== United States ==
In the United States, since 1978, employers are legally bound to provide the same insurance, leave pay, and additional support that would be bestowed upon any employee with medical leave or disability. This only applies to companies with 15 or more employees (including part-time and temporary workers).

With more than 70% of women with children in the work force, pregnancy discrimination is the fastest growing type of discrimination in the U.S., and in 2006 represented approximately 6.5% of all discrimination claims filed. The U.S. Equal Employment Opportunity Commission mediates claims between employees and employers. In 2006, the EEOC handled 4,901 claims with an eventual monetary pay-out by various organizations totaling $10.4 million.

=== Federal law ===
The Pregnancy Discrimination Act of 1978 and Family and Medical Leave Act are rooted in the precedent of several major court decisions leading up to them.

The Pregnant Workers Fairness Act (PWFA) requires that employers make reasonable accommodations for any and all qualified employees who are either pregnant or require child care resources. This bill sets forward procedures to enforce the law and protect pregnant employees from these discriminatory practices.

==== Federal case law ====
The Pregnancy Discrimination Act of 1978 and Family and Medical Leave Act are rooted in several major court decisions leading up to them.

In the 1908 case Muller v. Oregon, Muller appealed his conviction for violating a law which limited women to 10-hour workdays in factories and laundries in Oregon, arguing it violated the Fourteenth Amendment. The Supreme Court unanimously upheld the decision that this law was constitutional, as the state has a compelling interest in protecting the health of women. The decision states that “healthy mothers are essential to vigorous offspring, [and therefore] the physical wellbeing of women is an object of public interest”.

Next, in 1974 Cleveland Board of Education v. LaFleur, the court decides that pregnant women cannot be discriminated against arbitrarily, as this violates the due process clause. In this case, multiple pregnant or previously pregnant public school teachers challenged the constitutionality of mandatory maternity leave in both Cleveland, Ohio and Chesterfield County, Virginia. The court answered three questions within this case. First, if the termination of teachers’ employment during the fourth or fifth month of pregnancy for the sake of continuity violates the fourteenth amendment. Second, whether preventing teachers from returning to teaching until their children are three months old violates the Fourteenth Amendment. And last, if requiring a submission of a certificate of health by the mother’s physician before returning to work violates the Fourteenth Amendment. The Court ruled yes for the first two questions, and no for the last question. In this case, the court acted to liberalize the laws surrounding working while pregnant to some degree, but also continued to decide that the state can still regulate women’s work while pregnant.

Two other cases in the 1970s ruled that pregnancy-related conditions could be excluded from benefit coverage. The outcome of these cases appear to be directly responsible for the Pregnancy Discrimination Act. The first Case, Geduldig v. Aiello (1974), ruled that the exclusion of medical benefits for pregnant women in California by the California State Disability Insurance program was non-discriminatory.

While it is true that only women can become pregnant ... the [California State Disability Insurance] program divides potential recipients into two groups- pregnant women and non-pregnant persons. While the first group is exclusively female, the second group includes members of both sexes. The fiscal and actuarial benefits of the program thus accrue to members of both sexes.

The second case, General Electric v. Gilbert (1976), 429 U.S. 125, concluded that companies may exclude pregnancy-related conditions from being covered in their disability plans. The issue before the Supreme Court was if excluding pregnancy-related coverage under the company's disability plan violated Title VII of the Civil Rights Act of 1964. There had been employees who applied for disability benefits when they took an absence due to pregnancy; but, their claims were denied. General Electric provided coverage to their employees for nonoccupational illness and injury, but pregnancy-related conditions were excluded. The Court relied on the precedent in Geduldig and reaffirmed that the condition of pregnancy is categorized as either a pregnant person versus nonpregnant person. Therefore there is no sex based discrimination, and Title VII of the Civil Rights Act of 1964 was not violated. Employers may choose to exclude conditions from being covered on their disability plan. At this point, the court had fully shifted from the argument of protecting women. Instead, the court decides to completely disregard pregnancy and the effects that it can have on the ability to work, essentially deciding to no longer give protection to pregnant women. This remains the prevailing approach of the court today.

Following these cases, in 1978, Congress passed The Pregnancy Discrimination Act of 1978. The Pregnancy Discrimination Act created a provision under Title VII of the Civil Rights Act of 1964 that states sex discrimination on the basis of pregnancy is prohibited.

In 2009 the Supreme Court again addressed pregnancy discrimination with their ruling in AT&T Corp. v. Hulteen that held that maternity leave taken before the passage of the 1978 Pregnancy Discrimination Act cannot be considered in calculating employee pension benefits, therefore essentially implying that the Pregnancy Discrimination Act is not retroactive.

In 2013 EEOC v Houston Funding 717 F.3d 425 (5th Cir. 2013) case, the EEOC went to court with Houston Funding regarding unlawfully firing an employee for lactating at work after recently having given birth. The Court of Appeals declared this was unconstitutional and illegal discrimination on the basis of sex under both Title VII and the Pregnancy Discrimination Act. This decision ultimately became an important precedent that it is illegal to discharge an employee due to expressing milk or lactation.

In 2014 the Supreme Court heard Young v. United Parcel Service, in this case the Supreme Court sought to answer the question of if the Pregnancy Discrimination Act requires an employer to provide the same accommodations to a pregnant employee than to employees with similar non-pregnancy related work limitations. The court found that employers are not required to provide these same accommodations, but asserted that courts must further evaluate the issue of to what extent these employer policies work less-favorably for pregnant individuals rather than non-pregnant employees with similar limitations.

=== State law ===
In 2002, California's Paid Family Leave (PFL) insurance program, also known as the Family Temporary Disability Insurance (FTDI) program, extended unemployment disability compensation to cover individuals who take time off work to bond with a new minor child. PFL covers employees who take time off to bond with their own child or their registered domestic partner's child, or a child placed for adoption or foster-care with them or their domestic partner. California’s Pregnancy Disability Leave Law (PDLL) requires employers to provide up to four months of leave to employees who are disabled due to pregnancy, childbirth, or related medical conditions.

Various U.S. cities have passed additional laws to protect pregnant workers. In 2014, New York City enacted the Pregnant Workers Fairness Act which requires employers to offer reasonable accommodations "to the needs of an employee for her pregnancy, childbirth, or related medical condition that will allow the employee to perform the essential requisites of the job". Also in 2014, Philadelphia amended an ordinance which actually compels employers to make reasonable workplace accommodations for female employees "affected by pregnancy" meaning pregnant women or women who have medical conditions relating to pregnancy or childbirth. Philadelphia's revised ordinance identifies several possible required accommodations, including restroom breaks, periodic rest for those whose jobs require that they stand for long periods of time, special assistance with manual labor, leave for a period of disability arising from childbirth, reassignment to a vacant position, and job restructuring. In 2015, the Washington D.C. passed the Protecting Pregnant Workers Fairness Act of 2014 which is effective March 3, 2015. In 2018 Massachusetts did the same, with the Pregnant Workers Fairness Act going into effect on April 1, 2018.

Oregon’s Family Leave Act assists eligible employees to have up to 12 weeks of leave when it comes to having a child. In addition to this, one is able to qualify either before or after pregnancy for an additional 12 weeks depending on their pregnancy conditions. Oregon’s Family Leave Act covers parental leave, health conditions, sick child leave, pregnancy disability leave, military family leave, and bereavement leave. However, this is often unpaid leave unless one has access to sick days, vacation or other paid leave.

== European Union ==
The European Union regards less favourable treatment on grounds of pregnancy as unlawful, and the same thing as discrimination on grounds of sex (contrasting to the American case of Geduldig v. Aiello and consistent with the American approach in the Pregnancy Discrimination Act of 1978).

The European Court of Justice decided in Dekker v Stichting Vormingscentrum Voor Jonge Volwassen (VJV-Centrum) Plus that pregnancy discrimination was sex discrimination without any requirement for comparing this unfavourable treatment to a man. It reaffirmed this position in Webb v EMO Air Cargo (No 2) where a woman had been dismissed because she had attempted to take pregnancy leave, but had not disclosed this to her employer when hired. As well as a dismissal, a failure to renew a fixed term contract may also be discrimination. Furthermore, during any period of pregnancy or maternity leave there may be no detriment or dismissal in connection with a period of sickness. A woman is also allowed to shorten her maternity leave and return to work when she becomes pregnant again to get the second period of pregnancy, even though she is not fully able to carry out all her normal job functions.

It is also clear that women who are pregnant are protected at job interviews. In the Tele Danmark case a woman was held not to be at fault for not telling an employer she was pregnant while being interviewed for a job, despite knowing she was pregnant. However, a study published in The Netherlands is 2016 showed that 43% of active women experienced discrimination related to pregnancy of motherhood.

== Canada ==
In Canada, pregnancy discrimination is considered a violation of sex-discrimination laws and will be treated as such.

== Other ==
Mexico and Japan have laws to combat pregnancy discrimination.

=== Japan ===
In Japan, Labor Standards Act (Act No. 49 of 1947) provides that an employer must provide an expectant mother worker with maternity leave for 6 weeks (14 weeks for multiple pregnancy beyond twins) before her child birth and 8 weeks after the child birth. Article 9 of Equal Employment Opportunity Act between Men and Women (Act No. 113 of July 1, 1972) prohibits unequal employment condition for the reasons of marriage, pregnancy, maternity leave provided in Article 65 of Labor Standards Act and other reasons related childbirth. These unequal employment conditions includes retirement, dismissal. In addition, Act on the Welfare of Workers Who Take Care of Children or Other Family Members Including Child Care and Family Care Leave (Act No. 76 of 1991) provides that employees has the right to take unpaid child care leave for one year, and Article 10 prohibits for an employer to dismiss or disadvantageously treat a worker who have taken or is about to take Child Care Leave. as Although Maternity Leave and Child Care Leave are basically unpaid leave, Basic Childcare Leave Benefits are provided based on Employment Insurance Act during Child Care Leave and Maternity Allowance and Lump-sum Childbirth Allowance are given based on Health Insurance Act (Act No.70 of 1922). Basic Childcare Leave Benefit is 50% of the employee's wage, and Maternity Allowance is two thirds of the wage. As of 2013, Lump-sum Childcare allowance is ¥420,000 (US$4,075).

=== Hong Kong ===
In Hong Kong, it is a criminal offence if an employer discriminates against a pregnant employee if the employee has been hired under a continuous contract. An employer who contravenes this can be liable to prosecution and, on conviction, fined HK$100,000. The employer would also be required to pay the employee's wages in lieu of notice, a further sum equivalent to one month's wages as compensation, and 10-weeks' maternity leave pay. Pregnant workers who feel they have been discriminated against because of their pregnancy are also protected by the Sex Discrimination Ordinance. A case in 2023 is a case in point, where a company had unlawfully discriminated against a former employee on the ground of her pregnancy by refusing to renew her employment contract and pay her a year-end bonus. Despite the law, women may still feel pressured to leave the workforce due to stress.

=== Taiwan ===
In Taiwan, pregnancy discrimination is considered a violation of sex-discrimination laws and are treated as such if an employer is found guilty. Despite the laws, discrimination against women and especially pregnant women is common place as it is rarely reported and discrimination is tolerated.

=== Cambodia ===
Discrimination of pregnant women is the main issue in Cambodia's garment industry. They were misunderstood with lower efficiency, frequent toilet breaks and maternity leave. According to one of the Cambodian female worker "It doesn't matter whether you are pregnant or not – whether you are sick or not – you have to sit and work. If you take a break, the work piles up on the machine and the supervisor will come and shout. And if a pregnant worker is seen working "slowly" then her contract will not be renewed."

Pregnant women are forced to either leave the factory or go for an abortion. In Cambodia abortion was legalized in 1997, yet 9 out of 10 Cambodian women believed that this action is illegal and undergo this process through unsafe clinics. According to the "Women's Health Cambodia", more than 90% of garment workers did not know abortion was legal and 18% out of 900 garment workers had an abortion. Almost 75% of the women do not know where to seek for a safe abortion as there were little information provided to them.

In Cambodia, there are laws that provide pregnant women three months of maternity leave and maternity pay if the worker has worked for a year or longer. Most of the workers were given a fixed duration contract (FDC) with a 6-month contract period. Often the FDC of pregnant women are shortened as factories do not want to provide extra cost of maternity pays or any other health care.

=== Australia ===
Australia has tried to combat the issues of pregnancy discrimination in their workforce. After The United Nations created the Convention on the Elimination of all Forms of Discrimination Against Women (CEDAW) in 1981, Australia signed in agreement on August 17, 1983. Australia also passed the Sexual Discrimination act of 1984 to help eliminate discrimination in the workplace based on many things including pregnancy discrimination. This legislation doesn't allow or permit the right to base hiring and firing practices on pregnancy or the chance of pregnancy. The Sexual Discrimination Act also states, "It is unlawful to refuse the requests to accommodate a pregnant employee. It is also unlawful to accept the request, but take too long to accommodate those needs"

However, it is reported despite the Sexual Discrimination Act of 1984 there are still many cases of work related discrimination based on pregnancy. Nearly one in two women (49%) surveyed by the AHRC reported experiencing pregnancy-related discrimination at work (AHRC, 2014: 26). Australia's government is having a hard time enforcing the Sexual Discrimination Act because employers are arguing that there is no way to prove their actions are based on the pregnancy of their female employees or interviewees. Women have a hard time in court proving that the discrimination was based on pregnancy. Employers can base their choice to pass on a candidate by saying that the women won't be able to perform certain tasks entailed in the job. This action has a hard time being refuted in court because employers can say there was another candidate that was more capable of the tasks and has nothing to do with pregnancy.

== See also ==
- Antinatalism
- Gender pay gap
- UK employment discrimination law
- US employment discrimination law
