= Ragsdale v. Wolverine World Wide, Inc. =

- Supreme Court of the United States

Argued January 7, 2002 Decided March 19, 2002
- Full case name: Ragsdale, et al. v. Wolverine World Wide, Inc.
- Docket no.: 00-6029
- Citations: 535 U.S. 81 (more) 122 S. Ct. 1155; 152 L. Ed. 2d 167

Case history
- Prior: 218 F.3d 933 (8th Cir. 2000); cert. granted, 533 U.S. 928 (2001).

Holding
- 29 CFR 825.700(a) is contrary to the Family and Medical Leave Act of 1993 and beyond authority of the Secretary of Labor. United States Court of Appeals for the Eighth Circuit reverse and remanded.

Court membership
- Chief Justice William Rehnquist Associate Justices John P. Stevens · Sandra Day O'Connor; Antonin Scalia · Anthony Kennedy; David Souter · Clarence Thomas; Ruth Bader Ginsburg · Stephen Breyer

Case opinions
- Majority: Kennedy, joined by Rehnquist, Stevens, Scalia, Thomas
- Dissent: O'Connor, joined by Souter, Ginsburg, Breyer

Ragsdale v. Wolverine World Wide, Inc., 535 U.S. 81 (2002), is a U.S. labor law case, concerning the scope of federal preemption against state law for labor rights.

== Facts ==
Ragsdale claimed her job was unjustly terminated. The Department of Labor had a penalty to make employers notify employees of the rules for securing more generous family or medical leave, than existed under the Family and Medical Leave Act of 1993 (FMLA) guarantees employees 12 weeks unpaid leave.

== Opinion of the Court ==
The Supreme Court held by five to four that the FMLA precluded the right of the Department of Labor to draft penalty rules.

== Dissent ==
Justice O'Connor dissented (joined by Justices Ginsburg, Souter, and Breyer) holding that nothing prevented the rule, and it was the Department of Labor's job to enforce the law.

The Court today holds that the Family and Medical Leave Act of 1993 (FMLA or Act), 29 U. S. C. § 2601 et seq. (1994 ed. and Supp. V), clearly precludes the Secretary of Labor from adopting a rule requiring an employer to give an employee notice that leave is FMLA qualifying before the leave may be counted against the employer's 12-week obligation. Because I believe the Secretary is justified in requiring such individualized notice and because I think that nothing in the Act constrains the Secretary's ability to secure compliance with that requirement by refusing to count the leave against the employer's statutory obligation, I respectfully dissent.

== See also ==
- United States labor law
