= Paid Family Leave (California) =

Insurance program in California

California's Paid Family Leave (PFL) insurance program, which is also known as the Family Temporary Disability Insurance (FTDI) program, is a law enacted in 2002 that extends unemployment disability compensation to cover individuals who take time off work to care for a seriously ill family member or bond with a new minor child. Eligible recipients can receive benefit payments for up to eight weeks. Payments are about 70 to 90 percent of your weekly wages earned 5 to 18 months before your claim start date. Benefits may be paid by debit card or check. Benefits equal approximately 70% of earnings and have a maximum per week, for a total of up to six weeks.

The Paid Family Leave program is administered by the State Disability Insurance (SDI) program of the Employment Development Department. Benefits commenced on July 1, 2004. The PFL insurance program is fully funded by employees' contributions, similar to the SDI program.

The statute states that PFL must be taken concurrently with leave under the federal Family and Medical Leave Act (FMLA) and the California Family Rights Act (CFRA), both of which provide for twelve weeks of unpaid leave in a twelve-month period. In other words, the FMLA and CFRA offer job protection for up to twelve weeks of family leave whereas PFL offers compensation for up to eight weeks.

== History ==
In 2002, after an extended campaign by the California Labor Federation, AFL-CIO and the California Work & Family Coalition led at the time by the Labor Project for Working Families, California was the first state to pass a law requiring the Paid Family Leave program. As of mid-2008, the only other states that had passed laws to offer paid family leave benefits were Washington and New Jersey.

In 2009, five years after California's paid family leave law first went into effect, Congresswoman Lynn Woolsey, a Democrat from the same state, introduced H.R. 2339, the Family Income Responding to Significant Transitions (FIRST) Act, which would provide federal grants to states with existing paid family leave laws to implement and administer their paid family leave programs, and would encourage other states to develop their own paid family leave programs.

In 2025, benefit amounts were increased following the passage of SB 951.

== Provisions ==
In order to qualify for PFL, employees must participate in the State Disability Insurance (SDI) Program (or a voluntary plan in lieu of SDI).

Benefits under the program include the following:

- PFL allows for up to six weeks of paid leave in a twelve-month period.
- PFL covers employees who take time off to bond with their own child or their registered domestic partner's child, or a child placed for adoption or foster-care with them or their domestic partner. Eligibility expires one year from the minor child's date of birth, adoption, or foster care placement.
- PFL also covers employees who take time off to care for a seriously ill child, parent, spouse or domestic partner.

=== Exclusions ===
An employee may not receive PFL insurance benefits if he or she is also eligible for or already receiving State Disability Insurance, Unemployment Compensation Insurance, or Workers' Compensation.

An employer may require employees to take up to two weeks earned, but unused, vacation prior to the employee’s initial receipt of PFL benefits.

=== Job security ===
The PFL does not offer job security stipulations. Instead, it relies on the limited job security already provided by federal and state laws: an employer is only required to grant time off and to hold a job for an employee if the employer is covered by the Family and Medical Leave Act (FMLA) or the California Family Rights Act (CFRA). The California Family Rights Act offers twelve weeks of unpaid leave for employees of firms with more than 20 workers.

=== Benefit rates ===
The California Employment Development Department offers a tool to help calculate benefit payment amounts.

Benefits are set at 70% of income for low income earners and 60% for middle and high income earners, however there is a maximum weekly benefit that is tied to the State Average Weekly Wage corresponding to the year of the claim. For 2019, this maximum is $1252 while the lower range of weekly benefits is $50.

To qualify for the minimum weekly amount ($50), an individual must have at least $300 of wages (or $75 per quarter) in the base period, which covers 12 months and is divided into four quarters of three months each.

== Awareness and usage patterns ==
In the first year of the program's passage, only 138,000 people applied for benefits. This was less than half of California's estimate for number of benefit recipients, 300,000. Of those claims, 88% were for bonding with a new child while 12% were for caring for an ill family member. Females dominated the claims, making up 83% of new child claims and 70% of care claims. Although the low number of claims could have been due to the program being relatively unknown, benefits of the program being too low may also have had an impact.

In a study conducted in California and Illinois of parents of chronically ill children before (2003-2004) and after (2005–2006) the passage of PFL, no difference was observed in time taken off work to care for a sick or newly born child. Of those parents surveyed, only 18% had heard of the program and 5% had used it.

In a survey of 253 employers and 500 employees, 89% of employers said they experienced no noticeable effect or a positive effect from the program, with larger employers having a more favorable view than small employers, possibly because they are likely to already provide paid family leave. Sixty percent of employers reported saving on costs by coordinating their own sick leave with PFL.

In a 2007 survey of California adults, only 28.1% were aware of the PFL program.

== Impact ==
A 2019 study found that Paid Family Leave policy in California lead to increases in "the overall duration of breastfeeding by nearly 18 days, and the likelihood of breastfeeding for at least six months by 5 percentage points."

== See also ==
- California State Disability Insurance (SDI)
- Family and Medical Leave Act of 1993
- United States state disability programs
- Parental leave
- Domestic partnerships in California
