= Cleveland Board of Education v. LaFleur =

- Supreme Court of the United States

Argued October 15, 1973 Decided January 21, 1974
- Full case name: Cleveland Board of Education v. Jo Carol LaFleur
- Citations: 414 U.S. 632 (more) 94 S. Ct. 791; 39 L. Ed. 2d 52; 1974 U.S. LEXIS 44; 6 Fair Empl. Prac. Cas. (BNA) 1253; 7 Empl. Prac. Dec. (CCH) ¶ 9072; 67 Ohio Op. 2d 126

Case history
- Prior: La Fleur v. Cleveland Bd. of Education, 326 F. Supp. 1208 (N.D. Ohio 1971); reversed, 465 F.2d 1184 (6th Cir. 1972); cert. granted, 411 U.S. 947 (1973).; Cohen v. Chesterfield County Sch. Bd., 326 F. Supp. 1159 (E.D. Va. 1971); reversed, 474 F.2d 395 (4th Cir. 1973); cert. granted, 411 U.S. 947 (1973).

Holding
- Overly restrictive maternity leave regulations in public schools violate the Due Process Clause of the Fifth and Fourteenth Amendments.

Court membership
- Chief Justice Warren E. Burger Associate Justices William O. Douglas · William J. Brennan Jr. Potter Stewart · Byron White; Thurgood Marshall · Harry Blackmun; Lewis F. Powell Jr. · William Rehnquist

Case opinions
- Majority: Stewart, joined by Brennan, White, Marshall, Blackmun
- Concurrence: Douglas
- Concurrence: Powell
- Dissent: Rehnquist, joined by Burger

Laws applied
- U.S. Const. amends. V, XIV

Cleveland Board of Education v. LaFleur, 414 U.S. 632 (1974), found that overly restrictive maternity leave regulations in public schools violate the Due Process Clause of the Fifth Amendment and the Fourteenth Amendment.

== Facts ==
The plaintiffs claimed that an employer's requirement to take maternity leave from public schools violated the Due Process Clause of the Fourteenth Amendment.

== Judgment ==
On January 21, 1974, the Court delivered its ruling. The majority opinion, consolidated with a similar case from Virginia, was delivered by Justice Stewart.

The Supreme Court ruled that the mandatory maternity leave rules were unconstitutional under the Due Process Clauses in the Fifth and Fourteenth Amendments. Essentially, the rules were found to be too arbitrary (fixed dates chosen for no apparent reason) and irrebuttable (having no relation to individual medical conditions and with no way to make exceptions for good reason). In the Court's opinion, Justice Stewart went on to explain:

This Court has long recognized that freedom of personal choice in matters of marriage and family life is one of the liberties protected by the Due Process Clause ... By acting to penalize the pregnant teacher for deciding to bear a child, overly restrictive maternity leave regulations can constitute a heavy burden on the exercise of these protected freedoms. .. (P)ublic school maternity leave rules directly affect "one of the basic civil rights of man," ... the Due Process Clause of the Fourteenth Amendment requires that such rules must not needlessly, arbitrarily, or capriciously impinge upon this vital area of a teacher's constitutional liberty."

== Significance ==
This decision was a major step in protecting the rights of teachers, especially female teachers, from unfair prejudicial rules which would keep them from the profession of teaching. This decision also plays a critical role in the professionalization of teaching by protecting all teachers from arbitrary, political regulations which serve no pedagogical function. The case of LaFleur can also be seen as a building block for current family leave laws, e.g. Family and Medical Leave Act of 1993, which help to ensure that all people can keep their professions without giving up the ability, and the means, to have a family.

Teaching was one of the first careers outside of the home which was open to American women. As a result, in the late 19th century and the 20th century, women dominated the field of teaching. In 1919, 86% of teachers were women. However, traditional attitudes in American society still held that a women's primary role should be that of housewife. This bias was shared by the male administrators and politicians, who generally ran the schools, and thus married women were discouraged from, and overlooked for, teaching positions. This was justified by the belief that men and single women needed the jobs more. Only after the World War II labor shortages were married women widely hired as teachers.

After the war, many married women remained employed as teachers; however, traditional prejudices against them endured. The attitude changed focus into discrimination against pregnant women. In 1948, a National Education Association survey showed 43% of schools as having no maternity leave, and the rest having compulsory maternity leave. The compulsory maternity leave rules were grounded in the belief that women were incapable of making their own decisions about work, health care, and their professional competency. Most of these compulsory maternity leave rules required teachers to take leave 4–6 months before childbirth until well after the child was born, leaving visibly pregnant women basically unable to work. Virtually all maternity leave was unpaid. The stated rationale behind these compulsory maternity leave laws were: that pregnant women could not meet the physical or mental demands of the job, that pregnancy interrupted the continuity of instruction for students, and that pregnant women might get hurt on the job. In this case the court found that this reasoning was faulty, as women do not lose all sense and ability simply because they are visibly pregnant.

== See also ==
- United States labor law
- List of United States Supreme Court cases, volume 414
- Cleveland Board of Education v. Loudermill (1985) - Another case involving the school district
