= Disability insurance =

Insurance providing income protection when a disability prevents a person from working

Disability Insurance, often called DI or disability income insurance, or income protection, is a form of insurance that insures the beneficiary's earned income against the risk that a disability creates a barrier for completion of core work functions. For example, the worker may be unable to maintain composure in the case of psychological disorders or sustain an injury, illness or condition that causes physical impairment or incapacity to work. DI encompasses paid sick leave, short-term disability benefits (STD), and long-term disability benefits (LTD). The same concept is instantiated in some countries as income protection insurance. Just under one in four of today’s 20-year-olds can expect to become disabled before reaching normal retirement age, according to a report by the Social Security Administration’s Office of the Chief Actuary.

== History ==
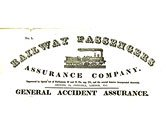
The Railway Passengers Assurance Company was founded in 1848 as the first company to provide accident insurance.

In the late 19th century, modern disability insurance began to become available. It was originally known as "accident insurance". The first company to offer accident insurance was the Railway Passengers Assurance Company, formed in 1848 in England to insure against the rising number of fatalities on the nascent railway system. It was registered as the Universal Casualty Compensation Company to:

...grant assurances on the lives of persons traveling by railway and to grant, in cases, of accident not having a fatal termination, compensation to the assured for injuries received under certain conditions.

The company was able to reach an agreement with the railway companies, whereby basic accident insurance would be sold as a package deal along with travel tickets to customers. The company charged higher premiums for second and third class travel due to the higher risk of injury in the roofless carriages.

=== Individual disability insurance ===
Those whose employers do not provide benefits, self-employed individuals, and employees looking to cover the shortfall of their group disability insurance may purchase policies themselves. Premiums and available benefits for individual coverage vary considerably between companies, occupations, states and countries. In general, premiums are higher for policies that provide more monthly benefits, offer benefits for longer periods of time, and start payments of benefits more quickly following a disability claim. Premiums also tend to be higher for policies that define disability in broader terms, meaning the policy would pay benefits in a wider variety of circumstances. Web-based disability insurance calculators assist in determining the disability insurance needed.

=== High-limit disability insurance ===
High-limit disability insurance is designed to keep individual disability benefits at 65% of income regardless of income level. Coverage is typically issued supplemental to standard coverage. With high-limit disability insurance, benefits can be anywhere from an additional $2,000 to $100,000 per month. Single policy issue and participation (individual or group long-term disability) coverage has gone up to $30,000 with some hospitals.

=== Business overhead expense disability insurance ===
Business Overhead Expense (BOE) coverage reimburses a business for overhead expenses should the owner experience a disability. Eligible benefits include: rent or mortgage payments, utilities, leasing costs, laundry/maintenance, accounting/billing and collection service fees, business insurance premiums, salaries of non-owner employees, employee benefits, property tax, and other regular monthly expenses.

=== National social insurance programs ===
In most developed countries, the single most important form of disability insurance is that provided by the national government for all citizens. For example:

- The United Kingdom's version is part of National Insurance;
- The United States' version is Social Security (SS): specifically, several parts of SS including Social Security Disability Insurance (SSDI) and Supplemental Security Income (SSI). These programs provide a floor beneath all other disability insurance. In other words, they are the safety net that catches everyone who is otherwise (a) uninsured or (b) underinsured. As such, they are large programs with many beneficiaries. The general theory of the benefit formula is that the benefit is enough to prevent abject poverty.
- Switzerland's disability insurance is a part of the pension system in Switzerland.

=== Employer-supplied disability insurance ===
One of the most common reasons for disability is on-the-job injury, which explains why the second largest form of disability insurance is that provided by employers to cover their employees. There are several subtypes that may or may not be separate parts of the benefits package: workers' compensation and more general disability insurance policies.

==== Workers' compensation ====
Workers' compensation (also known by variations of that name, e.g., workman's comp, workmen's comp, worker's comp, compo) offers payments to employees who are (usually temporarily, rarely permanently) unable to work because of a job-related injury. However, workers' compensation is in fact more than just income insurance, because it compensates for economic loss (past and future), reimbursement or payment of medical and life expenses (functioning in this case as a form of health insurance), and benefits payable to the dependents of workers killed during employment (offering a form of life insurance). Workers compensation provides no coverage to those not working. Statistics have shown that most disabilities occur while the injured person is not working and therefore not covered by workers' compensation.

Newsweek magazine's cover story for March 5, 2007 discussed the problems that American veterans of Afghanistan and Iraq wars have faced in receiving VA benefits. The article describes one veteran who waited 17 months to start receiving payments. Another article, in The New York Times, points out that besides long waits, there is also variation based on the veteran's state of residence and whether he/she is a veteran of the Army, National Guard, or Reserves. The Newsweek article says that it can be difficult for a veteran to get his or her claim approved; Newsweek described the benefits thus:

"A veteran with a disability rating of 100 percent gets about $2,400 a month—more if he or she has children. A 50 percent rating brings in around $700 a month. But for many returning servicemen burdened with wounds, it is, initially at least, their sole income."

The 2007 figures cited above correspond in 2012 to $2,673 a month (more with children) and, for the 50% rating, $797 a month for a single veteran.

According to a sidebar in the same Newsweek article, the Americans injured in these wars, for all the obstacles to proper care, will probably receive much better compensation and health care than equally injured Afghan or Iraqi soldiers .

== See also ==
- Business overhead expense disability insurance
- Disability pension
- Health insurance in the United States
- Right to social security
- State Disability Insurance (California)
- State disability benefits
- Social Security Disability Insurance
- Total permanent disability insurance
