= General Electric Co. v. Gilbert =

General Electric Company v. Gilbert
- Supreme Court of the United States

Argued January 19–20, 1976 Reargued October 13, 1976 Decided December 7, 1976
- Full case name: General Electric Company v. Martha V. Gilbert, et al.
- Citations: 429 U.S. 125 (more)
- Argument: Oral argument

Case history
- Prior: Relief granted, 375 F.Supp. 367, (E.D.V.A. 1974); decision affirmed, 519 F.2d 661 (4th Cir. 1975); cert granted, 423 U.S. 822 (1975).

Holding
- Petitioners' disability benefits plan does not violate Title VII because of its failure to cover pregnancy-related disabilities. United States Court of Appeals for the Fourth Circuit reversed.

Court membership
- Chief Justice Warren E. Burger Associate Justices William J. Brennan Jr. · Potter Stewart; Byron White · Thurgood Marshall; Harry Blackmun · Lewis F. Powell Jr. William Rehnquist · John P. Stevens

Case opinions
- Majority: Rehnquist, joined by Burger, Powell, Stewart, White; Blackmun (in part)
- Concurrence: Stewart
- Concurrence: Blackmun (in part)
- Dissent: Brennan, joined by Marshall
- Dissent: Stevens

Laws applied
- Title VII of the Civil Rights Act of 1964
- Superseded by
- Pregnancy Discrimination Act of 1978

General Electric Co. v. Gilbert, 429 U.S. 125 (1976), is a 1976 United States Supreme Court case authored by Chief Justice William Rehnquist concerning gender-based discrimination under Title VII of the Civil Rights Act of 1964. In a 6–3 decision, the Court held that pregnancy could reasonably be excluded from an employer's disability benefits plan. The Court's majority opinion applied its conclusion in Geduldig v. Aiello (1974), which held that exclusion of pregnancy from a disability plan did not violate the Equal Protection Clause of the Fourteenth Amendment to the United States Constitution. Without a showing that pregnancy-based distinctions are "mere pretexts designed to effect an invidious discrimination", Geduldig required only a reasonable basis for the pregnancy-based distinction.

The decision in Gilbert generated considerable backlash and prompted Congress to abrogate it by passing the Pregnancy Discrimination Act of 1978. The Supreme Court itself later acknowledged that this Act had overturned its holding in Gilbert, namely, that pregnancy discrimination was not unlawful sex discrimination under Title VII.
