= California State Disability Insurance =

State disability program

California State Disability Insurance (SDI or CASDI) is a statutory (state-regulated and state-audited) state disability program of the State of California for short-term disability income replacement. The program has been in effect since 1946.

== Costs ==
The costs of the program are covered by contributions to the State Fund in the form of SDI tax paid by employees, optionally by employers. Employee contributions to the state fund are deductible as state taxes. The table below summarizes the contribution rates, taxable wage limits and maximum withholdings per employee since 1996:

Year	Rate	Eligible Wages	Max Withholding
2026	1.30%	No Cap	No Cap
2025	1.20%	No Cap	No Cap
2024	1.10%	No Cap	No Cap
2023	0.90%	153,164	1,378.48
2022	1.10%	145,600	1,601.60
2021	1.20%	128,298	1,539.58
2020	1.00%	122,909	1,229.09
2019	1.00%	118,371	1,183.71
2018	1.00%	114,967	1,149.67
2017	0.90%	110,902	998.12
2016	0.90%	106,742	960.68
2015	0.90%	104,378	939.40
2014	1.00%	101,636	1,016.36
2013	1.00%	100,880	1,008.80
2012	1.00%	95,585	955.85
2011	1.20%	93,316	1,119.79
2010	1.10%	93,316	1,026.48
2009	1.10%	90,669	997.36
2008	0.80%	86,698	693.58
2007	0.60%	83,389	500.33
2006	0.80%	79,418	635.34
2005	1.08%	79,418	857.71
2004	1.18%	68,829	812.18
2003	0.90%	56,916	512.24
2002	0.90%	46,327	416.94
2001	0.70%	46,327	324.29
2000	0.65%	46,327	301.13
1999	0.50%	31,767	158.84
1998	0.50%	31,767	158.84
1997	0.50%	31,767	158.84
1996	0.50%	31,767	158.84

== Benefits ==
The plan provides up to one year of tax-free benefits equal to 55% of the recipient's average gross (pre-tax) income in their highest earning base period quarter. The minimum benefit is $50 per week, and the maximum benefit is updated each year. The "base period" for determining benefits is defined as 12 months divided into four consecutive quarters, excluding the quarter immediately prior - i.e., the lookback period is ~17 months pre-disability up to ~5 months pre-disability. For example, assuming the recipient's highest quarterly earnings were $3,900, dividing by 13 weeks gives an average pay rate of $300 per week. At 55% of this, the benefit amount would be $165 per week.

For 2018–2021, the benefit was changed to 60% of regular weekly salary if earning above $23,972 annually and 70% of regular weekly salary if earning less than that.

Maximum weekly benefit

Year	Max Weekly Benefit
2022	1,540
2021	1,357
2020	1,300
2019	1,252
2018	1,216
2017	1,173
2016	1,129
2015	1,104
2014	1,075
2013	1,067
2012	1,011
2011	987
2010	987
2009	959
2008	917
2007	882
2006	840
2005	840
2004	728
2003	603

SDI is deductible on federal returns (Schedule A) because it is considered a state income tax.

== Family Temporary Disability Insurance ==
In 2002, California enacted the Paid Family Leave (PFL) insurance program, also known as the Family Temporary Disability Insurance (FTDI) program, which extends unemployment disability compensation to cover individuals who take time off work to care for a seriously ill family member or bond with a new child.

== See also ==
- United States state disability programs
- Paid family leave
- Family and Medical Leave Act of 1993
