= State disability benefits =

Disability symbols

State disability insurance is a type of insurance for workers who are ill, unable or injured. It partially replaces wages in the event a worker is unable to perform their work due to a disability. In some states, there are many types of organisations that provide different disability insurance. These organisations have specific definitions regarding what is a disability and how a person should qualify in order to receive the benefit.

== State disability insurance in the United States ==
State disability insurance is provided in five states (California, Hawaii, New Jersey, New York, and Rhode Island) and in one commonwealth (Puerto Rico) of the United States. Disability insurance (also known as state disability insurance, statutory disability programs or state disability benefits) is a kind of insurance, which is funded by mandatory contribution of employees.

Employees can lower the tax they have to pay to their state, by the fact that their contributions are tax-deductible.

There is a difference between the states in details of the state disability insurance and tax-deductive.

=== Statutory disability insurance in New York State ===
In New York State, there is a disability benefits insurance, that provides temporary cash benefits paid to an eligible wage earner to partially replace wages lost, whether the wage earner is disabled by an off-the-job illness or injury or for disabilities arising from pregnancy.

==== Who is required to provide state disability benefits insurance according to New York State disability insurance ====
Each employer, who hires one and more employees on each of 30 days in any calendar year, is required to provide state disability benefits insurance for their employees. These employees have to provide it unless they are considered exempt.

==== Among those employees, who are not considered exempt belongs ====
- Each employer of one or more employees on each of 30 days in any calendar year becomes a "covered" employer four weeks after the 30th day of such employment.
- Employees or recent employees of a "covered" employer, who have worked at least four consecutive weeks.
- Employees of an employer who elects to provide benefits by filing an Application for Voluntary Coverage.
- Employees who change jobs from one "covered" employer to another "covered" employer are protected from the first day on the new job. Generally, an eligible employee does not lose protection during the first 26 weeks of unemployment, provided he/she is eligible for and is claiming unemployment insurance benefits.
- Domestic or personal employees who work 40 or more hours per week for one employer.

==== Among those employees, who are considered exempt belongs ====
- A minor child of the employer.
- Government, railroad, maritime or farm laborers.
- Ministers, priests, rabbis, members of religious orders, sextons, Christian Science readers.
- Individuals that volunteer their services for nonprofit organizations and receive no compensation. Compensation includes stipends, room and board, and other "perks" that have monetary value. (Stipends used solely to offset expenses incurred while performing activities for the nonprofit are not counted as stipends.)
- An executive officer of an incorporated religious, charitable or educational institution, and persons engaged in a professional or teaching capacity in or for a religious, charitable, or educational institution (Section 501(c)(3) under the IRS tax code), and persons receiving rehabilitation services in a sheltered workshop operated by such institutions under a certificate issued by the U.S. Department of Labor.
- Persons receiving aid from a religious or charitable institution, who perform work in return for such aid.
- One or two corporate officers who either singly or jointly own all of the stock and hold all of the offices of a corporation that employs no other employees.
- Golf caddies.
- Daytime students in elementary or secondary school, who work part-time during the school year or their regular vacation period.
- Employees who change to jobs in an exempt employment or with a "non-covered" employer, and work in such employment for more than four weeks, lose protection until they work four consecutive weeks for a "covered" employer.

== Statutory disability insurance in the United Kingdom ==
In the UK, people can apply for Disability Living Allowance (DLA) if they are under 16. If they are above 16, they can apply for Personal Independence Payment (PIP).

=== Disability Living Allowance (DLA) ===
DLA is made up of two parts: the care component and the mobility component. The person can get DLA if they are eligible for at least one of the components.

The person is eligible for the care component if they cannot do everyday tasks (e.g. washing, dressing, eating, using the toilet etc.) and there is no one who can care for them or if they live alone. There are three levels: lowest (for occasional help), middle (for frequent help or constant supervision), and highest (for nonstop supervision).

The person is eligible for the mobility component if they have a walking disability, have no legs, are blind, are at least 80% deaf, have behavioural problems or need walking supervision. There are two levels: lower (for guidance or supervision outdoors) and higher (for more severe walking difficulties).

=== Personal Independence Payment (PIP) ===
Personal Independence Payment helps the person financially, if they have a chronic illness or if they are disabled. They receive between £23.20 and £148.85 per week if they are 16 or older and have not reached State Pension age.

== State disability insurance in the Czech Republic ==
In the Czech Republic, prior to 2010, disabled people were divided into two categories based on the seriousness of their disability. These two categories were partial invalidity and full invalidity.

Since 2010, there is just one category of benefits, the invalidity pension, which is divided into three degrees corresponding with the severity of the person's disability. The severity is measured by how disruptive the disability is.

An invalid pension cannot be collected along with an old-age pension.

Degrees of disability:

- 35–49%: first degree disability
- 50–69%: second degree disability
- 70–100%: third degree disability

=== Conditions for reaching the invalidity pension ===
- They have any of the three disability degrees, which are mentioned above.
- They are under 65.
- They do not comply with the conditions for the purpose of obtaining a standard old-age pension.
- They have previously completed the stipulated periods of pension insurance.

The lowest amount of money they can receive in any degree of disability is CZK 770.00 (€30) per month. The base amount is CZK 2,700.00 (€105) per month. It is a fixed portion of an invalidity pension.

Eligibility for an invalidity pension is based on a required term of insurance based on: the applicant's age required term of insurance:

- Under 20: less than one year
- 20–22: one year
- 22–24: two years
- 24–26: three years
- 26–28: four years
- Over 28: five years
- Over 38: ten years

For instance, if the person was born in 1953, their disability was recognized in 2014 and they are insured for 44 years, they get from the State Invalidity pension of CZK 13,262.00 (€516) per month.
