= Pregnancy Discrimination Act =

1978 US federal law

- Other short titles: The Pregnancy Discrimination Act of 1978
- Long title: An Act to amend Title VII of the Civil Rights Act of 1964 to prohibit sex discrimination on the basis of pregnancy.
- Acronyms (colloquial): PDA
- Enacted by: the 95th United States Congress

Citations
- Public law: 95-555
- Statutes at Large: 92 Stat. 2077

Legislative history
- Signed into law by President Jimmy Carter on October 31, 1978

United States Supreme Court cases
- California Federal Savings and Loan Association v. Guerra, 479 U.S. 272 (1987); United Automobile Workers v. Johnson Controls, Inc., 499 U.S. 187 (1991); AT&T Corp. v. Hulteen, 556 U.S. 701 (2009); Young v. United Parcel Service, 575 U.S. 206 (2015)

The Pregnancy Discrimination Act (PDA) of 1978 (Pub. L. 95–555) is a United States federal statute. It amended Title VII of the Civil Rights Act of 1964 to "prohibit sex discrimination on the basis of pregnancy."

The act covers discrimination "on the basis of pregnancy, childbirth, or related medical conditions." Employers with fewer than 15 employees are exempted from the act. Employers are exempt from providing medical coverage for elective abortions, unless the mother's life is threatened, but are required to provide disability and sick leave for women who are recovering from an abortion.

== History of the act ==
The law was passed as a direct response to the United States Supreme Court decision in General Electric Company v. Gilbert (1976), in which the Court held that pregnancy discrimination was not a form of sex discrimination under the Civil Rights Act of 1964.

In March 2015, the Supreme Court of the United States' decision in Young v. United Parcel Service, provided additional clarity on whether and when employers are required to provide work-related accommodations to pregnant employees. The lawsuit stemmed from United Parcel Service's refusal to accommodate a 20-pound lifting restriction of a driver during her pregnancy. Because Young could not lift the required 70 pounds for drivers, UPS did not allow her to work. Young provided evidence that a number of employees received accommodations while suffering similar or more serious disabilities. According to the testimony of one UPS employee, the only time a light-duty request seemed to become an issue occurred when the request was made by a pregnant employee. The Court held that a pregnant employee can make a prima facie, meaning a plausible case of discrimination, by showing that "she belongs to the protected class, that she sought accommodation, that the employer did not accommodate her." The Court further held that a plaintiff can meet a summary judgement standard "by providing evidence that the employer accommodates a large percentage of nonpregnant workers while failing to accommodate a large percentage of pregnant workers."

== Disability clause ==
Pregnancy is considered a temporary disability in the eyes of the law, meaning that the treatment of pregnant employees falls under the same jurisdiction as disabled employees. Treating a pregnant employee in a way that would violate disability standards is also a violation of the Pregnancy Discrimination Act (PDA).

If an employee is temporarily unable to perform her job due to pregnancy, the employer must treat her the same as any other temporarily disabled employee; for example, by providing light duty, modified tasks, alternative assignments, disability leave, or leave without pay. An employer may have to provide a reasonable accommodation for a disability related to pregnancy, absent undue hardship (significant difficulty or expense)."

== Critical cases ==
The Geduldig v. Aiello (1974) case involved a pregnant woman who was denied medical benefits under her disability insurance, citing the Fourteenth Amendment, and claiming sex discrimination. The U.S. Supreme Court concluded that there was no evidence of sex discrimination, and that there was no violation of the Equal Protection Clause, as men and women were receiving equal protection under the insurance program, and that because men cannot become pregnant, offering protections for pregnancy would constitute unequal treatment. The court in this case also did not use a heightened level of scrutiny, meaning that the court did not treat this case as one of high importance. This treatment was criticized by Justice Brennan in a dissent in which he argued that physical gender differences should not lead to unequal compensation, and that gender cases should be decided using the strict scrutiny standard.

General Electric v. Gilbert (1976) in many ways was influenced by the decision of Geduldig v. Aiello, as the Supreme Court again found no evidence of discrimination. Specifically, in General Electric v. Gilbert the Supreme Court ruled that it was legal for employers to exclude pregnancy-related conditions from employee sickness and accident benefits plans. Again, Justice Brennan dissented, noting for a second time that women were receiving unequal compensation. Due to this dissent and the dissent from Geduldig v. Aiello, U.S. Congress saw a gap in protections and created the Pregnancy Discrimination Act two years later in response.

== Other important cases ==
Rentzer v. Unemployment Ins. Appeals Bd. (1973) Gail Rentzer suffered from an ectopic pregnancy and was therefore unable to work. She was denied compensation by the California Unemployment Insurance Appeals Board because they did not recognize pregnancy or related medical complications as a disability. But after a lawsuit was filed, the California Court of Appeals found that because Gail had not had a normal pregnancy and her emergency surgery was performed to stop bleeding and save her life, her pregnancy was deemed worthy of disability benefits. This case allowed women with medical complications during pregnancy to be granted benefits and more protections, such as disability coverage for not just pregnancy, but also the amount of time it takes for recovery from complications.

California Federal Savings and Loan Association v. Guerra (1987) Lillian Garland worked as a receptionist for California Federal Savings and Loan Association for a few years as a receptionist when she became pregnant. She took pregnancy disability leave in January, and notified Cal. Fed. of her intent to return in April. On giving notice of her intent to return to work, she was informed that her job was now held by someone else and that there were not equivalent available positions for her. Upon filing a lawsuit, Cal. Fed. argued that the law was discriminatory towards men and violated Title VII of the Civil Rights Act of 1964 by giving women more rights than men, instead of equal rights. The Supreme Court held that because protection against pregnancy discrimination was law in California, Garland must be given her job back, but they held that nationally, women are not allowed "preferential treatment" due to pregnancy.

Rent-A-Center West, Inc. v. Jackson (2010) Natasha Jackson was the only woman employee working at Rent-A-Center when she became pregnant. She struggled with morning sickness and also was given a doctor's note restricting her from lifting more than 25 pounds, a task rarely assigned to her position. Her district manager put her on paid leave for two-weeks, but after learning of the doctor's note, told her she could not work until she had delivered her baby and that there was no guarantee of her job being there when she returned. Two months after her baby was born she tried to return to work with a doctor's note and was fired anyway. She filed a pregnancy discrimination case and then changed the complaint to arbitration; she lost her case after three years.

Arizanovska v. Wal-Mart Stores, Inc. (2012) Svetlana Arizanovska was working as a shelf stocker at Wal-Mart when she became pregnant, and her doctor told her not to lift more than 20 pounds. She was assigned light-duty work for a little while, but then was told there were no more light assignments available and she was directed to go back to regular work. While lifting, she began to bleed, and upon telling her boss she was told to go back to work, and later learned she had suffered a miscarriage. She became pregnant again 4 months later, and was given orders to lift no more than 10 pounds, but was cleared to work by her doctor. Wal-Mart again said they had no light-duty assignments for her, and put her on unpaid leave, then fired her. Arizanovska miscarried again, and presented the reason as stress due to unemployment. She lost her case both in district and appeals court.

These cases give background on what is and is not covered by amendments and acts currently in the U.S. Constitution. The major argument in most cases that lost in court was that providing benefits for pregnant workers gave women more benefits than men had, as pregnancy can not occur within a male body. This therefore shut down the cases being tried under the Fourteenth Amendment to the United States Constitution, as it requires "Equal Protection". Other cases show that pregnancies that are not "normal" or have complications, are covered by the PDA and disability, but normal pregnancies are not. Some cases, such as Rentzer v. Unemployment Ins. Appeals Bd. are examples of cases which actually changed or added to the PDA, while most of the others display their limitations.

== Critiques of the Pregnancy Discrimination Act ==
The act has received many critiques about what people are protected, and what is protected by the clause. Some critics say that the act protects employees in a way that is too focused on biology, and does not protect the social aspects of motherhood. That is, while employees would be protected by the PDA for missing work due to her pregnancy, they would not be protected if they had to miss work to care for their sick child.

Other critiques include the argument that the act does not take into consideration the social, cultural, and financial effects of having the capacity to become pregnant, even if one is not currently pregnant. This means that women are discriminated against in the workplace due to the fact that they could become pregnant, causing them to be given lower wages, fewer promotions, and less authority in the workplace. Critics note that because the PDA protects against discrimination "on the basis of pregnancy" that wage differences, lack of advancement, hiring, firing and other discriminatory acts towards women are due to their childbearing capacity, and should be protected by the PDA.

Some Liberal Feminists argue that asking for too much under the PDA would actually lead to unequal compensation, and would put pregnant workers in the position of losing benefits of the act all together. They argue that because pregnancy is considered a disability, asking for more disability leave for a pregnancy or complications after a pregnancy could extend the time considered equal to what non-pregnant individuals would take for disability leave, and put them in a position which would allow termination. These critics argue that special treatment in terms of benefits for an entire group would not be as beneficial as equal treatment. Since Liberal Feminists take an individualistic approach to feminist theory, focusing on women gaining and keeping equality through their own actions and choices, this critique does apply to many Liberal Feminists. However, another group of Liberal Feminists argue that this approach is too concerned with policy and not concerned enough with results for women, noting that this theory would not actually help pregnant workers at all, and perhaps put them more at risk for termination. This group of Liberal Feminists also states that the "extra" benefits that would be provided with the PDA would be putting women on equal ground with men, allowing them to be more equal competitors in their professional lives.

A Pluralist Radical Feminist critique of the PDA notes that pregnancy should not be considered a disability at all. They argue that the PDA classifying pregnancy as a disability is too reflective of a phallocentric view of pregnancy, as it refuses to treat pregnancy with its own model and forces it into the same system that men use when "disabled" even though they cannot experience this. They would argue that a body with the potential to become pregnant does not only have a chance of experiencing pregnancy, but also the unique conditions and complications that may come along with it, and that forcing pregnancy into the guidelines of disability can not fully provide pregnant workers with the protections they need.

Transgender exclusion is also a critique of the PDA. Transgender men who still have the capacity to become pregnant are often excluded from the protections of the act due to the language and scope of the protected class defined by the PDA. The PDA states that it protects: "women affected by pregnancy, childbirth, or related medical conditions" which leaves transgender men, and non-binary gender identities outside of the protected class. Many theorists and activists are pushing to change the language of the PDA to make sure that all gender identities will be protected.

Many feminists of all backgrounds argue that all of these issues could be avoided if the constitution were to include the Equal Rights Amendment (ERA). The ERA "was a proposed amendment to the United States Constitution designed to guarantee equal rights for women." It is argued that if the ERA were in place, men and women would have equal rights to work and family simultaneously, as sex equality would be a constitutional right without loopholes. Seeing as Constitutional Amendments and Acts currently do not fully protect workers from pregnancy discrimination, even those that are meant to give equal protections, such as Title XIV and Title VII, many believe the ERA would give protections to pregnant workers more easily. If the ERA were constituted in addition to the PDA, this would allow even more protections under the constitution for pregnant peoples. However, since the proposed amendment constrains only the actions of government and not private employers, how the amendment would bring about such a change remains to be seen.

== See also ==
- Pregnancy discrimination in the United States
- United States labor law
- Pregnant Workers Fairness Act
