= 2008 term United States Supreme Court opinions of John Paul Stevens =

The 2008 term of the Supreme Court of the United States began October 6, 2008, and concluded October 4, 2009. This was the thirty-fourth term of Associate Justice John Paul Stevens's tenure on the Court.
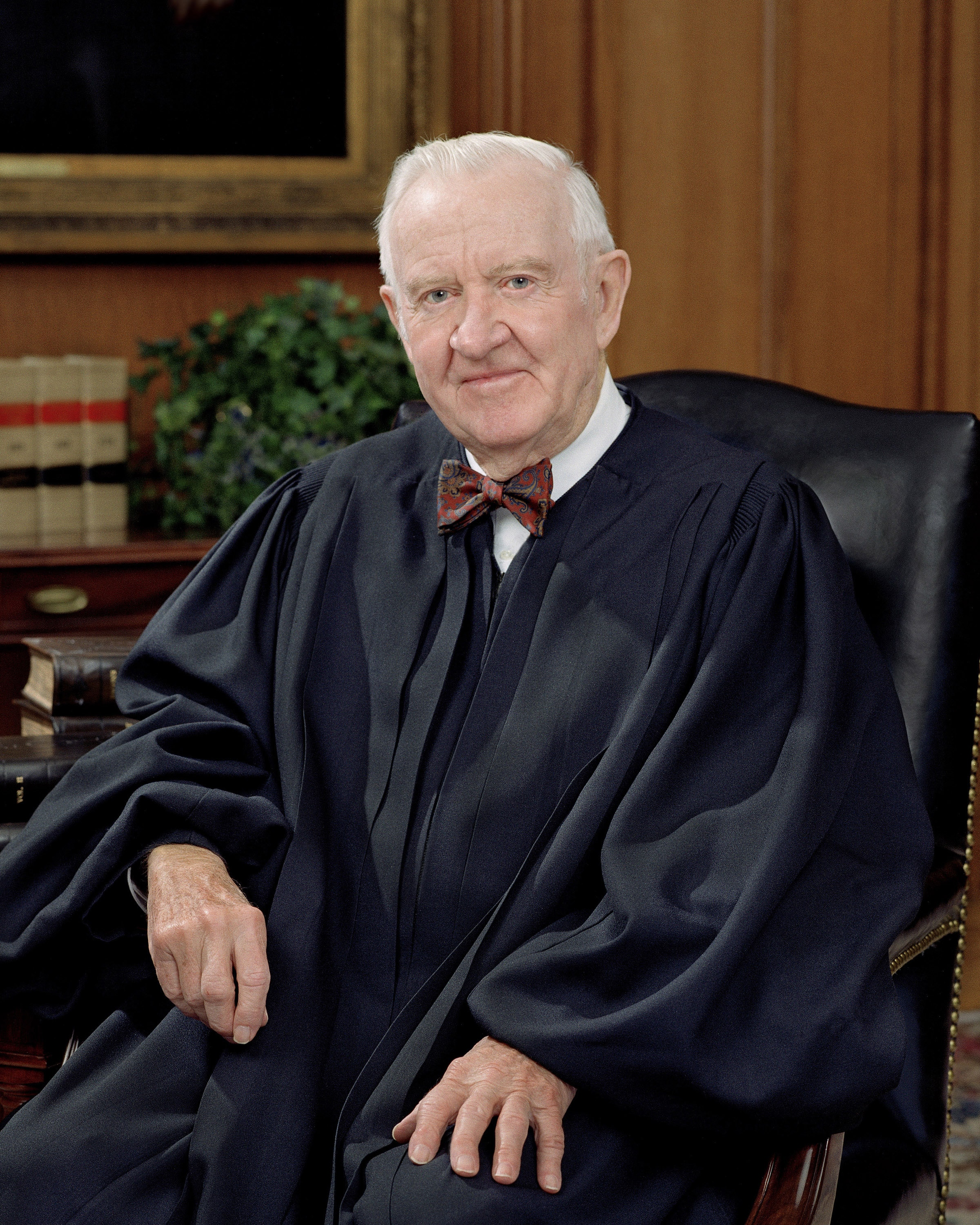

John Paul Stevens 2008 term statistics

9	Majority or plurality	5	Concurrence	3	Other
15	Dissent	2	Concurrence/dissent	Total =	34
Bench opinions = 29		Opinions relating to orders = 5		In-chambers opinions = 0
Unanimous opinions: 0		Most joined by: Ginsburg (19)		Least joined by: Scalia, Thomas, Alito (2)

Type	Case	Citation	Issues	Joined by	Other opinions
	Hedgpeth v. Pulido	557 U.S. 57 (2008)	Fourteenth Amendment • Due Process Clause • felony murder • erroneous jury instructions • harmless error	Souter, Ginsburg	per curiam
	Altria Group, Inc. v. Good	555 U.S. 70 (2008)	tobacco litigation • unfair trade practices • Federal Cigarette Labeling and Advertising Act • federal preemption	Kennedy, Souter, Ginsburg, Breyer	Thomas
	Ysursa v. Pocatello Ed. Assn.	555 U.S. 353 (2009)	First Amendment • public employee unions • state ban on payroll deductions for political activities		Roberts; Ginsburg; Breyer; Souter
	Carcieri v. Salazar	555 U.S. 379 (2009)	Indian Reorganization Act • legal status of Narragansett Tribe • authority of Secretary of the Interior to take land in trust		Thomas; Breyer; Souter
	Pleasant Grove City v. Summum	555 U.S. 460 (2009)	First Amendment • free speech • government speech • public forums	Ginsburg	Alito; Scalia; Souter; Breyer
	Negusie v. Holder	555 U.S. 511 (2009)	immigration law • Refugee Act of 1980 • persecutor bar for refugee applicants	Breyer	Kennedy; Scalia; Thomas
	Wyeth v. Levine	555 U.S. 555 (2009)	Food, Drug, and Cosmetic Act • FDA-approved pharmaceutical labeling • federal preemption • failure-to-warn of risks	Kennedy, Souter, Ginsburg, Breyer	Thomas; Breyer; Alito
	Walker v. Georgia	555 U.S. 979 (2008)	Eighth Amendment • death penalty • proportionality review		Thomas
Stevens filed a statement respecting the Court's denial of certiorari.
	Kelly v. California	555 U.S. 1020 (2008)	Eighth Amendment • death penalty • victim impact evidence		Breyer
Stevens filed a statement respecting the Court's denial of certiorari, in a case that involved the admissibility of "victim impact evidence" during the sentencing phase of a capital trial.
	Vail v. Stenson	555 U.S. 1065 (2008)	Eighth Amendment • death penalty • stay of execution pending constitutional litigation	Ginsburg	
Stevens concurred in the Court's stay of execution of a sentence of death.
	Harbison v. Bell	556 U.S. 180 (2009)	federally appointed counsel in state clemency proceedings • certificate of appealability	Kennedy, Souter, Ginsburg, Breyer	Roberts; Thomas; Scalia
	Entergy Corp. v. Riverkeeper, Inc.	556 U.S. 208 (2009)	Clean Water Act • environmental impact of power plant cooling water intake • national performance standards based on cost-benefit analysis	Souter, Ginsburg	Scalia; Breyer
	14 Penn Plaza LLC v. Pyett	556 U.S. 247 (2009)	Age Discrimination in Employment Act of 1967 • arbitration clause in collective bargaining agreement		Thomas; Souter
	Arizona v. Gant	556 U.S. 332 (2009)	Fourth Amendment • search incident to arrest • vehicle search	Scalia, Souter, Thomas, Ginsburg	Scalia; Breyer; Alito
	Cone v. Bell	556 U.S. 449 (2009)	Fourteenth Amendment • Due Process Clause • state suppression of mitigating evidence • adequate and independent state ground	Kennedy, Souter, Ginsburg, Breyer	Roberts; Alito; Thomas
	FCC v. Fox Television Stations, Inc.	556 U.S. 502 (2009)	Public Telecommunications Act of 1992 • indecency ban on broadcast television • fleeting expletives		Scalia; Kennedy; Thomas; Ginsburg; Breyer
	Dean v. United States	556 U.S. 568 (2009)	federal criminal law • mandatory additional sentence discharge of firearm during crime • proof of intent • rule of lenity		Roberts; Breyer
	Kansas v. Ventris	556 U.S. 586 (2009)	Sixth Amendment • admissibility of unconstitutionally elicited statement as impeachment evidence	Ginsburg	Scalia
	Burlington N. & S. F. R. Co. v. United States	556 U.S. 599 (2009)	Comprehensive Environmental Response, Compensation, and Liability Act • cleanup cost liability for arranger of hazardous waste disposal	Roberts, Scalia, Kennedy, Souter, Thomas, Breyer, Alito	Ginsburg
	Carlsbad Technology, Inc. v. HIF Bio, Inc.	556 U.S. 635 (2009)	appeal after removal to state court • supplemental jurisdiction		Thomas; Scalia; Breyer
	AT&T Corp. v. Hulteen	556 U.S. 701 (2009)	Pregnancy Discrimination Act • calculating pregnancy leave for pension plan accrual		Souter; Ginsburg
	Haywood v. Drown	556 U.S. 729 (2009)	Section 1983 • state limitation of liability against corrections officers • Supremacy Clause	Kennedy, Souter, Ginsburg, Breyer	Thomas
	Montejo v. Louisiana	556 U.S. 778 (2009)	Fifth Amendment • right against self-incrimination • police interrogation after invocation of right to counsel	Souter, Ginsburg; Breyer (in part)	Scalia; Alito; Breyer
	CSX Transp., Inc. v. Hensley	556 U.S. 838 (2009)	Federal Employers' Liability Act • asbestos litigation • jury instruction on fear-of-cancer damages		per curiam; Ginsburg
	Boyle v. United States	556 U.S. 938 (2009)	Racketeer Influenced and Corrupt Organizations Act • association-in-fact enterprise	Breyer	Alito
	Thompson v. McNeil	556 U.S. 1114 (2009)	Eighth Amendment • death penalty • substantial delay		Thomas; Breyer
Stevens filed a statement respecting the Court's denial of certiorari.
	Polar Tankers, Inc. v. City of Valdez	557 U.S. 1 (2009)	Tonnage Clause • local property tax on vessels	Souter	Breyer; Roberts; Alito
	District Attorney's Office for Third Judicial Dist. v. Osborne	557 U.S. 52 (2009)	Due Process Clause • postconviction access to state evidence for DNA testing • substantive due process	Ginsburg, Breyer; Souter (in part)	Roberts; Alito; Souter
	Yeager v. United States	557 U.S. 110 (2009)	Double Jeopardy Clause • issue preclusion • inconsistency between acquittal and hung jury	Roberts, Souter, Ginsburg, Breyer; Kennedy (in part)	Kennedy; Scalia; Alito
	Travelers Indemnity Co. v. Bailey	557 U.S. 137 (2009)	bankruptcy law • enjoined claims	Ginsburg	Souter
	Gross v. FBL Financial Services, Inc.	557 U.S. 167 (2009)	Age Discrimination in Employment Act of 1967 • disparate treatment claim • but-for causation • burden of persuasion	Souter, Ginsburg, Breyer	Thomas; Breyer
	Forest Grove School Dist. v. T. A.	557 U.S. 230 (2009)	Individuals with Disabilities Education Act • reimbursement for private special education services	Roberts, Kennedy, Ginsburg, Breyer, Alito	Souter
	Safford Unified School District v. Redding	557 U.S. 364 (2009)	Fourth Amendment • strip search of public school student for contraband	Ginsburg	Souter; Thomas; Ginsburg
	In re Davis	557 U.S. 952 (2009)	habeas corpus	Ginsburg, Breyer	Scalia
Stevens concurred in the Court's order that a district court hear and determine a habeas corpus petition, writing to critique Scalia's dissent.
