= 2008 term United States Supreme Court opinions of Stephen Breyer =

The 2008 term of the Supreme Court of the United States began October 6, 2008, and concluded October 4, 2009. This was the fifteenth term of Associate Justice Stephen Breyer's tenure on the Court.
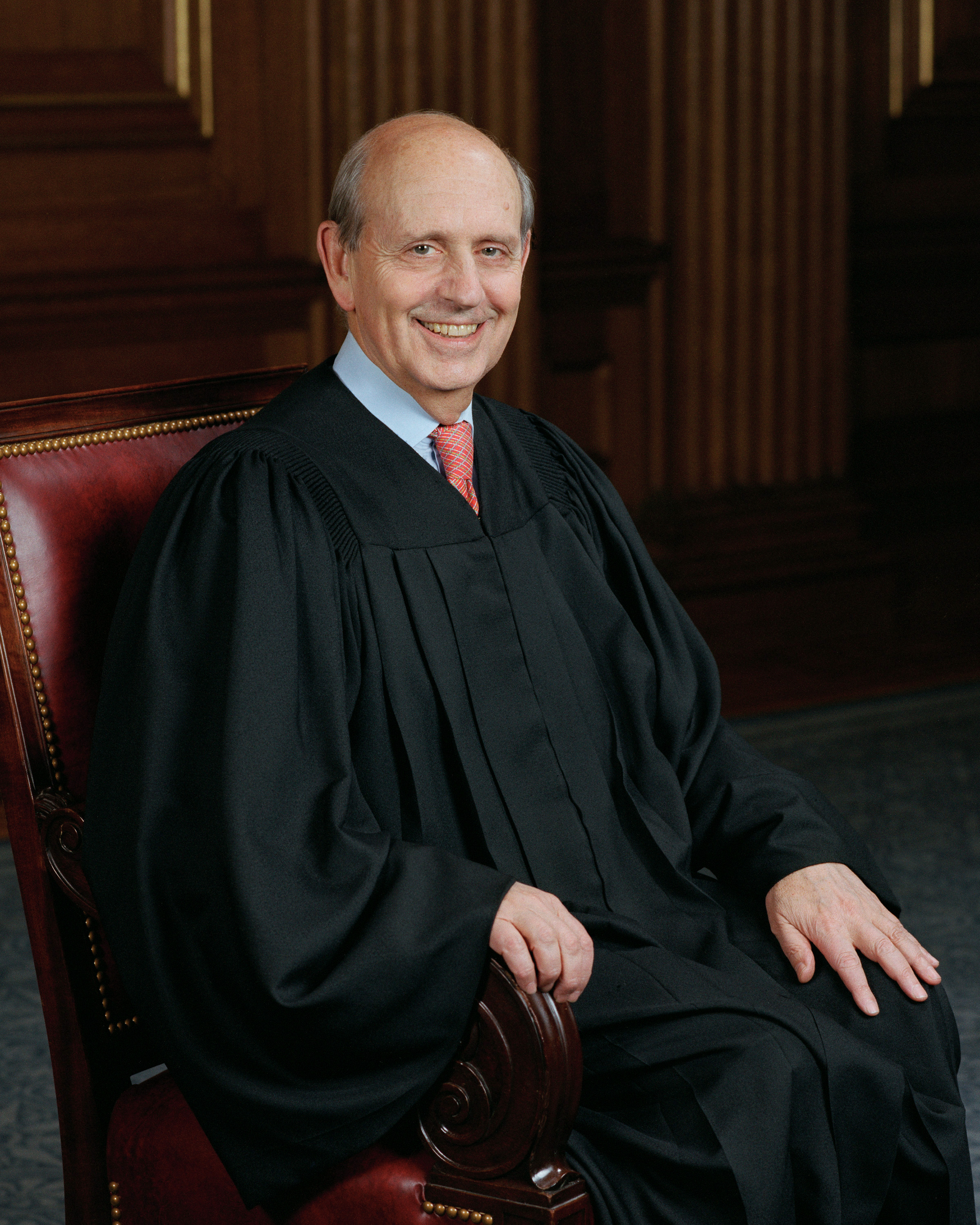

Stephen Breyer 2008 term statistics

8	Majority or plurality	7	Concurrence	1	Other
13	Dissent	3	Concurrence/dissent	Total =	32
Bench opinions = 29		Opinions relating to orders = 2		In-chambers opinions = 1
Unanimous opinions: 3		Most joined by: Souter (13)		Least joined by: Thomas (5)

Type	Case	Citation	Issues	Joined by	Other opinions
	Winter v. Natural Resources Defense Council, Inc.	555 U.S. 7 (2008)	National Environmental Policy Act • impact of naval sonar testing on marine mammals • environmental impact statements	Stevens (in part)	Roberts; Ginsburg
	Chambers v. United States	555 U.S. 122 (2009)	Armed Career Criminal Act • definition of "violent felony"	Roberts, Stevens, Scalia, Kennedy, Souter, Ginsburg	Alito
	Herring v. United States	555 U.S. 135 (2009)	Fourth Amendment • exclusionary rule • effect of police negligence on search	Souter	Roberts; Ginsburg
	Locke v. Karass	555 U.S. 207 (2009)	First Amendment • public employee union fees imposed on nonmembers	Unanimous	Alito
	Van de Kamp v. Goldstein	555 U.S. 335 (2009)	Section 1983 • failure to disclose impeachment evidence of state witnesses • prosecutorial immunity	Unanimous	
	Nelson v. United States	555 U.S. 350 (2009)	United States Sentencing Guidelines • confession of error	Alito	per curiam
	Ysursa v. Pocatello Ed. Assn.	555 U.S. 353 (2009)	First Amendment • public employee unions • state ban on payroll deductions for political activities		Roberts; Ginsburg; Stevens; Souter
	Carcieri v. Salazar	555 U.S. 379 (2009)	Indian Reorganization Act • legal status of Narragansett Tribe • authority of Secretary of the Interior to take land in trust		Thomas; Souter; Stevens
	Pacific Bell Telephone Co. v. linkLine Communications, Inc.	555 U.S. 438 (2009)	antitrust law • Sherman Antitrust Act • predatory pricing • wholesale DSL service	Stevens, Souter, Ginsburg	Roberts
	Pleasant Grove City v. Summum	555 U.S. 460 (2009)	First Amendment • free speech • government speech • public forums		Alito; Stevens; Scalia; Souter
	Summers v. Earth Island Institute	555 U.S. 488 (2009)	Forest Service Decisionmaking and Appeals Reform Act • regulatory exceptions to notice and comment procedures • Article III • standing	Stevens, Souter, Ginsburg	Scalia; Kennedy
	Wyeth v. Levine	555 U.S. 555 (2009)	Food, Drug, and Cosmetic Act • FDA-approved pharmaceutical labeling • federal preemption • failure-to-warn of risks		Stevens; Thomas; Alito
	Kelly v. California	555 U.S. 1020 (2008)	Due Process Clause • Eighth Amendment • death penalty • victim impact evidence		Stevens
Breyer dissented from the Court's denial of certiorari, in a case that involved the admissibility of "victim impact evidence" during the sentencing phase of a capital trial.
	Bartlett v. Strickland	556 U.S. 1 (2009)	Voting Rights Act of 1965 • legislative redistricting • vote dilution		Kennedy; Thomas; Souter; Ginsburg
	Vermont v. Brillon	556 U.S. 81 (2009)	Sixth Amendment • Speedy Trial Clause • delay attributable to court-appointed defense counsel	Stevens	Ginsburg
	Entergy Corp. v. Riverkeeper, Inc.	556 U.S. 208 (2009)	Clean Water Act • environmental impact of power plant cooling water intake • national performance standards based on cost-benefit analysis		Scalia; Stevens
	Arizona v. Gant	556 U.S. 332 (2009)	Fourth Amendment • search incident to arrest • vehicle search		Stevens; Scalia; Alito
	Ministry of Defense and Support for Armed Forces of Islamic Republic of Iran v. Elahi	556 U.S. 36 (2009)	attachment to judgment in favor of foreign government • Terrorism Risk Insurance Act of 2002 • Victims of Trafficking and Violence Protection Act of 2000	Roberts, Stevens, Scalia, Thomas, Alito; Kennedy, Souter, Ginsburg (in part)	Kennedy
	Shinseki v. Sanders	556 U.S. 396 (2009)	denial of benefits by Department of Veterans Affairs • failure to give notice of required evidence • harmless error	Roberts, Scalia, Kennedy, Thomas, Alito	Souter
	FCC v. Fox Television Stations, Inc.	556 U.S. 502 (2009)	Public Telecommunications Act of 1992 • indecency ban on broadcast television • fleeting expletives	Stevens, Souter, Ginsburg	Scalia; Kennedy; Thomas; Stevens; Ginsburg
	Dean v. United States	556 U.S. 568 (2009)	federal criminal law • mandatory additional sentence discharge of firearm during crime • proof of intent • rule of lenity		Roberts; Stevens
	Carlsbad Technology, Inc. v. HIF Bio, Inc.	556 U.S. 635 (2009)	appeal after removal to state court • supplemental jurisdiction	Souter	Thomas; Stevens; Scalia
	Flores-Figueroa v. United States	556 U.S. 646 (2009)	federal criminal law • identity theft • knowing use of another person's identification	Roberts, Stevens, Kennedy, Souter, Ginsburg	Scalia; Alito
	Ashcroft v. Iqbal	556 U.S. 662 (2009)	post-9/11 detention • qualified immunity • collateral order doctrine • Federal Rules of Civil Procedure • sufficiency of pleadings in discrimination case		Kennedy; Souter
	Montejo v. Louisiana	556 U.S. 778 (2009)	Fifth Amendment • right against self-incrimination • police interrogation after invocation of right to counsel		Scalia; Alito; Stevens
	Thompson v. McNeil	556 U.S. 1114 (2009)	Eighth Amendment • death penalty • substantial delay		Stevens; Thomas
Breyer dissented from the Court's denial of certiorari.
	Polar Tankers, Inc. v. City of Valdez	557 U.S. 1 (2009)	Tonnage Clause • local property tax on vessels	Scalia, Kennedy, Ginsburg; Alito (in part)	Roberts; Alito; Stevens
	Nijhawan v. Holder	557 U.S. 29 (2009)	immigration law • removal after conviction of aggravated felony • threshold for monetary loss caused by crime	Unanimous	
	Gross v. FBL Financial Services, Inc.	557 U.S. 167 (2009)	Age Discrimination in Employment Act of 1967 • disparate treatment claim • but-for causation • burden of persuasion	Souter, Ginsburg	Thomas; Stevens
	Coeur Alaska, Inc. v. Southeast Alaska Conservation Council	557 U.S. 261 (2009)	Clean Water Act • Army Corps of Engineers authority to issue slurry discharge permit		Kennedy; Scalia; Ginsburg
	Horne v. Flores	557 U.S. 433 (2009)	Equal Educational Opportunities Act of 1974 • state funding of English language instruction • Article III • standing • Federal Rules of Civil Procedure • relief from judgment based on changed circumstances • No Child Left Behind Act	Stevens, Souter, Ginsburg	Alito
	O'Brien v. O'Laughlin	557 U.S. 1301 (2009)	habeas corpus • bail pending appeal		
Breyer denied the government's application for a stay of the grant of a habeas corpus petition.
