= 2008 term United States Supreme Court opinions of Antonin Scalia =

The 2008 term of the Supreme Court of the United States began October 6, 2008, and concluded October 4, 2009. This was the twenty-third term of Associate Justice Antonin Scalia's tenure on the Court.
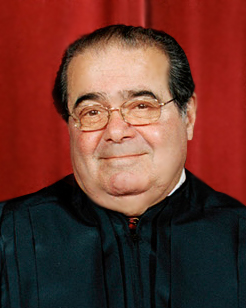

Antonin Scalia 2008 term statistics

11	Majority or plurality	7	Concurrence	0	Other
6	Dissent	1	Concurrence/dissent	Total =	25
Bench opinions = 22		Opinions relating to orders = 3		In-chambers opinions = 0
Unanimous opinions: 2		Most joined by: Thomas (14)		Least joined by: Stevens (4)

Type	Case	Citation	Issues	Joined by	Other opinions
	Oregon v. Ice	555 U.S. 160 (2009)	Sixth Amendment • right to jury trial • imposition of consecutive sentences for multiple offenses	Roberts, Souter, Thomas	Ginsburg
	Pleasant Grove City v. Summum	555 U.S. 460 (2009)	First Amendment • free speech • government speech • public forums	Thomas	Alito; Stevens; Souter; Breyer
	Summers v. Earth Island Institute	555 U.S. 488 (2009)	Forest Service Decisionmaking and Appeals Reform Act • regulatory exceptions to notice and comment procedures • Article III • standing	Roberts, Kennedy, Thomas, Alito	Kennedy; Breyer
	Negusie v. Holder	555 U.S. 511 (2009)	immigration law • Refugee Act of 1980 • persecutor bar for refugee applicants	Alito	Kennedy; Stevens; Thomas
	Marlowe v. United States	555 U.S. 963 (2008)	Sixth Amendment • right to trial by jury • United States Sentencing Guidelines		
Scalia dissented from the Court's denial of certiorari.
	Sorich v. United States	555 U.S. 1204 (2009)	honest services fraud		
Scalia dissented from the Court's denial of certiorari.
	Puckett v. United States	556 U.S. 129 (2009)	Federal Rules of Criminal Procedure • plain-error standard for unpreserved claims of error • breach of plea agreement	Roberts, Kennedy, Thomas, Ginsburg, Breyer, Alito	Souter
	Harbison v. Bell	556 U.S. 180 (2009)	federally appointed counsel in state clemency proceedings • certificate of appealability		Stevens; Roberts; Thomas
	Entergy Corp. v. Riverkeeper, Inc.	556 U.S. 208 (2009)	Clean Water Act • environmental impact of power plant cooling water intake • national performance standards based on cost-benefit analysis	Roberts, Kennedy, Thomas, Alito	Breyer; Stevens
	United States v. Navajo Nation	556 U.S. 287 (2009)	Navajo Nation • Navajo-Hopi Rehabilitation Act of 1950 • Surface Mining Control and Reclamation Act of 1977 • failure of Secretary of Interior to promptly approve tribal coal lease royalty rate increase	Unanimous	Souter
	Arizona v. Gant	556 U.S. 332 (2009)	Fourth Amendment • search incident to arrest • vehicle search		Stevens; Breyer; Alito
	FCC v. Fox Television Stations, Inc.	556 U.S. 502 (2009)	Public Telecommunications Act of 1992 • indecency ban on broadcast television • fleeting expletives	Roberts, Thomas, Alito; Kennedy (in part)	Kennedy; Thomas; Stevens; Ginsburg; Breyer
	Kansas v. Ventris	556 U.S. 586 (2009)	Sixth Amendment • admissibility of unconstitutionally elicited statement as impeachment evidence	Roberts, Kennedy, Souter, Thomas, Breyer, Alito	Stevens
	Arthur Andersen LLP v. Carlisle	556 U.S. 624 (2009)	Federal Arbitration Act • appealability of order denying stay of arbitrable action	Kennedy, Thomas, Ginsburg, Breyer, Alito	Souter
	Carlsbad Technology, Inc. v. HIF Bio, Inc.	556 U.S. 635 (2009)	appeal after removal to state court • supplemental jurisdiction		Thomas; Stevens; Breyer
	Flores-Figueroa v. United States	556 U.S. 646 (2009)	federal criminal law • identity theft • knowing use of another person's identification	Thomas	Breyer; Alito
	Montejo v. Louisiana	556 U.S. 778 (2009)	Fifth Amendment • right against self-incrimination • police interrogation after invocation of right to counsel	Roberts, Kennedy, Thomas, Alito	Alito; Stevens; Breyer
	Republic of Iraq v. Beaty	556 U.S. 848 (2009)	Iraq–United States relations • Foreign Sovereign Immunities Act of 1976 • Emergency Wartime Supplemental Appropriations Act • state-sponsored terrorism	Unanimous	
	Caperton v. A. T. Massey Coal Co.	556 U.S. 868 (2009)	Due Process Clause • recusal • judicial campaign contributions from litigant		Kennedy; Roberts
	Yeager v. United States	557 U.S. 110 (2009)	Double Jeopardy Clause • issue preclusion • inconsistency between acquittal and hung jury	Thomas, Alito	Stevens; Kennedy; Alito
	Coeur Alaska, Inc. v. Southeast Alaska Conservation Council	557 U.S. 261 (2009)	Clean Water Act • Army Corps of Engineers authority to issue slurry discharge permit		Kennedy; Breyer; Ginsburg
	Melendez-Diaz v. Massachusetts	557 U.S. 305 (2009)	Sixth Amendment • Confrontation Clause • forensic analyst affidavits	Stevens, Souter, Thomas, Ginsburg	Thomas; Kennedy
	Cuomo v. Clearing House Assn., L. L. C.	557 U.S. 519 (2009)	National Banking Act • fair-lending laws • federal preemption	Stevens, Souter, Ginsburg, Breyer	Thomas
	Ricci v. DeStefano	557 U.S. 557 (2009)	Title VII • disparate impact • exams used for employee promotions		Kennedy; Alito; Ginsburg
	In re Davis	557 U.S. 952 (2009)	habeas corpus	Thomas	Stevens
Scalia dissented from the Court's order that a district court hear and determine a habeas corpus petition.
