= 2008 term United States Supreme Court opinions of Clarence Thomas =

The 2008 term of the Supreme Court of the United States began October 6, 2008, and concluded October 4, 2009. This was the eighteenth term of Associate Justice Clarence Thomas's tenure on the Court.
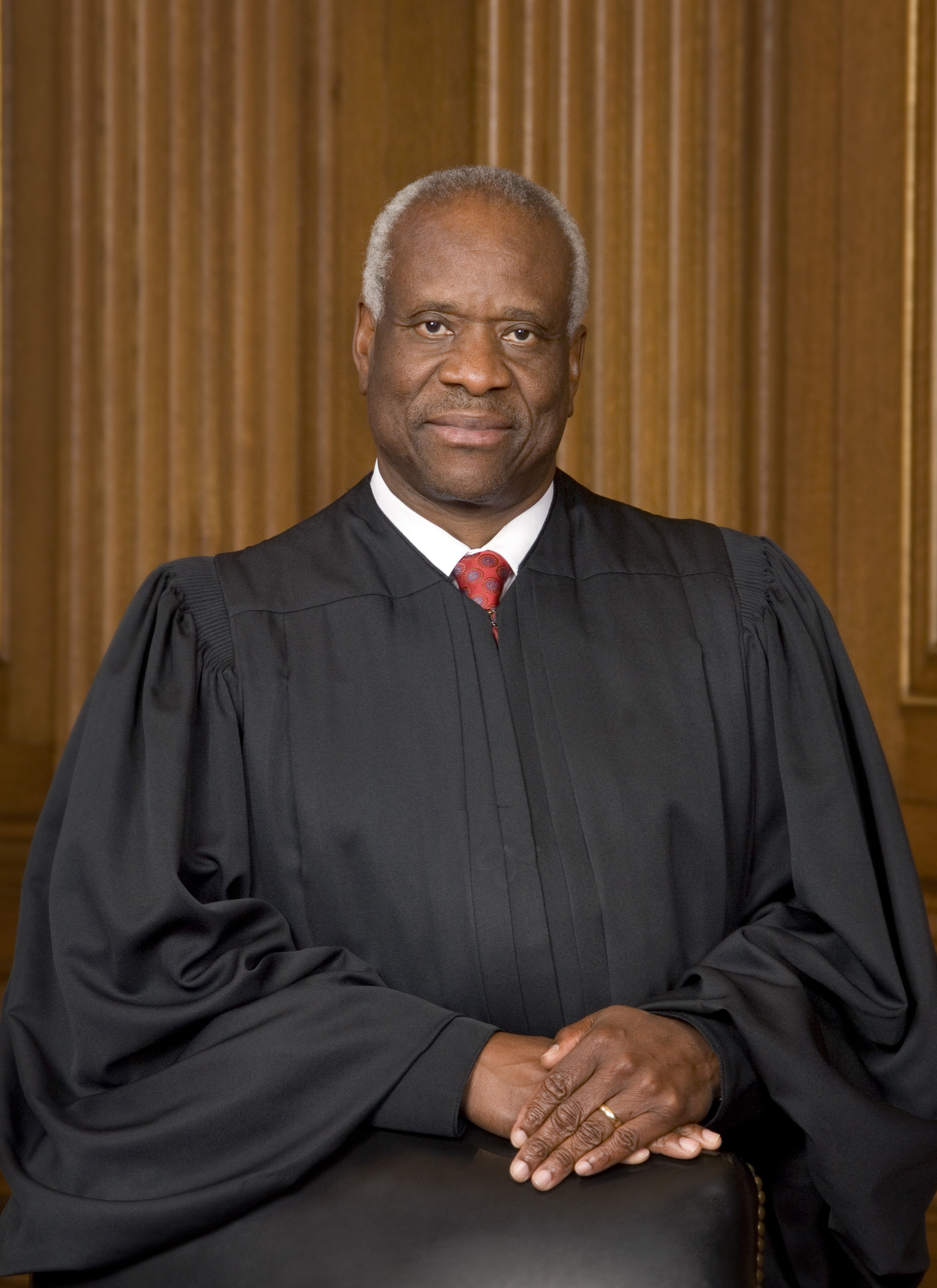

Clarence Thomas 2008 term statistics

9	Majority or plurality	7	Concurrence	0	Other
4	Dissent	3	Concurrence/dissent	Total =	23
Bench opinions = 21		Opinions relating to orders = 2		In-chambers opinions = 0
Unanimous opinions: 3		Most joined by: Scalia (10 in full, 2 in part)		Least joined by: Souter, Ginsburg (4 in full, 1 in part)

Type	Case	Citation	Issues	Joined by	Other opinions
	Altria Group, Inc. v. Good	555 U.S. 70 (2008)	tobacco litigation • unfair trade practices • Federal Cigarette Labeling and Advertising Act • federal preemption	Roberts, Scalia, Alito	Stevens
	Jimenez v. Quarterman	555 U.S. 113 (2009)	habeas corpus • Antiterrorism and Effective Death Penalty Act of 1996 • finality of conviction pending out-of-time appeal	Unanimous	
	Waddington v. Sarausad	555 U.S. 179 (2009)	habeas corpus • Antiterrorism and Effective Death Penalty Act of 1996 • accomplice liability	Roberts, Scalia, Kennedy, Breyer, Alito	Souter
	Carcieri v. Salazar	555 U.S. 379 (2009)	Indian Reorganization Act • legal status of Narragansett Tribe • authority of Secretary of the Interior to take land in trust	Roberts, Scalia, Kennedy, Alito	Breyer; Souter; Stevens
	Negusie v. Holder	555 U.S. 511 (2009)	immigration law • Refugee Act of 1980 • persecutor bar for refugee applicants		Kennedy; Scalia; Stevens
	Wyeth v. Levine	555 U.S. 555 (2009)	Food, Drug, and Cosmetic Act • FDA-approved pharmaceutical labeling • federal preemption • failure-to-warn of risks		Stevens; Breyer; Alito
	Walker v. Georgia	555 U.S. 979 (2008)	Eighth Amendment • death penalty • proportionality review		Stevens
Thomas concurred in the Court's denial of certiorari.
	Bartlett v. Strickland	556 U.S. 1 (2009)	Voting Rights Act of 1965 • legislative redistricting • vote dilution	Scalia	Kennedy; Souter; Ginsburg; Breyer
	Knowles v. Mirzayance	556 U.S. 111 (2009)	Sixth Amendment • ineffective assistance of counsel • withdrawal of not guilty by reason of insanity plea	Roberts, Stevens, Kennedy, Breyer, Alito; Scalia, Souter, Ginsburg (in part)	
	Harbison v. Bell	556 U.S. 180 (2009)	federally appointed counsel in state clemency proceedings • certificate of appealability		Stevens; Roberts; Scalia
	14 Penn Plaza LLC v. Pyett	556 U.S. 247 (2009)	Age Discrimination in Employment Act of 1967 • arbitration clause in collective bargaining agreement	Roberts, Scalia, Kennedy, Alito	Stevens; Souter
	Cone v. Bell	556 U.S. 449 (2009)	Fourteenth Amendment • Due Process Clause • state suppression of mitigating evidence • adequate and independent state ground	Scalia	Stevens; Roberts; Alito
	FCC v. Fox Television Stations, Inc.	556 U.S. 502 (2009)	Public Telecommunications Act of 1992 • indecency ban on broadcast television • fleeting expletives		Scalia; Kennedy; Stevens; Ginsburg; Breyer
	Carlsbad Technology, Inc. v. HIF Bio, Inc.	556 U.S. 635 (2009)	appeal after removal to state court • supplemental jurisdiction	Unanimous	Stevens; Scalia; Breyer
	Haywood v. Drown	556 U.S. 729 (2009)	Section 1983 • state limitation of liability against corrections officers • Supremacy Clause	Roberts, Scalia, Alito (in part)	Stevens
	United States ex rel. Eisenstein v. City of New York	556 U.S. 928 (2009)	False Claims Act • qui tam • Federal Rules of Appellate Procedure • status of United States when not intervening • timeliness of appeal	Unanimous	
	Thompson v. McNeil	556 U.S. 1114 (2009)	Eighth Amendment • death penalty • substantial delay		Stevens; Breyer
Thomas concurred in the Court's denial of certiorari.
	Gross v. FBL Financial Services, Inc.	557 U.S. 167 (2009)	Age Discrimination in Employment Act of 1967 • disparate treatment claim • but-for causation • burden of persuasion	Roberts, Scalia, Kennedy, Alito	Stevens; Breyer
	Northwest Austin Municipal Util. Dist. No. One v. Holder	557 U.S. 193 (2009)	Voting Rights Act of 1965 • preclearance • eligibility of utility district for bailout provision		Roberts
	Melendez-Diaz v. Massachusetts	557 U.S. 305 (2009)	Sixth Amendment • Confrontation Clause • forensic analyst affidavits		Scalia; Kennedy
	Safford Unified School District v. Redding	557 U.S. 364 (2009)	Fourth Amendment • strip search of public school student for contraband		Souter; Stevens; Ginsburg
	Atlantic Sounding Co. v. Townsend	557 U.S. 404 (2009)	maritime law • Jones Act • punitive damages	Stevens, Souter, Ginsburg, Breyer	Alito
	Cuomo v. Clearing House Assn., L. L. C.	557 U.S. 519 (2009)	National Banking Act • fair-lending laws • federal preemption	Roberts, Kennedy, Alito	Scalia
