= 2008 term United States Supreme Court opinions of Samuel Alito =

The 2008 term of the Supreme Court of the United States began October 6, 2008, and concluded October 4, 2009. This was the fourth term of Associate Justice Samuel Alito's tenure on the Court.
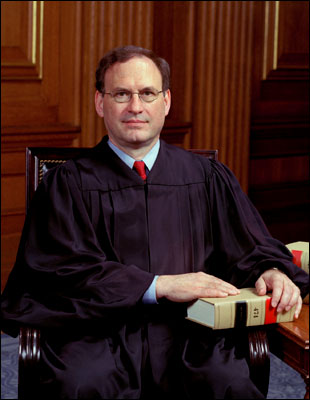

Samuel Alito 2008 term statistics

| 7 | Majority or plurality | 8 | Concurrence | 0 | Other |
| 8 | Dissent | 1 | Concurrence/dissent | Total = | 24 |
| Bench opinions = 22 | | Opinions relating to orders = 2 | | In-chambers opinions = 0 |
| Unanimous opinions: 4 | | Most joined by: Thomas (14) | | Least joined by: Stevens, Souter (5) |

| Type | Case | Citation | Issues | Joined by | Other opinions |
|---|---|---|---|---|---|
| | Chambers v. United States | 555 U.S. 122 (2009) | Armed Career Criminal Act • definition of "violent felony" | Thomas | Breyer |
| | Locke v. Karass | 555 U.S. 207 (2009) | First Amendment • public employee union fees imposed on nonmembers | Roberts, Scalia | Breyer |
| | Pearson v. Callahan | 555 U.S. 223 (2009) | qualified immunity • Fourth Amendment • consent-once-removed doctrine | Unanimous | |
| | Fitzgerald v. Barnstable School Comm. | 555 U.S. 246 (2009) | Fourteenth Amendment • Equal Protection Clause • sex discrimination • Title IX • section 1983 | Unanimous | |
| | Crawford v. Nashville | 555 U.S. 271 (2009) | Title VII • antiretaliation provision | Thomas | Souter |
| | Pleasant Grove City v. Summum | 555 U.S. 460 (2009) | First Amendment • free speech • government speech • public forums | Roberts, Stevens, Scalia, Kennedy, Thomas, Ginsburg, Breyer | Stevens; Scalia; Souter; Breyer |
| | Wyeth v. Levine | 555 U.S. 555 (2009) | Food, Drug, and Cosmetic Act • FDA-approved pharmaceutical labeling • federal preemption • failure-to-warn of risks | Roberts, Scalia | Stevens; Thomas; Breyer |
| | Kansas v. Colorado | 556 U.S. 98 (2009) | original jurisdiction • award of expert witness attendance fees • Arkansas River Compact | Unanimous | Roberts |
| | Hawaii v. Office of Hawaiian Affairs | 556 U.S. 163 (2009) | Hawaii Admission Act • Apology Resolution • disposition of land ceded to State upon admission to Union | Unanimous | |
| | Corley v. United States | 556 U.S. 303 (2009) | confession after unreasonable delay • Federal Rules of Criminal Procedure • voluntariness of confession | Roberts, Scalia, Thomas | Souter |
| | Arizona v. Gant | 556 U.S. 332 (2009) | Fourth Amendment • search incident to arrest • vehicle search | Roberts, Kennedy; Breyer (in part) | Stevens; Scalia; Breyer |
| | Nken v. Holder | 556 U.S. 418 (2009) | immigration law • Illegal Immigration Reform and Immigrant Responsibility Act of 1996 • stay of removal order | Thomas | Roberts; Kennedy |
| | Cone v. Bell | 556 U.S. 449 (2009) | Fourteenth Amendment • Due Process Clause • state suppression of mitigating evidence • adequate and independent state ground | | Stevens; Roberts; Thomas |
| | Flores-Figueroa v. United States | 556 U.S. 646 (2009) | federal criminal law • identity theft • knowing use of another person's identification | | Breyer; Scalia |
| | Montejo v. Louisiana | 556 U.S. 778 (2009) | Fifth Amendment • right against self-incrimination • police interrogation after invocation of right to counsel | Kennedy | Scalia; Stevens; Breyer |
| | Boyle v. United States | 556 U.S. 938 (2009) | Racketeer Influenced and Corrupt Organizations Act • association-in-fact enterprise | Roberts, Scalia, Kennedy, Souter, Thomas, Ginsburg | Stevens |
| | Megginson v. United States | 556 U.S. 1230 (2009) | Fourth Amendment • search incident to arrest • vehicle search | | |
Alito dissented from the Court's summary vacatur and remand.
| | Grooms v. United States | 556 U.S. 1231 (2009) | Fourth Amendment • search incident to arrest • vehicle search | | |
Alito dissented from the Court's summary vacatur and remand.
| | Polar Tankers, Inc. v. City of Valdez | 557 U.S. 1 (2009) | Tonnage Clause • local property tax on vessels | | Breyer; Roberts; Stevens |
| | District Attorney's Office for Third Judicial Dist. v. Osborne | 557 U.S. 52 (2009) | Due Process Clause • postconviction access to state evidence for DNA testing • substantive due process | Kennedy; Thomas (in part) | Roberts; Stevens; Souter |
| | Yeager v. United States | 557 U.S. 110 (2009) | Double Jeopardy Clause • issue preclusion • inconsistency between acquittal and hung jury | Scalia, Thomas | Stevens; Kennedy; Scalia |
| | Atlantic Sounding Co. v. Townsend | 557 U.S. 404 (2009) | maritime law • Jones Act • punitive damages | Roberts, Scalia, Kennedy | Thomas |
| | Horne v. Flores | 557 U.S. 433 (2009) | Equal Educational Opportunities Act of 1974 • state funding of English language instruction • Article III • standing • Federal Rules of Civil Procedure • relief from judgment based on changed circumstances • No Child Left Behind Act | Roberts, Scalia, Kennedy, Thomas | Breyer |
| | Ricci v. DeStefano | 557 U.S. 557 (2009) | Title VII • disparate impact • exams used for employee promotions | Scalia, Thomas | Kennedy; Scalia; Ginsburg |
