= 2008 term United States Supreme Court opinions of John Roberts =

Supreme Court opinions on 2008 John Roberts term

The 2008 term of the Supreme Court of the United States began October 6, 2008, and concluded October 4, 2009. This was the fourth term of Chief Justice John Roberts's tenure on the Court.
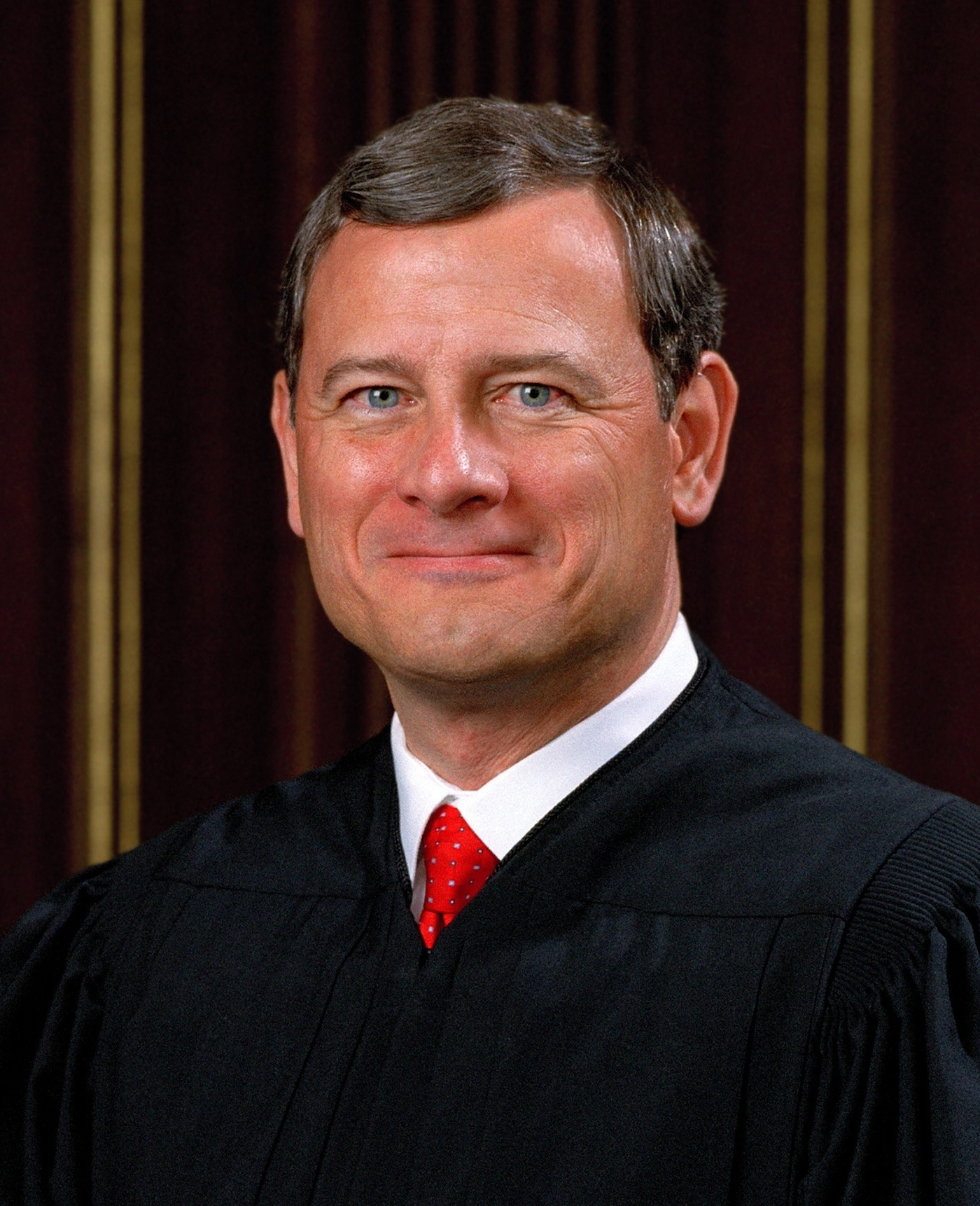

John Roberts 2008 term statistics

8	Majority or plurality	4	Concurrence	0	Other
4	Dissent	2	Concurrence/dissent	Total =	18
Bench opinions = 17		Opinions relating to orders = 1		In-chambers opinions = 0
Unanimous opinions: 0		Most joined by: Scalia, Alito (11)		Least joined by: Stevens, Breyer (3)

Type	Case	Citation	Issues	Joined by	Other opinions
	Winter v. Natural Resources Defense Council, Inc.	555 U.S. 7 (2008)	National Environmental Policy Act • impact of naval sonar testing on marine mammals • environmental impact statements	Scalia, Kennedy, Thomas, Alito	Breyer; Ginsburg
	Herring v. United States	555 U.S. 135 (2009)	Fourth Amendment • exclusionary rule • effect of police negligence on search	Scalia, Kennedy, Thomas, Alito	Ginsburg; Breyer
	Spears v. United States	555 U.S. 261 (2009)	Federal Sentencing Guidelines • crack/powder cocaine sentencing disparity	Alito	per curiam
Roberts dissented from the Court's per curiam opinion.
	Ysursa v. Pocatello Ed. Assn.	555 U.S. 353 (2009)	First Amendment • public employee unions • state ban on payroll deductions for political activities	Scalia, Kennedy, Thomas, Alito; Ginsburg (in part)	Ginsburg; Breyer; Stevens; Souter
	United States v. Hayes	555 U.S. 415 (2009)	Gun Control Act of 1968 • domestic violence predicate offense	Scalia	Ginsburg
	Pacific Bell Telephone Co. v. linkLine Communications, Inc.	555 U.S. 438 (2009)	antitrust law • Sherman Antitrust Act • predatory pricing • wholesale DSL service	Scalia, Kennedy, Thomas, Alito	Breyer
	Pennsylvania v. Dunlap	555 U.S. 964 (2008)	Fourth Amendment • probable cause	Kennedy	
Roberts dissented from the Court's denial of certiorari.
	Vaden v. Discover Bank	556 U.S. 49 (2009)	Federal Arbitration Act • petition in federal court to compel arbitration • federal question jurisdiction	Stevens, Breyer, Alito	Ginsburg
	Kansas v. Colorado	556 U.S. 98 (2009)	Article III • original jurisdiction • award of expert witness attendance fees • Arkansas River Compact	Souter	Alito
	Harbison v. Bell	556 U.S. 180 (2009)	federally appointed counsel in state clemency proceedings • certificate of appealability		Stevens; Thomas; Scalia
	Nken v. Holder	556 U.S. 418 (2009)	immigration law • Illegal Immigration Reform and Immigrant Responsibility Act of 1996 • stay of removal order	Stevens, Scalia, Kennedy, Souter, Ginsburg, Breyer	Kennedy; Alito
	Cone v. Bell	556 U.S. 449 (2009)	Fourteenth Amendment • Due Process Clause • state suppression of mitigating evidence • adequate and independent state ground		Stevens; Alito; Thomas
	Dean v. United States	556 U.S. 568 (2009)	federal criminal law • mandatory additional sentence discharge of firearm during crime • proof of intent • rule of lenity	Scalia, Kennedy, Souter, Thomas, Ginsburg, Alito	Stevens; Breyer
	Caperton v. A. T. Massey Coal Co.	556 U.S. 868 (2009)	Due Process Clause • recusal • judicial campaign contributions from litigant	Scalia, Thomas, Alito	Kennedy; Scalia
	United States v. Denedo	556 U.S. 904 (2009)	Uniform Code of Military Justice • coram nobis • All Writs Act	Scalia, Thomas, Alito	Kennedy
	Polar Tankers, Inc. v. City of Valdez	557 U.S. 1 (2009)	Tonnage Clause • local property tax on vessels	Thomas	Breyer; Alito; Stevens
	District Attorney's Office for Third Judicial Dist. v. Osborne	557 U.S. 52 (2009)	Due Process Clause • postconviction access to state evidence for DNA testing • substantive due process	Scalia, Kennedy, Thomas, Alito	Alito; Stevens; Souter
	Northwest Austin Municipal Util. Dist. No. One v. Holder	557 U.S. 193 (2009)	Voting Rights Act of 1965 • preclearance • eligibility of utility district for bailout provision	Stevens, Scalia, Kennedy, Souter, Ginsburg, Breyer, Alito	Thomas
