= 2008 term United States Supreme Court opinions of Anthony Kennedy =

The 2008 term of the Supreme Court of the United States began October 6, 2008, and concluded October 4, 2009. This was the twenty-second term of Associate Justice Anthony Kennedy's tenure on the Court.
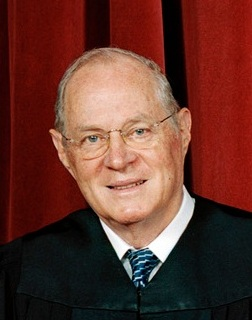

Anthony Kennedy 2008 term statistics

7	Majority or plurality	4	Concurrence	1	Other
1	Dissent	1	Concurrence/dissent	Total =	14
Bench opinions = 13		Opinions relating to orders = 1		In-chambers opinions = 0
Unanimous opinions: 0		Most joined by: Roberts (6)		Least joined by: Stevens (2)

Type	Case	Citation	Issues	Joined by	Other opinions
	Summers v. Earth Island Institute	555 U.S. 488 (2009)	Forest Service Decisionmaking and Appeals Reform Act • regulatory exceptions to notice and comment procedures • Article III • standing		Scalia; Breyer
	Negusie v. Holder	555 U.S. 511 (2009)	immigration law • Refugee Act of 1980 • persecutor bar for refugee applicants	Roberts, Scalia, Souter, Ginsburg	Scalia; Stevens; Thomas
	Bartlett v. Strickland	556 U.S. 1 (2009)	Voting Rights Act of 1965 • legislative redistricting • vote dilution	Roberts, Alito	Thomas; Souter; Ginsburg; Breyer
	Ministry of Defense and Support for Armed Forces of the Islamic Republic of Iran v. Elahi	556 U.S. 366 (2009)	attachment to judgment in favor of foreign government • Terrorism Risk Insurance Act of 2002 • Victims of Trafficking and Violence Protection Act of 2000	Souter, Ginsburg	Breyer
	Nken v. Holder	556 U.S. 418 (2009)	immigration law • Illegal Immigration Reform and Immigrant Responsibility Act of 1996 • stay of removal order	Scalia	Roberts; Alito
	FCC v. Fox Television Stations, Inc.	556 U.S. 202 (2009)	Public Telecommunications Act of 1992 • indecency ban on broadcast television • fleeting expletives		Scalia; Thomas; Stevens; Ginsburg; Breyer
	Ashcroft v. Iqbal	556 U.S. 662 (2009)	post-9/11 detention • qualified immunity • collateral order doctrine • Federal Rules of Civil Procedure • sufficiency of pleadings in discrimination case	Roberts, Scalia, Thomas, Alito	Souter; Breyer
	Caperton v. A. T. Massey Coal Co.	556 U.S. 868 (2009)	Due Process Clause • recusal • judicial campaign contributions from litigant	Stevens, Souter, Ginsburg, Breyer	Roberts; Scalia
	United States v. Denedo	556 U.S. 904 (2009)	Uniform Code of Military Justice • coram nobis • All Writs Act	Stevens, Souter, Ginsburg, Breyer	Roberts
	N.C.P. Marketing Group, Inc. v. BG Star Productions, Inc.	556 U.S. 1145 (2009)	bankruptcy law • Chapter 11 • assumption of pre-bankruptcy executory contracts by debtor-in-possession	Breyer	
Kennedy filed a statement respecting the denial of certiorari.
	Yeager v. United States	557 U.S. 110 (2009)	Double Jeopardy Clause • issue preclusion • inconsistency between acquittal and hung jury		Stevens; Scalia; Alito
	Coeur Alaska, Inc. v. Southeast Alaska Conservation Council	557 U.S. 261 (2009)	Clean Water Act • Army Corps of Engineers authority to issue slurry discharge permit	Roberts, Thomas, Breyer, Alito; Scalia (in part)	Scalia; Breyer; Ginsburg
	Melendez-Diaz v. Massachusetts	557 U.S. 305 (2009)	Sixth Amendment • Confrontation Clause • forensic analyst affidavits	Roberts, Breyer, Alito	Scalia; Thomas
	Ricci v. DeStefano	557 U.S. 557 (2009)	Title VII • disparate impact • exams used for employee promotions	Roberts, Scalia, Thomas, Alito	Scalia; Alito; Ginsburg
