= 2008 term United States Supreme Court opinions of David Souter =

The 2008 term of the Supreme Court of the United States began October 6, 2008, and concluded October 4, 2009. This was the nineteenth and final term of Associate Justice David Souter's tenure on the Court; Souter retired on June 29, 2009.
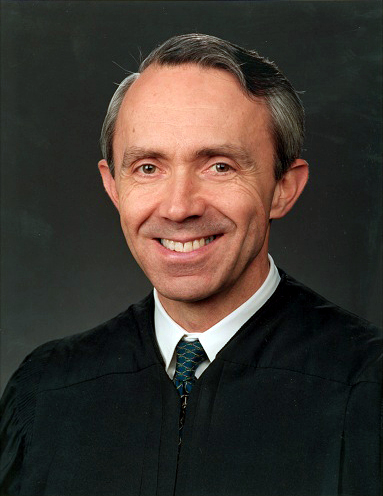

David Souter 2008 term statistics

8	Majority or plurality	2	Concurrence	0	Other
10	Dissent	1	Concurrence/dissent	Total =	21
Bench opinions = 21		Opinions relating to orders = 0		In-chambers opinions = 0
Unanimous opinions: 3		Most joined by: Stevens (15)		Least joined by: Thomas, Alito (6)

Type	Case	Citation	Issues	Joined by	Other opinions
	Waddington v. Sarausad	555 U.S. 179 (2009)	habeas corpus • Antiterrorism and Effective Death Penalty Act of 1996 • accomplice liability	Stevens, Ginsburg	Thomas
	Crawford v. Nashville	555 U.S. 271 (2009)	Title VII • antiretaliation provision	Roberts, Stevens, Scalia, Kennedy, Ginsburg, Breyer	Alito
	Kennedy v. Plan Administrator for DuPont Sav. and Investment Plan	555 U.S. 285 (2009)	Employee Retirement Income Security Act of 1974 • prohibition on assignment or alienation of benefits • waiver of benefits	Unanimous	
	United States v. Eurodif S. A.	555 U.S. 305 (2009)	Tariff Act of 1930 • nuclear power plant fuel procurement contracts • dumping	Unanimous	
	Ysursa v. Pocatello Ed. Assn.	555 U.S. 353 (2009)	First Amendment • public employee unions • state ban on payroll deductions for political activities		Roberts; Ginsburg; Breyer; Stevens
	Carcieri v. Salazar	555 U.S. 379 (2009)	Indian Reorganization Act • legal status of Narragansett Tribe • authority of Secretary of the Interior to take land in trust	Ginsburg	Thomas; Breyer; Stevens
	Pleasant Grove City v. Summum	555 U.S. 460 (2009)	First Amendment • free speech • government speech • public forums		Alito; Stevens; Scalia; Breyer
	Bartlett v. Strickland	556 U.S. 1 (2009)	Voting Rights Act of 1965 • legislative redistricting • vote dilution	Stevens, Ginsburg, Breyer	Kennedy; Thomas; Ginsburg; Breyer
	Puckett v. United States	556 U.S. 129 (2009)	Federal Rules of Criminal Procedure • plain-error standard for unpreserved claims of error • breach of plea agreement	Stevens	Scalia
	14 Penn Plaza LLC v. Pyett	556 U.S. 247 (2009)	Age Discrimination in Employment Act of 1967 • arbitration clause in collective bargaining agreement	Stevens, Ginsburg, Breyer	Thomas; Stevens
	United States v. Navajo Nation	556 U.S. 287 (2009)	Navajo Nation • Navajo-Hopi Rehabilitation Act of 1950 • Surface Mining Control and Reclamation Act of 1977 • failure of Secretary of Interior to promptly approve tribal coal lease royalty rate increase	Stevens	Scalia
	Corley v. United States	556 U.S. 303 (2009)	confession after unreasonable delay • Federal Rules of Criminal Procedure • voluntariness of confession	Stevens, Kennedy, Ginsburg, Breyer	Alito
	Shinseki v. Sanders	556 U.S. 396 (2009)	denial of benefits by Department of Veterans Affairs • failure to give notice of required evidence • harmless error	Stevens, Ginsburg	Breyer
	Arthur Andersen LLP v. Carlisle	556 U.S. 624 (2009)	Federal Arbitration Act • appealability of order denying stay of arbitrable action	Roberts, Stevens	Scalia
	Ashcroft v. Iqbal	556 U.S. 662 (2009)	post-9/11 detention • qualified immunity • collateral order doctrine • Federal Rules of Civil Procedure • sufficiency of pleadings in discrimination case	Stevens, Ginsburg, Breyer	Kennedy; Breyer
	AT&T Corp. v. Hulteen	556 U.S. 701 (2009)	Pregnancy Discrimination Act • calculating pregnancy leave for pension plan accrual	Roberts, Stevens, Scalia, Kennedy, Thomas, Alito	Stevens; Ginsburg
	Abuelhawa v. United States	556 U.S. 816 (2009)	Controlled Substances Act • use of telephone to facilitate drug purchase	Unanimous	
	District Attorney's Office for Third Judicial Dist. v. Osborne	557 U.S. 52 (2009)	Due Process Clause • postconviction access to state evidence for DNA testing • substantive due process		Roberts; Alito; Stevens
	Travelers Indemnity Co. v. Bailey	557 U.S. 137 (2009)	bankruptcy law • enjoined claims	Roberts, Scalia, Kennedy, Souter, Thomas, Breyer, Alito	Stevens
	Forest Grove School Dist. v. T. A.	557 U.S. 230 (2009)	Individuals with Disabilities Education Act • reimbursement for private special education services	Scalia, Thomas	Stevens
	Safford Unified School District v. Redding	557 U.S. 364 (2009)	Fourth Amendment • strip search of public school student for contraband	Roberts, Scalia, Kennedy, Breyer, Alito; Stevens, Ginsburg (in part)	Stevens; Thomas; Ginsburg
