= 2008 term United States Supreme Court opinions of Ruth Bader Ginsburg =

The 2008 term of the Supreme Court of the United States began October 6, 2008, and concluded October 4, 2009. This was the sixteenth term of Associate Justice Ruth Bader Ginsburg's tenure on the Court.
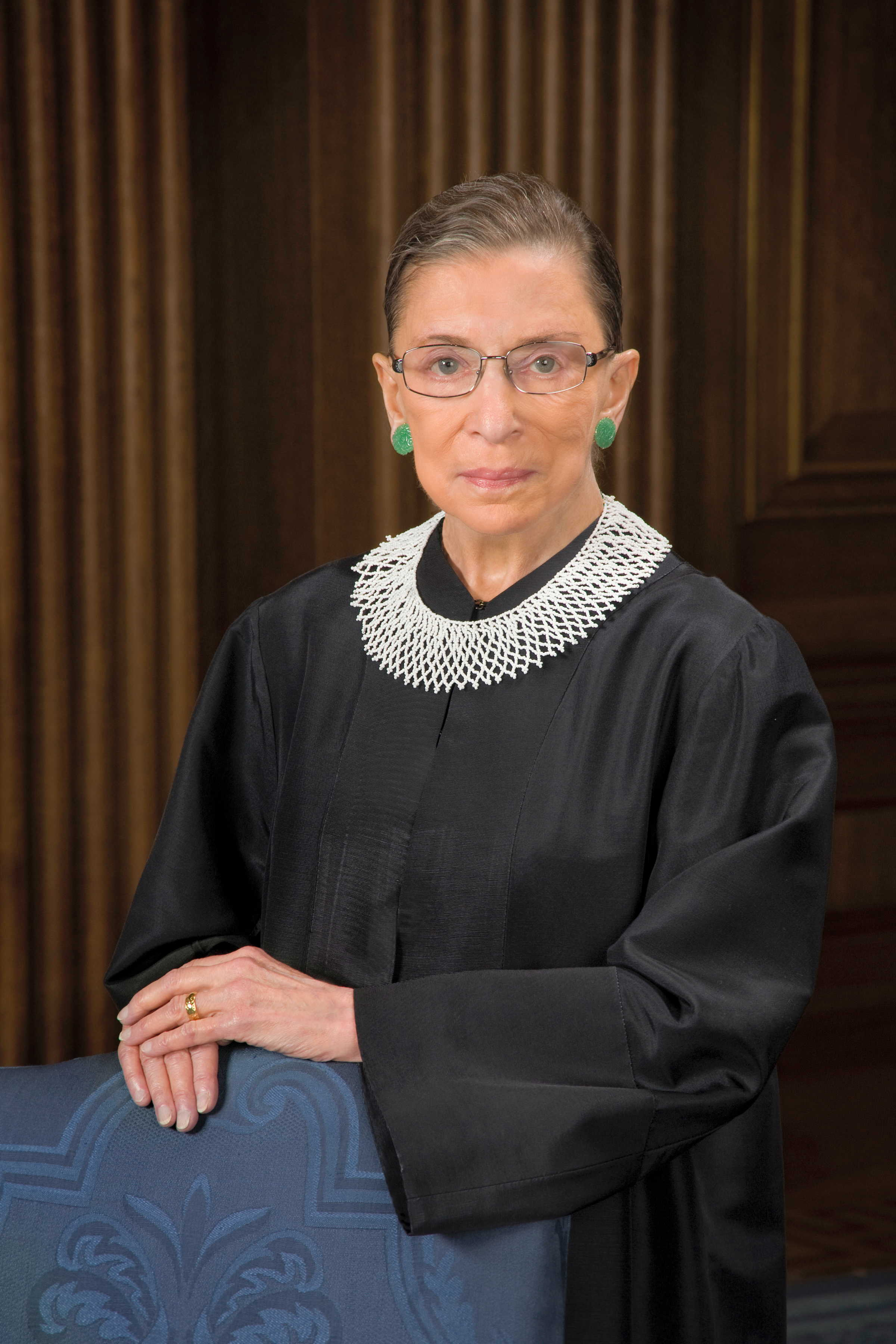

Ruth Bader Ginsburg 2008 term statistics

7	Majority or plurality	1	Concurrence	1	Other
9	Dissent	1	Concurrence/dissent	Total =	19
Bench opinions = 18		Opinions relating to orders = 0		In-chambers opinions = 1
Unanimous opinions: 3		Most joined by: Souter (10)		Least joined by: Roberts (4)

Type	Case	Citation	Issues	Joined by	Other opinions
	Winter v. Natural Resources Defense Council, Inc.	555 U.S. 7 (2008)	National Environmental Policy Act • impact of naval sonar testing on marine mammals • environmental impact statements	Souter	Roberts; Breyer
	Herring v. United States	555 U.S. 135 (2009)	Fourth Amendment • exclusionary rule • effect of police negligence on search	Stevens, Souter, Breyer	Roberts; Breyer
	Oregon v. Ice	555 U.S. 160 (2009)	Sixth Amendment • right to jury trial • imposition of consecutive sentences for multiple offenses	Stevens, Kennedy, Breyer, Alito	Scalia
	Arizona v. Johnson	555 U.S. 323 (2009)	Fourth Amendment • investigatory stop • search of passenger during traffic stop	Unanimous	
	Ysursa v. Pocatello Ed. Assn.	555 U.S. 353 (2009)	First Amendment • public employee unions • state ban on payroll deductions for political activities		Roberts; Breyer; Stevens; Souter
	United States v. Hayes	555 U.S. 415 (2009)	Gun Control Act of 1968 • domestic violence predicate offense	Stevens, Kennedy, Souter, Breyer, Alito; Thomas (in part)	Roberts
	Bartlett v. Strickland	556 U.S. 1 (2009)	Voting Rights Act of 1965 • legislative redistricting • vote dilution		Kennedy; Thomas; Souter; Breyer
	Vaden v. Discover Bank	556 U.S. 49 (2009)	Federal Arbitration Act • petition in federal court to compel arbitration • federal question jurisdiction	Scalia, Kennedy, Souter, Thomas	Roberts
	Vermont v. Brillon	556 U.S. 81 (2009)	Sixth Amendment • Speedy Trial Clause • delay attributable to court-appointed defense counsel	Roberts, Scalia, Kennedy, Souter, Thomas, Alito	Breyer
	Rivera v. Illinois	556 U.S. 148 (2009)	Fourteenth Amendment • Due Process Clause • right to fair trial before impartial jury • good-faith error in denying peremptory challenge	Unanimous	
	FCC v. Fox Television Stations, Inc.	556 U.S. 502 (2009)	Public Telecommunications Act of 1992 • indecency ban on broadcast television • fleeting expletives		Scalia; Kennedy; Thomas; Stevens; Breyer
	Burlington N. & S. F. R. Co. v. United States	556 U.S. 599 (2009)	Comprehensive Environmental Response, Compensation, and Liability Act • cleanup cost liability for arranger of hazardous waste disposal		Stevens
	AT&T Corp. v. Hulteen	556 U.S. 701 (2009)	Pregnancy Discrimination Act • calculating pregnancy leave for pension plan accrual	Breyer	Souter; Stevens
	Bobby v. Bies	556 U.S. 825 (2009)	Double Jeopardy Clause • issue preclusion • relitigation of defendant's mental retardation	Unanimous	
	CSX Transp., Inc. v. Hensley	556 U.S. 838 (2009)	Federal Employers' Liability Act • asbestos litigation • jury instruction on fear-of-cancer damages		per curiam; Stevens
	Conkright v. Frommert	556 U.S. 1401 (2009)	effect of request for view of Solicitor General on likelihood of granting certiorari		
Ginsburg denied the request for a stay of the lower court's judgment.
	Coeur Alaska, Inc. v. Southeast Alaska Conservation Council	557 U.S. 261 (2009)	Clean Water Act • Army Corps of Engineers authority to issue slurry discharge permit	Stevens, Souter	Kennedy; Scalia; Breyer
	Safford Unified School District v. Redding	557 U.S. 364 (2009)	Fourth Amendment • strip search of public school student for contraband		Souter; Stevens; Thomas
	Ricci v. DeStefano	557 U.S. 557 (2009)	Title VII • disparate impact • exams used for employee promotions	Stevens, Souter, Breyer	Kennedy; Scalia; Alito
