= Confession of error =

US legal practice regarding Federal decisions in the Supreme Court

Confession of error is a legal practice whereby the Solicitor General of the United States in their role representing the federal government before the Supreme Court of the United States admits a lower court incorrectly decided a case and it is thereby sent back for reconsideration. By confessing error, the Solicitor General declares that the federal government's position, which prevailed in the lower court, was wrong. The Supreme Court typically then vacates the lower court's judgment and remands the case to allow the lower court to consider it in light of the confession of error.

The practice was introduced in 1891 by William Howard Taft (who would later be U.S. president and then chief justice). At his urging, the Supreme Court overturned a murder conviction which had been obtained by inadmissible hearsay evidence in Texas.

A more modern example is that of Solicitor General Drew S. Days III, who argued in a petition for certiorari in Knox v. United States that the circuit court's decision had been wrong, even though the circuit court had found in favor of the government. He urged the Supreme Court to vacate Knox's conviction for possession of child pornography; they remanded the case to circuit court.
