= Cuomo v. Clearing House Ass'n =

Cuomo v. Clearing House Association, L. L. C.
- Supreme Court of the United States

Argued April 28, 2009 Decided June 29, 2009
- Full case name: Andrew M. Cuomo, Attorney General of New York, Petitioner v. The Clearing House Association, L.L.C., 129 S. Ct. 2710
- Docket no.: 08-453
- Citations: 557 U.S. 519 (more) 129 S. Ct. 2710; 174 L. Ed. 2d 464; 2009 U.S. LEXIS 4944

Case history
- Prior: Clearing House Ass'n, L.L.C. v. Spitzer, 394 F. Supp. 2d 620 (S.D.N.Y. 2005); 396 F. Supp. 2d 383 (S.D.N.Y. 2005); affirmed in part, reversed in part, Clearing House Ass'n, L.L.C. v. Cuomo, 510 F.3d 105 (2d Cir. 2007), cert. granted, 555 U.S. 1130 (2009).

Holding
- 12 U.S.C. § 484 and 12 CFR § 7.4000 do not prohibit measures taken by the New York State Attorney General to enforce state fair lending law against national banks. Visitorial powers accorded to the OCC do not preempt state laws regulating banks.

Court membership
- Chief Justice John Roberts Associate Justices John P. Stevens · Antonin Scalia; Anthony Kennedy · Clarence Thomas; Ruth Bader Ginsburg · Stephen Breyer; Samuel Alito

Case opinions
- Majority: Scalia, joined by Stevens, Souter, Ginsburg, Breyer
- Concur/dissent: Thomas, joined by Roberts, Kennedy, Alito

Cuomo v. Clearing House Association, L.L.C., 557 U.S. 519 (2009), was a case decided by the United States Supreme Court. In a 5–4 decision, the court determined that a federal banking regulation did not pre-empt the ability of states to enforce their own fair-lending laws. The Court determined that the Office of the Comptroller of the Currency is the sole regulator of national banks but it does not have the authority under the National Bank Act to pre-empt state law enforcement against national banks.

The case came out of an interpretation of the US Treasury Department's Office of the Comptroller of the Currency which had blocked an investigation by New York into lending practices. The OCC claimed that the 1864 National Bank Act bars states from enforcing their own laws against national banks.

Justice Scalia stated in the opinion that while the OCC has "visitorial powers," the right to examine the affairs of a corporation, that does not mean that it has the exclusive right to enforcement. "A sovereign's 'visitorial powers' and its power to enforce the law are two different things. Contrary to what the [OCC's] regulation says, the National Bank Act pre-empts only the former." Scalia noted that states "have always enforced their general laws against national banks—and have enforced their banking-related laws against national banks for at least 85 years."

The case is notable for the justices composing the 5–4 majority, which included the liberal justices (John Paul Stevens, David Souter, Ruth Bader Ginsburg, and Stephen Breyer) along with the conservative Scalia, who authored the opinion. Justice Clarence Thomas, joined by Justices Samuel Alito, Anthony Kennedy, and Chief Justice John Roberts, wrote a dissent.

The case is further notable for the suggested relationship of this OCC decision to the 2008 financial crisis.

== See also ==
- List of United States Supreme Court cases, volume 557
- List of United States Supreme Court cases
- The Clearing House
