= Pacific Bell Telephone Co. v. linkLine Communications, Inc. =

- Supreme Court of the United States

Argued December 8, 2008 Decided February 25, 2009
- Full case name: Pacific Bell Telephone Co., dba AT&T California, et al. v. linkLine Communications, Inc., et al.
- Docket no.: 07-512
- Citations: 555 U.S. 438 (more) 129 S. Ct. 1109; 172 L. Ed. 2d 836

Holding
- A "price squeezing" claim cannot be brought under Section 2 of the Sherman Act when the defendant is under no duty to sell inputs to the plaintiff in the first place.

Court membership
- Chief Justice John Roberts Associate Justices John P. Stevens · Antonin Scalia; Anthony Kennedy · David Souter; Clarence Thomas · Ruth Bader Ginsburg; Stephen Breyer · Samuel Alito

Case opinions
- Majority: Roberts, joined by Scalia, Kennedy, Thomas, Alito
- Concurrence: Breyer (in judgment), joined by Stevens, Souter, Ginsburg

Laws applied
- Section 2 of the Sherman Antitrust Act

Pacific Bell Telephone Co. v. linkLine Communications, Inc., 555 U.S. 438 (2009), was a United States Supreme Court case in which the Court unanimously held that Pacific Bell d/b/a AT&T did not violate the Sherman Antitrust Act when it charged other Internet providers a high fee to buy space on its phone lines to deliver an Internet connection. The court ruled that where there is no duty to deal at the wholesale level and no predatory pricing at the retail level, a firm is not required to price both of these services in a manner that preserves its rivals’ profit margins.

This case was initiated by Internet service providers (ISP), alleging that incumbent telephone companies that owned infrastructure and facilities needed to provide digital subscriber line (DSL) service monopolized and attempted to monopolize regional DSL market. The ISP's claimed that the telephone companies accomplished this by squeezing the providers' profits by charging them high wholesale price for DSL transport and charging consumers low retail price for DSL Internet service. Ultimately, the court concluded that the case was not moot, as it was not clear whether the providers had unequivocally abandoned their price-squeeze claims; prudential concerns favored answering the question presented.
