= Oregon v. Ice =

- Supreme Court of the United States

Argued October 14, 2008 Decided January 14, 2009
- Full case name: Oregon, Petitioner v. Thomas Eugene Ice
- Citations: 555 U.S. 160 (more) 129 S.Ct. 711; 172 L. Ed. 2d 517; 2009 U.S. LEXIS 582

Case history
- Prior: State v. Ice, 178 Or. App. 415, 39 P.3d 291 (2001); reversed, 343 Or. 248, 170 P.3d 1049 (2007); cert. granted, 552 U.S. 1256 (2008).

Holding
- The Sixth Amendment does not inhibit states from assigning to judges, rather than juries, the finding of facts necessary to the imposition of consecutive, rather than concurrent, sentences for multiple offenses.

Court membership
- Chief Justice John Roberts Associate Justices John P. Stevens · Antonin Scalia; Anthony Kennedy · David Souter; Clarence Thomas · Ruth Bader Ginsburg; Stephen Breyer · Samuel Alito

Case opinions
- Majority: Ginsburg, joined by Stevens, Kennedy, Breyer, Alito
- Dissent: Scalia, joined by Roberts, Souter, Thomas

Laws applied
- U.S. Const. Amend. VI, Ore. Rev. Stat. 137.123

Oregon v. Ice, 555 U.S. 160 (2009), was a legal case in which the Supreme Court of the United States held that the Sixth Amendment to the United States Constitution does not inhibit states from assigning to judges, rather than juries, the finding of facts necessary to the imposition of consecutive, rather than concurrent, sentences for multiple offenses.

Ice, a supervisor of an apartment complex, twice entered a residence and, on each occasion, touched the breasts and vagina of an 11-year-old girl. For each incident, a jury found him guilty of first-degree burglary for entering with the intent to commit sexual assault, as well as two counts of sexual abuse.

The statute under which Ice was sentenced, Oregon Revised Statutes 137.123, generally provided for concurrent sentences. However, it allowed for consecutive sentencing when the offenses did not arise from the same course of conduct. The statute also allowed for such sentencing when the offense was indicative of a willingness to commit more than one offense, or the offense caused or created a risk of greater or qualitatively different harm to the victim.

The trial judge found that Ice's conduct satisfied these criteria and ordered that his sentences for the two burglaries and the two sexual assaults, in which he touched the girl's vagina, to be served consecutively. The judge allowed the two sexual assault sentences for touching the girl's breasts to be served concurrently. Thus, the judge's action nearly quadrupled his sentence from 7.5 years to over 28 years.

== Question presented ==
When a defendant has been tried and convicted of multiple offenses, each involving discrete sentencing prescriptions, does the Sixth Amendment mandate jury determination of any fact declared necessary to the imposition of consecutive, in lieu of concurrent, sentences?

== Majority opinion ==
Justice Ginsburg, joined by Justices Stevens, Kennedy, Breyer, and Alito, held that the Sixth Amendment does not prohibit a judge from determining facts that enter into his decision whether to order that sentences for discrete offenses be served consecutively or concurrently.

In a majority of states, the judge has full discretion as to whether sentences for discrete offenses run consecutively or concurrently. In some states, all sentences are presumed to run consecutively unless the judge chooses to order that they run concurrently. The system at issue in Oregon here is that judges are limited in their discretion because they must find certain facts before ordering sentences to run consecutively. This decision clarified that none of these arrangements are prohibited by the Sixth Amendment.

The Court's decision was based on considerations of historical practice, and respect for state sovereignty. As to the first consideration, at common law, judges retained the discretion as to whether to impose sentences consecutively or concurrently for discrete offenses: that was not a function for the jury. Recent legislative enactments are meant to mitigate the harshness of the historical rule, but that does not mean that a defendant is entitled to his sentences running concurrently. Here, the Court found that the judge had not infringed upon jury's role as the finder of fact or its role "as a bulwark at trial between the State and the accused." Also, the Court sought to respect state sovereignty by not second-guessing the state's administration of its criminal justice system without a compelling reason to do so.

== Dissent ==
Justice Scalia wrote the dissenting opinion, with Chief Justice Roberts, Souter, and Thomas joining the dissent.

Scalia criticized the majority opinion as being contrary to Apprendi v. New Jersey, United States v. Booker, and Blakely v. Washington, in which the court had held that any fact (other than a previous conviction) must be admitted by the defendant or proved beyond a reasonable doubt before a jury. Scalia noted, "The Court's justification of Oregon's scheme is a virtual copy of the dissents in those cases.

"...Instead, the Court attempts to distinguish Oregon's sentencing scheme by reasoning that the rule of Apprendi applies only to the length of a sentence for an individual crime and not to the total sentence for a defendant. I cannot understand why we would make such a strange exception to the treasured right of trial by jury. Neither the reasoning of the Apprendi line of cases, nor any distinctive history of the factfinding necessary to imposition of consecutive sentences, nor (of course) logic supports such an odd rule.

"...Finally, the Court summons up the parade of horribles assembled by the amicus brief of 17 States supporting Oregon. It notes that '[t]rial judges often find facts' in connection with 'a variety of sentencing determinations other than the length of incarceration,' and worries that even their ability to set the length of supervised release, impose community service, or order entry into a drug rehabilitation program, may be called into question. Ante, at 10. But if these courses reduce rather than augment the punishment that the jury verdict imposes, there is no problem."

== Significance ==
The Court here limited the application of a rule laid down in Apprendi v. New Jersey and extended in Blakely v. Washington and Cunningham v. California, requiring juries to find the existence of certain facts before increasing the length of a defendant's prison sentence beyond the statutory maximum.
