= Forest Grove School District v. T. A. =

Forest Grove School District v. T.A.
- Supreme Court of the United States

Argued April 28, 2009 Decided June 22, 2009
- Full case name: Forest Grove School District v. T.A.
- Docket no.: 08-305
- Citations: 557 U.S. 230 (more) 129 S. Ct. 2484; 174 L. Ed. 2d 168; 2009 U.S. LEXIS 4645

Case history
- Prior: 640 F. Supp. 2d 1320 (D. Or. 2005); reversed, 523 F.3d 1078 (9th Cir. 2008); cert. granted, 555 U.S. 1130 (2009).
- Subsequent: On remand, 675 F. Supp. 2d 1063 (D. Or. 2009); affirmed, 638 F.3d 1234 (9th Cir. 2011); cert. denied, 565 U.S. 1185 (2012).

Holding
- IDEA authorizes reimbursement for private special-education services when a public school fails to provide a FAPE and the private-school placement is appropriate, regardless of whether the child previously received special-education services through the public school.

Court membership
- Chief Justice John Roberts Associate Justices John P. Stevens · Antonin Scalia; Anthony Kennedy · David Souter; Clarence Thomas · Ruth Bader Ginsburg; Stephen Breyer · Samuel Alito

Case opinions
- Majority: Stevens, joined by Roberts, Kennedy, Ginsburg, Breyer, Alito
- Dissent: Souter, joined by Scalia, Thomas

Laws applied
- Individuals with Disabilities Education Act (IDEA), 20 U.S.C. § 1400

Forest Grove School District v. T. A., 557 U.S. 230 (2009), is a case in which the United States Supreme Court held that the Individuals with Disabilities Education Act (IDEA) authorizes reimbursement for private special education services when a public school fails to provide a "free appropriate public education" (FAPE) and the private school placement is appropriate, regardless of whether the child previously received special education services through the public school.

== Background ==
T.A. attended public school in the Forest Grove School District in Forest Grove, Oregon, from kindergarten through the winter term of his junior year in high school. In high school T.A. had difficulty with his schoolwork, but the school determined that T.A. did not qualify for special education services. In 2003 T.A. was diagnosed with ADHD and a number of learning disabilities. Subsequently, T.A. was enrolled in a private school that focused on special needs children.

== Opinion of the Court ==
Justice Stevens held that the Individuals with Disabilities Education Act did not categorically bar reimbursement of private education tuition if a child had not previously received special education and related services through the school. The court remanded the case back to the United States District Court for the District of Oregon to determine if the family at issue was then entitled to reimbursement.

== Dissent ==
Justice Souter filed a dissent joined by Justice Scalia and Justice Thomas. Justice Souter argued that School Comm. of Burlington v. Department of Ed. of Mass., 471 U.S. 359 (1985), was controlling and IDEA prohibits reimbursement if the school district has made a free appropriate public education available.

== Subsequent history ==
In December 2009, federal district court judge Michael W. Mosman determined the family was not eligible for reimbursement under the IDEA. The parents in the case had sent their son to Mount Bachelor Academy due to behavioral problems and the use of drugs. Mosman ruled that the special reason for the special education, behavioral issues and drug use, were not disabilities covered under federal law, and the parents had not listed ADHD when applying to the academy. The parents appealed the decision to the Ninth Circuit, which upheld Judge Mosman's ruling.
