= Travelers Indemnity Co. v. Bailey =

- Supreme Court of the United States

Decided June 18, 2009
- Full case name: Travelers Indemnity Co. v. Bailey
- Citations: 557 U.S. 137 (more)

Holding
- A bankruptcy settlement that immunizes a third party from liability based on events relevant to the bankruptcy is enforceable and cannot be challenged after the Bankruptcy Court approves the settlement with those terms.

Court membership
- Chief Justice John Roberts Associate Justices John P. Stevens · Antonin Scalia; Anthony Kennedy · David Souter; Clarence Thomas · Ruth Bader Ginsburg; Stephen Breyer · Samuel Alito

Case opinions
- Majority: Souter, joined by Roberts, Scalia, Kennedy, Thomas, Breyer, Alito
- Dissent: Stevens, joined by Ginsburg

Travelers Indemnity Co. v. Bailey, 557 U.S. 137 (2009), was a United States Supreme Court case in which the court held that a bankruptcy settlement that immunizes a third party from liability based on events relevant to the bankruptcy is enforceable and cannot be challenged after the Bankruptcy Court approves the settlement with those terms.

== Background ==
As part of the 1986 reorganization plan of the Johns-Manville Corporation (Manville), an asbestos supplier and manufacturer of asbestos-containing products, the Bankruptcy Court approved a settlement providing that Manville's insurers, including The Travelers Indemnity Company and related companies (Travelers), would contribute to the corpus of the Manville Personal Injury Settlement Trust (Trust), and releasing those insurers from any "Policy Claims," which were channeled to the Trust. "Policy Claims" include, among other things, "claims" and "allegations" against the insurers "based upon, arising out of or relating to" the Manville insurance policies. The settlement agreement and reorganization plan were approved by the Bankruptcy Court (1986 Orders) and were affirmed by the federal District Court and the Second Circuit Court of Appeals.

Over a decade later, plaintiffs began filing asbestos actions against Travelers in state courts (Direct Actions), often seeking to recover from Travelers not for Manville's wrongdoing but for Travelers' own alleged violations of state consumer-protection statutes or of common law duties. Invoking the 1986 Orders, Travelers asked the Bankruptcy Court to enjoin twenty-six Direct Actions. Ultimately, a settlement was reached, in which Travelers agreed to make payments to compensate the Direct Action claimants, contingent on the court's order clarifying that the Direct Actions were, and remained, prohibited by the 1986 Orders.

The court made extensive factual findings and concluded that Travelers derived its knowledge of asbestos from its insurance relationship with Manville and that the Direct Actions were based on acts or omissions by Travelers arising from or related to the insurance policies. It then approved the settlement and entered an order (Clarifying Order), which provided that the 1986 Orders barred the pending Direct Actions and various other claims. Objectors to the settlement (including Bailey) appealed. The District Court affirmed, but the Second Circuit reversed. Agreeing that the Bankruptcy Court had jurisdiction to interpret and enforce the 1986 Orders, the Circuit nevertheless held that the Bankruptcy Court lacked jurisdiction to enjoin the Direct Actions because those actions sought not to recover based on Manville's conduct, but to recover directly from Travelers for its own conduct.

== Opinion of the court ==
The Supreme Court issued an opinion on June 18, 2009.
