= United States v. Hayes =

- Supreme Court of the United States

Argued November 10, 2008 Decided February 24, 2009
- Full case name: United States v. Hayes
- Docket no.: 07-608
- Citations: 555 U.S. 415 (more) 129 S. Ct. 1079; 172 L. Ed. 2d 816; 2009 U.S. LEXIS 1634; 77 USLW 4123; 09 Cal. Daily Op. Serv. 2199; 2009 Daily Journal D.A.R. 2612, 21 Fla. L. Weekly Fed. S 643

Case history
- Prior: District court denied defendant's motion to dismiss indictment, 377 F. Supp. 2d 540 (N.D.W.Va. 2005); appeals court reversed, 482 F.3d 749 (4th Cir. 2007).
- Subsequent: On remand, appeals court affirmed denial of motion to dismiss, 337 Fed.Appx. 285 (4th Cir. 2009).

Holding
- A conviction for a state crime of "domestic violence" obtains when the defendant is convicted of a crime based on actions which in fact constitute domestic violence; a state statute specifically proscribing domestic violence is not required

Court membership
- Chief Justice John Roberts Associate Justices John P. Stevens · Antonin Scalia; Anthony Kennedy · David Souter; Clarence Thomas · Ruth Bader Ginsburg; Stephen Breyer · Samuel Alito

Case opinions
- Majority: Ginsburg, joined by Stevens, Kennedy, Souter, Breyer, Alito; Thomas (all but Part III)
- Dissent: Roberts, joined by Scalia

Laws applied
- Federal Gun Control Act, Sections 922(g)(9) and 933(a)(33)(A)

United States v. Hayes, 555 U.S. 415 (2009), is a United States Supreme Court case interpreting Section 921(a)(33)(A) of the federal Gun Control Act of 1968, as amended in 1996. The Court held that a domestic relationship is not necessarily a defining element of the predicate offense to support a conviction for possession of a firearm by a person previously convicted of a misdemeanor crime of domestic violence.

== Background ==
The Gun Control Act had long prohibited convicted felons from owning firearms. In 1996 the Act was amended to extend this prohibition to persons convicted of a "misdemeanor crime of domestic violence."

The question before the Court was the statutory meaning of this prohibition, and how far it extended: did it require a state to have a specific statute that prohibited misdemeanor crimes of domestic violence, under which a person charged with an Act violation was convicted? Or did it only require that a person was convicted of a misdemeanor which in fact constituted "domestic violence," without regard to whether the misdemeanor statute specifically proscribed crimes of "domestic violence"?

== Facts and Issues ==
The facts of the Hayes case illustrate the distinction. In 1994 Hayes had been convicted in West Virginia of the misdemeanor of simple battery. The offense was committed against his wife in a domestic dispute. In 2004, the police found him in possession of firearms. Had he violated the Act?

The prosecution claimed the 1994 conviction for simple battery was sufficient to place him under the federal firearms ban. He had been convicted of a violent misdemeanor (battery) under state law. And the battery was, in fact, against his wife. This was enough, the prosecution alleged, to make that a conviction of a predicate crime of "domestic violence" which would, accordingly, bring him within the scope of the federal prohibition.

Hayes claimed that more was required before he was subject to the federal firearms possession ban of the Gun Control Act. He argued that the state must have a statute that specifically defined and prohibited "domestic violence" as an independent crime; a person convicted of that crime would then be subject to the federal prohibition under Act, but a person only convicted of another crime - such as simple battery - would not be so subjected.

Hayes agreed the person he battered was, in fact, his wife; but in 1994 the state of West Virginia did not have a statute that prohibited "domestic violence" as a specific crime. Therefore, Hayes argued, it was in effect legally impossible for him to be banned from firearm possession under the "domestic violence" extension for acts committed within West Virginia.

Hayes moved to dismiss the federal indictment but the trial court denied his motion. He entered a guilty plea, subject to his right to appeal the motion's denial, and the Fourth Circuit Court of Appeals agreed with Hayes on appeal. It decided that the state misdemeanor law must contain, as an element of the crime, a "domestic relationship between the offender and the victim," 482 F.3d 749, 751 (2007), and that the indictment was indeed faulty. The Supreme Court then accepted the case to resolve a split among the circuits.

== Supreme Court decision ==
The Supreme Court agreed with the Government that the indictment was sufficient and that the Fourth Circuit's interpretation of the Gun Control amendments was erroneous.
