= Waddington v. Sarausad =

- Supreme Court of the United States

Argued October 15, 2008 Decided January 21, 2009
- Full case name: Doug Waddington, Superintendent, Washington Corrections center, Petitioner v. Cesar Sarausad
- Citations: 555 U.S. 179 (more) 129 S. Ct. 823; 172 L. Ed. 2d 532; 2009 U.S. LEXIS 867; 77 U.S.L.W. 4056; 21 Fla. L. Weekly Fed. S 602

Holding
- Sarausad was tried with due process by the State of Washington and he should not have been granted habeas corpus relief. In doing so, the federal government overstepped its bounds.

Court membership
- Chief Justice John Roberts Associate Justices John P. Stevens · Antonin Scalia; Anthony Kennedy · David Souter; Clarence Thomas · Ruth Bader Ginsburg; Stephen Breyer · Samuel Alito

Case opinions
- Majority: Thomas, joined by Roberts, Scalia, Kennedy, Breyer, Alito
- Dissent: Souter, joined by Stevens, Ginsburg

Waddington v. Sarausad, 555 U.S. 179 (2009), was a United States Supreme Court case that involved the conviction of Cesar Sarausad for second-degree murder due to his role as driver in a shooting regarding gang activity and high school students. Sarausad sought federal habeas corpus relief, but the act of providing relief to Sarausad was called back into judicial review by the State of Washington in a certiorari petition. The Supreme Court agreed to review the case.

The Roberts Court held that Sarausad was tried with due process by the State of Washington, and that he should not have been granted habeas corpus relief. In doing so, the federal government overstepped its bounds.
