= Atlantic Sounding Co. v. Townsend =

- Supreme Court of the United States

Argued March 2, 2009 Decided June 25, 2009
- Full case name: Atlantic Sounding Co., Inc., et al., Petitioners v. Edgar L. Townsend
- Docket no.: 08-214
- Citations: 557 U.S. 404 (more) 129 S. Ct. 2561; 174 L. Ed. 2d 382; 2009 U.S. LEXIS 4732; 77 U.S.L.W. 4603; 29 I.E.R. Cas. (BNA) 385; 2009 AMC 1521; 21 Fla. L. Weekly Fed. S 1004

Holding
- Because punitive damages have long been an accepted remedy under general maritime law, and because neither Miles v. Apex Marine Corp. (1990) nor the Jones Act altered this understanding, punitive damages for the willful and wanton disregard of the maintenance and cure obligation remain available as a matter of general maritime law.

Court membership
- Chief Justice John Roberts Associate Justices John P. Stevens · Antonin Scalia; Anthony Kennedy · David Souter; Clarence Thomas · Ruth Bader Ginsburg; Stephen Breyer · Samuel Alito

Case opinions
- Majority: Thomas, joined by Stevens, Souter, Ginsburg, Breyer
- Dissent: Alito, joined by Roberts, Scalia, Kennedy

Atlantic Sounding Co. v. Townsend, 557 U.S. 404 (2009), was a decision by the Supreme Court of the United States holding that a seaman may recover punitive damages from his employer for failure to pay maintenance and cure. Townsend reversed a line of cases, starting with Guevara v. Maritime Overseas Corp. in the United States Court of Appeals for the Fifth Circuit (New Orleans), that restricted damages in maritime personal injury cases only to "pecuniary" damages. Consequently, a seaman can now recover both attorney's fees and punitive damages for the willful and wanton refusal of a shipowner to provide medical care to a seaman injured on the job. The Court's 5-4 opinion was delivered by Justice Clarence Thomas.

The Court explained that Congress never used the words "pecuniary" or "non-pecuniary" to describe the damages available for personal injuries (injuries not causing death) under either the Jones Act or the Federal Employers Liability Act. Congress merely said "damages"; hence, any limitation on those damages to "pecuniary damages" was a creation of the courts, not Congress. The Court stated that it "will not attribute words to Congress that Congress did not say."
