= Crawford v. Nashville =

- Supreme Court of the United States

Argued October 8, 2008 Decided January 26, 2009
- Full case name: Vicky S. Crawford, Petitioner v. Metropolitan Government of Nashville and Davidson County, Tennessee
- Docket no.: 06-1595
- Citations: 555 U.S. 271 (more) 129 S. Ct. 846; 172 L. Ed. 2d 650

Case history
- Prior: Summary judgment granted for defendant Metro, No. 3:03-cv-00996 (MD Tenn., Jan. 6, 2005), 2005 WL 6011557; Affirmed on appeal, 211 Fed.Appx. 373 (6th Cir. 2006).

Holding
- The anti-retaliation provision of section 704(a) of Title VII of the 1964 Civil Rights Act protects employees who merely cooperate with an internal probe rather than complain on their own or take part in a formal investigation.

Court membership
- Chief Justice John Roberts Associate Justices John P. Stevens · Antonin Scalia; Anthony Kennedy · David Souter; Clarence Thomas · Ruth Bader Ginsburg; Stephen Breyer · Samuel Alito

Case opinions
- Majority: Souter, joined by Roberts, Stevens, Scalia, Kennedy, Ginsburg, Breyer
- Concurrence: Alito, joined by Thomas

Laws applied
- Title VII of the Civil Rights Act of 1964

Crawford v. Nashville, 555 U.S. 271 (2009), is a United States Supreme Court case in which the Court unanimously ruled that Title VII of the Civil Rights Act of 1964 protects an employee who opposes unlawful sexual harassment, but does not report the harassment themself.

== Background ==
The petitioner, Vicky Crawford, was a long-time worker for the Metropolitan Government of Nashville and Davidson County. In 2002, the department of human resources began an investigation into Dr. Gene Hughes, the newly hired employee relations director for the Metro School District. Several female employees had expressed concern about being sexually harassed by Hughes. Veronica Frazier, the assistant director for the county human resources department was assigned to investigate the allegations.

Frazier began by calling employees who had worked closely with Hughes, including Crawford. Crawford described to Frazier several incidents of sexual harassment.

According to Crawford, Hughes had requested on "numerous" occasions to see her breasts. Hughes also, in response to the question "What's up?" grabbed his crotch and replied "You know what's up." On several occasions, Crawford continued, Hughes had pressed his crotch against the window of her office. On one occasion, when Crawford asked Hughes what she could do for him, he grabbed her head and pulled it towards his crotch. Other allegations were made by two other women who worked with Hughes.

Frazier's report did not resolve the allegations, as Hughes denied the allegations and there were no witnesses. The report concluded that Hughes had acted inappropriately, but no disciplinary action was taken against him. (In fact, even after information surfaced in March 2003 that he had made false statements on his resume, claiming untruthfully that he was an attorney, a professional football player with the Pittsburgh Steelers, and a Navy SEAL, Hughes was merely demoted from his $91,250 position to a $75,857 position, and then moved to the athletics department and given a $6,500 pay raise. Hughes resigned in August 2003 but was allowed to collect pay at home through October 2003.)

However, all three of the witnesses who had offered evidence of sexual harassment, including Crawford, were dismissed. Crawford had been employed by the district for over 30 years. Crawford had expressed reluctance to report the incidents earlier because Hughes headed the employee relations department where the charges were reported. Hughes was tasked with investigating claims of sexual harassment. Hughes was also, Crawford noted, a good friend of the Director of the School District Pedro Garcia, and Crawford was worried that this would result in her losing her job. The Metro School Board in January 2008 voted unanimously to end Crawford's tenure due to poor performance.

Following her termination, Crawford sued her former employer under Title VII, which protects employees who oppose unlawful employment actions from employment retaliation. The District Court concluded, and the Sixth Circuit Court affirmed, that Crawford was not protected by Title VII on two grounds. First, her statements to Frazier did not constitute "opposition" to illegal conduct, as Crawford did not initiate the investigation. Second, the court held that Crawford was not protected against retaliation because the investigation was an employer's internal investigation and a charge had not been filed with the Equal Employment Opportunity Commission. Crawford only filed with the EEOC after she had been terminated, as required by Title VII.

Crawford appealed to the Supreme Court, who heard the case on October 8, 2008. The court ruled unanimously in her favor on January 26, 2009.

== Decision ==
Writing for the majority, Justice Souter defines two activities Title VII protects, saying section 704(a) "makes it unlawful 'for an employer to discriminate against any... employe[e]' who (1) 'has opposed any practice made an unlawful employment practice by this subchapter' (opposition clause), or (2) 'has made a charge, testified, assisted, or participated in any manner in an investigation, proceeding, or hearing under this subchapter' (participation clause)." The Sixth Circuit held, when it heard the case, that the opposition clause demanded "active, consistent" opposing, which it did not find Crawford had done, as she did not initiate her own complaint before to the investigation. It also held that since the internal investigation was not conducted pursuant to a charge pending with the EEOC, Crawford was not protected by the participation clause. The court found that "oppose" is not defined by the statute, so a normal definition of it may be used, per Perrin v. United States. "Thus, a person can 'oppose' by responding to someone else’s questions just as surely as by provoking the discussion," further "we would call it 'opposition' if an employee took a stand against an employer’s discriminatory practices not by 'instigating' action, but by standing pat, say, by refusing to follow a supervisor’s order to fire a junior worker for discriminatory reasons." The court supposes there could be a hypothetical case in which an employee describes a "supervisor's racist joke as hilarious", but finds that these "will be eccentric cases, and this is not one of them."

It rejects Metro's argument that "employers will be less likely to raise questions about possible discrimination if a retaliation charge is easy to raise" because "[e]mployers... have a strong inducement to ferret out... discriminatory activity." This is because cases such as Burlington Industries, Inc. v. Ellerth and Faragher v. Boca Raton hold employers "vicariously liable" for actionable hostile working environments created by supervisors. (Such as Hughes "sexually obnoxious behavior".) Further, studies show that Ellerth and Faragher prompted employers to "adopt or strengthen procedures for investigating, preventing, and correcting discriminatory conduct." From the employees' perspective, agreeing with Nashville and the Sixth Circuit would mean the prudent employee may decide not answer questions regarding discrimination, as there would be no protection against retaliation. If employees choose not to participate in internal investigations, the employer would have a defense, should a Title VII lawsuit be filed, as Ellerth requires employees to reasonably "take advantage of... preventive or corrective opportunities provided by the employer," a situation described by the court as a "catch-22". The court, then, decided not to overturn the Ellerth-Faragher scheme. Having ruled on the "opposition" question, the court chose not to address the "participation" question.

Justice Alito wrote a concurrence joined by Justice Thomas, in which he agrees with the Court's primary reasoning, but separately emphasizes that, he believes, the Court's holding "does not and should not extend beyond employees who testify in internal investigations or engage in analogous purposive conduct." Alito disagrees with the Sixth Circuit that "opposition" must be consistent and initiated by the employee, but writes that the opposition must be "active and purposive". Alito finds the majority's definition of oppose could also "embrace silent opposition," and it is questionable whether that is protected. He worries that an "interpretation of the opposition clause that protects conduct that is not active and purposive" would "open the door to retaliation claims by employees who never expressed a word of opposition to their employers." As a hypothetical, he asks if an employee would be protected in a case where the opposition was expressed in an informal "water cooler" chat. A fired employee could claim that the termination was retaliatory if the employers became aware of the views the employee had expressed. He notes that EEOC retaliation charges doubled between 1992 and 2007 and fears that an "expansive interpretation of protected opposition conduct would likely cause this trend to accelerate."

While that is not the question of this case, Alito finds the answer "far from clear". For "present purposes", however, "it is enough to hold that the opposition clause does protect an employee" like Crawford.

== See also ==
- Chrapliwy v. Uniroyal
- Meritor Savings Bank v. Vinson
