= Summers v. Earth Island Institute =

- Supreme Court of the United States

Argued October 8, 2008 Decided March 3, 2009
- Full case name: Priscilla Summers, et al., Petitioners v. Earth Island Institute, et al.
- Docket no.: 07-463
- Citations: 555 U.S. 488 (more) 129 S. Ct. 1142; 173 L. Ed. 2d 1; 2009 U.S. LEXIS 1769; 77 U.S.L.W. 4146; 72 Fed. R. Serv. 3d (Callaghan) 1183; 67 ERC (BNA) 1961; 39 ELR 20047; 21 Fla. L. Weekly Fed. S 670

Case history
- Prior: Earth Island Institute v. Pengilly, 376 F. Supp. 2d 994 (E.D. Cal. 2005); affirmed sub. nom., Earth Island Inst. v. Ruthenbeck, 459 F.3d 954 (9th Cir. 2006); rehearing denied, 490 F.3d 687 (9th Cir. 2007); cert. granted, 552 U.S. 1162 (2008).

Holding
- Petitioner environmental organizations' claim that it is statistically likely that some of their members will visit the affected lands is insufficient to support Article III standing.

Court membership
- Chief Justice John Roberts Associate Justices John P. Stevens · Antonin Scalia; Anthony Kennedy · David Souter; Clarence Thomas · Ruth Bader Ginsburg; Stephen Breyer · Samuel Alito

Case opinions
- Majority: Scalia, joined by Roberts, Kennedy, Thomas, Alito
- Concurrence: Kennedy
- Dissent: Breyer, joined by Stevens, Souter, Ginsburg

Laws applied
- U.S. Const. art. III; Forest Service Decision-making and Appeals Reform Act

Summers v. Earth Island Institute, 555 U.S. 488 (2009), was a United States Supreme Court case decided 5–4 in which several environmental organizations, including Earth Island Institute, brought suit against the United States Forest Service (USFS) to enjoin the federal agency from implementing rules that would allow the salvage sale of timber from 238 acres of fire-damaged federally owned land without conducting the notice, comment, and appeal process of the Forest Service Decision-making and Appeals Reform Act.

While the environmental organizations were litigating the injunction in the lower courts, the parties reached a settlement regarding the 238 acres in question and the district court accordingly dismissed. The plaintiffs, however, maintained that they still had standing to challenge the constitutionality of the exemption process generally because the process was statistically certain to implicate their rights in the future. The Court decided that this argument failed because voluntarily settling the portion of their lawsuit relevant to Burnt Ridge caused respondents and their members to be no longer under threat of injury from the project. The Court decided against the plaintiffs by holding that the "deprivation of a procedural right without some concrete interest that is affected by the deprivation... is insufficient to create Article III standing."
