= Nken v. Holder =

- Supreme Court of the United States

Decided April 22, 2009
- Full case name: Nken v. Holder
- Citations: 556 U.S. 418 (more)

Holding
- Immigrants who are contesting their impending deportation may request stays using the ordinary standards, but they cannot claim that they will be irreparably injured by wrongful deportation.

Court membership
- Chief Justice John Roberts Associate Justices John P. Stevens · Antonin Scalia; Anthony Kennedy · David Souter; Clarence Thomas · Ruth Bader Ginsburg; Stephen Breyer · Samuel Alito

Case opinions
- Majority: Roberts
- Concurrence: Kennedy, joined by Scalia
- Dissent: Alito, joined by Thomas

Nken v. Holder, 556 U.S. 418 (2009), was a United States Supreme Court case in which the court held that immigrants who are contesting their impending deportation may request stays using the ordinary standards, but they cannot claim that they will be irreparably injured by wrongful deportation.

== Background ==
Jean Marc Nken sought an order from the Fourth Circuit Court of Appeals staying his removal to Cameroon while his petition for review of a Board of Immigration Appeals order denying his motion to reopen removal proceedings was pending. Nken acknowledged that Circuit precedent required a noncitizen seeking such a stay to satisfy 8 U.S.C. §1252(f)(2), which sharply restricts the availability of injunctions blocking the removal of a noncitizen from this country, but he argued that a court's authority to stay a removal order should instead be controlled by the traditional criteria governing stays. The Court of Appeals denied the stay motion without comment.

== Opinion of the court ==
The Supreme Court issued an opinion on April 22, 2009.

== Later developments ==
In 2012, the federal government sent a letter to the Supreme Court to admit that their briefing on this case was inaccurate and portrayed a too-rosy impression of how reliably the government was ensuring people wrongfully removed were returned. The government did not apologize for this error but said that it regretted the necessity of the disclosure and promised to do better in the future.
