= Dean v. United States =

- Supreme Court of the United States

Argued March 4, 2009 Decided April 29, 2009
- Full case name: Christopher Michael Dean, Petitioner v. United States
- Docket no.: 08-5274
- Citations: 556 U.S. 568 (more) 129 S. Ct. 1849; 173 L. Ed. 2d 785

Case history
- Prior: United States v. Dean, 517 F.3d 1224 (11th Cir. 2008)

Questions presented
- Whether a law providing for a mandatory 10-year prison term for the discharge of a firearm during a violent or drug trafficking crime applied if the firearm discharged accidentally.

Holding
- The 10-year mandatory minimum applies if a gun is discharged in the course of a violent or drug trafficking crime, whether on purpose or by accident.

Court membership
- Chief Justice John Roberts Associate Justices John P. Stevens · Antonin Scalia; Anthony Kennedy · David Souter; Clarence Thomas · Ruth Bader Ginsburg; Stephen Breyer · Samuel Alito

Case opinions
- Majority: Roberts, joined by Scalia, Kennedy, Souter, Thomas, Ginsburg, Alito
- Dissent: Stevens
- Dissent: Breyer

Laws applied
- 18 U.S.C. §924(c)(1)(A)(iii)

Dean v. United States, 556 U.S. 568 (2009), was a decision of the Supreme Court of the United States upholding a 10-year mandatory minimum sentence for the discharge of a firearm during the commission of any violent or drug trafficking crime, against a bank robber whose gun went off accidentally.

== Background ==
In 2004, Christopher M. Dean entered a branch of AmSouth Bank in Rome, Georgia wearing a mask and waving a gun. He instructed everyone to get down, walked behind the teller counter, and took cash from the teller station with his left hand while holding his gun with his right. The gun discharged, leaving a bullet hole in the partition between two stations. Dean cursed and ran out of the bank. Witnesses later testified that he seemed surprised that the gun had gone off. No one was hurt.

Dean and an accomplice were later caught and charged with conspiracy to commit a robbery affecting interstate commerce, in violation of 18 U.S.C. §1951(a), and aiding and abetting each other in using, carrying, possessing, and discharging a firearm during an armed robbery, in violation of §924(c)(1)(A)(iii) and §2. Dean admitted to committing the robbery and was convicted by a jury of the robbery and firearm counts.

Under 18 U.S.C. § 924(c)(1)(A)(iii), an individual convicted for using or carrying a firearm during and in relation to any violent or drug trafficking crime, or possessing a firearm in furtherance of such a crime, receives a 10-year mandatory minimum sentence, in addition to the punishment for the underlying crime "if the firearm is discharged."

Dean was sentenced to 10 years in prison. He appealed, contending that the discharge was accidental, and that the sentencing enhancement in §924(c)(1)(A)(iii) requires proof that the defendant intended to discharge the firearm. Deans conviction was affirmed by the Court of Appeals for the Eleventh Circuit and the Supreme Court of the United States granted certiorari to resolve a conflict in the circuits.

== Decision ==
Chief Justice John Roberts delivered the opinion of the Court.

In a 7 to 2 decision delivered by Chief Justice Roberts, the Supreme Court held that Section 924(c)(1)(A)(iii) required no separate proof of intent. Justice Stevens and Justice Breyer filed dissenting opinions.
