= Detentions following the September 11 attacks =

Soon after the attacks of September 11, 2001, the United States Government began detaining people who fit the profile of the suspected hijackers: mostly male, Arabic, or Muslim noncitizens. According to Justice Berman, they had arrested 1,182 people as of November 5, 2001. By late November 2001, more than 1,200 people had been detained. A document made and published by the US Department of Justice (DOJ) contained information about the detainees.

The Office of the Inspector general released a report in June 2003 that stated: "The Immigration and Naturalization Service (INS) detained 762 aliens as a result of the PENTTBOM investigation". Of those 762 people, 24 had an immigration violation prior to the September 11th attacks. They also reported "the remaining 738 aliens were arrested between September 11, 2001, and August 6, 2002, as a direct result of the FBI's PENTTBOM investigation." At that time, the government announced that it suspected 10 to 15 of the detainees as being al Qaeda sympathizers, but said that no evidence links them directly to the attacks. Opponents of the detentions claimed that the government had no valid grounds for these detentions.

== Detainees ==
Khalid Shaikh Muhammed, sometimes called KSM, is a terrorist who had been detained for being connected to the 9/11 attacks. An editorial research on CNN World says that he "has been called a mastermind of the September 11th attacks."

Muhammed is currently being detained at Guantanamo. A document published by New York Times says, "As of March 18, 2020, he has been held at Guantanamo for 13 years ."

Muhammed Haydar Zammar is a suspected recruiter for the 9/11 attack. A news article by Middle East Eye claims that “He was an influential cleric in Germany who helped arrange travel for Mohammed Atta - the head hijacker of the 9/11 attacks - to Afghanistan for al-Qaeda training, according to the Washington Post."

According to an online article from NBC, Zammar had been detained in late 2001 in Morocco when the CIA found and handed him over to the Syrian government, which was reported by Germany's Der Spiegel. In 2013, Zammar had been released from prison after being sentenced to 12 years in 2007 because the country was experiencing a civil war.

== Criticism ==
According to Irum Shiekh, author of Detained Without a Cause, immigration officials began categorizing certain Muslims as "Special Interest Cases" in which they were deemed as potential terrorists for one reason or another.

According to the George W. Bush Presidential papers, the government recognized that their actions against immigrants were not perfect, but they explained their actions the following way, “We did not criticize the decision to hold and investigate those aliens present in the United States who had violated immigration laws and whom the DOJ believed had connections with or possessed information pertaining to terrorist activities. Rather, we criticized the haphazard and indiscriminate manner in which the FBI labelled many detainees as "of interest" because they potentially had connections to or information about terrorism.” In addition to the acknowledgement, President George W. Bush also presented a speech. The contents of the speech include clarification upon the blame and heat people of racial relation to the 9/11 terrorists, along with admitting that it was uncalled for. This also contained reconciliation efforts in hopes of starting and preserve a new friendship with them.
