= Flores-Figueroa v. United States =

- Supreme Court of the United States

Argued February 25, 2009 Decided May 4, 2009
- Full case name: Ignacio Carlos Flores-Figueroa, Petitioner v. United States
- Docket no.: 08-108
- Citations: 556 U.S. 646 (more) 129 S. Ct. 1886; 173 L. Ed. 2d 853; 2009 U.S. LEXIS 3305

Case history
- Prior: Defendant convicted (S.D. Iowa 2008); affirmed, 274 F. App'x 501 (8th Cir. 2008); cert. granted, 555 U.S. 969 (2008).

Holding
- The "knowingly" requirement for the federal crime of aggravated identity theft requires that the defendant knew that the false identification he used actually belonged to another person.

Court membership
- Chief Justice John Roberts Associate Justices John P. Stevens · Antonin Scalia; Anthony Kennedy · David Souter; Clarence Thomas · Ruth Bader Ginsburg; Stephen Breyer · Samuel Alito

Case opinions
- Majority: Breyer, joined by Roberts, Stevens, Kennedy, Souter, Ginsburg
- Concurrence: Scalia (in judgment), joined by Thomas
- Concurrence: Alito (in judgment)

Laws applied
- 18 U.S.C. § 1028A(a)(1)

Flores-Figueroa v. United States, 556 U.S. 646 (2009), was a decision by the Supreme Court of the United States, holding that the law enhancing the sentence for identity theft requires proof that an individual knew that the identity card or number he had used belonged to another, actual person. Simply using a Social Security Number is not sufficient connection to another individual.

== Background ==
Ignacio Flores-Figueroa, an undocumented immigrant from Mexico, used a counterfeit Social Security card bearing his real name and a false Social Security number to obtain employment at a steel plant in East Moline, Illinois. Though he did not know it, the number belonged to a real person, a minor. The question in the case was whether workers who use false Social Security numbers must know that they belong to a real person to be subject to a two-year sentence extension for "aggravated identity theft."

Specifically, the case hinged on whether the adverb "knowingly" applies only to the verb or also to the object in 18 U.S.C. § 1028A(a)(1) (which defines aggravated identity theft): "Whoever [...] knowingly transfers, possesses, or uses, without lawful authority, a means of identification of another person [...]".

== Opinion of the Court ==
In a unanimous decision delivered by Justice Breyer on May 4, 2009, the Court held that a prosecutor must be able to show that a defendant knew that the identification he used actually belonged to another person.

== See also ==
- List of United States Supreme Court cases, volume 556
- Mens rea
- Morissette v. United States (1952)
