= Negusie v. Holder =

- Supreme Court of the United States

Argued November 5, 2008 Decided March 3, 2009
- Full case name: Daniel Girmai Negusie, Petitioner v. Eric H. Holder, Jr., Attorney General
- Citations: 555 U.S. 511 (more) 129 S. Ct. 1159; 173 L. Ed. 2d 20; 2009 U.S. LEXIS 1768

Case history
- Prior: Negusie v. Gonzales, 231 F. App'x 325 (5th Cir. 2007); cert. granted, 552 U.S. 1255 (2008).

Holding
- The BIA and Fifth Circuit misapplied Fedorenko as mandating that whether an alien is compelled to assist in persecution is immaterial for persecutor-bar purposes.

Court membership
- Chief Justice John Roberts Associate Justices John P. Stevens · Antonin Scalia; Anthony Kennedy · David Souter; Clarence Thomas · Ruth Bader Ginsburg; Stephen Breyer · Samuel Alito

Case opinions
- Majority: Kennedy, joined by Roberts, Scalia, Souter, Ginsburg, Alito
- Concurrence: Scalia, joined by Alito
- Concur/dissent: Stevens, joined by Breyer
- Dissent: Thomas

Laws applied
- Refugee Act of 1980

Negusie v. Holder, 555 U.S. 511 (2009), was a decision by the United States Supreme Court involving whether the bar to asylum in the United States for persecutors applies to asylum applicants who have been the target of credible threats of harm or torture in their home countries for refusing to participate further in persecution. The petitioner, Daniel Negusie, claimed he was forced to assist in the mistreatment of prisoners in Eritrea under threat of execution, and that because any assistance he rendered was provided under duress he should still be eligible for asylum.

The Court held that the Board of Immigration Appeals and United States Court of Appeals for the Fifth Circuit erred in their interpretation of the Court's holding in Fedorenko v. United States (1981) when they evaluated Daniel's asylum petition, as they presumed that an alien's claimed coercion to participate in persecution was immaterial to determining whether the "persecutor bar" applies.

== See also ==
- Fedorenko v. United States (1981)
