= Polar Tankers, Inc. v. City of Valdez =

Polar Tankers v. City of Valdez
- Supreme Court of the United States

Argued April 1, 2009 Decided June 15, 2009
- Full case name: Polar Tankers, Inc. v. City of Valdez
- Citations: 557 U.S. 1 (more) 129 S. Ct. 2277; 174 L. Ed. 2d 1

Case history
- Prior: judgment for plaintiff 3AN-00-09665 CI (Alaska Super. 2006); reversed and remanded, 182 P.3d 614 (Alaska 2008); reversed and remanded.

Holding
- The tonnage clause forbids a city with a port to levy a property tax on ships using the harbor.

Court membership
- Chief Justice John Roberts Associate Justices John P. Stevens · Antonin Scalia; Anthony Kennedy · David Souter; Clarence Thomas · Ruth Bader Ginsburg; Stephen Breyer · Samuel Alito

Case opinions
- Majority: Breyer, joined by Scalia, Kennedy, Ginsburg; Alito (all but Part II–B–2)
- Concurrence: Roberts (in part), joined by Thomas
- Concurrence: Alito (in part)
- Dissent: Stevens, joined by Souter

Polar Tankers, Inc. v. City of Valdez, 557 U.S. 1 (2009), was a decision by the Supreme Court of the United States involving the tonnage clause of the United States Constitution.

The City of Valdez in Alaska imposed a property tax that, in practice, applied only to large oil tankers. Polar Tankers, a ConocoPhillips subsidiary, sued, arguing that the tax violated the Tonnage Clause of the Constitution, which forbids a state, "without the Consent of Congress, [to] lay any Duty of Tonnage."

The Supreme Court agreed with Polar Tankers. The court noted that the original meaning of the clause was as a term of art for a tax imposed that varies with "the internal cubic capacity of a vessel," but emphasized that a consistent line of cases had read the clause broadly, "forbidding a State to do that indirectly which she is forbidden ... to do directly." Those cases, the court concluded, stood for the proposition that the tonnage clause's prohibition reaches any taxes or duties on a ship, "whether a fixed sum upon its whole tonnage, or a sum to be ascertained by comparing the amount of tonnage with the rate of duty[,] ... regardless of [the tax or duty's] name or form ... which operate to impose a charge for the privilege of entering, trading in, or lying in a port."

With this premise in mind, the court concluded that because Valdez taxes "ships and to no other property at all[,] ... in order to obtain revenue for general city purposes[, this was] ... the kind of tax that the Tonnage Clause forbids Valdez to impose without the consent of Congress, consent that Valdez lacks."
