= Cone v. Bell =

- Supreme Court of the United States

Argued December 9, 2008 Decided April 28, 2009
- Full case name: Cone v. Bell, Warden
- Docket no.: 07–1114
- Citations: 556 U.S. 449 (more) 129 S. Ct. 1769; 173 L. Ed. 2d 701

Case history
- Prior: 492 F.3d 743 (6th Cir. 2007); cert. granted, 554 U.S. 916 (2008). See Bell v. Cone, 535 U.S. 685 (2002) for additional prior history.

Holding
- Opinion of the United States Court of Appeals for the Sixth Circuit vacated and remanded to United States District Court to determine whether the prosecution's failure to disclose exculpatory evidence violated Cone's right to due process

Court membership
- Chief Justice John Roberts Associate Justices John P. Stevens · Antonin Scalia; Anthony Kennedy · David Souter; Clarence Thomas · Ruth Bader Ginsburg; Stephen Breyer · Samuel Alito

Case opinions
- Majority: Stevens, joined by Kennedy, Souter, Ginsburg, Breyer
- Concurrence: Roberts (in judgment)
- Concur/dissent: Alito
- Dissent: Thomas, joined by Scalia

Laws applied
- U. S. Const. amend. XIV

Cone v. Bell, 556 U.S. 449 (2009), was a case in which the United States Supreme Court held that a defendant was entitled to a hearing to determine whether prosecutors in his 1982 death penalty trial violated his right to due process by withholding exculpatory evidence. The defendant, Gary Cone, filed a petition for postconviction relief from a 1982 death sentence in which he argued that prosecutors violated his rights to due process under the Fourteenth Amendment by withholding police reports and witness statements that potentially could have shown that his drug addiction affected his behavior. In an opinion written by Justice John Paul Stevens, the Supreme Court held that Cone was entitled to a hearing to determine whether the prosecution's failure to disclose exculpatory evidence violated Cone's right to due process; the Court noted that "the quantity and the quality of the suppressed evidence lends support to Cone’s position at trial that he habitually used excessive amounts of drugs, that his addiction affected his behavior during his crime spree". In 2016, Gary Cone died from natural causes while still sitting on Tennessee's death row.

== Background ==
In 1982, Gary Cone was convicted and sentenced to death for a crime spree that included the robbery of a jewelry store, a police pursuit, and the murder of an elderly couple. The murdered victims were 93-year-old Shipley Todd and 79-year-old Cleopatra Todd, both of whom were killed in August 1980. At trial, Cone's attorney argued that he was not guilty by reason of insanity, and several experts testified that Cone suffered from a long history of drug abuse and post traumatic stress disorder resulting from his military service during the Vietnam War. According to one expert, Cone's long-term drug abuse caused hallucinations and paranoia that "affected respondent's mental capacity and ability to obey the law." The jury rejected Cone's insanity defense and found him guilty on all counts. At a sentencing hearing, Cone's attorney did not present evidence of Cone's drug use as mitigating evidence. Cone's attorney also waived his final argument so that the prosecutors would not have an opportunity for a rebuttal argument. The trial court ultimately sentenced Cone to death, and on appeal, the Tennessee Supreme Court affirmed Cone's convictions and sentence.

== Previous petitions for postconviction relief ==
After the Tennessee Supreme Court denied Cone's direct appeal in 1984, Cone filed a petition for postconviction relief in which he argued that his attorney provided ineffective assistance of counsel by waiving his closing argument and by failing to present mitigating evidence during the sentencing phase of his trial. After conducting a hearing on Cone's petition, a Tennessee state court rejected Cone's contentions, and the Tennessee Court of Criminal Appeals affirmed the lower court's ruling. The Tennessee Court of Criminal Appeals concluded that Cone's attorney acted within an acceptable range of competency and that Cone "received the death penalty based on the law and facts, not on the shortcomings of counsel." Both the Tennessee Supreme Court and the United States Supreme Court declined to consider further appeals.

In 1997, Cone filed a petition for a writ of habeas corpus in federal court. In his petition, he alleged that his attorney provided ineffective assistance of counsel during the sentencing phase of his trial, but the federal district court denied his petition. On appeal, the United States Court of Appeals for the Sixth Circuit affirmed the district court's ruling with respect to Cone's conviction, but it revered the district court's ruling with respect to Cone's sentence. The Sixth Circuit held that Cone "suffered a Sixth Amendment violation for which prejudice should be presumed" because his attorney's failure to ask for mercy "did not subject the State's call for the death penalty to meaningful adversarial testing." Additionally, the Sixth Circuit held that the Tennessee Court of Criminal Appeals decision constituted "an unreasonable application of the clearly established law". In 2001, the United States Supreme Court granted certiorari.

=== Bell v. Cone ===
In Bell v. Cone, in an opinion written by Chief Justice William Rehnquist, the Supreme Court reversed the Sixth Circuit's ruling and remanded the case to the Sixth Circuit for further proceedings. Chief Justice Rehnquist stated that the Tennessee state court correctly identified Strickland v. Washington's two-part test as the proper legal standard for effective assistance of counsel when it rejected Cone's petition for postconviction relief. Citing various "tactical reasons" why Cone's attorney did not present mitigating evidence, Chief Justice Rehnquist concluded that the jury still had an opportunity to consider whether "evidence of a mental disease or defect" should mitigate Cone's ultimate sentence. Justice John Paul Stevens wrote a dissenting opinion in which he argued that Cone's attorney "entirely fail[ed] to subject the prosecution's case to meaningful adversarial testing."

=== Further proceedings in the United States Court of Appeals for the Sixth Circuit ===
On remand, the Sixth Circuit ordered a new sentencing hearing "based on the purported invalidity of an aggravating circumstance found by the jury." In a per curiam opinion, Bell v. Cone (2005), the United States Supreme Court again reversed the Sixth Circuit's decision. The case then returned to the Sixth Circuit for a third time. In a 2007 opinion, the Sixth Circuit reconsidered whether the prosecution violated Cone's rights to due process under the Fourteenth Amendment by withholding police reports and witness statements that potentially could have corroborated his claims about the effects of his drug use. The Sixth Circuit rejected Cone's claims, holding the due process claims were procedurally barred by the Tennessee state courts in prior proceedings. The Sixth Circuit noted that even if the police reports and witness statements were admitted, they would not outweigh "overwhelming evidence of Cone’s guilt in committing a brutal double murder and the persuasive testimony that Cone was not under the influence of drugs."

== Opinion of the Court ==
The United States Supreme Court granted certiorari and vacated the Sixth Circuit's 2007 ruling. In an opinion written by Justice John Paul Stevens, the Supreme Court held that Cone's due process claims should not have been procedurally barred, and the Supreme Court remanded the case to the United States District Court that first examined Cone's habeas petition, "with instructions to give full consideration to the merits of Cone’s [due process] claim." Justice Stevens noted that "the quantity and the quality of the suppressed evidence lends support to Cone’s position at trial that he habitually used excessive amounts of drugs, that his addiction affected his behavior during his crime spree, and that the State’s arguments to the contrary were false and misleading." On April 19, 2016, Gary Cone died of natural causes while still sitting on Tennessee's death row.

== See also ==
- List of United States Supreme Court cases, volume 556
- List of United States Supreme Court cases
- Lists of United States Supreme Court cases by volume
- List of United States Supreme Court cases by the Roberts Court
