= Yeager v. United States =

- Supreme Court of the United States

Decided June 18, 2009
- Full case name: Yeager v. United States
- Citations: 557 U.S. 110 (more)

Holding
- Even when there is an apparent inconsistency between a jury's verdict of acquittal on some counts and its failure to return a verdict on other counts, the Double Jeopardy Clause prevents the government from relitigating facts that were necessarily decided by the acquittals in future prosecutions.

Court membership
- Chief Justice John Roberts Associate Justices John P. Stevens · Antonin Scalia; Anthony Kennedy · David Souter; Clarence Thomas · Ruth Bader Ginsburg; Stephen Breyer · Samuel Alito

Case opinions
- Majority: Stevens
- Concurrence: Kennedy (in part)
- Dissent: Scalia, joined by Thomas, Alito
- Dissent: Alito, joined by Scalia, Thomas

Yeager v. United States, 557 U.S. 110 (2009), was a United States Supreme Court case in which the court held that even when there is an apparent inconsistency between a jury's verdict of acquittal on some counts and its failure to return a verdict on other counts, the Double Jeopardy Clause prevents the government from relitigating facts that were necessarily decided by the acquittals in future prosecutions.

== Background ==
A federal indictment charged Yeager with securities and wire fraud for allegedly misleading the public about the virtues of a fiber-optic telecommunications system offered by his employer, a subsidiary of Enron, and with insider trading for selling his Enron stock while in possession of material, nonpublic information about the new system's performance and value to Enron. The indictment also charged Yeager with money laundering for conducting various transactions with the proceeds of his stock sales. The jury acquitted Yeager on the fraud counts but failed to reach a verdict on the insider-trading and money-laundering counts.

After the government recharged him with some of the insider-trading and money-laundering counts, Yeager moved to dismiss the charges on the ground that the jury, by acquitting him on the fraud counts, had necessarily decided that he did not possess material, nonpublic information about the project's performance and value, and that the issue-preclusion component of the Double Jeopardy Clause therefore barred a second trial for insider trading and money laundering. The federal District Court denied the motion, and the Fifth Circuit Court of Appeals affirmed, reasoning that the fact that the jury hung on the insider-trading and money-laundering counts—as opposed to acquitting petitioner—cast doubt on whether it had necessarily decided that petitioner did not possess material, nonpublic information. This inconsistency between the acquittals and the hung counts, the Fifth Circuit concluded, meant that the Government could prosecute petitioner anew for insider trading and money laundering.

== Opinion of the court ==
The Supreme Court issued an opinion on June 18, 2009. The court said the case's result was required under Ashe v. Swenson.
