= Carlsbad Technology, Inc. v. HIF Bio, Inc. =

- Supreme Court of the United States

Decided May 4, 2009
- Full case name: Carlsbad Technology, Inc. v. HIF Bio, Inc.
- Citations: 556 U.S. 635 (more)

Holding
- A district court's order remanding a case to state court after declining to exercise supplemental jurisdiction over state-law claims is not a remand for lack of subject-matter jurisdiction. Therefore, the denial may be appealed within the federal system.

Court membership
- Chief Justice John Roberts Associate Justices John P. Stevens · Antonin Scalia; Anthony Kennedy · David Souter; Clarence Thomas · Ruth Bader Ginsburg; Stephen Breyer · Samuel Alito

Case opinions
- Majority: Thomas, joined by unanimous
- Concurrence: Stevens
- Concurrence: Scalia
- Concurrence: Breyer, joined by Souter

Carlsbad Technology, Inc. v. HIF Bio, Inc., 556 U.S. 635 (2009), was a United States Supreme Court case in which the court held that a federal district court's order remanding a case to state court after declining to exercise supplemental jurisdiction over state-law claims is not a remand for lack of subject-matter jurisdiction. Therefore, the denial may be appealed within the federal system.

== Background ==
HIR Bio filed a state-court suit alleging that Carlsbad Technology had violated state and federal law in connection with a patent dispute. After removing the case to federal District Court under 28 U. S. C. §1441(c), which allows removal if the case includes at least one claim over which the federal court has original jurisdiction, Carlsbad moved to dismiss the suit's only federal claim, which arose under the Racketeer Influenced and Corrupt Organizations Act (RICO). Agreeing that HIF Bio had failed to state a RICO claim upon which relief could be granted, the District Court dismissed the claim; declined to exercise supplemental jurisdiction over the remaining state-law claims under §1367(c)(3), which allows such a course if the court "has dismissed all claims over which it has original jurisdiction"; and remanded the case to state court. The Federal Circuit dismissed Carlsbad's appeal, finding that the remand order could be colorably characterized as based on a "lack of subject matter jurisdiction" over the state-law claims, §1447(c), and was therefore "not reviewable on appeal," §1447(d).

== Opinion of the court ==
The Supreme Court issued an opinion on May 4, 2009. The Supreme Court reversed, holding that the Federal Circuit had subject-matter jurisdiction over the subject-matter-jurisdiction appeal.
