= Harbison v. Bell =

- Supreme Court of the United States

Argued January 12, 2009 Decided April 1, 2009
- Full case name: Edward Jerome Harbison v. Ricky Bell, Warden
- Docket no.: 07-8521
- Citations: 556 U.S. 180 (more) 129 S. Ct. 1481; 173 L. Ed. 2d 347
- Argument: Oral argument

Case history
- Procedural: Writ of certiorari to United States Court of Appeals for the Sixth Circuit

Holding
- Indigent death row inmates sentenced under state law have a right to federally funded habeas counsel in post-conviction state clemency proceedings, when the state has denied such counsel.

Court membership
- Chief Justice John Roberts Associate Justices John P. Stevens · Antonin Scalia; Anthony Kennedy · David Souter; Clarence Thomas · Ruth Bader Ginsburg; Stephen Breyer · Samuel Alito

Case opinions
- Majority: Stevens, joined by Kennedy, Souter, Ginsburg, Breyer
- Concurrence: Roberts
- Concurrence: Thomas
- Concur/dissent: Scalia, joined by Alito

Laws applied
- 28 U.S.C. Section 2254; 18 U.S.C. Section 3599

Harbison v. Bell, 556 U.S. 180 (2009), was a decision by the Supreme Court of the United States that held that federal law gave indigent death row inmates the right to federally appointed counsel to represent them in post-conviction state clemency proceedings, when the state has declined to do so. Certiorari was granted by the Supreme Court on June 23, 2008.

== Opinion ==
Justice Stevens delivered the judgment of the court, stating:

§3599 authorizes federally appointed counsel to represent their clients in state clemency proceedings and entitles them to compensation for that representation. Accordingly, the judgment of the Court of Appeals is reversed.

— Justice John Paul Stevens

== Subsequent developments ==
The death sentence of Edward Harbison was commuted to life imprisonment without parole by Tennessee Governor Phil Breseden in January 2011, shortly before Breseden left office.

Justice Scalia dissented in substance:

§3599 contains no express language limiting its application to proceedings in a federal forum. And yet Harbison, the Government, and the Court all read part of that section to refer to federal proceedings only. The Court's refusal to extend that limitation to the entirety of §3599 is untenable. It lacks a textual basis and has the additional misfortune of producing absurd results, which the majority attempts to avoid by doing further violence to the statutory text. I would read the statute as providing federal counsel to capital convicts appearing in a federal forum, and I accordingly would affirm the judgment of the Sixth Circuit.

— Justice Antonin Scalia

== See also ==
- List of United States Supreme Court decisions on capital punishment
