= Forum (law) =

Designated space for public expression in the United States

In a legal context, a forum is a place or type of legal institution where a legal action such as a trial can take place. (Note: Cf. also the concept of "forum shopping".) In the constitutional law of the United States, a forum is also a property that is open to public expression and assembly.

== Types ==
Forums are classified as public or nonpublic.

=== Public forum ===
A public forum, also called an open forum, is open to all expression that is protected under the First Amendment. Streets, parks, and sidewalks are considered open to public discourse by tradition and are regarded as traditional public forums. The government creates a designated public forum when it intentionally opens a nontraditional forum for public discourse. Limited public forums, such as municipal meeting rooms, are nonpublic forums that have been specifically designated by the government as open to certain groups or topics. Traditional public forums cannot be changed to nonpublic forums by governments.

The use of public forums generally cannot be restricted based on the content of the speech expressed by the user. Use can be restricted based on content, however, if the restriction passes a strict scrutiny test for a traditional and designated forum or the reasonableness test for a limited forum. Also, public forums can be restricted as to the time, place and manner of speech. In the 1972 case Grayned v. City of Rockford, the Supreme Court found that "The nature of a place, the pattern of its normal activities, dictate the kinds of regulations of time, place, and manner that are reasonable." In determining what is reasonable, the Court stated that "[the] crucial question is whether the manner of expression is basically incompatible with the normal activity of a particular place at a particular time." Thus, protesters have the right to march in support of a cause, but not on a public beach during the middle of the day with bullhorns.

=== Nonpublic forums ===
A nonpublic forum is not specially designated as open to public expression. For example, jails, public schools, and military bases are nonpublic forums (unless declared otherwise by the government). Such forums can be restricted based on the content (i.e., subject matter) of the speech, but not based on viewpoint. Thus, while the government could prohibit speeches related to abortion on a military base, it could not permit an anti-abortion speaker while denying an abortion rights speaker (or vice versa).

Regardless of the type of forum, any exclusion must be done on a viewpoint neutral basis. Exclusion based on the speaker's viewpoint is unconstitutional.

== Forum analysis versus government speech doctrine ==
In several important cases, courts have decided that what appeared to be viewpoint-based censorship in a forum was actually the government's tailoring of its own speech, which need not be viewpoint neutral, and that no forum was in fact created. When a governmental entity, such as a public broadcaster, employs the speech of ordinary citizens to further its goals, the government speech doctrine blocks citizens' First Amendment claims that the government set up a forum for them, and unconstitutionally suppressed speech in it.

== History ==
Prior to the legal development of substantive due process, state governments had the authority to regulate speech in public places without regard to the First Amendment. In the 1895 Massachusetts Supreme Judicial Court case Massachusetts v. Davis, Justice Oliver Wendell Holmes wrote that "For the Legislature absolutely or conditionally to forbid public speaking in a highway or public park is no more an infringement of the rights of a member of the public than for the owner of a private house to forbid it in his house." The Supreme Court unanimously upheld Holmes' opinion in the 1897 appeal Davis v. Massachusetts.

However, in 1939, Justice Owen Josephus Roberts stated that "use of the streets and public places has, from ancient times, been a part of the privileges [...] of citizens". And in 1965, Professor Harry Kalven described such places as a "public forum that the citizen can commandeer".

== Usage ==
The 1988 decision in Hazelwood v. Kuhlmeier relied on the notion of a public forum in determining the degree to which a public school newspaper that has not been determined as such a forum can be protected by the First Amendment. The Court decided that such newspapers are subject to a lower level of First Amendment protection than independent student newspapers established (by policy or practice) as forums for student expression.

== See also ==
- Freedom of speech in the United States#Time, place, and manner restrictions
- Public sphere

== Citations ==
- Black, Henry Campbell (2001). Bryan A. Garner (ed.). Black's Law Dictionary (Second Pocket ed.). St. Paul, Minnesota: West Group. ISBN 0-314-25791-8.
- Barron, Jerome A.; C. Thomas Dienes (2000). First Amendment Law: In A Nutshell (2nd ed.). St. Paul, Minnesota: West Group. ISBN 0-314-22677-X.
