= Bartlett v. Strickland =

- Supreme Court of the United States

Argued October 14, 2008 Decided March 9, 2009
- Full case name: Gary Bartlett, Executive Director of the North Carolina State Board of Elections, et al., Petitioners v. Dwight Strickland, et al.
- Citations: 556 U.S. 1 (more) 129 S. Ct. 1231; 173 L. Ed. 2d 173; 2009 U.S. LEXIS 1842

Case history
- Prior: Certiorari to the Supreme Court of North Carolina

Holding
- A minority group must constitute a numerical majority of the voting-age population in an area before section 2 of the Voting Rights Act requires the creation of a legislative district to prevent dilution of that group's votes.

Court membership
- Chief Justice John Roberts Associate Justices John P. Stevens · Antonin Scalia; Anthony Kennedy · David Souter; Clarence Thomas · Ruth Bader Ginsburg; Stephen Breyer · Samuel Alito

Case opinions
- Plurality: Kennedy, joined by Roberts, Alito
- Concurrence: Thomas (in judgment), joined by Scalia
- Dissent: Souter, joined by Stevens, Ginsburg, Breyer
- Dissent: Ginsburg
- Dissent: Breyer

Laws applied
- Voting Rights Act § 2

Bartlett v. Strickland, 556 U.S. 1 (2009), is a United States Supreme Court case in which a plurality of the Court held that a minority group must constitute a numerical majority of the voting-age population in an area before section 2 of the Voting Rights Act requires the creation of a legislative district to prevent dilution of that group's votes.

The decision struck down a North Carolina redistricting plan that attempted to preserve minority voting power in a 39% black North Carolina House of Representatives district.

Justice Kennedy delivered the decision and was joined by Justices Alito and Roberts. Justice Thomas filed a concurring opinion that was joined by Justice Scalia. Justice Souter filed a dissenting opinion that was joined by Justices Stevens, Ginsburg, and Breyer. Justices Ginsburg and Breyer also filed separate dissenting opinions.

Justice Thomas argued that Section 2 does not protect against vote dilution, a position that he still holds as of 2023.

Justice Souter discussed how minority voters can elect their representatives of choice by winning crossover white voters despite not having an outright majority. Souter expressed concern that the majority's holding could lead to promoting racial blocs in order to create a minority-majority district when such a situation could be remedied by creating a crossover district. Justice Ginsburg called on Congress to amend Section 2 to supersede this ruling. Justice Breyer wrote that a flat 50% rule is impractical because no voting groups are 100% cohesive.

Despite not having a black majority, the black population in that district showed that it could elect candidates of its choice due to crossover white voters. A commentator warned "Under the Court’s ruling, for example, there is a danger that a jurisdiction may attempt to pack as many minority voters as possible into districts that are already safe majority-minority districts as an intentional effort to dilute minority voting strength in neighboring crossover districts, and thereby prevent minority voters in those districts from electing their candidates of choice. Similarly, if a compact minority population is electing candidates of its choice in a crossover district, a jurisdiction may respond by fragmenting that minority population into multiple districts in which minority voters would have no opportunity to elect their preferred candidates".

== See also ==
- Thornburg v. Gingles, 478 U.S. 30 (1986)
