= Federal crime in the United States =

Actions made illegal by Congress

Federal Bureau of Investigation Seal. The FBI is the main agency responsible for investigating federal offenses.

In the United States, a federal crime or federal offense is an act that is made illegal by U.S. federal legislation enacted by both the United States Senate and United States House of Representatives and signed into law by the president. Prosecution happens at both the federal and the state levels (based on the Dual sovereignty doctrine) and so a "federal crime" is one that is prosecuted under federal criminal law and not under state criminal law under which most of the crimes committed in the United States are prosecuted.

That includes many acts which, if they did not occur on U.S. federal property or on Indian reservations or were not specifically penalized, would either not be crimes or fall under state or local law. Some crimes are listed in Title 18 of the United States Code (the federal criminal and penal code), but others fall under other titles. For instance, tax evasion and possession of weapons banned by the National Firearms Act are criminalized in Title 26 of the United States Code.

Numerous federal agencies have been granted powers to investigate federal offenses, including the Bureau of Alcohol, Tobacco, Firearms, and Explosives, the Drug Enforcement Administration, the Federal Bureau of Investigation, the U.S. Immigration and Customs Enforcement, the Internal Revenue Service, and the Secret Service.

Other federal crimes include mail fraud, aircraft hijacking, carjacking, kidnapping, lynching, bank robbery, child pornography, credit card fraud, identity theft, computer crimes, federal hate crimes, animal cruelty, violations of the Federal Racketeer Influenced and Corrupt Organizations Act (RICO), obscenity, tax evasion, counterfeiting, violations of the Espionage Act, violations of the Patriot Act (pre-2020), illegal wiretapping, art theft from a museum, damaging or destroying public mailboxes, electoral fraud, immigration offenses, and since 1965 in the aftermath of President John F. Kennedy's assassination, assassinating or attempting assassination of the President or Vice President.

In drug and child sex-related federal offenses, mandatory minimums can be enforced if federal law is implicated, when a defendant manufactures, sells, imports/exports, traffic, or cultivate illegal controlled substances across state boundaries or national borders. A mandatory minimum is a federally regulated minimum sentence for offenses relating to certain drugs and child sex crimes.

Prosecution guidelines are established by the United States Attorney in each federal judicial district and by laws that Congress has already established.

== See also ==
- Classes of offenses under United States federal law
- Federal Air Marshal Service (FAMS)
- Federal Bureau of Prisons (BOP)
- Federal prosecution of public corruption in the United States
- Federal public defender
- Law of the United States
- United States Border Patrol
- United States criminal law
- United States Customs and Border Protection (CBP)
- United States Federal Sentencing Guidelines
- United States Marshals Service (USMS)
- United States Postal Inspection Service (USPIS)
