= Fleeting expletive =

Non-scripted verbal profanity expressed on a live broadcast

A fleeting expletive is a non-scripted verbal profanity or obscenity expressed and broadcast during a live television broadcast or radio broadcast. The term appears primarily in discussions of United States broadcasting law.

== Notable examples ==
Here's an incomplete list in chronological order:

- While accepting her Lifetime Achievement Award at the 2002 Billboard Music Awards, Cher said "fuck 'em" regarding those she felt had criticized her throughout her career.
- During the January 2003 Golden Globe Awards, Bono accepted an award exclaiming, "This is really, really, fucking brilliant."
- At the December 2003 Billboard Music Awards, Nicole Richie said, "Have you ever tried to get cowshit out of a Prada purse? It's not so fucking simple."
- In NASCAR, Victory Lane interviews had a history of drivers and pit crew members swearing on live television. Some examples include Chad Knaus, the crew chief for NASCAR driver Jimmie Johnson, was fined $5,000 by NASCAR for cursing during an interview following Johnson's victory in the 2002 MBNA Platinum 400 at Dover Motor Speedway on June 2 of that same year. NASCAR driver Dale Earnhardt Jr. following his win at the 2004 EA Sports 500 at Talladega Superspeedway stated "It don't mean shit right now, daddy's won here 10 times." He was asked what he felt about winning at the track for the fifth time, with "Daddy" being a reference to his father Dale Earnhardt. He was later fined $10,000 by NASCAR and lost 25 points in the 2004 NASCAR Nextel Cup Series due to the comment. And in the following year, Tony Stewart was also fined $25,000 and docked 25 points by NASCAR after cursing during his television interview following his win at the 2005 Brickyard 400 in Indianapolis.
- During a live postgame broadcast of January 5, 2007, Johnathan Toews from TSN Hockey told reporter James Cybulski that "the Canadians did a fucking great job" after defeating Russia in the 2007 World Junior Ice Hockey Championships.
- On an August 2008 episode of Big Brother 10, there was a heated argument with many muted expletives; however, one went through when someone said, "Memphis was in the fucking room". The word aired uncensored through all CBS stations.
- Jenny Slate said "and I fucking love you for that" during a parody of a talk show by biker women. It was her first appearance as a player on Saturday Night Live.
- On March 23, 2010, U.S. Vice President Joe Biden, commenting on the passage of the Patient Protection and Affordable Care Act during a live press conference, said to U.S. President Barack Obama, "This is a big fucking deal." The comment was picked up by CNN news hot mics.
- On November 19, 2011, during a live taping of ESPN's College GameDay at the University of Houston, college football analyst Lee Corso said, "Ah, fuck it" before he put on the headwear of Shasta, the University of Houston Cougars' mascot, demonstrating his prediction that the Cougars would beat the Mustangs of Southern Methodist University. Corso's co-hosts Kirk Herbstreit and Chris Fowler and their guest speaker Carl Lewis laughed hysterically in response to his use of the expletive, for which Corso later apologized.
- On December 18, 2011, during a CBS broadcast of the Cincinnati Bengals at the St. Louis Rams, St. Louis guard Harvey Dahl protested referee Jerome Boger's holding call against him by saying, "I know you didn't just call me for holding. That's not fuckin' holding!" It was heard over the stadium PA system through Boger's open microphone, and aired. CBS commentator Dan Dierdorf apologized for the slip, and Dahl was assessed a second penalty for unsportsmanlike conduct.
- On November 4, 2012, during the Dolphins-Colts game at Lucas Oil Stadium in Indianapolis, referee Tony Corrente loudly said, "God damn it!" CBS play-by-play announcer Kevin Harlan apologized on-air because Corrente's illegal language slipped past the censors. Corrente himself would apologize, but not before the National Football League fined him a game check.
- On April 20, 2013, during a passionate pre-game speech dedicated to the victims of the Boston Marathon bombing, Boston Red Sox player David Ortiz said, "This is our fucking city." FCC chairman Julius Genachowski later tweeted from the official page of the organization, saying "David Ortiz spoke from the heart at today's Red Sox game. I stand with Big Papi and the people of Boston." Although 25 complaints were lodged with the FCC, no action was taken and neither Ortiz nor the Boston Red Sox were fined for using the expletive.
- On October 28, 2017, during Game 4 of the 2017 World Series matchup between the Houston Astros and the Los Angeles Dodgers at Minute Maid Park in Houston, Astros player Brian McCann used "Fuck" after being struck-out by Dodgers pitcher Alex Wood. The word was picked up on a FOX camera.
- On November 6, 2018, during his concession speech, Beto O'Rourke said, "I'm so fucking proud of you guys!" after losing a Senate election to Ted Cruz. It was aired on live television, and MSNBC later apologized for this occurrence. "Sorry for the F-bomb," said Brian Williams, a news anchor.
- On January 7, 2021, in the wake of the 2021 United States Capitol attack, Joe Scarborough, on his show Morning Joe, accused the United States Capitol Police of not stopping the rioters, saying "[...] then Trump supporters come in, and you open the FUCKING doors for them".
- On May 24, 2022, in the wake of the Robb Elementary School shooting, activist Fred Guttenberg decried "They fucking failed our kids again" on Deadline: White House.
- On February 19, 2026, upon completion of her free skate program at the 2026 Winter Olympics, figure skater Alysa Liu exclaimed "That's what I'm fucking talking about", uncensored through all NBC stations.
- During the September 20, 2026 NFL game between the Washington Commanders and the Dallas Cowboys at AT&T Stadium, Fox commentator and seven-time Super Bowl champion Tom Brady said "Oh shit" on live television after Commanders quarterback Jayden Daniels suffered a left elbow injury at the end of the first half.

=== On local television ===
- On May 12, 2008, as a live news teaser was played on WNBC-TV in New York City, longtime WNBC news anchor Sue Simmons was heard loudly exclaiming, "The fuck are you doing?" over a shot of an active ferry crossing through the Upper Bay. It was later revealed that her remark was directed at distracted co-anchor Chuck Scarborough. After a commercial break, Simmons apologized on-air for her inappropriate language.

== Legal status ==
=== U.S. Supreme Court case (2008) ===
On March 17, 2008, the United States Supreme Court agreed to hear, in September 2008, a case on whether the Federal Communications Commission (FCC) is allowed to regulate the use of fleeting expletives on television broadcasts. The parties in the case are the Fox Broadcasting Company (supported by other television networks including ABC, CBS, and NBC) and the FCC. A federal appeals court ruled in favor of the networks, but the Supreme Court agreed to hear the FCC's appeal.

In a ruling issued April 28, 2009, the United States Supreme Court ruled to uphold the Federal Communications Commission (FCC) fleeting expletive rule. The court reversed a lower court ruling in the 2nd U.S. Circuit Court of Appeals in New York which found in favor of Fox Television that the FCC had not properly followed procedures in creating the rule. In the 5–4 ruling by Justice Antonin Scalia, "the court did not definitively settle the First Amendment implications of allowing a federal agency to censor broadcasts." Instead the court suggested the First Amendment issue should be raised in a Federal Appeals Court.

=== U.S. Second Circuit Court of Appeals (2010) ===
In a ruling announced July 13, 2010, the U.S. Second Circuit Court of Appeals struck down the FCC indecency policy on fleeting expletives. Calling it "unconstitutionally vague", the unanimous three-judge panel found the policy could infringe upon the constitutionally protected First Amendment freedom of speech. According to the panel, the policy "created a chilling effect that goes far beyond the fleeting expletives at issue here", in part due to a lack of guidance on what content is considered offensive.

Fox released a statement stating, "We have always felt that the government's position on fleeting expletives was unconstitutional," and, "While we will continue to strive to eliminate expletives from live broadcasts, the inherent challenges broadcasters face with live television, coupled with the human element required for monitoring, must allow for the unfortunate isolated instances where inappropriate language slips through."

FCC Chairman Julius Genachowski indicated the commission will be "reviewing the court's decision in light of our commitment to protect children, empower parents, and uphold the First Amendment."

=== U.S. Supreme Court ruling (2012) ===
In June 2012, the Supreme Court rescinded several fines issued by the FCC regarding indecent content, including the Fox case stemming from the 2002 Billboard Music Awards. The court ruled that the FCC's change in enforcement policy to target fleeting instances of profanities and nudity on television was too vague, thus violating their rights to due process. The court did not address the policies themselves.

== Canadian Broadcast Standards Council opinion ==
In cases of live microphones capturing profanities used by players during a football game, the Canadian Broadcast Standards Council (CBSC) adopted the opinion that under the Code of Ethics of the Canadian Association of Broadcasters, "given the goal of 'ensuring a 'safe haven' for audiences uncomfortable with the use of coarse or offensive language' some efforts need to be made to reconcile the potential for adult content", including viewer advisories.

== See also ==
- Wardrobe malfunction, for fleeting nudity
- Watershed (broadcasting)
