= 2008 term opinions of the Supreme Court of the United States =

October 2008 to October 2009 opinions

The 2008 term of the Supreme Court of the United States began October 6, 2008, and concluded October 4, 2009. The table illustrates which opinion was filed by each justice in each case and which justices joined each opinion.

== Table key ==
- Delivered the court's opinion
- Joined the court's opinion
- Filed a concurrence
- Joined a concurrence
- Filed a dissent
- Joined a dissent
- Filed a concurrence/dissent
- Joined a concurrence/dissent
- Did not participate in the decision
- Decisions that do not note an argument date were decided without oral argument. Decisions that do not note a justice delivering the court's opinion are per curiam.
- Multiple concurrences and dissents within a case are numbered, with joining votes numbered accordingly. Justices frequently join multiple opinions in a single case; each vote is subdivided accordingly.
- An asterisk ( * ) in the court's opinion denotes that it was only a majority in part or a plurality. An asterisk in a joining vote denotes that the justice joined it only in part.
- A dash ( - ) denotes that the justice voted without filing or joining an opinion.

== 2008 term opinions ==
#	Case name and citation	Argued	Decided	Roberts	Stevens	Scalia	Kennedy	Souter	Thomas	Ginsburg	Breyer	Alito
1	Moore v. United States, 555 U.S. 1		October 14, 2008									
2	Brunner v. Ohio Republican Party, 555 U.S. 5		October 17, 2008									
3	Winter v. Natural Resources Defense Council, Inc., 555 U.S. 7	October 8, 2008	November 12, 2008		*							
4	Bell v. Kelly, 555 U.S. 55	November 12, 2008	November 17, 2008									
5	Hedgpeth v. Pulido, 555 U.S. 57		December 2, 2008									
6	Altria Group, Inc. v. Good, 555 U.S. 70	October 6, 2008	December 15, 2008									
7	Jimenez v. Quarterman, 555 U.S. 113	November 4, 2008	January 13, 2009									
8	Chambers v. United States, 555 U.S. 122	November 10, 2008	January 13, 2009									
9	Herring v. United States, 555 U.S. 135	October 7, 2008	January 14, 2009		1			1 2		1	1 2	
10	Oregon v. Ice, 555 U.S. 160	October 14, 2008	January 14, 2009									
11	Waddington v. Sarausad, 555 U.S. 179	October 15, 2008	January 21, 2009									
12	Locke v. Karass, 555 U.S. 207	October 6, 2008	January 21, 2009									
13	Pearson v. Callahan, 555 U.S. 223	October 14, 2008	January 21, 2009									
14	Fitzgerald v. Barnstable School Committee, 555 U.S. 246	December 2, 2008	January 21, 2009									
15	Spears v. United States, 555 U.S. 261		January 21, 2009	1					-			1
16	Crawford v. Nashville, 555 U.S. 271	October 8, 2008	January 26, 2009									
17	Kennedy v. Plan Administrator for DuPont Sav. and Investment Plan, 555 U.S. 285	October 7, 2008	January 26, 2009									
18	United States v. Eurodif S. A., 555 U.S. 305	November 4, 2008	January 26, 2009									
19	Arizona v. Johnson, 555 U.S. 323	December 9, 2008	January 26, 2009									
20	Van de Kamp v. Goldstein, 555 U.S. 335	November 5, 2008	January 26, 2009									
21	Nelson v. United States, 555 U.S. 350		January 26, 2009									
22	Ysursa v. Pocatello Ed. Assn., 555 U.S. 353	November 3, 2008	February 24, 2009		1			2		*		
23	Carcieri v. Salazar, 555 U.S. 379	November 3, 2008	February 24, 2009									
24	United States v. Hayes, 555 U.S. 415	November 10, 2008	February 24, 2009						*			
25	Pacific Bell Telephone Co. v. linkLine Communications, Inc., 555 U.S. 438	December 8, 2008	February 25, 2009									
26	Pleasant Grove City v. Summum, 555 U.S. 460	November 12, 2008	February 25, 2009		1	2		3	2	1	4	
27	Summers v. Earth Island Institute, 555 U.S. 488	October 8, 2008	March 3, 2009									
28	Negusie v. Holder, 555 U.S. 511	November 5, 2008	March 3, 2009									
29	Wyeth v. Levine, 555 U.S. 555	November 3, 2008	March 4, 2009						1		2	
30	Bartlett v. Strickland, 556 U.S. 1	October 14, 2008	March 9, 2009		1		*	1		1 2	1 3	
31	Vaden v. Discover Bank, 556 U.S. 49	October 6, 2008	March 9, 2009									
32	Vermont v. Brillon, 556 U.S. 81	January 13, 2009	March 9, 2009									
33	Kansas v. Colorado, 556 U.S. 98	December 1, 2008	March 9, 2009									
34	Knowles v. Mirzayance, 556 U.S. 111	January 13, 2009	March 24, 2009			*		*		*		
35	Puckett v. United States, 556 U.S. 129	January 14, 2009	March 25, 2009									
36	Rivera v. Illinois, 556 U.S. 148	February 23, 2009	March 31, 2009									
37	Hawaii v. Office of Hawaiian Affairs, 556 U.S. 163	February 25, 2009	March 31, 2009									
38	Philip Morris USA Inc. v. Williams, 556 U.S. 178	December 3, 2008	March 31, 2009									
39	Harbison v. Bell, 556 U.S. 180	January 12, 2009	April 1, 2009	1					2			
40	Entergy Corp. v. Riverkeeper, Inc., 556 U.S. 208	December 2, 2008	April 1, 2009									
41	14 Penn Plaza LLC v. Pyett, 556 U.S. 247	December 1, 2008	April 1, 2009		1 2			2		2	2	
42	United States v. Navajo Nation (2009), 556 U.S. 287	February 23, 2009	April 6, 2009									
43	Corley v. United States, 556 U.S. 303	January 21, 2009	April 6, 2009									
44	Arizona v. Gant, 556 U.S. 332	October 7, 2008	April 21, 2009	2			2				1 2*	2
45	Ministry of Defense and Support for Armed Forces of Iran v. Elahi, 556 U.S. 366	January 12, 2009	April 21, 2009				*	*		*		
46	Shinseki v. Sanders, 556 U.S. 396	December 8, 2008	April 21, 2009									
47	Nken v. Holder, 556 U.S. 418	January 21, 2009	April 22, 2009									
48	Cone v. Bell, 556 U.S. 449	December 9, 2008	April 28, 2009									
49	FCC v. Fox Television Stations, Inc., 556 U.S. 502	November 4, 2008	April 28, 2009		1 3	*	* 1	3	2	2 3	3	
50	Dean v. United States, 556 U.S. 568	March 4, 2009	April 29, 2009		1						2	
51	Kansas v. Ventris, 556 U.S. 586	January 21, 2009	April 29, 2009									
52	Burlington N. & S. F. R. Co. v. United States, 556 U.S. 599	February 24, 2009	May 4, 2009									
53	Arthur Andersen LLP v. Carlisle, 556 U.S. 624	March 3, 2009	May 4, 2009									
54	Carlsbad Technology, Inc. v. HIF Bio, Inc., 556 U.S. 635	February 24, 2009	May 4, 2009		1	2		3			3	
55	Flores-Figueroa v. United States, 556 U.S. 646	February 25, 2009	May 4, 2009			1			1			2
56	Ashcroft v. Iqbal, 556 U.S. 662	December 10, 2008	May 18, 2009		1			1		1	1 2	
57	AT&T Corp. v. Hulteen, 556 U.S. 701	December 10, 2008	May 18, 2009									
58	Haywood v. Drown, 556 U.S. 729	December 3, 2008	May 26, 2009	*		*						*
59	Montejo v. Louisiana, 556 U.S. 778	January 13, 2009	May 26, 2009		1			1		1	1* 2	
60	Abuelhawa v. United States, 556 U.S. 816	March 4, 2009	May 26, 2009									
61	Bobby v. Bies, 556 U.S. 825	April 27, 2009	June 1, 2009									
62	CSX Transp., Inc. v. Hensley, 556 U.S. 838		June 1, 2009		1					2		
63	Republic of Iraq v. Beaty, 556 U.S. 848	April 20, 2009	June 8, 2009									
64	Caperton v. A. T. Massey Coal Co., 556 U.S. 868	March 3, 2009	June 8, 2009	1		1 2			1			1
65	United States v. Denedo, 556 U.S. 904	March 25, 2009	June 8, 2009									
66	United States ex rel. Eisenstein v. City of New York, 556 U.S. 928	April 21, 2009	June 8, 2009									
67	Boyle v. United States, 556 U.S. 938	January 14, 2009	June 8, 2009									
68	Indiana State Police Pension Trust v. Chrysler LLC, 556 U.S. 960		June 9, 2009									
69	Polar Tankers, Inc. v. City of Valdez, 557 U.S. 1	April 1, 2009	June 15, 2009	1					1		*	* 2
70	Nijhawan v. Holder, 557 U.S. 29	April 27, 2009	June 15, 2009									
71	District Attorney's Office for Third Judicial Dist. v. Osborne, 557 U.S. 52	March 2, 2009	June 18, 2009		1			1* 2	*	1	1	
72	Yeager v. United States, 557 U.S. 110	March 23, 2009	June 18, 2009			1 2	*		1 2			1 2
73	Travelers Indemnity Co. v. Bailey, 557 U.S. 137	March 30, 2009	June 18, 2009									
74	Gross v. FBL Financial Services, Inc., 557 U.S. 167	March 31, 2009	June 18, 2009		1			1 2		1 2	1 2	
75	Northwest Austin Municipal Util. Dist. No. One v. Holder, 557 U.S. 193	April 29, 2009	June 22, 2009									
76	Forest Grove School Dist. v. T. A., 557 U.S. 230	April 28, 2009	June 22, 2009									
77	Coeur Alaska, Inc. v. Southeast Alaska Conservation Council, 557 U.S. 261	January 12, 2009	June 22, 2009			* 1					2	
78	Melendez-Diaz v. Massachusetts, 557 U.S. 305	November 10, 2008	June 25, 2009									
79	Safford Unified School District v. Redding, 557 U.S. 364	April 21, 2009	June 25, 2009		* 1				2	* 1 3		
80	Atlantic Sounding Co. v. Townsend, 557 U.S. 404	March 2, 2009	June 25, 2009									
81	Horne v. Flores, 557 U.S. 433	April 20, 2009	June 25, 2009									
82	Cuomo v. Clearing House Assn., L. L. C., 557 U.S. 519	April 28, 2009	June 29, 2009									
83	Ricci v. DeStefano, 557 U.S. 557	April 22, 2009	June 29, 2009			1 2			2			2
#	Case name and citation	Argued	Decided	Roberts	Stevens	Scalia	Kennedy	Souter	Thomas	Ginsburg	Breyer	Alito

== 2008 term membership and statistics ==
This was the fourth term of Chief Justice Roberts' tenure and the third and last full term with the same membership, as Justice Souter retired after the term finished.

Justice		Appointment history		Agreement with judgment		Opinions filed				
Seniority	Name	President	Date confirmed	%	#					Total
Chief Justice	John Roberts	George W. Bush	September 29, 2005	81.9%	68/83	8	4	2	3	17
Associate Justice	John Paul Stevens	Gerald Ford	December 19, 1975	62.7%	52/83	9	3	2	15	29
Associate Justice	Antonin Scalia	Ronald Reagan	September 26, 1986	84.3%	70/83	11	7	1	3	22
Associate Justice	Anthony Kennedy	Ronald Reagan	February 18, 1988	94%	78/83	7	4	1	1	13
Associate Justice	David Souter	George H. W. Bush	October 9, 1990	69.9%	58/83	8	2	1	10	21
Associate Justice	Clarence Thomas	George H. W. Bush	October 23, 1991	81.9%	68/83	9	5	3	4	21
Associate Justice	Ruth Bader Ginsburg	Bill Clinton	August 10, 1993	69.9%	58/83	7	1	1	9	18
Associate Justice	Stephen Breyer	Bill Clinton	August 3, 1994	73.5%	61/83	8	7	3	11	29
Associate Justice	Samuel Alito	George W. Bush	January 31, 2006	80.7%	67/83	7	8	1	6	22
Notes on statistics: Opinion counts only include the bench opinions listed above; opinions relating to orders or in-chambers opinions are not included.; Agreement with the Court's judgment does not guarantee agreement with the reasoning expressed in its opinion. A justice is not considered in agreement if they dissented even in part. Agreement percentages are based only on the listed cases in which a justice participated and are rounded to the nearest one-tenth of one percentage point.						Totals				
Notes on statistics: Opinion counts only include the bench opinions listed above; opinions relating to orders or in-chambers opinions are not included.; Agreement with the Court's judgment does not guarantee agreement with the reasoning expressed in its opinion. A justice is not considered in agreement if they dissented even in part. Agreement percentages are based only on the listed cases in which a justice participated and are rounded to the nearest one-tenth of one percentage point.						74	41	15	62	192
