= Rudy Bladel =

American serial killer

- Blidel c. 1979
- Born: December 8, 1932; Chicago, Illinois, U.S.
- Died: November 15, 2006 (aged 73); Foote Hospital, Jackson, Michigan, U.S.
- Other name: "The Railway Killer"
- Conviction: First degree murder (3 counts)
- Penalty: Life imprisonment

Details
- Victims: 7 (3 convictions)
- Span of crimes: 1963–1978
- Country: United States
- States: Indiana, Michigan
- Date apprehended: March 22, 1979

Rudy Bladel (December 8, 1932 – November 15, 2006), known as The Railway Killer, was an American serial killer who committed the murders of seven railway employees in the Rust Belt region from 1963 to 1978. Convicted of three of them, Bladel was sentenced to life imprisonment, and later died from thyroid cancer in 2006.

== Early life ==
Bladel was born into a railroad family with one half-brother in Chicago, on December 8, 1932. His father, Holgar, worked for the Chicago, Rock Island and Pacific Railroad company. Bladel grew up on 67th Street and Ashland Avenue, studying at the Vocational High School in the South Side, where he took automotive shop courses. After graduating in 1951, he went to work at Rock Island as a fireman, before enlisting in the army as a military engineer, to serve in the Korean War. Bladel later claimed that when he went under a routine check-up in the military, he scored an IQ of 145. While in South Korea, he "hostled" locomotives in a roundhouse, sometimes under enemy fire.

Shortly after returning from Korea, Bladel got in a motorcycle accident, the injuries of which gave him a very specific posture. Despite this, he went back to Rock Island, where he rose steadily in the company ranks. However, in 1959, the New York Central Railroad shifted its operations away from Niles, Michigan to a new yard in Elkhart, Indiana. In addition, most of the employees would be locals, leaving the previous ones from Michigan, among whom was Bladel, with a lower-rank job or were just laid off. This angered Bladel, to whom the railroad work was his entire life, to such an extent, that he decided to take revenge on the union, the Brotherhood of Locomotive Engineers and Firemen, whom he felt had sold him out.

== Crimes ==
The first killings occurred on either August 2 or 3rd, 1963, in a Hammond, Indiana yard. After failing to receive a return signal from his colleagues in the locomotive cab, 52-year-old signalman Virgil Terry decided to investigate the matter. He climbed on the engine, and noticed that 60-year-old Roy Bottorf, the engineer, and 45-year-old Paul Overstreet, the fireman, were lying dead on the controls. Both had been shot in the back of the head, with several .22 caliber shell casings being located at the scene. Terry called the police, and although they investigated the matter, no suspects were found in the murder. The only clue they had was from a witness, who had heard a motorcycle leaving the crime scene. At the time of the slayings, Bladel was living alone in a trailer in Blue Island, Illinois, and drove around with a motorcycle.

On August 6, 1968, killing 51-year-old engineer John W. Marshall, from Niles. Marshall was standing next to his diesel locomotive at the Elkhart rail yard when he was struck with close 12-gauge shotgun blasts to the midsection, the sides and twice in the head. This time, there were eyewitnesses to the murder, but they could only describe the killer by his build and strange walk.

On March 30, 1971, 38-year-old engineer Louis John Sayne, from New Buffalo, Michigan, was shot in the back twice with a .357 magnum revolver. Unlike the previous victims, however, Sayne survived, managing to wrestle the gun from his assailant's hand and fire in retaliation, wounding him in the stomach. Both men were driven to the hospital's emergency room, where Sayne recognized his attacker as one of his old workmates - Rudy Bladel. He inquired about his reasoning, with Bladel replying that he wanted "to get the Niles men out of Elkhart". On December 31, 1971, Bladel was sentenced to a one-to-five year imprisonment term at the Indiana State Prison in Michigan City for attempted murder. He was released after serving 18 months.

On April 5, 1976, another victim was claimed in the same yard at Elkhart: 51-year-old engineer James M. "Tiny" McCrory, from Niles. He had been shot in the head with a deer slug from a 20-gauge shotgun while sitting in his locomotive cab, which was parked near the diesel house.

Almost two years after this murder, Bladel was arrested by ATF authorities on January 6, 1978, after local police notified them that he had purchased a .357 magnum from South Bend. Since he was a convicted felon, he was not allowed to carry firearms, and given another one-to-five year imprisonment term, this time to be served in a federal penitentiary at Sandstone, Minnesota. He was released on November 16 of that same year.

A day before New Year's Eve in 1978, Bladel booked into a local hotel in Jackson, Michigan. With him, in a suitcase, he carried parts of a 12-gauge shotgun, purchased from an Elkhart gun shop around two years earlier. The following day, he left the hotel and went down to the depot, carrying the suitcase with him. When he arrived on the platform, he put the suitcase down, assembled the shotgun and walked towards the locker room door.

He shot 42-year-old flagman Robert Lee Blake, from Southgate, on the spot, before proceeding to also shoot 50-year-old conductor William Gulak, from Lincoln Park, who was sitting at the table. Bladel put another slug into each of them, and then headed for the door. As he was going out, he saw 32-year-old fireman Charles Lee Burton, from Jackson, peeking into the room. He then killed him as well, the shot knocking Burton on the platform behind him.

After leaving, Bladel disassembled the shotgun and hid it under some bushes at Cascade Falls. He then returned to Elkhart, where he was living at a mission for homeless men.

== Capture, trial and imprisonment ==
The Jackson murders startled the authorities, and they quickly connected them to the previous murders of railroad workers. At the time, Bladel was questioned, but released after two days for lack of evidence. In search of clues, scuba divers were deployed into the Grand River and helicopters scoured rooftops for the murder weapon. They even contacted psychics, to no avail. Three months later, the shotgun parts hidden in Cascade Falls were located, and ejection marks from spent shell casings proved it was the murder weapon. The shotgun itself was traced back to Bladel through its serial number, who by then had been reconsidered as a suspect, when his 1971 attempted murder conviction was discovered.

On March 22, 1979, charges were filed against Bladel, and he was arrested at the mission that same afternoon. He initially confessed to the Jackson murders, explaining in detail what happened, but later recanted his statements, claiming he had been coerced by the police. He additionally explained that he had gone to Jackson so he could retrieve his broken motorbike, and when it came to visiting the depot, he had only gone there to wash his hands. As for the shotgun, he claimed that it was his, but he had sold it to a stranger in Elkhart several weeks before the murders. The evidence to the contrary was enough, and Bladel was convicted for the Jackson murders, receiving a sentence of life imprisonment.

== Michigan v. Jackson ==
In 1986, the Supreme Court ruled that Bladel's case should be retried, as jurors considered that his written confession had been obtained through illegal means. Even without the confession, the jury convicted him a second time, and he was again given life imprisonment. Edward Grant, the then-prosecutor, described it as the costliest case prosecuted in Jackson County. He was one of the two respondents on whose cases Michigan v. Jackson was based. It was later overruled by the Supreme Court, following Montejo v. Louisiana.

== Death ==
On November 15, 2006, Bladel died from thyroid cancer, in the Henry Ford Allegiance Health Hospital in Jackson.

== See also ==
- List of homicides in Michigan
- List of serial killers in the United States
