= FCC v. Fox Television Stations, Inc. =

FCC v. Fox Television Stations, Inc. refers to two related Supreme Court cases:

- FCC v. Fox Television Stations, Inc. (2009), upholding regulations of the Federal Communications Commission that ban "fleeting expletives" on television broadcasts, finding they were not arbitrary and capricious under the Administrative Procedure Act
- FCC v. Fox Television Stations, Inc. (2012), continuing the 2009 case, invalidating fines because regulation at the time was "unconstitutionally vague" on "fleeting expletives"
