= Arbitration Fairness Act of 2011 =

The Arbitration Fairness Act of 2011 is a proposed law in the US Congress to reverse the effects of 14 Penn Plaza LLC v. Pyett and AT&T Mobility v. Concepcion. Both judgments held, 5 judges to 4 dissenting justices, that employees and consumers were not entitled to claim for rights in public courts if they had agreed to arbitration in a collective or individual agreement. The result has been negation of statutory rights by contract.

== Background ==
The Bill was introduced in May 2011 by Senators Richard Blumenthal (D-CT), Al Franken (D-MN) and 11 Senate co-sponsors. A companion bill was introduced in the House of Representatives [H.R. 1873] by Representative Henry “Hank” Johnson [D-GA] The bill, first introduced to Congress in 2007, leaves arbitration provisions in collective bargaining agreements between employers and labor unions unaffected “except that no such arbitration provision shall have the effect of waiving the right of an employee to seek judicial enforcement of a [federal or state law, or federal or state Constitutional] right or related public policy.

The bill would also bar the enforcement of mandatory arbitration clauses between corporations and consumers or non-union employees.

The bill‘s “findings” section states that:*Most consumers and employees have little or no meaningful choice whether to submit their claims to arbitration.

- Mandatory arbitration undermines the development of public law because there is inadequate transparency and inadequate judicial review of arbitrators’ decisions.
- Arbitration can be an acceptable alternative when consent to the arbitration is truly voluntary, and occurs after the dispute arises.

The House Judiciary Committee referred the bill to the Subcommittee on Courts, Commercial and Administrative Law on June 1, 2011. The Senate Judiciary Committee held hearings on the Arbitration Fairness Act on October 13, 2011.

== See also ==
- US labor law
- US consumer law
