= Kennedy v. Plan Administrator for DuPont Savings and Investment Plan =

- Supreme Court of the United States

Decided January 26, 2009
- Full case name: Kennedy v. Plan Administrator for DuPont Savings and Investment Plan
- Citations: 555 U.S. 285 (more)

Holding
- Because a divorcee did not attempt to direct her interest in the SIP benefits to the Estate or any other potential beneficiary, her waiver did not constitute an assignment or alienation rendered void under ERISA.

Court membership
- Chief Justice John Roberts Associate Justices John P. Stevens · Antonin Scalia; Anthony Kennedy · David Souter; Clarence Thomas · Ruth Bader Ginsburg; Stephen Breyer · Samuel Alito

Case opinion
- Majority: Souter, joined by unanimous

Kennedy v. Plan Administrator for DuPont Savings and Investment Plan, 555 U.S. 285 (2009), was a United States Supreme Court case in which the court held that because a divorcee did not attempt to direct her interest in the SIP benefits to the Estate or any other potential beneficiary, her waiver did not constitute an assignment or alienation rendered void under ERISA.

== Background ==
The Employee Retirement Income Security Act of 1974 (ERISA) obligates administrators to manage ERISA plans "in accordance with the documents and instruments governing" them, requires covered pension benefit plans to "provide that benefits … may not be assigned or alienated," and exempts from this bar qualified domestic relations orders (QDROs).

William Kennedy participated in his employer's savings and investment plan (SIP), with power both to designate a beneficiary to receive the funds upon his death and to replace or revoke that designation as prescribed by the plan administrator. Under the terms of the plan, if there is no surviving spouse or designated beneficiary at the time of death, distribution is made as directed by the estate's executor or administrator.

Upon their marriage, William designated Liv Kennedy his SIP beneficiary and named no contingent beneficiary. Their subsequent divorce decree divested Liv of her interest in the SIP benefits, but William did not execute a document removing Liv as the SIP beneficiary. On William's death, Kari Kennedy, his daughter and the executrix of his Estate, asked for the SIP funds to be distributed to the Estate, but the plan administrator relied on William's designation form and paid them to Liv. The Estate filed suit, alleging that Liv had waived her SIP benefits in the divorce and thus the employer and the SIP plan administrator (together, DuPont), had violated ERISA by paying her.

The federal district court entered summary judgment for the Estate, ordering DuPont to pay the benefits to the Estate. The Fifth Circuit Court of Appeals reversed, holding that Liv's waiver was an assignment or alienation of her interest to the Estate barred by ERISA.

== Opinion of the court ==
The Supreme Court issued an opinion on January 26, 2009.
