= List of United States Supreme Court cases, volume 556 =

This is a list of all the United States Supreme Court cases from volume 556 of the United States Reports:

Case name	Citation	Date decided
Bartlett v. Strickland	556 U.S. 1	March 9, 2009
A minority group must constitute a numerical majority of the voting-age population in an area before section 2 of the Voting Rights Act requires the creation of a legislative district to prevent dilution of that group's votes.
Vaden v. Discover Bank	556 U.S. 49	2009
A federal court may consider a Federal Arbitration Act §4 petition's underlying controversy to determine whether the controversy "arises under" federal law; however, the underlying controversy must satisfy the well-pleaded complaint rule for the federal court to have jurisdiction over the case.
Vermont v. Brillon	556 U.S. 81	2009
Delay caused by appointed counsel attributed to the defense, rather than the government, does not violate the Speedy Trial Clause of the Sixth Amendment.
Kansas v. Colorado	556 U.S. 98	2009
Knowles v. Mirzayance	556 U.S. 111	2009
Habeas relief may only be granted if the state court decision unreasonably applied the ineffective-assistance-of-counsel standard established by Strickland v. Washington. Moreover, no federal court has clearly endorsed applying a looser standard where the defense attorney ought to have done something because the defendant had "nothing to lose" was sufficient to find ineffective assistance.
Puckett v. United States	556 U.S. 129	2009
Federal Rule of Criminal Procedure 52(b)'s plain error test applies to challenges of whether the prosecutor failed to follow through on a plea bargain, so those challenges generally cannot be made for the first time on appeal.
Rivera v. Illinois	556 U.S. 148	2009
Unintentional errors by the court, that would not have altered the proceedings of the case, do not warrant a new trial and do not violate the Sixth Amendment's clause of the right to a fair trial.
Hawaii v. Office of Hawaiian Affairs	556 U.S. 163	2009
The Apology Resolution did not strip Hawaii of its sovereign authority to alienate the lands the United States held in absolute fee and granted to the state upon its admission to the union.
Philip Morris USA v. Williams	556 U.S. 178	2009
Dismissed as improvidently granted.
Harbison v. Bell	556 U.S. 180	2009
Indigent death row inmates sentenced under state law have a right to federally funded habeas counsel in post-conviction state clemency proceedings, when the state has denied such counsel.
Entergy Corp. v. Riverkeeper, Inc.	556 U.S. 208	2009
The EPA permissibly relied on cost-benefit analysis in setting the national performance standards in providing for cost-benefit variances from the standards, as part of the Phase II regulations.
14 Penn Plaza LLC v. Pyett	556 U.S. 247	2009
A provision in a collective-bargaining agreement that clearly and unmistakably requires union members to arbitrate ADEA claims is enforceable as a matter of federal law. This CBA clearly and unmistakably requires respondents to arbitrate the age discrimination claims at issue in this appeal.
United States v. Navajo Nation	556 U.S. 287	2009
The Navajo Nation's breach of fiduciary duty claim against the Federal Government fails because the Federal Government cannot be sued without its consent.
Corley v. United States	556 U.S. 303	2009
18 U. S. C. §3501 modified the McNabb–Mallory doctrine but did not supplant it.
Arizona v. Gant	556 U.S. 332	2009
(1) Belton does not authorize a vehicle search incident to a recent occupant’s arrest after the arrestee has been secured and cannot access the interior of the vehicle. (2) Circumstances unique to the automobile context justify a search incident to arrest when it is reasonable to believe that evidence of the offense of arrest might be found in the vehicle.
Republic of Iran v. Elahi	556 U.S. 366	2009
Shinseki v. Sanders	556 U.S. 396	2009
The Federal Circuit's review of claims decisions made by the Department of Veterans Affairs must use the same harmless-error framework used in other civil cases.
Nken v. Holder	556 U.S. 418	2009
Immigrants who are contesting their impending deportation may request stays using the ordinary standards, but they cannot claim that they will be irreparably injured by wrongful deportation.
Cone v. Bell	556 U.S. 449	2009
FCC v. Fox Tel. Stations	556 U.S. 502	2009
The Federal Communications Commission had not acted arbitrarily when it changed a long-standing policy and implemented a new ban on even "fleeting expletives" from the airwaves. The Court explicitly declined to decide whether the new rule is constitutional, and sent that issue back to the lower courts for their review.
Dean v. United States	556 U.S. 568	2009
The 10-year mandatory minimum applies if a gun is discharged in the course of a violent or drug trafficking crime, whether on purpose or by accident.
Kansas v. Ventris	556 U.S. 586	2009
A statement collected in violation of the Sixth Amendment may be admissible to impeach inconsistent testimony at trial.
Burlington N. & S.F.R.R. Co. v. United States	556 U.S. 599	2009
To be an "arranger" under CERCLA requires the specific intent to dispose toxic waste.
Arthur Andersen LLP v. Carlisle	556 U.S. 624	2009
The FAA does not alter state contract law regarding the scope of agreements, including arbitration agreements.
Carlsbad Technology, Inc. v. HIF Bio, Inc.	556 U.S. 635	2009
A district court's order remanding a case to state court after declining to exercise supplemental jurisdiction over state-law claims is not a remand for lack of subject-matter jurisdiction. Therefore, the denial may be appealed within the federal system.
Flores-Figueroa v. United States	556 U.S. 646	2009
The "knowingly" requirement for the federal crime of aggravated identity theft requires that the defendant knew that the false identification he used actually belonged to another person.
Ashcroft v. Iqbal	556 U.S. 662	2009
(1) Top government officials are not liable for the actions of their subordinates absent evidence that they ordered the allegedly discriminatory activity. (2) The heightened fact pleading standards, as required by Bell Atlantic Corp. v. Twombly, apply to all federal court cases
AT&T v. Hulteen	556 U.S. 701	2009
Maternity leave taken before the passage of the 1978 Pregnancy Discrimination Act cannot be considered in calculating employee pension benefits.
Haywood v. Drown	556 U.S. 729	2009
A state law barring state courts from hearing damages actions against corrections officers violates the Supremacy Clause by not permitting adjudication of claims under 42 USC 1983.
Montejo v. Louisiana	556 U.S. 778	2009
A defendant may validly waive his right to counsel for police interrogation, even if police initiate the interrogation after the defendant's 6th Amendment right to counsel had attached at an arraignment or similar proceeding. Michigan v. Jackson is overruled.
Abuelhawa v. United States	556 U.S. 816	2009
The use of a cell phone to purchase a misdemeanor amount of drugs does not rise to the level of it being a "communication facility" for the purposes of felony drug distribution.
Bobby v. Bies	556 U.S. 825	2009
The Double Jeopardy Clause does not bar a courts from conducting a full hearing on a convicted defendant's mental capacity to determine if they are eligible for the death penalty.
CSX Transp., Inc. v. Hensley	556 U.S. 838	2009
Republic of Iraq v. Beaty	556 U.S. 848	2009
The EWSAA gave the president the authority to restore the sovereign immunity of Iraq. Accordingly, Americans do not have a right to sue the Iraqi government for torture and other abuse committed under Saddam Hussein.
Caperton v. A.T. Massey Coal Co.	556 U.S. 868	2009
The Due Process Clause of the Fourteenth Amendment requires judges to recuse themselves not only when actual bias has been demonstrated or when the judge has an economic interest in the outcome of the case but also when "extreme facts" create a "probability of bias."
United States v. Denedo	556 U.S. 904	2009
The military appellate courts have jurisdiction to hear a request for a writ of coram nobis.
United States ex rel. Eisenstein v. City of New York	556 U.S. 928	2009
Where the Government has not intervened or actively participated, private plaintiffs under the False Claims Act must file an appeal within 30 days of the judgment or order being appealed, according to the Federal Rules of Appellate Procedure.
Boyle v. United States	556 U.S. 938	2009
Proof of a pattern of racketeering activity may be sufficient in a particular case to permit a jury to infer the existence of an association-in-fact enterprise.
Indiana State Police Pension Trust v. Chrysler LLC	556 U.S. 960	June 9, 2009
Denying a stay related to the Chrysler Chapter 11 reorganization, explaining that "A denial of a stay is not a decision on the merits of the underlying legal issues."
