= Ysursa v. Pocatello Education Association =

- Supreme Court of the United States

Decided February 24, 2009
- Full case name: Ysursa v. Pocatello Education Association
- Citations: 555 U.S. 353 (more)

Holding
- A state ban on political payroll deductions for contributions by public employees to their union's political action committee does not infringe the unions' First Amendment rights.

Court membership
- Chief Justice John Roberts Associate Justices John P. Stevens · Antonin Scalia; Anthony Kennedy · David Souter; Clarence Thomas · Ruth Bader Ginsburg; Stephen Breyer · Samuel Alito

Case opinions
- Majority: Roberts
- Concurrence: Ginsburg (in part)
- Concur/dissent: Breyer
- Dissent: Stevens
- Dissent: Souter

Ysursa v. Pocatello Education Association, 555 U.S. 353 (2009), was a United States Supreme Court case in which the court held that a state ban on political payroll deductions for contributions by public employees to their union's political action committee does not infringe the unions' First Amendment rights.

== Background ==
Idaho's Right to Work Act permits public employees to authorize payroll deductions for general union dues, but it prohibits such deductions for union political activities. A group of Idaho public employee unions including the Pocatello Education Association sued, alleging that the ban on payroll deductions for political activities violated the First and Fourteenth Amendments. The federal District Court upheld the ban at the state level, but it struck it down as it applies to local governments. In affirming, the Ninth Circuit Court of Appeals stated that, while Idaho has the ultimate control over local governmental units, it did not actually operate or control their payroll deduction systems. The court applied strict scrutiny to hold that the statute was unconstitutional as applied at the local level.

== Opinion of the court ==
The Supreme Court issued an opinion on February 24, 2009.
