= United States v. Eurodif S.A. =

- Supreme Court of the United States

Decided January 26, 2009
- Full case name: United States v. Eurodif S.A.
- Citations: 555 U.S. 305 (more)

Holding
- When a statute delegates an interpretive decision to an administrative agency in the first instance, the agency's interpretation governs in the absence of unambiguous statutory language to the contrary or an unreasonable resolution of ambiguous language.

Court membership
- Chief Justice John Roberts Associate Justices John P. Stevens · Antonin Scalia; Anthony Kennedy · David Souter; Clarence Thomas · Ruth Bader Ginsburg; Stephen Breyer · Samuel Alito

Case opinion
- Majority: Souter, joined by unanimous

United States v. Eurodif S.A., 555 U.S. 305 (2009), was a United States Supreme Court case in which the court held that when a statute delegates an interpretive decision to an administrative agency in the first instance, the agency's interpretation governs in the absence of unambiguous statutory language to the contrary or an unreasonable resolution of ambiguous language. Here, the Commerce Department's interpretation of the contract at issue as a sales of goods rather than of services reflected a permissible interpretation and application of its authorizing statute.

== Background ==
Nuclear utilities generally procure their fuel, "low enriched uranium" (LEU), through one of two types of contracts. Under an "enriched uranium product" (EUP) contract, the utility simply pays the enricher cash for LEU of a desired quantity and "assay," i.e., its percentage of the isotope necessary for a nuclear reaction. The amount of energy required to enrich a quantity of "feed uranium" to a given assay is described in terms of an industry standard called a "separative work unit" (SWU). Under a "SWU contract," the utility provides a quantity of feed uranium and pays the enricher for the SWUs to produce the required LEU quantity and assay. SWU contracts do not require that the required number of SWUs actually be applied to the utility's uranium. Because feed uranium is fungible and essentially trades like a commodity, and because profitable operation of an enrichment plant requires the constant processing of feed uranium from the enricher's undifferentiated stock, the LEU provided to a utility under a SWU contract cannot be traced to the particular unenriched uranium the utility provided.

Petitioners (collectively, USEC), who ran the only uranium enrichment factory in the United States, petitioned the Commerce Department for relief under the Tariff Act of 1930, which calls for "antidumping" duties on "foreign merchandise" sold in this country at "less than its fair value" but does not touch international sales of services. USEC alleged that LEU imported from European countries under both EUP and SWU contracts was being sold in the United States at less than fair value and was materially harming domestic industry.

In its final determination, the Commerce Department concluded that LEU from France, including LEU acquired under SWU contracts, was being sold here at less than fair value. Among other things, the Commerce Department rejected the claim that such transactions were sales of enrichment services, as provided in SWU contracts. The Court of International Trade (CIT) ultimately reversed, noting the "legal fiction" expressed in SWU contracts that the very feed uranium delivered by a utility to an enricher is enriched and then returned as LEU to the utility. Finding that the record did not support a determination that the enricher has any ownership rights, the CIT reasoned that the Commerce Department's decision was unsupported by substantial evidence and not in accordance with law. The Federal Circuit affirmed, approaching the issues much as the CIT had.

== Opinion of the court ==
The Supreme Court issued an opinion on January 26, 2009.
