= List of United States Supreme Court cases, volume 555 =

This is a list of all the United States Supreme Court cases from volume 555 of the United States Reports:

Case name	Citation	Date decided
Moore v. United States	555 U.S. 1	2008
Under United States v. Booker and Kimbrough v. United States, the Sentencing Guidelines suggesting a disparity between crack and powder cocaine are advisory only.
Brunner v. Ohio Republican Party	555 U.S. 5	2008
It is not clear that the Help America Vote Act gives district courts the authority to enforce Section 303 in an action brought by a private litigant.
Winter v. Nat. Resources Defense Council	555 U.S. 7	2008
Military preparedness outweighs environmental concerns, as Navy needs to train its crews to detect modern, silent submarines, and it cannot be forced to turn off its sonar when whales are spotted nearby.
Bell v. Kelly	555 U.S. 55	2008
Dismissed as improvidently granted.
Hedgpeth v. Pulido	555 U.S. 57	2008
A conviction based on a general verdict is subject to challenge if the jury was instructed on alternative theories of guilt and may have relied on an invalid one.
Altria Group, Inc. v. Good	555 U.S. 70	2008
Federal law does not preempt the application of state law prohibiting deceptive practices in advertising to the advertisement of tar and nicotine rates in cigarettes.
Jimenez v. Quarterman	555 U.S. 113	January 13, 2009
A state conviction is not "final" for the purpose of filing a federal habeas petition when a state court grants an out-of-time appeal.
Chambers v. United States	555 U.S. 122	2009
Failing to report for incarceration does not qualify as a "violent felony" for the purposes of the Armed Career Criminal Act.
Herring v. United States	555 U.S. 135	2009
Evidence obtained after illegal searches or arrests based on simple police mistakes that are not the result of repeated patterns or flagrant misconduct cannot have the exclusionary rule used to suppress evidence.
Oregon v. Ice	555 U.S. 160	2009
The Sixth Amendment does not inhibit states from assigning to judges, rather than juries, the finding of facts necessary to the imposition of consecutive, rather than concurrent, sentences for multiple offenses.
Waddington v. Sarausad	555 U.S. 179	2009
Sarausad was tried with due process by the State of Washington and he should not have been granted habeas corpus relief. In doing so, the federal government overstepped its bounds.
Locke v. Karass	555 U.S. 207	2009
The local unit of a union may assess non-members a service fee to cover national litigation if that litigation involves collective bargaining or other issues which could conceivably involve the local unit and if the payment by the local unit is reciprocal.
Pearson v. Callahan	555 U.S. 223	2009
Saucier v. Katz's two-step process is no longer mandatory. Courts using that test may analyze the two steps in whatever order is most appropriate in a particular case.
Fitzgerald v. Barnstable Sch. Comm.	555 U.S. 246	2009
Title IX does not preclude a §1983 action alleging unconstitutional gender discrimination in schools.
Spears v. United States	555 U.S. 261	2009
Crawford v. City of Nashville	555 U.S. 271	2009
The anti-retaliation provision of section 704(a) of Title VII of the 1964 Civil Rights Act protects employees who merely cooperate with an internal probe rather than complain on their own or take part in a formal investigation.
Kennedy v. Plan Admin.	555 U.S. 285	2009
Because a divorcee did not attempt to direct her interest in the SIP benefits to the Estate or any other potential beneficiary, her waiver did not constitute an assignment or alienation rendered void under ERISA.
United States v. Eurodif S.A.	555 U.S. 305	2009
When a statute delegates an interpretive decision to an administrative agency in the first instance, the agency's interpretation governs in the absence of unambiguous statutory language to the contrary or an unreasonable resolution of ambiguous language.
Arizona v. Johnson	555 U.S. 323	2009
Police may conduct a patdown search of a passenger in a stopped automobile if they reasonably suspect that the passenger is armed and dangerous.
Van de Kamp v. Goldstein	555 U.S. 335	2009
Prosecutors are absolutely immune from suit under 42 U.S.C. § 1983 for their claims based on management tasks such as their supervision or training of subordinates and their information-system organization.
Nelson v. United States	555 U.S. 350	2009
Prior Supreme Court case law does not allow a sentencing court to presume that a sentence within the applicable Guidelines range is reasonable.
Ysursa v. Pocatello Educ. Ass'n	555 U.S. 353	2009
A state ban on political payroll deductions for contributions by public employees to their union's political action committee does not infringe the unions' First Amendment rights.
Carcieri v. Salazar	555 U.S. 379	2009
The term "now under Federal jurisdiction" referred only to tribes that were federally recognized when the Indian Reorganization Act became law and the federal government could not take land into trust from tribes that were recognized after 1934.
United States v. Hayes	555 U.S. 415	2009
A conviction for a state crime of "domestic violence" obtains when the defendant is convicted of a crime based on actions which in fact constitute domestic violence; a state statute specifically proscribing domestic violence is not required.
Pac. Bell Tel. Co. v. linkLine Communications, Inc.	555 U.S. 438	2009
A "price squeezing" claim cannot be brought under Section 2 of the Sherman Act when the defendant is under no duty to sell inputs to the plaintiff in the first place.
City of Pleasant Grove v. Summum	555 U.S. 460	2009
A municipality's acceptance and acquisition of a privately funded permanent monument erected in a public park while refusing to accept other privately funded permanent memorials is a valid expression of governmental speech.
Summers v. Earth Island Inst.	555 U.S. 488	2009
Petitioner environmental organizations' claim that it is statistically likely that some of their members will visit the affected lands is insufficient to support Article III standing.
Negusie v. Holder	555 U.S. 511	2009
The Board of Immigration Appeals and the Fifth Circuit misapplied Fedorenko as mandating that whether an alien is compelled to assist in persecution is immaterial for persecutor-bar purposes.
Wyeth v. Levine	555 U.S. 555	2009
Federal law does not preempt Levine's claim that Phenergan's label did not contain an adequate warning about the IV-push method of administration. Supreme Court of Vermont affirmed.
Forest Grove Sch. Dist. v. T. A	555 U.S. 1130	2009
IDEA authorizes reimbursement for private special-education services when a public school fails to provide a FAPE and the private-school placement is appropriate, regardless of whether the child previously received special-education services through the public school.
Cuomo v. Clearing House Ass'n, L.L.C.	555 U.S. 1130	2009
12 U.S.C. § 484 and 12 CFR § 7.4000 do not prohibit measures taken by the New York State Attorney General to enforce state fair lending law against national banks. The Court held that "visitorial powers" accorded to the OCC do not preempt state laws regulating banks.
