= Knowles v. Mirzayance =

- Supreme Court of the United States

Decided March 24, 2009
- Full case name: Knowles v. Mirzayance
- Citations: 556 U.S. 111 (more)

Holding
- Habeas relief may only be granted if the state court decision unreasonably applied the ineffective-assistance-of-counsel standard established by Strickland. Moreover, no federal court has clearly endorsed applying a looser standard where the defense attorney ought to have done something because the defendant had "nothing to lose" was sufficient to find ineffective assistance.

Court membership
- Chief Justice John Roberts Associate Justices John P. Stevens · Antonin Scalia; Anthony Kennedy · David Souter; Clarence Thomas · Ruth Bader Ginsburg; Stephen Breyer · Samuel Alito

Case opinion
- Majority: Thomas, joined by unanimous

Knowles v. Mirzayance, 556 U.S. 111 (2009), was a United States Supreme Court case in which the court held that habeas relief may only be granted if the state court decision unreasonably applied the ineffective-assistance-of-counsel standard established by Strickland v. Washington. Moreover, no federal court has clearly endorsed applying a looser standard where the defense attorney ought to have done something because the defendant had "nothing to lose" was sufficient to find ineffective assistance.

== Background ==
Mirzayance entered pleas of not guilty and not guilty by reason of insanity (NGI) at his state-court murder trial. During the guilt phase, he sought to avoid a conviction for first-degree murder and instead obtain a second-degree murder verdict by presenting medical testimony that he was insane at the time of the crime and was, therefore, incapable of the necessary premeditation or deliberation. The jury nevertheless convicted him of first-degree murder. After the trial's NGI phase was scheduled, Mirzayance accepted his counsel's recommendation to abandon the insanity plea. Counsel believed that a defense verdict was unlikely because the jury had just rejected medical testimony similar to that which would be presented to establish the NGI defense. Moreover, although counsel had planned to supplement the medical evidence with testimony by Mirzayance's parents as to their son's mental illness, the parents refused to testify at the last moment. Following his conviction, Mirzayance alleged in state postconviction proceedings that his attorney's recommendation to withdraw the NGI plea constituted ineffective assistance of counsel under Strickland v. Washington. The trial court denied relief, and the California Court of Appeal affirmed.

Mirzayance then applied for federal habeas relief, which the federal District Court denied. The Ninth Circuit Court of Appeals reversed, ordering an evidentiary hearing on counsel's recommendation to withdraw the NGI plea. During the hearing, the Magistrate Judge made extensive fact-findings, including, among other things, that the NGI-phase medical evidence essentially would have duplicated the evidence the jury rejected in the guilt phase; that counsel doubted the likelihood of prevailing on the NGI claim because the jury's finding of first-degree murder as a practical matter would cripple Mirzayance's chances of convincing the jury that he nevertheless was incapable of understanding the nature and quality of his act and of distinguishing right from wrong; that Mirzayance's parents were not simply reluctant but had effectively refused to testify; that counsel had made a carefully reasoned decision not to proceed with the NGI plea after weighing his options and discussing the matter with experienced co-counsel; but that counsel's performance was nevertheless deficient because Mirzayance had "nothing to lose" by going forward with the NGI phase of the trial. The Magistrate Judge also found prejudice and recommended habeas relief.

The District Court accepted the recommendation and granted the writ. The Court of Appeals affirmed, ruling, among other things, that counsel's performance had been deficient because Mirzayance's parents had not refused, but had merely expressed reluctance to testify, and because competent counsel would have attempted to persuade them to testify, which Mirzayance's counsel admittedly did not. The court essentially concluded that competent counsel would have pursued the insanity defense because counsel had nothing to lose by putting on the only defense available. In addition, the court found prejudice because, in the court's view, there was a reasonable probability the jury would have found Mirzayance insane had counsel pursued the NGI phase. The Ninth Circuit concluded that federal habeas relief was authorized under 28 U. S. C. §2254(d)(1) because the California Court of Appeal had "unreasonabl[y] appli[ed] clearly established Federal law."

== Opinion of the court ==
The Supreme Court issued a majority opinion by Clarence Thomas on March 24, 2009. The Court ruled unanimously for Michael A. Knowles, Warden.
