= Vermont v. Brillon =

- Supreme Court of the United States

Argued January 13, 2009 Decided March 9, 2009
- Full case name: Vermont v. Michael Brillon
- Docket no.: 08-88
- Citations: 556 U.S. 81 (more) 129 S. Ct. 1283

Holding
- Delay caused by appointed counsel attributed to the defense, rather than the government, does not violate the Speedy Trial Clause of the Sixth Amendment.

Court membership
- Chief Justice John Roberts Associate Justices John P. Stevens · Antonin Scalia; Anthony Kennedy · David Souter; Clarence Thomas · Ruth Bader Ginsburg; Stephen Breyer · Samuel Alito

Case opinions
- Majority: Ginsburg, joined by Roberts, Scalia, Kennedy, Souter, Thomas, and Alito
- Dissent: Breyer, joined by Stevens

Laws applied
- U.S. Constitution Amend. VI

Vermont v. Brillon, 556 U.S. 81 (2009), decision of the Supreme Court of the United States in which the Court held that trial delay caused by a criminal defendant's public defender should be attributed to the defense, rather than the government, does not violate the Speedy Trial Clause of the Sixth Amendment.

== See also ==
- Barker v. Wingo (1972)
