= Boyle v. United States =

- Supreme Court of the United States

Argued January 14, 2009 Decided June 8, 2009
- Full case name: Boyle v. United States
- Docket no.: 07-1309
- Citations: 556 U.S. 938 (more) 129 S. Ct. 2237; 173 L. Ed. 2d 1265

Case history
- Prior: United States v. Boyle, 283 F. App'x 825 (2d Cir. 2007)

Holding
- Proof of a pattern of racketeering activity may be sufficient in a particular case to permit a jury to infer the existence of an association-in-fact enterprise.

Court membership
- Chief Justice John Roberts Associate Justices John P. Stevens · Antonin Scalia; Anthony Kennedy · David Souter; Clarence Thomas · Ruth Bader Ginsburg; Stephen Breyer · Samuel Alito

Case opinions
- Majority: Alito, joined by Roberts, Scalia, Kennedy, Souter, Thomas, Ginsburg
- Dissent: Stevens, joined by Breyer

Laws applied
- Racketeer Influenced and Corrupt Organizations Act

Boyle v. United States, 556 U.S. 938 (2009), is a decision by the United States Supreme Court involving what constitutes an "enterprise" under the Racketeer Influenced and Corrupt Organizations Act (RICO). The Court, in a 7-2 opinion, held that any group convened to carry out a crime meets the definition of an enterprise, even if it was only created for that purpose.

== Background ==
In the 1990s, Edmund Boyle was a member of a crew of bank robbers who were alleged to have ties to New York's Gambino crime family. The group, known as the "Night Drop Crew", exploited poorly secured night deposit boxes and are believed to have conducted more than thirty robberies. One news report estimated that Boyle and his crew eventually stole more than $1 million. Targeting banks mostly in the New York City area, each member of the crew had assigned tasks; Boyle's job was to steal the getaway car. In 2003, Boyle and his associates were indicted for the 1994 robbery of a branch of the National Westminster Bank in Brooklyn.

== Procedural history ==
Boyle was charged with participation in the conduct of the affairs of an enterprise through a pattern of racketeering activity, conspiracy to commit that offense, conspiracy to commit bank burglary, and nine counts of bank burglary and attempted bank burglary. After a 2005 trial before Judge Sterling Johnson, Jr. of the United States District Court for the Eastern District of New York, a jury found Boyle guilty of eleven of the twelve counts. He was sentenced to 151 months' imprisonment.

Boyle appealed the conviction on the racketeering charge, arguing that Judge Johnson improperly instructed the jury on the definition of an "enterprise" as defined in the Racketeer Influenced and Corrupt Organizations Act (RICO). The United States Court of Appeals for the Second Circuit denied the appeal in 2007. Boyle appealed to the Supreme Court, which granted certiorari the following year.

== Discussion ==
=== Issue ===
Must an association-in-fact enterprise have an ascertainable structure beyond that inherent in the pattern of racketeering activity in which it engages?

=== Arguments ===
The RICO Act makes it illegal to be a part of an enterprise engaged in racketeering, but does not completely define the term "enterprise". In a 1981 case, United States v. Turkette, the Court held that "an enterprise includes any union or group of individuals associated in fact". Boyle's attorneys argued that to be considered an enterprise, a group needed some form of clear organization or hierarchy, which they claimed the Night Drop Crew lacked.

=== Opinion of the Court ===
In a 7–2 decision, Justice Samuel Alito, writing for the majority, held that the jury instructions were correct, and that "proof of a pattern of racketeering activity may be sufficient in a particular case to permit a jury to infer the existence of an association-in-fact enterprise." Specifically, they held that the structural components the petitioner proposed were not required by the statute. "We see no basis in the language of RICO for the structural requirements that petitioner asks us to recognize. As we said in Turkette, an association-in-fact enterprise is simply a continuing unit that functions with a common purpose." Because they found the language of the statute to be unambiguous, the Court did not consider arguments about the legislative history.

=== Stevens's dissent ===
Justice John Paul Stevens, joined by Justice Stephen Breyer, dissented. Stevens wrote that, based on prior statutes and on the ordinary usage of the word, Congress intended "enterprise" to be more than a group of people. The term meant, Stevens believed, "to refer only to business-like entities that have an existence apart from the predicate acts committed by their employees or associates." The Court's interpretation, he wrote, "will allow juries to infer the existence of an enterprise in every case involving a pattern of racketeering activity undertaken by two or more associates."

== Aftermath ==
A year after the Supreme Court rejected his appeals, Boyle was convicted in an unrelated charge of murder, stemming from a 1998 mob killing in Staten Island. The conviction added twenty years to his jail sentence.

== See also ==
- List of United States Supreme Court cases, volume 556
