= 2008 term per curiam opinions of the Supreme Court of the United States =

The Supreme Court of the United States handed down nine per curiam opinions during its 2008 term, which began on October 6, 2008 and concluded October 4, 2009.

Because per curiam decisions are issued from the Court as an institution, these opinions all lack the attribution of authorship or joining votes to specific justices. All justices on the Court at the time the decision was handed down are assumed to have participated and concurred unless otherwise noted.

== Court membership ==
Chief Justice: John Roberts

Associate Justices: John Paul Stevens, Antonin Scalia, Anthony Kennedy, David Souter, Clarence Thomas, Ruth Bader Ginsburg, Stephen Breyer, Samuel Alito

== Moore v. United States ==
- Full caption: James Eric Moore v. United States
- Citations: 555 U.S. 1
- Prior history: Defendant convicted, sentenced, N.D. Ia.; aff'd, 470 F. 3d 767 (8th Cir. 2006); vacated and remanded, 552 U.S. 1090 (2008); aff'd, 518 F. 3d 577 (2008)
- Laws applied: 18 U.S.C. § 3553
- Full text of the opinion: official slip opinion · Findlaw · Justia

555 U.S. 1
Decided October 14, 2008.
Under United States v. Booker and Kimbrough v. United States, the Sentencing Guidelines suggesting a disparity between crack and powder cocaine are advisory only.

Eighth Circuit reversed and remanded.

== Brunner v. Ohio Republican Party ==
- Full caption: Jennifer Brunner, Ohio Secretary of State v. Ohio Republican Party, et al.
- Citations: 555 U.S. 5
- Prior history: TRO granted, S.D. Ohio, Oct. 9, 2008; motion to vacate denied, 6th Cir. (en banc)
- Laws applied: 42 U.S.C. § 15483(a)(5)(B)(i) (Help America Vote Act of 2002 §303)
- Full text of the opinion: official slip opinion · Findlaw · Justia

555 U.S. 5
Decided October 14, 2008.
In 2002, President George W. Bush signed the Help America Vote Act (HAVA) into law. One provision of HAVA required the officials who maintain each state's voter registration database to work with the officials who maintain each state's driver's license database to help verify the accuracy of each list. The Ohio Republican Party, which believed that then-Secretary of State Jennifer Brunner was not complying with the law by not working with Ohio Department of Transportation officials, sued to force her compliance.

The District Court entered a Temporary Restraining Order (TRO) ordering Brunner to begin compliance immediately. Brunner appealed to the Sixth Circuit, which declined to vacate the TRO, thus continuing to force her compliance. Brunner once again appealed to the Supreme Court, which granted her application to vacate the TRO, and in a per curiam opinion held that while they express no opinion regarding whether Brunner was properly implementing HAVA, it was not sufficiently likely that HAVA gave district courts the authority to enforce Section 303 in an action brought by a private litigant to justify a TRO.

== Hedgpeth v. Pulido ==
- Full caption: Anthony Hedgpeth, Warden, v. Michael Robert Pulido
- Citations: 555 U.S. 57
- Prior history: Defendant's conviction upheld, sub. nom., People v. Pulido, 936 P.2d 1235 (Cal. 1997); petition granted, sub nom., Pulido v. Lamarque, No. 99–4933, (N.D. Cal. Mar. 24, 2005); aff'd, sub nom., Pulido v. Chrones, 487 F.3d 669 (9th Cir. 2007), cert. granted, 552 U.S. 1230 (2008)
- Laws applied: U.S. Const. amend. XIV
- Full text of the opinion: official slip opinion · Findlaw · Justia

555 U.S. 57
Decided December 2, 2008.
Ninth Circuit vacated and remanded.

A conviction based on a general verdict is subject to challenge if the jury was instructed on alternative theories of guilt and may have relied on an invalid one. When this happens, it is not structural error, so it is subject to constitutional harmless error analysis. As explained in Brecht v. Abrahamson, 507 U. S. 619, 623 (1993), the reviewing court must ask if the flaw in the instructions had substantial and injurious effect or influence in determining the jury's verdict. If so, the verdict must be overturned.

Stevens filed a dissent, joined by Souter and Ginsburg.

== Spears v. United States ==
- Full caption: Steven Spears v. United States
- Citations: 555 U.S. 261
- Prior history: Defendant convicted, sentenced; sentencing reversed, remanded, 469 F.3d 1166 (8th Circuit 2006); vacated, remanded, 552 U.S. 1090 (2008); reversed, remanded, 533 F.3d 715 (8th Cir. 2008)
- Laws applied: 18 U.S.C. § 3553
- Full text of the opinion: official slip opinion · Findlaw · Justia

555 U.S. 261
Decided January 21, 2009.
Federal district courts may categorically reject the disparity between the crack and powder cocaine sentencing guidelines on policy grounds. The court cited Kimbrough v. United States. Eighth Circuit reversed and remanded.

Kennedy noted without separate opinion that he would grant the petition for a writ of certiorari and set the case for oral argument. Thomas dissented without separate opinion. Roberts filed a dissent, joined by Alito.

== Nelson v. United States ==
- Full caption: Lawrence W. Nelson, aka Zikee v. United States
- Citations: 555 U.S. 350
- Prior history: Conviction and sentencing affirmed, 237 Fed. Appx. 819 (4th Cir. 2007); vacated, remanded, 552 U.S. 1163 (2008); sentence affirmed, 276 Fed. Appx. 331 (4th Cir. 2008)
- Laws applied: 18 U.S.C. § 3553
- Full text of the opinion: official slip opinion · Findlaw · Justia

555 U.S. 350
Decided January 26, 2009.
Fourth Circuit reversed and remanded.

Prior Supreme Court case law does not allow a sentencing court to presume that a sentence within the applicable Guidelines range is reasonable.

Breyer filed an opinion concurring in the judgment, joined by Alito.

== CSX Transp., Inc. v. Hensley ==
- Full caption: CSX Transportation, Inc. v. Thurston Hensley
- Citations: 556 U.S. 838
- Prior history: Judgment for plaintiff; aff'd, 278 S.W. 3d 282 (Tenn. 2008)
- Laws applied: 45 U.S.C. § 51 et seq. (Federal Employers' Liability Act)
- Full text of the opinion: official slip opinion · Findlaw · Justia

556 U.S. 838
Decided June 1, 2009.
Court of Appeals of Tennessee, Eastern Division, reversed and remanded.

Stevens and Ginsburg filed dissents.

== Indiana State Police Pension Trust v. Chrysler LLC ==
- Full caption: Indiana State Police Pension Trust, et al. v. Chrysler LLC, et al.
- Citations: 556 U.S. 960
- Prior history: Restructuring plan approved, Bankr. S.D.N.Y., May 31, 2009; aff'd, 2d Cir., June 5, 2009; temporary stay granted, June 8, 2009 (Ginsburg, J.)
- Full text of the opinion: official slip opinion

556 U.S. 960
Decided June 9, 2009.
Application for stay denied.

== See also ==
- List of United States Supreme Court cases, volume 555
- List of United States Supreme Court cases, volume 556
