= Henry Ford Jackson Hospital =

- Henry Ford Health System
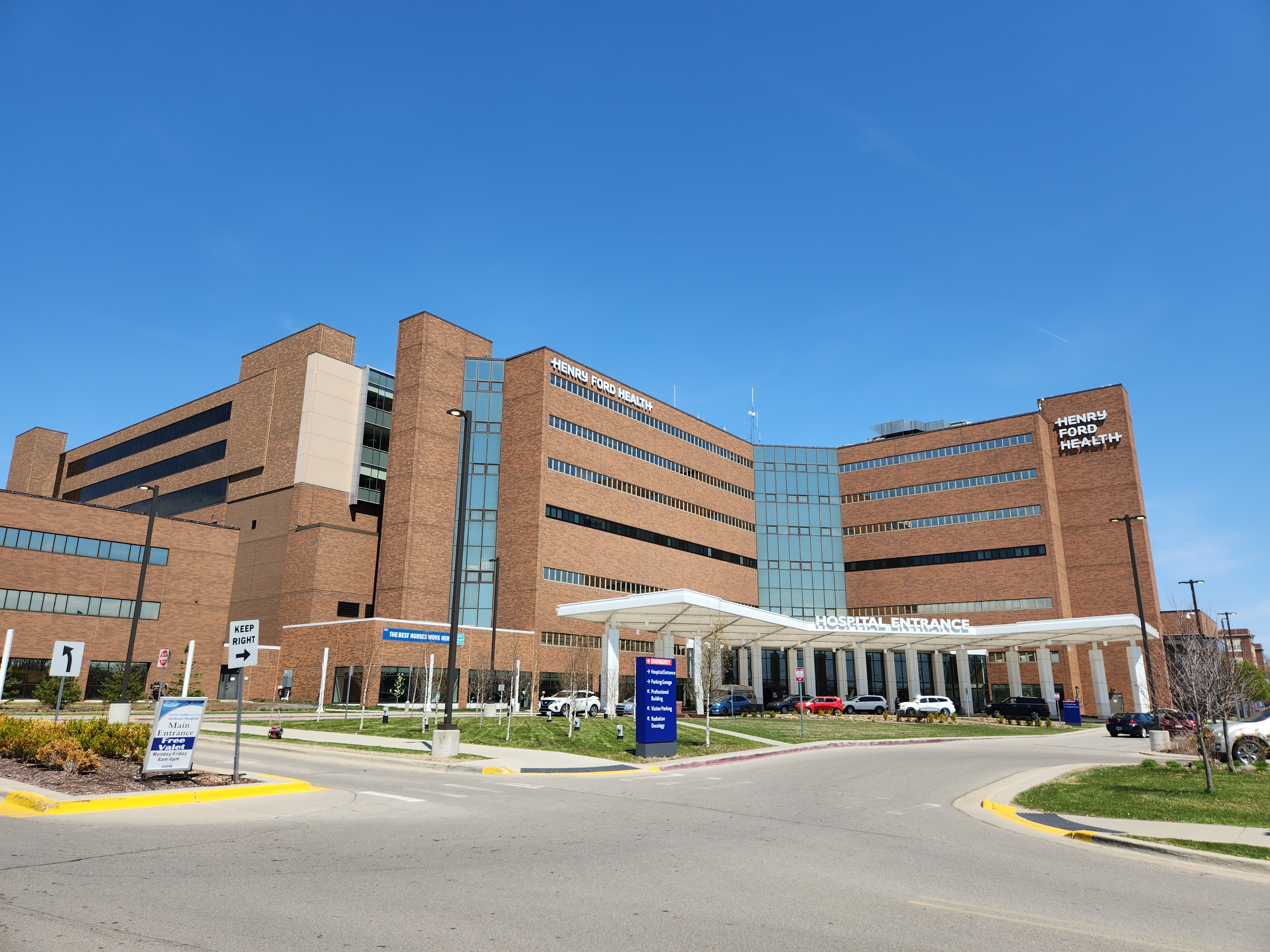
- Main entrance of the hospital

Geography
- Location: 205 N. East Ave, Jackson, Jackson County, Michigan, United States
- Coordinates: 42.2505°N 84.3942°W

Organization
- Care system: Henry Ford Health

Services
- Emergency department: Level II trauma center
- Beds: 475

History
- Founded: 1918

Links
- Website: henryford.com/locations/jackson-hospital
- Lists: Hospitals in Michigan

Henry Ford Jackson Hospital is a 475-bed health system in Jackson in the U.S. state of Michigan.

Henry Ford Jackson Hospital has more than 400 physicians and 3,700 staff members. The health system offers specialized services including a new cancer center and a heart center with a 20-bed cardiac universal bed unit. A new specialty center combines services for patients with brain, spine, neck, joint and bone conditions. The specialty center also includes a new osteoporosis center, balance center and pain management center as well. Other health system features include an emergency department designated as a level II trauma center, urgent care centers, and a pediatric and birthing care.

Henry Ford Jackson Hospital operates the Henry Ford Specialty Hospital (formerly CareLink of Jackson) to provide long-term acute care. The Health System also provides care at family medical centers in Albion, Brooklyn, Grass Lake, Jackson, Leslie, Mason, Onsted and Spring Arbor. Henry Ford Allegiance Radiation Oncology offers cancer care.

== History ==
Henry Ford Jackson Hospital was founded in 1918 as W.A. Foote Memorial Hospital when a local citizen, Ida Foote, donated land for the construction of a new hospital in honor of her late husband, W.A. Foote.

Mercy Hospital opened in 1918. Sister Hynes was one of its founders, serving as its first mother superior. She belonged to the Sisters of Mercy, a Catholic order of nuns dedicated to the sick and needy. In its heyday, the hospital held 213 beds and 40 bassinets.

In 1975, it was purchased by Foote Hospital for $2.5 million, and changed its name to Foote West. Foote West closed in 1984 after a new hospital was built on E. Michigan Avenue. The Lansing Avenue building was demolished in 1989, and a memorial was erected in 1997. The property was given to Jackson County in 1998. It is the current site of the Jackson County Medical Care Facility that opened November 2002.

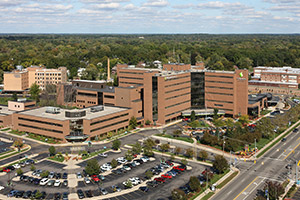
Aerial view of the hospital, 2008

Jackson Osteopathic Hospital served Jackson and its surrounding communities as a short-term acute care hospital From June 1943 to 1988. With the addition of MDs to the staff; Jackson Osteopathic Hospital became Doctors Hospital in 1988. In the late 1990s, the hospital became part of Borgess and remained a short-term acute care hospital until 2003. It was then converted into a long-term acute care hospital (LTACH) called CareLink of Jackson as a joint venture of Borgess and Foote Health System. In 2010, Allegiance Health (Formally Foote Health System) purchased Burgess's share to become the sole owner.

The current hospital facility was completed in 1983 and is located near the site of the original hospital. The former hospital, now named the Charles Anderson Building, is used for specialized practices such as sleep disorders, behavioral health, and volunteer services.

In July 2008, Foote Health System was renamed Allegiance Health. The system was later renamed Henry Ford Allegiance Health on April 5, 2016.

== Acquisition ==
In December 2013, Allegiance Health and the University of Michigan Health System announced that they had signed a letter of intent for Allegiance to become absorbed by the University of Michigan. It was expected that the arrangement would take 18 months to finalize. By November 2014, Allegiance announced they were not able to come to an agreement and would be looking for other partner organizations.

On November 10, 2015, Allegiance announced an agreement to join the Henry Ford Health System The acquisition completed on April 1, 2016.
