= Arizona v. Johnson =

- Supreme Court of the United States

Argued December 9, 2008 Decided January 26, 2009
- Full case name: Arizona, Petitioner v. Lemon Montrea Johnson
- Docket no.: 07-1122
- Citations: 555 U.S. 323 (more) 129 S. Ct. 781; 172 L. Ed. 2d 694; 2009 U.S. LEXIS 868; 77 U.S.L.W. 4096; 21 Fla. L. Weekly Fed. S 620

Case history
- Prior: Reversed, 217 Ariz. 58, 170 P.3d 667 (App. 2007). Review denied, Arizona Supreme Court, 2007 Ariz. LEXIS 154. Certiorari granted, 554 U.S. ___, 128 S.Ct. 2961, 171 L.Ed. 884 (2008).

Holding
- Police may conduct a Terry-stop patdown of a passenger in a stopped automobile if they reasonably suspect that the passenger is armed and dangerous.

Court membership
- Chief Justice John Roberts Associate Justices John P. Stevens · Antonin Scalia; Anthony Kennedy · David Souter; Clarence Thomas · Ruth Bader Ginsburg; Stephen Breyer · Samuel Alito

Case opinion
- Majority: Ginsburg, joined by unanimous

Laws applied
- U.S. Const. amend. IV

Arizona v. Johnson, 555 U.S. 323 (2009), is a United States Supreme Court case in which the Court held, by unanimous decision, that police may conduct a Terry-stop patdown of a passenger in an automobile that has been lawfully stopped for a minor traffic violation, provided that the police reasonably suspect that the passenger is armed and dangerous.

== Background ==
Tucson, Arizona police officers were patrolling a neighborhood associated with the Crips street gang when they stopped a vehicle because its registration had been suspended. Officers noticed that Lemon Montrea Johnson, the vehicle's backseat passenger, looked back and kept his eyes on the officers as they approached, that he was wearing a blue bandana (consistent with Crips membership) and that he had a police scanner in his pocket. While in the car, Johnson stated that he was from a town that the officer knew to be associated with the Crips gang, and also admitted that had served a prison sentence for burglary and had been out of prison for about a year. The police asked Johnson to exit and step away from the car because they wanted to question him and gather gang intelligence. After he complied, the police patted him down because they believed that he was armed and dangerous, based on their observations and Johnson's statements. The pat-down search revealed a gun, and Johnson was arrested.

The trial court denied Johnson's motion to dismiss. On appeal, the Arizona Court of Appeals reversed, concluding that Johnson's detention had evolved into a consensual encounter because the police investigation into his gang affiliation was unrelated to the traffic stop. The Arizona Supreme Court denied review, and the Supreme Court of the United States granted certiorari.

At issue was the question of whether a police officer may search a vehicle stopped for a minor traffic offense when he has no reason to believe that a passenger is committing, or has committed a crime, but reasonably suspects that the driver is armed and dangerous,

== Opinion of the Court ==
The Court ruled that police may lawfully stop and detain an automobile and its occupants pending an inquiry into a minor traffic violation, and may conduct a pat-down search of an occupant if the police reasonably suspect that the individual is armed and dangerous. During a traffic stop, the police may order occupants to exit the vehicle pending completion of the stop. A police officer may pat down a driver once he exits a vehicle if the officer reasonably believes that the driver is armed and dangerous. Passengers are seized under the Fourth Amendment once the vehicle in which they are traveling, when stopped by the police, comes to a complete stop on the side of the road, and the passengers therefore have standing to challenge the constitutionality of the traffic stop.

The Court disagreed with the state appeals court's characterization of Johnson's encounter with the police as consensual. It quoted the dissenting state appellate court judge, who noted that the pat-down occurred shortly after the car had been stopped, and that Johnson would not reasonably have felt he was free to leave at the time of the pat-down. The Court observed that a seizure occurs when the police stop a car for a traffic violation, and the seizure continues and is usually reasonable until the police inform the car's occupants that they are free to leave. In addition, questioning by the police about a matter unrelated to the traffic stop does not make the stop unlawful, as long as those inquiries do not measurably extend the duration of the stop. Here, the act of the traffic stop signaled to Johnson that he was not free to leave, and nothing prior to the pat-down indicated otherwise. The police were not required to afford Johnson the opportunity to leave without ensuring that he was not armed and dangerous.

The judgment of the Arizona Court of Appeals was reversed, and the case was remanded for further proceedings.

== See also ==
- Michigan v. Long (1983)
