= Hawaii v. Office of Hawaiian Affairs =

- Supreme Court of the United States

Argued February 25, 2009 Decided March 31, 2009
- Full case name: Hawaii, et al., Petitioners v. Office of Hawaiian Affairs, et al.
- Docket no.: 07-1372
- Citations: 556 U.S. 163 (more) 129 S. Ct. 1436; 173 L. Ed. 2d 333
- Opinion announcement: Opinion announcement

Holding
- The Apology Resolution did not strip Hawaii of its sovereign authority to alienate the lands the United States held in absolute fee and granted to the state upon its admission to the union.

Court membership
- Chief Justice John Roberts Associate Justices John P. Stevens · Antonin Scalia; Anthony Kennedy · David Souter; Clarence Thomas · Ruth Bader Ginsburg; Stephen Breyer · Samuel Alito

Case opinion
- Majority: Alito, joined by unanimous

Laws applied
- Newlands Resolution, Hawaii Admission Act, Apology Resolution

Hawaii v. Office of Hawaiian Affairs, 556 U.S. 163 (2009), was a United States Supreme Court case about the former crown lands of the Hawaiian monarchy, and whether the state's right to sell them was restricted by the 1993 Apology Resolution. The Court, in an opinion by Justice Samuel Alito, ruled unanimously that the state had the power to sell the lands free of encumbrances.

== Overview ==
In 1893, a "Committee of Safety," in co-operation with United States minister to Hawaii John L. Stevens, overthrew the Kingdom of Hawaii and established a provisional government. The resulting Republic of Hawaii governed the islands until 1898, when the United States granted their proposal for annexation. Under the Newlands Resolution, the Republic of Hawaii "'cede[d] absolutely and without reserve to the United States of America all rights of sovereignty of whatsoever kind' and further 'cede[d] and transfer[red] to the United States the absolute fee and ownership of all public, Government, or Crown lands ... and all other public property of every kind and description belonging to the Government of the Hawaiian Islands.' The Newlands Resolution further provided that all 'property and rights' in the ceded lands 'are vested in the United States of America.'"

The Hawaiian Organic Act established a territorial government for Hawaii in 1900. In the Organic Act, Congress provided that "The portion of the public domain heretofore known as Crown land is hereby declared to have been, on [1898], and prior thereto, the property of the Hawaiian government, and to be free and clear from any trust of or concerning the same, and from all claim of any nature whatsoever, upon the rents, issues, and profits thereof. It shall be subject to alienation and other uses as may be provided by law." In 1959, Hawaii was admitted as a state by the Hawaii Admission Act. In that Act, Congress transferred title to most of the former Crown lands to the state, including the parcel at issue in this case.

In 1993, the United States Congress adopted the Apology Resolution, in which the United States apologized for its role in the overthrow of the Kingdom of Hawaii in 1893. Shortly thereafter, the Office of Hawaiian Affairs (OHA) sought to enjoin a residential development on a parcel of land owned by the state that was held in trust for Native Hawaiians and the general public. OHA also requested that the Housing Finance and Development Corporation (HFDC - the state agency in charge of the parcel's development) certify that any transfer of the parcel's ownership would not diminish Native Hawaiians' claims to the land and include a disclaimer to that effect. The HFDC refused, believing that such a disclaimer would render it impossible for future owners to obtain title insurance. HFDC sent OHA a check for the land. OHA refused to accept the payment.

== Procedural history ==
OHA filed suit in state court. The trial court held in favor of HFDC. On appeal, the Supreme Court of Hawaii reversed and held that the Apology Resolution changed the legal relationships of the parties and issued an injunction against development of the land until the state of Hawaii reconciled with Native Hawaiians. The state appealed to the United States Supreme Court in 2008.

The issue was whether the Apology Resolution barred Hawaii from selling land held in public trust to third parties until the claims of Native Hawaiians had been resolved.

The OHA argued that the Apology Resolution changed the relationship between Native Hawaiians and the government and that it restored rights that had been lost in the 1893 revolution. The state disagreed by arguing that the language was intended only as an apology and that no changes in law had been made.

== Decision ==
Justice Samuel Alito wrote for a unanimous US Supreme Court, which reversed the Hawaii Supreme Court's ruling and held that the Apology Resolution had neither created new rights nor changed the relationship between the state and Native Hawaiians. The Apology Resolution used only conciliatory words, which are not used by Congress to create substantive rights.

The Apology Resolution noted that it did not serve as a settlement of any claims against the United States. However, a disclaimer of settling claims against one sovereign, the United States, cannot be read as an affirmative recognition of claims against another sovereign, Hawaii.

== Aftermath ==
After the decision, HFDC continued to develop the parcel, which will be called the Leiali'i Affordable Housing Project. It was expected to be complete by 2016. However, the plan was not finished. In 2022, the Hawaii Housing Finance and Development Corporation discussed potentially transferring the undeveloped Leialiʻi land, controlled by the state, to the Department of Hawaiian Home Lands.

In 2024, two temporary housing projects were announced on Leialiʻi land to house survivors displaced by the 2023 Maui wildfires.

== See also ==
- List of United States Supreme Court cases, volume 556
- List of United States Supreme Court cases
