= Alexander v. Gardner-Denver Co. =

- Supreme Court of the United States

Argued November 5, 1973 Decided February 19, 1974
- Full case name: Alexander v. Gardner-Denver Co.
- Docket no.: 72-5847
- Citations: 415 U.S. 36 (more) 94 S. Ct. 1011; 39 L. Ed. 2d 147

Case history
- Prior: Summary judgment granted, 346 F. Supp. 1012 (D. Colo. 1971); affirmed, 466 F.2d 1209 (10th Cir. 1972); cert. granted, 410 U.S. 925 (1973).
- Subsequent: On remand, 519 F.2d 503 (10th Cir. 1975), cert. denied, 423 U.S. 1058 (1976).

Holding
- An employee's statutory right to trial de novo under Title VII of the Civil Rights Act of 1964 is not foreclosed by prior submission of his claim to final arbitration under the nondiscrimination clause of a collective bargaining agreement.

Court membership
- Chief Justice Warren E. Burger Associate Justices William O. Douglas · William J. Brennan Jr. Potter Stewart · Byron White; Thurgood Marshall · Harry Blackmun; Lewis F. Powell Jr. · William Rehnquist

Case opinion
- Majority: Powell, joined by unanimous

Laws applied
- Title VII of the Civil Rights Act of 1964

Alexander v. Gardner-Denver Co., 415 U.S. 36 (1974), is a US labor law case, concerning arbitration with collective agreements for labor rights.

== Facts ==
Mr Harrell Alexander Sr., an employee at the Gardner-Denver Co. and member of the United Steelworkers filed a grievance claiming he had been wrongfully terminated for race discrimination under the Title VII of the Civil Rights Act of 1964. The arbitrator held that he was terminated for poor work performance.

The District Court granted summary judgment to the employer, based on the grievance procedure. The Court of Appeals for the Tenth Circuit upheld the District Court's ruling.

== Judgment ==
The Supreme Court held that the case should have been re-evaluated afresh.

Arbitral procedures, while well suited to the resolution of contractual disputes, make arbitration a comparatively inappropriate forum for the final resolution of rights created by Title VII. This conclusion rests first on the special role of the arbitrator, whose task is to effectuate the intent of the parties rather than the requirements of enacted legislation. Where the collective-bargaining agreement conflicts with Title VII, the arbitrator must follow the agreement. To be sure, the tension between contractual and statutory objectives may be mitigated where a collective-bargaining agreement contains provisions facially similar to those of Title VII. But other facts may still render arbitral processes comparatively inferior to judicial processes in the protection of Title VII rights. Among these is the fact that the specialized competence of arbitrators pertains primarily to the law of the shop, not the law of the land. United Steelworkers of America v. Warrior & Gulf Navigation Co., 363 U.S. 574, 581—583, 80 S.Ct. 1347, 1352—1353, 4 L.Ed.2d 1409 (1960). Parties usually choose an arbitrator because they trust his knowledge and judgment concerning the demands and norms of industrial relations. On the other hand, the resolution of statutory or constitutional issues is a primary responsibility of courts, and judicial construction has proved especially necessary with respect to Title VII, whose broad language frequently can be given meaning only by reference to public law concepts.

Moreover, the factfinding process in arbitration usually is not equivalent to judicial factfinding. The record of the arbitration proceedings is not as complete; the usual rules of evidence do not apply; and rights and procedures common to civil trials, such as discovery, compulsory process, cross-examination, and testimony under oath, are often severely limited or unavailable. See Bernhardt v. Polygraphic Co., 350 U.S. 198, 203, 76 S.Ct. 273, 276, 100 L.Ed. 199 (1956); Wilko v. Swan, 346 U.S., at 435—437, 74 S.Ct., at 186 188. And as this Court has recognized, '(a)rbitrators have no obligation to the court to give their reasons for an award.' United Steelworkers of America v. Enterprise Wheel & Car Corp., 363 U.S., at 598, 80 S.Ct., at 1361. Indeed, it is the informality of arbitral procedure that enables it to function as an efficient, inexpensive, and expeditious means for dispute resolution. This same characteristic, however, makes arbitration a less appropriate forum for final resolution of Title VII issues than the federal courts.

... the federal policy favoring arbitration of labor disputes and the federal policy against discriminatory employment practices can best be accommodated by permitting an employee to pursue fully both his remedy under the grievance arbitration clause of a collective-bargaining agreement and his cause of action under Title VII. The federal court should consider the employee’s claim de novo. The arbitral decision may be admitted as evidence and accorded such weight as the court deems appropriate.

== See also ==
- United States labor law
