= United States v. Denedo =

- Supreme Court of the United States

Decided June 8, 2009
- Full case name: United States v. Denedo
- Citations: 556 U.S. 904 (more)

Holding
- The military appellate courts have jurisdiction to hear a request for a writ of coram nobis.

Court membership
- Chief Justice John Roberts Associate Justices John P. Stevens · Antonin Scalia; Anthony Kennedy · David Souter; Clarence Thomas · Ruth Bader Ginsburg; Stephen Breyer · Samuel Alito

Case opinions
- Majority: Kennedy, joined by Stevens, Souter, Ginsburg, Breyer
- Concur/dissent: Roberts, joined by Scalia, Thomas, Alito

Laws applied
- All Writs Act

United States v. Denedo, 556 U.S. 904 (2009), was a United States Supreme Court case in which the court held that the military appellate courts have jurisdiction to hear a request for a writ of coram nobis.

== Background ==
Military authorities charged Denedo, a native Nigerian serving in the United States Navy, with violating of the Uniform Code of Military Justice (UCMJ). With counsel's assistance, Denedo agreed to plead guilty to reduced charges. The special court-martial accepted the plea and convicted and sentenced Denedo; the Navy-Marine Corps Court of Criminal Appeals (NMCCA) affirmed; and he was discharged from the Navy in 2000. In 2006, the Department of Homeland Security commenced deportation proceedings against Denedo based on the conviction. To avoid deportation, he filed a petition for a writ of coram nobis under the authority of the All Writs Act, asking the NMCCA to vacate the conviction it had earlier affirmed on the ground that his guilty plea resulted from ineffective assistance of counsel, who had assured him his plea bargain carried no risk of deportation. Though rejecting the government's contention that it lacked jurisdiction to grant the writ, the NMCCA denied relief for lack of merit. Agreeing that the NMCCA has jurisdiction, the Court of Appeals for the Armed Forces (CAAF) remanded for further proceedings on the merits. The government of the United States, contending that a writ of coram nobis directed to a final judgment of conviction is beyond the jurisdiction of the military courts, appealed to the United States Supreme Court.

== Opinion of the court ==
The Supreme Court issued an opinion on June 8, 2009.
