= Shinseki v. Sanders =

- Supreme Court of the United States

Decided April 21, 2009
- Full case name: Shinseki v. Sanders
- Citations: 556 U.S. 396 (more)

Holding
- The Federal Circuit's review of claims decisions made by the Department of Veterans Affairs must use the same harmless-error framework used in other civil cases.

Court membership
- Chief Justice John Roberts Associate Justices John P. Stevens · Antonin Scalia; Anthony Kennedy · David Souter; Clarence Thomas · Ruth Bader Ginsburg; Stephen Breyer · Samuel Alito

Case opinions
- Majority: Breyer, joined by Roberts, Scalia, Kennedy, Thomas, Alito
- Dissent: Souter, joined by Stevens, Ginsberg

Shinseki v. Sanders, 556 U.S. 396 (2009), was a United States Supreme Court case in which the court held that the Federal Circuit's review of claims decisions made by the Department of Veterans Affairs must use the same harmless-error framework used in other civil cases.
