= Van de Kamp v. Goldstein =

- Supreme Court of the United States

Decided January 26, 2009
- Full case name: Van de Kamp v. Goldstein
- Citations: 555 U.S. 335 (more)

Holding
- Prosecutors are absolutely immune from suit under 42 U.S.C. § 1983 for their claims based on management tasks such as their supervision or training of subordinates and their information-system organization.

Court membership
- Chief Justice John Roberts Associate Justices John P. Stevens · Antonin Scalia; Anthony Kennedy · David Souter; Clarence Thomas · Ruth Bader Ginsburg; Stephen Breyer · Samuel Alito

Van de Kamp v. Goldstein, 555 U.S. 335 (2009), was a United States Supreme Court case in which the court held that prosecutors are absolutely immune from suit under 42 U.S.C. § 1983 based on management tasks such as their supervision or training of subordinates and their information-system organization. Particularly, the lead prosecutor in this case was immune from suit for improperly supervising the disclosures made by line prosecutors pursuant to Brady v. Maryland.

== Background ==
Thomas Goldstein was released from a California prison after he filed a successful federal habeas petition alleging that his murder conviction depended, in critical part, on the false testimony of a jailhouse informant (Fink), who had received reduced sentences for providing prosecutors with favorable testimony in other cases; that prosecutors knew, but failed to give his attorney, this potential impeachment information; and that, among other things, that failure had led to his erroneous conviction. Once released, Goldstein filed this suit under 42 U. S. C. §1983, asserting the prosecution violated its constitutional duty to communicate impeachment information under Giglio v. United States due to the failure of petitioners, supervisory prosecutors, to properly train or supervise prosecutors or to establish an information system containing potential impeachment material about informants. Claiming absolute immunity, the prosecutors asked the federal District Court to dismiss the complaint, but the court declined, finding that the conduct was "administrative," not "prosecutorial," and hence fell outside the scope of an absolute immunity claim. The Ninth Circuit Court of Appeals, on interlocutory appeal, affirmed.

== Opinion of the court ==
The Supreme Court issued an opinion on January 26, 2009.
