= Haywood v. Drown =

- Supreme Court of the United States

Argued December 3, 2008 Decided May 26, 2009
- Full case name: Keith Haywood, Petitioner v. Curtis Drown, et al.
- Docket no.: 07-10374
- Citations: 556 U.S. 729 (more) 129 S. Ct. 2108; 173 L. Ed. 2d 920

Case history
- Prior: dismissal affirmed 9 N.Y.3d 481, 881 N.E.2d 180 (2008), reversed and remanded U.S.

Holding
- A state law barring state courts from hearing damages actions against corrections officers violates the Supremacy Clause by not permitting adjudication of claims under 42 USC 1983.

Court membership
- Chief Justice John Roberts Associate Justices John P. Stevens · Antonin Scalia; Anthony Kennedy · David Souter; Clarence Thomas · Ruth Bader Ginsburg; Stephen Breyer · Samuel Alito

Case opinions
- Majority: Stevens, joined by Kennedy, Souter, Ginsburg, Breyer
- Dissent: Thomas, joined by Roberts, Scalia, Alito (Part III)

Laws applied
- U.S. Const. art. VI (Supremacy Clause)

Haywood v. Drown, 556 U.S. 729 (2009), was a United States Supreme Court case in which the Court held that a New York law preventing state trial courts from hearing claims for money damages against prison employees whether based on federal or state law violated the Supremacy Clause of the United States Constitution.

== Background ==
The defendant in this trial, Keith Haywood, was an inmate at the Attica Correctional Facility, in Attica, New York In 2003 and 2004, Haywood was charged with multiple counts of misbehavior, including assaulting an officer, soliciting mail, and failing a drug test. After a guilty verdict, Haywood filed suit in a New York state court against two employees of the Attica Correctional facility to review the claims under 42 U.S.C. § 1983. The defendants moved to dismiss Haywood's claims based on a New York statute that banned inmates from filing suit against the "official capacities" of correctional officers of the state.

== Decision of the Supreme Court ==
Writing for the majority in favor of Haywood, Justice Stevens wrote the opinion of the Supreme Court. The court noted that the New York statute was passed to protect correctional facilities employees against "frivolous" damages suits filed by inmates. The Court found, however, that states "may not relieve whole categories of federal claims from their courts merely to avoid congestion."

== Dissenting opinions ==
In dissent, Justice Clarence Thomas note that "neither the Constitution nor Supreme Court precedent require that states open their courts to Section 1983 claims."

=== Arguments ===
The case was argued by Jason E. Murtagh, an attorney with Dechert, for the Petitioner, and by Barbara D. Underwood for Respondent.

== See also ==
- List of United States Supreme Court cases, volume 556
- List of United States Supreme Court cases
