= Abuelhawa v. United States =

- Supreme Court of the United States

Argued March 4, 2009 Decided May 26, 2009
- Full case name: Salman Khade Abuelhawa, petitioner v. United States
- Docket no.: 08-192
- Citations: 556 U.S. 816 (more) 129 S. Ct. 2102; 173 L. Ed. 2d 982

Case history
- Prior: Petitioner convicted, 1:07-cr-00018-LMB (E.D. Va. 2007); affirmed, 523 F.3d 415 (4th Cir. 2008).

Holding
- The use of a cell phone to purchase a misdemeanor amount of drugs does not rise to the level of it being a "communication facility" for the purposes of felony drug distribution.

Court membership
- Chief Justice John Roberts Associate Justices John P. Stevens · Antonin Scalia; Anthony Kennedy · David Souter; Clarence Thomas · Ruth Bader Ginsburg; Stephen Breyer · Samuel Alito

Case opinion
- Majority: Souter, joined by unanimous

Laws applied
- 21 U.S.C. § 843(b); 21 U.S.C. § 844(a)

Abuelhawa v. United States, 556 U.S. 816 (2009), was a United States Supreme Court case in which the Court held that a defendant who used a cellphone for the misdemeanor purchase of cocaine could not be charged with a felony for using a "communication facility" to facilitate the distribution of an illegal drug under 21 U.S.C. § 843(b).

== Historical context ==
On October 17, 2003, Salman Khade Abuelhawa was arrested for violating 21 U.S.C. § 843, after having his phone wiretapped by the Federal Bureau of Investigation for several months. The wiretapping began in June 2003 after the FBI obtained a Title III warrant, and the wiretapping uncovered that Abuelhawa had been coordinating the sale of cocaine in the Skyline Drive area of Virginia using his cell phone.

On January 25, 2007, in the U.S District Court for the Eastern District of Virginia, Abuelhawa was indicted by grand jury on seven counts of violating 21 U.S. Code § 843, specifically charging Abuelhawa with "unlawfully, knowingly, and intentionally using a communications facility — a telephone — in committing, causing, and facilitating the.. distribution of cocaine." Various of the counts were dismissed, but ultimately the district court sentenced Abuelhawa to 24 months probation and issued a $2,000 fine. Abuelhawa then filed a timely notice of appeal to the U.S. Court of Appeals for the Fourth Circuit.

== Court of Appeals decision ==
The Court of Appeals heard Abuelhawa's appeal and held oral arguments on March 19, 2008, and released its opinion on April 25, 2008. In a unanimous decision the Court held that § 843(b) does criminalize the facilitation of drug distributions for simple personal use. Interestingly, the appeal has no substantial discussion as to the issue which will eventually be taken up by the Supreme Court, with the only mention being that, "there is no dispute that Abuelhawa used a communication facility (a cell phone) to arrange the drug transactions".

Abuelhawa then further appealed this decision to the Supreme Court.

== Supreme Court decision ==
The Supreme Court granted certiorari and held oral arguments on March 4, 2009. Its opinion was released on May 26, 2009. In a unanimous opinion delivered by Justice Souter, the Court sided with Abuelhawa and reversed his conviction. The Court reasoned that the government's interpretation of "facilitate" exposed a first-time buyer using a phone "to punishment 12 times more severe than a purchase by a recidivist offender and 8 times more severe than the unauthorized possession of a drug used by rapists." Such a results was clearly not in line with Congress's intent, the Court concluded, because it conflicted with the classification of the drug sale itself as a misdemeanor.

The Court's decision reversed the Fourth Circuit's decision and remanded the case for further proceedings.
