= FCC v. Fox Television Stations, Inc. (2012) =

- Supreme Court of the United States

Argued January 10, 2012 Decided June 21, 2012
- Full case name: Federal Communications Commission, Petitioner v. Fox Television Stations, Respondent
- Docket no.: 10-1293
- Citations: 567 U.S. 239 (more) 132 S. Ct. 2307; 183 L. Ed. 2d 234; 2012 WL 2344462; 2012 U.S. LEXIS 4661

Case history
- Prior: Judgments for defendant on remand from FCC v. Fox (Fox I), 613 F.3d 317 (2nd Cir. 2010) and 663 F.3d 122 (3rd Cir. 2011); cert. granted, 564 U.S. 1036 (2011).

Holding
- Failure to give broadcasters fair notice, prior to the broadcasts in question, that fleeting expletives and momentary nudity could be found actionably indecent rendered the Federal Communications Commission's standards unconstitutionally vague as applied to those broadcasts.

Court membership
- Chief Justice John Roberts Associate Justices Antonin Scalia · Anthony Kennedy; Clarence Thomas · Ruth Bader Ginsburg; Stephen Breyer · Samuel Alito; Sonia Sotomayor · Elena Kagan

Case opinions
- Majority: Kennedy, joined by Roberts, Scalia, Thomas, Breyer, Alito, and Kagan
- Concurrence: Ginsburg (in judgment)
- Sotomayor took no part in the consideration or decision of the case.

Laws applied
- U.S. Const. amend. V

Federal Communications Commission v. Fox Television Stations, Inc., 567 U.S. 239 (2012), was a decision by the Supreme Court of the United States regarding whether the Federal Communications Commission's scheme for regulating speech is unconstitutionally vague. The Supreme Court excused the broadcasters from paying fines levied for what the FCC had determined indecency, in a majority opinion delivered by Justice Anthony Kennedy. The Supreme Court had previously issued an opinion in the case in 2009 addressing the nature of the fine itself, without addressing the restriction on indecent speech.

== Initial case ==
The case entered the Supreme Court's docket in October 2007 and specifically concerns obscene language and the word fuck being broadcast on the Fox television network from two Billboard Music Awards shows occurring in 2002 and 2003. On the December 9, 2002 ceremony, while accepting an artist achievement award for her career, Cher said "fuck 'em" regarding people who she believed criticized her; on the ceremony occurring on December 10, 2003, presenter Nicole Richie stated regarding her television show: "Why do they even call it The Simple Life? Have you ever tried to get cow shit out of a Prada purse? It's not so fucking simple."

In 2004, after those incidents and another incident in January 2003 involving NBC and the 2003 Golden Globes, where U2 lead singer Bono called the band's win for Best Original Song "really, really, fucking brilliant" in his acceptance speech, Federal Communications Commission (FCC) changed its rules on expletives to prohibit "single uses of vulgar words" under any circumstances, including previous instances where it gave leeway for "fleeting" expletives that networks unknowingly allowed to enter the airwaves. Fox was subsequently fined through its owned and operated television stations group, and challenged its fine in the courts. The United States Court of Appeals for the Second Circuit ruled in the initial case that the FCC cannot punish broadcast stations for such incidents. The FCC appealed to the Supreme Court, and in the 2009 case, the Supreme Court reversed the Second Circuit, finding that the new policy was not arbitrary. However, the issue of constitutionality was remanded to the Second Circuit, which had not considered the issue initially.

== Background ==
Upon remand to hear the initially deferred issue of constitutionality, the Second Circuit Court of Appeals re-heard the case in January 2010. On July 13, 2010, in a unanimous decision written by Judge Rosemary S. Pooler, the Second Circuit vacated the FCC order and policy on First Amendment grounds, finding that "by prohibiting all 'patently offensive' references to sex, sexual organs, and excretion without giving adequate guidance as to what 'patently offensive' means, the FCC effectively chills speech, because broadcasters have no way of knowing what the FCC will find offensive. To place any discussion of these vast topics at the broadcaster's peril has the effect of promoting wide self-censorship of valuable material which should be completely protected under the First Amendment." The Second Circuit added

We do not suggest that the FCC could not create a constitutional policy. We hold only that the FCC's current policy fails constitutional scrutiny."

The FCC requested that the full Second Circuit hear the case en banc, but was denied. The Supreme Court heard oral arguments in this round on January 10, 2012.

== Ruling ==
In an 8–0 decision written by Justice Anthony Kennedy, the Supreme Court ruled that because the regulations at the time did not cover "fleeting expletives" (the regulations have since been amended to that end), the fines issued were invalidated as "unconstitutionally vague" under the Due Process Clause. Because the case was resolved on that basis, the Court declined to address the First Amendment implications of the FCC's indecency regulations or to reconsider FCC v. Pacifica, 438 U.S. 726 (1978).

Justice Sonia Sotomayor recused herself because she had previously sat on the Second Circuit.

=== Ginsburg concurrence ===
Ginsburg authored a one-paragraph concurrence in which she agreed with the decision, but argued that the Supreme Court should have revisited Pacifica, as she felt it was "wrong when it was issued".

== See also ==
- Super Bowl XXXVIII halftime show controversy (FCC v. CBS), which led to new rules involving fleeting indecency as well as fleeting expletives
