= Bobby v. Bies =

- Supreme Court of the United States

Decided June 1, 2009
- Full case name: Bobby v. Bies
- Citations: 556 U.S. 825 (more)

Holding
- The Double Jeopardy Clause does not bar a courts from conducting a full hearing on a convicted defendant's mental capacity to determine if they are eligible for the death penalty.

Court membership
- Chief Justice John Roberts Associate Justices John P. Stevens · Antonin Scalia; Anthony Kennedy · David Souter; Clarence Thomas · Ruth Bader Ginsburg; Stephen Breyer · Samuel Alito

Case opinion
- Majority: Ginsburg, joined by unanimous

Laws applied
- Double Jeopardy Clause

Bobby v. Bies, 556 U.S. 825 (2009), was a United States Supreme Court case in which the court held that the Double Jeopardy Clause does not bar a courts from conducting a full hearing on a convicted defendant's mental capacity to determine if they are eligible for the death penalty.

== Background ==
In Atkins v. Virginia, the Supreme Court held that the Eighth Amendment does not permit the execution of mentally handicapped people. Prior to Atkins, mental disabilities merited consideration as a mitigating factor but did not prevent the death penalty.

Nearly a decade before Atkins, Bies was tried and convicted in Ohio of the aggravated murder, kidnapping, and attempted rape of a ten-year-old boy. Instructed at the sentencing stage to weigh mitigating circumstances (including evidence of Bies's mild-to-borderline mental disability) against aggravating factors (including the crime's brutality), the jury recommended a death sentence, which the trial court imposed. The Ohio Court of Appeals and Ohio Supreme Court affirmed the conviction and sentence, each concluding that Bies's mental disability was entitled to "some weight" as a mitigating factor but that the aggravating circumstances outweighed the mitigating circumstances. Bies then filed an unsuccessful petition for state post-conviction relief, contending for the first time that the Eighth Amendment prohibits execution of a defendant who is mentally handicapped.

Soon after Bies sought federal habeas relief, the Supreme Court decided Atkins. The opinion left to the states the task of developing appropriate ways to determine when a person claiming to be mentally handicapped would fall within Atkins's compass. Ohio heeded Atkins's call in State v. Lott. The federal District Court then stayed Bies' federal habeas proceedings so that he could present an Atkins claim to the state post-conviction court. Observing that Bies' mental handicap had not previously been established under the Atkins–Lott framework, the state court denied Bies's motion for summary judgment and ordered a full hearing on the Atkins claim.

Rather than proceeding with that hearing, Bies returned to federal court, arguing that the Double Jeopardy Clause barred the state from relitigating the mental handicap issue. The District Court granted the habeas petition, and the Sixth Circuit Court of Appeals affirmed. Relying on Ashe v. Swenson, the Court of Appeals determined that all requirements for the issue preclusion component of the Double Jeopardy Clause were met in Bies's case. It concluded that the Ohio Supreme Court, on direct appeal, had decided the mental handicap issue under the same standard that court later adopted in Lott, and that the state court's recognition of Bies's mental state had been necessary to the death penalty judgment. When the Sixth Circuit denied the State's petition for rehearing en banc, a concurring judge offered an alternative basis for decision. He opined that, under Sattazahn v. Pennsylvania, jeopardy attaches once a capital defendant is "acquitted" based on findings establishing an entitlement to a life sentence; reasoning that the Ohio courts' mental handicap findings entitled Bies to a life sentence, he concluded that the Double Jeopardy Clause barred any renewed inquiry into Bies's mental state.

== Opinion of the court ==
The Supreme Court issued an opinion on June 1, 2009.
