= 14 Penn Plaza LLC v. Pyett =

- Supreme Court of the United States

Argued December 1, 2008 Decided April 1, 2009
- Full case name: 14 Penn Plaza LLC, et al., Petitioners v. Steven Pyett, et al.
- Docket no.: 07-581
- Citations: 556 U.S. 247 (more) 129 S. Ct. 1456; 173 L. Ed. 2d 398
- Argument: Oral argument
- Opinion announcement: Opinion announcement

Case history
- Prior: Motion to dismiss or compel arbitration denied, Pyett v. Pa. Bldg. Co., 04-cv-7536 (NRB) (S.D.N.Y. June 1, 2006); reversed, 498 F.3d 88 (2d Cir. 2007); cert. granted, 552 U.S. 1178 (2008).

Holding
- A provision in a collective-bargaining agreement that clearly and unmistakably requires union members to arbitrate ADEA claims is enforceable as a matter of federal law. This CBA clearly and unmistakably requires respondents to arbitrate the age discrimination claims at issue in this appeal.

Court membership
- Chief Justice John Roberts Associate Justices John P. Stevens · Antonin Scalia; Anthony Kennedy · David Souter; Clarence Thomas · Ruth Bader Ginsburg; Stephen Breyer · Samuel Alito

Case opinions
- Majority: Thomas, joined by Roberts, Scalia, Kennedy, Alito
- Dissent: Souter, joined by Stevens, Ginsburg, Breyer
- Dissent: Stevens

Laws applied
- Age Discrimination in Employment Act (ADEA), 29 U.S.C. § 621 National Labor Relations Act, 29 U.S.C. § 159(a)

14 Penn Plaza LLC v. Pyett, 556 U.S. 247 (2009), is a United States labor law case decided by the United States Supreme Court on the rights of unionized workers to sue their employer for age discrimination. In this 2009 decision, the Court decided that whenever a union contract "clearly and unmistakably" requires that all age discrimination claims under the Age Discrimination in Employment Act of 1967 (ADEA) be decided through arbitration, then employees subject to that contract cannot have those claims heard in court.

Pyett's lawyers, in addition to arguing that a union could not legally bargain away an employee's right to pursue an ADEA claim in court, also argued that "the facts... [show that the union] Local32BJ... has not done so in this case." However, because these arguments had not been raised in the lower courts, the Supreme Court chose not to consider them and decided that the Collective Bargaining Agreement in this case did mandate that the employees' ADEA claims had to be resolved through arbitration.

Prior to the Supreme Court's decision in 14 Penn Plaza v. Pyett, employees who were covered under union contracts, often referred to as bargaining unit members, had been able to raise any claims of civil rights violations by their employer in court. This had been the case regardless of the language which was stated in their union contract, a document often referred to as a collective bargaining agreement, or CBA.

== Facts ==
Steven Pyett, Thomas O' Connell and Michael Phillips worked for Temco Service Industries, Inc., a maintenance service and cleaning contractor in New York City. Pyett and O'Connell were night watchmen and Phillips held a similar position as a night-starter at an office building owned by Pennsylvania Building Company and 14 Penn Plaza, LLC.

The men were members of the Service Employees International Union (SEIU) Local 32BJ. Their positions at Temco were covered under a collective bargaining agreement that their union Local 32BJ had signed with the Realty Advisory Board on Labor Relations (RAB). The RAB represented both Temco and 14 Penn Plaza in labor matters.

In August 2003, after receiving consent from the SEIU Local 32BJ, 14 Penn Plaza hired the unionized firm Spartan Security to provide licensed security guard services. Newly contracted security guards were assigned to the building where Pyett, O' Connell and Phillips worked, and Temco reassigned the men to other positions in the same building as night porters and light duty cleaners.

"As the only building employees over the age of 50," Pyett, O' Connell and Phillips believed that their job reassignments to less desirable and less lucrative positions were the result of age discrimination and requested that their union file a grievance over the matter.

The workers' age discrimination claims progressed through four stages spanning five years on its way to the Supreme Court. Here is a summary of that path.

=== Grievance and arbitration ===
The union filed grievances alleging that Pyett, O' Connell and Phillips' job reassignments had violated the collective bargaining agreement by:

1. discriminating against Pyett, O' Connell and Phillips on account of their age,
2. neglecting seniority rights by not promoting either Pyett or O'Connell to an assistant mechanic position, and
3. negatively affecting each of the three worker's wages by rotating overtime inequitably.

Arbitrator Earl Pfeffer held his initial hearing on the Pyett, O' Connell and Phillips grievances on February 2, 2004. A few weeks later, in a letter dated February 23, 2004, the union withdrew the charge of age discrimination from the grievances. Having previously agreed to the hiring of the licensed security guards, the union believed it could not "legitimately object to [the workers'] reassignments as discriminatory."

After several hearings, the arbitrator rendered his opinion on August 10, 2005, denying the other grievance claims.

=== Equal Employment Opportunity Commission ===
On May 26, 2004, Pyett, O' Connell and Phillips each filed age discrimination charges with the Equal Employment Opportunity Commission. After reviewing the evidence, the EEOC dismissed each of the men's complaints. Per the agency's practice when its investigation does not substantiate a charge that has been made, the EEOC issued each man a letter of Dismissal and Notice of Rights. The letters notified the men of their right to file a lawsuit in court.

=== District court ===
On August 21, 2004, Pyett, O' Connell and Phillips sued SEIU Local 32BJ. Their lawsuit claimed that the union had breached its duty of fair representation when it withdrew their age discrimination grievance charges. The workers later dropped their lawsuit against the union after the arbitrator rendered his decision on their remaining grievances in August 2005.

Then, on September 23, 2004, the men filed a lawsuit against Pennsylvania Building Company,14 Penn Plaza, LLC and Temco in District Court. The lawsuit charged that their job reassignments were in violation of the Age Discrimination in Employment Act.

The companies filed a motion to dismiss the charges as well as a motion to compel arbitration under sections 3 and 4 of the Federal Arbitration Act (FAA) [9 U. S. C. §§3]. On May 31, 2006, District Judge Naomi Reice Buchwald denied both motions. In denying the motion to compel arbitration, Judge Buchwald cited a phrase that would later be used by the Supreme Court in their decision to reverse the Court of Appeals ruling. She cited that it was "binding... precedent that even a clear and unmistakable union-negotiated waiver of a right to litigate certain... claims in a judicial forum is unenforceable."

=== U.S. Court of Appeals ===
On June 1, 2006, Pennsylvania Building Company,14 Penn Plaza, LLC and Temco appealed to the US Court of Appeals for the Second Circuit under section 16 of the Federal Arbitration Act. Their appeal again sought to compel the plaintiffs to resolve their claims of age discrimination through arbitration.

On August 1, 2007, Appeals Court Judge José Cabranes upheld the District Court's decision to deny the companies' motion to compel arbitration. In his decision he wrote that "mandatory arbitration clauses in collective bargaining agreements are unenforceable to the extent that they waive the rights of covered workers to a judicial forum for federal statutory causes of action."

The judge continued that "the District Court recognized... the distinction our Court has drawn between arbitration clauses in individual contracts... and arbitration clauses in [collective bargaining agreement]s." The former, he wrote, was "governed by a line of Supreme Court cases represented by Gilmer v. Interstate/Johnson Lane Corp.." The later was governed "by a line of Supreme Court cases represented by Alexander v. Gardner-Denver Co."

== Judgment ==
A sharply divided Supreme Court delivered a 5–4 decision in favor of 14 Penn Plaza and overturning the Second Circuit judge's decision. In doing so, the Court ruled that some collective bargaining agreements do require employees to pursue legal action under the Age Discrimination in Employment Act of 1967 through arbitration rather than in court. The Court also ruled that the CBA in this case did require ADEA claims to be arbitrated.

Justice Clarence Thomas authored the Court's opinion. He was joined in the majority by Chief Justice John Roberts, and Justices Antonin Scalia, Anthony Kennedy, and Samuel Alito.

In its decision, the Court flipped the Second Circuit's reasoning by rejecting the Gardner-Denver line of precedent and embracing that of its 1991 decision in Gilmer. In doing so, the Court eliminated the widely held legal distinction between mandatory arbitration agreements, like the one that had been upheld in Gilmer, and collective bargaining agreements, like the ones at issue in both Gardner-Denver and 14 Penn Plaza. This distinction, Justice Souter pointed out in his dissent, had consistently been observed by each of the U.S. Appeals Courts except the Fourth Circuit.

One major difference between the two types of agreements is that the former is signed directly by the individual effected by it, while the latter is signed by a union representative. Another difference is that the implementation of mandatory arbitration agreements is governed by a 1925 law called the Federal Arbitration Act (FAA). Union contracts, on the other hand, are governed by a different law passed in 1935 called the National Labor Relations Act (NLRA) and enforced by an "independent federal agency" called the National Labor Relations Board (NLRB).

Justice Thomas, writing for the majority, now concluded that "nothing in the law suggests a distinction" between the two types of agreements.

The 14 Penn Plaza majority opinion discerned that Gardner-Denver was decided correctly "on the narrow ground... that the collective bargaining agreement did not cover statutory claims." However, the majority strongly disputed Gardner-Denver and its descendant cases', "broad dicta" ("Judicial dictum is an opinion by a court on a question that is not essential to its decision even though it may be directly involved.") as based on a "misconceived view of arbitration that this Court has since abandoned." The majority identified three such "misconceptions".

The first misconception it identified was that to "submit statutory discrimination claims to arbitration was tantamount to a waiver of those rights". Rather, they concluded, "it waives only the right to seek relief from a court".

The second misconception was that arbitrators "competence... to decide legal issue[s]," as well the "informality" and "fact finding process" of arbitration make it an unsuitable venue to decide people's legal rights. Justice Thomas added that "the informality of arbitration is one of the chief reasons that parties select" it, and that arbitration's "more streamlined" procedures did not render them "inadequate".

The third misconception that the Court's opinion sought to refute was regarding the real or potential conflict of interest between a union as a whole and the individual members that make up its bargaining unit. Nothing in the text of the ADEA, the majority wrote, would justify "singling out an arbitration provision for disfavored treatment" "simply because of an alleged conflict of interest between a union and its members". It added "In any event, Congress has accounted for this conflict of interest" by allowing bargaining unit members to take legal action against their union with the National Labor Relations Board and the Equal Employment Opportunity Commission.

Lastly, the 14 Penn Plaza majority turned its attention to "respondents... series of arguments contending that the particular CBA at issue does not clearly and unmistakably require them to arbitrate their ADEA claims." These arguments centered around the collective bargaining agreement's provision that they gave the union, rather than individual bargaining unit members, complete control over whether, and for how long, to pursue a grievance. Therefore, "[a]bsent any [individual employee's] arbitration right, there is no... support [for] a motion to compel arbitration."

While the Court notes that it could still consider these arguments even though counsel for Pyett, O'Connell and Phillips had not raised them in the lower courts, it chose not to, citing a precedent set in Heckler v. Campbell. In that decision, the Court stated that it would address arguments that had not been raised in the lower courts "only in exceptional cases". The 14 Penn Plaza majority followed with "This is not an "exceptional case", and added that this issue "was not fully briefed to this or any court". Consequently, the Court "hesitat[ed] to invalidate arbitration agreements on the basis of speculation."

The Court concluded that the CBA at issue in this case "clearly and unmistakably requires respondents to arbitrate the age-discrimination claims at issue in this appeal".

=== Souter's dissent ===
Justice David Souter authored one of two dissenting opinions. He was joined by Justices John Paul Stevens, Ruth Bader Ginsburg and Stephen Breyer.

In Justice Souter's dissent, he disputes what he refers to as the majority's "bald assertion that "[n]othing in the law suggests a distinction between the status of arbitration agreements signed by an individual employee and those agreed to by a union representative." The "applicability of the Gardner-Denver rule" to this case, he writes, is "unquestionable" and that "[o]nce we have construed a statute, stability is the rule and... [t]here is no argument for abandoning precedent here."

The dissenting justices claim that the majority "misreads the case" of Gardner-Denver by concluding that its outcome hinged solely upon the scope, or specific language, of the collective bargaining agreement. "One need only read Gardner-Denver itself to know that it was not at all so narrowly reasoned."

Quoting from the text of the ADEA, Justice Souter notes that "'Any person aggrieved' under the Act 'may bring a civil action in any court of competent jurisdiction for legal or equitable relief' 29 U.S.C. §6269(c)."

The minority contends that "Congress itself has unsurprisingly understood Gardner-Denver the way we have repeatedly explained it and has operated on the assumption that a CBA cannot waive employees' rights to a judicial forum to enforce antidiscrimination statutes." They continue, "Congress has had [over] 30 years in which it could have corrected our decision ... if it disagreed with it, and has not chosen to do so."

Finally, Justice Souter speculates that the majority opinion may have a limited effect because it "explicitly" leaves unanswered the question of whether or not "a CBA's waiver of judicial forum is enforceable when the union controls access to and presentation of employees' claims in arbitration."

=== Stevens' dissent ===
In addition to signing onto Justice Souter's dissent, Justice John Paul Stevens authored an additional dissent. Justice Stevens criticized the majority for what he considered its "subversion of precedent". He expressed his opposition not only to the Court's "policy favoring arbitration" in the 14 Penn Plaza and Gilmer decisions, but also in a series of decisions from 1981 to 2001. In these cases, he wrote, "my colleagues were making policy choices not made by Congress."

Writing about Gardner-Denver, he concluded with "[i]n the absence of an intervening amendment" from Congress, we are "bound by that decision".

== Significance ==
The Supreme Court has since reversed several additional lower court rulings involving mandatory arbitration. 14 Penn Plaza has been heavily criticized in academic literature, and calls for its reversal through an Arbitration Fairness Act have been made.

=== Stolt-Nielsen v. Animalfeeds International Corp. ===
On April 27, 2010, the Supreme Court reversed a United States Court of Appeals for the Second Circuit decision regarding class action arbitration in Stolt-Nielsen v. Animalfeeds International Corp. Both parties had agreed that their arbitration agreement was silent on the issue of class actions. A panel of arbitrators decided that the customer could pursue class arbitration. Their decision was ultimately reversed by the Supreme Court.

=== AT&T Mobility v. Concepcion ===
On April 27, 2011, the Supreme Court reversed a United States Court of Appeals for the Ninth Circuit decision in AT & T Mobility v. Concepcion. Customers brought a class action suit against their cell phone company for false advertising and fraud. The Ninth Circuit court determined that the contract's arbitration clause, which precluded class arbitration, was unconscionable under California's Discover Bank rule. The rule allowed for a class action suit "where a party with superior bargaining power was alleged to have cheated large numbers of consumers out of individually small sums of money". The Supreme Court overruled this decision, holding that section 2 of the Federal Arbitration Act preempted the California rule.

=== Marmet Health Care Center v. Brown ===
On February 21, 2012, the Supreme Court overruled a Supreme Court of Appeals of West Virginia decision involving a state lawsuit brought by three families of nursing home patients in Marmet Health Care Center v. Brown. The state supreme court of appeals had allowed the family members of three nursing home patients who had died to sue the nursing homes for negligence. In doing so, it upheld a West Virginia state law prohibiting pre-dispute agreements that mandate arbitration of personal-injury or wrongful-death claims against nursing homes. The U.S. Supreme Court decided that the state rule violated the Federal Arbitration Act and vacated the state court's judgment.

=== Arbitration Fairness Act of 2011 ===
The Arbitration Fairness Act of 2011 was introduced in May 2011 by Senators Richard Blumenthal (D-CT), Al Franken (D-MN) and 11 Senate co-sponsors. A companion bill was introduced in the House of Representatives H.R. 1873 by Representative Henry "Hank" Johnson [D-GA] The bill, first introduced to Congress in 2007, leaves arbitration provisions in collective bargaining agreements between employers and labor unions unaffected "except that no such arbitration provision shall have the effect of waiving the right of an employee to seek judicial enforcement of a [federal or state law, or federal or state Constitutional] right or related public policy.

The bill would also bar the enforcement of mandatory arbitration clauses between corporations and consumers or non-union employees.

The bill's "findings" section states that:*Most consumers and employees have little or no meaningful choice whether to submit their claims to arbitration.

- Mandatory arbitration undermines the development of public law because there is inadequate transparency and inadequate judicial review of arbitrators' decisions.
- Arbitration can be an acceptable alternative when consent to the arbitration is truly voluntary, and occurs after the dispute arises.

The House Judiciary Committee referred the bill to the Subcommittee on Courts, Commercial and Administrative Law on June 1, 2011. The Senate Judiciary Committee held hearings on the Arbitration Fairness Act on October 13, 2011.

=== Community support for the bill ===
A wide coalition of organizations including social justice, public interest, labor, consumer protection, civil rights, housing and homeowner, health care advocacy, legal advocacy and other community groups are supporting the passage of the Arbitration Fairness Act of 2011 S.987 and H.R.1873.

In a letter to the House Judiciary Committee dated May 17, 2011, 48 organizations, including the American Civil Liberties Union, Consumer Action, the AFL–CIO and the NAACP, urged the committee to end the "predatory practice of forcing non-union employees and consumers to sign away their rights to legal protections and access to the courts". The practice, they write, allows corporations to "shield themselves from accountability for wrongdoing".

The letter also questions the impartiality of "arbitrators who rely on major corporations for repeat business" as well as the relative lack of oversight and "limit[ed] ... procedural protections and remedies otherwise available to individuals in a court of law."

The coalition of groups also oppose the "exorbitant filing fees, continuous fees for procedures such as motions and written findings, and "loser pays" rules in arbitration [which] are prohibitive to many individuals."

== See also ==
- US labor law
- US contract law
- Magna Carta 1215 clause 40, "To no one will we sell, to no one will we refuse or delay, right or justice."
