= Rivera v. Illinois =

- Supreme Court of the United States

Argued February 23, 2009 Decided March 31, 2009
- Full case name: Michael Rivera, Petitioner v. Illinois
- Docket no.: 07-9995
- Citations: 556 U.S. 148 (more) 129 S. Ct. 1446; 173 L. Ed. 2d 320

Case history
- Prior: Holding for the defendant, People v. Rivera, 227 Ill. 2d 1, 879 N.E.2d 876 (2007).

Holding
- Unintentional errors by the court, that would not have altered the proceedings of the case, do not warrant a new trial and do not violate the Sixth Amendment's clause of the right to a fair trial.

Court membership
- Chief Justice John Roberts Associate Justices John P. Stevens · Antonin Scalia; Anthony Kennedy · David Souter; Clarence Thomas · Ruth Bader Ginsburg; Stephen Breyer · Samuel Alito

Case opinion
- Majority: Ginsburg, joined by unanimous

Laws applied
- U.S. Const. amend. VI

Rivera v. Illinois, 556 U.S. 148 (2009), is a decision by the United States Supreme Court involving whether the rejection of a defendant's peremptory challenge to a juror constituted harmless error.

== Background of the case ==
Michael Rivera was convicted of two counts of first degree murder in 1998. He was then sentenced to eighty-five years in prison. During the pre-trial voir dire, Rivera's counsel used a peremptory challenge to have a juror removed from consideration. The judge deemed the challenge to be based on discriminatory factors and allowed the juror to be seated.

Rivera appealed, arguing that the trial judge erred in dismissing the peremptory challenge. The Illinois Supreme Court remanded the case for the trial court to explain why the peremptory challenge in question was discriminatory. The trial judge submitted gender discrimination as the relevant discriminatory factor.

Unsatisfied with this explanation, the Illinois Supreme Court held that Rivera was wrongly denied his challenge to dismiss the juror. The state supreme court found no evidence that Rivera's attorney used discriminatory considerations in arguing for the dismissal of the juror in question. Despite this, the state supreme court decided that such a mistake constituted a harmless error.

== U.S. Supreme Court ruling ==
James K. Leven argued the case for the petitioner. Michael A. Scodro argued the case for the respondent. Assistant to the Solicitor General Matthew D. Roberts argued the case for the United States, as amicus curiae, in support of the respondent.

The U.S. Supreme Court affirmed the Illinois Supreme Court decision in a unanimous opinion.

== See also ==
- List of United States Supreme Court cases, volume 556
- List of United States Supreme Court cases
