= Puckett v. United States =

- Supreme Court of the United States

Decided March 25, 2009
- Full case name: Puckett v. United States
- Citations: 556 U.S. 129 (more)

Holding
- Rule 52(b)'s plain error test applies to challenges of whether the prosecutor failed to follow through on a plea bargain, so those challenges generally cannot be made for the first time on appeal.

Court membership
- Chief Justice John Roberts Associate Justices John P. Stevens · Antonin Scalia; Anthony Kennedy · David Souter; Clarence Thomas · Ruth Bader Ginsburg; Stephen Breyer · Samuel Alito

Case opinions
- Majority: Scalia, joined by Roberts, Kennedy, Thomas, Ginsburg, Breyer, Alito
- Dissent: Souter, joined by Stevens

Laws applied
- Federal Rules of Criminal Procedure

Puckett v. United States, 556 U.S. 129 (2009), was a United States Supreme Court case in which the court held that Rule 52(b)'s plain error test applies to challenges of whether the prosecutor failed to follow through on a plea bargain, so those challenges generally cannot be made for the first time on appeal.

== Background ==
In exchange for petitioner Puckett's guilty plea, the prosecution agreed to request (1) a three-level reduction in his offense level under the Federal Sentencing Guidelines on the ground that he had accepted responsibility for his crimes; and (2) a sentence at the low end of the applicable Guidelines range. The federal District Court accepted the plea.

However, before Puckett was sentenced, he assisted in another crime. As a result, the prosecution opposed any reduction in Puckett's offense level, and the District Court denied the three-level reduction. On appeal, Puckett raised for the first time the argument that by backing away from its reduction request, the Government had broken the plea agreement.

The Fifth Circuit Court of Appeals found that Puckett had forfeited that claim by failing to raise it below; applied Federal Rule of Criminal Procedure Rule 52(b)'s plain-error standard for unpreserved claims of error; and held that, although the error had occurred and was obvious, Puckett had not satisfied the third prong of plain-error analysis in that he failed to demonstrate that his ultimate sentence was affected, especially since the District Judge had found that acceptance-of-responsibility reductions for defendants who continued to engage in criminal activity were so rare as "to be unknown."

== Opinion of the court ==
The Supreme Court issued an opinion on March 25, 2009.
