= Michigan v. Jackson =

- Supreme Court of the United States

Argued December 9, 1985 Decided April 1, 1986
- Full case name: Michigan v. Robert Bernard Jackson; Michigan v. Rudy Bladel
- Citations: 475 U.S. 625 (more) 106 S. Ct. 1404; 89 L. Ed. 2d 631; 1986 U.S. LEXIS 91
- Argument: Oral argument

Case history
- Prior: People v. Bladel, 106 Mich. App. 397, 308 N.W.2d 230 (Mich. Ct. App. 1981); 118 Mich. App. 498, 325 N.W.2d 421 (Mich. Ct. App. 1982); People v. Jackson, 114 Mich. App. 649, 319 N.W.2d 613 (Mich. Ct. App. 1982); People v. Bladel, 421 Mich. 39, 365 N.W.2d 56 (Mich. 1986)

Holding
- The Sixth Amendment right to counsel requires that if police initiate an interrogation after a defendant's assertion of his right to counsel at an arraignment or similar proceeding, any waiver of that right for that police-initiated interrogation is invalid.

Court membership
- Chief Justice Warren E. Burger Associate Justices William J. Brennan Jr. · Byron White; Thurgood Marshall · Harry Blackmun; Lewis F. Powell Jr. · William Rehnquist; John P. Stevens · Sandra Day O'Connor

Case opinions
- Majority: Stevens, joined by Brennan, White, Marshall, Blackmun
- Concurrence: Burger (in judgment)
- Dissent: Rehnquist, joined by Powell, O'Connor

Laws applied
- U.S. Const. amend. VI
- Overruled by
- Montejo v. Louisiana, 556 U.S. 778 (2009)

Michigan v. Jackson, 475 U.S. 625 (1986), was a case decided by the United States Supreme Court regarding the Sixth Amendment's right to counsel in a police interrogation. In a decision written by Justice Stevens, the Court held that once an accused individual has claimed a right to counsel at a plea hearing or other court proceeding, a waiver of that right during later police questioning would be invalid unless the accused individual initiated the communication.

This decision was overruled by the Supreme Court in Montejo v. Louisiana, by a 5–4 vote.

== Facts ==
=== Respondent Bladel ===
Respondent Rudy Bladel had been convicted of murdering three railroad employees at the Amtrak station in Jackson, Michigan, on December 31, 1978.

Bladel, a disgruntled former employee, had been arrested three months later in Indiana and extradited to Michigan. He had agreed to talk to the police without counsel. At his arraignment he requested that counsel be appointed for him because he was indigent. The detective in charge of the investigation was present at the arraignment. A notice of appointment was then mailed to a law firm, but before the law firm received the notice, two police officers interviewed Bladel in the county jail and obtained a confession from him. Prior to that questioning, the officers had advised Bladel of his Miranda rights. Although Bladel had inquired about his representation several times since the arraignment, he was not told that a law firm had been appointed to represent him.

Bladel then objected to the admissibility of the confession but the trial court overruled his objection. He was convicted and sentenced to three life sentences to run consecutively. On appeal from his conviction and sentence, Bladel challenged the confession. The Michigan Court of Appeals first rejected that challenge and affirmed the conviction, but, after reconsideration in the light of a recent decision by the State Supreme Court, it reversed and remanded for a new trial. The Michigan Supreme Court then granted the prosecutor's application for leave to appeal, and considered the case with respondent Jackson's appeal of his conviction.

=== Respondent Jackson ===
Respondent Robert Bernard Jackson had been convicted of second-degree murder and conspiracy to commit second-degree murder after allegedly taking part in a wife's plan to have her husband killed on July 12, 1979. He made a number of statements to police after his arrest but before his arraignment. During his arraignment, Jackson requested that counsel be appointed for him.

On the following morning, before he had an opportunity to consult with counsel, two police officers obtained another statement from Jackson to "confirm" that he was the person who had shot the victim. As was true of the prearraignment statements, the questioning was preceded by advice of his Miranda rights and Jackson's agreement to proceed without counsel being present.

The Michigan Court of Appeals held that Jackson's later statement was properly received in evidence. Accordingly, it affirmed Jackson's conviction of murder, although it set aside the conspiracy conviction on unrelated grounds.

=== Michigan Supreme Court ===
The Michigan Supreme Court held that the postarraignment statements in both cases should have been suppressed.

The U.S. Supreme Court had held previously in Edwards v. Arizona, 451 U.S. 477 (1981), that an accused person in custody who has,

expressed his desire to deal with the police only through counsel is not subject to further interrogation by the authorities until counsel has been made available to him, unless the accused himself initiates further communication, exchanges, or conversations with the police.

The Court of Appeals had distinguished the Edwards rule on the ground that Jackson's request for an attorney had been made at his arraignment, whereas Edwards' request had been made during a custodial interrogation by the police. Noting that the Sixth Amendment right to counsel attached at the time of the arraignments, the Michigan Supreme Court concluded that the Edwards rule,

applies by analogy to those situations where an accused requests counsel before the arraigning magistrate. Once this request occurs, the police may not conduct further interrogations until counsel has been made available to the accused, unless the accused initiates further communications, exchanges, or conversations with the police. . . . The police cannot simply ignore a defendant's unequivocal request for counsel.

== United States Supreme Court decision ==
The Supreme Court of the United States granted certiorari and affirmed the Michigan Supreme Court's decision in a 6 to 3 decision.

=== Majority and concurrence ===
Justice Stevens wrote for the majority and was joined by Justices Brennan, White, Marshall and Blackmun.

The Court had held previously that the "Sixth Amendment guarantees the accused, at least after the initiation of formal charges, the right to rely on counsel as a 'medium' between him and the State." Maine v. Moulton, 474 U.S. 159 (1985) at 176. The Court found that therefore, the Sixth Amendment right to counsel at a postarraignment interrogation required at least as much protection as the Fifth Amendment right to counsel at any custodial interrogation.

Justice Stevens wrote,

Edwards is grounded in the understanding that "the assertion of the right to counsel [is] a significant event," 451 U.S. at 451 U.S. 485, and that "additional safeguards are necessary when the accused asks for counsel." Id. at 451 U.S. 484. We conclude that the assertion is no less significant, and the need for additional safeguards no less clear, when the request for counsel is made at an arraignment and when the basis for the claim is the Sixth Amendment. We thus hold that, if police initiate interrogation after a defendant's assertion, at an arraignment or similar proceeding, of his right to counsel, any waiver of the defendant's right to counsel for that police-initiated interrogation is invalid. Although the Edwards decision itself rested on the Fifth Amendment and concerned a request for counsel made during custodial interrogation, the Michigan Supreme Court correctly perceived that the reasoning of that case applies with even greater force to these cases.

Chief Justice Burger, concurred in the judgment saying that stare decisis called for "following the rule of Edwards in this context, but plainly the subject calls for reexamination."

=== Dissent ===
Justice Rehnquist wrote a dissenting opinion joined by Justice Powell and Justice O'Connor. The dissent explained,

Edwards did not confer a substantive constitutional right that had not existed before; it 'created a protective umbrella serving to enhance a constitutional guarantee.'

The prophylactic rule of Edwards, designed from its inception to protect a defendant's right under the Fifth Amendment not to be compelled to incriminate himself, simply does not meaningfully apply to the Sixth Amendment.

== Aftermath ==
The holding in Michigan v. Jackson was narrowed later by the Court in McNeil v. Wisconsin, which held that an accused's invocation of his Sixth Amendment right to counsel during a judicial proceeding does not constitute an invocation of the right to counsel derived by Miranda v. Arizona, from the Fifth Amendment's guarantee against compelled self-incrimination. "Therefore, while a defendant who has invoked his Sixth Amendment right to counsel with respect to the offense for which he is being prosecuted may not waive that right, he may waive his Miranda–based right not to be interrogated about unrelated and uncharged offenses." Also the Court held in Michigan v. Harvey that evidence acquired in violation of Michigan v. Jackson could be used for impeachment purposes.

Rudy Bladel was retried, found guilty and sentenced to three concurrent life sentences with no possibility of parole added to the sentence. He died in Jackson, Michigan on November 15, 2006 of thyroid cancer.

On March 27, 2009, the Supreme Court ordered lawyers in a pending case, Montejo v. Louisiana, (Docket No.07-1529), to file new briefs on whether the Court should overrule its decision in Michigan v. Jackson. On May 26, 2009 the Supreme Court overruled Michigan v. Jackson through the Court's decision in Montejo v. Louisiana.
