= Corley v. United States =

- Supreme Court of the United States

Decided April 6, 2009
- Full case name: Corley v. United States
- Citations: 556 U.S. 303 (more)

Holding
- 18 U. S. C. §3501 modified the McNabb–Mallory doctrine but did not supplant it.

Court membership
- Chief Justice John Roberts Associate Justices John P. Stevens · Antonin Scalia; Anthony Kennedy · David Souter; Clarence Thomas · Ruth Bader Ginsburg; Stephen Breyer · Samuel Alito

Case opinions
- Majority: Souter, joined by Stevens, Kennedy, Ginsburg, Breyer
- Dissent: Alito, joined by Roberts, Scalia, Thomas

Laws applied
- 18 U.S.C. § 3501

Corley v. United States, 556 U.S. 303 (2009), was a United States Supreme Court case in which the court held that 18 U. S. C. §3501 modified the McNabb–Mallory doctrine but did not supplant it.

== Background ==
McNabb v. United States and Mallory v. United States generally render inadmissible confessions made during periods of detention that violate the prompt presentment requirement of Federal Rule of Criminal Procedure 5(a). Rule 5(a), in turn, provides that a "person making an arrest... must take the defendant without unnecessary delay before a magistrate judge...." Congress enacted 18 U. S. C. §3501 in response to Miranda v. Arizona and some applications of the McNabb–Mallory rule. In an attempt to eliminate Miranda, §3501(a) provides that "a confession... shall be admissible in evidence if it is voluntarily given," and §3501(b) lists several considerations for courts to address in assessing voluntariness. Subsection (c), which focuses on McNabb–Mallory, provides that "a confession made... by... a defendant... , while... under arrest... , shall not be inadmissible solely because of delay in bringing such person before a magistrate judge... if such confession is found by the trial judge to have been made voluntarily and... within six hours [of arrest]"; it extends that time limit when further delay is "reasonable considering the means of transportation and the distance to... the nearest available [magistrate]."

Johnnie Corley was arrested for assaulting a federal officer at about 8 a.m. Around 11:45, FBI agents took him to a Philadelphia hospital to treat a minor injury. At 3:30 p.m., he was taken from the hospital to the local FBI office and told that he was a suspect in a bank robbery. Though the office was in the same building as the nearest magistrate judges, the agents did not bring him before a magistrate judge, but questioned him, hoping for a confession. At 5:27 p.m., some 9.5 hours after his arrest, Corley began an oral confession that he robbed the bank. He asked for a break at 6:30 and was held overnight. The interrogation resumed the next morning, ending with his signed written confession. He was finally presented to a Magistrate Judge at 1:30 p.m., 29.5 hours after his arrest, and charged with armed bank robbery and related charges.

The federal District Court denied his motion to suppress his confessions under Rule 5(a) and McNabb–Mallory. It reasoned that the oral confession occurred within §3501(c)'s six-hour window because the time of Corley's medical treatment should be excluded from the delay. It also found the written confession admissible, explaining there was no unreasonable delay under Rule 5(a) because Corley had requested the break. He was convicted of conspiracy and bank robbery.

The Third Circuit Court of Appeals affirmed. Relying on Circuit precedent to the effect that §3501 abrogated McNabb–Mallory and replaced it with a pure voluntariness test, it concluded that if a district court found a confession voluntary after considering the points listed in §3501(b), it would be admissible, even if the presentment delay was unreasonable.

== Opinion of the court ==
The Supreme Court issued an opinion on April 6, 2009.
