= United States ex rel. Eisenstein v. City of New York =

- Supreme Court of the United States

Argued April 21, 2009 Decided June 8, 2009
- Full case name: United States ex rel. Irwin Eisenstein v. City of New York, New York, et al.
- Docket no.: 08-660
- Citations: 556 U.S. 928 (more) 129 S. Ct. 2230; 173 L. Ed. 2d 1255

Holding
- Where the Government has not intervened or actively participated, private plaintiffs under the False Claims Act must file an appeal within 30 days of the judgment or order being appealed, according to the Federal Rules of Appellate Procedure.

Court membership
- Chief Justice John Roberts Associate Justices John P. Stevens · Antonin Scalia; Anthony Kennedy · David Souter; Clarence Thomas · Ruth Bader Ginsburg; Stephen Breyer · Samuel Alito

Case opinion
- Majority: Thomas, joined unanimously

Laws applied
- False Claims Act

United States ex rel. Eisenstein v. City of New York, 556 U.S. 928 (2009), is a United States Supreme Court decision holding that where the Government has not intervened or actively participated, private plaintiffs under the False Claims Act must file an appeal within 30 days of the judgment or order being appealed, according to the Federal Rules of Appellate Procedure.

== Background ==
The Eisenstein case arose out of New York City's decision to require government employees who do not live in the City to pay a fee equivalent to the municipal income taxes paid by employees who do live there. Irwin Eisenstein and four other city employees who do not live in New York sued the city, pro se (i.e., representing themselves without being represented by attorneys), alleging that the policy violated – among other things – the federal False Claims Act, which imposes civil liability on any person who “knowingly presents, or causes to be presented, to an officer or employee of the United States Government . . . a false or fraudulent claim for payment or approval.” The False Claims Act is unique because, while the federal government is always the "real party in interest" (as the one allegedly being defrauded), the statute allows a private plaintiff (known as a "relator" under the FCA) to sue qui tam (on the government's behalf) since the relator is "partially assigned" part of the government's legal injury.

The False Claims Act provides:

(b) Actions by private persons … (1) A person may bring a civil action for a violation of section 3729 [31 U.S.C. § 3729] for the person and for the United States Government. The action shall be brought in the name of the Government.

— 31 U.S.C. § 3730

Despite this provision, the United States does not need to participate in False Claims Act litigation. After conducting an investigation, the government may choose to intervene and take over the litigation. However, even if it decides not to do so, the FCA statute provides the government a right to be involved in the action and to receive a majority share of any monetary recovery. The government also has a right to intervene later, if it can show good cause for doing this. Where the government does not intervene, the False Claims Act provides the government a right to receive copies of the parties' pleadings and deposition transcripts (rights usually reserved for parties to a suit).

The district court dismissed Eisenstein's claim for failure to state a claim and entered final judgment in favor of the City of New York. Eisenstein filed notice of appeal from that judgment 54 days later. Six months after Eisenstein filed his notice of appeal, the Second Circuit ordered the parties to brief the issue of what time limit for filing the notice of appeal applied in this case, where the action was conducted in the name of the United States but the government had declined to intervene. Rule 4(a)(1)(A) of the Federal Rules of Appellate Procedure (FRAP) gives a party 30 days to appeal in a civil case, but the rule gives “any party” 60 days to appeal when the United States is a party to the action. The City of New York later filed a motion to dismiss the appeal as untimely.

The Second Circuit concluded that because the United States was not a “party” to the action, the special FRAP 60-day time limit did not apply. Therefore, it dismissed the appeal as untimely.

== Supreme Court ==
The Supreme Court of the United States granted the petition for certiorari, allowing it to review the case, in January 2009.

The petitioner (Eisenstein & co.) argued that the government was considered both a "party in interest" and a "party" under the FCA statute. As a result, the Federal Rules of Appellate Procedure would have allowed petitioners 60 days to file their appeal, and the Second Circuit would likely have been found to have had jurisdiction to hear their appeal.

The respondent (the City of New York) argued that only individuals or entities that actually participate in and control the qui tam litigation can qualify as “parties” to an action. Because the Government neither intervened nor participated in the qui tam action, and it could not have appealed the decision without first seeking leave to do so, the respondents argued that the 30 day time limit set out in the Federal Rules of Appellate Procedure should apply.

Three amicus briefs were filed in the case as well.

Oral arguments indicated that Congress provided no express answer within the False Claims Act text or legislative history regarding whether the United States should be considered a "party" to a qui tam action when it declines to intervene. As both parties pointed out, a qui tam action is unique and the government has unique rights, even when it declines to intervene; it is not a stranger to the litigation. By the terms of the statute, the government is the "real party in interest" in an FCA suit. The United States is also named in the caption of the case, and it receives the bulk of any monetary recovery. In sum, the United States bears some of the characteristics of a party and some characteristics of a non-party.

Associate Justice Clarence Thomas wrote for a unanimous Court, holding that the FRAP 30-day time limit applies to a private relator's claim under the False Claims Act where the government has not intervened. Thus, the Court affirmed the Second Circuit's finding that it lacked jurisdiction to hear an appeal of the dismissal of the private parties' suit against New York since the appeal had been filed in an untimely manner.
