= Jimenez v. Quarterman =

- Supreme Court of the United States

Argued November 4, 2008 Decided January 13, 2009
- Full case name: Jimenez v. Quarterman
- Docket no.: 07-6984
- Citations: 555 U.S. 113 (more) 129 S. Ct. 681; 172 L. Ed. 2d 475; 2009 U.S. LEXIS 579

Case history
- Prior: No. 06-11240 (5th Cir. May 25, 2007); cert. granted, 552 U.S. 1256 (2008).
- Subsequent: On remand, Jimenez v. Thaler, 367 F. App'x 489 (5th Cir. 2010).

Holding
- A state conviction is not "final" for the purpose of filing a federal habeas petition when a state court grants an out-of-time appeal.

Court membership
- Chief Justice John Roberts Associate Justices John P. Stevens · Antonin Scalia; Anthony Kennedy · David Souter; Clarence Thomas · Ruth Bader Ginsburg; Stephen Breyer · Samuel Alito

Case opinion
- Majority: Thomas, joined by unanimous

Laws applied
- 28 U.S.C. § 2244(d)(1)(A), Antiterrorism and Effective Death Penalty Act of 1996

Jimenez v. Quarterman, 555 U.S. 113 (2009), was a decision in which the Supreme Court of the United States held that under 28 U.S.C. § 2244(d)(1)(A), the conviction of a state defendant is not "final" if a state court grants an "out-of-time" appeal and the defendant has not yet filed a federal habeas petition.

== Background ==
In 1996 the United States enacted the Antiterrorism and Effective Death Penalty Act, which among other provisions set strict limits on the ability of criminal defendants convicted in state courts to file a federal appeal. Under 28 U.S.C. § 2244(d)(1)(A), an appeal had to be filed within one year from the time a judgment became "final."

Carlos Jimenez was convicted of burglary in the state of Texas in 1995. Jimenez appealed to the Texas Court of Appeals; his attorney filed a brief "explaining that he was unable to identify any nonfrivolous ground on which to base an appeal". Through a miscommunication Jimenez never learned of this brief until well after the fact, and his appeal was dismissed on September 11, 1996. Jimenez appealed, and on September 25, 2002, the Texas Court of Criminal Appeals granted Jimenez the right to file a so-called "out-of-time" appeal, acknowledging that his original appeal was flawed. The court affirmed his conviction. Jimenez then filed a habeas petition with the District Court, which dismissed his appeal, arguing that the one-year time limit began on October 11, 1996, in the wake his first (flawed) appeal. Jimenez then appealed to the Court of Appeals, which upheld the District Court.

The Supreme Court granted certiorari.

== Decision ==
In a unanimous opinion authored by Justice Thomas, the Supreme Court held that "the statute requires a federal court, presented with an individual's first petition for habeas relief, to make use of the date on which the entirety of the state direct appellate review process was completed" and that the granting of the right to an out-of-time appeal by the Texas Court of Appeals rendered Jimenez's conviction not final for the purposes of the statute.

The Court reversed the Court of Appeals and remanded the case.

== See also ==
- List of United States Supreme Court cases, volume 555
- List of United States Supreme Court cases
