= Kansas v. Ventris =

- Supreme Court of the United States

Decided April 29, 2009
- Full case name: Kansas v. Ventris
- Citations: 556 U.S. 586 (more)

Holding
- A statement collected in violation of the Sixth Amendment may be admissible to impeach inconsistent testimony at trial.

Court membership
- Chief Justice John Roberts Associate Justices John P. Stevens · Antonin Scalia; Anthony Kennedy · David Souter; Clarence Thomas · Ruth Bader Ginsburg; Stephen Breyer · Samuel Alito

Case opinions
- Majority: Scalia
- Dissent: Stevens, joined by Ginsburg

Kansas v. Ventris, 556 U.S. 586 (2009), was a United States Supreme Court case in which the court held that a statement collected in violation of the Sixth Amendment may be admissible to impeach inconsistent testimony at trial.

== Background ==
Donnie Ray Ventris and Rhonda Theel were charged with murder and other crimes. Prior to trial, an informant planted in Ventris's cell heard him admit to shooting and robbing the victim, but Ventris testified at trial that Theel committed the crimes. When the State sought to call the informant to testify to his contradictory statement, Ventris objected. The State conceded that Ventris's Sixth Amendment right to counsel had likely been violated, meaning it was not admissible for the State's case-in-chief. However, the State argued that the statement was admissible for impeachment purposes. The trial court allowed the testimony. The jury convicted Ventris of aggravated burglary and aggravated robbery. Reversing, the Kansas Supreme Court held that the informant's statements were not admissible for any reason, including impeachment.

== Opinion of the court ==
The Supreme Court issued a writ of certiorari to the Supreme Court of Kansas. It opined that the accused's statement to the informant, concededly elicited in violation of the Sixth Amendment, was admissible to impeach his inconsistent testimony at trial.
