= Montejo v. Louisiana =

- Supreme Court of the United States

Argued January 13, 2009 Decided May 26, 2009
- Full case name: Jesse Jay Montejo, Petitioner v. Louisiana
- Docket no.: 07-1529
- Citations: 556 U.S. 778 (more) 129 S. Ct. 2079; 173 L. Ed. 2d 955; 2009 U.S. LEXIS 3973

Case history
- Prior: affirmed 974 So. 2d 1238 (La. 2008), vacated and remanded

Holding
- A defendant may validly waive his right to counsel for police interrogation, even if police initiate the interrogation after the defendant's 6th Amendment right to counsel had attached at an arraignment or similar proceeding. Michigan v. Jackson is overruled.

Court membership
- Chief Justice John Roberts Associate Justices John P. Stevens · Antonin Scalia; Anthony Kennedy · David Souter; Clarence Thomas · Ruth Bader Ginsburg; Stephen Breyer · Samuel Alito

Case opinions
- Majority: Scalia, joined by Roberts, Kennedy, Thomas, Alito
- Concurrence: Alito, joined by Kennedy
- Dissent: Stevens, joined by Souter, Ginsburg; Breyer (except footnote 5)
- Dissent: Breyer

Laws applied
- U.S. Const. amend. VI
- This case overturned a previous ruling or rulings
- Michigan v. Jackson, 475 U.S. 625 (1986)

Montejo v. Louisiana, 556 U.S. 778 (2009), is a 5–4 decision by the United States Supreme Court that overruled the Court's decision in Michigan v. Jackson. The case concerned the validity of a defendant's waiver of his right to counsel during a police interrogation. In reversing Jackson, the Court said such a waiver was valid.

== Facts ==
At a preliminary hearing, Montejo was charged with first-degree murder. Montejo was also appointed court-ordered counsel, which he neither expressly requested nor denied. Later that day, while in prison, police read Montejo his Miranda rights, and he agreed to go along on a trip to locate the murder weapon. While in the police car, Montejo wrote an inculpatory letter of apology to the victim's widow. Only upon return did Montejo first finally meet his court-appointed attorney. At trial, the letter of apology was admitted over Montejo's objection. The jury convicted Montejo of first-degree murder, and he was sentenced to death. The crime in which he was convicted of was shooting and killing 61-year-old Louis Ferrari at his home in the Slidell area on September 2, 2002.

== Supreme Court's decision ==
In a decision written by Justice Scalia, the Court expressly overturned Michigan v. Jackson, 475 U.S. 625 (1986), asserting that requiring an initial “invocation” of the right to counsel in order to trigger the Jackson presumption, might work in States that require an indigent defendant formally to request counsel before an appointment is made, but not in more than half the States, which appoint counsel without request from the defendant.

Justice Alito filed a concurring opinion. Justice Stevens, who had written the Opinion of the Court in Jackson, filed a dissenting opinion in which Justice Souter and Justice Ginsburg joined. Justice Breyer joined that dissenting opinion, except for footnote 5. Justice Breyer also filed a separate dissenting opinion.

== Analysis ==
The Fifth Amendment's right to counsel attaches upon invocation (i.e., when an attorney is requested). The Sixth Amendment's right to counsel attaches when adversarial proceedings begin (i.e., at the arraignment). The presumption in Jackson attempted to analogize the Fifth Amendment's right against self-incrimination through Edwards v. Arizona to the Sixth Amendment's right to counsel, essentially not allowing police interrogation after the right attached. Under Montejo, in the case where the Defendant has not asserted his Fifth Amendment's right to counsel but rather relies on his Sixth Amendment's right to counsel, police may reinitiate interrogation after his Miranda rights have been read. However, if a Defendant has asserted his Fifth Amendment's right to counsel and adversarial proceedings have begun, police may not reinitiate questioning without counsel present and waiver under Edwards, or unless the Defendant initiates the conversation and police get a waiver. Criticisms of the Montejo decision include arguments that the case's importation of Fifth Amendment rationale into Sixth Amendment contexts "has resulted in a blurring of the line between legitimate law enforcement efforts and illegitimate police deception."
