= FCC v. Fox Television Stations, Inc. (2009) =

- Supreme Court of the United States

Argued November 4, 2008 Decided April 28, 2009
- Full case name: Federal Communications Commission, Petitioner v. Fox Television Stations, Respondent
- Docket no.: 07-582
- Citations: 556 U.S. 502 (more) 129 S. Ct. 1800; 173 L. Ed. 2d 738; 2009 U.S. LEXIS 3297

Case history
- Prior: Fox Television Stations, Inc. v. FCC, 489 F.3d 444 (2d Cir. 2007); cert. granted, 552 U.S. 1255 (2008).
- Subsequent: On remand, 613 F.3d 317 (2nd Cir. 2010); cert. granted, 564 U.S. 1036 (2011); vacated and remanded, FCC v. Fox TV Stations, Inc., 567 U.S. 239 (2012).

Holding
- The Federal Communications Commission had not acted arbitrarily when it changed a long-standing policy and implemented a new ban on even "fleeting expletives" from the airwaves. The Court explicitly declined to decide whether the new rule is constitutional, and sent that issue back to the lower courts for their review.

Court membership
- Chief Justice John Roberts Associate Justices John P. Stevens · Antonin Scalia; Anthony Kennedy · David Souter; Clarence Thomas · Ruth Bader Ginsburg; Stephen Breyer · Samuel Alito

Case opinions
- Majority: Scalia, joined by Roberts, Thomas, Alito; Kennedy (all but Part III–E)
- Concurrence: Thomas
- Concurrence: Kennedy (in part)
- Dissent: Stevens
- Dissent: Ginsburg
- Dissent: Breyer, joined by Stevens, Souter, Ginsburg

Laws applied
- Administrative Procedure Act

Federal Communications Commission v. Fox Television Stations, Inc., 556 U.S. 502 (2009), is a decision by the United States Supreme Court that upheld regulations of the Federal Communications Commission that ban "fleeting expletives" on television broadcasts, finding they were not arbitrary and capricious under the Administrative Procedure Act. The constitutional issue, however, was not resolved and was remanded to the Second Circuit and re-appealed to the Supreme Court for a decision in June 2012.

== Background ==
The case entered the Supreme Court's docket in October 2007 and concerns obscene language, specifically the word fuck being broadcast on the Fox television network from two Billboard Music Awards shows from 2002 and 2003. In the 2002 show, presenter Cher said "fuck 'em" regarding people who she believed criticized her; in the 2003 show, presenter Nicole Richie stated regarding her television show: “Why do they even call it The Simple Life? Have you ever tried to get cow shit out of a Prada purse? It's not so fucking simple.”

In 2004, the FCC prohibited "single uses of vulgar words" under any circumstances, including previous instances where it gave leeway for "fleeting" expletives that networks unknowingly allowed to enter the airwaves. However, the United States Court of Appeals for the Second Circuit ruled in the case Fox et al. v. Federal Communications Commission (06-1760) that the FCC cannot punish broadcast stations for such incidents.

On the week of March 17, 2008, the Supreme Court announced that it would hear this case. The Supreme Court heard oral arguments in the case on November 4, 2008, which was also Election Day.

== Supreme Court decision ==
The Supreme Court announced their decision in the case on April 28, 2009. In a 5-4 vote, they ruled that the Federal Communications Commission had not acted arbitrarily when it changed a long-standing policy and implemented a new ban on even "fleeting expletives" from the airwaves. The Court declined to decide whether the new rule is constitutional, and sent the issue back to the lower courts for their review. Justice Antonin Scalia, in the majority opinion, wrote: "The FCC's new policy and its order finding the broadcasts at issue actionably indecent were neither arbitrary nor capricious." In the dissenting opinion, Justice John Paul Stevens claimed that this decision was hypocritical given the presence of television commercials for products treating impotence or constipation. In its decision, "the court did not definitively settle the First Amendment implications of allowing a federal agency to censor broadcasts," and left that issue for the Second Circuit Court of Appeals. However, Justice Clarence Thomas's separate opinion openly stated his willingness to overturn Federal Communications Commission v. Pacifica Foundation and Red Lion Broadcasting Co. v. Federal Communications Commission, the two cases on which all FCC authority rest, even as he joined the majority on procedural grounds.

== Subsequent history ==
Upon remand, the Second Circuit addressed the actual Constitutionality of the fleeting expletive rules, striking it down in July 2010. The FCC re-appealed the case. On June 21, 2012, the Court decided the re-appeal narrowly, striking down the fines as unconstitutionally vague, but upholding the authority of the FCC to act in the interests of the general public when licensing broadcast spectrums to enforce decency standards, so long as they are not vague, without violating the First Amendment.

== See also ==
- FCC v. Pacifica Foundation
- List of United States Supreme Court cases, volume 556
- List of United States Supreme Court cases
