= Tobacco politics =

Politics surrounding the use and distribution of tobacco

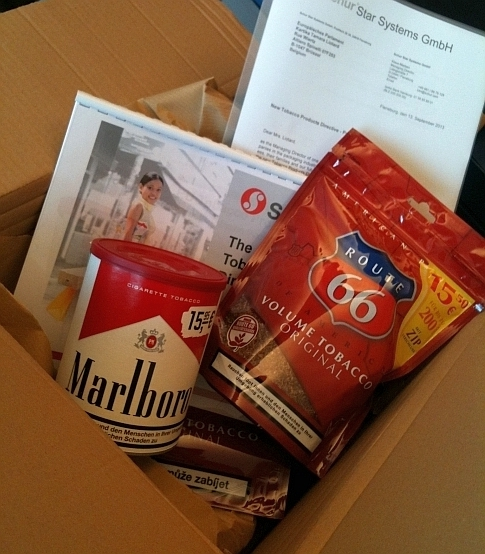
Gift offered by tobacco industry lobbyists to Dutch politician Kartika Liotard in 2013

Tobacco politics refers to the politics surrounding the use and distribution of tobacco, likewise with regulations.

In the United States, from the 1950s until the 1990s, tobacco industries wielded great influence in shaping public opinion on the health risks of tobacco. Despite the efforts of public health advocates, scientists, and those affected by smoking, both Congress and courts favored the tobacco industry in policy and litigation. It was not until the 1990s that public health advocates had more success in litigating against tobacco industries, including the 1998 Master Settlement Agreement between major tobacco companies and 46 state attorneys general. Although public opinion in the United States on tobacco use is generally unfavorable, many large tobacco companies continue to find success internationally, and tobacco companies have expanded into other product categories, such as electronic cigarettes, as traditional tobacco use declines.

As of 2018, 169 states have signed the World Health Organization (WHO) Framework Convention on Tobacco Control (FCTC), which governs international tobacco control. However, many nations have had difficulty complying with the FCTC, with higher rates of smoking especially in developing nations. There are currently almost 1.3 billion smokers globally.

== Tobacco control regulations ==
=== Taxation ===
Tobacco has been taxed by state governments in the United States for decades. The cumulative revenue of US tobacco taxation exceeded $32 billion in 2010, establishing a major revenue stream for government. That said, revenue from US tobacco taxation peaked in 2010 at $17.2 billion, and has steadily decreased every year since then with revenue in 2023 at $11.6 billion.

The US Contraband Cigarette Trafficking Act of 1978, a law that makes cigarette smuggling a felony punishable by up to 5 years in federal prison, is a means to prosecute smugglers who avoid paying duties on cigarettes. The Stop Tobacco Smuggling in the Territories Act of 2013 (H.R. 338; 113th Congress), proposed during the 113th United States Congress, would have updated the Contraband Cigarette Trafficking Act to include American Samoa, the Commonwealth of the Northern Mariana Islands, and Guam, which were previously not extended to by the law. Although the bill was successfully passed in the House of Representatives, after much debate and discussion, it ultimately failed to gain approval in the Senate. This failure could have been due to a variety of factors, such as opposition from senators with differing political views, concerns over specific provisions within the bill, or procedural hurdles that prevented it from moving forward. As a result, despite its initial success in the House, the bill was unable to proceed through the full legislative process and become law.

=== Cigarette advertising ===
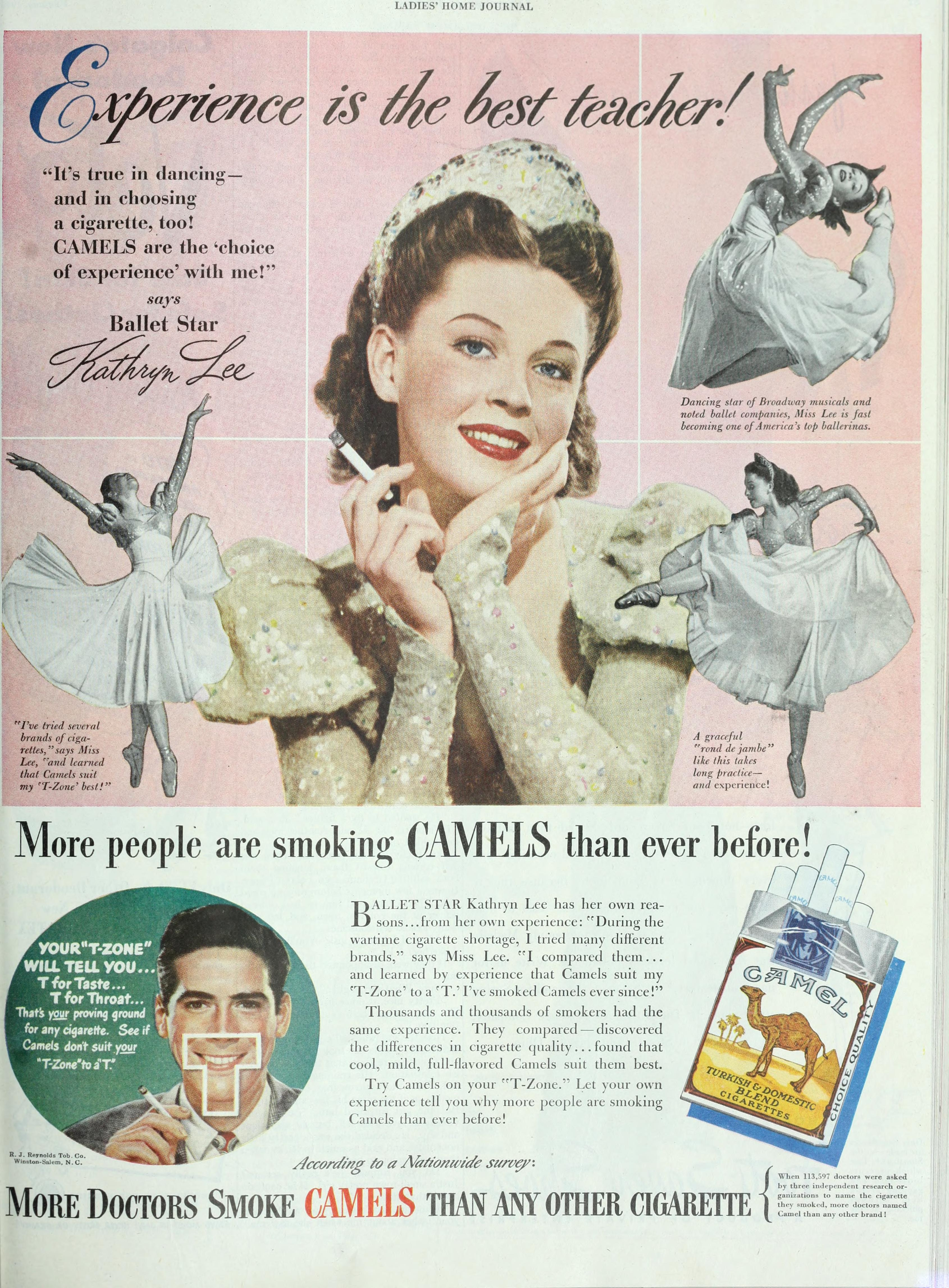
1948 advertisement for Camel cigarettes

In numerous parts of the world, tobacco advertising and sponsorship of sporting events is prohibited. The ban upon tobacco advertising and sponsorship in the European Union (EU) in 2005 prompted Formula One management to look for venues that permit display of the livery of tobacco sponsors, and led to some of the races on the calendar being cancelled in favor of more 'tobacco-friendly' markets. As of 2007, only one Formula One team, Scuderia Ferrari, received sponsorship from a tobacco company; Marlboro branding appeared on its cars in three races (Bahrain, Monaco, and China), all in countries lacking restrictions on tobacco advertising. Since 2018 Philip Morris International (PMI) and British American Tobacco (BAT) have circumvented the EU ban by using corporate mission statements and associated branding to link their ‘potentially reduced risk’ products to Formula One (F1) and Grand Prix motorcycle (MotoGP) racing teams. In 2022, PMI and BAT spent an estimated $40 million sponsoring the Ferrari and McLaren teams. Advertising billboards for tobacco remain used in Germany, whilst the majority of EU member states have outlawed them.

MotoGP team Ducati Marlboro received sponsorship from Marlboro, its branding appeared at the race in Qatar and China. On July 1, 2009, Ireland prohibited the advertising and display of tobacco products in all retail outlets.

== Lobby ==
Major tobacco lobbying companies include Altria Group (the parent company of Philip Morris USA), Philip Morris International, and Reynolds American.

=== 20th century ===
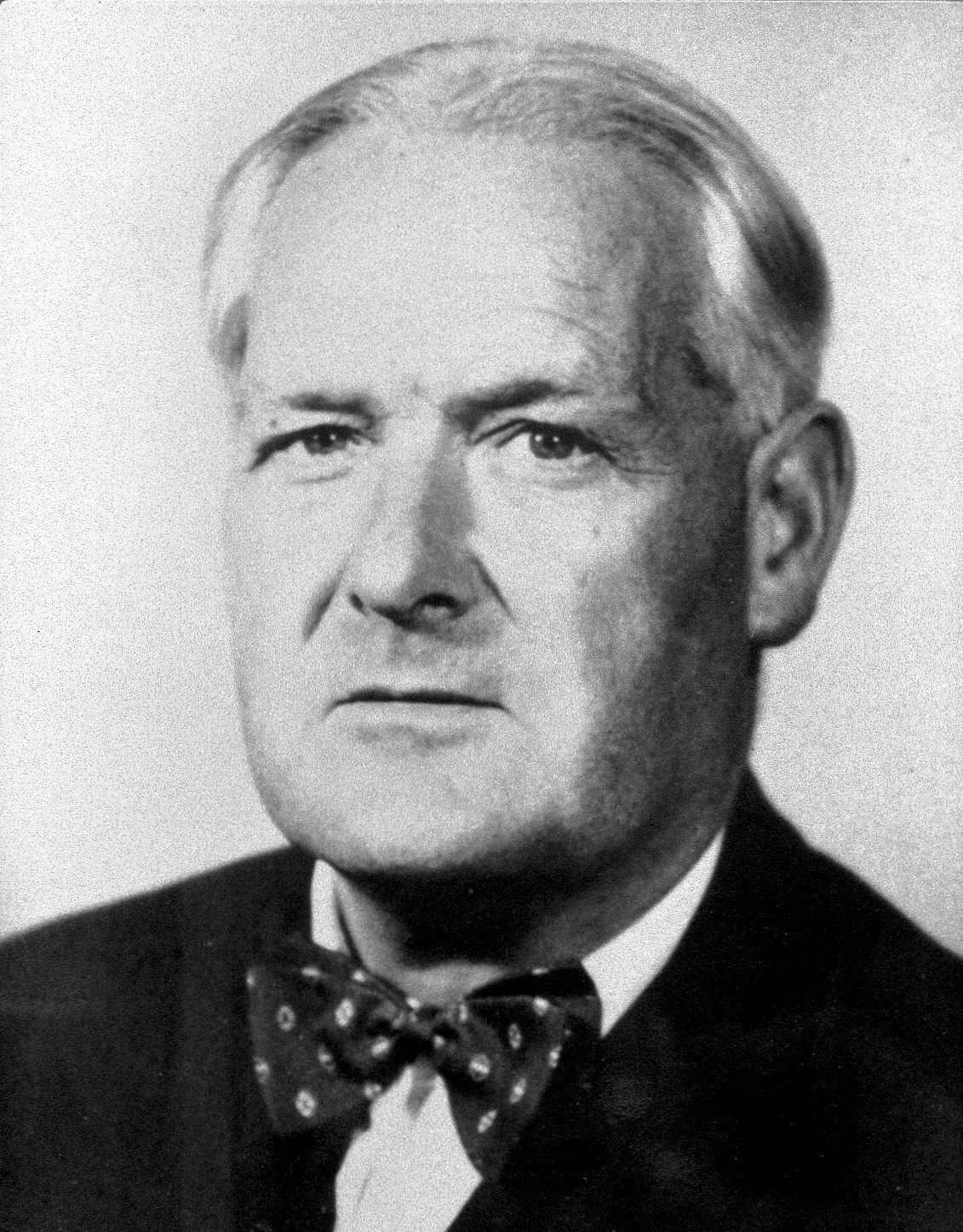
A. Bradford Hill, alongside Richard Doll, published several studies demonstrating a causal relationship between smoking and lung cancer.

In the early 1950s, numerous studies demonstrated a causal relationship between smoking and lung cancer. Worried that these studies would negatively impact tobacco consumption, tobacco companies met together and hired the public relations firm Hill & Knowlton. In 1954, tobacco companies published a joint press release called "A Frank Statement", which cast doubt on studies linking smoking and cancer and called for more research. In addition, these tobacco industries formed the Tobacco Industry Research Committee (TIRC), which challenged the science of smoking's relation to cancer. TIRC's first director was Clarence Cook Little, whose background in genetic science gave TIRC the appearance of scientific credibility. Other scientists who were skeptical of the causal link between smoking and cancer also joined the Scientific Advisory Board (SAB) of TIRC, although many amongst these scientists expressed concern over TIRC's strong denial of the link between the two.

In 1964, the Surgeon General released a report confirming the causal link between smoking and cancer. Tobacco industries formed the Tobacco Institute, a trade association that acted as a lobby for tobacco industries in Congress. This lobbying was generally successful, as the tobacco industry was well-funded and Southern states relied on tobacco revenues. For example, after the Federal Trade Commission (FTC) mandated health warning labels on cigarette packaging, tobacco companies successfully requested Congressional regulation in place of FTC regulation. The Federal Cigarette Labeling and Advertising Act (FCLAA) of 1965 originally required cigarette warning labels to include a warning of cancer, but this was removed from the final bill.

Although tobacco companies had considerable influence throughout the twentieth century, anti-tobacco advocates also had some success. In 1967, anti-tobacco advocates successfully argued that the fairness doctrine of the Federal Communications Commission (FCC) mandated time for anti-smoking advertisements equal to time allotted for smoking advertisements. In 1998, amidst growing evidence against tobacco companies, especially after the release of several industry documents, and growing public attitudes against smoking, states and tobacco companies entered a Master Settlement Agreement. This settlement included payments to states, restrictions on advertisements, and free access to internal industry research, although some have criticized the settlement for shielding the industry from future lawsuits, granting a monopoly to the largest tobacco companies, creating "client states" dependent on settlement payments, and shifting the cost of cigarettes to individual smokers rather than companies. In addition, tobacco companies have expanded their operations abroad, arguably undermining the impact of the settlement.

=== 21st century ===
Tobacco companies continue to have a large role in politics, albeit not as extensively as during the twentieth century. In 1990, the contributions of tobacco lobbies totaled over $70 million. In 2017, tobacco lobbies paid $21.8 million. Tobacco companies tend to donate more to Republican candidates, contributing over $50 million since 1990 to Republicans, including former Vice President Mike Pence. Although multiple proposals for relaxed electronic cigarette regulation, such as the Cole-Bishop Amendment in the 2017 omnibus bill and FDA Deeming Authority Clarification Act of 2017, have emerged, none have passed yet. In 2006, courts ordered tobacco companies to run anti-smoking advertisements, but tobacco companies delayed this order through multiple appeals until 2017. As of 2017, tobacco companies must now run advertisements detailing the negative health impacts of smoking for a year. In a measure to curb the use of E-cigarettes among youth, the U.S. FDA banned the promotion and sale of flavored vaping products in January 2020.

In 2017, Philip Morris International established the Foundation for a Smoke-Free World and fully funds it (to the tune of $80 million per year over twelve years) to endorse new tobacco industry products.

== Litigation ==
Lawsuits have been filed against varying tobacco manufacturers, attempting to hold them to account for wrongful death, injury, or medical expenses related to cigarette smoking and other tobacco use. Cases have been brought both by individual plaintiffs and by government officials, including the U.S. States Attorney General. Punitive damages for the plaintiff have often been awarded as a result of a successful litigation. However, the vast majority of court decisions have been in favour of the defendant tobacco companies.

=== History ===
The history of tobacco litigation in the United States can be divided into three waves: (1) from 1954 to 1973, (2) from 1983 to 1992, and (3) from 1994 until today. During the first two waves, tobacco companies had enormous success, winning all but one of their cases, with the only case they lost, Cipollone v. Liggett, being reversed.

During the first wave, a growing abundance of evidence linked tobacco to death and disease. Individual smokers filed lawsuits against the tobacco industry, claiming negligence in manufacturing and advertising, breach of warranty, and product liability. However, the tobacco industry responded by challenging the science of smoking causing disease and claiming that smokers assumed any risks.

During the second wave, plaintiffs charged tobacco companies with failure to warn about the addiction and disease risk of cigarettes and strict liability. The tobacco companies argued that people assumed the risks of smoking and that federal laws preempted state laws, in which the lawsuits were filed. In addition, the tobacco industry poured a massive amount of money into these cases, trying to overwhelm plaintiffs with legal costs. An internal memorandum by an attorney for the RJ Reynolds tobacco company described their strategy as, "To paraphrase General Patton, the way we won these cases was not by spending all of our money, but by making that other son of a bitch spend all [of] his."

The third wave of tobacco litigation was much more successful for plaintiffs, with plaintiffs winning 41% of cases between 1995 and 2005. It also saw a greater number and variety of lawsuits overall. State attorneys general charged the tobacco industry with using misleading marketing, targeting children, and concealing the health effects of smoking. These cases resulted in settlements across all fifty states in the United States.

Recently, there has been mixed success for plaintiffs in tobacco litigation. In Florida, a large class action lawsuit was rejected because the court argued that each case must be proven. As a result, thousands of individual lawsuits were filed against tobacco companies, but many of these verdicts are now on appeal. Smokers have also challenged light cigarettes, alleging that tobacco companies falsely advertise light cigarettes as healthier. Tobacco companies argue that 'light' refers to the taste, not the filters, and also used preemption arguments. Although the Supreme Court ruled in Altria Group, Inc. v. Good (2008) that federal law does not preempt certain state consumer protection laws, no courts have ruled on these laws being violated.

=== Significant cases ===
- 1992: In Cipollone v. Liggett Group, Inc. the US Supreme Court held that the Surgeon General's warning did not preclude suit by smokers against tobacco companies on several claims, and that the federal laws on tobacco regulation aren't worded to override state laws.
- 1995: The Supreme Court of Canada in RJR-MacDonald Inc. v. Canada (Attorney General) upheld the constitutionality of the federal Tobacco Products Control Act, but struck out the provisions which prevented tobacco advertising and unattributed health warnings.
- March 2001: The US Supreme Court affirmed the Circuit Court's ruling that the Food and Drug Administration could not classify tobacco as a pharmaceutical, so it could not control its production through the Food, Drug and Cosmetic Act. (FDA v. Brown & Williamson Tobacco Corp.)
- June 2002: A District Court in Kansas awarded $15 million in punitive damages against R.J. Reynolds Tobacco after calling the company's conduct "highly blameworthy and deserving of significant punishment." (David Burton vs. R.J. Reynold's Tobacco)
- June 2002: A Miami jury held three cigarette companies liable for $37.5 million in a lawsuit involving an ex–smoker who lost his tongue to tobacco–related oral cancer. (Lukacs vs. Philip Morris)
- October 2002: A Los Angeles jury issued $28 billion in punitive damages against Philip Morris. This was later reduced to $28 million. (Betty Bullock vs. Philip Morris)
- 2003: A Madison County, Illinois jury awarded $10.1 billion against the tobacco company Philips Morris for deceptive cigarette advertising in a class action led by attorney Stephen Tillery (Price v. Philip Morris).
- 2004: A New York jury issued $20 million to the wife of a long-term smoker who died of lung cancer at the age of 57. This was the first time that a New York court had held a tobacco company liable for an individual smoker's death. (Gladys Frankson vs. Brown and Williams Tobacco Corp)
- 2005: In Imperial Tobacco v. British Columbia, the Supreme Court of Canada found that the provincial Tobacco Damages and Health Care Costs Recovery Act, which allowed the government to sue tobacco companies, was constitutionally valid.
- 2007: Philip Morris USA v. Williams led the US Supreme Court to tell the Oregon Court of Appeals to reconsider its earlier judgment and lower the case's punitive damages amount in light of State Farm v. Campbell. The appeals court ultimately upheld their original damages.
- 2008: The Altria Group v. Good US Supreme Court case said that state law is not preempted by a federal law regarding cigarette advertisement regulations.

=== Grounds of claims ===
Civil Rights
Tobacco companies have marketed menthol cigarettes specific to African Americans; groups have pursued civil rights remedies in court.
Design defects
Claims of design defects allege that tobacco companies designed tobacco products with additional adverse health risks. Examples of design defects include cigarettes that increase addiction risks and deliberately choosing not to develop less harmful cigarettes.
In response, tobacco companies have argued that they have not intentionally made cigarettes more dangerous, but instead carefully and thoughtfully design the least hazardous tobacco product for smokers.
Strict liability
Under a theory of strict liability, a tobacco company is responsible for any damages or injuries resulting from the use of cigarettes, even if there is no showing of negligence.
Product liability
The liability of any or all parties along the chain of manufacture, distribution, and sale of any product for damage or injury caused by that product.
Depriving of health hazards information
Lawsuits against tobacco companies have asserted that tobacco companies mislead the public on the risks of smoking, environmental smoke, and nicotine addiction.

=== Defenses ===
Volenti non fit injuria
Volenti non fit injuria, or "to a willing person, no injury is done", is a common law doctrine which states, when applied to these cases, that there is no damage to someone who willingly places themselves in a position where they are negatively affected by tobacco consumption.
Contributory negligence
Contributory negligence is a common law defense to a claim based on negligence, where, before the cases, the adverse effects were unknown. This has been one of the commonly used defences. Most of them will assert that it was the plaintiff himself who has contributed to his own injury as he had prior knowledge of the harm associated with tobacco smoking.

Tobacco advertising fails to influence non-smokers

In 2006, tobacco companies argued that tobacco advertisements were intended for smokers choosing between brands of tobacco products. Moreover, advertising has a limited effect on influencing smoking behavior. Therefore, tobacco advertisements do not play a role in driving non-smokers to smoke.

Epidemiology cannot show causation

Tobacco companies have claimed that epidemiological evidence cannot show direct causation in individuals. This reasoning was used in the 2005 McTear v. Imperial Tobacco Limited case in Scotland, arguing that the plaintiffs could not reasonably prove that the plaintiffs’ smoking caused lung cancer. In addition, tobacco companies challenge the way epidemiological evidence is collected.

== Litigation outside of the United States ==
=== Introduction ===
As of 2000, litigation also continued in several countries outside the United States. Citing third-party reimbursement, several countries, such as Bolivia, Guatemala, Nicaragua, and Venezuela, have filed lawsuits both in the United States and in their own courts against tobacco industries. As of 2000, individual suits have also been filed in a multitude of countries, including Argentina, Finland, France, Japan, Ireland, Israel, Norway, Sri Lanka, Thailand, and Turkey.

The US signed the FCTC on May 10, 2004, albeit never ratified the treaty.

=== WHO Framework Convention on Tobacco Control ===
The World Health Organization (WHO) Framework Convention on Tobacco Control (FCTC), adopted in 2003, represents an important landmark in international tobacco control governance. It was formalized on February 27, 2005, and as of 2009, 169 states have signed the treaty. The United States is one of seven countries that have signed but not ratified the FCTC. The FCTC encourages states to reduce tobacco production and use through measures like cigarette taxes, restrictions on advertising, clean air controls, plain packaging and tobacco smuggling legislation.

Before 1998, the concept of an international tobacco control treaty received little enthusiasm. However, in 1998, Gro Harlem Brundtland became director general of the WHO, creating momentum for the FCTC. Organizations and events within the United States also played a key role in the creation and adoption of the FCTC globally. The American Public Health Association helped support the development of the FCTC, while the wave of successful tobacco litigation helped generate interest in tobacco control. However, the FCTC lacks mandates on transboundary tobacco issues. As a result, implementation of the treaty fell short, despite widespread ratification. In response, organizations such as Bloomberg Philanthropies and the Bill and Melinda Gates Foundation increased their philanthropic contributions to the WHO, creating MPOWER tobacco control, which focuses on implementation of FCTC.

=== Australia ===
In Australia, tobacco companies have faced several lawsuits, although not to the scale of litigation in the United States. In 1991, the Federal Court found advertisements denying environmental smoke to be misleading. In the 1999 case Nixon v. Philip Morris (Australia) Ltd, plaintiffs claimed tobacco companies misled them on the risks of smoking, although the Courts ruled the case could not continue as representative proceedings (similar to class action lawsuits in the United States). Personal injury cases are less common in Australia, as unsuccessful plaintiffs must pay the legal fees of the defendant, less profit incentives exist for Australian lawyers, and momentum from successful tobacco litigation has not been generated.

McCabe v British American Tobacco (2002) was the first personal injury case outside the United States to win a verdict against a tobacco company. The plaintiff, Rolah McCabe, who was diagnosed with lung cancer, claimed British American Tobacco Australia misled her in estimating the risk for smoking cigarettes. The verdict was later overturned, although McCabe died before the court proceedings finished. This case has been influential in litigation and legislation concerning document destruction, as British American Tobacco destroyed several documents in this case.

In 2005, a court-enforceable settlement between the Australian Competition and Consumer Commission (ACCC) and Philip Morris (Australia) Limited, British American Tobacco Limited, and Imperial Tobacco Australia Limited, was reached. The companies agreed to stop describing cigarettes as light and mild and provide $9 million for corrective advertising, in exchange for the ACCC to no longer pursue certain legal action against the companies. Afterwards, the companies started to describe cigarettes with terms such as rich, classic, smooth, fine, ultimate, refined, and chilled.

Tobacco companies have not been the only defendants in tobacco litigation. In cases regarding environmental smoke, the defendants are often the owners or managers of locations where environmental smoke occurs. In Meeuwissen v Hilton Hotels of Australia Pty Ltd (1997), the plaintiff argued environmental smoke in a nightclub constituted unlawful discrimination based on disability, and was awarded $AU2000 in compensation. Aside from disability discrimination, environmental smoke lawsuits have also cited common law negligence, occupational health and safety law, and occupiers’ law. The result of such litigation has been increased bans on smoking in the workplace and certain public places.

Tobacco companies have also initiated litigation domestically and internationally, claiming government measures against tobacco have infringed on their commercial rights. In 2011, the Australian government introduced plain packaging legislation. Philip Morris Asia Limited challenged this directive under a bilateral trade agreement with Hong Kong, but did not succeed. Cuba, Honduras, the Dominican Republic and Indonesia also filed a World Trade Organization complaint, but the WTO upheld the plain packaging law in 2017.

Some magazines have not yet ended tobacco advertising within their issues, largely because it remains unprohibited on a legal basis, likewise with promotions as well as free public distribution, mounting concern amongst organisations as a result.

=== Austria ===
Austria subscribed to the WHO anti-tobacco convention on December 14, 2005.

=== Bhutan ===
The Tobacco Control Act of Bhutan 2010 prohibits the cultivation, manufacture, sale, and distribution of tobacco products within Bhutan

=== Brazil ===
In Brazil, tobacco litigation focuses on three main areas: compensation claims brought by the State, industry challenges to Anvisa regulations, and lawsuits for damages filed by consumers and the Public Prosecutor's Office.

On May 21, 2019, the Attorney General of the Union filed a lawsuit in the Federal Court of Rio Grande do Sul requesting that manufacturers reimburse the SUS (Brazilian Public Health System) for expenses related to illnesses attributable to smoking. The industry also filed several lawsuits challenging Anvisa's regulatory acts, notably RDC No. 14/2012, which restricted additives and established technical parameters for tobacco derivatives. A direct action of unconstitutionality (ADI 4874) prompted a preliminary injunction granted by minister Rosa Weber in 2013 and was the subject of a judgment in the Supreme Federal Court, which ruled the action inadmissible.

Retail sale of e-cigarettes and e-cigarette refills is prohibited. Tobacco products are not prohibited.

=== Canada ===
Canada proposed a plan for their three biggest tobacco companies to pay out $32.5 billion to Canadian provinces, territories, and smokers. As of October 2024, this plan has not been approved yet. If approved, the deal would see the three firms — Imperial Tobacco Canada Ltd., JTI-Macdonald Corp. and Rothmans, Benson & Hedges — pay: $24.7 billion to the provinces and territories; $6.6 billion to individuals who experienced defined smoking-related diseases or their survivors; and $1 billion to a new national foundation for research into cancer and other smoking-related diseases.

=== China ===
Although China faces many tobacco-related health problems, with over 1.2 million tobacco-related deaths per year, the government has had a limited response. The tobacco industry provides 7 to 10 percent of tax revenue for the government, while also providing many jobs in agriculture, sales, and other businesses. In addition, the government considers anti-smoking measures as potentially destabilizing, given the resentment and unrest it could cause.

The tobacco industry and some bureaucratic institutions oppose anti-smoking measures. In China, the tobacco industry is heavily monopolized. The largest firm is China National Tobacco Corporation (CNTC), which is also the world's largest tobacco firm and makes up about 32 percent of the global market. The CNTC is described as a “de facto industrial and business agency” as it is also run by the national regulatory agency, the State Tobacco Monopoly Administration (STMA). Some have criticized the STMA/CNTC for the overlap between government and business (zhengqi bu fen).

Some regional governments also oppose tobacco control policies. For example, in Yunnan Province, tobacco is the largest industry, with tobacco taxes supplying one half of its local government revenue. Other provinces like Guizhou, Henan, and Sichuan, also rely heavily on revenue from tobacco production.

The Chinese government has implemented some tobacco control measures. Through the 1980s and 1990s, the national government and local governments implemented various bans on smoking in public places. In 2005, the PRC ratified the Framework Convention on Tobacco Control (FCTC). In 2009, the government raised the tobacco consumption tax, although this did not reduce smoking, as the government required wholesale and retail prices to remain the same. In 2011, the National People's Congress (NPC) passed the 12th Five-Year Plan, which included a call to completely ban smoking in public places. However, many of these laws have been weakly enforced.

=== India ===
Regular cigarettes and other tobacco products are not prohibited. E-cigarettes are prohibited. However, smoking is completely banned in many public places and workplaces such as healthcare, educational, and government facilities, and on public transport. However, public health advocates have been pushing for stricter regulations to curb tobacco use, citing the economic burden of tobacco-related diseases on the healthcare system. India is a signatory to the World Health Organization Framework Convention on Tobacco Control (WHO FCTC), which mandates strong anti-tobacco measures, including bans on advertising, higher taxes, and warning labels.

=== Japan ===
After the Meiji Restoration in the nineteenth century, Japan began taxing tobacco. Historically, tobacco revenue has been used to fund military endeavors. In the late nineteenth century, following the deficits from the Sino-Japanese War and in preparation for the Russo-Japanese War, the government imposed a monopoly over tobacco production. In 1985, this monopoly was privatized into what is now Japan Tobacco (JT), although the government still exhibits great influence over and benefits from tobacco tax revenue. In 1999, Japan Tobacco created its international branch, Japan Tobacco International (JTI). JTI is now the world's third largest transnational tobacco corporation (TTC).

In 2014, the Tokyo High Court ruled that there was no definitive scientific evidence that passive smoking causes cancer, although the evidence they were presented was discredited outside of Japan.

In 2017, in preparation for the 2020 Summer Olympic and Paralympic Games hosted in Tokyo, the Health, Labor and Welfare Ministry called to ban smoking in public facilities. Japan has some of the least stringent tobacco control measures in the world. The food service industry, which includes public premises like restaurants and bars, strongly opposed this measure. In 2018, the plan for a total smoking ban was revised to include certain exceptions, such as separate rooms for smokers in restaurants, in exempting "small-scale" establishments.

Nicotine-containing e-cigarettes are only permitted as medicinal products, and no e-cigarettes have been approved. Regular cigarettes and other tobacco products are not prohibited.

=== Netherlands ===
The Lidl supermarket chain in the Netherlands stopped selling cigarettes in 2021.

=== Portugal ===
Law No. 37/2007 established the legal basis for advertising bans, labeling rules, and measures to protect against exposure to smoke. The Directorate-General of Health coordinates the National Program for the Prevention and Control of Tobacco Use and publishes technical guidelines that support regulatory actions and cessation policies.

In 2017, the Supreme Court of Justice ruled that the Competition Authority should launch an investigation to look into allegations of abuse of dominant position by Tabaqueira, raised by wholesalers. Wholesalers (represented by industry associations) challenged decisions by the Competition Authority that authorized concentration operations in the tobacco market — the administrative court annulled at least one of these authorizations, forcing the repetition of acts or allowing the parties to seek judicial redress.

News reports from 2025 indicate that Tabaqueira may be ordered to pay millions of euros to shopkeepers, following the recognition, in higher court rulings, of practices that may constitute abuse of dominant position; this legal process includes requests for the standardization of jurisprudence and potential lawsuits for damages.

=== Russia ===
In Russia, smoking is very prevalent, with tobacco industries wielding great influence in Russian politics. Several Russian Duma members have also worked within the tobacco industry. After a protest caused by cigarette shortages in 1990, transnational tobacco companies began to invest in the Russian tobacco market, particularly in production. This growth in industry has been accompanied by an increase in smoking, and Russia has the highest rates of smoking in Europe.

Although the Russian government has attempted to implement tobacco prevention and control programs, most of these have had limited success. In the mid-1990s, the Federal Ministry of Health recommended several tobacco control measures, but failed to provide funding for their enactment. In 1999, the Duma introduced national tobacco control legislation. However, this legislation was substantially watered down after measures like limitations on advertisement were removed. In 2006, the Duma passed limited tobacco advertising regulations, which still allowed for small warnings on cigarette packs without graphics. In 2010, Prime Minister Putin approved the "Concept of the Government Policy on Combating Tobacco Use for 2010–2015". Although the concept set forth several goals and concrete policy suggestions, such as complete bans on all tobacco advertising, it was not legally binding. When the Ministry of Health and Social Development (MoHSD) proposed tobacco legislation based on the concept, the bill was suspended within two days. Although many Russian representatives helped develop the Framework Convention on Tobacco Control (FCTC), Russia was one of the last countries to sign the FCTC.

In 2017, the Ministry of Health proposed a cigarette ban that would apply to all born after 2014, although some have expressed concern that a ban would result in a cigarette black market.

=== Seychelles ===
While tobacco products are not prohibited, there are some restrictions that exist on the manufacture, importation, and sale of tobacco products, including packaging and labeling requirements. The use of e-cigarettes has also been legal since 2019.

=== Singapore ===
While tobacco products are not prohibited, some restrictions exist on the sale of tobacco products, and E-cigarettes are prohibited.

=== Slovenia ===
The ranking of Slovenia in the Tobacco Control Scale moved from the 28th position in 2016 to the 8th in 2019. It is one of the 13 EU member states that in 2012 approved a smoking ban in private cars in the presence of minors. The remaining countries are: Ireland, UK, France, Finland, Italy, Malta, Cyprus, Lithuania, Slovenia, Luxembourg, Austria, Greece and Belgium. In 2020, Slovenia launched a program with the purpose to become a tobacco-free society by 2040, as the last useful date.

=== South Africa ===
Smoking in public is banned. This includes pubs, bars, walkways, and parking spaces, and smoking on public transport and domestic flights. The use of tobacco is also banned in any car carrying a person under the age of 12.

=== Switzerland ===
In 2018, following an appeal by an association of vapers, the Federal Administrative Court authorised the sale of nicotine-containing electronic cigarettes.

In 2019, following an appeal by a company importing snus, the Federal Supreme Court authorised its sale, due to a lack of sufficient legal basis for a ban.

=== UK ===
Cigarette television advertisements were banned in 1965.

As of 2012, in England, cigarette and tobacco displays in supermarkets were banned. As such, though sales in supermarkets are not yet entirely banned, they must at least stay hidden in closed cupboards, out of sight.

England met its target to reduce its adult smoking prevalence to 21% or lower by 2010.

The majority of tobacco advertisements were outlawed under British jurisdiction after the Tobacco Advertising and Promotion Act 2002 was implemented.

=== Ukraine ===
While tobacco products remain legal in Ukraine, recent legislative reforms introduced additional licensing and compliance requirements for farmers cultivating tobacco (as outlined in Law of Ukraine No. 481/95-VR). These measures aim to maintain quality standards and reduce illicit trade, reflecting the government’s broader strategy to address the health impacts of tobacco consumption.

=== Uruguay ===
The law prohibits the sale of tobacco products via vending machines, the internet, educational facilities and various other places. E-cigarettes are also prohibited.

== See also ==
- Cigarette filter
- Container-deposit legislation
- Merchants of Doubt – 2010 book
- Merchants of Doubt – 2014 film based on the book
- Nicotine marketing
  - Electronic cigarette and e-cigarette liquid marketing
  - Regulation of nicotine marketing
- Tobacco control
  - Tobacco Master Settlement Agreement
  - WHO Framework Convention on Tobacco Control
- Tobacco industry
  - A Frank Statement
  - Operation Berkshire
