= Comprehensive Smoking Education Act =

US law

- Other short titles: Rotational Warning Act
- Long title: An Act to establish a national program to increase the availability of information on the health consequences of smoking, to amend the Federal Cigarette Labeling and Advertising Act to change the label requirements for cigarettes, and for other purposes.
- Acronyms (colloquial): CSEA
- Nicknames: Comprehensive Smoking Education Act of 1984
- Enacted by: the 98th United States Congress
- Effective: October 12, 1984

Citations
- Public law: 98-474
- Statutes at Large: 98 Stat. 2200

Codification
- Acts amended: Cigarette Labeling and Advertising Act; Public Health Cigarette Smoking Act
- Titles amended: 15 U.S.C.: Commerce and Trade
- U.S.C. sections amended: 15 U.S.C. ch. 36 § 1331 et seq.

Legislative history
- Introduced in the House as H.R. 3979 by Henry Waxman (D–CA) on September 22, 1983; Committee consideration by House Energy and Commerce; Passed the House on September 10, 1984 (passed voice vote); Passed the Senate on September 26, 1984 (passed voice vote) with amendment; House agreed to Senate amendment on September 26, 1984 (agreed unanimous consent); Signed into law by President Ronald Reagan on October 12, 1984

The Comprehensive Smoking Education Act of 1984 (also known as the Rotational Warning Act) is an act of the Congress of the United States. A national program established in order to improve the availability of information on health risks related to tobacco smoking, to amend the Federal Cigarette Labeling and Advertising Act so that cigarette warning labels would be different, and for other reasons, the Comprehensive Smoking Education Act was enacted with a purpose to, as stated in Section 1 of the Act, "provide a new strategy for making Americans more aware of any adverse health effects of smoking, to assure the timely and widespread dissemination of research findings and to enable individuals to make informed decisions about smoking". Adopted by Congress in 1984 and effective October 12, 1984, the Comprehensive Smoking Education Act created a rotational warning system that required all cigarette packages and advertisements to rotate the following four warnings every three months:

SURGEON GENERAL'S WARNING: Smoking Causes Lung Cancer, Heart Disease, Emphysema, and May Complicate Pregnancy.
SURGEON GENERAL'S WARNING: Smoking by Pregnant Women May Result in Fetal Injury, Premature Birth, and Low Birth Weight.
SURGEON GENERAL'S WARNING: Cigarette Smoke Contains Carbon Monoxide.
SURGEON GENERAL'S WARNING: Quitting Smoking Now Greatly Reduces Serious Risks to Your Health.

== Background ==
Researchers and statisticians began to suspect a link between smoking and lung cancer as early as 1900. The first medical studies linking smoking to this and other illnesses began to appear in the 1920s. Between 1920 and 1960 over 7,000 studies established a link between smoking and health problems. In 1962, with this ever-expanding body of medical research as a backdrop, Dr. Luther L. Terry, the Surgeon General of the U.S. Public Health Service, convened an advisory committee to examine the issue of the link between smoking and illness. Though there were a few restrictions during the 17th century, significant anti-smoking legislation was not enforced until later in the 19th century. According to the first Surgeon General's Report on Smoking and Health published in 1964, the Surgeon General reported not only that the nicotine and tar in cigarettes caused lung cancer, but also that smoking was the most important cause of chronic bronchitis, increased risk of dying from chronic bronchitis and emphysema, and caused coronary disease. As a result, Congress enacted the Cigarette Labeling and Advertising Act in 1965, which created the first cigarette warning label in the United States by requiring health warnings on all cigarette packages saying "Caution: Cigarette Smoking May Be Hazardous to Your Health." A few years later, Congress passed the Public Health Cigarette Smoking Act of 1969, which banned cigarette advertising on television and radio as well as slightly changed the health warning to "Warning: The Surgeon General Has Determined That Cigarette Smoking is Dangerous to Your Health." However, in a 1981 report to Congress, the Federal Trade Commission concluded that the health warning labels were not effective enough on public knowledge and peoples' attitudes towards smoking. This led to the Comprehensive Smoking Education Act of 1984.

== Provisions of law ==
As shown in Sections 3, 4, and 7 of the Comprehensive Smoking Education Act, the Act addresses and affects smoking research, education, and information, cigarette labels, and the ingredients added to tobacco in cigarettes.

Section 3 of the Comprehensive Smoking Education Act covers the subject of smoking research, education, and information, stating that the Secretary of Health and Human Services must establish and carry out a program that will inform the public of any human health risks caused by cigarette smoking. In order to do so, the Secretary must perform tasks such as conducting and supporting research on human health risks from cigarette smoking, informing the public of the effects of smoking, coordinating anything related to the effects of cigarette smoking on human health within the Department of Health and Human Services, serving as a liaison with agencies in regards to activities related to health risks from smoking, developing improved information programs related to smoking and health, compiling and disseminating information on legislation related to cigarette use, and undertaking any other additional information or action that may seem appropriate in furthering the program. There is an Interagency Committee on Smoking and Health, composed of members appointed by the Secretary, that helps the Secretary fulfill some of the responsibilities, and the Secretary must publish a biennial report to Congress.

Section 4 of the Comprehensive Smoking Education Act discusses cigarette warning labels, stating that any person manufacturing, packing, or importing the sale or distribution of cigarette packages within the United States must have one of the four labels mentioned above. Any manufacturer or importer of cigarettes advertising cigarettes in the United States through the use of any medium besides outdoor billboards must also make sure that the advertisement contains one of the four previously listed labels, and those advertising cigarettes in the United States through the use of outdoor billboards must have one of the following labels on the advertisement:

SURGEON GENERAL'S WARNING: Smoking Causes Lung Cancer, Heart Disease, And Emphysema.
SURGEON GENERAL'S WARNING: Quitting Smoking Now Greatly Reduces Serious Health Risks.
SURGEON GENERAL'S WARNING: Pregnant Women Who Smoke Risk Fetal Injury and Premature Birth.
SURGEON GENERAL'S WARNING: Cigarette Smoke Contains Carbon Monoxide.

Section 4 continues to elaborate on the visual requirements of the warning labels, listing the regulations on the size, wording, and implementation of the warning labels. For example, Section 4(b)(1) states "The phrase "Surgeon General's Warning' shall appear in capital letters and the size of all other letters in the label shall be the same as the size of such letters as of such date of enactment. All the letters in the label shall appear in conspicuous and legible type in contrast by typography, layout, or color with all tore printed material on the package."

In addition, as stated in Section 7 of the Comprehensive Smoking Education Act, the cigarette industry must provide the Secretary an annual list of the ingredients added to cigarettes manufactured in, packaged in, or imported into the United States. The list is confidential, and with the help of an authorized agent who serves as a custodian of such information, it is the Secretary's responsibility make sure such information remains confidential.
