= Smoking and Health =

1964 US government report on the health effects of smoking

Cover of the 1964 Smoking and Health report.

Smoking and Health: Report of the Advisory Committee to the Surgeon General of the Public Health Service is a landmark report on the negative health effects of tobacco smoking, published on January 11, 1964, by the U.S. Surgeon General's Advisory Committee on Smoking and Health.

Analyzing more than 7,000 scientific articles and papers, the report finds that smoking is linked to chronic bronchitis, emphysema, heart disease, and lung cancer. The release of the report was one of the top news stories of 1964, leading to policies that aimed to discourage smoking, such as the Cigarette Labeling and Advertising Act of 1965 and the Public Health Cigarette Smoking Act of 1969.

== Background ==
The health effects of tobacco had been debated among recreational users, medical experts, and governments alike since its introduction to European culture. Hard evidence for the ill effects of smoking became apparent with the results of several long-term studies conducted in the first half of the 20th century, such as the epidemiology studies of Richard Doll and pathology studies of Oscar Auerbach. On June 12, 1957, Surgeon General Leroy Burney "declared it the official position of the U.S. Public Health Service that the evidence pointed to a causal relationship between smoking and lung cancer". A committee of the United Kingdom's Royal College of Physicians issued a report on March 7, 1962, which "clearly indicted cigarette smoking as a cause of lung cancer and bronchitis" and argued that "it probably contributed to cardiovascular disease as well."

Despite that, there was little interest in the U.S. government and Congress in studying any connection between health and tobacco smoking because of the need to satisfy the interests of the tobacco industry and tobacco-growing states. After pressure from the American Cancer Society, the American Heart Association, the National Tuberculosis Association, and the American Public Health Association, President John F. Kennedy authorized the creation of an advisory committee that met from November 1962 to January 1964.

=== Forming the committee ===
The Surgeon General's Advisory Committee on Smoking and Health consisted of 10 members, chaired by Luther Terry, Surgeon General of the United States. Although the members were experts in their medical or scientific fields, none specialized in smoking and health, as non-expertise was required in attempt to remove any investigators' bias. Dr. Herman Kraybill of the National Cancer Institute was also appointed as the committee's executive director, but lawyers for the tobacco industry forced him to resign after he told a journalist that he believed evidence "definitely suggests" that smoking was a danger to health; members were selected among those who did not hold a public position on whether smoking harms health. The role of executive director was left unfilled after Kraybill's departure.

- Stanhope Bayne-Jones, M.D., LL.D. (Retired).
  - Former Dean, Yale School of Medicine (1935–40). Former President, Joint Administrative Board, Cornell University. New York Hospital Medical Center (1947–52): Former president, Society of American Bacteriologists (1929). Former president, American Society of Pathology and Bacteriology (1940).
  - Field: Nature and Causation of Disease in Human Populations.
- Walter J. Burdette, M.D., Ph. D.
  - Head of Department of Surgery, University of Utah School of Medicine, Salt Lake City.
  - Fields: Clinical and Experimental Surgery; Genetics.
- William G. Cochran, M.A.
  - Professor of Statistics. Harvard University.
  - Field: Mathematical Statistics with: Special Application to Biological Problems.
- Emmanuel Farber, M.D., Ph. D.
  - Chairman. Department of Pathology. University of Pittsburgh.
  - Field: Experimental and Clinical Pathology.
- Louis F. Fieser, Ph. D.
  - Sheldon Emory. Professor of Organic Chemistry. Harvard University.
  - Field: Chemistry of Carcinogenic Hydrocarbons.
- Jacob Furth, M.D.
  - Professor of Pathology. Columbia University. Director of Pathology Laboratories, Francis Delafield Hospital, New York.
  - Field: Cancer Biology.
- John B. Hickam, M.D.
  - Chairman, Department of Internal Medicine, Indiana University, Indianapolis.
  - Fields: Internal Medicine. Physiology of Cardiopulmonary Disease.
- Charles LeMaistre, M.D.
  - Professor of Internal Medicine, University of Texas Southwestern Medical School. Medical Director, Woodland Hospital, Dallas, Texas.
  - Fields: Internal Medicine. Pulmonary Diseases, Preventative Medicine.
- Leonard M. Schuman, M.D.
  - Professor of Epidemiology. University of Minnesota School of Public Health, Minneapolis.
  - Field: Health and its relationship to the Total Environment.
- Maurice H. Seevers, M.D., Ph. D.
  - Chairman, Department of Pharmacology, University of Michigan, Ann Arbor.
  - Field: Pharmacology of Anesthesia and Habit-Forming Drugs.

== Findings ==
The report concludes that cigarette smoking damages health. It finds that cigarette smoke is the primary cause of chronic bronchitis, and smokers had a 70% increase in age-corrected mortality rate. Smoking is also correlated with emphysema and heart disease, and increases the chance of developing lung cancer by 10 to 20 times. Pregnant women who smoke are also more likely to give birth to underweight newborns.

As did the World Health Organization during this period, but possibly influenced by the fact that they were all smokers themselves, the Committee defined cigarette smoking as a "habituation" rather than an overpowering "addiction". Committee members agreed that for most Americans, the smoking habit was often strong but still possible to break.

== Response ==
The report's publication had wide-ranging reaction across the United States. It was deliberately published on a Saturday to minimize the negative effect on the American stock markets, while maximizing the coverage in Sunday newspapers. The release of the report was one of the top news stories of 1964. It led to policy and public opinion changes such as the Federal Cigarette Labeling and Advertising Act of 1965 and the Public Health Cigarette Smoking Act of 1969, which mandated warning labels on cigarettes and instituted a ban on the broadcasting of cigarette advertisements on radio and/or television.

In the years that followed the report, millions of Americans chose to quit smoking, with two-thirds to three-quarters of ex-smokers quitting unaided by nicotine replacement methods. In addition, the "cold turkey" (or sudden-and-rapid-cessation) method has been found to be the most successful in terms of stopping smoking over long periods of time. In 1989, a later Surgeon General, C. Everett Koop, called cigarette smoking "an addiction" rather than a habit.

== See also ==
- Tobacco in the United States
- List of tobacco-related topics
