= Stanhope Bayne-Jones =

American physician

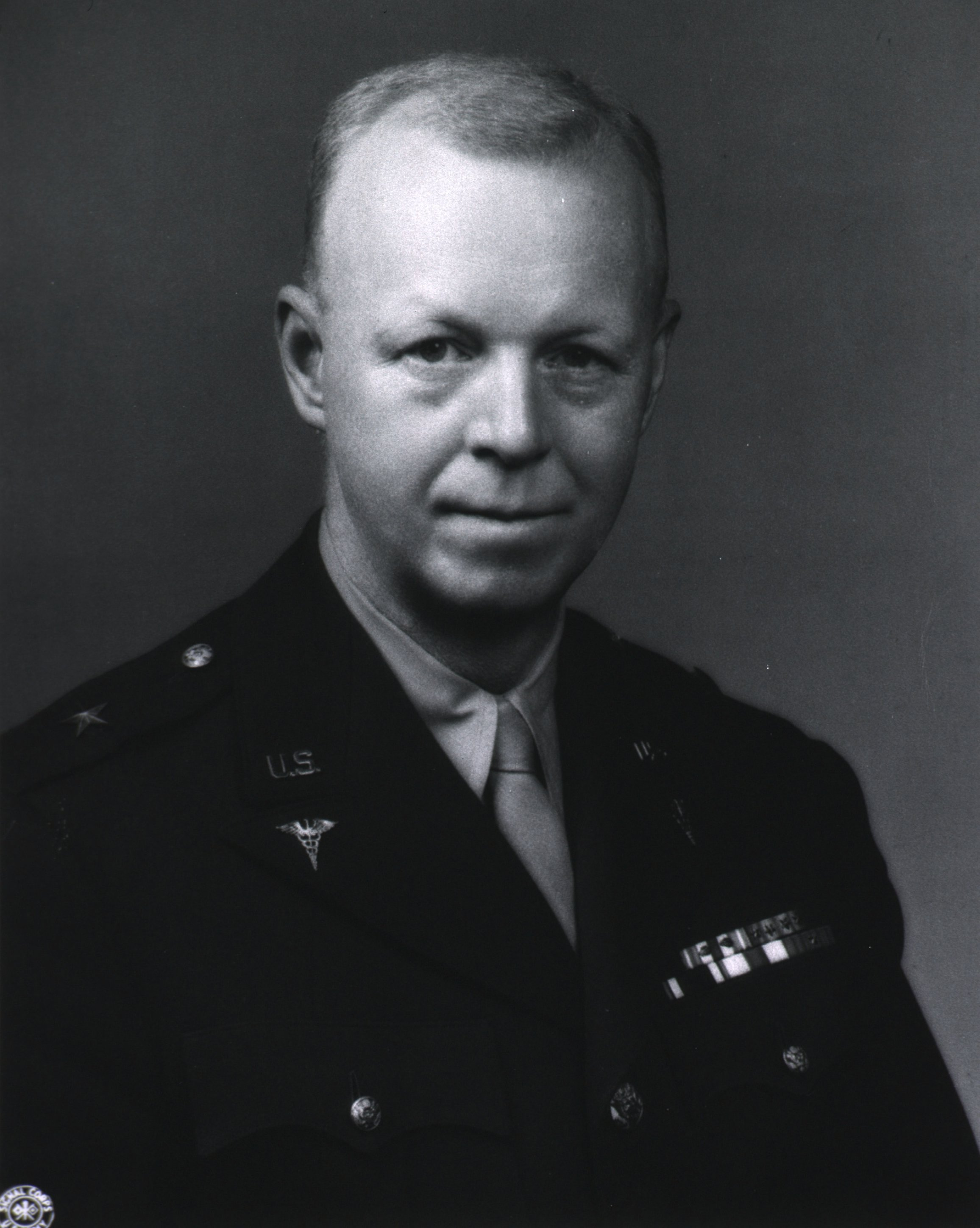
- Born: November 6, 1888; New Orleans, Louisiana, U.S.
- Died: February 20, 1970 (aged 81); Washington, D.C., U.S.
- Military career
- Allegiance: United States of America
- Branch: United States Army
- Service years: 1915 - 1919, 1942 - 1946
- Rank: Brigadier General
- Service number: 0-170753
- Conflicts: World War I: Battle of Château-Thierry; Aisne-Marne Offensive; Battle of Saint-Mihiel; Meuse-Argonne Offensive; World War II
- Awards: Distinguished Service Medal; Silver Star (3)

Stanhope Bayne-Jones (November 6, 1888 – February 20, 1970) was an American physician, bacteriologist, medical historian and a United States Army medical officer with the rank of brigadier general.

== Early life and education ==
Bayne-Jones was born on November 6, 1888, in New Orleans as the son of physician. His grandfather Joseph Jones was also a physician and served in the medical department of the Confederate States Army during the American Civil War. In this way, Bayne-Jones was influenced in his future career choice.

Bayne-Jones attended Dixon Academy in Covington, Louisiana and then enrolled the Yale University, where he graduated in 1910 with A.B. degree. He then entered Johns Hopkins School of Medicine in Baltimore, where he received his Doctor of Medicine degree in 1914.

== Career ==
He became a teacher and also a researcher in the fields of bacteriology and immunology. Bayne-Jones received a commission of First Lieutenant in the Medical Reserve Corps, U.S. Army on August 7, 1915.

Bayne-Jones was elected to the American Philosophical Society in 1944.

As a member of the United States Surgeon General's Advisory Committee on Smoking and Health, he had a significant role in the 1964 report linking smoking to cancer.

Bayne-Jones was the subject of a biography in 1992.

Bayne-Jones Community Hospital at the US Army's Fort Polk is named in his honor, as is a professorship at Johns Hopkins University School of Medicine.

His papers were donated to the United States National Library of Medicine in the late 1960s.

Bayne-Jones was the first master at Yale University's Trumbull College from 1932 to 1938.

== Decorations ==
Shown below is the ribbon bar of Bayne-Jones as a Brigadier general:

| 1st Row | Army Distinguished Service Medal | | | |
| 2nd Row | Silver Star with two Oak Leaf Clusters | World War I Victory Medal with four Battle Clasps | Army of Occupation of Germany Medal | American Campaign Medal |
| 3rd Row | World War II Victory Medal | Honorary Commander of the Order of the British Empire (United Kingdom) | Military Cross (United Kingdom) | French Croix de Guerre 1914–1918 with Gilt star |
