= Oscar Auerbach =

American pathologist (1905–1997)

- Born: January 1, 1905; New York City, U.S.
- Died: January 15, 1997 January 15, 1997 (aged 92); New Jersey, U.S.
- Scientific career
- Fields: Pathology, Oncology
- Workplaces: Sea View Hospital, Veterans Administration, New Jersey Medical School

Oscar Auerbach (January 1, 1905 – January 15, 1997) was an American pathologist and medical educator who significantly helped tie cigarette smoking to cancer.

== Early life and education ==
Auerbach was born in Manhattan, New York City. He was the first child of European Jewish immigrants, Max and Jennie Auerbach. He attended Staten Island Academy but never completed high school or college. He entered New York University based on exams, then left without a degree to enter New York Medical College, receiving his MD in 1929. He later studied pathology in Vienna, where he met his wife.

== Career ==
Auerbach worked at Staten Island's Sea View Hospital and Halloran Hospital in the 1930s and 1940s. He also served two years in the U.S. Navy during World War II. Beginning in 1952, he worked at the Veterans Administration Hospital in East Orange, New Jersey, holding the title senior medical investigator at his death. He was on the faculty of New York Medical College from 1949 to 1971 and was appointed a professor of pathology at New Jersey Medical School in 1960.

Auerbach studied the link between smoking and cancer, and was called a "tireless" researcher. His studies were cited prominently in the 1964 Surgeon General's report on smoking, taking the evidence against smoking beyond statistical studies. From the 1960s to the early 1970s, Auerbach and his lab worked with E. Cuyler Hammond to demonstrate that beagle dogs that smoked cigarettes in a laboratory environment developed lung cancer. Their findings, announced at a press conference at the Waldorf Astoria in February 1970, became the subject of significant debate and public controversy.

A resident of the Short Hills section of Millburn, New Jersey, Auerbach died at the age of 92 on January 15, 1997, at St. Barnabas Medical Center in Livingston, New Jersey.

== See also ==
- Health effects of tobacco smoking
