= Emmanuel Farber =

Canadian-American physician (1918–2014)

Emmanuel Farber (October 19, 1918, Toronto, Canada – August 3, 2014, Columbia, South Carolina) was a Canadian-American physician, pathologist, biochemist, and oncologist. He is known for his research on the biochemistry of carcinogenesis.

== Biography ==
His parents emigrated from Russia to Canada and the United States. His sister Sophie became a concert pianist and his brother Lionel earned a Ph.D. at the University of Toronto and became a professor of biochemistry at the University of California, San Francisco. Emmanuel Farber graduated in 1942 with an M.D. from the University of Toronto Faculty of Medicine. In April 1942 he married Ruth Wilma Diamond. From 1942 to 1946 he served as a captain in the Royal Canadian Army Medical Corps. From 1942 to 1943 he did his medical internship and medical residency in pathology at Hamilton General Hospital. Supported from 1947 to 1949 by a fellowship in cancer research from the American Cancer Society, he became a graduate student in biochemistry at the University of California, Berkeley, where he graduated with a Ph.D. in biochemistry in 1949. In 1948 he learned about hepatology, pathology, and oncology under the supervision of Hans Popper at Cook County Hospital. From 1950 to 1961 Farber a faculty member at Tulane University, starting as an instructor and resigning as an associate professor. Emmanuel and Ruth's daughter, Naomi Beth, was born in 1956. From 1961 to 1970 at the University of Pittsburgh School of Medicine, he was a professor of pathology and chair of the department of pathology and also a professor in the department of biochemistry. From 1970 to 1975 he was the director of the Fels Research Institute (now called the Fels Cancer Institute for Personalized Medicine) and a professor of pathology and biochemistry at the Temple University School of Medicine. From 1975 to 1985 he was a professor of pathology and chair of the department of pathology at the University of Toronto Faculty of Medicine, as well as a professor in the University of Toronto's department of biochemistry. In 1985 he retired as professor emeritus, but continued working in Toronto until his wife Ruth died in 1993.

Farber served on the editorial boards of several journals, including The American Journal of Pathology, Laboratory Investigation; The Journal of Histochemistry and Cytochemistry; Teratogenesis, Carcinogenesis, and Mutagenesis; The International Journal of Cancer; Hepatology; and Chemico-Biological Interactions. From 1961 to 1964 he served on the Surgeon General's Advisory Committee on Smoking and Health. The committee's 1964 report was of enormous importance in preventing disease related to tobacco smoking and environmental tobacco smoke.

Farber's research demonstrated that carcinogens can bind to DNA, causing specific DNA adducts that promote cancer. He and his colleagues showed that cancer can be induced in the livers of laboratory animals by a step-by-step series of chemical treatments. He was the author or coauthor of over 400 scientific publications.

He was elected in 1955 a fellow of the American Association for the Advancement of Science. He was elected in 1980 a fellow of the Royal Society of Canada and in 2013 an inaugural fellow of the Academy of the American Association for Cancer Research (AACR). He served as the AACR's president from 1972 to 1973. In 1973 he was also the president of the American Society for Experimental Pathology (which is now part of the American Society for Investigative Pathology). He gave in 1982 the Rous-Whipple Award Lecture and in 1984 the G.H.A. Clowes Memorial Lecture. In 1995 he shared the ASIP Gold-Headed Cane Award with Paul Eston Lacy.

In May 2000 Farber married Henrietta Schleider née Keller (1915–2011). Upon his death in 2014 he was survived by his daughter. He is buried in the Hebrew Benevolent Society Cemetery in Columbia, South Carolina. His daughter Naomi married Steven E. Grosby (a professor of religion) and became a professor of social work at the University of South Carolina.

== Selected publications ==
- Farber, Emmanuel (1963). Ethionine Carcinogenesis. Advances in Cancer Research. Vol. 7. pp. 383–474. doi:10.1016/S0065-230X(08)60986-0. ISBN 9780120066070. PMID 14153769.
- Farber, Emmanuel (1976). "The Pathology of Experimental Liver Cell Cancer". Liver Cell Cancer. pp. 243–277. doi:10.1016/B978-0-444-41542-4.50014-6. ISBN 9780444415424.
- Farber, Emmanuel; Cameron, Ross (1980). The Sequential Analysis of Cancer Development. Advances in Cancer Research. Vol. 31. pp. 125–226. doi:10.1016/S0065-230X(08)60658-2. ISBN 9780120066315. PMID 6250325.
- Tsuda, H.; Lee, G.; Farber, E. (1980). "Induction of resistant hepatocytes as a new principle for a possible short-term in vivo test for carcinogens". Cancer Research. 40 (4): 1157–1164. PMID 6101993.
- Farber, Emmanuel (1980). "The sequential analysis of liver cancer induction". Biochimica et Biophysica Acta (BBA) - Reviews on Cancer. 605 (2): 149–166. doi:10.1016/0304-419X(80)90002-5. PMID 6994812.
- Solt, D. B.; Cayama, E.; Tsuda, H.; Enomoto, K.; Lee, G.; Farber, E. (1983). "Promotion of liver cancer development by brief exposure to dietary 2-acetylaminofluorene plus partial hepatectomy or carbon tetrachloride". Cancer Research. 43 (1): 188–191. PMID 6291753.
- Ghoshal, Amiya K.; Farber, Emmanuel (1984). "The induction of liver cancer by dietary deficiency of choline and methionine without added carcinogens". Carcinogenesis. 5 (10): 1367–1370. doi:10.1093/carcin/5.10.1367. PMID 6488458.
- Farber, Emmanuel (1988). "Cancer development and its natural history a cancer prevention perspective". Cancer. 62 (S1): 1676–1679. doi:10.1002/1097-0142(19881015)62:1+<1676::AID-CNCR2820621303>3.0.CO;2-1. PMID 3167785. S2CID 35730301. 1988
- Gelderblom, W.C.A.; Semple, E.; Marasas, W.F.O.; Farber, E. (1992). "The cancer-initiating potential of the fumonisin B mycotoxins". Carcinogenesis. 13 (3): 433–437. doi:10.1093/carcin/13.3.433. PMID 1547534.
- Ghoshal, A. K.; Farber, E. (1993). "Choline deficiency, lipotrope deficiency and the development of liver disease including liver cancer: A new perspective". Laboratory Investigation; A Journal of Technical Methods and Pathology. 68 (3): 255–260. PMID 7680728.

== Books ==
- Faber, E.; Fisher, Murray M., eds. (1980). Toxic Injury of the Liver (Part A). Liver: Normal Function and Disease Ser., Vol. 2. Marcel Dekker. ISBN 0824768388.
- Faber, E.; Fisher, Murray M., eds. (1980). Toxic Injury of the Liver (Part B). Liver: Normal Function and Disease Ser., Vol. 2. Marcel Dekker. ISBN 0824768396.
