= E. Cuyler Hammond =

American biologist and epidemiologist

- Born: June 12, 1912; Baltimore, Maryland, U.S.
- Died: November 3, 1986 (aged 74)
- Education: Yale University; Johns Hopkins University
- Known for: Link between smoking and cancer
- Awards: Hodgkins Medal

E. Cuyler Hammond (June 14, 1912 – November 3, 1986) was an American biologist and epidemiologist who was one of the first researchers to establish a link between smoking and lung cancer.

== Biography ==
Hammond was a native of Baltimore, Maryland and educated at the Gilman Country Day School. He studied biology at Yale (B.S. 1935) and earned a D.Sc. in biology from Johns Hopkins (1938).

From 1938 to 1942, he worked as a statistician in the Division of Industrial Hygiene at the National Institute of Health, and in 1941 and 1942 he was a consultant for medical research to the Navy. He then served in what became the Air Force from 1942 to 1946, rising to the rank of major.

From 1946 to 1966, he was director of the statistical research section of the American Cancer Society, becoming vice president for epidemiology and statistics until 1977. From 1953 to 1958 he was also a professor of biometry at Yale.

In 1952, Hammond published an early report linking cigarette smoking and lung cancer. Two years later he published the initial findings of a study of 180,000 men which confirmed the high risk of death from all causes as a result of smoking cigarettes. Later research demonstrated a link between smoking cigarettes and cancers other than lung cancer. The research also showed a decreased risk of cancer after people stopped smoking and a relationship between cigarette smoking and cancer in women. To develop on his 1952 conclusions, he helped to establish in 1959 a force of more than 60,000 volunteers who worked for the American Cancer Society to gather data on the smoking habits of more than 1 million Americans. He also published, in collaboration with Dr. Oscar Auerbach, a series of studies of the cellular changes caused by smoking. Other studies in the 1960s and 1970s demonstrated the carcinogenic effects of asbestos and vinyl chloride.

In 1976, he was awarded the prestigious Hodgkins Medal of the Smithsonian Institution for his contributions to the wellbeing of mankind.

He died in 1986. He had married twice: firstly Marian E. Thomas, with whom he had three sons, and secondly Katharine S. Redmond.

== See also ==
- Health effects of tobacco
- Richard Doll
