= Altria Group, Inc. v. Good =

Altria Group v. Good
- Supreme Court of the United States

Argued October 6, 2008 Decided December 15, 2008
- Full case name: Altria Group, Inc., et al. v. Stephanie Good, et al.
- Docket no.: 07-562
- Citations: 555 U.S. 70 (more) 129 S. Ct. 538; 172 L. Ed. 2d 398

Case history
- Prior: Summary judgment for defendants, 436 F. Supp. 2d 132 (D. Me. 2006); reversed, 501 F.3d 29 (1st Cir. 2007); cert. granted, 552 U.S. 1162 (2008).

Holding
- Federal law does not preempt the application of state law prohibiting deceptive practices in advertising to the advertisement of tar and nicotine rates in cigarettes.

Court membership
- Chief Justice John Roberts Associate Justices John P. Stevens · Antonin Scalia; Anthony Kennedy · David Souter; Clarence Thomas · Ruth Bader Ginsburg; Stephen Breyer · Samuel Alito

Case opinions
- Majority: Stevens, joined by Kennedy, Souter, Ginsburg, Breyer
- Dissent: Thomas, joined by Roberts, Scalia, Alito

Laws applied
- 15 U.S.C. § 1334(b) (Federal Cigarette Labeling and Advertising Act); Me. Rev. Stat. Ann., Tit. 5, § 207(Supp. 2008) (Maine Unfair Trade Practices Act)

Altria Group v. Good, 555 U.S. 70 (2008), was a United States Supreme Court case holding that a Maine state law prohibiting deceptive tobacco advertising was not preempted by the 1965 Cigarette Labeling and Advertising Act regulating cigarette advertising.

== Background ==
The lawsuit claimed that American tobacco corporation Altria's marketing of "light" and "low tar" cigarettes constituted fraudulent misrepresentations under the Maine Unfair Trade Practices Act (MUTPA) (Note: Me. Rev. Stat. Ann., Tit. 5, §207 (Supp. 2008). The MUTPA provides in pertinent part that "unfair methods of competition and unfair or deceptive acts or practices in the conduct of any trade or commerce are declared unlawful." §207. In construing that section, courts are to "be guided by the interpretations given by the Federal Trade Commission and the Federal Courts to Section 45(a)(1) of the Federal Trade Commission Act (15 United States Code 45(a)(1)), as from time to time amended." §207(1).) because it deceived smokers into thinking the products were safer than regular cigarettes.

The United States District Court for the District of Maine granted summary judgment in favor of Altria, holding that the state law claim was preempted by the federal Cigarette Labeling and Advertising Act. The Court of Appeals for the First Circuit reversed, holding that the federal act had neither expressly nor impliedly preempted the respondents' fraud claim.

The Supreme Court was therefore asked to answer the following question whether federal preemption of MUTPA hinged on the express or implied nature of the allegedly fraudulent misrepresentations.

== Opinion of the Court ==
Justice John Paul Stevens, joined by Justices Anthony Kennedy, David Souter, Ruth Bader Ginsburg, and Stephen Breyer, wrote the majority opinion. He held that neither the Labeling Act's preemption provision, nor the Federal Trade Commission's actions in this field, expressly or impliedly preempt claims related to "smoking and health" under the Maine statute.

Adopting his plurality opinion's reasoning from Cipollone v. Liggett Group, Inc., Stevens found that claims based on a common law legal duty ("predicate-duty" approach, e.g., a manufacturer's duty not to misrepresent its products), were not preempted simply because they related to cigarette manufacturers and the labeling of its products. He held first that Congress could indicate intent to preempt via a statute either through express language or through structure and purpose. The Labeling Act's stated purposes were to inform the public of the health risks of smoking while protecting commerce and the economy from the effects of nonuniform requirements. Although fidelity to these purposes did not demand the preemption of state fraud rules, the principal question was whether that result was nevertheless required by the act, which provided that "no requirement or prohibition based on smoking and health shall be imposed under State law with respect to the advertising or promotion of any cigarettes the packages of which are labeled in conformity with the provisions of this chapter."

Stevens then held that the respondents' claim was not expressly preempted by the Labeling Act on the basis that as determined in Cipollone v. Liggett Group, Inc. (1992) and Lorillard Tobacco Co. v. Reilly (2001), the phrase "based on smoking and health" modified the state law rule at issue rather than a particular application of that rule. The Cipollone plurality had concluded that "the phrase 'based on smoking and health' fairly but narrowly construed" did not preempt the Cipollone plaintiff's common law claim that cigarette manufacturers had fraudulently misrepresented and concealed a material fact because the claim alleged a violation of a duty not to deceive, a duty not "based on" smoking and health. The Altria respondents also alleged a violation of the duty not to deceive as codified in the MUTPA, which also had nothing to do with smoking and health, so it was not preempted. He also disagreed with the petitioners' alternative argument that the express preemption framework of Cipollone and Reilly should be rejected and distinguished Riegel v. Medtronic, Inc. (2008).

Finally, Stevens held that various Federal Trade Commission decisions with respect to statements of tar and nicotine content do not impliedly preempt state deceptive practices rules like the MUTPA.

=== Dissent ===
Justice Clarence Thomas wrote a dissent joined by Chief Justice John Roberts as well as Justices Antonin Scalia and Samuel Alito. Thomas disagreed with the majority's adoption of the "predicate-duty" approach from Cipollone, arguing that it was confusing and unworkable. He argued that the court instead should have adopted a test expressly preempting any state law claim that "imposes an obligation...because of the effect of smoking upon health."
