= Joseph Kaplan =

Hungarian-American Physicist

Joseph Kaplan (September 8, 1902 – October 3, 1991) was a Hungarian-born American physicist.

Kaplan was notable for his studies of atmospheric phenomena and for his international activities in geophysics. He also participated in efforts to launch the first Earth satellite. He was a member of the National Academy of Sciences, a fellow of the Institute of Aeronautical Sciences, chairman of the U.S. National Committee for the International Geophysical Year, the founder and first director of the Institute of Geophysics at the University of California (later known as the Institute of Geophysics and Planetary Physics), an aerospace adviser to Presidents Dwight D. Eisenhower and Richard M. Nixon, a recipient of the Smithsonian Institution's Hodgkins Medal in 1967, the head of the United States Army Air Forces Air Weather Service during World War II, a professor and professor emeritus of physics at the University of California, Los Angeles, a fellow of American Geophysical Union, an honorary member of American Meteorological Society, a fellow of the American Physical Society, an honorary member of the National Association of Science Writers, and a founding member of the International Academy of Astronautics. He was president of the International Association of Geomagnetism and Aeronomy (IAGA) from 1957 to 1960 and president of the International Union of Geodesy and Geophysics (IUGG) from 1963 to 1967.

The Los Angeles Times said that Kaplan was "a pioneer in the chemistry and physics of the stratosphere". The Baltimore Sun called him "an expert on auroras and similar lights in the sky". In 1956, Kaplan warned of anthropogenic climate change: He was quoted in The New York Times saying that "during the next fifty years industrial burning of coal, oil and gas will produce 1,700 billion tons of new carbon dioxide. If all this carbon dioxide stays in the atmosphere, the slight general warming that has occurred in northern latitudes may be intensified."

== Notable awards and distinctions ==
- the John Adams Fleming Award of the American Geophysical Union (1970)
- the Commemorative Medal for the 50th Anniversary of the American Meteorological Society (1969)
- the Hodgkins Medal and Prize from the Smithsonian Institution
- the Astronautical Award from the American Rocket Society
- the War Department's Decoration for Exceptional Civilian Service (1947)
- the Air Force's Exceptional Civilian Service Award (1960 and 1969)
- the degree of doctor of science from Carleton College and the University of Notre Dame
- L.H.D. degrees from Yeshiva University, Hebrew Union College, Jewish Institute of Religion, and the University of Judaism

== Career and life ==
Kaplan was born in Tapolca, Hungary, into a Jewish family, in 1902. In 1910 at the age of eight he immigrated to the United States with his parents and 11 brothers and sisters. He graduated from Johns Hopkins University with a B.S. degree in chemistry and a M.S. and Ph.D. in physics. He spent his entire academic career at the University of California at Los Angeles (1928–1970). Kaplan died of a heart attack on October 3, 1991 in Santa Monica, California at the age of 89.
