= Traumatin =

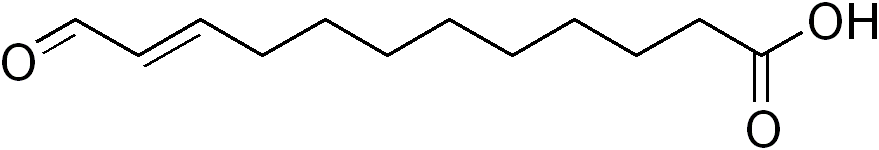

Names
- Preferred IUPAC name (10E)-12-Oxododec-10-enoic acid
- Other names Δ^{10}-ODA

Identifiers
CAS Number	65410-38-0
3D model (JSmol)	Interactive image
ChEBI	CHEBI:19144
ChemSpider	4472314
PubChem CID	5312889
UNII	JJD2J92GPG
CompTox Dashboard (EPA)	DTXSID00895054
- InChI: InChI=1S/C12H20O3/c13-11-9-7-5-3-1-2-4-6-8-10-12(14)15/h7,9,11H,1-6,8,10H2,(H,14,15)/b9-7+ Key: INMKWUNQKOWGEZ-VQHVLOKHSA-N; InChI=1/C12H20O3/c13-11-9-7-5-3-1-2-4-6-8-10-12(14)15/h7,9,11H,1-6,8,10H2,(H,14,15)/b9-7+ Key: INMKWUNQKOWGEZ-VQHVLOKHBG
- SMILES: O=C\C=C\CCCCCCCCC(=O)O

Properties
Chemical formula	C_{12}H_{20}O_{3}
Molar mass	212.2854 g/mol
- Except where otherwise noted, data are given for materials in their standard state (at 25 °C [77 °F], 100 kPa). verify (what is ?) Infobox references

Traumatin is a plant hormone produced in response to wound. Traumatin is a precursor to the related hormone traumatic acid.
