= Traumatic acid =

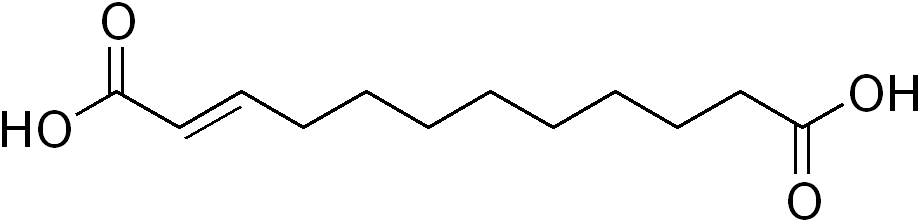

Names
- Preferred IUPAC name (2E)-Dodec-2-enedioic acid
- Other names (E)-Dodec-2-enedioic acid Dodec-2-enedioic acid trans-Traumatic acid

Identifiers
CAS Number	6402-36-4
3D model (JSmol)	Interactive image
ChEMBL	ChEMBL470062
ChemSpider	4446155
ECHA InfoCard	100.026.382
PubChem CID	5283028
UNII	L7ND24937H
CompTox Dashboard (EPA)	DTXSID00863778
- InChI: InChI=1S/C12H20O4/c13-11(14)9-7-5-3-1-2-4-6-8-10-12(15)16/h7,9H,1-6,8,10H2,(H,13,14)(H,15,16)/b9-7+ Key: MAZWDMBCPDUFDJ-VQHVLOKHSA-N
- SMILES: O=C(O)/C=C/CCCCCCCCC(O)=O

Properties
Chemical formula	C_{12}H_{20}O_{4}
Molar mass	228.288 g·mol^{−1}
Melting point	166 to 167 °C (331 to 333 °F; 439 to 440 K)
Boiling point	150 to 160 °C (302 to 320 °F; 423 to 433 K) at 0.001 mmHg
Solubility in water	Sparingly soluble
- Except where otherwise noted, data are given for materials in their standard state (at 25 °C [77 °F], 100 kPa). verify (what is ?) Infobox references

Traumatic acid is a monounsaturated dicarboxylic acid that occurs naturally in plants. The compound was first isolated from wounded bean plants by American chemists James English Jr. and James Frederick Bonner and Dutch scientist Arie Jan Haagen-Smit in 1939. Traumatic acid is a potent wound healing agent in plants ("wound hormone") that stimulates cell division near a trauma site to form a protective callus and to heal the damaged tissue. It may also act as a growth hormone, especially in inferior plants (e.g. algae). Traumatic acid is biosynthesized in plants by non-enzymatic oxidation of traumatin (12-oxo-trans-10-dodecenoic acid), another wound hormone.

Traumatic acid, was among the first biologically active molecules isolated from plant tissues. This dicarboxylic acid was shown to be a potent wound healing agent in plant that stimulates cell division near a wound site, it derives from 18:2 or 18:3 fatty acid hydroperoxides after conversion into oxo- fatty acids.

At normal conditions, traumatic acid is a solid, crystalline, water-insoluble substance. The salts and esters of traumatic acid are called traumatates.

Traumatic acid is used as an intermediate in prostaglandin synthesis. It is also a constituent of some pharmaceutical products, such as the odontostomatologic gel Restomyl, due to its mucosal re-epithelialization activity.
