= Public Health Cigarette Smoking Act =

1970 U.S. federal law

- Long title: An Act to extend public health protection with respect to cigarette smoking and for other purposes.
- Enacted by: the 91st United States Congress
- Effective: April 1, 1970

Citations
- Public law: 91-222
- Statutes at Large: 84 Stat. 87

Codification
- Acts amended: Cigarette Labeling and Advertising Act, Pub. L. 89–92
- Titles amended: XV
- U.S.C. sections amended: 15 United States Code, Sections 1331–1338

Legislative history
- Introduced in the House as H.R. 6543; Committee consideration by Committee on Interstate and Foreign Commerce, Committee on Commerce; Passed the House on June 18th, 1969; Passed the Senate on December 12th, 1969; Signed into law by President Richard Nixon on April 1, 1970

Major amendments
- Comprehensive Smoking Education Act

The Public Health Cigarette Smoking Act is a 1970 federal law in the United States designed to limit the practice of tobacco smoking. As approved by the United States Congress and signed into law by President Richard Nixon, the act required a stronger health warning on packages, saying "Warning: The Surgeon General Has Determined that Cigarette Smoking Is Dangerous to Your Health". It also banned cigarette advertisements on American radio and television.

== Origins ==
The Public Health Cigarette Smoking Act was one of the major bills resulting from the 1964 report by the surgeon general, Luther Terry. The report, which was a request from President John F. Kennedy, found that lung cancer and chronic bronchitis are causally related to cigarette smoking. It was the first Surgeon General’s report of the many to follow. Congress previously passed the Cigarette Labeling and Advertising Act in 1965; requiring that all cigarette packages sold in the United States carry a health warning. But after a recommendation by the Federal Trade Commission, the Public Health Cigarette Smoking Act amended the 1965 law so that the warnings are made in the name of the surgeon general.

One of the major advocates of the cigarette advertising ban was the Federal Communications Commission. The FCC argued that since the topic of smoking is controversial, numerous TV and radio stations continued to break the Fairness Doctrine when airing these commercials because they did not give equal time to the opposing viewpoint that smoking is dangerous.

Passage in Congress: On June 17, 1969, the 91st Congress debated in House. The Public Health Cigarette Smoking Act was created because H.R. 6543 was set to expire on July 1, 1975. The purpose of H.R. 6543 was to create a warning label on cigarette packages. Before H.R. 6543 was set to expire, many people such as the Surgeon General wanted to create a stronger warning label. The bill required cigarette packages to be labeled the following, "Warning, The Surgeon General has determined that cigarette smoking is dangerous to your health and may cause lung cancer or other diseases." During the debate, there were ongoing arguments. For example, the tobacco growers argued that they grow tobacco, not cancer. The tobacco company and growers were scared that they were going to be put out of business and the health department was scared more people would die from cigarette smoking. On, December 12, 1969, The Senate debated, amended, and passed the bill. During the debate, a chart was shown, depicting the correlation between death rates and cigarette smoking. The chart showed that the death rate goes up as the number of cigarettes smoked increases.

Provisions: The Public Health Cigarette Smoking Act bans cigarette commercials from airing on the radio and television. The act also strengthened the health warning label on cigarette packages. According to the CDC, The Public Health Cigarette Smoking Act also bans states or localities from promoting cigarette advertising for health related reasons.

The Public Health Cigarette Smoking Act was introduced into Congress in 1969, but it was not until April 1, 1970, when U.S. president Richard Nixon signed it into law. The actual cigarette advertising ban did not come into force until January 2, 1971, as per a compromise that allowed broadcasters to air these commercials during their telecasts of college football bowl games on New Year's Day. The last cigarette ad on U.S. television, advertising Virginia Slims, was carried on the last possible legal minute at 11:59 p.m ET/PT, 10:59 p.m. CT/MT that evening on NBC's The Tonight Show Starring Johnny Carson.

== Effects ==
In 1981, the FTC reported that the health warning labels as mandated by the Public Health Cigarette Smoking Act had little effect on U.S. smoking habits. Congress therefore passed the Comprehensive Smoking Education Act of 1984, requiring more specific health warnings. In 1986, the Health Protection Act was implemented to complete the ban of tobacco advertising on television and radio which began in 1970. In 2009, the Family Smoking Prevention and Tobacco Control Act (FSPTCA) was implemented as Congresses amendment to the Federal Cigarette Labeling and Advertising Act (FCLAA) of 1965. The FSPTCA was signed on 22 June 2009 and is also referred to as the Tobacco Control Act.

The tobacco industry has begun to use a variety of other marketing tools and strategies to influence people and attract new customers. Firms shifted away from media-based advertising and began promoting though print media like newspapers, magazines and billboards or coupons, event sponsorship, promotion allowances and added bonuses. In particular, ads targeted to adolescents affect their perceptions on the image and function of smoking. In 1991, the Journal of the American Medical Association published a study showing that more children aged 5 and 6 years old, could recognize Camel cigarettes' Joe Camel mascot than Mickey Mouse or Fred Flintstone. Camel increased its adolescent customer base dramatically, from less than 1% before 1988 to more than 13% in 1993. Tobacco sought protection from Congress so they could all leave broadcasting together without violating any anti-trust laws. The only lawsuit that followed was from a broadcaster in an effort to keep tobacco advertising on television and radio.

The law also affected advertising revenues on television and radio stations, along with the current imposition of Financial Interest and Syndication Rules and the Prime Time Access Rule, which also both took effect in 1971. NBC responded by pushing its broadcast day later into the overnight, adding shows such as The Midnight Special and The Tomorrow Show to open up further advertising inventory.

In 2014, a 53% reduction in smoking rates was predicted due to policies that were implanted since the first report in 1964. Also since then, the Office on Smoking and Health of CDC has published more over 35 reports on smoking health consequences.

The FDA finalized the Required Warnings for Cigarette Packages and Advertisement in March 2020, with 11 new health warnings with color graphic images.

== External resources ==
- Federal Cigarette Labeling and Advertising Act, as amended (PDF/details) in the GPO Statute Compilations collection
