= Hodgkins Medal =

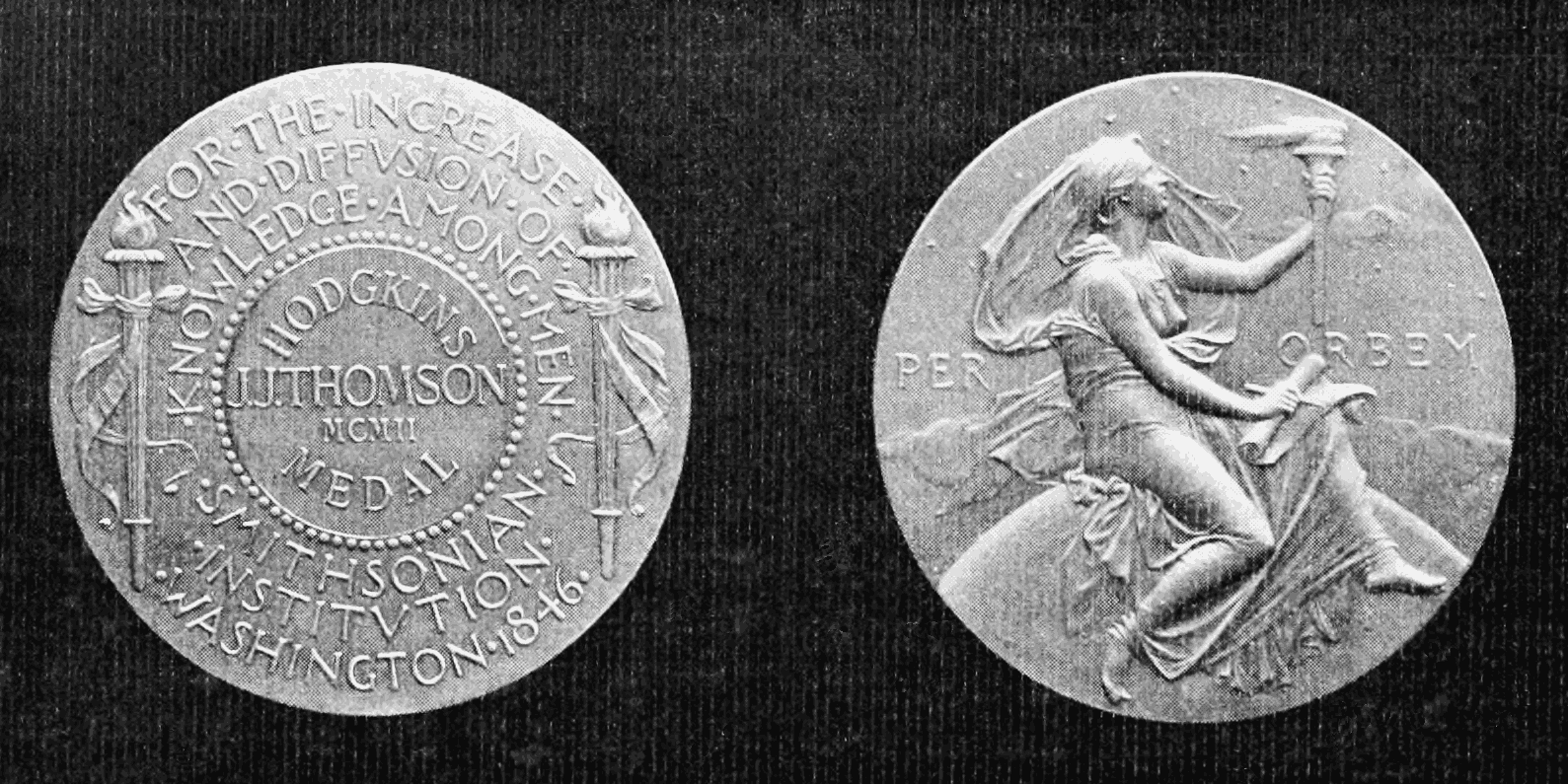
- Hodgkins medal awarded to J.J. Thomson, 1902
- Description: Contributions to the understanding of the physical environment
- Presented by: Smithsonian Institution

The Hodgkins Medal is awarded annually or biennially by the Smithsonian Institution for important contributions to the understanding of the physical environment as it affects the welfare of man.

It was established in 1893 in honor of Thomas George Hodgkins, who left his fortune to the Smithsonian, stipulating that a portion be used to promote atmospheric research.

== Recipients ==
Recipients include:

- 1899 – James Dewar
- 1902 – Joseph John Thomson
- 1965 – Joseph Kaplan, Marcel Nicolet, Sydney Chapman
- 1967 – Frits W. Went, John Grahame Douglas Clark
- 1969 – Arie Jan Haagen-Smit, Jule Gregory Charney
- 1971 – Lewis Mumford
- 1973 – Walter Orr Roberts
- 1976 – E. Cuyler Hammond
- 1978 – Alexander Dalgarno
- 1980 – Luigi Giuseppe Jacchia

== See also ==
- List of environmental awards
