= Cipollone v. Liggett Group, Inc. =

- Supreme Court of the United States

Argued October 8, 1991 Reargued January 13, 1992 Decided June 24, 1992
- Full case name: Thomas Cipollone, Individually and As Executor of the Estate of Rose D. Cipollone v. Liggett Group, Inc., et al.
- Citations: 505 U.S. 504 (more) 112 S. Ct. 2608; 120 L. Ed. 2d 407; 60 U.S.L.W. 4703; CCH Prod. Liab. Rep. ¶ 13,199; 17 U.C.C. Rep. Serv. 2d (Callaghan) 1087; 92 Cal. Daily Op. Service 5517; 92 Daily Journal DAR 8688; 6 Fla. L. Weekly Fed. S 589

Case history
- Prior: 893 F.2d 541 (3d Cir. 1990) Interpretation of previous federal law preemption decision as barring plaintiff's failure to warn, fraudulent misrepresentation, express warranty, and conspiracy to defraud claims affirmed. Reversal on other issues require a remand for a new trial. 693 F. Supp. 208 (D.N.J. 1988) Defendants' motion for judgment notwithstanding the jury verdict for the plaintiff and other post-trial motions denied. 683 F. Supp. 1487 (D.N.J. 1988) Motion to strike design defect claim granted (not appealed). 107 S. Ct. 907, 93 L. Ed. 2d 857 (1987) Certiorari denied, case returned for trial. 789 F.2d 181 (3d Cir. 1986) Ruling on motion reversed, remanded for further proceedings. 593 F. Supp. 1146 (D.N.J. 1984) Motion to strike federal law preemption defense granted.

Holding
- In this divided ruling, the Court found that a 1966 federal cigarette labeling law did not preempt state law damages actions; but later amendments to the act in 1969 did preclude not just "failure to warn" claims, but also on the broader duty "to inform consumers of known risks." The 1969 amendments, however, did not preempt claims based on express warranty, intentional fraud and misrepresentation, or conspiracy. The judgment of the Court of Appeals is reversed in part and affirmed in part, and the case is remanded for further proceedings.

Court membership
- Chief Justice William Rehnquist Associate Justices Byron White · Harry Blackmun; John P. Stevens · Sandra Day O'Connor; Antonin Scalia · Anthony Kennedy; David Souter · Clarence Thomas

Case opinions
- Majority: Stevens, joined by Rehnquist, White, Blackmun, O'Connor, Kennedy, and Souter (Parts I, II, III, and IV)
- Plurality: Stevens, joined by Rehnquist, White and O'Connor (Parts V and VI)
- Concur/dissent: Blackmun, joined by Kennedy and Souter
- Concur/dissent: Scalia, joined by Thomas

Laws applied
- Federal Cigarette Labeling and Advertising Act of 1965, 15 U.S.C.S. §§ 1331-1340

Surgeon General's Warning; Live Press Conference; January 1964 First Report on Smoking

Cipollone v. Liggett Group, Inc., 505 U.S. 504 (1992), was a United States Supreme Court case. In a split opinion, the court held that the Surgeon General's tobacco packaging warning did not preclude lawsuits by smokers against tobacco companies on the basis of several claims. The case examined whether tobacco companies could be liable for not warning the consumer "adequately" of the dangers of cigarettes and questioned the 1965 Cigarette Labeling and Advertising Act in determining whether the warning labels on cigarette products by law had to be less or more alarming than the warning issued.

The court's holding and some of Justice John Paul Stevens' reasoning enjoyed majority support, but the opinion only gained full majority support 16 years later in 2008's Altria Group v. Good.

== Background ==
Tobacco had for centuries been a staple economic resource in the fabric of the American economy, including amongst Native American tribes. It was instrumental in the early economic development of the colonial United States. Following this period, the cigarette began to rise in popularity toward the end of the 1800s. Tobacco and smoking grew deeply embedded in the culture and lifestyle of the American public, associated with notions like "sex[iness], cool[ness], [and] masculin[ity]". However, in the mid-1900s, skepticism regarding smoking grew and the public began to push for research into the health risks of smoking. Research and analysis discovered many connections to diseases, including coronary artery disease, peripheral artery disease, cerebrovascular disease, lung cancer, laryngeal cancer, oral cancer, esophageal cancer, bladder cancer, and pancreatic cancer). Public health advocates urged the banning of cigarette sales and the overall production of cigarettes in order to protect the public.

With a battle between tobacco companies and public health advocates ensuing, litigation against tobacco companies began in earnest. In the 1950s, people began filing litigation against tobacco companies for health consequences associated with smoking cigarettes. Many of these cases ended in victories for tobacco companies, as litigants in the beginning of this new era were often not able to prove a concrete association between smoking and diseases.

Into the 1970s, the cultural tide on smoking continued to turn against tobacco companies. In addition to liability laws changing from the 1950s, plaintiffs no longer had to prove negligence on the part of the company with regards to their product, but simply expose a product defect. The association between smoking and diseases like cancer became clearer as medical evidence grew more advanced than in previous decades, leaving tobacco companies fewer options. The Surgeon General's Warning in 1964, "Warning: The Surgeon General has determined that cigarette smoking is dangerous to your health", also served to close the legal gap between the two concepts. The confluence of these factors led lawsuits to surge.

=== Plaintiff ===
Rose Cipollone began smoking at the age of sixteen. She smoked up to a pack and a half a pack per day of Chesterfield cigarettes. It wasn't until she was pregnant and at her husband Antonio's request, that she attempted to quit smoking. Though she cut down on her regular smoking, she still secretly smoked during her pregnancy. In 1955, Cipollone switched to Liggett and Myer brand cigarettes on the basis that their "pure white Miracle Tip" filter appeared to be a healthier alternative to Chesterfield. In 1968, she switched to Parliament brand cigarettes, citing conditions attributed to her health as her reasoning because Parliaments were advertised to have a recessed filter and lower tar content than that of other competitive cigarette brands. Finally, she switched to Lorillard's True brand cigarettes under the recommendation of her physician, who had offered her the options of quitting smoking or switching Lorillard's due to its advertised plastic filter inserts.

While Cipollone was trying to decide which brand of cigarettes was right for her, she was simultaneously suffering the health effects of smoking. In the mid-1960s, she began to develop a smoker's cough, as well as problems such as chest pain and hypertension. In 1981, doctors found a carcinomatous spot on her right lung and performed a partial lung resection. Despite the multitude of consultations and operations she had experienced to that point, she still continued to smoke, "though often now in secret". In 1982, the cancer had spread to her lower and middle right lung, and she had surgery to remove the entire lung as well as a large adrenal mass in 1983. She died on October 24, 1984, after her lung cancer spread and became inoperable.

The year before Cipollone's death, she met attorney Marc Edell. Edell was familiar with suing companies regarding negligence to protect consumer health. He had previously represented asbestos companies defending health-related claims brought against them. From that case, he had become familiar with the "pulmonary pathology and risks of smoking" and became interested in litigation against the tobacco industry. In need of a client, he took on Cipollone's case. He filed suit in District Court for the District of New Jersey against Liggett and Myers, Philip Morris, and Lorillard including fourteen tort complaints on August 1, 1983, just over a year before her death. The action was brought in federal court as a diversity jurisdiction case.

== Case history ==
=== District Court ===
==== First case ====
Edell gathered facts to bring a series of claims to court arguing the following:

- Tobacco companies had failed to and were negligent in putting better designs of cigarettes on the market when they had the resources to do so;
- They had committed fraud by failing to act on their knowledge of the harms of smoking;
- They had failed to fully inform the public of the true risks of smoking;
- They had breached express warranties by making health claims in their advertising and promotions that fraudulently overshadowed the mandated health warnings;
- They had conspired to prevent third-party groups from releasing health information on the hazards of cigarettes; and
- Under liability rules and law, Cipollone should be compensated for pain and suffering caused by her illness.

Liggett and Myers, Philip Morris, and Lorillard all cited the 1965 Cigarette Labeling and Advertising Act in their defense, arguing that the act preempted independent state regulation of tobacco and therefore prevented state litigation, making the tobacco industry immune to state law suits. From there, they moved to dismiss the case. Trial judge H. Lee Sarokin ruled in favor of Cipollone, stating that while state legislatures were prohibited from requiring specific warning labels and regulation of cigarettes, calling into question the inadequacy of the ones already present was acceptable. The ruling was later overturned on interlocutory appeal by the Court of Appeals for the Third Circuit. However, the court did allow the case to be retried in district court on the condition that no claims regarding advertisement and promotion be made. Edell accepted that condition and prepared for retrial.

==== Second case ====
In the retrial, Edell was not allowed to enter evidence claiming that Liggett & Myers had worked on the creation of a safer cigarette, nor regarding the tobacco industry's "duty to warn" of the dangers of cigarette smoking. He nevertheless supported his case with his access to 300,000 pages of tobacco companies' internal documents including compelling evidence that the tobacco companies had proof, backed by research dating back to the 1940s, that nicotine was addictive and potentially carcinogenic. Before the trial could begin, however, the tobacco companies unsuccessfully attempted to suppress Edell's evidence papers on the grounds that they would "divulge trade secrets"; trial judge Sarokin ruled that the people had the constitutional right to know what the companies knew and granted the use of the papers. The tobacco companies unsuccessfully continued to attempt to thwart Edell's efforts, appealing both to the Third Circuit, which upheld Sarokin's ruling, and the Supreme Court, which declined to hear the case.

Alongside the tobacco industry documents, Edell argued that the advertising for the brands Cipollone smoked was an unscrupulous strategy used by the tobacco industry to not only overshadow the warning labels mandated by the federal government, but also to promote cigarette use and nicotine addiction as a marketing strategy for company profit. He claimed that Cipollone's tobacco use stemmed from nicotine addiction, which was encouraged by Liggett and Myers, Philip Morris, and Lorillard via both health claims and advertising. He ensured that Cipollone was portrayed as a woman who had been badly hurt by her addiction to the tobacco industry's product; expert testimony showed that she displayed withdrawal symptoms, sometimes digging through "the trash for butts when she ran out of cigarettes." After presenting his case regarding the tobacco industry's advertising of cigarettes and knowledge of risk related to Cipollone's claims, the companies' defense moved for dismissal, but the motion was denied.

The tobacco industry argued that Cipollone was fully aware of the risks of smoking both before and during her cigarette use, calling her "an independent woman, making an independent decision to continue smoking, and she was in control, not the nicotine." The companies also claimed that, even if the cigarettes had caused her death, it was in no way the responsibility of the industry. On the documents used in trial, they argued that Edell had failed to show any explicit proof that lung cancer was linked directly to smoking. Furthermore, their expert testimony indicated that the type of lung cancer affecting Cipollone was not associated with smoking. They also argued that her switching between "healthier" brands showed her acknowledgment of the dangers of smoking.

The six-person jury, composed of three non-smokers, two former smokers, and one current smoker, deliberated for six days, and reached a verdict on June 3, 1988, considering the conspiracy claims and the lack of expression in warranty and warning argued by Edell and concluding that:

- Cipollone was 80% at fault, based on their assessment of her personal choice to smoke being a factor;
- All claims for failure to warn should be dropped against Philip Morris and Lorillard, since she began smoking their cigarettes after the 1966 federally mandated warning labels began appearing on the packages;
- Only Liggett & Myers could be held liable, as she smoked their cigarettes before the 1966 warning labels;
- Liggett & Myers did contribute to her death;
- Her husband Antonio Cipollone, who had continued to fight the case after her death, should be awarded $400,000 in damages; and
- The claim regarding the tobacco industry's withholding of production of a safer cigarette should be dismissed on the grounds that it involved speculation as to whether she would have in fact chosen to smoke the safer option if given the opportunity.

Edell was pleased that they had been awarded damages and saw it as a victory, but commented in an interview sometime after the ruling that he had hoped the courts would have gone further with their condemnation of the tobacco industry.

=== Court of Appeals ===
After the district court's ruling, the tobacco companies appealed to the Court of Appeals for the Third Circuit in hopes of reversing the verdict.

In 1990, the Third Circuit threw out the verdict and:

- Set aside the $400,000 in damages on the grounds that there was no proof that Cipollone relied on the Liggett & Myers advertisements in question;
- Allowed Edell to file suit on the basis of design and advertising and to claim that, prior to the Cigarette Labeling and Advertising Act, tobacco companies did not inform the average unaware smoker on the dangers of smoking despite knowing that information;
- Allowed Edell to argue that the tobacco industry could be held liable on a claim that the company had not made her aware of the product's dangers outweighing its benefits.

Five days after the appellate ruling, Cipollone's husband Antonio Cipollone died, upon which their son continued on with the case. Edell and the companies both still sought a concrete doctrine regarding the ability to litigate preemption, state regulation of tobacco, and the Cigarette Labeling and Advertising Act. Edell appealed to the Supreme Court.

== Supreme Court ==
The Supreme Court of the United States considered whether the 1965 Cigarette Labeling and Advertising Act preempted Cipollone's state law damages claims against cigarette manufacturers. The Court affirmed the Third Circuit's judgment in part and reversed it in part. Justice John Paul Stevens wrote the majority opinion in Parts I–IV, joined by Chief Justice William Rehnquist and Justices Byron White, Harry Blackmun, Sandra Day O'Connor, Anthony Kennedy, and David Souter, and announced the court's opinion in a plurality opinion in Parts V–VI, joined only by Justices Rehnquist, White, and O'Connor. Stevens held for the majority that the law did not preempt state law damages claims, and that while its restrictions on statements about smoking and health displaced state law requirements, in light of a general presumption against finding preemption the law should not be held to preempt state law beyond where it explicitly did so.

=== Plurality ===
Justice Stevens held for a plurality of the court that broader provisions regarding prohibiting state-law requirements or prohibitions based on smoking and health concerning the advertising or promotion of properly labeled cigarettes encompassed some common law duties. On that basis, he concluded that:

- Failure-to-warn claims against the tobacco industry regarding post-1969 advertising or promotion were preempted, while testing and research claims unrelated to advertising and promotion were not preempted;
- Breach of express warranty claims were not preempted;
- Fraudulent misrepresentation claims alleging that advertising neutralized the federally required warnings were preempted, while claims alleging intentionally false statements were not preempted; and
- Conspiracy to misrepresent or conceal claims were not preempted.

=== Concur/dissents ===
==== Blackmun ====
Justice Blackmun, joined by Justices Kennedy and Souter, concurred in part, concurred in the judgment in part, and dissented in part. He joined Justice Stevens' majority opinion, but would have held that none of the common-law damages claims dealt with in Stevens' plurality opinion were preeempted.

==== Scalia ====
Justice Antonin Scalia, joined by Justice Clarence Thomas, concurred in the judgment in part and dissented in part. He stated that all claims were preempted by federal law. He took issue with the majority's general presumption against finding preemption, arguing that standard statutory interpretation principles led to the conclusion that broader preemption was required. He also took issue with the plurality’s treatment of testing and research claims unrelated to advertising and promotion, express warranty claims, fraudulent misrepresentation claims alleging intentionally false statements, and conspiracy claims.

== Subsequent developments and legacy ==
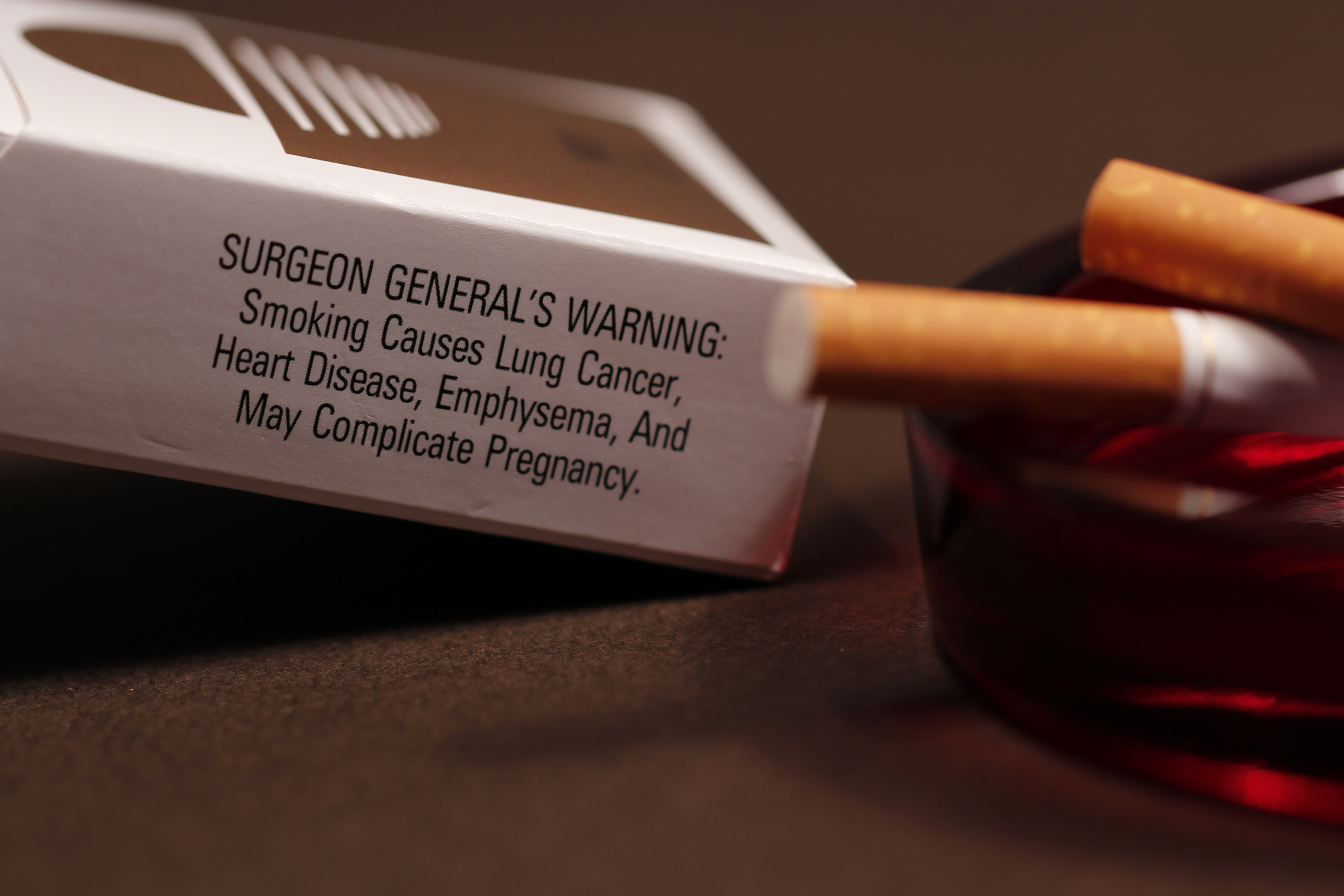
A modern warning on cigarette packaging.

The Supreme Court remanded Cipollone for a new trial, which never occurred because the $400,000 verdict for Cipollone from the original trial had been far eclipsed by the exorbitant costs and length of the suit and almost half of the ten years since the case was filed had been spent on post-trial matters. Rose Cipollone's son filed for a voluntary withdrawal of the suit on November 4, 1992. Though Cipollone's lawyers claimed that their point had been made, the withdrawal was seen as a tacit surrender to the tobacco industry.

Six other tobacco liability cases were withdrawn the same month as well. In 1988, Phillip Morris was quoted as saying: "Almost 200 lawsuits have been brought in the last five and a half years and the cigarette manufacturers have not ... paid a penny to settle one." As of 1992, the law firms handling Cipollone and seven other tobacco litigation cases had "incurred approximately $1.2 million in out-of-pocket expenses ... [and] well over $5 million in lawyer and paralegal time". The last remaining case handled by those firms, Haines v. Liggett Group, Inc., dragged on for over another decade until a settlement order was approved on April 13, 2004.

The 1988 district court jury verdict in Cipollone was the first jury award of damages to a plaintiff in a cigarette product-liability case. Although the damages were subsequently overturned, the case produced testimony and uncovered tobacco industry internal documents concerning manufacturers' knowledge of the health risks of smoking, which supported allegations that the industry had concealed those risks and suppressed efforts to develop safer cigarettes. Public health law scholar Micah L. Berman identified the case as thereby contributing to the emergence of a moderately successful "third wave" of tobacco litigation in the early 1990s following the unsuccessful first and second waves, which had failed first because the industry successfully argued that the "connection between smoking and lung cancer had not been conclusively established", then once the risks had been established that they were "common knowledge". This included further individual lawsuits, actions alleging "secondhand smoke exposure and violations of consumer protection laws," and suits by state governments to recover smoking-related healthcare costs. The state litigation culminated with the 1998 Tobacco Master Settlement Agreement, which required "the major tobacco companies ... to pay more than $200 billion to the states and limit their marketing in various ways" and "required further disclosure of industry documents."

Cipollone also, however, demonstrated the financial difficulties facing individual plaintiffs in tobacco litigation. Tort law scholars Nora Freeman Engstrom and Robert L. Rabin described the case as an example of how prolonged litigation and disparities in resources may prevent plaintiffs from obtaining compensation even where they receive favorable jury verdicts and survive further legal claims at the appellate level, describing it as an instance where the plaintiff "quit in exhaustion".

The Supreme Court returned to the preemption analysis from Cipollone in 2008's Altria Group, Inc. v. Good. In a 5–4 decision also authored by Justice John Paul Stevens, it held that federal law did not preempt Maine's consumer protection statute with respect to claims alleging deceptive marketing of "light" cigarettes, adopting the Cipollone plurality's holding that the Cigarette Labeling and Advertising Act "does not pre-empt state-law claims ... that are predicated on the duty not to deceive."

== See also ==
- Tobacco Master Settlement Agreement
- Truth (anti-tobacco campaign)
- United States v. Philip Morris
