= James A. Schoenberger =

James A. Schoenberger (1919–2011) was a Chicago cardiologist and medical research scientist who participated in early epidemiological studies and clinical trials that provided evidence linking smoking and other risk factors to cardiovascular diseases. He was Professor and Chairman of the Department of Preventive Medicine at Rush University Medical Center (1973–1994) and served as president of the American Heart Association (1980–81). He was a public health advocate who participated in educational outreach programs. As an expert source, he utilized the national news media to warn Americans of the dangers of smoking and eating fatty foods. He lobbied the federal government to enact legislation that who impose more stringent regulation on the sale and advertising of tobacco products.

Before retiring in 1994, he founded the Alzheimer's Research Center at Rush University Medical Center, which later evolved into the Rush Alzheimer's Disease Center. He continued to write academic articles and lecture as professor emeritus.

== Advocacy ==
In his 1982 letter to President Ronald Reagan, Schoenberger criticized the administration for its decision to reverse policy and oppose hazard warning labels on cigarette packs:

"I am quite concerned and puzzled by this news," he wrote. "Much of my professional career has been devoted to medical practice in cardiology and to teaching and research in the fields of preventive medicine and epidemiology. I am convinced that there is no single act that would do more to reduce illness, premature deaths and the immense costs of health care and lost productivity in our nation than would preventing the smoking of cigarettes."

== Early career ==
After graduating from medical school he became a captain in the Army Medical Corps (1944–46) and served in Occupied Japan (1945–46). After completing his residency in medicine at the University of Chicago, he taught and practiced clinical medicine at the University of Illinois Medical College, where he began his research in the etiology of cardiovascular diseases (1950–67). He survived a near-fatal episode polio in 1954 and started a private clinical practice and that year in the western Chicago suburb of Hinsdale, Illinois, serving the local community as a cardiologist and family practitioner and also continuing his research part-time at the University of Illinois and the Chicago Heart Association. He returned to full-time teaching and academic research at Rush Medical University in 1967.

== Education ==
He attended Public schools in his hometown of Cleveland Heights, Ohio, graduating from high school in 1937. He earned his B.S. at the University of Chicago in 1941, and was awarded his M.D.. with Honors in Pathology at the University of Chicago Medical School in 1943.5 He received the university's Distinguished Service Award for Alumni in 1982.

== Selected journal articles ==
- JAMA (1972)
- Current Status of Hypertension Control in an Industrial Population, 1972; 222
- The American Journal of Cardiology (1986)

Epidemiology of systolic and diastolic systemic blood pressure elevation in the elderly, Volume 57, Issue 5, 12 February 1986

- The American Journal of Medicine (1988)

New approaches to a first-line treatment of hypertension, March 25, 1988

- Archives of Internal Medicine (1990) Efficacy, Safety, and Quality-of-Life Assessment of Captopril Antihypertensive Therapy in Clinical Practice, 1990;150
- Preventive Cardiology (2000) Cardiovascular risk of smoking and benefits of smoking cessation, Apr 18, 2000
