= Stop Tobacco Smuggling in the Territories Act of 2013 =

- Long title: To amend title 18, United States Code, to include certain territories and possessions of the United States in the definition of State for the purposes of chapter 114, relating to trafficking in contraband cigarettes and smokeless tobacco.
- Announced in: the 113th United States Congress
- Sponsored by: Del. Eni F. H. Faleomavaega (D, AS-0)
- Number of co-sponsors: 3

Codification
- U.S.C. sections affected: 18 U.S.C. § 2341(4),

Legislative history
- Introduced in the House as H.R. 338 by Rep. Eni Faleomavaega (American Samoa) on January 22, 2013; Committee consideration by United States House Committee on the Judiciary, United States House Judiciary Subcommittee on Crime, Terrorism, Homeland Security and Investigations, United States Senate Committee on the Judiciary; Passed the House on March 5, 2013 (421-5)

The Stop Tobacco Smuggling in the Territories Act of 2013 (H.R. 338) was a bill introduced into the United States House of Representatives in the 113th United States Congress that passed the House with a vote of 421–5. The purpose of the bill is to redefine "state" in the Contraband Cigarette Trafficking Act of 1978 ("the 1978 Act") to add American Samoa, the Commonwealth of the Northern Mariana Islands, and Guam, so that United States laws against tobacco smuggling would apply in those places. The 1978 Act makes it a felony to smuggle cigarettes from one area to another without paying the appropriate taxes. Smugglers trafficking in cigarettes transport cigarettes to jurisdictions with high cigarette taxes, avoid paying the taxes, and then sell the smuggled cigarettes with a large profit margin, while still selling their cigarettes for a cheaper price than those that could be purchased legally.

== Background ==
A similar bill, H.R. 5934, was passed by the House in the 112th United States Congress on November 14, 2012. That bill was also introduced by Rep. Eni Faleomavaega. The bill did not pass in the Senate and therefore died with the end of the 112th Congress.

== Provisions/Elements of the bill ==
This summary is based largely on the summary provided by the Congressional Research Service, a public domain source.

The Bill would amend the federal law (18 U.S.C. § 2341) to include American Samoa, the Commonwealth of the Northern Mariana Islands, and Guam in the definition of "state" for purposes of provisions prohibiting trafficking in contraband cigarettes and smokeless tobacco.

The 1978 Act makes it a federal crime to knowingly ship, transport, receive, possess, sell, distribute, or purchase 10,000 or more contraband cigarettes. Violation of the law counts as a felony with a penalty of up to five years in prison, plus confiscation of the cigarettes. The Bill is necessary to add American Samoa, the Commonwealth of the Northern Mariana Islands, and Guam to the definition of "state" in the original law because they were not part of the United States at the time when the law was written. The Virgin Islands, Washington DC, and Puerto Rico were already included.

== Procedural history ==
The Bill was introduced into the House of Representatives on January 22, 2013, by Rep. Eni Faleomavaega (American Samoa). Representatives Gregorio Sablan (D-MP), Madeleine Bordallo (D-GU), and Pedro Pierluisi (D-PR) were all immediate co-sponsors. Rep. Donna Christian-Christensen (D-VI) was the final cosponsor, joining the others on March 5, 2013. Together, they comprised five of the six non-voting delegates to the United States Congress (the sixth delegate is the delegate from Washington, D.C.). The Bill was referred to the United States House Committee on the Judiciary on January 22, 2013, and then to the United States House Judiciary Subcommittee on Crime, Terrorism, Homeland Security and Investigations on February 28, 2013. It was considered on the House floor on March 5, 2013, under a suspension of the rules; it passed later that same day. The vote was 421–5.

The Senate received the Bill on March 7, 2013. It was referred to the United States Senate Committee on the Judiciary.

== Public debate ==
Rep. Eni Faleomavaega (American Samoa) expressed his support for the Bill, when he was speaking to Samoan reporters. He said, "American Samoa faces a serious problem of tobacco smuggling. According to a recent study, in 2010 alone, as many as 5.8 million cigarettes were smuggled into the territory. The study found that tobacco smuggling resulted in a loss estimated about $724,116 in revenues to the American Samoan government."

Rep. Gregorio Sablan (I-MP) wrote on his website that he supported the Bill because "cigarette smuggling is costing the Commonwealth tens of thousands of dollars in lost excise tax revenues and hurts local businesses." According to the Representative, in February 2012 the "Commonwealth Customs officers seized 5,000 cartons of contraband cigarettes that would (have been) worth about $100,000 in excise tax revenue" if they had been imported legally into the Northern Mariana Islands. He argued that the passage of the Bill would give law enforcement officers in Northern Mariana Islands new tools to fight smuggling.

== See also ==
- Territories of the United States
- Smuggling
- Cigarette taxes in the United States
- Cigarette smuggling
