= Cigarette Labeling and Advertising Act =

Act providing national standards for cigarette packaging in the US

- Other short titles: Federal Cigarette Labeling and Advertising Act of 1965
- Long title: An Act to regulate the labeling of cigarettes, and for other purposes.
- Nicknames: Cigarette Act
- Enacted by: the 89th United States Congress
- Effective: January 1, 1966

Citations
- Public law: 89-92
- Statutes at Large: 79 Stat. 282

Codification
- Titles amended: 15 U.S.C.: Commerce and Trade
- U.S.C. sections created: 15 U.S.C. ch. 36 § 1331 et seq.

Legislative history
- Introduced in the Senate as S. 559 by Warren Magnuson (D-WA) on January 15, 1965; Committee consideration by Senate Commerce Committee, Interstate and Foreign Commerce Committee; Passed the Senate on June 16, 1965 (72-5); Passed the House on June 22, 1965 (passed voice vote, in lieu of H.R. 3014); Reported by the joint conference committee on July 1, 1965; agreed to by the Senate on July 6, 1965 (passed voice vote) and by the House on July 13, 1965 (293-110); Signed into law by President Lyndon B. Johnson on July 27, 1965

Major amendments
- Public Health Cigarette Smoking Act of 1969; Comprehensive Smoking Education Act of 1986; Family Smoking Prevention and Tobacco Control Act of 2009

The Federal Cigarette Labeling and Advertising Act (also known as the Cigarette Act) is a comprehensive act designed to provide a set of national standards for cigarette packaging in the United States. It was amended by the Public Health Cigarette Smoking Act of 1969, Comprehensive Smoking Education Act of 1984, and the Family Smoking Prevention and Tobacco Control Act of 2009. It came in conflict with California Proposition 65.

== Provisions of the Act ==
=== Declaration of Policy ===
It is the policy and the purpose of this Act, to establish a comprehensive Federal program to deal with cigarette labeling and advertising with respect to any relationship between smoking and health, whereby —

(1) The public may be adequately informed that cigarette smoking may be hazardous to health by inclusion of a warning to that effect on each package of cigarettes.
(2) Commerce and the national economy may be —

(A) Protected to the maximum extent consistent with this declared policy.
(B) Not impeded by diverse, nonuniform, and confusing cigarette labeling and advertising regulations with respect to any relationship between smoking and health.

=== Definitions ===
As used in this Act —

(1) Cigarette means —

(A) Any roll of tobacco wrapped in paper or in any substance not containing tobacco.
(B) Any roll of tobacco wrapped in any substance containing tobacco which, because of its appearance, the type of tobacco used in the filler, or its packaging and labeling, is likely to be offered to, or purchased by, consumers as a cigarette described in subparagraph (A).

(2) Commerce means —

(A) Commerce between any State, District of Columbia, Commonwealth of Puerto Rico, Guam, Virgin Islands, American Samoa, Wake Island, Midway Islands, Kingman Reef, or Johnston Island and any place outside thereof.
(B) Commerce between points in any State, District of Columbia, Commonwealth of Puerto Rico, Guam, Virgin Islands, American Samoa, Wake Island, Midway Islands, Kingman Reef, or Johnston Island, but through any place outside thereof.
(C) Commerce wholly within the District of Columbia, Guam, Virgin Islands, American Samoa, Wake Island, Midway Islands, Kingman Reef, or Johnston Island.

(3) United States, when used in a geographical sense, includes the several States, District of Columbia, Commonwealth of Puerto Rico, Guam, Virgin Islands, American Samoa, Wake Island, Midway Islands, Kingman Reef, and Johnston Island.
(4) Package means a pack, box, carton, or container of any kind in which cigarettes are offered for sale, sold, or otherwise distributed to consumers.
(5) Person means an individual, partnership, corporation, or any other business or legal entity.
(6) Sale or Distribution includes sampling or any other distribution not for sale.

=== Labeling ===
It shall be unlawful for any person to manufacture, import, or package for sale or distribution within the United States any cigarettes the package of which fails to bear the following statement:

- CAUTION: CIGARETTE SMOKING MAY BE HAZARDOUS TO YOUR HEALTH

Such statement shall be located in a conspicuous place on every cigarette package and shall appear in conspicuous and legible type in contrast by typography, layout, or color with other printed matter on the package.

=== Preemption ===
(a) No statement relating to smoking and health, other than the statement required by this Act, shall be required on any cigarette package.
(b) No statement relating to smoking and health shall be required in the advertising of any cigarettes the packages of which are labeled in conformity with the provisions of this Act.
(c) Except as is otherwise provided in subsections (a) and (b), nothing in this Act shall be construed to limit, restrict, expand, or otherwise affect, the authority of the Federal Trade Commission with respect to unfair or deceptive acts or practices in the advertising of cigarettes, nor to affirm or deny the Federal Trade Commission's holding that it has the authority to issue trade regulation rules or to require an affirmative statement in any cigarette advertisement.
(d) For the purpose of this Act —

(1) Secretary of Health, Education, and Welfare shall transmit a report to the Congress not later than eighteen months after the effective date of this Act, and annually thereafter, concerning

(A) Current information on the health consequences of smoking.
(B) Such recommendations for legislation as the Secretary may deem appropriate.

(2) The Federal Trade Commission shall transmit a report to the Congress not later than eighteen months after the effective date of this Act, and annually thereafter, concerning —

(A) The effectiveness of cigarette labeling.
(B) Current practices and methods of cigarette advertising and promotion.
(C) Such recommendations for legislation as it may deem appropriate.

=== Criminal Penalty ===
Any person who violates the provisions of this Act shall be guilty of a misdemeanor and shall on conviction thereof subject to a fine of not more than $100,000.

=== Injunction Proceedings ===
The United States district courts are invested with jurisdiction, for cause shown, to prevent and restrain violations of this Act upon the application of the United States Attorney General acting through the several United States attorneys in their several districts.

=== Cigarettes for Export ===
Packages of cigarettes manufactured, imported, or packaged —

(1) For export from the United States.
(2) For delivery to a vessel or aircraft, as supplies, for consumption beyond the jurisdiction of the internal revenue laws of the United States shall be exempt from the requirements of this Act, but such exemptions shall not apply to cigarettes manufactured, imported, or packaged for sale or distribution to members or units of the United States Armed Forces located outside of the United States.

=== Separability ===
If any provision of this Act or the application thereof to any person or circumstances is held invalid, the other provisions of this Act and the application of such provision to other persons or circumstances shall not be affected thereby.

=== Termination of Provisions Affecting Regulation of Advertising ===
The provisions of this Act which affect the regulation of advertising shall terminate on July 1, 1969, but such termination shall not be construed as limiting, expanding, or otherwise affecting the jurisdiction or authority which the Federal Trade Commission or any other Federal agency had prior to the date of enactment of this Act.

== Historical context ==
The U.S. Surgeon General Luther Terry issued a detailed report saying that cigarette smoking was a health hazard on January 11, 1964. In June 1964, the Federal Trade Commission (FTC) announced several new requirements of the tobacco industry. Beginning on January 1, 1965, the tobacco industry would have to put health warning labels on their cigarette packages and that starting July 1, 1965, similar health warnings would be required in their advertisements. The tobacco industry responded with lobbying efforts on Capitol Hill and a public relations campaign that included brochures such as the previously produced "Tobacco—a vital U.S. Industry," stressing the economic importance of the industry and its contributions to federal revenues.

S. 559 was introduced in the Senate on January 15, 1965, by Senator Warren G. Magnuson (D-WA), which required cigarette packages to bear the statement: "Warning: Continual Cigarette Smoking May be Hazardous to Your Health." The bill also removed a threat to tobacco interests by prohibiting any other health warning by federal, state, or local entities for a period of time. Representative Walter Rogers (D-TX) introduced H.R. 3014 in the House. It was similar to S. 559; however, instead of a three-year moratorium on federal agency regulation of labeling and advertising, the House bill permanently banned the Federal Trade Commission or other federal agency action concerning health warnings.

The House and Senate were under pressure from both health organizations, which wanted stronger legislation informing the public about the health hazards, and tobacco interests that sought to limit the impact of the proposed warning label. A conference committee resolved differences between the House and Senate bill versions by compromising on a four-year ban of FTC action. On July 6, the Senate adopted the conference report by a voice vote and on July 13, the House adopted the report by a 286 to 103 roll-call vote.

President Lyndon B. Johnson signed the bill into law without comment on July 27, 1965.

== See also ==
- Prevalence of tobacco consumption
- Tobacco advertising
- Tobacco control
- Tobacco packaging warning messages

== External Resources ==
- Federal Cigarette Labeling and Advertising Act as amended (PDF/details) in the GPO Statute Compilations collection
- The Great Society Congress
