= 2007 term United States Supreme Court opinions of John Paul Stevens =

The 2007 term of the Supreme Court of the United States began October 1, 2007, and concluded September 30, 2008. This was the thirty-third term of Associate Justice John Paul Stevens's tenure on the Court.
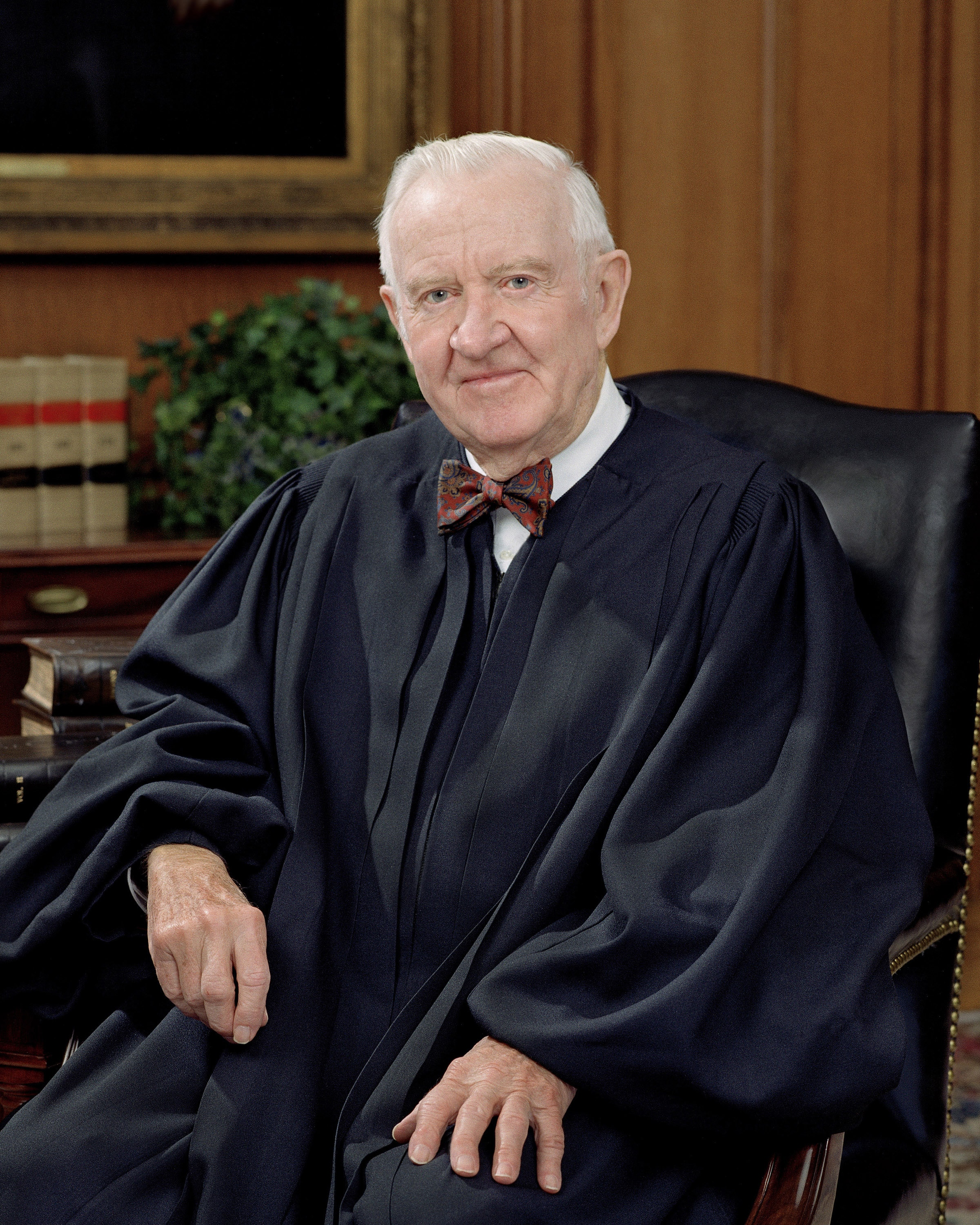

John Paul Stevens 2007 term statistics

7	Majority or plurality	8	Concurrence	3	Other
11	Dissent	4	Concurrence/dissent	Total =	33
Bench opinions = 28		Opinions relating to orders = 5		In-chambers opinions = 0
Unanimous opinions: 0		Most joined by: Souter, Ginsburg (13)		Least joined by: Thomas (4)

Type	Case	Citation	Issues	Joined by	Other opinions
	Allen v. Siebert	552 U.S. 3 (2007)		Ginsburg	per curiam
	Gall v. United States	552 U.S. 38 (2007)		Roberts, Scalia, Kennedy, Souter, Ginsburg, Breyer	Scalia; Souter; Thomas; Alito
	Wright v. Van Patten	552 U.S. 120 (2008)			per curiam
	John R. Sand & Gravel Co. v. United States	552 U.S. 130 (2008)		Ginsburg	Breyer; Ginsburg
	Stoneridge Investment Partners, LLC v. Scientific-Atlanta, Inc.	552 U.S. 148 (2008)		Souter, Ginsburg	Kennedy
	New York State Bd. of Elections v. Lopez Torres	552 U.S. 196 (2008)		Souter	Scalia; Kennedy
	LaRue v. DeWolff, Boberg & Associates, Inc.	552 U.S. 248 (2008)		Souter, Ginsburg, Breyer, Alito	Roberts; Thomas
	Danforth v. Minnesota	552 U.S. 264 (2008)		Scalia, Souter, Thomas, Ginsburg, Breyer, Alito	Roberts
	Riegel v. Medtronic, Inc.	552 U.S. 312 (2008)			Scalia; Ginsburg
	Medellin v. Texas	552 U.S. 491 (2008)			Roberts; Breyer
	Hall Street Associates, L. L. C. v. Mattel, Inc.	552 U.S. 576 (2008)	Federal Arbitration Act	Kennedy	Souter; Breyer
	New Jersey v. Delaware	552 U.S. 597 (2008)			Ginsburg; Scalia
	Emmett v. Kelly	552 U.S. 942 (2007)		Ginsburg	
Stevens filed a statement respecting the denial of certiorari.
	Baze v. Rees	553 U.S. 35 (2008)	Eighth Amendment • death penalty • lethal injection		Roberts; Scalia; Thomas; Breyer; Alito; Ginsburg
	Crawford v. Marion County Election Bd.	553 U.S. 181 (2008)		Roberts, Kennedy	Scalia; Souter; Breyer
	United States v. Ressam	553 U.S. 272 (2008)		Roberts, Kennedy, Souter, Ginsburg, Alito; Scalia, Thomas (in part)	Thomas; Breyer
	United States v. Williams (2008)	553 U.S. 285 (2008)		Breyer	Scalia; Souter
	Department of Revenue of Ky. v. Davis	553 U.S. 328 (2008)			Souter; Roberts; Scalia; Thomas; Kennedy; Alito
	Riley v. Kennedy	553 U.S. 406 (2008)		Souter	Ginsburg
	United States v. Santos	553 U.S. 507 (2008)			Scalia; Breyer; Alito
	Engquist v. Oregon Dept. of Agriculture	553 U.S. 591 (2008)		Souter, Ginsburg	Roberts
	Irizarry v. United States	553 U.S. 708 (2008)		Roberts, Scalia, Thomas, Alito	Thomas; Breyer
	Republic of Philippines v. Pimentel	553 U.S. 851 (2008)			Kennedy; Souter
	Velazquez v. Arizona	553 U.S. 1014 (2008)			
Stevens filed a statement respecting the Court's denial of certiorari, stating that, while he agreed with denial, this did not constitute an opinion on the merits.
	Frazier v. Ohio	553 U.S. 1015 (2008)			
Stevens filed a statement respecting the Court's denial of certiorari, stating that, while he agreed with denial, this did not constitute an opinion on the merits.
	Emmett v. Johnson	553 U.S. 1051 (2008)	death penalty	Souter, Ginsburg	
Stevens dissented from the Court's granting of a motion to vacate a stay of execution of a sentence of death.
	Green v. Johnson	553 U.S. 1076 (2008)	death penalty	Ginsburg	
Stevens dissented from the Court's denial of a stay of execution of sentence of death, and from the Court's denial of certiorari.
	Chamber of Commerce of United States v. Brown	554 U.S. 60 (2008)		Roberts, Scalia, Kennedy, Souter, Thomas, Alito	Breyer
	Exxon Shipping Co. v. Baker	554 U.S. 471 (2008)			Souter; Scalia; Ginsburg; Breyer
	Morgan Stanley Capital Group Inc. v. Public Util. Dist. No. 1 of Snohomish Cty.	554 U.S. 527 (2008)		Souter	Scalia; Ginsburg
	District of Columbia v. Heller	554 U.S. 570 (2008)	Second Amendment	Souter, Ginsburg, Breyer	Scalia; Breyer
	Davis v. Federal Election Comm'n	554 U.S. 724 (2008)	campaign finance reform	Souter, Ginsburg, Breyer (in part)	Alito; Ginsburg
	Medellín v. Texas	554 U.S. 759 (208)	death penalty		per curiam; Souter; Ginsburg; Breyer
Stevens dissented from the Court's per curiam denial of an application for a stay of execution of sentence of death and a petition for a writ of habeas corpus.
