= 2007 term United States Supreme Court opinions of Clarence Thomas =

The 2007 term of the Supreme Court of the United States began October 1, 2007, and concluded September 30, 2008. This was the seventeenth term of Associate Justice Clarence Thomas's tenure on the Court.
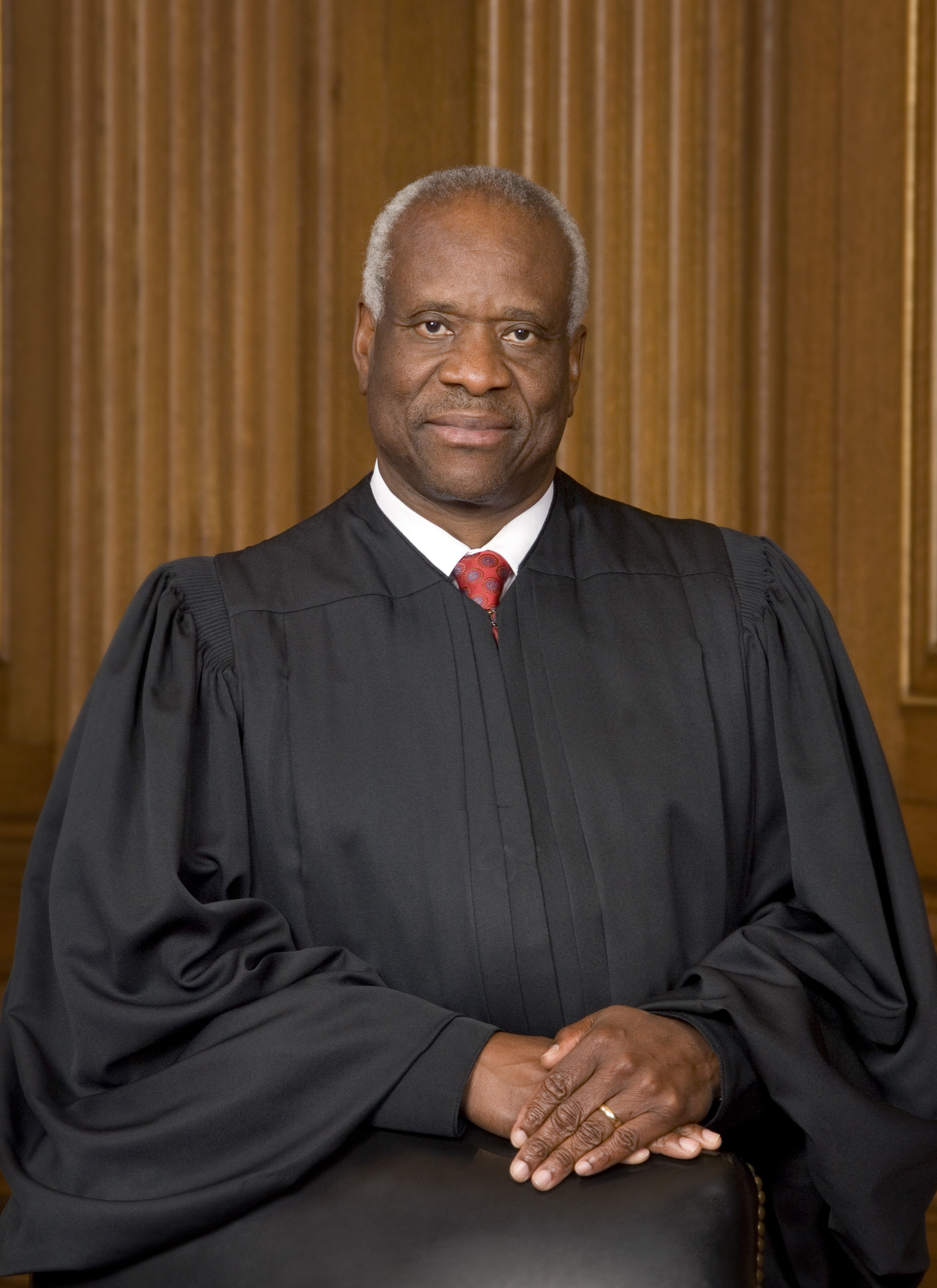

Clarence Thomas 2007 term statistics

7	Majority or plurality	7	Concurrence	0	Other
9	Dissent	1	Concurrence/dissent	Total =	24
Bench opinions = 24		Opinions relating to orders = 0		In-chambers opinions = 0
Unanimous opinions: 4		Most joined by: Scalia (13)		Least joined by: Stevens, Kennedy, Breyer (5)

Type	Case	Citation	Issues	Joined by	Other opinions
	Gall v. United States	552 U.S. 38 (2007)			Stevens; Scalia; Souter; Alito
	Kimbrough v. United States	552 U.S. 85 (2007)			Ginsburg; Scalia; Alito
	Ali v. Federal Bureau of Prisons	552 U.S. 214 (2008)		Roberts, Scalia, Ginsburg, Alito	Kennedy; Breyer
	LaRue v. DeWolff, Boberg & Associates, Inc.	552 U.S. 248 (2008)		Scalia	Stevens; Roberts
	Preston v. Ferrer	552 U.S. 346 (2008)			Ginsburg
	Sprint/United Management Co. v. Mendelsohn	552 U.S. 379 (2008)		Unanimous	
	Federal Express Corp. v. Holowecki	552 U.S. 389 (2008)		Scalia	Kennedy
	Washington State Grange v. Washington State Republican Party	552 U.S. 442 (2008)		Roberts, Stevens, Souter, Ginsburg, Breyer, Alito	Roberts; Scalia
	Snyder v. Louisiana	552 U.S. 472 (2008)		Scalia	Alito
	MeadWestvaco Corp. v. Illinois Dept. of Revenue	553 U.S. 16 (2008)			Alito
	Baze v. Rees	553 U.S. 35 (2008)	Eighth Amendment • death penalty • lethal injection	Scalia	Roberts; Stevens; Scalia; Breyer; Alito; Ginsburg
	Gonzalez v. United States	553 U.S. 242 (2008)			Kennedy; Scalia
	United States v. Ressam	553 U.S. 272 (2008)		Scalia	Stevens; Breyer
	Department of Revenue of Ky. v. Davis	553 U.S. 328 (2008)			Souter; Roberts; Stevens; Scalia; Kennedy; Alito
	CBOCS West, Inc. v. Humphries	553 U.S. 442 (2008)		Scalia	Breyer
	Gomez-Perez v. Potter	553 U.S. 474 (2008)		Scalia	Alito; Roberts
	Regalado Cuellar v. United States	553 U.S. 550 (2008)		Unanimous	Alito
	Quanta Computer, Inc. v. LG Electronics, Inc.	553 U.S. 617 (2008)		Unanimous	
	Bridge v. Phoenix Bond & Indemnity Co.	553 U.S. 639 (2008)		Unanimous	
	Irizarry v. United States	553 U.S. 708 (2008)			Stevens; Breyer
	Florida Dept. of Revenue v. Piccadilly Cafeterias, Inc.	554 U.S. 33 (2008)		Roberts, Scalia, Kennedy, Souter, Ginsburg, Alito	Breyer
	Meacham v. Knolls Atomic Power Laboratory	554 U.S. 84 (2008)			Souter; Scalia
	Rothgery v. Gillespie County	554 U.S. 191 (2008)			Souter; Roberts; Alito
	Giles v. California	554 U.S. 353 (2008)			Scalia; Souter; Alito; Breyer
