= 2007 term United States Supreme Court opinions of Antonin Scalia =

The 2007 term of the Supreme Court of the United States began October 1, 2007, and concluded September 30, 2008. This was the twenty-second term of Associate Justice Antonin Scalia's tenure on the Court.
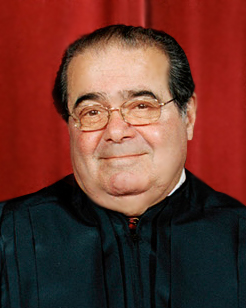

Antonin Scalia 2007 term statistics

8	Majority or plurality	10	Concurrence	1	Other
9	Dissent	0	Concurrence/dissent	Total =	28
Bench opinions = 24		Opinions relating to orders = 4		In-chambers opinions = 0
Unanimous opinions: 0		Most joined by: Thomas (17)		Least joined by: Ginsburg (3)

Type	Case	Citation	Issues	Joined by	Other opinions
	Gall v. United States	552 U.S. 38 (2007)			Stevens; Souter; Thomas; Alito
	Kimbrough v. United States	552 U.S. 85 (2007)			Ginsburg; Thomas; Alito
	New York State Bd. of Elections v. Lopez Torres	552 U.S. 196 (2008)		Roberts, Stevens, Souter, Thomas, Ginsburg, Breyer, Alito	Stevens; Kennedy
	Riegel v. Medtronic, Inc.	552 U.S. 312 (2008)		Roberts, Kennedy, Souter, Thomas, Breyer, Alito; Stevens (in part)	Stevens; Ginsburg
	Rowe v. New Hampshire Motor Transp. Assn.	552 U.S. 364 (2008)			Breyer; Ginsburg
	Washington State Grange v. Washington State Republican Party	552 U.S. 442 (2008)		Kennedy	Thomas; Roberts
	New Jersey v. Delaware	552 U.S. 597 (2008)		Alito	Ginsburg; Stevens
	Norris v. Jones	552 U.S. 986 (2007)	Death penalty		
Scalia dissented from the Court's denial of an application to vacate a stay of execution.
	Baze v. Rees	553 U.S. 35 (2008)	Eighth Amendment • death penalty • lethal injection	Thomas	Roberts; Stevens; Thomas; Breyer; Alito; Ginsburg
	Begay v. United States	553 U.S. 137 (2008)			Breyer; Alito
	Virginia v. Moore	553 U.S. 164 (2008)	Fourth Amendment	Roberts, Stevens, Kennedy, Souter, Thomas, Breyer, Alito	Ginsburg
	Crawford v. Marion County Election Bd.	553 U.S. 181 (2008)		Thomas, Alito	Stevens; Souter; Breyer
	Gonzalez v. United States	553 U.S. 242 (2008)			Kennedy; Thomas
	United States v. Williams (2008)	553 U.S. 285 (2008)		Roberts, Stevens, Kennedy, Thomas, Breyer, Alito	Stevens; Souter
	Department of Revenue of Ky. v. Davis	553 U.S. 328 (2008)			Souter; Roberts; Stevens; Thomas; Kennedy; Alito
	United States v. Santos	553 U.S. 507 (2008)		Souter, Ginsburg; Thomas (in part)	Stevens; Breyer; Alito
	Boumediene v. Bush	553 U.S. 723 (2008)		Roberts, Thomas, Alito	Kennedy; Souter; Roberts
	Dada v. Mukasey	554 U.S. 1 (2008)		Roberts, Thomas	Kennedy; Alito
	Meacham v. Knolls Atomic Power Laboratory	554 U.S. 84 (2008)			Souter; Thomas
	Metropolitan Life Ins. Co. v. Glenn	554 U.S. 105 (2008)		Thomas	Breyer; Roberts; Kennedy
	Indiana v. Edwards	554 U.S. 164 (2008)		Thomas	Breyer
	Giles v. California	554 U.S. 353 (2008)		Roberts, Thomas, Alito; Souter, Ginsburg (in part)	Souter; Thomas; Alito; Breyer
	Exxon Shipping Co. v. Baker	554 U.S. 471 (2008)	maritime law • punitive damages	Thomas	Souter; Stevens; Ginsburg; Breyer
	Morgan Stanley Capital Group Inc. v. Public Util. Dist. No. 1 of Snohomish Cty.	554 U.S. 527 (2008)		Kennedy, Thomas, Alito; Breyer (in part)	Ginsburg; Stevens
	District of Columbia v. Heller	554 U.S. 570 (2008)	Second Amendment • prohibition on handgun ownership	Roberts, Kennedy, Thomas, Alito	Stevens; Breyer
	Nunez v. United States	554 U.S. 911 (2008)		Roberts, Thomas	
Scalia dissented from the Court's granting of certiorari.
	Stephenson v. United States	554 U.S. 913 (2008)		Roberts, Thomas	
Scalia dissented from the Court's granting of certiorari.
	Kennedy v. Louisiana	554 U.S. 945 (2008)	death penalty	Roberts	Kennedy
Scalia filed a statement respecting the Court's denial of rehearing.
