= 2007 term United States Supreme Court opinions of Stephen Breyer =

The 2007 term of the Supreme Court of the United States began October 1, 2007, and concluded September 30, 2008. This was the fourteenth term of Associate Justice Stephen Breyer's tenure on the Court.
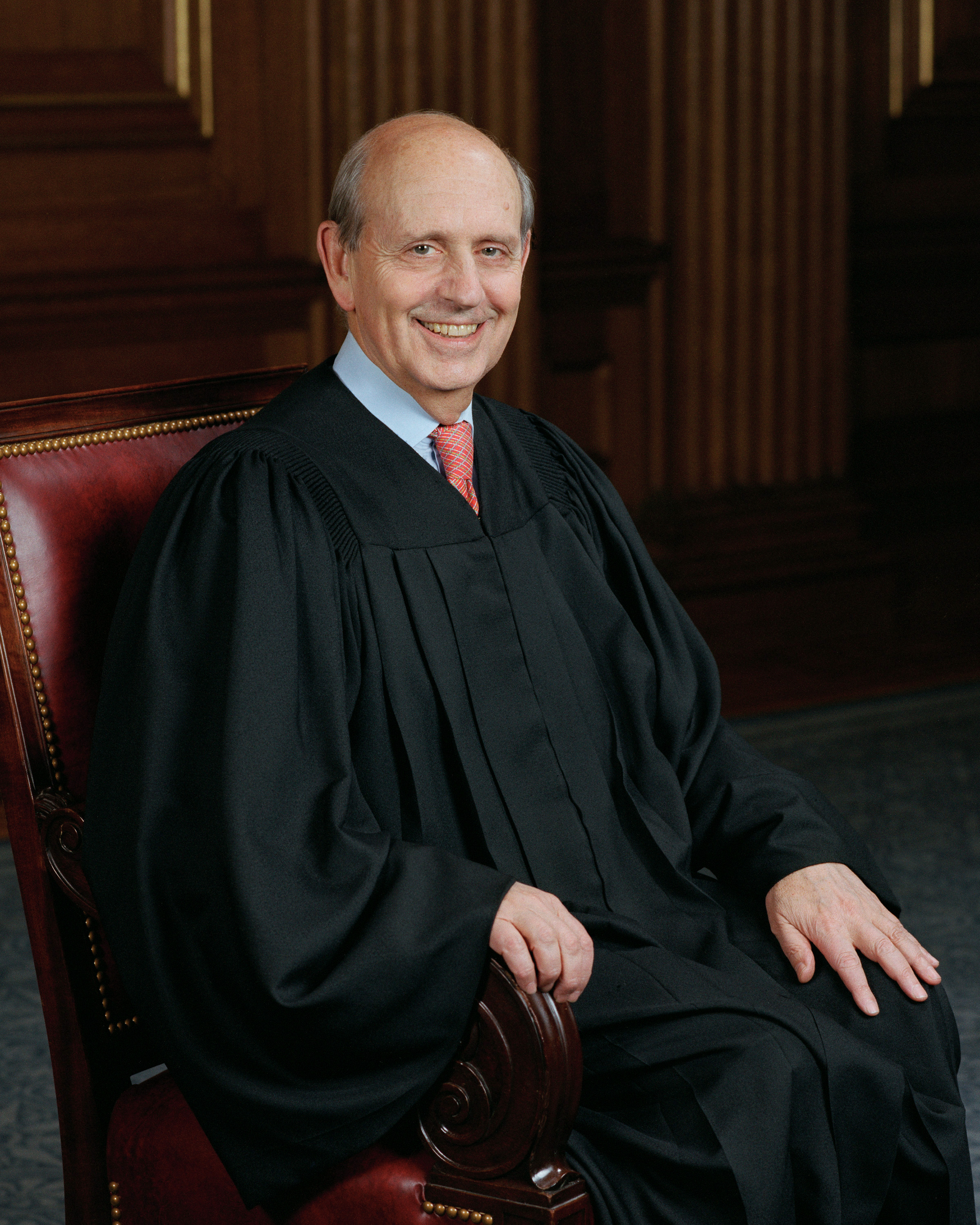

Stephen Breyer 2007 term statistics

8	Majority or plurality	2	Concurrence	0	Other
13	Dissent	1	Concurrence/dissent	Total =	24
Bench opinions = 23		Opinions relating to orders = 1		In-chambers opinions = 0
Unanimous opinions: 0		Most joined by: Stevens (10)		Least joined by: Scalia (2)

Type	Case	Citation	Issues	Joined by	Other opinions
	John R. Sand & Gravel Co. v. United States	552 U.S. 130 (2008)		Roberts, Scalia, Kennedy, Souter, Thomas, Alito	Stevens; Ginsburg
	Ali v. Federal Bureau of Prisons	552 U.S. 214 (2008)		Stevens	Thomas; Kennedy
	Rowe v. New Hampshire Motor Transp. Assn.	552 U.S. 364 (2008)		Roberts, Stevens, Kennedy, Souter, Thomas, Alito; Scalia (in part)	Scalia; Ginsburg
	Medellin v. Texas	552 U.S. 491 (2008)		Souter, Ginsburg	Roberts; Stevens
	Hall Street Associates, L. L. C. v. Mattel, Inc.	552 U.S. 576 (2008)	Federal Arbitration Act		Souter; Stevens
	Smith v. Arizona	552 U.S. 985 (2007)			
Breyer dissented from the Court's denial of certiorari.
	Baze v. Rees	553 U.S. 35 (2008)	Eighth Amendment • death penalty • lethal injection		Roberts; Stevens; Scalia; Thomas; Alito; Ginsburg
	Begay v. United States	553 U.S. 137 (2008)		Roberts, Stevens, Kennedy, Ginsburg	Scalia; Alito
	Crawford v. Marion County Election Bd.	553 U.S. 181 (2008)			Stevens; Scalia; Souter
	United States v. Ressam	553 U.S. 272 (2008)			Stevens; Thomas
	CBOCS West, Inc. v. Humphries	553 U.S. 442 (2008)		Roberts, Stevens, Kennedy, Souter, Ginsburg, Alito	Thomas
	United States v. Santos	553 U.S. 507 (2008)			Scalia; Stevens; Alito
	Irizarry v. United States	553 U.S. 708 (2008)		Kennedy, Souter, Ginsburg	Stevens; Thomas
	Florida Dept. of Revenue v. Piccadilly Cafeterias, Inc.	554 U.S. 33 (2008)		Stevens	Thomas
	Chamber of Commerce of United States v. Brown	554 U.S. 60 (2008)		Ginsburg	Stevens
	Metropolitan Life Ins. Co. v. Glenn	554 U.S. 105 (2008)		Stevens, Souter, Ginsburg, Alito; Roberts (in part)	Roberts; Kennedy; Scalia
	Kentucky Retirement Systems v. EEOC	554 U.S. 135 (2008)		Roberts, Stevens, Souter, Thomas	Kennedy
	Indiana v. Edwards	554 U.S. 164 (2008)		Roberts, Stevens, Kennedy, Souter, Ginsburg, Alito	Scalia
	Greenlaw v. United States	554 U.S. 237 (2008)			Ginsburg; Alito
	Sprint Communications Co. v. APCC Services, Inc.	554 U.S. 269 (2008)		Stevens, Kennedy, Souter, Ginsburg	Roberts
	Giles v. California	554 U.S. 353 (2008)		Stevens, Kennedy	Scalia; Souter; Thomas; Alito
	Exxon Shipping Co. v. Baker	554 U.S. 471 (2008)	maritime law • punitive damages		Souter; Scalia; Stevens; Ginsburg
	District of Columbia v. Heller	554 U.S. 570 (2008)	Second Amendment • prohibition on handgun ownership	Stevens, Souter, Ginsburg	Scalia; Stevens
	Medellín v. Texas	554 U.S. 759 (2008)	death penalty		per curiam; Stevens; Souter; Ginsburg
Breyer dissented from the Court's per curiam denial of an application for a stay of execution of sentence of death and a petition for a writ of habeas corpus.
