= 2007 term United States Supreme Court opinions of Samuel Alito =

The 2007 term of the Supreme Court of the United States began October 1, 2007, and concluded September 30, 2008. This was the third term of Associate Justice Samuel Alito's tenure on the Court.
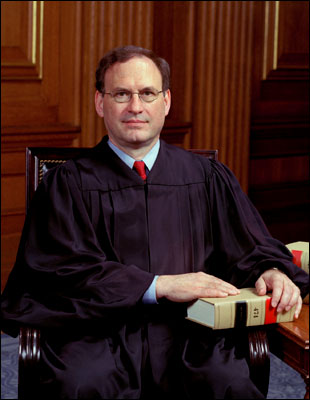

Samuel Alito 2007 term statistics

7	Majority or plurality	4	Concurrence	0	Other
8	Dissent	0	Concurrence/dissent	Total =	19
Bench opinions = 19		Opinions relating to orders = 0		In-chambers opinions = 0
Unanimous opinions: 2		Most joined by: Roberts (10)		Least joined by: Ginsburg (6)

Type	Case	Citation	Issues	Joined by	Other opinions
	Gall v. United States	552 U.S. 38 (2007)			Stevens; Scalia; Souter; Thomas
	Kimbrough v. United States	552 U.S. 85 (2007)			Ginsburg; Scalia; Thomas
	Snyder v. Louisiana	552 U.S. 472 (2007)		Roberts, Stevens, Kennedy, Souter, Ginsburg, Breyer	Thomas
	MeadWestvaco Corp. v. Illinois Dept. of Revenue	553 U.S. 16 (2008)		Unanimous	Thomas
	Baze v. Rees	553 U.S. 35 (2008)	Eighth Amendment • death penalty • lethal injection		Roberts; Stevens; Scalia; Thomas; Breyer; Ginsburg
	Begay v. United States	553 U.S. 137 (2008)			Breyer; Scalia
	Department of Revenue of Ky. v. Davis	553 U.S. 328 (2008)			Souter; Roberts; Stevens; Scalia; Thomas; Kennedy
	United States v. Rodriquez	553 U.S. 377 (2008)	Armed Career Criminal Act	Roberts, Scalia, Kennedy, Thomas, Breyer	Souter
	Gomez-Perez v. Potter	553 U.S. 474 (2008)		Stevens, Kennedy, Souter, Ginsburg, Breyer	Roberts; Thomas
	United States v. Santos	553 U.S. 507 (2008)		Roberts, Kennedy, Breyer	Scalia; Stevens; Breyer
	Regalado Cuellar v. United States	553 U.S. 550 (2008)		Roberts, Kennedy	Thomas
	Richlin Security Service Co. v. Chertoff	553 U.S. 571 (2008)		Roberts, Stevens, Kennedy, Souter, Ginsburg, Breyer; Scalia, Thomas (in part)	
	Allison Engine Co. v. United States ex rel. Sanders	553 U.S. 662 (2008)		Unanimous	
	Dada v. Mukasey	554 U.S. 1 (2008)			Kennedy; Scalia
	Rothgery v. Gillespie County	554 U.S. 191 (2008)		Roberts, Scalia	Souter; Roberts; Thomas
	Greenlaw v. United States	554 U.S. 237 (2008)		Stevens; Breyer (in part)	Ginsburg; Breyer
	Giles v. California	554 U.S. 353 (2008)			Scalia; Souter; Thomas; Breyer
	Kennedy v. Louisiana	554 U.S. 407 (2008)	Eighth Amendment • death penalty	Roberts, Scalia, Thomas	Kennedy
	Davis v. Federal Election Comm'n	554 U.S. 724 (2008)	campaign finance reform	Roberts, Scalia, Kennedy, Thomas; Stevens, Souter, Ginsburg, Breyer (in part)	Stevens; Ginsburg
