= 2007 term United States Supreme Court opinions of Ruth Bader Ginsburg =

The 2007 term of the Supreme Court of the United States began October 1, 2007, and concluded September 30, 2008. This was the fifteenth term of Associate Justice Ruth Bader Ginsburg's tenure on the Court.
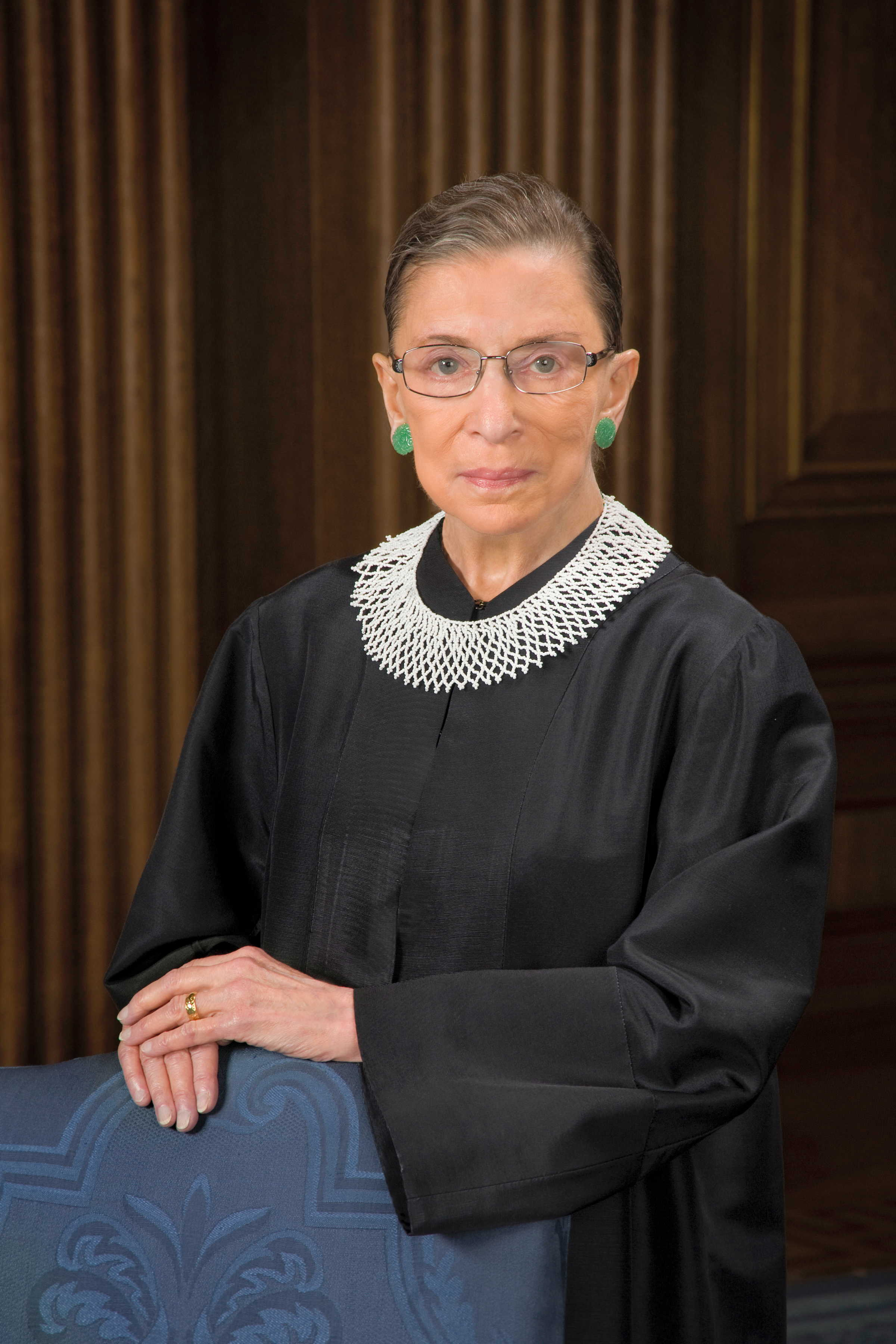

Ruth Bader Ginsburg 2007 term statistics

| 8 | Majority or plurality | 4 | Concurrence | 0 | Other |
| 4 | Dissent | 3 | Concurrence/dissent | Total = | 19 |
| Bench opinions = 19 | | Opinions relating to orders = 0 | | In-chambers opinions = 0 |
| Unanimous opinions: 3 | | Most joined by: Souter (9) | | Least joined by: Thomas (6) |

| Type | Case | Citation | Issues | Joined by | Other opinions |
|---|---|---|---|---|---|
| | Logan v. United States | 552 U.S. 23 (2007) | | Unanimous | |
| | Watson v. United States | 552 U.S. 74 (2007) | | | Souter |
| | Kimbrough v. United States | 552 U.S. 85 (2007) | | Roberts, Stevens, Scalia, Kennedy, Souter, Breyer | Scalia; Thomas; Alito |
| | John R. Sand & Gravel Co. v. United States | 552 U.S. 130 (2008) | | | Breyer; Stevens |
| | Riegel v. Medtronic, Inc. | 552 U.S. 312 (2008) | | | Scalia; Stevens |
| | Preston v. Ferrer | 552 U.S. 346 (2008) | | Roberts, Stevens, Scalia, Kennedy, Souter, Breyer, Alito | Thomas |
| | Rowe v. New Hampshire Motor Transp. Assn. | 552 U.S. 364 (2008) | | | Breyer; Scalia |
| | New Jersey v. Delaware | 552 U.S. 597 (2008) | original jurisdiction • border dispute | Roberts, Kennedy, Souter, Thomas; Stevens (in part) | Stevens; Scalia |
| | Baze v. Rees | 553 U.S. 35 (2008) | Eighth Amendment • death penalty • lethal injection | Souter | Roberts; Stevens; Scalia; Thomas; Breyer; Alito |
| | Burgess v. United States | 553 U.S. 124 (2008) | | Unanimous | |
| | Virginia v. Moore | 553 U.S. 164 (2008) | Fourth Amendment | | Scalia |
| | Riley v. Kennedy | 553 U.S. 406 (2008) | | Roberts, Scalia, Kennedy, Thomas, Breyer, Alito | Stevens |
| | Taylor v. Sturgell | 553 U.S. 880 (2008) | | Unanimous | |
| | Greenlaw v. United States | 554 U.S. 237 (2008) | | Roberts, Scalia, Kennedy, Souter, Thomas | Breyer; Alito |
| | Plains Commerce Bank v. Long Family Land and Cattle Co., Inc. | 554 U.S. 316 (2008) | | Stevens, Souter, Ginsburg | Roberts |
| | Exxon Shipping Co. v. Baker | 554 U.S. 471 (2008) | Due Process Clause • punitive damages | | Souter; Scalia; Stevens; Breyer |
| | Morgan Stanley Capital Group Inc. v. Public Util. Dist. No. 1 of Snohomish Cty. | 554 U.S. 527 (2008) | | | Scalia; Stevens |
| | Davis v. Federal Election Comm'n | 554 U.S. 724 (2008) | campaign finance reform | Breyer | Alito; Stevens |
| | Medellín v. Texas | 554 U.S. 759 (208) | death penalty | | per curiam; Stevens; Souter; Breyer |
Ginsburg dissented from the Court's per curiam denial of an application for a stay of execution of sentence of death and a petition for a writ of habeas corpus.
