= 2007 term United States Supreme Court opinions of David Souter =

The 2007 term of the Supreme Court of the United States began October 1, 2007, and concluded September 30, 2008. This was the eighteenth term of Associate Justice David Souter's tenure on the Court.
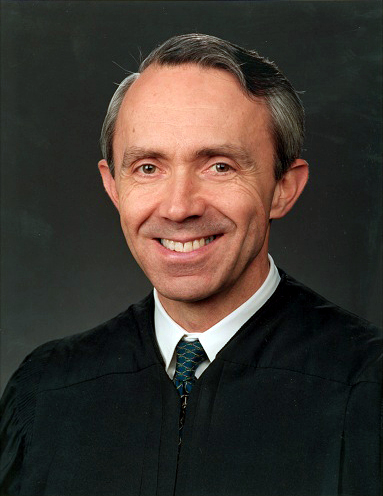

David Souter 2007 term statistics

7	Majority or plurality	4	Concurrence	0	Other
4	Dissent	1	Concurrence/dissent	Total =	16
Bench opinions = 16		Opinions relating to orders = 0		In-chambers opinions = 0
Unanimous opinions: 1		Most joined by: Ginsburg (11)		Least joined by: Kennedy, Thomas, Alito (5)

Type	Case	Citation	Issues	Joined by	Other opinions
	Gall v. United States	552 U.S. 38 (2007)			Stevens; Scalia; Thomas; Alito
	Watson v. United States	552 U.S. 74 (2007)		Roberts, Stevens, Scalia, Kennedy, Thomas, Breyer, Alito	Ginsburg
	Boulware v. United States	552 U.S. 421 (2008)		Unanimous	
	Hall Street Associates, L. L. C. v. Mattel, Inc.	552 U.S. 576 (2008)	Federal Arbitration Act	Roberts, Thomas, Ginsburg, Alito; Scalia (in part)	Stevens; Breyer
	Crawford v. Marion County Election Bd.	553 U.S. 181 (2008)		Ginsburg	Stevens; Scalia; Breyer
	United States v. Williams (2008)	553 U.S. 285 (2008)		Ginsburg	Scalia; Stevens
	Department of Revenue of Ky. v. Davis	553 U.S. 328 (2008)		Stevens, Breyer; Roberts, Scalia, Ginsburg (in part)	Roberts; Stevens; Scalia; Thomas; Kennedy; Alito
	United States v. Rodriquez	553 U.S. 377 (2008)		Stevens, Ginsburg	Alito
	Munaf v. Geren	553 U.S. 674 (2008)		Ginsburg, Breyer	Roberts
	Boumediene v. Bush	553 U.S. 723 (2008)		Ginsburg, Breyer	Kennedy; Roberts; Scalia
	Republic of Philippines v. Pimentel	553 U.S. 553 (2008)			Kennedy; Stevens
	Meacham v. Knolls Atomic Power Laboratory	554 U.S. 84 (2008)		Roberts, Stevens, Kennedy, Ginsburg, Alito; Thomas (in part)	Scalia; Thomas
	Rothgery v. Gillespie County	554 U.S. 191 (2008)		Roberts, Stevens, Scalia, Kennedy, Ginsburg, Breyer, Alito	Roberts; Alito; Thomas
	Giles v. California	554 U.S. 353 (2008)		Ginsburg	Scalia; Thomas; Alito; Breyer
	Exxon Shipping Co. v. Baker	554 U.S. 471 (2008)	Due Process Clause • punitive damages	Roberts, Scalia, Kennedy, Thomas; Stevens, Ginsburg, Breyer (in part)	Scalia; Stevens; Ginsburg; Breyer
	Medellín v. Texas	554 U.S. 759 (208)	death penalty		per curiam; Stevens; Ginsburg; Breyer
Souter dissented from the Court's per curiam denial of an application for a stay of execution of sentence of death and a petition for a writ of habeas corpus.
