= 2007 term United States Supreme Court opinions of Anthony Kennedy =

The 2007 term of the Supreme Court of the United States began October 1, 2007, and concluded September 30, 2008. This was the twenty-first term of Associate Justice Anthony Kennedy's tenure on the Court.
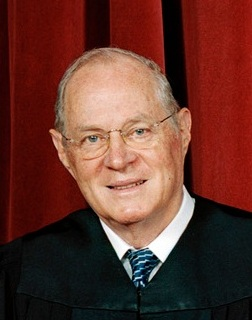

Anthony Kennedy 2007 term statistics

7	Majority or plurality	1	Concurrence	1	Other
3	Dissent	1	Concurrence/dissent	Total =	13
Bench opinions = 12		Opinions relating to orders = 1		In-chambers opinions = 0
Unanimous opinions: 0		Most joined by: Breyer (9)		Least joined by: Thomas (2)

Type	Case	Citation	Issues	Joined by	Other opinions
	Stoneridge Investment Partners, LLC v. Scientific-Atlanta, Inc.	552 U.S. 148 (2007)		Roberts, Scalia, Thomas, Alito	Stevens
	New York State Bd. of Elections v. Lopez Torres	552 U.S. 196 (2008)		Breyer (in part)	Scalia; Stevens
	Ali v. Federal Bureau of Prisons	552 U.S. 214 (2008)		Stevens, Souter, Breyer	Thomas; Breyer
	Federal Express Corp. v. Holowecki	552 U.S. 389 (2008)		Roberts, Stevens, Souter, Ginsburg, Breyer, Alito	Thomas
	Gonzalez v. United States	553 U.S. 242 (2008)		Roberts, Stevens, Souter, Ginsburg, Breyer, Alito	Scalia; Thomas
	Department of Revenue of Ky. v. Davis	553 U.S. 328 (2008)		Alito	Souter; Roberts; Stevens; Scalia; Thomas; Alito
	Boumediene v. Bush	553 U.S. 723 (2008)		Stevens, Souter, Ginsburg, Breyer	Souter; Roberts; Scalia
	Republic of Philippines v. Pimentel	553 U.S. 851 (2008)		Roberts, Scalia, Thomas, Ginsburg, Breyer, Alito; Stevens, Souter (in part)	Stevens; Souter
	Dada v. Mukasey	554 U.S. 1 (2008)		Stevens, Souter, Ginsburg, Breyer	Scalia; Alito
	Metropolitan Life Ins. Co. v. Glenn	554 U.S. 105 (2008)			Breyer; Roberts; Scalia
	Kentucky Retirement Systems v. EEOC	554 U.S. 135 (2008)		Scalia, Ginsburg, Alito	Breyer
	Kennedy v. Louisiana	554 U.S. 407 (2008)	Death penalty	Stevens, Souter, Ginsburg, Breyer	Alito
	Kennedy v. Louisiana	554 U.S. 945 (2008)	Death penalty	Stevens, Souter, Ginsburg, Breyer	Scalia
Kennedy filed a statement respecting the Court's denial of rehearing.
