= 2007 term United States Supreme Court opinions of John Roberts =

The 2007 term of the Supreme Court of the United States began October 1, 2007, and concluded September 30, 2008. This was the third term of Chief Justice John Roberts's tenure on the Court.
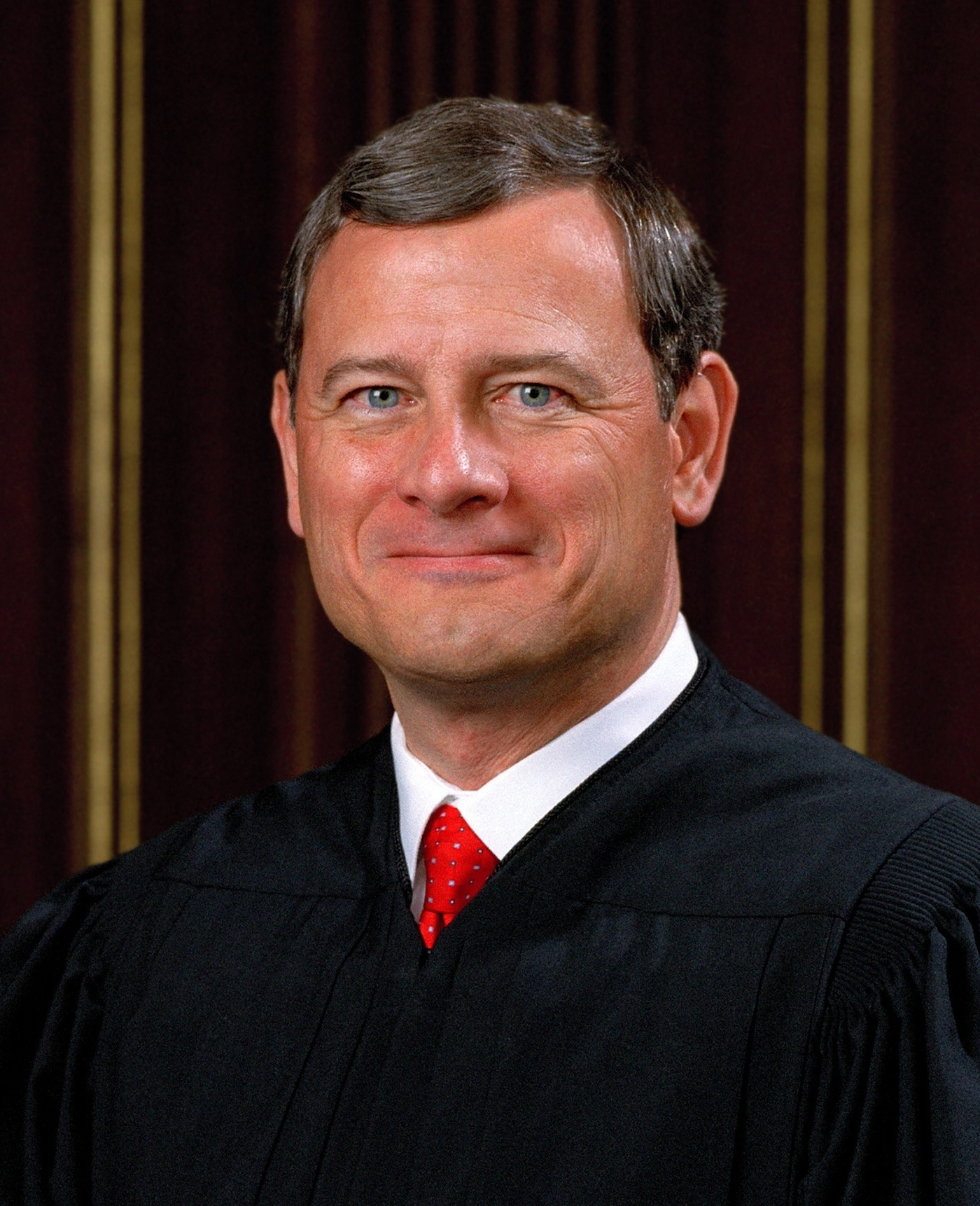

John Roberts 2007 term statistics

| 8 | Majority or plurality | 5 | Concurrence | 0 | Other |
| 4 | Dissent | 0 | Concurrence/dissent | Total = | 17 |
| Bench opinions = 17 | | Opinions relating to orders = 0 | | In-chambers opinions = 0 |
| Unanimous opinions: 4 | | Most joined by: Scalia, Alito (11) | | Least joined by: Stevens, Souter, Ginsburg (5) |

| Type | Case | Citation | Issues | Joined by | Other opinions |
|---|---|---|---|---|---|
| | CSX Transp., Inc. v. Georgia State Bd. of Equalization | 552 U.S. 9 (2007) | | Unanimous | |
| | Knight v. Commissioner | 552 U.S. 181 (2008) | | Unanimous | |
| | LaRue v. DeWolff, Boberg & Associates, Inc. | 552 U.S. 248 (2008) | | | Stevens; Thomas |
| | Danforth v. Minnesota | 552 U.S. 264 (2008) | | Kennedy | Stevens |
| | Washington State Grange v. Washington State Republican Party | 552 U.S. 442 (2008) | | Alito | Thomas; Scalia |
| | Medellin v. Texas | 552 U.S. 491 (2008) | | Scalia, Kennedy, Thomas, Alito | Stevens; Breyer |
| | United States v. Clintwood Elkhorn Mining Co. | 553 U.S. 1 (2008) | | Unanimous | |
| | Baze v. Rees | 553 U.S. 35 (2008) | | Kennedy, Alito | Stevens; Scalia; Thomas; Breyer; Alito; Ginsburg |
| | Department of Revenue of Kentucky v. Davis | 553 U.S. 328 (2008) | | | Souter; Stevens; Scalia; Thomas; Kennedy; Alito |
| | Gomez-Perez v. Potter | 553 U.S. 474 (2008) | | Scalia, Thomas (in part) | Alito; Thomas |
| | Engquist v. Oregon Dept. of Agriculture | 553 U.S. 591 (2008) | | Scalia, Kennedy, Thomas, Breyer, Alito | Stevens |
| | Munaf v. Geren | 553 U.S. 674 (2008) | | Unanimous | Souter |
| | Boumediene v. Bush | 553 U.S. 723 (2008) | | Scalia, Thomas, Alito | Kennedy; Souter; Scalia |
| | Metropolitan Life Ins. Co. v. Glenn | 554 U.S. 105 (2008) | | | Breyer; Kennedy; Scalia |
| | Rothgery v. Gillespie County | 554 U.S. 191 (2008) | | Scalia | Souter; Alito; Thomas |
| | Sprint Communications Co. v. APCC Services, Inc. | 554 U.S. 269 (2008) | | Scalia, Thomas, Alito | Breyer |
| | Plains Commerce Bank v. Long Family Land and Cattle Co., Inc. | 554 U.S. 316 (2008) | | Scalia, Kennedy, Thomas, Alito; Stevens, Souter, Ginsburg, Breyer (in part) | Ginsburg |
