= List of United States Supreme Court cases, volume 554 =

This is a list of all the United States Supreme Court cases from volume 554 of the United States Reports:

| Case name | Citation | Date decided |
|---|---|---|
| Dada v. Mukasey | 554 U.S. 1 | 2008 |
A non-citizen must be permitted an opportunity to withdraw a motion for voluntary departure, provided the request is made before expiration of the departure period.
| Fla. Dept. of Revenue v. Piccadilly Cafeterias, Inc. | 554 U.S. 33 | 2008 |
The Bankruptcy Code's section authorizing an exemption from stamp taxes can only be used in relation to a Chapter 11 plan that has been confirmed.
| Chamber of Com. v. Brown | 554 U.S. 60 | 2008 |
The NLRA preempts state labor regulations of noncoercive speech created on the theory that noncoercive speech interferes with employees' right to join a union because the NLRA takes the opposite policy position.
| Meacham v. Knolls Atomic Power Laboratory | 554 U.S. 84 | 2008 |
An employer bears both the burden of production and burden of persuasion when defending a disparate impact claim using the "reasonable factors" defense under the Age Discrimination in Employment Act of 1967.
| Metro. Life Ins. Co. v. Glenn | 554 U.S. 105 | 2008 |
A company that both administers and funds a benefit plan operates under a conflict of interest that must be considered when a court reviews its claim denials.
| Ky. Retirement Systems v. EEOC | 554 U.S. 135 | 2008 |
A retirement system that uses age as an explicit factor in determining benefits is not engaged in prohibited age discrimination when the factor is meant to distinguish pension status and was not actually motivated by bias against older workers.
| Indiana v. Edwards | 554 U.S. 164 | 2008 |
A criminal defendant who is competent to stand trial may nevertheless be found incompetent to represent himself at that trial.
| Rothgery v. Gillespie Cnty. | 554 U.S. 191 | 2008 |
A criminal defendant’s initial appearance before a magistrate judge, where he learns the charge against him and his liberty is subject to restriction, marks the initiation of adversary judicial proceedings that trigger attachment of the Sixth Amendment right to counsel. Attachment does not also require that a prosecutor (as distinct from a police officer) be aware of that initial proceeding or involved in its conduct.
| Greenlaw v. United States | 554 U.S. 237 | 2008 |
A federal appeals court may not sua sponte increase a criminal sentence in the absence of an appeal filed by the government.
| Sprint Communications Co. v. APCC Services, Inc. | 554 U.S. 269 | 2008 |
An assignee of a legal claim for money owed has standing to pursue that claim in federal court even when the assignee has promised to remit the proceeds of the litigation to the assignor.
| Plains Com. Bank v. Long Family Land & Cattle Co., Inc. | 554 U.S. 316 | 2008 |
A tribal court had no jurisdiction to hear a case on the sale of non-Indian fee land located on a reservation.
| Giles v. California | 554 U.S. 353 | 2008 |
For statements to be admitted under the forfeiture exception to the confrontation right, the defendant must have intended to make the witness unavailable for trial.
| Kennedy v. Louisiana | 554 U.S. 407 | 2008 |
It is unconstitutional to impose the death penalty for a crime where the victim did not die and the victim's death was not intended.
| Exxon Shipping Co. v. Baker | 554 U.S. 471 | 2008 |
No more than a one-to-one ratio between compensatory and punitive damages is generally appropriate in maritime cases, absent intentional wrongdoing.
| Morgan Stanley Capital Group Inc. v. Pub. Util. Dist. | 554 U.S. 527 | 2008 |
The Mobile–Sierra presumption that a negotiated rate is "just and reasonable" applies to all contract rates even if it was not actually reviewed for reasonableness, and the presumption applies regardless of whether the rate is considered too high or too low.
| District of Columbia v. Heller | 554 U.S. 570 | 2008 |
The Second Amendment protects an individual right to possess a firearm unconnected with service in a militia, and to use that arm for traditionally lawful purposes, such as self-defense within the home.
| Davis v. FEC | 554 U.S. 724 | 2008 |
Limitations on financial contributions to political campaigns of candidates whose opponents are self-funding their own campaigns may not be raised beyond whatever their opponents can legally contribute. Section 319 of the Bipartisan Campaign Reform Act of 2002 violated the Free Speech Clause of the First Amendment.
| Medellín v. Texas | 554 U.S. 759 | August 5, 2008 |
Neither Case Concerning Avena and Other Mexican Nationals (Mex. v. U.S.), 2004 I.C.J. 12, nor the President's Memorandum to the Attorney General (Feb. 28, 2005) constitutes an enforceable federal law that pre-empts state limitations on the filing of habeas corpus petitions.
