= MeadWestvaco Corp. v. Illinois Department of Revenue =

MeadWestvaco Corp. v. Illinois Dept. of Revenue
- Supreme Court of the United States

Argued January 16, 2008 Decided April 15, 2008
- Full case name: MeadWestvaco Corp., Successor in Interest to Mead Corp. v. Illinois Department of Revenue, et al.
- Docket no.: 06-1413
- Citations: 553 U.S. 16 (more) 128 S. Ct. 1498; 170 L. Ed. 2d 404

Case history
- Prior: Certiorari to the Appellate Court of Illinois, First District

Holding
- The state courts erred in considering whether Lexis served an "operational purpose" in Mead's business after determining that Lexis and Mead were not unitary.

Court membership
- Chief Justice John Roberts Associate Justices John P. Stevens · Antonin Scalia; Anthony Kennedy · David Souter; Clarence Thomas · Ruth Bader Ginsburg; Stephen Breyer · Samuel Alito

Case opinions
- Majority: Alito, joined by unanimous court
- Concurrence: Thomas

MeadWestvaco Corp. v. Illinois Dept. of Revenue, 553 U.S. 16 (2008), is a United States Supreme Court case concerning the extent a state may tax companies that are not based in their state.

== Background ==
Mead, a corporation based out of Ohio, owned Lexis-Nexis, which was based out of Illinois. Mead sold Lexis, and Illinois maintained that Mead must pay them a proportionate capital-gains tax. Illinois asserted that Mead and Lexis were integrated to the extent required for the "unitary business rule". This rule allowed states to tax a proportionate share of the value generated by an interstate corporation.

== Opinion of the Court ==
In a unanimous opinion written by Associate Justice Samuel Alito, the Supreme Court held that the two businesses were not integrated enough to be considered a "unitary business" and Illinois was not allowed to tax Mead on the Lexis sale.
