= CBOCS West, Inc. v. Humphries =

CBOCS West v. Humphries
- Supreme Court of the United States

Argued February 20, 2008 Decided June 30, 2008
- Full case name: CBOCS West, Inc., v. Hedrick G. Humphries
- Docket no.: 06-1431
- Citations: 553 U.S. 442 (more) 128 S. Ct. 1951; 170 L. Ed. 2d 864

Holding
- 42 U.S.C. §1981 encompasses retaliation claims based on racial employment discrimination.

Court membership
- Chief Justice John Roberts Associate Justices John P. Stevens · Antonin Scalia; Anthony Kennedy · David Souter; Clarence Thomas · Ruth Bader Ginsburg; Stephen Breyer · Samuel Alito

Case opinions
- Majority: Breyer, joined by Roberts, Stevens, Kennedy, Souter, Ginsburg, Alito
- Dissent: Thomas, joined by Scalia

Laws applied
- Civil Rights Act of 1866

CBOCS West, Inc., v. Hedrick G. Humphries, 553 U.S. 442 (2008), is a United States Supreme Court case in which the Court ruled that the petitioner, Hedrick Humphries, was unfairly retaliated against by CBOCS West Inc. for complaining to managers about the dismissal of another black employee for race reasons. The court found that CBOCS West Inc. had violated the Civil Rights Act of 1871 and the Civil Rights Act of 1964.

== Background ==
Hendrick Humpries was a mid-level manager for a Cracker Barrel restaurant, which is owned by CBOCS West Inc. Humphries was fired from his job at Cracker Barrel for speaking out over another Black coworker being fired for his race. He originally filed under Title VII of the Civil Rights Act of 1964 and 42 U.S.C. § 1981. However Title VII claims first must be made to the U.S. Equal Opportunity Employment Commission and that part of the case was dismissed by the United States District Court for the Northern District of Illinois. Humphries appealed to the United States Court of Appeals for the Seventh Circuit, which reversed the earlier decision and ordered a trial. The trial held that CBOCS did indeed violate Title VII and U.S.C. § 1981. CBOCS then filed a petition for a writ of certiorari with the Supreme Court.

== Opinion of the Court ==
The Court held that retaliation is covered under 42 U.S.C. § 1981 which provides that "[a]ll persons within the jurisdiction of the United States shall have the same right in every State and Territory to make and enforce contracts . . . as is enjoyed by white citizens". The court then held that CBOCS did indeed violate Title VII of the Civil Rights Act of 1964 and U.S.C. § 1981. The court relied heavily on stare decisis in its decision, citing Sullivan v. Little Hunting Park, Inc., 396 U.S. 229 (1969), and Jackson v. Birmingham Board of Education.
