= Riley v. Kennedy =

- Supreme Court of the United States

Decided May 27, 2008
- Full case name: Riley v. Kennedy
- Citations: 553 U.S. 406 (more)

Holding
- A court's order resolving liability without addressing a plaintiff's requests for relief is not a final judgment.

Court membership
- Chief Justice John Roberts Associate Justices John P. Stevens · Antonin Scalia; Anthony Kennedy · David Souter; Clarence Thomas · Ruth Bader Ginsburg; Stephen Breyer · Samuel Alito

Case opinions
- Majority: Ginsburg, joined by Roberts, Scalia, Kennedy, Thomas, Breyer, Alito
- Dissent: Stevens, joined by Souter

Riley v. Kennedy, 553 U.S. 406 (2008), was a United States Supreme Court case in which the court held that a court's order resolving liability without addressing a plaintiff's requests for relief is not a final judgment. The facts of the case involved Section Five of the Voting Rights Act.
