= Regalado Cuellar v. United States =

- Supreme Court of the United States

Decided June 2, 2008
- Full case name: Regalado Cuellar v. United States
- Citations: 553 U.S. 550 (more)

Holding
- The federal money-laundering statute contains no "legitimate wealth" requirement, and mere proof that the defendant was attempting to conceal the money is not enough to uphold a conviction.

Court membership
- Chief Justice John Roberts Associate Justices John P. Stevens · Antonin Scalia; Anthony Kennedy · David Souter; Clarence Thomas · Ruth Bader Ginsburg; Stephen Breyer · Samuel Alito

Case opinions
- Majority: Thomas, joined by unanimous
- Concurrence: Alito, joined by Roberts, Kennedy

Regalado Cuellar v. United States, 553 U.S. 550 (2008), was a United States Supreme Court case in which the court held that the federal money-laundering statute contains no "legitimate wealth" requirement, and mere proof that the defendant was attempting to conceal the money is not enough to uphold a conviction.

== Background ==
Regalado Cuellar was arrested after a search of the car he was driving through Texas toward Mexico revealed nearly $81,000 bundled in plastic bags and covered with animal hair in a secret compartment under the rear floorboard. Regalado Cuellar was charged with, and convicted of, attempting to transport "funds from a place in the United States to... a place outside the United States... knowing that the... funds... represent the proceeds of... unlawful activity and... that such transportation... is designed... to conceal or disguise the nature, the location, the source, the ownership, or the control of the proceeds of " the money, in violation of the federal money laundering statute, 18 U. S. C. §1956(a)(2)(B)(i). Affirming, the Fifth Circuit Court of Appeals rejected as inconsistent with the statutory text petitioner's argument that the Government must prove that he attempted to create the appearance of legitimate wealth, but held that his extensive efforts to prevent the funds' detection during transportation showed that he sought to conceal or disguise their nature, location, source, ownership, or control.

== Opinion of the court ==
The Supreme Court issued an opinion on June 2, 2008.
