= Davis v. FEC =

Davis v. Federal Election Commission
- Supreme Court of the United States

Argued April 22, 2008 Decided June 26, 2008
- Full case name: Jack Davis, Appellant v. Federal Election Commission
- Docket no.: 07-320
- Citations: 554 U.S. 724 (more) 128 S. Ct. 2759; 171 L. Ed. 2d 737

Questions presented
- Does the so-called "Millionaire's Amendment" to the McCain-Feingold law, which increases the limit on financial contributions to nominees who are running against self-funded opponents in political campaigns, violate the Free Speech Clause of the First Amendment and/or Due Process Clause of the Fifth Amendment to the Constitution of the United States of America.

Holding
- Limitations on financial contributions to political campaigns of candidates whose opponents are self-funding their own campaigns may not be raised beyond whatever their opponents can legally contribute. Section 319 of the Bipartisan Campaign Reform Act of 2002 violated the Free Speech Clause of the First Amendment.

Court membership
- Chief Justice John Roberts Associate Justices John P. Stevens · Antonin Scalia; Anthony Kennedy · David Souter; Clarence Thomas · Ruth Bader Ginsburg; Stephen Breyer · Samuel Alito

Case opinions
- Majority: Alito, joined by Roberts, Scalia, Kennedy, Thomas; Stevens, Souter, Ginsburg, Breyer (Part II)
- Concur/dissent: Stevens, joined by Souter, Ginsburg, Breyer (Part II)
- Concur/dissent: Ginsburg, joined by Breyer

Laws applied
- U.S. Const. amend. I; 2 U.S.C. § 441a–1(a) and (b) (section 319(a) and (b) of the Bipartisan Campaign Reform Act of 2002)

Davis v. Federal Election Commission, 554 U.S. 724 (2008), is a decision by the Supreme Court of the United States which held that section 319 (popularly known as the "Millionaire's Amendment") of the Bipartisan Campaign Reform Act of 2002 (popularly known as the McCain-Feingold law) unconstitutionally infringed on candidates' rights as provided by First Amendment.

== Background ==
Section 319 of the Bipartisan Campaign Reform Act of 2002 contained provisions which required a candidate for federal office in the United States to file a "declaration of intent" regarding how much of the candidate's personal funds they intended to spend in the upcoming election. This provision was unofficially known as the "Millionaire's Amendment" and it could only be triggered if the candidate's "opposition personal funds amount" (OPFA)—the amount of personal funds available to them for expenditure in the race—exceeded $350,000 USD. Additional disclosures were required to be made to the opposition candidate, any involved national political parties, and the Federal Election Commission (FEC) if these personal expenditures exceeded additional, enumerated benchmarks in the legislation. Once the OPFA was triggered, the wealthy candidate would still be subject to the contribution limitations imposed by the BCRA and other federal and state laws. However, the Millionaire's Amendment provided that the contribution caps for the non-self-financing opposition candidate were now tripled, and the non-self-financing candidate could receive coordinated contributions and expenditures from his or her national political party without any limitation.

Plaintiff Jack Davis brought suit against the Federal Election Commission, alleging that the BCRA disclosure and limitation restrictions on wealthy candidates violated his First Amendment rights.

A three-judge panel of the United States District Court for the District of Columbia found that the court had jurisdiction over the case, but upheld the BCRA against Davis' challenge. Davis appealed directly to the U.S. Supreme Court.

=== Jack Davis ===
John "Jack" Davis is an American businessman and founder of the I Squared R Element Company which produces and sells heating elements. He has run four times for the Congressional seat representing New York's 26th congressional district, in 2004, 2006, 2008 and 2011; all bids have been unsuccessful. In the first three of those elections, Davis, a former Republican, ran as a Democrat. For the 2004 and 2006 candidacies, he was the Democratic nominee and faced no primary challengers in his unsuccessful bids against incumbent Republican Tom Reynolds; in the 2008 race, he finished in third place in a three-way Democratic primary to Alice Kryzan. In the 2011 election, Davis, who has since changed his registration back to Republican, ran on the "Tea Party" line, a line created by Buffalo area Libertarian Party activist James Ostrowski primarily to run candidates against endorsed Republicans. (Davis sought the endorsements of the Republican and Conservative parties in the 2011 election, but did not receive either one.)

Davis filed his lawsuit against the Federal Election Commission between his 2006 and 2008 runs for office.

== Decision ==
Associate Justice Samuel Alito wrote the majority opinion for the court, in which Chief Justice John G. Roberts and Justices Antonin Scalia, Anthony Kennedy, and Clarence Thomas joined.

=== Majority ruling ===
Alito reviewed the law in question and major facts of the case in Section I of his ruling.

In Section II, Alito next dealt with the Court's jurisdiction, which had to be established for a ruling to occur. The Court would have jurisdiction only if the appellant could show a personal interest in the controversy, and if an actual controversy existed (and was not moot). All parties agreed that Davis had standing, but the FEC had argued that since Davis' opponent had not yet filed any documents there was no controversy. The majority held that standing applied only to the party raising the issue, not to all parties in the case. Additionally, the FEC argued that the issue was moot, as the election was long over. Again, the majority disagreed, holding that the case represented a "disputes capable of repetition, yet evading review." Justices John Paul Stevens, David Souter, Ruth Bader Ginsburg, and Stephen Breyer concurred with the majority in part and dissented in part concerning Section III of the majority ruling (see below).

In Section III of his ruling, Alito concluded that Section 319(a) and 319(b) of the BCRA failed to pass constitutional muster. Campaign finance limitations not only must equally apply to all candidates, Alito argued from precedent, but they must be narrowly drawn to advance important governmental interests (such as avoiding corruption in the political process). But Section 319(a) not only did not provide a level playing field, it fundamentally restricted the right of a self-financing candidate to spend his or her own money in a preferred way. No important governmental interest was advanced, Alito held, because (as the Court had held in Buckley v. Valeo, 424 U.S. 1 in 1976) a reliance on personal expenditures fundamentally reduces the likelihood of corruption. The FEC had argued that a level playing field was an important governmental interest. But Alito held that this was not an important governmental interest, and in fact the Court had said as much in Buckley v. Valeo three decades earlier. Indeed, the BCRA raises the ominous spectre of the public determining how valuable a wealthy person's speech is, something (Alito said) the Constitution does not permit. The government had argued that the low limits on federal campaign contributions were actually ameliorated when OPFA was triggered, advancing another important government interest. But Alito disagreed, arguing that if the limits are onerous then Congress should simply raise them to advance that important interest.

In Section IV of his decision, Alito declared Section 319(b) unconstitutional as well, tied as it was to Section 319(a).

=== Stevens' dissent ===
Justice John Paul Stevens dissented from Section III of the majority opinion. He was joined by Justices Souter, Ginsburg, and Breyer.

Stevens joined Section II of the majority opinion, agreeing that Davis had standing and that the controversy was not moot.

The district court, Stevens said, had found no restriction on the self-financing candidate's ability to spend as much or as little money as he or she pleased. Thus, he concluded, there was no First Amendment infringement whatsoever. Because Section 319(a) and 319(b) merely diminished the unequal footing of candidates for federal office, Stevens also found no infringement of the Fifth Amendment to the United States Constitution either.

Stevens broke with Buckley v. Valeo, arguing that Justice Byron White's dissent in Buckley was correct. White had argued that restrictions on political speech should not be seen as restrictions per se, but rather as reasonable regulations akin to "time, manner, and place" regulations long accepted by the Court. Such regulations are judged by the "legitimate and sufficiently substantial" test rather than the stricter "important governmental interest" test. He found the reporting regulations imposed on wealthy candidates a reasonable limitation which would survive constitutional scrutiny.

Even if one accepted the Buckley Court's reasoning, Stevens said, the two goals of reducing the influence of wealth as a criterion for office and reducing the impression that public office is available only to the highest bidder are important governmental interests which meet the majority's test. Davis had not shown that Section 319(a) harms his ability to spend, Stevens said. Amplification of the opponent's voice does not mean a diminution of the self-financing candidate's voice. The Buckley Court had not concluded that reducing corruption and the appearance of corruption were the only important governmental interests to be served (as the majority had concluded), but were one of many such interests which might justify an infringement on First Amendment rights. Stevens cited several precedents where the Supreme Court had upheld restrictions on wealthy individuals in order to improve the political process.

Stevens also criticized the majority for not addressing Davis' equal protection claim. Citing Buckley v. Valeo and the more recent McConnell v. Federal Election Commission, 540 U.S. 93 (2003), Stevens said that the Court had condoned legislative solutions which treat candidates differently, and the BCRA did just that.

=== Ginsburg's dissent ===
Justice Ginsburg filed a short opinion concurring in part and dissenting in part. Justice Breyer joined her opinion.

Ginsburg joined Section II of the majority opinion, agreeing that Davis had standing and that the controversy was not moot.

However, Ginsburg joined Section II of Justice Stevens' dissent, and agreed that Section 319(a) and Section 319(b) of the BCRA passed constitutional muster.

Ginsburg did not join that part of Stevens' dissent where he argued that Buckley v. Valeo was wrongly decided. The FEC had not asked the Court to overturn Buckley, and no briefs on that matter had been offered. Since Ginsburg felt that Section 319(a) and Section 319(b) of the BCRA were constitutionally acceptable, she refused to go further (as Stevens had) and overrule Buckley.
