= Washington State Grange v. Washington State Republican Party =

- Supreme Court of the United States

Argued October 1, 2007 Decided March 18, 2008
- Full case name: Washington State Grange v. Washington State Republican Party
- Citations: 552 U.S. 442 (more)

Holding
- Washington's top-two primary system does not infringe upon smaller political parties' associational rights.

Court membership
- Chief Justice John Roberts Associate Justices John P. Stevens · Antonin Scalia; Anthony Kennedy · David Souter; Clarence Thomas · Ruth Bader Ginsburg; Stephen Breyer · Samuel Alito

Case opinions
- Majority: Thomas, joined by Roberts, Stevens, Souter, Ginsburg, Breyer, Alito
- Concurrence: Roberts, joined by Alito
- Dissent: Scalia, joined by Kennedy

Washington State Grange v. Washington State Republican Party, 552 U.S. 442 (2008), was a United States Supreme Court case in which the Court held that Washington's top-two primary system does not infringe upon smaller political parties' associational rights.

== See also ==
- California Democratic Party v. Jones
