= New Jersey v. Delaware =

- Supreme Court of the United States

Argued November 27, 2007 Decided March 31, 2008
- Full case name: State of New Jersey v. State of Delaware
- Citations: 552 U.S. 597 (more) 128 S.Ct. 1410; 170 L. Ed. 2d 315

Holding
- A 1905 agreement between the two states did not grant New Jersey exclusive jurisdiction over riparian improvements near New Jersey, but on the Delaware side of the border.

Court membership
- Chief Justice John Roberts Associate Justices John P. Stevens · Antonin Scalia; Anthony Kennedy · David Souter; Clarence Thomas · Ruth Bader Ginsburg; Stephen Breyer · Samuel Alito

Case opinions
- Majority: Ginsburg, joined by Roberts, Kennedy, Souter, Thomas; Stevens (paragraphs 1(c), 2, 3, and 4 of Decree)
- Concur/dissent: Stevens
- Dissent: Scalia, joined by Alito
- Breyer took no part in the consideration or decision of the case.

Laws applied
- 1905 Interstate Compact between the two states

New Jersey v. Delaware, 552 U.S. 597 (2008), is a United States Supreme Court case in which New Jersey sued Delaware, invoking the Supreme Court's original jurisdiction under 28 U.S.C. § 1251(a), following Delaware's denial of oil company BP's petition to build a liquefied natural gas pipeline and loading facility on the New Jersey side of the Delaware River. Delaware denied BP's petition because it violated Delaware's Coastal Zone Act. BP then sought New Jersey's approval of the project. Delaware objected because the construction would require dredging of underwater land within Delaware's borders, which extend to the low-tide mark of the New Jersey shore. BP's proposal had not yet passed New Jersey's approval process when New Jersey and BP filed suit against Delaware.

Jurisdiction over rivers that form a border between states is usually determined by dividing the river down the middle between the states; this is not the case with the Delaware River. Delaware–New Jersey's curious border is the result of a grant by King Charles II in 1681, when the Delaware Colony was leased by William Penn from King Charles to become the three lower counties of Pennsylvania. The grant extended Delaware's northern border by The Twelve-Mile Circle in New Castle, Delaware, extending across the Delaware River. If the circle were to be extended fully, it would have included a portion of New Jersey, but this was unacceptable because that land had already been granted. As a result, the 12-Mile-Circle terminated at the mean low water mark on New Jersey's shore. The post-1681 border gave present-day Delaware full ownership of the Delaware River along a stretch of the New Jersey border.

The case adjudicated by the Supreme Court is the third incarnation of this litigation. The dispute over the border reaches back to the nation's creation. A settlement was reached between the States at the beginning of the 20th century because the costs of litigation had grown too high. The issue remained settled until New Jersey sued Delaware regarding the BP pipeline.

== Opinion of the Court ==
The Supreme Court appointed a special master to review. The Special Master was a practitioner in Maine who had experience in original jurisdiction land disputes. He oversaw production and heard oral arguments in the Third Circuit's court in Philadelphia, Pennsylvania. The Special Master made a recommendation to the Supreme Court, and the Court held, in a 6–2 decision, that Delaware has jurisdiction over the subaqueous soil, even though BP proposed to build on New Jersey's side of the Delaware River.

The only two dissenting Justices (Scalia and Alito) are both from New Jersey. Scalia wrote in his opinion, "The New Jersey–Delaware Compact of 1905 (Compact or 1905 Compact), Art. VII, 34 Stat. 860, addressed the 'exercise [of] riparian jurisdiction,' and the power to 'make grants ... of riparian ... rights.' The particular riparian right at issue here is the right of wharfing out. All are agreed that jurisdiction and power over that right were given to New Jersey on its side of the Delaware River."

Justice Stephen Breyer recused himself from the case; according to his financial disclosure form, he owned between $15,001 and $50,000 in BP stock.
