= LaRue v. DeWolff, Boberg & Associates, Inc. =

- Supreme Court of the United States

Decided February 20, 2008
- Full case name: LaRue v. DeWolff, Boberg & Associates, Inc.
- Citations: 552 U.S. 248 (more)

Holding
- Although ERISA does not provide a remedy for individual injuries distinct from plan injuries, it does authorize someone with a retirement account to recover from an account manager who commits fiduciary breaches that impair the value of plan assets in that person's individual account.

Court membership
- Chief Justice John Roberts Associate Justices John P. Stevens · Antonin Scalia; Anthony Kennedy · David Souter; Clarence Thomas · Ruth Bader Ginsburg; Stephen Breyer · Samuel Alito

Case opinion
- Majority: Stevens, joined by unanimous

Laws applied
- Employee Retirement Income Security Act of 1974

LaRue v. DeWolff, Boberg & Associates, Inc., 552 U.S. 248 (2008), was a United States Supreme Court case in which the court held that, although the Employee Retirement Income Security Act of 1974 (ERISA) does not provide a remedy for individual injuries distinct from plan injuries, it does authorize someone with a retirement account to recover from an account manager who commits fiduciary breaches that impair the value of plan assets in that person's individual account.

== Background ==
James LaRue, a participant in a defined contribution pension plan, alleged that the plan administrator's failure to follow LaRue's investment directions "depleted" his interest in the plan by approximately $150,000 and amounted to a breach of fiduciary duty under ERISA. The federal district court granted respondents judgment on the pleadings, and the Fourth Circuit Court of Appeals affirmed. Relying on Massachusetts Mutual Life Insurance Co. v. Russell, the Fourth Circuit held that ERISA Section 502(a)(2) provides remedies only for entire plans, not for individuals.

== Opinion of the court ==
The court issued an opinion on February 20, 2008.
