= Greenlaw v. United States =

- Supreme Court of the United States

Argued April 15, 2008 Decided June 23, 2008
- Full case name: Michael Greenlaw, aka Mikey, Petitioner v. United States
- Docket no.: 07-330
- Citations: 554 U.S. 237 (more) 128 S. Ct. 2559; 171 L. Ed. 2d 399; 2008 U.S. LEXIS 5259; 76 U.S.L.W. 4533; 21 Fla. L. Weekly Fed. S 421
- Decision: Opinion

Case history
- Prior: 481 F.3d 601 (8th Cir. 2007); cert. granted, 552 U.S. 1087 (2008).

Holding
- A federal appeals court may not sua sponte increase a criminal sentence in the absence of an appeal filed by the government.

Court membership
- Chief Justice John Roberts Associate Justices John P. Stevens · Antonin Scalia; Anthony Kennedy · David Souter; Clarence Thomas · Ruth Bader Ginsburg; Stephen Breyer · Samuel Alito

Case opinions
- Majority: Ginsburg, joined by Roberts, Scalia, Kennedy, Souter, Thomas
- Concurrence: Breyer (in judgment)
- Dissent: Alito, joined by Stevens; Breyer (Parts I, II, and III)

Laws applied
- 18 U.S.C. § 3742; Fed. R. App. P. 3, 4, 26

Greenlaw v. United States, 554 U.S. 237 (2008), was a United States Supreme Court case in which the Court held that a federal appeals court may not sua sponte increase a defendant's sentence unless the government first files a notice of appeal.

== Background ==
Greenlaw had been charged in federal district court in Minnesota with eight counts related to his participation in gang-related sales of crack cocaine in a neighborhood on the south side of Minneapolis. Two of these crimes were for violating 18 U.S.C. § 924(c), which provides for a mandatory consecutive sentence for those who use firearms during or in relation to a drug crime. The mandatory consecutive sentence amounts to 25 years if the defendant suffers a second or subsequent conviction under § 924(c). The district court made an error at sentencing when it overlooked the holding in Deal v. United States, that the 25-year mandatory consecutive sentence is triggered even if the defendant's two § 924(c) convictions come from the same criminal case. The district court computed Greenlaw's sentence at 262 months, then added 120 months for the two separate "first-time" § 924(c) convictions.

Greenlaw appealed his sentence, but the Government did not. Greenlaw argued that his sentence was unreasonably long; the Government pointed out the district court's computation error only to indicate that his sentence was unreasonably short. The Eighth Circuit rejected all of Greenlaw's arguments in favor of a reduced sentence. Relying on the "plain error" rule of Fed. R. Crim. P. 52(c), the Eighth Circuit ordered the district court to impose the 25-year mandatory consecutive sentence for a second § 924(c) conviction. Greenlaw asked the U.S. Supreme Court to review the case.

== Opinion of the Court ==
"In our adversary system, in both civil and criminal cases, in the first instance and on appeal, we follow the principle of party presentation. That is, we rely on the parties to frame the issues for decision and assign to the courts the role of neutral arbiter of matters the parties present." As relevant to this case, the rules of appellate procedure required the government to notify the district court and Greenlaw that it was seeking an increase in Greenlaw's sentence by filing its own notice of appeal. Without such a notice of appeal, the rule has historically been that an appellate court may not alter the judgment of the lower court to benefit a nonappealing party. Furthermore, in criminal cases, the Government may not appeal without first consulting and obtaining the personal approval of the Attorney General, the Solicitor General, or a deputy solicitor general. These two rules "should garner the Judiciary's full respect."

The Eighth Circuit, nevertheless, predicated increasing Greenlaw's sentence by 15 years on its reading of the plain-error rule of Fed. R. Crim. P. 52(b). "A plain error that affects substantial rights may be considered [on appeal] even though it was not brought to the [lower] court's attention." When Congress enacted the Federal Rules of Criminal Procedure, however, there was no intent to supplant the cross-appeal requirement. Ordinarily, the plain-error rule inures to the benefit of defendants; appellate courts will correct so-called "plain" errors only when ignoring them would work to the detriment of the defendant (who usually has a different lawyer on appeal). In the absence of a cross-appeal, the plain-error rule does not allow appellate judges to interfere with the assessment of high-level executive-branch officials who may have decided that appealing a sentence in a particular criminal case was not a wise expenditure of resources.

Furthermore, nothing in the text of 18 U.S.C. § 3742 overrides the cross-appeal rule. Indeed, § 3742 was enacted in 1984 with full knowledge of the cross-appeal rule, which had been a firmly entrenched rule of appellate procedure. Reading § 3742 to allow appellate courts to sua sponte increase criminal sentences without an appeal from the government would "give with one hand what it takes away with the other." Executive-branch officials would be vested with the discretion to seek an increased sentence, but their decision not to do so could be overridden by judicial officers; Congress, in enacting § 3742, would not have intended such an inconsistent result.

Finally, the Court has long held that the deadlines for filing a notice of appeal are firm, and that the purpose of having such firm deadlines is to preserve an opposing party's interest in notice and finality. If an appellate court could increase a sentence sua sponte without the Government's filing a notice of appeal, nothing would prevent the Government from routinely asking appellate courts to exercise that power for the first time in its responsive brief in the court of appeals. This, in turn, would deprive criminal defendants of the opportunity to argue against increasing their sentences, because other rules of appellate practice forbid parties who file appeals from raising new arguments for the first time in responding to arguments made by the prevailing party in the lower court. Indeed, Greenlaw might have chosen not to appeal at all if he knew that to do so risked a sua sponte increase in his sentence, even if that increase was the result of an effort to correct a legal error made by the district court.

Justice Stephen Breyer emphasized that he concurred in the judgment solely because he believed the cross-appeal rule to be a "rule of practice" for the courts of appeals rather than a jurisdictional limitation.

=== Dissenting opinion ===
Justice Samuel Alito started with the premise that the cross-appeal rule was merely a "rule of appellate practice" that "rest[s] on premises about the efficient use of judicial resources and the proper role of the tribunal in an adversary system." Because those rules are judge-made rules, they can be altered by judges sua sponte.

== See also ==
- List of United States Supreme Court cases, volume 554
