= Irizarry v. United States =

- Supreme Court of the United States

Decided June 12, 2008
- Full case name: Irizarry v. United States
- Citations: 553 U.S. 708 (more)

Holding
- Federal Rule of Criminal Procedure 32(h) does not apply to a variance from a recommended Federal Sentencing Guidelines range; that rule applies only to "departures."

Court membership
- Chief Justice John Roberts Associate Justices John P. Stevens · Antonin Scalia; Anthony Kennedy · David Souter; Clarence Thomas · Ruth Bader Ginsburg; Stephen Breyer · Samuel Alito

Case opinions
- Majority: Stevens
- Dissent: Breyer, joined by Kennedy, Souter, Ginsburg

Laws applied
- Fed. R. Crim. P. 32(h)

Irizarry v. United States, 553 U.S. 708 (2008), was a United States Supreme Court case in which the court held that Federal Rule of Criminal Procedure 32(h) does not apply to a variance from a recommended Federal Sentencing Guidelines range; that rule applies only to "departures."
