= Gonzalez v. United States =

- Supreme Court of the United States

Decided May 12, 2008
- Full case name: Gonzalez v. United States
- Citations: 553 U.S. 242 (more)

Holding
- The right to have a district judge preside over jury selection can be waived by counsel, allowing a magistrate judge to serve as a substitute.

Court membership
- Chief Justice John Roberts Associate Justices John P. Stevens · Antonin Scalia; Anthony Kennedy · David Souter; Clarence Thomas · Ruth Bader Ginsburg; Stephen Breyer · Samuel Alito

Case opinions
- Majority: Kennedy, joined by Roberts, Stevens, Souter, Ginsburg, Breyer, Alito
- Concurrence: Scalia (in judgment)
- Dissent: Thomas

Gonzalez v. United States, 553 U.S. 242 (2008), was a United States Supreme Court case in which the court held that the right to have a district judge preside over jury selection can be waived by counsel, allowing a magistrate judge to serve as a substitute judge .

== Background ==
If the parties consent, a federal magistrate judge may preside over the voir dire and jury selection in a felony criminal trial. The Supreme Court said as much in Peretz v. United States. Before Gonzalez's federal trial on felony drug charges, his counsel consented to the magistrate judge's presiding over jury selection. Gonzalez was not asked for his own consent. After the magistrate judge supervised jury selection without objection, a district judge presided at trial, and the jury returned a guilty verdict on all counts. Gonzalez contended for the first time on appeal that it was error not to obtain his own consent to the magistrate judge's jury selection role. The Fifth Circuit Court of Appeals affirmed the convictions, concluding, among other things, that the right to have a district judge preside over jury selection could be waived by counsel.

== Opinion of the court ==
=== Majority Opinion ===
The Supreme Court issued an opinion on May 12, 2008, affirming the decision of the Fifth Circuit. For the 8-1 majority, Justice Kennedy wrote that "to require in all instances that [trial management matters] be approved by the client could risk compromising the efficiencies and fairness that the trial process is designed to promote." Thus, express consent by a defendant's lawyer is sufficient to satisfy the statute. Kennedy dismissed Gonzalez's argument that appointment of the magistrate raised "a question of constitutional significance" writing that the avoidance canon, "does not apply unless there are 'serious concerns about the statute’s constitutionality.'"

=== Other opinions ===
Justice Scalia wrote an opinion concurring in the judgment because he did not agree "with the tactical-vs.-fundamental test on which" the Court based its conclusion. Justice Thomas dissented, writing that he "would overrule Peretz and hold that the delegation of voir dire in this case was statutory error."
