= Dada v. Mukasey =

- Supreme Court of the United States

Argued January 7, 2008 Decided June 16, 2008
- Full case name: Samson Taiwo Dada, Petitioner v. Michael B. Mukasey, Attorney General
- Docket no.: 06-1181
- Citations: 554 U.S. 1 (more) 128 S. Ct. 2307; 171 L. Ed. 2d 178

Case history
- Prior: 207 F. App'x 425 (5th Cir. 2006); cert. granted, 551 U.S. 1188 (2007).
- Subsequent: 288 F. App'x 981 (5th Cir. 2008)

Holding
- A non-citizen must be permitted an opportunity to withdraw a motion for voluntary departure, provided the request is made before expiration of the departure period.

Court membership
- Chief Justice John Roberts Associate Justices John P. Stevens · Antonin Scalia; Anthony Kennedy · David Souter; Clarence Thomas · Ruth Bader Ginsburg; Stephen Breyer · Samuel Alito

Case opinions
- Majority: Kennedy, joined by Stevens, Souter, Ginsburg, Breyer
- Dissent: Scalia, joined by Roberts, Thomas
- Dissent: Alito

Dada v. Mukasey, 554 U.S. 1 (2008), was a United States Supreme Court case in which the court held that a non-citizen must be permitted an opportunity to withdraw a motion for voluntary departure, provided the request is made before expiration of the departure period.

== Background ==
Samson T. Dada, a citizen of Nigeria, alleged that he married an American citizen in 1999. His wife filed an I–130 Petition for Alien Relative on his behalf that was denied in 2003. The Department of Homeland Security (DHS) charged Dada with being removable under the Immigration and Nationality Act for overstaying his temporary nonimmigrant visa. The Immigration Judge denied the request for a continuance pending adjudication of a second I–130 petition, found Dada eligible for removal, and granted his request for voluntary departure under 8 U.S.C. §1229c(b). The Board of Immigration Appeals (BIA) affirmed and ordered Dada to depart within 30 days or suffer statutory penalties. Two days before the end of the 30-day period, Dada sought to withdraw his voluntary departure request and filed a motion to reopen removal proceedings under 8 U.S.C. §1229a(c)(7), contending that new and material evidence demonstrated a bona fide marriage and that his case should be continued until resolution of the second I–130 petition. After the voluntary departure period had expired, the BIA denied the request, reasoning that a non-citizen who had been granted voluntary departure but does not depart in a timely fashion is statutorily barred from receiving adjustment of status. It did not consider Dada's request to withdraw his voluntary departure request. The Fifth Circuit Court of Appeals affirmed.

== Opinion of the Court ==
The Court held, in a 5–4 decision, that complying with a deportation order did not strip an immigrant of the right to appeal that deportation order. Justice Anthony Kennedy wrote the majority opinion, joined by Justices John Paul Stevens, David Souter, Ruth Bader Ginsburg, and Stephen Breyer. Justice Antonin Scalia was joined by Justices John Roberts and Clarence Thomas in his dissent. Justice Samuel Alito wrote a separate dissent.
