= United States v. Ressam =

- Supreme Court of the United States

Decided May 19, 2008
- Full case name: United States v. Ressam
- Citations: 553 U.S. 272 (more)

Holding
- An person who possessed explosives "during" the commission of another crime is eligible for a mandatory 10-year sentence on top of any other sentence even if the explosives were not related to the crime they committed.

Court membership
- Chief Justice John Roberts Associate Justices John P. Stevens · Antonin Scalia; Anthony Kennedy · David Souter; Clarence Thomas · Ruth Bader Ginsburg; Stephen Breyer · Samuel Alito

Case opinions
- Majority: Stevens, joined by Roberts Kennedy, Souter, Ginsburg, Alito; Scalia, Thomas (Part I only)
- Concurrence: Thomas (in part), joined by Scalia
- Dissent: Breyer

United States v. Ressam, 553 U.S. 272 (2008), was a United States Supreme Court case in which the court held that an person who possessed explosives "during" the commission of another crime is eligible for a mandatory 10-year sentence on top of any other sentence even if the explosives were not related to the crime they committed.

== Background ==
Ahmed Ressam, later known as the "Millennium Bomber", gave false information on his customs form while attempting to enter the United States by car. A search of his car revealed explosives that he intended to detonate in the United States. He was convicted of, among other things, (1) feloniously making a false statement to a customs official in violation of 18 U. S. C. §1001, and (2) "carr[ying] an explosive during the commission of" that felony in violation of §844(h)(2). The latter carried a mandatory minimum of 10 years in prison. The Ninth Circuit Court of Appeals set aside the latter conviction because it read "during" in §844(h)(2) to include a requirement that the explosive be carried "in relation to" the underlying felony. The Supreme Court granted certiorari.

== Opinion of the court ==
The Supreme Court issued an opinion on May 19, 2008. The court reinstated the conviction, saying there was no requirement that the explosives be related to the felony.

Justice Breyer dissented, noting that the court's interpretation of the statute "would permit conviction of any individual who legally carries explosives at the time that he engages in a totally unrelated felony." For example, because of how "explosive" is statutorily defined, that would include "such commonplace materials as kerosene, gasoline, or certain fertilizers."
