= 2007 term per curiam opinions of the Supreme Court of the United States =

The Supreme Court of the United States handed down six per curiam opinions during its 2007 term, which began October 1, 2007 and concluded September 30, 2008.

Because per curiam decisions are issued from the Court as an institution, these opinions all lack the attribution of authorship or joining votes to specific justices. All justices on the Court at the time the decision was handed down are assumed to have participated and concurred unless otherwise noted.

== Court membership ==
Chief Justice: John Roberts

Associate Justices: John Paul Stevens, Antonin Scalia, Anthony Kennedy, David Souter, Clarence Thomas, Ruth Bader Ginsburg, Stephen Breyer, Samuel Alito

== Allen v. Siebert ==
- Full caption: Richard F. Allen, Commissioner, Alabama Department of Corrections v. Daniel Siebert
- Citations: 552 U.S. 3
- Full text of the opinion: official slip opinion

552 U.S. 3
Decided November 5, 2007.
Eleventh Circuit reversed and remanded.

The Court held that because Siebert's petition for state postconviction relief was rejected as untimely by the Alabama courts, it was not "properly filed" under §2244(d)(2). Accordingly, he was not entitled to tolling of AEDPA’s 1-year statute of limitations.

Stevens filed a dissent, joined by Ginsburg.

== Arave v. Hoffman ==
- Full caption: Avron J. Arave, Warden v. Maxwell Hoffman
- Citations: 552 U.S. 117
- Full text of the opinion: official slip opinion

552 U.S. 117
Decided January 7, 2008.
Ninth Circuit vacated and remanded.

Before the decision, Hoffman filed a motion to vacate the decision below and vacate the decision as moot because he no longer wanted to contest his claim that he had received ineffective assistance during plea bargaining. Because this was "virtually identical" to the relief sought by the state, the state agreed. The court granted the motion.

== Wright v. Van Patten ==
- Full caption: Randall Wright, Sheriff, Shawano County, Wisconsin v. Joseph L. Van Patten
- Citations: 552 U.S. 120
- Full text of the opinion: official slip opinion

552 U.S. 120
Decided January 7, 2008.
Seventh Circuit reversed and remanded. Stevens filed an opinion concurring in the judgment.

There is no clearly established law contrary to the state court's conclusion that the defendant was not prejudiced by their defense attorney's telephonic appearance in a hearing. Therefore, there are not grounds justifying collateral relief.

== Medellín v. Texas ==
- Full caption: Jose Ernesto Medellin v. Texas
- Citations: 554 U.S. 759
- Prior history: Medellín v. State, No. 71,997 (Tex. Crim. App., May 16, 1997); petition denied, S.D. Tex.; certificate of appealability denied, 371 F.3d 270 (5th Cir. 2004); cert. granted, 543 U.S. 1032 (2005); cert. dismissed, 544 U.S. 660 (2005) (per curiam) (Medellín I); Ex parte Medellín, 223 S.W. 3d 315 (Tex. Crim. App. 2006); cert. granted Ex parte Medellín, 550 U.S. 917 (2007); aff'd, 552 U.S. 491 (2008) (Medellín II)
- Full text of the opinion: official slip opinion

554 U.S. 759
Decided August 5, 2008.
Applications for stay of execution and petition for a writ of habeas corpus denied.

Stevens, Souter, Ginsburg, and Breyer filed dissents.

== See also ==
- List of United States Supreme Court cases, volume 552
- List of United States Supreme Court cases, volume 554
