= John R. Sand & Gravel Co. v. United States =

- Supreme Court of the United States

Argued November 6, 2007 Decided January 8, 2008
- Full case name: John R. Sand & Gravel Co. v. United States
- Citations: 552 U.S. 130 (more)

Holding
- An action in the Court of Claims must always be timely, even if the government has waived timeliness.

Court membership
- Chief Justice John Roberts Associate Justices John P. Stevens · Antonin Scalia; Anthony Kennedy · David Souter; Clarence Thomas · Ruth Bader Ginsburg; Stephen Breyer · Samuel Alito

Case opinions
- Majority: Breyer, joined by Roberts, Scalia, Kennedy, Souter, Thomas, Alito
- Dissent: Stevens, joined by Ginsburg
- Dissent: Ginsburg

John R. Sand & Gravel Co. v. United States, 552 U.S. 130 (2008), was a United States Supreme Court case in which the Court held that an action in the United States Court of Claims must always be timely, even if the government has waived timeliness.
