= New York State Board of Elections v. Lopez Torres =

New York State Bd. of Elections v. Lopez Torres
- Supreme Court of the United States

Argued October 3, 2007 Decided January 16, 2008
- Full case name: New York State Board of Elections, et al. v. Margarita Lopez Torres, et al.
- Docket no.: 06-766
- Citations: 552 U.S. 196 (more) 128 S. Ct. 791; 169 L. Ed. 2d 665; 2008 U.S. LEXIS 1093; 76 U.S.L.W. 4052; 21 Fla. L. Weekly Fed. S 42

Case history
- Prior: 411 F. Supp. 2d 212 (E.D.N.Y 2006), aff'd, 462 F.3d 161 (2nd Cir. 2006).

Holding
- The court upheld New York's party-based judicial election laws.

Court membership
- Chief Justice John Roberts Associate Justices John P. Stevens · Antonin Scalia; Anthony Kennedy · David Souter; Clarence Thomas · Ruth Bader Ginsburg; Stephen Breyer · Samuel Alito

Case opinions
- Majority: Scalia, joined by Roberts, Stevens, Souter, Thomas, Ginsburg, Breyer, Alito
- Concurrence: Stevens, joined by Souter
- Concurrence: Kennedy (in judgment), joined by Breyer (Part II)

N.Y. State Bd. of Elections v. Lopez Torres, 552 U.S. 196 (2008), was a case decided by the United States Supreme Court that involved a constitutional challenge brought against New York State's judicial election law, alleging that it unfairly prevented candidates from obtaining access to the ballot. The Supreme Court rejected this challenge and held that the state's election laws did not infringe upon candidates' First Amendment associational rights. Several concurring justices emphasized, however, that their decision reflected only the constitutionality of the state's election system, and not its wisdom or merit.

== Background: New York state judicial election process ==
In New York, political party judicial candidates for the Supreme Courts (the state's general jurisdiction trial court) are elected through a three-part scheme that involves a primary election, a nominating convention, and a general election. Independent candidates need only meet general signature requirements to obtain a place on the general ballot.

During the primary election, judicial delegates (not candidates) are elected by the parties' rank and file members for each assembly district. The chosen delegates are sent to the judicial convention for the judicial district in which the assembly district is located. (The state is split into twelve judicial districts, each having up to several dozen assembly districts.) The judicial delegates vote for their parties' judicial nominees, whose names are listed on the general ballot.

A person seeking a political party judicial nomination, accordingly, must assemble a delegate (or group of delegates, who run together) for each assembly district in their judicial district. They must collect separate signatures in each assembly district to get supporting delegate(s) onto the primary ballot and, because delegate nominees cannot disclose which candidate they are affiliated with, they must also mount separate voter education campaigns in each assembly district to explain to the voters which delegates are representing which candidate. After being elected, the delegates can theoretically choose any judicial candidate they wish, but the short timeframe between the primary election and the convention (about two weeks), and the overriding influence of the party establishment, mean that delegates typically do not exercise independent judgment in choosing which candidates to support. The process is too onerous for candidates without significant financial resources or the support of their political party's apparatus, reducing opportunity for independent candidates.

== Facts and procedural posture ==
Margarita Lopez Torres received the Democratic Party nomination and was elected to the civil court for Kings County in 1992, becoming the first Latina to be elected to the court. She allegedly fell out of favor with local party leaders shortly thereafter for refusing to make patronage hires. She claimed that party leaders later refused to support her candidacy for the Supreme Court in 1997, 2002, and 2003. Lopez Torres, along with similarly situated candidates, their supporters, and the public interest group Common Cause, brought suit in federal court against the state Board of Elections, claiming that the nomination system deprived voters and their candidates of their rights to gain access to the ballot and to associate in their parties' primaries.

The District Court for the Eastern District of New York and the Second Circuit held in favor of Lopez Torres, finding that the voters and candidates possessed a First Amendment right to a

'realistic opportunity to participate in [a political party's] nominating process, and to do so free from burdens that are both severe and unnecessary.' New York's electoral law violated that right because of the quantity of signatures and delegate recruits required to obtain a Supreme Court nomination at a judicial convention ..., and because of the apparent reality that party leaders can control delegates. ...

== Supreme Court's decision ==
A nearly unanimous court in Lopez Torres overruled the Second Circuit and upheld the constitutionality of New York's judicial election system. The Court explained that although a political party has a First Amendment associational right to choose its candidates, that right is circumscribed when the party is given a role in the state's election process. Parties that are formally involved in the election process, for example, may be required to comply with a primary process and may be prohibited from maintaining racially discriminatory policies (which could become impermissible state action).

But, the Court explained, the political parties' associational rights were not at issue in the case; rather, the "weapon wielded by these plaintiffs is their own claimed associational right not only to join, but to have a certain degree of influence in, the party." In refusing to acknowledge the existence of such a right, the Court explained that nothing in the law prohibited the candidates from attending the convention and lobbying the delegates, and nothing in the law compelled the delegates to vote for their parties' preferred candidates. As the Court explained,

Our cases invalidating ballot-access requirements have focused on the requirements themselves, and not on the manner in which political actors' function under those requirements. ... None of our cases establishes an individual's constitutional right to have a 'fair shot' at winning the party's nomination.

The Court also rejected the plaintiffs' contention that the existence of entrenched "one-party rule" rendered the general election uncompetitive. As the Court noted, candidates could obtain a place on the ballot, without party affiliation, via New York's general petition-signature requirements.

== Concurring opinions ==
Justice Stevens, joined by Justice Souter, wrote a concurring opinion to emphasize that the court's decision dealt with the constitutionality of New York's judicial election system, and not its wisdom. He quoted Justice Thurgood Marshall, saying "The Constitution does not prohibit legislatures from enacting stupid laws."

Justice Kennedy's concurring opinion emphasized that the political party nomination was not the sole method of securing a place on the ballot. As he explained, a person seeking a Supreme Court judgeship could alternatively meet general petition-signature requirements, these being the lesser of either (1) five percent of the number of votes last cast for governor in the judicial district or (2) either 3,500 or 4,000 signatures (depending on the district). Were this route to the ballot not available, he suggested that the constitutionality of New York's election laws would be in greater doubt. In the second part of his opinion, which was joined by Justice Breyer, Justice Kennedy discussed the important role that elections can play in the selection of judges but warned that they might also foster abuse and manipulation. He stated:

If New York statutes for nominating and electing judges do not produce both the perception and the reality of a system committed to the highest ideals of the law, they ought to be changed and to be changed now. But, as the Court today holds, ... the present suit does not permit us to invoke the Constitution in order to intervene.

== See also ==
- Elections in New York
