= Republic of Philippines v. Pimentel =

- Supreme Court of the United States

Argued March 17, 2008 Decided June 12, 2008
- Full case name: Republic of Philippines et al. v. Jerry S. Pimentel, temporary administrator of the Estate of Mariano J. Pimentel, deceased, et al.
- Docket no.: 06-1204
- Citations: 553 U.S. 851 (more) 128 S. Ct. 2180; 171 L. Ed. 2d 131
- Argument: Oral argument
- Opinion announcement: Opinion announcement

Case history
- Prior: In re Estate of Marcos Human Rights Litig., 910 F. Supp. 1460 (D. Haw. 1995); affirmed sub nom. Hilao v. Estate of Marcos, 103 F.3d 767 (9th Cir. 1996); Merrill Lynch, Pierce, Fenner & Smith, Inc. v. ENC Corp., 446 F.3d 1019 (9th Cir.), opinion amended and superseded, 448 F.3d 1072 (9th Cir. 2006), and opinion amended and superseded on denial of rehearing, 464 F.3d 885 (9th Cir. 2006); cert. granted, 552 U.S. 1061 (2007).
- Subsequent: NY Slip Op 05208 (N.Y. App. Div. 2011); 973 N.E.2d 703 (N.Y. 2012); 681 F. App'x 37 (2d Cir. 2016); 14 Civ. 890 (KPF) (S.D.N.Y. 2018) et seq.

Holding
- Foreign sovereigns are "indispensable parties" under Rule 19 of the Federal Rules of Civil Procedure.

Court membership
- Chief Justice John Roberts Associate Justices John P. Stevens · Antonin Scalia; Anthony Kennedy · David Souter; Clarence Thomas · Ruth Bader Ginsburg; Stephen Breyer · Samuel Alito

Case opinions
- Majority: Kennedy, joined by Roberts, Scalia, Thomas, Ginsburg, Breyer, Alito; Souter (all but Parts IV–B and V); Stevens (Part II)
- Concur/dissent: Stevens
- Concur/dissent: Souter

Laws applied
- Federal Rules of Civil Procedure

Republic of Philippines v. Pimentel, (Note: Sic. The official name of the Philippines in English is the Republic of the Philippines, yet the Supreme Court Case, and the federal case before it, omits the "the".) 553 U.S. 851 (2008), is a decision of the Supreme Court of the United States which clarified the Federal Rules of Civil Procedure as regards money damages sought by a foreign government, the Republic of the Philippines, via its Presidential Commission on Good Government (PCGG). The case stemmed out of disputes surrounding one of the overseas investments and bank accounts of Ferdinand Marcos, Arelma S.A.. Marcos was President of the Philippines until being overthrown in the People Power Revolution.

== Background ==
=== Switzerland ===
As early as 1986, the account of Arelma S.A. was targeted by the PCGG as being ill-gotten money of the Marcos regime. Arelma S.A. owned assets both in Switzerland and in the US in the custody of Merrill Lynch & Co.; these assets were frozen in 1990. The Federal Supreme Court of Switzerland ruled in 1997 that the funds owned by Arelma S.A. were the property of the Republic of the Philippines, and remitted them to the Republic, with certain conditions, in 1998. The stock certificates for Arelma S.A. were given to the Republic with the same conditions in 2000.

=== United States ===
In the United States District Court for the District of Hawaii, in 1995, human rights victims of the Marcos regime, known in the suit as the "Pimentel class", won a ≈US$2 billion total judgment against the estate of Ferdinand Marcos. Thus began a long process of attempting to recover whatever money could be recovered through the US court system. The Pimentel class sought to compel Merrill Lynch & Co. to release the assets they held on behalf of Arelma S.A. to them.

Various creditors, including the Republic, also sought the same assets, arguing that as the crimes occurred in the Philippines and all victims were Filipino, Philippine courts (in this case, the Sandiganbayan) ought to disburse the funds according to Philippine law, which in the case of graft, provides that the funds rightly belong to the state.

Merrill Lynch, unsure who to release the assets to, filed an interpleader action asking that all of the lawsuits which make claims against the Arelma assets be consolidated into one action. The Republic, however, felt that it should not have to argue its case in court; that is to say, the Republic, being a foreign sovereign, did not feel that it could submit to a US court in this instance for a ruling. Then-Secretary of Justice Raul M. Gonzalez said simply, "this has to be decided here."

With the support of the United States, who advocated on their behalf as an amicus curiae, they argued that state immunity (known in US law as sovereign immunity) gives them first priority in terms of recovered assets, without having to argue with members of the Pimentel class.

The Pimentel class, represented by human rights lawyer Robert A. Swift, on the other hand, argued that the Republic had no right to appeal; when they invoked their right to sovereign immunity, they were not a party to the lower court's judgment, and only parties may appeal. While the Republic argued it was an "indispensable party" according to Rule 19 of the Federal Rules of Civil Procedure, the Pimentel class urged the Supreme Court to uphold the Ninth Circuit's ruling that it was not.

== Decision ==
The whole doctrine of sovereign immunity rests upon unfairness. It says you can't sue the sovereign even if you have a valid claim. [...] The doctrine of sovereign immunity always has unfair consequences.

— Justice Antonin Scalia

It was the Court's unanimous decision that both the District Court and the Ninth Circuit erred as regards interpretation of Rule 19; the Republic of the Philippines was indeed an "indispensable party" according to the rule, and because it had refused to appear in Court, the interpleader action should never have moved forward, even if the Republic was unlikely to win on the merits if it were a party.

As to the resolution, the Court decided 7-2 that the case should be dismissed. Justices Stevens and Souter dissented, instead arguing that decision was too "inflexible" given the circumstances. Instead, Justice Souter argued that the Court should have ruled that the District Court's judgment be vacated and a stay placed until the Sandiganbayan rules with finality on whether or not the Republic owns the assets in question.

The practical effect of the decision was a prioritizing of the Republic's claims to assets over those of human rights victims. As a result of the ruling, all assets ruled by the Sandiganbayan to be ill-gotten gains of Ferdinand Marcos became the property of the sovereign Republic of the Philippines, even those held by US companies.

Lawyers for the Pimentel class rebuked the decision, telling ABS-CBN News, "The case marks the first time the Supreme Court has surrendered the jurisdiction of its courts to a foreign country—and in this instance to a third world country which was not known for its not being corrupt."

== Subsequent history ==
In 2009, the Sandiganbayan finally ruled that the Arelma assets were, indeed, the Republic's property—this ruling was upheld twice by the Supreme Court of the Philippines; first in 2012, and then without possibility of further appeal in 2014.

Despite the ruling of the US Supreme Court, the Pimentel class has continued to try to get the Arelma assets in state court, where the Republic has continued to claim sovereign immunity. In Swezey v. Lynch (2012), 973 N.E.2d 703, the New York Court of Appeals interpreted CPLR § 1001, which has very similar wording to the federal Rule 19, identically, ruling that while the Pimentel class has a valid federal judgment, "the judgment that they secured is against the estate of Ferdinand Marcos and it can be lawfully executed only against property that the estate legally owns."

As noted by Richard J. Leon, Senior United States district judge of the United States District Court for the District of Columbia, after the 2012 ruling, the money was finally turned over by Merrill Lynch to New York City's Commissioner of Finance, who held the money between 2012 and 2017, as the Pimentel class continued to fight the forfeiture in favor of the Republic. In 2017, the funds were transferred to the New York State Office of the State Comptroller's Office of Unclaimed Funds.

Judge Leon ordered the case to the United States District Court for the Southern District of New York, where the Republic has continued to fight for the funds. As of January 13, 2020, the case there, known as District Attorney of New York County v. The Republic of the Philippines, is ongoing. Following an order in District Attorney, some funds were finally personally disbursed by Swift to some members of the Pimentel class in April 2019, over the unanimous objections of the Philippine government, who has continued to file motions in District Attorney.
