= Ali v. Federal Bureau of Prisons =

- Supreme Court of the United States

Argued October 29, 2007 Decided January 22, 2008
- Full case name: Abdus-Shahid M. S. Ali, Petitioner v. Federal Bureau of Prisons et al.
- Docket no.: 06-9130
- Citations: 552 U.S. 214 (more) 128 S. Ct. 831; 169 L. Ed. 2d 680; 76 U.S.L.W. 4057; 08 Cal. Daily Op. Serv. 854; 2008 Daily Journal D.A.R. 941; 21 Fla. L. Weekly Fed. S 53
- Argument: Oral argument

Holding
- The United States cannot be sued for failing to return property when the loss is caused by any law enforcement officer.

Court membership
- Chief Justice John Roberts Associate Justices John P. Stevens · Antonin Scalia; Anthony Kennedy · David Souter; Clarence Thomas · Ruth Bader Ginsburg; Stephen Breyer · Samuel Alito

Case opinions
- Majority: Thomas, joined by Roberts, Scalia, Ginsburg, Alito
- Dissent: Kennedy, joined by Stevens, Souter, Breyer
- Dissent: Breyer, joined by Stevens

Ali v. Federal Bureau of Prisons, 552 U.S. 214 (2008), was a United States Supreme Court case, upholding the United States's sovereign immunity against tort claims brought when "any law enforcement officer" loses a person's property. It was argued on October 29, 2007, and decided on January 22, 2008, by the Roberts Court.

== Background ==
Abdus-Shahid M. S. Ali, a federal prisoner in Atlanta, Georgia, was transferred to a prison in Inez, Kentucky. His personal property, packed into two duffel bags, was shipped separately. Upon inspecting his property after arrival at the new prison, he said that $177 worth of property was missing from the bags. Ali filed an administrative claim; relief was denied because Ali had signed a receipt form. Ali filed a lawsuit against the Federal Bureau of Prisons.

The case turned on the grammar of part of the Federal Tort Claims Act (FTCA), a 1946 law that waives sovereign immunity in some cases so that the federal government may be sued for certain torts. The FTCA states that the waiver of immunity does not apply to claims arising from the detention of property by "any officer of customs or excise or any other law enforcement officer." Ali argued that this text had been intended to encompass only law enforcement officers concerned with customs or excise laws. The Bureau of Prisons argued that the word "any" should be interpreted broadly.

== Opinion of the Court ==
The Supreme Court ruled against Ali in a 5–4 decision. Justice Clarence Thomas wrote, "The phrase 'any other law enforcement officer' suggests a broad meaning," and compared the phrasing to the phrasing of other laws, with and without the word "any."

In his dissent, Justice Anthony Kennedy wrote that the majority was using "wooden reliance" on the single word any without considering the rest of the paragraph of the FTCA, and added, "If Congress had intended to give sweeping immunity to all federal law enforcement officials from liability for the detention of property, it would not have dropped this phrase onto the end of the statutory clause so as to appear there as something of an afterthought."

== See also ==
- List of United States Supreme Court cases
- Lists of United States Supreme Court cases by volume
- List of United States Supreme Court cases by the Roberts Court
