= Kimbrough v. United States =

- Supreme Court of the United States

Argued October 2, 2007 Decided December 10, 2007
- Full case name: Derrick Kimbrough, Petitioner v. United States of America
- Docket no.: 06-6330
- Citations: 552 U.S. 85 (more) 128 S. Ct. 558; 169 L. Ed. 2d 481; 76 U.S.L.W. 4023; 07 Cal. Daily Op. Serv. 14,079; 2007 Daily Journal D.A.R. 18,164; 21 Fla. L. Weekly Fed. S 22

Holding
- The Federal Sentencing Guidelines for cocaine are advisory only, and a judge may consider the disparity between the Guidelines' treatment of crack and powder cocaine offenses when imposing a sentence sufficient, but not greater than necessary.

Court membership
- Chief Justice John Roberts Associate Justices John P. Stevens · Antonin Scalia; Anthony Kennedy · David Souter; Clarence Thomas · Ruth Bader Ginsburg; Stephen Breyer · Samuel Alito

Case opinions
- Majority: Ginsburg, joined by Roberts, Stevens, Scalia, Kennedy, Souter, Breyer
- Concurrence: Scalia
- Dissent: Thomas
- Dissent: Alito

Laws applied
- 21 U.S.C. § 841; U.S.S.G. 2D1.1; United States v. Booker

Kimbrough v. United States, 552 U.S. 85 (2007), was a United States Supreme Court case in which the Court confirmed that federal district judges utilize, in an advisory (not as law) fashion, Federal Sentencing Guidelines, in cases involving conduct related to possession, distribution, and manufacture of crack cocaine.

== Background ==
Derrick Kimbrough was indicted in September 2004 in federal court in Virginia on four drug-related counts: conspiracy to distribute both crack and powder cocaine; possession with intent to distribute more than 50 grams of crack cocaine; possession with intent to distribute powder cocaine; and possession of a firearm in furtherance of a drug trafficking offense. Kimbrough pleaded guilty to all four counts. Under the statutes that define these respective crimes, Kimbrough faced a sentence of between 15 years and life in prison. Based on the facts, Kimbrough admitted at his change-of-plea hearing, as well as the fact that Kimbrough had testified falsely at a codefendant's trial, the district court computed the applicable range under the federal sentencing guidelines at 18 to 22.5 years in prison.

Kimbrough's Guidelines range was so high because his offense involved both crack and powder cocaine. US District Court Judge Raymond Alvin Jackson observed that if Kimbrough's crime had involved powder cocaine only, his sentencing range would have been 97 to 106 months. The mandatory minimum sentence, in turn, was 180 months in prison, and the district judge imposed that sentence. Kimbrough was represented by Assistant Federal Public Defender Riley H. Ross III. The government was represented by Assistant United States Attorney William D. Murh.

The Fourth Circuit Court of Appeals vacated the sentence and remanded for further proceedings. Relying on a prior opinion, the appellate court stated that any sentence that fell outside the Guidelines range was per se unreasonable if that sentence was based on a policy disagreement with the fact that crack cocaine offenses are punished more harshly than powder cocaine offenses. The United States Supreme Court agreed to review the Fourth Circuit's reasoning in this case.

== Majority opinion ==
Under the Federal Sentencing Guidelines, a drug trafficker dealing in crack cocaine is subject to the same sentence as one who trafficks in 100 times as much powder cocaine. The two drugs are chemically similar; they produce the same high, although the modes of ingestion differ. The result of the 100-to-1 ratio is that sentences for crack cocaine offenders are three to six times longer than those for powder cocaine offenders. As the United States Sentencing Commission concluded in a 2002 report, a "major supplier of powder cocaine may receive a shorter sentence than a low-level dealer who buys powder from the supplier but then converts it into crack" cocaine.

In the Anti-Drug Abuse Act of 1986, heroin received a 10-to-1 ratio. Defendants responsible for 100 grams of heroin were subject to a five-year mandatory minimum, but defendants responsible for 1000 grams were subject to a ten-year mandatory minimum sentence. However, the Act imposed a 100-to-1 ratio for powder to crack cocaine. The same five-year mandatory minimum sentence applies to defendants who are held responsible for either 500 grams of powder cocaine or 5 grams of crack. The ten-year mandatory minimum applied to defendants responsible for either 5000 grams of powder cocaine or 50 grams of crack. The Sentencing Commission followed this approach when fixing penalties for powder and crack cocaine, even as it relied on empirical evidence culled from actual sentences imposed in other kinds of criminal cases to formulate the new Sentencing Guidelines.

Later, however, the Sentencing Commission came to the conclusion that the 100-to-1 ratio was "generally unwarranted." The ratio rests on unwarranted assumptions about the relative harmfulness of the two forms of the drugs. Crack cocaine was associated with "significantly less trafficking-related violence than previously assumed." It is no more harmful to developing fetuses than powder cocaine. The epidemic of crack addiction that had been feared in 1986 failed to materialize. Moreover, the 100-to-1 ratio indeed had the effect of punishing low-level dealers more harshly than major traffickers, because it was the low-level dealers and not the traffickers who converted the powder cocaine into crack. Finally, the ratio promoted widespread disrespect and distrust in the criminal justice system, especially because it promoted a racial discrepancy between the sentences imposed on cocaine defendants. Powder cocaine defendants tend to be white and receive shorter sentences than crack cocaine defendants, who tend to be black.

In 1995, the Commission proposed reducing the ratio to 1-to-1 and adding other enhancements targeted at crack cocaine crimes involving violence. Congress exercised its statutory authority to overrule this proposal. Undaunted, the Commission recommended reducing the ratio twice more—to 5-to-1 in 1997, and to 20-to-1 in 2002. Congress ignored these proposals. In 2006, the Commission unilaterally altered the sentencing ranges associated with crack cocaine, achieving in effect a 10-to-1 ratio in sentencing quantities. At the same time, however, it urged Congress to adopt a more comprehensive solution.

With the Court's decision in United States v. Booker, 543 U.S. 220 (2005), which made the then-mandatory Guidelines "effectively advisory," district courts were again free to impose sentences that took into account the "history and characteristics of the defendant," the "nature and circumstances of the offense," disparities in sentences that might be "unwarranted," and other factors to fashion a sentence that is "sufficient but not greater than necessary" to achieve the overall goals of sentencing. Even though the commission had implemented the ratio in the Guidelines, the Government contended that the commission could not alter the 100-to-1 ratio because that was a policy choice that Congress had required the commission to implement. The Court rejected this argument for three reasons.

First, it lacked any foundation in the text of the 1986 Anti-Drug Act. Hence, if before Booker the Act could not require the Commission to implement any particular ratio, it cannot impose the same requirement on sentencing judges after Booker.

Second, the fact that in 1995 Congress disapproved the commission's effort to impose a 1-to-1 ratio did not mean that Congress meant for the 100-to-1 ratio to apply in perpetuity. Indeed, when the Commission effectively changed the ratio to 10-to-1, Congress did not disapprove.

Third, "as we explained in Booker, advisory Guidelines combined with appellate review for reasonableness and ongoing revision of the Guidelines in response to sentencing practices" will help to avoid disparities that might result from relaxing the 100-to-1 ratio. Accordingly, the Court affirmed the 180-month sentence the district court had imposed on Kimbrough.

== Dissenting opinions ==
Justice Thomas continued to assert his disapproval of the remedial holding in United States v. Booker. "As a result of the Court's remedial approach, we are called upon to decide a multiplicity of questions that have no discernibly legal answers." One such question, in his view, was whether the district courts are free to disregard a "categorical policy judgment reflected in the Guidelines" when imposing a "reasonable" sentence. "But the Court's answer to that question necessarily derives from something other than the statutory language or congressional intent."

Justice Alito dissented for the same reason as he did in Gall v. United States.

== See also ==
- Fair Sentencing Act
