= Crawford v. Marion County Election Board =

- Supreme Court of the United States

Argued January 9, 2008 Decided April 28, 2008
- Full case name: William Crawford v. Marion County Election Board
- Docket no.: 07-21
- Citations: 553 U.S. 181 (more) 128 S. Ct. 1610; 170 L. Ed. 2d 574
- Argument: Oral argument

Case history
- Prior: Ind. Democratic Party v. Rokita, 458 F. Supp. 2d 775 (S.D. Ind. 2006); Crawford v. Marion County Election Board, 472 F.3d 949 (7th Cir. 2007); cert. granted, 551 U.S. 1192 (2007).

Holding
- A statute requiring voters to show a picture ID is constitutional.

Court membership
- Chief Justice John Roberts Associate Justices John P. Stevens · Antonin Scalia; Anthony Kennedy · David Souter; Clarence Thomas · Ruth Bader Ginsburg; Stephen Breyer · Samuel Alito

Case opinions
- Plurality: Stevens, joined by Roberts, Kennedy
- Concurrence: Scalia (in judgment), joined by Thomas, Alito
- Dissent: Souter, joined by Ginsburg
- Dissent: Breyer

Laws applied
- U.S. Const. amend. XIV; Indiana Public Law 109-2005 (SEA 483)

Crawford v. Marion County Election Board, 553 U.S. 181 (2008), was a United States Supreme Court case in which the Court held that an Indiana law requiring voters to provide photographic identification did not violate the United States Constitution.

== Background ==
A 2005 Indiana law required all voters casting a ballot in person to present a United States or Indiana photo ID. Under the Indiana law, voters who do not have a photo ID may cast a provisional ballot. To have their votes counted, they must visit a designated government office within ten days and bring a photo ID or sign a statement saying they cannot afford one.

The plaintiffs were unable to produce any witnesses who claimed they were unable to meet the law's requirements. The defendants were likewise unable to present any evidence that the corruption purportedly motivating the law actually existed.

In April 2006, U.S. District Judge Sarah Evans Barker granted summary judgment in favor of Indiana Secretary of State Todd Rokita. In January 2007, that judgment was affirmed by the United States Court of Appeals for the Seventh Circuit, where Judge Richard Posner was joined by Judge Diane S. Sykes, while Judge Terence T. Evans dissented. The circuit court was deeply divided, with the dissent characterizing the law as a thinly veiled attempt to disenfranchise low-income Democratic Party voters. The lead plaintiff was William Crawford, who was a Democratic member of the Indiana House of Representatives from Indianapolis from 1972 to 2012. The defendant was the election board of Marion County, Indiana. Indianapolis, the state capital, is in Marion County.

== Supreme Court ==
One hour of oral arguments were heard on January 9, 2008, in which Paul M. Smith appeared for the challengers, the Indiana Solicitor General appeared for the county, and U.S. Solicitor General Paul Clement appeared, representing the views of the United States, which supported Marion County.

On April 28, 2008, the Supreme Court delivered judgment in favor of Marion County, affirming the court below by a 6–3 vote. The Court failed to produce a majority opinion, with Justice John Paul Stevens, joined by Chief Justice John Roberts and Justice Anthony Kennedy, announcing the judgment of the Court.

Justice Stevens upheld the constitutionality of the photo ID requirement, finding it closely related to Indiana's legitimate state interest in preventing voter fraud, modernizing elections, and safeguarding voter confidence. Justice Stevens, in the leading opinion, stated that the burdens placed on voters are limited to a small percentage of the population and were offset by the state's interest in reducing fraud. Stevens wrote in the leading opinion:

The relevant burdens here are those imposed on eligible voters who lack photo identification cards that comply with SEA 483. Because Indiana's cards are free, the inconvenience of going to the Bureau of Motor Vehicles, gathering required documents, and posing for a photograph does not qualify as a substantial burden on most voters' right to vote, or represent a significant increase over the usual burdens of voting. The severity of the somewhat heavier burden that may be placed on a limited number of persons—e.g., elderly persons born out-of-state, who may have difficulty obtaining a birth certificate—is mitigated by the fact that eligible voters without photo identification may cast provisional ballots that will be counted if they execute the required affidavit at the circuit court clerk's office. Even assuming that the burden may not be justified as to a few voters, that conclusion is by no means sufficient to establish petitioners' right to the relief they seek.

=== Concurrence in the judgment ===
Justice Antonin Scalia, joined by Justice Samuel Alito and Clarence Thomas, concurred in the judgment only. Justice Scalia states in his concurring opinion that the Supreme Court should defer to state and local legislators and that the Supreme Court should not get involved in local election law cases, which would do nothing but encourage more litigation:

It is for state legislatures to weigh the costs and benefits of possible changes to their election codes, and their judgment must prevail unless it imposes a severe and unjustified overall burden upon the right to vote, or is intended to disadvantage a particular class.

=== Dissent ===
Justice David Souter, joined by Justice Ruth Bader Ginsburg, filed a dissenting opinion, which would have declared the voter ID laws unconstitutional. Souter argued that Indiana had the burden of producing actual evidence of the existence of fraud, as opposed to relying on abstract harms, before imposing "an unreasonable and irrelevant burden on voters who are poor and old."

Justice Stephen Breyer also filed a dissenting opinion arguing that Indiana's law was unconstitutional. While he spoke approvingly of some voter ID laws, he found that Indiana's procedures for acquiring an ID were too burdensome and costly for some low income or elderly voters.

== Impact ==
Following the ruling critics suggested the court's conservative majority has "become increasingly hostile to voters" by siding with Indiana's voter identification laws which tend to "disenfranchise large numbers of people without driver's licenses, especially poor and minority voters". Senator Al Franken criticized the ruling for "eroding individual rights".

After the Supreme Court affirmed Indiana's law, states have adopted voter identification laws at an increasing rate. It also spurred research focused on voter ID laws and voter advocacy. Some research is centered on the timing of states' adoption of voter ID laws, while other research is on the partisanship of such laws.
