= United States v. Santos =

- Supreme Court of the United States

Argued October 3, 2007 Decided June 2, 2008
- Full case name: United States v. Santos
- Citations: 553 U.S. 507 (more)

Holding
- The rule of lenity requires that the federal money-laundering statute's use of the inherently-ambiguous term "proceeds" be read in the light favorable to the accused. Here, that means it includes "profit" and not "receipts."

Court membership
- Chief Justice John Roberts Associate Justices John P. Stevens · Antonin Scalia; Anthony Kennedy · David Souter; Clarence Thomas · Ruth Bader Ginsburg; Stephen Breyer · Samuel Alito

Case opinions
- Plurality: Scalia, joined by Souter, Ginsburg; Thomas (not Part IV)
- Concurrence: Stevens (in judgment)
- Dissent: Breyer
- Dissent: Alito, joined by Roberts, Kennedy, Breyer

United States v. Santos, 553 U.S. 507 (2008), was a United States Supreme Court case in which the court held that the rule of lenity requires that the federal money-laundering statute's use of the inherently-ambiguous term "proceeds" be read in the light favorable to the accused. Here, that means it includes criminal "profit" and not criminal "receipts."

== Background ==
In an illegal lottery run by Santos (the first defendant), runners took commissions from the bets they gathered, and some of the rest of the money was paid as salary to Diaz (the second defendant) and other collectors and to the winning gamblers. Based on these payments to runners, collectors, and winners, Santos was convicted of, among other things, violating the federal money-laundering statute, 18 U.S.C. §1956, which prohibits the use of the "proceeds" of criminal activities for various purposes, including engaging in, and conspiring to engage in, transactions intended to promote the carrying on of unlawful activity. Based on his receipt of salary, Diaz pleaded guilty to conspiracy to launder money. The Seventh Circuit Court of Appeal affirmed the convictions.

On collateral review, the federal District Court ruled that, under intervening Circuit precedent interpreting the word "proceeds" in the federal money-laundering statute, it applies only to transactions involving criminal profits, not criminal receipts. Finding no evidence that the transactions on which respondents' money-laundering convictions were based involved lottery profits, the court vacated those convictions. The Seventh Circuit affirmed.

== Opinion of the court ==
The Supreme Court heard oral arguments on October 3, 2007. It issued an opinion on June 2, 2008. Commentators thought the period of time between the arguments and the opinion was notably long, especially because cases that were expected to be more contentious (such as Medellín v. Texas) came much earlier.
