= Rothgery v. Gillespie County =

- Supreme Court of the United States

Argued March 17, 2008 Decided June 23, 2008
- Full case name: Walter A. Rothgery, Petitioner v. Gillespie County, Texas
- Docket no.: 07-440
- Citations: 554 U.S. 191 (more) 128 S. Ct. 2578; 171 L. Ed. 2d 366; 2008 U.S. LEXIS 5057; 76 U.S.L.W. 4520; 21 Fla. L. Weekly Fed. S 429

Case history
- Prior: 413 F. Supp. 2d 806 (W.D. Tex. 2006); affirmed, 491 F.3d 293 (5th Cir. 2007).
- Subsequent: On remand, 537 F.3d 716 (5th Cir. 2008).

Holding
- A criminal defendant’s initial appearance before a magistrate judge, where he learns the charge against him and his liberty is subject to restriction, marks the initiation of adversary judicial proceedings that trigger attachment of the Sixth Amendment right to counsel. Attachment does not also require that a prosecutor (as distinct from a police officer) be aware of that initial proceeding or involved in its conduct.

Court membership
- Chief Justice John Roberts Associate Justices John P. Stevens · Antonin Scalia; Anthony Kennedy · David Souter; Clarence Thomas · Ruth Bader Ginsburg; Stephen Breyer · Samuel Alito

Case opinions
- Majority: Souter, joined by Roberts, Stevens, Scalia, Kennedy, Ginsburg, Breyer, Alito
- Concurrence: Roberts, joined by Scalia
- Concurrence: Alito, joined by Roberts, Scalia
- Dissent: Thomas

Rothgery v. Gillespie County, 554 U.S. 191 (2008), is a United States Supreme Court case in which the Court held that a criminal defendant's initial appearance before a magistrate judge, where he learns the charge against him and his liberty is subject to restriction, marks the initiation of adversary judicial proceedings that trigger attachment of the Sixth Amendment right to counsel. Attachment does not also require that a prosecutor (as distinct from a police officer) be aware of that initial proceeding or involved in its conduct.

== Background ==
Texas police had relied on erroneous information that Rothgery had a previous felony conviction to arrest him as a felon in possession of a firearm. The officers brought Rothgery before a magistrate judge, as required by state law, for a so-called “article 15.17 hearing,” at which the Fourth Amendment probable-cause determination was made, bail was set, and Rothgery was formally apprised of the accusation against him.

After the hearing, the magistrate judge committed Rothgery to jail, and he was released after posting a surety bond. Rothgery had no money for a lawyer and made several unheeded oral and written requests for appointed counsel. He was subsequently indicted and rearrested, his bail was increased, and he was jailed when he could not post the bail. Subsequently, Rothgery was assigned a lawyer, who assembled the paperwork that prompted the indictment's dismissal.

Rothgery then brought this 42 U.S.C. §1983 action against the county, claiming that if it had provided him a lawyer within a reasonable time after the article 15.17 hearing, he would not have been indicted, rearrested, or jailed. He asserted that the county's unwritten policy of denying appointed counsel to indigent defendants out on bond until an indictment is entered violated his Sixth Amendment right to counsel.

The District Court granted the County summary judgment, and the Fifth Circuit Court of Appeals affirmed, considering itself bound by Circuit precedent to the effect that the right to counsel did not attach at the article 15.17 hearing because the relevant prosecutors were not aware of, or involved in, Rothgery's arrest or appearance at the hearing, and there was no indication that the officer at Rothgery's appearance had any power to commit the State to prosecute without a prosecutor's knowledge or involvement.

== Opinion of the Court ==
In an 8 to 1 decision delivered by Justice Souter, the Supreme Court vacated the Fifth Circuit's opinion, holding that "a criminal defendant’s initial appearance before a judicial officer, where he learns the charge against him and his liberty is subject to restriction, marks the start of adversary judicial proceedings that trigger attachment of the Sixth Amendment right to counsel." Justice Thomas dissented.
