= Exxon Shipping Co. v. Baker =

- Supreme Court of the United States

Argued February 27, 2008 Decided June 25, 2008
- Full case name: Exxon Shipping Company, et al. v. Grant Baker, et al.
- Docket no.: 07-219
- Citations: 554 U.S. 471 (more) 128 S. Ct. 2605; 171 L. Ed. 2d 570

Holding
- No more than a one-to-one ratio between compensatory and punitive damages is generally appropriate in maritime cases, absent intentional wrongdoing.

Court membership
- Chief Justice John Roberts Associate Justices John P. Stevens · Antonin Scalia; Anthony Kennedy · David Souter; Clarence Thomas · Ruth Bader Ginsburg; Stephen Breyer · Samuel Alito

Case opinions
- Majority: Souter, joined by Roberts, Scalia, Kennedy, Thomas; Stevens, Ginsburg, Breyer (Parts I, II, and III)
- Concurrence: Scalia, joined by Thomas
- Concur/dissent: Stevens
- Concur/dissent: Ginsburg
- Concur/dissent: Breyer
- Alito took no part in the consideration or decision of the case.

Laws applied
- U.S. Const. amend. V Restatement (Second) of Torts

Exxon Shipping Co. v. Baker, 554 U.S. 471 (2008), was a case decided by the Supreme Court of the United States. The Court ruled in a 5-3 decision that the punitive damages awarded to the victims of the Exxon Valdez oil spill should be reduced from $2.5 billion to $500 million.

The case was received by the Supreme Court of the United States from an appeal from the United States Court of Appeals for the Ninth Circuit. The Ninth Circuit had also ruled that Exxon could be held liable for the reckless conduct of the ship's captain, Joseph J. Hazelwood, who had left the bridge during the disaster and had been drinking vodka that evening. The Supreme Court was split 4–4 on the question of whether Exxon was liable for Hazelwood's action. The result of the split is that the Ninth Circuit's ruling on Exxon's respondeat superior liability for Hazelwood's conduct remains since Hazelwood acted in a managerial capacity under the Restatement (Second) of Torts Section 909(c) approach to punitive damages.

After considering the punitive damage policies of foreign nations, the Court reasoned that although punitive damages were warranted, they may not exceed what Exxon already paid to compensate victims for economic losses, which was about US$500 million. It held that a one-to-one ratio between punitive and compensatory damages was "a fair upper limit" in maritime cases that involved recklessness, compared to the lower liability of negligence or the higher liability of intentional conduct. Its reasoning, "The real problem, it seems, is the stark unpredictability of punitive awards," frustrates the goal of punitive damages, deterring reprehensible conduct, because predictable damages create an incentive to continue dangerous misconduct if the personal injury liability is less than the potential profit, as on the Ford Pinto. It suggested giving a "bad man" the chance to look ahead and to calculate the consequences of doing or not doing a bad act will deter harmful actions. He suggests the upper limits on punitive damages should be as predictable as the legislative range of criminal sentences, but no minimum for punitive damages were discussed.

Justice David Souter wrote for the majority, joined in full by Chief Justice John Roberts and Justices Antonin Scalia, Anthony Kennedy, and Clarence Thomas. Justice Samuel Alito took no part in the decision because he owns stock in ExxonMobil.

Justice Stevens wrote a separate opinion concurring in part and dissenting in part. His dissent advocated judicial restraint because Congress has chosen to regulate maritime tort law. Stevens wrote that the trial court award of $2.5 billion in punitive damages was not an abuse of discretion and should have been affirmed.

Of this reasoning, Boston University law professor Keith Hylton said, "The court's elaborate and lengthy argument for the one-to-one ratio is troubling for several reasons. First, the whole discussion was largely unnecessary if the court really wanted to limit its decision to maritime cases. The court's majority appears to be trying to make the case for imposing the one-to-one ratio as a default rule in ordinary civil cases."
