= Giles v. California =

- Supreme Court of the United States

Argued April 22, 2008 Decided June 25, 2008
- Full case name: Dwayne Giles v. California
- Docket no.: 07-6053
- Citations: 554 U.S. 353 (more) 128 S. Ct. 2678; 171 L. Ed. 2d 488

Case history
- Prior: Vacated, 40 Cal.4th 833 (2007)

Holding
- For statements to be admitted under the forfeiture exception to the confrontation right, the defendant must have intended to make the witness unavailable for trial.

Court membership
- Chief Justice John Roberts Associate Justices John P. Stevens · Antonin Scalia; Anthony Kennedy · David Souter; Clarence Thomas · Ruth Bader Ginsburg; Stephen Breyer · Samuel Alito

Case opinions
- Majority: Scalia, joined by Roberts, Thomas, Alito; Souter, Ginsburg (all but Part II–D–2)
- Concurrence: Thomas
- Concurrence: Alito
- Concurrence: Souter (in part), joined by Ginsburg
- Dissent: Breyer, joined by Stevens, Kennedy

Laws applied
- U.S. Const. amends. VI, XIV

Giles v. California, 554 U.S. 353 (2008), was a case decided by the Supreme Court of the United States that held that for testimonial statements to be admissible under the forfeiture exception to hearsay, the defendant must have intended to make the witness unavailable for trial.

== Factual background ==
Dwayne Giles was charged with murdering his girlfriend. During the trial, prosecutors were able to introduce statements made by Giles' girlfriend to police about a domestic violence incident between her and Giles. Generally, the girlfriend's statements to the police would be inadmissible as out-of-court hearsay, but the testimony was admitted due to an exception to the hearsay rule which allows the admission of out-of-court statements by a witness when the defendant has made that witness unavailable to testify in court. Giles was convicted, and his conviction was affirmed by the California Supreme Court. The court reasoned that the report of domestic violence was admissible under the forfeiture rule codified in California Evidence Code § 1370 because Giles had presumably made the declarant unavailable by murdering her. The Supreme Court granted certiorari.

== Majority opinion ==
In a majority opinion by Justice Scalia, the Court held that a defendant only forfeited his confrontation rights when he intended to procure the unavailability of the witness. The Court examined the history of the common law forfeiture right, finding that every case since 1666 required that the defendant intend to make the witness unavailable for trial. The Court noted that subsequent history also still required an intent element, with only a few modern exceptions.

The decision of the California Supreme Court was vacated and the case was remanded for further proceedings.

== Concurring opinions ==
=== Justice Thomas' concurrence ===
In his concurring opinion, Justice Thomas argued that the domestic violence report by the victim to the police was not testimonial and thus not barred by the confrontation clause.

=== Justice Alito's concurrence ===
In his concurring opinion, Justice Alito questioned whether the statements at issue were actually testimonial in nature.

=== Justice Souter's concurrence in part ===
In an opinion concurring in part joined by Justice Ginsburg, Justice Souter agreed with the Court's historical analysis, but stressed as most persuasive the idea that finding forfeiture for crimes like the one at issue was too circular. In the present case, for the victim's statements to be let in, it would need to be shown (in a preliminary hearing by a preponderance of the evidence) that the defendant had killed her, even though that was the very crime for which he was being tried.

== Dissenting opinion ==
In a dissenting opinion joined by Justices Stevens and Kennedy, Justice Breyer argued that the defendant's knowledge that murdering his girlfriend would make her unavailable to testify should have been enough to fulfill the intent requirement of the majority opinion.

== Impact ==
Giles has been criticized as hindering prosecutions for domestic violence. Commentators have argued that Giles, however, still allows courts to infer intent to silence the victim from the dynamics of the abusive relationship.

== See also ==
- List of United States Supreme Court cases, volume 554
