= Gall v. United States =

- Supreme Court of the United States

Argued October 2, 2007 Decided December 10, 2007
- Full case name: Brian Gall v. United States of America
- Docket no.: 06-7949
- Citations: 552 U.S. 38 (more) 128 S. Ct. 586; 169 L. Ed. 2d 445, 2007 U.S. LEXIS 13083
- Argument: Oral argument

Case history
- Prior: Sentence of 36 months probation vacated by the Eighth Circuit, 446 F.3d 884 (8th Cir. 2006).

Holding
- The federal appeals courts may not presume that a sentence falling outside the range recommended by the Federal Sentencing Guidelines is unreasonable.

Court membership
- Chief Justice John Roberts Associate Justices John P. Stevens · Antonin Scalia; Anthony Kennedy · David Souter; Clarence Thomas · Ruth Bader Ginsburg; Stephen Breyer · Samuel Alito

Case opinions
- Majority: Stevens, joined by Roberts, Scalia, Kennedy, Souter, Ginsburg, Breyer
- Concurrence: Scalia
- Concurrence: Souter
- Dissent: Thomas
- Dissent: Alito

Laws applied
- 18 U.S.C. § 3553(a); United States v. Booker, 543 U.S. 220 (2005)

Gall v. United States, 552 U.S. 38 (2007), was a decision by the United States Supreme Court, which held that the federal appeals courts may not presume that a sentence falling outside the range recommended by the Federal Sentencing Guidelines is unreasonable. Applying this rule to the case at hand, it upheld a sentence of 36 months' probation imposed on a man who pleaded guilty to conspiracy to distribute ecstasy in the face of a recommended sentence of 30 to 37 months in prison.

== Facts ==
Brian Gall was a sophomore at the University of Iowa when he befriended Luke Rinderknecht, who got Gall into selling ecstasy. Over the course of seven months, Gall made over $30,000 selling the drug. Then he stopped using ecstasy, graduated from college, moved to Arizona, got a job in the construction industry, and then became a master carpenter in Colorado. He had not used any illegal drugs since graduating from college.

While Gall was living in Arizona, federal agents approached him as part of an investigation into the drug conspiracy. He admitted participating in it for a brief time, and the agents moved on with their investigation. A year and a half after the agents approached Gall, Gall was indicted as part of an ongoing drug distributing ring that lasted from 1996 until 2002. By this time, Gall had been away from the drug ring for over three years. When the indictment came down, Gall returned to Iowa, surrendered to authorities, and was released on his own recognizance pending trial. While awaiting trial, Gall began his own contracting business, making profits of $2,000 per month in his first year. Gall was represented by attorney Marc Milavitz from Boulder, Colorado.

Gall struck a plea bargain with the Government, stipulating that he was responsible for the equivalent under the federal sentencing guidelines of 87.5 kilograms of marijuana. (This was relevant for sentencing purposes.) The Government acknowledged that Gall had withdrawn from the conspiracy in September 2000. The probation office also concluded (again, for sentencing purposes) that Gall was never an organizer or leader in the conspiracy, that his offense did not involve the use of weapons, and that he had no significant criminal history. The probation officer's report also pointed out that Gall had always been candid with the Government, but that his information was not useful to the investigators. Ultimately the probation officer recommended a sentence of 30 to 37 months.

At the sentencing hearing, several witnesses testified to Gall's good character. The defense reminded the court that two of Gall's accused codefendants had been sentenced to 30 and 35 months, respectively, and neither of them had voluntarily withdrawn from the conspiracy as Gall had. Although the Government's attorney urged the court to impose a sentence within the range recommended by the probation office, U.S. District Judge Robert W. Pratt ultimately imposed a sentence of 36 months' probation, explaining that it had considered the purposes of punishment and how a probation-only sentence would further those goals. The Government then appealed the sentence.

The Eighth Circuit vacated and remanded the sentence. As circuit precedent required at the time, the court noted that the district court had not justified the sentence adequately in light of the proportional variation from the bottom end of the Guidelines range. Because Gall's probation-only sentence was, in effect, a 100% downward variation from the Guidelines range, the court reasoned, it had to be justified by extraordinary circumstances, circumstances that were not present in Gall's case. After Claiborne v. the United States terminated with the unexpected premature death of the defendant, in that case, the Supreme Court agreed to hear Gall's case in order to clarify how the lower federal courts should handle sentences falling outside the Guidelines range.

== Majority opinion ==
After United States v. Booker, 543 U.S. 220 (2005), the Federal Sentencing Guidelines are merely one of seven factors federal district courts must look to when imposing sentences, and federal appellate courts must review those sentences for "reasonableness." "Our explanation of 'reasonableness' review in the Booker opinion made it pellucidly clear that the familiar abuse-of-discretion standard of review now applies to appellate review of sentencing decisions." At the same time, while the Guidelines are one factor among many, they remain the product of empirical study of thousands of sentencing decisions over a quarter of a century. Accordingly, while sentences that fall farther outside the Guidelines range must be justified with appropriate reference to the other factors, no "rigid mathematical formula" can dictate the precise extent of that justification. Such a formula smacks of a presumption of unreasonableness for sentences imposed outside the Guidelines range, an approach the Court rejects and that the Government had conceded was inconsistent with Booker.

With respect to the sentence the district court had imposed on Gall, it is of course true that custodial sentences are qualitatively more harsh than noncustodial ones, even taking into account the restrictions on freedom that any program of probation will entail. Yet the Court concluded that it was nearly unworkable to arrive at "some ascertainable method of assigning percentages to various justifications" district courts might proffer for various sentences. More importantly, however, was that the proportionality review the Eighth Circuit had employed effectively imposed a greater standard of review on some sentences than on others. Such an approach is inconsistent with an abuse-of-discretion standard of review that the Court in Booker and again in Rita v. United States had held should apply.

Turning to the particular facts of this case, the Court commented that the district judge had committed no significant procedural error. He correctly calculated the Guidelines range, considered the statutory factors, and "thoroughly documented his reasoning." In particular, the judge did not ignore the seriousness of the offense. To be sure, he did not specifically recite the adverse health effects that ecstasy presents. Yet the prosecutor did not urge those adverse health consequences as a basis for imposing the sentence it felt was reasonable. "It was not incumbent upon the District Judge to raise every conceivably relevant issue on his own initiative." Moreover, the probation-only sentence in this case promotes respect for the law. Seven of the eight defendants in the case received prison terms. Gall did not because, as the district judge explained, "a sentence of imprisonment may work to promote not respect, but derision, of the law if the law is viewed merely as a means to dispense harsh punishment without taking into account the real conduct and circumstances in sentencing." Finally, Gall understandably received a more lenient sentence because he withdrew from the conspiracy while the other defendants did not.

The Court also held that the sentence was substantively reasonable. Virtually no conspiracy defendants voluntarily withdraw; Gall did, and did so years before he even knew he was the target of a federal investigation. In the Court's eyes, this was a sign of genuine rehabilitation. "Compared to a case where the offender's rehabilitation occurred after he was charged with a crime, the District Court here had greater justification for believing Gall's turnaround was genuine, as distinct from a transparent attempt to build a mitigation case." The Eighth Circuit had faulted the district court for taking into account Gall's youth at the time of the crime; the Supreme Court noted that such a consideration was permissible as part of the "history and characteristics of the defendant." The Government had never contended that a probation-only sentence was inappropriate in a case such as Gall's; in fact, it had conceded that such a sentence might sometimes be appropriate. These differing policy choices were incompatible with an abuse-of-discretion review; hence, the Eighth Circuit's decision could not stand.

== Concurring opinions ==
Justice Antonin Scalia reiterated his view that substantive reasonableness review was incompatible with the Sixth Amendment, but concurred out of concerns for stare decisis.

Justice David Souter urged Congress to "reestablish[] a system of mandatory sentencing guidelines, but provid[e] for jury findings of all facts necessary to set the upper range of sentencing discretion."

== Dissenting opinions ==
Justice Clarence Thomas dissented for the same reason he did in Kimbrough v. United States.

Justice Samuel Alito dissented because he believed that district courts should be permitted to give "some significant weight" to the Guidelines "in making a sentencing decision." This belief flowed from his reading of United States v. Booker—a decision he did not participate in writing because it was issued before he joined the Court—because to fail to do so would ignore Congress's directive to not only "consult" the Guidelines but to "take [them] into account." Appellate courts, in turn, must be able to police compliance with this directive by forcing district courts to reevaluate sentences that stray too far from the Guidelines range. "It is unrealistic to think that this goal can be achieved over the long term if sentencing judges need only give lip service to the Guidelines."

== See also ==
- List of United States Supreme Court cases, volume 552
