= Department of Revenue of Kentucky v. Davis =

- Supreme Court of the United States

Argued November 5, 2007 Decided May 19, 2008
- Full case name: Department of Revenue of Kentucky, et al. v. George W. Davis, et ux.
- Docket no.: 06-666
- Citations: 553 U.S. 328 (more) 128 S. Ct. 1801; 170 L. Ed. 2d 685; 2008 U.S. LEXIS 4312; 76 U.S.L.W. 4288; 21 Fla. L. Weekly Fed. S 227

Case history
- Prior: On Writ of Certiorari to the Court of Appeals of Kentucky.

Holding
- A state exempting the interest on its bonds from residents' taxable income while taxing the interest earned on the bonds of other states is not unconstitutional discrimination under the Dormant Commerce Clause.

Court membership
- Chief Justice John Roberts Associate Justices John P. Stevens · Antonin Scalia; Anthony Kennedy · David Souter; Clarence Thomas · Ruth Bader Ginsburg; Stephen Breyer · Samuel Alito

Case opinions
- Plurality: Souter, joined by Stevens, Breyer; Roberts, Ginsburg (all but Part III–B); Scalia (all but Parts III–B and IV)
- Concurrence: Stevens
- Concurrence: Roberts (in part)
- Concurrence: Scalia (in part)
- Concurrence: Thomas (in judgment)
- Dissent: Kennedy, joined by Alito
- Dissent: Alito

Department of Revenue of Kentucky v. Davis, 553 U.S. 328 (2008), is a United States Supreme Court case in which the Court upheld a Kentucky law that provides a preferential tax break to Kentucky residents who invest in bonds issued by the state and its municipalities (municipal bonds). The Court held in a 7–2 vote that the State of Kentucky does not engage in unconstitutional discrimination against interstate commerce by exempting the interest on its bonds from residents' taxable income while taxing the interest earned on the bonds of other states. The case has national implications because thirty-six (36) states have tax schemes similar to the one at issue in Kentucky.

== Background ==
George and Catherine Davis sued the State of Kentucky under the legal theory that the State of Kentucky violated the Dormant Commerce Clause, a legal implication of the Commerce Clause, by providing a differential tax treatment to gains earned from investments in municipal bonds from Kentucky versus other states.

== Opinion of the Court ==
The majority opinion stated that the Kentucky tax scheme benefited a clearly public issuer, while treating all private issuers exactly the same. There was no forbidden discrimination because Kentucky, as a public entity, did not have to treat itself as being "substantially similar" to the other bond issuers in the market. The Kentucky tax scheme was constitutional because the Commonwealth's direct participation favored, not local private entrepreneurs, but the Commonwealth and local governments.
