= Mistretta v. United States =

- Supreme Court of the United States

Argued October 5, 1988 Decided January 18, 1989
- Full case name: John Mistretta v. United States
- Citations: 488 U.S. 361 (more) 109 S. Ct. 647; 102 L. Ed. 2d 714; 1989 U.S. LEXIS 434; 57 U.S.L.W. 4102

Case history
- Prior: Cert. before judgment to the United States Court of Appeals for the Eighth Circuit

Holding
- The portion of the Sentencing Reform Act of 1984 establishing the U.S. Sentencing Commission did not violate separation of powers because although Congress cannot generally delegate its legislative power to another branch, the nondelegation doctrine does not prevent Congress from obtaining assistance from coordinate branches.

Court membership
- Chief Justice William Rehnquist Associate Justices William J. Brennan Jr. · Byron White; Thurgood Marshall · Harry Blackmun; John P. Stevens · Sandra Day O'Connor; Antonin Scalia · Anthony Kennedy

Case opinions
- Majority: Blackmun, joined by Rehnquist, White, Marshall, Stevens, O'Connor, Kennedy; Brennan (all but n. 11)
- Dissent: Scalia

Laws applied
- U.S. Const. Art. III

Mistretta v. United States, 488 U.S. 361 (1989), is a case decided by the United States Supreme Court concerning the constitutionality of the United States Sentencing Commission.

== Background ==
Federal sentencing has historically been understood as a shared responsibility among the legislative, judicial, and executive branches rather than the exclusive domain of any one branch. Congress defines crimes and establishes statutory sentencing ranges, while judges determine the appropriate sentence within those ranges. The development of parole further divided sentencing authority by granting executive officials discretion to determine the effective duration of imprisonment.

Appellate courts gave substantial deference to sentencing judges because they were considered better positioned to determine appropriate punishment, while parole decisions were also treated as highly discretionary and left largely to the judgment of correctional officials. As theories about recidivism started to receive more attention the social value of long prison sentences was called into question, confidence in rehabilitation declined and concerns about sentencing disparities increased. Congress adopted reforms such as sentencing institutes, parole guidelines, and the Parole Commission and Reorganization Act of 1976 to improve the fairness and consistency of parole outcomes.

John Mistretta was indicted in the United States District Court for the Western District of Missouri for allegedly selling cocaine. He moved to have the United States Federal Sentencing Guidelines, which had been established under the Sentencing Reform Act of 1984, declared unconstitutional because it delegated excessive authority by Congress, resulting in a violation of separation of powers.

After the motion was denied, Mistretta pleaded guilty to one count of conspiracy and agreement to sell cocaine. He was sentenced principally to serve 18 months in prison. He filed an appeal to the Eighth Circuit, but he and the government both petitioned for certiorari before judgment, and the Supreme Court granted the petitions.

== Issues presented ==
Was Congress's creation of a United States Sentencing Commission with the power to establish binding sentencing guidelines a constitutional delegation of authority?

== Decision ==
The Supreme Court held that the Commission and the guidelines represented a constitutional delegation of powers.

Justice Blackmun delivered the majority opinion. The Court held that, as society increases in complexity, Congress must delegate authority "under broad general directives." The broad delegation of power to the Commission was undoubtedly "sufficiently specific and detailed to meet constitutional requirements."

Congress charged the commission with specific goals, identified specific purposes that sentencing was to serve, and prescribed a particular tool in the guidelines. That and other guidance that Congress provided ensured that the commission was steered by "more than merely an 'intelligible principle' or minimal standards."

Turning to the separation of powers question, the Supreme Court considered Mistretta's objections to the location of the commission inside the judicial branch, the composition of the commission, and the president's ability to appoint and remove members of the commission but found none of these meritorious.

== Dissent ==
Dissenting, Justice Scalia believed the commission to be an unconstitutional delegation of legislative power by Congress to another branch because the guidelines established by the Sentencing Commission have the force of law: a judge who disregards them will be reversed. Justice Scalia noted that the guidelines were "heavily laden (or ought to be) with value judgments and policy assessments" rather than being merely technical. He also disputed the assertion by the Court's majority that the Sentencing Commission was in the judicial branch rather than the legislative branch, writing that the Commission "is not a court, does not exercise judicial power, and is not controlled by or accountable to members of the Judicial Branch."

Justice Scalia rejected the notion of an "independent agency" in the judicial branch because "unlike executive power, judicial and legislative powers have never been thought delegable. A judge may not leave the decision to his law clerk [and] Senators... may not send delegates to consider and vote upon bills in their place." The case, he asserted, was not about "commingling" of constitutional powers "but about the creation of a new Branch altogether, a sort of junior varsity Congress."

== See also ==
- List of United States Supreme Court cases, volume 488
- List of United States Supreme Court cases
- Lists of United States Supreme Court cases by volume
- List of United States Supreme Court cases by the Rehnquist Court
- United States v. Booker (2005)
- Blakely v. Washington (2004)
