= Criminal sentencing in the United States =

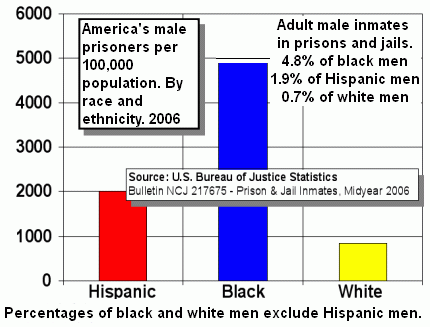
Rate of U.S. imprisonment per 100,000 population of adult males by race and ethnicity in 2006. Jails and prisons. On June 30, 2006, an estimated 4.8% of black non-Hispanic men were in prison or jail, compared to 1.9% of Hispanic men of any race, and 0.7% of white non-Hispanic men.

In the United States, sentencing law varies by jurisdiction. The jurisdictions in the US legal system are federal, state, regional, and county. Each jurisdictional entity has governmental bodies that create common, statutory, and regulatory law, although some legal issues are handled more often at the federal level, while other issues are the domain of the states. Civil rights, immigration, interstate commerce, and constitutional issues are subject to federal jurisdiction. Issues such as domestic relations, which includes domestic violence; marriage and divorce; corporations; property; contracts; and criminal laws are generally governed by states, unless there is federal preemption.

Sentences are typically determined by a judge, in a separate hearing, after the jury (or other finder of fact) has issued findings of fact and a guilty verdict. In some cases after the probation department has carried out a pre-sentence investigation. Juries generally have little involvement in sentencing, except in some death penalty cases (which are exceptionally rare).

== Trends in sentencing law ==
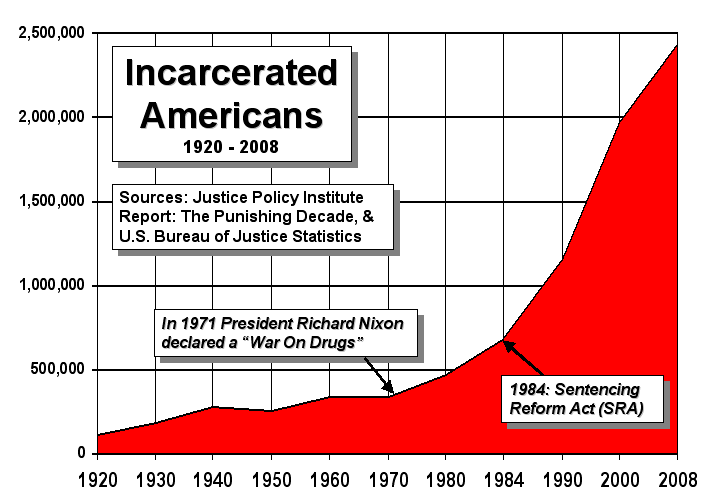
Total incarceration in the United States by year

In the 1970s, the length of incarceration had increased in response to the rising crime rates in the United States.

In 1987 the U.S. Sentencing Guidelines were created to establish sentencing policies and practices for the federal criminal justice system. The Guidelines prescribe a reduction of sentence time for most defendants who accept responsibility and plead guilty; further discounts are available to some defendants through fact bargaining, substantial assistance, and so on.

Life imprisonment increased by 83% between 1992 and 2003 due to the implementation of three strikes laws. Short-term sentencing, mandatory minimums, and guideline-based sentencing began to remove the human element from sentencing. They also required the judge to consider the severity of a crime in determining the length of an offender's sentence.

Federal court statistics from 2003 show that the average sentence given for offenses resolved by guilty plea was 54.7 months, while the average sentence for offenses resolved by trial was 153.7 months. The practice of giving much harsher sentences when a defendant chooses to exercise the right to a trial by a jury of his or her peers has been controversial, as is seen as a personal act of anger by the judge over "wasting court time."

== Determinate and indeterminate sentencing ==
=== Indeterminate sentencing ===
In some states, a judge will sentence criminals to an indeterminate amount of time in prison for certain crimes. This period is often between 1 and 3 years (on the short end) and 5–50 years on the upper end. The legislature generally sets a short, mandatory minimum sentence that an offender must spend in prison (e.g. one-third of the minimum sentence, or one-third of the high end of a sentence). The parole board then sets the actual date of prison release, as well as the rules that the parolee must follow when released.

During a long sentence, an offender can take full advantage of the programs that the prison has, including rehab for substance use disorders, anger management, mental health, and so on, so when the offender completes the rehab or program he may be released upon request from authorities with a lower risk of recidivism. This process tries to combat the tendency of prisoners leaving incarceration after a long sentence to go back to offending in short order, without any attempt at correcting their ways.

=== Determinate sentencing ===
Those given short sentences usually serve the full-time (do "day-for-day") as imposed by the judge, or might receive time off for good behavior, based on state or local rules and regulations.

In the mid-1970s, most state and federal prisons moved from long term to short term sentencing. Over time, though, state and federal authorities have gradually migrated their philosophies back toward long-term sentences. Many states use a mixture of the two; e.g., some offenders may receive sentences reduced by several months due to rehabilitation, counseling, and other programs, as well as good time.

== Sentencing of convicted murderers by US State ==
The United States does not have a specific guideline for sentencing murderers, including serial killers. When a killer is apprehended, they will be charged with murder, and if convicted can get life in prison or receive the death penalty, depending on in which state the murders took place. Generally speaking, each victim of a murder will merit a separate charge of murder against the offender, and as such, the killer could get a life sentence, a death sentence, or some other determinate or indeterminate sentence based upon the number of murders, the evidence presented, and any aggravating or mitigating circumstances present. Such a compounded sentence may be tailored to run consecutively, with one sentence beginning after completion of another, or concurrently, where all or most of several sentences are served together.

In 2002, the Supreme Court ruled in Atkins v. Virginia that the execution of adults (18 and over) with intellectual disabilities or with severe mental illness (depending on the state) was cruel and unconstitutional under the eighth amendment. Three years later in Roper v. Simmons (2005), the Supreme Court extended the ban of the death penalty against capital crimes committed by juveniles who were under 18 years of age at the time due to the developing brain not being developed enough to completely hold the individual accountable.

In the 2010 case of Graham v. Florida, the Supreme Court ruled that juveniles who committed crimes other than murder cannot be sentenced to life imprisonment without parole. In 2012, the court later ruled in Miller v. Alabama that offenders under the age of 18 must be eligible for parole if sentenced to life imprisonment even for those convicted of murder except if the child is declared to be "permanently incorrigible" meaning the child will never improve their behavior. However, in 2021, the Supreme Court in Jones v. Mississippi removed the requirement that judges must find a juvenile incorrigible to hand down life imprisonment without parole, making it easier for a judge to sentence a minor convicted of murder to life without parole.

State	Sentencing
Arizona	In Arizona, a person is guilty of murder if an offender knowingly and intentionally causes the death of a person. The murder must be premeditated. If an individual is found guilty of murder, there are three possible sentences: 35 years to life, life without parole, or the death penalty.
Florida	In Florida, a person is guilty of first degree murder when it is perpetrated from a premeditated design to result in the death of a human being. Murder is categorized as a capital offense; if convicted, the offender will receive either the death penalty or life in prison without parole. A unanimous vote of a twelve-person jury, is required to sentence a person to death if they are convicted of capital murder.
Hawaii	In Hawaii, a person is found guilty of second degree murder when they intentionally and knowingly cause the death of another person. If the person intentionally or knowingly kills more than one person, or kills a law enforcement officer, a judge, or a prosecutor in the line of, or as a result of, their duties, a witness to a crime, or a defendant to a corroborated crime, or if he hires another party to kill a certain individual, the person has met the criteria to be charged with first degree murder. The State of Hawaii has no death penalty. If they are found guilty, the maximum penalty is life imprisonment without parole.
Louisiana	Louisiana states that homicide in the first degree is killing of a human being with intent. There are other specific circumstances that may contribute, such as killing a police officer or a firefighter. Either of these offenses, or the killing of more than one person, is an automatic first degree charge. Louisiana provides for life imprisonment without parole or the death penalty for murder.
Massachusetts	In Massachusetts, first degree murder is defined as killing a person with premeditated intent to kill. The only possible sentence for first degree murder is life in prison without parole as Massachusetts does not have the death penalty. Second-degree murder carries a mandatory life sentence in prison, but with the possibility of parole after 15 years, which is the standard minimum non-parole period in the state for second-degree murder and most other offenses.
Michigan	In Michigan, a person is found guilty of first degree murder when murder is perpetrated by means of poison, lying in wait, or any other willful, deliberate, and premeditated killing. In Michigan, first degree murder carries an automatic life sentence without parole.
Nevada	In Nevada, first degree murder is the unlawful killing of a human being with malice aforethought, either expressed or implied. If a killer is found guilty with aggravating circumstances, such as killing someone via torture or killing a stranger with no apparent motive, they may receive either the death penalty or life without parole.
New York	In New York state, first-degree murder is reserved when a person with the intent causes the death of a first responder (police officer, firefighter, or emergency medical technician) in the line of duty. This also includes correctional, probation, and parole officers, witnesses to a crime and family members, and medical professionals (physician or nurse) who attempt to help save a person. The penalty for first-degree murder carries between fifteen years' imprisonment to life without parole. Second-degree murder is when a person has the intention of causing death to a person who does not meet any of the criteria that would warrant a first-degree murder. The maximum penalty for second-degree murder is life without parole. New York does not allow capital punishment.
Washington	In the state of Washington, a person is found guilty of first degree murder when there is a premeditated intent to cause the death of another person. Murder in the first degree is a class A felony. If a person is convicted of first degree murder, they will receive a life sentence. If an aggravating circumstance exists in addition to first degree murder, the defendant can be charged with aggravated first-degree murder, which carries only one possible sentence life without parole. Aggravating factors include the killing of a law enforcement officer, murder for hire, or murder committed during the course of kidnapping, rape, robbery, burglary, or arson, or for multiple murders.

== Criminal sentencing of women in the US ==
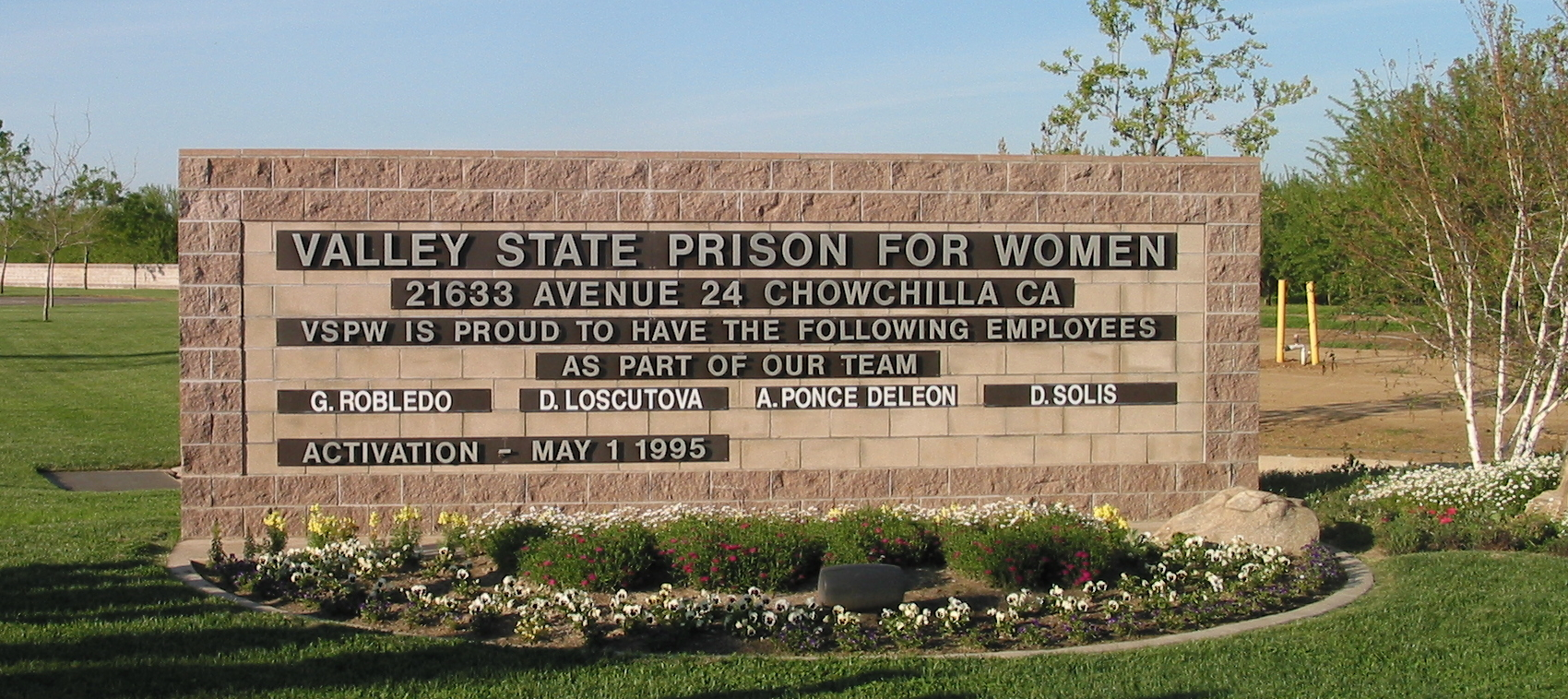
Central California Women's Facility is the largest female correctional facility in the United States. Its current occupancy is 2,640 occupants despite its designed capacity of 2,004 occupants.

The United States generates 30 percent of all incarcerated women in the world, despite only comprising five percent of the global female population. Multiple studies have been conducted to analyze the differences in the crimes committed by men and women, as well as the sentencing of such offenders.

Women have been found to on average receive lighter sentences and penalties than male defendants in the United States. However, the degree of preferential treatment varies by the type of offense committed. Women are less likely than male offenders to receive a prison sentence for property crimes and drug offenses. When female offenders do receive a prison sentence, research has found women receive shorter sentences than male offenders for the same offense. The level of preferential treatment shown to female offenders was lower when the offense went against perceived gender norms. Women who committed more "masculine crimes," such as violent offenses or crimes against children, were not treated preferentially during sentencing.

Within the scope of capital punishment, women are far less likely to receive a death sentence and even less likely to actually face execution. Between 1973 and 2012, women comprised only 2.1% of death sentences imposed at trial and merely 0.9% of persons executed. Women who are sentenced to death at trial are more likely to receive executive clemency than their male counterparts, despite their crime having more aggravating factors that may increase sentencing outcomes.

Researchers have developed theories that concentrate on the differences between the treatment of each gender by society. A possible explanation for disproportionate sentencing is the chivalry thesis which states that gendered stereotypes influence sentencing outcomes as women are considered childlike, less threatening, less dangerous, and not responsible for their behaviors. This theory also maintains that men are traditionally inclined to minimize the suffering of women as a result of their paternalistic desire and this behavior has been incorporated into the justice system as it is a male-dominated field. Judges primarily explained sentencing differentials as a result of childcare responsibilities that would create a larger social cost if mothers were incarcerated, illustrating direct applications of the chivalry thesis. Others argue the disparity in sentencing is merely the result of human error as a result of the dynamics of judicial decision-making. The focal concerns theory reaffirms this belief as this theory states that the sentencing disparity is the result of a judge's inability to spend a large amount of time on a single case and the incomplete information given to them minimizes their ability to make a fully informed decision. As a result, judges may unknowingly rely on generalizations of personal biases to guide sentencing decisions.

In an attempt to prevent preferential treatment to particular genders, races, ethnicities, or socio-economic classes, the Federal Sentencing Guidelines were enacted to create sentencing uniformity and equality. The enactment of these guidelines has since increased sentences given to women at trial; however, the disparity between male and female offenders persists as the internal biases influencing preferential sentencing have not been addressed.

== Criminal Sentencing and Incarceration of Blacks in the US ==
As of October 2023, 38.6% of individuals in the United States' prisons are black, even though they represent only 13.6% of the total population, according to the 2020 Census.

Studies have examined differences in sentencing for crimes committed by individuals of different races. One such study, conducted by Peter Lehmann and published in 2023, analyzed felony sentences across races, genders, and age groups. Lehmann examined data from noncapital felony cases in Florida circuit courts over a 12-year period. His research revealed that young black males were disproportionately subject to harsh sentencing. Another study titled "The Color of Mass Incarceration," conducted by Ronnie B. Tucker and published in 2016, found that in 2010, for every white woman incarcerated, three Black women were also imprisoned.

Moreover, studies examining federal sentencing data over the past two decades have concluded that men tend to receive more severe criminal sentences compared to women. Notably, these studies have also revealed that black men receive the most severe sentences, while white women consistently receive the most lenient sentences. Correspondingly, minority women, particularly those of Black and Hispanic backgrounds, experience the harshest outcomes of the female identifying demographic.

== See also ==
- History of mandatory sentencing in the United States
- History of United States Prison Systems
- United States constitutional sentencing law
- Federal Sentencing Guidelines
- Taylor v. United States
- United States Sentencing Commission
- United States v. Booker
