= Cunningham v. California =

- Supreme Court of the United States

Argued October 11, 2006 Decided January 22, 2007
- Full case name: John Cunningham v. People of the State of California
- Docket no.: 05-6551
- Citations: 549 U.S. 270 (more) 127 S. Ct. 856, 166 L.Ed.2d 856

Case history
- Prior: Defendant's conviction and sentence upheld by the California Court of Appeal; review denied by the California Supreme Court.

Holding
- The Sixth Amendment, as interpreted in Blakely v. Washington (2004), applies to California's determinate sentencing law, and requires that the facts necessary to support imposing the upper term of imprisonment under that scheme be submitted to a jury and proved beyond a reasonable doubt.

Court membership
- Chief Justice John Roberts Associate Justices John P. Stevens · Antonin Scalia; Anthony Kennedy · David Souter; Clarence Thomas · Ruth Bader Ginsburg; Stephen Breyer · Samuel Alito

Case opinions
- Majority: Ginsburg, joined by Roberts, Stevens, Scalia, Souter, Thomas
- Dissent: Kennedy, joined by Breyer
- Dissent: Alito, joined by Kennedy, Breyer

Laws applied
- U.S. Const. amend. VI

Cunningham v. California, 549 U.S. 270 (2007), is a decision by the Supreme Court of the United States in which the Court held, 6–3, that the sentencing standard set forward in Apprendi v. New Jersey (2000) applies to California's determinate sentencing law.

In California, a judge may choose one of three sentences for a crime—a low, middle, or high term. There must exist specific aggravating factors about the crime before a judge may impose the high term. Under the Apprendi rule, as explained in Blakely v. Washington, any fact that increases the punishment above that which the judge may impose without that fact must be found by a jury beyond a reasonable doubt. In People v. Black, the California Supreme Court rejected the argument that under Blakely, the jury must find the additional facts necessary for the judge to impose the high term under the DSL. In Cunningham, the U.S. Supreme Court overruled Black, ruling that Blakely applies to California's determinate sentencing scheme.

== Background ==
After a jury trial, Cunningham was convicted of continuous sexual abuse of a child in Contra Costa County Superior Court, California. Under California's Determinate Sentencing Law (DSL), the authorized sentences for this crime are either 6, 12, or 16 years. Under the DSL, the judge must conclude first, that there are aggravating facts, and second, that the aggravating facts outweigh any mitigating factors, before imposing the high term. In this case, at a post-trial hearing, the judge found by a preponderance of the evidence that Cunningham's victim was particularly vulnerable and that his conduct was violent, making him a danger to the community. The judge then concluded that this aggravating evidence outweighed the fact that Cunningham had no criminal history, and sentenced Cunningham to the high term of 16 years. The California Court of Appeal affirmed. The California Supreme Court denied review because it had recently held, in People v. Black, that the DSL was constitutional under Blakely v. Washington. Cunningham asked the U.S. Supreme Court to hear the case, and it agreed to do so.

=== California's Determinate Sentencing Law ===
The primary development in sentencing law that gave rise to this case was the shift away from indeterminate sentencing and toward determinate sentencing. Under an indeterminate sentencing scheme, statutory law provides for a wide range of authorized sentences, such as "five years to life" for burglary. The power to determine the length of time a criminal actually spends in prison rests with a parole board or other prison officials, rather than with the courts. In the 1970s, California replaced its indeterminate sentencing system with a determinate sentencing scheme. In a determinate sentencing scheme, statutory law fixes authorized sentences of discrete lengths, and requires courts rather than prison officials to justify which of those discrete sentences is appropriate in any given case.

California enacted its Determinate Sentencing Law (DSL) in 1977, in the hopes of achieving greater uniformity in sentencing and ensuring that punishment was proportional to crimes. For most crimes, the DSL specifies three authorized sentences—a low term, a middle term, and a high term. The trial judge was required to impose the middle term unless there were aggravating or mitigating circumstances—facts found by the trial judge to exist by a preponderance of the evidence and which must be placed on the record in open court. A group of California judges had come up with a nonexhaustive list of aggravating and mitigating factors; judges were also free to rely on any fact reasonably related to the crime. The DSL also forbade judges to rely on any fact that was already an element of the crime in order to impose the high term.

== Opinion of the Court ==
In Apprendi v. New Jersey, the Court ruled that any fact that increases a defendant's punishment above the statutory maximum punishment must be submitted to a jury and proved beyond a reasonable doubt. In Blakely v. Washington, the Court ruled that, for purposes of the Apprendi rule, the "statutory maximum" is the greatest sentence the judge may impose based solely on the facts found by the jury. Blakely and United States v. Booker, for example, involved sentencing schemes in which the judge was required to impose a sentence within a range determined both by the crime of conviction and additional facts. In those schemes, if the judge chose a sentence above that range, or chose one from a higher range, the facts that allowed the judge to do so had to be submitted to a jury and proved beyond a reasonable doubt.

Under California's DSL, the middle term is the "statutory maximum" sentence for Blakely purposes. The DSL required judges to impose the middle term unless aggravating factors were found to exist, and those aggravating factors by definition did not include any element of the crime. Thus, the maximum sentence the judge could impose based solely on the jury's findings was the middle term, not the high term.

Nevertheless, in People v. Black, the California Supreme Court held that the DSL survived Blakely intact because the DSL merely set forth a sentencing range within which the judge was allowed to exercise his traditional discretion to impose an appropriate sentence. The Black court concluded that the DSL was merely a legislative attempt to provide guidance to trial courts in selecting appropriate aggravating factors on which to base a high-term sentence. But this does not justify "shield[ing] a sentencing system from the force of" Blakely. The Black court also reasoned that the DSL did not violate Blakely because, overall, it reduced sentences vis-à-vis the indeterminate sentencing scheme. Furthermore, the Black court noted that under California law, sentencing enhancement, which are distinct from aggravating factors, did have to be proved beyond a reasonable doubt. These two differences, it reasoned, meant that the DSL survived Blakely. But Apprendi set forth a bright-line rule that did not tolerate "trivial" incursions in the name of preserving the "basic" jury-trial right of the criminal defendant.

Nor could the DSL survive because it was functionally indistinguishable from the post-Booker sentencing scheme in place for federal crimes. Just as federal judges have discretion to impose a "reasonable" sentence by referring to a set of broad criteria, the Black court reasoned, California trial judges have broad discretion to impose a sentence within a predetermined range. But this characterization of the DSL was not accurate, for California had adopted "sentencing triads, three fixed sentences with no ranges between them. Cunningham's sentencing judge had no discretion to select a sentence within the range of 6 to 16 years. Her instruction was to select 12 years, nothing less and nothing more, unless she found facts allowing the imposition of a sentence of 6 or 16 years. Factfinding to elevate a sentence from 12 to 16 years, our decisions make plain, falls within the province of the jury employing a beyond-a-reasonable-doubt standard, not the bailiwick of a judge determining where the preponderance of the evidence lies." The "reasonableness" standard operates within the Sixth Amendment constraint, not as a substitute for it.

It was up to California to tailor its sentencing scheme to conform with the Court's decision, just as other states had conformed their sentencing schemes to conform with Apprendi and Blakely. Some states allow the jury to make the necessary findings during trial; others do so in a post-trial sentencing hearing; still others "have chosen to permit judges genuinely to exercise broad discretion within a statutory range, which, everyone agrees, encounters no Sixth Amendment shoal."

== Dissenting opinion ==
Justice Samuel Alito saw no difference between the DSL and the post-Booker sentencing scheme in place for the federal courts. "Both sentencing schemes grant trial judges considerable discretion in sentencing; both subject the exercise of that discretion to appellate review for "reasonableness;" and both—the California law explicitly, and the federal scheme implicitly—require a sentencing judge to find some factor to justify a sentence above the minimum that could be imposed based solely on the jury's verdict." If the post-Booker scheme had won the approval of a majority of the Court, why should the DSL not also garner such a majority?

Alito pointed out that all members of the Court agreed that the indeterminate sentencing scheme in place for federal crimes would satisfy the Blakely rule, and that a purely advisory Guidelines system would do so as well. The characteristic that persuaded a majority of the Court to approve the current federal sentencing scheme, consisting of sentencing guidelines ranges from which trial judges were permitted to depart, was that all sentences were subject to appellate review for "reasonableness." All of these systems require trial judges to make factual findings on some level of generality. Under the Federal Sentencing Guidelines, these findings were somewhat specific; under the indeterminate sentencing scheme, they were not. Yet in both schemes the judge makes findings that allow them to impose an appropriate sentence.

Similarly, the DSL afforded California trial judges sentencing discretion with respect to the "general objectives of sentencing," which included protecting society, punishment, encouraging the defendant to lead a law-abiding life, deterring the defendant from committing other crimes and deterring others from committing crimes at all, incapacitating the defendant during his incarceration, providing restitution to victims, and promoting uniformity in overall sentences. The sentencing decisions of California trial judges, just as those of federal trial judges, were subject to review for "reasonableness."

In light of these similarities, Alito concluded that the majority's reasoning was flawed. A California trial judge's decision to impose a high-term sentence was not necessarily a fact-based decision; it could be entirely policy-based, and policy-based decisions have always been left to judges. Because the decision to impose a high-term sentence was not based on facts, the Apprendi rule did not apply to it. Even if they were, Alito felt that "reasonableness" review was a sufficient constraint on the power of trial judges to choose sentences within prescribed ranges. Some sentences, after all, will be found to be unreasonable, and hence unconstitutional, because they will not be sufficiently supported by appropriate facts. If the remedial majority in Booker approved this scheme for the federal system, it should also pass constitutional muster when used in California.

== Effect of the decision ==
Seventh Circuit Chief Judge Frank H. Easterbrook noted in an opinion that an argument that since Cunningham's decision, "district judges no longer may find facts that affect federal sentences ... has become popular." The Seventh Circuit rejected that argument:

Cunningham holds that California's determinate sentencing law violates the sixth amendment, as understood in [Apprendi, Blakely and Booker], by granting the judge rather than the jury the power to find facts that raise the maximum lawful sentence. [It is] contend[ed] that Cunningham applies to the federal Sentencing Guidelines as well as to California's system. ... [However,] Booker solved th[e] [federal sentencing guidelines'] constitutional problem by making the Guidelines advisory. Given that adjustment, findings of fact under the Guidelines no longer determine statutory maximum sentences. Cunningham therefore has no effect on post-Booker federal practice[,] [insofar as] District judges remain free, as the remedial portion of Booker instructs, to make findings of fact that influence sentences, provided that the sentence is constrained by the maximum set by statute for each crime.

United States v. Roti (7th Cir. 2007), Slip op. at 5–6.

== See also ==
- List of United States Supreme Court cases, volume 549
- List of United States Supreme Court cases
