= Mandatory sentencing =

Minimum penalties for crimes

Mandatory sentencing requires that people convicted of certain crimes serve a predefined term of imprisonment, removing the discretion of judges to take issues such as extenuating circumstances and a person's likelihood of rehabilitation into consideration when sentencing. Research shows the discretion of sentencing is effectively shifted to prosecutors, as they decide what charges to bring against a defendant. Mandatory sentencing laws vary across nations; civil law jurisdictions usually prescribe minimum and maximum sentences for every type of crime in explicit laws. They can be applied to crimes ranging from minor offences to extremely violent crimes including murder. In the United States, several mandatory sentencing laws have been overturned by the Supreme Court for being unconstitutional, and mandatory sentencing has resulted in prison terms that are considered extremely disproportionate compared to the crimes committed.

Mandatory sentences are considered a "tough on crime" approach that intend to serve as a general deterrence for potential criminals and repeat offenders, who are expected to avoid crime because they can be certain of their sentence if they are caught. However, studies have shown that the effects of mandatory sentencing are mixed, and that in some cases crime increases following their implementation. Mandatory sentencing is not cost-effective compared to other methods of reducing crime, and has been found to disproportionately impact Indigenous peoples and other minorities in several countries.

== History ==
=== North America ===
Throughout US history, prison sentences were primarily founded upon discretionary sentencing. Mandatory sentencing and increased punishment were enacted when the United States Congress passed the Boggs Act of 1951. The act made a first time cannabis possession offense a minimum of two to ten years with a fine up to $20,000; however, in 1970, the United States Congress repealed mandatory penalties for cannabis offenses. With the passage of the Anti-Drug Abuse Act of 1986 Congress enacted mandatory minimum sentences for drugs, including marijuana, with 2-3 years for a first offence and 5-10 years for a second. The Anti-Drug Abuse Act of 1986 also implemented mandatory sentencing for offences related to cocaine. In 1994, Safety Valve laws were created to reduce mandatory sentencing for certain nonviolent, non-managerial drug offenders with little or no criminal history.

Individual states in the US can have mandatory sentences. In 1994, California introduced a three-strikes law, which imposed a mandatory term of life-imprisonment for a third felony conviction; the law was intended to reduce crime by deterring repeated offenders. Examples of people who are considered to have received excessive punishments under such laws include Curtis Roberts, who was sentenced to life imprisonment with a non-parole period of 50 years for three non-violent thefts which combined only obtained $116, and Santos Reyes, who was sentenced to life imprisonment with a non-parole period of 29 years after he was convicted of perjury in relation to cheating on a drivers licence test. Reyes had previous convictions for burglary and armed robbery more than 11 years earlier, making the perjury charge his third strike.

Following their implementation in California, three-strike laws were subsequently adopted in many American jurisdictions. The state of Florida has a very strict minimum sentencing policy known as 10-20-Life, which includes the following minimums: 10 years' imprisonment for using a gun during a crime, 20 years' imprisonment for firing a gun during a crime, and 25 years' imprisonment in addition to any other sentence for shooting somebody, regardless of whether they survive or not.

Separate from each state's own courts, federal courts in the United States are guided by the Federal Sentencing Guidelines. When a guideline sentencing range is less than the statutory mandatory minimum, the latter prevails. Under the Controlled Substances Act, prosecutors have great power to influence a defendant's sentence and thereby create incentives for defendants to accept a plea agreement. For example, defendants with prior drug felonies are often subject to harsh mandatory minimums, but a prosecutor can exercise discretion to not file a prior felony information. Then the mandatory minimum will not be applied. United States federal juries are generally not allowed to be informed of the mandatory minimum penalties that may apply if the accused is convicted because the jury's role is limited to a determination of guilt or innocence. However, defense attorneys sometimes have found ways to impart this information to juries; for instance, it is occasionally possible, on cross-examination of an informant who faced similar charges, to ask how much time he was facing. It is sometimes deemed permissible because it is a means of impeaching the witness. However, in at least one state court case in Idaho, it was deemed impermissible.

In 2013, United States Attorney General Eric H. Holder, Jr. announced that the Justice Department would follow a new policy restricting mandatory minimum sentences in certain drug cases. The Washington Post reported in 2019 that some critics held this memo as responsible for overall more prosecutions dropped, a drop in drug enforcement agent morale, and fentanyl and heroin overdoses soaring. Attorney General Holder held that the charges placed on an individual should reflect the uniqueness of the case and consideration in assessing and fairly representing his/her given conduct. This purpose is to prevent recidivism. In Alleyne v. United States (2013) the Supreme Court held that increasing a sentence past the mandatory minimum requirement must be submitted by a jury and found factual beyond a reasonable doubt. It increases the burden on the prosecutor to show that the sentence is necessary for the individual crime by requiring that a mandatory minimum sentence be denied for a defendant unless they fulfill certain criteria.

Some mandatory sentence laws have been found to be unconstitutional by the Supreme Court of the United States. In 1976, mandatory death sentences were determined to be unconstitutional, following the decision in Woodson v. North Carolina. In 2005, United States v. Booker found that mandatory federal sentencing guidelines violated the Sixth Amendment right to a trial by jury. This resulted in the guidelines becoming advisory rather than mandatory. In 2012, the case of Miller v. Alabama ruled it is unconstitutional to sentence people under 18 to mandatory life-imprisonment without parole.

Mandatory sentencing in the US is more likely to affect minority groups. In US federal prisons, Black Americans sentenced under mandatory minimum drug laws grew from under 10% in 1984 to 28% by 1990, representing a significantly larger shift than found in the federal prison population in general. As of 2011, of the people convicted of an offense carrying a mandatory minimum punishment and who remained subject to that penalty at sentencing, 38.5 percent were Black, 31.8 percent were Hispanic, and 27.5 percent were White.

In Canada, life imprisonment and a period of parole ineligibility are mandatory for murder. The minimum parole ineligibility periods for first-degree murder are 25 years for an adult or youth tried and sentenced as an adult, and 10 years for a youth. Until 1961, murder in Canada was punishable only by death, provided that the offender was a sane adult. Until September 1, 1999, the National Defence Act specified a mandatory death sentence for certain acts (cowardice, desertion, unlawful surrender) if done traitorously.

=== Europe ===
Denmark has mandatory minimum sentences for murder (five years to life) and regicide (life in prison § 115), deadly arson is punished with imprisonment from 4 years to life, and for an illegal loaded gun one year in state prison.

In Germany, murder for pleasure, sexual gratification, greed or other base motives, by stealth or cruelly or by means that pose a danger to the public or to facilitate or cover up another offense is mandatorily punished by life imprisonment.

In Ireland, Acts of the Oireachtas specify a mandatory sentence of life imprisonment for murder and treason, and mandatory minimum sentences for various lesser offences. A mandatory minimum sentence may be truly mandatory or may be presumptive, giving a judge discretion to impose a lesser sentence in exceptional circumstances. Mandatory sentences have been challenged on grounds that they violate the separation of powers required by the constitution, by allowing the Oireachtas (legislature) to interfere in the judicial process. In 2012, the Supreme Court ruled that the mandatory sentence of life imprisonment for murder was constitutional. However, in 2019, it ruled that a mandatory minimum sentence had to apply for all offenders, not for certain classes of offenders. It struck out a sentence of five years for possession of a firearm, because it was truly mandatory only for a second offence, whereas it would have been presumptively mandatory for a first offence. A mandatory sentence for a second offence of drug trafficking was struck out in 2021 for similar reasons; the conviction was upheld but the sentence referred back to the Circuit Court for reconsideration.

In the United Kingdom, upon conviction for murder, the court must sentence the defendant to life imprisonment. The law requires that courts must set a minimum term before they become eligible for parole. For this purpose five "starting points" are in place that give guidance to a judge to impose a sentence in each different case of murder. These range from 12 years' imprisonment for cases of murder committed by a person under 18, to a whole life order, in cases that involve such "exceptionally" high aggravating factors, such as the murder of two or more persons, or the murder of a child following abduction or with sexual/sadistic motivation. The United Kingdom also has three other mandatory minimum sentences for certain offences, namely: a minimum of 7 years' imprisonment for a person over 18 convicted of trafficking, supplying or producing Class A drugs for the third or subsequent time; a minimum of 5 years' imprisonment (for a person over 18) or 3 years' imprisonment (for a person aged 16–17) for possession, purchase, acquisition, manufacture, transfer or sale of a prohibited firearm or weapon for the first or subsequent time; and a minimum of 3 years' imprisonment for a person over 18 convicted of a domestic burglary for the third or subsequent time.

A "three strikes" policy was introduced to the United Kingdom by the Conservative government in 1997. This legislation enacted a mandatory life sentence on a conviction for a second "serious" violent or sexual offence (i.e. "two strikes" law), a minimum sentence of seven years for those convicted for a third time of a drug trafficking offence involving a class A drug, and a mandatory minimum sentence of three years for those convicted for the third time of burglary. An amendment by the Labour opposition established that mandatory sentences should not be imposed if the judge considered it unjust. According to figures released by the British government in 2005, just three drug dealers and eight burglars received mandatory sentences in the next seven years, because judges thought a longer sentence was unjust in all other drug and burglary cases where the defendant was found guilty. However, in 2005 a new "two strikes" law became effective, requiring courts to presume that a criminal who commits his second violent or dangerous offence deserves a life sentence unless the judge is satisfied that the defendant is not a danger to the public. This resulted in far more life sentences than the 1997 legislation. In response to prison overcrowding, the law was changed in 2008 to reduce the number of such sentences being passed, by restoring judicial discretion and abolishing the presumption that a repeat offender is dangerous.

=== Oceania ===
In 1996, 12-month mandatory sentencing was introduced for third offences for burglary by Western Australia through amendments to the 1913 Criminal Code. In 1997, mandatory "three strikes" laws were introduced for property offences in the Northern Territory, which raised incarceration rates of Indigenous women by 223% in the first year. The mandatory sentencing laws caused controversy and sparked debate due to the laws discriminative impacts on Indigenous Australians. Property crime actually increased after the mandatory sentencing law was introduced, and decreased after it was repealed. A mandatory minimum sentence in Victoria for driving without a licence was abolished in 2010 after it was found to have no impact on reducing crime or protecting the community, though was found to increase strain on the criminal justice system.

New South Wales has two mandatory sentences. The Crimes Amendment (Murder of Police Officers) Bill 2011 introduced mandatory life sentence without parole for a person convicted of murdering a police officer. Also, the Crimes and Other Legislation (Assault and Intoxication) Amendment 2014 introduced mandatory minimum sentencing of 8 years for alcohol fuelled acts of violence, as a response to the cases of king hit assaults in Sydney. These laws were championed by NSW Premier Barry O'Farrell largely due to the wide media coverage of similar cases. In 2017, the government of Victoria introduced a "two-strike" policy, with a minimum six-year jail sentence for repeat violent offenders.

At the federal level, Australia also has legislation allowing mandatory prison sentences of between five and 25 years for people smuggling, in addition to a fine of up to $500,000, and forfeiture and destruction of the vessel or aircraft used in the offence. In early 2025, mandatory minimum penalties were introduced for numerous offences. These include minimums of one year for displaying a Nazi symbol (or performing a Nazi salute) in public, three years for terrorism financing, and six years for planning a terrorist attack. The Law Council of Australia criticised the capriciousness of these changes, noting that the Labor government had contradicted its own national policy platform of opposing mandatory sentencing.

In New Zealand, life imprisonment is mandatory for murder. Murders with certain aggravating factors have a mandatory 17-year non-parole period, instead of the default 10 years for life imprisonment. Since 2002, judges have the ability to overrule mandatory sentences where they would be deemed "manifestly unjust", such as in cases involving mercy killings and attempted suicide pacts. A three strikes law was introduced in 2010, though was repealed in 2022 over concerns including that the law was disproportionately affecting Māori people and had inconsistencies with New Zealand's Bill of Rights. However, following the conservative victory at the 2023 New Zealand general election, the three strikes laws were reinstated in 2024, though with some relaxed conditions including implementing a "manifestly unjust" exception to allow some judicial discretion.

=== Asia ===
In 1930, the city of Guangzhou, China enacted a mandatory death penalty for three-time offenders.

In India, murder committed by a convict serving a life sentence carries a mandatory death sentence. The mandatory death penalty provided in Section 31A of India Law is in the nature of minimum sentence in respect of repeat offenders of specified activities and for offences involving large quantities of specified categories of narcotic drugs. As of August 2005, aircraft hijacking also mandates use of the death penalty.

=== Middle East ===
In Israel, the Nazis and Nazi Collaborators (Punishment) Law mandates a death penalty for those found guilty of war crimes, crimes against humanity, or crimes against the Jewish people.

== Analysis and commentary ==
Studies show people are deterred from crime more effectively by increasing the chances of their conviction rather than increasing the sentence if they are convicted. In a hearing of the House Judiciary Committee, Judge Paul G. Cassell, from the United States District Court for the District of Utah, described mandatory sentencing as resulting in harsh sentencing and cruel and unusual punishment, stating that the sentencing requirements punish defendants "more harshly for crimes that threaten potential violence than for crimes that conclude in actual violence to victims". A hearing in 2009 heard testimony from the American Bar Association which stated that "Sentencing by mandatory minimums is the antithesis of rational sentencing policy". In 2004, the association called for the repeal of mandatory minimum sentences, stating that "there is no need for mandatory minimum sentences in a guided sentencing system." A 1997 study by the RAND Corporation found that in the US, mandatory minimums for cocaine offenses were not cost-effective in regards to either cocaine consumption or drug crime. Mandatory sentenced are often considered to create cases where sentences are considered extremely disproportionate to the crimes committed.

The Law Council of Australia and the Australian Law Reform Commission both consider mandatory sentencing to incur significant social and economic costs and to increase incarceration, though without a corresponding deterrent of or reduction in crime. Mandatory sentencing also removes the incentive to plead guilty as there will be no reduction in sentence duration from doing so. Accordingly, people are more likely to contest charges, placing additional financial burden on the criminal justice system and increased workloads for courts.

Some judges have expressed the opinion that mandatory minimum sentencing, especially in relation to alcohol-fueled violence, is not effective. In R v O'Connor, the High Court of Australia gave the opinion that when an person is intoxicated, there will likely be a change in their personality and behaviour, which will then affect their self-control; that, while a person may commit an act which is voluntary and intentional, it is not something that they would have done in a sober state. Intoxication is not a justification for criminal behaviour, but since an intoxicated person's decisions are less likely to be shaped by rational assessment of consequences than those of a sober person, deterrence is likely to be less effective for intoxicated people. Mandatory sentencing is also considered to be completely ineffective at reducing crimes of passion that are not premeditated.

Research indicates that mandatory minimum sentencing effectively shifts discretion from judges to the prosecutors. Prosecutors decide what charges to bring against a defendant, and they can "stack the deck", which involves over-charging a defendant to get them to plead guilty. Since prosecutors are part of the executive branch, and the judicial branch has almost no role in the sentencing, the checks and balances of the democratic system are removed, thus diluting the notion of separation of powers. Opponents of mandatory sentencing argue that it is the proper role of a judge, not a prosecutor, to apply discretion given the particular facts of a case (e.g., whether a drug defendant was a kingpin or low-level participant, or whether sex offender registration is an appropriate measure for a given crime or individual). When prosecutors apply discretion, they tend to invoke sentencing disparities when choosing among a variety of statutes with different sentencing consequences. In addition to fairness arguments, some opponents believe that treatment is more cost-effective than long sentences. They also cite a survey indicating that the public now prefers judicial discretion to mandatory minimums.

In 2015, a number of United States reformers, including the ACLU, the Center for American Progress, Families Against Mandatory Minimums, Koch family foundations, the Coalition for Public Safety, and the MacArthur Foundation, announced a bipartisan resolution to reform the criminal justice system and reduce mandatory sentencing laws. Their efforts were lauded by President Obama who noted these reforms will improve rehabilitation and workforce opportunities for those who have served their sentences. In their arguments, they noted that mandatory sentencing is often too harsh of a punishment and cripples someone's livelihood for minor crimes. In 2019, then presidential candidate Joe Biden unveiled his criminal justice reform plan which would eliminate mandatory minimum sentences.

== See also ==
- Fact bargaining
- Fair Sentencing Act – American federal law
- Zero tolerance – Punishment policy with no discretion for leniency
