= Shock probation =

American legal policy

Shock probation is the US legal policy by which a judge orders a convicted offender to prison for a short time, and then suspends the remainder of the sentence in favor of probation. It is hoped that the initial experience of prison will provide an effective deterrent to recidivism.

In shock probation, a convicted offender is sentenced to prison and starts serving their sentence. After three to six months, the judge re-sentences the prisoner to probation, and the prisoner is released under supervision. Shock probation is usually considered when a prisoner is a first-time offender and a judge believes, given the circumstances of the case, that the prisoner has a chance at reform which may be enhanced by being released.

Shock probation is not used in all U.S. states. In states where it is used, shock probation is at the discretion of the judge.

== See also ==
- Split sentence
- Criminal law of the United States
- United States Federal Sentencing Guidelines
