= Santos Reyes =

Santos Reyes may refer to:

== People ==
- Santos Reyes (prisoner), an American prisoner
- Arturo Santos Reyes (born 1985), a Mexican boxer

== Places ==
- Santos Reyes Nopala, Oaxaca, Mexico
- Santos Reyes Pápalo, Oaxaca, Mexico
- Santos Reyes Tepejillo, Oaxaca, Mexico
- Santos Reyes Yucuná, Oaxaca, Mexico

== Other uses ==
- Los Santos Reyes, 1958 Mexican film

== See also ==
- Reyes, Bolivia
