= Mugambi Jouet =

French lawyer and author

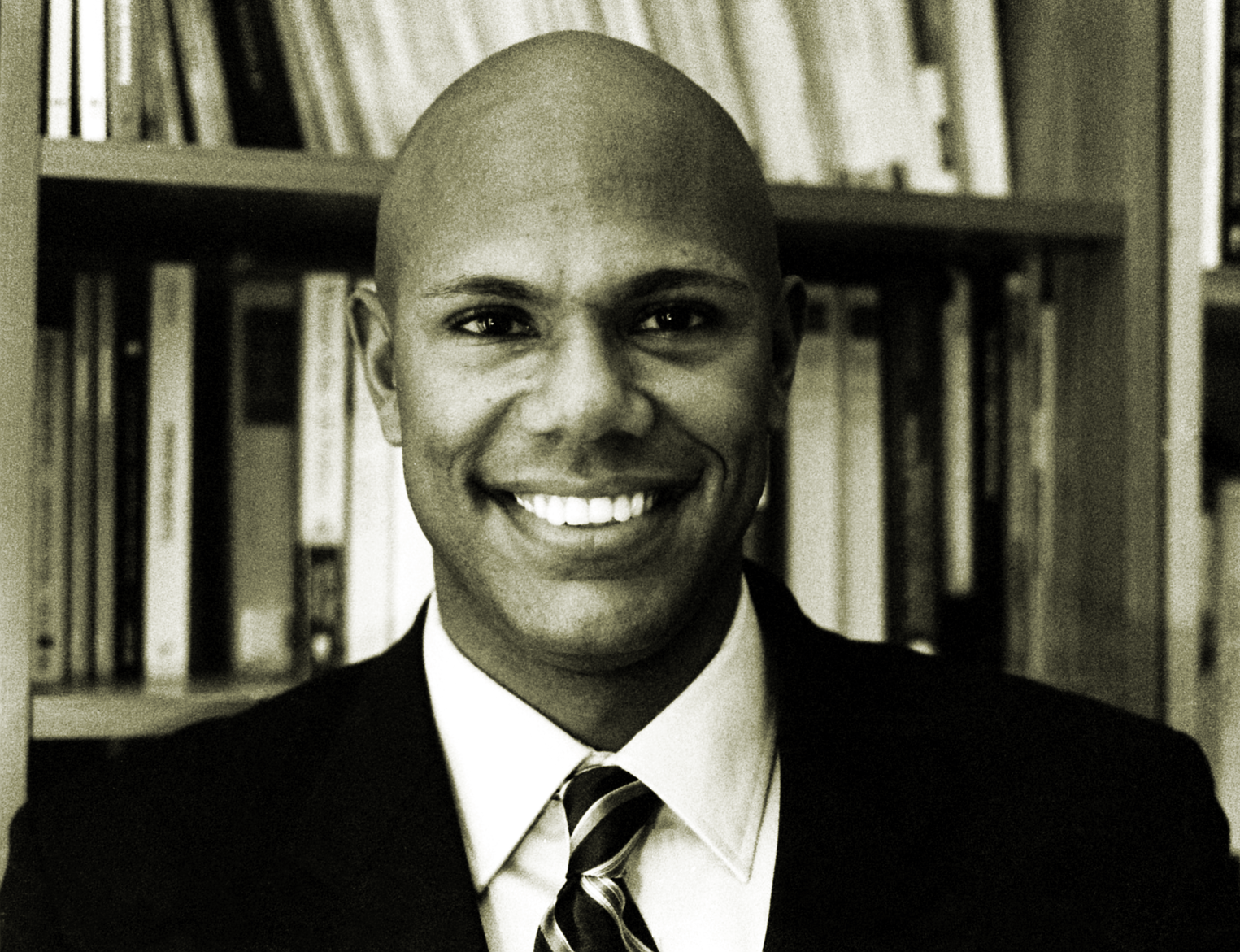

Mugambi Jouet (born c. 1981) is a professor at the USC Gould School of Law. An author and human rights lawyer, he writes in both English and French about legal, political, and social issues with a focus on American exceptionalism and criminal justice. He has been interviewed on radio and television about how American society compares to France, Canada, and other countries.

== Early life, education and career ==
Jouet grew up in Paris and moved to the United States for university. He was a history major at Rice University before studying public policy at NYU and law at Northwestern. He subsequently worked as a public defender in Manhattan. After living 11 years in America, he returned to Europe to practice international criminal law at a tribunal in The Hague, Netherlands.

He joined the McGill University Faculty of Law in 2019 as assistant professor, after teaching at Stanford Law School. In 2022, he became associate professor at the University of Southern California's Gould School of Law.

== Writing ==
Jouet is the author of Exceptional America: What Divides Americans From the World and From Each Other, a book analyzing the polarization of modern America compared to other Western nations through the angle of American exceptionalism. Besides exploring the meaning of “exceptionalism,” Jouet discusses how unique aspects of American history, government, and culture have led to social conflict and peculiar phenomena like mass incarceration.

In addition to being interviewed by the American, French, and Canadian media, his articles have been featured in the press, including Slate, Mother Jones, the San Francisco Chronicle, The New Republic, Salon, The Huffington Post, Truthout, The Hill, Le Nouvel Observateur, Libération, and Le Monde. His academic articles have especially addressed criminal justice, capital punishment, human rights, and constitutionalism.

In an op-ed article for Le Monde, Jouet described his experiences as a public defender in New York and noted that criminal sentencing in America is far harsher than in other democratic countries due to mass incarceration. Jouet attributed this difference to various factors, including the tendency to focus on retribution rather than on prisoner rehabilitation, humanitarian issues, and root social causes of crime. He also called in question demands for harsher punishments in France, stating that such reforms would not necessarily reduce crime, as illustrated by America's case.
