= Split sentence =

In United States law, a split sentence is a sentence under which the defendant serves up to half of his term of imprisonment outside of prison. Martha Stewart received a split sentence.

The Bureau of Prisons' general counsel has opined that when an offender has received a sentence of imprisonment, the Bureau of Prisons does not have general authority, either upon the recommendation of the sentencing judge or otherwise, to place such an offender in community confinement at the outset of his sentence or to transfer him from prison to community confinement at any time BOP chooses during the course of his sentence. A split sentence is only available to defendants who fall into Zone C of the Federal Sentencing Table.

A "reverse split sentence" is one whereby the defendant is sentenced to a term of probation which may be followed by a period of incarceration or, with respect to a felony, into community control. Reverse split sentences are authorized by some states.

A 2021 study, which compared individuals given a split sentence to comparable individuals given to a probation sentence, found that split sentencing increased the risk of future prison admissions and reduced the formal labor market employment among whites who were employed prior to their sentencing.

== See also ==
- Shock probation
