= Blakely v. Washington =

- Supreme Court of the United States

Argued March 23, 2004 Decided June 24, 2004
- Full case name: Ralph Howard Blakely, Jr. v. Washington
- Citations: 542 U.S. 296 (more) 124 S. Ct. 2531; 159 L. Ed. 2d 403; 2004 U.S. LEXIS 4573; 72 U.S.L.W. 4546; 17 Fla. L. Weekly Fed. S 430

Case history
- Prior: Defendant sentenced, Grant County Superior Court, 11-13-00; affirmed, 47 P.3d 149 (Wash. App. 2002); review denied, 62 P.3d 889 (Wash. 2003); cert. granted, 540 U.S. 965 (2003).
- Subsequent: Rehearing denied, 125 S. Ct. 21 (2004)

Holding
- The State of Washington's criminal sentencing system violated the Sixth Amendment right to a jury trial, because it gave judges the ability to increase sentences based on their own determination of facts.

Court membership
- Chief Justice William Rehnquist Associate Justices John P. Stevens · Sandra Day O'Connor; Antonin Scalia · Anthony Kennedy; David Souter · Clarence Thomas; Ruth Bader Ginsburg · Stephen Breyer

Case opinions
- Majority: Scalia, joined by Stevens, Souter, Thomas, Ginsburg
- Dissent: O'Connor, joined by Breyer; Rehnquist, Kennedy (except as to Part IV-B)
- Dissent: Kennedy, joined by Breyer
- Dissent: Breyer, joined by O'Connor

Laws applied
- U.S. Const. amend. VI; Washington Sentencing Reform Act

Blakely v. Washington, 542 U.S. 296 (2004), is a landmark decision by the Supreme Court of the United States in which the Court held, 5–4, that in the context of mandatory sentencing guidelines under state law, the Sixth Amendment right to a jury trial prohibited judges from enhancing criminal sentences based on facts other than those decided by the jury or admitted by the defendant. The landmark nature of the case was alluded to by Justice Sandra Day O'Connor, who characterized the decision as a "Number 10 earthquake".

== Background of the case ==
Ralph Howard Blakely II, was born in 1936; he started his criminal career in 1954. Blakely married his wife in 1973. During the Blakely's 20-plus-year marriage, Blakely was involved in 80 or more lawsuits covering irrigation water rights, as well as crimes of assault, shoplifting, and many others. When his wife filed for divorce in 1996, Blakely kidnapped her from her home in rural Grant County, Washington, at knifepoint, forced her into a wooden box in the back of his pickup truck, and took her to Montana. He ordered their 13-year-old son to follow in another car, threatening to shoot his estranged wife with a shotgun if he did not comply. En route to Montana, their son escaped in Moses Lake, Washington, and alerted the police. FBI agents and sheriffs arrested Blakely in Montana near the town of Three Forks.

Blakely was charged with first-degree kidnapping, but ultimately pleaded guilty to second-degree kidnapping involving domestic violence and the use of a firearm. If one is convicted of first-degree kidnapping of a minor in Washington state, one must register as a sex offender upon release from prison. To avoid this, Blakely negotiated a plea of a longer sentence while pleading guilty only to second-degree kidnapping. At the plea hearing, Blakely admitted the facts necessary to support these charges but no others. Under Washington law, second-degree kidnapping was a class B felony, punishable by a maximum sentence of 10 years in prison. However, under Washington's mandatory sentencing guidelines, the judge was required to sentence Blakely to no less than 49 and no more than 53 months in prison, unless he had "substantial and compelling" reasons to impose a sentence outside that range. These reasons could not take into account factors used to compute the standard range for the sentence. If the judge did not articulate specific findings of fact and conclusions of law justifying an exceptional sentence, an appellate court would have to reverse the sentence.

Despite these requirements, the trial judge sentenced Blakely to 90 months, finding that Blakely had acted with "deliberate cruelty." Blakely appealed, arguing that this unexpected additional factfinding on the judge's part violated his Sixth Amendment right under Apprendi v. New Jersey, 530 U.S. 466 (2000), to have the jury determine beyond a reasonable doubt all the facts legally necessary to his sentence. The Washington Court of Appeals rejected his claim, and the Washington Supreme Court declined to review it. Blakely then asked the U.S. Supreme Court to review the case, and it agreed to do so.

In an unusual turn of events, the local county prosecutor, John Knodell III, asked Washington's governor for permission to personally argue the case before the U.S. Supreme Court. During oral argument, Justice Scalia challenged Knodell for attempting to impose a prison sentence much longer than what state law authorized.

== Majority opinion ==
In order to resolve this case, the Court had to apply the rule set forth in Apprendi v. New Jersey: "Other than the fact of a prior conviction, any fact that increases the penalty for a crime beyond the prescribed statutory maximum must be submitted to a jury, and proved beyond a reasonable doubt." This rule promoted the historic concerns of the jury-trial requirement — to subject all accusations against a criminal defendant to the "unanimous suffrage of twelve of his equals and neighbors," and to confirm the existence of those facts essential to the punishment under the law. In this case, the finding of "deliberate cruelty" had not been submitted to a jury, and Blakely had not admitted acting with "deliberate cruelty." The State contended that this was not problematic under Apprendi because the statutory maximum was 10 years, not 53 months. The Court read Apprendi as having held that the "statutory maximum" punishment was "the maximum sentence [the judge] may impose without any additional findings." Accordingly, because "deliberate cruelty" was not an element of the crimes to which Blakely had pleaded guilty, the judge could not have used that fact to enhance Blakely's sentence above the 53-month statutory maximum.

The Court's "commitment to Apprendi in this context reflects not just respect for longstanding precedent, but the need to give intelligible content to the right of jury trial. That right is no procedural formality, but a fundamental reservation of power in our constitutional structure." Just as citizens participate in the legislative process by electing representatives to the legislature, they participate in the judicial process by serving on juries. The Apprendi rule ensures that "the judge's authority to sentence derives wholly from the jury's verdict. Without that restriction, the jury would not exercise the control that the Framers intended." Justice Scalia, as the author of the majority opinion, reasoned that those who reject Apprendi "are resigned to one of two alternatives." First, a jury might be allowed only to pass on a small part of criminal activity, and then allow the judge to determine the punishment for the full range of conduct the government seeks to punish, as by letting the jury determine whether an accused murderer illegally possessed a firearm and then allowing the judge to impose a life sentence because the defendant had used the firearm to kill someone. Second, the legislature could establish judicial limits that were not too excessive, a necessarily subjective standard that would be hard for the Court to monitor and adjust as necessary. But this claim was not plausible, since the entire purpose of the jury-trial requirement was to check judicial authority.

Scalia insisted that the result of the case would not signal the end of determinate sentencing altogether. Rather, it merely required states to implement determinate sentencing in a manner consistent with the Sixth Amendment.

== Dissenting opinions ==
=== Justice O'Connor's dissent ===
Justice O'Connor feared dire consequences as a result of the Court's ruling. Before Washington enacted its guidelines scheme, there was remarkable disparity among sentences meted out for similar offenses. Guidelines schemes have the effect of reducing this disparity by channeling the discretion of sentencing judges, who are told how to weigh what factors when computing a sentence. By enacting its sentencing guidelines, Washington did not intend to "manipulate the statutory elements of criminal offenses or circumvent the procedural protections of the Bill of Rights. Rather, lawmakers were trying to bring some much-needed uniformity, transparency, and accountability to an otherwise 'labyrinthine sentencing and corrections system that 'lacked any principle except unbridled discretion.'"

Far from "disregarding principles of due process and the jury trial right," O'Connor argued, the guidelines system honored them. Under the former sentencing scheme, a defendant like Blakely could have received anything from probation to 10 years in prison. Under the guidelines, he knows what range of sentence he might receive based on the conduct in which he engaged. "Criminal defendants still face the same statutory maximum sentences, but they now at least know, much more than before, the real consequences of their actions." The guidelines also reduce disparities, particularly those based on race, which was a concern of some critics of the pre-guidelines system.

O'Connor foresaw a "substantial constitutional tax" in applying the Apprendi rule to sentencing guidelines systems. She protested that the traditional sentencing factors would now have to be charged in the indictment and proved to a jury. Bifurcated proceedings may become commonplace in criminal trials, so that a jury might not improperly consider prior bad acts during the guilt phase but properly consider them when it comes time for sentencing. And under some guidelines schemes, such as the federal sentencing guidelines, some facts relevant to sentencing, such as perjury and obstruction of justice, cannot be known until the trial is underway. In any event, all relevant sentencing facts may not be known prior to trial, since prosecutors typically wait until after a guilty verdict is obtained before gathering a full history of the defendant and examining the pertinent facts of the crime in order to recommend a sentence.

Finally, O'Connor disagreed with the majority's interpretation of the "statutory maximum" in a guidelines context. She believed that, despite the mandatory nature of the guidelines, the "statutory maximum" remained (for Blakely) 10 years. For O'Connor, mere formalism dictated the conclusion that the "statutory maximum" was the greatest sentence the judge could legally impose based on the facts found by the jury or admitted by the defendant, and formalism was not a virtue she felt was worth vindicating. Furthermore, the effects of the decision were not confined to Washington, for every system involving guidelines sentencing, including the federal system, were constitutionally suspect.

=== Justice Breyer's dissent ===
Justice Breyer envisioned three possible responses to the majority's decision. First, legislatures could prescribe exactly the same sentence for all possible variations of a crime — an automatic five-year sentence for all robberies, for instance. This system has the "intolerable" effect of imposing the same sentence on people who commit their crimes in vastly different ways. Prosecutors would end up with the real control over defendants' sentences, since prosecutors ultimately make the decisions regarding how to charge the case. Second, states could return to indeterminate sentencing, in which the authorized range of punishment for crimes is very broad. But such systems were criticized (rightly, in Breyer's view) for their excessive disparity and unfairness. There would be less "reason" in an indeterminate sentencing system than in the guidelines system Washington had adopted.

Third, the guidelines systems currently in force would remain, and the jury-trial requirement would be grafted onto them. Breyer predicted this could play out in one of two ways. First, legislatures might redefine crimes with highly specific detail — a robbery statute could enhance punishment based on the value of the goods taken, whether a gun was used, the seriousness of the threat used to obtain the goods, and so on. But the result of this system would be the same as the first option — prosecutors would end up with the discretion to determine the defendant's sentence by manipulating the charge. Second, two juries could be assembled for each criminal trial, one for the guilt phase and one for the penalty phase. But this approach would be costly, as the experience with bifurcated trials in capital cases has shown.

Perhaps another solution would be to prescribe overly harsh sentences for crimes, and then define a list of mitigating factors, so that a judge could still retain the discretion to impose sentences (since the jury-trial requirement only applies to increases in the maximum sentence). But "political impediments" make vast revisions of any legislative scheme difficult to implement, and Breyer doubted that the mere fact that the Court ruled the Sixth Amendment demanded a legislative solution would impel many state legislatures to revamp their criminal codes in this way.

Finally, Breyer argued that legislatures needed to retain the constitutional authority to make the labelling decision between an "element" of a crime and a "sentencing factor." Without the ability to do so, legislatures cannot create "sentencing systems that are consistent with, and indeed may help to advance, the Constitution's greater fairness goals." For Breyer, those greater fairness goals are achieved when a defendant's real conduct drives the sentence he receives. Constitutional obstacles that stand in the way of this goal detract from the overall fairness of the criminal justice system.

== Effect on subsequent jurisprudence ==
Although the Court expressly stated that it was not addressing the constitutionality of the Federal Sentencing Guidelines, it was hard to resist the conclusion that the Guidelines as then constituted were in jeopardy in light of the tremendous similarity between the structure of the federal Guidelines and the Washington Guidelines at issue in Blakely. Six weeks after the decision in this case, the Court agreed to review two cases involving the constitutionality of sentence enhancements under the federal Guidelines — United States v. Booker and a companion case, United States v. Fanfan — an extraordinary step for the Court to take during the summer months. The Court ordered the briefs in Booker to be submitted during the month of September 2004, and scheduled oral argument in Booker for the first day of the 2004 Term, Monday, October 4. The Court's opinion in Booker came out on January 12, 2005, and drastically changed the legal framework within which federal sentencing takes place.

Also, many states had to decide how Blakely applied to their sentencing systems. California, notably, concluded it did not affect its sentencing scheme in a case decided by the California Supreme Court called People v. Black. The U.S. Supreme Court later concluded that Blakely did apply in California, thereby overruling Black with its decision in Cunningham v. California.

== Subsequent developments ==
One week before release of the opinion which invalidated Blakely's sentence, John Knodell III, the Grant County prosecutor who lost the prior case before the U.S. Supreme Court, obtained authorization for a new warrant alleging Blakely solicited a planted prison informant for the murder of Blakely's wife and daughter. Blakely is now serving 35 years in prison due to this separate case. Knodell personally prosecuted this second case against Blakely. Blakely made a claim of prosecutorial vindictiveness, asserting Knodell vindictively filed the criminal solicitation charge in retaliation for Blakely's successful appeal of his sentence in Blakely, 542 U.S. 296, 124 S. Ct. 2531, 159 L. Ed. 2d 403, but the court of appeals rejected Blakely's claim.

In response, the Washington State Legislature passed RCW 9.94A.535(3), which includes an exhaustive list of the aggravating factual scenarios which require a jury decision before aggravating factors may be applied to sentences. RCW 9.94A.535(2) lists judicial factors for which no jury trial is required.

== See also ==
- List of United States Supreme Court cases, volume 542
- List of United States Supreme Court cases
