= Safety valve (law) =

The safety valve is a provision in the Sentencing Reform Act and the United States Federal Sentencing Guidelines that authorizes a sentence below the statutory minimum for certain nonviolent, non-managerial drug offenders with little or no criminal history. A Senate version of the First Step Act was signed into law in December 2018, which expanded the safety valve to include offenders with up to four criminal history points, excluding 1-point offenses, such as minor misdemeanors.
