= Fact bargaining =

Fact bargaining is a type of plea bargaining that occurs when prosecutors and defendants bargain over what version of events should be stipulated to by the parties and presented to the court as what happened. Some statutes or sentencing guidelines specify that certain increases or decreases in the sentencing range must occur if certain facts are proven. For example, a drug offense may carry a mandatory minimum sentence if the offender had a prior drug felony, possessed a certain amount of drugs or played a supervisory role in a drug conspiracy. The prosecutor may agree to stipulate that there was no such prior drug felony, that the offense less than the threshold amount of drugs, or that the offender played no such supervisory role in exchange for a guilty plea. Fact bargaining can also involve the defendant stipulating to certain facts in exchange for certain concessions so the prosecutor does not need to prove those facts.

Nancy King has argued that fact bargaining defeats the intention of the sentencing guidelines to have judges find facts. According to William G. Young, fact bargaining "involves a fraud on the court as the government's recital of material facts during the plea colloquy and at sentencing necessarily must omit or at minimum gloss over facts material to sentencing. . . . . If fact bargaining is acceptable, then the entire moral and intellectual basis for the Sentencing Guidelines is rendered essentially meaningless." Judges rarely overturn stipulations reached by fact bargaining.

In some cases, "creative" plea bargains are reached in which the defendant pleads guilty to a totally different lesser crime. An example would be a robbery suspect pleading guilty to copyright violation.
