= Plea colloquy =

A plea colloquy, in United States criminal procedure, is a conversation between a judge and a criminal defendant who has been sworn under oath, which must occur when the defendant enters a guilty plea in court in order for the plea to be valid. The United States Supreme Court has crafted a doctrine which requires the court to engage in a specific line of inquiry. Because a guilty plea must be made intelligently, knowingly, and voluntarily, the court must advise the defendant of the following things:

1. The nature of the charge
2. The potential penalties which might result from the plea, including any mandatory minimum sentence
3. The defendant's rights to not plead guilty, and to request a jury trial.

The court must ask the defendant if he understands each of these points, and must receive a voluntary affirmative response. Many courts use a script of the questions which the judge will ask the defendant and the defense attorney in a specific order. Failure by the court to advise the defendant of any of the above points will supply the grounds for a collateral attack on the plea; if such an attack is successful, the guilty plea will be withdrawn, and the defendant will be given the opportunity to enter a new plea. The court can accept and bind the defendant to a guilty plea, even if the defendant insists that he is innocent, and merely taking the plea to avoid conviction by a jury.

Pursuant to the Sixth Amendment to the U.S. Constitution, a criminal defendant has the right to be represented by an attorney during a plea colloquy; failure of the state to provide an attorney to an indigent defendant during such proceedings is grounds for an appeal. It is possible - but very difficult - for a defendant who is so represented to have a plea thrown out due to ineffective assistance of counsel. The defendant must make a positive showing that but for the erroneous advice of counsel, he would not have chosen to plead guilty.
