= United States Federal Sentencing Guidelines =

Rules for sentencing convicts in the U.S. federal courts system

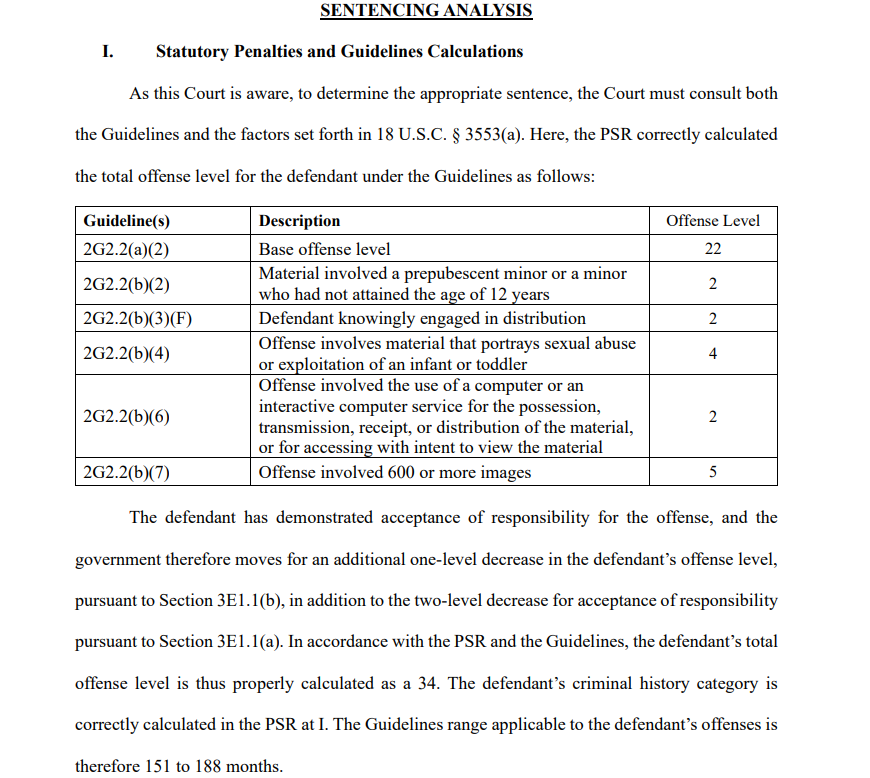
Example of a matrix and explanation showing how the total months recommended is calculated from the Base Level Offense taking into account all factors

The United States Federal Sentencing Guidelines are rules published by the U.S. Sentencing Commission that set out a uniform policy for sentencing individuals and organizations convicted of felonies and serious (Class A) misdemeanors in the United States federal court system. The Guidelines do not apply to less serious misdemeanors or infractions.

Although the Guidelines were initially styled as mandatory, the U.S. Supreme Court's 2005 decision in United States v. Booker held that the Guidelines, as originally constituted, violated the Sixth Amendment right to trial by jury, and the remedy chosen was to excise those provisions of the law establishing the Guidelines as mandatory. After Booker and other Supreme Court cases, such as Blakely v. Washington (2004), the Guidelines are now considered advisory only. Federal judges (state judges are not affected by the Guidelines) must calculate the guidelines and consider them when determining a sentence, but are not required to issue sentences within the guidelines.

== History ==
=== Enabling legislation ===
The Guidelines are the product of the United States Sentencing Commission, which was created by the Sentencing Reform Act of 1984. The Guidelines' primary goal was to alleviate sentencing disparities that research had indicated were prevalent in the existing sentencing system, and the guidelines reform was specifically intended to provide for determinate sentencing. This refers to sentencing whose actual limits are determined at the time the sentence is imposed, as opposed to indeterminate sentencing, in which a sentence with a maximum (and, perhaps, a minimum) is pronounced but the actual amount of time served in prison is determined by a parole commission or similar administrative body after the person has started serving his or her sentence. As part of the guidelines reform in 1984, parole on federal level was abolished.

The federal effort followed guidelines projects in several states, initially funded by the United States Department of Justice, and led by Jack Kress and his research team during the late 1970s. The first sentencing guidelines jurisdictions were county-wide, in Denver, Newark, Chicago and Philadelphia. Statewide guidelines systems were next established in Utah, Minnesota, Pennsylvania, Maryland, Michigan, Washington, and Delaware, before the federal sentencing guidelines were formally adopted in 1987. Given that the vast majority of criminal sentencing is done at the state level, the American Law Institute and the American Bar Association have each recommended such systems for all the states, and nearly half the states presently have such systems, although significant variations exist among them. For example, Minnesota's Sentencing Guidelines Commission initially sought consciously not to increase prison capacity through guidelines. That is, Minnesota assumed that the legislature should determine how much would be spent on prisons and that the sentencing commission's job was to allocate those prison beds in as rational a way as possible. The federal effort took the opposite approach. It determined how many prisons would be needed and Congress was then essentially required to fund those beds.

=== Promulgation and modification ===
In drafting the first set of guidelines, the Commission used data drawn from 10,000 presentence investigations, the differing elements of various crimes as distinguished in substantive criminal statutes, the United States Parole Commission's guidelines and statistics, and data from other sources in order to determine which distinctions were important in pre-guidelines practice. Sentencing criteria already in use by judges was thus codified as guidelines. The Commission essentially codified existing practice. Future modifications often reflected Congressional mandates, as in the case of the Anti-Drug Abuse Act of 1986 that imposed increased and mandatory minimum sentences.

In 2003, Congress considered the Feeney Amendment to the PROTECT Act. This amendment would have totally rewritten the guidelines. Among other changes, the original amendment would have eliminated all unenumerated downward departures and all downward departures for family ties, diminished capacity, aberrant behavior, educational or vocational skills, mental or emotional conditions, employment record, good works, or overstated criminal history. Defense lawyers, law professors, current and former Sentencing Commissioners, the President of the American Bar Association, Chief Justice William Rehnquist, and others wrote to Congress opposing the amendment. The enacted bill limited the changes described above to crimes involving pornography, sexual abuse, child sex, and child kidnapping and trafficking. It also raised penalties for child pornography and child sex abuse. It also greatly increased prosecutorial discretion and influence by limiting judges' power to depart from the guidelines and granting prosecutors greater power over departures. For instance, it made a prosecutorial motion a prerequisite for a three-level reduction for acceptance of responsibility. It also instructed the Sentencing Commission to authorize four-level "fast-track" downward departures in illegal-reentry immigration cases upon motion of the prosecutor.

=== United States v. Booker ===
Though the Federal Sentencing Guidelines were styled as mandatory, the Supreme Court's 2005 decision in United States v. Booker found that the Guidelines, as originally constituted, violated the Sixth Amendment right to trial by jury, and the chosen remedy was excision of those provisions of the law establishing the Guidelines as mandatory. In the aftermath of Booker and other Supreme Court cases, such as Blakely v. Washington (2004), Guidelines are now considered advisory only. Federal judges (state judges are not affected by the Guidelines) must calculate the guidelines and consider them when determining a sentence but are not required to issue sentences within the guidelines. Those sentences are still, however, subject to appellate review. The frequency in which sentences are imposed that exceed the range stated in the Guidelines has doubled in the years since the Booker decision.

== Guidelines basics ==
The Guidelines determine sentences based primarily on two factors:

1. the conduct associated with the offense (the offense conduct, which produces the offense level)
2. the defendant's criminal history (the criminal history category)

The Sentencing Table in the Guidelines Manual shows the relationship between these two factors; for each pairing of offense level and criminal history category, the Table specifies a sentencing range, in months, within which the court may sentence a defendant. For example, for a defendant convicted on an offense with a total offense level of 22 and a criminal history category of I, the Guidelines recommend a sentence of 41–51 months. If, however, a person with an extensive criminal history (Category VI) committed the same offense in the same manner in the same modern timeline and not during the older guideline periods, the Guidelines would recommend a sentence of 84–105 months.

=== Offense level ===
There are 43 offense levels. The offense level of a defendant is determined by looking up the offense in Chapter 2 and applying any applicable adjustments. The originally proposed sentencing guidelines had 360 levels, and there are proposals to substantially reduce the current number of offense levels.

=== Criminal history ===
There are six criminal history categories. Each category is associated with a range of criminal history points. Thus, for example, a defendant with 0 or 1 criminal history points would be in Criminal History Category I, while a defendant with 13 or more criminal history points would be in Criminal History Category VI. The criminal history points are calculated by adding 3 points for each prior sentence of imprisonment exceeding one year and one month; adding 2 points for each prior sentence of imprisonment of at least sixty days but not more than 13 months; adding 1 point for each prior sentence of less than sixty days; adding 2 points if the defendant committed the instant offense while under any criminal justice sentence, including probation, parole, supervised release, imprisonment, work release, or escape status; adding 2 points if the defendant committed the instant offense less than two years after release from imprisonment on a sentence of sixty days or more or while in imprisonment or escape status on such a sentence, except that if 2 points are added committing the offense while under a criminal justice sentence, adding only 1 point for this item; and adding 1 point for each prior sentence resulting from a conviction of a crime of violence that did not receive any points because such sentence was counted as a single sentence, up to a total of 3 points for this item.

The guidelines require "counting prior adult diversionary dispositions if they involved a judicial determination of guilt or an admission of guilt in open court." This reflects a policy that defendants who previously received the benefit of a rehabilitative sentence and then commit further crimes should not be treated with further leniency.

=== Zones ===
There are four sentencing zones: A, B, C, and D. Zone A consists of sentencing ranges of 0–6 months. Zone B consists of sentencing ranges above Zone A but with a maximum penalty of no more than 15 months. Zone C consists of sentencing ranges above Zone B but whose maximum penalty is 18 months or less. Zone D consists of sentencing ranges above Zone C.

A defendant in Zone A is eligible for Federal Probation, and no term of imprisonment is required. Probation is also authorized if the applicable guideline range is in Zone B of the Sentencing Table and the court imposes a condition or combination of conditions requiring intermittent confinement, community confinement, or home detention as provided in U.S.S.G. § 5C1.1(c)(3) (2012), but at least one month of the sentence must be satisfied by imprisonment. A split sentence is authorized for defendants in Zone C. That is, Zone C defendants must serve at least half of their sentence in prison.

In 2010, the U.S. Sentencing Commission proposed expanding Zones B and C, in recognition of the fact that many offenders are sentenced to 12 months and 1 day in order to receive the benefit of good time under U.S. federal law.

== Adjustments ==
=== Reductions in time to be served ===
A 2- or 3-level offense level decrease is typically granted for acceptance of responsibility if the defendant accepts a plea bargain. However, the decrease will not apply if the defendant demonstrates behavior, such as continued criminal activity, that is inconsistent with acceptance of responsibility.

=== Increase in time to be served ===
There are victim-related adjustments for hate crime motivation or vulnerable victims; official victims; restraint of victims; and terrorism. Adjustments can apply depending on the offender's role in the offense, which can include an aggravating role, a mitigating role. Enhancements apply for abuse of a position of trust or use of a special skill, using a minor to commit a crime, and use of body armor or a firearm in drug trafficking crimes and crimes of violence.

In addition, there are enhancements related to obstruction of justice, including obstructing or impeding the administration of justice, reckless endangerment during flight, commission of an offense while on release, and false registration of a domain name.

Adjustments also apply in cases involving multiple counts.

== Departures ==
Departures upward or downward from the guideline range are appropriate for cases that deviate from the heartland of cases.

Departures are allowed in cases involving substantial assistance to authorities in the investigation or prosecution of another person who has committed an offense. The Sentencing Reform Act allows a departure below the applicable statutory mandatory minimum in such cases. There is no penalty for refusal to assist authorities.

The Federal Rules of Criminal Procedure and U.S. Sentencing Guidelines require that the prosecution file a motion allowing the reduction. The court is not required to grant the reduction, and may decline to do so if it deems the information provided by the defendant to be untruthful, incomplete, unreliable, insignificant, not useful, or untimely. The Guidelines provide, "Substantial weight should be given to the government's evaluation of the extent of the defendant's assistance, particularly where the extent and value of the assistance are difficult to ascertain."

Some defendants attempt to provide substantial assistance, but their assistance is ultimately deemed not to be substantial, which prevents them from getting the departure even if they made incriminating statements.

Other grounds for departure:

- Death (§5K2.1)

If death resulted, the court may increase the sentence above the authorized guideline range. Loss of life does not automatically suggest a sentence at or near the statutory maximum. The sentencing judge must give consideration to matters that would normally distinguish among levels of homicide, such as the defendant's state of mind and the degree of planning or preparation. Other appropriate factors are whether multiple deaths resulted, and the means by which life was taken. The extent of the increase should depend on the dangerousness of the defendant's conduct, the extent to which death or serious injury was intended or knowingly risked, and the extent to which the offense level for the offense of conviction, as determined by the other Chapter Two guidelines, already reflects the risk of personal injury. For example, a substantial increase may be appropriate if the death was intended or knowingly risked or if the underlying offense was one for which base offense levels do not reflect an allowance for the risk of personal injury, such as fraud.

- Physical injury (§5K2.2)

If significant physical injury resulted, the court may increase the sentence above the authorized guideline range. The extent of the increase ordinarily should depend on the extent of the injury, the degree to which it may prove permanent, and the extent to which the injury was intended or knowingly risked. When the victim suffers a major, permanent disability and when such injury was intentionally inflicted, a substantial departure may be appropriate. If the injury is less serious or if the defendant (though criminally negligent) did not knowingly create the risk of harm, a less substantial departure would be indicated. In general, the same considerations apply as in §5K2.1.

- Extreme psychological injury (§5K2.3)

If a victim or victims suffered psychological injury much more serious than that normally resulting from commission of the offense, the court may increase the sentence above the authorized guideline range. The extent of the increase ordinarily should depend on the severity of the psychological injury and the extent to which the injury was intended or knowingly risked. Normally, psychological injury would be sufficiently severe to warrant application of this adjustment only when there is a substantial impairment of the intellectual, psychological, emotional, or behavioral functioning of a victim, when the impairment is likely to be of an extended or continuous duration, and when the impairment manifests itself by physical or psychological symptoms or by changes in behavior patterns. The court should consider the extent to which such harm was likely, given the nature of the defendant's conduct.

- Abduction or unlawful restraint (§5K2.4)

If a person was abducted, taken hostage, or unlawfully restrained to facilitate commission of the offense or to facilitate the escape from the scene of the crime, the court may increase the sentence above the authorized guideline range.

- Property damage or loss (§5K2.5)

If the offense caused property damage or loss not taken into account within the guidelines, the court may increase the sentence above the authorized guideline range. The extent of the increase ordinarily should depend on the extent to which the harm was intended or knowingly risked and on the extent to which the harm to property is more serious than other harm caused or risked by the conduct relevant to the offense of conviction.

- Weapons and dangerous instrumentalities (§5K2.6)

If a weapon or dangerous instrumentality was used or possessed in the commission of the offense the court may increase the sentence above the authorized guideline range. The extent of the increase ordinarily should depend on the dangerousness of the weapon, the manner in which it was used, and the extent to which its use endangered others. The discharge of a firearm might warrant a substantial sentence increase.

- Disruption of governmental function (§5K2.7)

If the defendant's conduct resulted in a significant disruption of a governmental function, the court may increase the sentence above the authorized guideline range to reflect the nature and extent of the disruption and the importance of the governmental function affected. Departure from the guidelines ordinarily would not be justified when the offense of conviction is an offense such as bribery or obstruction of justice; in such cases interference with a governmental function is inherent in the offense, and unless the circumstances are unusual the guidelines will reflect the appropriate punishment for such interference.

- Extreme conduct (§5K2.8)

If the defendant's conduct was unusually heinous, cruel, brutal, or degrading to the victim, the court may increase the sentence above the guideline range to reflect the nature of the conduct. Examples of extreme conduct include torture of a victim, gratuitous infliction of injury, or prolonging of pain or humiliation.

- Criminal purpose (§5K2.9)

If the defendant committed the offense in order to facilitate or conceal the commission of another offense, the court may increase the sentence above the guideline range to reflect the actual seriousness of the defendant's conduct.

- Victim's conduct (§5K2.10)

If the victim's wrongful conduct contributed significantly to provoking the offense behavior, the court may reduce the sentence below the guideline range to reflect the nature and circumstances of the offense. In deciding whether a sentence reduction is warranted, and the extent of such reduction, the court should consider the following:

1. The size and strength of the victim, or other relevant physical characteristics, in comparison with those of the defendant.
2. The persistence of the victim's conduct and any efforts by the defendant to prevent confrontation.
3. The danger reasonably perceived by the defendant, including the victim's reputation for violence.
4. The danger actually presented to the defendant by the victim.
5. Any other relevant conduct by the victim that substantially contributed to the danger presented.
6. The proportionality and reasonableness of the defendant's response to the victim's provocation.

Victim misconduct ordinarily would not be sufficient to warrant application of this provision in the context of offenses under Chapter Two, Part A, Subpart 3 (Criminal Sexual Abuse). In addition, this provision usually would not be relevant in the context of non-violent offenses. There may, however, be unusual circumstances in which substantial victim misconduct would warrant a reduced penalty in the case of a non-violent offense. For example, an extended course of provocation and harassment might lead a defendant to steal or destroy property in retaliation.

- Lesser harms (§5K2.11)

Sometimes, a defendant may commit a crime in order to avoid a perceived greater harm. In such instances, a reduced sentence may be appropriate, provided that the circumstances significantly diminish society's interest in punishing the conduct, for example, in the case of a mercy killing. Where the interest in punishment or deterrence is not reduced, a reduction in sentence is not warranted. For example, providing defense secrets to a hostile power should receive no lesser punishment simply because the defendant believed that the government's policies were misdirected. In other instances, conduct may not cause or threaten the harm or evil sought to be prevented by the law proscribing the offense at issue. For example, where a war veteran possessed a machine gun or grenade as a trophy, or a school teacher possessed controlled substances for display in a drug education program, a reduced sentence might be warranted.

- Coercion and duress (§5K2.12)

If the defendant committed the offense because of serious coercion, blackmail or duress, under circumstances not amounting to a complete defense, the court may depart downward. The extent of the decrease ordinarily should depend on the reasonableness of the defendant's actions, on the proportionality of the defendant's actions to the seriousness of coercion, blackmail, or duress involved, and on the extent to which the conduct would have been less harmful under the circumstances as the defendant believed them to be. Ordinarily coercion will be sufficiently serious to warrant departure only when it involves a threat of physical injury, substantial damage to property or similar injury resulting from the unlawful action of a third party or from a natural emergency. Notwithstanding this policy statement, personal financial difficulties and economic pressures upon a trade or business do not warrant a downward departure.

- Diminished capacity (§5K2.13)

A downward departure may be warranted if (1) the defendant committed the offense while suffering from a significantly reduced mental capacity; and (2) the significantly reduced mental capacity contributed substantially to the commission of the offense. Similarly, if a departure is warranted under this policy statement, the extent of the departure should reflect the extent to which the reduced mental capacity contributed to the commission of the offense. However, the court may not depart below the applicable guideline range if (1) the significantly reduced mental capacity was caused by the voluntary use of drugs or other intoxicants; (2) the facts and circumstances of the defendant's offense indicate a need to protect the public because the offense involved actual violence or a serious threat of violence; (3) the defendant's criminal history indicates a need to incarcerate the defendant to protect the public; or (4) the defendant has been convicted of an offense under chapter 71, 109A, 110, or 117, of title 18, United States Code.

- Public welfare (§5K2.14)

If national security, public health, or safety was significantly endangered, the court may depart upward to reflect the nature and circumstances of the offense.

- Voluntary disclosure of offense (§5K2.16)

If the defendant voluntarily discloses to authorities the existence of, and accepts responsibility for, the offense prior to the discovery of such offense, and if such offense was unlikely to have been discovered otherwise, a downward departure may be warranted. For example, a downward departure under this section might be considered where a defendant, motivated by remorse, discloses an offense that otherwise would have remained undiscovered. This provision does not apply where the motivating factor is the defendant's knowledge that discovery of the offense is likely or imminent, or where the defendant's disclosure occurs in connection with the investigation or prosecution of the defendant for related conduct.

- Semiautomatic firearms capable of accepting large capacity magazines (§5K2.17)

If the defendant possessed a semiautomatic firearm capable of accepting a large capacity magazine in connection with a crime of violence or controlled substance offense, an upward departure may be warranted. A semiautomatic firearm capable of accepting a large capacity magazine' means a semiautomatic firearm that has the ability to fire many rounds without reloading because at the time of the offense (A) the firearm had attached to it a magazine or similar device that could accept more than 15 rounds of ammunition; or (B) a magazine or similar device that could accept more than 15 rounds of ammunition was in close proximity to the firearm. The extent of any increase should depend upon the degree to which the nature of the weapon increased the likelihood of death or injury in the circumstances of the particular case.

- Violent street gangs (§5K2.18)

If the defendant is subject to an enhanced sentence under 18 U.S.C. § 521 (pertaining to criminal street gangs), an upward departure may be warranted. The purpose of this departure provision is to enhance the sentences of defendants who participate in groups, clubs, organizations, or associations that use violence to further their ends. It is to be noted that there may be cases in which 18 U.S.C. § 521 applies, but no violence is established. In such cases, it is expected that the guidelines will account adequately for the conduct and, consequently, this departure provision would not apply.

- Post-sentencing rehabilitative efforts (§5K2.19)

Prior to October 2010:

[p]ost-sentencing rehabilitative efforts, even if exceptional, undertaken by a defendant after imposition of a term of imprisonment for the instant offense [were] not an appropriate basis for a downward departure when resentencing the defendant for that offense.

After Pepper v. United States (2011) but before November 1, 2012:

When a defendant's sentence has been set aside on appeal, a district court at resentencing may consider evidence of the defendant's postsentencing rehabilitation, and such evidence may, in appropriate cases, support a downward variance from the now-advisory Guidelines range.

After November 1, 2012:

Deleted.

- Aberrant behavior (§5K2.20)

(a) IN GENERAL.—Except where a defendant is convicted of an offense involving a minor victim under section 1201, an offense under section 1591, or an offense under chapter 71, 109A, 110, or 117, of title 18, United States Code, a downward departure may be warranted in an exceptional case if:

1. the defendant's criminal conduct meets the requirements of subsection (b); and
2. the departure is not prohibited under subsection (c)

(b) REQUIREMENTS.—The court may depart downward under this policy statement only if the defendant committed a single criminal occurrence or single criminal transaction that

1. was committed without significant planning;
2. was of limited duration; and
3. represents a marked deviation by the defendant from an otherwise law-abiding life.

(c) PROHIBITIONS BASED ON THE PRESENCE OF CERTAIN CIRCUMSTANCES.—The court may not depart downward pursuant to this policy statement if any of the following circumstances are present:

1. The offense involved serious bodily injury or death.
2. The defendant discharged a firearm or otherwise used a firearm or a dangerous weapon.
3. The instant offense of conviction is a serious drug trafficking offense.
4. The defendant has either of the following: (A) more than one criminal history point, as determined under Chapter Four (Criminal History and Criminal Livelihood) before application of subsection (b) of §4A1.3 (Departures Based on Inadequacy of Criminal History Category); or (B) a prior federal or state felony conviction, or any other significant prior criminal behavior, regardless of whether the conviction or significant prior criminal behavior is countable under Chapter Four.

- Dismissed and uncharged conduct (§5K2.21)

The court may depart upward to reflect the actual seriousness of the offense based on conduct (1) underlying a charge dismissed as part of a plea agreement in the case, or underlying a potential charge not pursued in the case as part of a plea agreement or for any other reason; and (2) that did not enter into the determination of the applicable guideline range.

- Specific offender characteristics as grounds for downward departure in child crimes and sexual offenses (§5K2.22)

In sentencing a defendant convicted of an offense involving a minor victim under section 1201, an offense under section 1591, or an offense under chapter 71, 109A, 110, or 117, of title 18, United States Code:

1. Age may be a reason to depart downward only if and to the extent permitted by §5H1.1.
2. An extraordinary physical impairment may be a reason to depart downward only if and to the extent permitted by §5H1.4.
3. Drug, alcohol, or gambling dependence or abuse is not a reason to depart downward.

- Discharged terms of imprisonment (§5K2.23)

A downward departure may be appropriate if the defendant (1) has completed serving a term of imprisonment; and (2) subsection (b) of §5G1.3 (Imposition of a Sentence on a Defendant Subject to Undischarged Term of Imprisonment) would have provided an adjustment had that completed term of imprisonment been undischarged at the time of sentencing for the instant offense. Any such departure should be fashioned to achieve a reasonable punishment for the instant offense.

- Commission of offense while wearing or displaying unauthorized or counterfeit insignia or uniform (§5K2.24)

If, during the commission of the offense, the defendant wore or displayed an official, or counterfeit official, insignia or uniform received in violation of 18 U.S.C. § 716, an upward departure may be warranted.

== Controversies ==
Among the controversial aspects of the Sentencing Guidelines have been the 100:1 disparity between treatment of crack and cocaine (which has been amended to 18:1 by the Fair Sentencing Act of 2010) and the immigration guidelines which call for hefty enhancements for illegal re-entrants with prior felony records, despite the prior offenses already being taken into account via the Criminal History Category. Heavy penalties for child pornography offenders have also come under fire. Many judges are refusing to apply the Guidelines in these cases.

It has been argued that the Sentencing Guidelines actually increase unwarranted sentencing disparities. Joseph S. Hall writes, "Factors such as whether or not the defendant can afford a skilled attorney capable of making innovative legal arguments or performing detailed factual investigations have a profound influence on a defendant's sentence. The prosecutor's power to extract guilty pleas, previously held in check by judges, is now counterbalanced only by the diligence of the defense attorney." William J. Stuntz claims that "when necessary, the litigants simply bargain about what facts will (and won't) form the basis for sentencing. It seems to be an iron rule: guidelines sentencing empowers prosecutors, even where the guidelines' authors try to fight that tendency ... In short, plea bargains outside the law's shadow depend on prosecutors' ability to make credible threats of severe post-trial sentences. Sentencing guidelines make it easy to issue those threats."

The federal guilty plea rate has risen from 83% in 1983 to 96% in 2009, a rise attributed largely to the Sentencing Guidelines.

== Sentencing table ==
The sentencing table is an integral part of the U.S. Sentencing Guidelines.

The Offense Level (1–43) forms the vertical axis of the Sentencing Table. The Criminal History Category (I–VI) forms the horizontal axis of the Table. The intersection of the Offense Level and Criminal History Category displays the Guideline Range in months of imprisonment. "Life" means life imprisonment. For example, the guideline range applicable to a defendant with an Offense Level of 15 and a Criminal History Category of III is 24–30 months of imprisonment. If all counts that carry the maximum sentence of 5–40 years total the level to 43 and above, then a life sentence is restricted. For a defendant under the Juvenile Delinquency Act, the sentence is 50 years for Levels 43 and up.

Sentencing Table Effective Nov. 2012 (showing months of imprisonment)
Offense Level ↓		Criminal History Category (Criminal History Points)					
Offense Level ↓		I (0 or 1)	II (2 or 3)	III (4, 5, 6)	IV (7, 8, 9)	V (10, 11, 12)	VI (13+)
Zone A	1	0–6	0–6	0–6	0–6	0–6	0–6
Zone A	2	0–6	0–6	0–6	0–6	0–6	1–7
Zone A	3	0–6	0–6	0–6	0–6	2–8	3–9
Zone A	4	0–6	0–6	0–6	2–8	4–10	6–12
Zone A	5	0–6	0–6	1–7	4–10	6–12	9–15
Zone A	6	0–6	1–7	2–8	6–12	9–15	12–18
Zone A	7	0–6	2–8	4–10	8–14	12–18	15–21
Zone A	8	0–6	4–10	6–12	10–16	15–21	18–24
Zone B	9	4–10	6–12	8–14	12–18	18–24	21–27
Zone B	10	6–12	8–14	10–16	15–21	21–27	24–30
Zone B	11	8–14	10–16	12–18	18–24	24–30	27–33
Zone C	12	10–16	12–18	15–21	21–27	27–33	30–37
Zone C	13	12–18	15–21	18–24	24–30	30–37	33–41
Zone D	14	15–21	18–24	21–27	27–33	33–41	37–46
Zone D	15	18–24	21–27	24–30	30–37	37–46	41–51
Zone D	16	21–27	24–30	27–33	33–41	41–51	46–57
Zone D	17	24–30	27–33	30–37	37–46	46–57	51–63
Zone D	18	27–33	30–37	33–41	41–51	51–63	57–71
Zone D	19	30–37	33–41	37–46	46–57	57–71	63–78
Zone D	20	33–41	37–46	41–51	51–63	63–78	70–87
Zone D	21	37–46	41–51	46–57	57–71	70–87	77–96
Zone D	22	41–51	46–57	51–63	63–78	77–96	84–105
Zone D	23	46–57	51–63	57–71	70–87	84–105	92–115
Zone D	24	51–63	57–71	63–78	77–96	92–115	100–125
Zone D	25	57–71	63–78	70–87	84–105	100–125	110–137
Zone D	26	63–78	70–87	78–97	92–115	110–137	120–150
Zone D	27	70–87	78–97	87–108	100–125	120–150	130–162
Zone D	28	78–97	87–108	97–121	110–137	130–162	140–175
Zone D	29	87–108	97–121	108–135	121–151	140–175	151–188
Zone D	30	97–121	108–135	121–151	135–168	151–188	168–210
Zone D	31	108–135	121–151	135–168	151–188	168–210	188–235
Zone D	32	121–151	135–168	151–188	168–210	188–235	210–262
Zone D	33	135–168	151–188	168–210	188–235	210–262	235–293
Zone D	34	151–188	168–210	188–235	210–262	235–293	262–327
Zone D	35	168–210	188–235	210–262	235–293	262–327	292–365
Zone D	36	188–235	210–262	235–293	262–327	292–365	324–405
Zone D	37	210–262	235–293	262–327	292–365	324–405	360–life
Zone D	38	235–293	262–327	292–365	324–405	360–life	360–life
Zone D	39	262–327	292–365	324–405	360–life	360–life	360–life
Zone D	40	292–365	324–405	360–life	360–life	360–life	360–life
Zone D	41	324–405	360–life	360–life	360–life	360–life	360–life
Zone D	42	360–life	360–life	360–life	360–life	360–life	360–life
Zone D	43	life	life	life	life	life	life

== Fines ==
For individuals, the fine table is as follows:

Offense level	Minimum	Maximum
3 and below	$200	$9,500
4–5	$500	$9,500
6–7	$1,000	$9,500
8–9	$2,000	$20,000
10–11	$4,000	$40,000
12–13	$5,500	$55,000
14–15	$7,500	$75,000
16–17	$10,000	$95,000
18–19	$10,000	$100,000
20–22	$15,000	$150,000
23–25	$20,000	$200,000
26–28	$25,000	$250,000
29–31	$30,000	$300,000
32–34	$35,000	$350,000
35–37	$40,000	$400,000
38 and above	$50,000	$500,000

The Guidelines state that the court can impose a fine above the maximum set out in the table if the defendant is convicted under a statute authorizing a maximum fine greater than $250,000, or a fine for each day of violation. The court can waive the fine if the defendant is unlikely to be able to pay or if the fine would unduly burden the defendant's dependents; however, the Guidelines state that the court must still impose a total combined sanction that is punitive.

== Probation and supervised release ==
The Guidelines state that the term of probation shall be at least one year but not more than five years if the offense level is 6 or greater, and no more than three years in any other case. The Guidelines provide that the term of supervised release under U.S. federal law shall be at least three years but not more than five years for a defendant convicted of a Class A or B felony; at least two years but not more than three years for a defendant convicted of a Class C or D felony; and one year for a defendant convicted of a Class E felony or a Class A misdemeanor. However, a life term of supervised release may be imposed for any offense listed in 18 U.S.C. § 2332b(g)(5)(B), the commission of which resulted in, or created a foreseeable risk of, death or serious bodily injury to another person; or a sex offense. Supervised release is recommended by the Guidelines for most offenders who are serving a prison sentence of more than a year.

== See also ==
- Apprendi v. New Jersey
- Fair Sentencing Act
- History of United States Prison Systems
- Safety valve (law)
- United States v. Binion
