= Plea =

Answer to a claim made by someone in a common law criminal case

In law, a plea is a defendant's response to a criminal charge. A defendant may plead guilty or not guilty. Depending on jurisdiction, additional pleas may be available, including nolo contendere (no contest), no case to answer (in the United Kingdom), or an Alford plea (in the United States).

Under common law systems, a defendant who pleads guilty will be convicted if the court accepts the plea. The court will then determine and impose a sentence. Plea bargaining involves discussions between the prosecutor and defendants to reach an agreement for a guilty plea in exchange for a more lenient punishment.

In civil law jurisdictions, a confession by the defendant is treated like any other piece of evidence. A full confession does not prevent a full trial or relieve the prosecutor from presenting a case to the court.

== Types of plea ==
The most common types of plea are "guilty" and "not guilty".

In some legal systems pleading guilty can result in a more lenient punishment for the defendant, thus being a type of mitigating factor in sentencing. However, in some other legal systems, pleading guilty instead can result in a harsher punishment. In a plea bargain, a defendant makes a deal with the prosecution or court to plead guilty in exchange for a more lenient punishment, or for related charges against them to be dropped. A "blind plea" is a guilty plea entered with no plea agreement in place. Plea bargains are particularly common in the United States. Other countries use a more limited form of plea bargaining. In the United Kingdom and Germany, guidelines state that only the timing of the guilty plea can affect the reduction in the punishment, with an earlier plea resulting in a greater reduction.

In the United States, a nolo contendere (no contest) plea is when the defendant submits a plea that neither admits nor denies the offense. It has the same immediate effect as a guilty plea because the trial avoids determining the defendant's guilt.

=== Peremptory pleas ===
These pleas claim that a case cannot proceed for some reason. They are so-called because, rather than being an answer to the question of guilt or innocence, they are a claim that the matter of guilt or innocence should not be considered.

They are:

- autrefois convict (or autrefois acquit) – where under the doctrine of double jeopardy, the accused has been previously convicted or acquitted of the same charge and hence cannot be tried again.
- plea of pardon – where the accused has been pardoned for the offense.

== Standing mute ==
=== Common law ===
When a defendant refuses to plead to an indictment it is called "standing mute", and it has been left to juries to decide the reason for the muteness, whether maliciousness or mental impairment. Historically, during an arraignment an accused person would enter a plea, guilty or not, and after pleading not guilty would be asked how he was to be tried, being expected to answer "By God and my country". There were various penalties for refusing to do this if one was of sound mind. In cases of piracy or felony the accused was tortured by pressing until he entered a plea; Edward Coke reported details of such during a murder trial in the reign of James I. In 1692 Giles Corey, charged with Witchcraft in New England, was pressed until he died for refusing to answer "By God and my country" after pleading not guilty to the charges. Obtaining pleas by torture was abolished by statute in 1772.

=== US criminal procedure ===
A defendant who refuses to enter a plea is usually interpreted as giving a plea of not guilty; the Federal Rules of Criminal Procedure, for instance, state, "If a defendant refuses to enter a plea or if a defendant organization fails to appear, the court must enter a plea of not guilty." Similarly, if a defendant attempts to enter an unorthodox plea (a "creative plea"), this will usually be interpreted as a plea of not guilty. One example of this was a defendant accused of a crime committed while protesting a nuclear power plant, who gave his plea as "I plead for the beauty that surrounds us".

== United States ==
=== "Voluntary and intelligent" ===
A defendant who enters a plea of guilty must do so, in the phraseology of a 1938 United States Supreme Court case, Johnson v. Zerbst, "knowingly, voluntarily and intelligently". The burden is on the prosecution to prove that all waivers of the defendant's rights complied with due process standards. Accordingly, in cases of all but the most minor offenses, the court or the prosecution (depending upon local custom and the presiding judge's preference) will engage in a plea colloquy wherein they ask the defendant a series of rote questions about the defendant's knowledge of his rights and the voluntariness of the plea. Typically the hearing on the guilty plea is transcribed by a court reporter, and the transcript is made a part of the permanent record of the case to preserve the conviction's validity from being challenged at some future time. "Intelligent" has been described as "an elusive term, meaning that the defendant knows his rights, the nature of the charge to which he is pleading, and the consequences of his plea." "Voluntary" has been described as also "an elusive term which has come to mean not induced by 'improper' inducements, such as bribing or physical violence, but not including the inducements normally associated with charge and sentence bargaining (except for inducements involving 'overcharging' by prosecutors)." Empirical research has demonstrated that violent conditions in jails during pretrial detention of people who are legally innocent do improperly induce or coerce guilty pleas, but this has not constitutionally invalidated the pleas under current Supreme Court precedent.

Virtually all jurisdictions hold that defense counsel need not discuss with defendants the collateral consequences of pleading guilty, such as consecutive sentencing or even treatment as an aggravating circumstance in an ongoing capital prosecution. However, the Supreme Court recognized an important exception in Padilla v. Kentucky (2010), in which the Court held that defense counsel is obligated to inform defendants of the potential immigration consequences of a guilty plea. Thus a defendant who is not advised of immigration consequences may have an ineffective assistance of counsel argument.

In the U.S. federal system, the court must also satisfy itself that there is a factual basis for the guilty plea. However, this safeguard may not be very effective because the parties, having reached a plea agreement, may be reluctant to reveal any information that could disturb the agreement. When a plea agreement has been made, the judge's factual basis inquiry is usually perfunctory, and the standard for finding that the plea is factually based is very low.

=== Special pleas ===
Other special pleas used in criminal cases include the plea of mental incompetence, challenging the jurisdiction of the court over the defendant's person, the plea in bar, attacking the jurisdiction of the court over the crime charged, and the plea in abatement, which is used to address procedural errors in bringing the charges against the defendant, not apparent on the "face" of the indictment or other charging instrument. Special pleas in federal criminal cases have been abolished, and defenses formerly raised by special pleas are now raised by motion to dismiss.

A conditional plea is one where the defendant pleads guilty to the offense but expressly reserves the right to appeal certain aspects of the charges (for example, that the evidence was illegally obtained).

In United States v. Binion, malingering or feigning illness during a competency evaluation was held to be obstruction of justice and led to an enhanced sentence. Although the defendant had pleaded guilty, he was not awarded a reduction in sentence because the feigned illness was considered to mean that he was not accepting responsibility for his illegal behavior.

== United Kingdom ==
=== "Unambiguous plea" ===
A defendant who enters a plea of guilty must do so unequivocally. A guilty plea which is "imperfect, unfinished or otherwise ambiguous" will not legitimate and should the court proceed to sentence on such a plea, there exist grounds for ordering a retrial or quashing the conviction.

In R v Atkinson, the Court of Appeal held that, where a defendant entered a plea of 'Guilty, but I intended to defend myself' this could be held to be an unequivocal plea where the judge had clarified any ambiguity before accepting the plea.

=== Special pleas ===
Three special pleas (though not in the strictest sense of the word) exist in the criminal courts of England and Wales:

Demurrer: Which is an "objection to the form or substance of the indictment". It is essentially no different than a motion to quash the indictment, however, it continues to exist in law. Unlike standard pleas, this must be entered in writing in advance of the arraignment.

Plea to jurisdiction: Can be entered where the defendant believes the Crown Court does not have the power to hear the case before it, such a plea is usually entered where the offence being charged is summary only. Similarly to Demurrer, this plea must be entered in writing in advance.

Pardon: "It may be relied on where a pardon has been granted by the Crown on the advice of the Home Secretary in exercise of the royal prerogative of mercy. It must be pleaded at the first opportunity (i.e. before arraignment if the pardon has by then been granted). In modern times, the plea has become obsolete."

== Plea in mitigation ==
A plea in mitigation is used during criminal law proceedings in many Commonwealth countries. It typically involves a lawyer telling a judge of extenuating circumstances that could result in a lesser sentence for an offender.

== See also ==
- Pleading
