= United States v. Binion =

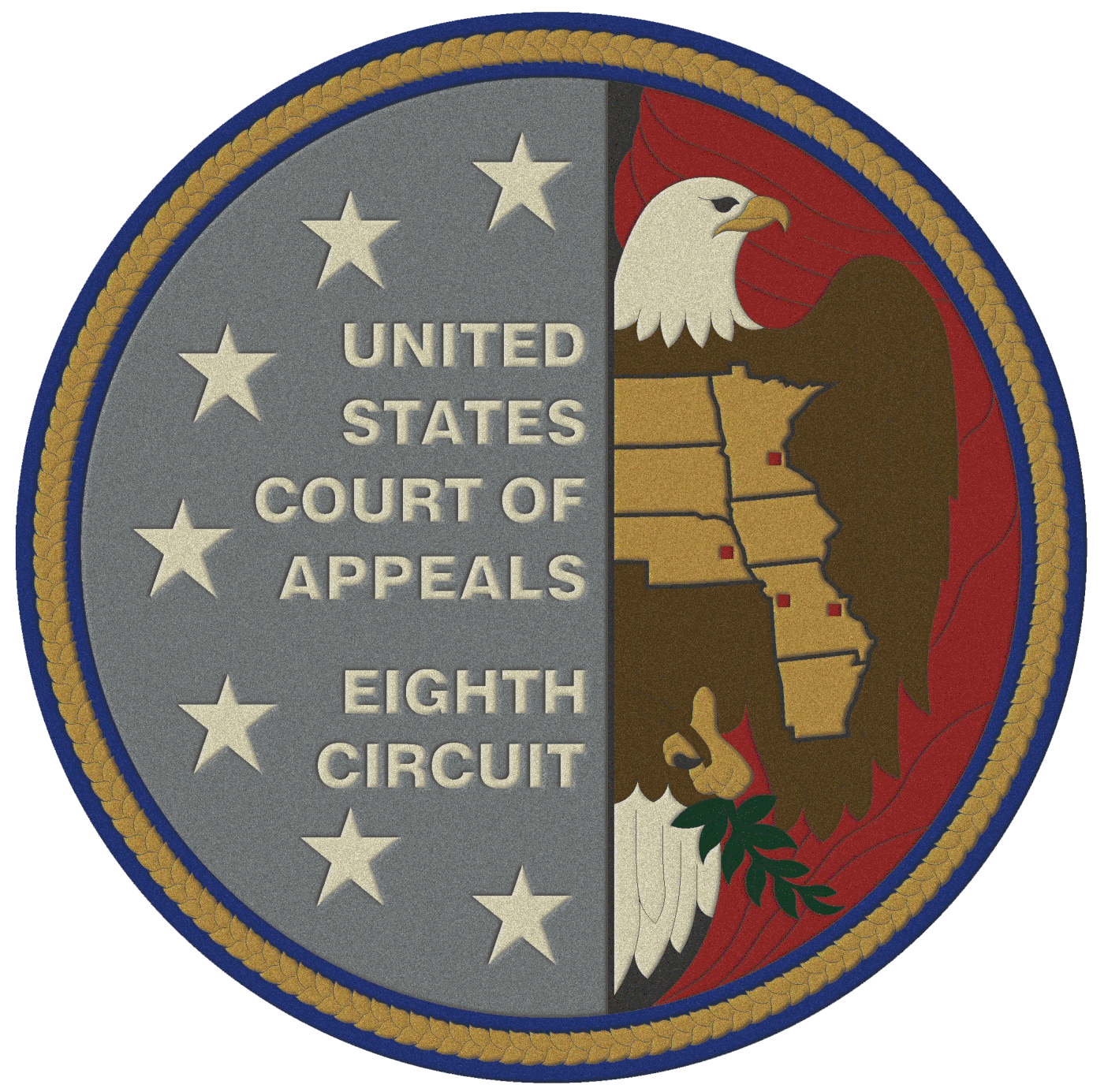
- Court: United States Court of Appeals for the Eighth Circuit
- Full case name: United States of America v. Dammeon Binion
- Submitted: December 14, 2004
- Decided: May 23, 2005
- Citation: 132 F. App'x 89

Case history
- Subsequent history: Cert. denied, 546 U.S. 919 (2005)

Court membership
- Judges sitting: Michael Joseph Melloy, Myron H. Bright, Duane Benton

Case opinions
- Per curiam

Laws applied
- Federal Sentencing Guidelines

United States v. Binion, 132 F. App'x 89 (8th Cir. 2005), is a case in which the United States Court of Appeals for the Eighth Circuit applied two recent U.S. Supreme Court decisions, United States v. Booker and United States v. Fanfan, in upholding the sentencing decision by the trial court, the United States District Court for the Eastern District of Missouri.

== Circumstances ==
Dammeon Binion was arrested for possession of a firearm by a convicted felon. Representing himself, the defendant filed a pro se motion for a competence-to-stand-trial evaluation in which psychological tests were administered by a psychologist under the supervision of a psychiatrist who integrated the results and reported them to the court. Based on the test results and the discrepancy between these results and the defendant's observed behavior, the psychiatrist concluded that the defendant was most likely feigning mental illness and had no mental disorder. He further stated that the defendant's malingering was a "form of recreation rather than a design to accomplish secondary material gain".

The defendant pleaded guilty to the offense. However, because of his reported malingering, he was also charged with obstruction of justice, which added two points to the sentencing recommendations. The court stated that because of the feigned illness, the defendant was not accepting responsibility for his behavior as is normally required in a plea of guilty, and the normal reduction in sentence for a guilty plea was therefore waived. The defendant was sentenced according to the guidelines recommended by the pre-sentence investigation.

== Appeal ==
The defendant appealed his sentence on three grounds. First he claimed that by increasing his sentence by adding the charge of obstruction of justice, related to his feigning mental illness, the trial court had violated United States v. Booker (2005). In this case, the United States Supreme Court ruled that the Sixth Amendment required the determination beyond a reasonable doubt of the validity of any fact that increased the sentence of a defendant in a federal criminal case over the highest level of the range as set forth by the Federal Sentencing Guidelines. Second, although acknowledging the feigned mental illness, the defendant stated he did so to amuse himself and without specific intent to obstruct justice, and that therefore the court erred in so charging him and enhancing his sentence accordingly. Third, he argued that because the trial court did not view the defendant as accepting responsibility for his offense even though he pleaded guilty, the court had erred in failing to reduce the defendant's sentence as part of the guilty plea.

== Ruling ==
The U.S. Eighth Circuit Court of Appeals affirmed the judgment of the district court on each of the three grounds raised. Booker was followed in allowing judicial discretion in applying the sentencing guidelines. Thus, the enhancement for obstruction of justice for feigning mental illness on his competency evaluation, adding two points to the sentencing recommendations, was upheld, as was the ruling that because of the feigned illness, the defendant was not accepting responsibility for his behavior for the purposes of a guilty plea, and therefore no reduction in sentence was appropriate. The defendant's sentence, as determined by the trial judge's discretion, was upheld.

== Significance ==
The case is significant because of the issues it raises if a legal decision is based on the testimony of mental health professionals, by means of forensic psychology. First, it points to a difficult issue in competency evaluations. Although the standards for competency were set forth in Dusky v. United States, much of the standard remains ambiguous and is not clearly defined. Only one common principle is clear in forensic evaluations, that forensic evaluators cannot reach a finding independent of the facts of the case at hand.

Second, many practitioners feel strongly that forensic evaluators should restrict themselves to behavioral observations and describing test results only, and avoid making statements on legal questions as transpired in this case. This case makes it all the more important that the forensic evaluator clarify to the defendant that any information obtained will not be kept confidential, since the defendant has no control over how this information will be used.

Third, the issue of malingering is particularly problematic as there is no ultimate test, and such diagnoses boil down to clinical decisions. An extensive review of the literature by Melton et al. did not reveal any studies in which clinicians using various combinations of testing procedures and interviews demonstrated any "extraordinary ability" to detect malingering.
