= Santos Reyes (prisoner) =

Santos Reyes is a prisoner at Folsom Prison in the state of California who became a focal point of an effort to overturn the state's three strikes law. The case has attracted widespread media attention, including coverage in the Los Angeles Times, the San Francisco Chronicle, Reuters, the Pasadena Weekly, and elsewhere. It has been hailed as a particularly egregious example of how California's three strikes law has led to the "incarceration of thousands of victims indicted on relatively minor charges."

== Arrest and conviction ==
In 1997 Reyes filled out an application for a driver's license under the name of his cousin, Miguel Soto. Reports differ as to whether the application was in Spanish or English, and whether the application stated that information was being provided under penalty of perjury. Upon being suspected for using a crib sheet to cheat on the test by DMV staff member Debra Alexander, Alexander confiscated the exam from Reyes and reported Reyes, who had left the DMV building, to the California Highway Patrol. After submitting to a pat down and being handcuffed, Reyes claimed that he had attempted to take the test for Soto. Prior to trial, Reyes was offered a deal of four years imprisonment in exchange for a guilty plea to the charge of perjury, but he rejected the plea deal and requested a jury trial. He was convicted on March 5, 1998, of perjury. Reyes qualified for a Three Strikes enhancement because of two prior convictions: one for residential burglary as a juvenile in 1981, and a second for armed robbery in 1987. On April 2, 1998, the trial court sentenced Reyes to an indeterminate term of 26 years to life.

== Controversy ==
Circuit Judge Richard C. Tallman argued that the characterization of Reyes as a victim of excessive punishment for cheating on a driver's license exam was incorrect. Tallman pointed out that Reyes was convicted for knowingly filing a false document under oath. Tallman also argued that supporters of Reyes had understated his criminality. Tallman described Reyes as "a career criminal" who had been convicted of committing six crimes in a 16-year period, including battery, armed robbery, being under the influence of a controlled substance and driving while under the influence, and who had spent six years in prison for various offenses prior to his sentencing under the three strikes law.

Supporters of Reyes such as San Francisco mayoral candidate Matt Gonzales argued that the sentence was an "egregious example of injustice" because his most recent crime amounted to little more than "cheating on a driver's license test." Reyes has been described as "something of a modern-day Jean Valjean." Judge Harry Pregerson pointed out that "Signing someone else's name on a driver's license application is specifically proscribed by the California legislature as a misdemeanor." Pregerson argued that neither of the previous convictions met the standard intended by the Three Strikes law, since the first strike (burglary) involved nonviolent misbehavior as a juvenile and the second strike (robbery) did not involve harm to a person. Moreover, over eleven years had elapsed since the second strike, which was committed by Reyes at age 23.

== Campaign to free Santos Reyes ==
California Green Party gubernatorial candidate Peter Camejo founded the Free Santos Reyes Committee to campaign for Reyes's release. The Latino activist organization National Latino Congreso passed a resolution calling on California Governor Arnold Schwarzenegger to pardon Reyes.

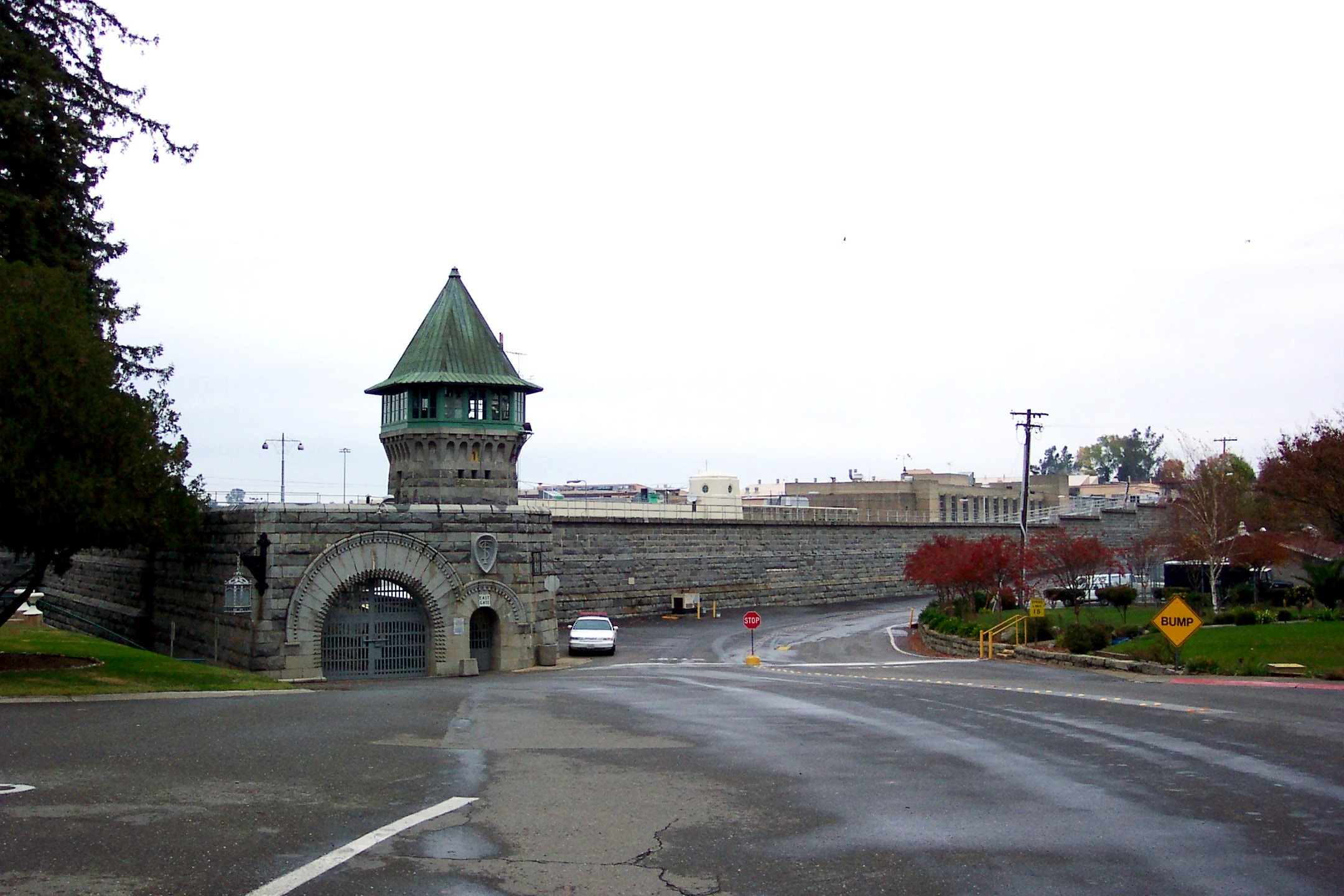
Folsom state prison in 2007.

== Chronology of appeals ==
In December 2003, the United States Court of Appeals for the Ninth Circuit in San Francisco upheld the 1998 sentencing of Santo Reyes. In a 2–1 ruling the court rejected the argument that Reyes's conviction violated the U.S. Constitution's prohibition against "cruel and unusual punishment." The Appeals Court ruling came on the heels of a U.S. Supreme Court ruling in March 2003 upholding the sentence of 50 years to life for a man with two prior convictions found guilty of shoplifting videotapes. In a dissent, Judge Harry Pregerson noted that the reason Reyes had received the third-strike sentence was that he had chosen to go to trial rather than accept a plea bargain for a lesser offense, which would have carried a four-year sentence. Pregerson said, "I believe that punishing a person for exercising his or her constitutional rights clearly violates due process."

In 2005, the Ninth Circuit vacated the district court's denial of Reyes' petition challenging his sentence and remanded the case to district court for further proceedings.

On September 13, 2006, the Free Santos Reyes Committee held a rally and vigil in front of the U.S. District Court in Los Angeles. Inside the courtroom, Reyes attempted to persuade the federal magistrate that he had not wielded a knife during a 1986 robbery that provided the second of his three "strikes." The issue of whether a knife was used in the robbery or carried by Reyes on his person was a crucial issue, since none of Reyes's other convictions involved violence.
