= United States v. Booker =

- Supreme Court of the United States

Argued October 4, 2004 Decided January 12, 2005
- Full case name: United States v. Freddie J. Booker; United States v. Ducan Fanfan
- Docket no.: 04-104
- Citations: 543 U.S. 220 (more) 125 S. Ct. 738; 160 L. Ed. 2d 621; 2005 U.S. LEXIS 628; 73 U.S.L.W. 4056; 18 Fla. L. Weekly Fed. S 70

Case history
- Prior: Recommendation to deny motion to quash, No. 03-026, 2003 U.S. Dist. LEXIS 24609 (W.D. Wis. Sept. 5, 2003); defendant convicted, sentenced, W.D. Wis; sentence reversed and remanded, 375 F.3d 508 (7th Cir. 2004), cert. granted, 542 U.S. 956 (2004).
- Subsequent: Amended January 24, 2005. On remand, defendant resentenced, W.D. Wis.; affirmed, 149 Fed. Appx. 517 (7th Cir. 2005)

Questions presented
- 1. Whether the Sixth Amendment is violated by the imposition of an enhanced sentence under the United States Sentencing Guidelines based on the sentencing judge's determination of a fact (other than a prior conviction) that was not found by the jury or admitted by the defendant.; 2. If the answer to the first question is "yes," the following question is presented: whether, in a case in which the Guidelines would require the court to find a sentence-enhancing fact, the Sentencing Guidelines as a whole would be inapplicable, as a matter of severability analysis, such that the sentencing court must exercise its discretion to sentence the defendant within the maximum and minimum set by statute for the offense of conviction.

Holding
- 1. Blakely v. Washington applies to the Federal Sentencing Guidelines and requires all facts that increase the defendant's punishment beyond the Guidelines range applicable to the offense of conviction to be proved to a jury beyond a reasonable doubt.; 2. As a result, the provision of the federal sentencing statute that makes the Guidelines mandatory is stricken, and in imposing sentences, district courts must instead focus on a broader range; appellate courts are to review sentences for "reasonableness."

Court membership
- Chief Justice William Rehnquist Associate Justices John P. Stevens · Sandra Day O'Connor; Antonin Scalia · Anthony Kennedy; David Souter · Clarence Thomas; Ruth Bader Ginsburg · Stephen Breyer

Case opinions
- Majority: Stevens (in part), joined by Scalia, Souter, Thomas, Ginsburg
- Majority: Breyer (in part), joined by Rehnquist, O'Connor, Kennedy, Ginsburg
- Dissent: Stevens (in part), joined by Souter; Scalia (except Part III and footnote 17)
- Dissent: Scalia (in part)
- Dissent: Thomas (in part)
- Dissent: Breyer (in part), joined by Rehnquist, O'Connor, Kennedy

Laws applied
- U.S. Const. amend. VI; 18 U.S.C. §§ 3553, 3742

United States v. Booker, 543 U.S. 220 (2005), is a United States Supreme Court decision on criminal sentencing. The Court ruled that the Sixth Amendment right to jury trial requires that other than a prior conviction, only facts admitted by a defendant or proved beyond a reasonable doubt to a jury may be used to calculate a sentence exceeding the prescribed statutory maximum sentence, whether the defendant has pleaded guilty or been convicted at trial. The maximum sentence that a judge may impose is based upon the facts admitted by the defendant or proved to a jury beyond a reasonable doubt.

In its majority decision, the Court struck down the provision of the federal sentencing statute that required federal district judges to impose a sentence within the United States Federal Sentencing Guidelines range, along with the provision that deprived federal appeals courts of the power to review sentences imposed outside the range. The Court instructed federal district judges to impose a sentence with reference to a wider range of sentencing factors set forth in the federal sentencing statute, and it directed federal appeals courts to review criminal sentences for "reasonableness," which the Court left undefined.

The constitutional ruling in Booker was a direct consequence of the Court's ruling six months earlier in Blakely v. Washington, in which the Court had imposed the same requirement on a guidelines sentencing scheme employed in Washington state. Blakely arose out of Apprendi v. New Jersey and Ring v. Arizona in which the Court held that except for a prior conviction, any fact that increases the defendant's punishment above the statutory maximum punishment must be submitted to a jury and proved beyond a reasonable doubt.

== Background ==
=== Booker ===
In 2003, Freddie Joe Booker was arrested after police officers found 92.5 grams of crack cocaine in his duffel bag. He later gave a written statement to the police that admitted to selling an additional 566 grams of crack cocaine. In 2003, a jury in the United States District Court for the Western District of Wisconsin found Booker guilty of possessing with intent to distribute at least 50 grams of cocaine base. Federal law provided for a statutory sentence of ten years to life in prison.

At sentencing, the judge found by a preponderance of the evidence that the defendant (1) distributed 566 grams over and above the 100 grams that the jury had to have found and (2) had obstructed justice. Under the Federal Sentencing Guidelines, that increased the defendant's base offense level from 32 to 36 (U.S.S.G. §§ 2D1.1(c)(2),(4)). The enhancement for the drug possession and obstruction of justice (U.S.S.G. § 3C1.1) made Booker's sentencing range of 30 years to life; the judge sentenced Booker to the minimum.

Booker appealed to the United States Court of Appeals for the Seventh Circuit, claiming the sentencing guidelines violated his Sixth Amendment rights since the judge was able to find facts absent the findings of the jury, other than his criminal history, to determine his sentencing range. The Seventh Circuit affirmed Booker's conviction but found the application of the Guidelines violated the Sixth Amendment, as interpreted in Blakely, and so reversed Booker's sentence. The Government appealed the Seventh Circuit's ruling to the Supreme Court.

=== Fanfan ===
Narcotics agents discovered 2.5 kilograms of cocaine and 281.6 grams of cocaine base in Ducan Fanfan's vehicle and arrested him. A jury in the US District Court for the District of Maine found that Fanfan had conspired to distribute and to possess with the intent to distribute at least 500 grams of cocaine, in violation of 21 U.S.C. § 846, 21 U.S.C. § 841(a)(1) and 841(b)(1)(B)(ii). The maximum sentence for Fanfan under the Federal Guidelines, without any additional findings, was 78 months in prison.

At sentencing, the judge, by a preponderance of the evidence, determined that Fanfan was responsible for 2.5 kilograms of cocaine powder and 261.6 grams of crack and was an organizer, leader, manager, or supervisor in the criminal activity. That would have resulted 188 to 235 months sentence under the Guidelines, which was a 10-year increase in the sentencing range from what the jury had found. The Supreme Court had issued Blakely four days before the judge imposed Fanfan's sentence. The sentencing judge, believing that Blakely had implications on federal judges increasing sentences on facts not found by juries, imposed the maximum sentence, 78 months, based on the jury's verdict. The government asked the judge to correct Fanfan's sentence, which was denied.

=== Consolidation ===
The Government filed a notice of appeal to the United States Court of Appeals for the First Circuit and a petition for a writ of certiorari before judgment in the Supreme Court in the Fanfan case. Because of the importance of the case, the Supreme Court granted the petition, as well as a similar petition for certiorari filed by the government in Booker's case, following the Seventh Circuit's ruling in favor of Booker. The Government asked the Court to determine whether Apprendi applied to the Sentencing Guidelines and which of the Guidelines were constitutional.

== Decision ==
The decision of the Supreme Court was announced by two different groups of Justices. Justice Stevens wrote the majority opinion answering the question of whether the application of the Guidelines in these two cases violated the Sixth Amendment as articulated in the Apprendi line of cases. Justice Breyer wrote the majority opinion answering the question of how to remedy the Sixth Amendment violation identified by the Court.

=== Constitutional holding ===
As applied to modern sentencing schemes, the Sixth Amendment demands that, other than the fact of a prior conviction, any fact that increases the defendant's punishment above the statutory maximum must be submitted to a jury and proved beyond a reasonable doubt. The "statutory maximum" is the greatest sentence the judge can impose based solely on the jury's fact finding. In a guidelines sentencing scheme that requires judges to impose a sentence within the guideline range, the jury-trial and reasonable-doubt requirements apply to the determination of any fact that exposes the defendant to punishment above the guideline range.

The Federal Sentencing Guidelines, like the Washington sentencing guidelines discussed in Blakely, were mandatory; sentencing judges were required to impose sentences within the range dictated by the Guidelines. In this sense, the decision in Blakely dictated the constitutional holding that the rule of Apprendi, as construed in Blakely, applies to the Federal Sentencing Guidelines.

The Government made three principal arguments against applying Blakely to the Federal Sentencing Guidelines, all of which the Court rejected.

==== Commission versus Legislature ====
The Federal Sentencing Guidelines were promulgated by a sentencing commission; the Washington sentencing guidelines at issue in Blakely, by contrast, were enacted by that state's legislature. That distinction, the Court said, "lacked constitutional significance," because regardless of the body that set the rules, the rules required sentencing judges to increase sentences on the basis of particular facts not submitted to the jury and proved beyond a reasonable doubt. "Regardless of whether the legal basis of the accusation [against the defendant] is in a statute or in guidelines promulgated by an independent commission, the principles behind the jury trial right are equally applicable" to each.

==== Stare decisis ====
The Government identified four recent cases that, it argued, precluded the Court from applying Blakely to the Guidelines under the principles of stare decisis. First, United States v. Dunnigan, 507 U.S. 87 (1993), held that the Guidelines provision that provided for an enhanced sentence if the defendant committed perjury during the trial did not violate the defendant's Fifth Amendment privilege against self-incrimination. In Dunnigan, the Court had no occasion to consider whether the jury-trial right applied to that particular provision. Furthermore, although a sentence based on such an enhancement had the potential to exceed the statutory maximum, this did not mean that the judge had to impose such a sentence. "Thus, while the reach of Dunnigan may be limited, we need not overrule it."

Next, Witte v. United States, 515 U.S. 389 (1995), in which the Court held conduct that supported an enhancement in a prior case did not prevent a separate criminal prosecution for the same conduct, did not prevent applying Blakely to the Guidelines. This was so because, ultimately, the conduct in the two respective cases was subject to two different burdens of proof. The Court considered the converse of the Witte rule in United States v. Watts, 519 U.S. 148 (1997), where it held that conduct of which the defendant had been acquitted could nevertheless support a sentence enhancement under the Guidelines. In neither case had the Court considered whether the sentence enhancements in question were subject to the jury-trial requirement. "The issue we confront today simply was not presented."

Finally, Edwards v. United States, 523 U.S. 511 (1998), in which the Court allowed a sentence for a drug conspiracy involving both powder and crack cocaine to rest on both drugs in the face of a general verdict not specifying whether the jury believed the conspiracy involved either powder cocaine or crack cocaine or both, did not prevent the Court from applying Blakely to the Guidelines. In Edwards, the defendants could not have argued that the powder and crack cocaine were not part of the same overall conspiracy; hence, the Court's ruling in that case was not inconsistent with applying Blakely to the Guidelines.

==== Separation of powers ====
The Government argued that applying the jury-trial requirement to sentencing enhancements promulgated by a commission would transform those enhancements into a criminal code, resulting in an unconstitutional delegation of legislative power to the judicial branch. In Mistretta v. United States, the Court had upheld the delegation of such legislative power to a body in the judicial branch, reasoning that the judicial branch had the power to exercise other quasi-legislative functions such as proposing rules of evidence and civil procedure for use in the federal courts. The United States Sentencing Commission was not performing an adjudicatory function; rather, it was exercising a policy-making power appropriate for judicial officers and uniquely within their expertise. This reasoning did not preclude applying Blakely to the Guidelines.

Thus, the Court ruled that the holding in Blakely applied to the Federal Sentencing Guidelines.

=== Remedial holding ===
The Court next confronted the question of a remedy for the constitutional violation. A different majority of the Court concluded that 18 U.S.C. § 3553(b) — the provision of the federal sentencing statute that required district courts to impose a sentence within the Guidelines range — was "incompatible" with the constitutional holding and therefore had to be "severed and excised" from the statute. Likewise, 18 U.S.C. § 3742(e), the provision that governed the handling of appeals from sentences, also had to be severed and excised, because that provision was inextricably linked with the provision that made the Guidelines mandatory. The result of severing and excising these two provisions was to make the Guidelines "effectively advisory," such that district courts could, after considering the Guidelines range, tailor a sentence that reflected the broader range of concerns set forth in the federal sentencing statute.

The Court evaluated two possible remedies in light of Congress's intent in enacting the Guidelines system. The first option, and the one preferred by the Justices who dissented from the remedial holding, "would engraft onto the existing system today's Sixth Amendment 'jury trial' requirement." The second, the one the Court ultimately adopted, made the Guidelines advisory while at the same time "maintaining a strong connection between the sentence imposed and the offender's real conduct — a connection important to the increased uniformity of sentencing that Congress intended its Guidelines system to achieve." Although both remedies would "significantly alter the system that Congress designed," the remedial majority observed that it was not possible to "maintain the judicial factfinding that Congress thought would underpin the mandatory Guidelines system" in light of the jury factfinding requirement the constitutional majority had applied to that system.

==== Jury fact-finding ====
Several considerations persuaded the Court that Congress would not have enacted the Guidelines system and made it mandatory for federal district judges to apply if it had known that a jury factfinding requirement would apply to it. First, the text of the sentencing statute required "the court" to consider "the nature and circumstances of the offense and the history and characteristics of the defendant" when imposing sentence. In context, this meant "the judge sitting alone" instead of "the judge together with the jury." When it was debating the Guidelines, Congress had intended for the judge to weigh the factors bearing on a defendant's sentence by himself.

Second, "Congress's basic statutory goal — a system that diminishes sentencing disparity — depends for its success upon judicial efforts to determine, and to base punishment upon, the real conduct that underlies the crime of conviction." Many federal crimes are defined so broadly as to encompass a vast array of underlying conduct. And other federal crimes, like robbery, can be committed in a variety of different ways. Judges typically relied on presentence reports, which set forth the relevant conduct and offender characteristics, to assist them in determining what an appropriate sentence was. Congress anticipated that, under the Guidelines, this practice would continue, and this expectation supported the Court's holdings in Witte and Watts. By contrast, imposing the jury factfinding requirement onto the Guidelines would "destroy the system" by "prevent[ing] a judge from relying on a presentence report for factual information, relevant to sentencing, uncovered after the trial," because such facts would necessarily not have been submitted to the jury during the course of the trial. This, in turn, would "weaken the tie between a sentence and an offender's real conduct."

Imagine that both Smith and Jones violate the Hobbs Act, 18 U.S.C. § 1951(a), which forbids obstructing, delaying, or affecting commerce or the movement of any article or commodity in commerce by extortion. Smith threatens to injure a co-worker if the co-worker does not advance him a few dollars from the interstate company's till. Jones threatens to injure a co-worker unless the co-worker advances him a few thousand dollars from the company's accounts, and reinforces this threat by "making certain that the co-worker's family is aware of the threat, by arranging deliveries of various dead animals to the co-worker's home to show that he is serious, and so forth." Both Smith and Jones, although they violated the same statute, created different harms as a result of their actions. Under the Guidelines, their sentences would be different. If the jury factfinding requirement were merely grafted onto the Guidelines scheme, unless prosecutors "decide to charge more than the elements of the crime," the judge would have to impose similar punishments.

Imagine next that two former felons, Johnson and Jackson, each threatened a bank teller with a gun, made off with $50,000, and injured an innocent bystander while fleeing the bank. Suppose Johnson was charged with illegal possession of a firearm under 18 U.S.C. § 922(g), and Jackson was charged with bank robbery under 18 U.S.C. § 2113(a). The Guidelines would have allowed a judge to impose similar sentences on both Johnson and Jackson, despite their being charged with different crimes. Requiring the sentence-enhancing facts to be submitted to a jury undermines the ability of the Guidelines to achieve their goal of sentence uniformity, meaning uniformity of sentences imposed for the same real conduct, not for violations of the same statute.

Furthermore, imposing the jury-factfinding requirement onto the Guidelines would prove more complex than Congress could have intended. Would the sentence enhancements have to be charged in the indictment? How could a defendant defend against specific enhancements, such as that he used a gun during the crime, while simultaneously denying his guilt entirely? The fact that the vast majority of criminal cases are resolved through plea bargains would not simplify things. Instead, it would complicate them by increasing the likelihood that any agreed-upon sentence reflects more the skill of defense counsel and the prosecutor's policies than the real conduct underlying the offense.

Such a system "would have particularly troubling consequences with respect to prosecutorial power." Because a prosecutor would control not only the charge to bring against the defendant but also the sentence enhancement, he would necessarily have the "power to decide, based on relevant information about the offense and the offender, which defendants merit heavier punishments."

Congress also would not have intended to craft a system that makes it more difficult to ratchet sentences upward than downward. Yet imposing the jury-factfinding requirement on the Guidelines would have precisely that effect. For all these reasons, the Court concluded that Congress would not have enacted the Guidelines as it did if it had known that many of the various sentence-enhancing factors would be subject to a jury-trial requirement.

==== Statutory severability ====
In order to eliminate the constitutional violation the Court had identified and at the same time tailor the federal sentencing statutes more closely to Congressional intent, the Court struck out 18 U.S.C. § 3553(b)(1), the provision of the sentencing statute that made it mandatory for district courts to impose sentences according to the Guidelines. The rest of the sentencing statute "functioned independently." It required district judges to "consider" the Guidelines sentencing range established for the applicable category of offense committed by the applicable category of defendant in order to impose a sentence that reflects the seriousness of the offense, promotes respect for the law, provides for adequate deterrence, protects the public, and provides the defendant with needed educational or vocational training or medical care.

Because the Court had struck out § 3553(b)(1), it also had to strike out 18 U.S.C. § 3742(e), the provision governing the standard for reviewing sentences on appeal. This did not impose an unnecessary obstacle for handling appeals of sentences, for "a statute that does not explicitly set forth a standard of review may do so implicitly." Before the Court's decision in Booker, § 3742(e) had instructed appellate courts to determine whether a sentence was "unreasonable" with respect to the Guidelines range. After Booker, the Court read the remaining provisions of the sentencing appeal statute to instruct appellate courts to determine whether sentences were "unreasonable" with respect to all the factors set forth in 18 U.S.C. § 3553(a) — the statute spelling out which factors district courts were required to consider in fashioning a sentence in the first instance. Though the Justices who dissented from the remedial holding called this standard unworkable, the Court reasoned that a standard of "reasonableness" was familiar from other areas of the law. Together with the Sentencing Commission, which would still collect data about criminal sentencing, the courts of appeals together are able to maintain uniformity of criminal sentences. Furthermore, if Congress was unsatisfied with this arrangement, it was free to amend the sentencing laws.

== Dissents ==
=== Stevens ===
Justice Stevens pointed out that it was possible to avoid the Sixth Amendment violation in Booker's case without making any changes to the Guidelines at all. Solely on the statute of conviction, the maximum Guidelines sentence Booker could have received was 262 months. If the prosecution had submitted the quantity of drugs to the jury, the range would have increased to between 324 and 405 months. Booker ultimately received a sentence of 360 months, one within the increased sentencing range and one which the sentencing judge could have imposed after evaluating Booker's criminal history and whether he had obstructed justice. "Because the Guidelines as written possess the virtue of combining a mandatory determination of sentencing ranges and discretionary decisions within those ranges, they allow ample latitude for judicial factfinding that does not even arguably raise any Sixth Amendment issue."

But Stevens's principal objection was that the Court had crafted a new kind of severability analysis. He started with the premise that all legislative enactments are presumed to be valid, and may only be struck down in their entirety if the law is unconstitutional in "all or nearly all of its applications," or if the invalid provision cannot be severed from the remainder of the statute. Neither of those conditions applied to the federal sentencing laws, Stevens observed, and so there was no need to adopt a third method of curing constitutional violations. After all, according to the Sentencing Commission, 45% of criminal sentences involve no enhancements whatsoever, and not all of the rest would actually implicate a defendant's Sixth Amendment rights. Furthermore, defendants may waive their jury-trial rights, and so it follows that they may also waive their Blakely rights in appropriate situations.

These two observations led Stevens to the conclusion that only a "tiny portion" of criminal sentences imposed under the mandatory Guidelines scheme would actually implicate the Blakely rule. In those cases, prosecutors, defense attorneys, and judges could cope. Indeed, after Blakely was decided, the Department of Justice instructed prosecutors to include drug quantity allegations in the indictment. Also, in many cases, Guidelines ranges overlap, and there would be no Blakely problem if the judge imposed a sentence within that overlapping range and based that sentence solely on judicial factfinding. In light of these valid applications of mandatory Guidelines (constrained by Blakely), Stevens saw no plausible way to say that the sentencing statute was unconstitutional in nearly all of its applications.

Stevens further envisioned no difficulty in applying Blakely to the Guidelines. The word "court" could just as easily refer to the judge and jury together as it could to the judge alone. Congress must presumably legislate within constitutional limitations, after all, and it was not plain from the language of the statute that this alternative interpretation was incompatible. Stevens disputed that applying Blakely to the Guidelines would frustrate the goal of achieving uniformity in sentences based on real conduct, because judges retained discretion to impose sentences within prescribed ranges; if defendants pleaded guilty and waived their Blakely rights, the range within which the judge could exercise his discretion would necessarily increase. Given the fact-based nature of certain sentence enhancements under the Guidelines — drug quantity, firearm enhancements, and extent of injury or loss to the victim — there was no reason juries could not make those determinations. In complicated cases, prosecutors, defense attorneys, and judges together could be trusted to craft workable solutions. To the extent prosecutors overstep their charging authority, judges retain the ability to reject unsatisfactory plea agreements. In light of these objections, Stevens disputed that Congress would have preferred the majority's remedy to a solution of its own devising.

=== Breyer ===
Justice Breyer reiterated his disagreement with the Apprendi rule, and then identified specific reasons not to apply the Blakely holding to the Federal Sentencing Guidelines. The facts used to determine a defendant's sentence had historically been solely within a judge's purview, and the Federal Sentencing Guidelines should be treated no differently. Creating a system that frustrated the goal of increased sentencing uniformity hardly seemed fair to defendants or to the public at large. The fact that the Guidelines were administrative rules rather than statutes also was significant to Breyer. And to the extent that the Guidelines did not adequately take into account an aggravating or mitigating circumstance, a judge was free to depart from the Guidelines range. Thus, the defendant had every expectation that, despite the Guidelines, he might receive a sentence at or near the statutory maximum rather than at the top end of the Guidelines range.

=== Scalia ===
Justice Scalia took issue with the Court's inferring a "reasonableness" standard of appellate review of sentences from the remainder of a statute from which it had excised the express statement that sentences should be reviewed for "reasonableness." Traditionally, sentencing discretion was not reviewable on appeal. When the Guidelines were enacted, appellate review was limited to discrete cases delineated by statute; appellate review was not plenary. According to the text of the statute, the "power to review a sentence for reasonableness arises only when the sentencing court has departed from the applicable guideline range." The situation here was not that the statute did not explicitly set forth a standard of review, but rather that the statute did explicitly set forth such a standard, but then excised from the statute the provision that established the standard. Was it proper for the Court to "look for some congressional 'implication' of a different standard of review in the remnants of the statute that the Court has left standing? Only in Wonderland."

Furthermore, it was not as easy for the courts to apply the "reasonableness" standard in the context of appellate review of sentences as the majority would have liked. First, there was no history of applying that standard under the Guidelines regime. Second, under the majority's holding that standard would apply across the board to all sentence appeals, including those that involved no legal error. "The worst feature of the scheme is that no one knows — and perhaps no one is meant to know — how advisory Guidelines and 'unreasonableness' review will function in practice."

== Resentencing ==
=== Booker ===
The lower courts had to revisit Booker's sentencing in light of the Supreme Court decision. He was resentenced by the same judge to the same 30-year sentence (longer than the 21-year sentence the judge could have imposed if the guidelines not been made advisory); however, retroactive changes in crack cocaine guidelines meant that Booker's sentence has been reduced slightly by a federal judge (from 30 to 27 years). He was released from federal prison on 1 November 2019.

=== Fanfan ===
Fanfan was resentenced by the US District judge from 78 months to 210 months in prison. The new sentence was upheld on appeal by the US Court of Appeals. His sentence was later reduced by the new federal sentencing guidelines for crack cocaine offenses. He was released from federal prison on 12 June 2015.

== Criticism ==
The decision has been criticized for fear that defendants and prosecutors will suffer from greater uncertainty and that some plea agreements will be entered into or rejected because of mistaken beliefs on the sentences that the judge will impose if the case is taken to trial or settled with a guilty plea.

== See also ==
- List of United States Supreme Court cases, volume 543
- List of United States Supreme Court cases
- United States v. Binion (8th Cir. 2005)
