= Sentencing Reform Act =

U.S. federal statute

The Sentencing Reform Act, part of the Comprehensive Crime Control Act of 1984, was a U.S. federal statute intended to increase consistency in United States federal sentencing. It established the United States Sentencing Commission. It also abolished federal parole, except for persons convicted under federal law before November 1, 1987, persons convicted under District of Columbia law, "transfer treaty" inmates, persons who violated military law who are in federal civilian prisons, and persons who are defendants in state cases and who are under the U.S. Marshals Service Witness Protection Program.

The act was passed by large majorities in both houses of Congress.

== See also ==
- Criminal sentencing in the United States
- Imprisonment
