= Shepard v. United States =

- Supreme Court of the United States

Argued November 8, 2004 Decided March 7, 2005
- Full case name: Reginald Shepard, Petitioner v. United States
- Docket no.: 03-9168
- Citations: 544 U.S. 13 (more)
- Argument: Oral argument
- Decision: Opinion

Case history
- Prior: Defendant sentenced. United States v. Shepard, 125 F. Supp. 2d 562 (D. Mass. 2000).; Vacated. United States v. Shepard, 231 F. 3d 56 (1st Cir. 2000).; Cert. denied. 534 U.S. 829 (2001).; Defendant resentenced. United States v. Shepard, 181 F. Supp. 2d. 14 (D. Mass. 2002).; Vacated. United States v. Shepard, 348 F. 3d 308 (1st Cir. 2003).; Cert. granted. 542 U. S. 918 (2004).

Questions presented
- 1. Whether, where the defendant has pleaded guilty to a nongeneric charge of burglary brought under a nongeneric statute, there is no contemporaneous record of the guilty plea proceedings and the judgment of conviction reflects a general finding of guilty, the sentencing court is still bound by Taylor's categorical method of application or may instead be required to conduct an inquiry - including an evidentiary hearing - into the facts underlying the conviction, to determine whether, in the guilty plea proceeding, both the defendant and the government believed that generic burglary was at issue?; 2. If so, whether the sentencing court may be required to consider a version of these underlying facts found in any document in the court file such as an investigative police report or a complaint application and, if the facts alleged in the document are not challenged by the defendant, regard them as sufficiently reliable evidence that the defendant was convicted of a crime including all of the elements of generic burglary to support an Armed Career Criminal Act enhancement?

Holding
- The judgment is reversed, and the case is remanded.

Court membership
- Chief Justice William Rehnquist Associate Justices John P. Stevens · Sandra Day O'Connor; Antonin Scalia · Anthony Kennedy; David Souter · Clarence Thomas; Ruth Bader Ginsburg · Stephen Breyer

Case opinions
- Majority: Souter (except as to Part III), joined by Stevens, Scalia, Ginsburg; Thomas (except as to Part III)
- Plurality: Souter, joined by Stevens, Scalia, Ginsburg (Part III)
- Concurrence: Thomas (in part and in judgment)
- Dissent: O'Connor, joined by Kennedy, Breyer
- Chief Justice Rehnquist took no part in the consideration or decision of the case.

Laws applied
- Armed Career Criminal Act

Shepard v. United States, 544 U.S. 13 (2005), was a United States Supreme Court case relating to the Armed Career Criminal Act.

== Background ==
Federal law prohibits the possession of firearms by certain groups of people, including felons. Prior to an amendment in 2022, violations of this prohibition were generally punishable by up to 10 years in prison. However, the Armed Career Criminal Act (ACCA) requires a mandatory 15-year minimum prison sentence for violations committed by felons with "three previous convictions ... for a violent felony ... committed on occasions different from one another." The term "violent felony" includes any crime that "is burglary."

In Taylor v. United States, the Supreme Court outlined an approach for determining whether a state-law burglary conviction was categorically a conviction for "burglary" under ACCA. The generic offense of ACCA "burglary" requires, Taylor held, "unlawful and unprivileged entry into or remaining in, a building or structure, with intent to commit a crime." Taylor authorized the consideration of statutory elements, charging instruments, and jury ichinstructions to determine whether the prior state burglary conviction was categorically a "violent crime" under ACCA.

== Lower court history ==
On August 12, 1998, Reginald Shepard was indicted in the United States District Court for the District of Massachusetts for violating 18 U.S.C. § 922(g)(1), the federal felon-in-possession statute, after he sold a Glock 17 handgun to an undercover agent of the Bureau of Alcohol, Tobacco, Firearms, and Explosives in October 1995. On March 3, 1999, Shepard pled guilty to the sole count of the indictment.

At sentencing, the government sought an enhanced sentence under ACCA on account of Shepard's previous convictions in Massachusetts state court for burglary which, in Massachusetts, is an offense defined more broadly than the generic form of burglary recognized in Taylor. In each prior case, Shepard had pled guilty rather than go to trial. In the absence of jury instructions, the government sought to admit police reports submitted in support of the charging documents in Shepard's prior cases. However, the district judge declined to consider such evidence, concluding that Taylor precluded the court from doing so. As a result, Shepard's Sentencing Guidelines range decreased from 188–235 months to 30–37 months. After making an upward departure, the district court sentenced Shepard to 46 months' imprisonment.

The government appealed the sentencing decision to the United States Court of Appeals for the First Circuit. On appeal, the First Circuit vacated Shepard's sentence and remanded the case back to the district court for resentencing. Citing prior precedent, the First Circuit held that the police reports were not a categorically impermissible source of evidence to consult at sentencing in light of Taylor. The district court, the Court of Appeals held, did not properly analyze whether such documents were a sufficiently reliable source of evidence, and remanded the case with instructions to conduct the reliability analysis. Shepard sought review in the Supreme Court, which was denied on October 1, 2001.

On remand, the government submitted additional complaint applications outlining more of Shepard's prior convictions. In response, Shepard submitted an affidavit to the effect that the police reports had not been read to him at the time of his guilty pleas, that he was not asked about whether the information contained within the reports was accurate, that he did not then admit as much, and that he had never since then admitted as much. At resentencing, the district court again sentenced Shepard to a non-ACCA (albeit slightly above-guidelines) sentence of 46 months' imprisonment. The district courted noted that, in the absence of transcripts, the only account of what transpired at Shepard's prior plea hearings had been provided by Shepard himself, who stated that he had never confirmed any of the information contained within the police reports. Having found that the government failed to meet its burden of demonstrating three prior convictions for generic burglary, the court reimposed its prior sentence of 46 months.

Again on appeal, the First Circuit vacated the district court's resentencing judgment. Reasoning that Shepard had never "seriously disputed" that he burglarized the buildings described in the police reports and complaint applications, the Court of Appeals determined that the District Court had erred in concluding that the government had not carried its burden of demonstrating three prior convictions for generic burglary.

== Supreme Court ==
On February 23, 2004, Shepard petitioned the Supreme Court for a writ of certiorari. On June 21, 2004, the court granted review. The case was argued on November 8 of that year. Justice John Paul Stevens (then the most senior Associate Justice) presided over oral arguments, on account of Chief Justice Rehnuquist's absence due to ill health. Linda J. Thompson argued the case for Shepard. John P. Elwood argued the case for the United States. On March 7, 2005, the Supreme Court issued its opinions. Chief Justice Rehnquist took no part in the consideration or decision of the case.

=== Majority and plurality opinions ===
Justice Souter announced the judgment of the court reversing the First Circuit. Justices Stevens, Scalia, and Ginsburg joined the opinion in full, with Justice Thomas joining all but Part III. As a result, all but Part III of the opinion was joined by a majority of the court, leaving Part III with a plurality of only four justices signing on.

The majority opinion held that under ACCA, the enquiry into whether a prior pled conviction is categorically a "violent felony" is limited to the charging document, the terms of the plea agreement, and the transcript of the plea colloquy between the sentencing judge and the defendant. The majority reasoned that absent statutory text in ACCA purporting to treat convictions following a trial differently from those following a guilty plea, and given the focus in Taylor on the elements of an offense rather than the defendant's conduct underlying it, courts applying ACCA may therefore only consult those sources that establish what elements the defendant necessarily admitted. Police reports, the majority held by contrast, may establish the conduct underlying the charges but do not establish what elements the defendant necessarily admitted by his plea.

In Part III of his opinion, Justice Souter argued that the Armed Career Criminal Act would be at risk of unconstitutionality if judges were permitted to inquire too deeply about the conduct underlying a defendant's prior offense. In distinguishing the case from Almendarez-Torres v. United States, Justice Souter remarked:

While the disputed fact here can be described as a fact about a prior conviction, it is too far removed from the conclusive significance of a prior judicial record, and too much like the findings subject to Jones and Apprendi, to say that Almendarez-Torres clearly authorizes a judge to resolve the dispute.

— Shepard, 544 U.S., at 25 (plurality opinion).

=== Concurring opinion ===
Justice Thomas authored an opinion concurring in part and concurring in the judgment. In his opinion, Justice Thomas criticizes the court's prior holdings in Taylor and Almendarez-Torres. Having previously expressed disagreement in Apprendi regarding his dispositive vote in Almendarez-Torres, Justice Thomas argues that Taylor allows judges to make a constitutionally indistinguishable finding regarding whether a defendant's prior felony conviction is an ACCA predicate offense. Parting with the plurality, Thomas argued that:

... broadening the evidence judges may consider when finding facts under Taylor—by permitting sentencing courts to look beyond charging papers, jury instructions, and plea agreements to an assortment of other documents such as complaint applications and police reports—would not give rise to constitutional doubt, as the plurality believes ... It would give rise to constitutional error, no less than does the limited factfinding that Taylor’s rule permits.

— Shepard, 544 U.S., at 28 (opinion of Thomas, J.).

=== Dissenting opinion ===
Justice O'Connor authored a dissenting opinion in which Justices Kennedy and Breyer joined. The dissent criticized the majority's holding to the extent that it required courts to blind themselves to "clearly knowable facts," and that doing so frustrated ACCA's premise of incarcerating recalcitrant offenders in a consistent manner. Enhanced sentences under ACCA, Justice O'Connor argued, should not turn on the happenstance of state record keeping and plea practices. The dissent also rejected concerns from the plurality and Justice Thomas regarding constitutional infirmity that might follow from extending the scope of the enquiry required by ACCA.
