= Taylor v. United States =

Taylor v. United States may refer to several United States Supreme Court cases:

- Taylor v. United States, 44 U.S. 197 (1832).
- Taylor v. United States, 207 U.S. 120 (1907).
- Taylor v. United States, 286 U.S. 1 (1932).
- Richard Taylor v. United States, 414 U.S. 17 (1973).
- Arthur Taylor v. United States, 495 U.S. 575 (1990), on the Armed Career Criminal Act.
- David Taylor v. United States, 579 U.S. 301 (2016), on the Hobbs Act.
