= Sessions v. Dimaya =

Sessions v. Dimaya Lynch v. Dimaya
- Supreme Court of the United States

Argued January 17, 2017 Reargued October 2, 2017 Decided April 17, 2018
- Full case name: Jefferson B. Sessions, III, Attorney General, Petitioner v. James Garcia Dimaya, Loretta E. Lynch v. James Garcia Dimaya
- Docket no.: 15-1498
- Citations: 584 U.S. 148 (more) 138 S. Ct. 1204; 200 L. Ed. 2d 549; 2018 U.S. LEXIS 2497
- Argument: Oral argument
- Reargument: Reargument
- Opinion announcement: Opinion announcement

Case history
- Prior: Board of Immigration Appeals reversed sub nom., Dimaya v. Lynch, 803 F.3d 1110 (9th Cir. 2015); cert. granted sub. nom., Lynch v. Dimaya, 137 S. Ct. 31 (2016).

Holding
- 18 U.S.C. § 16(b), a statute defining certain "aggravated felonies", is unconstitutionally vague.

Court membership
- Chief Justice John Roberts Associate Justices Anthony Kennedy · Clarence Thomas; Ruth Bader Ginsburg · Stephen Breyer; Samuel Alito · Sonia Sotomayor; Elena Kagan · Neil Gorsuch

Case opinions
- Majority: Kagan, joined by Ginsburg, Breyer, Sotomayor, Gorsuch (Parts I, III, IV–B, and V); Ginsburg, Breyer, Sotomayor (Parts II and IV–A)
- Concurrence: Gorsuch (in part)
- Dissent: Roberts, joined by Kennedy, Thomas, Alito
- Dissent: Thomas, joined by Kennedy, Alito (Parts I–C–2, II–A–1, and II–B)

Laws applied
- U.S. Const. amend. V 18 U.S.C. § 16(b)

Sessions v. Dimaya, 584 U.S. 148 (2018), was a United States Supreme Court case in which the Court held that 18 U.S.C. § 16(b), a statute defining certain "aggravated felonies" for immigration purposes, is unconstitutionally vague. The Immigration and Nationality Act (INA) classifies some categories of crimes as "aggravated felonies", and immigrants convicted of those crimes, including those legally present in the United States, are almost certain to be deported. Those categories include "crimes of violence", which are defined by the "elements clause" and the "residual clause". The Court struck down the "residual clause", which classified every felony that, "by its nature, involves a substantial risk" of "physical force against the person or property" as an aggravated felony.

== Background ==
James Dimaya was a native of the Philippines who legally immigrated to the United States in 1992. He was convicted on two separate counts of residential burglary in 2007 and 2009. Due to these convictions, the United States government sought to deport Dimaya in 2010, asserting that these convictions were "aggravated felonies" under the Immigration and Nationality Act to support his deportation. Specifically, the government argued that Dimaya's convictions fell within the "residual clause" of the definition of a violent crime, which included "any other offense that is a felony and that, by its nature, involves a substantial risk that physical force against the person or property of another may be used in the course of committing the offense." A federal immigration judge ordered Dimaya deported, agreeing that the convictions constituted violent aggravated felonies. The Board of Immigration Appeals upheld the immigration judge's ruling on appeal.

Oral arguments in the Ninth Circuit Court of Appeals.

Dimaya's lawyers appealed the Board's decision to the United States Court of Appeals for the Ninth Circuit. While the Ninth Circuit was hearing this case, the Supreme Court of the United States ruled in Johnson v. United States (2015) that a residual clause in the definition of a violent crime in the Armed Career Criminal Act, which stated "otherwise involves conduct that presents a serious potential risk of physical injury to another", was unconstitutionally vague and violated due process. The Ninth Circuit considered the Supreme Court's rationale in Johnson, and subsequently found that the residual clause in the Immigration and Nationality Act was also unconstitutionally vague, overturning the Board of Immigration Appeals's decision. The October 2015 decision by Circuit Judge Stephen Reinhardt was joined by Judge Kim McLane Wardlaw, over the dissent of Judge Consuelo Callahan.

== Supreme Court ==
Initial oral arguments
In the initial oral arguments, the case was heard as Lynch v. Dimaya.

Rehearing of oral arguments
Oral arguments were re-heard following the appointment of Justice Gorsuch, to break the deadlock.

The United States Government filed a petition for a writ of certiorari to the Supreme Court in June 2016, on the question presented: "Whether 18 U.S.C. 16(b), as incorporated into the Immigration and Nationality Act's provisions governing an alien's removal from the United States, is unconstitutionally vague." In September, the Court granted certiorari, agreeing to hear the case.

The case was first heard on January 17, 2017; the Court at that time only had eight members following the death of Justice Antonin Scalia and prior to confirmation of Justice Neil Gorsuch. The Justices were deadlocked 4 to 4 in their decision, and a new oral hearing was held on October 2, 2017, before the full nine-member court.

=== Opinion of the Court ===
The Court announced judgment in favor of Dimaya on April 17, 2018, affirming the Ninth Circuit by a vote of 5-4. The Court held that the residual clause in the Immigration and Nationality Act was unconstitutionally vague. Justice Elena Kagan wrote the majority decision and was joined by Justices Ruth Bader Ginsburg, Stephen G. Breyer and Sonia Sotomayor, and in part by Neil Gorsuch. Kagan referred to Scalia's majority opinion from Johnson to justify that the language of the residual clause was sufficiently vague. Justice Gorsuch wrote an additional concurring opinion, reiterating the importance of the vagueness doctrine within Scalia's opinion from Johnson.

Commentators widely discussed Justice Gorsuch's decisive vote joining the four liberal justices on the Supreme Court. Gorsuch, who was appointed by President Trump and began serving in April 2017, broke a 4–4 tie in favor of the liberal justices on the Supreme Court, ruling against the Trump administration's position in upholding the existing law. Several news organizations noted that Gorsuch's vote mirrored Scalia's displeasure with vague laws or excessive government power.

This was the first time that Ginsburg was able to assign the majority opinion in her tenure on the Court, since she was the most senior justice voting in the majority.

=== Dissents ===
Chief Justice John Roberts wrote a dissenting opinion, joined by Justices Anthony Kennedy, Clarence Thomas, and Samuel Alito. Roberts argued that the language in the residual clauses of the Immigration and Nationality Act and the Armed Career Criminal Act was significantly different and that the vagueness doctrine did not apply to the Immigration and Nationality Act. Thomas also wrote an additional dissenting opinion, joined in part by Kennedy and Alito.

== Subsequent developments ==
The question of the vagueness of "crime of violence" arose again in the 2019 case Davis v. United States. In this case, two men were arrested and convicted of several charges under the Hobbs Act, which had similar language that required longer mandatory minimum sentences for "crimes of violence", with a similar residual clause to define this. In this case, the residual clauses were triggered by the men brandishing but not using or firing shotguns during the crime. Both challenged this longer sentence. Their case at the Fifth Circuit ruled against their claims that the "crimes of violence" residual clause was vague and thus unconstitutional, but this was prior to the Sessions ruling. On review following the Supreme Court's decision in Sessions, the Fifth Circuit agreed with the claim that the residual clause was vague and unconstitutional, a decision upheld when the case was brought to the Supreme Court.

== See also ==
- Johnson v. United States (2015)
- Stokeling v. United States (2018)
- Vagueness doctrine
- List of United States Supreme Court cases, volume 584
