= Shular v. United States =

- Supreme Court of the United States

Argued January 21, 2020 Decided February 26, 2020
- Full case name: Eddie Lee Shular v. United States
- Docket no.: 18-6662
- Citations: 589 U.S. 154 (more) 140 S. Ct. 779
- Argument: Oral argument
- Decision: Opinion

Case history
- Prior: United States v. Shular, 736 F. App'x 876 (11th Cir. 2018); cert. granted, 139 S. Ct. 2773 (2019).

Holding
- The definition of "serious drug offense" in the Armed Career Criminal Act (18 U.S.C. § 924(e)(2)(A)(ii)) requires only that the state statute involve conduct specified in the federal statute; it does not require that the state offense match a generic offense crafted by a federal court.

Court membership
- Chief Justice John Roberts Associate Justices Clarence Thomas · Ruth Bader Ginsburg; Stephen Breyer · Samuel Alito; Sonia Sotomayor · Elena Kagan; Neil Gorsuch · Brett Kavanaugh

Case opinions
- Majority: Ginsburg, joined by unanimous
- Concurrence: Kavanaugh

Laws applied
- Armed Career Criminal Act of 1984

Shular v. United States, 589 U.S. 154 (2020), is an opinion of the United States Supreme Court in which the Court held that, under the Armed Career Criminal Act of 1984, the definition of “serious drug offense” only requires that the state offense involve the conduct specified in the statute. Unlike other provisions of the ACCA, it does not require that state courts develop “generic” version of a crime, which describe the elements of the offense as they are commonly understood, and then compare the crime being charged to that generic version to determine whether the crime qualifies under the ACCA for purposes of penalty enhancement. The decision states that offenses defined under the ACCA are "unlikely names for generic offenses," and are therefore unambiguous. This renders the rule of lenity inapplicable.

== Background ==
=== Legal history ===
The Armed Career Criminal Act (ACCA) is a federal sentencing law passed in 1984 and later amended in 1986. One section of the ACCA, §924(e)(2)(A)(ii), imposes a mandatory 15-year sentence on defendants convicted of firearms-related felonies if they have three or more prior convictions for "serious drug offenses" or "violent felonies".

The definition of what constituted a "serious drug offense" under the ACCA is quite broad. After it was amended in 1986 (Career Criminals Amendment Act of 1986), the definition of "serious drug offense" was expanded to include acts that are illegal under the federal Controlled Substances Act of 1970, as well as state-level offenses which involve the manufacturing, distribution, or possession with intent to distribute or manufacture controlled substances. As a result of the latter provision, the definition of "serious drug offenses" is significantly impacted by the diversity of state law.

Other definitions of crimes used in the Armed Career Criminal Act are analyzed using what is known as a "categorical approach". In this approach, a court that is sentencing a defendant under the ACCA must first develop a generic definition of a crime, then compare that generic definition of the crime to the specific provisions of the state law to determine whether or not that crime counts towards the three or more previous offenses for that defendant. The Supreme Court requires that the "categorical approach" be used for determining whether a defendant's previous state convictions count as "violent felonies" under the ACCA. However, there was a dispute as to whether the "categorical approach" must also be used for determining whether a previous conviction counted as a "serious drug offense".

=== Case background ===
In 2017, Jefferson County Sheriffs raided the home of Eddie Shular, a Florida man who was the target of a cocaine trafficking investigation by the Drug Enforcement Administration (DEA). During the raid, officers located a .32 caliber revolver in Shular's master bedroom closet. Shular was indicted by a federal grand jury and, in September 2017, he pled guilty in federal court to felonious possession of a firearm.

Under federal law, this offense would normally carry a sentence of up to 10 years in prison. However, because he had more than three convictions for serious drug offenses (specifically, a 2012 conviction on 5 counts of possessing cocaine and 1 count of possessing cocaine with the intent to distribute), he received a mandatory minimum sentence of 15 years in prison. Shular then appealed his sentence.

== In lower courts ==
Because Shular was prosecuted in a Florida federal court, his appeal was initially heard by the United States Court of Appeals for the Eleventh Circuit, presided over by a three-judge panel, composed of Judges Stanley Marcus, Charles Wilson, and Frank M. Hull. In his appeal, Shular argued that the sentencing judge should not have counted his six prior cocaine-related convictions as prior "serious drug offenses", and accordingly should not have sentenced him to the mandatory minimum sentence of 15 years. Shular's argument was that Congress intended for "serious drug offenses" to include only drug offenses with a mens rea element (e.g. that the statute requires that the government prove that the defendant knew that he was selling a controlled substance). Shular noted that the Florida statute did not require the government to prove he knew that he was selling a controlled substance (cocaine) which meant that his convictions under that statute were not valid under the ACCA. In other words, he argued that the court should apply the "categorical approach"—comparing the elements of Florida's drug law to a generic federal drug law (one with a mens rea requirement) in order to determine whether any convictions under that Florida law should count towards the '3 strikes' of the ACCA.

Shular acknowledged that his suggested approach contradicted the Eleventh Circuit's precedent in United States v. Smith (2014), and called on the court to overturn their precedent. In a per curiam opinion released in September 2018, the Eleventh Circuit upheld Shuler's sentence. In their opinion, the court noted that the Eleventh Circuit adheres to a strong "prior panel precedent" rule, which means that a prior Eleventh Circuit panel's opinion is binding on all future panels unless it is overturned by the United States Supreme Court or an en banc panel consisting of the entire Eleventh Circuit.

Shular appealed the Eleventh Circuit's opinion to the Supreme Court, which granted his writ of certiorari agreeing to hear the case in June 2019. Oral arguments were held on January 21, 2020. Richard Summa, an Assistant Federal Defender from the Northern District of Florida, argued the case on behalf of Shular. Jonathan Bond, an Assistant US Solicitor General, argued the case on behalf of the United States Government.

== Supreme Court opinion ==
=== Majority opinion ===
On February 26, 2020, the Supreme Court released an opinion affirming the decision by the Eleventh Circuit and ruling against Shular. Writing for a unanimous court, Justice Ruth Bader Ginsburg noted that, unlike in the other provisions referenced by Shular, that involve the categorical approach, the provision in question relating to "serious drug offenses" used the term 'involving'—which should be interpreted to mean that "serious drug offenses" includes any crime that 'involves' the enumerated acts (distribution, manufacturing, and possession of drugs). The opinion also noted that the rule of lenity, which would ordinarily require the court to interpret ambiguous phrases in a law in the manner most favorable to the defendant, was not applicable here since the terms being used were not genuinely ambiguous.

=== Concurrence ===
Justice Brett Kavanaugh wrote a concurring opinion, which noted that he joined the majority opinion in full. He further elaborated about how the rule of lenity did not apply to Shular. Kavanaugh describes the process for when the rule of lenity should be used:

1. Courts must first attempt traditional methods of statutory interpretation and, if that fails

2. they may only resort to the rule of lenity when the terms being used are so grievously ambiguous that the court can only guess at what the legislature intended

=== Effect ===
The Supreme Court's ruling resolved a circuit split on the use of the categorical approach to analyzing state "serious drug offenses" under the Armed Career Criminal Act.
