= Johnson v. United States (2015) =

- Supreme Court of the United States

Argued November 5, 2014 Reargued April 20, 2015 Decided June 26, 2015
- Full case name: Samuel James Johnson, Petitioner v. United States
- Docket no.: 13-7120
- Citations: 576 U.S. 591 (more) 135 S. Ct. 2551; 192 L. Ed. 2d 569
- Argument: Oral argument
- Opinion announcement: Opinion announcement

Case history
- Prior: United States v. Johnson, 526 F. App'x 708 (8th Cir. 2013); cert. granted, 572 U.S. 1059 (2014).

Holding
- The Residual Clause of the Armed Career Criminal Act is unconstitutionally vague and as a result one's due process rights are violated.

Court membership
- Chief Justice John Roberts Associate Justices Antonin Scalia · Anthony Kennedy; Clarence Thomas · Ruth Bader Ginsburg; Stephen Breyer · Samuel Alito; Sonia Sotomayor · Elena Kagan

Case opinions
- Majority: Scalia, joined by Roberts, Ginsburg, Breyer, Sotomayor, Kagan
- Concurrence: Kennedy (in judgment)
- Concurrence: Thomas (in judgment)
- Dissent: Alito

Laws applied
- Armed Career Criminal Act 18 U.S.C. § 924(e)(1), U.S. Const. amend. V
- This case overturned a previous ruling or rulings
- James v. United States (2007) (in part) & Sykes v. United States (2011) (in part)

Johnson v. United States, 576 U.S. 591 (2015), was a United States Supreme Court case in which the Court ruled the Residual Clause of the Armed Career Criminal Act was unconstitutionally vague and in violation of due process.

== Background ==
=== Armed Career Criminal Act ===
The Armed Career Criminal Act (ACCA) was a part of the Comprehensive Crime Control Act of 1984 that was enacted to impose tougher sentences in illegal firearms cases on defendants who have previously been convicted three or more times for "violent" felonies. 18 U.S.C. § 924(e)(2)(B) defined a "violent felony" as an act that threatens "use of physical force against the person of another," "is burglary, arson, or extortion," "involves use of explosives," or "otherwise involves conduct that presents a serious potential risk of physical injury to another." The last part of this definition became known as the "residual clause".

=== Case History ===
Samuel James Johnson was a lifelong criminal and active white supremacist who, starting in 2010, was monitored by the FBI due to his involvement in suspected terrorist groups. Over the years, he revealed to undercover agents his plans to carry out terrorist attacks, as well as his illegal supply of weapons. In 2012, he was indicted on multiple counts of being a felon in possession of firearms and ammunition. Johnson pleaded guilty to the weapons charges and was sentenced under the ACCA's residual clause to a statutory minimum of 15 years for having three prior "violent felony" convictions, one of which was possession of a sawed-off shotgun.

=== Arguments ===
Initial oral arguments
The Court first considered whether the state law banning possession of a sawed-off shot gun qualified as a "violent felony" under the residual clause.

Reargument five months later
The case was reargued to address the question of whether or not the residual clause was unconstitutionally vague.

Johnson's lawyers argued that mere possession of a sawed-off shotgun does not qualify as a "violent felony" as described under the residual clause. In 2013, an appeal to the Eighth Circuit upheld the decision by the District Court to sentence Johnson to 15 years in accordance to the ACCA. The Supreme Court of the United States originally granted the case certiorari to decide if the state law banning possession of a sawed-off shot gun qualified as a "violent felony" under the residual clause. The case was initially argued on November 5, 2014, but the Court asked the parties to reconvene and directly address the question of whether or not the residual clause was unconstitutionally vague. The case was reargued on April 20, 2015.

== Opinions ==
=== Majority ===
Justice Scalia wrote the opinion of the Court, which determined the residual clause to be in violation of the Fifth Amendment. Scalia described the statute as a "failed enterprise" that invited "arbitrary enforcement." He declared that individuals are unconstitutionally deprived of due process when they are convicted under "a criminal law so vague that it fails to give ordinary people fair notice of the conduct it punishes."

The Court had raised the specter of unconstitutional vagueness in two prior cases regarding the residual clause—James v. United States and Sykes v. United States—that "honed in on the imprecision of the phrase 'serious potential risk'". However, "neither opinion evaluated the uncertainty introduced by the need to evaluate the riskiness of an abstract ordinary case of a crime."

Noting that "[d]ecisions under the residual clause have proved to be anything but evenhanded, predictable, or consistent", the Court decided that "[s]tanding by James and Sykes would undermine, rather than promote, the goals that stare decisis is meant to serve." The Court held that the residual clause was unconstitutionally vague, overruling the contrary holdings in James and Sykes.

=== Concurrences ===
Justices Kennedy and Thomas wrote separate opinions concurring in judgment, but disagreeing that the residual clause of ACCA is unconstitutionally vague.

=== Dissent ===
Justice Alito dissented, arguing that the court could and therefore should interpret the residual clause in a narrower way that meets constitutional standards. He also found the circumstances of Johnson's sawed-off shotgun conviction, it being in his possession during a drug deal in a public parking lot, could have met even a narrow interpretation of the clause.

== Subsequent developments ==
In Welch v. United States, the Supreme Court announced that the decision in Johnson was retroactive.

== See also ==
- Sessions v. Dimaya (2018) - constitutionality of similar clause in civil context (specifically, deportation), in which a plurality found straightforward application of Johnson to be dispositive
- Stokeling v. United States (2019) - touches on the same section of the Armed Career Criminal Act and references this decision often

Previous Supreme Court decisions about the "residual clause" of the Armed Career Criminal Act:

- James v. United States (2007) - overruled in part by Johnson
- Begay v. United States (2008)
- Chambers v. United States (2009)
- Sykes v. United States (2011) - overruled in part by Johnson
