= James v. United States (2007) =

- Supreme Court of the United States

Argued November 7, 2006 Decided April 18, 2007
- Full case name: Alphonso James, Jr., Petitioner v. United States
- Docket no.: 05-9264
- Citations: 550 U.S. 192 (more) 127 S. Ct. 1586; 167 L. Ed. 2d 532; 2007 U.S. LEXIS 4337; 75 U.S.L.W. 4230; 20 Fla. L. Weekly Fed. S 161

Case history
- Prior: Conviction affirmed by the Eleventh Circuit, 430 F.3d 1150 (11th Cir. 2005); cert. granted, 547 U.S. ___ (2006).

Holding
- Attempted burglary is a predicate felony under the federal Armed Career Criminal Act.

Court membership
- Chief Justice John Roberts Associate Justices John P. Stevens · Antonin Scalia; Anthony Kennedy · David Souter; Clarence Thomas · Ruth Bader Ginsburg; Stephen Breyer · Samuel Alito

Case opinions
- Majority: Alito, joined by Roberts, Kennedy, Souter, Breyer
- Dissent: Scalia, joined by Stevens, Ginsburg
- Dissent: Thomas

Laws applied
- 18 U.S.C. § 924(e)(1)
- Overruled by
- Johnson v. United States (2015)

James v. United States, 550 U.S. 192 (2007), is a decision by the Supreme Court of the United States that held that attempted burglary could serve as a predicate felony under the federal Armed Career Criminal Act (ACCA), which provided that a person convicted of being a felon in possession of a firearm with three prior convictions for either serious drug offenses or violent felonies must be sentenced to a mandatory minimum 15-year prison term.

== Background ==
Alphonso James pleaded guilty to one count of being a felon in possession of a firearm and admitted to having three prior felony convictions, including one for attempted burglary of a dwelling under Florida law. The Government argued for the mandatory 15-year sentence available under the Armed Career Criminal Act because the attempted burglary count is a "violent felony" under the ACCA. The district court and the Eleventh Circuit agreed. James asked the U.S. Supreme Court to review the case, and it agreed to do so.

== Majority opinion ==
=== The statutory scheme ===
Under the Armed Career Criminal Act (ACCA),

In the case of a person who [is convicted of being a felon in possession of a firearm] and has three previous convictions by any court... for a violent felony or a serious drug offense, or both, committed on occasions different from one another, such person shall be... imprisoned not less than fifteen years.

A "violent felony" is

any crime punishable by imprisonment for a term exceeding one year, or any act of juvenile delinquency involving the use or carrying of a firearm, knife, or destructive device that would be punishable by imprisonment for such term if committed by an adult, that—

1. has as an element to use, attempted use, or threatened use of physical force against the person of another; or
2. is burglary, arson, or extortion, involves use of explosives, or otherwise involves conduct that presents a serious potential risk of physical injury to another.

At the time of James' crime, Florida law defined "burglary" as "entering or remaining in a structure or a conveyance with the intent to commit an offense therein, unless the premises are at the time open to the public or the defendant is licensed or invited to enter or remain." Florida law also defined an "attempt" as requiring the defendant to commit "any act toward the commission of" the target offense.

The attempted burglary did not qualify under the first prong of the definition of "violent felony", since it did not involve the use of force against any person. And it was not any of the enumerated offenses in the second prong—it was not robbery or extortion, and it did not involve the use of explosives. Attempted burglary did not satisfy the categorical definition of burglary set forth in Taylor v. United States, 495 U.S. 575 (1990), because it did not involve an actual entry into or remaining in a building. (If it did, it would not be attempted burglary; the crime of burglary would be complete.)

The question in this case was therefore very narrow: Was attempted burglary a crime that "otherwise involves conduct that presents a serious potential risk of physical injury to another"?

=== Attempt is not categorically excluded ===
James first argued that no attempt crime could qualify as posing a serious potential risk of injury. Because the first prong of the definition included the word "attempt", if Congress had meant for the catch-all provision in the second prong to include attempts it would have said so expressly. But the Court pointed out that the second prong had a catch-all prong, whereas the first did not, and thus it was necessary to determine which crimes fit inside that catch-all group. An expansive phrasing could not be specific and limited.

James also argued that, by the statutory canon of ejusdem generis, the catch-all phrase should be read to include only completed crimes because the other crimes listed were completed crimes. This was not the case, the Court reasoned, because the category of crimes involving explosives was not limited to completed crimes. "In any event, the most relevant common attribute of the enumerated offenses of burglary, arson, extortion, and explosives is not 'completion'. Rather, it is that all of these offenses, while not technically crimes against the person, nevertheless create significant risks of bodily injury or confrontation that might result in bodily injury". The broad residual provision was meant to sweep up other crimes that, like burglary, arson, extortion, and explosives offenses, posed a serious risk of physical or legal injury to others.

=== Legislative history ===
When Congress was debating in 1984 the bill that became ACCA, it considered expressly including attempt as a predicate offense that would trigger the 15-year sentence. But when it ultimately passed the bill in 1986, Congress had dropped the word "attempt", opting to define "violent felony" as either "robbery or burglary, or both". The Court did not find this history probative, because Congress intended to expand the predicate crimes in its 1986 enactment, using broader language in order to achieve this goal.

=== Attempted burglary under the residual clause ===
The Court next considered the crucial question—whether attempted burglary, as defined by Florida law, involved conduct that presented a serious risk of physical injury to another person. Under the categorical approach of Taylor, the Court could only look to the elements of the crime to answer the question. Although, on the face of Florida's attempt statute, it appeared that "any act toward the commission" of the burglary would render the defendant guilty of attempted burglary, the Florida Supreme Court had narrowed the scope of the statute to require that the defendant take some "overt act directed toward entering or remaining in a structure or conveyance". "The main risk of burglary arises not from the simple physical act of wrongfully entering onto another's property, but rather from the face-to-face confrontation between the burglar and a third party—whether an occupant, a police officer, or a bystander—who comes to investigate. That is, the risk arises not from the completion of the burglary, but from the possibility that an innocent person might appear while the crime is in progress". Viewed from this perspective, the only difference between completed burglary and attempted burglary under Florida law was that, in an attempted burglary, the would-be burglar was caught before entering the building he sought to invade.

To be sure, some attempted burglaries might not pose a realistic risk of confrontation to anyone, as when the target of the attempted burglary was an unoccupied building. But the definition of "violent felony" in ACCA was couched in terms of probabilities, and those probabilities had to be measured against the probability of harm entailed in a completed burglary, because that crime was explicitly included in the definition of "violent felony". And in any event, the categorical approach of Taylor does not require that every conceivable factual pattern covered by a statute must present a serious risk of physical injury before the offense is a "violent felony". It is enough that the conduct described by the elements of the offense would, in the ordinary case, present a serious risk of injury.

== Dissenting opinions ==
=== Justice Scalia's dissent ===
Justice Scalia, joined by Justice Stevens and Justice Ginsburg, faulted the Court's opinion for failing to "provide guidance concrete enough to ensure that the ACCA residual provision will be applied with an acceptable degree of consistency by the hundreds of district judges that impose sentences every day". How should these judges know whether burglary, arson, or extortion is the most analogous to the crime of which the defendant had been previously convicted? What if none of these three were most analogous, as would be the case for a prior conviction for driving under the influence? Such vagueness could not be tolerated, Scalia argued.

Scalia argued that a better way to determine whether a prior conviction qualified as a "crime of violence" under the residual provision would be to see whether it posed at least as much risk of injury as the enumerated crime that posed the least such risk. That crime could not be arson or the explosives crime, and so Scalia was left with burglary or extortion. In Taylor the Court ruled that "burglary" in the ACCA's definition of "violent felony" had a generic meaning—unlawful or unprivileged entry into or remaining in a building or structure with the intent to commit a crime. Scalia posited a generic definition of extortion: obtaining something of value from another with his consent induced by the wrongful use or threatened use of force. As between the two, burglary posed less of an inherent risk of harm because it did not, by definition, in its generic sense, involve the use of force. "The burglar may be prepared to flee at the first sign of human presence", after all.

Having concluded that burglary was the least dangerous of the four crimes, Scalia contended that attempted burglary was less risky than completed burglary. By definition, in a completed burglary, the burglar has entered the building, where the closer proximity of prowler and victim increases the likelihood that injury will result from any confrontation between the two. "The so-called 'confrontation' the Court envisions between a would-be burglar and a third party while the burglar is still outside the home is likely to consist of nothing more than the occupant's yelling 'Who's there?' from his window, and the burglar's running away". The danger posed by burglary arises from the fact that the burglar has entered the building, and thus attempted burglary is categorically less dangerous than completed burglary.

=== Justice Thomas's dissent ===
Justice Thomas reiterated his view that the Sixth Amendment required a jury to determine the facts of the prior convictions that supported the ACCA sentence beyond a reasonable doubt.

== Case law ==
Past case law about attempt or impossibility include People v. Lee Kong (Cal., 1892), State v. Mitchell (Mo., 1902) and United States v. Thomas (U.S.C.M.A, 1962).
