= Almendarez-Torres v. United States =

- Supreme Court of the United States

Argued October 14, 1997 Decided March 24, 1998
- Full case name: Hugo Roman Almendarez-Torres, Petitioner v. United States
- Docket no.: 96-6839
- Citations: 523 U.S. 224 (more) 140 L. Ed. 2d 350, 118 S. Ct. 1219, 1998 U.S. LEXIS 2118

Case history
- Prior: Defendant sentenced. United States v. Almendarez-Torres, No. 4:95-cr-124A (N.D. Tex. 1996).; Affirmed, United States v. Almendarez-Torres, 113 F.3d 515 (5th Cir. 1996).; Cert. granted. 520 U.S. 1154 (1997).
- Subsequent: Motion for leave to file a petition for rehearing denied. Almendarez-Torres v. United States, 530 U.S. 1299 (2000).

Questions presented
- Does a sentencing court violate due process by determining Title 8 U.S.C. § 1326(b)(2) is not a separate offense from Title 8 U.S.C. 1326, but merely a sentencing enhancement?

Holding
- Subsection (b)(2) is a penalty provision, which simply authorizes an enhanced sentence. Since it does not create a separate crime, the Government is not required to charge the fact of an earlier conviction in the indictment.

Court membership
- Chief Justice William Rehnquist Associate Justices John P. Stevens · Sandra Day O'Connor; Antonin Scalia · Anthony Kennedy; David Souter · Clarence Thomas; Ruth Bader Ginsburg · Stephen Breyer

Case opinions
- Majority: Breyer, joined by Rehnquist, O'Connor, Kennedy, Thomas
- Dissent: Scalia, joined by Stevens, Souter, Ginsburg

Laws applied
- 8 U.S.C. § 1326; U.S. Const. amend. VI

Almendarez-Torres v. United States, 523 U.S. 224 (1998), was a United States Supreme Court case.

== Background ==
Federal immigration law prohibits the reentry into the United States of previously removed aliens. Subsection (a) of 8 U.S.C. § 1326 provides:

Subject to subsection (b), any alien who—

(1) has been ... deported ... and thereafter
(2) enters ... or is at any time found in, the United States [without the Attorney General’s consent or the legal equivalent] shall be fined under title 18, or imprisoned not more than 2 years, or both.

Subsection (b) of § 1326 provides:

Notwithstanding subsection (a), in the case of any alien described in such subsection—

(1) whose removal was subsequent to a conviction for commission of three or more misdemeanors involving drugs, crimes against the person, or both, or a felony (other than an aggravated felony), such alien shall be fined under title 18, imprisoned not more than 10 years, or both;
(2) whose removal was subsequent to a conviction for commission of an aggravated felony, such alien shall be fined under such title, imprisoned not more than 20 years, or both[.]

== Lower court history ==
On September 12, 1995, Hugo Roman Almendarez-Torres was indicted in the United States District Court for the Northern District of Texas. Almendarez-Torres, a Mexican national, had previously been arrested and deported from the United States on or about April 18, 1992. However, he unlawfully reentered the United States in June 1992, and was subsequently found in the United States on July 28, 1995. The indictment charged Almendarez-Torres with a single count of "violation of Title 8, United States Code, Section 1326." Almendarez-Torres would later go on to plead guilty to the sole count of the indictment.

Almendarez-Torres was sentenced in March 1996. At the sentencing hearing, defense counsel pointed out that, under Hamling v. United States, an indictment must identify each and every element of a charged offense. Counsel argued that because the indictment had not alleged any facts about Almendarez-Torres's prior criminal history of aggravated felonies, the court could therefore not sentence him to more than two years' imprisonment, pursuant to 8 U.S.C. § 1326(a). The District Court disagreed and sentenced Almendarez-Torres to 85 months' imprisonment. On appeal, the United States Court of Appeals for the Fifth Circuit affirmed, citing its prior decision in United States v. Vasquez-Olvera, on August 22, 1996.

== Supreme Court ==
On November 20, 1996, Almendarez-Torres petitioned the Supreme Court for a writ of certiorari. On March 31, 1997, the Supreme Court granted review. Oral arguments were heard on October 14, 1997. Peter Fleury argued the case for Almendarez-Torres. Beth Brinkmann argued the case for the United States. On March 24, 1998, the Supreme Court issued its opinions.

=== Majority opinion ===
Justice Breyer authored the opinion of the court, in which Chief Justice Rehnquist and Justices O'Connor, Kennedy, and Thomas joined, affirming the Fifth Circuit. The majority held that the provision under which Almendarez-Torres was sentenced, § 1326(b)(2), was a penalty provision authorizing an enhanced sentence, rather than a different crime altogether from § 1326(a). Under Hamling, the majority reasoned, an indictment must allege each fact necessary to prove the defendant's guilt, but need not allege factors relevant only to the sentencing of a guilty offender. After examining the statute's legislative history, the majority concluded that § 1326(b)(2) was such a sentencing provision, and that Congress did not intend to treat recidivism as an element of a standalone offense, and that such findings could therefore be made by a judge rather than necessarily by a jury. The majority then rejected Almendarez-Torres's claim that the Constitution requires courts to construe recidivism as an element of the offense notwithstanding congressional intent to the contrary. Finally, the Court withheld judgment on whether such sentencing determinations may be made by the judge by a preponderance of the evidence, as opposed to a more exacting standard of proof.

=== Dissenting opinion ===
Justice Scalia authored a dissenting opinion, in which Justices Stevens, Souter, and Ginsburg joined. The dissent argued that the most natural reading of § 1326(b) was that it created aggravated offenses, not mere sentencing enhancements, and that the magnitude of the punishment increase strongly supports treating the prior conviction as an element. Justice Scalia also suggested that, at an absolute minimum, serious constitutional doubt requires the element construction. Justice Scalia contended that the Court's precedents made it at least seriously questionable whether Congress could lawfully authorize 2 years based on the jury verdict but 20 years based on an additional fact found only by the judge. If, Justice Scalia argued, § 1326 is reasonably susceptible to the alternative construction (under which that fact is an element) the constitutional-avoidance canon says the Court should adopt it. Thus, Justice Scalia argued that there was no need to decide whether the Constitution actually requires that result.

== Subsequent developments ==
Almendarez-Torres has never formally been overturned by the Supreme Court, and lower courts remain bound by its holding. However, the Court has repeatedly described it as exceptional, declined to extend it, and narrowed its scope. In the decades to follow, Justice Clarence Thomas would urge the Court to correct the “error to which [he] succumbed” by joining the decision.

In Jones v. United States (1999), the Court noted that adopting the government's interpretation of the federal carjacking statute would "raise a serious constitutional question" under the Fifth and Sixth Amendments: "when a jury determination has not been waived, may judicial factfinding by a preponderance support the application of a provision that increases the potential severity of the penalty for a variant of a given crime?"

In Apprendi v. New Jersey, the Court held that other than the fact of a prior conviction, any fact increasing the penalty beyond the statutory maximum must be submitted to a jury and proved beyond a reasonable doubt.

In Blakely v. Washington, the Court held that that the Sixth Amendment right to a jury trial prohibits judges from enhancing criminal sentences based on facts not decided by a jury or admitted by the defendant. In United States v. Booker, the Court would extend its holding in Blakely and Apprendi to the federal sentencing guidelines.

In Shepard v. United States, Justice Souter's plurality opinion expressly identified Sixth Amendment concerns with allowing a judge to determine facts about the defendant's underlying conduct. Justice Thomas was more explicit: Almendarez-Torres, he wrote, had been eroded by subsequent Sixth Amendment jurisprudence and urged its reconsideration.

In Descamps v. United States and Mathis v. United States, the Court emphasized that the Armed Career Criminal Act generally requires courts to determine the elements of the offense of conviction, rather than reconstruct what the defendant actually did. Although Descamps and Mathis involved statutory (rather than constitutional) interpretation, the Court repeatedly invoked the Sixth Amendment problem that would arise if sentencing judges conducted mini-trials about old criminal conduct.

In Alleyne v. United States, the Court described Almendarez-Torres as a "narrow exception" to the "general rule" that facts increasing a defendant's sentence beyond the statutory maximum penalty are "elements" of a crime that must either be admitted by the defendant, or charged in the indictment and proven to the jury beyond a reasonable doubt.

In Erlinger v. United States, the Court summarized its holding in Almendarez-Torres as one that, quoting Alleyne, "persists as a 'narrow exception' permitting judges to find only 'the fact of a prior conviction.'"

== See also ==
- List of United States Supreme Court cases, volume 523
- List of United States Supreme Court cases
- Lists of United States Supreme Court cases by volume
