= Stokeling v. United States =

2019 United States Supreme Court opinion

- Supreme Court of the United States

Argued October 9, 2018 Decided January 15, 2019
- Full case name: Denard Stokeling v. United States
- Docket no.: 17-5554
- Citations: 586 U.S. 73 (more) 139 S. Ct. 544; 202 L. Ed. 2d 512

Case history
- Prior: United States v. Stokeling, 684 F. App'x 870 (11th Cir. 2017), cert. granted, 138 S. Ct. 1438 (2018).

Holding
- A state robbery offense that includes as an element the common law requirement of overcoming "victim resistance" is categorically a "violent felony" under the definition of the term under the Armed Career Criminal Act of 1984, even when only 'slight force' is required to meet the elements of the crime.

Court membership
- Chief Justice John Roberts Associate Justices Clarence Thomas · Ruth Bader Ginsburg; Stephen Breyer · Samuel Alito; Sonia Sotomayor · Elena Kagan; Neil Gorsuch · Brett Kavanaugh

Case opinions
- Majority: Thomas, joined by Breyer, Alito, Gorsuch, Kavanaugh
- Dissent: Sotomayor, joined by Roberts, Ginsburg, Kagan

Laws applied
- Armed Career Criminal Act of 1984

Stokeling v. United States, 586 U.S. ___ (2019), was a United States Supreme Court case in which the court held that state robbery offenses that involve overcoming victim resistance count as "violent felonies" under the definition of that term under the Armed Career Criminal Act of 1984, even when only 'slight force' is required. Under the Armed Career Criminal Act, defendants with three or more violent felonies can face higher sentences when subsequently convicted of a federal firearms-related offense. This case upheld a ruling by the 11th Circuit.

This case was notable because it was the first Supreme Court case heard by Brett Kavanaugh following his appointment to the Supreme Court, and because of the 'unusual' distribution of votes, with Stephen Breyer siding with the more conservative wing of the Court to uphold the 11th circuit's ruling.

== Background ==
The Armed Career Criminal Act (ACCA), a federal law passed in 1984, requires a mandatory 15-year sentence to firearms defendants convicted of three or more violent felonies. The definition of what constituted a violent felony is broad and largely reflects the diversity of state law. The Supreme Court has held that, for the purpose of defining whether or not a state robbery offense constitutes a 'violent felony' under the ACCA definition, courts must apply a 'categorical' rule: do the elements of the robbery offense, as defined in the state's robbery statute, meet the requirements of violence under the ACCA?

In 2015, Florida man Denard Stokeling, who had 3 previous convictions for home invasion, kidnapping, and robbery, was arrested during the investigation of a robbery at a Miami Beach restaurant. Though he was not charged with that robbery, he was caught with an illegal firearm in his possession. After Stokeling pled guilty to the firearms charge, prosecutors argued that he should be sentenced under the provisions of the Armed Career Criminal Act, which imposed a mandatory 15-year sentence due to his previous 3 convictions. Stokeling appealed his sentencing under the ACCA, arguing that his previous robbery conviction — an incident in which Stokeling snatched a necklace from a victim — did not qualify as a 'violent' felony. Specifically, his argument was that the Florida robbery statute did not meet the elements of a violent felony under the ACCA since he could have been convicted even without evidence that he used violent force to overcome his victim's resistance, under the terms of the law.

== In lower courts ==
Stokeling appealed his sentence to the Southern District of Florida Court, which evaluated whether the specific facts and circumstances of Stokeling's prior necklace-snatching conviction was sufficient to meet the requirements of the ACCA. The District Court held that Stokeling's prior robbery conviction did not meet the requirements and reduced his mandatory minimum sentence by half. The United States government appealed this decision to the Eleventh Circuit, which reversed the District Court's decision. Stokeling appealed his case to the Supreme Court in August 2017 and the Supreme Court granted his writ of certiorari in April 2018. Stokeling was represented by Brenda Bryn of the Office of the Federal Public Defender of the Southern District Court of Florida. The United States was represented by Assistant Solicitor General Erica Ross.

== Supreme Court ruling ==
=== Majority ===
The Supreme Court upheld the Eleventh Circuit's ruling. In a 5–4 decision, Justice Clarence Thomas wrote that the Florida statute fit within the guideline set by past Supreme Court precedent and the current interpretation of the Armed Career Criminal Act. He wrote:

“Robbery that must overpower a victim’s will — even a feeble or weak-willed victim — necessarily involves a physical confrontation and struggle. The altercation need not cause pain or injury or even be prolonged; it is the physical contest between the criminal and the victim that is itself ‘capable of causing physical pain or injury.’"

Thomas's opinion was heavily grounded in common law jurisprudence and legislative history, and noted that between 31 and 46 states had statutes that mirrored Florida's and that Congress had intended to accommodate rather than invalidate these statutes.

=== Dissent ===
In her dissent, which was joined by Chief Justice John Roberts as well as Justices Elena Kagan and Ruth Bader Ginsburg, Justice Sonia Sotomayor noted that Congress did not explicitly adopt the common law definition for robbery, and that the interpretation adopted by the majority would encompass too broad a range of crimes. She also argued that the majority opinion did not closely hew to the framework laid out in the previous Supreme Court opinion authored by Antonin Scalia, Johnson v. United States.

== See also ==
- Sessions v. Dimaya (2018)
- United States v. Davis (2019)
- List of United States Supreme Court cases, volume 586
