= Ring v. Arizona =

- Supreme Court of the United States

Argued April 22, 2002 Decided June 24, 2002
- Full case name: Timothy Stuart Ring v. Arizona
- Citations: 536 U.S. 584 (more) 122 S. Ct. 2428; 153 L. Ed. 2d 556; 2002 U.S. LEXIS 4651; 70 U.S.L.W. 4666; 2002 Cal. Daily Op. Service 5594; 2002 Daily Journal DAR 7047; 15 Fla. L. Weekly Fed. S 464

Case history
- Prior: On writ of cert. to the Sup. Court of Arizona. State v. Ring, 200 Ariz. 267

Holding
- A sentencing judge, sitting without a jury, cannot find an aggravating circumstance necessary for imposition of the death penalty. Because Arizona's enumerated aggravating factors operate as "the functional equivalent of an element of a greater offense," the Sixth Amendment requires that they be found by a jury. 597-609.

Court membership
- Chief Justice William Rehnquist Associate Justices John P. Stevens · Sandra Day O'Connor; Antonin Scalia · Anthony Kennedy; David Souter · Clarence Thomas; Ruth Bader Ginsburg · Stephen Breyer

Case opinions
- Majority: Ginsburg, joined by Stevens, Scalia, Kennedy, Souter, Thomas
- Concurrence: Scalia, joined by Thomas
- Concurrence: Kennedy
- Concurrence: Breyer (in judgment)
- Dissent: O'Connor, joined by Rehnquist

Laws applied
- U.S. Const. amend. VI
- This case overturned a previous ruling or rulings
- Walton v. Arizona (1990)

Ring v. Arizona, 536 U.S. 584 (2002), was a case in which the United States Supreme Court applied the rule of Apprendi v. New Jersey to capital sentencing schemes, holding that the Sixth Amendment requires a jury to find the aggravating factors necessary for imposing the death penalty. Ring overruled a portion of Walton v. Arizona, which had rejected that contention.

The case was argued by the Attorney General of Arizona, Janet Napolitano, and future judge Andrew Hurwitz.

== Facts of the case ==
On November 28, 1994, an armored car parked in front of Arrowhead Mall in Glendale, Arizona, was robbed. The driver, John Magoch, was shot in the head as he opened the door to smoke, and died almost instantly. One of the robbers then drove the van to a church in nearby Sun City, where they made off with $562,000 in cash and $271,000 in personal checks. An informant tipped the police off to Timothy Ring and two of his friends, who had recently made expensive purchases such as a new truck. Police eventually discovered that Ring was the ringleader of the operation. Ring was later charged with capital felony murder under Arizona law.

The jury eventually convicted Ring of felony murder, but Ring could not be sentenced to death without further findings, and Arizona law provided that the judge alone would make the findings. After a sentencing hearing, at which Ring's accomplices testified, the judge found that two aggravating factors applied: that Ring had committed the murder in expectation of pecuniary gain and that he had committed the murder in an especially heinous, cruel, or depraved manner. Although he found that Ring had a "minimal" criminal record, the judge concluded that it did not outweigh the aggravating factors and sentenced Ring to death. Ring's accomplices William Ferguson and James Greenham were sentenced to 16 and 27 years respectively for their roles in the crime.

== Apprendi applies to capital sentencing schemes ==
Writing for the majority, Justice Ginsburg began with an important characterization of Arizona's capital sentencing scheme. Based solely on the jury's verdict that Ring was guilty of first-degree murder, the greatest sentence for which Ring was eligible was life in prison. To satisfy the jury-trial requirement of the Sixth Amendment as interpreted by Apprendi, additional factfinding was required. However, in Walton, the Court had expressly held that Arizona's capital sentencing scheme was not subject to such a requirement.

That characterization all but dictated the result. Prior decisions, including Walton, had distinguished between the "elements" of a crime and "sentencing factors." The Sixth Amendment required a jury to find elements but allowed a judge to determine sentencing factors. Under Walton, the aggravating factors were "sentencing factors" because they were the modern vehicle by which judges expressed their traditional sentencing discretion in capital cases. However, after Apprendi, which built on Jones v. United States, 526 U.S. 227 (1999), the relevant inquiry was "one not of form, but of effect." If a particular fact, whether it was called an "element" or a "sentencing factor," exposed the defendant to a greater punishment, then the Court said that the Sixth Amendment required a jury to find it. The Court found no principled basis for exempting capital cases from Apprendi's general rule.

Noting the disparity between Justice Breyer's continued rejection of Apprendi and concurrence in Ring, Justice Antonin Scalia added:

While I am, as always, pleased to travel in Justice Breyer's company, the unfortunate fact is that today's judgment has nothing to do with jury sentencing. What today's decision says is that the jury must find the existence of the fact that an aggravating factor existed. Those States that leave the ultimate life-or-death decision to the judge may continue to do so—by requiring a prior jury finding of aggravating factor in the sentencing phase or, more simply, by placing the aggravating-factor determination (where it logically belongs anyway) in the guilt phase.

Justice Sandra Day O'Connor argued that the Court's decision would have serious consequences, opening up a flood of litigation from death-row inmates and creating uncertainty in the laws of nine other states that employed either total or partial judicial factfinding in death sentences.

== See also ==
- Capital punishment in Arizona
- List of United States Supreme Court cases, volume 536
- List of United States Supreme Court cases
- Schriro v. Summerlin, holding that Ring is not retroactive.
