= Aggravated felony =

Legal term

The term aggravated felony is used in the United States immigration law to refer to a broad category of criminal offenses that carry certain severe consequences for aliens seeking asylum, legal permanent resident status, citizenship, or avoidance of deportation proceedings. Anyone convicted of an aggravated felony and removed from the United States "must remain outside of the United States for twenty consecutive years from the deportation date before he or she is eligible to re-enter the United States." The supreme court ruled 5-4 in Sessions v. Dimaya that the residual clause was unconstitutionally vague limiting the term.

When the category of "aggravated felonies" was first added to the Immigration and Nationality Act in 1988, as a response to heightened concerns about drug abuse, it encompassed only murder and trafficking in drugs or firearms. The Antiterrorism and Effective Death Penalty Act of 1996 (AEDPA) and the Illegal Immigration Reform and Immigrant Responsibility Act of 1996 (IIRIRA) both tremendously expanded the category. AEDPA added crimes related to gambling and passport fraud; IIRIRA added a great many more crimes, including certain crimes of a sentence of at least a year regardless of whether the sentence had been suspended.

== List of aggravated felonies ==
The following chart lists all past aggravated felonies (as of 2018):

List of aggravated felonies
| Letter grade | 8 U.S.C. § 1101(a)(43) |
|---|---|
| (A) | murder, rape, or sexual abuse of a minor; |
| (B) | illicit trafficking in a controlled substance (as defined in section 802 of title 21), including a drug trafficking crime (as defined in section 924(c) of title 18); |
| (C) | illicit trafficking in firearms or destructive devices (as defined in section 921 of title 18) or in explosive materials (as defined in section 841(c) of that title); |
| (D) | an offense described in section 1956 of title 18 (relating to laundering of monetary instruments) or section 1957 of that title (relating to engaging in monetary transactions in property derived from specific unlawful activity) if the amount of the funds exceeded $10,000; |
| (E) | an offense described in — (i) section 842(h) or (i) of title 18, or section 844(d), (e), (f), (g), (h), or (i) of that title (relating to explosive materials offenses); (ii) section 922(g)(1), (2), (3), (4), or (5), (j), (n), (o), (p), or (r) or 924(b) or (h) of title 18 (relating to firearms offenses); or (iii) section 5861 of title 26 (relating to firearms offenses); |
| (F) | a crime of violence (as defined in section 16 of title 18, but not including a purely political offense) for which the term of imprisonment is at least one year; |
| (G) | a theft offense (including receipt of stolen property) or burglary offense for which the term of imprisonment is at least one year; |
| (H) | an offense described in section 875, 876, 877, or 1202 of title 18 (relating to the demand for or receipt of ransom); |
| (I) | an offense described in section 2251, 2251A, or 2252 of title 18 (relating to child pornography); |
| (J) | an offense described in section 1962 of title 18 (relating to racketeer influenced corrupt organizations), or an offense described in section 1084 (if it is a second or subsequent offense) or 1955 of that title (relating to gambling offenses), for which a sentence of one year imprisonment or more may be imposed; |
| (K) | an offense that — (i) relates to the owning, controlling, managing, or supervising of a prostitution business; (ii) is described in section 2421, 2422, or 2423 of title 18 (relating to transportation for the purpose of prostitution) if committed for commercial advantage; or (iii) is described in any of sections 1581–1585 or 1588–1591 of title 18 (relating to peonage, slavery, involuntary servitude, and trafficking in persons); |
| (L) | an offense described in — (i) section 793 (relating to gathering or transmitting national defense information), 798 (relating to disclosure of classified information), 2153 (relating to sabotage) or 2381 or 2382 (relating to treason) of title 18; (ii) section 421 of title 50 (relating to protecting the identity of undercover intelligence agents); or (iii)section 421 of title 50 (relating to protecting the identity of undercover agents); |
| (M) | an offense that — (i) involves fraud or deceit in which the loss to the victim or victims exceeds $10,000; or (ii) is described in section 7201 of title 26 (relating to tax evasion) in which the revenue loss to the Government exceeds $10,000; |
| (N) | an offense described in paragraph (1)(A) or (2) of section 1324(a) of this title (relating to alien smuggling), except in the case of a first offense for which the alien has affirmatively shown that the alien committed the offense for the purpose of assisting, abetting, or aiding only the alien’s spouse, child, or parent (and no other individual) to violate a provision of this chapter; |
| (O) | an offense described in section 1325(a) or 1326 of this title committed by an alien who was previously deported on the basis of a conviction for an offense described in another subparagraph of this paragraph; |
| (P) | an offense (i) which either is falsely making, forging, counterfeiting, mutilating, or altering a passport or instrument in violation of section 1543 of title 18 or is described in section 1546(a) of such title (relating to document fraud) and (ii) for which the term of imprisonment is at least 12 months, except in the case of a first offense for which the alien has affirmatively shown that the alien committed the offense for the purpose of assisting, abetting, or aiding only the alien’s spouse, child, or parent (and no other individual) to violate a provision of this chapter; |
| (Q) | an offense relating to a failure to appear by a defendant for service of sentence if the underlying offense is punishable by imprisonment for a term of 5 years or more; |
| (R) | an offense relating to commercial bribery, counterfeiting, forgery, or trafficking in vehicles the identification numbers of which have been altered for which the term of imprisonment is at least one year; |
| (S) | an offense relating to obstruction of justice, perjury or subornation of perjury, or bribery of a witness, for which the term of imprisonment is at least one year; |
| (T) | an offense relating to a failure to appear before a court pursuant to a court order to answer to or dispose of a charge of a felony for which a sentence of 2 years’ imprisonment or more may be imposed; and |
| (U) | an attempt or conspiracy to commit an offense described in this paragraph. |

== Controversial issues involving an aggravated felony ==
The definition of aggravated felony has significantly expanded since its inception in 1988. A series of amendments have expanded its reach to the point that an aggravated felony need not be aggravated, nor a felony, to trigger the consequences of such a conviction. In United States of America v. Winston C. Graham, 169 F.3d 787 (3rd Cir. 1999), the Third Circuit Court of Appeals held that the respondent's 1990 petit larceny, a Class A misdemeanor with a maximum of one year imprisonment under New York law, constitutes an aggravated felony.

This case requires us to determine whether a misdemeanor can be an "aggravated felony" under a provision of federal law even if it is not, technically speaking, a felony at all. The particular question before us is whether petit larceny, a class A misdemeanor under New York law that carries a maximum sentence of one year, can subject a federal defendant to the extreme sanctions imposed by the "aggravated felon" classification. Despite our misgivings that, in pursuit of a clearly defined legislative goal (to severely punish unlawful reentry into this country), a carelessly drafted piece of legislation has improvidently, if not inadvertently, broken the historic line of division between felonies and misdemeanors, we conclude that Congress was sufficiently clear in its intent to include certain crimes with one-year sentences in the definition of "aggravated felony"...

— Becker, Chief Judge, U.S. Court of Appeals for the Third Circuit

In Lopez v. Gonzales, 549 U.S. 47 (2006), the Supreme Court ruled that because immigration law is under the control of the federal government, the definitions of any terms on the aggravated felony list comes from federal law, not state law. This holding calls into question the result in Graham because under federal law a crime must be punishable by imprisonment for a term "exceeding" one year in order to be considered an aggravated felony, otherwise it is cruel and unusual punishment under the Eighth Amendment to the United States Constitution. In 18 U.S.C. § 921(a)(20), Congress explains that the term "crime punishable by imprisonment for a term exceeding one year does not include ... any State offense classified by the laws of the State as a misdemeanor and punishable by a term of imprisonment of two years or less."

In Leocal v. Ashcroft, 543 U.S. 1 (2004), the Court ruled that driving under the influence is not an aggravated felony if the DUI statute that defines the offense does not contain a mens rea element or otherwise allows a conviction for merely negligent conduct.

In Popal v. Gonzales, 416 F.3d 249, 254 (3d Cir. 2005), the Third Circuit Court of Appeals held that Pennsylvania simple assault does not constitute crime of violence under 18 USC § 16(a) and is therefore not an aggravate felony.

In Sessions v. Dimaya, The Supreme Court struck down the "residual clause", which classified every felony that, "by its nature, involves a substantial risk" of "physical force against the person or property" as an aggravated felony

=== Consequences of an aggravated felony conviction ===
An alien convicted of an aggravated felony may not:

- enter the United States without being pardoned or paroled by the government
- have removal orders cancelled without specific authorization of the Attorney General
- receive asylum in the United States, although he or she may possibly qualify for the United Nations Convention against Torture (CAT) but depending on the case and situation of his or hers country of origin
- become a citizen of the United States

At the same time, any alien convicted of an aggravated felony is automatically subject to expedited removal intended to ensure that the deportation occurs as soon as the alien is released from prison after serving the sentence imposed for the underlying crime. These deportation orders are not subject to review by the federal courts, although federal courts have ruled that they may determine which crime constitutes an aggravated felony.

IIRIRA required that any alien convicted of an aggravated felony must be detained while awaiting removal, resulting in the detention of far more aliens than before the Act took effect. In Demore v. Kim, 538 U.S. 510 (2003), the Court ruled that the mandatory detention provision of IIRIRA was constitutional.

=== Consequences of illegal re-entry after deportation ===
A related use of the term "aggravated felony" comes in the context of the definition of the crime of illegal reentry into the United States following deportation, 8 U.S.C. § 1326, and the corresponding sentencing enhancement provided by the Federal Sentencing Guidelines. It is a crime for an alien to illegally enter or be found without permission in the United States after that alien has been deported. The maximum sentence for this crime is 2 years; however, if that deportation follows a conviction for an aggravated felony, the maximum sentence increases to 20 years.

Furthermore, the guideline that corresponds to this crime typically doubles or triples the sentence the alien would otherwise have received if the deportation follows conviction for an aggravated felony. In Almendarez-Torres v. United States, 523 U.S. 224 (1998), the Supreme Court held that this increased maximum sentence did not violate the Sixth Amendment.

== Comparison to crimes involving moral turpitude (CIMT) ==
The consequences of making a crime an aggravated felony are far reaching. One major consequence is that, unlike the deportability ground for a crime involving moral turpitude (CIMT), aggravated felonies do not have to be committed within five years after admission into the U.S. to give rise to deportability. (E.g. a Lawful Permanent Resident who was admitted into the U.S. as a small child and who commits an aggravated felony at age 60 becomes deportable).

Some aggravated felonies make a person deportable without regard to the actual or potential sentence attached to the conviction. For details, see list of aggravated felonies in the chart at the top.

== Sources ==
- Immigration Law and Procedure, 5th ed., by David Weissbrodt and Laura Danielson
