= United States v. Rodriquez =

- Supreme Court of the United States

Argued January 15, 2008 Decided May 19, 2008
- Full case name: United States v. Gino Gonzaga Rodriquez
- Docket no.: 06-1646
- Citations: 553 U.S. 377 (more) 128 S. Ct. 1783; 170 L. Ed. 2d 719

Case history
- Prior: 464 F.3d 1072 (9th Cir. 2006); cert. granted, 551 U.S. 1191 (2007).
- Subsequent: 471 F. App'x 727 (9th Cir. 2012); cert. denied, 568 U.S. 934 (2012).

Holding
- A Washington state drug-trafficking conviction, for which the maximum term was 10 years under the state recidivist provision, qualifies as "a serious drug offense" under the Armed Career Criminal Act.

Court membership
- Chief Justice John Roberts Associate Justices John P. Stevens · Antonin Scalia; Anthony Kennedy · David Souter; Clarence Thomas · Ruth Bader Ginsburg; Stephen Breyer · Samuel Alito

Case opinions
- Majority: Alito, joined by Roberts, Scalia, Kennedy, Thomas, Breyer
- Dissent: Souter, joined by Stevens, Ginsburg

Laws applied
- Armed Career Criminal Act, 18 U.S.C. § 924(e)

United States v. Rodriquez, 553 U.S. 377 (2008), was a United States Supreme Court case interpreting the Armed Career Criminal Act. Justice Samuel Alito, writing for the 6–3 majority, ruled that although the elements of a crime may not be considered "serious," sentence enhancements related to a defendant's prior record will bear on how the determination is made.

== Overview ==
The respondent, Gino Rodriquez, was released from prison in 2004. Soon thereafter, he violated the terms of his parole and was later apprehended in possession of heroin and a pistol. Prosecutors argued that Rodriquez was subject to the Armed Career Criminal Act (ACCA), which applies to those convicted of being a felon in possession of a firearm if they have a total of three previous convictions for violent felonies or serious drug offenses. Rodriquez had two California burglary convictions. Prosecutors argued that the third required conviction was supplied by Rodriquez’s Washington state drug offenses. Although none of the three drug convictions, on their own, was considered "serious," the second and third were repeat offenses and were punishable by ten-year sentences, which qualify as serious under ACCA.

== Procedural history ==
Rodriquez was convicted in the United States District Court for the Eastern District of Washington for possession of a firearm by a convicted felon, in violation of the ACCA. The District Court held that respondent's drug-trafficking convictions were not convictions for "serious drug offense[s]" under ACCA because the "maximum term of imprisonment" is determined without reference to recidivist enhancements. On appeal, the Court of Appeals for the Ninth Circuit affirmed, holding that "the maximum term of imprisonment ... prescribed by law" must be determined without taking recidivist enhancements into account. The Supreme Court granted certiorari.

== Decision ==
=== Issue ===
Does a crime qualify as "serious" for purposes of the Armed Career Criminal Act when the underlying offense is not considered grave, but carries a high prison sentence because it was not the first crime the defendant committed?

=== Opinion of the Court ===
Justice Alito, writing for the Court, reversed, holding that the most straightforward reading of ACCA is that the sentence, as enhanced by relevant law, is the "sentence" referred to in the statute. As such, Rodriquez's drug offense counts as a "serious" crime, and as the third such crime he committed. "In sum, a straightforward application of the language of ACCA leads to the conclusion that the 'maximum term of imprisonment prescribed by law' in this case was 10 years."

== Dissent ==
Justice Souter wrote a dissent, in which Justices Ginsburg and Stevens joined. Souter wrote that the text of ACCA was ambiguous, and in such cases the traditional rule of construction was to apply lenity in criminal statutes.

== See all ==
- List of United States Supreme Court cases, volume 553
