= Sykes v. United States =

- Supreme Court of the United States

Argued January 12, 2011 Decided June 9, 2011
- Full case name: Sykes v. United States
- Docket no.: 09-11311
- Citations: 564 U.S. 1 (more) 131 S. Ct. 2267; 180 L. Ed. 2d 60
- Argument: Oral argument

Case history
- Prior: Sentence enhancement affirmed, 598 F.3d 334 (7th Cir. 2010); cert. granted, 561 U.S. 1058 (2010).

Holding
- Felony vehicle flight, as proscribed by Indiana law, is a violent felony for purposes of the Armed Career Criminal Act.

Court membership
- Chief Justice John Roberts Associate Justices Antonin Scalia · Anthony Kennedy; Clarence Thomas · Ruth Bader Ginsburg; Stephen Breyer · Samuel Alito; Sonia Sotomayor · Elena Kagan

Case opinions
- Majority: Kennedy, joined by Roberts, Breyer, Alito, and Sotomayor
- Concurrence: Thomas (in judgment)
- Dissent: Scalia
- Dissent: Kagan, joined by Ginsburg
- Overruled by
- Johnson v. United States (2015)

Sykes v. United States, 564 U.S. 1 (2011), was a case in which the Supreme Court of the United States held that felony vehicle flight, as proscribed by Indiana law, is a violent felony for purposes of the residual clause of the Armed Career Criminal Act (ACCA). Writing for the majority, Justice Kennedy wrote that vehicle flight requires officers to give chase, resulting in more injuries on average than burglary. Dissenting, Justice Scalia criticized the majority for producing an ad hoc judgment based on vague legislation, suggesting they should declare the residual clause of the law unconstitutionally vague. The court would follow that advice several years later in Johnson v. United States and declare the residual clause unconstitutionally vague.

== See also ==
- List of United States Supreme Court cases, volume 564
