= Erlinger v. United States =

United States Supreme Court case

- Supreme Court of the United States

Argued March 27, 2024 Decided June 21, 2024
- Full case name: Paul Erlinger v. United States
- Docket no.: 23-370
- Citations: 602 U.S. 821 (more) 144 S.Ct. 1840, 219 L.Ed.2d 451
- Argument: Oral argument

Case history
- Prior: United States v. Erlinger, 77 F.4th 617 (7th Cir. 2023).

Questions presented
- Whether the Constitution requires a jury trial and proof beyond a reasonable doubt to find that a defendant's prior convictions were "committed on occasions different from one another," as is necessary to impose an enhanced sentence under the Armed Career Criminal Act, 18 U.S.C. § 924(e)(1).

Holding
- The Fifth and Sixth Amendments require a unanimous jury to make the determination beyond a reasonable doubt that a defendant’s past offenses were committed on separate occasions for ACCA purposes.

Court membership
- Chief Justice John Roberts Associate Justices Clarence Thomas · Samuel Alito; Sonia Sotomayor · Elena Kagan; Neil Gorsuch · Brett Kavanaugh; Amy Coney Barrett · Ketanji Brown Jackson

Case opinions
- Majority: Gorsuch, joined by Roberts, Thomas, Sotomayor, Kagan, Barrett
- Concurrence: Roberts
- Concurrence: Thomas
- Dissent: Kavanaugh, joined by Alito; Jackson (except Part III)
- Dissent: Jackson

Laws applied
- U.S. Const. amends. VI, 18 U.S.C. § 924(e)(1)

Erlinger v. United States, 602 U.S. 821 (2024), was a United States Supreme Court case relating to the right to a jury trial in criminal cases under the Fifth and Sixth Amendments. The case was argued on March 27, 2024, and decided on June 21.

== Background ==
Paul Erlinger was charged and convicted of being a felon in possession of a firearm in 2018. He was sentenced to 15 years and sought post-conviction relief. The District Court found that Erlinger had committed three separate burglaries, making him eligible for the ACCA enhancement. Erlinger objected, arguing that the burglary question should have been found by a jury. The Supreme Court held in Apprendi v. New Jersey that:

"[o]ther than the fact of a prior conviction, any fact that increases the penalty for a crime beyond the prescribed statutory maximum must be submitted to a jury, and proved beyond a reasonable doubt."

— Justice Stevens, Apprendi v. New Jersey, 530 U.S. 466, 490 (2000).

The United States District Court for the Southern District of Indiana overruled his objection and re-imposed the 15-year sentence. Erlinger appealed to the United States Court of Appeals for the Seventh Circuit, which affirmed his sentence, holding that the government was only required to prove the burglary question to the judge by a preponderance of the evidence, as opposed to beyond a reasonable doubt. The Supreme Court granted certiorari on November 20, 2023.

== See also ==
- Apprendi v. New Jersey
- Blakely v. Washington
- United States v. Booker
