= United States v. Stitt =

- Supreme Court of the United States

Decided December 10, 2018
- Full case name: United States v. Stitt
- Docket no.: 17-765
- Citations: 586 U.S. ___ (more)

Holding
- The term "burglary" in the Armed Career Criminal Act includes burglary of a structure or vehicle that has been adapted or is customarily used for overnight accommodation.

Court membership
- Chief Justice John Roberts Associate Justices Clarence Thomas · Ruth Bader Ginsburg; Stephen Breyer · Samuel Alito; Sonia Sotomayor · Elena Kagan; Neil Gorsuch · Brett Kavanaugh

Case opinion
- Majority: Breyer, joined by unanimous

Laws applied
- Armed Career Criminal Act

United States v. Stitt, 586 U.S. ___ (2018), was a United States Supreme Court case in which the court held that the term "burglary" in the Armed Career Criminal Act includes burglary of a structure or vehicle that has been adapted or is customarily used for overnight accommodation.
