= Welch v. United States =

- Supreme Court of the United States

Argued March 30, 2016 Decided April 18, 2016
- Full case name: Gregory Welch, Petitioner v. United States
- Docket no.: 15-6418
- Citations: 578 U.S. 120 (more) 136 S. Ct. 1257; 194 L. Ed. 2d 387
- Related cases: Johnson v. United States
- Argument: Oral argument
- Opinion announcement: Opinion announcement

Case history
- Prior: United States v. Welch, 683 F.3d 1304 (11th Cir. 2012); cert. denied, 568 U.S. 1112 (2013); cert. granted, 136 S. Ct. 790 (2016).

Holding
- Johnson v. United States announced a substantive rule change and is thus retroactive.

Court membership
- Chief Justice John Roberts Associate Justices Anthony Kennedy · Clarence Thomas; Ruth Bader Ginsburg · Stephen Breyer; Samuel Alito · Sonia Sotomayor; Elena Kagan

Case opinions
- Majority: Kennedy, joined by Roberts, Ginsburg, Breyer, Alito, Sotomayor, Kagan
- Dissent: Thomas

Welch v. United States, 578 U.S. 120 (2016), was a United States Supreme Court case in which the Court ruled that the decision in Johnson v. United States announced a substantive rule change and is therefore retroactive.

== Background ==
United States law prohibits convicted felons from possessing a firearm. The maximum sentence for a felon convicted under this statute is 10 years, but the sentence is enhanced to a minimum of 15 years and a maximum of life imprisonment if the felon had three or more prior convictions for drug or violent felonies. The Armed Career Criminal Act defines "violent felony" as:

...any crime punishable by imprisonment for a term exceeding one year...that—any crime punishable by imprisonment for a term exceeding one year . . . that— (i) has as an element the use, attempted use, or threatened use of physical force against the person of another; or (ii) is burglary, arson, or extortion, involves use of explosives, or otherwise involves conduct that presents a serious potential risk of physical injury to another.

Gregory Welch pleaded guilty to one count of being a felon in possession of a firearm in 2010. The presentence report claimed that Welch had previously been convicted of three violent felonies, and thus was subject to the enhanced sentence of at least 15 years in prison under the Armed Career Criminal Act. The District Court overruled Welch's objection that one of the three offenses was not a violent offense, stating that it was a violent felony under both the element clause ((i) above) and the residual clause ((ii) above). Welch was then sentenced to 15 years in prison. Welch appealed to the Court of Appeals for the Eleventh Circuit, which ruled that the offense was a violent felony under the residual clause, but did not decide whether it qualified under the element clause. The Supreme Court denied certiorari in 2013, making the sentence final.

Welch then entered a habeas corpus challenge, claiming that the strong arm robbery conviction, one of the three prior felonies, was impermissibly vague, which the District Court denied. It further refused to grant a certificate of appealability. He then sought a certificate of appealability from the Court of Appeals, noting that Johnson was pending before the Supreme Court. The Court of Appeals denied the certificate. Three weeks later, the Supreme Court ruled in Johnson v. United States that the residual clause, under which Welch was sentenced, was unconstitutional. Welch then submitted a motion to the Court of Appeals for more time to ask for reconsideration, but it was not filed as the time to seek reconsideration had passed. Continuing pro se (i.e., without a lawyer), Welch filed a petition for certiorari in the Supreme Court. Welch later retained Supreme Court lawyer Amir H. Ali to represent him, and the Supreme Court granted review.

=== Oral argument ===
The Supreme Court expedited the briefing process so that the case could be heard and decided within the same term that certiorari was granted. Ali presented oral argument on behalf of Welch, in his first Supreme Court argument. Michael Dreeben, then Deputy Solicitor General of the United States, presented argument on behalf of the United States and conceded that Johnson is retroactive. As the United States had conceded error, the Supreme Court appointed Helgi C. Walker as an amicus curiae to argue in support of the lower court's ruling.

At oral argument, Welch and the United States argued that Johnson should be considered retroactive. The Court has previously held that only "substantive" rule changes are considered retroactive while "procedural" changes are not. Welch argued that because the effect of the Johnson ruling was to change the sentence range, the law should be considered substantive (and thus retroactive). Walker, arguing against retroactivity as an amicus, advanced the argument that, since the source of the ruling was a procedural constitutional provision, Johnson should not be held as retroactive.

== Opinion of the Court ==
In a 7–1 decision authored by Associate Justice Anthony Kennedy, the Court ruled that Johnson announced a substantive rule change and was thus retroactive. The decision also held that the lower courts had erred in denying a certificate of appealability, as reasonable jurists could disagree on the outcome given the decision in Johnson.

The lone dissenter was Associate Justice Clarence Thomas, who wrote that the majority had undermined "any principled limitation on the finality of federal convictions".
