= Borden v. United States =

- Supreme Court of the United States

Argued November 3, 2020 Decided June 10, 2021
- Full case name: Charles Borden, Jr. v. United States
- Docket no.: 19-5410
- Citations: 593 U.S. 420 (more) 141 S. Ct. 1817; 210 L. Ed. 2d 63

Case history
- Prior: United States v. Borden, 769 F. App'x 266 (6th Cir. 2019); Cert. granted, 140 S. Ct. 1262 (2020)

Holding
- A criminal offense with a mens rea of recklessness does not qualify as a "violent felony" under the Armed Career Criminal Act's elements clause.

Court membership
- Chief Justice John Roberts Associate Justices Clarence Thomas · Stephen Breyer; Samuel Alito · Sonia Sotomayor; Elena Kagan · Neil Gorsuch; Brett Kavanaugh · Amy Coney Barrett

Case opinions
- Plurality: Kagan, joined by Breyer, Sotomayor, Gorsuch
- Concurrence: Thomas (in judgment)
- Dissent: Kavanaugh, joined by Roberts, Alito, Barrett

Laws applied
- Armed Career Criminal Act

Borden v. United States, 593 U.S. 420 (2021), was a United States Supreme Court case involving the classification of prior convictions for "violent felony" in application of Armed Career Criminal Act (ACCA); the ACCA provides for enhanced sentencing for convicted criminals with three or more such felonies in their history. In a 5–4 decision in June 2021, the Supreme Court ruled that crimes resulting from reckless conduct should not be considered as a "violent felony" for the purposes of the ACCA.

== Background ==
The Armed Career Criminal Act (ACCA) of 1984 is a federal law that provides for enhanced, minimum sentences for convicted criminals that have three or more convictions for violent felonies or serious drug offenses on their record. Past case law involving the ACCA has led to questions of what constitutes a violent felony to qualify under the ACCA.

Charles Borden Jr. was pulled over in a traffic stop in Tennessee in April 2017 and discovered to have a firearm in his vehicle. As he had a prior felony conviction on his record, he was charged with being a felon in possession of a firearm; since he had three Tennessee convictions for aggravated assault, the government also charged him under the ACCA's provisions. Borden ultimately pled guilty; ordinarily a felon-in-possession offense carries a maximum term of ten years, but application of the ACCA increased his potential sentence from a maximum of ten years to a minimum of fifteen.

Borden argued before the United States District Court for the Eastern District of Tennessee that since one of his prior aggravated assault convictions was for reckless (as opposed to intentional) conduct, it should not be considered a violent crime under the ACCA, and thus that the ACCA's guideline increase should not apply to him. The District Court overruled this argument, holding that the aggravated assault offense was a violent felony, and after giving him credit for cooperation, ultimately sentenced him to nine years and seven months of imprisonment. The Sixth Circuit upheld the District Court's decision.

== Supreme Court ==
Borden petitioned the Supreme Court, asking whether a criminal act with a mens rea of recklessness should be considered as a violent felony under the ACCA. The Court granted certiorari for the case in March 2020. Oral argument was held on November 3, 2020.

The Court issued its opinion on June 10, 2021. In a 5–4 vote, the Court reversed the Sixth Circuit's decision and remanded the case for review. The plurality decision was written by Justice Elena Kagan and joined by Justices Stephen Breyer, Sonia Sotomayor, and Neil Gorsuch. Kagan wrote that crimes involving the mens rea of recklessness should not be categorized as "violent felonies" for purposes of the ACCA. Justice Clarence Thomas wrote a concurrence, joining only in the judgment of the case.

A dissenting opinion was written by Justice Brett Kavanaugh, and joined by Chief Justice John Roberts and Justices Samuel Alito and Amy Coney Barrett.
