= Southern Union Co. v. United States =

- Supreme Court of the United States

Argued March 19, 2012 Decided June 21, 2012
- Full case name: Southern Union Company v. United States
- Docket no.: 11-94
- Citations: 567 U.S. 343 (more) 132 S. Ct. 2344; 183 L. Ed. 2d 318; 2012 U.S. LEXIS 4662; 74 ERC 1609; 80 U.S.L.W. 4525

Case history
- Prior: United States v. Southern Union Co., 643 F. Supp. 2d 201 (D.R.I. 2009); affirmed, 630 F.3d 17 (1st Cir. 2010); cert. granted, 565 U.S. 1057 (2011).
- Subsequent: On remand, 942 F. Supp. 2d 235 (D.R.I. 2013)

Holding
- Apprendi applies to criminal fines.

Court membership
- Chief Justice John Roberts Associate Justices Antonin Scalia · Anthony Kennedy; Clarence Thomas · Ruth Bader Ginsburg; Stephen Breyer · Samuel Alito; Sonia Sotomayor · Elena Kagan

Case opinions
- Majority: Sotomayor, joined by Roberts, Scalia, Thomas, Ginsburg, Kagan
- Dissent: Breyer, joined by Kennedy, Alito

Southern Union Co. v. United States, 567 U.S. 343 (2012), was a Supreme Court decision that applied the rule set out in Apprendi v. New Jersey—that certain non-conviction elements of a crime must be proved to a jury—to criminal penalties. The 6–3 decision was authored by Justice Sonia Sotomayor.

== Background ==
Southern Union Company was convicted of storing hazardous liquid mercury without a permit, "on or about September 19, 2002 to October 19, 2004," in violation of the Resource Conservation and Recovery Act. The jury was not asked to determine the exact duration of the violation. In sentencing, the probation office set a maximum fine of $38.1 million, calculated by assessing the $50,000 maximum daily fine for each of the 762 days between September 19, 2002, and October 19, 2004. Respondent appealed on the basis that the jury never determined the exact duration of the violation. The Court of Appeals for the First Circuit upheld the sentence, agreeing that the jury had not determined the duration of the violation, but holding that Apprendi did not apply to criminal fines.

The Supreme Court reversed, holding there is no principled distinction between criminal fines and imprisonment for the purpose of Apprendi because Apprendi requires that any fact other than a prior conviction that increases the penalty for a crime beyond the statutory maximum must be submitted to the jury and determined beyond a reasonable doubt. The rule preserves the historic fact-finding function of the jury, deciding that where a fine is sufficiently substantial to trigger the Sixth Amendment jury-trial guarantee, Apprendi applies.

== See also ==
- List of United States Supreme Court cases, volume 567
- Apprendi v. New Jersey (2000)
- Alleyne v. United States (2013)
