= Schriro v. Summerlin =

- Supreme Court of the United States

Argued April 19, 2004 Decided June 24, 2004
- Full case name: Dora B. Schriro, Director, Arizona Department of Corrections v. Warren Wesley Summerlin
- Citations: 542 U.S. 348 (more) 124 S. Ct. 2519; 159 L. Ed. 2d 442; 2004 U.S. LEXIS 4574; 72 U.S.L.W. 4561; 17 Fla. L. Weekly Fed. S 425

Case history
- Prior: Summerlin v. Stewart. 267 F.3d 926 (9th Cir. 2001).; Opinion withdrawn. 281 F.3d 836 (9th Cir. 2002).; On rehearing en banc, 341 F.3d 1082 (9th Cir. 2003).; Cert. granted. 540 U.S. 1045 (2003).
- Subsequent: Summerlin v. Schriro, 427 F.3d 623

Holding
- Ring v. Arizona does not apply retroactively to cases already final on direct review.

Court membership
- Chief Justice William Rehnquist Associate Justices John P. Stevens · Sandra Day O'Connor; Antonin Scalia · Anthony Kennedy; David Souter · Clarence Thomas; Ruth Bader Ginsburg · Stephen Breyer

Case opinions
- Majority: Scalia, joined by Rehnquist, O'Connor, Kennedy, Thomas
- Dissent: Breyer, joined by Stevens, Souter, Ginsburg

Schriro v. Summerlin, 542 U.S. 348 (2004), was a case in which the United States Supreme Court held that its prior holding in Ring v. Arizona did not apply retroactively in collateral federal habeas corpus proceedings.

== Facts ==
In April 1981, Warren Wesley Summerlin killed a creditor who had come to his home in Phoenix, Arizona, to inquire about a debt. He was later convicted of first-degree murder and received a death sentence. Under Arizona law at the time, a jury decided the question of guilt but a judge sitting without a jury decided the question of penalty after receiving evidence regarding aggravating and mitigating factors. The Arizona Supreme Court affirmed the death sentence. While the appeal in his habeas corpus case was pending in the Ninth Circuit, the Supreme Court decided Ring v. Arizona, which held that such aggravating factors had to be proved to a jury rather than a judge. The Ninth Circuit ruled that the Ring decision applied to Summerlin's case even though Ring was decided after Summerlin's conviction had become final on direct review. The state appealed this decision to the Supreme Court.

== Result ==
The Court, in an opinion by Justice Scalia, reversed the decision of the Ninth Circuit Court of Appeals, and stated that "we give retroactive effect to only a small set of 'watershed rules of criminal procedure implementing the fundamental fairness and accuracy of the criminal proceeding.' That a new procedural rule is 'fundamental' in some abstract sense is not enough; the rule must be one 'without which the likelihood of an accurate conviction is seriously diminished."

== See also ==
- Capital punishment in Arizona
- List of United States Supreme Court cases, volume 542
- List of United States Supreme Court cases
