= Begay v. United States =

- Supreme Court of the United States

Argued January 15, 2008 Decided April 16, 2008
- Full case name: Larry Begay v. United States
- Docket no.: 06-11543
- Citations: 553 U.S. 137 (more) 128 S. Ct. 1581; 170 L. Ed. 2d 490; 2008 U.S. LEXIS 3474; 76 U.S.L.W. 4228; 21 Fla. L. Weekly Fed. S 188; 08 Cal. Daily Op. Serv. 4462, 2008 Daily Journal D.A.R. 5389

Case history
- Prior: Writ of certiorari to the U.S. Court of Appeals for the Tenth Circuit. 470 F.3d 964.

Holding
- Felony driving while intoxicated is not a “violent felony” within meaning of section of the Armed Career Criminal Act imposing special mandatory 15-year prison term upon felons who unlawfully possess a firearm and who have three or more convictions for violent felonies.

Court membership
- Chief Justice John Roberts Associate Justices John P. Stevens · Antonin Scalia; Anthony Kennedy · David Souter; Clarence Thomas · Ruth Bader Ginsburg; Stephen Breyer · Samuel Alito

Case opinions
- Majority: Breyer, joined by Roberts, Stevens, Kennedy, Ginsburg
- Concurrence: Scalia (in judgment)
- Dissent: Alito, joined by Souter, Thomas

Laws applied
- 18 U.S.C. § 924(e)(1)
- Abrogated by
- Johnson v. United States (2015)

Begay v. United States, 553 U.S. 137 (2008), is a United States Supreme Court case which held that felony driving while intoxicated is not a "violent felony" for purposes of the Armed Career Criminal Act.

== Background ==
Larry Begay had multiple felony convictions for driving under the influence of alcohol (DUI) in New Mexico. He was found to be in possession of a firearm when he was arrested by the local police in a domestic incident. (Note: Begay had pointed a rifle at his sister and aunt and had pulled the trigger, but the weapon failed to discharge. The police were called and found Begay in possession of a .22 caliber rifle.)

Under federal law it is illegal for a convicted felon to possess a firearm. (Note: The federal Gun Control Act, at 18 U.S.C. §922(g)(1), makes it a crime for a convicted felon to possess a firearm.) Begay pleaded guilty in federal court to unlawful possession of a firearm. The pre-sentencing report showed that Begay had been convicted twelve times of DUI. Under New Mexico law, each DUI conviction after the first three was considered a felony. (Note: Accordingly, Begay had at least nine felony convictions for DUI, and may have had more if any of his first three DUI convictions was felonious.)

The U.S. District Court for the District of New Mexico concluded that DUI was a "violent felony" under the Armed Career Criminal Act, (Note: 18 U. S. C. §924(e)(1)) thereby triggering that Act's 15-year mandatory minimum sentence. A divided United States Court of Appeals for the Tenth Circuit panel affirmed the decision to treat the DUIs as "violent felonies."

== Opinion of the Court ==
In a 6–3 vote, the Court held that DUI was not a "violent felony" because the crime was too different from the violent felony examples provided by Congress in the Armed Career Criminal Act (such as burglary, arson and extortion). Therefore, Begay should not have been subject to the mandatory sentencing hike.

Justice Breyer wrote the majority opinion with Justice Scalia concurring. Justice Alito dissented, with Justices Thomas and Souter, joining.

== See also ==
- Leocal v. Ashcroft
