= Brown v. United States (2024) =

Brown v. United States Jackson v. United States
- Supreme Court of the United States

Argued November 27, 2023 Decided May 23, 2024
- Full case name: Justin Rashaad Brown v. United States; Eugene Jackson v. United States
- Docket nos.: 22-6389; 22-6640

Case history
- Prior: United States v. Brown, 47 F.4th 147 (3d Cir. 2022). United States v. Brown (M.D. Pa. 2021). United States v. Jackson, 55 F.4th 846 (11th Cir. 2022) United States v. Jackson, 36 F.4th 1294 (11th Cir. 2022)

Questions presented
- 1) Which version of federal law should a sentencing court consult under ACCA’s categorical approach? 2) Whether the "serious drug offense" definition in the Armed Career Criminal Act, 18 U.S.C. § 924(e)(2)(A)(ii), incorporates the federal drug schedules that were in effect at the time of the federal firearm offense (as the Third, Fourth, Eighth, and Tenth Circuits have held), or the federal drug schedules that were in effect at the time of the prior state drug offense (as the Eleventh Circuit held below).

Holding
- A state drug conviction counts as an ACCA predicate if it involved a drug on the federal schedules at the time of that conviction.

Court membership
- Chief Justice John Roberts Associate Justices Clarence Thomas · Samuel Alito; Sonia Sotomayor · Elena Kagan; Neil Gorsuch · Brett Kavanaugh; Amy Coney Barrett · Ketanji Brown Jackson

Case opinions
- Majority: Alito, joined by Roberts, Thomas, Sotomayor, Kavanaugh, Barrett
- Dissent: Jackson, joined by Kagan; Gorsuch (only parts I, II, III)

Brown v. United States, 602 U.S. 101 (2024), is a United States Supreme Court case about the Armed Career Criminal Act (ACCA). The Supreme Court affirmed both courts of appeals, holding that a state drug conviction counts as an ACCA predicate if it involved a drug on the federal schedules at the time of that conviction.

== Background ==
=== Factual background in Brown v. United States ===
In 2016, Justin Rashaad Brown was arrested during a search relating to the buying and selling of controlled drugs. During the search, officers found drugs, money, and a revolver. Brown was later indicted for unlawfully possessing a firearm. In the time between his arrest and sentencing, Congress passed the Agriculture Improvement Act of 2018. This act amended the CSA to remove hemp from the federal definition of marijuana. In 2019, Brown pleaded guilty to the firearm and drug charges arising from his 2016 arrest. He had previously been convicted five times of Pennsylvania drug laws, one relating to cocaine and four relating to marijuana. The District Court, finding that these five offenses constituted "serious drug offenses", sentenced him to concurrent fifteen year terms of imprisonment. On appeal, Brown argued that his prior marijuana convictions could not serve as ACCA predicates because they criminalize hemp, while the CSA had since been amended to exclude hemp from the definition of marijuana. The United States Court of Appeals for the Third Circuit disagreed, holding that the law at the time of the offense should control, rather than the law at the time of sentencing.

=== Factual background in Jackson v. United States ===
Stemming from his actions in 2017, Eugene Jackson pleaded guilty in the Southern District of Florida to one count of being a felon in possession of a firearm. A pre-sentence report recommended that Jackson be sentenced under the ACCA, and thus be given the mandatory fifteen year minimum prison sentence. While Jackson conceded that he had two prior felony convictions that were ACCA predicates, he disputed that his 1998 and 2004 cocaine-related convictions could serve as ACCA predicates. These two convictions involved a cocaine derivative that, at the time, was prohibited by both Florida law and the CSA. In the time between Jackson's drug convictions and his firearm offense, the cocaine derivative was removed from the federal CSA schedules. Since the drug was not federally prohibited at the time of the firearm offense, Jackson argued that any conviction arising from possession of the drug should not count as an ACCA predicate. The District Court disagreed and imposed the mandatory fifteen-year sentence. Initially on appeal, the United States Court of Appeals for the Eleventh Circuit unanimously reversed Jackson's sentence. Later, the Court vacated its own opinion and requested supplemental briefing. It went on to reverse its own opinion and uphold Jackson's sentence.

== Supreme Court ==
On December 21, 2022, Brown petitioned the Supreme Court to hear his case. On January 24, 2023, Jackson petitioned the Court to hear his case. On May 15, 2023, both petitions were granted, and Jackson's case was consolidated with Brown's. Oral were held on November 27, 2023. The case was argued by Jeffrey Green, Andrew Adler, and Austin Raynor on behalf of Brown, Jackson, and the United States, respectively.

On May 23, 2024, the Supreme Court affirmed the decisions of both courts of appeals, holding that state drug convictions based on federally controlled substances applied at the time of conviction, not sentencing.
