= Leocal v. Ashcroft =

- Supreme Court of the United States

Argued October 12, 2004 Decided November 9, 2004
- Full case name: Josue Leocal v. John D. Ashcroft, Attorney General of the United States
- Citations: 543 U.S. 1 (more) 125 S. Ct. 377; 160 L. Ed. 2d 271; 73 U.S.L.W. 4001

Case history
- Prior: Deportation order affirmed by the Board of Immigration Appeals; petition for review in the Eleventh Circuit denied; cert. granted, 540 U.S. 1176 (2004).

Holding
- DUI crimes that have either no mens rea element or require merely negligence for a conviction are not "crimes of violence" that subject aliens to deportation.

Court membership
- Chief Justice William Rehnquist Associate Justices John P. Stevens · Sandra Day O'Connor; Antonin Scalia · Anthony Kennedy; David Souter · Clarence Thomas; Ruth Bader Ginsburg · Stephen Breyer

Case opinion
- Majority: Rehnquist, joined by unanimous

Laws applied
- 8 U.S.C. § 1227; 18 U.S.C. § 16

Leocal v. Ashcroft, 543 U.S. 1 (2004), held that aliens may not be deported after being convicted of DUI if the DUI statute that defines the offense does not contain a mens rea element or otherwise allows a conviction for merely negligent conduct.

== Facts ==
Josue Leocal is a citizen of Haiti who has been a lawful permanent resident of the United States since 1987. In 2000, he was convicted in Florida of driving under the influence (DUI). Proceedings were then instituted to deport Leocal, and an immigration judge concluded that Leocal's DUI conviction constituted a "crime of violence" and hence an aggravated felony under the Immigration and Nationality Act. Because of his conviction for an aggravated felony, Leocal was ordered deported in October 2001. The Board of Immigration Appeals affirmed this decision, and Leocal sought review in the Eleventh Circuit. In an unpublished opinion, the Eleventh Circuit concluded that the DUI conviction was an "aggravated felony," and hence it had no jurisdiction to review the lawfulness of the deportation order. The U.S. Supreme Court agreed to review the case.

== Opinion of the Court ==
Under the Immigration and Nationality Act, any alien convicted of an aggravated felony is deportable and may be deported upon an order of the Attorney General. An "aggravated felony" includes any crime classified under federal law as a "crime of violence." And a "crime of violence," in turn, is any crime that

(a) has as an element the use, attempted use, or threatened use of physical force against the person or property of another, or (b) is a felony and that, by its nature, involves a substantial risk that physical force against the person or property of another may be used in the course of committing the offense.

In order to determine whether Leocal's DUI conviction qualified as a "crime of violence," the Court examined the elements of the statutory definition of the crime rather than the particular facts.

Under Florida law, it is a third-degree felony for any person to operate a vehicle under the influence and, "by reason of such operation, caus[e] ... [s]erious bodily injury to another." This statute has no mens rea element—it does not require the defendant to have any particular level of intent to commit the crime. In Florida, DUI does not entail the attempted or threatened use of physical force; if DUI is to qualify as a crime of violence, it must so qualify because it involves the use of physical force. The "use" of physical force "most naturally suggests a higher degree of intent than negligent or merely accidental conduct." Likewise, DUI does not entail a "substantial risk" that physical force will be used. Furthermore, the fact that in another subsection of the Immigration and Nationality Act, Congress expressly distinguished between DUI crimes and "crimes of violence" bolstered the Court's conclusion that Florida's DUI statute was not a "crime of violence" because it did not require proof of any particular mental state, and thus criminalized merely negligent conduct.

== See also ==
- Begay v. United States
