= Chambers v. United States =

- Supreme Court of the United States

Argued November 10, 2008 Decided January 13, 2009
- Full case name: Deondery Chambers, Petitioner v. United States
- Docket no.: 06-11206
- Citations: 555 U.S. 122 (more) 129 S. Ct. 687; 172 L. Ed. 2d 484; 2009 U.S. LEXIS 580

Case history
- Prior: United States v. Chambers, 473 F.3d 724 (7th Cir. 2007); cert. granted, 553 U.S. 1003 (2008).

Holding
- Failing to report for incarceration does not qualify as a "violent felony" for the purposes of the Armed Career Criminal Act.

Court membership
- Chief Justice John Roberts Associate Justices John P. Stevens · Antonin Scalia; Anthony Kennedy · David Souter; Clarence Thomas · Ruth Bader Ginsburg; Stephen Breyer · Samuel Alito

Case opinions
- Majority: Breyer, joined by Roberts, Stevens, Scalia, Kennedy, Souter, Ginsburg
- Concurrence: Alito, joined by Thomas

Laws applied
- Armed Career Criminal Act (18 U.S.C. §§ 924–e)

Chambers v. United States, 555 U.S. 122 (2009), was a case in which the Supreme Court of the United States held that failing to report for incarceration does not qualify as a "violent felony" for the purposes of the Armed Career Criminal Act.

== Background ==
The Armed Career Criminal Act, enacted in 1984 and since amended, provides for enhanced sentences for felons who commit crimes with firearms. A felon convicted of a "violent felony" or a "serious drug offense" at least three times faces a minimum sentence of fifteen years in prison.

The petitioner, Deondery Chambers, pleaded guilty in District Court to the charge of being a felon in unlawful possession of a firearm. The prosecution sought to invoke the ACCA's mandatory 15-year prison term on the grounds that Chambers had three prior convictions which qualified: robbery and aggravated battery (1998), a drug conviction (1999), a failure to report for incarceration charge stemming from the robbery and battery conviction. The court had required Chambers to report to a local prison for 11 weekends of incarceration; Chambers missed four of the weekends and was convicted under Illinois law for "fail[ing] to report to a penal institution."

Chambers challenged the failure to report, arguing that it was not a "violent felony." The District Court disagreed, treating the failure to report as similar to an escape and therefore a violent felony under the ACCA. The United States Court of Appeals for the Seventh Circuit upheld the District Court. Other Courts of Appeal had come to differing conclusions: the First Circuit agreed that failure to report qualified as a violent felony in United States v. Winn (2001), while the Ninth Circuit held that it did not in United States v. Piccolo (2006). The Supreme Court granted certiorari to resolve the split.

== Opinion of the Court ==
Robert Hochman argued the case for the petitioner. Assistant to the Solicitor General Matthew D. Roberts argued for the respondent. Roberts argued that "failure-to-report escape is similar in kind to burglary because it's purposeful, violent, and aggressive in the same way as burglary." Roberts argued that failure to report is an invitation for a violent confrontation between the police and the felon.

The Supreme Court held unanimously that a failure to report did not qualify as a violent felony for the purposes of the Armed Career Criminal Act. Justice Breyer wrote the majority opinion which six other justices joined, while Justice Alito wrote a concurrence which Justice Thomas joined.
