= Armed Career Criminal Act =

1984 United States federal law

Armed Career Criminal Act of 1984
- Acronyms (colloquial): ACCA
- Nicknames: Armed Career Criminal Act
- Enacted by: the 98th United States Congress
- Effective: October 12, 1984

Citations
- Public law: 98-473
- Statutes at Large: 98 Stat. 2185

Codification
- Acts amended: Omnibus Crime Control and Safe Streets Act of 1968
- Titles amended: 18 U.S.C.: Crimes and Criminal Procedure
- U.S.C. sections amended: 18 U.S.C. App. § 1202(a)

Legislative history
- Signed into law by President Ronald Reagan on October 12, 1984

Major amendments
- Firearm Owners Protection Act, Pub. L. 99-308, § 104(a)(4), 100 Stat. 456.; Career Criminals Amendment Act of 1986, Pub. L. 99-570, § 1402, 100 Stat. 3207-39.; Crime Control Act of 1990, Pub. L. 101-647, § 3529, 104 Stat. 4924.; Violent Crime Control and Law Enforcement Act, Pub. L. 103-322.; 21st Century DOJ Appropriations Authorization Act, Pub. L. 107-273, § 4002(d)(1)(E), 116 Stat. 1809.

United States Supreme Court cases
- List: Taylor v. United States, 495 U.S. 575 (1990); Custis v. United States, 511 U.S. 485 (1994); Daniels v. United States, 532 U.S. 374 (2001); Shepard v. United States, 544 U.S. 13 (2005); James v. United States, 550 U.S. 192 (2007); Logan v. United States, 552 U.S. 23 (2007); Begay v. United States, 553 U.S. 137 (2008); United States v. Rodriquez, 553 U.S. 377 (2008); Chambers v. United States, 555 U.S. 122 (2009); Johnson v. United States, 559 U.S. 133 (2010); Abbott v. United States, 562 U.S. 8 (2010); McNeill v. United States, 563 U.S. 816 (2011); Sykes v. United States, 564 U.S. 1 (2011); Descamps v. United States, 570 U.S. 254 (2013); Johnson v. United States, 576 U.S. 591 (2015); Welch v. United States, 578 U.S. 120 (2016); Mathis v. United States, 579 U.S. 500 (2016); United States v. Stitt, 586 U.S. 27 (2017); Stokeling v. United States, 586 U.S. 73 (2019); Quarles v. United States, 587 U.S. 407 (2019); United States v. Davis, 588 U.S. 445 (2019); Shular v. United States, 589 U.S. 154 (2020); Borden v. United States, 593 U.S. 420 (2021); Wooden v. United States, 595 U.S. 360 (2022); Brown v. United States, 602 U.S. 101 (2024); Erlinger v. United States, 602 U.S. 821 (2024)

The Armed Career Criminal Act of 1984 (ACCA) is a United States federal law that provides sentence enhancements for felons who commit crimes with firearms if they are convicted of certain crimes three or more times. Pennsylvania senator Arlen Specter was a key proponent for the legislation.

If a felon has three or more prior convictions for offenses that are "violent felony" offenses or "serious drug offenses," the Act provides a minimum sentence of fifteen years imprisonment, instead of the fifteen-year maximum prescribed under the Gun Control Act. The Act provides for an implied maximum sentence of life imprisonment.

== History of ACCA ==
The ACCA has been through numerous revisions in Congress and has evolved considerably since its passage in 1984.

The ACCA was originally included with the Comprehensive Crime Control Act of 1984 sponsored by the Reagan Administration and enhanced the penalties for possession of firearms under the Gun Control Act for felons who had been convicted three times of robbery or burglary.

== Cases involving the ACCA ==
The definition of "violent felony" in ACCA has been interpreted by the Supreme Court in Begay v. United States and Chambers v. United States, which determined that neither drunk driving nor failure to report for incarceration were considered violent felonies, respectively. The Supreme Court ruled in Stokeling v. United States (Docket 17-5554) in January 2019 that criminal acts like pick pocketing and purse snatching should only be considered violent felonies if the perpetrator employed more force than is necessary to remove the property from that person. The Government further stated that, “slight offensive touching” would not satisfy the Florida robbery statute. Therefore, not all incidents of pick pocketing or snatching are automatically considered robbery offenses under the Florida statute which includes provisions for lesser theft crimes.

The definition of a "serious" drug crime was considered and further defined by the Supreme Court in United States v. Rodriquez. In Taylor v. United States, the Court was called upon to determine the meaning of the word "burglary" in ACCA and, specifically, whether a conviction in Missouri for second-degree burglary was, in fact, a predicate conviction. The court concluded that an offense constitutes "burglary" under 924(e) if, regardless of its exact definition or label, it has the basic elements of burglary.

On June 26, 2015, the Supreme Court of the United States ruled in Johnson v. United States that part of the ACCA is unconstitutional. The Court struck down a "catchall phrase" (also known as a residual clause) in the ACCA that was described as "vague" in outlining acts that could result in a harsher sentence. "Under the Armed Career Criminal Act of 1984, a defendant convicted of being a felon in possession of a firearm faces more severe punishment if he has three or more previous convictions for a 'violent felony,' a term defined to include any felony that 'involves conduct that presents a serious potential risk of physical injury to another.' 18 U. S. C. §924(e)(2)(B). We must decide whether this part of the definition of a violent felony survives the Constitution’s prohibition of vague criminal laws...We hold that imposing an increased sentence under the residual clause of the Armed Career Criminal Act violates the Constitution’s guarantee of due process. Our contrary holdings in James and Sykes are overruled. Today’s decision does not call into question application of the Act to the four enumerated offenses, or the remainder of the Act’s definition of a violent felony."

In Borden v. United States (2021), the Supreme Court ruled that previous crimes with a mens rea of recklessness do not qualify as violent felonies for the purposes of the ACCA.

In Wooden v. United States (2022), the Supreme Court ruled that for purposes of considering the enhanced sentences, multiple convictions arising from crimes committed at the same "occasion" are considered to be a single criminal episode toward the three-strikes rule.
