= Rule of lenity =

Principle of statutory interpretation

The rule of lenity, also called the rule of strict construction, is a principle in criminal law that requires a court to interpret an ambiguous or unclear criminal statute in the way that is most favorable to the defendant. The rule has a long history in the English and American common law tradition and has been an important element of the relationship between the courts and the legislature, but its role in modern jurisprudence is less clear.

== Overview ==
Today, determining legislative intent is a critical job that arises from the distinct and separate roles played by the judiciary and the legislature in administering justice. Judges are routinely required to apply the relevant laws and rules passed by the legislature to the decisions they make. There are reasons this can be difficult.

For one, laws are intended to apply generally and it would be impossible for the legislature to foresee all the possible situations to which they might apply after their enactment.

For the purpose of resolving this issue, courts have developed canons of interpretation. The rule of lenity is one such canon. Implicit in its provisions is the additional burden placed on the prosecution in a criminal case and the protection of individual rights against the powers of the state. It also furthers the fundamental principle of requiring notice in criminal law. Individuals should not be punished for their acts when the law fails to communicate to the public that such acts are forbidden.

It is intended to apply only to those instances where the court recognizes the existence of more than one interpretation and where the decision that the court reaches harms or benefits the defendant to some greater or lesser degree. In that case, the rule requires the court to select the interpretation most beneficial (or least detrimental) to the defendant.

== History ==
The traditional rule, also called the rule of strict construction, arose in the English common law for a purpose very different from those cited in U.S. law.

=== English common law ===
Originally, the rule was conceived by English judges trying to limit Parliament's use of the death penalty. When the facts of a case were not expressly described by a law, the court would "strictly construe" it so as to exclude its application to the case in question.

A 1547, a law passed that denied a lesser sentence to first-time offenders convicted of "felonious stealing of Horses, Geldings or Mares" among other offenses. The courts interpreted the law as applying to only those convicted of stealing two or more horses and allowed first-offenders who stole one horse to continue to avail themselves of the lesser penalty. The following year, Parliament explicitly addressed the rule's use with the passage of a new law, solely dedicated to horse thievery. They pointed to the prior law's "ambiguous" wording and its construction by the courts. The new law explicitly stated that those convicted of stealing "any Horse, Gelding, or Mare" shall be treated the same as those charged with "stealing two Horses, two Geldings, or two Mares, or any other".

Under the reign of George II, another law concerning first-offenders and livestock was similarly limited by the courts. This time, the act ambiguously referred to "Sheep, or other Cattle". The following year, Parliament passed a new "Act to Explain An Act" in which they expressly spelled out that the statute should apply to "any Bull, Cow, Ox, Steer, Bullock, Heifer, Calf [or] Lamb, [or] Sheep, and to no other Cattle whatsoever".

=== Early American law ===
Laying out the rule's application in the American courts, it was first cited in 1820 by Chief Justice John Marshall in United States v. Wiltberger:

The rule that penal laws are to be construed strictly, is perhaps not much less old than construction itself. It is founded on the tenderness of the law for the rights of individuals; and on the plain principle, that the power of punishment is vested in the legislative, not in the judicial department.

....

[T]hough penal laws are to be construed strictly, they are not to be construed so strictly as to defeat the obvious intention of the legislature. The maxim is not to be so applied as to narrow the words of the statute ... in their ordinary acceptation, or in which the legislature has obviously used them. ... The intention of the legislature is to be collected from the words they employ. Where there is no ambiguity in the words, there is no room for construction.

=== 20th century ===
After its initial wide acceptance, other canons, such as the clear statement rule and the vagueness doctrine, have encroached on the rule and its use by the courts. In 1961, Justice Frankfurter wrote in Callanan v. United States, that the rule is for expressing the will of Congress, not protecting defendants from it:

The rule of lenity [is] for resolving an ambiguity, not [creating one]. ... The rule comes into operation at the end of the process of interpreting what Congress has expressed, not at the beginning as an overriding consideration of being lenient to wrongdoers.

== Islamic law ==
Islamic law has a similar tenet which allows the imposition of punishments only in the absence of "doubt or ambiguity".

== Modern status in US ==
The rule is today seen as an expression of legislative supremacy. It is infrequently cited in contemporary opinions.

During oral arguments for the 2016 case Lockhart v. United States, Justice Antonin Scalia sua sponte raised the question of the rule's application:

... what I worry about is the rule of lenity. You have these dueling canons, and you have a rule that when the government sends somebody to jail for 10 years, it has to cross sharp corners. It has to dot every i and cross every t. It has to be clear!

In the end, he joined the majority in refusing to apply the rule.

In State v. Thonesavanh, The Minnesota Supreme Court expressly rejected the position that the rule "allows a defendant to prevail in every instance in which a criminal statute is ambiguous". At issue was the question of whether the word "take", as used in the state's law against auto theft, required the accused to actually move the vehicle, or, as in this case, merely to enter it and lock the doors. The court relied on the doctrine of in pari materia in holding that the mere "temporary control" of the car was enough under the statue.

On the other hand, the Massachusetts Supreme Judicial Court cited the rule in Commonwealth v. Dayton in ruling that the ambiguous language in the state's OUI law did not permit suspects to be held without bail unless they had been convicted three times under the statute, as opposed to being arrested three times.

=== State codification ===
The states of Florida and Ohio have codified the rule. The Florida statute states that the code "shall be strictly construed; when the language is susceptible of differing constructions, it shall be construed most favorably to the accused." The Ohio law states simply that offenses and penalties shall be "strictly construed against the state and liberally construed in favor of the accused".

== See also ==
- Ex post facto law
- Vagueness doctrine
- Contra proferentem – For civil law
