= Apprendi v. New Jersey =

- Supreme Court of the United States

Argued March 28, 2000 Decided June 26, 2000
- Full case name: Charles C. Apprendi, Jr. v. New Jersey
- Citations: 530 U.S. 466 (more) 120 S. Ct. 2348; 147 L. Ed. 2d 435; 2000 U.S. LEXIS 4304; 68 U.S.L.W. 4576; 2000 Cal. Daily Op. Service 5061; 2000 Daily Journal DAR 6749; 2000 Colo. J. C.A.R. 3722; 13 Fla. L. Weekly Fed. S 457

Case history
- Prior: Defendant sentenced after plea agreement, Superior Ct. of New Jersey, Law Div., Cumberland Cty., 1995; affirmed, 698 A.2d 1265 (N.J. Super. Ct. App. Div. 1997); affirmed, 731 A.2d 485 (N.J. 1999); cert. granted, 528 U.S. 1018 (1998).

Holding
- Other than the fact of a prior conviction, every fact necessary to authorize a defendant's punishment must be either admitted by the defendant or found by a jury on proof beyond a reasonable doubt. The New Jersey Hate Crime Statute was an unconstitutional violation of the Sixth Amendment right to a jury trial because it allowed a judge to increase a criminal sentence beyond its statutory maximum based on his own finding of an aggravating factor by a preponderance of the evidence. New Jersey Supreme Court reversed and remanded.

Court membership
- Chief Justice William Rehnquist Associate Justices John P. Stevens · Sandra Day O'Connor; Antonin Scalia · Anthony Kennedy; David Souter · Clarence Thomas; Ruth Bader Ginsburg · Stephen Breyer

Case opinions
- Majority: Stevens, joined by Scalia, Souter, Thomas, Ginsburg
- Concurrence: Scalia
- Concurrence: Thomas, joined by Scalia (parts I, II)
- Dissent: O'Connor, joined by Rehnquist, Kennedy, Breyer
- Dissent: Breyer, joined by Rehnquist

Laws applied
- U.S. Const. amend. VI;^{a} N.J. Stat. Ann. § 2C:44-3(e) (New Jersey Hate Crime Statute)

Apprendi v. New Jersey, 530 U.S. 466 (2000), is a landmark United States Supreme Court decision with regard to aggravating factors in crimes. The Court ruled that the Sixth Amendment right to a jury trial, incorporated against the states through the Fourteenth Amendment, prohibited judges from enhancing criminal sentences beyond statutory maxima based on facts other than those decided by the jury beyond a reasonable doubt. The decision has been a cornerstone in the modern resurgence in jury trial rights. As Justice Scalia noted in his concurring opinion, the jury-trial right "has never been efficient; but it has always been free."

The Apprendi decision was subsequently cited as precedent by the court in its consideration of Ring v. Arizona (2002), which struck down Arizona's judge-only method of imposing the death penalty, and also in Blakely v. Washington (2004), which ruled that mandatory state sentencing guidelines are the statutory maximum for purposes of applying the Apprendi rule.

== Background ==
In the early morning hours of December 22, 1994, Charles Apprendi Jr., fired several .22-caliber bullets into the home of an African-American family that had recently moved into his neighborhood. He was arrested an hour later. During questioning by police, he admitted that he shot at the house because its occupants were "black in color" and for that reason he did not "want them in the neighborhood."

Later, Apprendi pleaded guilty to weapons possession charges. Each of these counts carried a sentence of between 5 and 10 years in prison. As part of the plea bargain, the prosecution reserved the right to seek an enhanced sentence on the basis that the crime was committed with a biased purpose. Such an enhancement would have doubled the sentence otherwise imposed for each of the crimes. Apprendi, in turn, reserved the right to challenge the bias crime enhancement, claiming it violated the federal Constitution.

The trial judge accepted Apprendi's plea. At a later hearing, he heard testimony from Apprendi himself as well as from psychologists stating that the shooting was not motivated by racial hatred but instead was the result of intoxication. The policeman testified at this hearing that Apprendi's motivation was racial animus. The trial judge found "by a preponderance of the evidence" that Apprendi's crime was motivated by the race of the victims. He sentenced Apprendi to 12 years in prison—2 years above the maximum sentence authorized for the weapons charge apart from the race enhancement.

Apprendi appealed, represented by Charles Coant and Joseph O'Neill. The Appellate Division of the New Jersey Superior Court affirmed the enhancement on the grounds that it was a "sentencing factor" rather than an "element" of the crime, and therefore not subject to the jury-trial and proof-beyond-a-reasonable-doubt requirements of the Constitution. The New Jersey Supreme Court agreed with this conclusion, and also affirmed Apprendi's sentence. Apprendi appealed to the Supreme Court.

== Opinion of the Court ==
Apprendi shifted the landscape with regard to the findings that comprise a criminal sentence. "Other than the fact of a prior conviction, any fact that increases the penalty for a crime beyond the prescribed statutory maximum must be submitted to a jury and proved beyond a reasonable doubt." In this case, the hate-crime enhancement was determined by a judge, sitting alone, and subjected to a lower standard of proof — a preponderance of the evidence, instead of beyond a reasonable doubt. Because of the enhancement, the judge imposed a 12-year sentence, which was 2 years greater than the 10-year sentence otherwise authorized by the findings at the plea hearing. Under the rule the Court formulated, Apprendi's case had to be sent back to the New Jersey courts.

=== Historical basis ===
Oliver Wendell Holmes observed, "The law threatens certain pains if you do certain things, intending thereby to give you a new motive for not doing them. If you persist in doing them, it has to inflict the pains in order that its threats may continue to be believed." Here, New Jersey threatened punishment for infractions against its firearms laws, and additional punishment for violations of its hate-crimes laws. Due process procedural safeguards should apply equally to both of these punishments.

Under the Constitution, due process gives criminal defendants two interdependent procedural safeguards with respect to the manner in which the sentence is determined. The first of these is the jury trial, a "guard against a spirit of oppression and tyranny on the part of the rulers" and "the great bulwark of our civil and political liberties," whereby "the truth of every accusation, whether preferred in the shape of indictment, information, or appeal, should afterwards be confirmed by the unanimous suffrage of twelve of the defendant's equals and neighbors." The second is proof beyond a reasonable doubt, the historical "measure of persuasion by which the prosecution must convince the trier of all the essential elements of guilt." There was historically no distinction between an "element" of a crime and a "sentencing factor" because the trial judge had very little discretion at sentencing, because most crimes had a specific sentence attached to them.

Justice Thomas explained how the original understanding of the jury-trial requirement supported the Court's ruling. He also argued that the jury-trial requirement applied to both mandatory minimum sentences and the findings of prior convictions used to enhance sentences. To make this argument, Justice Thomas had to repudiate his prior support for the prior conviction exception crafted in Almendarez-Torres v. United States, 523 U.S. 224 (1998). "What matters is the way by which a fact enters into the sentence." Even though a prior conviction may be valid because it entailed its own jury trial, the fact that that prior conviction was being used to enhance a new sentence meant that that fact must be submitted to a jury again.

=== 20th-century developments ===
In Williams v. New York, 337 U.S. 241 (1949), the Court affirmed that a sentencing judge has discretion to impose any sentence authorized by statute in an individual case. This statement accommodated a shift in the way legislatures had set punishments between the 18th and 20th centuries — a shift away from fixed punishments and toward broader and broader ranges of punishment. This was not to say that "trial practices cannot change in the course of centuries and still remain true to the principles that emerged from the Framers' fears that the jury right could be lost not only by gross denial, but by erosion." Nevertheless, practice should at least adhere to basic principles, even as that practice evolves over the course of time.

With the decision in In re Winship in 1970, the Court expressly said for the first time that due process demands from the government proof beyond a reasonable doubt of every element of a crime. Thus, the Court held that a state court could not force a defendant to prove he did not act with malice aforethought in order to avoid a murder conviction, as in Mullaney v. Wilbur, 421 U.S. 684 (1975). Criminal law "is concerned not only with guilt or innocence in the abstract, but also with the degree of criminal culpability assessed" in the defendant. Thus, redefining the elements of murder to make the level of intent required bear on punishment was not an appropriate method for avoiding the reasonable-doubt requirement of the Constitution.

It was not until 1986, in McMillan v. Pennsylvania, 477 U.S. 79 (1986), that the Court first coined the term "sentencing factor." A "sentencing factor" is a fact not found by a jury that nevertheless affected the sentence imposed by a judge. In McMillan, a state statute required a 5-year minimum sentence for anyone who visibly possessed a firearm during certain crimes. Imposing a mandatory minimum sentence based on this factual finding did not violate the reasonable-doubt requirement because it merely limited the discretion of the sentencing court rather than increased the maximum sentence available to the judge by virtue of the finding.

=== Sentencing enhancements and the reasonable-doubt requirement ===
The hate-crime sentencing enhancement at issue in this case was a ratchet — it exposed Apprendi to greater punishment by virtue of an additional fact which was not a component of the firearms violation that exposed him to any criminal liability at all. Thus, in order to apply the historical procedural safeguards in the novel context of sentencing enhancements, the Court had to extend these protections to those new enhancements.

Because the hate-crime enhancement increased the punishment available to the sentencing judge instead of raising the floor on the sentencing range as a mandatory minimum would, the Court would not allow the hate-crime enhancement to escape the constitutional protections. The reason for criminal activity requires an inquiry into the defendant's motive, a traditional arena of criminal examination. Punishing a person for this specific bad intent has historically been the province of the criminal law, and historically required certain procedural safeguards. Merely labelling the hate-crime enhancement as a "sentencing factor" could not allow New Jersey to escape constitutional requirements.

=== Preservation of the recidivism exception ===
Two years before Apprendi, the Court decided Almendarez-Torres v. United States, 523 U.S. 224 (1998), in which the Court held that a federal statute authorizing increased punishment for illegally reentering the United States after deportation pursuant to a conviction for certain crimes was constitutional despite a then-emerging view (later solidified in Apprendi) that facts that increased punishment must be proved to a jury beyond a reasonable doubt. In Apprendi, the Court acknowledged that Almendarez-Torres might conflict with the blanket rule it was adopting in that case. However, the Court allowed sentencing enhancements for prior convictions to stand because those prior convictions had already been subject to the jury-trial and reasonable-doubt requirements.

=== Dissents ===
Justice O'Connor began with the argument that rather than allowing the Constitution to dictate what elements of crimes are, the Court usually deferred to the legislature's definition of the elements that constitute a crime. She also disputed that the historical evidence cited by the majority dictated the result it reached. The fact that common-law judges may have had little discretion in imposing sentence had little bearing for her on modern sentencing schemes.

Furthermore, Justice O'Connor disputed that the Court's modern cases dictated the result. Although the Court in Mullaney v. Wilbur, 421 U.S. 684 (1975), may have ruled that the jury-trial and reasonable-doubt requirements applied to the facts that dictated the degree of homicide crime the defendant had committed, and thus the level of punishment to which he was subject, two years later, in Patterson v. New York, 432 U.S. 197 (1977), the Court ruled that a state could place on defendants the burden of proving affirmative defenses, such as extreme emotional disturbance. Patterson, for Justice O'Connor, repudiated the general principle that facts bearing on the degree of punishment must be proved to a jury beyond a reasonable doubt. Also, McMillan v. Pennsylvania, 477 U.S. 79 (1986), was not relevant to the Court's rule because McMillan involved a mandatory minimum punishment, rather than a maximum sentence.

Finally, Justice O'Connor warned that the Court's decision did not square with Walton v. Arizona, 479 U.S. 639 (1990), in which the Court had ruled that the jury-trial requirement expressly did not apply to the aggravating factors required under Arizona law to impose a death sentence. As Justice O'Connor observed, a judge in Arizona could not impose a death sentence without a finding that one of the aggravating factors applied. Under the rule the majority adopted, that finding would have to be made by a jury, yet O'Connor found the majority's attempt to distinguish Arizona's death penalty to be "baffling." Two years later, in Ring v. Arizona, 536 U.S. 584 (2002), Justice O'Connor's view about Arizona's death penalty scheme would prevail. O'Connor also predicted that the Apprendi decision would give rise to serious constitutional doubt in the federal sentencing scheme. In 2005's United States v. Booker, 543 U.S. 220 (2005), this prediction also came to pass.

Justice Breyer complained that the "real world of criminal justice" would not be able to meet the "ideal" of submitting to juries facts that subject criminal defendants to increased punishments. Fixing certain punishments for all defendants convicted of the same offense would ignore specific harms committed by different defendants as well as certain characteristics of individual defendants. "There are, to put it simply, far too many relevant sentencing factors to permit submission of all (or even many) of them to a jury." Because this was a premise upon which the Federal Sentencing Guidelines rested, Justice Breyer dissented from the majority's opinion.

=== Subsequent cases ===
In Southern Union Co. v. United States (2012), the Supreme Court determined that when a criminal fine is sufficient to trigger the Sixth Amendment jury-trial guarantee, facts that would increase the penalty beyond the statutory maximum must be submitted to a jury and proved beyond a reasonable doubt.

Respondent was convicted of storing hazardous liquid mercury without a permit, "on or about September 19, 2002 to October 19, 2004," in violation of the Resource Conservation and Recovery Act (42 U.S.C. § 6901 et seq.). The jury was not asked to determine the exact duration of the violation. In sentencing, the probation office set a maximum fine of $38.1 million, calculated by assessing the $50,000 maximum daily fine for each of the 762 days between September 19, 2002, and October 19, 2004. Respondent appealed on the basis that the jury never determined the exact duration of the violation. The Court of Appeals for the First Circuit upheld the sentence, agreeing that the jury had not determined the duration of the violation, but holding that Apprendi did not apply to criminal fines.

The Supreme Court reversed, holding there is no principled distinction between criminal fines and imprisonment for the purpose of Apprendi because Apprendi requires that any fact other than a prior conviction that increases the penalty for a crime beyond the statutory maximum must be submitted to the jury and determined beyond a reasonable doubt. The rule preserves the historic fact-finding function of the jury. Where a fine is sufficiently substantial to trigger the Sixth Amendment jury-trial guarantee, Apprendi applies.

In Alleyne v. United States (2013), the Court ruled that all facts that increase a mandatory minimum must be submitted to and proven by a jury. In this ruling, the court explicitly overruled Harris v. United States (2002), which had held that such facts did not need to be submitted to a jury.

== Footnotes ==
*^a As applied to the states through the Fourteenth Amendment; see Incorporation.
