= United States v. Davis (2019) =

- Supreme Court of the United States

Argued April 17, 2019 Decided June 24, 2019
- Full case name: United States, Petitioner v. Maurice Lamont Davis and Andre Levon Glover
- Docket no.: 18-431
- Citations: 588 U.S. 445 (more) 139 S. Ct. 2319; 204 L. Ed. 2d 757
- Argument: Oral argument
- Decision: Opinion

Case history
- Prior: Convictions affirmed, United States v. Davis, 677 F. App'x 933 (5th Cir. 2017); Cert. granted, judgment vacated, Davis v. United States, 138 S. Ct. 1979 (2018); Convictions affirmed on remand, United States v. Davis, 903 F.3d 483 (5th Cir. 2018);
- Subsequent: On remand, United States v. Davis, 784 F. App'x 277 (5th Cir. 2019).

Holding
- A statute authorizing enhanced penalties for using a firearm during the commission of a "crime of violence" is unconstitutionally vague.

Court membership
- Chief Justice John Roberts Associate Justices Clarence Thomas · Ruth Bader Ginsburg; Stephen Breyer · Samuel Alito; Sonia Sotomayor · Elena Kagan; Neil Gorsuch · Brett Kavanaugh

Case opinions
- Majority: Gorsuch, joined by Ginsburg, Breyer, Sotomayor, Kagan
- Dissent: Kavanaugh, joined by Thomas, Alito; Roberts (all but Part II–C)

Laws applied
- 18 U.S.C. § 924(c)(3)(B)

United States v. Davis, 588 U.S. 445 (2019), is a United States Supreme Court decision in which the court held that a statute authorizing enhanced penalties for using a firearm during the commission of a "crime of violence" is unconstitutionally vague.

== Background ==
On November 19, 2015, a jury found defendant Maurice Lamont Davis guilty on six counts, including the illegal use or carrying of a firearm in relation to a crime of violence (a “Hobbs Act robbery”) and the illegal use or carrying of a firearm to aid and abet conspiracy to commit a crime of violence. Also on November 19, 2015, a jury found defendant Andre Levon Glover guilty on seven counts, including the two counts described above.

On appeal, the United States Court of Appeals for the Fifth Circuit issued an opinion on January 31, 2017, denying both defendants’ challenges and affirming the district court’s judgment below. The defendants petitioned the US Supreme Court for certiorari, and following the Court’s decision in Sessions v. Dimaya, the Court remanded their case back to the Fifth Circuit for further consideration in light of that decision. After requesting supplemental briefing from the parties on the effect of Dimaya, the Fifth Circuit affirmed in part and vacated in part.

== Judgment ==
Affirmed in part, vacated in part, and remanded, 5–4, in an opinion by Justice Gorsuch on June 24, 2019. Justice Kavanaugh filed a dissenting opinion, in which Justices Thomas and Alito joined, and in which Chief Justice Roberts joined as to all but Part II–C.

=== Legal principles ===
18 U.S.C. § 924(c) contains both an “elements clause” and a “residual clause.” The elements clause defines an offense as a crime of violence if it “has as an element the use, attempted use, or threatened use of physical force against the person or property of another,” and the residual clause defines an offense as a crime of violence if it, “by its nature, involves a substantial risk that physical force against the person or property of another may be used in the course of committing the offense.” In Dimaya, the Court addressed (and invalidated) a residual clause identical to the residual clause in § 924(c) but did not address the elements clause. Thus, the Fifth Circuit held the residual clause in 924(c) unconstitutionally vague under Dimaya but did not invalidate the elements clause in that section. As a result of this holding, the Fifth Circuit affirmed its prior judgment as to the Hobbs Act robbery count but vacated as to the aiding and abetting conspiracy count, because the former relies on the elements clause while the latter relies on the residual clause.
