= Jones v. United States (1999) =

- Supreme Court of the United States

Argued October 5, 1998 Decided March 24, 1999
- Full case name: Nathaniel Jones v. United States of America
- Citations: 526 U.S. 227 (more) 119 S. Ct. 1215; 143 L. Ed. 2d 311

Case history
- Prior: Conviction and sentence affirmed by the Ninth Circuit, 116 F.3d 1487 (9th Cir. 1997); cert. granted, 523 U.S. 1045 (1998).

Holding
- The three subsections of the federal carjacking statute create three distinct criminal offenses that are subject to the Sixth Amendment jury trial requirement.

Court membership
- Chief Justice William Rehnquist Associate Justices John P. Stevens · Sandra Day O'Connor; Antonin Scalia · Anthony Kennedy; David Souter · Clarence Thomas; Ruth Bader Ginsburg · Stephen Breyer

Case opinions
- Majority: Souter, joined by Stevens, Scalia, Thomas, Ginsburg
- Concurrence: Stevens
- Concurrence: Scalia
- Dissent: Kennedy, joined by Rehnquist, O'Connor, Breyer

Laws applied
- U.S. Const. amend. VI; 18 U.S.C. § 2119

Jones v. United States, 526 U.S. 227 (1999), is a United States Supreme Court case interpreting the federal carjacking statute, 18 U.S.C. § 2119, to set forth three distinct crimes, each with distinct elements. The Court drew this conclusion from the structure of the statute, under which two subsections provided for additional punishment if the defendant inflicts more serious harm. The Court also distinguished Almendarez-Torres v. United States, 523 U.S. 224 (1998), because that case allowed for sentencing enhancement based on a prior conviction.

== Facts ==
Jones and two accomplices, Oliver and McMillan, held up two men. Jones and McMillan took the victims' money. Oliver beat one of the men with a gun. Oliver and McMillan left the scene in Jones's car, while Jones forced the other man into a car and drove off in it. Jones stopped to put the man out, then sped off again, chased this time by the police. Jones then crashed into a telephone pole, ending the chase.

Jones was indicted in the United States District Court for the Eastern District of California for violating the federal carjacking statute, 18 U.S.C. § 2119. The indictment did not name the particular subsection Jones was accused of violating. The magistrate judge informed Jones he faced a maximum sentence of 15 years, the smallest maximum sentence under the statute's three subsections. The trial judge instructed the jury under that subsection, which did not require proof of the fact or the extent of the victim's injuries. Jones was convicted of the carjacking count.

A presentence investigation report recommended that Jones receive a 25-year sentence because one of the victims had suffered "serious bodily injury". Jones objected that this sentence was not authorized because the serious bodily injury component was not charged in the indictment. The district court overruled this objection, found that there had been serious bodily injury by a preponderance of the evidence, and imposed a 25-year sentence. On appeal, the Ninth Circuit took the view that the enhanced provisions were merely sentencing factors that did not need to be set forth in the indictment or submitted to the jury. It therefore affirmed this aspect of Jones's conviction. The U.S. Supreme Court then agreed to review the case.

== Majority opinion ==
The federal carjacking statute, 18 U.S.C. § 2119, reads:

Whoever, possessing a firearm as defined in section 921 of [Title 18], takes a motor vehicle that has been transported, shipped, or received in interstate or foreign commerce from the person or presence of another by force and violence or by intimidation, or attempts to do so, shall—

1. be fined under this title or imprisoned not more than 15 years, or both,
2. if serious bodily injury (as defined in section 1365 of [Title 18]) results, be fined under this title or imprisoned not more than 25 years, or both, and
3. if death results, be fined under this title or be imprisoned for any number of years up to life, or both.

The Court ultimately held that the additional elements specified in subsections (2) and (3)—serious bodily injury and death—were elements of greater crimes that had to be charged in the indictment, submitted to the jury, and proved beyond a reasonable doubt.

The Court has never defined what makes a certain fact an "element" subject to the Sixth Amendment jury-trial requirement, as opposed to a mere "sentencing factor" not subject to the requirement. And the Court began by conceding that "at first glance" the three subsections were mere sentencing factors. Yet "countervailing structural considerations" led the Court to conclude that the additional facts in subsections (2) and (3) were in fact elements of two greater crimes.

Reading the text closely, the Court observed that, since none of the numbered subsections can stand by itself as defining a crime, neither can the first paragraph. "In isolation, it would merely describe some very obnoxious behavior, leaving any reader assuming that it must be a crime, but never being actually told that it is. Only the numbered subsidiary provisions complete the thought." Even so, such a close reading of the statutory text only helps to infer congressional intent. "If a given statute is unclear about treating... a fact as element or penalty aggravator, it makes sense to look at what other statutes have done, on the fair assumption that Congress is unlikely to intend any radical departures from past practice without making a point of saying so."

In Almendarez-Torres v. United States, 523 U.S. 224 (1998), Congress's nearly uniform history of treating recidivism as a sentencing factor led the Court to conclude that the aggravating fact there—a prior conviction for certain crimes—was merely a sentencing factor exempt from the jury-trial requirement of the Sixth Amendment. By contrast, Congress has made "serious bodily injury" an element of many crimes, such as assault by a member of the armed forces, 10 U.S.C. § 928; violence at international airports, 18 U.S.C. § 37; and genocide, 18 U.S.C. § 1091. Furthermore, carjacking is a species of robbery, and hence both Congress and state legislatures have traditionally treated serious bodily injury as an element of a more serious robbery crime.

Both the Government and the Ninth Circuit had identified statements of members of Congress that suggested, in their opinion, Congress's intent to make "serious bodily injury" a sentencing factor. The Court was not persuaded, for some members had used the phrase "penalty enhancement", which the Court did not take to mean precisely the same thing as "sentencing factor". The fact that other members had referred to the crime of carjacking, as opposed to the crimes of carjacking, also had little significance for the Court. Ultimately, there was no reason to believe that in this case Congress had abandoned any of the models it had previously employed.

Although there were arguments to be made in favor of treating "serious bodily injury" as a sentencing factor, the rule that statutes should be construed to avoid constitutional difficulties counseled in favor of treating it as an element of the crime. In Mullaney v. Wilbur, 421 U.S. 684 (1975), the Court had held that a state could not define murder so as to require the defendant to affirmatively prove that he had acted in the heat of passion, so as to reduce the crime to manslaughter. In light of the "centuries-old common law recognition of malice as the fact distinguishing murder from manslaughter" and of the "widely held modern view that heat of passion, once raised by the evidence, was a subject of the State's burden," due process required the state to bear the burden of proving absence of heat of passion. Otherwise, the state could "manipulate its way out" of the requirement that it prove every element of the crime beyond a reasonable doubt.

In Patterson v. New York, 432 U.S. 197 (1977), however, the Court had held that New York's definition of homicide, which had no malice element, did not improperly force the defendant to disprove that he had acted with malice. New York was free to define homicide without reference to a malice element without violating the traditional rule that the burden of proof in criminal cases rests on the state. And in McMillan v. Pennsylvania, 477 U.S. 79 (1986), the Court held that a mandatory minimum five-year sentence for possessing a firearm was not subject to the jury-trial and proof-beyond-a-reasonable-doubt requirement, because it did not increase the maximum punishment to which the defendant was exposed.

The distinguishing factor between Mullaney on the one hand and Patterson and McMillan on the other was that the fact in question exposed the defendant to a greater punishment. So too in this case, the facts of "serious bodily injury" or death exposed the defendant charged with federal carjacking to greater punishment than if those facts were not proved. Furthermore, removing these determinations from the jury's purview was not consistent with the role of the jury in the 18th century, which had tremendous control over the punishment a defendant would suffer. Thus, to avoid any unnecessary tension with Mullaney, Patterson, and McMillan, the Court held that these facts were elements of separate federal carjacking crimes.

== Dissenting opinion ==
Justice Kennedy faulted the Court for skewing a simple question of statutory interpretation by invoking the "specter of grave and doubtful constitutional interpretations". He believed that the Court's textual analysis was incorrect, and that the constitutional rule the Court formulated would "upset the proper federal balance" of power between the judiciary and the legislature. As far as the textual analysis was concerned, the fact that the opening paragraph was complete in itself, and that the first subsection added no new facts, led Kennedy to conclude that the other two were mere sentencing enhancements. "Serious bodily harm", like recidivism, was "as typical a sentencing factor as one might imagine"; indeed, Kennedy pointed to the laws of several states that made the magnitude of harm to the victim or victims the basis for increased criminal punishment. Significant differences between the structure of the federal carjacking statute and both the other federal robbery statutes and the state statutes on which the majority relied also suggested to Kennedy that the text of the federal carjacking statute made "serious bodily injury" a sentencing factor.

Because, for Kennedy, the text of the statute was not clearly susceptible to two different interpretations, there was no need to invoke the principle of constitutional avoidance as the majority did. In any event, the constitutional rule the Court articulated could too easily be circumvented, simply by rewriting the statute using slightly different words. The requirements imposed by the Sixth Amendment should not depend on the vagaries of Congress's choice of words when it drafts a statute. And if that should be so, the Court should more clearly spell out what words and phrases Congress should use in order to trigger certain constitutional protections. Furthermore, Kennedy saw no difference of constitutional significance between recidivism, which the Court had already held was excluded from the set of facts to which the jury-trial requirement applies, and "serious bodily injury"; the mere "tradition" of doing so might justify this difference, if it were more clear that the carjacking statute were consistent with that tradition.

== See also ==
- List of United States Supreme Court cases, volume 526
