= Taylor v. United States (1990) =

- Supreme Court of the United States

Argued February 28, 1990 Decided May 29, 1990
- Full case name: Arthur Lajuane Taylor, Petitioner v. United States
- Citations: 495 U.S. 575 (more) 110 S. Ct. 2143; 109 L. Ed. 2d 607; 1990 U.S. LEXIS 2788

Case history
- Prior: Sentence imposed by the United States District Court for the Eastern District of Missouri and affirmed by the Eighth Circuit, 864 F.2d 625 (8th Cir. 1989), cert. granted, 493 U.S. 889 (1989).

Holding
- In determining whether a prior burglary conviction counts against a defendant for purposes of the Armed Career Criminal Act, district courts must employ a formal categorical approach, looking only to the fact of the prior conviction and the statutory definition of the predicate offense and also, in a narrow class of cases, the charging documents and jury instructions, so that the sentencing court may determine whether the defendant had been convicted of "burglary" in the generic sense.

Court membership
- Chief Justice William Rehnquist Associate Justices William J. Brennan Jr. · Byron White; Thurgood Marshall · Harry Blackmun; John P. Stevens · Sandra Day O'Connor; Antonin Scalia · Anthony Kennedy

Case opinions
- Majority: Blackmun, joined by Rehnquist, Brennan, White, Marshall, Stevens, O'Connor, Kennedy; Scalia (all but Part II)
- Concurrence: Scalia

Laws applied
- 18 U.S.C. § 924(e)

Taylor v. United States, 495 U.S. 575 (1990), was a U.S. Supreme Court decision that filled in an important gap in the federal criminal law of sentencing. The federal criminal code does not contain a definition of many crimes, including burglary, the crime at issue in this case. Yet sentencing enhancements applicable to federal crimes allow for the enhancement of a defendant's sentence if he has been convicted of prior felonies. The Court addressed in this case how "burglary" should be defined for purposes of such sentencing enhancements when the federal criminal code contained no definition of "burglary." The approach the Court adopted in this case has guided the lower federal courts in interpreting other provisions of the criminal code that also refer to generic crimes not otherwise defined in federal law.

== Facts ==
Taylor pleaded guilty to being a felon in possession of a firearm in the United States District Court for the Eastern District of Missouri, in violation of 18 U.S.C. § 922(g). At the time, Taylor had four prior convictions—one for robbery, one for assault, and two were for second-degree burglary under Missouri law. The government sought the sentence enhancement under the Armed Career Criminal Act, codified in 18 U.S.C. § 924(e):

(1) In the case of a person who violates section 922(g)... and has three previous convictions by any court... for a violent felony or a serious drug offense, or both... such person shall be fined not more than $25,000 and imprisoned not less than fifteen years.

(2) As used in this subsection —

(B) the term "violent felony" means any crime punishable by imprisonment for a term exceeding one year that —

(i) has as an element the use, attempted use, or threatened use of physical force against the person of another, or
(ii) is burglary, arson, or extortion, involves use of explosives, or otherwise involves conduct that presents a serious potential risk of physical injury to another.

Taylor conceded that his prior assault and arson convictions qualified for the § 924(e) sentencing enhancement, but disputed that his two burglary convictions qualified for the enhancement, because they did not present a serious risk of physical injury to another. The district court rejected this argument, and sentenced Taylor to 15 years without parole.

The United States Court of Appeals for the Eighth Circuit affirmed the sentence. It ruled that "burglary" "means burglary however a state chooses to define it," the district court properly counted both of Taylor's Missouri burglary convictions under the § 924(e) sentence enhancement. The U.S. Supreme Court agreed to review the case so that it could resolve a conflict among the federal courts of appeals about how "burglary" should be defined under § 924(e).

== Opinion of the Court ==
The Court had to answer how to define "burglary" in § 924(e). It had no "single accepted meaning" in the laws of the states, and the text of the statute does not suggest a particular meaning. Should it therefore mean whatever the state of the defendant's prior conviction defines "burglary" to be? Should it instead have a more uniform definition? And if so, what should the source of that more uniform definition be?

The Court examined the progress of the bill that became § 924(e) as it wound its way through Congress. Throughout the legislative process, Congress consistently focused on "career offenders" — "those who commit a large number of fairly serious crimes as their means of livelihood and who, because they possess weapons, present at least a potential threat of harm to persons." Congress likewise singled out burglary because of the potential for harm that crime entails as compared to simple larceny or automobile crimes. Unlawful entry into a building always presents the danger of a confrontation, and if the intruder is likely to be armed, that confrontation becomes that much more dangerous. In earlier versions of the bill, Congress had specifically defined "burglary," thus suggesting that Congress had intended to take a "categorical approach" to defining burglary despite leaving the term undefined in the final version of the bill. Furthermore, the legislative history suggested that Congress intended that categorical approach to encompass a "generic" view of burglary, "roughly corresponding to the definitions of burglary in a majority of the States' criminal codes." In this way, Congress could avoid leaving the precise contours to the vagaries of varying definitions and labels crafted by other jurisdictions.

In light of these concerns, the Court rejected the Eighth Circuit's approach, which relegated the definition to state law. Because of differences in state laws, "a person imprudent enough to shoplift or steal from an automobile in California would be found, under the Ninth Circuit's view, to have committed a burglary constituting a "violent felony" for enhancement purposes — yet a person who did so in Michigan might not." Not seeing a clear indication that Congress intended for this to be the case, the Court reasoned that "odd results of this kind" should not result from interpreting § 924(e).

The Court next considered whether it should read the word "burglary" in § 924(e) as the common law did. This approach had some appeal; after all, all states' definitions of "burglary" included the common-law definition of burglary — breaking and entering of a dwelling at night with the intent to commit a felony once inside. But the difficulty with this approach was that modern definitions have strayed far from the common-law definition. For instance, most states allow entry without "breaking," allow burglary to occur during the daytime, and require no felonious intent once inside. "The arcane distinctions embedded in the common-law definition have little relevance to modern law enforcement concerns." Conversely, few acts that fall under the modern definition of "burglary" would also count as burglary under the common law. And although the Court sometimes applied the maxim that undefined statutory terms would carry the common-law definition, it reasoned that that maxim would not apply where the common-law definition was outmoded. For these reasons, the Court rejected the idea of reading § 924(e)'s definition of "burglary" as the common-law definition.

Before the Court, Taylor proposed a definition that defined "burglary" to include only "entering a building of another with the intent to commit a crime that has as an element conduct that presents a serious risk of physical injury to another." The Court rejected this idea because it was not supported by the language of the statute. The statute says, "any crime punishable by imprisonment for a term exceeding one year that is burglary." This suggested that Congress intended to include the entire scope of "burglary," not just some subset, as a predicate offense. "This choice of language indicates that Congress thought ordinary burglaries, as well as burglaries involving some element making them especially dangerous, presented a sufficiently 'serious potential risk' to count toward enhancement."

This left a "generic" meaning of the word "burglary" — an unlawful or unprivileged entry into, or remaining in, a building or other structure, with intent to commit a crime. If the defendant's prior conviction involves a crime with these basic elements, regardless of the label, it counts as a predicate offense under § 924(e).

The final step in the Court's analysis was to settle the question of how to prove whether a particular defendant's conviction qualifies as "generic burglary." If the state statute is narrower, then "there is no problem, because the conviction necessarily implies that the defendant has been found guilty of all the elements of generic burglary." If the state's definition of "burglary" matches the definition of "generic burglary," or varies from it only slightly, then that too is sufficient. However, where a state's definition of burglary is broader than the definition of "generic burglary," or where a state does not have a crime called "burglary," the problem of proving whether the conviction is for "generic burglary" is more difficult. The statute says "has three prior convictions," not "has thrice committed acts which." This suggests that it is the elements of the conviction rather than the facts supporting it that matters. In appropriate cases, the trial court may look past the statute of conviction to the indictment or information and the jury instructions to determine whether, with respect to any one of the defendant's prior convictions, he was convicted of a crime whose elements match the elements of "generic burglary."

=== Justice Scalia's concurrence ===
Justice Scalia concurred in the opinion of the Court, except for its discussion of the legislative history — the form the law took when it was a bill pending before Congress, and the statements various members of Congress made while it was pending. Justice Scalia believed that the text of the statute passed by Congress was the only thing that was important. "The examination [of the legislative history] does not uncover anything useful (i.e., anything that tempts us to alter the meaning we deduce from the text anyway), but that is the usual consequence of these inquiries (and a good thing, too)." Ultimately, though, Justice Scalia found the effort futile. "I can discern no reason for devoting 10 pages of today's opinion to legislative history, except to show that we have given this case close and careful consideration. We must find some better way of demonstrating our conscientiousness."

== See also ==
- List of United States Supreme Court cases, volume 495
- List of United States Supreme Court cases
- Lists of United States Supreme Court cases by volume
- List of United States Supreme Court cases by the Rehnquist Court
