= 2007 term opinions of the Supreme Court of the United States =

October 2007 to October 2008 opinions

The 2007 term of the Supreme Court of the United States began October 1, 2007, and concluded September 30, 2008. The table illustrates which opinion was filed by each justice in each case and which justices joined each opinion.

== Table key ==
Delivered the court's opinion

Joined the court's opinion

Filed a concurrence

Joined a concurrence

Filed a dissent

Joined a dissent

Filed a concurrence/dissent

Joined a concurrence/dissent

Did not participate in the decision
- Decisions that do not note an argument date were decided without oral argument. Decisions that do not note a justice delivering the court's opinion are per curiam.
- Multiple concurrences and dissents within a case are numbered, with joining votes numbered accordingly. Justices frequently join multiple opinions in a single case; each vote is subdivided accordingly.
- An asterisk ( * ) in the court's opinion denotes that it was only a majority in part or a plurality. An asterisk in a joining vote denotes that the justice joined it only in part.
- A dash ( - ) denotes that the justice voted without filing or joining an opinion.

== 2007 term opinions ==
#	Case name and citation	Argued	Decided	Roberts	Stevens	Scalia	Kennedy	Souter	Thomas	Ginsburg	Breyer	Alito
1	Board of Ed. of City School Dist. of New York v. Tom F., 552 U.S. 1	October 1, 2007	October 10, 2007									
2	Allen v. Siebert, 552 U.S. 3		November 5, 2007									
3	CSX Transp., Inc. v. Georgia State Bd. of Equalization, 552 U.S. 9	November 5, 2007	December 4, 2007									
4	Logan v. United States, 552 U.S. 23	October 30, 2007	December 4, 2007									
5	Gall v. United States, 552 U.S. 38	October 2, 2007	December 10, 2007			1		2	1			2
6	Watson v. United States, 552 U.S. 74	October 9, 2007	December 10, 2007									
7	Kimbrough v. United States, 552 U.S. 85	October 2, 2007	December 10, 2007						1			2
8	Arave v. Hoffman, 552 U.S. 117		January 7, 2008									
9	Wright v. Van Patten, 552 U.S. 120		January 7, 2008									
10	John R. Sand & Gravel Co. v. United States, 552 U.S. 130	November 6, 2007	January 7, 2008		1					1 / 2		
11	Stoneridge Investment Partners v. Scientific-Atlanta, Inc., 552 U.S. 148	October 9, 2007	January 15, 2008									
12	Knight v. Commissioner, 552 U.S. 181	November 27, 2007	January 16, 2008									
13	New York State Bd. of Elections v. Lopez Torres, 552 U.S. 196	October 3, 2007	January 16, 2008		1		2	1			2*	
14	Ali v. Federal Bureau of Prisons, 552 U.S. 214	October 29, 2007	January 22, 2008		1 / 2		1	1			1 / 2	
15	LaRue v. DeWolff, Boberg & Associates, Inc., 552 U.S. 248	November 26, 2007	February 20, 2008	1		2	1		2			
16	Danforth v. Minnesota, 552 U.S. 264	October 31, 2007	February 20, 2008									
17	Riegel v. Medtronic, Inc., 552 U.S. 312	December 4, 2007	February 20, 2008		*							
18	Preston v. Ferrer, 552 U.S. 346	January 14, 2008	February 20, 2008									
19	Rowe v. New Hampshire Motor Transp. Assn., 552 U.S. 364	November 28, 2007	February 20, 2008			* / 1				2		
20	Sprint/United Management Co. v. Mendelsohn, 552 U.S. 379	December 3, 2007	February 26, 2008									
21	Federal Express Corp. v. Holowecki, 552 U.S. 389	November 6, 2007	February 27, 2008									
22	Boulware v. United States, 552 U.S. 421	January 8, 2008	March 3, 2008									
23	Warner-Lambert Co. v. Kent, 552 U.S. 440	February 25, 2008	March 3, 2008									
24	Washington State Grange v. Washington State Republican Party, 552 U.S. 442	October 1, 2007	March 18, 2008									
25	Snyder v. Louisiana, 552 U.S. 472	December 4, 2007	March 19, 2008									
26	Medellín v. Texas, 552 U.S. 491	October 10, 2007	March 25, 2008									
27	Hall Street Associates, L. L. C. v. Mattel, Inc., 552 U.S. 576	November 7, 2007	March 25, 2008		1	*	1				2	
28	New Jersey v. Delaware, 552 U.S. 597	November 27, 2007	March 31, 2008		*							
29	United States v. Clintwood Elkhorn Mining Co., 553 U.S. 1	March 24, 2008	April 15, 2008									
30	MeadWestvaco Corp. v. Illinois Dept. of Revenue, 553 U.S. 16	January 16, 2008	April 15, 2008									
31	Baze v. Rees, 553 U.S. 35	January 7, 2008	April 16, 2008	*	1	2 / 3			2 / 3		4	5
32	Burgess v. United States, 553 U.S. 124	March 24, 2008	April 16, 2008									
33	Begay v. United States, 553 U.S. 137	January 15, 2008	April 16, 2008									
34	Virginia v. Moore, 553 U.S. 164	January 14, 2008	April 23, 2008									
35	Crawford v. Marion County Election Bd., 553 U.S. 181	January 9, 2008	April 28, 2008		*			1		1	2	
36	Gonzalez v. United States, 553 U.S. 242	January 8, 2008	May 12, 2008									
37	United States v. Ressam, 553 U.S. 272	March 25, 2008	May 19, 2008			*			*			
38	United States v. Williams (2008), 553 U.S. 285	October 30, 2007	May 19, 2008									
39	Department of Revenue of Ky. v. Davis, 553 U.S. 328	November 5, 2007	May 19, 2008	* / 1	2	* / 3	1	*	4	*		1 / 2
40	United States v. Rodriquez, 553 U.S. 377	January 15, 2008	May 19, 2008									
41	Riley v. Kennedy, 553 U.S. 406	March 24, 2008	May 27, 2008									
42	CBOCS West, Inc. v. Humphries, 553 U.S. 442	February 20, 2008	May 27, 2008									
43	Gomez-Perez v. Potter, 553 U.S. 474	February 19, 2008	May 27, 2008	1		1* / 2			1* / 2			
44	United States v. Santos, 553 U.S. 507	October 3, 2007	June 2, 2008	2		*	2		*		1 / 2	2
45	Regalado Cuellar v. United States, 553 U.S. 550	February 25, 2008	June 2, 2008									
46	Richlin Security Service Co. v. Chertoff, 553 U.S. 571	March 19, 2008	June 2, 2008			*			*			
47	Engquist v. Oregon Dept. of Agriculture, 553 U.S. 591	April 21, 2008	June 9, 2008									
48	Quanta Computer, Inc. v. LG Electronics, Inc., 553 U.S. 617	January 16, 2008	June 9, 2008									
49	Bridge v. Phoenix Bond & Indemnity Co., 553 U.S. 639	April 14, 2008	June 9, 2008									
50	Allison Engine Co. v. United States ex rel. Sanders, 553 U.S. 662	February 26, 2008	June 9, 2008									
51	Munaf v. Geren, 553 U.S. 674	March 25, 2008	June 12, 2008									
52	Irizarry v. United States, 553 U.S. 708	April 15, 2008	June 12, 2008									
53	Boumediene v. Bush, 553 U.S. 723	December 5, 2007	June 12, 2008	1 / 2		1 / 2			1 / 2			1 / 2
54	Republic of Philippines v. Pimentel, 553 U.S. 851	March 17, 2008	June 12, 2008		* / 1			* / 2				
55	Taylor v. Sturgell, 553 U.S. 880	April 16, 2008	June 12, 2008									
56	Dada v. Mukasey, 554 U.S. 1	January 7, 2008	June 16, 2008	1		1			1			2
57	Florida Dept. of Revenue v. Piccadilly Cafeterias, Inc., 554 U.S. 33	March 26, 2008	June 16, 2008									
58	Chamber of Commerce v. Brown, 554 U.S. 60	March 19, 2008	June 19, 2008									
59	Meacham v. Knolls Atomic Power Laboratory, 554 U.S. 84	April 23, 2008	June 19, 2008						*			
60	Metropolitan Life Ins. Co. v. Glenn, 554 U.S. 105	April 23, 2008	June 19, 2008	*								
61	Kentucky Retirement Systems v. EEOC, 554 U.S. 135	January 9, 2008	June 19, 2008									
62	Indiana v. Edwards, 554 U.S. 164	March 26, 2008	June 19, 2008									
63	Rothgery v. Gillespie County, 554 U.S. 191	March 17, 2008	June 23, 2008	1 / 2		1 / 2						2
64	Greenlaw v. United States, 554 U.S. 237	April 15, 2008	June 23, 2008								*	
65	Sprint Communications Co. v. APCC Services, Inc., 554 U.S. 269	April 21, 2008	June 23, 2008									
66	Plains Commerce Bank v. Long Family Land and Cattle Co., Inc., 554 U.S. 316	April 14, 2008	June 25, 2008		*			*		*	*	
67	Giles v. California, 554 U.S. 353	April 22, 2008	June 25, 2008			*		* / 1	2	* / 1		3
68	Kennedy v. Louisiana, 554 U.S. 407	April 16, 2008	June 25, 2008									
69	Exxon Shipping Co. v. Baker, 554 U.S. 471	February 27, 2008	June 25, 2008		* / 1					* / 2	* / 3	
70	Morgan Stanley Cap. Group v. Pub. Util. Dist. #1 of Snohomish Cty., 554 U.S. 527	February 19, 2008	June 26, 2008							*		
71	District of Columbia v. Heller, 554 U.S. 570	March 18, 2008	June 26, 2008		1 / 2			1 / 2		1 / 2	1 / 2	
72	Davis v. Federal Election Comm’n, 554 U.S. 724	April 22, 2008	June 26, 2008		* / 1			* / 1*		* / 1* / 2	* / 1* / 2	
73	Medellín v. Texas, 554 U.S. 759		August 5, 2008		1			2		3	4	
#	Case name and citation	Argued	Decided	Roberts	Stevens	Scalia	Kennedy	Souter	Thomas	Ginsburg	Breyer	Alito

== 2007 term membership and statistics ==
This was the third term of Chief Justice Roberts' tenure and the second full term with the same membership.

Justice		Appointment history		Agreement with judgment		Opinions filed				
Seniority	Name	President	Date confirmed	%	#					Total
Chief Justice	John Roberts	George W. Bush	September 29, 2005	90.1%	64/71	8	5	0	4	17
Associate Justice	John Paul Stevens	Gerald Ford	December 19, 1975	74%	54/73	7	8	4	9	28
Associate Justice	Antonin Scalia	Ronald Reagan	September 26, 1986	82.2%	60/73	8	10	0	6	24
Associate Justice	Anthony Kennedy	Ronald Reagan	February 18, 1988	86.1%	62/72	7	1	1	3	12
Associate Justice	David Souter	George H. W. Bush	October 9, 1990	76.7%	56/73	7	4	1	4	16
Associate Justice	Clarence Thomas	George H. W. Bush	October 23, 1991	76.7%	56/73	7	7	1	9	24
Associate Justice	Ruth Bader Ginsburg	Bill Clinton	August 10, 1993	75.3%	55/73	8	4	3	4	19
Associate Justice	Stephen Breyer	Bill Clinton	August 3, 1994	76.8%	53/69	8	2	1	12	23
Associate Justice	Samuel Alito	George W. Bush	January 31, 2006	83.3%	60/72	7	4	0	8	19
Notes on statistics: Opinion counts only include the bench opinions listed above; opinions relating to orders or in-chambers opinions are not included.; Agreement with the Court's judgment does not guarantee agreement with the reasoning expressed in its opinion. A justice is not considered in agreement if they dissented even in part. Agreement percentages are based only on the listed cases in which a justice participated and are rounded to the nearest one-tenth of one percentage point.						Totals				
Notes on statistics: Opinion counts only include the bench opinions listed above; opinions relating to orders or in-chambers opinions are not included.; Agreement with the Court's judgment does not guarantee agreement with the reasoning expressed in its opinion. A justice is not considered in agreement if they dissented even in part. Agreement percentages are based only on the listed cases in which a justice participated and are rounded to the nearest one-tenth of one percentage point.						67	45	11	59	182
