= Danforth v. Minnesota =

- Supreme Court of the United States

Decided February 20, 2008
- Full case name: Danforth v. Minnesota
- Citations: 552 U.S. 264 (more)

Holding
- State courts can retroactively apply a new constitutional rule of criminal procedure by applying state law retroactivity standards that are broader than Teague v. Lane.

Court membership
- Chief Justice John Roberts Associate Justices John P. Stevens · Antonin Scalia; Anthony Kennedy · David Souter; Clarence Thomas · Ruth Bader Ginsburg; Stephen Breyer · Samuel Alito

Case opinions
- Majority: Stevens, joined by Scalia, Souter, Thomas, Ginsburg, Breyer, Alito
- Dissent: Roberts, joined by Kennedy

Danforth v. Minnesota, 552 U.S. 264 (2008), was a United States Supreme Court case in which the Court held that state courts can retroactively apply a new constitutional rule of criminal procedure in post-conviction proceedings by applying state law retroactivity standards that are broader than the Teague v. Lane standard.

== See also ==
- Edwards v. Vannoy
- Montgomery v. Louisiana
