= Murder in Nebraska law =

Murder in Nebraska law constitutes the intentional killing, under circumstances defined by law, of people within or under the jurisdiction of the U.S. state of Nebraska.

The United States Centers for Disease Control and Prevention reported that in the year 2020, the state had a murder rate well below the median for the entire country.

"Nebraska mandates a two-tiered proportionality review of aggravated murder sentences; non-murder sentencing is left to a factors-based, subjective judicial process that is subject to review for abuse of discretion".

Nebraska law requires that the state supreme court "must review murder sentences for proportionality upon appeal". The court "is vested with the power to reduce any homicide sentence which it finds 'not to be consistent with' §§29-2521.01-29-2521.04, 29-2522, and 29-2524".

The 2021 case of State v. Golka, held that the 2010 United States Supreme Court decision in Graham v. Florida, addressing cruel and unusual punishments for minors, "does not apply to homicide cases. LWOP for juvenile convicted of first degree murder is not cruel and unusual punishment".

== Penalties ==
Offense	Mandatory sentencing
Second degree murder	Minimum of 20 years and maximum of life without parole (eligible for parole if the defendant was under 18)
First degree murder	Death (aggravating circumstances), life without parole (reviewed by Nebraska state parole board), or 40 years to life (only an option if the defendant was under 18; sentence can be halved for good behavior)
