= McArthur v. Scott =

- Supreme Court of the United States

Argued January 28–29, 1885 Reargued April 7–9, 1885 Decided March 2, 1885
- Full case name: McArthur v. Scott
- Citations: 113 U.S. 340 (more) 5 S. Ct. 652; 28 L. Ed. 1015; 1885 U.S. LEXIS 1690

Holding
- In actions contesting wills, people who were not yet born at the time of the action cannot be bound by the decision if the representative of their interest was antagonistic to them.

Court membership
- Chief Justice Morrison Waite Associate Justices Samuel F. Miller · Stephen J. Field; Joseph P. Bradley · John M. Harlan; William B. Woods · Stanley Matthews; Horace Gray · Samuel Blatchford

Case opinions
- Majority: Gray, joined by Miller, Field, Bradley, Woods, Blatchford
- Dissent: Waite, joined by Harlan
- Matthews took no part in the consideration or decision of the case.

McArthur v. Scott, 113 U.S. 340 (1885), was a United States Supreme Court case in which the Court held that, in actions contesting wills, people who were not yet born at the time of the action cannot be bound by the decision if the representative of their interest was antagonistic to them. In other words, the doctrine of virtual representation only applies to a person when there was a fair presentation of the arguments in that person's favor. The case was followed faithfully in federal courts and was also generally accepted by state courts.

The case was about a contested will that directed land to be conveyed to or divided among remaindermen at the expiration of a particular estate. The court's ruling meant that the unborn grandchildren with a contingent interest were held not bound by the decree setting aside probate of the will.

== Background ==
General Duncan McArthur (died 1839), the former Governor of Ohio, established a trust in his will that required that land in Ross County, Ohio be kept in the family. His descendants later wanted to sell the land.

A testator devised lands and personal property to his executors and their successors and their heirs, in trust, and directed that the income, until his youngest grandchild who might live to be twenty-one years of age should arrive at that age, should be divided equally among the testator's children or the issue of any child who had died, and among the grandchildren also as they successively came of age; that "after the decease of all my children, and when and as soon as the youngest grandchild shall arrive at the age of twenty-one years," the lands should be "inherited and equally divided between my grandchildren per capita," in fee, and that "in like manner" the personal property should "at the same time be equally divided among my said grandchildren, share and share alike per capita," and that if any grandchild should have died before the final division leaving children, they should take and receive per stirpes the share which their parent would have been entitled to have and receive if then living, and provided that any assignment, mortgage, or pledge by any grandchild of his share should be void, and the executors, in the final division and distribution, should convey and pay to the persons entitled under the will. Held that the executors took the legal title in fee, to hold until the final division, and that the trusts were imposed upon them as executors. Held, also that all the grandchildren took equitable vested remainders, opening to let in those born after the testator's death, and subject to be divested only as to any grandchild who died before the expiration of the particular estate, leaving issue, by an executory devise over to such issue.

== Decision ==
The grandchildren of the testator, the lawful issue of his five enumerated children, formed one class of beneficiaries provided for in the will. As a class, their interests were opposed to those contesting the will. Those of the class who were in being took the title as well for themselves as for those who should be afterwards born. The interests of those in being and those born afterwards were in all respects the same. It would seem, therefore, that whatever bound those who held the title should bind all those not then in being for whom they held it. Otherwise, as in Ohio, no suit can be brought to contest a will except within two years after probate. It is difficult to see how a will can be contested there when the devise is to a class of persons which may not be full until after that period has elapsed. It is no part of the duty of executors to defend a will against a contest. That is left to the devisees or those interested in sustaining the will. As this, in our opinion, disposes of the case, we have deemed it unnecessary to refer specially to any of the other questions which were presented in argument.

Associate Justice Stanley Matthews did not participate in the decision because he had represented involved parties as a lawyer previously.

== Later developments ==
This case was not about a class action, but later courts applied its rule to class actions.

Some commentators interested in the United States abortion debate have described this case as recognizing a property right belonging to a person while they are still in utero.

In Taylor v. Sturgell (2008), the Supreme Court held that a virtually-represented non-party cannot be bound by a judgment. Thus, the concept of virtual representation no longer exists in the federal legal system. Class actions continue to exist.
