= Assignment (law) =

In law, the transfer of ownership of a thing from one person to another

Assignment, or assignation, (Note: Latin: cessio) is a legal term used in the context of the laws of contract and of property. In both instances, assignment is the process whereby a person, the assignor, transfers rights or benefits to another, the assignee. An assignment may not transfer a duty, burden or detriment without the express agreement of the assignee. The right or benefit being assigned may be a gift (such as a waiver) or it may be paid for with a contractual consideration such as money.

The rights may be vested or contingent, and may include an equitable interest. Mortgages and loans are relatively straightforward and amenable to assignment. An assignor may assign rights, such as a mortgage note issued by a third party borrower, and this would require the latter to make repayments to the assignee.

A related concept of assignment is novation wherein, by agreement with all parties, one contracting party is replaced by a new party. While novation requires the consent of all parties, assignment needs no consent from other non-assigning parties. However, in the case of assignment, the consent of the non-assigning party may be required by a contractual provision.

== Procedure ==
An assignment does not necessarily have to be made in writing; however, the assignment agreement must show an intent to transfer rights. The effect of a valid assignment is to extinguish privity (in other words, contractual relationship, including right to sue) between the assignor and the third-party obligor and create privity between the obligor and the assignee.

== Liabilities and duties ==
Unless the contractual agreement states otherwise, the assignee typically does not receive more rights than the assignor, and the assignor may remain liable to the original counterparty for the performance of the contract. The assignor often delegates duties in addition to rights to the assignee, but the assignor may remain ultimately responsible.

However, in the United States, there are various laws which limit the liability of the assignee, often to facilitate credit, as assignees are typically lenders. Notable examples include a provision in the Truth in Lending Act and provisions in the Consumer Leasing Act and the Home Ownership Equity Protection Act. The Assignment of Claims Act of 1940 was passed to provide legal protection for financial institutions funding wartime defense contracts.

In other cases, the contract may be a negotiable instrument in which the person receiving the instrument may become a holder in due course, which is similar to an assignee except that issues, such as lack of performance, by the assignor may not be a valid defense for the obligor. As a response, the United States Federal Trade Commission promulgated Rule 433, formally known as the "Trade Regulation Rule Concerning Preservation of Consumers' Claims and Defenses", which "effectively abolished the [holder in due course] doctrine in consumer credit transactions". In 2012, the commission reaffirmed the regulation.

== Assignment of contract rights ==
After the assignment of contractual rights, the assignee will receive all benefits that had accrued to the assignor. For example, if A contracts to sell his car for $100 to B, A may assign the benefits (the right to be paid $100) to C. (Note: In this scenario, Party A is the obligee/assignor, Party B is an obligor, and Party C is the assignee.) In this case, Party C is not a third party beneficiary, because the contract was not made for C's benefit. Assignment takes place after the contract was formed; they may not precede them.

=== When assignment will be permitted ===
The common law favors the freedom of assignment, so an assignment will generally be permitted unless there is an express prohibition against assignment in the contract. Where assignment is thus permitted, the assignor need not consult the other party to the contract. An assignment cannot have any effect on the duties of the other party to the contract, nor can it reduce the possibility of the other party receiving full performance of the same quality. Certain kinds of performance, therefore, cannot be assigned, because they create a unique relationship between the parties to the contract. For example, the assignment of a legal malpractice claim is void since an assignee would be a stranger to the attorney-client relationship, who was owed no duty by the attorney and would imperil the sanctity of the highly confidential and fiduciary relationship existing between attorney and client.

Torts are not assignable as public policy, and various statutes may prohibit assignment in certain instances. In addition, the Restatement (Second) of Contracts lists prohibitions in §317(2)(a) based upon the effect to the non-assigning party (obligor), with similar prohibitions in the Uniform Commercial Code §2-210. For example, UCC §2-210 states the following:

Unless otherwise agreed all rights of either seller or buyer can be assigned except where the assignment would materially change the duty of the other party, or increase materially the burden or risk imposed on him by his contract, or impair materially his chance of obtaining return performance. A right to damages for breach of the whole contract or a right arising out of the assignor's due performance of his entire obligation can be assigned despite agreementotherwise [sic].

Equipment Lease Agreements typically contain language prohibiting the lessee from assigning the lease to a third party. For example, "You have no right to sell, transfer, assign, sublease, or encumber the equipment or this agreement" protects the Lessor’s collateral and credit underwriting guidelines in the event the lessee ever wants to transfer the lease to another party. However, it is possible to assign the lease, but the new party (assignee) will be subject to the lessor’s credit evaluation process and approval. Even if the assignee is approved, the existing lessee’s (assignor’s) personal guarantee(s), if any, might not be released unless the assignee’s credit stature is extremely strong.

=== Legislation preventing assignment ===
The US Congress first restricted the assignment of claims against the United States government in 1846, when it passed "An Act in Relation to the Payment of Claims". Title 41 of the United States Code § 6305 now provides the federal prohibition on transfers of government contracts, stating that the governmental entity which originally issued a contract must agree to any transfer or it is automatically invalid by law.

=== Requirements for an effective assignment ===
For assignment to be effective, it must occur in the present: a promise to make a future assignment has no legal effect. No specific language is required to make such an assignment, but the assignor must make some clear statement of intent to assign clearly identified contractual rights to the assignee. A promise to assign in the future has no legal effect. Although this prevents a party from assigning the benefits of a contract that has not yet been made, a court of equity may enforce such an assignment where an established economic relationship between the assignor and the assignee raised an expectation that the assignee would indeed form the appropriate contract in the future.

A contract may contain a non-assignment clause, which prohibits the assignment of specific rights and some various rights, or of the entire contract, to another. However, such a clause does not necessarily destroy the power of either party to make an assignment. Instead, it merely gives the other party the ability to sue for breach of contract if such an assignment is made. However, an assignment of a contract containing such a clause will be ineffective if the assignee knows of the non-assignment clause, or if the non-assignment clause specifies that "all assignments are void".

Two other techniques to prevent the assignment of contracts are rescission clauses or clauses creating a condition subsequent. The former would give the other party to the contract the power to rescind the contract if an assignment is made; the latter would rescind the contract automatically in such circumstances.

==== Requirement of a writing ====
There are certain situations in which the assignment must be in writing.

1. Assignment of wages; additionally, statutes may prohibit this assignment
2. Assignment of any interest in real property
3. Assignment of choses in action worth over $500

=== Delegation ===
A parallel concept to assignment is delegation, which occurs when one party transfers his duties or liabilities under a contract to another. A delegation and an assignment can be accomplished at the same time, although a non-assignment clause may also bar delegation.

== Remedies ==
Legal remedies may be available if the non-assigning party's rights are affected by the assignment.

=== Revocability ===
Assignments made for consideration are irrevocable, meaning that the assignor permanently gives up the legal right to take back the assignment once it has been made. Donative assignments, on the other hand, are generally revocable, either by the assignor giving notice to the assignee, taking performance directly from the obligor, or making a subsequent assignment of the same right to another. There are some exceptions to the revocability of a donative assignment:

1. The assignment cannot be revoked if the obligor has already performed
2. The assignment cannot be revoked if the assignee has received a token chose (chose being derived from the French word for "thing", as in a chose of action) - a physical object that signifies a right to collect, such as a stock certificate or the passbook to a savings account.
3. The assignment cannot be revoked if the assignor has set forth in writing the assignment of a simple chose - a contract right embodied in any form of token.
4. Estoppel can prevent the revocation of a donative assignment if the assignee changed their position in reliance on the assignment.

=== Breach and defenses ===
A cause of action for breach on the part of the obligor lies with the assignee, who will hold the exclusive right to commence a cause of action for any failure to perform or defective performance. At this stage, because the assignee "stands in the shoes" of the assignor, the obligor can raise any defense to the contract that the obligor could have raised against the assignor. Furthermore, the obligor can raise against the assignee counterclaims and setoffs that the obligor had against the assignor. For example, suppose that A makes a contract to paint B's house in exchange for $500. A then assigns the right to receive the $500 to C, to pay off a debt owed to C. However, A does such a careless job painting the house that B has to pay another painter $400 to correct A's work. If C sues B to collect the debt, B can raise his counterclaim for the expenses caused by the poor paint job, and can reduce the amount owed to C by that $400, leaving only $100 to be collected.

When the assignor makes the assignment, he makes with it an implied warranty that the right to assign was not subject to defenses. If the contract had a provision that made the assignment ineffective, the assignee could sue the assignor for breach of this implied warranty. Similarly, the assignee could also sue under this theory if the assignor wrongfully revoked the assignment.

=== Successive assignments ===
Occasionally, an unscrupulous assignor will assign exactly the same rights to multiple parties (usually for some consideration). In that case, the rights of the assignee depend on the revocability of the assignment, and on the timing of the assignments relative to certain other actions.

In a quirk left over from the common law, if the assignment was donative, the last assignee is the true owner of the rights. However, if the assignment was for consideration, the first assignee to actually collect against the assigned contract is the true owner of the rights. Under the modern American rule, now followed in most U.S. jurisdictions, the first assignor with equity (i.e. the first to have paid for the assignment) will have the strongest claim, while remaining assignees may have other remedies. In some countries, the rights of the respective assignees are determined by an old common law rule known as "the rule in Dearle v Hall".

1. Earlier donative assignees for whom the assignment was revocable (because it had not been made irrevocable by any of the means listed above) have no cause of action whatsoever.
2. Earlier donative assignees for whom the assignment was made irrevocable can bring an action for the tort of conversion, because the assignment was technically their property when it was given to a later assignee.
3. Later assignees for consideration have a cause of action for breaches of the implied warranty discussed above.

If an assignee of a chose in action fails to provide a notice to the debtor, then a subsequent assignee with good faith who does provide notice acquires a superior right against the former assignee.

== Special rules for assignment of certain rights ==
=== Property rights ===
Real property rights can be assigned just as any other contractual right. However, special duties and liabilities attach to transfers of the right to possess property. With an assignment, the assignor transfers the complete remainder of the interest to the assignee. The assignor must not retain any sort of reversionary interest in the right to possess. The assignee's interest must abut the interest of the next person to have the right to possession. If any time or interest is reserved by a tenant assignor then the act is not an assignment, but is instead a sublease.

The liability of the assignee depends upon the contract formed when the assignment takes place. However, in general, the assignee has privity of estate with a lessor. With privity of estate comes the duty on the part of the assignee to perform certain obligations under covenant, e.g. pay rent. Similarly, the lessor retains the obligations to perform on covenants to maintain or repair the land.

If the assignor agrees to continue paying rent to the lessor and subsequently defaults, the lessor can sue both the assignor under the original contract signed with the lessor as well as the assignee because by taking possession of the property interest, the assignee has obliged himself to perform duties under covenant such as the payment of rent.

Unlike a Novation where consent of both the lessor and lessee is required for the third party to assume all obligations and liabilities of the original lessee, an assignment does not always need the consent of all parties. If the contract terms state specifically that the lessor's consent is not needed to assign the contract, then the lessee can assign the contract to whomever the lessee wants to.

Absent language to the contrary, a tenant may assign their rights to an assignee without the landlord's consent. In the majority of jurisdictions, when there is a clause that the landlord may withhold consent to an assignment, the general rule is that the landlord may not withhold consent unreasonably unless there is a provision that states specifically that the Landlord may withhold consent at Landlord's sole discretion.

=== Partnership rights ===
A person can also assign their rights to receive the benefits owed to a partner in a partnership. However, the assignee cannot thereby gain any of the assignor's rights with respect to the operation of the partnership. The assignee may not vote on partnership matters, inspect the partnership books, or take possession of partnership property; rather, the assignee can only be given the right is to collect distributions of income, unless the remaining partners consent to the assignment of a new general partner with operational, management, and financial interests. If the partnership is dissolved, the assignee can also claim the assignor's share of any distribution accompanying the dissolution.

=== Intellectual property rights ===
Ownership of intellectual property, including patents, copyrights, and trademarks, may be assigned, but special conditions attach to the assignment of patents and trademarks. In the United States, assignment of a patent is governed by statute, 35 U.S.C. § 261. Patent rights are assignable by an "instrument in writing". Title in a patent can also be transferred as a result of other financial transactions, such as a merger or a takeover, or as a result of operation of law, such as in an inheritance process, or in a bankruptcy. An assignment of a patent can be recorded with the United States Patent and Trademark Office. Although such recording is not required, if an assignment is not recorded at the USPTO within three months or prior to a subsequent assignment, the assignment will be void against a subsequent assignee without notice of the earlier, unrecorded assignment.

With respect to a trademark, the owner of the mark may not transfer ownership of the mark without transferring the goodwill associated with the mark.

Companies sometimes request from employees that they assign all intellectual property they create while under the employment of the company. This is typically done within an Employment Agreement, but is sometimes done through a specific agreement called Proprietary Information and Inventions Agreement (PIIA).

=== Personal injury torts ===
The standard rule is that personal injury tort causes of action are not assignable as a matter of public policy. These should be distinguished from final settlements or judgments resulting from lawsuits brought on such causes of action, which may be assignable.

=== Legal malpractice ===
In the majority of jurisdictions, assignments involving fraud or legal malpractice causes of action are void as against public policy.

=== Non-compete agreements ===
Case law has held that an employee's covenant not to compete is assignable where one business is transferred to another.

=== Assignment in bankruptcy law ===
A general assignment or assignment is a concept in bankruptcy law in which an insolvent entity's assets are assigned to someone as an alternative to a bankruptcy.

== Equitable assignment ==
An equitable assignment is an assignment, or transfer of rights, in equity.

=== General principles ===
There are numerous requirements that exist for an equitable assignment of property, outside the 'standard' clear and unconditional intention to assign. These requirements are fundamental characteristics of a statutory assignment: Absolute assignment (an unconditional transfer: conditions precedent or part of a debt are not absolute) and the assignment must be made in writing and signed by the assignor, and in particular, this applies to real property.

Assigning future property in equity cannot be gratuitous. The assignor must receive consideration for the agreement, otherwise the assignment will be ineffective. However, an absolute assignment does not require consideration to be given. Secondly, between the period of agreement between assignor and assignee and acquisition by the assignor, the assignees rights are not contractual, but rather a proprietary right to the property. This means the assignee has an interest in this future property, in the same manner any owner has over property.

In equity, these principles operate to protect both the assignor and the assignee. In Norman v Federal Commissioner of Taxation, a taxpayer attempted to assign by deed, to his wife certain moneys which he was eventually going to receive. This included dividends and interest due on loans. The court held the interest and the dividends were expectancies or possibilities which could not be assigned without consideration. The court's worry was that assignments without consideration might be used as instruments of fraud, to avoid creditors and tax collection.

=== Mere expectancies ===
Courts will not enforce a contract to assign an expectancy unless there is a valuable consideration. For example, under a settlement of property the respondent "the son" would have been entitled to an equal portion of properties along with his other siblings which was gained in a settlement by his mother. This portion was only his when allocated to him at his mothers discretion. Prior to this allocation being made, the respondent allotted his benefit to trustees for a voluntary settlement. He was assigning or purporting to assign something which he might become entitled to in the future, not a contingent interest. The judgment held it ineffective and elaborated on previous points to state the respondent cannot be compelled to allow the trustees to retain the appointed sum.

== See also ==
- Assignment of "tethelin" patent to University of California
