= List of United States Supreme Court cases, volume 553 =

This is a list of all the United States Supreme Court cases from volume 553 of the United States Reports:

Case name	Citation	Date decided
United States v. Clintwood Elkhorn Min. Co.	553 U.S. 1	April 15, 2008
A person claiming a refund for an unconstitutional tax must go through the normal administrative procedures for tax refunds before filing a lawsuit against the government.
MeadWestvaco Corp. v. Ill. Dept. of Revenue	553 U.S. 16	2008
Baze v. Rees	553 U.S. 35	2008
Burgess v. United States	553 U.S. 124	2008
The definition of "serious drug felony" for the purposes of sentencing under the Controlled Substances Act does not include "misdemeanor" and "felony" in any non-federal jurisdiction.
Begay v. United States	553 U.S. 137	2008
Felony driving while intoxicated is not a “violent felony” within meaning of section of the Armed Career Criminal Act imposing special mandatory 15-year prison term upon felons who unlawfully possess a firearm and who have three or more convictions for violent felonies.
Virginia v. Moore	553 U.S. 164	2008
A warrantless arrest for driving with a suspended license was reasonable under the Fourth Amendment even though the arrest was not permitted under state law, so the fruits of the search incident to that arrest were admissible.
Crawford v. Marion County Election Board	553 U.S. 181	2008
A statute requiring voters to show a picture ID is constitutional.
Gonzalez v. United States	553 U.S. 242	2008
The right to have a district judge preside over jury selection can be waived by counsel, allowing a magistrate judge to serve as a substitute.
United States v. Ressam	553 U.S. 272	2008
An person who possessed explosives "during" the commission of another crime is eligible for a mandatory 10-year sentence on top of any other sentence even if the explosives were not related to the crime they committed.
United States v. Williams	553 U.S. 285	2008
Federal statute prohibiting the pandering of child pornography was not unconstitutionally overbroad, because there is no First Amendment protection for offering to engage in illegal transactions.
Dept. of Revenue v. Davis	553 U.S. 328	2008
A state exempting the interest on its bonds from residents' taxable income while taxing the interest earned on the bonds of other states is not unconstitutional discrimination under the Dormant Commerce Clause.
United States v. Rodriquez	553 U.S. 377	2008
A Washington state drug-trafficking conviction, for which the maximum term was 10 years under the state recidivist provision, qualifies as "a serious drug offense" under the Armed Career Criminal Act.
Riley v. Kennedy	553 U.S. 406	2008
A court's order resolving liability without addressing a plaintiff's requests for relief is not a final judgment.
CBOCS West, Inc. v. Humphries	553 U.S. 442	2008
42 U.S.C. §1981 encompasses retaliation claims based on racial employment discrimination.
Gomez-Perez v. Potter	553 U.S. 474	2008
Federal employees who face retaliation after filing an age discrimination claim are authorized to sue under the federal-sector provision of the Age Discrimination in Employment Act of 1967.
United States v. Santos	553 U.S. 507	2008
The rule of lenity requires that the federal money-laundering statute's use of the inherently-ambiguous term "proceeds" be read in the light favorable to the accused. Here, that means it includes "profit" and not "receipts."
Regalado Cuellar v. United States	553 U.S. 550	2008
The federal money-laundering statute contains no "legitimate wealth" requirement, and mere proof that the defendant was attempting to conceal the money is not enough to uphold a conviction.
Richlin Sec. Serv. Co. v. Chertoff	553 U.S. 571	2008
A prevailing party that satisfies the Equal Access to Justice Act's other requirements may recover its paralegal fees from the Government at prevailing market rates.
Engquist v. Or. Dept. of Agric.	553 U.S. 591	2008
The class-of-one theory of equal protection does not apply in the public employment context.
Quanta Computer, Inc. v. LG Electronics, Inc.	553 U.S. 617	2008
Patent license language insufficient to create limited license and avoid effect of exhaustion doctrine; exhaustion doctrine applies to method claims and to authorized sale of article that substantially embodies claimed invention.
Bridge v. Phoenix Bond & Indemnity Co.	553 U.S. 639	2008
A RICO plaintiff asserting a claim predicated on mail fraud does not need to show that that plaintiff relied on the defendant's alleged misrepresentations.
Allison Engine Co. v. United States ex rel. Sanders	553 U.S. 662	2008
Plaintiffs under the False Claims Act must demonstrate that the defendants intended to deceive the government, not simply that government money was used to pay the claim.
Munaf v. Geren	553 U.S. 674	2008
Habeas corpus statute extends to American citizens held overseas by American forces operating subject to an American chain of command, even when those forces are acting as part of a multinational coalition.
Irizarry v. United States	553 U.S. 708	2008
Federal Rule of Criminal Procedure 32(h) does not apply to a variance from a recommended Federal Sentencing Guidelines range; that rule applies only to "departures."
Boumediene v. Bush	553 U.S. 723	2008
Foreign terrorism suspects held at the Guantanamo Bay Naval Base in Cuba have constitutional rights to challenge their detention in United States courts. Section 7 of the Military Commissions Act of 2006 is unconstitutional.
Republic of Philippines v. Pimentel	553 U.S. 851	2008
Foreign sovereigns are "indispensable parties" under Rule 19 of the Federal Rules of Civil Procedure.
Taylor v. Sturgell	553 U.S. 880	2008
A "virtually represented" non-party cannot be bound by a judgment.
