= Rowe v. New Hampshire Motor Transport Association =

- Supreme Court of the United States

Decided November 28, 2007
- Full case name: Rowe v. New Hampshire Motor Transport Association
- Citations: 552 U.S. 364 (more)

Holding
- Federal law preempts state law that would control the commercial delivery of tobacco and other products harmful to children.

Court membership
- Chief Justice John Roberts Associate Justices John P. Stevens · Antonin Scalia; Anthony Kennedy · David Souter; Clarence Thomas · Ruth Bader Ginsburg; Stephen Breyer · Samuel Alito

Case opinions
- Majority: Breyer
- Concurrence: Ginsburg
- Concurrence: Scalia (in part)

Rowe v. New Hampshire Motor Transport Association, 552 U.S. 364 (2007), was a United States Supreme Court case in which the court held that federal law preempts state law that would control the commercial delivery of tobacco and other products harmful to children.

== Background ==
Although a provision of the Federal Aviation Administration Authorization Act of 1994 forbids states to "enact or enforce a law... related to a price, route, or service of any motor carrier." Maine adopted a law which, among other things, (1) specifies that a state-licensed tobacco shipper must use a delivery company that provides a recipient-verification service that confirms the buyer is of legal age, and (2) adds, in prohibiting unlicensed tobacco shipments into the state, that a person is deemed to know that a package contains tobacco if it is marked as originating from a Maine-licensed tobacco retailer or if it is received from someone whose name appears on an official list of unlicensed tobacco retailers distributed to package-delivery companies. In the carrier associations' suit, the federal district court and the First Circuit Court of Appeals agreed with the carrier association that Maine's recipient-verification and deemed-to-know provisions were pre-empted by federal law.

== Opinion of the court ==
The Supreme Court issued an opinion on November 28, 2007.
