= List of United States Supreme Court cases, volume 552 =

This is a list of all the United States Supreme Court cases from volume 552 (2007–2008) of the United States Reports:

| Case name | Citation | Date decided |
|---|---|---|
| New York City Board of Education v. Tom F. | 552 U.S. 1 | 2007 |
The judgment is affirmed by an equally divided Court.
| Allen v. Siebert | 552 U.S. 3 | 2007 |
Because Siebert's petition for state postconviction relief was rejected as untimely by the Alabama courts, it was not "properly filed" under §2244(d)(2). Accordingly, he was not entitled to tolling of AEDPA’s 1-year statute of limitations.
| CSX Transp., Inc. v. Ga. State Bd. of Equalization | 552 U.S. 9 | 2007 |
The 4–R Act allows a railroad to attempt to show that state methods for determining the value of railroad property result in a discriminatory determination of true market value.
| Logan v. United States | 552 U.S. 23 | 2007 |
The "civil rights restored" exemption of convictions for sentence-enhancement purposes did not extend to a defendant who retained his civil rights at all times, and whose post-conviction legal status remained in all respects unaltered by any state dispensation.
| Gall v. United States | 552 U.S. 38 | 2007 |
The federal appeals courts may not presume that a sentence falling outside the range recommended by the Federal Sentencing Guidelines is unreasonable.
| Watson v. United States | 552 U.S. 74 | 2007 |
Smith v. United States (1993) holds that one "uses" a gun by giving it in exchange for drugs. A transaction in the opposite direction does not violate the same statute (one does not "use" a gun by receiving it in exchange for drugs).
| Kimbrough v. United States | 552 U.S. 85 | 2007 |
The Federal Sentencing Guidelines for cocaine are advisory only, and a judge may consider the disparity between the Guidelines' treatment of crack and powder cocaine offenses when "imposing a sentence sufficient, but not greater than necessary."
| Arave v. Hoffman | 552 U.S. 117 | 2008 |
The court granted an agreed Motion to Vacate Decision Below and Dismiss the Cause as Moot.
| Wright v. Van Patten | 552 U.S. 120 | 2008 |
There is no clearly established law contrary to the state court's conclusion that the defendant was not prejudiced by their defense attorney's telephonic appearance in a hearing. Therefore, there are not grounds justifying collateral relief.
| John R. Sand & Gravel Co. v. United States | 552 U.S. 130 | 2008 |
An action in the Court of Claims must always be timely, even if the government has waived timeliness.
| Stoneridge Inv. Partners, LLC v. Scientific-Atlanta, Inc. | 552 U.S. 148 | 2008 |
The private right of action under §10(b) of the Securities Exchange Act of 1934 does not extend to aiders and abettors. Because the conduct of a secondary actor must therefore satisfy each of the elements for §10(b) liability, the plaintiff must prove reliance upon a material misrepresentation or omission by the defendant.
| Knight v. Comm'r | 552 U.S. 181 | 2008 |
Investment advisory fees generally are subject to the 2% tax-deductibility floor when incurred by a trust.
| N.Y. State Bd. of Elections v. Lopez Torres | 552 U.S. 196 | 2008 |
The court upheld New York's party-based judicial election laws.
| Ali v. Fed. Bureau of Prisons | 552 U.S. 214 | 2008 |
The United States cannot be sued for failing to return property when the loss is caused by any law enforcement officer.
| LaRue v. DeWolff, Boberg & Associates, Inc. | 552 U.S. 248 | 2008 |
Although ERISA does not provide a remedy for individual injuries distinct from plan injuries, it does authorize someone with a retirement account to recover from an account manager who commits fiduciary breaches that impair the value of plan assets in that person's individual account.
| Danforth v. Minnesota | 552 U.S. 264 | 2008 |
State courts can retroactively apply a new constitutional rule of criminal procedure by applying state law retroactivity standards that are broader than Teague v. Lane.
| Riegel v. Medtronic, Inc. | 552 U.S. 312 | 2008 |
The MDA's pre-emption clause bars common-law claims challenging the safety or effectiveness of a medical device marketed in a form that received premarket approval from the FDA.
| Preston v. Ferrer | 552 U.S. 346 | 2008 |
When all parties to a contract agree to arbitrate their disputes, this also covers disputes which state law requires be referred to an administrative agency.
| Rowe v. N.H. Motor Transp. Ass'n | 552 U.S. 364 | 2008 |
Federal law preempts state law that would control the commercial delivery of tobacco and other products harmful to children.
| Sprint/United Management Co. v. Mendelsohn | 552 U.S. 379 | 2008 |
Whether "me too" evidence of discrimination offered by co-workers in support of a claim against the employer is relevant in an individual ADEA case is fact based and depends on many factors; it is not appropriate for reviewing courts to apply per se rules about their admissibility or inadmissibility.
| Federal Express Corp. v. Holowecki | 552 U.S. 389 | 2008 |
The documents filed did qualify as a charge, as they could be reasonably construed as a request for the agency to take action.
| Boulware v. United States | 552 U.S. 421 | 2008 |
A distributee accused of criminal tax evasion may claim return-of-capital treatment without producing evidence that, when the distribution occurred, either they or the corporation intended to return the capital.
| Warner-Lambert Co. v. Kent | 552 U.S. 440 | 2008 |
Judgment was affirmed by an equally divided Court.
| Wash. State Grange v. Wash. State Republican Party | 552 U.S. 442 | 2008 |
Washington's top-two primary system does not infringe upon smaller political parties' associational rights.
| Snyder v. Louisiana | 552 U.S. 472 | 2008 |
The prosecutor's use of peremptory strikes to remove African American jurors violated the Court's earlier holding in Batson v. Kentucky.
| Medellín v. Texas | 552 U.S. 491 | 2008 |
Neither Case Concerning Avena and Other Mexican Nationals (Mex. v. U.S.), 2004 I.C.J. 12 (Judgment of Mar. 31) nor the President's Memorandum to the Attorney General (Feb. 28, 2005) constitutes an enforceable federal law that pre-empts state limitations on the filing of habeas corpus petitions.
| Hall Street Assoc., L.L.C. v. Mattel, Inc. | 552 U.S. 576 | 2008 |
State and federal courts cannot, on a motion to vacate or modify an arbitration award, apply standards agreed to by the parties that expand the scope of judicial review under the Federal Arbitration Act.
| New Jersey v. Delaware | 552 U.S. 597 | 2008 |
A 1905 agreement between the two states did not grant New Jersey exclusive jurisdiction over riparian improvements near New Jersey, but on the Delaware side of the border.
