= Engquist v. Oregon Department of Agriculture =

- Supreme Court of the United States

Decided June 9, 2008
- Full case name: Engquist v. Oregon Department of Agriculture
- Citations: 553 U.S. 591 (more)

Holding
- The class-of-one theory of equal protection does not apply in the public employment context.

Court membership
- Chief Justice John Roberts Associate Justices John P. Stevens · Antonin Scalia; Anthony Kennedy · David Souter; Clarence Thomas · Ruth Bader Ginsburg; Stephen Breyer · Samuel Alito

Case opinions
- Majority: Roberts, joined by Scalia, Kennedy, Thomas, Breyer, Alito
- Dissent: Stevens, joined by Souter, Ginsburg

Engquist v. Oregon Department of Agriculture, 553 U.S. 591 (2008), was a United States Supreme Court case in which the court held that the class-of-one theory of equal protection does not apply in the public employment context.

== Background ==
Engquist, an Oregon public employee working for the Oregon Department of Agriculture, filed suit against her agency, her supervisor, and a co-worker asserting, among other things, claims under the Equal Protection Clause: She alleged she had been discriminated against based on her race, sex, and national origin. She also brought a so-called "class-of-one" claim, alleging that she was fired not because she was a member of an identified class (unlike her race, sex, and national origin claims), but simply for arbitrary, vindictive, and malicious reasons. The jury rejected the class-membership equal protection claims but found for Engquist on her class-of-one claim. The Ninth Circuit Court of Appeals reversed in relevant part. Although recognizing that the Supreme Court had upheld a class-of-one equal protection challenge to state legislative and regulatory action in Village of Willowbrook v. Olech, 528 U. S. 562, the Ninth Circuit emphasized that the Supreme Court has routinely afforded government greater leeway when it acts as employer rather than regulator. For this reason, the Ninth Circuit found that applying the “class of one” doctrine to the public employment situation would constitute judicial intervention in the affairs of states regarding employment policies.

== Opinion of the court ==
The Supreme Court issued an opinion on June 9, 2008.

The majority ruled that a "class of one" in an employment context is completely unrealistic. The government would turn every single employment grievance into a judicial issue. Stating "The federal court is not the appropriate forum in which to review the multitude of personnel decisions that are made daily by public agencies.
