= Miller v. Alabama =

- Supreme Court of the United States

Argued March 19, 2012 Decided June 25, 2012
- Full case name: Evan Miller, Petitioner v. Alabama; Kuntrell Jackson, Petitioner v. Ray Hobbs, Director, Arkansas Department of Correction
- Docket nos.: 10-9646; 10-9647
- Citations: 567 U.S. 460 (more) 132 S. Ct. 2455; 183 L. Ed. 2d 407

Case history
- Prior: Conviction affirmed sub nom. Miller v. State, 2010 WL 2546422 (Ala. Crim. App. June 25, 2010); rehearing denied, and new decision published, 63 So.3d 676 (Ala. Crim. App. August 27, 2010); certiorari denied sub nom. Ex parte Miller, unpub. n°1091663 (Ala. October 22, 2010); certiorari granted, 565 U. S. 1013 (2011). Conviction affirmed sub nom. Jackson v. State, 359 Ark. 87, 194 S.W.3d 757 (2004); petition for habeas relief dismissed, unpub. n°cv-08-28-2 (Jefferson Cnty Cir. Ct.); affirmed, 2011 Ark. 49, 378 S. W. 3d 103 (2011); certiorari granted, 565 U. S. 1013 (2011)

Holding
- The Eighth Amendment prohibits a sentencing scheme that requires life in prison without the possibility of parole for juvenile homicide offenders.

Court membership
- Chief Justice John Roberts Associate Justices Antonin Scalia · Anthony Kennedy; Clarence Thomas · Ruth Bader Ginsburg; Stephen Breyer · Samuel Alito; Sonia Sotomayor · Elena Kagan

Case opinions
- Majority: Kagan, joined by Kennedy, Ginsburg, Breyer, Sotomayor
- Concurrence: Breyer, joined by Sotomayor
- Dissent: Roberts, joined by Scalia, Thomas, Alito
- Dissent: Thomas, joined by Scalia
- Dissent: Alito, joined by Scalia

Laws applied
- U.S. Const. Amend. VIII

Miller v. Alabama, 567 U.S. 460 (2012), was a United States Supreme Court case in which the Court held that mandatory sentences of life imprisonment without the possibility of parole are unconstitutional for juvenile offenders. The ruling applied even to those persons who had committed murder as a juvenile, extending beyond Graham v. Florida (2010), which had ruled juvenile life without parole sentences unconstitutional for crimes excluding murder.

== Background ==
The decision of the court was based on two consolidated cases, Jackson v. Hobbs, No. 10-9647, and Miller v. Alabama, No. 10-9646. The Los Angeles Times wrote: "In one case that came before the court, Kuntrell Jackson was 14 in November 18, 1999 when he and two other teenagers went to a video store in Arkansas planning to rob it. He stayed outside, and one of the youths pulled a gun and killed the store clerk. Jackson had waited outside the store for a time, but entered shortly before Derrick Shields shot the store clerk. There is debate as to whether he told the clerk, "We ain't playin'" or whether he said to his accomplices, "I thought you all was playin'." Jackson was not the shooter. Jackson was charged as an adult and given a life term with no parole.

In the second case, Evan Miller, a 14-year-old from Alabama, was convicted of a July 15, 2003, murder after he and another boy set fire to a trailer where they had bought drugs from a neighbor. Miller committed homicide in the act of robbing his neighbor, Cole Cannon. Cannon had fallen asleep after he, Miller, and Miller's friend Colby Smith had indulged in alcohol and marijuana. Cannon awoke as Miller was replacing Cannon's wallet, and Smith hit Cannon with a baseball bat. Miller took up the bat and proceeded to severely beat Cannon. Smith and Miller later returned to destroy the evidence of what they had done by setting fire to Cannon's trailer. Cannon died of severe injuries and smoke inhalation. On October 20, 2006, Miller was given a life term with no parole, while Smith received life with parole on October 27, 2006.

== Opinion of the Court ==
=== Majority opinion ===
Justice Elena Kagan wrote for the majority of the court "that mandatory life without parole for those under age of 18 at the time of their crime violates the 8th Amendment’s prohibition on cruel and unusual punishments". Justice Kagan said:

Mandatory life without parole for a juvenile precludes consideration of his chronological age and its hallmark features – among them, immaturity, impetuosity, and failure to appreciate risks and consequences. It prevents taking into account the family and home environment that surrounds him – and from which he cannot usually extricate himself – no matter how brutal or dysfunctional.

In addition to empirical debates about adolescent development, some scholars have raised normative worries about rooting constitutional limits on juvenile punishment primarily in developmental psychology. One line of criticism argues that focus on developmental claims about diminished culpability rely on coarse generalizations and risk obscuring the political and legal status, or lack thereof, of children. On this view, the limits of life without parole are better justified by the democratic obligations incurred when the state exercises coercive authority over individuals who lack full political standing, rather than by developmental immaturity alone.

=== Dissents ===
Chief Justice John Roberts voiced in his dissent the opinion that mandatory life sentences "could not plausibly be described" as unusual when a majority of states endorse them. He wrote: "Determining the appropriate sentence for a teenager convicted of murder presents grave and challenging questions of morality and social policy. Our role, however, is to apply the law, not to answer such questions." A separate dissent was filed by Justice Samuel Alito. Alito wrote of the consequences of the majority ruling:

Even a 17 1/2-year-old who sets off a bomb in a crowded mall or guns down a dozen students and teachers is a 'child' and must be given a chance to persuade a judge to permit his release into society. Nothing in the Constitution supports this arrogation of legislative authority.

The holding of the court applies retroactively to all those convicted of crimes committed under 18. It does not automatically free any prisoner, and it does not forbid sentences of life terms for young murderers. Instead judges in their review have to consider the defendant's youth, mitigating factors, and the nature of the crime before sentencing the defendant to imprisonment with no hope for parole.

The case was remanded to the trial court for the convicted youths to be re-sentenced.

== Retroactivity ==
In Montgomery v. Louisiana (2016), the Supreme Court determined that Miller v. Alabama must be applied retroactively. The petitioner, Henry Montgomery, has been in prison since 1963 for a murder he committed at the age of 17. The Court said that states could undertake re-sentencing, or offer parole to inmates sentenced to life as minors. Up to 2,300 cases nationwide were estimated to be affected by the ruling.

Another case affected by the ruling would be the sentence that Lee Boyd Malvo received for his role in the D.C. sniper attacks, with a judge making a ruling similar to Montgomery v. Louisiana. Malvo's trial progress had earlier been affected by Roper v. Simmons, which took the death penalty out of play for Malvo, who had been charged with capital murder. The Supreme Court had granted the case Mathena v. Malvo in March 2019, and heard oral argument in October 2019. However, a change in Virginia law rendered the case moot.

A year later, the Supreme Court granted a related case, Jones v. Mississippi, involving a person who had killed his grandfather when he was 15 in 2004 and given the mandatory sentence of life without parole. Due to the reactive rulings in Miller and Montgomery, Jones was given a rehearing but was still resentenced to life in prison, and appealed, claiming the court did not evaluate any aspect of his incorrigibility as required under Montgomery. Oral hearings were held on November 3, 2020. On April 22, 2021, the US Supreme Court affirmed the judgment of the Mississippi Court of Appeals.

Kuntrell Jackson was released from prison on February 21, 2017.

== Subsequent developments ==
Miller was given a resentencing hearing in 2017, however it was not until April 2021 that a verdict had been reached with him being resentenced to life without parole. Miller is now trying to appeal his resentencing verdict.

While life sentences are prohibited, de facto life sentences are permitted in selected jurisdictions, as the South Carolina Supreme Court ruled on April 3, 2019, in the case of State of South Carolina v. Conrad Lamont Slocumb. Slocumb was 13 in 1992 when he kidnapped and sexually assaulted a woman in Orangeburg, S.C., shooting her in the face and head five times (she survived). He was sentenced to thirty years in prison for that offence. While an inmate at the Department of Juvenile Justice, the then 16-year old Slocumb escaped from a corrections officer while being treated in a Columbia hospital, charging into an apartment and raping another woman, stealing jewelry from her apartment. Slocumb was given a life without parole sentence for burglary under Section 17-25-45 of the South Carolina Code, thirty years in prison for the first kidnapping, thirty years for criminal sexual conduct in the first degree, fifteen years for robbery, and five years for escaping, all served consecutively. After the Graham and Miller decisions, the life sentence was changed to a fifty-year sentence. The state noted Slocumb had failed to complete any educational courses or enroll in any rehabilitative programs while incarcerated. The state Supreme Court noted the seriousness of Slocumb's two crimes, and his adult behaviour in prison, ruling that Graham and Miller do not prohibit aggregate sentences for multiple offenses equivalent to a life sentence on a juvenile nonhomicide offender. Slocumb's sentence is a total of 130 years, which he claims is a de facto life sentence.

=== Jones v. Mississippi ===
In 2021, the Supreme Court held in Jones v. Mississippi that, when a minor commits a homicide, Miller and Montgomery v. Louisiana do not require the sentencing judge to make a separate factual finding of "permanent incorrigibility" before sentencing the defendant to life without parole. In such a case, a discretionary sentencing system is both constitutionally necessary and constitutionally sufficient.
