= Lopez v. Gonzales =

- Supreme Court of the United States

Argued October 3, 2006 Decided December 5, 2006
- Full case name: Jose Antonio Lopez v. Alberto Gonzales, Attorney General of the United States
- Docket no.: 05-547
- Citations: 549 U.S. 47 (more) 127 S. Ct. 625; 166 L. Ed. 2d 462; 2006 U.S. LEXIS 9442
- Argument: Oral argument

Case history
- Prior: Order of removal affirmed by the Board of Immigration Appeals; petition denied, 417 F.3d 934 (8th Cir. 2005); cert. granted, 547 U.S. ___ (2005)

Holding
- Conduct that is a misdemeanor under the federal Controlled Substances Act is not a "felony punishable under the Controlled Substances Act," and hence an aggravated felony that makes an eligible for deportation, even if that conduct constitutes a felony under state law.

Court membership
- Chief Justice John Roberts Associate Justices John P. Stevens · Antonin Scalia; Anthony Kennedy · David Souter; Clarence Thomas · Ruth Bader Ginsburg; Stephen Breyer · Samuel Alito

Case opinions
- Majority: Souter, joined by Roberts, Stevens, Scalia, Kennedy, Ginsburg, Breyer, Alito
- Dissent: Thomas

Laws applied
- 8 U.S.C. § 1101(a)(43)(B); 18 U.S.C. § 924(c)(2)

Lopez v. Gonzales, 549 U.S. 47 (2006), held that an "aggravated felony" includes only conduct punishable as a felony under the federal Controlled Substances Act, regardless of whether state law classifies such conduct as a felony or a misdemeanor. Under federal law, there are two main consequences of having a prior conviction for an "aggravated felony." One is that, if the convicted person is an alien, he will be deported. The other is that, with respect to certain federal crimes, a prior conviction for an aggravated felony provides a sentencing enhancement. In this case, Lopez had been convicted of conduct that was a felony under South Dakota law but was a misdemeanor under federal law. Accordingly, the U.S. Supreme Court ruled that this conviction could not serve as a basis for deporting him.

== Background ==
Lopez entered the United States illegally from Mexico in 1986, but became a lawful permanent resident in 1990. In 1997, he pleaded guilty to aiding and abetting the possession of cocaine in a South Dakota court, and served 15 months in prison. When he was released, the INS sought to deport him because, it claimed, he had been convicted of a controlled substances violation and an "aggravated felony." An Immigration Judge ordered him deported, and the Board of Immigration Appeals ultimately affirmed that decision. Lopez petitioned for review in the Eighth Circuit, which the court denied. Because there was a conflict in the federal courts of appeals on how to classify crimes such as Lopez's, the Supreme Court agreed to hear the case.

== Opinion of the Court ==
Justice Souter wrote for the majority. As is frequently the case with regard to immigration cases, the Court had to examine the interplay of federal and state laws that are complex in their phrasing. Under the Immigration and Nationality Act (INA), an aggravated felony includes "illicit trafficking in a controlled substance... including a drug trafficking crime (as defined in section 924(c) of Title 18)." 8 U.S.C. § 1101(a)(43)(B). A "drug trafficking crime," in turn, refers to "any felony punishable under the Controlled Substances Act [the CSA] (21 U.S.C. § 801 et seq.)." The term "aggravated felony" "applies to an offense whether in violation of Federal or State law and applies to such an offense in violation of the law of a foreign country for which the term of imprisonment was completed within the previous 15 years."

Under South Dakota law, aiding and abetting the possession of cocaine is equivalent to possessing cocaine, and that crime is a felony. Mere possession is not a felony under the CSA unless the amount of the drug possessed is greater than that normally kept for personal use. Where federal law treats certain conduct as a misdemeanor, and state law treats that same conduct as a felony, does that conduct constitute an "aggravated felony" or not? To answer this question, the Court had to parse the phrase "any felony punishable under the Controlled Substances Act."

The Government argued that Lopez's South Dakota conviction qualified as an aggravated felony because it was (1) a felony, because South Dakota law made it a felony; that (2) was punishable under the CSA, because it is a crime under the CSA to possess a controlled substance, albeit a misdemeanor. This interpretation ignored the fact that to qualify as an "aggravated felony," the crime in question had to relate to trafficking in a controlled substance. Possession is not trafficking, the Court reasoned, because possession lacks a connection to commerce. "Reading § 924(c) the Government's way, then, would turn simple possession into trafficking, just what the English language tells us not to expect, and that result makes us very wary of the Government's position."

As the INA provides, all "felonies punishable under the Controlled Substances Act" are drug trafficking crimes; thus, the place to go to determine what crimes are "felonies punishable under the Controlled Substances Act" is the Act itself. The term "aggravated felony" is one of federal law, and the Supreme Court is the ultimate arbiter of the meaning of federal law, including the meaning of words Congress uses when it crafts statutes. Congress could have expressly relied on state law to classify crimes as aggravated felonies. Since it did not, the Court reasoned, the class of crimes that constitute aggravated felonies must be defined in federal law. Hence, "unless a state offense is punishable as a federal felony it does not count" as an "aggravated felony."

In the Court's opinion, Government's gloss on the statutory phrase was not consistent with ordinary English usage. Because the words "punishable under the Controlled Substances Act" followed directly after the word "punishable," the Court reasoned that the most sensible meaning of the phrase was "a felony punishable as such by the Controlled Substances Act."

The Government pointed out that the term "aggravated felony" applies to any offense "whether in violation of Federal or State law." This qualification, it argued, showed that Congress intended for state law to determine whether conduct qualified as an aggravated felony. The Court read this language in the opposite way the Government did. But this gloss would "wrench[] the expectations raised by normal English usage." This qualifying language "confirms that a state offense whose elements include the elements of a felony punishable under the CSA is an aggravated felony." Furthermore, the fact that the Government had never prosecuted anyone under § 924(c) where the underlying "drug trafficking crime" was a state felony but a federal misdemeanor belied the Government's interpretation. Moreover, the Government's interpretation would make federal immigration law dependent on the vagaries of state criminal law, at least with respect to alien removal and eligibility for asylum. If Congress had meant the term "aggravated felony" to bear some generic meaning, and thus to depend to some extent on state law, it would not have expressly referenced another federal statute, such as § 924(c), in defining this category of aggravated felony. Put another way, it was not clear that Congress intended that a state conviction for felony possession of up to 30 grams of marijuana—a crime treated as a misdemeanor under federal law—should count as an aggravated felony while a state conviction for misdemeanor possession of 5 grams of cocaine—a crime treated as a felony under federal law—should not.

=== Dissenting opinion ===
Justice Thomas accepted the Government's interpretation of the phrase "felony punishable under the Controlled Substances Act." Because Lopez's crime was a felony under South Dakota law, and the CSA provided for punishment for his crime, he had committed an aggravated felony. "The classification [of a crime as a felony or a misdemeanor] depends only on the authorized term of imprisonment."

== Later developments ==
In Carachuri-Rosendo v. Holder, the Supreme Court clarified that "aggravated felony" does not mean "any conduct punishable as a felony." In that case, the lower courts read Lopez as authorization for a "hypothetical approach" where the immigration court could find that an act was an aggravated felony if the state prosecutor could have hypothetically charged the conduct under a felony statute. The Supreme Court said that Lopez did not authorize any hypothetical approach. The determination of whether a conviction was an aggravated felony much be made based on what the person was actually convicted of.

== See also ==
- Burgess v. United States: state misdemeanor conviction that would be a federal felony
