= Edwards v. Vannoy =

- Supreme Court of the United States

Argued December 2, 2020 Decided May 17, 2021
- Full case name: Thedrick Edwards v. Darrel Vannoy, Warden
- Docket no.: 19-5807
- Citations: 593 U.S. 255 (more) 141 S. Ct. 1547; 209 L. Ed. 2d 651

Case history
- Prior: Convictions and sentences affirmed, State v. Edwards, 2008–2011 (La. App. 1 Cir. 6/12/09), 11 So. 3d 1242; Writ denied, 2009–1612 (La. 12/17/10), 51 So. 3d 27; Habeas corpus petition dismissed, Edwards v. Cain, No. 3:15-cv-00305, 2018 WL 4373644 (M.D. La. Sept. 13, 2018); Appeal denied, Edwards v. Vannoy, No. 18-31095, 2019 WL 8643258 (5th Cir. May 20, 2019); Certiorari granted, 140 S. Ct. 2737 (2020)

Holding
- The Ramos jury-unanimity rule does not apply retroactively on federal collateral review.

Court membership
- Chief Justice John Roberts Associate Justices Clarence Thomas · Stephen Breyer; Samuel Alito · Sonia Sotomayor; Elena Kagan · Neil Gorsuch; Brett Kavanaugh · Amy Coney Barrett

Case opinions
- Majority: Kavanaugh, joined by Roberts, Thomas, Alito, Gorsuch, Barrett
- Concurrence: Thomas, joined by Gorsuch
- Concurrence: Gorsuch, joined by Thomas
- Dissent: Kagan, joined by Breyer, Sotomayor
- This case overturned a previous ruling or rulings
- Teague v. Lane (1989) (in part)

Edwards v. Vannoy, 593 U.S. 255 (2021), was a United States Supreme Court case involving the Court's prior decision in Ramos v. Louisiana, 590 U.S. 83 (2020), which had ruled that jury verdicts in criminal trials must be unanimous under the Sixth Amendment to the U.S. Constitution. The Supreme Court ruled 6–3 that Ramos did not apply retroactively to earlier cases prior to their verdict in Ramos.

== Background ==
Under the Sixth Amendment to the U.S. Constitution, a person accused of criminal charges must be tried by a jury. Federal laws required the jury to come to a unanimous decision to achieve conviction, but states had been free to adapt their own requirements for conviction based on the 1972 case Apodaca v. Oregon. Only Louisiana and Oregon allowed non-unanimous convictions.

A fractured court overturned Apodaca in Ramos v. Louisiana, deciding that the Sixth Amendment right to a unanimous jury verdict applied to the states, at least for felony convictions. Six justices agreed that Apodaca should be overturned but did not decide whether the decision would apply retroactively to cases on federal collateral review.

== Case history ==
Thedrick Edwards and an accomplice kidnapped LSU student Ryan Eaton at gunpoint in Baton Rogue, Louisiana, on May 13, 2006. They drove to an ATM but Eaton had no money in his accounts. They decided to go to his apartment where they blindfolded him, tied his hands and stole some of his personal belongings. Back in the car, they made Eaton arrange a meeting with his girlfriend. They went to her apartment and forced Eaton to knock on the door at gunpoint. When she opened the door the assailants rushed into the apartment. Eaton's girlfriend was there with her friend and roommate. Two of the women were raped. Two days later a pair of men forced their way into another man's car at gunpoint, drove to an ATM and robbed him. Police obtained a warrant to search Edward's residence and arrest him. Edwards turned himself in after police executed the search warrant. His confession was videotaped.

Edwards was convicted in 2007 in Louisiana on charges of rape, armed robbery, and kidnapping. Edwards is black and the victims were white college students. The jury was 10–2 on some counts and 11–1 on others. The only black juror voted to acquit on all charges. Adam Liptak noted that prosecutors used 10 of 11 peremptory challenges to strike black jurors.

After Edwards's conviction became final in March 2011 he filed for federal habeas relief based on his constitutional right to a unanimous jury. His petition was denied based on Apodaca. The Fifth Circuit Court of Appeals agreed with the District Court.

Edwards filed a petition for certiorari at the United States Supreme Court before Ramos was decided. He subsequently changed his petition to the Court to ask whether the Ramos decision should apply retroactively. The Court granted certiorari to Edwards' revised petition in May 2020 on the limited question of whether Ramos v. Louisiana applied retroactively to cases on federal collateral review.

== Oral arguments ==
Oral arguments were heard on December 2, 2020, via teleconference due to the ongoing COVID-19 pandemic. The Louisiana Solicitor General argued that retroactive application of Ramos would require re-trial for thousands of cases "that involve terrible crimes" and would be unfair to the victims. Edwards attorney argued that the case fell within the watershed exception to the Teague doctrine that otherwise foreclosed retroactive applicability of new procedural rules on federal collateral review. The Court has never recognized a "watershed" rule under the Teague doctrine. The right to an attorney established by Gideon v. Wainwright is generally accepted to be a watershed rule but that case was decided before Teague. The defense argued that the Ramos unanimity rule should fall within the "watershed rule" exception because it was comparable to Gideon.

== Supreme Court ==
The Court issued its decision on May 17, 2021. In a 6–3 ruling, the Court affirmed the lower court's ruling. The majority opinion was written by Justice Brett Kavanaugh.

=== Majority opinion ===
Most Supreme Court decisions on new rules of criminal procedure do not have retroactive applicability for finalized convictions on federal collateral review. This 1989 decision Teague v. Lane created an exception for "watershed rules" but the Supreme Court has never applied any procedural rule retroactively under the exception. Justice Kavanaugh wrote for the conservative majority:

It is time—probably long past time—to make explicit what has become increasingly apparent to bench and bar over the last 32 years: New procedural rules do not apply retroactively on federal collateral review. The watershed exception is moribund.

Kavanaugh said the watershed exception was "theoretical" acknowledging that it "never actually applies in practice":

Continuing to articulate a theoretical exception that never actually applies in practice offers false hope to defendants, distorts the law, misleads judges, and wastes the resources of defense counsel, prosecutors, and courts.

In the opinion, Kavanaugh also suggested that it would be impossible for any future change in criminal court proceedings to satisfy the "watershed" exception defined in the Teague ruling. As such, Kavanaugh considered that that portion of the Teague ruling was overturned:

If landmark and historic criminal procedure decisions—including Mapp, Miranda, Duncan, Crawford, Batson, and now Ramos—do not apply retroactively on federal collateral review, how can any additional new rules of criminal procedure apply retroactively on federal collateral review? At this point, some 32 years after Teague, we think the only candid answer is that none can—that is, no new rules of criminal procedure can satisfy the watershed exception. We cannot responsibly continue to suggest otherwise to litigants and courts.

=== Dissent ===
Justice Elena Kagan wrote the dissenting opinion joined by Justices Stephen Breyer and Sonia Sotomayor. Kagan wrote that "those convicted under rules found not to produce fair and reliable verdicts will be left without recourse in federal courts."

Kagan remarked: "If you were scanning the thesaurus for a single word to describe the [Ramos] decision you would stop when you came to watershed."

== Subsequent developments ==
While the Supreme Court opted to not consider the Ramos decision to be retroactive, the Oregon Supreme Court ruled in December 2022 that the Ramos decision should be applied retroactively to cases within the state.

== See also ==
- Danforth v. Minnesota
- Ex post facto law
