= Teague v. Lane =

- Supreme Court of the United States

Argued October 4, 1988 Decided February 22, 1989
- Full case name: Frank Teague v. Michael P. Lane (Director of Illinois Department of Corrections) and Michael O'Leary (Warden of Stateville Correctional Center)
- Citations: 489 U.S. 288 (more) 109 S. Ct. 1060; 103 L. Ed. 2d 334

Case history
- Prior: Habeas corpus petition denied by District Court; reversed, 779 F.2d 1332 (7th Cir. 1985); affirmed on rehearing en banc, 820 F.2d 832 (7th Cir. 1987).
- Subsequent: None

Holding
- In habeas corpus proceedings, only a limited set of important substantive or procedural rights will be enforced retroactively or announced prospectively.

Court membership
- Chief Justice William Rehnquist Associate Justices William J. Brennan Jr. · Byron White; Thurgood Marshall · Harry Blackmun; John P. Stevens · Sandra Day O'Connor; Antonin Scalia · Anthony Kennedy

Case opinions
- Majority: O'Connor, joined by Rehnquist, White, Scalia and Kennedy (Parts I, II, III); Blackmun, Stevens (Part II only)
- Plurality: O'Connor, joined by Rehnquist, Scalia, Kennedy (Parts IV and V)
- Concurrence: White (in part in the judgment)
- Concurrence: Blackmun (in part and in the judgment)
- Concurrence: Stevens (in part and in the judgment), joined by Blackmun (Part I only)
- Dissent: Brennan, joined by Marshall
- Overruled by
- Edwards v. Vannoy (2021) (in part)

Teague v. Lane, 489 U.S. 288 (1989), was a United States Supreme Court case dealing with the application of newly announced rules of law in habeas corpus proceedings. This case addresses the Federal Court's threshold standard of deciding whether Constitutional claims will be heard. Application of the "Teague test" at the most basic level limits habeas corpus.

== Background ==
An all-white jury in Illinois convicted the petitioner, a black man, of three counts of attempted murder, two counts of armed robbery, and one count of aggravated battery. During jury selection, the prosecutor used all 10 of his peremptory challenges against black prospective jurors. Defense counsel moved for a mistrial after six black prospective jurors were struck by the prosecution and objected again after four more, arguing that the petitioner was entitled to a jury of his peers. The trial court denied both motions and found the jury to be fair. On appeal, the petitioner argued that the prosecutor's actions deprived him of a jury representative of the community. The Illinois Appellate Court rejected the argument. The Supreme Court of Illinois denied leave to appeal, and the Supreme Court of the United States denied certiorari.

The petitioner then sought habeas corpus relief in the United States District Court for the Northern District of Illinois, renewing his fair cross-section claim and arguing that recent opinions concerning Swain v. Alabama (1965) warranted reconsideration of the limits on prosecutorial use of peremptory challenges. The district court concluded that it was bound by Swain and controlling circuit precedent. On appeal, a panel of the United States Court of Appeals for the Seventh Circuit found that the petitioner had established a prima facie case of discrimination, but the panel opinion was vacated when the court granted rehearing en banc. On rehearing en banc, the Seventh Circuit found that the intervening decision in Batson v. Kentucky (1986) was unavailable to the petitioner because Allen v. Hardy (1986) had held that Batson did not apply retroactively to cases on collateral review. The court also rejected the petitioner's Swain claim as procedurally barred and reaffirmed that the fair cross-section requirement applied only to the jury venire.

== Opinion of the Court ==
The majority held that the actions of the prosecutor did not follow contemporary criminal procedure but that the Batson challenge principle should not be applied retroactively.

== Subsequent developments ==
In 2020, the Supreme Court ruled in Ramos v. Louisiana that non-unanimous jury verdicts in criminal cases violated the Sixth Amendment right to a jury trial. The Court initially limited the decision to cases on direct review, leaving its application on collateral review for later consideration. That issue arose in Edwards v. Vannoy, which concerned a Louisiana prisoner convicted by a non-unanimous jury. The Supreme Court considered whether the rule announced in Ramos qualified as a watershed rule of criminal procedure under Teague v. Lane and could therefore be applied retroactively on collateral review. Justice Neil Gorsuch questioned whether the Teague v. Lane standard for watershed rules was meaningful, noting that the Court had not found one since 1989.

In Jones v. Mississippi (2021), the Supreme Court reaffirmed that substantive rules apply retroactively on collateral review, while procedural rules generally do not. The Court also clarified that Montgomery v. Louisiana (2016) did not alter the broader framework governing the retroactivity of constitutional rules.
