= Watson v. United States =

- Supreme Court of the United States

Argued October 9, 2007 Decided December 10, 2007
- Full case name: Michael A. Watson, Petitioner v. United States
- Docket no.: 06-571
- Citations: 552 U.S. 74 (more) 128 S. Ct. 579; 169 L. Ed. 2d 472

Case history
- Prior: United States v. Watson, 191 F. App'x 326 (5th Cir. 2006); cert. granted, 549 U.S. 1251 (2007).

Holding
- Smith v. United States (1993) holds that one "uses" a gun by giving it in exchange for drugs. A transaction in the opposite direction does not violate the same statute (one does not "use" a gun by receiving it in exchange for drugs).

Court membership
- Chief Justice John Roberts Associate Justices John P. Stevens · Antonin Scalia; Anthony Kennedy · David Souter; Clarence Thomas · Ruth Bader Ginsburg; Stephen Breyer · Samuel Alito

Case opinions
- Majority: Souter, joined by Roberts, Stevens, Scalia, Kennedy, Thomas, Breyer, Alito
- Concurrence: Ginsburg (in judgment)

Laws applied
- 18 U.S.C. § 924

Watson v. United States, 552 U.S. 74 (2007), is a case decided by the Supreme Court of the United States. The Court had earlier held in Smith v. United States (1993) that the exchange of a gun for drugs constituted "use" of a firearm for purposes of a federal statute imposing penalties for "use" of a firearm "during and in relation to" a drug trafficking crime; in Watson, the court decided that a transaction in the opposite direction does not violate the same statute (i.e., Smith holds that one "uses" a gun by giving it in exchange for drugs, and Watson holds that one does not "use" a gun by receiving it in exchange for drugs).

== Question presented ==
Whether a person who trades his drugs for a gun "uses" a firearm "during and in relation to... (a) drug trafficking crime" within the meaning of 18 U.S.C. 924(c)(1)(A)?

== Ruling ==
Justice Souter delivered the opinion of the Court saying that Smith held that firearms may be "used" in barter transaction, even with no violent employment and that it addressed the trader only, who swaps his gun for drugs, not the trading partner who ends up with the gun. Bailey v. United States (1995), too, does not help because it ruled that a gun must be made use of actively to satisfy 924(c)(1)(A), as "an operative factor in relation to the predicate offense". The majority of the Court held that a person does not "use" a firearm under 924(c)(1)(A) when he receives it in trade for drugs, the Judgment of the Court of Appeals is reversed, and the case was remanded for further proceedings consistent with this opinion.

== Decision and rationale ==
The Fifth Circuit affirmed that receiving a firearm constituted "use" for the purposes. The decision at which the Supreme Court arrived at via unanimous decision was that the momentary possession of the received unloaded semi-automatic pistol was not sufficient to constitute the "use" of the weapon. The rationale behind the Watson situation is that even though there was a firearm present in the transaction, Watson was not carrying it during the transaction. The weapon was unloaded and in his possession for a minimal amount of time. The decision withheld therefore was that Watson's bartering of drugs for the pistol did not constitute the "use" of the weapon due to the fact that the weapon was not loaded, he was not carrying it during the transaction and only had ownership of the firearm for few minutes before being arrested by officials.

== Concurrence ==
Justice Ginsburg delivered the concurrence to the court. She states that she agrees with the opinion of the court but has a different reasoning. Her reasoning is that she defines the word "use" to mean using as a weapon and not in bartering transactions. She also goes on to state that she would overrule Smith, 508 U.S., at 241, and make the precedent both "coherent and consistent with normal usage".

== See also ==
- List of United States Supreme Court cases, volume 389
- Olmstead v. United States, 277 U.S. 438 (1928)
- United States v. U.S. District Court, 407 U.S. 297 (1972)
