= Graham v. Florida =

- Supreme Court of the United States

Argued November 9, 2009 Decided May 17, 2010
- Full case name: Terrance Jamar Graham v. Florida
- Docket no.: 08-7412
- Citations: 560 U.S. 48 (more) 130 S. Ct. 2011; 176 L. Ed. 2d 825
- Argument: Oral argument

Case history
- Procedural: Writ of certiorari to Florida First District Court of Appeal.

Holding
- Sentencing a person to life imprisonment without parole for a non-homicide crime committed before the defendant reached the age of 18 violates the Eighth Amendment.

Court membership
- Chief Justice John Roberts Associate Justices John P. Stevens · Antonin Scalia; Anthony Kennedy · Clarence Thomas; Ruth Bader Ginsburg · Stephen Breyer; Samuel Alito · Sonia Sotomayor

Case opinions
- Majority: Kennedy, joined by Stevens, Ginsburg, Breyer, Sotomayor
- Concurrence: Stevens, joined by Ginsburg, Sotomayor
- Concurrence: Roberts (in judgment)
- Dissent: Thomas, joined by Scalia; Alito (Parts I and III)
- Dissent: Alito

Laws applied
- U.S. Const. Amendment VIII

Graham v. Florida, 560 U.S. 48 (2010), was a decision by the Supreme Court of the United States holding that juvenile offenders cannot be sentenced to life imprisonment without parole for non-homicide offenses.

In June 2012, in the related Miller v. Alabama, the Court ruled that mandatory sentences for life without parole for juvenile offenders, even in cases of murder, was cruel and unusual punishment in violation of the Eighth Amendment to the United States Constitution.

== Background ==
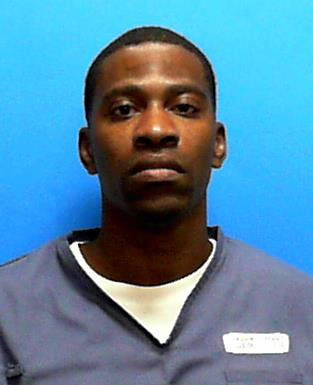
Terrance Jamar Graham

Terrance Jamar Graham (born January 6, 1987), along with two accomplices, attempted to rob a barbecue restaurant in Jacksonville, Florida in July 2003. Aged 16 at the time, Graham was prosecuted as an adult and pleaded guilty to attempted armed robbery and armed burglary with assault or battery, the latter offense carrying a maximum sentence of life imprisonment without parole. He was sentenced to probation.

After Graham violated the terms of his probation, the court revoked his probation and sentenced him to life imprisonment without parole on the original offenses.

=== Legal background ===
By the late 1990s, scientific research increasingly showed that adolescents differed from adults in ways relevant to their treatment in the justice system. This research contributed to a reconsideration of assumptions about juvenile offending and appropriate responses to it. The emerging developmental science also informed the Supreme Court's treatment of juvenile punishment. In Roper v. Simmons (2005), the Court relied in part on these differences in holding that the death penalty could not be imposed for crimes committed by juveniles, building on Thompson v. Oklahoma (1988), which had prohibited the execution of offenders who were younger than 16. For the first time, developmental research concerning differences between adolescents and adults featured prominently in the oral arguments and the Court's decision. Graham v. Florida (2010) extended this reasoning to life imprisonment without parole for juvenile offenders who had not committed homicide.

== Majority opinion ==
Justice Anthony Kennedy delivered the opinion of the Court:

The Constitution prohibits the imposition of a life without parole sentence on a juvenile offender who did not commit homicide. A State need not guarantee the offender eventual release, but if it imposes a sentence of life it must provide him or her with some realistic opportunity to obtain release before the end of that term. The judgment of the First District Court of Appeal of Florida is reversed, and the case is remanded for further proceedings not inconsistent with this opinion.

The Court extended the reasoning of Roper v. Simmons (2005) to juvenile offenders sentenced to life without parole for nonhomicide offenses: “[N]o recent data provide reason to reconsider the Court’s observations in Roper about the nature of juveniles.” The Court took into account the scientific research that demonstrated “fundamental differences between juvenile and adult minds” in Roper, including the continued development of parts of the brain involved in behavioral control through late adolescence.

Emphasizing the severity of life without parole for juvenile nonhomicide offenders, Kennedy pointed to the "capacity for change and limited moral culpability" of juvenile offenders and the importance of "hope" and "reconciliation with society," requiring states to provide "some meaningful opportunity to obtain release based on demonstrated maturity and rehabilitation."

=== Subsequent developments ===
In Miller v. Alabama (2012) and Jackson v. Hobbs (2012), the Supreme Court extended the reasoning of Graham to juvenile homicide offenders and held that mandatory sentences of life imprisonment without parole for juvenile offenders convicted of murder were unconstitutional. At the time the cases were argued, nearly 2,500 people were still serving life sentences for offenses committed as juveniles.

The rule announced in Graham v. Florida was limited to juvenile nonhomicide offenders, leaving most juvenile offenders serving life without parole outside its scope because they had been convicted of homicide. The Court confronted that issue in 2012 in Miller v. Alabama and Jackson v. Hobbs, which concerned 14-year-olds convicted of homicide and sentenced to life without parole. The Court's reasoning continued to rely on the developmental differences between adolescents and adults, while noting that the supporting research had become more extensive since the earlier decisions. The opinion examined this research and concluded that adolescents' developmental immaturity diminished their culpability.

The decisions in Graham, Miller, and related cases left lower courts with several questions about their implementation. One early question was which juvenile offenders could benefit from the decisions, particularly whether Miller applied retroactively. The Supreme Court resolved that question in Montgomery v. Louisiana (2016), holding that Miller's rule applied retroactively to cases on state collateral review. Courts disagreed over whether lengthy term-of-years sentences could effectively constitute life without parole and whether particular parole eligibility provisions satisfied the requirement of a meaningful opportunity for release. These cases also raised whether permanent incorrigibility was necessary for juvenile life without parole, a question the Court addressed in Jones v. Mississippi (2021).

In Jones v. Mississippi, the Court further defined the limits of juvenile sentencing decisions. Justice Brett Kavanaugh concluded that permanent incorrigibility was not required before imposing life without parole on a juvenile offender, emphasizing that, unlike restrictions the Court had previously recognized under the Eighth Amendment, there was no national consensus in legislative enactments and state practice supporting such a requirement.

In February 2012, Terrance Jamar Graham was re-sentenced by the original trial judge to a 25-year sentence and set to be released on August 16, 2025. Graham was incarcerated in the Charlotte Correctional Institution. He was released in February 2024.

== Works cited ==
- Drinan, Cara H. (2021). "Jones v. Mississippi and the Court's Quiet Burial of the Miller Trilogy". Ohio State Journal of Criminal Law. 19: 181.
- Monahan, Kathryn; Steinberg, Laurence; Piquero, Alex R. (September 2015). "Juvenile Justice Policy and Practice: A Developmental Perspective". Crime and Justice. 44 (1): 577–619. doi:10.1086/681553.
