= Duncan McArthur =

American politician (1772–1839)

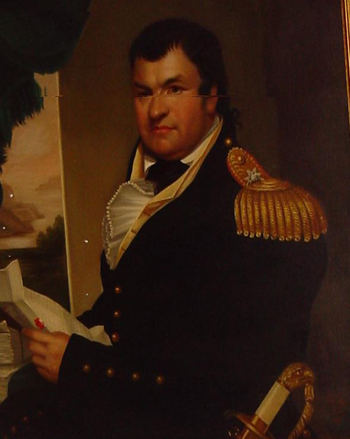

11th Governor of Ohio
- In office December 18, 1830 – December 7, 1832
- Preceded by: Allen Trimble
- Succeeded by: Robert Lucas

Member of the U.S. House of Representatives from Ohio's 6th district
- In office March 4, 1823 – March 3, 1825
- Preceded by: John Sloane
- Succeeded by: John Thomson

Member of the Ohio Senate from Ross, Franklin and Highland counties
- In office 1805–1813; 1821–1823
- Preceded by: Abraham Claypool; Joseph Kerr
- Succeeded by: William Creighton, Sr. James Dunlap (1805–1813); David Crouse (1821–1823)

12th Speaker of the Ohio House of Representatives
- In office December 1, 1817 – December 6, 1818
- Preceded by: Thomas Kirker
- Succeeded by: Joseph Richardson

Member of the Ohio House of Representatives from Ross and Franklin counties
- In office 1804–1805; 1815–1816; 1817–1818

Personal details
- Born: January 14, 1772 or June 14, 1772 Dutchess County, Province of New York, British America
- Died: April 29, 1839 (aged 66–67) Chillicothe, Ohio, U.S.
- Resting place: Grandview Cemetery
- Party: Federalist; National Republican
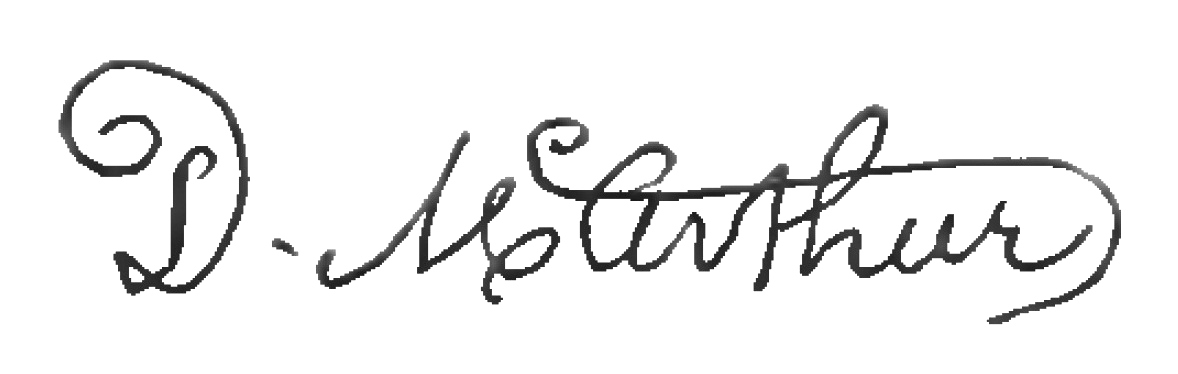
- Signature

Military service
- Allegiance: United States
- Branch/service: United States Army
- Years of service: 1812–1815
- Rank: Brigadier general
- Commands: Army of the Northwest
- Battles/wars: War of 1812: Battle of Malcolm's Mills aka. McArthur's Raid

Duncan McArthur (1772 – April 29, 1839) was a military officer and a Federalist and National Republican politician from Ohio. He served as the 11th governor of Ohio.

When first elected to state office as a representative, he was serving in the state militia during the War of 1812. He was later appointed as brigadier general in the U.S. Army. Shortly thereafter he was placed in charge of the Army of the Northwest, serving through 1817 and negotiating the Treaty of Fort Meigs of 1817 to ratify peace and land cessions with Native American tribes.

== Biography ==
Sources vary as to McArthur's exact birthdate. It has been given as January 14, 1772, or June 14, 1772. He was born to Scottish immigrants in Dutchess County in the Province of New York, McArthur grew up in western Pennsylvania and later moved to Kentucky, where he was employed as an Indian ranger.

McArthur and his friend Alexander McGuffey volunteered in 1790 at Fort Pitt for expeditions against Native Americans during the Northwest Indian War, serving as a scout under Generals Josiah Harmar and Anthony Wayne. McArthur obtained a position with Nathaniel Massie in 1793, and worked with Massie on a surveying expedition in the Northwest Territory. In 1796, he worked with Massie to lay out the new town of Chillicothe, Ohio, which was to become the state capital in 1803. McArthur moved across the Ohio River in 1797 to Chillicothe, where he gained wealth by his land speculations in the Northwest Territory.

McArthur was elected to the United States House of Representatives from Ohio's 3rd congressional district while serving in the state militia during the War of 1812. He never qualified for office as he preferred to continue serving in the military.

He was appointed colonel of Ohio volunteers and was second-in-command to General William Hull at Fort Detroit. He and Colonel Lewis Cass were not present at Detroit when Hull surrendered and were greatly angered to hear that Hull had included both of them in the capitulation. When a British officer notified him of the surrender, McArthur is said to have torn off his epaulettes and broke his sword in a fit of rage, although historians note similar stories were told about other officers as well. The British paroled him and McArthur returned to Ohio.

He was appointed a brigadier general in the U.S. Army. Shortly thereafter he was placed in charge of the Army of the Northwest following Harrison's resignation.

McArthur did not face much action after that, but he was engaged in negotiating treaties with the Indians. In 1817, he was one of two commissioners (along with Lewis Cass) who negotiated the Treaty of Fort Meigs, which was signed September 29 of that year with several Native American tribes.

== End of War of 1812 ==
McArthur did not face much action any further, but he was engaged in negotiating treaties with the Indians. In 1817, he was one of two commissioners (along with Lewis Cass) who negotiated the Treaty of Fort Meigs, which was signed September 29 of that year with several Native American tribes.

== Serving in the House of Representatives ==
McArthur served intermittently thereafter in the Ohio House of Representatives and Ohio State Senate. He was elected and served a single term from 1823 to 1825 in the United States House of Representatives before winning election to the governorship in 1830. McArthur served a single term and did not seek re-election.

== Death ==
McArthur was buried in Grandview Cemetery, Chillicothe, Ross County, Ohio, US. The trust established in his will later became the subject of litigation that went before the U.S. Supreme Court in McArthur v. Scott.

== Legacy ==
The small village of McArthur, Ohio, the seat of Vinton County, is named for him.

McArthur founded the city of Greenfield, Ohio in 1799. Greenfield is located at N39 21.11958 W83 22.96284 (GPS coordinates), about 21 miles due west of Chillicothe. State Route 28, which runs between Greenfield and Chillicothe, in 1973 was named as General Duncan McArthur Highway per act of the 113th Ohio General Assembly.

The execution of McArthur's will resulted in a United States Supreme Court case, McArthur v. Scott (1885). The will bequeathed a future interest to his unborn grandchildren, but that stipulation was set aside. Later, those grandchildren contested the will's execution. The Supreme Court held that the decree setting aside their interest was not binding on them because their virtual representative at the hearing was antagonistic to their interest.

Party political offices
Preceded by Allen Trimble	National Republican nominee for Governor of Ohio; 1830, 1832	Succeeded by Darius Lyman
Political offices
Preceded by Thomas Kirker	Speaker of the Ohio Senate; 1809–1810	Succeeded by Thomas Kirker
Preceded by Thomas Kirker	Speaker of the Ohio House of Representatives; 1817–1818	Succeeded by Joseph Richardson
Preceded by Allen Trimble	Governor of Ohio; 1830–1832	Succeeded by Robert Lucas
Ohio House of Representatives
Preceded by William Creighton, Sr. James Dunlap; John Evans; Elias Langham	Representative from Ross and Franklin Counties; 1804–1805; Served alongside: Michael Baldwin, James Dunlap, William Patton	Succeeded by James Dunlap; Elias Langham; David Shelby; Abraham J. Williams
Preceded by James Barnes; John McDougall; Samuel Swearingen	Representative from Ross County; 1815–1816; Served alongside: James Barnes, Thomas Scott	Succeeded by James Barnes; James Manary; William Vance
Preceded by James Barnes; James Manary; William Vance	Representative from Ross County; 1817–1818; Served alongside: James Manary, William Vance	Succeeded by Joseph Kerr; John Sill; James S. Swearingen
Ohio Senate
Preceded by Abraham Claypool; Joseph Kerr	Senator from Ross and Franklin Counties; 1805–1806; Served alongside: Joseph Kerr	Succeeded by Himself; Abraham Claypool as Senators from Ross, Franklin, and Highland Counties
Preceded by Himself; Joseph Kerr as Senators from Ross and Franklin Counties	Senator from Ross, Franklin, and Highland Counties; 1806–1808; Served alongside: Abraham Claypool	District eliminated
New district	Senator from Ross County; 1808–1813; Served alongside: Henry Massie (1808–1810), Robert Dunlap (1810–1811), James Dunlap (1811–1813)	Succeeded by William Creighton, Sr. James Dunlap
Preceded by Samuel Swearingen	Senator from Ross County; 1821–1823	Succeeded by David Crouse
U.S. House of Representatives
Preceded by New district	Member of the U.S. House of Representatives from Ohio's 3rd congressional district March 4, 1813 – April 5, 1813	Succeeded by William Creighton Jr.
Preceded by John Sloane	Member of the U.S. House of Representatives from Ohio's 6th congressional district March 4, 1823 – March 3, 1825	Succeeded by John Thomson
