= Bailey v. United States =

- Supreme Court of the United States

Argued October 30, 1995 Decided December 6, 1995
- Full case name: Ronald J. Bailey v. United States of America; Candisha Summerita Robinson v. United States of America
- Citations: 516 U.S. 137 (more) 116 S. Ct. 501; 133 L. Ed. 2d 472

Case history
- Prior: United States v. Bailey, 36 F.3d 106, 308 U.S. App. D.C. 292 (D.C. Cir. 1994)

Holding
- "Use" of a firearm during or in relation to a drug crime or a crime of violence requires active employment of the firearm and not mere possession.

Court membership
- Chief Justice William Rehnquist Associate Justices John P. Stevens · Sandra Day O'Connor; Antonin Scalia · Anthony Kennedy; David Souter · Clarence Thomas; Ruth Bader Ginsburg · Stephen Breyer

Case opinion
- Majority: O'Connor, joined by unanimous
- Superseded by
- Act of Nov. 3, 1998, Pub. L. No. 105-386, 112 Stat. 3469 (codified at 18 U.S.C. § 924(c))

Bailey v. United States, 516 U.S. 137 (1995), was a United States Supreme Court case in which the Court interpreted a frequently used section of the federal criminal code. At the time of the decision, 18 U.S.C. § 924(c) imposed a mandatory, consecutive five-year prison term on anyone who "during and in relation to any... drug trafficking crime... uses a firearm." The lower court had sustained the defendants' convictions, defining "use" in such a way as to mean little more than mere possession. The Supreme Court ruled instead that "use" means "active employment" of a firearm, and sent the cases back to the lower court for further proceedings. As a result of the Court's decision in Bailey, Congress amended the statute to expressly include possession of a firearm as requiring the additional five-year prison term.

== Background ==
In May 1989, Bailey was stopped in the District of Columbia for not having a front license plate on his car. Bailey could not produce a driver's license, and the officers ordered him out of the car. As Bailey was exiting the car, the officers saw him stuff something between the seat and the front console. A subsequent search of the passenger compartment revealed 27 plastic bags containing a total of 30 grams of cocaine. In the trunk of the car the officers found a loaded nine-millimeter pistol.

In June 1991, Robinson was the target of two controlled purchases of cocaine. The police then obtained a search warrant and searched Robinson's one-bedroom apartment, where they found an unloaded .22 caliber pistol and 11 grams of crack cocaine. They also found a marked $20 bill from one of the prior controlled purchases.

Both Bailey and Robinson were charged with numerous crimes, including violations of 18 U.S.C. § 924(c)(1), which forbade using or carrying a firearm during and in relation to a drug crime. At Bailey's trial, a government witness testified that drug dealers frequently carry a firearm to protect both the drugs and themselves. There was similar testimony at Robinson's trial. Bailey and Robinson were both convicted of all the charges against them, including the § 924(c) charge. They each appealed their convictions to the District of Columbia Circuit.

A three-judge panel of the court affirmed Bailey's § 924(c) conviction, but another three-judge panel reversed Robinson's. To correct this disparity, the court consolidated both cases and reheard them en banc. It held that "one uses a gun, i.e., avails oneself of a gun, and therefore violates [§ 924(c)(1)], whenever one puts or keeps the gun in a particular place from which one (or one's agent) can gain access to it if and when needed to facilitate a drug crime." Because in both Bailey's and Robinson's cases the gun was sufficiently accessible and proximate to the drugs that the jury could have concluded that the gun was there to protect the drugs. The Supreme Court agreed to review the case to resolve a split of authority among the federal courts of appeals about the meaning of the word "use" in § 924(c).

== Opinion of the Court ==
The Supreme Court rejected the interpretation of the D.C. Circuit, and held that "use" of a firearm requires "active employment" of the firearm, "a use that makes the firearm an operative factor in relation to the predicate offense." Context is important because the word "use" has so many meanings—"I use a gun to protect my house, but I've never had to use it." The statute did not impose liability for mere possession, though Congress could easily have done so if it had wanted to.

Accordingly, the D.C. Circuit's mistake stemmed from its defining "use" by "accessibility and proximity," a standard that in practice swept up more than active employment but most instances of mere possession. "In practice, nearly every possession of a firearm by a person engaged in drug trafficking would satisfy the standard." Because Congress did not draft the statute to criminalize mere possession, the D.C. Circuit's gloss ran contrary to Congress's intent. But the language of the statute by itself did not answer the real question at the heart of the case—if use was not the same as mere possession, what else beyond mere possession would the government have to prove to make out a violation of § 924(c)? Webster's Dictionary and Black's Law Dictionary defined "use" as "[t]o convert to one's service," "to employ," "to avail oneself of," and "to carry out a purpose or action by means of." These definitions implied action and implementation. Furthermore, the statute also made it illegal for someone to carry a firearm in relation to a drug crime, and the Court assumed that "carrying" was meant to supply an alternative basis for a § 924(c) charge. By limiting "use" to "active employment," the Court left room for someone to use a firearm without carrying it, as by brandishing the gun or bartering it, and to carry a firearm without using it, as by hiding it in clothing during the transaction.

In Bailey, the Supreme Court was required to clarify the meaning of the disputed statutory term “use” under § 924(c)(1), which imposed a five-year mandatory minimum sentence on a person who “uses or carries a firearm” during a crime of violence or drug trafficking crime. Ultimately, the Court assumed that Congress intended both “use” and “carry” to “have a particular, nonsuperfluous meaning,” and thereby gave “use” a more limited overtone. The unanimous decision narrowed the Court’s previous decision in Smith v. United States in which the majority contended that Congress intended to give the word “use” a “broad meaning,” and accordingly rejected the defense’s argument that the statute was limited to the use of a firearm “as a weapon.”

Defining "use" as "active employment" required the Court to remand the cases for further proceedings. Bailey's gun was in the trunk of his car; there was no evidence that he was actively employing the gun at the time of his arrest. Similarly, Robinson's gun was in a locked footlocker in her bedroom closet. But the court of appeals had not considered whether the "carry" prong supported the convictions, so the Court remanded the case for further proceedings.

== Subsequent developments ==
After Bailey was issued, however, Congress responded by broadening the statute, essentially overruling the Court's decision by statutory amendment. The statute now criminalizes using or carrying a firearm in connection with a drug trafficking offense or crime of violence, as well as the mere possession of a firearm in furtherance of such an offense. This did not affect the Bailey defendants themselves, or any defendant whose "crime" had occurred before Congress amended 18 U.S.C. § 924(c) since the Constitution forbids enactment of ex post facto law. A cascade of sentence reductions and collateral appeals followed the decision, since it effectively held that the conduct to which thousands of defendants had pleaded guilty did not constitute a crime at the time that conduct was undertaken.
