= Sprint/United Management Co. v. Mendelsohn =

- Supreme Court of the United States

Decided February 26, 2008
- Full case name: Sprint/United Management Co. v. Mendelsohn
- Citations: 552 U.S. 379 (more)

Holding
- Whether "me too" evidence of discrimination offered by co-workers in support of a claim against the employer is relevant in an individual ADEA case is fact based and depends on many factors; it is not appropriate for reviewing courts to apply per se rules about their admissibility or inadmissibility.

Court membership
- Chief Justice John Roberts Associate Justices John P. Stevens · Antonin Scalia; Anthony Kennedy · David Souter; Clarence Thomas · Ruth Bader Ginsburg; Stephen Breyer · Samuel Alito

Case opinion
- Majority: Thomas, joined by unanimous

Laws applied
- Age Discrimination in Employment Act of 1967

Sprint/United Management Co. v. Mendelsohn, 552 U.S. 379 (2008), was a United States Supreme Court case in which the court held that whether "me too" evidence of discrimination offered by co-workers in support of a claim against the employer is relevant in an individual Age Discrimination in Employment Act of 1967 (ADEA) case is fact based and depends on many factors; it is not appropriate for reviewing courts to apply per se rules about their admissibility or inadmissibility.

== Background ==
In Ellen Mendelsohn's age discrimination case, Sprint moved in limine to exclude the testimony of former employees alleging discrimination by supervisors who had no role in the employment decision Mendelsohn challenged, on the ground that such evidence was irrelevant to the case's central issue and unduly prejudicial. Granting the motion, the federal district court excluded evidence of discrimination against those not "similarly situated" to Mendelsohn. The Tenth Circuit Court of Appeals treated that order as applying a per se rule that evidence from employees of other supervisors is irrelevant in age discrimination cases, concluded that the district court abused its discretion by relying on the Circuit's Aramburu v. Boeing Co. case, determined that the evidence was relevant and not unduly prejudicial, and remanded for a new trial.

== Opinion of the court ==
The court issued an opinion on February 26, 2008.
