= Taylor v. Sturgell =

- Supreme Court of the United States

Argued April 16, 2008 Decided June 12, 2008
- Full case name: Brent Taylor, Petitioner v. Robert A. Sturgell, Acting Administrator, Federal Aviation Administration, et al.
- Docket no.: 07-371
- Citations: 553 U.S. 880 (more) 128 S. Ct. 2161; 171 L. Ed. 2d 155

Holding
- A "virtually represented" non-party cannot be bound by a judgment.

Court membership
- Chief Justice John Roberts Associate Justices John P. Stevens · Antonin Scalia; Anthony Kennedy · David Souter; Clarence Thomas · Ruth Bader Ginsburg; Stephen Breyer · Samuel Alito

Case opinion
- Majority: Ginsburg, joined by unanimous

Taylor v. Sturgell, 553 U.S. 880 (2008), was a United States Supreme Court case involving res judicata. It held that a "virtually represented" non-party cannot be bound by a judgment.

== Background ==
Greg Herrick, owner of an antique aircraft made by Fairchild Engineering and Airplane Corporation in the 1930s, sought more information on how to restore his plane. He filed an FOIA request for technical documents with the Federal Aviation Administration (FAA), of which the FAA had hundreds of pages. The FAA refused Herrick's request, asserting that the documents were trade secrets. Herrick sued over the denial, but both the district court granted summary judgment to the FAA, and the appellate court affirmed on July 24, 2002. During the appeals process, Herrick obtained documents from the FAA that supported his case, but he could not introduce it as it had not been pled in district court.

On August 22, 2002, less than a month after the appellate court's decision, Brent Taylor, a friend of Herrick and another antique aircraft enthusiast filed an FOIA request for the same documents through the same lawyer. Taylor had not participated in Herrick's case, and they had no agreement for Taylor to participate in the restoration of Herrick's plane. Taylor's FOIA request was denied, but in his appeal, Taylor sought to introduce the documents Herrick had received during his case's discovery. The district and appellate courts held that Taylor was precluded from litigating the issue because he had been "virtually represented" in the prior case. Because Taylor and Herrick were seeking the same documents and were in fact trying to restore the same airplane, reasoned the lower courts, they were attempting to relitigate the issue.

== Opinion of the Court ==
Associate Justice Ruth Bader Ginsburg wrote the opinion for a unanimous court, overturning the decision below by the D.C. Circuit. The holding means that the only form of virtual representation in federal courts is the class action. On remand, Taylor obtained the documents.

== See also ==
- McArthur v. Scott, an earlier case disapproving of virtual representation.
- Res judicata
