= Richlin Security Service Co. v. Chertoff =

- Supreme Court of the United States

Argued March 19, 2008 Decided June 2, 2008
- Full case name: Richlin Security Service Company, petitioner v Michael Chertoff, Secretary of Homeland Security
- Docket no.: 06-717
- Citations: 553 U.S. 571 (more) 128 S. Ct. 2007; 170 L. Ed. 2d 960; 2008 U.S. LEXIS 4522; 76 U.S.L.W. 4360; 21 Fla. L. Weekly Fed. S 279
- Argument: Oral argument

Holding
- A prevailing party that satisfies EAJA's other requirements may recover its paralegal fees from the Government at prevailing market rates.

Court membership
- Chief Justice John Roberts Associate Justices John P. Stevens · Antonin Scalia; Anthony Kennedy · David Souter; Clarence Thomas · Ruth Bader Ginsburg; Stephen Breyer · Samuel Alito

Case opinion
- Majority: Alito, joined by Roberts, Stevens, Kennedy, Souter, Ginsburg, Breyer; Scalia (except Part III–A); Thomas (except Parts II–B and III)

Laws applied
- Equal Access to Justice Act (EAJA) (5 U.S.C. § 504; 28 U.S.C. § 2412

Richlin Security Service Co. v. Chertoff, 553 U.S. 571 (2008), was a case in which the Supreme Court of the United States evaluated standards for awarding attorney's fees under the Equal Access to Justice Act. After it prevailed in a lawsuit for back wages, Richlin filed an application for reimbursement of fees and expenses from the lawsuit, including 523.8 hours of paralegal work. Richlin requested the paralegal fees at the market rate for the services, rather than at the cost to the law firm that represented Richlin. The Department of Transportation's Board of Contract Appeals ruled that recovery of fees should be limited to the cost to the attorneys, and the United States Court of Appeals for the Federal Circuit affirmed the Board's determination. In an opinion written by Justice Samuel Alito, the Court held that parties are entitled to reimbursement for services at prevailing market rates.
