= Federal Express Corp. v. Holowecki =

- Supreme Court of the United States

Argued November 6, 2007 Decided February 27, 2008
- Full case name: Federal Express Corporation, Petitioner v. Paul Holowecki et al.
- Docket no.: 06-1322
- Citations: 552 U.S. 389 (more) 128 S. Ct. 1147; 2008 WL 508018
- Argument: Oral argument
- Opinion announcement: Opinion announcement

Case history
- Prior: Holowecki v. Federal Exp. Corp., 440 F.3d 558 (2d Cir. 2006)

Questions presented
- Do the questionnaire and affidavit submitted to the EEOC qualify as a charge of discrimination under the ADEA?

Holding
- The documents filed did qualify as a charge, as they could be reasonably construed as a request for the agency to take action.

Court membership
- Chief Justice John Roberts Associate Justices John P. Stevens · Antonin Scalia; Anthony Kennedy · David Souter; Clarence Thomas · Ruth Bader Ginsburg; Stephen Breyer · Samuel Alito

Case opinions
- Majority: Kennedy, joined by Roberts, Stevens, Souter, Ginsburg, Breyer, and Alito
- Dissent: Thomas, joined by Scalia

Laws applied
- Age Discrimination in Employment Act of 1967

Federal Express Corp. v. Holowecki, 552 U.S. 389 (2008), was a case decided by the Supreme Court of the United States on February 27, 2008. The ruling provided guidance on what would constitute an adequate filing under the Age Discrimination in Employment Act of 1967 (ADEA).

== Background ==
FedEx implemented new employee policies in 1994–95 requiring supervisors and couriers to set delivery goals per route. The plaintiffs alleged FedEx began using these goals as benchmarks and disproportionately disciplined older couriers who failed to meet them, effectively discriminating by age and unfairly terminating older workers. Under the ADEA, a person may file a civil action 60 days after filing a “charge” with the Equal Employment Opportunity Commission (EEOC). This process would satisfy the exhaustion of administrative remedies, which aims to provide the employer with notice of the claim and ensure that the EEOC has a chance to resolve the claim before a civil action is filed. One of the plaintiffs in this case, Kennedy, filed with the EEOC a Form 283 “Intake Questionnaire” and a signed affidavit more than 60 days before filing suit. The EEOC, however, did not take the usual steps after a filing to process it as a charge. FedEx argued that Kennedy failed to file a charge with the EEOC as required by the ADEA.

== Procedural history ==
The U.S. District Court for the Southern District of New York dismissed the suit, holding that the documents did not constitute a charge, and that Kennedy did not receive a notice of right to sue from the EEOC. The United States Court of Appeals for the Second Circuit reversed, holding that the questionnaire satisfied the charge requirement even though the EEOC did not take action. The Court of Appeals interpreted the term "charge" to include documents filed by Kennedy, since a definition was not provided by the ADEA. The Court also noted that this interpretation would fulfill the ADEA's requirement of providing the EEOC with notice.

== Decision ==
In a 7–2 decision delivered by Justice Kennedy, the Court affirmed the decision of the Court of Appeals and held that the plaintiff met the procedural requirements. The Court accepted the EEOC’s test for determining whether a filing constituted a charge as set forth in its amicus curiae brief as well as internal directives, and decided: “In addition to the information required by the regulations, i.e., an allegation and the name of the charged party, if a filing is to be deemed a charge it must be reasonably construed as a request for the agency to take remedial action to protect the employee’s rights or otherwise settle a dispute between the employer and the employee.” The Court then decided that the documents filed in this case met these requirements.

The Court noted that without the accompanying affidavit, the questionnaire filed by Kennedy alone would likely not constitute a charge. The Court also stated that although this standard would allow a wide range of documents to qualify as charges, this result was consistent with the ADEA's setup where laypersons instead of lawyers are expected to initiate the administrative process.

Furthermore, the Court noted that although the employer in this case was not notified of the complaint until a formal lawsuit was filed, "[t]he court that hears the merits of this litigation can attempt to remedy this deficiency by staying the proceedings to allow an opportunity for conciliation and settlement." The Court considered this result "unfortunate" but "unavoidable," and stated that the EEOC bears the responsibility to establish a more clear and consistent process in order to avoid future similar misunderstandings and consequences.

Justices Thomas and Scalia dissented. Thomas stated that the majority's ruling would absolve the EEOC of its obligation to administer the law properly. Thomas led the EEOC as its eighth Chairman in the 1980s.

== Response ==
In response to the decision, the EEOC stated, "as the Court noted, the EEOC has taken steps to ensure timely notification to respondents of receipt of intake questionnaires or other correspondence that constitute charges. We will continue to review our procedures as the Court has suggested to ensure that they are clear to the public and consistent with our statutes and regulations."

== Impact ==
Because the opinion specified that the decision would only apply to the ADEA, the ruling would not be a precedent for cases brought under other legislation such as Title I of the ADA or Title VII of the Civil Rights Act.

== Subsequent cases ==
Several later cases followed the decision in Holowecki. In Morrow v. Metro Transit in 2009, the plaintiff filed a questionnaire similar to the one in Holowecki. However, instead of including an affidavit, the plaintiff attached a paragraph with relevant facts. The court held in accordance with Holowecki that the questionnaire alone was not enough and including the paragraph, as opposed to an affidavit, was also not sufficient.

In Aly v. Mohegan Council, Boy Scouts of America in 2013, the court followed Holowecki's opinion of a charge being a document that could be reasonably construed as a request for the agency to take action, and decided that the questionnaire at issue satisfied this definition, since it included language that could be construed as requesting action. Specifically, the questionnaire referred to the employee as a complainant, and referred to the form itself as an “employment complaint being filed against the Respondent”.

== See also ==
- Age Discrimination in Employment Act of 1967
- Ageism
- Equal Employment Opportunity Commission
- List of United States Supreme Court cases, volume 552
- United States labor law
