= United States v. Clintwood Elkhorn Mining Co. =

United States v. Clintwood Elkhorn Mining Company
- Supreme Court of the United States

Argued March 24, 2008 Decided April 15, 2008
- Full case name: United States, Petitioner v. Clintwood Elkhorn Mining Company, et al.
- Citations: 553 U.S. 1 (more) 128 S. Ct. 1511; 170 L. Ed. 2d 392; 2008 U.S. LEXIS 3472; 76 U.S.L.W. 4189; 2008-1 U.S. Tax Cas. (CCH) ¶ 70,275; 2008-1 U.S. Tax Cas. (CCH) ¶ 50,281; 101 A.F.T.R.2d (RIA) 1612; 21 Fla. L. Weekly Fed. S 161

Holding
- A person claiming a refund for an unconstitutional tax must go through the normal administrative procedures for tax refunds before filing a lawsuit against the government.

Court membership
- Chief Justice John Roberts Associate Justices John P. Stevens · Antonin Scalia; Anthony Kennedy · David Souter; Clarence Thomas · Ruth Bader Ginsburg; Stephen Breyer · Samuel Alito

Case opinion
- Majority: Roberts, joined by unanimous

United States v. Clintwood Elkhorn Mining Company, 553 U.S. 1 (2008), is a United States Supreme Court case that concerns refunds for a tax that was levied and subsequently found to be unconstitutional. The Court held that a person claiming a refund for an unconstitutional tax must go through the normal administrative procedures for tax refunds before filing a lawsuit against the government.
