= CSX Transportation, Inc. v. Georgia State Board of Equalization =

CSX Transportation, Inc. v. Ga. State Board of Equalization
- Supreme Court of the United States

Decided December 4, 2007
- Full case name: CSX Transportation, Inc. v. Ga. State Board of Equalization
- Citations: 552 U.S. 9 (more)

Holding
- The 4–R Act allows a railroad to attempt to show that state methods for determining the value of railroad property result in a discriminatory determination of true market value.

Court membership
- Chief Justice John Roberts Associate Justices John P. Stevens · Antonin Scalia; Anthony Kennedy · David Souter; Clarence Thomas · Ruth Bader Ginsburg; Stephen Breyer · Samuel Alito

Case opinion
- Majority: Roberts, joined by unanimous

Laws applied
- Railroad Revitalization and Regulatory Reform Act of 1976

CSX Transportation, Inc. v. Ga. State Board of Equalization, 552 U.S. 9 (2007), was a United States Supreme Court case in which the Court held that the Railroad Revitalization and Regulatory Reform Act of 1976 (4-R Act) allows a railroad to attempt to show that state methods for determining the value of railroad property result in a discriminatory determination of true market value.
