= Boulware v. United States =

- Supreme Court of the United States

Decided March 3, 2008
- Full case name: Boulware v. United States
- Citations: 552 U.S. 421 (more)

Holding
- A distributee accused of criminal tax evasion may claim return-of-capital treatment without producing evidence that, when the distribution occurred, either they or the corporation intended to return the capital.

Court membership
- Chief Justice John Roberts Associate Justices John P. Stevens · Antonin Scalia; Anthony Kennedy · David Souter; Clarence Thomas · Ruth Bader Ginsburg; Stephen Breyer · Samuel Alito

Case opinion
- Majority: Souter, joined by unanimous

Boulware v. United States, 552 U.S. 421 (2008), was a United States Supreme Court case in which the Court held that a distributee accused of criminal tax evasion may claim return-of-capital treatment without producing evidence that, when the distribution occurred, either they or the corporation intended to return the capital.
