= Montgomery v. Louisiana =

- Supreme Court of the United States

Argued October 13, 2015 Decided January 25, 2016
- Full case name: Henry Montgomery, Petitioner v. Louisiana
- Docket no.: 14-280
- Citations: 577 U.S. 190 (more) 136 S. Ct. 718; 193 L. Ed. 2d 599
- Argument: Oral argument

Case history
- Prior: annulling verdict, 181 So. 2d 756 (1966), affirming life sentence, 242 So.2d 818 (1970), denying motion to correct illegal sentence, 141 So.3d 264 (2014).
- Subsequent: vacating sentence and remanding, 194 So.3d 606 (2016).

Holding
- Miller's prohibition on life in prison without the possibility of parole for juvenile homicide offenders is a substantive rule that must be applied retroactively.

Court membership
- Chief Justice John Roberts Associate Justices Antonin Scalia · Anthony Kennedy; Clarence Thomas · Ruth Bader Ginsburg; Stephen Breyer · Samuel Alito; Sonia Sotomayor · Elena Kagan

Case opinions
- Majority: Kennedy, joined by Roberts, Ginsburg, Breyer, Sotomayor, Kagan
- Dissent: Scalia, joined by Thomas, Alito
- Dissent: Thomas

Laws applied
- U.S. Const. amend. VIII

Montgomery v. Louisiana, 577 U.S. 190 (2016), was a United States Supreme Court case in which the Court held that its previous ruling in Miller v. Alabama (2012), that a mandatory life sentence without parole should not apply to persons convicted of murder committed as juveniles, should be applied retroactively. This decision potentially affects up to 2,300 cases nationwide.

This case is one in a series since 2005 that have mitigated the harshness of sentencing of juveniles and persons who committed crimes as juveniles. It is based in part on scientific evidence showing that juvenile brains are not equivalent to those of adults.

== Background ==
=== Issue ===
In Roper v. Simmons (2005), the Supreme Court of the United States by a 5–4 vote established that the death penalty for children under 18 was unconstitutional. In Graham v. Florida (2010), the Court ruled that it was unconstitutional to impose mandatory life sentence without parole on prisoners who committed non-murder crimes as juveniles.

Two years later, in Miller v. Alabama (2012), the Court by a 5–4 vote decided that mandatory life sentence without parole should not apply to persons who committed the crime as juveniles.

=== Petitioner ===
Henry Montgomery was 17 years old on November 13, 1963, when he shot and killed police officer Charles Hurt, a sheriff's deputy, in East Baton Rouge Parish, Louisiana. A jury convicted Montgomery of murder and sentenced him to death in February 1964 but, in January 1966, the divided Louisiana Supreme Court annulled that verdict, finding he had not received a fair trial due to public prejudice. In October 1966, Montgomery escaped from the parish jail and was rearrested two hours later.

In February 1969, a jury again convicted Montgomery of murder, triggering an automatic sentence of life in prison without parole, which was affirmed by the Louisiana Supreme Court in November 1970, over the dissent of Justice Mack Barham.

Montgomery became a model member of the prison community, serving as a coach on the prison boxing team, working in the prison's silk-screen program, and offering advice to younger prisoners. After the U.S. Supreme Court decided Miller v. Alabama, Montgomery made a motion to correct an illegal sentence, which, in June 2014, was denied by the Louisiana Supreme Court, over the dissent of Chief Justice Bernette Joshua Johnson.

== Supreme Court of the United States ==
In September 2014, Montgomery filed a petition for a writ of certiorari from the U.S. Supreme Court, which was granted. Seventy-five minutes of oral arguments were heard on October 13, 2015, with attorneys appearing for the prisoner and the state as well as an amicus curiae appointed by the Court, arguing against the Court's jurisdiction, and the U.S. Deputy Solicitor General, arguing as a friend of the prisoner.

=== Opinion of the Court ===
On January 25, 2016, the Supreme Court delivered judgment in favor of the prisoner, by a vote of 6–3. Writing for the Court, Justice Anthony Kennedy, joined by Chief Justice John Roberts, along with Justices Ruth Bader Ginsburg, Stephen Breyer, Sonia Sotomayor, and Elena Kagan, applied the Miller v. Alabama rule retroactively, holding that prisoners previously given automatic life sentences with no chance of parole for crimes committed as juveniles must have their cases reviewed for re-sentencing or be considered for parole.

The Court first found that it had jurisdiction over Louisiana's prisoner because the rule governing retroactivity is constitutional, not statutory. Next, Justice Kennedy wrote that "prisoners like Montgomery must be given the opportunity to show their crime did not reflect irreparable corruption; and if it did not, their hope for some years of life outside prison walls must be restored." Applying the presumption from Teague v. Lane (1989) that a new rule is not retroactive on collateral review unless it is substantive or "watershed", Kennedy said the decision was founded on substantive grounds, based "on the diminished culpability of all juvenile offenders, who are, he said, immature, susceptible to peer pressure and capable of change. Very few, he said, are incorrigible. But he added that as a general matter the punishment was out of bounds."

=== Dissents ===
Justice Antonin Scalia, joined by Justices Clarence Thomas and Samuel Alito dissented. Criticizing the majority's "sleight of hand", Scalia wrote that Kennedy had twisted the language in the Miller decision to make it sound categorical when it merely required a new sentencing procedure. Scalia also stated that it would be very difficult for judges and juries to decide whether defendants were incorrigible decades after they were originally sentenced.

Justice Thomas filed another dissenting opinion, alone, stating that the majority's decision "repudiates established principles of finality".

== Subsequent developments ==
On June 28, 2016, the Louisiana Supreme Court vacated Montgomery's life sentence and remanded for resentencing in a per curiam decision, with Justice Scott Crichton additionally concurring. In February 2017, Montgomery, now 70 years old, remained a prisoner at the Louisiana State Penitentiary in Angola. In February 2018 and April 2019, Montgomery had parole hearings, and was denied both times. On November 17, 2021, the Louisiana Board of Pardons and Parole granted parole to Montgomery by a unanimous vote of 3–0. Following the vote, Montgomery was freed from prison and released. His release was opposed by some of Hurt's family members, however, two of Hurt's daughters had met with Montgomery in prison and forgiven him.

In March 2020, the Supreme Court agreed to hear a related case, Jones v. Mississippi, involving a person who had killed his grandfather when he was 15 in 2004 and given the mandatory sentence of life without parole. Due to the reactive rulings in Miller and Montgomery, Jones was given a rehearing but was still resentenced to life in prison, and appealed, claiming the court did not evaluate any aspect of his incorrigibility as required under Montgomery. Oral hearings were held on November 3, 2020.

== See also ==
- List of United States Supreme Court decisions on capital punishment
