= Burgess v. United States =

Keith Lavon Burges v United States
- Supreme Court of the United States

Argued March 24, 2008 Decided April 16, 2008
- Full case name: Burgess v United States
- Citations: 553 U.S. 124 (more) 128 S.Ct. 1572; 170 L. Ed. 2d 478; 2008 U.S. LEXIS 3475

Case history
- Prior: Appeals court affirmed conviction, 478 F.3d 658 (4th Cir. 2007).

Holding
- The definition of "serious drug felony" for the purposes of sentencing under the Controlled Substances Act does not include "misdemeanor" and "felony" in any non-federal jurisdiction.

Court membership
- Chief Justice John Roberts Associate Justices John P. Stevens · Antonin Scalia; Anthony Kennedy · David Souter; Clarence Thomas · Ruth Bader Ginsburg; Stephen Breyer · Samuel Alito

Case opinion
- Majority: Ginsburg, joined by unanimous

Laws applied
- 21 U.S.C. 841

Burgess v. United States, 553 U.S. 124 (2008), was a United States Supreme Court case in which the court held that the definition of "serious drug felony" for the purposes of sentencing an individual as having a prior drug conviction is taken from 21 U.S. Code § 802(44) and not § 802(13). The former definition ties the meaning of "felony drug offense" to a drug offense punishable by more than a year in prison regardless of the jurisdiction, while the latter has a broader jurisdiction.

== Background ==
Keith Lavon Burgess was convicted in a South Carolina state court for cocaine possession. Although the maximum sentence under state law was two years, South Carolina classified the offense as a misdemeanor, rather than a felony. At a later proceeding, Burgess pleaded guilty for conspiracy to possess with intent to distribute 50 grams or more of cocaine in Federal Court. At his sentencing, the judge applied to Burgess the "prior conviction" statute, which required a minimum twenty-year sentence for anyone with a prior "felony drug conviction." In Burgess' appeal to the Court he maintained that since South Carolina considered his first offense a misdemeanor, the "prior felony drug conviction" did not apply.

== Opinion of the Court ==
In a unanimous opinion written by Justice Ruth Bader Ginsburg, the Supreme Court rejected Burgess' appeal, holding that "felony" refers to any offense that is punishable for more than a year even if another jurisdiction classifies the offense as a misdemeanor.

== See also ==
- Lopez v. Gonzales: state felony conviction that would be a federal misdemeanor
