= Smith v. United States (1993) =

- Supreme Court of the United States

Argued March 23, 1993 Decided June 1, 1993
- Full case name: John Angus Smith, Petitioner v. United States
- Citations: 508 U.S. 223 (more) 113 S. Ct. 2050; 124 L. Ed. 2d 138; 1993 U.S. LEXIS 3740; 61 U.S.L.W. 4503; 93 Cal. Daily Op. Service 3929; 93 Daily Journal DAR 6966; 7 Fla. L. Weekly Fed. S 326

Case history
- Prior: On writ of certiorari to the United States Court of Appeals for the Eleventh Circuit

Holding
- The exchange of a gun for drugs constitutes "use" of the firearm for purposes of a federal statute imposing penalties for "use" of a firearm "during and in relation to" a drug trafficking crime.

Court membership
- Chief Justice William Rehnquist Associate Justices Byron White · Harry Blackmun; John P. Stevens · Sandra Day O'Connor; Antonin Scalia · Anthony Kennedy; David Souter · Clarence Thomas

Case opinions
- Majority: O'Connor, joined by Rehnquist, White, Blackmun, Kennedy, Thomas
- Concurrence: Blackmun
- Dissent: Scalia, joined by Stevens, Souter

Smith v. United States, 508 U.S. 223 (1993), is a United States Supreme Court case that held that the exchange of a gun for drugs constituted "use" of the firearm for purposes of a federal statute imposing penalties for "use" of a firearm "during and in relation to" a drug trafficking crime.

In Watson v. United States, 128 S.Ct. 697 (2007) the court later decided that a transaction in the opposite direction does not violate the same statute (i.e., Smith holds that one "uses" a gun by giving it in exchange for drugs, but Watson holds that one does not "use" a gun by receiving it in exchange for drugs).

== Statutory context ==
The defendant exchanged a firearm for cocaine and was convicted of drug trafficking. The prosecution claimed this triggered enhanced sentencing because of the "use" of the gun in the commission of a crime. The defendant stated using a firearm for barter was not covered by the statutory meaning of "use". The Supreme Court had found that in a subsection of the statute, firearms could be "used" as objects of commerce rather than as weapons, implying that a similar understanding and interpretation of "used" should apply to the disputed sentence.

== See also ==
- List of United States Supreme Court cases, volume 508
- List of United States Supreme Court cases
- Lists of United States Supreme Court cases by volume
- List of United States Supreme Court cases by the Rehnquist Court
