= Stoneridge Investment Partners v. Scientific-Atlanta, Inc. =

Stoneridge Investment Partners v. Scientific-Atlanta
- Supreme Court of the United States

Argued October 9, 2007 Decided January 15, 2008
- Full case name: Stoneridge Investment Partners, L.L.C., Petitioner v. Scientific-Atlanta, Inc., et al.
- Docket no.: 06-43
- Citations: 552 U.S. 148 (more) 128 S. Ct. 761; 169 L. Ed. 2d 627; 2008 U.S. LEXIS 1091; 76 U.S.L.W. 4039; Fed. Sec. L. Rep. (CCH) ¶ 94,556; 21 Fla. L. Weekly Fed. S 46

Case history
- Prior: Certiorari to the United States Court of Appeals for the Eighth Circuit

Holding
- The private right of action under §10(b) of the Securities Exchange Act of 1934 does not extend to aiders and abettors. Because the conduct of a secondary actor must therefore satisfy each of the elements for §10(b) liability, the plaintiff must prove reliance upon a material misrepresentation or omission by the defendant.

Court membership
- Chief Justice John Roberts Associate Justices John P. Stevens · Antonin Scalia; Anthony Kennedy · David Souter; Clarence Thomas · Ruth Bader Ginsburg; Stephen Breyer · Samuel Alito

Case opinions
- Majority: Kennedy, joined by Roberts, Scalia, Thomas, Alito
- Dissent: Stevens, joined by Souter, Ginsburg
- Breyer took no part in the consideration or decision of the case.

Laws applied
- Section 10(b) of the Securities Exchange Act.

Stoneridge Investment Partners v. Scientific-Atlanta, 552 U.S. 148 (2008), was a decision by the United States Supreme Court pertaining to the scope of liability of secondary actors, such as lawyers and accountants, for securities fraud under the Securities Exchange Act of 1934. In a 5-3 decision authored by Justice Anthony M. Kennedy, the Court held that "aiders and abettors" of fraud cannot be held secondarily liable under the private right of action authorized by §10(b) of the Exchange Act. Such defendants can only be held liable if their own conduct satisfies each of the elements for §10(b) liability. Therefore, the plaintiff must prove reliance, in making a decision to acquire or hold a security, upon a material misrepresentation or omission by the defendant.

Stoneridge was recognized by The New York Times as the "most important securities fraud case in years," and also commented by Wall Street Journal, Forbes, and Business Week.

== See also ==
- Central Bank of Denver, N.A. v. First Interstate Bank of Denver, N.A. (1994)
