= Knight v. Commissioner =

- Supreme Court of the United States

Argued November 27, 2007 Decided January 16, 2008
- Full case name: Michael J. Knight, Trustee of the William L. Rudkin Testamentary Trust, Petitioner v. Commissioner of Internal Revenue
- Citations: 552 U.S. 181 (more) 128 S. Ct. 782; 169 L. Ed. 2d 652; 2008 U.S. LEXIS 1096; 76 U.S.L.W. 4048; 2008-1 U.S. Tax Cas. (CCH) ¶ 50,132; 101 A.F.T.R.2d (RIA) 544; 21 Fla. L. Weekly Fed. S 39

Holding
- Investment advisory fees generally are subject to the 2% tax-deductibility floor when incurred by a trust.

Court membership
- Chief Justice John Roberts Associate Justices John P. Stevens · Antonin Scalia; Anthony Kennedy · David Souter; Clarence Thomas · Ruth Bader Ginsburg; Stephen Breyer · Samuel Alito

Case opinion
- Majority: Roberts, joined by unanimous

Laws applied
- Internal Revenue Code

Knight v. Commissioner, 552 U.S. 181 (2008), was a United States Supreme Court case in which the court held that investment advisory fees generally are subject to the 2% tax-deductibility floor when incurred by a trust.

== Background ==
People may subtract from their federal taxable income certain itemized deductions, but only to the extent the deductions exceed 2% of adjusted gross income. A trust may also take such deductions subject to the 2% floor, except that when the relevant cost is "paid or incurred in connection with the administration of the... trust" and "would not have been incurred if the property were not held in such trust," the cost may be deducted without regard to the floor. After Michael J. Knight (Trustee), the trustee of a testamentary trust (Trust), hired the Warfield firm to advise as to Trust investments, the Trust deducted in full on its fiduciary income tax return the investment advisory fees paid to Warfield. The Commissioner of Internal Revenue found the fees subject to the 2% floor and therefore allowed the deduction only to the extent the fees exceeded 2% of the Trust's adjusted gross income. The Tax Court decided for the Commissioner, and the Second Circuit Court of Appeals affirmed, holding that because such fees were costs of a type that could be incurred if the property were held individually rather than in trust, their deduction by the Trust was subject to the 2% floor.

== Opinion of the court ==
The Supreme Court issued an opinion on January 16, 2008.
