= Logan v. United States =

- Supreme Court of the United States

Argued October 30, 2007 Decided December 4, 2007
- Full case name: Logan v. United States
- Docket no.: 06-6911
- Citations: 552 U.S. 23 (more) 128 S. Ct. 475; 169 L. Ed. 2d 432

Case history
- Prior: United States v. Logan, 453 F.3d 804 (7th Cir. 2006)

Holding
- The "civil rights restored" exemption of convictions for sentence-enhancement purposes did not extend to a defendant who retained his civil rights at all times, and whose post-conviction legal status remained in all respects unaltered by any state dispensation.

Court membership
- Chief Justice John Roberts Associate Justices John P. Stevens · Antonin Scalia; Anthony Kennedy · David Souter; Clarence Thomas · Ruth Bader Ginsburg; Stephen Breyer · Samuel Alito

Case opinion
- Majority: Ginsburg, joined by unanimous

Logan v. United States, 552 U.S. 23 (2007), was a case before the United States Supreme Court in which the court held that the "civil rights restored" exemption of convictions for sentence-enhancement purposes did not extend to a defendant who retained his civil rights at all times, and whose post-conviction legal status remained in all respects unaltered by any state dispensation.

== Background ==
Defendant pleaded that his sentence (for being a felon in possession of a firearm) was improperly enhanced under the Armed Career Criminal Act of 1984, 18 U.S.C.S. § 921(a)(20), because it was based on prior convictions which did not result in the loss of civil rights. Since that law did not include prior convictions for sentencing purposes if civil rights were restored, defendant argued that it also operated to preclude his prior state battery convictions from consideration at sentencing because the offenses occasioned no loss of civil rights.

The U.S. Court of Appeals for the Seventh Circuit affirmed his sentence.

== Question before the court ==
Is a conviction that does not result in a loss of civil rights excluded from the "three convictions rule" that are required to activate the Armed Career Criminal Act's sentence enhancement?

== Opinion of the court ==
The Court unanimously held that the "civil rights restored" exemption of convictions for sentence-enhancement purposes did not extend to a defendant who retained his civil rights at all times, and whose postconviction legal status remained in all respects unaltered by any state dispensation. Justice Ruth Ginsburg wrote the opinion of the Supreme Court. Restoration of rights means that the rights were previously taken away, and rights retained were not functionally equivalent to rights revoked but later restored. Further, the other statutory basis for disregarding convictions involved convictions which were expunged or set aside, or for which the offender was pardoned, all of which were postconviction events which relieved consequences of the convictions, and there was no showing of any congressional intent to broaden the "civil rights restored" exemption to cover convictions attended by no loss of civil rights.

== See also ==
- List of United States Supreme Court cases, volume 552
- Justia: Logan v. United States
