= Cara H. Drinan =

American law professor and author

Cara H. Drinan is an author, legal expert, and professor of law at The Catholic University of America's Columbus School of Law.

== Early life and education ==
Drinan received a bachelor's degree from Bowdoin College, a master's degree from Oxford University, and a Juris Doctor (J.D.) degree from Stanford Law School. In 1995, she received a Truman Scholarship and in 1997 she received a Marshall Scholarship.

== Law professor ==
Drinan frequently appears in the media as a legal expert. Her areas of expertise include justice and juvenile sentencing, criminal justice reform, capital punishment, access to counsel, mass incarceration, clemency, pardons, and parole.

In 2017, Drinan was part of a legal team that convinced Virginia Governor Terry McAuliffe to commute the death sentence of Ivan Teleguz, a man many believed to be wrongly convicted. In 2018, she began a program at the Columbus School of Law to document the lack of effective legal representation for economically disadvantaged criminal defendants in the United States.

== Selected works ==
- Drinan, Cara H. (2018). The War on Kids: How American Juvenile Justice Lost Its Way. Oxford University Press. ISBN 978-0-19-060555-1.
