= Bridge v. Phoenix Bond & Indemnity Co. =

- Supreme Court of the United States

Decided June 9, 2008
- Full case name: Bridge v. Phoenix Bond & Indemnity Co.
- Citations: 553 U.S. 639 (more)

Holding
- A RICO plaintiff asserting a claim predicated on mail fraud does not need to show that that plaintiff relied on the defendant's alleged misrepresentations.

Court membership
- Chief Justice John Roberts Associate Justices John P. Stevens · Antonin Scalia; Anthony Kennedy · David Souter; Clarence Thomas · Ruth Bader Ginsburg; Stephen Breyer · Samuel Alito

Case opinion
- Majority: Thomas, joined by unanimous

Laws applied
- Racketeer Influenced and Corrupt Organizations Act

Bridge v. Phoenix Bond & Indemnity Co., 553 U.S. 639 (2008), was a United States Supreme Court case in which the court held that a RICO plaintiff asserting a claim predicated on mail fraud does not need to show that that plaintiff relied on the defendant's alleged misrepresentations.

== Background ==
Each year, the Cook County, Illinois Treasurer's Office holds a public auction to sell its tax liens on delinquent taxpayers' property. To prevent any one buyer from obtaining a disproportionate share of the liens, the county adopted the "Single, Simultaneous Bidder Rule" (Rule), which requires each buyer to submit bids in its own name, prohibits a buyer from using "apparent agents, employees, or related entities" to submit simultaneous bids for the same parcel, and requires a registered bidder to submit a sworn affidavit affirming its compliance with the Rule. The plaintiffs (including Phoenix Bond & Indemnity) and the defendants (including Bridge) in this case regularly participate in the tax sales.

Bridge filed suit, alleging that Phoenix fraudulently obtained a disproportionate share of liens by filing false compliance attestations. Bridge claimed that Phoenix violated and conspired to violate the Racketeer Influenced and Corrupt Organizations Act (RICO) through a pattern of racketeering activity involving mail fraud, which occurred when petitioners sent property owners various notices required by Illinois law. The federal District Court dismissed the RICO claims for lack of standing, finding that respondents were not protected by the mail fraud statute because they did not receive the alleged misrepresentations. Reversing, the Seventh Circuit Court of Appeals based standing on the injury respondents suffered when they lost the chance to obtain more liens, and found that respondents had sufficiently alleged proximate cause because they were immediately injured by petitioners' scheme. The court also rejected petitioners' argument that respondents are not entitled to relief under RICO because they had not received, and therefore had not relied on, any false statements. From there, the case was appealed to the Supreme Court, which granted certiorari.

== Opinion of the court ==
The Supreme Court issued an opinion on June 9, 2008.
