= Jones v. Mississippi =

- Supreme Court of the United States

Argued November 3, 2020 Decided April 22, 2021
- Full case name: Brett Jones v. State of Mississippi
- Docket no.: 18-1259
- Citations: 593 U.S. 98 (more) 141 S. Ct. 1307; 209 L. Ed. 2d 390

Case history
- Prior: Defendant convicted in Lee County Circuit Court; conviction affirmed, Jones v. State, 938 So. 2d 312 (Miss. Ct. App. 2006); Denial of post-conviction relief affirmed, 122 So. 3d 725 (Miss. Ct. App. 2011); Affirmed in part, reversed in part, 122 So. 3d 698 (Miss. 2013); On remand, 285 So. 3d 626 (Miss. Ct. App. 2017); Cert. granted sub nom., Jones v. Mississippi, 140 S. Ct. 1293 (2020)

Holding
- When a minor commits a homicide, Miller and Montgomery do not require the sentencer to make a separate factual finding of "permanent incorrigibility" before sentencing the defendant to life without parole. In such a case, a discretionary sentencing system is both constitutionally necessary and constitutionally sufficient.

Court membership
- Chief Justice John Roberts Associate Justices Clarence Thomas · Stephen Breyer; Samuel Alito · Sonia Sotomayor; Elena Kagan · Neil Gorsuch; Brett Kavanaugh · Amy Coney Barrett

Case opinions
- Majority: Kavanaugh, joined by Roberts, Alito, Gorsuch, Barrett
- Concurrence: Thomas (in judgment)
- Dissent: Sotomayor, joined by Breyer, Kagan

Laws applied
- U.S. Const. amend. VIII

Jones v. Mississippi, 593 U.S. 98 (2021), was a United States Supreme Court case regarding the imposition of life sentences for juveniles. The Supreme Court had previously ruled in Miller v. Alabama in 2012 that mandatory life sentences without parole for juvenile offenders was considered cruel and unusual punishment outside of extreme cases of permanent incorrigibility, and made this decision retroactive in Montgomery v. Louisiana in 2016. In Jones, a juvenile offender who was 15 at the time of his offense, challenged his life sentence following Montgomery but was denied by the state. In a 6–3 decision with all six conservative justices upholding the life sentence without parole for Jones, the Court ruled that the states have discretionary ability to hold juvenile offenders to life sentences without parole without having to make a separate assessment of their incorrigibility.

== Background ==
On August 9, 2004, 15-year-old Mississippi resident Brett Jones (born July 17, 1989) fatally stabbed his grandfather Bertis after a confrontation over Brett's girlfriend. Jones claimed in court his action was in self-defense. In 2005, he was convicted in Lee County Circuit Court and sentenced to life in prison without the possibility of parole, the mandatory sentence under state law.

In 2012, the Supreme Court ruled in Miller v. Alabama that mandatory life sentences without the possibility of parole for juveniles was considered a cruel and unusual punishment under the Eighth Amendment to the United States Constitution, and that judges in such cases should be able to consider other factors that may influence such acts. The ruling of Miller v. Alabama was made retroactive to all previous cases in the Supreme Court's decision Montgomery v. Louisiana. The decision of Montgomery barred the use of life sentences without parole "for all but the rarest of juvenile offenders, those whose crimes reflect permanent incorrigibility". Following Miller and Montgomery, several states adjusted their laws to reflect the Court's rulings but Mississippi remained a state where life sentences could still be handed to juveniles determined to be incorrigible.

The state of Mississippi granted Jones a rehearing as a result of Montgomery, but still resentenced him to a life sentence without parole. According to Jones' lawyer, the state court failed to consider any aspect related to the "permanent incorrigibility" or potential for rehabilitation, thus violating the ruling from Montgomery, and thus sought appeals through the Supreme Court.

== Supreme Court ==
Prior to certifying Jones' case, the Supreme Court had been considering the case of Mathena v. Malvo (Docket 18-217), a similar case from Virginia involving Lee Boyd Malvo that raised the question if courts must determine if a juvenile is deemed incorrigible before passing a life sentence. Oral arguments had been held in October 2019, during which the Justices referred back to Montgomery; Justice Kavanaugh recognized that a ruling had to differentiate "someone who's merely immature as opposed to incorrigible". Due to a change in Virginia's state law, the case was rendered moot before the Court could deliver the opinion.

Jones' case was granted by the Supreme Court in March 2020. Oral arguments were held on November 3, 2020.

The Court issued its decision on April 22, 2021. The Court affirmed the Mississippi Court of Appeals decision to maintain Jones' life sentence in a 6–3 vote. Justice Brett Kavanaugh wrote the majority opinion, which was joined by Chief Justice John Roberts and Justices Samuel Alito, Neil Gorsuch, and Amy Coney Barrett. Justice Kavanaugh wrote in his opinion that "Determining the proper sentence in such a case raises profound questions of morality and social policy. The States, not the federal courts, make those broad moral and policy judgments in the first instance when enacting their sentencing laws. And state sentencing judges and juries then determine the proper sentence in individual cases in light of the facts and circumstances of the offense, and the background of the offender." As such, Kavanaugh concluded that "a discretionary sentencing system is both constitutionally necessary and constitutionally sufficient". Justice Clarence Thomas concurred in the judgment.

Justice Sonia Sotomayor wrote the dissenting opinion joined by Justices Stephen Breyer and Elena Kagan. Sotomayor wrote that the majority opinion was "an abrupt break from precedent". She continued that "The question is whether the state, at some point, must consider whether a juvenile offender has demonstrated maturity and rehabilitation sufficient to merit a chance at life beyond the prison in which he has grown up. For most, the answer is yes."

== See also ==
- Graham v. Florida (2010)
- Roper v. Simmons (2005)
