= Contingent interest =

A contingent interest is an interest which is uncertain, either as to the person who will enjoy it in possession or as to the event on which it will arise. 57 Am J1st Wills § 1217.

A future interest is contingent where the person to whom or the event upon which it is limited to take effect in possession or become a vested estate is uncertain. Caine v Payne, 86 App DC 404, 182 F2d 246, 20 ALR2d 823. If the condition upon which a future interest depends is precedent, the interest is contingent; if the condition is subsequent, the interest is vested, subject to defeasance. Anno: 131 ALR 712.
