= Opati v. Republic of Sudan =

- Supreme Court of the United States

Argued February 24, 2020 Decided May 18, 2020
- Full case name: Monicah Okoba Opati, In Her Own Right, and as Executrix of the Estate of Caroline Setla Opati, Deceased, et al., Petitioners v. Republic of Sudan, et al.
- Docket no.: 17-1268
- Citations: 590 U.S. 418 (more) 140 S. Ct. 1601

Case history
- Prior: Owens v. Republic of Sudan, 374 F. Supp. 2d 1 (D.D.C. 2005); 412 F. Supp. 2d 99 (D.D.C. 2006), affirmed, 531 F.3d 884 (D.C. Cir. 2008); cert. granted, 139 S. Ct. 2771 (2019).

Holding
- Plaintiffs in a federal cause of action under Foreign Sovereign Immunities Act §1605A(c) may seek punitive damages for preenactment conduct.

Court membership
- Chief Justice John Roberts Associate Justices Clarence Thomas · Ruth Bader Ginsburg; Stephen Breyer · Samuel Alito; Sonia Sotomayor · Elena Kagan; Neil Gorsuch · Brett Kavanaugh

Case opinion
- Majority: Gorsuch, joined by Roberts, Thomas, Ginsburg, Breyer, Alito, Sotomayor, Kagan
- Kavanaugh took no part in the consideration or decision of the case.

Laws applied
- Foreign Sovereign Immunities Act

Opati v. Republic of Sudan, 590 U.S. 418 (2020), was a United States Supreme Court case involving the Foreign Sovereign Immunities Act with its 2008 amendments, whether plaintiffs in federal lawsuits against foreign countries may seek punitive damages for cause of actions prior to enactment of the amended law, with the specific case dealing with victims and their families from the 1998 United States embassy bombings. The Court ruled unanimously in May 2020 that punitive damages can be sought from foreign nations in such cases for preenactment conduct.

== Background ==
The Foreign Sovereign Immunities Act (FSIA) was first enacted in 1976, generally treating foreign nations as having sovereign immunity from lawsuits within the United States but establishing conditions when a foreign state can be subject to judicial actions within the courts. FSIA has been amended over time to specify such conditions; relevant to this case, the Antiterrorism and Effective Death Penalty Act of 1996 and the Flatow Amendment allowed lawsuits to be taken against those countries that enabled acts of state-sponsored terrorism as designated by the State Department.

On August 7, 1998, more than 200 people were killed in simultaneous truck bombings of United States embassies in Kenya and Tanzania, including 12 American citizens, and thousands of others wounded. It was the first major attack of the al-Qaeda terrorist group.

Families and relatives of the killed Americans and those Americans injured in the attack filed a federal civil lawsuit against Sudan, who since 1993 had been listed by the State Department as a state sponsor of terrorism, and had since been linked to supporting al-Qaeda. The case Owens v. Republic of Sudan was filed in 2001 in the United States District Court for the District of Columbia.

As Owens progressed, legal questions of whether punitive damages could be sought for state-sponsored terrorism acts were raised from other similar cases, with the United States Circuit Court of the District of Columbia having ruled in Cicippio-Puleo v. Islamic Republic of Iran (353 F.3d 1024 (2004)) that even with the 1996 amended FSIA, there was no cause of action that could be brought under FSIA to foreign states, only to individuals of foreign states. Congress sought to rectify the Cicippio-Puleo decision in passing the National Defense Authorization Act for Fiscal Year 2008 (NDAA 2008) by including language to modify FSIA's terrorism exceptions. Among its major changes, the terrorism exceptions were moved a new section §1605A to make specific actions related to terrorism more explicit from other general FSIA provisions, defined that foreign states that sponsored terrorism could be taken to court on cause of action, and that these provisions could apply to prior lawsuits that had been "adversely affected" by the lack of these provisions as well as to new actions on related lawsuits.

With the NDAA 2008's passage in January 2008, numerous victims and families of those killed in the embassy bombings joined in the Owens suit or filed similar suits that were joined into the same action; ultimately, over 700 plaintiffs were on the final suit now under Opati v. Republic of Sudan. By 2014, the District Court entered its final judgement, awarding a total of US$10.2 billion in total damages for the plaintiffs, among which included US$4.3 billion as punitive damages.

During the case's history, Sudan had sent counsel to continue to challenge its position as a state-sponsor of terrorism or its ties to the embassy bombings. It appealed the District Court's ruling on grounds that the revived FSIA rules as changed by the NDAA 2008 did not allow for punitive damages to applied retroactively. The DC Circuit Court, in 2017, agreed with Sudan's position, and while still upholding Sudan's liability, reversed a portion of the District Court's ruling, reducing the total damages to about US$6 billion.

== Supreme Court ==
The plaintiffs in Opati petitioned the Supreme Court to review the case, which the Court accepted in June 2019; Justice Brett Kavanaugh, as a member of the DC Circuit Court at the time the case was heard there before being appointed to the Supreme Court, was recused.

Oral arguments were held on February 24, 2020. Court observers saw the Justices were focused primarily on the contradictions in Sudan's counsel's argument that punitive damages should not apply retroactively while compensatory damages should.

The Court delivered its ruling on May 18, 2020. The unanimous ruling, written by Justice Neil Gorsuch, vacated the DC Circuit's ruling, restoring the US$4.3 billion punitive award, and remanded the case back to the lower court. Gorsuch wrote that while the amendments were not explicit, "Congress was as clear as it could have been when it authorized plaintiffs to seek and win punitive damages for past conduct" in the 2008 language.
