= OBB Personenverkehr AG v. Sachs =

- Supreme Court of the United States

Argued October 5, 2015 Decided December 1, 2015
- Full case name: OBB PERSONENVERKEHR AG, Petitioner v. CAROL P. SACHS
- Docket no.: 13-1067
- Citations: 577 U.S. ___ (more) 136 S. Ct. 390; 193 L. Ed. 2d 269; 2015 U.S. LEXIS 7670; 84 U.S.L.W. 4011

Case history
- Prior: On writ of certiorari to the United States Court of Appeals for the Ninth Circuit, Sachs v. Republic of Austria, 737 F.3d 584 (9th Cir. 2013)

Holding
- Although the plaintiff purchased a rail ticket in the United States, an injury that occurred on a rail platform in Austria was "based upon" conduct that occurred solely in Austria; the plaintiff's suit therefore fell outside the Foreign Sovereign Immunities Act's commercial activity exception

Court membership
- Chief Justice John Roberts Associate Justices Antonin Scalia · Anthony Kennedy; Clarence Thomas · Ruth Bader Ginsburg; Stephen Breyer · Samuel Alito; Sonia Sotomayor · Elena Kagan

Case opinion
- Majority: Roberts, joined by unanimous

Laws applied
- 28 U.S.C. § 1605(a)(2) (Foreign Sovereign Immunities Act)

OBB Personenverkehr AG v. Sachs, 577 U.S. ___ (2015), is a decision by the Supreme Court of the United States, holding that the Foreign Sovereign Immunities Act barred a California resident from bringing suit against an Austrian railroad in federal district court. The case arose after a California resident suffered traumatic personal injuries while attempting to board a train in Innsbruck, Austria. She then filed a lawsuit against the railroad in the United States District Court for the Northern District of California in which she alleged the railroad was responsible for causing her injuries. Because the railroad was owned by the Austrian government, the railroad claimed that the lawsuit should be barred by the Foreign Sovereign Immunities Act, which provides immunity to foreign sovereigns in tort suits filed in the United States. In response, the plaintiff argued that her suit should be permitted under the Foreign Sovereign Immunity Act's commercial activity exception because she purchased her rail ticket in the United States.

Writing for a unanimous Court, Chief Justice John Roberts held that the plaintiff's injury was "based upon" conduct that occurred solely in Austria, and the suit therefore fell outside the Foreign Sovereign Immunities Act's commercial activity exception. Chief Justice Roberts emphasized that "the conduct constituting the gravamen of Sachs's suit plainly occurred abroad". Commentators have identified this case as part of "a series of rulings" in which the Supreme Court of the United States "has limited the use of U.S. courts as a forum for adjudicating wrongs that took place primarily outside the country". Although some analysts suggest the case has a "larger meaning", other analysts have described the Court's ruling as "less momentous than we might have expected".

== Background ==
=== Tort immunity for foreign sovereigns ===
The Foreign Sovereign Immunities Act of 1976 codified the longstanding common law principle that foreign sovereigns could not be held liable for torts in United States courts. After its enactment, the Act became "the sole basis for obtaining jurisdiction over a foreign state in [United States] courts". The Act states that United States courts may only exercise subject matter jurisdiction in cases brought by a private citizen against a foreign sovereign when the suit falls within one of the Act's enumerated exceptions. Absent subject matter jurisdiction, United States Courts may not exercise personal jurisdiction over a foreign sovereign. However, one of the Foreign Sovereign Immunity Act's enumerated exceptions is the commercial activity exception, which specifies that foreign sovereigns may be held liable in United States courts when "the action is based upon a commercial activity carried on in the United States by [a] foreign state". According to the Act, the definition of a "foreign state" also includes an "agency or instrumentality" of the foreign state.

=== Initial lawsuit ===
Carol Sachs, a resident of California, purchased a Eurail pass from a Massachusetts-based travel agent in March 2007. She arrived in Innsbruck, Austria, one month after purchasing her Eurail pass, where she intended to board a train operated by ÖBB Personenverkehr AG (ÖBB) bound for Prague. When Sachs attempted to board the train, she fell from the platform onto the tracks and suffered traumatic personal injuries. Sachs filed a lawsuit in the United States District Court for the Northern District of California in which she alleged ÖBB was responsible for causing her injuries. Although ÖBB was operated by the Austrian Ministry of Transport, Sachs argued her suit was not barred by the Foreign Sovereign Immunities Act because her suit was based upon the railway's act of selling her a Eurail pass in the United States. In response, ÖBB moved to dismiss the suit for lack of subject matter jurisdiction on the grounds that Sachs' suit was barred by sovereign immunity. The district court granted ÖBB's motion, and the United States Court of Appeals for the Ninth Circuit affirmed the district court's decision. However, the Ninth Circuit ordered the case to be reheard en banc, and a majority of judges reversed the panel's decision. The en banc majority concluded that Sachs' suit was permitted under the Foreign Sovereign Immunities Act's commercial activity exception because her claims were "based upon a commercial activity carried on in the United States by OBB". ÖBB then appealed to the Supreme Court of the United States, which granted certiorari on January 23, 2015.

== Opinion of the Court ==
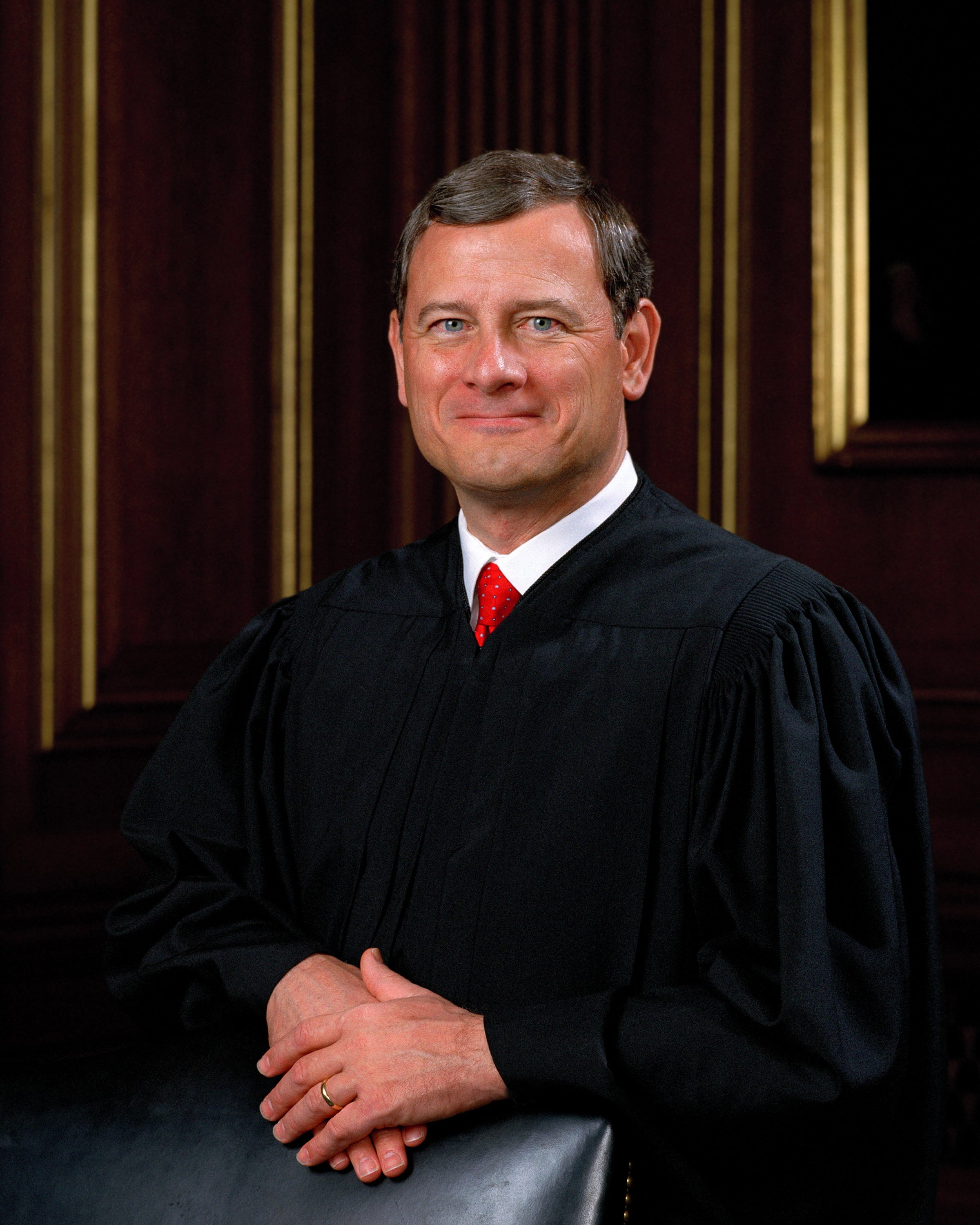
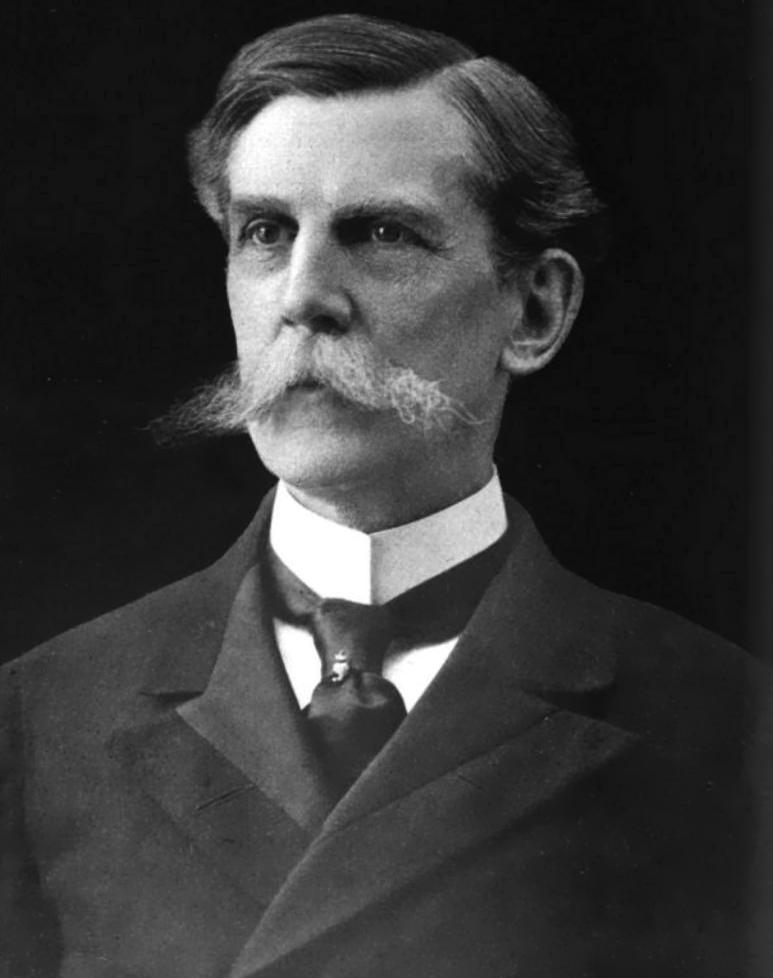
Writing for a unanimous court, Chief Justice John Roberts (pictured left) cited a letter written by former Supreme Court Justice Oliver Wendell Holmes Jr. (pictured right) to then-professor Felix Frankfurter, which explained that the "essentials of a personal injury narrative will be found at the point of contact – the place where the boy got his fingers pinched".

Writing for a unanimous Court, Chief Justice John Roberts held that Sachs' injury was "based upon" conduct that occurred solely in Austria, and the suit therefore fell outside the Foreign Sovereign Immunities Act's commercial activity exception. Although the Foreign Sovereign Immunities Act does not define the phrase "based upon" with specificity, Chief Justice Roberts explained that the Court's 1993 ruling in Saudi Arabia v. Nelson should guide the Court's analysis in this case. In Nelson, the Court held that the Saudi Arabian government was protected by sovereign immunity in a tort suit brought by an American who alleged he was tortured by Saudi police after reporting safety violations in a Saudi hospital. Although the plaintiff alleged the suit was based upon commercial activity that occurred when the Saudi hospital recruited the plaintiff in America, the Court ruled that the plaintiffs claims involved "sovereign acts" rather than commercial activity. The Court ultimately held that the Foreign Sovereign Immunity Act's "based upon" provision requires courts to identify the "particular conduct" upon which a plaintiff's claim is based.

Applying the Nelson analysis to the facts of this case, Chief Justice Roberts held that "the conduct constituting the gravamen of Sachs’s suit plainly occurred abroad". Justice Roberts also concluded that "[u]nder any theory of the case", there was "nothing wrongful about the sale of the Eurail pass standing alone". To support his arguments, Chief Justice Roberts cited a letter written by former Supreme Court Justice Oliver Wendell Holmes Jr. to then-professor Felix Frankfurter, which explained that the "essentials of a personal injury narrative will be found at the point of contact – the place where the boy got his fingers pinched". Chief Justice Roberts wrote that "[a]t least in this case, that insight holds true". Therefore, Chief Justice Roberts concluded that Sach's suit did not fall within the commercial activity exception of the Foreign Sovereign Immunities Act, and that the Ninth Circuit's opinion should be reversed for lack of jurisdiction.

== Analysis and commentary ==
Although some commentators suggested the Court's opinion may have a significant impact in tort cases involving foreign sovereigns, other commentators suggested the case's impact would be limited. Lyle Denniston, for example, noted that although "the case focused on one American and one incident, it may well have larger meaning" and that following the Court's opinion, foreign railroads "could rarely, if ever, be held accountable for causing injuries, or worse". However, Amy Howe wrote that the Court's decision "at first blush appears less momentous than we might have expected when the Court agreed to take the case on earlier this year". In The National Law Journal, Tony Mauro commented that the court's opinion was "the latest in a series of rulings in which the high court has limited the use of U.S. courts as a forum for adjudicating wrongs that took place primarily outside the country". Although she characterized the case as "a good decision by the Court", Ingrid Wuerth noted that the Court "left for another day" other cases "with less tangible injuries such as the misappropriation of trade secrets and other data or intellectual property-related actions, some of which may prove difficult to analyze under the Court's gravamen test".

Following the publication of the Court's opinion, Dorsey & Whitney LLP partner Juan C. Basombrio, who argued the case before the Supreme Court on behalf of ÖBB Personenverkehr, issued a press release that praised the Court's decision to respect "the importance of international comity". The press release also noted that "[i]n a world that has become increasingly connected by international commercial transactions, and where there is also increasing friction in the relations between the United States and other nations, this is a seminal and important decision that will foster harmony between the United States and other nations at least in the commercial context". Stanford Law School professor Jeffrey Fisher, who argued on behalf of Carol Sachs at the Supreme Court, stated that he was "deeply disappointed in the court's ruling". Fisher wrote that he "hoped the court would consider – as it often does – the totality of respondent's arguments in support of the holding below", but that "[t]he court's failure to do so means that the Ninth Circuit and other courts still have not been given guidance concerning how to resolve cases like this".

== See also ==
- List of United States Supreme Court cases
- Lists of United States Supreme Court cases by volume
- List of United States Supreme Court cases by the Roberts Court
