= Republic of Sudan v. Harrison =

2019 United States Supreme Court opinion

- Supreme Court of the United States

Argued November 7, 2018 Decided March 26, 2019
- Full case name: Republic of Sudan v. Rick Harrison
- Docket no.: 16-1094
- Citations: 587 U.S. ___ (more) 139 S. Ct. 1048; 203 L. Ed. 2d 433

Case history
- Prior: Harrison v. Republic of Sudan, 802 F.3d 399 (2d Cir. 2015); rehearing denied, 838 F.3d 86 (2d Cir. 2016); cert. granted, 138 S. Ct. 2671 (2018).

Holding
- Under the Foreign Sovereign Immunities Act, civil complaints and summons must be served directly to the foreign minister's office in the minister's home country, not to their home country's embassy within the United States.

Court membership
- Chief Justice John Roberts Associate Justices Clarence Thomas · Ruth Bader Ginsburg; Stephen Breyer · Samuel Alito; Sonia Sotomayor · Elena Kagan; Neil Gorsuch · Brett Kavanaugh

Case opinions
- Majority: Alito, joined by Roberts, Ginsburg, Breyer, Sotomayor, Kagan, Gorsuch, Kavanaugh
- Dissent: Thomas

Laws applied
- Foreign Sovereign Immunities Act

Republic of Sudan v. Harrison, 587 U.S. ___ (2019), was a United States Supreme Court case from the October 2018 term. The Court held that civil service of a lawsuit against the government of Sudan was invalid because the civil complaints and summons had been sent to the Embassy of Sudan in Washington, D.C. rather than to the Sudanese Foreign Minister in Khartoum.

This case is notable because it arose out of the bombing of the USS Cole, a terrorist attack perpetrated by Al-Qaeda in 2000. The United States federal government's decision to file a friend of the court brief supporting Sudan against a lawsuit filed by injured United States service members also sparked controversy. The administration's amicus curiae brief condemned the terrorist attack but argued that allowing service of process at embassies would undermine the principle of mission inviolability.

== Background ==
In October 2000, the USS Cole, a United States Navy destroyer, was attacked by suicide bombers in the port of Aden in Yemen. The blast killed 17 American sailors and injured 39 others. Though the attack was attributed to the terrorist group Al-Qaeda, family members of the slain sailors filed a lawsuit against the government of Sudan, accusing it of complicity and providing material support to the attackers.

Foreign governments are generally immune from lawsuits in United States courts; however, an exception exists under the Foreign Sovereign Immunities Act of 1976. This law allows for lawsuits against entities listed by the US State Department as state sponsors of terrorism.

In addition, the Justice Against Sponsors of Terrorism Act of 2016 allows for punitive damages against state sponsors of terrorism, and can be applied retroactively to incidents that took place before the law was enacted.

== In lower courts ==
In July 2004, family members of the sailors filed a lawsuit against Sudan for more than $100 million, alleging the Sudanese government provided support to the attackers and were complicit in the deaths of their relatives on the USS Cole. Though the doctrine of sovereign immunity generally bars lawsuits against foreign governments in US courts, the Foreign Sovereign Immunities Act creates an exception for countries designated as state sponsors of terrorism.

In March 2007, the district court found in favor of the sailors' families, ruling that Sudan was liable for the USS Cole attack after a two-day bench trial. The families sought up to $105 million in damages, but the damages were reduced to $13.4 million ($8 million in compensatory damages as well as $5.4 million in interest) as a result of the Death on the High Seas Act, which limited damages by disallowing emotional distress claims.

In 2010, a second lawsuit was filed against Sudan by 15 injured sailors and their families, seeking compensatory damages as well as punitive damages, which are permitted retroactively under the 2008 Justice Against Sponsors of Terrorism Act (JASTA). The complaint and civil summons were filed at the Sudanese embassy in Washington, DC, where they were accepted by a staffer at the embassy. In 2012, the plaintiffs in this suit prevailed in a default judgment and were awarded close to $315 million in compensatory and punitive damages following Sudan's failure to appear. To satisfy the claim, a federal judge ordered several banks (BNP Paribas SA, Credit Agricole SA and Mashreqbank PSC) to turn over Sudanese assets held in their custody.

Sudan then appealed the decision to United States Court of Appeals for the Second Circuit in 2014, claiming that proper procedures were not followed in serving the initial complaint in the 2010 case.

The case was heard by a three-judge panel comprising Circuit Court judges Denny Chin and Gerard E. Lynch as well as District Court Judge Edward R. Korman. Writing for a unanimous panel, Chin upheld the district court's ruling. Sudan appealed to the Supreme Court, which granted a writ of certiorari in 2018. Kannon Shanmugam, then a partner at the DC law firm Williams & Connolly, argued the case on behalf of Harrison. Christopher Curran of the New York City law firm White & Case, represented the government of Sudan. Assistant U.S. Solicitor General Erica Ross appeared on behalf of the United States government, presenting the United States's perspective in support of Sudan.

== Supreme court opinion ==
=== Majority opinion ===
In an 8-to-1 vote, the Supreme Court ruled that the plaintiffs failed to comply with the Foreign Sovereign Immunities Act (FSIA) when they sent their complaint and civil summons to the Sudanese embassy in DC rather than directly to the Sudanese Foreign Minister in Khartoum. Writing for the majority, Justice Samuel Alito ruled that the most 'natural' reading of the text of the FSIA was that the civil process had to be made directly to the foreign minister's office in the foreign state, and that the correct address for the foreign minister was the location that the foreign minister lived or worked—not the embassy. Alito's opinion also noted that this interpretation is consistent with the Vienna Convention on Diplomatic Relations as well as the United States's own policy of not accepting service at American embassies when the US government is sued overseas.

=== Dissent ===
In his dissenting opinion, Justice Clarence Thomas stated that, in the absence of an indication to the contrary, an embassy should be appropriate places to serve legal paper's to that country's foreign minister.

=== Effect ===
As a result of this opinion, the Second Circuit's ruling was reversed and the plaintiffs' award was overturned. The plaintiffs were however permitted to file suit again, either by serving the papers directly to the Sudanese foreign minister in Khartoum or asking the United States Secretary of State to do so via diplomatic channels.

In February 2020, Sudan announced that it would settle the case with the USS Cole victims for $30 million. Though Sudan continues to deny any involvement with the attack, Prime Minister Abdalla Hamdok stated that it would make the payment in order to normalize relations with the rest of the world and meet the US's conditions for removal from the list of state sponsors of terrorism. Sudan's announcement follows the ouster of its former president Omar al-Bashir and the inauguration of a new interim ruling council headed by Hamdok, as well as negotiations between Sudan and the United States to reestablish diplomatic relationships.

== See also ==
- Opati v. Republic of Sudan (2020) – A similar clase involving the Republic of Sudan and the Foreign Sovereign Immunities Act
- Republic of Austria v. Altmann (2004) – A similar case involving sovereign immunity and retroactive punitive damages under the Foreign Sovereign Immunities Act
