= Global policeman =

State that claims or seeks the right to intervene in the affairs of other states

Global policeman (or world police) is an informal term for a superpower which seeks or claims the right to intervene in other sovereign states. It has been used, firstly for the United Kingdom and, since 1945, for the United States.

The two terms hegemon and global policeman are not identical in meaning. The former term defines capacity for dominant control anywhere on earth, whereas the latter may also include small or large areas outside control, along with monitoring and attempted enforcements, but does not define any level of effectiveness.

== In international law ==
No formal recognition of this position exists. Theoretically, in international law, all nations are equal; "par in parem non habet imperium", no authority between equals, is the principle applied, although, in reality some states are relatively more powerful than others. States are "immortal" and cannot be indicted.

== Comparison with state policing ==
Within states, law restrains and limits power; between states, the opposite is true.

The Peelian principles of policing includes: the duty to prevent crime, keep the peace and uphold the law, with the consent of the public, and with minimal use of force and restraint; to act impartially; and not to usurp the powers of the judiciary. The latter standard requires a presumption of innocence. Candidates for police recruitment and promotion are appointed on merit, whereas a 'global policeman' is self-appointed faute de mieux.

Within states, a monopoly on violence is the norm; the police may carry weapons, but few others do so (the United States is an exception, prompting Charles Lane to ask if it is 'really a state'). Internationally, a 'global policeman' is but one heavily armed state among two hundred others.

To confer the role of 'global policeman' on any self-interested, expansionary state implies a conflict of interest. States wage war with maximum force; engage in arms sales; form alliances and thus lack impartiality.

== History ==
The United Kingdom made efforts to end the slave trade through the West Africa Squadron. In 1827, Britain, jointly with France and Russia, intervened on the side of Greek independence, destroying the Turkish fleet at the Battle of Navarino. During the Crimean War, the Russian Empire was forced to withdraw from Moldavia and Wallachia largely due to diplomatic pressure and the threat of intervention from Austria, while military intervention by Britain and France, including the Siege of Sevastopol, ultimately defeated Russia and preserved the Ottoman Empire.

From 1914–1945 no one state was hegemonic, with Britain's power decreasing, but still very much a leading, world role, and with rising powers such as the United States, the Empire of Japan, and later Nazi Germany and the Soviet Union. In an era of multipolarity and diffused responsibility, fascist dictators arose and Europe sank into two world wars. According to Richard J. Evans, "The authoritarian German challenge to democratic Britain then, is comparable to the authoritarian Chinese challenge to democratic America now."

Between the years 1945 and 1990, the world trade was dominated by the Soviet Union and the United States in what was known to be the Cold War.

The Truman Doctrine of 1947 promised assistance to anti-communist allies. "The right of neutrality was abolished... it was an era of aggressive peacetime policy which marked the beginning of America's role as global policeman." Since the end of the Cold War, "the enemy is terrorism, not communism". But after a disastrous intervention in Somalia in 1993, the United States was reluctant to engage in humanitarian intervention in Bosnia and Rwanda.

The US-led invasion of Iraq, officially a policing mission to find weapons of mass destruction, was, according to some, an illegal cover for ulterior, unethical motives: the need to secure US regional bases, oil supplies, and the loyalty of key allies.

Since then, serious doubts have been raised about the validity of US overseas intervention and destabilization in Iraq, Libya and Syria. As the 21st century progresses, the morality of global policing itself is increasingly in question, with the inevitable loss of self-determination by nations in which intervention occurs. Furthermore, with the advent of non-state threats to global security, prior legal justifications such as general "laws of war" are of questionable jurisdiction.

=== Modelski's long cycles theory ===
George Modelski defined global order as a 'management network centred on a lead unit and contenders for leadership, (pursuing) collective action at the global level'. The system is allegedly cyclical. Each cycle is about 100 years' duration and a new hegemonic power appears each time:

1. Portugal 1492–1580; in the Age of Discovery
2. The Netherlands 1580–1688; beginning with the Eighty Years' War, 1579–1588
3. United Kingdom (1) 1688–1792; beginning with the wars of Louis XVI
4. United Kingdom (2) 1792–1914; beginning with the French Revolution and Napoleonic Wars
5. The United States 1914–present; beginning with World War I and World War II

Each cycle has four phases:

1. Global War: This phase a) involves almost all global powers, b) is 'characteristically naval' c) is caused by a system breakdown, d) is extremely lethal, e) results in a new global leader, capable of tackling global problems. The war is a 'decision process' analogous to a national election. The Thirty Years War, though lasting and destructive, was not a 'global war'.
2. World Power: This phase lasts for 'about one generation'. The new incumbent power 'prioritises global problems', mobilises a coalition, is decisive and innovative. Pre-modern communities become dependent on the hegemonic power.
3. Delegitimation: This phase can last for 20–27 years; the hegemonic power falters, as rival powers assert new nationalistic policies.
4. Deconcentration: The hegemony's problem-solving capacity declines. It yields to a multipolar order of warring rivals. Pre-modern communities become less dependent. A challenger appears (successively, Spain, France, France, Germany, and the USSR) and a new global war ensues.

The hegemonic nations tend to have: 'insular geography'; a stable, open society; a strong economy; strategic organisation, and strong political parties. By contrast, the 'challenger' nations have: closed systems; absolute rulers; domestic instability; and continental geographic locations.

The long cycle system is repetitive, but also evolutionary. According to Modelski, it originated in about 1493 through: a) the decline of Venetian naval power, b) Chinese abandonment of naval exploration, and c) discovery of sea routes to India and the Americas. It has developed in parallel with the growth of the nation-state, political parties, command of the sea, and 'dependency of pre-modern communities'. The system is flawed, lacking in coherence, solidarity, and capacity to address the North-South divide. Modelski speculates that US deconcentration might be replaced by a power based in the 'Pacific rim' or by an explicit coalition of nations, as 'co-operation is urgently required in respect of nuclear weapons'.

Modelski 'dismisses the idea that international relations are anarchic'. His research, influenced by Immanuel Wallerstein, was 'measured in decades ... a major achievement' says Peter J. Taylor.

== See also ==
- Four Policemen
- Hegemony
- International law
- Non-Aligned Movement
- Pax Americana
- Peelian principles
- Polarity (international relations)
- Power politics
- Responsibility to protect
- Superpower collapse
- Team America: World Police, a 2004 American film that satirises the concept
- Thucydides Trap
- World peace
- World government
