= Stephen Flatow =

American lawyer

Stephen Flatow is an American lawyer notable for initiating a series of lawsuits targeting the Islamic Republic of Iran and several international banks that processed transactions on Iran's behalf.

Flatow is the father of Alisa Flatow, who was killed in a suicide bombing attack on a bus carried out by terrorists belonging to the Islamic Jihad Movement group near Kfar Darom in the Gaza Strip in 1995. After his daughter's death, Flatow commenced a series of lawsuits against the government of Iran. An amendment to the US Foreign Sovereign Immunities Act of 1976, which enabled Flatow to successfully sue Iran as a state sponsor of terrorism is named after him ("The Flatow Amendment").

Beginning in 2006, he has helped the United States government identify parties illegally processing financial transactions for Iran.

== A Father's Story ==
Flatow published a 2018 memoir, A Father’s Story: My Fight for Justice Against Iranian Terror, about his response to the murder of his daughter.
