= COVID-19 litigation involving China =

Multiple lawsuits have been filed in U.S. courts against the People's Republic of China (PRC) and the Chinese Communist Party (CCP) in connection with the global COVID-19 pandemic. Plaintiffs include individuals, businesses, nonprofit organizations, and state governments. The lawsuits seek damages for personal injuries, economic losses, and other alleged harms related to China's early handling of the outbreak. Some state-led cases allege that Chinese government entities hoarded personal protective equipment (PPE) and obstructed international mitigation efforts. The Foreign Sovereign Immunities Act of 1976 (FSIA) has been a key challenge in these suits.

== Background ==
The COVID-19 pandemic began in Wuhan, China, in December 2019 and quickly spread worldwide. On January 30, 2020, the World Health Organization (WHO) declared it a Public Health Emergency of International Concern (PHEIC), and on March 11, 2020, WHO declared it a global pandemic.

== Lawsuits by individuals and organizations ==
=== Alters v. People's Republic of China ===
Filed in March 2020 in the U.S. District Court for the Southern District of Florida, this national class action lawsuit alleges that various Chinese governmental entities—including the PRC, CCP, and Wuhan municipal authorities—failed to contain the virus and suppressed early information. The complaint states, "China's conduct caused massive harm to American lives and livelihoods." Judge Aileen M. Cannon authorized the plaintiffs to proceed with international service through the U.S. State Department. Summons for service abroad were issued in April 2024.

=== Buzz Photo v. People's Republic of China ===
In March 2020, Buzz Photo and Freedom Watch (under Larry Klayman) filed suit in the Northern District of Texas, alleging that COVID-19 originated from a bioweapons facility in Wuhan. The complaint alleged that COVID-19 was "designed by China to be a biological weapon of war."

=== Aharon v. Chinese Communist Party ===
Filed in April 2020 in the Southern District of Florida, this lawsuit alleges the CCP and affiliated entities stockpiled PPE and restricted exports at a time of global need. According to the complaint, "Defendants cornered the market on PPE by forbidding exports and directing Chinese-owned factories abroad to prioritize domestic needs." In January 2023, the U.S. Embassy in Beijing delivered court documents to China's Ministry of Foreign Affairs. In May 2025, Judge Roy K. Altman ruled that the hoarding of PPE constituted "commercial activity" under the FSIA, allowing the case to proceed.

=== Cardiff Prestige Property, Inc. v. People's Republic of China ===
In April 2020, a group of California-based businesses filed a class action in the Central District of California, claiming economic harm due to China's alleged negligence. The case was voluntarily dismissed without prejudice in July 2020.

== Lawsuits by state governments ==
=== Missouri v. People's Republic of China ===
Filed in April 2020 in the Eastern District of Missouri, the Missouri lawsuit alleged negligence and concealment by the PRC and CCP, including the hoarding of PPE. Missouri's complaint alleged that China knew of the threat and chose to hide it, allowing the virus to spread unchecked. In March 2025, the court issued a default judgment awarding Missouri over $24 billion. The U.S. Court of Appeals for the Eighth Circuit previously ruled that the PPE hoarding claims qualified for the "commercial activity" exception under FSIA, allowing the case to proceed.

=== Mississippi v. People's Republic of China ===
In May 2020, Mississippi filed suit in the Southern District of Mississippi, accusing the PRC and CCP of a deliberate cover-up and hoarding of PPE. The complaint alleged, "Defendants misled the world while securing supply chains and buying up global PPE." Mississippi's emergency management agency cited drastic cost increases due to shortages. In May 2025, the court entered a default notice in favor of Mississippi.

== See also ==
- Missouri v. China
- Foreign Sovereign Immunities Act
