= International Organizations Immunities Act =

1945 United States law

International Organizations Immunities Act of 1945

United States Supreme Court cases
- Elkins v. Moreno, 435 U.S. 647 (1978); Toll v. Moreno, 441 U.S. 458 (1979); Toll v. Moreno, 458 U.S. 1 (1982); Jam v. International Finance Corp., No. 17-1011, 586 U.S. ___ (2019)

The International Organizations Immunities Act (IOIA) is a United States federal law enacted in 1945. It "established a special group of foreign or international organizations whose members could work in the U.S. and enjoy certain exemptions from US taxes and search and seizure laws". These advantages are usually given to diplomatic bodies.

== Background information ==
The 79th United States Congress passed the IOIA on December 29, 1945; the Act can be found under Title 22, chapter 7, sub-chapter XVIII. The IOIA entitles international organizations and their employees to certain exemptions, immunities, and privileges that other organizations and their employees are not granted. In addition, the entitled benefits organizations and their employees receive are similar to the benefits that foreign governments are granted. For example, international organizations and employees of the organizations are exempted from certain taxes. In addition, property and assets belonging to international organizations or their employees cannot be searched or confiscated. A lawsuit or any other type of legal action cannot be brought upon these organizations or their employees. The privileges, exemptions, and immunities that the employees and officers receive are extended to their immediate family members as well.

The IOIA was passed to strengthen the international organizations that the U.S. collaborates with, including those that are located in foreign countries. The Senate Committee believed that passing this Act would allow international organizations to perform more effectively and accomplish their goals. The Food and Agriculture Organization, the International Labour Organization, and the United Nations are examples of designated public international organizations covered by the Act when it was passed.

If international organizations want the advantages listed in the title, they need to fit the Act's definition of what an "international organization" is. The IOIA states: "For the purposes of this title, the term "international organization" means a public international organization in which the United States participates pursuant to any treaty or under the authority of any Act of Congress authorizing such participation or making an appropriation for such participation..." (Section 1 of the Act). International organizations need to fit the definition to be protected by this particular Act. Although the Act initially aimed at international organizations of which the U.S. was a member, recent extensions have covered also international organizations with which the U.S. cooperates but in which they do not participate, such as the Hong Kong Economic and Trade Offices.

The IOIA also states powers of certain offices. Since the time it was passed, the Department of State has been the agency that receives applications from organizations requesting designation under the Act. The Secretary of State was given the power to advise the President (who makes the final decisions) on matters like whether an organization should or should not be granted protection under the IOIA. The Secretary of State also has the power to determine if an employee's presence is no longer "desirable"; in such instances, the Secretary of State can have the employee deported (the international organization, however, has to be notified first and the employee has to be allotted a reasonable time to leave). Besides designating the status of international organizations, the President has the authority to withhold an organization or employees from receiving certain immunities, exemptions, and privileges the Act offers. The President can also limit the benefits an organization or its employees receives. In addition, the President has the power to revoke a designation if an international organization abuses the powers that it is given, which means the organization would no longer enjoy any of the benefits listed in the title.

== Privileges, exemptions, and immunities of the act ==
International organizations receive the same privileges, immunities, and exemptions as foreign governments. Some of these privileges, immunities, and exemptions (listed under section 4 of the Act) include:

- Immunity from search and confiscation of any property and assets owned (unless immunity is waived)
- Exemption from any internal-revenue taxes imposed
- Free from baggage search and any other procedures related to customs duties

Employees and officers of international organizations designated under the Act also receive benefits. Even though, the Act provides employees, officers, and their family members many benefits, it does not grant full diplomatic immunity. Moreover, any of the rights granted can be waived. Also, organizations and their employees can only receive these benefits if the Secretary of State notifies and acknowledges the international organization and its workers. The benefits that employees and officials enjoy include:

- Exemption from property taxes imposed by Congress, internal-revenue taxes, communication taxes and taxes on transportation of persons or property
- Admission of officers and employees representing international organizations without checks from customs
- Exemption from legal suits or any other legal action in regards to activities related to work (unless the right is waived)
- Family members of employees and officers of international organizations receive similar privileges, immunities, and exemptions as well.

Many of these benefits of employees and officials, however, do not apply to U.S. citizens (including dual citizens). More specifically, the salary of a person working for an international organization within the United States is exempt from U.S. tax under the condition that the person is either not a U.S. citizen, or is a U.S. citizen as well as a citizen of The Philippines. Furthermore, a U.S. citizen working for an international organization in the U.S. must report self-employment income and pay self-employment tax; a U.S. citizen working for an international organization outside of the U.S. does not pay self-employment tax, nor does a green card holder working for an international organization in the U.S.

== Designated Organizations ==
International organizations (and their employees) enjoying these benefits include the following.

- African Development Bank
- African Development Fund
- African Union
- Asian Development Bank
- Border Environment Cooperation Commission
- Caribbean Organization
- Commission for Environmental Cooperation
- Commission for Labor Cooperation
- Commission for the Study of Alternatives to the Panama Canal
- Council of Europe in Respect of the Group of States Against Corruption
- Customs Cooperation Council
- Ethiopian World Federation.
- European Bank for Reconstruction and Development.
- European Central Bank
- European Space Agency
- Food and Agriculture Organization
- Global Fund to Fight AIDS, Tuberculosis and Malaria
- Great Lakes Fishery Commission
- Hong Kong Economic and Trade Offices
- Inter-American Defense Board
- Inter-American Development Bank
- Inter-American Institute of Agricultural Sciences
- Inter-American Investment Corporation
- Inter-American Statistical Institute
- Inter-American Tropical Tuna Commission
- Intergovernmental Committee for European Migration (Note: formerly known as Provisional Intergovernmental Committee for the Movement of Migrants from Europe)
- Intergovernmental Maritime Consultative Organization
- International Atomic Energy Agency
- International Bank for Reconstruction and Development
- International Boundary and Water Commission, United States and Mexico
- International Centre for Settlement of Investment Disputes
- International Civil Aviation Organization
- International Civilian Office in Kosovo
- International Coffee Organization
- International Committee of the Red Cross
- International Cotton Advisory Committee
- International Cotton Institute
- International Criminal Police Organization (Interpol) (Note: limited privileges)
- International Development Association
- International Development Law Institute
- International Fertilizer Development Center
- International Finance Corporation
- International Food Policy Research Institute
- International Fund for Agricultural Development
- International Hydrographic Bureau
- International Joint Commission—United States and Canada
- International Labour Organization
- International Maritime Satellite Organization
- International Monetary Fund
- International Pacific Halibut Commission
- International Renewable Energy Agency
- International Secretariat for Volunteer Service
- International Telecommunication Union
- International Telecommunications Satellite Organization (Intelsat)
- International Union for Conservation of Nature and Natural Resources
- International Wheat Advisory Committee (International Wheat Council)
- Interparliamentary Union
- Israel-United States Binational Industrial Research and Development Foundation
- ITER International Fusion Energy Organization
- Korean Peninsula Energy Development Organization
- Multilateral Investment Guarantee Agency
- Multinational Force and Observers
- North American Development Bank
- North Pacific Anadromous Fish Commission
- North Pacific Marine Science Organization
- Office of the High Representative in Bosnia and Herzegovina
- Organisation for Economic Co-operation and Development (Note: formerly known as the Organization for European Economic Cooperation)
- Organisation for the Prohibition of Chemical Weapons
- Organization of American States (including Pan American Union)
- Organization of Eastern Caribbean States
- Pacific Salmon Commission
- Pan American Health Organization
- Preparatory Commission of the International Atomic Energy Agency
- South Pacific Commission
- United International Bureau for the Protection of Intellectual Property
- United Nations
- United Nations Educational, Scientific, and Cultural Organization
- United Nations Industrial Development Organization
- United States-Mexico Border Health Commission
- Universal Postal Union
- World Health Organization
- World Intellectual Property Organization
- World Meteorological Organization
- World Organisation for Animal Health
- World Tourism Organization
- World Trade Organization

== Recent activity ==
=== State and local taxation ===
In 1992, when the State of Maryland changed its income tax laws with retroactive effect, several international organizations pointed out that their foreign employees were exempt from income taxes due to the relevant treaty and that, while the IOIA shielded them from federal taxes, this was not the case for state and local taxes. Subsequently, on May 14, 1994, the President signed and brought into force the Agreement on State and Local Taxation of Foreign Employees of Public International Organizations.

=== Attempt to amend the act ===
A bill called H.R. 3269 was introduced to the 109th United States Congress on July 13, 2005. The bill called for an amendment in the International Organization Immunities Act so the Bank for International Settlements would be recognized as an international organization under the Act. The United States House of Representatives passed the H.R. 3269 bill on December 6, 2005. The Senate referred the bill to the Committee on Foreign Relations; that was the last action taken regarding H.R. 3269. As a result, the bill did not become a law.

=== Interpol controversy ===
In 1983, President Ronald Reagan extended certain benefits to the International Criminal Police Organization(Interpol). Some of these benefits included immunity from lawsuits and prosecution. Likewise in 2009, President Barack Obama granted certain benefits found in the IOIA to Interpol. Conservative bloggers and people such as former Speaker Newt Gingrich did not support the President extending privileges, exemptions, and immunities to Interpol. Conservative bloggers claimed that by increasing the privileges and immunities Interpol received, the President was allowing an international police to run amok without legal restraint. They also believe that it is a plot to allow international courts to arrest and prosecute American officials.

Government and Interpol officials claim people are overreacting and are against Interpol receiving privileges, immunities, and exemptions because they do not know how Interpol functions. For example, Interpol does not make arrests (a common misconception) and it does not have a police force. Instead, Interpol shares information and files with the 188 countries it serves. Rachel Billington states that the national police force makes arrests based on national laws.

=== Jam v. International Finance Corporation (IFC) ===
In 2019, the United States Supreme Court ruled that the IOIA did not grant international organizations absolute immunity. Rather, it ruled that, like foreign governments, international organizations could be sued under federal law for their commercial activities. This was a rejection of longstanding jurisprudence which held that international organizations shared the same expansive sovereign immunity enjoyed by foreign governments in 1945 (when the IOIA was first enacted) even though Congress had placed restrictions on foreign governments' sovereign immunity in subsequent legislation, including the Foreign Sovereign Immunities Act.

== See also ==
- 22 U.S.C. § 288
- Persons Employed by a Foreign Government or International Organization
