= China v. Missouri =

2025 Chinese lawsuit against Missouri

China v. Missouri (formally People’s Government of Wuhan Municipality, et al. v. The State of Missouri, et al.) is a lawsuit filed in December 2025 by the municipal government of Wuhan, the Chinese Academy of Sciences, and the Wuhan Institute of Virology against the U.S. state of Missouri and several state officials. Filed in the Intermediate People's Court of Wuhan, the suit characterizes Missouri's prior legal actions regarding the COVID-19 pandemic as an "economic and reputational menace" and seeks over $50 billion in damages.

The filing followed a $24 billion default judgment awarded to Missouri by a U.S. federal court earlier in 2025, a move characterized by the Associated Press and state officials as a retaliatory measure.

== Background ==
In 2020, Missouri became the first U.S. state to sue the Chinese government over its handling of the COVID-19 pandemic (Missouri v. China). In March 2025, a judge in the United States District Court for the Eastern District of Missouri entered a default judgment ordering China to pay approximately $24 billion in damages related to the hoarding of PPE.

In December 2025, the PRC initiated legal proceedings in Wuhan, serving Missouri officials via a diplomatic service packet transmitted through the U.S. State Department.

== The lawsuit ==
=== Plaintiffs ===
The lawsuit was brought by three plaintiffs:

- People's Government of Wuhan Municipality
- Chinese Academy of Sciences
- Wuhan Institute of Virology

=== Defendants ===
- The State of Missouri, represented by the Governor
- Eric Schmitt, former Attorney General and current U.S. Senator
- Andrew Bailey, former Attorney General
- The Office of the Missouri Attorney General

=== Allegations ===
The plaintiffs allege that Missouri's litigation and public statements "fabricated enormous disinformation" and constituted "stigmatizing and discriminating slanders." The filing claims these actions damaged the "soft power" of the city of Wuhan and harmed the reputation of the Wuhan Institute of Virology.

=== Relief sought ===
The lawsuit seeks a total of 356.4 billion RMB (approximately $50.5 billion USD) in compensatory damages. Furthermore, the plaintiffs demand that the defendants issue public apologies on several global and domestic platforms.

== Reactions ==
Missouri Attorney General Catherine Hanaway called the lawsuit "frivolous" and a "stalling tactic," asserting that "China is now using their own courts to try to intimidate us." Senator Eric Schmitt dismissed the lawsuit as a "badge of honor."

Legal experts noted that the suit appears designed to utilize China's 2023 Foreign State Immunity Law, which allows for "reciprocal" judicial action against foreign states that do not respect China's sovereign immunity. This move is expected to complicate Missouri's efforts to seize Chinese assets to satisfy the prior $24 billion judgment.

== See also ==
- Missouri v. China
- COVID-19 pandemic in the United States
- Foreign Sovereign Immunities Act
