= Samantar v. Yousuf =

- Supreme Court of the United States

Argued March 3, 2010 Decided June 1, 2010
- Full case name: Mohamed Ali Samantar, Petitioner v. Bashe Abdi Yousuf, et al.
- Docket no.: 08-1555
- Citations: 560 U.S. 305 (more) 130 S. Ct. 2278; 176 L. Ed. 2d 1047

Case history
- Prior: Yousuf v. Samantar, 552 F.3d 371 (4th Cir. 2009); cert. granted, 557 U.S. 965 (2009).

Holding
- The FSIA's immunity for a "foreign state" does not include an official acting on behalf of that state.

Court membership
- Chief Justice John Roberts Associate Justices John P. Stevens · Antonin Scalia; Anthony Kennedy · Clarence Thomas; Ruth Bader Ginsburg · Stephen Breyer; Samuel Alito · Sonia Sotomayor

Case opinions
- Majority: Stevens, joined by Roberts, Kennedy, Ginsburg, Breyer, Alito, Sotomayor
- Concurrence: Alito
- Concurrence: Thomas (in part)
- Concurrence: Scalia (in judgment)

Laws applied
- Foreign Sovereign Immunities Act

Samantar v. Yousuf, 560 U.S. 305 (2010), is a decision by the United States Supreme Court in which the court held that the Foreign Sovereign Immunities Act's immunity for a "foreign state" does not include an official acting on behalf of that state. The FSIA provides that a "foreign state shall be immune from the jurisdiction" of both federal and state courts except as provided in the act.

The case concerned whether Muhammad Ali Samatar, prime minister of Somalia (during the dictatorship of Siad Barre) from 1987 to 1990, could be sued in United States courts for allegedly overseeing killings and other atrocities. Samatar then lived in Virginia, and some of his victims had sued him under the Torture Victim Protection Act of 1991.

In a previous decision, the United States Court of Appeals for the Fourth Circuit held that the former Somali government official is not covered by, and therefore not entitled to immunity under the Foreign Sovereign Immunities Act. The Court remanded to District Court to determine whether defendant is entitled to common law immunity.

== See also ==
- Jones v. Ministry of Interior for the Kingdom of Saudi Arabia (comparable 2006 decision of the House of Lords)
