= Republic of Argentina v. NML Capital, Ltd. =

- Supreme Court of the United States

Argued April 21, 2014 Decided June 16, 2014
- Full case name: Republic of Argentina v. NML Capital, Ltd.
- Docket no.: 12-842
- Citations: 573 U.S. 134 (more) 134 S. Ct. 2250; 189 L. Ed. 2d 234
- Argument: Oral argument

Case history
- Prior: EM Ltd. v. Republic of Argentina, 695 F.3d 201 (2d Cir. 2012)

Holding
- No provision in the FSIA immunizes a foreign-sovereign judgment debtor from post judgment discovery of information concerning its extraterritorial assets.

Court membership
- Chief Justice John Roberts Associate Justices Antonin Scalia · Anthony Kennedy; Clarence Thomas · Ruth Bader Ginsburg; Stephen Breyer · Samuel Alito; Sonia Sotomayor · Elena Kagan

Case opinions
- Majority: Scalia, joined by Roberts, Kennedy, Thomas, Breyer, Alito, Kagan
- Dissent: Ginsburg
- Sotomayor took no part in the consideration or decision of the case.

Laws applied
- Foreign Sovereign Immunities Act

Republic of Argentina v. NML Capital, Ltd., 573 U.S. 134 (2014), is a U.S. Supreme Court opinion regarding foreign sovereign immunity. After defaulting on its debt and losing a federal collection action, Argentina claimed that its foreign assets were immune from discovery. The Court found that no such immunity existed.

On the same day as it announced this opinion the Supreme Court denied Argentina's appeal of a court order prohibiting Argentina from giving preference to certain creditors. This was the third case involving Argentina that term, with BG Group Plc v. Republic of Argentina involving Argentina's refusal to obey a neutral arbitrator's order and Daimler AG v. Bauman involving atrocities committed by the Argentinian military junta during its Dirty War.

== Background ==
In 2001 Argentina was in a severe economic depression. NML Capital, a 'vulture fund' that specializes in distressed sovereign debt, purchased Argentine public bonds at extreme discounts off a panicking market. Argentina then defaulted on $103 billion of debt. After announcing that it would not pay its debts, Argentina offered its creditors a choice during the 2005 debt restructuring: par bonds due in 2038 or 70% discount debt maturing in 2033, with warrants that paid investors based on annual economic growth issued with the bonds as part of the same offer. In 2012, Morgan Stanley estimated that those creditors that accepted the 2005 debt swap offer obtained 90% returns on their investment, above the average for emerging market debt (70% returns) during the same period. The vast majority of bondholders accepted the new bonds. NML Capital did not.

Instead, NML Capital brought a collection action against Argentina in Manhattan federal district court. Finding that Argentina did have to pay its debt, District Judge Thomas Griesa ordered Argentina to pay plaintiff $2.4 billion and, pari passu, to stop favoring other creditors over NML Capital.

Argentina responded by pulling its assets out of the United States. Seeking to satisfy the judgment order, NML Capital undertook a worldwide search for Argentina's assets, at one point convincing Ghana to seize the Argentine Navy's ARA Libertad and forcing Argentina's president to charter private airplanes to avoid having her state aircraft confiscated.

As part of its search for attachable assets NML Capital served subpoenas on Bank of America and Banco de la Nación Argentina. Argentina moved to quash, claiming that as a sovereign the locations of its assets were immune from discovery. Judge Griesa disagreed, ordering discovery on all assets "reasonably calculated to lead to attachable property." On Argentina's appeal the Second Circuit affirmed the discovery order. Still refusing to comply, Argentina then petitioned for a writ of certiorari from the Supreme Court of the United States, and the petition was granted. Arguments were held on April 21, 2014, with Deputy Solicitor General Edwin Kneedler appearing as a friend supporting Argentina and Theodore Olson appearing for the hedge funds.

== Opinion ==
The Supreme Court affirmed, with Justice Scalia writing for the seven member majority. Scalia first traces the history of foreign sovereign immunity in the United States, from initially undisturbed Executive discretion, to the "muddling" noncommercial acts distinction the State Department adopted in 1952, to Congress's creation of the "comprehensive " Foreign Sovereign Immunities Act of 1976.

Scalia then turns to the statute's text finding the FSIA does not expressly address post judgment discovery. Argentina claimed that there is "meaning from this silence ", and since discovery is not expressly permitted it is, then, prohibited. Scalia disagrees. Emphasizing that FSIA is the comprehensive framework for sovereign immunity, Scalia finds that any claimed immunity must stand or fall on the Act's text alone. Noting that the "riddle " of Congress's motive was not "ours to solve ", Scalia found that since Congress did not mention foreign sovereign immunity from post judgment discovery in the Act, there can be no such immunity.

== Dissent ==
Justice Ginsburg dissented. Noting that FISA and international law only allow the attachment of commercial property, Ginsburg objected to the discovery order's "unlimited inquiry ". Because NML Capital had offered no proof that foreign noncommercial assets were subject to attachment, Ginsburg questioned what authorization a US court could have to act as a "clearinghouse for information " about Argentina's noncommercial property.

== Reaction ==
One month later Argentina, again, defaulted on its debt. Argentina then unsuccessfully attempted to sue the United States at the Hague for "judicial malevolence". The United Nations General Assembly condemned debt collection on sovereign debt. After Argentina continued to refuse to follow court orders, Judge Griesa held it in contempt. Creditors worldwide imitated NML Capital, with Argentina losing lawsuits to creditors in Germany and England.

On November 22, 2015, Argentina elected Mauricio Macri as its new president. By February 19, 2016, Argentina had reached a settlement with its bondholders and Judge Griesa lifted his injunction. On April 13, the Second Circuit affirmed, from the bench, directly after hearing oral arguments.

== See also ==
- List of United States Supreme Court cases, volume 573
