= State immunity =

Legal doctrine

The doctrine and rules of state immunity concern the protection which a state is given from being sued in the courts of other states. The rules relate to legal proceedings in the courts of another state, not in a state's own courts. The rules developed at a time when it was thought to be an infringement of a state's sovereignty to bring proceedings against it or its officials in a foreign country.

There is now a trend in various states towards substantial exceptions to the rule of immunity; in particular, a state can be sued when the dispute arises from a commercial transaction entered into by a state or some other "non-sovereign activity" of a state. The United Nations Convention on Jurisdictional Immunities of States and their Property, which as of 2024 is not yet in force, would re-formulate and harmonise the rules and their exceptions. It does not cover criminal proceedings and it does not allow civil (e.g. financial) actions for human rights abuses against state agents where the abuse has occurred in another country.

In 1938, Lord Atkin observed in the House of Lords, the highest court at the time in the United Kingdom, the following:

The courts of a country will not impede a foreign sovereign, that is, they will not by their process make him against his will a party to legal proceedings whether the proceedings involve process against his person or seek to recover from him specific property or damages.

The rule's wider implication is that a state and any sovereign, unless it chooses to waive its immunity, is immune to the jurisdiction of foreign courts and the enforcement of court orders. So jealously guarded is the law, traditionally the assertion of any such jurisdiction is considered impossible without the foreign power's consent.

== Arguments for and against exceptions ==
Some commentators argue states should not be immune to cases relating to serious human rights abuses. They argue that fundamental human rights such as the right to life and the prohibition against torture should take precedence over rules of state immunity (in technical terms, they constitute norms of jus cogens). Others point out that state immunity should be the exception that warrants proper justification, without which all states should be subject to liability.

Opponents of this type of exception point out that civil actions brought by disgruntled individuals in one country against another state can have grave political and economic repercussions for both states; and civil proceedings can raise difficult issues of enforcement and extraterritorial jurisdiction. They argue a sovereign immunity exception should be made in each country's domestic law, so that country's definition of abuse, standard of proof, and rules of evidence apply.

== In practice ==
Under customary international law, countries are normally immune from legal proceedings in another state.

Sovereign immunity is sometimes available to countries in international courts and international arbitration; principally not however if acting more as contracting bodies (e.g. making agreements with regard to extracting oil and selling it) nor in boundaries matters.

On 3 February 2012, in the case of Germany v. Italy: Greece intervening, the International Court of Justice ruled by a majority of 12 to 3 that all attempts by domestic courts, forums and tribunals attempting to supranationally apply jus cogens relating to international humanitarian law are overridden by state immunity. The case affirms case law from earlier decisions. The decision was criticized by some commentators for not embracing a nascent movement to waive immunity in cases of human rights violations. Others pointed out that the decision reflected the consensus of actual international custom and practice.

The jurisdiction of the International Criminal Court extends to current heads of state and government of states that are members of the court. Though cases might include acts that leaders take in their official capacities (such as ordering the country's military to commit genocide), they are prosecuted against individuals rather than the country's government as a whole.

=== United States ===
The 1812 U.S. Supreme Court decision The Schooner Exchange v. M'Faddon interpreted customary international law to bar a ship owner from suing to regain a vessel seized by the government of France, which had docked for repairs in Philadelphia.

The 1976 Foreign Sovereign Immunities Act generally bars suits against foreign governments, except in cases where state immunity is waived; in certain admiralty claims; or in claims involving commercial activity, a tort inside the United States involving death, personal injury, or damage to or loss of property (such as a traffic collision), or expropriation of property in violation of international law. Section 221 of the Antiterrorism and Effective Death Penalty Act of 1996 added an exception for U.S. victims of terrorism, for any government designated by the State Department as a state sponsor of terrorism. The National Defense Authorization Act for Fiscal Year 2008 added exceptions for torture, extrajudicial killing, aircraft sabotage, and hostage-taking. In 2016, the Justice Against Sponsors of Terrorism Act removed the requirement that a state sponsor of terrorism be officially listed, so that victim families of the September 11 attacks could sue Saudi Arabia.

== European Convention on State Immunity ==
The European Convention on State Immunity was signed in Basel on 16 May 1972 and is currently in force in eight countries: Austria, Belgium, Cyprus, Germany, Luxembourg, Netherlands (for the European Netherlands), Switzerland, and the United Kingdom. Six of those (Austria, Belgium, Cyprus, Netherlands, Luxembourg and Switzerland) also are parties to its Additional Protocol, that establishes the European Tribunal in matters of State Immunity.

== United Nations Convention on Jurisdictional Immunities of States and Their Property ==
The United Nations Convention on Jurisdictional Immunities of States and Their Property was adopted by the General Assembly on 2 December 2004 but is yet to come into force.

The Convention was open for signature by all States until 17 January 2007 and may enter into force on the thirtieth day following the date of deposit of the thirtieth instrument of ratification, acceptance, approval or accession. As of September 2026, the Convention has 28 signatories and 25 parties.

== See also ==
- Immunity from prosecution (international law)
- Foreign Sovereign Immunities Act (United States)
- Extraterritorial jurisdiction
- Par in parem non habet imperium
