= Republic of Iraq v. Beaty =

- Supreme Court of the United States

Decided June 8, 2009
- Full case name: Republic of Iraq v. Beaty
- Citations: 556 U.S. 848 (more)

Holding
- The EWSAA gave the president the authority to restore the sovereign immunity of Iraq. Accordingly, Americans do not have a right to sue the Iraqi government for torture and other abuse committed under Saddam Hussein.

Court membership
- Chief Justice John Roberts Associate Justices John P. Stevens · Antonin Scalia; Anthony Kennedy · David Souter; Clarence Thomas · Ruth Bader Ginsburg; Stephen Breyer · Samuel Alito

Case opinion
- Majority: Scalia, joined by unanimous

Laws applied
- Emergency Wartime Supplemental Appropriations Act

Republic of Iraq v. Beaty, 556 U.S. 848 (2009), was a United States Supreme Court case in which the court held that the Emergency Wartime Supplemental Appropriations Act gave the president the authority to restore the sovereign immunity of Iraq. Accordingly, Americans do not have a right to sue the post-occupation Iraqi government for torture and other abuse committed under Saddam Hussein.

== Background ==
The Foreign Sovereign Immunities Act of 1976 (FSIA) prohibits suits against other countries in American courts, with certain exceptions. One exception, (Note: This exception had been repealed by 2009.) stripped a foreign state of immunity in any suit arising from certain acts of terrorism that occurred when the state was designated as a sponsor of terrorism under §6(j) of the Export Administration Act of 1979 or §620A of the Foreign Assistance Act of 1961.

Iraq was designated as a sponsor of terrorism in 1990, but in 2003, following the American-led invasion of Iraq, Congress enacted the Emergency Wartime Supplemental Appropriations Act (EWSAA), §1503 of which included a proviso clause (the second in a series of eight) authorizing the president to "make inapplicable with respect to Iraq [§]620A of the Foreign Assistance Act of 1961 or any other provision of law that applies to countries that have supported terrorism." Although President George W. Bush exercised that authority, the D.C. Circuit held in Acree v. Republic of Iraq that the EWSAA did not permit the president to waive §1605(a)(7), and thereby restore Iraq's sovereign immunity, for claims arising from actions Iraq took while designated as a sponsor of terrorism.

Thereafter, Congress repealed §1605(a)(7) in §1083(b)(1)(A)(iii) of the National Defense Authorization Act for Fiscal Year 2008 (NDAA) and replaced it with a new, roughly similar exception, §1083(a). The NDAA also declared that nothing in EWSAA "ever authorized, directly or indirectly, the making inapplicable of any provision of [the FSIA] or the removal of the jurisdiction of any court" (thus purporting to ratify Acree), §1083(c)(4); and authorized the president to waive "any provision of this section with respect to Iraq" under certain conditions, §1083(d). On the same day the President signed the NDAA into law he also waived all of §1083's provisions as to Iraq.

Respondents including Beaty filed these suits against Iraq in early 2003, alleging mistreatment by Iraqi officials during and after the 1991 Gulf War. Under Acree, the courts below refused to dismiss either case on jurisdictional grounds. The D.C. Circuit also rejected Iraq's alternative argument that even if §1605(a)(7)'s application to it survived the President's EWSAA waiver, the provision was repealed by NDAA §1083(b)(1)(A)(iii); and that the president had waived NDAA §1083(a)'s new exception with respect to Iraq under his §1083(d) authority. The court held instead that it retained jurisdiction over cases pending against Iraq when the NDAA was enacted.

The case was appealed to the Supreme Court, which granted certiorari.

== Opinion of the court ==
The Supreme Court issued an opinion on June 8, 2009.

== Later developments ==
Chief Justice John Roberts was sitting on the D.C. Circuit panel that decided Acree in 2004. He concurred with the decision, but he suggested that the D.C. Circuit should have adopted his "straightforward" reading of the statute. Justice Scalia's opinion in Beaty did adopt Robert's reading and spent much of the rest of its time criticizing the Acree decision. Given that the Beaty decision was, on the whole, a relitigation of Acree, Roberts received some criticism suggesting that he should have recused himself in this case.
