= Foreign Cultural Exchange Jurisdictional Immunity Clarification Act =

Legislation of the 113th United States Congress

- Long title: To amend chapter 97 of title 28, United States Code, to clarify the exception to foreign sovereign immunity set forth in section 1605(a)(3) of such title.
- Announced in: the 113th United States Congress
- Sponsored by: Rep. Steve Chabot (R, OH-1)
- Number of co-sponsors: 3

Codification
- U.S.C. sections affected: 28 U.S.C. § 1605, 22 U.S.C. § 2459, 28 U.S.C. § 1603
- Agencies affected: Executive Office of the President

Legislative history
- Introduced in the House as H.R. 4292 by Rep. Steve Chabot (R, OH-1) on March 25, 2014; Committee consideration by United States House Committee on the Judiciary, United States House Judiciary Subcommittee on the Constitution and Civil Justice

The Foreign Cultural Exchange Jurisdictional Immunity Clarification Act (H.R. 4292) is a bill that was introduced into the United States House of Representatives during the 113th United States Congress. Under current law, works of art loaned by foreign governments generally are immune to certain decisions made by federal courts and cannot be confiscated if the President, or the President’s designee, determines that display of the works is in the national interest. However, commercial activity in which foreign governments are engaged does not have immunity in federal courts. H.R. 4292 would clarify that importing works of art into the United States for temporary display is not a commercial activity, and thus that such works would be immune from seizure.

== Background ==
A similar bill was passed by the House during the 112th United States Congress.

== Provisions of the bill ==
This summary is based largely on the summary provided by the Congressional Research Service, a public domain source.

The Foreign Cultural Exchange Jurisdictional Immunity Clarification Act would amend the federal judicial code with respect to denial of a foreign state's immunity from the jurisdiction of U.S. or state courts (under the Foreign Sovereign Immunities Act) in cases where rights in property taken in violation of international law are in issue and that property (or any property exchanged for it) is: (1) present in the United States in connection with a commercial activity carried on by the foreign state in the United States; or (2) owned by an agency or instrumentality of the foreign state, and that agency or instrumentality is engaged in a commercial activity in the United States.

The bill would prohibit consideration as a commercial activity (excluded from jurisdictional immunity) any activity in the United States of a foreign state, or of any carrier, associated with a temporary exhibition or display if: (1) the work of art (or other object of cultural significance) is imported into the United States from any foreign country pursuant to an agreement for its temporary exhibition or display between a foreign state that is its owner or custodian and the United States or cultural or educational institutions within it; and (2) the President has determined, with notice in the Federal Register, that such work is culturally significant and its temporary exhibition or display is in the national interest. (Thus, grants jurisdictional immunity to the foreign state and associated carrier for such works.)

The bill would deny application of this prohibition to cases concerning rights in property taken in violation of international law in which: (1) the action is based upon a claim that the work was taken between January 30, 1933, and May 8, 1945, by the government of Germany or any government in Europe occupied, assisted, or allied by the German government; (2) the court determines that the activity associated with the exhibition or display is commercial; and (3) that determination is necessary for the court to exercise jurisdiction over the foreign state.

== Congressional Budget Office report ==
This summary is based largely on the summary provided by the Congressional Budget Office, as ordered reported by the House Committee on the Judiciary on April 2, 2014. This is a public domain source.

Based on information provided by the Administrative Office of the United States Courts, the Congressional Budget Office (CBO) estimates that implementing H.R. 4292 would have no significant effect on the federal budget. Enacting H.R. 4292 would not affect direct spending or revenues; therefore, pay-as-you-go procedures do not apply.

Under current law, works of art loaned by foreign governments generally are immune to certain decisions made by federal courts and cannot be confiscated if the President, or the President’s designee, determines that display of the works is in the national interest. However, commercial activity in which foreign governments are engaged does not have immunity in federal courts. H.R. 4292 would clarify that importing works of art into the United States for temporary display is not a commercial activity, and thus that such works would be immune from seizure.

H.R. 4292 contains no intergovernmental or private-sector mandates as defined in the Unfunded Mandates Reform Act and would not affect the budgets of state, local, or tribal governments.

== Procedural history ==
The Foreign Cultural Exchange Jurisdictional Immunity Clarification Act was introduced into the United States House of Representatives on March 25, 2014 by Rep. Steve Chabot (R, OH-1). The bill was referred to the United States House Committee on the Judiciary and the United States House Judiciary Subcommittee on the Constitution and Civil Justice. The bill was scheduled to be voted on under suspension of the rules on May 6, 2014.

== Debate and discussion ==
According to a legislative digest provided by House Republicans, the bill "narrowly amends the Foreign Sovereign Immunities Act (FSIA) to make it easier for U.S. cultural and educational institutions to borrow art and other culturally significant objects from foreign countries." However, the changes made by the bill would not provide any immunity to art or objects that were "taken in violation of international law by Nazi Germany between January 30, 1933 and May 8, 1945."

In an editorial, Tess Davis of the University of Glasgow and Marc Masurovsky of the Holocaust Art Restitution Project, spoke out in opposition to the bill. Davis and Masurovsky argue that the bill would "prevent claimants from recovering their rightful property" and enable museums to "knowingly be able to exhibit stolen and looted art and antiquities." Davis and Masurovsky argue that the bill would weaken U.S. law and undermine the American tradition of honoring property rights.

== See also ==
- List of bills in the 113th United States Congress
- Looted art
- Art theft
