= Missouri v. China =

2024 United States Court of Appeals case

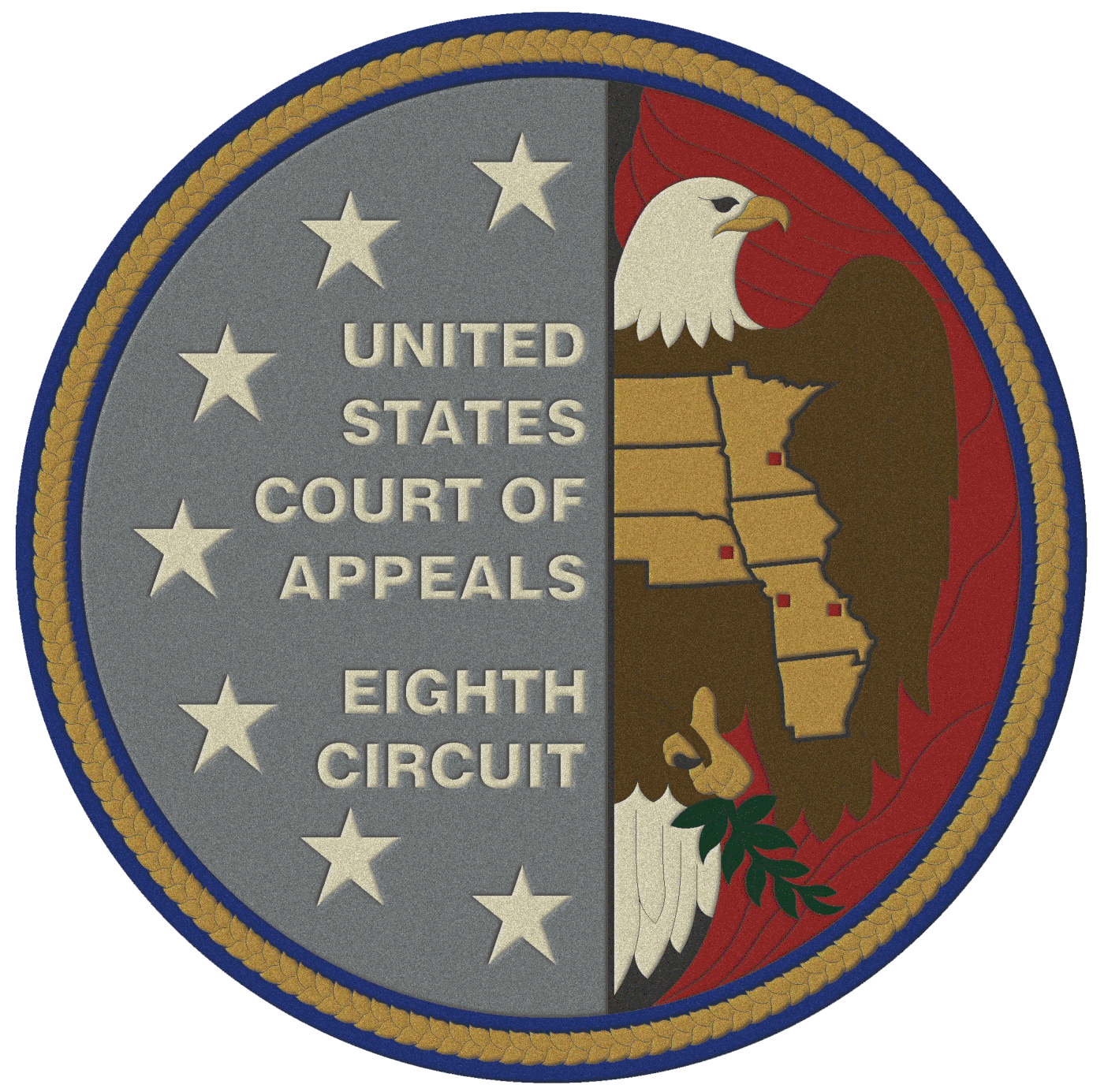
- Court: United States Court of Appeals for the Eighth Circuit
- Full case name: State of Missouri, ex rel. Andrew Bailey, in his official capacity as Missouri Attorney General v. The People's Republic of China; Communist Party of China; National Health Commission of the People's Republic of China; Ministry of Emergency Management of the People's Republic of China; Ministry of Civil Affairs of the People's Republic of China; People's Government of the Hubei Province; People's Government of Wuhan City; Wuhan Institute of Virology; Chinese Academy of Sciences
- Decided: January 10 2024
- Citation: No. 22-2495

Case history
- Prior history: Appeal from E.D. Mo.

Holding
- Missouri's allegation that China hoarded personal protective equipment while the rest of the world was unaware of the extent of the COVID-19 virus fell under the "commercial activity" exception of the Foreign Sovereign Immunities Act, as it involved alleged anti-competitive behavior that had a direct effect in the United States.

Court membership
- Judges sitting: Lavenski Smith, David Stras, Jonathan A. Kobes

Case opinions
- Majority: David Stras, joined by Jonathan A. Kobes
- Concur/dissent: Lavenski Smith

Laws applied
- Foreign Sovereign Immunities Act

Missouri v. China, No. 22-2495 (2024), was a United States Court of Appeals for the Eighth Circuit case in which the court held that Missouri's allegation that China hoarded personal protective equipment (PPE) fell under the commercial activity exception of the Foreign Sovereign Immunities Act (FSIA). The court remanded the case to the district court for further proceedings. In March 2025, the district court entered a default judgment and awarded Missouri over $24 billion in damages.

== Background ==
In April 2020, the State of Missouri filed a lawsuit against the People's Republic of China (PRC), the Chinese Communist Party (CCP), China's National Health Commission, China's Ministry of Emergency Management, China's Ministry of Civil Affairs, the Hubei provincial government, the Wuhan municipal government, Wuhan Institute of Virology, and the Chinese Academy of Sciences.

In its complaint, Missouri alleged the defendants of negligence in handling the COVID-19 pandemic, arguing they allowed the virus to spread globally, attempted to prevent other countries from learning about it, and hoarded PPE.

The defendants did not respond to the lawsuit. In July 2022, the United States District Court for the Eastern District of Missouri dismissed the case, ruling that all defendants were presumptively entitled to immunity. The court found that Missouri failed to demonstrate that the case fell within any FSIA exceptions under 28 U.S. Code § 1605.

Missouri appealed.

== Opinion of the court ==
In January 2024, the U.S. Court of Appeals for the Eighth Circuit reversed the dismissal of the hoarding claim.

Judge David Stras wrote the majority opinion. The court ruled that the Chinese defendants, including the Wuhan Institute of Virology and the Chinese Academy of Sciences, were entitled to immunity under the FSIA. The court also upheld immunity for the Chinese Communist Party, citing Missouri's own claim that the CCP controls China's government.

In applying the commercial activity exception to immunity, the court rejected most of Missouri's claims, finding China's actions did not cause the "direct" effects in the U.S. required under FSIA. However, the court ruled that the PPE-hoarding claim fell within the commercial activity exception, as China's purchase and stockpiling of PPE led to shortages and higher prices in the U.S., directly affecting Missouri's healthcare system and economy.

The court remanded the case to the district court for further proceedings.

Chief Judge Lavenski Smith dissented in part, arguing the effects of PPE hoarding were not immediate enough to qualify under the FSIA exception.

== Subsequent developments ==
In March 2025, the district court ruled that Missouri "has established this claim of damages through evidence satisfactory to the court" and issued a default judgment against the defendants, awarding Missouri over $24 billion in damages. In August 2026, two defendants, the Hubei provincial government and the Chinese Academy of Sciences, filed a motion asking the district court to set aside the default judgment and dismiss the lawsuit.

Legal commentators raised concerns about whether the defendants were properly served, noting that Missouri did not use Hague Service Convention procedures required for serving foreign sovereign entities. Some argued that improper service could render the default judgment invalid. Professor William Dodge also warned that sovereign immunity from enforcement is broader than immunity from suit, meaning Missouri may ultimately be unable to collect on the judgment due to protections over China's sovereign assets.

In a similar lawsuit filed by the Mississippi Attorney General, the U.S. District Court for the Southern District of Mississippi entered a default judgment in May 2025. The Chinese government subsequently sued Missouri in the Intermediate People's Court of Wuhan, seeking compensation equivalent to $50.5 billion.

== See also ==
- Sovereign immunity
- Sovereign immunity in the United States
- COVID-19 litigation involving China
- Transnational lawfare by China
- China v. Missouri, a counterclaim case in Chinese courts by the defendants in this case
