= Federal Republic of Germany v. Philipp =

Germany v. Philipp
- Supreme Court of the United States

Argued December 7, 2020 Decided February 3, 2021
- Full case name: Federal Republic of Germany et al. v. Philipp et al.
- Docket no.: 19-351
- Citations: 592 U.S. 169 (more)
- Argument: Oral argument

Holding
- The FSIA does not allow Holocaust survivors to sue Germany in U.S. court for the return of items stolen during that genocide, as the sale was an act of expropriation of property rather than an act of genocide.

Court membership
- Chief Justice John Roberts Associate Justices Clarence Thomas · Stephen Breyer; Samuel Alito · Sonia Sotomayor; Elena Kagan · Neil Gorsuch; Brett Kavanaugh · Amy Coney Barrett

Case opinion
- Majority: Roberts, joined by unanimous

Laws applied
- Foreign Sovereign Immunities Act

Federal Republic of Germany v. Philipp, 592 U.S. 169 (2021), was a United States Supreme Court case that dealt with the applicability of the Foreign Sovereign Immunities Act (FSIA) for heirs of victims of the Holocaust to sue Germany in the United States court systems for compensation for items that were taken by the Nazi Party during World War II. At issue in the case was whether claims fell within the FSIA's exception to sovereign immunity for "property taken in violation of international law", 28 U.S.C. §1605(a)(3), given that the sovereign here was alleged to have engaged in a taking of its own nationals' property; and whether courts can invoke the doctrine of international comity under the FSIA to abstain from exercising jurisdiction based on prudential considerations. In a unanimous opinion by Chief Justice Roberts, the Court held that FSIA does not allow these survivors to sue Germany in U.S. court, as the sale was an act of expropriation of property rather than an act of genocide, though other means of recovery are still potentially available.

The decision also resolved a related case, Republic of Hungary v. Simon, which examined the application of the doctrines of international comity and forum non conveniens for expropriation exception cases brought under the FSIA. The Court decided the case per curiam based on the ruling of Germany v. Philipp on February 3, 2021.

== Background ==
During World War II, the Nazi Party imprisoned numerous people, including a large number of Jewish people, and stripped them of their possessions. In other cases, the Nazi rule forced these people to sell their possessions at significantly reduced prices. At the center of the current case is the Guelph Treasure with an estimated value of US$250 million in 2020. The items were purchased by a consortium of Jewish art dealers prior to the war, but they were then forced to sell the collection at a third of its value in 1935 to agents of Hermann Göring. After the war, the Guelph Treasure pieces were moved to the Kunstgewerbemuseum Berlin (Museum of Decorative Arts) which is overseen by the Federal Republic of Germany under the Prussian Cultural Heritage Foundation, where they have remained as part of the exhibits.

Heirs of the Jewish art dealers began seeking means to recover the collection from Germany around 2008, first seeking action within Germany itself. They argued that any post-1933 sale should be treated as an act of coercion and thus considered invalid, but Germany ruled that the dealers sold the collection voluntarily and were compensated fairly, and thus the collection was acquired legitimately. The heirs turned to United States courts to sue Germany under the Foreign Sovereign Immunities Act (FSIA), which normally gives immunities to foreign countries except in certain situations. The heirs claimed that the FSIA allowed for countries to be sued for violations of "rights in property taken in violation of international law", of which the acts of genocide that the Nazi Party performed during World War II would qualify.

The heirs brought suit against Germany and the Prussian Cultural Heritage Foundation to the United States District Court for the District of Columbia, seeking the value of the collection in compensation in exchange for letting Germany retain the collection. Germany moved to dismiss the case, claiming that the FSIA clause related to "rights in property" did not apply to the sale since there was no involvement of a foreign state at the time. The district court denied Germany's motion to dismiss. Germany appealed this to the United States Court of Appeals for the District of Columbia Circuit, which upheld the District Court's refusal to dismiss. Subsequently, Germany filed a petition to the Supreme Court to rule on the applicability of FSIA to the case. The Court certified the case in July 2020.

== Supreme Court ==
Oral hearings for the case were held on December 7, 2020, alongside those of Hungary v. Simon, a related case involving the use of FSIA to compensate heirs to Polish victims of the Holocaust whose possessions were stolen while they were transported to concentration camps. Observers to the oral hearings said that the Justices were wary of placing the United States court system in the middle of foreign affairs, a matter better resolved by the State Department.

The Supreme Court ruled in both cases on February 3, 2021. Chief Justice John Roberts delivered the unanimous opinion of the court for Germany vacating the lower court rulings and remanding the case for further consideration. The court determined that the heirs did not qualify for the "rights in property" allowance under the FSIA, which is reserved for the taking of property from one state by another, and not between a foreign state and individuals. Roberts' opinion believed that they needed to consider the original sale of the art under act of expropriation rather than genocide in determining if FSIA applied. Roberts also relied on an international case law from Jurisdictional Immunities of the State heard by the International Court of Justice, a rarity for the Supreme Court, while had determined for Germany that "a state is not deprived of immunity by reason of the fact that it is accused of serious violations of international human rights law." Roberts wrote that by taking the heirs' position, they would undermine other provisions of FSIA that Congress had explicitly included, and open the United States itself to claims from other foreign courts. Roberts stated in his opinion that there may be other means through which the heirs could seek legal redress from Germany in the United States court systems beyond FSIA, which should be explored with the remanded case.

In Hungary v. Simon, the court issued a per curiam order based on the Germany decision to remand its case back to lower courts for further review.
