= Jam v. International Finance Corp. =

2019 United States Supreme Court opinion

- Supreme Court of the United States

Argued October 31, 2018 Decided February 27, 2019
- Full case name: Jam et al. v. International Finance Corp.
- Docket no.: 17-1011
- Citations: 586 U.S. ___ (more) 139 S. Ct. 759; 203 L. Ed. 2d 53
- Argument: Oral argument

Case history
- Prior: Motion to dismiss granted, Jam v. Int'l Fin. Corp., 172 F. Supp. 3d 104 (D.D.C. 2016); Affirmed, 860 F.3d 703 (D.C. Cir. 2017); Cert. granted, Jam v. Int'l Fin. Corp., 138 S. Ct. 2026 (2018)
- Subsequent: Remanded, 760 F. App'x 11 (D.C. Cir. 2019)

Holding
- The International Organizations Immunities Act grants international organizations the same immunity from suit that foreign governments have under the Foreign Sovereign Immunities Act.

Court membership
- Chief Justice John Roberts Associate Justices Clarence Thomas · Ruth Bader Ginsburg; Stephen Breyer · Samuel Alito; Sonia Sotomayor · Elena Kagan; Neil Gorsuch · Brett Kavanaugh

Case opinions
- Majority: Roberts, joined by Thomas, Ginsburg, Alito, Sotomayor, Kagan, Gorsuch
- Dissent: Breyer
- Kavanaugh took no part in the consideration or decision of the case.

Laws applied
- International Organizations Immunities Act, Foreign Sovereign Immunities Act

Jam v. International Finance Corp., 586 U.S. ___ (2019), was a United States Supreme Court case from the October 2018 term. The Supreme Court ruled that international organizations, such as the World Bank Group's financing arm, the International Finance Corporation, can be sued in US federal courts for conduct arising from their commercial activities. It specifically held that international organizations shared the same sovereign immunity as foreign governments. This was a reversal from existing jurisprudence, which held that international organizations (unlike foreign governments) had near-absolute immunity from lawsuits under the Foreign Sovereign Immunities Act and the International Organizations Immunities Act.

This case is notable because for the first time the Court established that US-based international organizations, such as the World Bank and the Inter-American Development Bank, could be sued if their overseas investment activities caused harm in local communities. It overturned a decades-old standard established in the aftermath of World War II when newly-formed international agencies were first being established with headquarters in the United States.

== Background ==
The World Bank Group, headquartered in Washington, DC is a group of international organizations that finances infrastructure projects, mostly in developing countries. The International Finance Corporation (IFC), is the arm of the World Bank Group that specializes in lending to private sector investments and business interests in developing countries, whereas the International Bank for Reconstruction and Development and the International Development Association (together known as the World Bank) mainly lends to middle-income and lower-income governments for projects, rather than business entities.

In the 2000s, the IFC provided US$450 million to Coastal Gujarat Power Ltd. to fund the construction of the Tata Mundra power plant in Gujarat, a coastal state in western India. As part of the lending agreement (the IFC's Performance Standards on Environmental and Social Sustainability), the IFC requires loan recipients, including the power plant, to adhere to stringent human rights safeguards and environmental protections. The agreement allowed the IFC to revoke financial support for the plant if the plant failed to adhere to these requirements.

However, the plant, which opened in 2012, emitted pollution which drained into local waterways and farmland, damaging the environment and creating hardship for local fishermen in the Kutch district. An internal audit conducted by the IFC's social responsibility division found that the IFC failed to provide appropriate levels of oversight. Local fishing and farming communities, with the aid of a not-for-profit group called EarthRights International and Stanford Law School, filed suit against the IFC in United States District Court, alleging breach of contract as well as the torts of nuisance and trespass.

== In lower courts ==
Since the IFC's headquarters were in Washington, DC, the plaintiffs filed suit in the United States District Court for the District of Columbia in 2015, relying heavily on the IFC internal audit report as evidence. The IFC successfully moved to dismiss the case, citing absolute sovereign immunity granted to international organizations under the International Organizations Immunities Act (IOIA) in 1945. The IOIA stated in part that international organizations "shall enjoy the same immunity from suit and every form of judicial process as is enjoyed by foreign governments". In 1945, when the IOIA was enacted, the sovereign immunity enjoyed by foreign governments was nearly absolute.

However, starting in the 1950s, the State Department began to adopt a narrower view of foreign sovereign immunity. Under this new interpretation, foreign governments would continue to enjoy nearly absolute immunity for acts conducted in their capacity as national governments. However, they could be sued in federal court for actions taken when acting as private commercial entities. This more-restrictive view of sovereign immunity, including the waiver of immunity for commercial activities, was eventually codified by Congress into the Foreign Sovereign Immunities Act (FSIA) of 1972.

The IFC successfully argued that international organizations should retain the more expansive version of sovereign immunity that was standard when the IOIA was enacted in 1945, not the more restrictive view that was adopted starting in the 1950s. The plaintiffs appealed the District Court's ruling to the DC Circuit Court of Appeals, which upheld the opinion of the District Court. The plaintiffs finally appealed to the United States Supreme Court, which granted a writ of certiorari agreeing to hear the case in May 2017. Stanford law professor Jeffrey L. Fisher argued the case on behalf of the plaintiffs. Donald Verrilli, the former US Solicitor General (2011–2016), argued the case on behalf of the IFC.

== Supreme Court opinion ==
Justice Brett Kavanaugh, who was formerly on the DC Circuit Court which heard the case originally, recused himself and did not participate in the consideration of this case.

In a 7–1 decision authored by Chief Justice John Roberts, the Supreme Court reversed the Circuit Court's opinion. According to the Supreme Court, the most natural reading of the IOIA was that Congress intended to permanently tie the sovereign immunity enjoyed by international organizations and the immunity enjoyed by foreign governments. When Congress established the exception for commercial activities in the Foreign Sovereign Immunities Act of 1972, that exception was 'inherited' by international organizations, who (in the language of the IOIA), "enjoy the same immunity from suit […] as foreign governments". Moreover, the Chief Justice refused to adopt a purpose-focused analysis that would have distinguished between the granting of immunity to states based on principles of comity and reciprocity, compared to international organizational immunity based on the need to carry out their functions without undue interference. In his decision, Roberts also noted that the IOIA only establishes a default set of rules and that international organizations may, in their charters, specify that they have absolute immunity from lawsuits and that the International Finance Corporation's charter did not include such a clause.

In a dissent, Justice Stephen Breyer stated that Congress's purpose in enacting the IOIA was to confer the same type of immunity to international organizations that foreign governments enjoyed in 1945, when the statute was first enacted. He also encourages a "purpose-based" interpretation framework for the statute, noting that in 1945 Congress was attempting to create a safe harbor for newly created multilateral organizations, including the United Nations (UN), the International Monetary Fund (IMF), and the World Bank, and that the founding charters of these organizations required member states to grant them broad immunity from suit.

As a result of the Supreme Court's ruling, the case was remanded to the lower courts for further proceedings.
