= National Defense Authorization Act for Fiscal Year 2008 =

- Long title: An Act To provide for the enactment of the National Defense Authorization Act for Fiscal Year 2008, as previously enrolled, with certain modifications to address the foreign sovereign immunities provisions of title 28, United States Code, with respect to the attachment of property in certain judgments against Iraq, the lapse of statutory authorities for the payment of bonuses, special pays, and similar benefits for members of the uniformed services, and for other purposes.
- Acronyms (colloquial): NDAA 2008
- Enacted by: the 110th United States Congress

Citations
- Public law: Pub. L. 110–181 (text) (PDF)

Legislative history
- Introduced in the House as H.R. 4986 by Ike Skelton (R‑MO 4th) on January 16, 2008; Passed the House on January 16, 2008 (369-46); Passed the Senate on January 22, 2008 (91-3); Signed into law by President George W. Bush on January 28, 2008; 18 years ago

The National Defense Authorization Act for Fiscal Year 2008 is a law in the United States signed by President George W. Bush on January 28, 2008. As a bill it was H.R. 4986 in the 110th Congress. The overall purpose of the law is to authorize funding for the defense of the United States and its interests abroad, for military construction, and for national security-related energy programs. In a controversial signing statement, President Bush instructed the executive branch to construe Sections 841, 846, 1079, and 1222 "in a manner consistent with the constitutional authority of the President".

== Section 841 ==
Establishes a Commission on Wartime Contracting in Iraq and Afghanistan. This commission would study federal agency contracting for reconstruction, the logistical support of coalition forces, and the performance of security functions in Iraq and Afghanistan. Some of the most important duties of this commission would be to assess the extent of potential violations of laws of war, Federal law, or other legal precedents as well as assess the extent of waste, fraud, and abuse under federal contracts. These provisions could be the basis for bringing criminal or civil charges against agencies under the executive branch.

== Section 846 ==
Provides protection for contractor employees who wish to disclose wrongdoing to a member of the United States Congress or a Congressional committee member.

== Section 904 ==
Outlined under "Title IX - Department of Defense Organization and Management", section 904 deals with the "Management of the Department of Defense". The section defines the requirement "for improving and evaluating the overall efficiency and effectiveness of the business operations of the Department of Defense and achieving an integrated management system for business support areas within the Department of Defense".

== Section 1079 ==
Directly deals with communications with the committee on Armed Forces in the U.S. Senate and U.S. House of Representatives, in which either the Senate or House could request an intelligence assessment, report, estimate, or legal opinion from the director of a national intelligence center. The section accounts for the possibility of the President invoking executive privilege, and contains a sub-section demanding the White House Counsel prepare a legitimate reason for invoking privilege.

== Section 1222 ==
Limits spending and funding for certain purposes relating to Iraq, "(1) To establish any military installation or base for the purpose of providing for the permanent stationing of United States Armed Forces in Iraq. (2) To exercise United States control of the oil resources of Iraq."

== Section 1822 ==
Section 1822 requires the President to "establish a bipartisan Council of Governors to advise the Secretary of Defense, the Secretary of Homeland Security, and the White House Homeland Security Council on matters related to the National Guard and civil support missions".

== State immunity exceptions ==
The 2004 decision of Cicippio-Puleo v. Islamic Republic of Iran, which the DC Circuit Court ruled that foreign countries known to be supports of state-sponsored terrorism could not be sued for private cause of action under the current Foreign Sovereign Immunities Act of 1976, even with the Flatow Amendment, affected numerous other terrorism-related lawsuits in the court system at the time. Within the NDAA 2008, Congress expanded exceptions to the state immunity protections granted by the Foreign Sovereign Immunities Act. Exceptions were added for torture, extrajudicial killing, aircraft sabotage, and hostage-taking, and specifically making foreign countries that backed state-sponsored terrorism liable for the actions of its officials and agents which may be involved in such state-sponsorship.

== Signing statement ==
In signing the law, the Bush administration continued its use of the signing statement to object to parts of laws it viewed as conflicting with what it alleged are the constitutional powers of the unitary executive, especially as they related to national defense and the war in Iraq. The following Sections of the law referenced in the signing statement are listed, along with the possible impact of being mentioned in the signing statement:

- Section 841: May reduce oversight of contractual abuse in Iraq and Afghanistan.
- Section 846: Possibly limits protection to contractor employees when disclosing improper actions of the employer.
- Section 1079: Could limit how much intelligence information Congress can demand from intelligence officials.
- Section 1222: May limit Congressional oversight in the permanent establishment of U.S. military bases or the use of government funds to control oil resources in Iraq.

== See also ==
- National Defense Authorization Act
