= Par in parem non habet imperium =

Principle in international law

Par in parem non habet imperium (Latin for 'equals have no sovereignty over each other') is a general principle of international law, forming the basis of state immunity. Because of this principle, a sovereign state cannot exercise jurisdiction over another sovereign state.
