= Saudi Arabia v. Nelson =

- Supreme Court of the United States

Argued November 30, 1992 Decided March 23, 1993
- Full case name: Saudi Arabia, King Faisal Specialist Hospital and Royspec, Petitioners v. Scott Nelson, et ux.
- Citations: 507 U.S. 349 (more) 113 S. Ct. 1471; 123 L. Ed. 2d 47; 1993 U.S. LEXIS 2398; 61 U.S.L.W. 4253; 93 Cal. Daily Op. Service 2039; 93 Daily Journal DAR 3620; 93 Daily Journal DAR 3772; 7 Fla. L. Weekly Fed. S 90

Holding
- The wrongful injury claim brought by Mr. and Mrs. Nelson was not "based upon a commercial activity" according to the Foreign Sovereign Immunities Act of 1976 (Sec. 1605(a)(2). The Court of Appeals judgment was thereby reversed.

Court membership
- Chief Justice William Rehnquist Associate Justices Byron White · Harry Blackmun; John P. Stevens · Sandra Day O'Connor; Antonin Scalia · Anthony Kennedy; David Souter · Clarence Thomas

Case opinions
- Majority: Souter, joined by Rehnquist, O'Connor, Scalia, Thomas; Kennedy (except last paragraph of part II)
- Concurrence: White, joined by Blackmun
- Concur/dissent: Kennedy, joined by Blackmun, Stevens (parts I-B and II)
- Concur/dissent: Blackmun
- Dissent: Stevens

Laws applied
- Foreign Sovereign Immunities Act

Saudi Arabia v. Nelson, 507 U.S. 349 (1993), is a United States Supreme Court case in which the Court considered the term "based upon a commercial activity" within the meaning of the first clause of 1605(a)(2) of the Foreign Sovereign Immunities Act of 1976.

== Background ==
A U.S. citizen Nelson filed suit against Saudi Arabia for alleged abuse and torture suffered while under arrest in Saudi Arabia.

A married couple of United States citizenry filed a tort action against the Kingdom of Saudi Arabia, King Faisal Specialist Hospital in Riyadh owned by the Saudi government, and the hospital's corporate agent in the US, Royspec Purchasing Services. The tort claim against these three entities collectively referred to as the Saudi government alleged that Mr. Nelson, a hospital engineer in Riyadh, was subjected to illicit incarceration, routine torture spanning a four-day period, and failure to admonish him as to the potential risks incurred by whistle-blowing. Based on the Saudi government's alleged wrongful actions, Mr. Nelson believed the US Foreign Sovereign Immunities Act of 1976 (FSIA) authorized the court jurisdiction to hear the case.

The Hospital Corporation of America, Ltd. (HCA), a career recruiting firm based in the US, placed ads in various media outlets for the position of monitoring systems engineer at the King Faisal Specialist Hospital in Riyadh. Mr. Nelson interviewed for the job in Riyadh, Saudi Arabia, and later entered into an employment contract with the hospital through HCA. Mr. Nelson's family was informed Royspec Purchasing Services, based in the US, was the designated agent through which to contact Mr. Nelson in an emergency.

Mr. Nelson began his new job in December 1983, which entailed monitoring "facilities, equipment, utilities, and maintenance systems to ensure the safety of patients, hospital staff, and others" (Saudi Arabia v. Nelson). Shortly after employment began he discovered numerous safety violations and defects throughout the hospital, of which he promptly informed his superiors and a Saudi government commission of the infractions. He was asked to ignore the problems by the hospital, but he persisted.

On September 27, 1984, Mr. Nelson was detained and subsequently tortured until signing a coerced statement, which was in Arabic, a language he did not understand. Two days later he was imprisoned at Al Penitentiary without being charged with a crime. Mr. Nelson's wife was informed of her husband's whereabouts several days later but could not condition a release. On November 5, 1984, Mr. Nelson was released from prison through the plea of a US senator and left the country shortly thereafter through the permission of the Saudi Government. Mr. Nelson's employment contract was shortly terminated thereafter.

The plaintiff, Mr. Nelson, asserted the defendant, Saudi Arabia, was not immune to prosecution under the FSIA, which enumerates exceptions of which any must exist in order to deny a foreign state's sovereign immunity. The list of exceptions refer to a state's conduct only. A state is denied sovereign foreign immunity if the state's conduct is private, not public; private, not sovereign; commercial, not non-commercial; or trade-related, not political (Slomanson, 100). Specifically, the commercial activity immunity exception was used by Mr. Nelson. The plaintiff asserted job recruitment, contract of employment, and employment itself constituted the commercial activity that led to and associates the wrongful injury claim with the Saudi Government's commercial activity. Therefore, the plaintiff claims that the process of recruiting, hiring, and subsequent employment led to or indirectly are associated with his tortious injuries.

This case was first heard by a federal trial court that dismissed the case for lack of subject-matter jurisdiction because the FSIA did not define commercial activity as imprisonment and torture. The case traveled to an appellate court, which held recruiting, hiring, and employing all entailed commercial activities that led to the wrongful injury, thus establishing jurisdiction to hear the case under FSIA. The appellate court overturned the district court's dismissal, but the Supreme Court reached the final, conclusive ruling.

== Opinion of the Court ==
The Court's majority opinion, delivered by Justice Souter, held that the wrongful injury claim brought by Mr. and Mrs. Nelson was not "based upon a commercial activity" according to the Foreign Sovereign Immunities Act of 1976 (section 1605(a)(2)). The Court of Appeals judgment was thereby reversed, thus restoring the trial courts dismissal based upon a "lack of subject-matter jurisdiction".

The court reasoned that the tortious acts of the defendant were not "based upon a commercial activity", therefore not in violation of the Foreign Sovereign Immunities Act of 1976. The defendant's conduct, however heinous, could not be classified as being "based upon a commercial activity". The tortious conduct rather is a gross abuse of state police power, which is an act only performed by sovereign states. Only States perform acts such as unlawful detention of private citizens, torture, conduct foreign engagements, and diplomatic relations. Private citizens cannot participate in acts of state.

=== Concurrences ===
Justice White and Justice Blackmun concurred with Justice Souter's majority opinion, with one caveat. The justices disagreed that the defendant's tortious conduct was not "based upon a commercial activity", but nonetheless concurred with the majority judgment because the commercial acts did not occur in the US.

=== Dissents ===
Justice Kennedy believed the wrongful acts perpetrated by the defendant did constitute commercial activity. Under FSIA, the Saudi Government's operation of the hospital, employment practices, and disciplinary procedures were "based upon commercial activity" and therefore the plaintiff proved the court did have jurisdiction.

Additionally, unlike Justice White, he believed the defendant's commercial activities did have adequate contact within the United States to fulfill an immunity exception under the FSIA.

== See also ==
- List of United States Supreme Court cases
- List of United States Supreme Court cases, volume 507
- List of United States Supreme Court cases by the Rehnquist Court
