= Cicippio-Puleo v. Islamic Republic of Iran =

2004 US federal appeals court case

- Court: United States Court of Appeals for the District of Columbia Circuit
- Full case name: Elizabeth A. Cicippio-Puleo, et al. v. Islamic Republic of Iran and Iranian Ministry of Information and Security
- Argued: December 15 2003
- Decided: January 16 2004

Holding
- §1605(a)(7) of the Foreign Sovereign Immunities Act abrogates foreign sovereign immunity and provides jurisdiction in specified circumstances, but it does not create a private cause of action.

Court membership
- Judges sitting: Harry T. Edwards, A. Raymond Randolph, Merrick Garland

Case opinions
- Majority: Edwards, joined by Randolph, Garland

Laws applied
- Foreign Sovereign Immunities Act

Cicippio-Puleo v. Islamic Republic of Iran (353 F.3d 1024) was a 2004 case in the United States Court of Appeals for the District of Columbia Circuit related to the Foreign Sovereign Immunities Act (FSIA). The DC Circuit Court ruled that while 1996 amendments in FSIA made exceptions from sovereign immunity for states known for supporting state-sponsored terrorism, as listed by the State Department, foreign nations were still immune from private cause of action, preventing lawsuits from private individuals levied at the state based on such terrorism. As a result of this ruling, Congress significantly amended FSIA in 2008 to greatly expand the exceptions from sovereign immunity for state-sponsored terrorism and specifically allowing for causes of actions against foreign countries.

== Background ==
The Foreign Sovereign Immunities Act (FSIA) was passed in 1976 and generally grants foreign countries sovereign immunity from lawsuits from private American individuals with limited exceptions. Those exceptions were expanded with the passage of the Antiterrorism and Effective Death Penalty Act of 1996 and the Flatow Amendment to exempt countries that supported state-sponsored terrorism from immunity. The State Department maintains the list of countries that it has determined to support terrorism.

The present case was initiated by Joe Cicippio, one of the hostages taken during the Lebanon hostage crisis by Hezbollah and held from 1986 to 1991. Iran had been determined by the State Department to have been financially backing Hezbollah at the time. Cicippio sued Iran in 1996 under terms of both FSIA and the Flatow Amendment, and as Iran did not send any counsel to defend themselves, the trial was held ex parte for Iran. The court ruled in Cicippio's favor, awarding him US$30 million in compensatory damages alongside similar awards for other hostages and their families that had joined the suit.

== Case ==
In 2001, Cicippio's children brought an additional suit against Iran, seeking punitive damages for emotional distress and loss of solatium during the hostage period of Cicippio under FSIA and the Flatow Amendment. Cicippio sought to consolidate his children's to his completed case, and subsequently seek summary judgement based on the prior ruling. In 2002 the United States District Court for the District of Columbia denied the motion for summary judgement, as well as consolidation, but further also dismissed the children's case as lacking standing, in that FSIA nor the Flatow Amendment does not create a private cause of action for cases of punitive damages.

Cicippio's children appealed to the DC Circuit Court, which in 2004 upheld the District Court's ruling. In the 3-0 ruling written by Judge Harry T. Edwards, the court found that the Flatow Amendment "merely waives the immunity of a foreign state without creating a cause of action against it, and the Flatow Amendment only provides a private right of action against officials, employees, and agents of a foreign state, not against the foreign state itself". Further, the decision, though upholding the Flatow Amendment as the right direction for victims of terrorism to gain compensation, stated "it is for Congress, not the courts, to decide whether a cause of action should lie against foreign states."

== Impact ==
With numerous cases related to FSIA in the courts at the time, the DC Circuit's decision in Cicippio-Puleo filtered into other Circuit courts with civil FSIA cases that has been filed on wake of the Flatow Amendment. The other Circuit Courts adopted the DC Circuit's rational from Cicippio-Puleo, making it difficult for several of these cases to go forward.

Congress took action to remedy this in passage of the National Defense Authorization Act for Fiscal Year 2008, passed in January 2008, which among its budgetary features, specifically enhanced the terrorism exemptions of FSIA, addressing the ability for private cause of action cases to be taken against foreign countries that supported state-sponsored terrorism, and made such changes apply retroactive to any ongoing lawsuit that had been adversely affected by the decision of Cicippio-Puleo.
