= Flatow Amendment =

United States law relating to terrorism

The Flatow Amendment is an amendment to the Foreign Sovereign Immunities Act of 1976 passed in 1996, which allows American victims of terrorism to sue countries that are designated as terrorism sponsors. The legislation establishes that foreign state sponsors of terrorism "shall be liable to a United States national … for personal injury or death caused by acts of that [party]…."

It is named after Stephen Flatow, whose daughter Alisa Flatow was killed in a suicide bombing attack carried out by militants belonging to the Islamic Jihad Movement in Palestine in 1995. After her death, Flatow commenced a series of lawsuits against the Iranian government.

US Courts are thus authorized to award money damages to said victims. The executive branch, however, has often resisted paying these judgments from frozen terrorist state assets by arguing that it would hamper presidential ability to conduct foreign affairs.
