= Kfar Darom bus attack =

1995 suicide attack in Palestine

- The attack site
- Location: 31°24′13″N 34°21′19″E; Vicinity of Kfar Darom, Gaza Strip
- Date: 9 April 1995; 31 years ago 11:45 am (GMT+2)
- Attack type: Suicide attack
- Deaths: 7 Israeli soldiers 1 civilian (+1 attacker)
- Injuries: 52
- Perpetrator: Islamic Jihad
- Assailant: Khalid Mohammed Khatib

The Kfar Darom bus attack was a 1995 suicide attack on an Israeli bus carrying civilians and soldiers to Kfar Darom, an Israeli settlement in the Gaza Strip. The attack killed seven Israeli soldiers and one American civilian. The Shaqaqi faction of the Islamic Jihad claimed responsibility for the bombing. A United States Federal district judge ruled that the Iranian Government had provided financial aid to the group that carried out the attack and were therefore responsible for the murder of the U.S. citizen. The court ordered the Government of Iran to pay the victim's family $247.5 million in damages.

== The attack ==
On the morning of 9 April 1995, Khaled Mohammed Khatib, a construction worker from the Nuseirat refugee camp, waited on the main highway running from Ashkelon to the settlements in the Gaza Strip. At 11:45 am, he rammed Egged bus 36 carrying more than 60 Israeli soldiers and civilian passengers to the Jewish settlement of Kfar Darom. At the moment he rammed the bus, he flipped a trigger switch in the steering column, detonating a bomb in his car. Seven Israeli soldiers and one American civilian (named Alisa Flatow) were killed and 52 passengers were wounded. The family donated Alisa Flatow's organs.

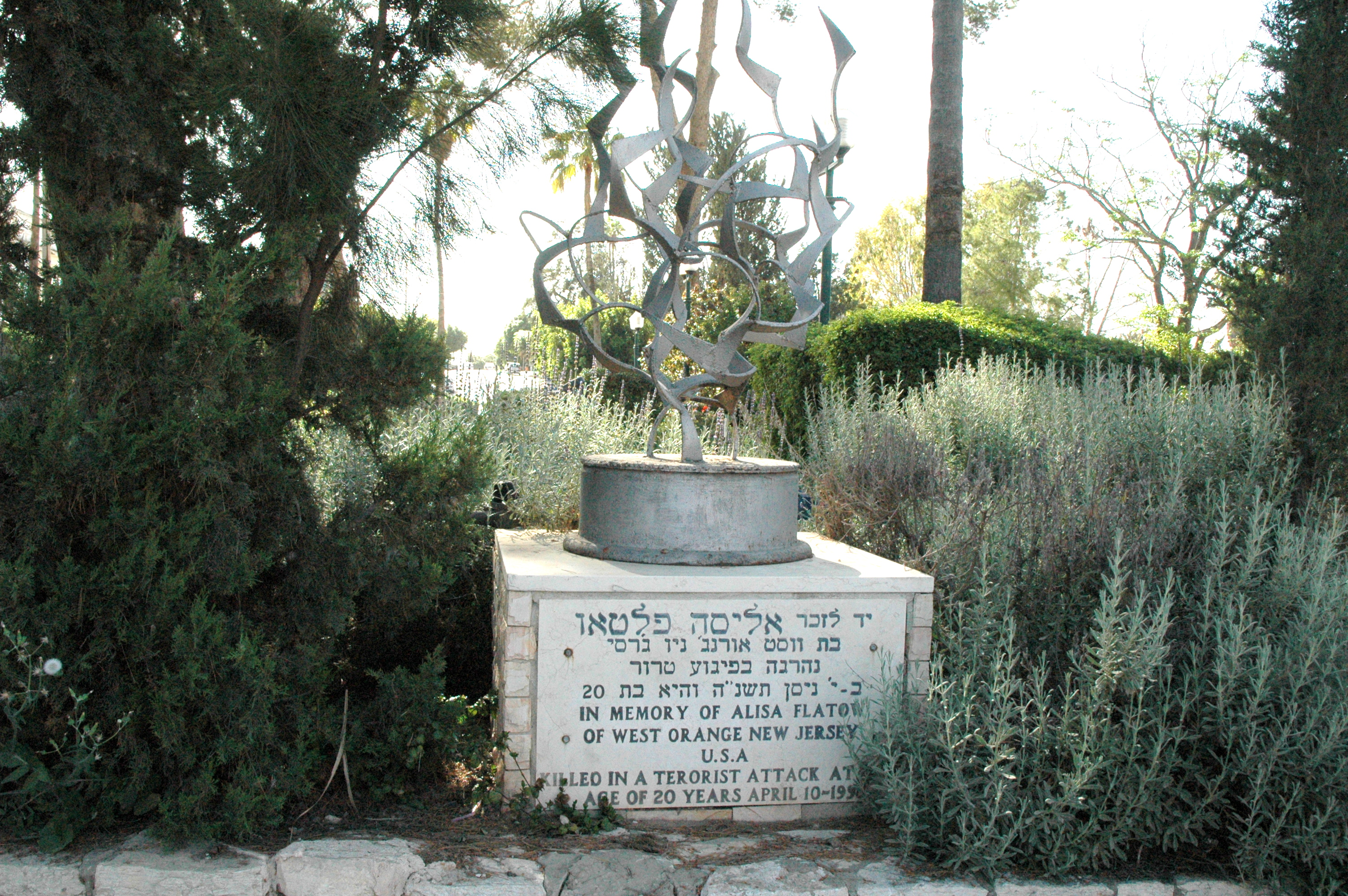
Alisa Flatow memorial in Gedera, Israel commemorating 20-year old victim of Kfar Darom attack

== Subsequent attack ==
Two hours later, Imad Abu Amouna used a suicide car-bomb against an Israeli police-escorted convoy of cars driving towards the Netzarim settlement. Imad Abu Amouna was a Palestinian Islamic Jihad militant who had grown tired of waiting for his "martyrdom operation" and instead volunteered with Hamas. Nobody was killed, but thirty soldiers were wounded. The bomb used by Amouna was designed by Yahya Ayyash.

== Lawsuit ==
The family of the American citizen killed in the attack sued the government of Iran, and in 1998 a Federal district judge ordered the Iranian government to pay $247.5 million in damages to the family.

== See also ==
- Palestinian political violence
