= Foreign Sovereign Immunities Act =

1976 United States federal law

- Long title: An Act to define the jurisdiction of United States courts in suits against foreign states, the circumstances in which foreign states are immune from suit and in which execution may not be levied on their property, and for other purposes.
- Acronyms (colloquial): FSIA
- Enacted by: the 94th United States Congress
- Effective: January 19, 1977

Citations
- Public law: 94-583
- Statutes at Large: 90 Stat. 2891

Codification
- Titles amended: 28
- U.S.C. sections created: §1330, §1391(f), §1441(d), §1602–11

Legislative history
- Introduced in the House as H.R. 11315 by Peter W. Rodino (D–NJ) on December 19, 1975; Committee consideration by House Judiciary Committee, Senate Judiciary Committee; Passed the House on September 29, 1976 (Voice vote); Passed the Senate on October 1, 1976 (Voice vote); Signed into law by President Gerald Ford on October 21, 1976

Major amendments
- Justice Against Sponsors of Terrorism Act

United States Supreme Court cases
- Dames & Moore v. Regan, 453 U.S. 654 (1981); Verlinden BV v. Central Bank of Nigeria, 461 U.S. 480 (1983); First Nat. City Bank v. Banco Para El Comercio Exterior De Cuba, 462 U.S. 611 (1983); Argentine Republic v. Amerada Hess Shipping Corp., 488 U.S. 428 (1989); Republic of Argentina v. Weltover, 504 U.S. 607 (1992); Saudi Arabia v. Nelson, 507 U.S. 349 (1993); Dole Food Co. v. Patrickson, 538 U.S. 468 (2003); Republic of Austria v. Altmann, 541 U.S. 677 (2004); Ministry of Defense and Support for Armed Forces of Islamic Republic of Iran v. Elahi, 546 U.S. 450 (2006); Permanent Mission of India v. City of New York, 551 U.S. 193 (2007); Powerex Corp. v. Reliant Energy Services, Inc., 551 U.S. 224 (2007); Republic of Philippines v. Pimentel, 553 U.S. 851 (2008); Ministry of Defense and Support for Armed Forces of Islamic Republic of Iran v. Elahi, 556 U.S. 366 (2009); Republic of Iraq v. Beaty, 556 U.S. 848 (2009); Samantar v. Yousuf, 560 U.S. 305 (2010); Republic of Argentina v. NML Capital, Ltd., 573 U.S. 134 (2014); OBB Personenverkehr AG v. Sachs, 577 U.S. 27 (2015); Bank Markazi v. Peterson, 578 U.S. 212 (2016); Bolivarian Republic of Venezuela v. Helmerich & Payne Int'l Drilling Co., 581 U.S. 170 (2017); Rubin v. Islamic Republic of Iran, 583 U.S. 202 (2018); Republic of Sudan v. Harrison, 587 U.S. 1 (2019); Jam v. International Finance Corp. (2019); Opati v. Republic of Sudan, 590 U.S. 418 (2020); Federal Republic of Germany v. Philipp, 592 U.S. 169 (2021); Cassirer v. Thyssen-Bornemisza Collection Foundation, 596 U.S. 107 (2022); Turkiye Halk Bankasi A.S. v. United States, 598 U.S. 254 (2023); Republic of Hungary v. Simon, No. 23-867, 604 U.S. ___ (2025); CC/Devas Ltd. v. Antrix Corp, No. 23-1201, 604 U.S. ___ (2025)

The Foreign Sovereign Immunities Act of 1976 (FSIA) is a United States law, codified at Title 28, §§ 1330, 1332, 1391(f), 1441(d), and 1602–1611 of the United States Code, that established criteria as to whether a foreign sovereign state (or its political subdivisions, agencies, or instrumentalities) is immune from the jurisdiction of the United States' federal or state courts. The Act also establishes specific procedures for service of process, attachment of property and execution of judgment in proceedings against a foreign state. The FSIA provides the exclusive basis and means to bring a civil suit against a foreign sovereign in the United States. It was signed into law by United States President Gerald Ford on October 21, 1976.

== History ==
Foreign state immunity has a long history in U.S. courts. In an early case, The Schooner Exchange v. M'Faddon, 11 U.S. 116 (1812), the Supreme Court held that a private party could not sue the government of France. The Court concluded that a plaintiff cannot sue a foreign sovereign claiming ownership to a warship which had taken refuge in Philadelphia. Following international practice and common law principles, U.S. courts routinely refused to hear claims against foreign governments, even where those claims related to commercial activities. The U.S. State Department followed the absolute theory of immunity for foreign states, and courts generally relied on suggestions of immunity by the State Department in actions against foreign sovereigns. In 1952, the U.S. State Department, noting changes in international practice, adopted the restrictive theory of sovereign immunity according to which the public acts (jure imperii) of a foreign state are entitled to immunity, while the private acts (jure gestionis) are not.

The United States was the first country to codify the law of foreign sovereign immunity by statute. The FSIA had three broad objectives: (1) to transfer responsibility for immunity determinations from the Department of State to the judiciary; (2) to define and codify the "restrictive" theory of immunity; and (3) to provide a comprehensive, uniform regime for litigation against foreign states and governmental agencies.

Though the Act places the determination of sovereign immunity fully in the hands of the judiciary, many courts have expressed reluctance to find that a defendant is a sovereign if the "state" in question is one that the U.S. government has not officially recognized, even if the defendant may arguably satisfy the definition of statehood under international law.

The enactment of the Justice Against Sponsors of Terrorism Act in 2016 has allowed U.S. citizens to sue foreign powers over terrorist acts committed on U.S. soil.

== Jurisdictional statute ==
The FSIA is a jurisdictional statute. It indicates what conditions must be met in order for a lawsuit against a foreign state to be instituted, not what conduct by a foreign sovereign is actionable. If a foreign defendant qualifies as a "foreign state" under the FSIA, the Act provides that it shall be immune to suit in any U.S. court—federal or state—unless a statutory exception to immunity applies. The applicability of an exception to immunity is a matter of subject-matter jurisdiction, meaning if there is no exception to immunity, a court cannot hear the claim and must dismiss the suit. In Verlinden B.V. v. Central Bank of Nigeria, the defendant challenged the jurisdiction of the district court, saying that FSIA could not give jurisdiction to the district court since it was not a case "arising under" federal law. The Supreme Court found that since any invocation of jurisdiction under the FSIA would necessarily involve analysis of the exceptions to FSIA, FSIA cases by definition arise under federal law.

Under the FSIA, the burden of proof is initially on the defendant to establish that it is a "foreign state" under the FSIA and therefore entitled to state immunity. "Foreign state" is defined at 28 U.S.C. § 1603(a),(b). Once the defendant establishes that it is a foreign state, for the lawsuit to proceed, the plaintiff must prove that one of the Act's exceptions to immunity apply. The exceptions define both the types of actions as to which immunity does not attach and the territorial nexus required for adjudication in U.S. courts. The Act creates a form of long-arm statute establishing jurisdiction over claims that meet the criteria.

The exceptions are listed at 28 U.S.C. §§ 1605, 1605A, and 1607. The most common exceptions are when the foreign state waives immunity (§ 1605(a)(1)) or agrees to submit a dispute to arbitration (§ 1605(a)(6)), engages in a commercial activity (§ 1605(a)(2)), commits a tort in the United States causing "personal injury or death, or damage to or loss of property" (such as a common traffic collision) (§ 1605(a)(5)), or expropriates property in violation of international law (§ 1605(a)(3)). The FSIA also excludes immunity in cases involving certain counterclaims (§ 1607) and admiralty claims (§ 1605(b)). Section 221 of the Antiterrorism and Effective Death Penalty Act of 1996 added an exception for U.S. victims of terrorism, for any government designated by the State Department as a state sponsor of terrorism. The Flatow Amendment was also added in 1996, named after lawyer Stephen Flatow who fought to sue Iran over the suicide bombing that killed his daughter Alisa in 1995, which made those responsible for such attacks liable in court.

In response to Cicippio-Puleo v. Islamic Republic of Iran, which made it difficult to bring private cause of action lawsuits against foreign states even with the Flatow Amendment, the National Defense Authorization Act for Fiscal Year 2008 greatly expanded the terrorism exceptions by moving these as a whole to § 1605A, making foreign states liable for the actions of their officers in cause of action lawsuits, and expanding exceptions for torture, extrajudicial killing, aircraft sabotage, and hostage-taking.

In 2016, the Justice Against Sponsors of Terrorism Act removed the requirement that a state sponsor of terrorism be officially listed, so that victim families of the September 11 attacks could sue Saudi Arabia.

== Scope and applicability ==
=== Retroactive application ===
In 2004, the Supreme Court held in Republic of Austria v. Altmann, 541 U.S. 677 (2004) that the FSIA applies retroactively. That case involved a claim by the descendants of owners of famous paintings against the Austrian government for return of those paintings, which were allegedly seized during the Nazi era. As a consequence of Altmann, for lawsuits filed after the enactment of the FSIA (1976), FSIA standards of immunity and its exceptions apply, even where the conduct that took place prior to enactment of the FSIA.

=== Exclusive basis for suit ===
In Argentine Republic v. Amerada Hess Shipping Corp., 488 U.S. 428 (1989), the Supreme Court held that the FSIA provides the "sole basis for obtaining jurisdiction over a foreign state". In that case, a Liberian-owned oil tanker which was traveling outside of the "war zones" designated by the United Kingdom and Argentina during the Falklands War in 1982 was struck by an air to surface rocket fired by an Argentine jet. The shipping company sued Argentina in federal court claiming that Argentina's actions violated the Alien Tort Statute 28 U.S.C. § 1350 and general admiralty law. Because the Court found that the FSIA provided the exclusive means of suing the foreign sovereign, the Court determined that the plaintiffs were not permitted to bring suit under the Alien Tort Statute or general admiralty law.

== Definition of "foreign state" ==
The FSIA only applies to lawsuits involving a foreign state. The FSIA defines (28 U.S.C. § 1603(a)) "foreign state" to include three entities:

- A foreign state
- A political subdivision of a foreign state
- An agency or instrumentality of a foreign state

"Agency or instrumentality" is then defined (28 U.S.C. § 1603(b)) as any entity which has a separate legal identity and is either:

- an "organ of a foreign state or political subdivision", or
- has a "majority of ... shares or other ownership interest" owned by a foreign state or political subdivision.

In Dole Food Co. v. Patrickson, 538 U.S. 468 (2003), the Supreme Court determined that in order for a government owned corporation to qualify as a foreign state under the FSIA because a majority of its "shares or other ownership interest" are owned by a foreign state or political subdivision, the foreign state must directly own a majority of the corporation's shares. In Dole, two chemical corporations indirectly owned by the Israeli government sought to remove a case from a Hawaii state court to the United States District Court for the District of Hawaii on the basis that the FSIA applied. The Supreme Court concluded that because the Israeli government did not directly own a majority of the companies shares, the corporations could not be considered foreign states and the FSIA therefore did not apply. The court specifically rejected the companies' argument that Israel's majority interest in the companies through indirect ownership qualified as an "other ownership interest" under the FSIA or that Israel's actual control over the corporations would qualify. In reaching its conclusion, the court also held that the determination as to whether a defendant qualifies as a foreign state is made at the time the plaintiff files the complaint.

There had been disagreement among the courts as to whether an individual government official is covered by the FSIA, and therefore immune to suit according to its provisions or whether traditional (pre-FSIA) common law rules of immunity apply. The majority of Federal Courts of Appeals had concluded that individuals are covered under § 1603(b) as "agencies or instrumentalities" of foreign states. See In re Terrorist Attacks on September 11, 2001, 538 F.3d 71 (2d Cir. 2008) (finding Saudi government officials to be entitled to immunity under the FSIA). Other courts however, noting that the language and structure of the FSIA and particularly § 1603(b) appear to contemplate that entities and not individuals are covered by the "agency or instrumentality" definition, had concluded that individuals are not entitled to immunity under the FSIA. See Yousuf v. Samantar, 552 F.3d 371 (4th Cir. 2009) (holding that former Somalian government official is not covered by, and therefore entitled to immunity under the FSIA and remanding to District Court to determine whether defendant is entitled to common law immunity).

However, the Supreme Court in 2010 decided that the Act does not extend immunity to a government official acting on behalf of a state. In the case of Samantar v. Yousuf decided in June 2010, the Supreme Court found that there is nothing to suggest that "foreign state" within the FSIA should be read to include an official acting on behalf of that state. Justice Stevens, with the unanimous support of the Supreme Court, made the decision into common law with his many paragraphs on the court case. This helped define what is considered to be a foreign state, which now included state officials acting within their jurisdiction.

Moreover, the potential of the FSIA to undermine foreign policy goals of the executive branch has been an ongoing concern.

== Commercial activity exception ==
The most important exception to sovereign immunity is the commercial activity exception, 28 U.S.C. § 1605(a)(2). This section provides three bases on which a plaintiff can sue a foreign state:

- When the plaintiff's claim is based upon a commercial activity carried on in the United States by the foreign state.
- When the plaintiff's claim is based upon an act by the foreign state which is performed in the United States in connection with commercial activity outside the United States.
- When the plaintiff's claim is based upon an act by the foreign state which is performed outside the United States in connection with commercial activity outside the United States and which causes a direct effect in the United States.

In determining whether a foreign state's activities are commercial, the FSIA requires that courts look to the nature of the act itself, rather than the purpose for which the foreign sovereign engaged in the act (28 U.S.C. § 1603(d)). For example, the operation of a fee-based transportation system would likely be a commercial act, while imposing fines for parking tickets would be a public act, even if the former was undertaken to provide a public service, and the latter was initiated to raise revenue.

Republic of Argentina v. Weltover, 504 U.S. 607 (1992), concerned a breach of contract claim asserted by the bond-holder (two Panamanian corporations and a Swiss bank) against the government (Argentina) that issued the bonds arising from Argentina's default on the bond payments. Under the terms of the bonds, the bond-holders were given the option of having the bonds paid in London, Frankfurt, Zürich, or New York. Because the case concerned a default in Argentina on bonds issued in Argentina (i.e., an act performed outside the United States in connection with activity outside the United States), in order to establish jurisdiction, the plaintiff's could only rely on the third basis to sue Argentina under the commercial activity exception. Argentina made two primary arguments as to why the FSIA commercial activity exception should not apply: (1) the issuance of sovereign debt to investors was not a "commercial" activity and (2) the alleged default could not be considered to have had a "direct effect" in the United States. In a unanimous opinion written by Justice Antonin Scalia, the Supreme Court held that Argentina was not entitled to sovereign immunity. Reasoning that "when a foreign government acts, not as regulator of a market, but in the manner of a private player within it, the foreign sovereign's actions are 'commercial'", the Court concluded that Argentina's issuance of the bonds was of a commercial character. As for the "direct effect" in the United States, the Court rejected the suggestion that under the FSIA the effect in the United States necessarily needed to be "substantial" or "foreseeable", and instead concluded that in order to be "direct", the effect need only follow "as an immediate consequence of the defendant's activity". Because New York was the place where payment was supposed to be made, and payment "was not forthcoming", the Court concluded that the effect was direct, notwithstanding the fact that none of the plaintiffs were situated in New York. Weltover's oral argument that won the unanimous decision was made by New York-based attorney Richard Cutler, while Argentina's losing position was argued by New York-based attorney Richard Davis.

The District Court for the District of Columbia held in Upton v Empire of Iran, 459 F. Supp. 264 (D.D.C. 1978), that "direct effect" is to be given its common sense interpretation: a direct effect "has no intervening element, but, rather, flows in a straight line without deviation or interruption".

The involvement of a US citizen or a body incorporated in the United States is not in itself sufficient to establish a "direct effect" in the United States if a case involves no other form of direct connection.

In 2015, the Supreme Court unanimously held in OBB Personenverkehr AG v. Sachs that the purchase of a rail ticket from an authorized agent in the US does not fall within the commercial activity exception when the lawsuit concerns a rail accident in a foreign country. Carol Sachs, a US resident, purchased a Eurail pass on the internet from a US-based travel agent. She used the pass to board a train operated by the Austrian national railway, ÖBB Personenverkehr AG (ÖBB), but during the process she fell onto the tracks and her legs were crushed by the moving train, requiring the amputation of both of her legs. Sachs sued ÖBB in the United States District Court for the Northern District of California for damages related to the incident. She reasoned that the suit was not barred by the FSIA because it was "based upon" the sale of the ticket by the US-based travel agent. The court ruled that the suit did not fall within the commercial activities exception. It was appealed to the United States Court of Appeals for the Ninth Circuit, which reversed the judgment, holding that the purchase of the ticket from a US-based travel agent established agency. The Supreme Court looked at the "particular conduct on which the [lawsuit] is based" and held that, because that conduct occurred in Austria, the case did not fall within the commercial activities exception.

=== Genocidal takings ===
One student's note has argued that matters of genocidal takings are regarded as exceeding the jurisdictional limits of the FSIA's international takings exception. In June 2017, a divided panel of the United States Court of Appeals for the District of Columbia Circuit found the FSIA did not prevent the survivors of a Holocaust victim from suing to recover art stolen by Nazi plunderers. However, the ruling was challenged by Germany to the United States Supreme Court, which ruled in a unanimous decision in February 2021 that FSIA does not permit legal action to be taken against foreign states for property taken from individuals by foreign states, as the provisions of FSIA are directed towards state property taken by other states, and vacated the lower court rulings. The case, Germany v. Philipp, dealt with the applicability of the FSIA for heirs of victims of the Holocaust to sue Germany in the United States court systems for compensation for items that were taken by the Nazi Party during World War II. The court unanimously ruled that FSIA does not allow these survivors to sue Germany in U.S. court, reasoning that the sale was an act of expropriation of property rather than an act of genocide, although granting that other means of recovery are still potentially available. The decision also concluded a related case, Hungary v. Simon, which was decided per curiam on the ruling of Germany.

=== Industrial espionage by state-owned enterprises ===
FSIA has been invoked by state-owned enterprises as well as their subsidiaries and joint ventures, particularly those owned by the People's Republic of China, accused of industrial espionage and intellectual property theft, as a defense from legal action.

=== COVID-19 ===
In The State of Missouri v. The People's Republic of China, Missouri sued China in April 2020 for economic damages caused by COVID-19. The U.S. District Court for the Eastern District of Missouri dismissed the case in July 2022, ruling that China had sovereign immunity. Missouri appealed. In January 2024, the U.S. Court of Appeals for the Eighth Circuit held that the FSIA barred all of Missouri's claims except one—alleging that China hoarded personal protective equipment—under the commercial activity exception. The Eighth Circuit Court reversed the dismissal of the hoarding claim and remanded the case for further proceedings. In March 2025, the district court ruled that Missouri "has established this claim of damages through evidence satisfactory to the court" and issued a default judgment against the defendants, awarding Missouri over $24 billion in damages.

== Notable legal cases ==
Cicippio-Puleo v. Islamic Republic of Iran in 2004 was heard after the additions of the Antiterrorism and Effective Death Penalty Act of 1996 and the Flatow Amendment to FSIA, which were related to punitive damages from emotional distress from family members of a surviving Lebanon hostage crisis from Iran. While an earlier case by the hostage was successful in winning compensatory damages in his original suit, the DC Circuit Court ruled that the amended FSIA did not allow for a private cause of action against a foreign state, only against individuals. This decision filtered through the other circuit courts, which prompted Congress to significantly modify the exemptions related to terrorism in the 2008 NDAA to specifically allow for foreign states to be sued on a private cause of action, retroactively applying this to the other legal cases pending at the time.

In 2008, Saudi Arabia invoked the FSIA to preclude a lawsuit filed by families and victims of the September 11 attacks who alleged that the Saudi leaders had indirectly financed al-Qaeda. Congress responded in 2016 by overriding President Obama's veto of the Justice Against Sponsors of Terrorism Act (JASTA), amending FSIA and allowing the families' suit against Saudi Arabia to proceed in U.S. courts.

In John V. Doe v. Holy See, 557 F.3d 1066 (9th Cir. 2009), the Holy See invoked the FSIA in a lawsuit related to child abuse incidents in various U.S. churches. The ruling ultimately did not rely on state immunity.

In Republic of Argentina v. NML Capital, Ltd., the Supreme Court ruled on June 16, 2014, against Argentina's appeal of a lower court ruling that Argentina's government must uphold its contractual obligation to pay in full those bondholders who refused to accept reduced payments negotiated in foreign debt restructurings carried out by Argentina in 2005 and 2010 after that state's government defaulted on its debt in 2001. Later the same day, the U.S. Supreme Court, in a 7–1 ruling (Associate Justice Sonia Sotomayor recused herself from both cases without giving a reason for doing so), gave permission for those bondholders to seek information on Argentina's assets in the United States and abroad by issuing subpoenas to banks to trace those assets.

In Republic of Sudan v. Harrison, the Supreme Court ruled in March 2019 that the FSIA requires that civil process (court summons and civil complaints) be addressed and delivered directly to the foreign minister of a foreign state, and that delivery to an embassy in the US is not sufficient.

In Opati v. Republic of Sudan, the Supreme Court unanimously ruled in May 2020 that FSIA allowed for punitive damages on a cause of action from conduct before the enactment of the FSIA, in a case related to the 1998 United States embassy bombings.

In Germany v. Philipp, the Supreme Court ruled in 2021 that the FSIA does not allow for survivors or heirs of victims of the Holocaust and Nazi Germany to sue Germany for compensation for possessions taken or forced into sale by the Nazi Party.

== Proposed amendments ==
On March 25, 2014, U.S. Representative Steve Chabot introduced the Foreign Cultural Exchange Jurisdictional Immunity Clarification Act (H.R. 4292; 113th Congress) into the United States House of Representatives. According to a legislative digest provided by House Republicans, the bill "narrowly amends the Foreign Sovereign Immunities Act (FSIA) to make it easier for U.S. cultural and educational institutions to borrow art and other culturally significant objects from foreign countries". However, the changes made by the bill would not provide any immunity to art or objects that were "taken in violation of international law by Nazi Germany between January 30, 1933 and May 8, 1945". The Congressional Budget Office reported that "under current law, works of art loaned by foreign governments generally are immune to certain decisions made by federal courts and cannot be confiscated if the President, or the President's designee, determines that display of the works is in the national interest. However, commercial activity in which foreign governments are engaged does not have immunity in federal courts. H.R. 4292 would clarify that importing works of art into the United States for temporary display is not a commercial activity, and thus that such works would be immune from seizure". The bill was scheduled to be voted on under suspension of the rules on May 6, 2014. In May 2016 the Senate passed a bill called the Justice Against Sponsors of Terrorism Act which also was passed by the house shortly after. Obama vetoed the bill in September 2016, but the Senate overrode the veto in a 97–1 vote. With the bill becoming a law it added an amended the Foreign Sovereign Immunities Act to allow the families of 9/11 to sue the sponsors of "terrorist attacks on U.S. soil", as chairman Goodlatte said on the override vote.

== See also ==
- Long-arm jurisdiction
