= 2019 term United States Supreme Court opinions of Sonia Sotomayor =

Opinions of Supreme Court Justice Sonia Sotomayor

The 2019 term of the Supreme Court of the United States began October 7, 2019, and concluded October 4, 2020. This was the eleventh term of Associate Justice Sonia Sotomayor's tenure on the Court.
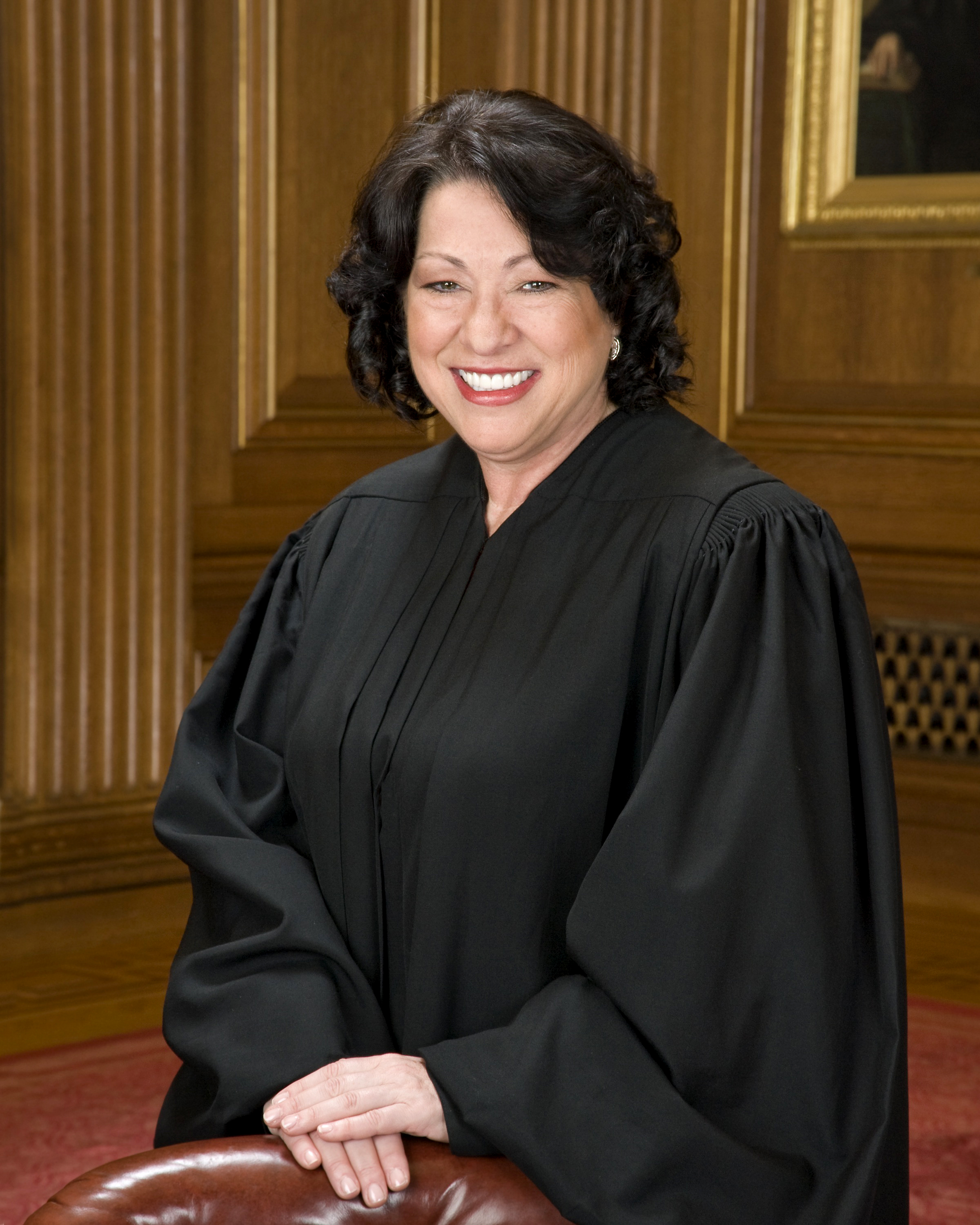

Sonia Sotomayor 2019 term statistics

5	Majority or plurality	8	Concurrence	10	Other
14	Dissent	1	Concurrence/dissent	Total =	38
Bench opinions = 22		Opinions relating to orders = 16		In-chambers opinions = 0
Unanimous opinions: 2		Most joined by: Ginsburg (15)		Least joined by: Thomas (2 in full, 1 in part)

Type	Case	Citation	Issues	Joined by	Other opinions
	Rotkiske v. Klemm	589 U.S. ___ (2019)	Statute of limitations • Equitable tolling • Statutory interpretation		Thomas; Ginsburg
	Peter v. NantKwest, Inc.	589 U.S. ___ (2019)	American Rule • Attorney fees • Patents	Unanimous	
	CITGO Asphalt Refining Co. v. Frescati Shipping Co.	589 U.S. ___ (2020)	admiralty law • warranty of safety • safe-berth clause	Roberts, Ginsburg, Breyer, Kagan, Gorsuch, Kavanaugh	Thomas
	Kansas v. Glover	589 U.S. ___ (2020)	Fourth Amendment • investigative traffic stop due to revoked license		Thomas; Kagan
	Babb v. Wilkie	589 U.S. ___ (2020)	Age Discrimination in Employment Act of 1967 • age as factor in federal-sector personnel actions	Ginsburg	Alito; Thomas
	Rhines v. Young	589 U.S. ___ (2019)	state clemency process • access by defendant's experts		
Sotomayor filed a statement respecting the Court's denial of certiorari.
	Peithman v. United States	589 U.S. ___ (2019)	civil forfeiture • joint and several liability		
Sotomayor dissented from the Court's denial of certiorari.
	Isom v. Arkansas	589 U.S. ___ (2019)			
Sotomayor filed a statement respecting the Court's denial of certiorari.
	Schexnayder v. Vannoy	589 U.S. ___ (2019)			
Sotomayor filed a statement respecting the Court's denial of certiorari.
	Cottier v. United States	589 U.S. ___ (2019)			
Sotomayor filed a statement respecting the Court's denial of certiorari.
	Wolf v. Cook County	589 U.S. ___ (2020)	immigration law • inadmissibility of those likely to become public charge • standard for granting stay		
Sotomayor dissented from the Court's grant of application for stay.
	Reed v. Texas	589 U.S. ___ (2020)	actual innocence		
Sotomayor filed a statement respecting the denial of certiorari.
	Halprin v. Davis	589 U.S. ___ (2020)	Due Process Clause • racial judicial bias		
Sotomayor filed a statement respecting the denial of certiorari.
	Ramos v. Louisiana	590 U.S. ___ (2020)	Sixth Amendment • unanimity of jury verdict		Gorsuch; Thomas; Kavanaugh; Alito
	Romag Fasteners, Inc. v. Fossil, Inc.	590 U.S. ___ (2020)	trademark law • Lanham Act • award of profits for infringement		Gorsuch; Alito
	Barton v. Barr	590 U.S. ___ (2020)	immigration law • cancellation of removal eligibility	Ginsburg, Breyer, Kagan	Kavanaugh
	Maine Community Health Options v. United States	590 U.S. ___ (2020)	Patient Protection and Affordable Care Act • government obligation to reimburse insurer losses from online exchanges	Roberts, Ginsburg, Breyer, Kagan, Kavanaugh; Thomas, Gorsuch (in part)	Alito
	Lucky Brand Dungarees, Inc. v. Marcel Fashions Group, Inc.	590 U.S. ___ (2020)	trademark law • res judicata • defense preclusion	Unanimous	
	GE Energy Power Conversion France SAS v. Outokumpu Stainless USA, LLC	590 U.S. ___ (2020)	Federal Arbitration Act • New York Convention • equitable estoppel • enforcement of arbitration agreement by nonsignatories		Thomas
	Financial Oversight and Management Bd. for Puerto Rico v. Aurelius Investment, LLC	590 U.S. ___ (2020)	Puerto Rico Oversight, Management, and Economic Stability Act • Article II • Appointments Clause		Breyer; Thomas
	Thole v. U. S. Bank N. A.	590 U.S. ___ (2020)	Employee Retirement Income Security Act of 1974 • Article III • standing	Ginsburg, Breyer, Kagan	Kavanaugh; Thomas
	United States Forest Service v. Cowpasture River Preservation Assn.	590 U.S. ___ (2020)	United States Forest Service authority to grant pipeline right-of-way • National Trails System Act • Mineral Leasing Act	Kagan	Thomas
	Valentine v. Collier	590 U.S. ___ (2020)	Eighth Amendment • COVID-19 pandemic • Prison Litigation Reform Act of 1995 • exhaustion of remedies	Ginsburg	
Sotomayor filed a statement respecting the Court's denial of application to vacate stay.
	St. Hubert v. United States	590 U.S. ___ (2020)	Antiterrorism and Effective Death Penalty Act of 1996		
Sotomayor filed a statement respecting the Court's denial of certiorari.
	Department of Homeland Security v. Regents of Univ. of Cal.	591 U.S. ___ (2020)	Deferred Action for Childhood Arrivals • Administrative Procedure Act		Roberts; Thomas; Alito; Kavanaugh
	Liu v. SEC	591 U.S. ___ (2020)	securities law • disgorgement as equitable relief	Roberts, Ginsburg, Breyer, Alito, Kagan, Gorsuch, Kavanaugh	Thomas
	Department of Homeland Security v. Thuraissigiam	591 U.S. ___ (2020)	Illegal Immigration Reform and Immigrant Responsibility Act • eligibility for asylum • habeas corpus • Article One • Suspension Clause • Due Process Clause	Kagan	Alito; Thomas; Breyer
	Espinoza v. Montana Dept. of Revenue	591 U.S. ___ (2020)	state law prohibition on government aid to religious schools • First Amendment • Free Exercise Clause		Roberts; Thomas; Alito; Gorsuch; Ginsburg; Breyer
	Patent and Trademark Office v. Booking.com B. V.	591 U.S. ___ (2020)	trademark law • eligibility of generic term combined with domain name for protection		Ginsburg; Breyer
	Barr v. American Assn. of Political Consultants, Inc.	591 U.S. ___ (2020)	Telephone Consumer Protection Act of 1991 • prohibition of robocalls to cell phones • exception for government debt collection • First Amendment • free speech		Kavanaugh; Breyer; Gorsuch
	Our Lady of Guadalupe School v. Morrissey-Berru	591 U.S. ___ (2020)	First Amendment • ministerial exception to employment discrimination claims	Ginsburg	Alito; Thomas
	Barr v. Lee	591 U.S. ___ (2020)	Eighth Amendment • death penalty	Ginsburg, Kagan	per curiam; Breyer
Sotomayor dissented from the Court's grant of application for stay or vacatur.
	Texas Democratic Party v. Abbott	591 U.S. ___ (2020)	Twenty-sixth Amendment		
Sotomayor filed a statement respecting the Court's denial of application to vacate stay.
	Barr v. Purkey	591 U.S. ___ (2020)	Eighth Amendment • death penalty	Ginsburg, Breyer, Kagan	Breyer
Sotomayor dissented from the Court's grant of application for stay or vacatur.
	Raysor v. DeSantis	591 U.S. ___ (2020)		Ginsburg, Kagan	
Sotomayor dissented from the Court's denial of application to vacate stay.
	Little v. Reclaim Idaho	591 U.S. ___ (2020)		Ginsburg	Roberts
Sotomayor dissented from the Court's grant of application for stay.
	Barnes v. Ahlman	591 U.S. ___ (2020)		Ginsburg	
Sotomayor dissented from the Court's grant of application for stay.
	Mitchell v. United States	591 U.S. ___ (2020)	Federal Death Penalty Act of 1994		
Sotomayor filed a statement respecting the Court's denial of application for stay of execution.
