= 2019 term United States Supreme Court opinions of Clarence Thomas =

The 2019 term of the Supreme Court of the United States began October 7, 2019, and concluded October 4, 2020. This was the twenty-ninth term of Associate Justice Clarence Thomas's tenure on the Court.
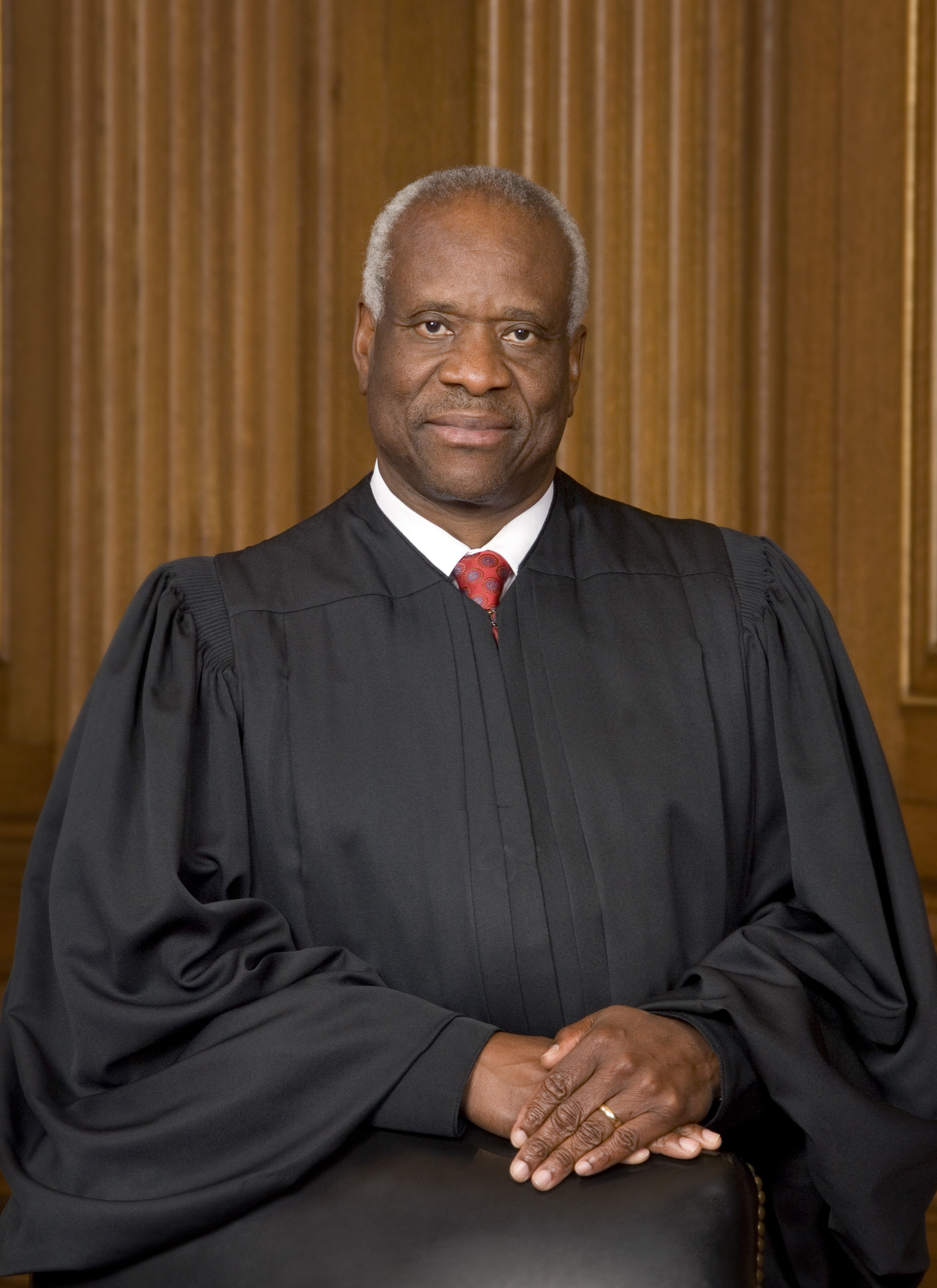

Clarence Thomas 2019 term statistics

5	Majority or plurality	14	Concurrence	0	Other
20	Dissent	2	Concurrence/dissent	Total =	41
Bench opinions = 31		Opinions relating to orders = 10		In-chambers opinions = 0
Unanimous opinions: 1		Most joined by: Gorsuch (15 in full, 1 in part)		Least joined by: Sotomayor (2)

Type	Case	Citation	Issues	Joined by	Other opinions
	Rotkiske v. Klemm	589 U.S. ___ (2019)		Roberts, Breyer, Alito, Sotomayor, Kagan, Gorsuch, Kavanaugh	Sotomayor; Ginsburg
	Monasky v. Taglieri	589 U.S. ___ (2020)	International Child Abduction Remedies Act • habitual residence of child		Ginsburg; Alito
	Hernandez v. Mesa	589 U.S. ___ (2020)	Fourth Amendment • Fifth Amendment • cross-border shooting by federal agent	Gorsuch	Alito; Ginsburg
	Kansas v. Garcia	589 U.S. ___ (2020)	Immigration Reform and Control Act of 1986 • fraudulent employee documents • federal preemption	Gorsuch	Alito; Breyer
	Guerrero-Lasprilla v. Barr	589 U.S. ___ (2020)	Immigration and Nationality Act • judicial review of removal proceedings • statute of limitations	Alito (in part)	Breyer
	Allen v. Cooper	589 U.S. ___ (2020)	copyright law • Intellectual Property Clause • Fourteenth Amendment • Copyright Remedy Clarification Act of 1990 • state sovereign immunity from infringement claims		Kagan; Breyer
	CITGO Asphalt Refining Co. v. Frescati Shipping Co.	589 U.S. ___ (2020)	admiralty law • warranty of safety • safe-berth clause	Alito	Sotomayor
	Kansas v. Glover	589 U.S. ___ (2020)	Fourth Amendment • investigative traffic stop due to revoked license	Roberts, Ginsburg, Breyer, Alito, Kagan, Gorsuch, Kavanaugh	Kagan; Sotomayor
	Babb v. Wilkie	589 U.S. ___ (2020)	Age Discrimination in Employment Act of 1967 • age as factor in federal-sector personnel actions		Alito; Sotomayor
	Lipschultz v. Charter Advanced Services	589 U.S. ___ (2019)	state regulation of voice over IP • federal preemption • Article VI • Supremacy Clause	Gorsuch	
Thomas concurred in the Court's denial of certiorari.
	Arizona v. California	589 U.S. ___ (2020)	Article III • original jurisdiction	Alito	
Thomas dissented from the Court's denial of motion for leave to file a complaint.
	Baldwin v. United States	589 U.S. ___ (2020)	administrative law • Chevron deference • Article III • Administrative Procedure Act		
Thomas dissented from the Court's denial of certiorari.
	VF Jeanswear LP v. EEOC	589 U.S. ___ (2020)	Civil Rights Act of 1964 • Title VII • investigative power of Equal Employment Opportunity Commission after lawsuit filed		
Thomas dissented from the Court's denial of certiorari.
	Ramos v. Louisiana	590 U.S. ___ (2020)	Sixth Amendment • unanimity of jury verdict • Fourteenth Amendment • Privileges and Immunities Clause		Gorsuch; Sotomayor; Kavanaugh; Alito
	County of Maui v. Hawaii Wildlife Fund	590 U.S. ___ (2020)	Clean Water Act • pollutant discharge without permit into navigable waters	Gorsuch	Breyer; Kavanaugh; Alito
	Georgia v. Public.Resource.Org, Inc.	590 U.S. ___ (2020)	copyright law • government edicts doctrine • copyrightability of annotated legislative code	Alito; Breyer (in part)	Roberts; Ginsburg
	United States v. Sineneng-Smith	590 U.S. ___ (2020)	First Amendment • overbreadth doctrine		Ginsburg
	GE Energy Power Conversion France SAS v. Outokumpu Stainless USA, LLC	590 U.S. ___ (2020)	Federal Arbitration Act • New York Convention • equitable estoppel • enforcement of arbitration agreement by nonsignatories	Unanimous	Sotomayor
	Financial Oversight and Management Bd. for Puerto Rico v. Aurelius Investment, LLC	590 U.S. ___ (2020)	Puerto Rico Oversight, Management, and Economic Stability Act • Article II • Appointments Clause		Breyer; Sotomayor
	Thole v. U. S. Bank N. A.	590 U.S. ___ (2020)	Employee Retirement Income Security Act of 1974 • Article III • standing	Gorsuch	Kavanaugh; Sotomayor
	Nasrallah v. Barr	590 U.S. ___ (2020)	immigration law • Convention Against Torture • judicial review of factual challenges to removal order	Alito	Kavanaugh
	United States Forest Service v. Cowpasture River Preservation Assn.	590 U.S. ___ (2020)	United States Forest Service authority to grant pipeline right-of-way • National Trails System Act • Mineral Leasing Act	Roberts, Breyer, Alito, Gorsuch, Kavanaugh; Ginsburg (in part)	Sotomayor
	Robinson v. Department of Education	590 U.S. ___ (2020)	Fair Credit Reporting Act • sovereign immunity	Kavanaugh	
Thomas dissented from the Court's denial of certiorari.
	Wexford Health v. Garrett	590 U.S. ___ (2020)	Prison Litigation Reform Act of 1995 • exhaustion of remedies • postrelease amended complaint		
Thomas dissented from the Court's denial of certiorari.
	Jarchow v. State Bar of Wis.	590 U.S. ___ (2020)		Gorsuch	
Thomas dissented from the Court's denial of certiorari.
	Rogers v. Grewal	590 U.S. ___ (2020)		Kavanaugh (in part)	
Thomas dissented from the Court's denial of certiorari.
	Baxter v. Bracey	590 U.S. ___ (2020)			
Thomas dissented from the Court's denial of certiorari.
	Department of Homeland Security v. Regents of Univ. of Cal.	591 U.S. ___ (2020)	Deferred Action for Childhood Arrivals • Administrative Procedure Act	Alito, Gorsuch	Roberts; Alito; Sotomayor; Kavanaugh
	Liu v. SEC	591 U.S. ___ (2020)	securities law • disgorgement as equitable relief		Sotomayor
	Department of Homeland Security v. Thuraissigiam	591 U.S. ___ (2020)	Illegal Immigration Reform and Immigrant Responsibility Act • eligibility for asylum • habeas corpus • Article One • Suspension Clause • Due Process Clause		Alito; Breyer; Sotomayor
	Seila Law LLC v. Consumer Financial Protection Bureau	591 U.S. ___ (2020)	Dodd-Frank Wall Street Reform and Consumer Protection Act • limitations on removal of Consumer Financial Protection Bureau director • Article Two • separation of powers	Gorsuch	Roberts; Kagan
	June Medical Services, LLC v. Russo	591 U.S. ___ (2020)	abortion laws • requirement that abortion clinic doctors have hospital admitting privileges • Fourteenth Amendment • stare decisis • third-party standing		Breyer; Roberts; Alito; Gorsuch; Kavanaugh
	Agency for Int'l Development v. Alliance for Open Society	591 U.S. ___ (2020)	United States Leadership Against HIV/AIDS, Tuberculosis, and Malaria Act of 2003 • policy statements against prostitution and sex trafficking as requirement for funding • First Amendment • free speech • speech by foreign affiliates of U.S. organizations		Kavanaugh; Breyer
	Espinoza v. Montana Dept. of Revenue	591 U.S. ___ (2020)	state law prohibition on government aid to religious schools • First Amendment • Free Exercise Clause • Establishment Clause	Gorsuch	Roberts; Alito; Gorsuch; Ginsburg; Breyer; Sotomayor
	Chiafalo v. Washington	591 U.S. ___ (2020)	Article II • Electoral College • state law penalty for faithless electors • Twelfth Amendment • Tenth Amendment	Gorsuch (in part)	Kagan
	Little Sisters of the Poor Saints Peter and Paul Home v. Pennsylvania	591 U.S. ___ (2020)	Patient Protection and Affordable Care Act of 2010 • religious and moral exemptions from contraceptive mandate • Administrative Procedure Act • Religious Freedom Restoration Act of 1993	Roberts, Alito, Gorsuch, Kavanaugh	Alito; Kagan; Ginsburg
	Our Lady of Guadalupe School v. Morrissey-Berru	591 U.S. ___ (2020)	First Amendment • ministerial exception to employment discrimination claims	Gorsuch	Alito; Sotomayor
	Trump v. Vance	591 U.S. ___ (2020)	Article II • Supremacy Clause • issuance of state criminal subpoena to sitting president		Roberts; Kavanaugh; Alito
	Trump v. Mazars USA, LLP	591 U.S. ___ (2020)	issuance of congressional subpoena to sitting president • separation of powers		Roberts; Alito
	McGirt v. Oklahoma	591 U.S. ___ (2020)	Major Crimes Act • status of Creek Reservation • Oklahoma Enabling Act		Gorsuch; Roberts
	Kansas v. Boettger	591 U.S. ___ (2020)			
Thomas dissented from the Court's denial of certiorari.
