= 2019 term United States Supreme Court opinions of Samuel Alito =

The 2019 term of the Supreme Court of the United States began October 7, 2019, and concluded October 4, 2020. This was the fifteenth term of Associate Justice Samuel Alito's tenure on the Court.
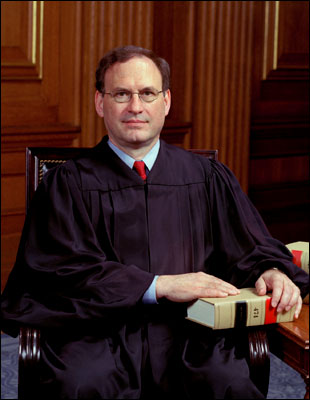

Samuel Alito 2019 term statistics

| 6 | Majority or plurality | 7 | Concurrence | 1 | Other |
| 12 | Dissent | 2 | Concurrence/dissent | Total = | 28 |
| Bench opinions = 24 | | Opinions relating to orders = 4 | | In-chambers opinions = 0 |
| Unanimous opinions: 1 | | Most joined by: Gorsuch (13) | | Least joined by: Ginsburg (1 in full, 1 in part) |

| Type | Case | Citation | Issues | Joined by | Other opinions |
|---|---|---|---|---|---|
| | Roman Catholic Archdiocese of San Juan v. Acevedo Feliciano | 589 U.S. ___ (2019) | legal organization of Roman Catholic Church • effect of First Amendment on civil liability of religious organization | Thomas | per curiam |
| | Monasky v. Taglieri | 589 U.S. ___ (2020) | International Child Abduction Remedies Act • habitual residence of child | | Ginsburg; Thomas |
| | Hernandez v. Mesa | 589 U.S. ___ (2020) | Fourth Amendment • Fifth Amendment • cross-border shooting by federal agent | Roberts, Thomas, Gorsuch, Kavanaugh | Thomas; Ginsburg |
| | Holguin-Hernandez v. United States | 589 U.S. ___ (2020) | Federal Rules of Criminal Procedure • preserving claims of error for appeal | Gorsuch | Breyer |
| | Intel Corp. Investment Policy Comm. v. Sulyma | 589 U.S. ___ (2020) | Employee Retirement Income Security Act of 1974 • statute of limitations based on actual knowledge of fiduciary breach | Unanimous | |
| | Kansas v. Garcia | 589 U.S. ___ (2020) | Immigration Reform and Control Act of 1986 • fraudulent employee documents • federal preemption | Roberts, Thomas, Gorsuch, Kavanaugh | Thomas; Breyer |
| | National Review, Inc. v. Mann | 589 U.S. ___ (2019) | | | |
Alito dissented from the Court's denial of certiorari.
| | Barr v. Roane | 589 U.S. ___ (2019) | capital punishment | Gorsuch, Kavanaugh | |
Alito filed a statement respecting the Court's denial of stay or vacatur.
| | Babb v. Wilkie | 589 U.S. ___ (2020) | Age Discrimination in Employment Act of 1967 • age as factor in federal-sector personnel actions | Roberts, Breyer, Sotomayor, Kagan, Gorsuch, Kavanaugh; Ginsburg (in part) | Sotomayor; Thomas |
| | Patterson v. Walgreen Co. | 589 U.S. ___ (2020) | Title VII • religious employment discrimination | Thomas, Gorsuch | |
Alito concurred in the Court's denial of certiorari.
| | Atlantic Richfield Co. v. Christian | 590 U.S. ___ (2020) | Comprehensive Environmental Response, Compensation, and Liability Act • state law claims • potentially responsible parties | | Roberts; Gorsuch |
| | Ramos v. Louisiana | 590 U.S. ___ (2020) | Sixth Amendment • unanimity of jury verdict | Roberts; Kagan (in part) | Gorsuch; Thomas; Sotomayor; Kavanaugh |
| | County of Maui v. Hawaii Wildlife Fund | 590 U.S. ___ (2020) | Clean Water Act • pollutant discharge without permit into navigable waters | | Breyer; Kavanaugh; Thomas |
| | Romag Fasteners, Inc. v. Fossil, Inc. | 590 U.S. ___ (2020) | trademark law • Lanham Act • award of profits for infringement | Breyer, Kagan | Gorsuch; Sotomayor |
| | Maine Community Health Options v. United States | 590 U.S. ___ (2020) | Patient Protection and Affordable Care Act • government obligation to reimburse insurer losses from online exchanges | | Sotomayor |
| | New York State Rifle & Pistol Assn., Inc. v. City of New York | 590 U.S. ___ (2020) | Second Amendment • firearm regulations | Gorsuch; Thomas (in part) | per curiam; Kavanaugh |
| | Banister v. Davis | 590 U.S. ___ (2020) | Federal Rules of Civil Procedure • motion to amend judgment • Antiterrorism and Effective Death Penalty Act of 1996 | Thomas | Kagan |
| | Bostock v. Clayton County | 590 U.S. ___ (2020) | Title VII • LGBTQ employment discrimination • sex discrimination | Thomas | Gorsuch; Kavanaugh |
| | Andrus v. Texas | 590 U.S. ___ (2020) | Sixth Amendment • ineffective assistance of counsel | Thomas, Gorsuch | per curiam |
| | Department of Homeland Security v. Regents of Univ. of Cal. | 591 U.S. ___ (2020) | Deferred Action for Childhood Arrivals • Administrative Procedure Act | | Roberts; Thomas; Sotomayor; Kavanaugh |
| | Department of Homeland Security v. Thuraissigiam | 591 U.S. ___ (2020) | Illegal Immigration Reform and Immigrant Responsibility Act • eligibility for asylum • habeas corpus • Article One • Suspension Clause • Due Process Clause | Roberts, Thomas, Gorsuch, Kavanaugh | Thomas; Breyer; Sotomayor |
| | June Medical Services, LLC v. Russo | 591 U.S. ___ (2020) | abortion laws • requirement that abortion clinic doctors have hospital admitting privileges • Fourteenth Amendment • stare decisis • third-party standing | Gorsuch; Thomas, Kavanaugh (in part) | Breyer; Roberts; Thomas; Gorsuch; Kavanaugh |
| | Espinoza v. Montana Dept. of Revenue | 591 U.S. ___ (2020) | state law prohibition on government aid to religious schools • First Amendment • Free Exercise Clause | | Roberts; Thomas; Gorsuch; Ginsburg; Breyer; Sotomayor |
| | Little Sisters of the Poor Saints Peter and Paul Home v. Pennsylvania | 591 U.S. ___ (2020) | Patient Protection and Affordable Care Act of 2010 • religious and moral exemptions from contraceptive mandate • Administrative Procedure Act • Religious Freedom Restoration Act of 1993 | Gorsuch | Thomas; Kagan; Ginsburg |
| | Our Lady of Guadalupe School v. Morrissey-Berru | 591 U.S. ___ (2020) | First Amendment • ministerial exception to employment discrimination claims | Roberts, Thomas, Breyer, Kagan, Gorsuch, Kavanaugh | Thomas; Sotomayor |
| | Trump v. Vance | 591 U.S. ___ (2020) | Article II • Supremacy Clause • issuance of state criminal subpoena to sitting president | | Roberts; Kavanaugh; Thomas |
| | Trump v. Mazars USA, LLP | 591 U.S. ___ (2020) | issuance of congressional subpoena to sitting president • separation of powers | | Roberts; Thomas |
| | Calvary Chapel Dayton Valley v. Sisolak | 591 U.S. ___ (2020) | | Thomas, Kavanaugh | Gorsuch; Kavanaugh |
Alito dissented from the Court's denial of application for injunctive relief.
