= 2019 term United States Supreme Court opinions of Stephen Breyer =

The 2019 term of the Supreme Court of the United States began October 7, 2019, and concluded October 4, 2020. This was the twenty-sixth term of Associate Justice Stephen Breyer's tenure on the Court.
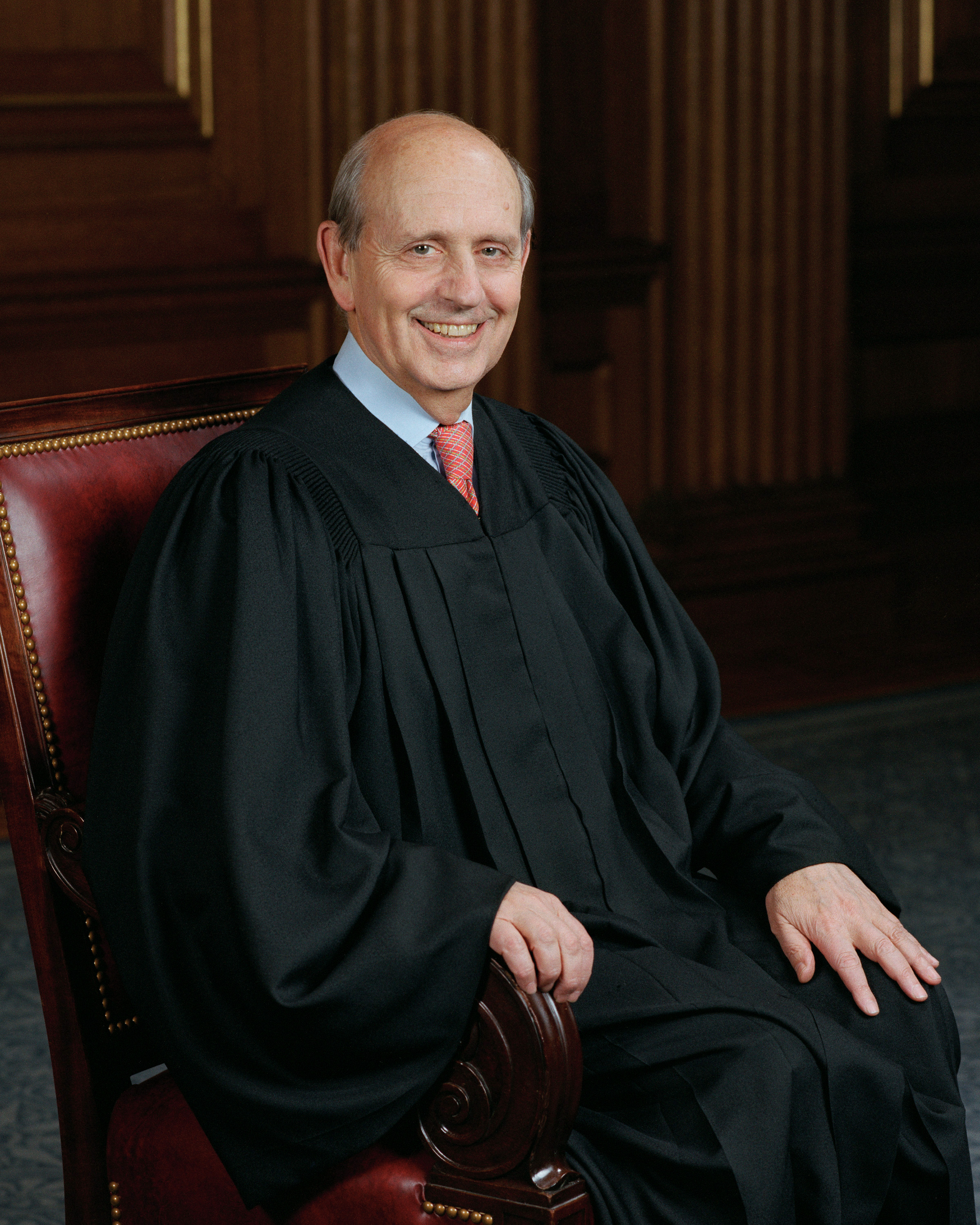

Stephen Breyer 2019 term statistics

| 5 | Majority or plurality | 2 | Concurrence | 1 | Other |
| 7 | Dissent | 2 | Concurrence/dissent | Total = | 17 |
| Bench opinions = 14 | | Opinions relating to orders = 3 | | In-chambers opinions = 0 |
| Unanimous opinions: 1 | | Most joined by: Ginsburg (14) | | Least joined by: Thomas (1) |

| Type | Case | Citation | Issues | Joined by | Other opinions |
|---|---|---|---|---|---|
| | Holguin-Hernandez v. United States | 589 U.S. ___ (2020) | Federal Rules of Criminal Procedure • preserving claims of error for appeal | Unanimous | Alito |
| | Kansas v. Garcia | 589 U.S. ___ (2020) | Immigration Reform and Control Act of 1986 • fraudulent employee documents • federal preemption | Ginsburg, Sotomayor, Kagan | Alito; Thomas |
| | Guerrero-Lasprilla v. Barr | 589 U.S. ___ (2020) | Immigration and Nationality Act • judicial review of removal proceedings • statute of limitations | Roberts, Ginsburg, Sotomayor, Kagan, Gorsuch, Kavanaugh | Thomas |
| | Allen v. Cooper | 589 U.S. ___ (2020) | copyright law • Intellectual Property Clause • Fourteenth Amendment • Copyright Remedy Clarification Act of 1990 • state sovereign immunity from infringement claims | Ginsburg | Kagan; Thomas |
| | Kahler v. Kansas | 589 U.S. ___ (2020) | Fourteenth Amendment • Due Process Clause • insanity defense | Ginsburg, Sotomayor | Kagan |
| | McKeever v. Barr | 589 U.S. ___ (2020) | Federal Rules of Criminal Procedure • release of grand jury information by District Court | | |
Breyer filed a statement respecting the Court's denial of certiorari.
| | County of Maui v. Hawaii Wildlife Fund | 590 U.S. ___ (2020) | Clean Water Act • pollutant discharge without permit into navigable waters | Roberts, Ginsburg, Sotomayor, Kagan, Kavanaugh | Kavanaugh; Thomas; Alito |
| | Financial Oversight and Management Bd. for Puerto Rico v. Aurelius Investment, LLC | 590 U.S. ___ (2020) | Puerto Rico Oversight, Management, and Economic Stability Act • Article II • Appointments Clause | Roberts, Ginsburg, Alito, Kagan, Gorsuch, Kavanaugh | Thomas; Sotomayor |
| | Department of Homeland Security v. Thuraissigiam | 591 U.S. ___ (2020) | Illegal Immigration Reform and Immigrant Responsibility Act • eligibility for asylum • habeas corpus • Article One • Suspension Clause • Due Process Clause | Ginsburg | Alito; Thomas; Sotomayor |
| | June Medical Services, LLC v. Russo | 591 U.S. ___ (2020) | abortion laws • requirement that abortion clinic doctors have hospital admitting privileges • Fourteenth Amendment • third-party standing | Ginsburg, Sotomayor, Kagan | Roberts; Thomas; Alito; Gorsuch; Kavanaugh |
| | Agency for Int'l Development v. Alliance for Open Society | 591 U.S. ___ (2020) | United States Leadership Against HIV/AIDS, Tuberculosis, and Malaria Act of 2003 • policy statements against prostitution and sex trafficking as requirement for funding • First Amendment • free speech • speech by foreign affiliates of U.S. organizations | Ginsburg, Sotomayor | Kavanaugh; Thomas |
| | Espinoza v. Montana Dept. of Revenue | 591 U.S. ___ (2020) | state law prohibition on government aid to religious schools • First Amendment • Free Exercise Clause | Kagan (in part) | Roberts; Thomas; Alito; Gorsuch; Ginsburg; Sotomayor |
| | Patent and Trademark Office v. Booking.com B. V. | 591 U.S. ___ (2020) | trademark law • eligibility of generic term combined with domain name for protection | | Ginsburg; Sotomayor |
| | Barr v. American Assn. of Political Consultants, Inc. | 591 U.S. ___ (2020) | Telephone Consumer Protection Act of 1991 • prohibition of robocalls to cell phones • exception for government debt collection • First Amendment • free speech | Ginsburg, Kagan | Kavanaugh; Sotomayor; Gorsuch |
| | Barr v. Lee | 591 U.S. ___ (2020) | Eighth Amendment • death penalty | Ginsburg | per curiam; Sotomayor |
Breyer dissented from the Court's grant of application for stay or vacatur.
| | Barr v. Purkey | 591 U.S. ___ (2020) | Eighth Amendment • death penalty | Ginsburg | Sotomayor |
Breyer dissented from the Court's grant of application for stay or vacatur.
| | Trump v. Sierra Club | 591 U.S. ___ (2020) | | Ginsburg, Sotomayor, Kagan | |
Breyer dissented from the Court's denial of motion to lift stay.
