= 2019 term United States Supreme Court opinions of Neil Gorsuch =

The 2019 term of the Supreme Court of the United States began October 7, 2019, and concluded October 4, 2020. This was the fourth term of Associate Justice Neil Gorsuch's tenure on the Court.
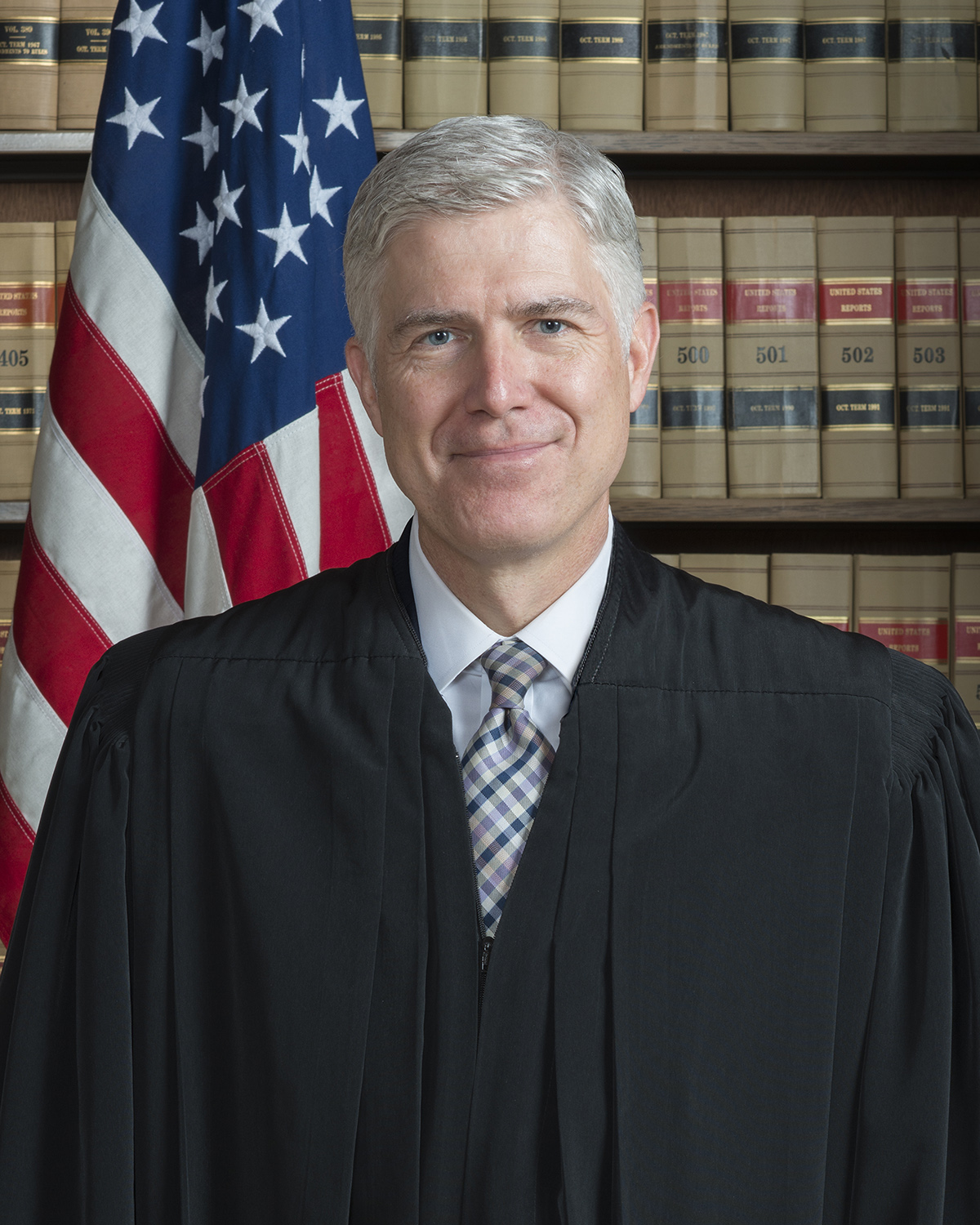

Neil Gorsuch 2019 term statistics

7	Majority or plurality	3	Concurrence	2	Other
3	Dissent	2	Concurrence/dissent	Total =	17
Bench opinions = 13		Opinions relating to orders = 4		In-chambers opinions = 0
Unanimous opinions: 1		Most joined by: Thomas (7 in full, 1 in part)		Least joined by: Kavanaugh (3 in full, 1 in part)

Type	Case	Citation	Issues	Joined by	Other opinions
	Retirement Plans Comm. of IBM v. Jander	589 U.S. ___ (2020)	ERISA		per curiam; Kagan
	Rodriguez v. FDIC	589 U.S. ___ (2020)	federal common law • entitlement to tax refund among affiliated corporations in absence of allocation agreement	Unanimous	
	Comcast Corp. v. National Assn. of African-American Owned Media	589 U.S. ___ (2020)	Civil Rights Act of 1866 • race as but-for causation	Roberts, Thomas, Breyer, Alito, Sotomayor, Kagan, Kavanaugh; Ginsburg (in part)	Ginsburg
	Department of Homeland Security v. New York	589 U.S. ___ (2020)		Thomas	
Gorsuch concurred in the Court's grant of application for stay.
	Guedes v. Bureau of Alcohol, Tobacco, Firearms and Explosives	589 U.S. ___ (2020)	firearm laws • classification of bump stock as illegal machine gun • Chevron deference		
Gorsuch filed a statement respecting the Court's denial of certiorari.
	Archdiocese of Washington v. Washington Metropolitan Transit Authority	589 U.S. ___ (2020)	First Amendment • public transit rejection of religious advertising	Thomas	
Gorsuch filed a statement respecting the Court's denial of certiorari.
	Atlantic Richfield Co. v. Christian	590 U.S. ___ (2020)	Comprehensive Environmental Response, Compensation, and Liability Act • state law claims • potentially responsible parties	Thomas	Roberts; Alito
	Thryv, Inc. v. Click-To-Call Technologies, LP	590 U.S. ___ (2020)	patent law • inter partes review	Sotomayor (in part)	Ginsburg
	Ramos v. Louisiana	590 U.S. ___ (2020)	Sixth Amendment • unanimity of jury verdict	Ginsburg, Breyer; Sotomayor, Kavanaugh (in part)	Thomas; Sotomayor; Kavanaugh; Alito
	Romag Fasteners, Inc. v. Fossil, Inc.	590 U.S. ___ (2020)	trademark law • Lanham Act • award of profits for infringement	Roberts, Thomas, Ginsburg, Breyer, Alito, Kagan, Kavanaugh	Alito; Sotomayor
	Opati v. Republic of Sudan	590 U.S. ___ (2020)	Foreign Sovereign Immunities Act • exception for state-sponsored terrorism • punitive damages • retroactive application to preenactment claims	Roberts, Thomas, Ginsburg, Breyer, Alito, Sotomayor, Kagan	
	Bostock v. Clayton County	590 U.S. ___ (2020)	Title VII • LGBTQ employment discrimination • sex discrimination	Roberts, Ginsburg, Breyer, Sotomayor, Kagan	Alito; Kavanaugh
	June Medical Services, LLC v. Russo	591 U.S. ___ (2020)	abortion laws • requirement that abortion clinic doctors have hospital admitting privileges • Fourteenth Amendment • stare decisis • third-party standing		Breyer; Roberts; Thomas; Alito; Kavanaugh
	Espinoza v. Montana Dept. of Revenue	591 U.S. ___ (2020)	state law prohibition on government aid to religious schools • First Amendment • Free Exercise Clause		Roberts; Thomas; Alito; Ginsburg; Breyer; Sotomayor
	Barr v. American Assn. of Political Consultants, Inc.	591 U.S. ___ (2020)	Telephone Consumer Protection Act of 1991 • prohibition of robocalls to cell phones • exception for government debt collection • First Amendment • free speech	Thomas (in part)	Kavanaugh; Sotomayor; Breyer
	McGirt v. Oklahoma	591 U.S. ___ (2020)	Major Crimes Act • status of Creek Reservation • Oklahoma Enabling Act	Ginsburg, Breyer, Sotomayor, Kagan	Roberts; Thomas
	Calvary Chapel Dayton Valley v. Sisolak	591 U.S. ___ (2020)			Alito; Kavanaugh
Gorsuch dissented from the Court's denial of application for injunctive relief.
