= 2019 term United States Supreme Court opinions of Brett Kavanaugh =

The 2019 term of the Supreme Court of the United States began October 7, 2019, and concluded October 4, 2020. This was the second term of Associate Justice Brett Kavanaugh's tenure on the Court.
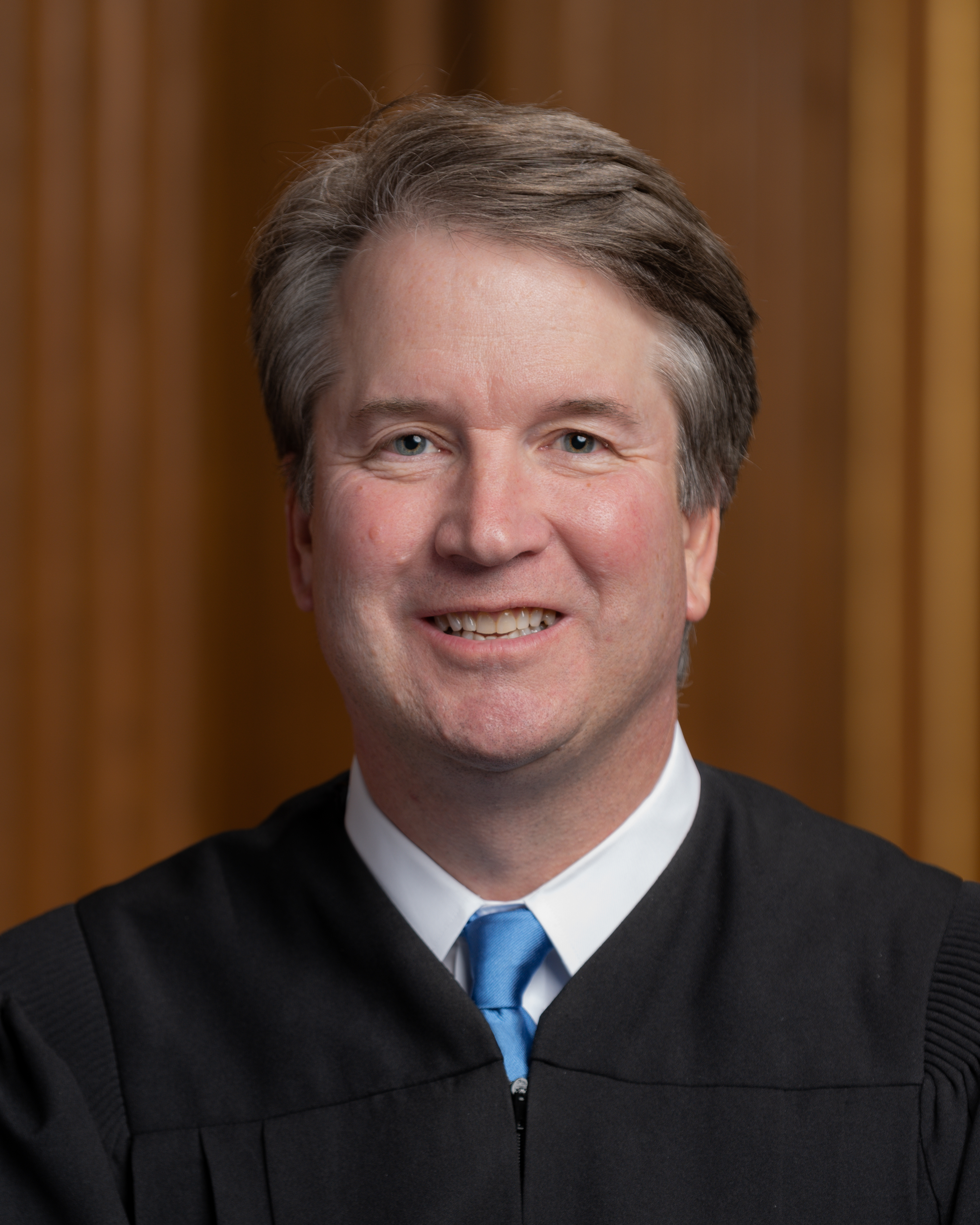

Brett Kavanaugh 2019 term statistics

6	Majority or plurality	5	Concurrence	2	Other
4	Dissent	1	Concurrence/dissent	Total =	18
Bench opinions = 14		Opinions relating to orders = 4		In-chambers opinions = 0
Unanimous opinions: 0		Most joined by: Gorsuch (7)		Least joined by: Ginsburg, Breyer, Sotomayor, Kagan (1)

Type	Case	Citation	Issues	Joined by	Other opinions
	McKinney v. Arizona	589 U.S. ___ (2020)	Eighth Amendment • death penalty • Sixth Amendment • right to jury determination of facts • reweighing of aggravating and mitigating circumstances by appellate court • retroactivity of constitutional rules on collateral or direct reviews	Roberts, Thomas, Alito, Gorsuch	Ginsburg
	Shular v. United States	589 U.S. ___ (2020)	Armed Career Criminal Act • definition of serious drug offense		Ginsburg
	Paul v. United States	589 U.S. ___ (2019)			
Kavanaugh filed a statement respecting the Court's denial of certiorari.
	Avery v. United States	589 U.S. ___ (2020)	successive petitions for postconviction relief		
Kavanaugh filed a statement respecting the Court's denial of certiorari.
	Ramos v. Louisiana	590 U.S. ___ (2020)	Sixth Amendment • unanimity of jury verdict		Gorsuch; Thomas; Sotomayor; Alito
	County of Maui v. Hawaii Wildlife Fund	590 U.S. ___ (2020)	Clean Water Act • pollutant discharge without permit into navigable waters		Breyer; Thomas; Alito
	Barton v. Barr	590 U.S. ___ (2020)	immigration law • cancellation of removal eligibility	Roberts, Thomas, Alito, Gorsuch	Sotomayor
	New York State Rifle & Pistol Assn., Inc. v. City of New York	590 U.S. ___ (2020)	Second Amendment • firearm regulations		per curiam; Alito
	Thole v. U. S. Bank N. A.	590 U.S. ___ (2020)	Employee Retirement Income Security Act of 1974 • Article III • standing	Roberts, Thomas, Alito, Gorsuch	Thomas; Sotomayor
	Nasrallah v. Barr	590 U.S. ___ (2020)	immigration law • Convention Against Torture • judicial review of factual challenges to removal order	Roberts, Ginsburg, Breyer, Sotomayor, Kagan, Gorsuch	Thomas
	Bostock v. Clayton County	590 U.S. ___ (2020)	Title VII • LGBTQ employment discrimination • sex discrimination		Gorsuch; Alito
	South Bay United Pentecostal Church v. Newsom	590 U.S. ___ (2020)	First Amendment • Free Exercise Clause • state public health orders in response to COVID-19 pandemic • impact of restrictions on religious services	Thomas, Gorsuch	Roberts
Kavanaugh dissented from the Court's denial of application for injunctive relief.
	Department of Homeland Security v. Regents of Univ. of Cal.	591 U.S. ___ (2020)	Deferred Action for Childhood Arrivals • Administrative Procedure Act		Roberts; Thomas; Alito; Sotomayor
	June Medical Services, LLC v. Russo	591 U.S. ___ (2020)	abortion laws • requirement that abortion clinic doctors have hospital admitting privileges • Fourteenth Amendment • stare decisis • third-party standing		Breyer; Roberts; Thomas; Alito; Gorsuch
	Agency for Int'l Development v. Alliance for Open Society	591 U.S. ___ (2020)	United States Leadership Against HIV/AIDS, Tuberculosis, and Malaria Act of 2003 • policy statements against prostitution and sex trafficking as requirement for funding • First Amendment • free speech • speech by foreign affiliates of U.S. organizations	Roberts, Thomas, Alito, Gorsuch	Thomas; Breyer
	Barr v. American Assn. of Political Consultants, Inc.	591 U.S. ___ (2020)	Telephone Consumer Protection Act of 1991 • prohibition of robocalls to cell phones • exception for government debt collection • First Amendment • free speech	Roberts, Alito; Thomas (in part)	Sotomayor; Breyer; Gorsuch
	Trump v. Vance	591 U.S. ___ (2020)	Article II • Supremacy Clause • issuance of state criminal subpoena to sitting president	Gorsuch	Roberts; Thomas; Alito
	Calvary Chapel Dayton Valley v. Sisolak	591 U.S. ___ (2020)			Alito; Gorsuch
Kavanaugh dissented from the Court's denial of application for injunctive relief.
