= 2019 term United States Supreme Court opinions of Ruth Bader Ginsburg =

The 2019 term of the Supreme Court of the United States began October 7, 2019, and concluded October 4, 2020. This was the twenty-seventh and final term of Associate Justice Ruth Bader Ginsburg's tenure on the Court; Ginsburg died on September 18, 2020.
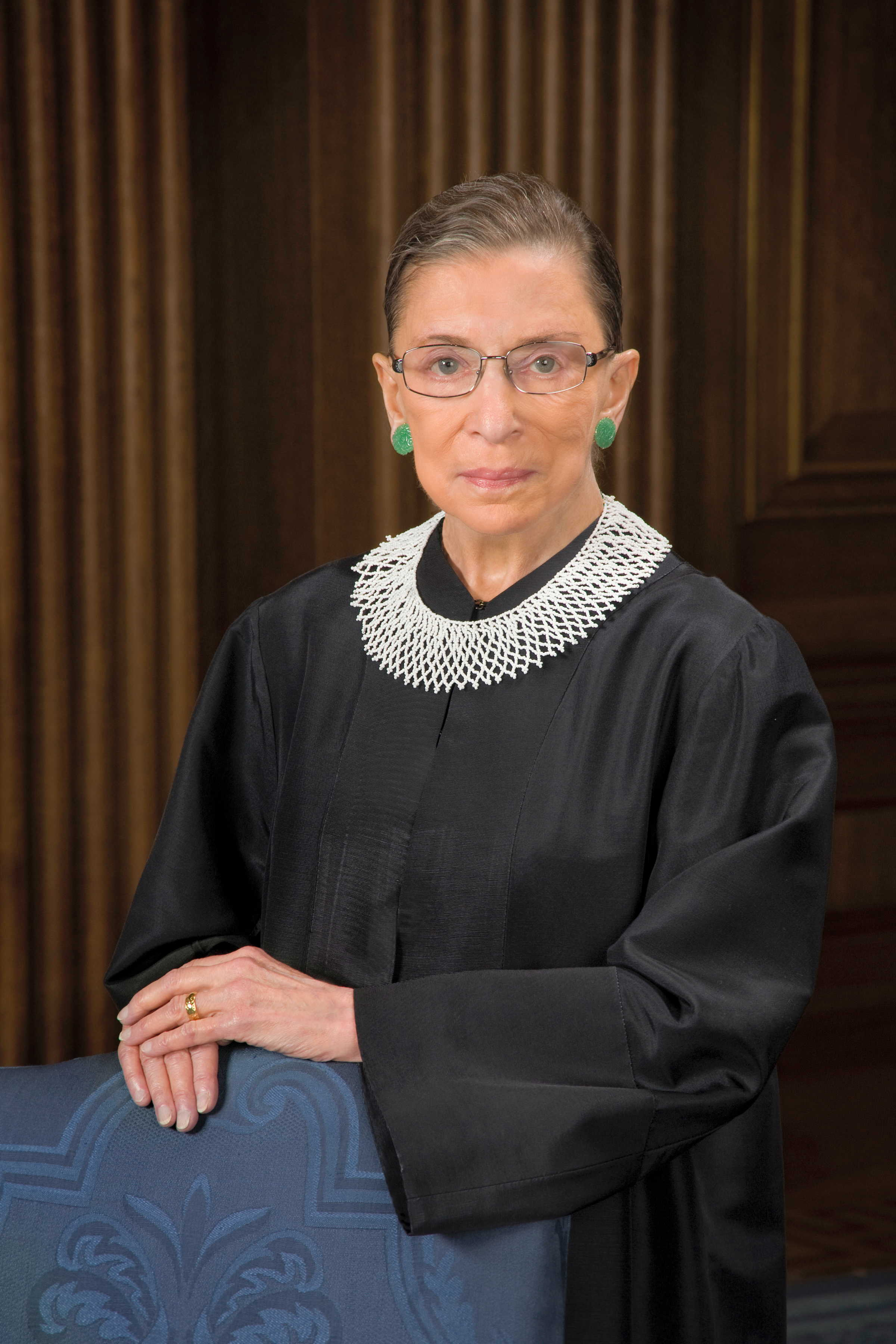

Ruth Bader Ginsburg 2019 term statistics

6	Majority or plurality	1	Concurrence	1	Other
7	Dissent	0	Concurrence/dissent	Total =	15
Bench opinions = 15		Opinions relating to orders = 0		In-chambers opinions = 0
Unanimous opinions: 3		Most joined by: Kagan (10)		Least joined by: Alito (4 in full, 1 in part)

Type	Case	Citation	Issues	Joined by	Other opinions
	Thompson v. Hebdon	589 U.S. ___ (2019)			per curiam
	Rotkiske v. Klemm	589 U.S. ___ (2019)			Thomas; Sotomayor
	Ritzen Group, Inc. v. Jackson Masonry, LLC	589 U.S. ___ (2020)		Unanimous	
	Monasky v. Taglieri	589 U.S. ___ (2020)	International Child Abduction Remedies Act • habitual residence of child	Roberts, Breyer, Sotomayor, Kagan, Gorsuch, Kavanaugh; Thomas (in part)	Thomas; Alito
	Hernandez v. Mesa	589 U.S. ___ (2020)	Fourth Amendment • Fifth Amendment • cross-border shooting by federal agent	Breyer, Sotomayor, Kagan	Alito; Thomas
	McKinney v. Arizona	589 U.S. ___ (2020)	Eighth Amendment • death penalty • Sixth Amendment • right to jury determination of facts • reweighing of aggravating and mitigating circumstances by appellate court • retroactivity of constitutional rules on collateral or direct reviews	Breyer, Sotomayor, Kagan	Kavanaugh
	Shular v. United States	589 U.S. ___ (2020)	Armed Career Criminal Act • definition of serious drug offense	Unanimous	Kavanaugh
	Comcast Corp. v. National Assn. of African-American Owned Media	589 U.S. ___ (2020)	Civil Rights Act of 1866 • race as but-for causation		Gorsuch
	Republican National Committee v. Democratic National Committee	589 U.S. ___ (2020)	2019–20 coronavirus pandemic • extension of absentee ballot deadlines due to public health crisis	Breyer, Sotomayor, Kagan	per curiam
Ginsburg dissented from the Court's grant of application for stay.
	Thryv, Inc. v. Click-To-Call Technologies, LP	590 U.S. ___ (2020)	patent law • inter partes review	Roberts, Breyer, Kagan, Kavanaugh; Thomas, Alito (in part)	Gorsuch
	Georgia v. Public.Resource.Org, Inc.	590 U.S. ___ (2020)	copyright law • government edicts doctrine • copyrightability of annotated legislative code	Breyer	Roberts; Thomas
	United States v. Sineneng-Smith	590 U.S. ___ (2020)	party presentation principle • First Amendment • overbreadth doctrine • induced violation for profit of immigration law	Unanimous	Thomas
	Espinoza v. Montana Dept. of Revenue	591 U.S. ___ (2020)	state law prohibition on government aid to religious schools • First Amendment • Free Exercise Clause	Kagan	Roberts; Thomas; Alito; Gorsuch; Breyer; Sotomayor
	Patent and Trademark Office v. Booking.com B. V.	591 U.S. ___ (2020)	trademark law • eligibility of generic term combined with domain name for protection	Roberts, Thomas, Alito, Sotomayor, Kagan, Gorsuch, Kavanaugh	Sotomayor; Breyer
	Little Sisters of the Poor Saints Peter and Paul Home v. Pennsylvania	591 U.S. ___ (2020)	Patient Protection and Affordable Care Act of 2010 • religious and moral exemptions from contraceptive mandate • Administrative Procedure Act • Religious Freedom Restoration Act of 1993	Sotomayor	Thomas; Alito; Kagan
