= 2019 term United States Supreme Court opinions of Elena Kagan =

The 2019 term of the Supreme Court of the United States began October 7, 2019, and concluded October 4, 2020. This was the tenth term of Associate Justice Elena Kagan's tenure on the Court.
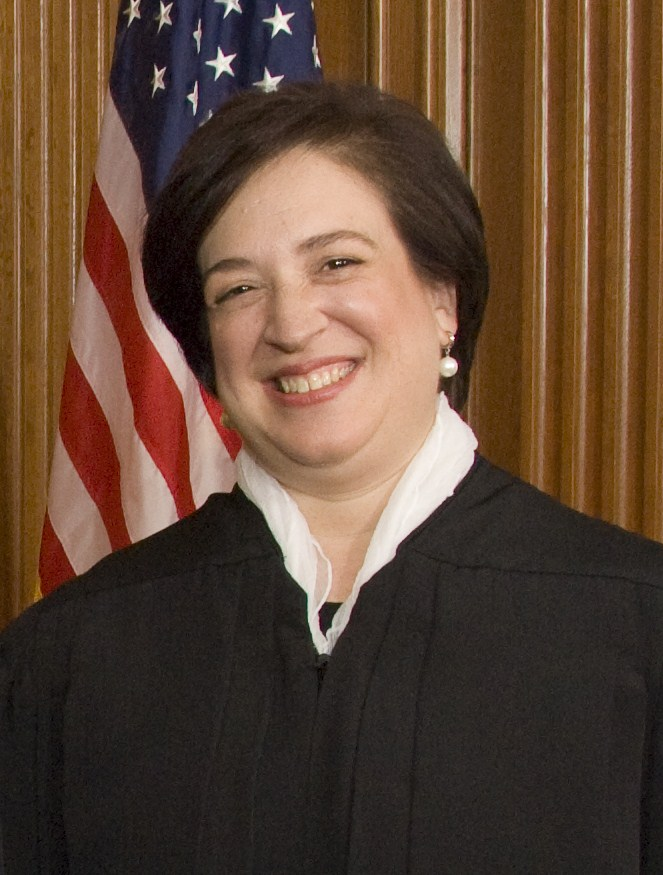

Elena Kagan 2019 term statistics

6	Majority or plurality	3	Concurrence	0	Other
0	Dissent	1	Concurrence/dissent	Total =	10
Bench opinions = 10		Opinions relating to orders = 0		In-chambers opinions = 0
Unanimous opinions: 1		Most joined by: Ginsburg (7)		Least joined by: Thomas (2 in full, 2 in part)

Type	Case	Citation	Issues	Joined by	Other opinions
	Retirement Plans Comm. of IBM v. Jander	589 U.S. ___ (2020)	ERISA	Ginsburg	per curiam; Gorsuch
	Allen v. Cooper	589 U.S. ___ (2020)	copyright law • Intellectual Property Clause • Fourteenth Amendment • Copyright Remedy Clarification Act of 1990 • state sovereign immunity from infringement claims	Roberts, Alito, Sotomayor, Gorsuch, Kavanaugh; Thomas (in part)	Thomas; Breyer
	Kahler v. Kansas	589 U.S. ___ (2020)	Fourteenth Amendment • Due Process Clause • insanity defense	Roberts, Thomas, Alito, Gorsuch, Kavanaugh	Breyer
	Kansas v. Glover	589 U.S. ___ (2020)	Fourth Amendment • investigative traffic stop due to revoked license	Ginsburg	Thomas; Sotomayor
	Kelly v. United States	590 U.S. ___ (2020)		Unanimous	
	Banister v. Davis	590 U.S. ___ (2020)	Federal Rules of Civil Procedure • motion to amend judgment • Antiterrorism and Effective Death Penalty Act of 1996	Roberts, Ginsburg, Breyer, Sotomayor, Gorsuch, Kavanaugh	Alito
	Lomax v. Ortiz-Marquez	590 U.S. ___ (2020)	immigration law • Convention Against Torture • factual challenge to removal order	Roberts, Ginsburg, Breyer, Alito, Sotomayor, Gorsuch, Kavanaugh; Thomas (in part)	
	Seila Law LLC v. Consumer Financial Protection Bureau	591 U.S. ___ (2020)	Dodd-Frank Wall Street Reform and Consumer Protection Act • limitations on removal of Consumer Financial Protection Bureau director • Article II • separation of powers	Ginsburg, Breyer, Sotomayor	Roberts; Thomas
	Chiafalo v. Washington	591 U.S. ___ (2020)	Article II • Electoral College • state law penalty for faithless electors • Twelfth Amendment	Roberts, Ginsburg, Breyer, Alito, Sotomayor, Gorsuch, Kavanaugh	Thomas
	Little Sisters of the Poor Saints Peter and Paul Home v. Pennsylvania	591 U.S. ___ (2020)	Patient Protection and Affordable Care Act of 2010 • religious and moral exemptions from contraceptive mandate • Administrative Procedure Act • Religious Freedom Restoration Act of 1993	Breyer	Thomas; Alito; Ginsburg
