= 2019 term United States Supreme Court opinions of John Roberts =

The 2019 term of the Supreme Court of the United States began October 7, 2019, and concluded October 4, 2020. This was the fifteenth term of Chief Justice John Roberts's tenure on the Court.
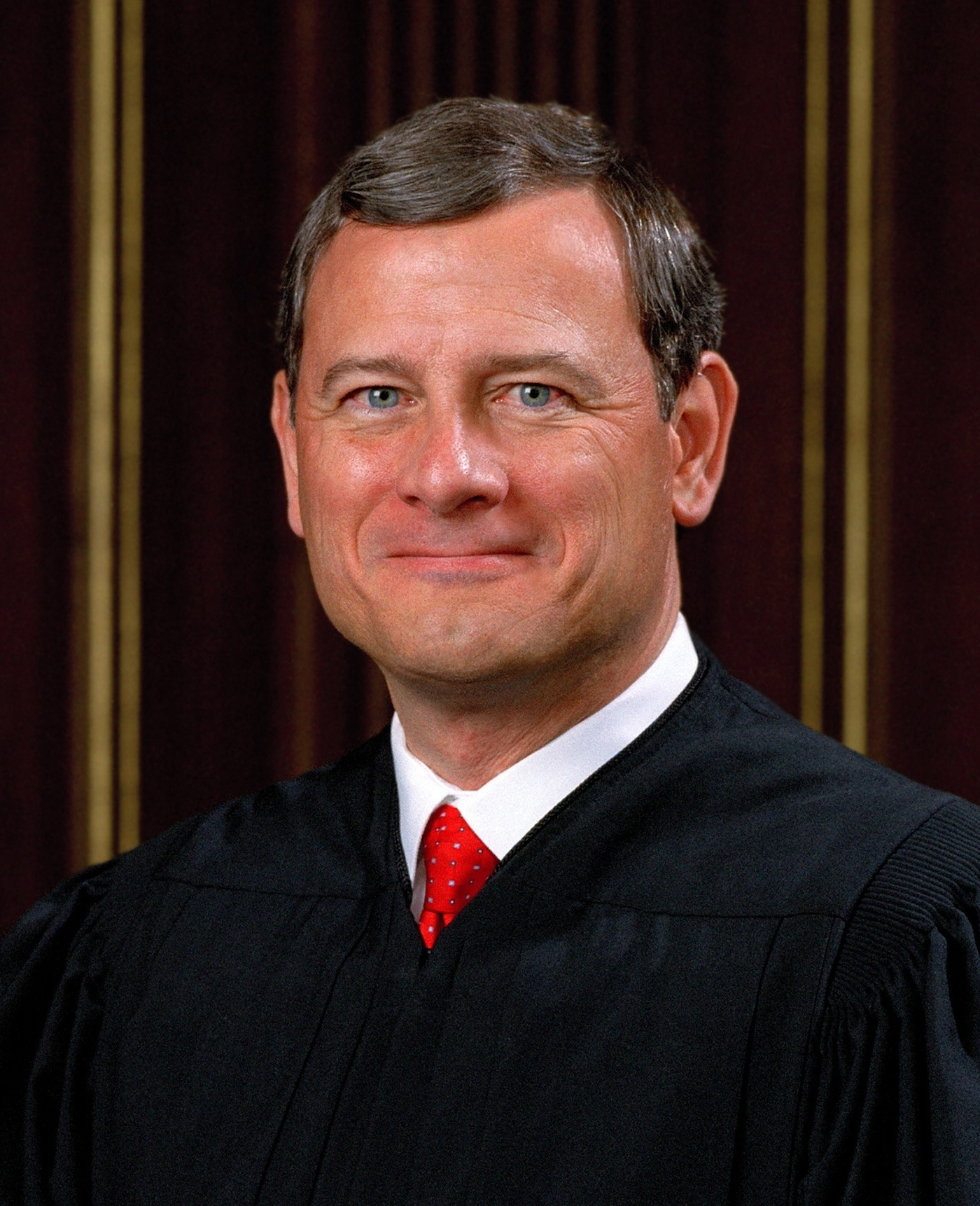

John Roberts 2019 term statistics

7	Majority or plurality	3	Concurrence	0	Other
1	Dissent	0	Concurrence/dissent	Total =	11
Bench opinions = 9		Opinions relating to orders = 2		In-chambers opinions = 0
Unanimous opinions: 0		Most joined by: Kavanaugh (7)		Least joined by: Thomas (1 in full, 3 in part)

Type	Case	Citation	Issues	Joined by	Other opinions
	Atlantic Richfield Co. v. Christian	590 U.S. ___ (2020)	Comprehensive Environmental Response, Compensation, and Liability Act • state law claims • potentially responsible parties	Ginsburg, Breyer, Sotomayor, Kagan, Kavanaugh; Thomas, Alito, Gorsuch (in part)	Alito; Gorsuch
	Georgia v. Public.Resource.Org, Inc.	590 U.S. ___ (2020)	copyright law • government edicts doctrine • copyrightability of annotated legislative code	Sotomayor, Kagan, Gorsuch, Kavanaugh	Thomas; Ginsburg
	South Bay United Pentecostal Church v. Newsom	590 U.S. ___ (2020)	First Amendment • Free Exercise Clause • state public health orders in response to COVID-19 pandemic • impact of restrictions on religious services		Kavanaugh
Roberts concurred in the Court's denial of application for injunctive relief.
	Department of Homeland Security v. Regents of Univ. of Cal.	591 U.S. ___ (2020)	Deferred Action for Childhood Arrivals • Administrative Procedure Act	Ginsburg, Breyer, Kagan; Sotomayor (in part)	Thomas; Alito; Sotomayor; Kavanaugh
	Seila Law LLC v. Consumer Financial Protection Bureau	591 U.S. ___ (2020)	Dodd-Frank Wall Street Reform and Consumer Protection Act • limitations on removal of Consumer Financial Protection Bureau director • Article Two • separation of powers	Alito, Kavanaugh; Thomas, Gorsuch (in part)	Thomas; Kagan
	June Medical Services, LLC v. Russo	591 U.S. ___ (2020)	abortion laws • requirement that abortion clinic doctors have hospital admitting privileges • Fourteenth Amendment • stare decisis • third-party standing		Breyer; Thomas; Alito; Gorsuch; Kavanaugh
	Espinoza v. Montana Dept. of Revenue	591 U.S. ___ (2020)	state law prohibition on government aid to religious schools • First Amendment • Free Exercise Clause	Thomas, Alito, Gorsuch, Kavanaugh	Thomas; Alito; Gorsuch; Ginsburg; Breyer; Sotomayor
	Trump v. Vance	591 U.S. ___ (2020)	Article II • Supremacy Clause • issuance of state criminal subpoena to sitting president	Ginsburg, Breyer, Sotomayor, Kagan	Kavanaugh; Thomas; Alito
	Trump v. Mazars USA, LLP	591 U.S. ___ (2020)	issuance of congressional subpoena to sitting president • separation of powers	Ginsburg, Breyer, Sotomayor, Kagan, Gorsuch, Kavanaugh	Thomas; Alito
	McGirt v. Oklahoma	591 U.S. ___ (2020)	Major Crimes Act • status of Creek Reservation • Oklahoma Enabling Act	Alito, Kavanaugh; Thomas (in part)	Gorsuch; Thomas
	Little v. Reclaim Idaho	591 U.S. ___ (2020)		Alito, Gorsuch, Kavanaugh	Sotomayor
Roberts concurred in the Court's grant of application for stay.
