= List of United States Supreme Court cases, volume 591 =

This is a list of all the United States Supreme Court cases from volume 591 of the United States Reports:

Case name	Docket no.	Date decided
Department of Homeland Security v. Regents of the University of California	591 U.S. 1	June 18, 2020
The decision on the part of the Department of Homeland Security to rescind the Deferred Action for Childhood Arrivals (DACA) was "arbitrary and capricious" in violation of the Administrative Procedure Act.
Liu v. Securities and Exchange Commission	591 U.S. 71	June 22, 2020
A disgorgement award that does not exceed a wrongdoer's net profits and is awarded for victims is equitable relief permissible under 15 U.S.C. § 78u(d)(5).
Department of Homeland Security v. Thuraissigiam	591 U.S. 103	June 25, 2020
The limits set by the Illegal Immigration Reform and Immigrant Responsibility Act of 1996 on review that a federal court may conduct on a petition for a writ of habeas corpus under 8 U.S.C. § 1252(e)(2) does not violate the Suspension Clause.
Seila Law v. Consumer Financial Protection Bureau	591 U.S. 197	June 29, 2020
The CFPB's leadership by a single individual removable only for inefficiency, neglect, or malfeasance violates the separation of powers.
June Medical Services L. L. C. v. Russo	591 U.S. 299	June 29, 2020
The Louisiana law requiring abortion doctors to have admitting privileges at a hospital within 30 miles of the clinic imposes an undue burden on a woman's right to obtain an abortion.
Agency for International Development v. Alliance for Open Society	591 U.S. 430	June 29, 2020
Because plaintiffs' foreign affiliates possess no First Amendment rights, applying the Policy Requirement to them is not unconstitutional.
Espinoza v. Montana Dept. of Revenue	591 U.S. 464	June 30, 2020
The application of the no-aid provision discriminated against religious schools and the families whose children attend or hope to attend them in violation of the Free Exercise Clause of the Federal Constitution.
Patent and Trademark Office v. Booking.com B. V.	591 U.S. 549	June 30, 2020
A term styled “generic.com” is a generic name for a class of goods or services only if the term has that meaning to consumers.
Chiafalo v. Washington	591 U.S. 578	July 6, 2020
A State may enforce an elector's pledge to support his party's nominee—and the state voters' choice—for President.
Barr v. American Association of Political Consultants, Inc.	591 U.S. 610	July 6, 2020
The 2015 government-debt exception of the Telephone Consumer Protection Act of 1991 violates the First Amendment.
Colorado Department of State v. Baca	591 U.S. 655	July 6, 2020
Judgment reversed in light of Chiafalo v. Washington.
Little Sisters of the Poor Saints Peter and Paul Home v. Pennsylvania	591 U.S. 657	July 8, 2020
The Departments had the authority under the ACA to promulgate the religious and moral exemptions. The rules promulgating the exemptions are free from procedural defects.
Our Lady of Guadalupe School v. Morrissey-Berru	591 U.S. 732	July 8, 2020
The First Amendment ministerial exception extends to the adjudication of Morrissey-Berru's and Biel's employment-discrimination claims.
Trump v. Vance	591 U.S. 786	July 9, 2020
Article II and the Supremacy Clause of the Constitution do not categorically preclude or require a heightened standard for the issuance of a state criminal subpoena to a sitting president.
Trump v. Mazars USA, LLP	591 U.S. 848	July 9, 2020
The courts below did not take adequate account of the significant separation of powers concerns implicated by congressional subpoenas for the President's information.
McGirt v. Oklahoma	591 U.S. 894	July 9, 2020
For Major Crimes Act purposes, land reserved for the Creek Nation since the 19th century remains "Indian country".
Sharp v. Murphy	591 U.S. 977	July 9, 2020
For Major Crimes Act purposes, land reserved for the Creek Nation since the 19th century remains Indian country.
Barr v. Lee	591 U.S. 979	July 14, 2020
Vacated a preliminary injunction delaying the execution of four federal prisoners. The plaintiffs did not establish that they were likely to succeed on the merits of their challenge to the use of pentobarbital in executions under the Eighth Amendment.

== See also ==
- List of United States Supreme Court cases by the Roberts Court
- 2019 term opinions of the Supreme Court of the United States
