= Monasky v. Taglieri =

- Supreme Court of the United States

Argued December 11, 2019 Decided February 25, 2020
- Full case name: Michelle Monasky v. Domenico Taglieri
- Docket no.: 18-935
- Citations: 589 U.S. 68 (more) 140 S. Ct. 719; 206 L. Ed. 2d 9
- Argument: Oral argument

Case history
- Prior: Motion for summary judgment denied, Taglieri v. Monasky, No. 1:15-cv-947, 2016 WL 8135530 (N.D. Ohio Jan. 25, 2016); judgment entered granting petition for removal, 2016 WL 10951269 (N.D. Ohio Sept. 14, 2016); affirmed, 876 F.3d 868 (6th Cir. 2017); on rehearing en banc, 907 F.3d 404 (6th Cir. 2018); cert. granted, 139 S. Ct. 2691 (2019).

Holding
- A child's "habitual residence" under the Hague Convention on the Civil Aspects of International Child Abduction should be determined based on the totality of the circumstances specific to the case, and should not be based on categorial requirements (e.g. such as an agreement between the parents).

Court membership
- Chief Justice John Roberts Associate Justices Clarence Thomas · Ruth Bader Ginsburg; Stephen Breyer · Samuel Alito; Sonia Sotomayor · Elena Kagan; Neil Gorsuch · Brett Kavanaugh

Case opinions
- Majority: Ginsburg, joined by Roberts, Breyer, Sotomayor, Kagan, Gorsuch, Kavanaugh; Thomas (Parts I, III, and IV)
- Concurrence: Thomas (in part and in the judgment)
- Concurrence: Alito (in part and in the judgment)

Laws applied
- Hague Convention on the Civil Aspects of International Child Abduction

Monasky v. Taglieri, 589 U.S. 68 (2020), is a United States Supreme Court case in which the court held that a child's "habitual residence" under the Hague Convention on the Civil Aspects of International Child Abduction should be determined based on the totality of the circumstances specific to the case, and should not be based on categorial requirements (e.g. such as an agreement between the parents).

This case is notable as the fourth case heard by the Supreme Court concerning the Hague Convention on the Civil Aspects of International Child Abduction. Previously, this case was only the second Hague International Child Abduction case heard en banc in history (by the entire panel of judges because of its exceptional public importance) by a US Court of Appeals.

Monasky was also the first case in which the United States Supreme Court substantively addressed the meaning of the definition of "habitual residence" as contemplated by The Hague Convention of 25 October 1980 on the Civil Aspects of International Child Abduction.

== Background ==
=== Case history ===
After Michelle Monasky and Domenico Taglieri met and married in the United States, they moved to Italy in 2013 due to Taglieri's employment. Monasky became pregnant in mid-2014 while her marriage was already experiencing difficulties, including alleged incidents of domestic violence against her (which continued through her pregnancy and afterward, she claims). Shortly before their daughter was born, Monasky informed Taglieri that she would not tolerate his abusive behavior any further and that she intended to return to the US with their child as soon as she was physically able. After yet another altercation between the spouses in late March 2015, Monasky went to the Italian police with her daughter and was placed in a domestic violence safe house. As soon as she was able to obtain a US passport for her daughter, Monasky left Italy with her daughter for Ohio.

=== Legal issues ===
There were two circuit-split issues presented in Monasky v. Taglieri: 1) whether the standard on appeal is the highly deferential “clear error” review (if habitual residence is seen as a truly and only a factual question) or “de novo” (if it is really a mixed question of law and fact, or otherwise an issue of “ultimate fact”); and,

2) whether the “shared parental intent” standard for determining an infant's habitual residence can be proven when the parents never agreed or had a meeting of the minds on where the infant should be raised.

== In lower courts ==
Taglieri petitioned an Italian court for custody of the child. In Monasky's absence, the court ruled in his favour. He then requested an order from a District Court that Monasky return the child to Italy, which was also granted. Monasky applied for stays from both the Sixth Circuit and Supreme Court, but when both were denied she complied.

A three-judge panel of the Sixth Circuit upheld the lower court's ruling, as did the full en banc Circuit.

== At the Supreme Court ==
The Supreme Court held oral arguments on December 11, 2019. Monasky was represented by Amir Tayrani, an attorney for Gibson, Dunn & Crutcher. Taglieri was represented by Andrew Pincus, an attorney for Mayer Brown.

=== Majority opinion ===
On February 25, 2020, the Supreme Court affirmed the ruling by the Sixth Circuit Court of Appeals. Writing for the court, Justice Ruth Bader Ginsburg noted that a child's "habitual residence" (as the term is used by the Hague Convention) should be determined by the totality of the circumstances specific to each individual case, not on categorical requirements such as an actual agreement between the parents. Ginsburg noted that the Hague Convention does not define "habitual residence" and that courts should conduct a fact-driven inquiry based on the unique circumstances of each case and common sense, which is how courts in other countries have enforced it. In addition, Ginsburg noted that Monasky's argument that an actual agreement between the parties was necessary to determine "habitual residence" was unpersuasive and would lead to problems in adjudicating custody cases. The majority opinion also held that the trial court's determination of habitual-residence is a mixed question of law and fact, and should be judged on appeal only by a clear error standard.

=== Concurrence ===
==== Thomas ====
Justice Clarence Thomas wrote an opinion concurring in part with the majority opinion and concurring with the judgment. He agreed with Ginsburg that an actual agreement is not necessary to determine habitual residence and agreed that the habitual-residence inquiry is fact-specific. However, he argues that the decision should be grounded firmly in the text of the treaty itself and that less weight should have been given to how other countries' courts have interpreted the term "habitual residence".

==== Alito ====
Justice Samuel Alito wrote an opinion concurring in part with the majority opinion and concurring with the judgment. Like Thomas, Alito agreed with Ginsburg that an actual agreement is not necessary to determine habitual residence and agreed that the habitual-residence inquiry is fact-specific. He also agreed with Thomas's opinion that the decision should be grounded in the text of the treaty and that the interpretations of the country's courts is not necessary. In addition, Alito argues that the question of "habitual residence" is not a pure question of fact and notes that the standard of review of appeal should be based on abuse of discretion, not clear error as was stated in the majority opinion.

== See also ==
- Hague Convention on the Civil Aspects of International Child Abduction
