= Kansas v. Garcia =

- Supreme Court of the United States

Argued October 16, 2019 Decided March 4, 2020
- Full case name: Kansas v. Ramiro Garcia, et al.
- Docket no.: 17-834
- Citations: 589 U.S. ___ (more) 140 S. Ct. 791; 206 L. Ed. 2d 146
- Argument: Oral argument

Case history
- Prior: Conviction affirmed, State v. Garcia, No. 112,502, 2016 WL 368054 (Kan. App. 2016); reversed, 306 Kan. 1113, 401 P.3d 588 (2017); cert. granted, 139 S. Ct. 1317 (2019).

Holding
- The Immigration Reform and Control Act of 1986 neither expressly nor impliedly preempts Kansas's application of its state identity-theft and fraud statutes to the noncitizens in this case.

Court membership
- Chief Justice John Roberts Associate Justices Clarence Thomas · Ruth Bader Ginsburg; Stephen Breyer · Samuel Alito; Sonia Sotomayor · Elena Kagan; Neil Gorsuch · Brett Kavanaugh

Case opinions
- Majority: Alito, joined by Roberts, Thomas, Gorsuch, Kavanaugh
- Concurrence: Thomas, joined by Gorsuch
- Concur/dissent: Breyer, joined by Ginsburg, Sotomayor, Kagan

Laws applied
- Immigration Reform and Control Act of 1986

Kansas v. Garcia, 589 U.S. ___ (2020), was a case of the United States Supreme Court that was decided, by a 5–4 majority, in 2020. The case concerned whether it was lawful for a State to enforce laws criminalizing the making of fraudulent representations by aliens who were not authorized to work in connection with obtaining a job; the Court held that it was.

== Background ==
In the United States, federal law makes it unlawful to employ an immigrant who lacks authorization to work. In order to ensure compliance with this law, employers must verify that their employees are authorized to work by having them complete Form I-9, which contains certain personal information. The form requires the prospective employee to attest under penalty of perjury to their authorization to work. Federal law prohibits the use of the I-9 for law enforcement purposes, with limited exceptions for certain federal crimes (for example, making a fraudulent representation on an I-9); for this reason, the States are preempted from using the I-9 in their own prosecutions or from independently criminalizing fraud upon the employment verification system.

Ramiro Garcia was stopped for speeding in Overland Park, Kansas. After questioning, the officers discovered that Garcia was already the target of an active investigation. Police requested a records check from his employer; among the documents provided was his I-9, which listed the Social Security number (SSN) of another person. Garcia had used this false number for other documentation, namely documents related to tax withholding, Form W-4 and the similar Form K-4 (used for Kansas's state income tax), and so was arrested for identity fraud, a State crime in Kansas. At trial, Garcia argued that his prosecution was barred by the Immigration Reform and Control Act (IRCA), which prohibits the use of the I-9 or any information contained therein for State prosecutions. Kansas did not rely upon his I-9 at trial, but on the other forms, which included much of the same information (such as a SSN); nonetheless, he argued that such usage was barred. Before the Supreme Court, the case was bundled with two other similar instances of purported identity fraud, involving Donaldo Morales and Guadalupe Ochoa-Lara, each involving both the Form I-9 and other documents.

=== Issue ===
Does the IRCA expressly or impliedly preempt states from using information provided on a federal Form I-9 in a prosecution of any person when the same information also appears in non-IRCA documents?

== Supreme Court opinion ==
The Court concluded unanimously that the IRCA had not expressly preempted Kansas's actions in these cases. The Court reached this conclusion by observing that the express preemption provision of the IRCA only prohibits a State from making it a crime for employers to hire an unauthorized alien; (Note: It also preempts regulation of those who "recruit or refer an unauthorized alien for employment.") the majority opinion points out that "laws that impose criminal or civil sanctions on employees" are not mentioned in the preemption provision. (Note: Emphasis added.) The Court split, 5–4, on the question of implied preemption.

=== Opinion of the court ===
The five-justice majority opinion, authored by Justice Alito and joined by Chief Justice Roberts and Justices Thomas, Gorsuch, and Kavanaugh, determined that the IRCA does not preempt the States, either expressly or impliedly, from applying identity theft or fraud statutes to non-citizens that had provided fraudulent information on both their I-9 and other forms, provided that the other forms, and not the I-9, formed the basis of the conviction. The majority addressed the two avenues for implied preemption presented by the Petitioners, field preemption and conflict preemption, but rejected both.

=== Dissent ===
Justice Breyer dissented from the majority on the question of implied preemption, joined by Justices Ginsburg, Sotomayor, and Kagan. In their view, the IRCA did implicitly preempt the State prosecutions at issue, because the IRCA sets out a comprehensive scheme for policing fraud in the field of an alien demonstrating their authorization to work. Given that these cases fall into this field, the dissent would hold that only the federal government, and not the States, would be able to prosecute any unlawful conduct that took place.
