= Kansas v. Glover =

- Supreme Court of the United States

Argued November 4, 2019 Decided April 6, 2020
- Full case name: Kansas v. Charles Glover
- Docket no.: 18-556
- Citations: 589 U.S. ___ (more) 140 S. Ct. 1183; 206 L. Ed. 2d 412

Case history
- Prior: Motion to suppress granted, Case no. 2016 TR 1431 (Douglas Cnty Dist. Ct. 2016); Reversed, No. 116,446 (54 Kan. App.2d 377; 400 P.3d 182 (Kan Ct. App. 2017)); Reversed, No. 116,446 (308 Kan. 590; 422 P.3d 64 (Kan. 2018)); Cert. granted, 139 S. Ct. 1445 (2019)
- Subsequent: Conviction affirmed on remand, 465 P.3d 165 (Kan. 2020)

Holding
- When the officer lacks information negating an inference that the owner is driving the vehicle, an investigative traffic stop made after running a vehicle’s license plate and learning that the registered owner’s driver’s license has been revoked is reasonable under the Fourth Amendment.

Court membership
- Chief Justice John Roberts Associate Justices Clarence Thomas · Ruth Bader Ginsburg; Stephen Breyer · Samuel Alito; Sonia Sotomayor · Elena Kagan; Neil Gorsuch · Brett Kavanaugh

Case opinions
- Majority: Thomas, joined by Roberts, Ginsburg, Breyer, Alito, Kagan, Gorsuch, Kavanaugh
- Concurrence: Kagan, joined by Ginsburg
- Dissent: Sotomayor

Laws applied
- U.S. Const. amend. IV

Kansas v. Glover, 589 U.S. 376 (2020), was a United States Supreme Court case in which the Court held when a police officer lacks information negating an inference that the owner is driving a vehicle, an investigative traffic stop made after running a vehicle's license plate and learning that the registered owner's driver's license has been revoked is reasonable under the Fourth Amendment.

== Background ==
In April 2016, Deputy Mark Mehrer of the Douglas County Sheriff's Office observed a truck on the road and made a routine check of its license plate. The check affirmed the truck was assigned to the license, but that the vehicle's owner, Charles Glover, had a revoked license. Mehrer proceeded to make a traffic stop on the assumption that Glover was driving the truck and with no additional information. The stop confirmed that the driver in fact was Glover. Mehrer cited him for driving with a revoked license and let Glover on his way.

Glover challenged the citation at the state's district court, asserting that the deputy lacked reasonable suspicion under the Fourth Amendment to the United States Constitution to assume he was driving the truck and sought to suppress that evidence. The district court agreed with Glover and suppressed the traffic stop. The state appealed, and the court of appeals had reversed, asserting there was a "common-sense inference" that Glover would likely be the driver of the vehicle he owned and thus making the traffic stop allowable. Glover appealed to the Kansas Supreme Court, which reversed again. While the Kansas Supreme Court recognized that the U.S. Supreme Court had established case law, such as in Terry v. Ohio that law officers may initiate warrant-less traffic stops when they have reasonable suspicion of a crime being committed, in the case of Glover's traffic stop, "The problem is not that the state necessarily needs significantly more evidence; it needs some more evidence". The Court stated the deputy made two incorrect assumptions, that Glover was likely the primary driver of the vehicle, and that those with suspended or revoked licenses would continue to drive regardless of the state of their license.

== Supreme Court ==
The state of Kansas petitioned the U.S. Supreme Court for a writ of certiorari, asking the Court to review the case. The Court accepted the case for review in April 2019.

Oral argument was held on November 4, 2019. The Justices considered the matters of common sense about ownership of vehicles as well as current and future driving habits that their decision may impact. They also were limited by the lack of details from Deputy Mehrer who at no point during the court proceedings had testified to his actions during the stop.

The Court's decision was issued on April 6, 2020. The 8–1 majority reversed the decision of the Kansas Supreme Court and remanded the case back to the state, ruling that the traffic stop against Glover was reasonable. Justice Clarence Thomas wrote the majority opinion which was joined by all except for Justice Sonia Sotomayor. Thomas wrote that Mehrer used common sense and made "an entirely reasonable inference that Glover was driving while his license was revoked". However, Thomas wrote that the Court's holding was narrow and further application should "takes into account the totality of the circumstances" as per Navarette v. California. Thomas wrote that it would have been inappropriate, for example, for a stop to be made if Mehrer had identified Glover from his license records as an older man, but from viewing the truck, saw a younger woman driving it. A concurrence by Justice Elena Kagan and joined by Ruth Bader Ginsburg agreed with this rationale and identified additional cases that would limit the applicability of the majority holding.

Sotomayor dissented, writing that "The majority today has paved the road to finding reasonable suspicion based on nothing more than a demographic profile."
