= Atlantic Richfield Co. v. Christian =

- Supreme Court of the United States

Decided April 20, 2020
- Full case name: Atlantic Richfield Co. v. Christian
- Docket no.: 17-1498
- Citations: 590 U.S. 1 (more)

Holding
- Landowners are "potentially responsible parties" under CERCLA and therefore need approval from the EPA before taking any action to restore their properties related to a Superfund site.

Court membership
- Chief Justice John Roberts Associate Justices Clarence Thomas · Ruth Bader Ginsburg; Stephen Breyer · Samuel Alito; Sonia Sotomayor · Elena Kagan; Neil Gorsuch · Brett Kavanaugh

Case opinions
- Majority: Roberts
- Concur/dissent: Alito
- Concur/dissent: Grosuch, joined by Thomas

Laws applied
- Comprehensive Environmental Response, Compensation, and Liability Act of 1980

Atlantic Richfield Co. v. Christian, 590 U.S. 1 (2020), was a United States Supreme Court case in which the court held that landowners are "potentially responsible parties" under CERCLA and therefore need approval from the EPA before taking any action to restore their properties related to a Superfund site.

== Background ==
For nearly a century, the Anaconda Copper Smelter in Butte, Montana contaminated an area of over 300 square miles with arsenic and lead. Since the 1980s, the United States Environmental Protection Agency worked with the current owner of the now-closed smelter, Atlantic Richfield Company, to implement a cleanup plan for a remediation expected to continue through 2025. A group of 98 landowners sued Atlantic Richfield in Montana state court for common law nuisance, trespass, and strict liability, seeking restoration damages, which Montana law requires to be spent on property rehabilitation. The landowners' proposed plan exceeded the measures found necessary to protect human health and the environment by EPA. The trial court granted summary judgment to the landowners on the issue of whether the Act precluded their restoration damages claim and allowed the lawsuit to continue. After granting a writ of supervisory control, the Montana Supreme Court affirmed, rejecting Atlantic Richfield’s argument that §113 stripped the Montana courts of jurisdiction over the landowners' claim and concluding that the landowners were not potentially responsible parties (or PRPs) prohibited from taking remedial action without EPA approval under §122(e)(6).
