= Thole v. U.S. Bank =

Thole v. U.S. Bank N.A.
- Supreme Court of the United States

Decided June 1, 2020
- Full case name: Thole et al. v. U.S. Bank N.A. et al.
- Docket no.: 17-1712
- Citations: 590 U.S. 538 (more)

Holding
- Participants in a defined-benefit retirement plan who are guaranteed a fixed payment each month regardless of the plan’s value or its fiduciaries' investment decisions lack Article III standing to bring a lawsuit against the fiduciaries under the Employee Retirement Income Security Act of 1974.

Court membership
- Chief Justice John Roberts Associate Justices Clarence Thomas · Ruth Bader Ginsburg; Stephen Breyer · Samuel Alito; Sonia Sotomayor · Elena Kagan; Neil Gorsuch · Brett Kavanaugh

Case opinions
- Majority: Kavanaugh
- Dissent: Sotomayor, joined by Ginsburg, Breyer, Kagan

Laws applied
- Employee Retirement Income Security Act of 1974

Thole v. U.S. Bank N.A., 590 U.S. 538 (2020), was a United States Supreme Court case in which the Court held that participants in a defined-benefit retirement plan who are guaranteed a fixed payment each month regardless of the plan’s value or its fiduciaries' investment decisions lack Article III standing to bring a lawsuit against the fiduciaries under the Employee Retirement Income Security Act of 1974.
