= Patent and Trademark Office v. Booking.com B. V. =

- Supreme Court of the United States

Argued May 4, 2020 Decided June 30, 2020
- Full case name: United States Patent and Trademark Office, et al. v. Booking.com B. V.
- Docket no.: 19-46
- Citations: 591 U.S. ___ (more) 140 S. Ct. 2298
- Argument: Oral argument

Case history
- Prior: Booking.com B.V. v. Matal, 278 F. Supp. 3d 891 (E.D. Va. 2017); Affirmed sub nom., Booking.com B. V. v. Patent and Trademark Office, 915 F.3d 171 (4th Cir. 2019); Cert. granted, 140 S. Ct. 489 (2019)

Holding
- A term styled “generic.com” is a generic name for a class of goods or services only if the term has that meaning to consumers.

Court membership
- Chief Justice John Roberts Associate Justices Clarence Thomas · Ruth Bader Ginsburg; Stephen Breyer · Samuel Alito; Sonia Sotomayor · Elena Kagan; Neil Gorsuch · Brett Kavanaugh

Case opinions
- Majority: Ginsburg, joined by Roberts, Thomas, Alito, Sotomayor, Kagan, Gorsuch, Kavanaugh
- Concurrence: Sotomayor
- Dissent: Breyer

Laws applied
- Lanham Act

Patent and Trademark Office v. Booking.com B. V., 591 U.S. ___ (2020), was a United States Supreme Court case dealing with the trademarkability of a generic terms appended with a top-level domain (TLD) specifier (in this case "Booking.com"). The Court ruled that such names can be trademarked unless the existing combination of term and TLD is considered to have a generic meaning to consumers.

== Background ==
Booking.com is an online travel agency, operating under both that name and at that domain name. The company sought to trademark its name with the United States Patent and Trademark Office (USPTO). The USPTO had denied the application: it ruled that the term "booking" as applied the class of travel services was a generic term, and that Booking.com had not shown how their mark had gained distinctiveness. Booking.com appealed to the Trademark Trial and Appeal Board (TTAB), which upheld that "booking" was a generic term within the class of travel services, and simply appending ".com" did not change its generic nature.

Booking.com appealed the TTAB decision to the United States District Court for the Eastern District of Virginia. There, the court reversed the TTAB's decision. The court found that while "booking" was a generic term related to arranging travel services, the addition of the top-level domain (TLD) of ".com", implying an online Internet commerce site, created a new concepts that was no longer generic. Further, the court agreed with evidence presented by Booking.com that the public recognized "Booking.com" as its brand through customer testimonials, including a "Teflon survey" of consumers in that market space where nearly 75% recognized "Booking.com" as a specific brand name for Booking.com's services. Additionally, the court recognized that with domain names being unique, this furthered the uniqueness of the trademark.

The USPTO appealed to the United States Court of Appeals for the Fourth Circuit, which in February 2019 upheld the District Court ruling in a 2-1 decision. A key issue raised on appeal was the consideration that the components of "booking.com" ("booking" and ".com") were both considered generic, but as the Fourth Circuit upheld, their combination was recognized by consumers as a unique service due to the online domain name, rather than a broad range of online booking services, as to align with the prior decision from the Supreme Court case Goodyear's India Rubber Glove Mfg. Co. v. Rubber Co., whereby simply adding "Company" to the end of a product name does not uniquely identify the company. The dissenting judge feared that the decision would allow larger companies that had better resources to perform "Teflon surveys" and other consumer recognition tests could win out smaller companies in trademark dispute cases simply because of the domain name addition.

== Supreme Court ==
The USPTO petitioned to the Supreme Court for review, which certified the case in November 2019. The oral arguments for the case on May 4, 2020, were the first ever to be held via teleconference for the Supreme Court as a result of the COVID-19 pandemic. The traditional oyez announcement was made at the start, though the words "draw near" were omitted. During the arguments, the Justices raised questions of how an Internet address trademark different from a street address or phone number trademark which are similarly unique and have been granted, as well as the impact if they reversed on how many trademarks would be invalidated.

The Court issued its ruling on June 30, 2020. The 8–1 decision affirmed the Fourth Circuit's decision, holding that "a term styled 'generic.com' is a generic name for a class of goods or services only if the term has that meaning to consumers." Justice Ruth Bader Ginsburg wrote for the majority, joined by all but Justice Stephen Breyer. The majority's decision emphasized the importance of the Lanham Act and consumer perception, as well as the uniqueness of domain names. Ginsburg wrote "According to the PTO, adding '.com' to a generic term—like adding 'Company'—can convey no source-identifying meaning. That premise is faulty, for only one entity can occupy a particular Internet domain name at a time, so a 'generic.com' term could convey to consumers an association with a particular website. Moreover, an unyielding legal rule that entirely disregards consumer perception is incompatible with a bedrock principle of the Lanham Act: The generic (or nongeneric) character of a particular term depends on its meaning to consumers, i.e., do consumers in fact perceive the term as the name of a class or, instead, as a term capable of distinguishing among members of the class." Ginsburg concluded from this "We have no cause to deny Booking.com the same benefits Congress accorded other marks qualifying as nongeneric."

In his dissent, Breyer wrote "By making such terms eligible for trademark protection, I fear that today's decision will lead to a proliferation of 'generic.com' marks, granting their owners a monopoly over a zone of useful, easy-to-remember domains."
