= Financial Oversight and Management Board for Puerto Rico v. Aurelius Investment, LLC =

Financial Oversight and Management Bd. for Puerto Rico v. Aurelius Investment, LLC
- Supreme Court of the United States

Argued October 15, 2019 Decided June 1, 2020
- Full case name: Financial Oversight and Management Board for Puerto Rico v. Aurelius Investment, LLC
- Docket no.: 18-1334
- Citations: 590 U.S. 448 (more) 140 S. Ct. 1649; 207 L. Ed. 2d 18

Case history
- Prior: Motion to dismiss denied, In re Fin. Oversight & Mgmt. Bd. for Puerto Rico, 318 F. Supp. 3d 537 (D.P.R. 2018); affirmed in part, reversed in part sub nom. Aurelius Inv., LLC v. Puerto Rico, 915 F.3d 838 (1st Cir. 2019); cert. granted, 139 S. Ct. 2735 (2019).

Holding
- All officers of the United States are subject to the Appointments Clause regardless of duty station. However, officers exercising primary local power are not officers "of the United States" and are not subject to the Appointments Clause.

Court membership
- Chief Justice John Roberts Associate Justices Clarence Thomas · Ruth Bader Ginsburg; Stephen Breyer · Samuel Alito; Sonia Sotomayor · Elena Kagan; Neil Gorsuch · Brett Kavanaugh

Case opinions
- Majority: Breyer, joined by Roberts, Ginsburg, Alito, Kagan, Gorsuch, and Kavanaugh
- Concurrence: Thomas (in judgment)
- Concurrence: Sotomayor (in judgment)

Laws applied
- U.S. Const. art. II, § 2, cl. 2 Puerto Rico Oversight, Management, and Economic Stability Act

Financial Oversight and Management Bd. for Puerto Rico v. Aurelius Investment, LLC, 590 U.S. 448 (2020), was a United States Supreme Court case in which the Court held that appointments to the Financial Oversight and Management Board for Puerto Rico are not subject to the restrictions in the Appointments Clause of the U.S. Constitution. The Court held that all officers of the United States are subject to the Appointments Clause even if their duties relate to Puerto Rico. However, the power they exercise must be primarily federal in nature for the Clause to apply. If the officer exercises powers primarily of a local nature, even if created by federal law, then the officer is not "of the United States" and is exempt from compliance with the Clause. As members of the Board are primarily concerned with the governance of Puerto Rico, even though their decisions have potentially nationwide consequences, their powers are primarily local in nature and need not be appointed in compliance with the Clause.

== Case background ==
In the years prior to 2014, Puerto Rico, a territory of the United States, had several economic issues, including a period of depression, that caused it to accrue a large amount of debt with creditors. U.S. law prevents the territory from declaring bankruptcy under Chapter 9 on its debt, an option normally afforded to other U.S. states and divisions. In February 2014, both Standard & Poor's and Moody's downgraded Puerto Rico's debt rating, causing some of their prior creditors' agreements to now require repayment in months rather than years. By this point, it was estimated that Puerto Rico had acquired more than US$72 billion in debt across some 165,000 creditors, and failure to pay off these agreements would have added additional billions to what the territory owed. The territory attempted to clear some of the debt by passing the Puerto Rico Public Corporation Debt Enforcement and Recovery Act, allowing public corporations like utilities to file for bankruptcy but this was ultimately ruled unallowed under the existing law via the Supreme Court case Puerto Rico v. Franklin California Tax-Free Trust as being too similar to Chapter 9 bankruptcy.

The inability of Puerto Rico to clear its debt led to the Puerto Rico Oversight, Management, and Economic Stability Act (PROMESA) in June 2016. PROMESA created a Fiscal Control Board (FCB), composed of seven members along with the Governor of Puerto Rico as its eighth, non-voting member. The FCB saw to help Puerto Rico restructure its debt to be able to pay off its creditors in a timely manner, develop a fiscal plan to support that payment schedule while meeting the necessary welfare and services of its residents, and otherwise help direct the fiscal responsibility of the territory. The Act also shielded Puerto Rico from any lawsuits from its creditors by imposing a moratorium period following the bill's passage to allow the FCB to establish a plan, and then afterwards, to have such cases heard in a special court, the District Court for the District of Puerto Rico, with cases to be overseen by Judge Laura Taylor Swain of the District Court for the Southern District of New York, who had been appointed by Chief Justice John Roberts. Of the seven members of the board, six were selected by the President of the United States from a list of recommendations from Congress based on previous ties to Puerto Rico businesses, and the seventh of the President's choosing. PROMESA did not require any affirmation of these appointments by the Senate.

As the FBC was formed and work began to establish a fiscal plan and debt restructuring, the initial deadline for which Puerto Rico could default on payments had passed and in May 2017, several creditors filed suit against the territory for failure to pay. The FCB issued its intent to have these cases heard in the special court established by PROMESA. The cases held at this court looked to significantly cut back how much Puerto Rico owed to its creditors. This was also impacted by Hurricane Maria that struck Puerto Rico in September 2017, causing an estimated US$139 billion in further costs for recovery, which impacted how much the territory could pay back to creditors under PROMESA. Unable to challenge the special venue, the creditors turned to challenge the validity of the core of PROMESA, arguing that the board of the FCB, as Presidential appointees, need to be affirmed through Senate approval as part of the Appropriations Clause, and thus were unconstitutional. Judge Swain rejected the creditors' arguments on the constitutionality of PROMESA, which created multiple appeals to the First Circuit Court of Appeals. In a combined ruling in February 2019, the First Circuit reversed the special court's findings and agreed with the creditors that the appointment of members to the FCB, while not to a federal position but established by a federal law, required Senate confirmation, and thus their appointments were unconstitutional. The First Circuit did not declare any past deals that the FCB to be nullified, asserting that even without appointment, the actions and deals of the members of the FCB remained valid under the de facto officer doctrine, and gave the U.S. administration 90 days to make the Senate to make the necessary confirmations before the effect of the Circuit decision took place to nullify the FCB's authority.

== Supreme Court ==
The FCB itself made an emergency petition to the Supreme Court to hear the case, as well as to extend the deadline due to delays in the reappointment process within the Senate; President Donald Trump had provided a new list of names by June but the Senate was several weeks out before they could begin confirmation hearings. The Supreme Court accepted the petition on June 20, 2019, scheduling to expedite the case in October. With the Supreme Court's acceptance of the case, the First Circuit agreed to extend the deadline for reappointments until the Supreme Court delivered its opinion on the case.

Oral arguments were held on October 15, 2019. Questions arose around the applicability of the Insular Cases, the First Circuit's opinion to leave the past FCB decisions in place under the de facto officer doctrine, and what impacts on Puerto Rico would occur based on multiple decision outcomes.

The Supreme Court issued its decision on June 1, 2020, unanimously reversing the First Circuit's decision and upholding the appointment of the FCB board without Senate confirmation. Justice Stephen G. Breyer wrote the majority opinion that was joined by all but two Justices. Breyer wrote that the FCB "is part of the local Puerto Rico government" with a range of duties and powers "backed by Puerto Rican, not federal, law", and thus negating the need for the board members to be confirmed via the Appointments Clause. Justice Clarence Thomas wrote an opinion that concurred in judgement but disagreed with how the majority concluded that the FCB's duties were primarily local, while Justice Sonia Sotomayor also wrote an opinion concurring in judgement but stated that she was "skeptical that the Constitution countenances this freewheeling exercise of control over a population that the federal government has explicitly agreed to recognize as operating under a government of their own choosing, pursuant to a constitution of their own choosing".
