= Romag Fasteners, Inc. v. Fossil, Inc. =

- Supreme Court of the United States

Argued January 14, 2020 Decided April 23, 2020
- Full case name: Romag Fasteners, Inc., Petitioner v. Fossil Group, Inc., fka Fossil, Inc., et al.
- Docket no.: 18-1233
- Citations: 590 U.S. 212 (more) 140 S. Ct. 1492; 206 L. Ed. 2d 672

Case history
- Prior: 29 F. Supp. 3d 85 (D. Conn. 2014); Affirmed, 817 F.3d 782 (Fed. Cir. 2016); Cert. granted, judgment vacated, 137 S. Ct. 1373 (2017); Vacated in part, 686 F. App'x 889 (Fed. Cir. 2017); On remand, 2018 WL 3918185 (D. Conn. Aug. 16, 2018); Appeal dismissed in part, 2019 WL 2677388 (Fed. Cir. Feb. 5, 2019); Cert. granted, 139 S. Ct. 2778 (2019).

Holding
- A plaintiff in a trademark infringement suit is not required to show that a defendant willfully infringed the plaintiff’s trademark as a precondition to a profits award.

Court membership
- Chief Justice John Roberts Associate Justices Clarence Thomas · Ruth Bader Ginsburg; Stephen Breyer · Samuel Alito; Sonia Sotomayor · Elena Kagan; Neil Gorsuch · Brett Kavanaugh

Case opinions
- Majority: Gorsuch, joined by unanimous
- Concurrence: Alito, joined by Breyer, Kagan
- Concurrence: Sotomayor (in judgement)

Laws applied
- Lanham Act

Romag Fasteners, Inc. v. Fossil, Inc., 590 U.S. 212 (2020), was a United States Supreme Court case related to trademark law under the Lanham Act. In the 9–0 decision on judgement, the Court ruled that a plaintiff in a trademark infringement lawsuit is not required to demonstrate that the defendant willfully infringed on their trademark to claim lost profit damages.

== Case background ==
Part of the American Fossil Group's business is their line of clothing accessories including handbags. In 2002, Fossil signed a deal with Romag fasteners to use their magnetic fasteners for their handbags, which were both under Romag's patent and had trademarked elements. Around 2010, Fossil's leadership discovered that their subcontracted Chinese manufacturer had stopped purchasing the Romag fasteners and instead were using imitation ones in Fossil's products. On notifying Romag, Romag sought and obtained a preliminary injunction from Fossil from selling the affected line of handbags just prior to "Black Friday" in November 2010 as they proceeded to file patent and trademark infringement charges against Fossil in the United States District Court for the District of Connecticut, as well as against Macy's, whom Fossil exclusively sold their handbags through.

A jury trial was held and a verdict reached by April 2014 in which Fossil was found to have infringed on both patent and trademark rights. Damages were initially awarded by the jury for patent royalties, and separate awards of US$156,000 for unjust enrichment and US$6.7 million for deterrence for trademark infringement, with the latter based on the profits Fossil had earned from sales of their handbags. On review by the district court, Judge Janet Bond Arterton determined that while the jury correctly found Fossil had violated Romag's trademarks, they had not willfully disregarded the trademark, and precising case law within the Second Circuit Court of Appeals required willful violation for awards on profit to be justified, and thus vacated that part of the jury's award.

Romag appealed to the Second Circuit Court of Appeals, arguing that the language of the Lanham Act did not require them to have shown Fossil to be willful of the trademark violation to obtain damages based on profits. This has been the subject of a number of cases in the federal court circuit since the Lanham Act had passed, and had created a body of split decisions. The Second Circuit reviewed both their own body of case law as well as from other Circuits and, in their decision in April 2016, upheld the District Court's ruling. Their decision came to interpretation of the provisions of the Lanham Act codified at 15 U.S.C. § 1117 of when "willful violation" of trademark, as codified at § 1125, could be subject to recovery by damages, considering amendments added to the law in 1999. While Romag had asserted that the 1999 amendments meant that both trademark infringement and trademark dilution were both covered by § 1117 and that they did not have to show any willful violation based on decisions from other Circuits, the Second Circuit relied on their own case history to determine that § 1117 only covered trademark dilution.

== Supreme Court ==
Romag petitioned their case to the Supreme Court in March 2019, asking them to review the question of whether demonstrating willful trademark infringement was a prerequisite for an award of profit under the Lanham Act. The Court granted certiorari in June 2019. Oral arguments were held on January 14, 2020. Court observers saw that most of the Justices appeared to favor Romag's arguments to the structure and intent of the current state of the Lanham Act, following the "principles of equity" that Congress would expect one to be able to recover damages from profit without having to show intent for trademark infringement just as they had intended for trademark dilution despite how the structure of the act was written to potentially exclude that. Due to this, these observers felt that the Court would reverse the lower courts ruling.

The Court's decision was issued on April 23, 2020, with all nine Justices concurring on the judgement to vacate the Second Circuit's decision and remand the case. The majority opinion was written by Justice Neil Gorsuch and joined by all but Justice Sonia Sotomayor, who wrote her own opinion that concurred with the judgement. Gorsuch's opinion focused on the particular language of the Lanham Act to show that a claim of "false or misleading" use of trademark does not require willfulness. Justice Samuel Alito wrote a concurring opinion joined by Justices Stephen Breyer and Elena Kagan that agreed with the majority's conclusion but said that willfulness is "not an absolute precondition" for a profits award but may be informative in awarding damages. In her own opinion, Justice Sotomayor cautioned on the reliance on the majority's use of the mens rea standards, as their decision could cause those truly unaware of infringement of trademark to be deemed willful, though agreed with the application in the specific case for Romag and Fossil.
