= Department of Homeland Security v. Thuraissigiam =

- Supreme Court of the United States

Argued March 2, 2020 Decided June 25, 2020
- Full case name: Department of Homeland Security, et al., petitioners v. Vijayakumar Thuraissigiam
- Docket no.: 19-161
- Citations: 591 U.S. 103 (more) 140 S. Ct. 1959
- Argument: Oral argument

Case history
- Prior: Motion to dismiss granted, Thuraissigiam v. United States Dep't of Homeland Sec., 287 F. Supp. 3d 1077 (S.D. Cal. 2018); reversed, 917 F.3d 1097 (9th Cir. 2019); cert. granted, 140 S. Ct. 427 (2019).

Holding
- The limits set by the Illegal Immigration Reform and Immigrant Responsibility Act of 1996 on review that a federal court may conduct on a petition for a writ of habeas corpus under 8 U.S.C. § 1252(e)(2) does not violate the Suspension Clause.

Court membership
- Chief Justice John Roberts Associate Justices Clarence Thomas · Ruth Bader Ginsburg; Stephen Breyer · Samuel Alito; Sonia Sotomayor · Elena Kagan; Neil Gorsuch · Brett Kavanaugh

Case opinions
- Majority: Alito, joined by Roberts, Thomas, Gorsuch, Kavanaugh
- Concurrence: Thomas
- Concurrence: Breyer (in judgment), joined by Ginsburg
- Dissent: Sotomayor, joined by Kagan

Laws applied
- U.S. Const. art. I Illegal Immigration Reform and Immigrant Responsibility Act of 1996

Department of Homeland Security v. Thuraissigiam, 591 U.S. 103 (2020), was a United States Supreme Court case involving whether the Illegal Immigration Reform and Immigrant Responsibility Act of 1996, which limits habeas corpus judicial review of the decisions of immigration officers, violates the Suspension Clause of Article One of the U.S. Constitution. In the 7–2 opinion, the Court ruled that the law does not violate the Suspension Clause.

The Department of Homeland Security placed Vijayakumar Thuraissigiam into "expedited removal" proceedings after Thuraissigiam was apprehended 25 yards (23 m) from the southern U.S. border after crossing it illegally. Thuraissigiam, a Tamil former resident of Sri Lanka, pled for asylum asserting that he fled his country to "escape torture, beatings, and likely death". An immigration officer did not find his fear of persecution credible, and an immigration judge agreed with the officer's findings.

Thuraissigiam, represented by the American Civil Liberties Union, then filed a petition for a writ of habeas corpus, which a U.S. district court dismissed for lack of jurisdiction because of a section in the Illegal Immigration Reform and Immigrant Responsibility Act of 1996 that limits the judicial review of decisions made by immigration officers. On appeal, the U.S. Court of Appeals for the Ninth Circuit reversed, holding the section of the Act was unconstitutional because it violated the Suspension Clause.

On June 25, 2020, the Supreme Court reversed the Ninth Circuit. In a majority opinion authored by Justice Samuel Alito, the Court found that Thuraissigiam's claim for habeas corpus, to seek additional administrative review of his asylum claim, was beyond the scope established for habeas corpus in the Constitution, to secure release from unlawful detention. The majority opinion further rejected the argument that the Due Process Clause of the Fifth Amendment also compels judicial review of Thuraissigiam's claim.

== Background ==
=== Suspension Clause ===
The Suspension Clause of Article One of the United States Constitution states that the writ of habeas corpus shall not be suspended except when a suspension may be required in cases of invasion or rebellion. In INS v. St. Cyr the court wrote that, at a minimum, the Suspension Clause "protects the writ as it existed in 1789".

=== Federal immigration statute ===
In 1996, Congress passed the Illegal Immigration Reform and Immigrant Responsibility Act, which designated certain undocumented immigrants as subject to "expedited removal". According to Linda Greenhouse, writing in The New York Times, expedited removal is intended for non-citizens "who are deemed inadmissable upon arrival". Non-citizens facing deportation are entitled to apply for refugee status, if they say they have a “credible fear of persecution or torture”, if returned home.

A single immigration officer will then make a determination as to whether the fear is credible. If he or she determines it is credible, a panel will hold a hearing to explore the immigrant's refugee claim, in detail. However, under the Illegal Immigration Reform and Immigrant Responsibility Act, if the single frontline officer's initial assessment is that the fear is not credible, there is no route of appeal. Specifically, the part of the act codified as 8 U.S.C. § 1252(e)(2) limits habeas corpus proceedings to the following determinations:

1. whether the petitioner is an alien,
2. whether the petitioner was ordered removed under such section, and
3. whether the petitioner can prove by a preponderance of the evidence that the petitioner is an alien lawfully admitted for permanent residence, has been admitted as a refugee, or has been granted asylum.

=== Lower court proceedings ===
The respondent, Vijayakumar Thuraissigiam, is a Sri Lankan national who entered the country in an unlawful manner, and was stopped 25 yards from the border without entry documents. The court took the case to decide whether §1252(e)(2) violates the Suspension Clause as applied to an "inadmissible alien who was apprehended almost immediately after illegally crossing the U.S. border and was placed into expedited removal proceedings". According to the American Civil Liberties Union, which represented Thuraissigiam in the Supreme Court, Thuraissigiam is a Tamil former resident of Sri Lanka, who fled from Sri Lanka in order to "escape torture, beatings, and likely death". An asylum officer interviewed Thuraissigiam and concluded that he lacked a "credible fear of persecution on a protected ground or a credible fear of torture".

After reviewing Thuraissigiam's case, an immigration judge agreed with the immigration officer's conclusions, and ordinarily, this would have been a final decision not subject to appeal. Nevertheless, Thuraissigiam filed a petition for a writ of habeas corpus in the U.S. District Court for the Southern District of California, which dismissed the petition for lack of jurisdiction under the Illegal Immigration Reform and Immigrant Responsibility Act, specifically §1252(e)(2). Thuraissigiam then appealed to the U.S. Court of Appeals for the Ninth Circuit, which reversed, holding that §1252(e)(2) was unconstitutional because it violated the Suspension Clause.

== Supreme Court ==
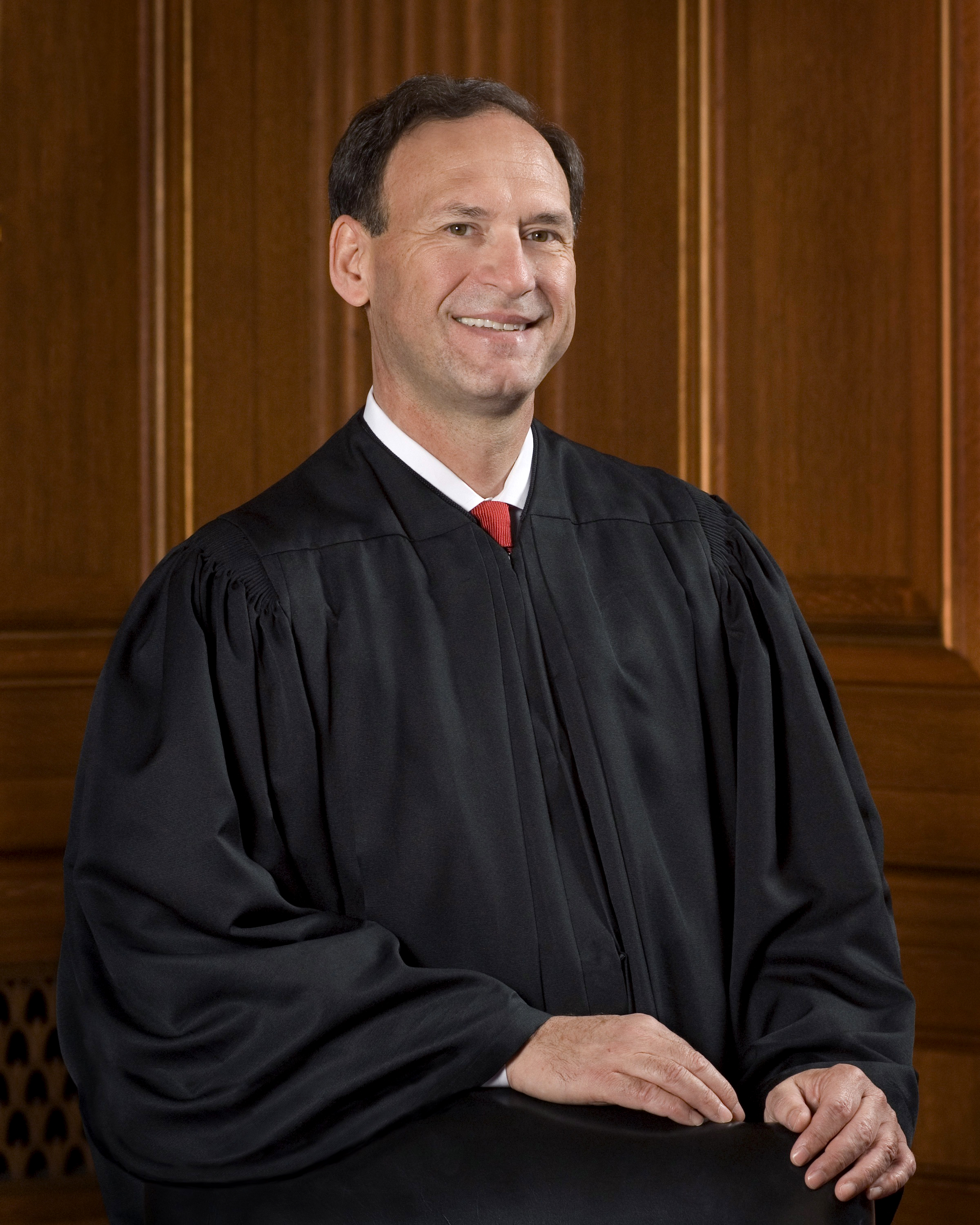
Justice Samuel Alito wrote the opinion of the U.S. Supreme Court in Department of Homeland Security v. Thuraissigiam

The Department of Homeland Security filed a petition for a writ of certiorari in the Supreme Court of the United States, which granted certiorari on October 18, 2019, in order to review "whether, as applied to respondent, Section 1252(e)(2) is unconstitutional under the Suspension Clause". Oral arguments were heard on March 2, 2020. The Court issued its decision on June 25, 2020.

The majority opinion was written by Justice Samuel Alito and joined by Chief Justice John Roberts and Justices Clarence Thomas, Neil Gorsuch and Brett Kavanaugh. Justice Stephen Breyer and Justice Ruth Bader Ginsburg wrote opinions concurring in the judgment. The 7-2 majority ruled that as under §1252(e)(2), the limits of review that a federal court may conduct on a petition for a writ of habeas corpus do not violate the Suspension Clause, reversing the Ninth Circuit's decision and remanding the case back for further review.

=== Opinion of the Court ===
Justice Alito writes that IIRIRA was enacted "for weeding out patently meritless claims and expeditiously removing the aliens making such claims from the country" because many asylum claims are made, few succeed, most are found to be meritless, and such abuse of the credible-fear process "can increase the burdens currently 'overwhelming our immigration system'". Alito wrote that the habeas corpus claim made by Thuraissigiam failed as "it would extend the writ of habeas corpus far beyond its scope 'when the Constitution was drafted and ratified' because "Habeas has traditionally been a means to secure release from unlawful detention, but respondent invokes the writ to achieve an entirely different end, namely, to obtain additional administrative review of his asylum claim and ultimately to obtain authorization to stay in this country."

Alito further addressed the claims of due process would only be extended to those "who have established connections in this country", as the 1892 case Nishimura Ekiu v. United States has ruled that aliens who have not been admitted do not have due process rights, and the Congress' power to restrict entry to the United States is plenary. The court said in Reno v. American-Arab Anti-Discrimination Committee that protecting executive discretion "can fairly be said to be the theme" of IIRIRA.

=== Concurrence and dissent ===
Justice Clarence Thomas wrote a concurring opinion "to address the original meaning of the Suspension Clause."

Justice Stephen Breyer wrote an opinion concurring only in the judgment, which was joined by Justice Ruth Bader Ginsburg. Breyer agreed with the majority opinion that the Suspension Clause was not violated in this specific case but would have ruled no further than that.

Justice Sonia Sotomayor wrote a dissent joined by Justice Elena Kagan. Sotomayor wrote that the majority opinion "handcuffs the Judiciary's ability to perform its constitutional duty to safeguard individual liberty and dismantles a critical component of the separation of powers" and that "It will leave significant exercises of executive discretion unchecked in the very circumstance where the writ's protections 'have been strongest'". The dissent says that "the Suspension Clause inquiry does not require a close (much less precise) factual match with historical habeas precedent". Sotomayor is critical of the majority's unyielding originalism, arguing that there are "inherent difficulties [in] a strict originalist approach in the habeas context because of, among other things, the dearth of reasoned habeas decisions at the founding."
