= June Medical Services, LLC v. Russo =

- Supreme Court of the United States

Argued March 4, 2020 Decided June 29, 2020
- Full case name: June Medical Services, LLC, et al. v. Stephen Russo, Interim Secretary, Louisiana Department of Health and Hospitals
- Docket no.: 18-1323
- Citations: 591 U.S. 299 (more) 2020 WL 3492640
- Argument: Oral argument
- Decision: Opinion

Case history
- Prior: Preliminary injunction granted, June Med. Servs. LLC v. Kliebert, 158 F. Supp. 3d 473 (M.D. La. 2016); Stay granted, 814 F.3d 319 (5th Cir. 2016); Stay vacated, 136 S. Ct. 1354 (2016); Permanent injunction granted, 250 F. Supp. 3d nfdco20170427e04 27 (M.D. La. 2017); Reversed, 905 F.3d 787 (5th Cir. 2018); Rehearing en banc denied, 913 F.3d 573 (5th Cir. 2019); Stay granted, 139 S. Ct. 663 (2019); Cert. granted, 140 S. Ct. 35 (2019).

Holding
- The Louisiana law requiring abortion doctors to have admitting privileges at a hospital within 30 miles of the clinic imposes an undue burden on a woman's right to obtain an abortion.

Court membership
- Chief Justice John Roberts Associate Justices Clarence Thomas · Ruth Bader Ginsburg; Stephen Breyer · Samuel Alito; Sonia Sotomayor · Elena Kagan; Neil Gorsuch · Brett Kavanaugh

Case opinions
- Plurality: Breyer, joined by Ginsburg, Sotomayor, Kagan
- Concurrence: Roberts (in judgment)
- Dissent: Thomas
- Dissent: Alito, joined by Gorsuch; Thomas (except Parts III–C and IV–F); Kavanaugh (Parts I, II, and III)
- Dissent: Gorsuch
- Dissent: Kavanaugh

Laws applied
- Louisiana Unsafe Abortion Protection Act
- Superseded by
- Dobbs v. Jackson Women's Health Organization (2022)

June Medical Services, LLC v. Russo, 591 U.S. 299 (2020), was a United States Supreme Court case in which the Court ruled that a Louisiana state law placing hospital-admission requirements on abortion clinics doctors was unconstitutional. The law mirrored a Texas state law that the Court found unconstitutional in 2016 in Whole Woman's Health v. Hellerstedt (WWH).

The Louisiana state law, as the Texas law, would have required doctors performing abortions to have admission privileges at a state-authorized hospital within 30 miles (48 km) of the abortion clinic. This law would have limited abortions to one single doctor in the state, as other doctors had not yet gained admission privileges or were outside the given range. The Texas law was declared unconstitutional in WWH in 2016, on the basis that limiting clinic availability was an undue burden on women seeking legal abortions, a constitutional right as determined by the landmark ruling Roe v. Wade (1973). The Louisiana law, however, had survived its challenge on appeal to the United States Court of Appeals for the Fifth Circuit, which ruled the law had fundamental differences from the Texas law based on the WWH ruling.

On June 29, 2020, the Supreme Court ruled in a 5–4 decision that the Louisiana law was unconstitutional, reversing the Fifth Circuit's decision. The Court's plurality opinion was written by Justice Stephen Breyer and joined by the three more liberal members of the Court, asserting that Louisiana's law was unconstitutional following from the same arguments that Texas's law had been in WWH and overruling the Fifth Circuit's reasoning. Chief Justice John Roberts joined them in the judgement but not in the opinion, upholding his position of dissent from WWH but deferring to a matter of precedent to support the judgement. The remaining four Justices submitted their own dissents upholding the law's constitutionality.

June Medical Services had been considered a potentially important case on abortion rights in the United States, as it was the first abortion-related case to be heard by both Justices Neil Gorsuch and Brett Kavanaugh, two justices that are considered conservative, giving the Court a conservative majority, and potentially threatening the Roe v. Wade precedent.

== Background ==
=== Before Whole Woman's Health v. Hellerstedt ===
Around 2013, several states including Texas had passed laws that, among other clauses, would require abortion doctors to have admission privileges at a hospital within 30 miles (48 km) of their abortion clinic, on the basis that if something went wrong with the abortion procedure, the patient can be rushed and treated at a nearby hospital. These safety standards, known as TRAP laws, formed the basis of the law, though at least one individual who helped craft it claimed his ultimate goal was to shut down abortion clinics. To have admission privileges, the doctor must effectively be an approved practitioner at that hospital. This can be a difficult process for a doctor, since hospitals expect admitting doctors to provide them with patients to be fiscally viable, and abortion doctors do not regularly provide such patients. In the case of Texas, its law Texas House Bill 2 (HB2), passed in mid-2013. By the time this part of the law came into effect in November 2013, only 19 of 42 abortion clinics remained open, leaving some women with their closest center more than 300 miles (480 km) away. Legal challenges from affected clinics were launched just prior to the November date. A first challenge ended in the Fifth Circuit which vacated a District Court's stay of enforcement with the Supreme Court declining to overrule, allowing the rule to come into effect. A second lawsuit on more focused terms and focusing on two specific clinics affected by the law was started in April 2014. This suit, finding similar resistance in the Fifth Circuit, eventually reached the Supreme Court as Whole Woman's Health v. Hellerstedt; the Court agreed to hear the case in November 2015, oral arguments in March 2016 (some weeks after the death of Justice Antonin Scalia), and decided in June 2016. The 5-3 decision found that, on the basis that the right to have an abortion is a constitutional right from Roe v. Wade, the Texas law requirement on admitting privileges at a nearby hospital created an undue burden for women who were seeking to have abortions.

While the cases related to Texas HB2 had started and after the Fifth Circuit had issued its first vacating towards the stay, Louisiana's state legislation introduced and passed Act 620 by June 2014 modeled off the Texas law. The law had been introduced by state senator Katrina Jackson, a Democrat with an anti-abortion stance who said her intent for the law was "to make sure that when a woman elects to have an abortion, while Roe vs. Wade is still the law, that they have safe choices." At that point, the state had six abortion clinics, and only one that would make the admitting privileges requirement by the September 2014 enforcement date. The five affected doctors attempted to secure admitting privileges before September but were denied, leading the clinics to seek a preliminary injunction to prevent the law from coming into effect. The challenge was heard in the Middle District Court of Louisiana by Judge John W. deGravelles, which granted the injunction. The state appealed this to the Fifth Circuit. The three-judge panel unanimously agreed to vacate the District Court's injunction, allowing Act 620 to in effect on February 15, 2016, which forced at least two clinics to immediately close. The clinics sought an emergency stay on the Fifth Circuit's decision from the Supreme Court, which granted the stay on March 5, 2016, halting enforcement and allowing the clinics to continue. The Supreme Court, which had just heard the oral arguments in WWH, stated that the courts should wait on its decision in WWH and rehear the case based on its outcome.

=== Aftermath ===
With the Supreme Court's stay on enforcement of Act 620 in place, the full case was heard before Judge deGravelles at the District Court. deGravelles found in favor of the plaintiffs in April 2017 and deeming Act 620 unconstitutional, applying the Supreme Court's "undue burden" tests from WWH similarly to Louisiana's laws in his 117-page opinion. deGravelles granted a permanent injunction on the state from enforcing Act 620. The state again appealed to the Fifth Circuit. In a 2-1 decision issued in September 2018, Judges Jerry Edwin Smith and Edith Brown Clement reversed the District Court's decision. In the majority opinion, the Fifth Circuit found that in applying the undue burden test, only about 30% of the women in the state would be affected by the law, and only due to longer waiting times to have the abortion procedure should one affected clinic close. The majority also found that in contrast to the Texas's admission privilege's requirements, Louisiana's were less strict, making it easier for those doctors to obtain it. Judge Patrick E. Higginbotham wrote in his dissent that in applying the undue burden test, the state shows no compelling medical benefit to override the right to an abortion.

The plaintiffs sought an en banc hearing from the full Fifth Circuit, but this request was denied, with Act 620 set to come into effect on February 4, 2019. The 5th circuit denied a rehearing by a vote of 9–6. Chief Judge Carl E. Stewart, and Judges James L. Dennis, Leslie H. Southwick, James E. Graves, Jr., Stephen A. Higginson, and Gregg Costa voted to rehear. Dennis wrote a 19-page dissent, which Higginbotham, Graves, and Higginson joined. Higginson wrote a 1-page dissent. Judges Jones, Smith, Owen, Elrod, Haynes, Willett, Ho, Engelhardt, and Oldham voted not to rehear. The plaintiffs issued a request to Supreme Court Justice Samuel Alito to issue an emergency stay on the law by January 29, 2019. The Supreme Court issued an order based on a 5–4 split to stay the enforcement of the act pending a full review of the plaintiff's petition and a full hearing in the Supreme Court, should they grant writ of certiorari. The majority included Chief Justice John Roberts (who had previously joined the dissent in WWH) along with the four liberal justices, Ruth Bader Ginsburg, Stephen Breyer, Sonia Sotomayor, and Elena Kagan. The dissenting justices were Alito, Clarence Thomas, Neil Gorsuch, and Brett Kavanaugh. Only Kavanaugh wrote an opinion alongside the order, stating that he believed that three of the doctors affected by the admitting privileges could still obtain these, and had not yet demonstrated it was impossible for them to get it, eliminating the undue burden on women. In addition to requesting an emergency stay on the Fifth Circuit's decision, the clinics also petitioned the Supreme Court to hear the case.

== Supreme Court ==
The Supreme Court of the United States granted certiorari in the case in October 2019, agreeing to review the ruling below. With the resignation of Rebekah Gee in January 2020, the case was renamed from June Medical Services, LLC v. Gee upon the appointment of the interim health secretary, Stephen Russo.

Oral arguments took place on March 4, 2020. Court observers said the court was split along the five conservative Justices that would uphold the Fifth Circuit's ruling and the four liberal ones, with Chief Justice John Roberts, typically conservative, likely to be the key vote with his intent unclear from the questions he had asked. Roberts had sided for the Texas law in WWH, but voted with the liberals to block the Louisiana law from going into effect. Court observers have stated that Roberts tends to side with conservative issues, but has also voted in cases to uphold the reputation of the Supreme Court.

The Court released its opinions on June 29, 2020.

=== Plurality opinion ===
In a 5–4 judgment, the Court ruled that the Louisiana law was unconstitutional, reversing the decision of the Fifth Circuit. The plurality opinion was written by Justice Stephen Breyer, and joined by Justices Ruth Bader Ginsburg, Sonia Sotomayor and Elena Kagan. In addition to their review of the commonality of the Louisiana law to the Texas law, Breyer wrote "The evidence also shows that opposition to abortion played a significant role in some hospitals' decisions to deny admitting privileges."

=== Roberts opinion concurring in the judgment ===
Chief Justice John Roberts joined with the judgment of the four, but not on their opinion. Roberts wrote that while he maintained his dissent against the majority opinion from WWH, he joined the majority judgement in this case out of respect for court precedent set by WWH. Roberts wrote "The Louisiana law imposes a burden on access to abortion just as severe as that imposed by the Texas law, for the same reasons. Therefore Louisiana's law cannot stand under our precedents."

=== Dissents ===
Separate dissents were written by Justices Clarence Thomas, Samuel Alito, Neil Gorsuch, and Brett Kavanaugh, with Thomas, Gorsuch, and Kavanaugh also joining parts on Alito's dissent. Thomas maintained in his dissent that Roe v. Wade "is grievously wrong for many reasons, but the most fundamental is that its core holding—that the Constitution protects a woman’s right to abort her unborn child—finds no support in the text of the Fourteenth Amendment." Alito wrote in his dissent that "the abortion right is used like a bulldozer to flatten legal rules that stand in the way." Gorsuch wrote that the Court should have given more deference to the state's rationale for passing the law, while Kavanaugh identified the need for more evidence to determine the potential impacts on abortion access should the law have been enforced.

== Impact ==
June Medical Services was the first abortion-related case to reach the court following the death of Justice Antonin Scalia and the retirement of Justice Anthony Kennedy, who have since been replaced by Justices Gorsuch and Kavanaugh, respectively. While Scalia had generally been against abortion rights, Kennedy had generally been favorable towards abortion rights, and was considered to have been the swing vote in WWH. Gorsuch and Kavanaugh, both nominated by President Donald Trump and considered to be conservative justices, gave the court a 5–4 conservative majority. Kavanaugh's judicial opinions before joining the Supreme Court and his comments during his nomination process indicated that he views abortion rights with disfavor. Kavanaugh's dissent from the Court's emergency order on February 7 raised concerns among Democrats and supporters of abortion rights. Chief Justice John Roberts had voted to uphold abortion regulations in previous cases.

While the Supreme Court's ruling overturned the Louisiana law and was considered a win for abortion advocates, concerns remained that abortion rights could still be changed by the Court in a future case considering the opinions given by Roberts, Gorsuch and Kavanaugh. In the case of Roberts, his decision to side with the liberal segment of the court was based on his commitment to staying with precedent, and abortion advocates stated concern that Roberts would have ruled against abortion rights in a case where stare decisis would not apply. In a footnote, Roberts expressed agreement with Justice Alito's view on dissent that "the validity of admitting privileges laws 'depend[s] on numerous factors that may differ from state to state,'" which could signal that he would uphold laws requiring admitting privileges in another state where some unspecified "factors" were different. On June 24, 2022, the Court overturned Roe and Casey in Dobbs v. Jackson Women's Health Organization, meaning that state restrictions on abortion providers are no longer subject to the undue burden standard.

== See also ==
- Roe v. Wade (1973)
- Planned Parenthood v. Casey (1992)
- Stenberg v. Carhart (2000)
- Gonzales v. Carhart (2007)
- Whole Woman's Health v. Hellerstedt (2016)
- Dobbs v. Jackson Women's Health Organization (2022)
- Hyde Amendment
- Abortion in the United States
