= 2019 term per curiam opinions of the Supreme Court of the United States =

The Supreme Court of the United States handed down ten per curiam opinions during its 2019 term, which began October 7, 2019 and concluded October 4, 2020.

Because per curiam decisions are issued from the Court as an institution, these opinions all lack the attribution of authorship or joining votes to specific justices. All justices on the Court at the time the decision was handed down are assumed to have participated and concurred unless otherwise noted.

== Court membership ==
Chief Justice: John Roberts

Associate Justices: Clarence Thomas, Ruth Bader Ginsburg (died September 18, 2020), Stephen Breyer, Samuel Alito, Sonia Sotomayor, Elena Kagan, Neil Gorsuch, Brett Kavanaugh

== Thompson v. Hebdon ==
- Full caption: David Thompson, et al., v. Heather Hebdon, Executive Director of the Alaska Public Offices Commission, et al.
- Citations: 589 U.S. ___
- Prior history: Judgment for defendants, sub nom. Thompson v. Dauphinais, 217 F. Supp. 3d 1023 (D. Alaska 2016); aff'd, 909 F.3d 1027 (9th Cir. 2018)
- Laws applied: U.S. Const. amend. I; Alaska Stat. § 15.13.070(b)(1) (2018)
- Full text of the opinion: official slip opinion · Oyez

589 U.S. ___
Decided November 25, 2019.
Ninth Circuit vacated and remanded to reexamine whether Alaska's political contribution limits were consistent with the Supreme Court's First Amendment case law.

Vacated and remanded to reexamine whether Alaska's political contribution limits were consistent with the Supreme Court's First Amendment case law.

Ginsburg filed a statement.

== Retirement Plans Comm. of IBM v. Jander ==
- Full caption: Retirement Plans Committee of IBM et al v. Larry W. Jander et al
- Citations: 589 U.S. ___
- Prior history: Motion to dismiss granted, Jander v. Ret. Plans Comm. of IBM, 272 F. Supp. 3d 444 (S.D.N.Y. 2017); reversed, 910 F.3d 620 (2d Cir. 2018); cert. granted, 139 S. Ct. 2667 (2019).
- Laws applied: ERISA
- Full text of the opinion: official slip opinion · Oyez

589 U.S. ___
Argued November 6, 2019.
Decided January 14, 2020.
Second Circuit vacated and remanded for consideration of arguments made for the first time in the Supreme Court briefing.

Kagan filed a concurrence, joined by Ginsburg. Gorsuch filed a concurrence.

== Roman Catholic Archdiocese of San Juan v. Acevedo Feliciano ==
- Full caption: Roman Catholic Archdiocese of San Juan de Puerto Rico v. Yali Acevedo Feliciano, et al.
- Citations: 589 U.S. 57
- Prior history: Preliminary injunction denied, Puerto Rico Court of First Instance; aff'd, Puerto Rico Court of Appeals; rev'd, Puerto Rico Supreme Court
- Full text of the opinion: official slip opinion · Justia

589 U.S. 57
Decided February 24, 2020.
A Puerto Rico trial court has no jurisdiction to issue payment and seizure orders after a pension benefits proceeding is removed to federal district court and before the proceeding is remanded back to the Puerto Rico court.

Supreme Court of Puerto Rico vacated and remanded.

Alito filed a concurrence, joined by Thomas.

== Davis v. United States ==
- Full caption: Charles Earl Davis v. United States
- Citations: 589 U.S. ___
- Prior history: Defendant convicted and sentenced, N.D. Tex.); aff'd, 769 Fed. Appx. 129 (5th Cir. 2019) (per curiam)
- Full text of the opinion: official slip opinion · Cornell

589 U.S. ___
Decided March 23, 2020.
Fifth Circuit vacated and remanded.

The text of Rule of Appellate Procedure 52(b) does not immunize factual errors from plain-error review, nor does Supreme Court precedent. There is no legal basis for the Fifth Circuit's practice of declining to review certain unpreserved factual arguments for plain error.

== Republican National Committee v. Democratic National Committee ==
- Full caption: Republican National Committee, et al. v. Democratic National Committee, et al.
- Citations: 589 U.S. ___
- Prior history: Preliminary injunction granted, 2020 WL 1638374 (W.D. Wis., Apr. 2, 2020); stay denied, 7th Cir., Apr. 3, 2020
- Full text of the opinion: official slip opinion · FindLaw

589 U.S. ___
Decided April 6, 2020.
Application for stay granted.

Stay granted of order by District Court for the Western District of Wisconsin, disallowing extension of the mail-in date for absentee ballots for the state's primary elections.

Ginsburg filed a dissent, joined by Breyer, Sotomayor, and Kagan.

== New York State Rifle & Pistol Association, Inc. v. City of New York ==
- Full caption: New York State Rifle & Pistol Association, Inc., et al. v. City of New York, New York, et al.
- Citations: 590 U.S. ___
- Prior history: Judgment for defendants, 86 F. Supp. 3d 249 (S.D.N.Y. 2015); aff'd, 883 F. 3d 45 (2nd Cir. 2018); cert. granted, 586 U.S. ___ (2019)
- Laws applied: U.S. Const. amend. II; 38 N.Y.C.R.R. § 5–2
- Full text of the opinion: official slip opinion · Oyez

590 U.S. ___
Argued December 2, 2019.
Decided April 27, 2020.
The Court determined the case had been rendered moot due to changes in the underlying law in question during its consideration at the Supreme Court.

Second Circuit vacated and remanded.

Kavanaugh filed a concurrence. Alito filed a dissent, joined by Gorsuch, and by Thomas in part.

== Andrus v. Texas ==
- Full caption: Terence Tramaine Andrus v. Texas
- Citations: 590 U.S. ___
- Prior history: Report and recommendation to grant petition in part; denied, sub nom. Ex parte Andrus, No. WR-84,438–01 (Tex. Crim. App. Feb. 13, 2019)
- Laws applied: U.S. Const. amend. VI
- Full text of the opinion: official slip opinion · FindLaw

590 U.S. ___
Decided June 15, 2020.
The Court held that the defendant's claims of ineffective assistance of counsel were inappropriately dismissed, as the state court failed to address the prejudice prong of the Strickland test.

Court of Criminal Appeals of Texas vacated and remanded.

Alito filed a dissent, joined by Thomas and Gorsuch.

== Barr v. Lee ==
- Full caption: William P. Barr, Attorney General, et al. v. Daniel Lewis Lee, et al.
- Citations: 591 U.S. ___
- Prior history: Preliminary injunction granted, No. 19-145, D.D.C., July 13, 2020
- Laws applied: U.S. Const. amend. VIII
- Full text of the opinion: official slip opinion · FindLaw

591 U.S. ___
Decided July 14, 2020.
District Court for the District Court of Columbia vacated.

Vacated a preliminary injunction delaying the execution of four federal prisoners. The plaintiffs did not establish that they were likely to succeed on the merits of their challenge to the use of pentobarbital in executions under the Eighth Amendment.

Breyer filed a dissent, joined by Ginsburg. Sotomayor filed a dissent, joined by Ginsburg and Kagan.

== See also ==
- List of United States Supreme Court cases, volume 589
- List of United States Supreme Court cases, volume 590
- List of United States Supreme Court cases, volume 591
