= 2019 term opinions of the Supreme Court of the United States =

October 2019 to October 2020 opinions

The 2019 term of the Supreme Court of the United States began October 7, 2019, and concluded October 4, 2020. The table below illustrates which opinion was filed by each justice in each case and which justices joined each opinion.

== Table key ==
Delivered the court's opinion

Joined the court's opinion

Filed a concurrence

Joined a concurrence

Filed a dissent

Joined a dissent

Filed a concurrence/dissent

Joined a concurrence/dissent

Filed a statement

Joined a statement

Did not participate in the decision
- Decisions that do not note an argument date were decided without oral argument. Decisions that do not note a justice delivering the court's opinion are per curiam.
- Multiple concurrences and dissents within a case are numbered, with joining votes numbered accordingly. Justices frequently join multiple opinions in a single case; each vote is subdivided accordingly.
- An asterisk ( * ) in the court's opinion denotes that it was only a majority in part or a plurality. An asterisk in a joining vote denotes that the justice joined it only in part.
- A dash ( - ) denotes that the justice voted without filing or joining an opinion.

== 2019 term opinions ==
| # | Case name and citation | Argued | Decided | Roberts | Thomas | Ginsburg | Breyer | Alito | Sotomayor | Kagan | Gorsuch | Kavanaugh |
|---|---|---|---|---|---|---|---|---|---|---|---|---|
| 1 | Thompson v. Hebdon, 589 U.S. ___ | | November 25, 2019 | | | | | | | | | |
| 2 | Rotkiske v. Klemm, 589 U.S. ___ | October 16, 2019 | December 10, 2019 | | | | | | | | | |
| 3 | Peter v. NantKwest, Inc., 589 U.S. ___ | October 7, 2019 | December 10, 2019 | | | | | | | | | |
| 4 | Ritzen Group, Inc. v. Jackson Masonry, LLC, 589 U.S. ___ | November 13, 2019 | January 14, 2020 | | | | | | | | | |
| 5 | Retirement Plans Comm. of IBM v. Jander, 589 U.S. ___ | November 6, 2019 | January 14, 2020 | | | 1 | | | | 1 | 2 | |
| 6 | Roman Catholic Archdiocese of San Juan v. Acevedo Feliciano, 589 U.S. ___ | | February 24, 2020 | | | | | | | | | |
| 7 | Monasky v. Taglieri, 589 U.S. ___ | December 11, 2019 | February 25, 2020 | | * / 1 | | | 2 | | | | |
| 8 | Hernandez v. Mesa, 589 U.S. ___ | November 12, 2019 | February 25, 2020 | | | | | | | | | |
| 9 | Rodriguez v. FDIC, 589 U.S. ___ | December 3, 2019 | February 25, 2020 | | | | | | | | | |
| 10 | McKinney v. Arizona, 589 U.S. ___ | December 11, 2019 | February 25, 2020 | | | | | | | | | |
| 11 | Shular v. United States, 589 U.S. ___ | January 21, 2020 | February 26, 2020 | | | | | | | | | |
| 12 | Holguin-Hernandez v. United States, 589 U.S. ___ | December 10, 2019 | February 26, 2020 | | | | | | | | | |
| 13 | Intel Corp. Investment Policy Comm. v. Sulyma, 589 U.S. ___ | December 4, 2019 | February 26, 2020 | | | | | | | | | |
| 14 | Kansas v. Garcia, 589 U.S. ___ | October 16, 2019 | March 3, 2020 | | | | | | | | | |
| 15 | Guerrero-Lasprilla v. Barr, 589 U.S. ___ | December 9, 2019 | March 23, 2020 | | | | | * | | | | |
| 16 | Allen v. Cooper, 589 U.S. ___ | November 5, 2019 | March 23, 2020 | | * / 1 | 2 | 2 | | | | | |
| 17 | Kahler v. Kansas, 589 U.S. ___ | October 7, 2019 | March 23, 2020 | | | | | | | | | |
| 18 | Comcast Corp. v. National Assn. of African-American Owned Media, 589 U.S. ___ | November 13, 2019 | March 23, 2020 | | | * | | | | | | |
| 19 | Davis v. United States, 589 U.S. ___ | | March 23, 2020 | | | | | | | | | |
| 20 | CITGO Asphalt Refining Co. v. Frescati Shipping Co., 589 U.S. ___ | November 5, 2019 | March 30, 2020 | | | | | | | | | |
| 21 | Kansas v. Glover, 589 U.S. ___ | November 4, 2019 | April 6, 2020 | | | | | | | | | |
| 22 | Babb v. Wilkie, 589 U.S. ___ | January 15, 2020 | April 6, 2020 | | | * | | | | | | |
| 23 | Republican National Committee v. Democratic National Committee, 589 U.S. ___ | | April 6, 2020 | | | | | | | | | |
| 24 | Atlantic Richfield Co. v. Christian, 590 U.S. ___ | December 3, 2019 | April 20, 2020 | | * / 2 | | | * / 1 | | | * / 2 | |
| 25 | Thryv, Inc. v. Click-To-Call Technologies, LP, 590 U.S. ___ | December 9, 2019 | April 20, 2020 | | * | | | * | * | | | |
| 26 | Ramos v. Louisiana, 590 U.S. ___ | October 7, 2019 | April 20, 2020 | | 1 | | | | * / 2 | * | * | * / 3 |
| 27 | County of Maui v. Hawaii Wildlife Fund, 590 U.S. ___ | November 6, 2019 | April 23, 2020 | | 1 | | | 2 | | | 1 | |
| 28 | Romag Fasteners, Inc. v. Fossil, Inc., 590 U.S. ___ | January 14, 2020 | April 23, 2020 | | | | 1 | 1 | 2 | 1 | | |
| 29 | Barton v. Barr, 590 U.S. ___ | November 4, 2019 | April 23, 2020 | | | | | | | | | |
| 30 | Georgia v. Public.Resource.Org, Inc., 590 U.S. ___ | December 2, 2019 | April 27, 2020 | | 1 | 2 | 1* / 2 | 1 | | | | |
| 31 | Maine Community Health Options v. United States, 590 U.S. ___ | December 10, 2019 | April 27, 2020 | | * | | | | | | * | |
| 32 | New York State Rifle & Pistol Assn., Inc. v. City of New York, 590 U.S. ___ | December 2, 2019 | April 27, 2020 | | * | | | | | | | |
| 33 | United States v. Sineneng-Smith, 590 U.S. ___ | February 25, 2020 | May 7, 2020 | | | | | | | | | |
| 34 | Kelly v. United States, 590 U.S. ___ | January 14, 2020 | May 7, 2020 | | | | | | | | | |
| 35 | Lucky Brand Dungarees, Inc. v. Marcel Fashions Group, Inc., 590 U.S. ___ | January 13, 2020 | May 14, 2020 | | | | | | | | | |
| 36 | Opati v. Republic of Sudan, 590 U.S. ___ | February 24, 2020 | May 18, 2020 | | | | | | | | | |
| 37 | GE Energy Power Conversion France SAS v. Outokumpu Stainless USA, LLC, 590 U.S. ___ | January 21, 2020 | June 1, 2020 | | | | | | | | | |
| 38 | Financial Oversight and Mngmt Bd. for Puerto Rico v. Aurelius Investment, LLC, 590 U.S. ___ | October 15, 2019 | June 1, 2020 | | 1 | | | | 2 | | | |
| 39 | Banister v. Davis, 590 U.S. ___ | December 4, 2019 | June 1, 2020 | | | | | | | | | |
| 40 | Thole v. U.S. Bank N.A., 590 U.S. ___ | January 13, 2020 | June 1, 2020 | | | | | | | | | |
| 41 | Nasrallah v. Barr, 590 U.S. ___ | March 2, 2020 | June 1, 2020 | | | | | | | | | |
| 42 | Lomax v. Ortiz-Marquez, 590 U.S. ___ | February 26, 2020 | June 8, 2020 | | * | | | | | | | |
| 43 | United States Forest Service v. Cowpasture River Preservation Assn., 590 U.S. ___ | February 24, 2020 | June 15, 2020 | | | * | | | | | | |
| 44 | Bostock v. Clayton County, 590 U.S. ___ | October 8, 2019 | June 15, 2020 | | 1 | | | 1 | | | | 2 |
| 45 | Andrus v. Texas, 590 U.S. ___ | | June 15, 2020 | | | | | | | | | |
| 46 | Department of Homeland Security v. Regents of Univ. of Cal., 591 U.S. ___ | November 12, 2019 | June 18, 2020 | * | 1 | | | 1 / 2 | * / 3 | | 1 | 4 |
| 47 | Liu v. SEC, 591 U.S. ___ | March 3, 2020 | June 22, 2020 | | | | | | | | | |
| 48 | Department of Homeland Security v. Thuraissigiam, 591 U.S. ___ | March 2, 2020 | June 25, 2020 | | 1 | 2 | 2 | | | | | |
| 49 | Seila Law v. Consumer Financial Protection Bureau, 591 U.S. ___ | March 3, 2020 | June 29, 2020 | * | * / 1 | 2 | 2 | | 2 | 2 | * / 1 | |
| 50 | June Medical Services, LLC v. Russo, 591 U.S. ___ | March 4, 2020 | June 29, 2020 | | 1 / 2* | | * | 2 | | | 2 / 3 | 2* / 4 |
| 51 | USAID v. Alliance for Open Society (2020), 591 U.S. ___ | May 5, 2020 | June 29, 2020 | | | | | | | | | |
| 52 | Espinoza v. Montana Department of Revenue, 591 U.S. ___ | January 22, 2020 | June 30, 2020 | | 1 | 1 | 2 | 2 | 3 | 1 / 2* | 1 / 3 | |
| 53 | Patent and Trademark Office v. Booking.com B. V., 591 U.S. ___ | May 4, 2020 | June 30, 2020 | | | | | | | | | |
| 54 | Chiafalo v. Washington, 591 U.S. ___ | May 13, 2020 | July 6, 2020 | | | | | | | | * | |
| 55 | Barr v. American Assn. of Political Consultants, Inc., 591 U.S. ___ | May 6, 2020 | July 6, 2020 | | * / 2* | 1 | 1 | | | 1 | 2 | * |
| 56 | Colorado Dept. of State v. Baca, 591 U.S. ___ | May 13, 2020 | July 6, 2020 | | - | | | | | | | |
| 57 | Little Sisters of the Poor Saints Peter and Paul Home v. Pennsylvania, 591 U.S. ___ | May 6, 2020 | July 8, 2020 | | | | 2 | 1 | | 2 | 1 | |
| 58 | Our Lady of Guadalupe School v. Morrissey-Berru, 591 U.S. ___ | May 11, 2020 | July 8, 2020 | | | | | | | | | |
| 59 | Trump v. Vance, 591 U.S. ___ | May 12, 2020 | July 9, 2020 | | 1 | | | 2 | | | | |
| 60 | Trump v. Mazars USA, LLP, 591 U.S. ___ | May 12, 2020 | July 9, 2020 | | 1 | | | 2 | | | | |
| 61 | McGirt v. Oklahoma, 591 U.S. ___ | May 11, 2020 | July 9, 2020 | 1 | 1* / 2 | | | 1 | | | | 1 |
| 62 | Sharp v. Murphy, 591 U.S. ___ | November 27, 2018 | July 9, 2020 | | - | | | - | | | | |
| 63 | Barr v. Lee, 591 U.S. ___ | | July 14, 2020 | | | 1 / 2 | 1 | | 2 | 2 | | |
| # | Case name and citation | Argued | Decided | Roberts | Thomas | Ginsburg | Breyer | Alito | Sotomayor | Kagan | Gorsuch | Kavanaugh |

== 2019 term membership and statistics ==
This was the fifteenth term of Chief Justice Roberts's tenure. Justice Ginsburg died on September 18, 2020, making it the second and final (and also the only full) term with the same membership.

| Justice | | Appointment history | | Agreement with judgment | | Opinions filed | | | | | |
| Seniority | Name | President | Date confirmed | % | # | | | | | | Total |
|---|---|---|---|---|---|---|---|---|---|---|---|
| Chief Justice | John Roberts | George W. Bush | September 29, 2005 | 96.8% | 61/63 | 7 | 1 | 0 | 1 | 0 | 9 |
| Associate Justice | Clarence Thomas | George H. W. Bush | October 15, 1991 | 68.3% | 43/63 | 5 | 13 | 2 | 11 | 0 | 31 |
| Associate Justice | Ruth Bader Ginsburg | Bill Clinton | August 10, 1993 | 74.6% | 47/63 | 6 | 1 | 0 | 7 | 1 | 15 |
| Associate Justice | Stephen Breyer | Bill Clinton | August 3, 1994 | 77.8% | 49/63 | 5 | 2 | 2 | 5 | 0 | 14 |
| Associate Justice | Samuel Alito | George W. Bush | January 31, 2006 | 71.4% | 45/63 | 6 | 6 | 2 | 10 | 0 | 24 |
| Associate Justice | Sonia Sotomayor | Barack Obama | August 6, 2009 | 71% | 44/62 | 5 | 8 | 1 | 8 | 0 | 22 |
| Associate Justice | Elena Kagan | Barack Obama | August 7, 2010 | 79% | 49/62 | 6 | 3 | 1 | 0 | 0 | 10 |
| Associate Justice | Neil Gorsuch | Donald Trump | April 7, 2017 | 85.5% | 53/62 | 7 | 2 | 2 | 2 | 0 | 13 |
| Associate Justice | Brett Kavanaugh | Donald Trump | October 6, 2018 | 93.5% | 58/62 | 6 | 5 | 1 | 2 | 0 | 14 |
| Notes on statistics: Opinion counts only include the bench opinions listed above; opinions relating to orders or in-chambers opinions are not included.; Agreement with the Court's judgment does not guarantee agreement with the reasoning expressed in its opinion. A justice is not considered in agreement if they dissented even in part. Agreement percentages are based only on the listed cases in which a justice participated and are rounded to the nearest one-tenth of one percentage point. | | | | | | Totals | | | | | |
| Notes on statistics: Opinion counts only include the bench opinions listed above; opinions relating to orders or in-chambers opinions are not included.; Agreement with the Court's judgment does not guarantee agreement with the reasoning expressed in its opinion. A justice is not considered in agreement if they dissented even in part. Agreement percentages are based only on the listed cases in which a justice participated and are rounded to the nearest one-tenth of one percentage point. | | | | | | 53 | 41 | 11 | 46 | 1 | 170 |
