= Patel v. Garland =

- Supreme Court of the United States

Argued December 6, 2021 Decided May 16, 2022
- Full case name: Pankajkumar S. Patel, et al. v. Merrick B. Garland, Attorney General
- Docket no.: 20-979
- Citations: 596 U.S. 328 (more)
- Argument: Oral argument

Holding
- Federal courts lack jurisdiction to review facts found as part of any judgment relating to the granting of discretionary relief in immigration proceedings enumerated under 8 U.S.C. § 1252(a)(2).

Court membership
- Chief Justice John Roberts Associate Justices Clarence Thomas · Stephen Breyer; Samuel Alito · Sonia Sotomayor; Elena Kagan · Neil Gorsuch; Brett Kavanaugh · Amy Coney Barrett

Case opinions
- Majority: Barrett, joined by Roberts, Thomas, Alito, Kavanaugh
- Dissent: Gorsuch, joined by Breyer, Sotomayor, Kagan

Laws applied
- Illegal Immigration Reform and Immigrant Responsibility Act of 1996

Patel v. Garland, 596 U.S. 328 (2022), was a United States Supreme Court case holding that federal courts lack jurisdiction to review factual findings underlying judgments related to discretionary relief in immigration proceedings under 8 U.S.C. § 1252(a)(2).

== Background ==
Pankajkumar Patel entered the United States illegally in February 1992. In August 2007, he applied for adjustment of status to receive a green card. In December 2008, while renewing his Georgia driver’s license, Patel checked a box indicating he was a U.S. citizen. An immigration judge later denied his application for adjustment of status on that basis, and the Board of Immigration Appeals (BIA) affirmed.

Patel argued that he would have been eligible for a driver’s license regardless of his citizenship status, so his error on the form should not affect his immigration application. He subsequently petitioned the United States Court of Appeals for the Eleventh Circuit for review of the BIA's decision, but a panel of the court held it lacked jurisdiction to review factual determinations. The Eleventh Circuit relied on 8 U.S.C. § 1252(a)(2)(B), which bars judicial review of “any judgment regarding the granting of relief” under 8 U.S.C. § 1255 (adjustment of status). The court of appeals held that factual findings about Patel’s credibility and intent in misrepresenting his citizenship each qualified as “a judgment regarding the granting of relief.” Both Patel and the government disagreed with this reading of the jurisdiction-stripping provision of the immigration code.

The Eleventh Circuit reheard the case en banc and again ruled against Patel, this time by an 11–4 vote. Patel filed a petition for a writ of certiorari. Certiorari was granted in the case on June 28, 2021.

== Supreme Court ==
On May 16, 2022, the Supreme Court affirmed the Eleventh Circuit in a 5–4 decision, with Justice Amy Coney Barrett writing for the majority and Justice Neil Gorsuch writing the dissent.

Because both Patel and the government opposed the Eleventh Circuit’s decision, the Court appointed Taylor Meehan as amicus curiae to defend the lower court’s judgment. Oral arguments were held on December 6, 2021.

=== Decision ===
Writing for the Court, Justice Barrett stated that federal courts play a limited role in the immigration system and that this role does not extend to reviewing factual findings underlying the denial of discretionary relief. The Court held that the term “judgment” in 8 U.S.C. § 1252(a)(2)(B)(i) encompasses any authoritative decision related to granting or denying discretionary relief, which “plainly includes factual findings.” The Court noted that Congress chose to give reduced procedural protections for discretionary relief.

The Court said its decision was based on its prior holdings in Guerrero-Lasprilla v. Barr and Nasrallah v. Barr. Specifically, in Guerrero-Lasprilla, the Court held that the jurisdiction-stripping provision did not extend to examining how a legal standard applies to undisputed facts, while noting that "appeals of factual determinations" would not be reviewable. Nasrallah v. Barr said non-citizens "may not bring a factual challenge to orders denying discretionary relief, including...adjustment of status". The Court rejected a theory that Kucana v. Holder, which limited the jurisdiction-stripping provision to determinations "made discretionary by statute", implied that review of nondiscretionary decisions is allowed.

=== Dissent ===
Justice Gorsuch’s dissent, joined by Justices Breyer, Kagan, and Sotomayor, stated:

Today, the Court holds that a federal bureaucracy can make an obvious factual error, one that will result in an individual’s removal from this country, and nothing can be done about it. No court may even hear the case. It is a bold claim promising dire consequences for countless lawful immigrants.

He argued that the term “regarding” should limit the phrase to the discretionary decision to grant relief, analogizing that in the phrase "any book regarding the history of the American West", the term "regarding" would narrow the phrase "any book" to the subset of books "regarding the history of the American West". He further argued the plain text of 8 U.S.C. § 1252 does not bar all judicial review. The jurisdictional bar of subparagraph (B)(i) applies to five forms of relief, not only §1255 (adjustment of status), but also inadmissibility waivers, cancellation of removal and voluntary departure, with different threshold requirements, so the bar was probably intended to apply only to the discretionary decision to grant relief.

== Impact ==
Commentators have cited the case as illustrating due process concerns and broader flaws in the immigration system, noting that Patel, a longtime U.S. resident, faced deportation without judicial review for a single checked box on a license application.

After Patel v. Garland, circuit courts considered whether hardship determinations in cancellation of removal cases constituted mixed questions of law and fact—reviewable under Guerrero-Lasprilla—and reached conflicting conclusions. In Wilkinson v. Garland the Supreme Court ruled that federal courts could review these decisions.

In May 2025, in Xia v. Bondi, No. 24-2304 (2025), the Second Circuit relied on Patel and affirmed the dismissal of Xia’s complaint for lack of subject-matter jurisdiction under 8 U.S.C. § 1252(a)(2)(B). Xia had lived unlawfully in the United States for over 30 years.
