= Wilkinson v. Garland =

US Supreme Court case on federal judiciary's jurisdiction over immigration courts

- Supreme Court of the United States

Argued November 28, 2023 Decided March 19, 2024
- Full case name: Situ Kamu Wilkinson v. Merrick B. Garland, Attorney General
- Docket no.: 22-666
- Citations: 601 U.S. 209 (more)
- Argument: Oral argument
- Opinion announcement: Opinion announcement

Case history
- Prior: Petition for review of a final order of the Board of Immigration Appeals dismissed and denied, No. 21-3166 (3rd Cir. 2022)

Holding
- Federal courts have the jurisdiction to review the determinations of immigration judges as a mixed question of law.

Court membership
- Chief Justice John Roberts Associate Justices Clarence Thomas · Samuel Alito; Sonia Sotomayor · Elena Kagan; Neil Gorsuch · Brett Kavanaugh; Amy Coney Barrett · Ketanji Brown Jackson

Case opinions
- Majority: Sotomayor, joined by Kagan, Gorsuch, Kavanaugh, Barrett
- Concurrence: Jackson (in judgment)
- Dissent: Roberts
- Dissent: Alito, joined by Roberts, Thomas

Laws applied
- Immigration and Nationality Act of 1952, Illegal Immigration Reform and Immigrant Responsibility Act of 1996, and Real ID Act

Wilkinson v. Garland, 601 U.S. 209 (2024), is a United States Supreme Court case in which the Court held that federal courts have the jurisdiction to review the determinations of immigration judges as a mixed question of law.

== Legal background ==
When a non-permanent resident of the United States has been designated for removal, the United States Attorney General can cancel their deportation if they have lived in the country for at least ten years, maintained good moral character, not committed any serious crimes, and their removal would impose an "exceptional and extremely unusual hardship" on their spouse, parent, or child if those relations are either US citizens or permanent residents.

As determined by the Board of Immigration Appeals in the 2001 case In re Monreal-Aguinaga, such hardship must be "substantially different from, or beyond, that which would normally be expected from the deportation of an alien with close family members here."

In the United States, Courts of Appeals and the Supreme Court can only review questions of law, as opposed to questions of fact. In immigration law, questions of fact are resolved by the immigration judge. In a legislative response to the Supreme Court decision INS v. St. Cyr, Section 106 of the Real ID Act reiterated that Congress' prior efforts to protect immigration court fact-finding from judicial review did not preclude "review of constitutional claims or questions of law raised upon a petition for review filed with an appropriate court of appeals."

=== Prior case law ===
In the 2020 case Guerrero-Lasprilla v. Barr, the Supreme Court applied Section 106 to allow judicial review of whether immigration courts were appropriately applying undisputed facts to legal standards. The majority opinion cited the 2001 case Immigration and Naturalization Service v. St. Cyr, which identified a presumption in favor of judicial review over any administrative action. However, in the 2022 case Patel v. Garland, the Supreme Court held that factual determinations, such as an immigration judge's determination of the credibility of an applicant, are not reviewable in federal courts.

== Immigration court ==
This case dealt with judicial review of the Department of Justice's Executive Office for Immigration Review

Fleeing from police violence in his birth country of Trinidad and Tobago, Situ Kamu Wilkinson intentionally overstayed his travel visa in 2003. In 2013, he had a child with his girlfriend in Pennsylvania, both of whom are US citizens. Due to his busy schedule as a construction worker, Wilkinson agreed to have his girlfriend move to the neighboring state of New Jersey for his asthmatic son to receive additional childcare support from his girlfriend's mother.

While repairing a house in 2019, Wilkinson was arrested by police officers after their search of the building identified crack cocaine. Upon reporting to the courthouse to contest the drug charges, Wilkinson was arrested by Immigration and Customs Enforcement for overstaying his visa. While those criminal drug charges were ultimately dropped, Wilkinson was forced to defend himself against deportation proceedings. Aside from claiming a right of asylum, withholding from removal, and protection under the United Nations Convention Against Torture, Wilkinson applied for cancellation of removal based on the emotional and financial hardship that his deportation would impose on his son.

Despite accepting the facts presented by Wilkinson and his family in their testimonies, Immigration Judge Robert M. Lewandowski ruled that his deportation would not impose an "exceptional and extremely unusual hardship" because his son could receive welfare and already lived apart from his father, Wilkinson could continue sending money from Trinidad and Tobago, and Wilkinson's girlfriend could begin working while her mother provides childcare. Upon review, the Bureau of Immigration Appeals upheld Lewandowski's verdict without issuing an opinion.

== Third Circuit ==
Represented by immigration lawyer Rhonda F. Gelfman, Wilkinson appealed his decision to the US Court of Appeals for the Third Circuit. Writing for the unanimous three-judge panel, Judge Stephanos Bibas cited Patel v. Garland to dismiss Wilkinson's appeal of the hardship determination as a discretionary judgement that the federal judiciary lacks jurisdiction over.

Additionally, Bibas denied Wilkinson's claim that the Attorney General cannot order deportation because his life would be threatened in Trinidad and Tobago because of his membership in a particular social group. Citing the Third Circuit's precedent from the 2018 case S.E.R.L. v. Attorney Gen. U.S., this exception to deportation proceedings only applies to groups that are socially distinct within their country, Bibas reasoned that victims of police violence is not a satisfactory classification.

== Supreme Court ==
=== Petition for review ===
In his petition for a writ of certiorari filed on January 17, 2023, Wilkinson highlighted a circuit split over whether the Supreme Court's decision in Guerrero-Lasprilla v. Barr designates hardship determinations as a mixed question of fact and law subject to judicial review. While the Fourth, Sixth, and Seventh Circuit Courts of Appeals have interpreted hardship determinations as mixed questions that they have jurisdiction over, the Third, Fifth, Eighth, Ninth, Tenth, and Eleventh Circuit Courts of Appeals have interpreted hardship determinations as solely discretionary questions of fact.

On May 12, 2023, Attorney General Merrick Garland filed his brief as the respondent. The government argued that whereas Guerrero-Lasprilla v. Barr allowed judicial review over the common law standard of equitable tolling, the statutory standard used in hardship determinations still cannot be reviewed. The Supreme Court granted the petition for review on June 30, 2024.

=== Oral arguments ===
During oral arguments held on November 18, 2023, Jaime Santos of the law firm Goodwin Procter argued the case on behalf of Wilkinson, while Colleen Sinzdak argued the case on behalf of the Department of Justice.

Chief Justice John Roberts argued that the federal judiciary is ill-equipped to assess the unusuality of hardship that deportation would cause, as compared to immigration judges that focus on assessing such claims. Justice Brett Kavanaugh expressed support for allowing federal courts to review hardship determinations while deferring to the immigration judges' fact-finding on the degree of unusuality.

Justice Samuel Alito argued that the Supreme Court's decision in Guerrero-Lasprilla v. Barr was inapplicable because hardship determinations are a far simpler legal standard than equitable tolling, making judicial review unnecessary.

Justices Sonia Sotomayor, Elena Kagan, Neil Gorsuch, Brett Kavanaugh, Amy Coney Barrett, and Ketanji Brown Jackson harshly criticized the government's reasoning that immigration justices and the Board of Immigration Appeals' hardship determinations cannot be appealed over an abuse of discretion, as long as the immigration courts had articulated a standard of review that complied with the statutory text. In her closing rebuttal, Santos argued that if the Supreme Court accepted the government's view, it would encourage regulatory agencies to include boilerplate text espousing previously upheld standards, regardless of whether the agency's determinations were actually applying the uncontested facts to those standards.

=== Decision ===
==== Majority ====
Sotomayor's majority opinion, citing the Supreme Court's decisions in Guerrero-Lasprilla v. Barr and Patel v. Garland, explained that even if mixed questions of fact and law will mostly involve a review of the facts to assess their application toward a judicial or statutory legal standard, they are still subject to judicial review by federal courts: Thus, the application of facts on Wilkinson's family to the "exceptional and extremely unusual hardship" standard was held as subject to judicial review.

The majority rejected the government's references to the 1928 case Williamsport Wire Rope Co. v. United States as irrelevant because that decision allowed a hardship determination for taxation purposes to be shielded from judicial review since they were conducted with minimal documentation. In other words, since immigration justices thoroughly explain their fact-finding and decision-making processes, the federal judiciary would be capable of solely reassessing the application of uncontested facts to legal standards.

==== Concurrence ====
Jackson's concurrence agreed with Alito's dissent that allowing judicial review of the application of uncontested facts to legal standards undermines Congress' intent in prohibiting the federal judiciary from reviewing these hardship determinations, except for assessing questions of law. However, Jackson cited Kimble v. Marvel Entertainment, LLC in reasoning that the precedent established in Guerrero-Lasprilla v. Barr carries more force.

==== Dissents ====
Alito's dissent argued that allowing judicial review of all mixed questions, regardless of whether they primarily involve factual analysis, will ultimately threaten the independence of juries in their ability to apply the facts presented during a trial to the appropriate legal standards as they see fit. Roberts' dissent agreed with Alito's dissent in explaining why Roberts switched from voting for judicial review in Guerrero-Lasprilla v. Barr to now finding it too expansive in this case.

== Reaction ==
The National Immigration Litigation Alliance praised the ruling. Recognizing that the Supreme Court did not specify the standard of review that the federal judiciary should apply in reviewing hardship determinations, the group recommended that immigration lawyers should begin advocating for de novo review, rather than judicial review that is deferential to the prior immigration courts' rulings.
