= List of United States Supreme Court cases, volume 589 =

This is a list of all the United States Supreme Court cases from volume 589 of the United States Reports:

Case name	Docket no.	Date decided
Thompson v. Hebdon	589 U.S. 1	November 25, 2019
Vacated and remanded to reexamine whether Alaska's political contribution limits were consistent with the Supreme Court's First Amendment case law.
Rotkiske v. Klemm	589 U.S. 8	December 10, 2019
The statute of limitations for private rights of action under the Fair Debt Collection Practices Act of 1977 begins to run when the violation occurs, not when the victim discovers it.
Peter v. NantKwest, Inc.	589 U.S. 23	December 11, 2019
USPTO cannot recover the salaries of its legal personnel under section 145 of the Patent Act.
Ritzen Group, Inc. v. Jackson Masonry, LLC	589 U.S. 35	January 14, 2020
An unreserved adjudication of a motion of relief from automatic stay by a bankruptcy court yields a final, appealable order.
Retirement Plans Comm. v. Jander	589 U.S. 49	January 14, 2020
Case vacated and remanded for consideration of arguments made for the first time in the Supreme Court briefing.
Roman Cath. Archdiocese v. Feliciano	589 U.S. 57	February 25, 2020
A Puerto Rico trial court has no jurisdiction to issue payment and seizure orders after a pension benefits proceeding is removed to federal district court and before the proceeding is remanded back to the Puerto Rico court.
Monasky v. Taglieri	589 U.S. 68	February 25, 2020
A child's "habitual residence" under the Hague Convention on the Civil Aspects of International Child Abduction should be determined based on the totality of the circumstances specific to the case, and should not be based on categorial requirements (e.g. such as an agreement between the parents).
Hernández v. Mesa	589 U.S. 93	February 25, 2020
Bivens's holding does not extend to claims based on a cross-border shooting.
Rodriguez v. FDIC	589 U.S. 132	February 25, 2020
The Bob Richards rule was not appropriately crafted and federal judges should not apply it when resolving disputes about tax allocations to members of an affiliated group filing a consolidated return.
McKinney v. Arizona	589 U.S. 139	February 25, 2020
An appellate court—not a jury—must reweigh the mitigating and aggravating factors in a death-penalty habeas corpus case after an Eddings error is identified.
Shular v. United States	589 U.S. 154	February 26, 2020
The definition of "serious drug offense" in the Armed Career Criminal Act (18 U.S.C. § 924(e)(2)(A)(ii)) requires only that the state statute involve conduct specified in the federal statute; it does not require that the state offense match a generic offense crafted by a federal court.
Holguin-Hernandez v. United States	589 U.S. 169	February 26, 2020
An argument for a specific, shorter sentence preserves an argument that a sentence imposed is unreasonably long for appeal.
Intel Corp. Investment Policy Comm. v. Sulyma	589 U.S. 178	February 26, 2020
Under the requirement in the Employee Retirement Income Security Act of 1974 that plaintiffs with actual knowledge of an alleged fiduciary breach must file suit within three years of gaining that knowledge, a plaintiff does not necessarily have actual knowledge of the information contained in disclosures that he receives but does not read or cannot recall reading.
Kansas v. Garcia	589 U.S. 191	March 3, 2020
The Immigration Reform and Control Act of 1986 neither expressly nor impliedly preempts Kansas's application of its state identity-theft and fraud statutes to the noncitizens in this case.
Guerrero-Lasprilla v. Barr	589 U.S. 221	March 23, 2020
The statutory phrase "questions of law" includes the application of a legal standard to facts when those facts are undisputed.
Allen v. Cooper	589 U.S. 248	March 23, 2020
Congress did not have the authority to abrogate the states' sovereign immunity from copyright infringement suits in the Copyright Remedy Clarification Act of 1990.
Kahler v. Kansas	589 U.S. 271	March 23, 2020
The due process clause of the United States Constitution does not require states to adopt a definition of the insanity defense that turns on whether the defendant knew that their actions were morally wrong.
Comcast Corp. v. Nat'l Ass'n of African-Am. Owned Media	589 U.S. 327	March 23, 2020
A §1981 plaintiff bears the burden of showing that the plaintiff's race was a but-for cause of its injury, and that burden remains constant over the life of the lawsuit.
Davis v. United States	589 U.S. 345	March 23, 2020
The text of Rule of Appellate Procedure 52(b) does not immunize factual errors from plain-error review, nor does Supreme Court precedent. There is no legal basis for the Fifth Circuit's practice of declining to review certain unpreserved factual arguments for plain error.
CITGO Asphalt Refining Co. v. Frescati Shipping Co.	589 U.S. 348	March 30, 2020
The plain language of the parties' safe-berth clause establishes a warranty of safety.
Kansas v. Glover	589 U.S. 376	April 6, 2020
When the officer lacks information negating an inference that the owner is driving the vehicle, an investigative traffic stop made after running a vehicle’s license plate and learning that the registered owner’s driver’s license has been revoked is reasonable under the Fourth Amendment.
Babb v. Wilkie	589 U.S. 399	April 6, 2020
Section 633 of the Age Discrimination in Employment Act of 1967 permits federal employees to sue over any adverse personnel action that is influenced by age, even if age was not the determinating factor.
Republican Nat'l Comm. v. Democratic Nat'l Comm.	589 U.S. 423	April 6, 2020
Stay granted of order by District Court for the Western District of Wisconsin, disallowing extension of the mail-in date for absentee ballots for the state's primary elections.

== See also ==
- List of United States Supreme Court cases by the Roberts Court
- 2019 term opinions of the Supreme Court of the United States
