= List of United States Supreme Court cases, volume 590 =

This is a list of all the United States Supreme Court cases from volume 590 of the United States Reports:

Case name	Docket no.	Date decided
Atlantic Richfield Co. v. Christian	590 U.S. 1	April 20, 2020
Landowners are "potentially responsible parties" under CERCLA and therefore need approval from the EPA before taking any action to restore their properties related to a Superfund site.
Thryv, Inc. v. Click-To-Call Technologies, LP	590 U.S. 45	April 20, 2020
Inter partes review decisions by the United States Patent and Trademark Office are not judicially reviewable.
Ramos v. Louisiana	590 U.S. 83	April 20, 2020
The Sixth Amendment right to a jury trial—as incorporated against the States by way of the Fourteenth Amendment—requires a unanimous verdict to convict a defendant of a serious offense.
County of Maui v. Hawaii Wildlife Fund	590 U.S. 165	April 23, 2020
The statutory provisions at issue require a permit when there is a direct discharge from a point source into navigable waters or when there is the functional equivalent of a direct discharge.
Romag Fasteners, Inc. v. Fossil, Inc.	590 U.S. 212	April 23, 2020
A plaintiff in a trademark infringement suit is not required to show that a defendant willfully infringed the plaintiff’s trademark as a precondition to a profits award.
Barton v. Barr	590 U.S. 222	April 23, 2020
The court held that for purposes of cancellation-of-removal eligibility, a §1182(a)(2) offense committed during the initial seven years of residence makes a noncitizen ineligible for relief under the §1229b(d)(1)(B) stop time rule.
Georgia v. Public.Resource.Org, Inc.	590 U.S. 255	April 27, 2020
Legal annotations that are created by legislatures are ineligible for copyright.
Maine Community Health Options v. United States	590 U.S. 296	April 27, 2020
1. The Risk Corridors statute created a Government obligation to pay insurers the full amount set out in §1342’s formula 2. Congress did not impliedly repeal the obligation through its appropriations riders.; 3. Petitioners properly relied on the Tucker Act to sue for damages in the Court of Federal Claims.
New York State Rifle & Pistol Association, Inc. v. City of New York	590 U.S. 336	April 27, 2020
The case was moot because New York updated its gun-control rule during the litigation.
United States v. Sineneng-Smith	590 U.S. 371	May 7, 2020
A federal appeals court abuses its discretion when it goes beyond the questions and issues presented by a party.
Kelly v. United States	590 U.S. 391	May 7, 2020
Because the scheme here did not aim to obtain money or property, Baroni and Kelly could not have violated the federal-program fraud or wire fraud laws.
Lucky Brand Dungarees, Inc. v. Marcel Fashions Group, Inc.	590 U.S. 405	May 14, 2020
Lucky Brand is not barred by res judicata or preclusion to raise a defense that could have been brought up in previous litigation due to the two cases not sharing common operative facts.
Opati v. Republic of Sudan	590 U.S. 418	May 18, 2020
Plaintiffs in a federal cause of action under Foreign Sovereign Immunities Act §1605A(c) may seek punitive damages for preenactment conduct.
GE Energy Power Conversion France SAS v. Outokumpu Stainless USA, LLC	590 U.S. 432	June 1, 2020
The Convention on the Recognition and Enforcement of Foreign Arbitral Awards does not conflict with domestic equitable estoppel doctrines that permit the enforcement of arbitration agreements by nonsignatories to those agreements.
Financial Oversight and Management Bd. for Puerto Rico v. Aurelius Investment, LLC	590 U.S. 448	June 1, 2020
All officers of the United States are subject to the Appointments Clause regardless of duty station. However, officers exercising primary local power are not officers "of the United States" and are not subject to the Appointments Clause.
Banister v. Davis	590 U.S. 504	June 1, 2020
A Federal Rule of Civil Procedure 59(e) motion to alter or amend a habeas court’s judgment is not a second or successive habeas petition under the Antiterrorism and Effective Death Penalty Act.
Thole v. U. S. Bank N. A.	590 U.S. 538	June 1, 2020
Participants in a defined-benefit retirement plan who are guaranteed a fixed payment each month regardless of the plan’s value or its fiduciaries' investment decisions lack Article III standing to bring a lawsuit against the fiduciaries under the Employee Retirement Income Security Act of 1974.
Nasrallah v. Barr	590 U.S. 573	June 1, 2020
The statutory limitations on judicial review of a final deportation order based on a noncitizen's commission of a crime do not preclude judicial review of a noncitizen's factual challenges to a Convention Against Torture order.
Lomax v. Ortiz-Marquez	590 U.S. 595	June 8, 2020
In regards to prisoners filing to proceed in forma pauperis, cases dismissed without prejudice for failure to state a claim count as "strikes" in the "three strike system" under 28 U.S.C § 1915(g), which bars prisoners from requesting waiver of fees after three cases of frivolous nature or if they fail to state a claim.
United States Forest Service v. Cowpasture River Preservation Assn.	590 U.S. 604	June 15, 2020
Because the Department of the Interior’s decision to assign responsibility over the Appalachian Trail to the National Park Service did not transform the land over which the Trail passes into land within the National Park System, the Forest Service had the authority to issue the special use permit.
Bostock v. Clayton County	590 U.S. 644	June 15, 2020
An employer who fires an individual based on their sexual orientation or gender identity violates Title VII of the Civil Rights Act of 1964.
Andrus v. Texas	590 U.S. 806	June 15, 2020
The defendant's claims of ineffective assistance of counsel were inappropriately dismissed, as the state court failed to address the prejudice prong of the Strickland v. Washington test.

== See also ==
- List of United States Supreme Court cases by the Roberts Court
- 2019 term opinions of the Supreme Court of the United States
