= Retirement Plans Committee v. Jander =

- Supreme Court of the United States

Original jurisdiction Decided January 14, 2020
- Full case name: Retirement Plans Committee v. Jander
- Docket no.: 18-1165
- Citations: 589 U.S. 49 (more)

Outcome
- Case vacated and remanded for consideration of arguments made for the first time in the Supreme Court briefing.

Court membership
- Chief Justice John Roberts Associate Justices Clarence Thomas · Ruth Bader Ginsburg; Stephen Breyer · Samuel Alito; Sonia Sotomayor · Elena Kagan; Neil Gorsuch · Brett Kavanaugh

Case opinions
- Per curiam
- Concurrence: Kagan, joined by Ginsburg
- Concurrence: Gorsuch

Laws applied
- Employee Retirement Income Security Act of 1974

Retirement Plans Committee v. Jander, 589 U.S. 49 (2020), was a United States Supreme Court case in which the Court declined to make a decision. The Court vacated and remanded to the Second Circuit Court of Appeals for consideration of arguments made for the first time in the Supreme Court briefing.

== Description ==
The petitioners argued that the Employee Retirement Income Security Act of 1974 imposes no duty on an Employee Stock Ownership Plan fiduciary to act on inside information. The government argued that an ERISA-based duty to disclose inside information that is not otherwise required to be disclosed by the securities laws would "conflict" at least with objectives of the complex insider trading and corporate disclosure requirements imposed by the federal securities laws.

== See also ==
- Fifth Third Bancorp v. Dudenhoeffer
