= Peter v. NantKwest, Inc. =

2019 United States Supreme Court opinion

- Supreme Court of the United States

Argued October 7, 2019 Decided December 11, 2019
- Full case name: Peter, Deputy Director, Patent and Trademark Office v. NantKwest, Inc.
- Docket no.: 18-801
- Citations: 589 U.S. 23 (more) 140 S. Ct. 365; 205 L. Ed. 2d 304
- Opinion announcement: Opinion announcement

Case history
- Prior: Nankwest, Inc. v. Lee, 162 F. Supp. 3d 540 (E.D. Va. 2016); Reversed in part sub nom. Nantkwest, Inc. v. Matal, 860 F.3d 1352 (Fed. Cir. 2017); Rehearing en banc granted, opinion vacated, 869 F.3d 1327 (Fed. Cir. 2017); On rehearing en banc sub nom. Nantkwest, Inc. v. Iancu, 898 F.3d 1177 (Fed. Cir. 2018); Cert. granted, 139 S. Ct. 1292 (2019).

Holding
- USPTO cannot recover the salaries of its legal personnel under section 145 of the Patent Act.

Court membership
- Chief Justice John Roberts Associate Justices Clarence Thomas · Ruth Bader Ginsburg; Stephen Breyer · Samuel Alito; Sonia Sotomayor · Elena Kagan; Neil Gorsuch · Brett Kavanaugh

Case opinion
- Majority: Sotomayor, joined by unanimous

Laws applied
- Section 145 of the Patent Act

Peter v. NantKwest Inc., 589 U.S. 23 (2019), was a United States Supreme Court case from the October 2019 term.

In a unanimous opinion, the Supreme Court ruled that the United States Patent and Trademark Office (USPTO) was not entitled to be reimbursed for attorney's fees from patent applicants, who file appeals against USPTO decisions.

The case reinforced the application of the American rule, a default principle in United States law which states that, in a lawsuit, each party is responsible for paying its own attorney's fees, unless there is a legislative or contractual requirement that says otherwise.

This case attracted attention from many intellectual property and law associations, many of whom (including the American Bar Association) filed friend-of-the-court briefs arguing against the government's request for attorney's fees from the plaintiff.

== Case history ==
In December 2001, a doctor named Hans Klingemann filed a patent application for a new method of treating cancer using natural killer cells. The patent application concerned a method that used a specific cell line of natural killer cells called NK-92. He then assigned the patent rights to NantKwest, Inc., California-based immunotherapy firm that is a subsidiary of NantWorks.

In 2010, the USPTO issued a final denial of the patent, claiming that Klingemann's method was "obvious" and, thus, denied a patent on it. The patent examiners noted that medical researchers had, since the 1980s and 1990s, known that natural killer cells could combat cancer cells, and that Klingemann's patent application was insufficiently novel to receive a patent.

NantKwest appealed the decision internally to the Patent Trial and Appeal Board (then known as the Board of Patent Appeals and Interferences), which is the internal USPTO administrative board that reviews decisions by USPTO's patent examiners. The Board of Patent Appeals and Interferences upheld the denial in 2013. NantKwest decided to file its appeal in the District Court under section 145 of the Patent Act, which allows dissatisfied patent applicants to file their appeal in the Eastern District of Virginia, rather than the Federal Circuit (which normally hears appeals of decisions by government agencies). As a district court, the Eastern District of Virginia has original jurisdiction, which allows the litigants to introduce new evidence not considered by the Board of Patent Appeals. This is in contrast to the Federal Circuit, which as an appellate court can only consider evidence that was in the record reviewed by the Board of Patent Appeals.

== In lower courts ==
=== Trial in the Eastern District of Virginia ===
The Eastern District of Virginia heard the case in 2016. Prior to discovery, USPTO filed a motion for summary judgment (essentially arguing that the court had enough agreed-upon facts on the record to rule on the case immediately without conducting further proceedings). NantKwest responded to the motion, arguing, that it had additional evidence and that there were enough factual disputes left to warrant a full trial. The District Court granted USPTO's motion for summary judgment, ruling in favor of the agency, that NantKwest's patent claims were invalid due to obviousness.

=== First appeal to the Federal Circuit ===
NantKwest appealed the District Court's decision again, this time to the Federal Circuit. The Federal Circuit affirmed the District Court's decision in a ruling issued in May 2017.

=== Motion in the Eastern District of Virginia ===
Following the Federal Circuit's affirmation, USPTO then filed a motion for reimbursement in District Court of "the expenses of the proceedings", as permitted by section 145 of the Patent Act. Among those expenses were $78,592.50 of attorneys' fees, which were a pro rata allocation of the three USPTO employees (two attorneys and one paralegal) who worked on the case. The USPTO's position was that the language of section 145, which stated that the applicant had to pay "All the expenses of the proceedings", entitled it to collect attorneys' fees. The District Court denied USPTO's motion, citing the American Rule. Under the District Court's interpretation of section 145, "all the expenses of the proceedings" simply referred to the expenses incurred in preparing for the case, such as printing documents, travel costs, and reasonable fees paid to expert witnesses. Without more explicit language in the law, the District Court found that USPTO could not collect attorney fees.

=== Second appeal to the Federal Circuit ===
USPTO appealed the District Court's ruling to the Federal Circuit. The case was heard in 2017 by a three-judge panel of the Federal Circuit, which included Chief Judge Sharon Prost as well as Judges Timothy B. Dyk and Kara Farnandez Stoll. In a 2-1 decision issued in June 2017, the Federal Circuit ruled in favor of USPTO. Applying a precedent the United States Court of Appeals for the Fourth Circuit, the panel ruled that "expenses of the proceeding" include a pro rata share of the salaries of USPTO employees who worked on the case. In her dissent, Judge Stoll argued that section 145 lacked the specificity needed to indicate that Congress had the intent to depart from the American Rule and allow for attorney fees to be awarded. She argued that, at the time Congress enacted section 145, the ordinary meaning word "expenses" did not usually include attorney fees. She also noted that, in other laws, Congress explicitly uses the term 'attorney fees' and often distinguishes between "expenses" and "attorney fees".

=== En banc rehearing by the Federal Circuit ===
On its own accord, the full Federal Circuit chose to rehear the case en banc—with all active judges on the panel participating (with the exception of Judge Raymond T. Chen, who recused himself since he was once an attorney for USPTO). In a 7-4 opinion released in July 2018, the Federal Circuit reversed the three-judge panel's decision. The court adopted a similar position to Judge Stoll's dissent, ruling that the language of section 145 was not specific enough to overcome the default American Rule or require, that the plaintiffs pay USPTO's attorney fees in addition to the other expenses of the trial.

=== Appeal to the Supreme Court ===
USPTO appealed again, this time to the United States Supreme Court. In March 2019, the Supreme Court granted USPTO's writ of certiorari, agreeing to hear the case. Morgan Chu, an intellectual property attorney, represented NantKwest before the Supreme Court. The USPTO was represented by the Deputy Solicitor General Malcolm Stewart. The case was argued on October 7, 2019.

== Supreme Court opinion ==
On December 11, 2019, the Supreme Court ruled in favor of NantKwest. Writing for a unanimous court, Justice Sonia Sotomayor's opinion stated that the reference in section 145 to "expenses" did not include USPTO's in-house attorney fees. The opinion noted that this was the first time in the history of section 145 that USPTO had requested reimbursement for attorney fees. It also noted that Congress had explicitly included a reference to attorney fees in five other sections of the Patent Act, which meant that their decision not to include an explicit reference to it in section 145 was meant to intentionally exclude them from the definition of "expenses" eligible for reimbursement.
