= Lucky Brand Dungarees, Inc. v. Marcel Fashions Group, Inc. =

Lucky Brand Dungarees Inc. v. Marcel Fashions Group, Inc.
- Supreme Court of the United States

Argued January 13, 2020 Decided May 14, 2020
- Full case name: Lucky Brand Dungarees Inc., et al. v. Marcel Fashions Group, Inc.
- Docket no.: 18-1086
- Citations: 590 U.S. 405 (more)
- Argument: Oral argument

Holding
- Lucky Brand is not barred by res judicata or preclusion to raise a defense that could have been brought up in previous litigation due to the two cases not sharing common operative facts.

Court membership
- Chief Justice John Roberts Associate Justices Clarence Thomas · Ruth Bader Ginsburg; Stephen Breyer · Samuel Alito; Sonia Sotomayor · Elena Kagan; Neil Gorsuch · Brett Kavanaugh

Case opinion
- Majority: Sotomayor, joined by unanimous

Lucky Brand Dungarees Inc. v. Marcel Fashions Group, Inc. 590 U.S. 405 (2020), was a United States Supreme Court case in which the Court held that claim preclusion did not apply to a defense that could have been raised in a previous case between two parties when the "common nucleus of operative fact" was different. The case involved a trademark dispute between Lucky Brand Dungarees Inc. and Marcel Fashions Group, Inc. over their respective marks involving "Lucky" and the phrase "Get Lucky" respectively.

== Background ==
Marcel Fashions Group and Lucky Brand Dungarees, both clothing companies, held claims to different trademark registration containing the word "Lucky". Marcel had registered the phrase "Get Lucky" in 1986, while Lucky Brand had their name registered as well as other terms containing "Lucky" since 1990. The issue would stem out of these three trademarked terms, causing Marcel to file suit in 2001 alleging trademark infringement, which the Court divided into three stages.

=== Litigation History ===
==== First Stage ====
There would be three rounds of litigation beginning in 2001, where Marcel would sue Lucky Brand for their use of "Get Lucky", which Marcel held the trademark for. Settling in 2003, Lucky Brand would stop using the term in exchange for a settlement agreement for Marcel to release its claims of the Lucky Brand's use of the "Lucky" trademark.

==== Second Stage ====
Lucky Brand would file suit against Marcel in the United States District Court for the Southern District of New York in 2005 alleging that the company copied aspects of Lucky Brand's clothing line and logo. Marcel countered on the basis that Lucky Brand continued to use the "Get Lucky" phrase in violation of the 2003 agreement, in addition to "Lucky Brand" being too similar to "Get Lucky" and therefore alleged trademark infringement. Lucky Brand would claim that Marcel was not able to counterclaim due to the 2003 settlement agreement, but Lucky Brand would be found to have continued to infringe on the phrase "Get Lucky" and was ordered to stop. This did not prevent the use of any other phrases with "Lucky" for Lucky Brand. The case would then go to trial and see a judgment in favor of Marcel on this alleged infringement.

==== Third Stage ====
Marcel would file against Lucky Brand in 2011, once again alleging Lucky Brand's continued infringement of their "Get Lucky" mark in violation of the 2005 case due to similar trademarks involving the word "Lucky" being too similar. The District Court would find that Marcel's allegations were too similar to those in 2005 and agree with Lucky Brand, but the United States Court of Appeals for the Second Circuit would disagree and state that Marcel still has a right to sue. The Court would reject, though, charging Lucky Brand for violations of the 2005 case as it did not involve the use of Marcel's "Get Lucky", but rather Lucky Brand's own "Lucky" marks. The case would be remanded.

Lucky Brand would argue that due to Marcel's releasing its claims due to the prior settlement agreement the case should be dismissed. Marcel would counter that this release defense could have been used, but was failed to be, in the 2005 case and thus cannot be argued. The District Court would side with Lucky Brand and dismiss the case.

An appeal to the Second Circuit was vacated and remanded under the terms of defense preclusion as it relates to claim preclusion. The Court found that stating that an argument should have been used in previous litigation, but was failed to be raised, should not be allowed in future litigation under similar terms that issue preclusion is implemented. The Second Circuit would raise four points relating to defense preclusion in its opinion in 2018:

1. “a previous action involved an adjudication on the merits”
2. “the previous action involved the same parties”
3. “the defense was either asserted or could have been asserted, in the prior action”
4. “the district court, in its discretion, concludes that preclusion of the defense is appropriate."

The Circuit Court, finding these satisfied, would vacate the lower court's ruling. Lucky Brand would appeal, and the Supreme Court would grant certiorari in 2019.

== Decision ==
In a unanimous decision penned by Justice Sonia Sotomayor, the Court's central line of reasoning was whether "claim preclusion applies to defenses raised in a later suit" as detailed in the Court's opinion, and determining whether defense preclusion falls within the lines of res judicata.

Highlighting that res judicata involves both issue preclusion (also known as collateral estoppel) which bars repeated litigation of issues that have been settled and were central to the outcome of the case, and claim preclusion (occasionally also called res judicata), barring issues that "could have been raised and decided in a prior action––even if they were not actually litigated." The opinion asserts that the filing of a case regarding the same claims as a previous case litigated between the same parties does not allow for proceedings on recovery that was previously available, such as a case that stems from "the same transaction [...] or involve a 'common nucleus of operative facts'".

The opinion then highlights, in line with the Circuit Court, that defense preclusion has not yet been determined to fall fully within the realms of res judicata via claim or defense preclusion. As Lucky Brand and Marcel agreed that issue preclusion did not apply to their case, and the Court found that the central issue of the previous cases were on different grounds involving different conduct, marks, and at different times, there was no commonality between the facts of the cases. In citing Davis v. Brown (1877), preclusions occur "only upon the matter actually at issue and determined in the original action". The opinion also highlights that conduct complained of after a suit is filed is a new claim.

As it relates to the case at hand, the opinion finds that Lucky Brand's defense in the 2011 case "did not threaten the judgment issued in the 2005 Action". As the 2005 judgment barred Lucky Brand's use of "Get Lucky", but the 2011 case was about the brand's use of trademarks with "Lucky" in them, these two cases were different and are not allotted res judicata. Because "the defense in the second suit" did not "threaten the validity of the judgment in the first suit", claim preclusion is not applicable. Because the grounds of these two cases were different, Lucky Brand can raise an argument that could have been raised in a previous suit.

== See also ==
- Trademark infringement
- Res judicata
- Trademark law in the United States
