= Ritzen Group, Inc. v. Jackson Masonry, LLC =

2019 United States Supreme Court opinion

- Supreme Court of the United States

Argued November 13, 2019 Decided January 14, 2020
- Full case name: Ritzen Group, Inc. v. Jackson Masonry, LLC
- Docket no.: 18-938
- Citations: 589 U.S. 35 (more) 140 S. Ct. 582; 205 L. Ed. 2d 419
- Argument: Oral argument
- Opinion announcement: Opinion announcement

Case history
- Prior: Ritzen Grp., Inc. v. Jackson Masonry, LLC, No. 3:17-CV-00806, 2018 WL 558837 (M.D. Tenn. Jan. 25, 2018); Stay granted, 589 B.R. 601 (M.D. Tenn. 2018); Affirmed sub nom. In re Jackson Masonry, LLC, 906 F.3d 494 (6th Cir. 2018); Cert. granted 139 S. Ct. 2614 (2019)

Holding
- An unreserved adjudication of a motion of relief from automatic stay by a bankruptcy court yields a final, appealable order

Court membership
- Chief Justice John Roberts Associate Justices Clarence Thomas · Ruth Bader Ginsburg; Stephen Breyer · Samuel Alito; Sonia Sotomayor · Elena Kagan; Neil Gorsuch · Brett Kavanaugh

Case opinion
- Majority: Ginsburg, joined by unanimous

Laws applied
- 28 U.S.C. § 158(a)(1)

Ritzen Group, Inc. v. Jackson Masonry, LLC, 589 U.S. 35 (2020) was a United States Supreme Court case from the October 2019 term. In a unanimous opinion, the Supreme Court ruled that "when the bankruptcy court unreservedly grants or denies relief", in this case on a motion for relief from an automatic stay, that decision presents a final order that may be appealed. In a 12-page opinion the Court relied upon its own precedent in Bullard v. Blue Hills Bank to affirm the court below.

== Background ==
Ritzen Group, Inc. agreed to buy land in Nashville, Tennessee from Jackson Masonry, LLC but the land sale was never effected. Ritzen sued for breach of contract in state court but, just days before the trial, Jackson filed for bankruptcy which triggered the automatic stay provision for all lawsuits. Ritzen sued in federal court asking that the state court be compelled to hear the case arguing that the bankruptcy was filed in bad faith.
