= Roman Catholic Archdiocese of San Juan, Puerto Rico v. Feliciano =

- Supreme Court of the United States

Decided February 24, 2020
- Full case name: Roman Catholic Archdiocese of San Juan, Puerto Rico v. Feliciano
- Docket no.: 18-921
- Citations: 589 U.S. 57 (more)

Holding
- A Puerto Rico trial court has no jurisdiction to issue payment and seizure orders after a pension benefits proceeding is removed to federal district court and before the proceeding is remanded back to the Puerto Rico court.

Court membership
- Chief Justice John Roberts Associate Justices Clarence Thomas · Ruth Bader Ginsburg; Stephen Breyer · Samuel Alito; Sonia Sotomayor · Elena Kagan; Neil Gorsuch · Brett Kavanaugh

Case opinion
- Per curiam

Roman Catholic Archdiocese of San Juan, Puerto Rico v. Feliciano, 589 U.S. 57 (2020), was a United States Supreme Court case in which the Court held that a Puerto Rico trial court has no jurisdiction to issue payment and seizure orders after a pension benefits proceeding is removed to federal district court and before the proceeding is remanded back to the Puerto Rico court.
