= Kahler v. Kansas =

- Supreme Court of the United States

Argued October 7, 2019 Decided March 23, 2020
- Full case name: Kahler v. Kansas
- Docket no.: 18-6135
- Citations: 589 U.S. 271 (more) 140 S. Ct. 1021; 206 L. Ed. 2d 312
- Argument: Oral argument

Case history
- Prior: Conviction affirmed, State v. Kahler, 307 Kan. 374, 410 P.3d 105 (Kan. 2018); cert. granted, 139 S. Ct. 1318 (2019).

Holding
- The Due Process Clause of the United States Constitution does not require states to adopt a definition of the insanity defense that turns on whether the defendant knew that their actions were morally wrong.

Court membership
- Chief Justice John Roberts Associate Justices Clarence Thomas · Ruth Bader Ginsburg; Stephen Breyer · Samuel Alito; Sonia Sotomayor · Elena Kagan; Neil Gorsuch · Brett Kavanaugh

Case opinions
- Majority: Kagan, joined by Roberts, Thomas, Alito, Gorsuch, Kavanaugh
- Dissent: Breyer, joined by Ginsburg, Sotomayor

Laws applied
- U.S. Const. amend. VIII, XIV

Kahler v. Kansas, 589 U.S. 271 (2020), is a case of the United States Supreme Court in which the justices ruled that the Eighth and Fourteenth Amendments of the United States Constitution do not require that states adopt the insanity defense in criminal cases that are based on the defendant's ability to recognize right from wrong. It was argued on October 7, 2019 and decided on March 23, 2020.

== Background ==
=== Insanity defense ===
The insanity defense is a traditional affirmative defense that dates at least back to English common law. The codification of the M'Naghten rules, which have been referenced in one form or another in US law as well as UK law, indicates that someone may be found not guilty of a crime because of a mental condition which prevents them from either controlling their actions or from knowing whether their actions were right or wrong.

=== Legislative activity ===
In 1995, the state of Kansas passed a law (Kan. Stat. Ann. § 22-3220) which revoked the traditional insanity defense. Defendants could no longer argue that, because of their mental illness, they were incapable of deciding right from wrong. Instead, defendants with mental illness were only permitted to argue that their mental illness prevented them from forming the specific intent (or mens rea) needed to commit the crime. Supreme Court Justice Stephen Breyer described the distinction between the two systems in his dissent in Delling v. Idaho, a case covering the same topic that the Supreme Court declined to hear in 2012:

Case One: The defendant, due to insanity, believes that the victim is a wolf. He shoots and kills the victim.

Case Two: The defendant, due to insanity, believes that a wolf, a supernatural figure, has ordered him to kill the victim.

In Case One, the defendant does not know he has killed a human being, and his insanity negates a mental element necessary to commit the crime. In Case Two, the defendant has intentionally killed a victim whom he knows is a human being; he possesses the necessary mens rea.

In both cases the defendant is unable, due to insanity, to appreciate the true quality of his act, and therefore unable to perceive that it is wrong. But … the defendant in Case One could defend the charge by arguing that he lacked the mens rea, whereas the defendant in Case Two would not be able to raise a defense based on his mental illness.

As of 2020, at least four other states have passed laws which are conceptually similar to Kansas's: Idaho, Alaska, Utah, and Montana.

=== Kahler murder case ===
In late 2009, James Kahler was arrested and charged with four counts of first-degree murder with the murder of four members of his family: his wife, his wife's grandmother, and his two teenage daughters.

During his trial, his defense argued that he had mentally 'snapped' following his divorce and job loss. At the time of the murder, they asserted that he suffered from depression and had an obsessive-compulsive, narcissistic, and histrionic personality. The prosecution rebutted the defense's psychiatric testimony with an expert psychiatrist of its own. The prosecution's psychiatrist conceded that Kahler indeed suffered from clinical depression but argued that he was still capable of planning the murders.

Despite this testimony, he was found guilty of each murder and sentenced to death at the end of August 2011. An Osage County judge issued a death warrant for Kahler on October 11, 2011.

== In lower courts ==
Under state law, capital murder cases can be appealed directly to the state supreme court. Accordingly, Kahler appealed his case to the Kansas Supreme Court, raising ten issues related to the conduct of the trial and actions taken by the judge and prosecutor. Two of these issues were the constitutionality of KSA 22–3220, the 1995 state law which abolished the traditional insanity plea and allowed defendants only the option of arguing that their mental illness prevented him from forming criminal intent, as well as the constitutionality of executing someone who currently suffers from a severe mental illness

In a ruling, the Kansas Supreme Court rejected Kahler's appeals, noting its prior precedent in State v. Bethel (2003):

The same arguments made by Kahler were considered and rejected by this court in State v. Bethel, 275 Kan. 456, 66 P.3d 840 (2003). The Bethel court conducted a thorough review of the pertinent decisions of the United States Supreme Court and other states that had considered the issue. Ultimately, the Bethel court concluded that "K.S.A. 22-3220 does not violate the defendant's right to due process under the United States or Kansas Constitutions." 275 Kan. at 473; see State v. Searcy, 118 Idaho 632, 798 P.2d 914 (1990) (finding mens rea approach of state statute did not violate due process); State v. Korell, 213 Mont. 316, 690 P.2d 992 (1984) (same); State v. Herrera, 895 P.2d 359 (Utah 1995) (same). Kahler relies on Finger v. State, 117 Nev. 548, 569, 27 P.3d 66 (2001), in which the Nevada Supreme Court held legal insanity is a fundamental principle of the criminal law of this country. But the Bethel court considered and rejected the reasoning of the Nevada Supreme Court in Finger, and we adhere to our Bethel decision.

The Kansas Supreme Court acknowledged that the judge had made errors in handling the case but did not deem these errors significant enough to warrant a new trial or to vacate Kahler's convictions or sentences.

He then appealed his case to United States Supreme Court, which granted a writ of certiorari on March 28, 2019.

At issue in the case is whether the lack of an insanity defense violates the Due Process Clause of the Fourteenth Amendment and Eighth Amendment.

== At the Supreme Court ==
Sarah Schrup, the head of the Northwestern University School of Law Supreme Court practicum, argued the case before the Court on behalf of Kahler. Toby Crouse, the Kansas Solicitor General, argued the case on behalf of the state of Kansas. Oral arguments were held in October 2019. Kahler v. Kansas was the first case that was heard during the October 2019 term.

Kahler's argument is that the M'Naghten rule represents the codification of a legal concept that goes back all the way to Medieval common law and should be considered part of the due process of law. His argument asserts that, for centuries, defendants were held culpable only when they were able to distinguish between right and wrong and that people who were legally insane did not have the capacity to do so. The state's argument emphasized the importance of federalism, allowing states the autonomy to make their own laws within the framework of the state and federal constitutions. The state also noted that the definition of insanity has varied in different ways throughout history and that one version (the M'Naghten rule) should not be viewed as an inherent aspect of due process.

=== Majority opinion ===
Justice Elena Kagan wrote the majority opinion which upheld Kansas's state law. Kagan noted the need to refer back to eminent common-law authorities, such as William Blackstone, Edward Coke, and Matthew Hale. In the opinion, Kagan wrote that the Kansas law did not violate Kahler's fundamental right to due process, noting that definitions of legal culpability and mental illness have been traditionally reserved for the states. Kagan noted that, contrary to Kahler's argument before the court, Kansas had not in fact abolished the insanity defense but had instead simply modified it, which the Constitution has generally permitted. The opinion points out that Kahler could have still presented a mental illness defense at trial and could also have presented evidence during his sentencing hearing.

=== Dissent ===
Justice Stephen Breyer dissented from the majority opinion, joined by Justices Ruth Bader Ginsburg and Sonia Sotomayor. Breyer conceded that states do have broad leeway to define state crimes and criminal procedures, including the definitions and standards of the insanity defense. However, he argued that Kansas's law did not simply modify the insanity defense but had removed the core requirement of whether or not the defendant could distinguish from right and wrong. Breyer's dissent was rooted in the centuries of tradition behind the original M'Naghten Rule and noted that only a handful of states had modified it in the way that Kansas had.
