= Thompson v. Hebdon =

- Supreme Court of the United States

Decided November 25, 2019
- Full case name: David Thompson, et al., v. Heather Hebdon, Executive Director of the Alaska Public Offices Commission, et al.
- Docket no.: 19-122
- Citations: 589 U.S. 1 (more) 140 S. Ct. 348; 205 L. Ed. 2d 245

Case history
- Prior: Judgment for defendants, sub nom. Thompson v. Dauphinais, 217 F. Supp. 3d 1023 (D. Alaska 2016); aff'd, 909 F.3d 1027 (9th Cir. 2018.

Holding
- Vacated and remanded to reexamine whether Alaska's political contribution limits were consistent with the Supreme Court's First Amendment case law.

Court membership
- Chief Justice John Roberts Associate Justices Clarence Thomas · Ruth Bader Ginsburg; Stephen Breyer · Samuel Alito; Sonia Sotomayor · Elena Kagan; Neil Gorsuch · Brett Kavanaugh

Case opinion
- Per curiam
- Statement: Ginsburg

Laws applied
- U.S. Const. amend. I

Thompson v. Hebdon, 589 U.S. 1 (2019), is a United States Supreme Court decision concerning campaign finance. The Ninth Circuit's decision was vacated and remanded by the Supreme Court.

== Background ==
The Supreme Court was asked to review the Ninth' Circuit's decision upholding Alaska's restrictions on campaign finance after the State of Alaska petitioned to the Supreme Court to reverse the Ninth Circuit. Alaska's limit on campaign contributions was $500 per year to an individual candidate and $1,000 per year to a political group.

== Decision ==
The Court issued its decision on November 25, 2019, vacating and remanding the Ninth Circuit's decision for further review.

== Reactions ==
Although the Supreme Court again ruled against campaign finance regulations in this decision, the court avoided making a sweeping decision that would have called into question other donation limits in other states. Therefore, UC Irvine election law professor Richard L. Hasen said that this was the "least bad way" campaign finance reform groups could have lost this case.

According to Jason Torchinsky, a campaign finance lawyer working in one of the GOP's most prominent law firms, the decision showed that a majority of the justices did not agree with low campaign donation limits but might have been hesitant to take on this fight in today's political climate.

=== Statement by Ginsburg ===
Justice Ruth Bader Ginsburg filed a statement respecting the Supreme Court's decision vacating and remanding the ruling of the Ninth Circuit. Ginsburg's statement notes that campaign finance limits regarding political parties in Alaska are more lenient than the limits on contributions to individual donors, unlike the laws in Vermont. Ginsburg expressed concern that Alaska is prone to be influenced excessively by the fossil fuel industry because it is a sparsely populated state that receives much of its revenue from the fossil fuel industry.
