= Rodriguez v. FDIC =

- Supreme Court of the United States

Argued December 3, 2019 Decided February 25, 2020
- Full case name: Rodriguez, as chapter 7 trustee for the Bankruptcy Estate of United Western Bancorp, Inc. v. Federal Deposit Insurance Corporation, as receiver for United Western Bank
- Docket no.: 18-1269
- Citations: 589 U.S. 132 (more)
- Argument: Oral argument
- Opinion announcement: Opinion announcement

Case history
- Prior: 473 F.2d 262

Holding
- The Bob Richards rule was not appropriately crafted and federal judges should not apply it when resolving disputes about tax allocations to members of an affiliated group filing a consolidated return.

Court membership
- Chief Justice John Roberts Associate Justices Clarence Thomas · Ruth Bader Ginsburg; Stephen Breyer · Samuel Alito; Sonia Sotomayor · Elena Kagan; Neil Gorsuch · Brett Kavanaugh

Case opinion
- Majority: Gorsuch, joined by a unanimous court

Rodriguez v. FDIC, 589 U.S. 132 (2020) was a United States Supreme Court case in which the court held that the Bob Richards rule was not appropriately crafted and federal judges should not apply it when resolving disputes about tax allocations to members of an affiliated group filing a consolidated return.

== Background ==
The United Western Bank entered FDIC receivership in 2011, in the aftermath of the 2008 financial crisis after suffering losses from exposure to mortgage backed securities and commercial borrower defaults. After a federal judge ruled in a separate lawsuit challenging the bank shutdown that regulators' decision to put the bank into receivership was reasonable and within their discretionary powers the bank's parent company, United Western Bancorp, entered into chapter 7 bankruptcy, and Simon Rodriguez – the plaintiff in Rodriguez v. FDIC– was named as the trustee. The dispute arose between bankruptcy trustee Simon Rodriguez and the FDIC over who would receive the $4 million refund issued by the IRS. In 2015, the IRS paid the income tax return filed by United Western Bancorp in 2011 to the bankruptcy court, handing the court the mandate to figure out to whom the refund is due.

== Legal matters ==
Under 26 U.S.C. § 1501 the IRS allows consolidated tax returns and issues refunds as a single payment. The IRS has little involvement in how the payment is distributed among group members and when disputes arise federal courts would presumably apply state laws. Some courts have instead created a federal common law rule known as the Bob Richards rule, taking its name from the case In re Bob Richards Chrysler-Plymouth Corp.

With the bankruptcy court given the responsibility of finding out to whom the money should be paid out, the court used a previous agreement between United Western Bancorp and United Western Bank to hold that the money should be paid to United Western Bancorp; however, this was appealed by the FDIC to a United States district court.

The district court overturned the decision of the previous court with the rationale that under the Bob Richards rule gave the money to United Western Bank as they were the entity that suffered monetary loss. Rodriguez appealed to the United States Court of Appeals for the Tenth Circuit. The appeals court upheld the district court's ruling and the Supreme Court granted certiorari.

== Decision ==
The previous judgment was vacated and the case was remanded to the Tenth Circuit to decide without considering the Bob Richards rule. The Supreme Court found that the Bob Richards rule was "not a legitimate exercise of federal common lawmaking", which went beyond the ability permitted of federal judges to "appropriately craft the rule of decision". Justice Gorsuch cites the fourth Cort v. Ash factor: Corporations are generally "creatures of state law", and state law is adequate for resolving a dispute about the distribution of a consolidated corporate tax refund.

== Further proceedings ==
On remand from the Supreme Court, the Tenth Circuit held that the outcome under state law was the same as it was under the Bob Richards rule, reaffirming their previous decision that the refund belonged to the FDIC as receiver, and not the trustee for the bank's failed parent company Western United Bancorp. The judgment was then remanded to the bankruptcy court.
