= Maine Community Health Options v. United States =

- Supreme Court of the United States

Argued December 10, 2019 Decided April 27, 2020
- Full case name: Maine Community Health Options v. United States
- Docket no.: 18-1023
- Citations: 590 U.S. 296 (more) 140 S. Ct. 1308

Case history
- Prior: Land of Lincoln Mut. Health Ins. Co. v. United States, 129 Fed. Cl. 81 (2016); affirmed, 892 F.3d 1184 (Fed. Cir. 2018); Moda Health Plan, Inc. v. United States, 130 Fed. Cl. 436 (2017); reversed, 892 F.3d 1311 (Fed. Cir. 2018); Blue Cross & Blue Shield of N. Carolina v. United States, 131 Fed. Cl. 457 (2017); affirmed, 729 F. App'x 939 (Fed. Cir. 2018); Maine Cmty. Health Options v. United States, 133 Fed. Cl. 1 (2017); affirmed, 729 F. App'x 939 (Fed. Cir. 2018); Rehearing en banc denied, 908 F.3d 738 (Fed. Cir. 2018); Cert. granted, 139 S. Ct. 2743 (2019)

Holding
- 1. The Risk Corridors statute created a Government obligation to pay insurers the full amount set out in §1342’s formula 2. Congress did not impliedly repeal the obligation through its appropriations riders.; 3. Petitioners properly relied on the Tucker Act to sue for damages in the Court of Federal Claims.

Court membership
- Chief Justice John Roberts Associate Justices Clarence Thomas · Ruth Bader Ginsburg; Stephen Breyer · Samuel Alito; Sonia Sotomayor · Elena Kagan; Neil Gorsuch · Brett Kavanaugh

Case opinions
- Majority: Sotomayor, joined by Roberts, Ginsburg, Breyer, Kagan, Kavanaugh; Thomas, Gorsuch (all but Part III–C)
- Dissent: Alito

Laws applied
- Affordable Care Act, Tucker Act

Maine Community Health Options v. United States, 590 U.S. 296 (2020), was a United States Supreme Court case involving the expired Risk Corridors program of the Affordable Care Act (ACA), through which the Department of Health and Human Services (DHHS) mitigated losses of unprofitable healthcare plans through the profits of the profitable plans during the first three years of the program. Congress had passed legislation as riders in appropriations bills, which prevented the government from making payments to the unprofitable plans. Several of the insurers went bankrupt from the lack of payment, and multiple insurers sued the government to recover their funds on the basis the risk corridor was a commitment to be paid. The U.S. Court of Appeals for the Federal Circuit rejected those claims, concluding that the subsequent appropriation riders absolved the government of its responsibility to pay. In the 8–1 decision that consolidated three of the subsequent appeals, the Supreme Court ruled that Congress's riders did not cancel the government's obligation under the ACA to pay the full amount to the unprofitable plans, and that the insurers had properly sought relief through a Tucker Act action in the Court of Federal Claims.

== Background ==
The Patient Protection and Affordable Care Act (ACA), also known as "Obamacare", passed as law in 2010. Part of the law established a healthcare plan marketplace where consumers could shop for and select individual plans. Because this was a rather new concept, drawing in new insurers alongside well-established ones, and considered to be potentially risky, the ACA included a Risk Corridor program, described at 42 U.S.C. § 18062(1342) to limit the amount of profit or losses any single healthcare plan could make or lose during the first three years of implementation of the ACA, from 2014 through 2016. Based on calculations set by the Department of Health and Human Services (DHHS), profitable healthcare plans would pay a portion of those profits to the Centers for Medicare and Medicaid Service (CMS), and subsequently the CMS would pay to cover a portion of the losses to the unprofitable plans. The amounts that plans were to pay or were to be covered by the government were based on percentage differentials of expected versus actual medical costs, and did not cover all gains or losses by insurers, leaving those that were drastically under-performing still responsible for their losses. Conceptually, the idea was that by the end of 2016, healthcare plans would have enough data from three years of operations to be able to minimize risk and thus should not have significant losses or profit. As passed by the ACA, there were no set limit to how much the government would collect or pay out, nor for the program to be fiscally neutral, though this was the intended target. Similar risk corridors had been used successfully before, notably in Medicare Part D coverage.

The Republican Party had generally been against the ACA, and with the 2014 United States elections, gained controlled of the Senate while retaining control of the House of Representatives. Senator Marco Rubio introduced legislation in November 2013 to amend the ACA to repeal the Risk Corridor program, which he had described as "taxpayer-funded bailouts", but which failed to pass. Rubio was able to successfully able to introduce a rider into the 2014 appropriations for the DHHS that prevented CMS from using other accounts to fund payments for the Risk Corridors program, effectively requiring it to be fiscally neutral. In tallying the 2014 year-end funds, CMS found they had an approximate US$2.5 billion deficit in payments to under-performing insurers due to the new rider. CMS were forced to reduce payments that year on a pro rata basis, approximately down to 12.6% of the originally promised payments, with the expectation to pay the remaining owed funds from the profitable plan payments in 2015 and 2016. A similar rider was introduced in the subsequent 2015 appropriations bill to limit the funds the CMS could use to pay out insurers, and with 2015 also having another large deficit towards underperforming insurers, CMS could issue no 2015 payments and only cover a portion of the owed 2014 payments. A similar situation occurred in 2016, with yet another rider and another deficit. By the end of 2016, CMS estimated it still owed insurers over US$12 billion from the Risk Corridor program. Over a dozen insurers were forced to declare bankruptcy as a result of the lack of payments.

Some of the insurers that were owed money by the CMS sued the government for failure to pay. The Supreme Court case here is a consolidation of three cases from four different insurers: Maine Community Health Options, Moda Health Plan, Blue Cross and Blue Shield of North Carolina, and the Land Of Lincoln Mutual Health Insurance Company. All four had filed separate suits at the United States Court of Federal Claims under the Tucker Act, asserting that §1342 of the ACA held the government responsible to fulfill the payments promised by the Risk Corridor program. Of the four cases, only Moda Health had been given partial summary judgement that the government was still required to fulfill payments. All four cases were appealed to the United States Court of Appeals for the Federal Circuit which ruled in favor of the government in all three cases, in that the riders of the appropriation bills eliminated the responsibility of the government to fulfill the payments.

== Supreme Court ==
All four insurers petitioned the Supreme Court to hear the case, which they certified in June 2019 for the 2019–2020 term, consolidating the three cases under Maine Community Health Options. Oral arguments were heard on December 10, 2019, during which observed felt that a bi-partisan majority group of the Justices appeared to side with the insurers, asking questions that compared the Risk Corridor program and its equivalency to a typical business contract. Only Justice Samuel Alito appeared to side with the government's stance.

The Court issued its decision on April 27, 2020. In the 8–1 decision, the majority ruled that the Risk Corridor program as defined in §1342 was an obligation for the government to pay the amount owed set by the predetermined calculation to the insurers, and that Congress improperly used appropriation riders to try to cancel this obligation. Further, the majority ruled that the insurers could bring a damages action in the Court of Federal Claims against the government under the Tucker Act. Justice Sonia Sotomayor wrote the majority which was joined by all but Justice Alito. Sotomayor wrote that their decision reflected "a principle as old as the nation itself: The government should honor its obligations." Sotomayor affirmed that insurers "may seek to collect payment through a damages action in the Court of Federal Claims" via the Tucker Act. Justice Alito wrote in the sole dissenting opinion that the majority's decision was "a massive bailout for insurance companies that took a calculated risk and lost" and that "This money will have to be paid even though Congress has pointedly declined to appropriate money for that purpose."
