= Banister v. Davis =

- Supreme Court of the United States

Decided June 1, 2020
- Full case name: Banister v. Davis
- Docket no.: 18-6943
- Citations: 590 U.S. 504 (more)

Holding
- A Federal Rule of Civil Procedure 59(e) motion to alter or amend a habeas court’s judgment is not a second or successive habeas petition under the Antiterrorism and Effective Death Penalty Act.

Court membership
- Chief Justice John Roberts Associate Justices Clarence Thomas · Ruth Bader Ginsburg; Stephen Breyer · Samuel Alito; Sonia Sotomayor · Elena Kagan; Neil Gorsuch · Brett Kavanaugh

Case opinions
- Majority: Kagan, joined by Roberts, Ginsburg, Breyer, Sotomayor, Gorsuch, Kavanaugh
- Dissent: Alito, joined by Thomas

Laws applied
- Fed. R. Civ. P. 59(e), Antiterrorism and Effective Death Penalty Act

Banister v. Davis, 590 U.S. 504 (2020), was a United States Supreme Court case in which the Court held that a Federal Rule of Civil Procedure 59(e) motion to alter or amend a habeas court’s judgment is not a second or successive habeas petition under the Antiterrorism and Effective Death Penalty Act.
