= United States Forest Service v. Cowpasture River Preservation Ass'n =

- Supreme Court of the United States

Argued February 24, 2020 Decided June 15, 2020
- Full case name: United States Forest Service, et al., Petitioners, v. Cowpasture River Preservation Association, et al.
- Docket nos.: 18-1584; 18-1587
- Citations: 590 U.S. 604 (more) 140 S. Ct. 1837

Case history
- Prior: Cowpasture River Pres. Ass'n v. Forest Serv., 911 F.3d 150 (4th Cir. 2018), cert. granted, 140 S. Ct. 36 (2019).

Holding
- Because the Department of the Interior’s decision to assign responsibility over the Appalachian Trail to the National Park Service did not transform the land over which the Trail passes into land within the National Park System, the Forest Service had the authority to issue the special use permit.

Court membership
- Chief Justice John Roberts Associate Justices Clarence Thomas · Ruth Bader Ginsburg; Stephen Breyer · Samuel Alito; Sonia Sotomayor · Elena Kagan; Neil Gorsuch · Brett Kavanaugh

Case opinions
- Majority: Thomas, joined by Roberts, Breyer, Alito, Gorsuch, Kavanaugh; Ginsburg (except Part III–B–2)
- Dissent: Sotomayor, joined by Kagan

Laws applied
- Mineral Leasing Act of 1920; National Forest Management Act of 1976; National Environmental Policy Act; Administrative Procedure Act

United States Forest Service v. Cowpasture River Preservation Ass'n, 590 U.S. 604 (2020), was a United States Supreme Court case involving the permitting of the Atlantic Coast Pipeline under the Appalachian Trail in the George Washington National Forest. At issue were conflicting agencies and laws for those agencies. The permit was issued by United States Forest Service (USFS) which has responsibility of the national forest, while the Trail itself is part of the National Park Service (NPS), and which under the Mineral Leasing Act of 1920 does not allow any other government agency to issue right of way permits through its lands. In the 7–2 decision, the Supreme Court ruled that due to how the NPS was assigned the Trail by the Department of the Interior, it did not transform the lands within the trail to lands of the NPS and were still within the USFS's purview, and thus ruled that the USFS could issue the permit. The case had been consolidated with Atlantic Coast Pipeline LLC v. Cowpasture River Preservation Association (Docket 18-1587).

== Background ==
The Atlantic Coast Pipeline project was a private development by the joint venture of Atlantic Coast Pipeline, LLC of several energy companies to bring natural gas from wells in West Virginia, through Virginia, and then to a terminus in North Carolina and then onto other parts of the U.S. eastern seaboard, with a significant portion of this to be exported to India and Japan. Planning for the pipeline had started in 2013, and has become a high-value project under the Trump administration. The project drew a great deal of opposition from residents in the affected areas, businesses, and environmentalists. Legal actions to block permits and alter the project's plans raised the cost projects from US$5.1 billion to US$8 billion by 2020, and delayed the plan to break ground on the pipeline in late 2017.

Proposed route of the pipeline. The red box marks the approximate location where the pipeline would cross under the Appalachian Trail.

A key right of way permit for the pipeline was for crossing the George Washington National Forest, which covers the Appalachian Mountains along the border of West Virginia and Virginia. The George Washington National Forest was established as a national forest and part of the United States' public lands in 1918, and entrusted to the United States Forest Service (USFS). Via the Mineral Leasing Act of 1920 and subsequent amendments, agencies like the USFS may issue special use right of way permits for public lands under their authority.

The USFS became involved early in the planning process of the pipeline around April 2015, commenting on early Environmental Impact Statements (EIS) from the Federal Energy Regulatory Commission (FERC) for the project. The USFS had asserted that the EIS needed to evaluate alternate plans that would not use the national forest, as their policy was to only issued special-use permits on forest lands for cases which "cannot reasonably be accommodated on non-National Forest System lands". Though subsequent draft EIS included two of ten promised alternative routes, the USFS stated they could not assess these until the full evaluation was completed. However, by 2017 with the developer's original deadlines nearing, the USFS told the developers and FERC that they were satisfied with having the two alternatives to allow FERC to issue its final EIS by July 2017, and subsequently, granted the special use permits to the pipeline by January 2018. The permits allowed for about 0.1 miles (0.16 km) of pipeline to pass 600 feet (180 m) under the Appalachian Trail. One of the plaintiffs in the suit, the Southern Environmental Law Center, said that the change in the USFS stance appeared to be tied to Donald Trump taking office and indicate pressure on the USFS by the President to push the project through.

A collation of environmental groups, led by the Cowpasture River Preservation Association and including the Sierra Club, the Southern Environmental Law Center, the Shenandoah Valley Network and the Virginia Wilderness Committee, filed suit against the USFS' action in the United States Court of Appeals for the Fourth Circuit in February 2018. The collation argued that the USFS's decision violated its authority under the Mineral Leasing Act and the National Forest Management Act of 1976, and acted "arbitrarily and capriciously" under the National Environmental Policy Act and Administrative Procedure Act. The Fourth Circuit ruled on December 13, 2018 against the USFS and vacated the special use permit. The three-judge court unanimously agreed that the USFS's decision to grant the permit "is particularly informed by the Forest Service's serious environmental concerns that were suddenly, and mysteriously, assuaged in time to meet a private pipeline company's deadlines". The court further ruled that the USFS did not have the authority over the land use of the Appalachian Trail, which by the National Trails System Act of 1968 had been designed as a National Park by the United States Department of the Interior under authority of the National Park Service (NPS), and which the amendments to the Mineral Leasing Act by the Trans-Alaska Pipeline Authorization Act, were exempted from being granted for use for right-of-way permits under 30 U.S.C. § 185(b)(1). The court also ruled on two other points, asserting that the USFS permit failed to account for mandatory environmental regulations to protect the land and ecology, and that the permitting did not perform enough evaluation of the risk related to landslides and erosion due to the steep lands in the area. The decision of the court was noted to end with a quote from The Lorax: "We trust the United States Forest Service to 'speak for the trees, for the trees have no tongues.'"

== Supreme Court ==
Both the USFS and the project developers petitioned the Fourth Circuit's decision to the Supreme Court specifically on the USFS's authority to issue the special use permit for lands covered by the Appalachian Trail. They expressed concern that the Fourth Circuit's decision related to the Appalachian Trail "has effectively erected a 2,200-mile barrier severing the eastern seaboard from oil and gas sources west of the Appalachian Trail". Both petitions asked the Court to review whether the USFS does have the ability to issue right of way special use permits for the lands traversed by the Appalachian Trail. The Supreme Court accepted the case in October 2019. Oral arguments were heard on February 24, 2020. The arguments examined what ramifications the Fourth Circuit's decision would have if it were held, that many numerous pipelines and similar projects had already been built to cross the Appalachian Trail before it was established as a national park in 1968, and how the concept of "land" versus "right of way" could be reconciled between the USFS and NPS's oversight in this area.

The Court's decision was issued on June 15, 2020. In the 7–2 decision, the court ruled that under the National Trails System Act, the Appalachian Trail was established as a right of way through the national forest, established through agreements between the Department of the Interior and the USFS, and did not transform that land into national park land. Therefore, the land the Trail occupies remains as land within the jurisdiction of USFS, and thus they were empowered to issue the special use permit under the Mineral Leasing Act.

The majority opinion was written by Justice Clarence Thomas. He summarized the judgement, "The lands that the trail crosses are still 'federal lands' and the Forest Service may grant a pipeline right of way through them — just as it granted a right of way for the trail. Sometimes a complicated regulatory scheme may cause us to miss the forest for the trees. But at bottom, these cases boil down to a simple proposition: A trail is a trail, and land is land."

Justice Sonia Sotomayor wrote the dissenting opinion joined by Justice Elena Kagan. Sotomayor stated the majority decision was "inconsistent with the language of three statutes, long-standing agency practice, and common sense", and that "Only Congress, not this court, should change that mandate [of permitting pipelines across federally-owned lands]".

The Supreme Court decision reversed the Fourth Circuit's judgement and remanded the case for review. The decision only addressed the question of the USFS's ability to issue permits, and did not touch on the three other factors from the Fourth Circuit's opinion: that the USFS's permit did not comply with mandatory standards for protecting the environment, that the evaluation did not properly evaluate soil and erosion concerns, and whether the USFS's decision to issue the permits were arbitrary and capricious.

== Aftermath ==
On July 5, 2020, the companies seeking to build the pipeline announced they had canceled the project due to other lingering legal challenges raised by opponents of the project, unrelated to the right of way permit at the center of this case.
