= CITGO Asphalt Refining Co. v. Frescati Shipping Co. =

- Supreme Court of the United States

Argued November 5, 2019 Decided March 30, 2020
- Full case name: CITGO Asphalt Refining Company, et al., Petitioners v. Frescati Shipping Company, Ltd., et al.
- Docket no.: 18-565
- Citations: 589 U.S. ___ (more) 140 S. Ct. 1081; 206 L. Ed. 2d 391

Case history
- Prior: In re Frescati Shipping Co., Ltd., No. 05-cv-00305, 2011 WL 1436878 (E.D. Pa. Apr. 12, 2011); United States v. Citgo Asphalt Ref. Co., No. 08-cv-02898, 2011 WL 1379647 (E.D. Pa. Apr. 12, 2011); Affirmed in part, vacated in part, 718 F.3d 184 (3d Cir. 2013); Cert. denied, 571 U.S. 1197 (2014); No. 05-cv-00305, 2016 WL 4035994 (E.D. Pa. July 25, 2016); Affirmed in part, reversed in part, 886 F.3d 291 (3d Cir. 2018); Cert. granted, 139 S. Ct. 1599 (2019)

Holding
- The plain language of the parties' safe-berth clause establishes a warranty of safety.

Court membership
- Chief Justice John Roberts Associate Justices Clarence Thomas · Ruth Bader Ginsburg; Stephen Breyer · Samuel Alito; Sonia Sotomayor · Elena Kagan; Neil Gorsuch · Brett Kavanaugh

Case opinions
- Majority: Sotomayor, joined by Roberts, Ginsburg, Breyer, Kagan, Gorsuch, Kavanaugh
- Dissent: Thomas, joined by Alito

CITGO Asphalt Refining Co. v. Frescati Shipping Co., 589 U.S. ___ (2020), was a United States Supreme Court case dealing with the responsibility of costs of cleanup resulting from a 2004 oil spill on the Delaware River near Paulsboro, New Jersey from the result of a hull rupture. The ship's owner, the Frescati Shipping Company, was responsible for the costs of the cleanup, coming to more than US$143 million, but under the Oil Pollution Act of 1990, believed that Citgo, who had ordered the shipment, bore responsibly for the shipping route through shallow waters that led to the spill. After years of litigation, the Supreme Court ruled in its 7–2 decision that the contract language established between Citgo and Frescati established that Citgo would provide safe berth for the vessel, and thus ultimately responsible for the spill.

== Case background ==
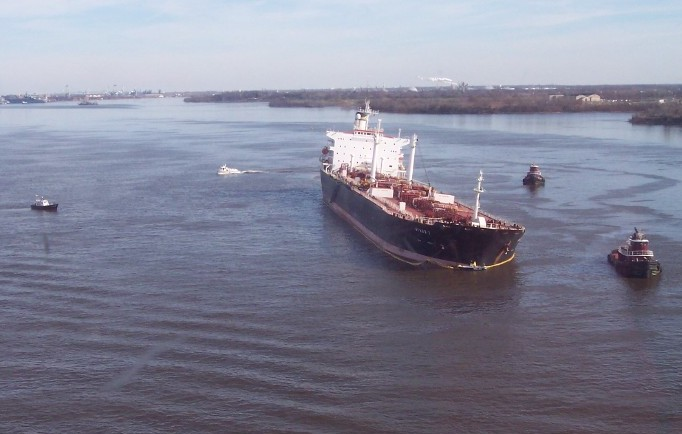
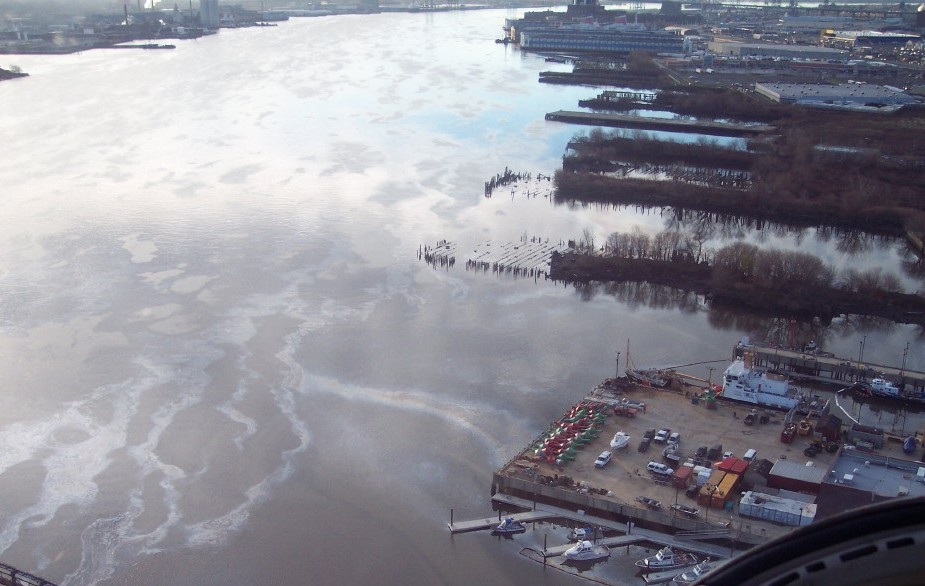
The Athos I (top) a day after its hull was ruptured in 2004, and oil spills still on the Delaware River (bottom) three days later

On November 26, 2004, the Athos I, a 750-foot (230 m) single-hull oil tanker carrying 13.3 million US gallons (50×10^{6} L) of oil that had traveled from Venezuela was maneuvering to dock at a Citgo dock on the Delaware River near its refinery at Paulsboro. An anchor in the river's bed, known to have been there since at least 2001, caught on the ship's hull and tore a 6-foot (1.8 m) gash into it, releasing more than 260,000 US gallons (980,000 L) of oil into the river. The spill spread downstream affecting the shoreline in more than three states (Pennsylvania, New Jersey, and Delaware), killing over 11,000 birds, temporarily shut down the Salem Nuclear Power Plant, and halted commercial use of the river for several weeks during cleanup efforts. At the time, it was considered the second worst oil spill in the United States following the Exxon Valdez oil spill, with cleanup costs over US$267 million. The spill led to passage of the Coast Guard and Maritime Transportation Act of 2006 which among provisions, tripled fines resulting from oil spills from single-hulled vessels to encourage double-hull use, as well as requiring those with knowledge of obstructions in waterways to inform the Coast Guard for immediate removal.

The Athos I was under a time charter from the Frescati Shipping Co. to Star Tankers Inc. under a multi-year contract, while the specific transport from Venezuela to New Jersey was a standard voyage charter between Star Tanker and Citgo. Under the Oil Pollution Act of 1990, Frescati was considered to be the responsible party and was to pay for more than US$140 million in cleanup, though the Act limited Frescati's responsibility to about US$45 million, with the rest paid out of the government's Oil Spill Liability Trust Fund, approximately US$87 million. The United States Coast Guard also bore some of the costs.

As the Oil Pollution Act allows for recovery of cleanup funds from liable parties after the matter, Frescati and the United States Government filed suit against Citgo in 2011 to recover their costs, asserting it was their responsibility to make sure the area around their docks had safe berth for the vessel. The anchor was found to be just within the 37 feet (11 m) safe berth clause in the Star-Citgo voyage charter. Frescati sought to recover their US$45 million with the US$35 million interest in addition to US$10 million in costs to repair the Argos I. Heard in the United States District Court for the Eastern District of Pennsylvania, Judge John P. Fullam ruled in favor of Citgo, stating in his ruling that the ultimate responsible was on the party that left the anchor in the river, which was impossible to identify as any markings had long worn off from it. Frescati appealed to the Third Circuit, which partially vacated the District Court's ruling. The Third Circuit stated that the District Court had ignored the language of the contract law that still applied to the matter, and remanded the case back for review on this matter.

On review, District Judge Joel Slomsky (taking over for the retiring Judge Fullam) did affirm in his 2016 ruling that it was Citgo's responsibly to provide safe berth to the Athos I near its port under terms of the contract, and thus partially responsible for the cleanup spills, ordering Citgo to pay US$71.5 million (US$55.5 million and interest) to Frescati and US$48.6 million to the government. Citgo appealed again to the Third Circuit, arguing on the terms that the safe berth passage was considered a duty of due diligence rather than an assurance of safe passage. The Third Circuit rejected Citgo's argument and upheld the ruling in 2018 and further found that Citgo should be held responsible for more of the government's sought damages, as it rejected Citgo's claim that removing the anchor was the Coast Guard's responsibility. In their opinion, the Third Circuit stated that Citgo was attempting to argue for equitable relief in terms of splitting the costs for cleanup, but the case was about contractual relief under the terms of the charter contracts and the Oil Pollution Act.

== Supreme Court ==
Citgo petitioned to the Supreme Court on the question of the safe berth clause being an assurance of safe travel or duty of due diligence, as their case along with others from the Second and Fifth Circuits created a split decision. The Supreme Court accepted the writ of certiorari in April 2019.

Oral arguments were heard on November 9, 2019. Reporters found the Justices mostly sided on a strict contract reading supporting the intention that the safe berth clause was to be read as an assurance of safe travel, as if Citgo wanted to use other less-strict language to reduce their liability, there was many other contract mechanisms available they could have used.

The Court issued its decision on March 30, 2020, affirming the Third Circuit's decision. In the 7-2 majority opinion, Justice Sonia Sotomayor wrote that "We conclude that the language of the safe-berth clause here unambiguously establishes a warranty of safety", and thus Citgo was responsible for assuring the safe berth for the Athos I and the subsequent cleanup from the oil spill. Justice Clarence Thomas wrote a dissenting opinion joined by Justice Samuel Alito, in which he wrote that the language of the safe berth clause was not clear that it implied a warranty, and that there should be an evaluation if this was considered a standard practice in the industry.
