= Barton v. Barr =

- Supreme Court of the United States

Argued November 4, 2019 Decided April 23, 2020
- Full case name: Andre Martello Barton, Petitioner v. William P. Barr, Attorney General
- Docket no.: 18-725
- Citations: 590 U.S. 222 (more)
- Argument: Oral argument

Case history
- Prior: United States Court of Appeals for the Eleventh Circuit

Holding
- The court held that for purposes of cancellation-of-removal eligibility, a §1182(a)(2) offense committed during the initial seven years of residence makes a noncitizen ineligible for relief under the §1229b(d)(1)(B) stop time rule

Court membership
- Chief Justice John Roberts Associate Justices Clarence Thomas · Ruth Bader Ginsburg; Stephen Breyer · Samuel Alito; Sonia Sotomayor · Elena Kagan; Neil Gorsuch · Brett Kavanaugh

Case opinions
- Majority: Kavanaugh, joined by Roberts, Thomas, Alito, Gorsuch
- Dissent: Sotomayor, joined by Ginsburg, Breyer, Kagan

Laws applied
- 8 U.S. Code § 1182

Barton v. Barr, 590 U.S. 222 (2020) is a Supreme Court of the United States ruling which upheld a decision by the Eleventh Circuit Court of Appeals that permanent residents (green card holders) rendered "inadmissible" for some crimes committed under 8 U.S.C. § 1182(a)(2) within the initial seven years of continuous residence were ineligible for 8 U.S.C. § 1229b cancellation of removal relief.

== Background ==
Andre Martello Barton was born in Jamaica, and admitted to the United States in May of 1989. In 1992, he became a lawful permanent resident of the U.S. However, he was found guilty of criminal damage to property, aggravated assault, possession of a firearm during the commission of a felony (O.C.G.A. § 16-11-106) and violations of Georgia's Controlled Substances Act. The Department of Homeland Security (DHS) determined that Barton could be deported from the United States for his multiple criminal convictions.

Deportable offenses are different from criminal activities that lead to inadmissibility. Deportation almost always requires a conviction, while inadmissibility may result simply by committing any §1182(a)(2) offense. Lawfully admitted noncitizens are usually only deported for deportable conduct, but the interaction of some statutory provisions may result in serious immigration consequences for LPRs who are found to have committed non-deportable offenses, as happened in this case when the stop-time rule made Barton ineligible for cancellation of removal.

Barton was facing deportation for multiple criminal convictions, but neither of the deportable offenses made him ineligible for cancellation of removal. Cancellation of removal is granted at the discretion of the government, but eligibility is governed by statute. Under the stop time rule, the seven years continuous residence required to meet the eligibility requirements is stopped when the noncitizen commits an offense "referred to in section 1182(a)(2) of this title that renders the alien inadmissible to the United States". This makes a noncitizen categorically ineligible for cancellation of removal.

The immigration judge decided Barton was categorically ineligible under the cancellation of removal statute because he was convicted of aggravated assault six and a half years after being admitted to the country. The Eleventh Circuit Court of Appeals agreed with the Board of Immigration Appeals.

== Opinion of the Court ==
The United States Supreme Court affirmed the Court of Appeals decision.

=== Kavanaugh's majority opinion ===
Justice Brett Kavanaugh, writing the majority opinion, ruled that DHS could deport Barton stating "the immigration laws enacted by Congress do not allow cancellation of removal when a lawful permanent resident has amassed a criminal record of this kind."

The Court rejected Barton's argument that a lawful permanent residents are subject to removal from the country only when they commit §1227(a)(2) offenses. Because the statutory text of the cancellation of removal statute only refers to §1182(a)(2) offenses the Court concludes that "Barton's interpretation of the statute is incorrect":

Congress has in turn made that status—inadmissibility because of conviction or other proof of commission of §1182(a)(2) offenses—relevant in several statutory contexts that apply to lawfully admitted noncitizens such as Barton...In those contexts, the noncitizen faces immigration consequences from being convicted of a §1182(a)(2) offense even though the noncitizen is lawfully admitted and is not necessarily removable solely because of that offense.

These other statutory contexts "pose a major hurdle for Barton’s textual argument" because they show that Congress has intended for lawfully admitted noncitizens to suffer immigration consequences, in some circumstances, if they have committed §1182(a)(2) crimes, even though they are not all deportable offenses.

=== Sotomayor's dissent ===
In a dissenting opinion, Justice Sonia Sotomayor argued that as Barton had already been admitted, the Government must prove he is deportable rather than just inadmissible. She said Barton had a strong case for a "cancellation of removal" because of his family ties in the US, long residency from a young age, and continuous residency for seven years as required by §1229b(a).
