= Lomax v. Ortiz-Marquez =

- Supreme Court of the United States

Argued February 26, 2020 Decided June 8, 2020
- Full case name: Arthur James Lomax v. Christina Ortiz-Marquez; Natasha Kindred; Danny Dennis; Mary Quintana
- Docket no.: 18-8369
- Citations: 590 U.S. 595 (more)
- Argument: Oral argument

Case history
- Prior: Case No. 17-1016, (D.C. No. 1:16-CV-02833-LTB) (D.Colo.), Case No. 18-1250, (D.C. No. 1:18-CV-00321-GPG-LTB) (D. Colorado)

Holding
- In regards to prisoners filing to proceed in forma pauperis, cases dismissed without prejudice for failure to state a claim count as "strikes" in the "three strike system" under 28 U.S.C § 1915(g), which bars prisoners from requesting waiver of fees after three cases of frivolous nature or if they fail to state a claim.

Court membership
- Chief Justice John Roberts Associate Justices Clarence Thomas · Ruth Bader Ginsburg; Stephen Breyer · Samuel Alito; Sonia Sotomayor · Elena Kagan; Neil Gorsuch · Brett Kavanaugh

Case opinion
- Majority: Kagan, joined by Roberts, Ginsburg, Breyer, Alito, Sotomayor, Gorsuch, Kavanaugh, Thomas (in all but Footnote 4)

Laws applied
- Prison Litigation Reform Act

Arthur James Lomax v. Christina Ortiz-Marquez et al., 590 U.S. 595 (2020) was a Supreme Court case in which the court held that in situations and proceedings in which a prisoner is filing to proceed in forma pauperis, as it pertains to the "3 strikes" system set out in 28 U.S.C. § 1915(g), a dismissal without prejudice counts for failure to state a claim counts as a "strike." The court held this in a unanimous decision, although Justice Thomas joined the majority in all but Footnote 4 of the opinion.

== Historical Context ==
=== Colorado Courts ===
Arthur James Lomax was tried in Colorado and convicted by a jury in 2006 for sexual assault, unlawful sexual contact, and misdemeanor sexual assault. The Colorado judge in that case sentenced Lomax to six years to life for sexual assault, and a one-year concurrent sentence for the other two counts. Lomax immediately appealed to the Colorado Court of Appeals, which vacated the sexual contact charge but affirmed the other two counts. Lomax then petitioned for a writ of certiorari to the Colorado Supreme Court which was denied on March 8, 2010. After several more appeals, Lomax finally appealed to the U.S. District Court for Colorado, which on March 1, 2012, promptly rejected all of his claims and denied his request for a certificate of appealability based on the timeliness of Lomax's appeal.

=== U.S. District Courts ===
Lomax then proceeded to file the first of three lawsuits, first in Lomax v. AVCF Ivette Ruiz et al., 1:13-cv-00707, (D. Colo.) against several officials of the Arkansas Valley Correctional Facility ('AVCF') and of the Fremont Correctional Facility ('FCF'), but was dismissed on the basis of Heck v. Humphrey, 512 U.S. 477 (1994), secondly in Lomax v. Hoffman et al., 1:13-cv-02131, (D. Colo.) against the judge who tried his case, but was also dismissed based on Heck, and thirdly, in Lomax v. Hoffman et al., 1:13-cv-03296, (D. Colo.) again against his judge and former Colorado Department of Corrections executive director Rick Raemisch.

These three cases culminated into Lomax's next suit in Lomax v. Raemisch et al., 1:18-cv-00321, (D. Colo.), where the District Court rejected his request to proceed in forma pauperis on November 13, 2018. The name of Ortiz-Marquez comes from a prison official from Lomax's last lawsuit. Lomax appealed, but lost his appeal once more, at which point he finally appealed to the Supreme Court.

== Supreme Court Decision ==
On October 18, 2019, the Supreme Court granted Lomax's petition for certiorari, held oral arguments on February 26, 2020, and announced its decision on June 8, 2020. In a unanimous decision the Supreme Court ruled in favor for Marquez.

Justice Elena Kagan wrote the majority, in which all Justices joined, except Justice Clarence Thomas in Footnote 4 of the majority opinion. The context behind Footnote 4 reads as follows:

"This case begins, and pretty much ends, with the text of Section 1915(g). Under that provision, a prisoner accrues a strike for any action “dismissed on the ground[] that it . . . fails to state a claim upon which relief may be granted.” That broad language covers all such dismissals: It applies to those issued both with and without prejudice to a plaintiff ’s ability to reassert his claim in a later action.^{4"}

Footnote 4 itself read as follows:

4. Note, however, that the provision does not apply when a court gives a plaintiff leave to amend his complaint. Courts often take that path if there is a chance that amendment can cure a deficient complaint. See Fed. Rule Civ. Proc. 15(a) (discussing amendments to pleadings). In that event, because the suit continues, the court’s action falls outside of Section 1915(g) and no strike accrues. See Brief for Respondents 31–35 (noting that flexible amendment practices “ensure that potentially meritorious prisoner suits are not hastily dismissed with a strike”); Brief for United States as Amicus Curiae 27–28 (similar); Tr. of Oral Arg. 32–34, 44 (similar).

The decision seemed to have been very easy for the Court, with the opinion sounding sort of informal, and the court essentially refuted all of Lomax's claims. The Court seemed to have only taken the case to resolve a circuit split, which was reinforced by the majority opinion saying,

"The Courts of Appeals have long divided over whether a dismissal without prejudice for failure to state a claim qualifies as a strike under Section 1915(g).3 In line with our duty to call balls and strikes, we granted certiorari to resolve the split, 589 U. S. ___ (2019), and we now affirm."

== See also ==
- Coleman v. Tollefson
