= Comcast v. National Association of African-American-Owned Media =

Comcast Corp. v. National Association of African American-Owned Media
- Supreme Court of the United States

Argued November 13, 2019 Decided March 23, 2020
- Full case name: Comcast Corporation v. National Association of African American-Owned Media, et al.
- Docket no.: 18-1171
- Citations: 589 U.S. ___ (more) 140 S. Ct. 1009; 206 L. Ed. 2d 356
- Argument: Oral argument

Case history
- Prior: Motion to dismiss granted, Nat'l Ass'n of African-American Owned Media v. Comcast Corp., No. 2:15-cv-01239, 2016 WL 11652073 (C.D. Cal. Oct. 5, 2016); reversed, 743 Fed. Appx. 106 (9th Cir. 2018).

Holding
- A §1981 plaintiff bears the burden of showing that the plaintiff's race was a but-for cause of its injury, and that burden remains constant over the life of the lawsuit.

Court membership
- Chief Justice John Roberts Associate Justices Clarence Thomas · Ruth Bader Ginsburg; Stephen Breyer · Samuel Alito; Sonia Sotomayor · Elena Kagan; Neil Gorsuch · Brett Kavanaugh

Case opinions
- Majority: Gorsuch, joined by Roberts, Thomas, Breyer, Alito, Sotomayor, Kagan, Kavanaugh; Ginsburg (except for the footnote)
- Concurrence: Ginsburg (in part and in the judgment)

Laws applied
- 42 U.S.C. § 1981

Comcast v. National Association of African-American-Owned Media, 589 U.S. ___ (2020), is a United States Supreme Court case related to protections against racial discrimination in the Civil Rights Act of 1866. The case relates to whether cable television operator Comcast engaged in racial discrimination in refusing to carry channels from Entertainment Studios, a minority-owned network founded by Byron Allen. In a unanimous opinion in March 2020, the Court ruled that under the Civil Rights Act, Allen was burdened to show that race was the sole reason Comcast failed to enter into a contract with his network. The parties reached a settlement after the Court's decision.

== Background ==
Byron Allen founded Entertainment Studios in 1993 originally to produce syndicated television shows, but eventually grew to include a number of lifestyle channels. Since as recent as 2014, Allen started negotiations with Comcast to have the cable provider run Entertainment Studio's lifestyle channels, but they could not agree to contract terms. Allen filed a lawsuit (filed under both Allen's National Association of African-American-Owned Media and Entertainment Studios) in the United States District Court for the Central District of California against Comcast in February 2015, seeking US$20 billion in damages and citing that Comcast had used racial discrimination to deny him a contract, in violation of section 1981 of the Civil Rights Act of 1866. Allen alleged that Comcast was discriminating against 100%-minority owned networks like Entertainment Studios, as only US$3 million of the total US$11 billion carriage fees Comcast paid were to 100%-minority owned networks. Comcast refuted the accusations, stating they had been in negotiations with Allen in good faith for several years to strike a deal. Comcast claimed that the lawsuit was "an ordinary business grievance masquerading as a racial discrimination claim".

Around the time of this filing, Comcast was in the midst of trying to acquire Time Warner, and Time Warner had been named in Allen's suit, but by April 2015, Comcast called off its acquisition. Allen also named several other groups including the NAACP, the National Urban League, the National Action Network, Al Sharpton and Meredith Attwell Baker, arguing that they had supported Comcast's earlier 2011 merger with NBCUniversal through a memorandum of understanding (MOU), in which Allen claimed was to "whitewash Comcast’s discriminatory business practices".

In the Comcast case, Judge Terry Hatter at the District Court had dismissed the case without prejudice in August 2015, stating that Allen had "failed to allege a plausible claim for relief", but later allowed Allen to refile an amended complaint. Allen's revised complain left only Comcast and Time-Warner as the defendants, but still asserted racial discrimination related to the MOU that had been signed earlier. By May 2016, Hatter had again dismissed Allen's suit for the lack of claim of relief, but allowed Allen to file a second amended claim.

=== Simultaneous cases ===
Allen had launched a similar lawsuit in December 2014 against AT&T, which owned DirecTV, but this was settled out of court by the end of 2015, with AT&T agreeing to pick up Allen's channels. Allen also filed a US$10 billion lawsuit against Charter Communications in January 2016, also in the Central District Court of California. The Charter case was approved of by Judge George H. Wu, finding that Allen had provided sufficient claims for potential discrimination.

=== Ninth Circuit appeal ===
Allen had appealed the ruling in the Comcast case to the Ninth Circuit, while Charter had done the same for its case. In November 2018, the Ninth Circuit overturned the Comcast case dismissal and rejected the Charter's request to dismiss, stating that, in the case of the Charter decision, "Plaintiffs' allegations regarding Charter's treatment of Entertainment Studios, and its differing treatment of white-owned companies, are sufficient to state a viable claim." The Ninth Circuit rejected arguments made by Comcast and Charter that they had "editorial discretion" to select channels for their cable line-ups under the First Amendment.

== Supreme Court ==
Comcast petitioned the Supreme Court of the United States for writ of certiorari to challenge the Ninth Circuit's decision, which the Court granted in June 2019. (Charter separately filed its own petition to the Supreme Court in March 2019, which as of November 2019 remains at the petition stage, and thus not joined with the Comcast case.)

Oral arguments for the case were heard on November 13, 2019. The arguments focused on which of two tests to use to determine the merits of Allen's case that had been considered in the case's prior legal history. The first was whether there was evidence that race was a "motivating factor" in Comcast's decision to deny entering a contract with Allen, which had been used by the Ninth Circuit. This took into account the language of the Comcast/NBCUniversal MOU that Allen claimed established Comcast's motivation. The other "but-for" test was suggested by Comcast, in that if there was no race issue involved, that Comcast would still not have entered a deal with Allen.

The Court released its opinion on March 23, 2020. In a unanimous decision vacating the decision of the Ninth Circuit and remanding the case to be reheard, the Court sided with Comcast's "but-for" test, in that Allen had to have shown that race was the sole deciding factor for the case, rather than the possibility that it may have only been a motivating factor. The decision was based on prior rulings from University of Texas Southwestern Medical Center v. Nassar. Justice Neil Gorsuch wrote the majority opinion joined by all but Justice Ruth Bader Ginsburg, who wrote a concurrence in part that concurred in the judgement. Ginsburg specifically wrote to counter Comcast's claims that such discrimination can only be only evaluated at the finalization of contract, as such discrimination could occur at any time during contract negotiations, such as when a bank requests letters of reference for a potential lender. Ginsburg also wrote, as a footnote, of having stated her past concern that "a strict but-for causation standard is ill suited to discrimination cases and inconsistent with tort principles" but recognized it was an established principle from past Supreme Court cases.

== Impact ==
Civil rights organizations and leaders have condemned Comcast for its behavior in the case. In the weeks leading to the oral arguments at the Supreme Court, Representative Bobby Rush argued that Comcast should be broken up, stating "Comcast has enjoyed the largesse – as has the cable industry, in general – of the African-American and other minority communities and has reached such prominence that it now disregard [sic] these communities with a cold, callous corporate insensitivity that is stultifying, arrogant, harmful, and intensely painful."

Ian Millhiser of Vox said of the Supreme Court decision that it represented a change in the liberal justices' stance of the court to approach discrimination cases through a mixed motive discrimination, as previously set out in Price Waterhouse v. Hopkins, which gave plaintiffs seeking discrimination a greater benefit of the doubt than the "but-for" ruling from Comcast. Millhiser referred to the cases of Gross v. FBL Financial Services, Inc. and University of Texas Southwestern Medical Center v. Nassar as cases since Price Waterhouse that went against the mixed motive allowance. Millhiser suggested that the liberal side of the court may have given in to the conservative majority in Comcast to establish that the liberal side of the court was respecting the principle of stare decisis from previous court decisions such that the conservative side should also uphold stare decisis in other pending decisions.

In June 2020, Allen and Comcast reached a settlement to end the lawsuit, with Comcast agreeing to carry three of the channels in Allen's lineup in addition to the Weather Channel which Allen had acquired in the interim, in addition to other terms.

In Allen's concurrent action against Charter Communications in the United States District Court for the Central District of California, Judge George H. Wu ruled in August 2020 that Allen's suit could proceed based on evidence Allen had provided that met the requirements by the Supreme Court in the Comcast ruling.
