= McKinney v. Arizona =

- Supreme Court of the United States

Argued December 11, 2019 Decided February 25, 2020
- Full case name: James Erin McKinney v. State of Arizona
- Docket no.: 18-1109
- Citations: 589 U.S. 139 (more)
- Argument: Oral argument

Holding
- A state appellate court may reweigh mitigating evidence after an Eddings error is identified.

Court membership
- Chief Justice John Roberts Associate Justices Clarence Thomas · Ruth Bader Ginsburg; Stephen Breyer · Samuel Alito; Sonia Sotomayor · Elena Kagan; Neil Gorsuch · Brett Kavanaugh

Case opinions
- Majority: Kavanaugh, joined by Roberts, Thomas, Alito, Gorsuch
- Dissent: Ginsburg, joined by Breyer, Sotomayor, Kagan

Laws applied
- Eighth Amendment

McKinney v. Arizona, 589 U.S. 139 (2020), is a Supreme Court of the United States decision in which the court held that an appellate court—not a jury—must reweigh the mitigating and aggravating factors in a death-penalty habeas corpus case after an Eddings error is identified. An Eddings error is when a person deciding a sentence in a capital punishment does not consider all mitigating evidence.

== Background ==
James Erin McKinney

Charles Michael Hedlund

James Erin McKinney (born June 4, 1967), along with his half-brother Charles Michael Hedlund (born November 22, 1964), committed two counts of burglary which resulted in two deaths. After being prosecuted by the State of Arizona, McKinney was found guilty of two counts of First Degree Murder. At sentencing, a psychologist testified that he had diagnosed McKinney with post-traumatic stress disorder, with the sentencing judge stating that McKinney's childhood was “beyond the comprehension of most people.” Arizona state law prevented the judge from considering this as it had no direct relevance to the crime and McKinney was thus sentenced to death.

On appeal in 2018, the Arizona Supreme Court upheld the death sentence. It was then appealed to the United States Supreme Court over disagreements on whether a judge or jury should resentence the defendant. As of April 2021, both McKinney and Hedlund are among 20 Arizona death row inmates who have exhausted all their appeals.

== Legal background ==
In Clemons v. Mississippi (1990), a Mississippi jury sentenced the defendant to death after finding two aggravating circumstances. After the Supreme Court of Mississippi determined that one of the aggravating circumstances was unconstitutionally vague, the defendant argued that he was entitled to a new sentencing proceeding before a jury so that it could weigh the permissible aggravating and mitigating evidence. The U.S. Supreme Court disagreed, holding that the state appellate court could itself reweigh the permissible evidence.

== Supreme Court ==
=== Decision ===
The Court ruled 5–4 that the state appellate court may reweigh the mitigating factors the same as aggravating factors: "In short, a Clemons reweighing is a permissible remedy for an Eddings error."

McKinney's separate argument based on Ring v. Arizona (2002) and Hurst v. Florida (2016) concerned the initial finding of the aggravating circumstances that made him eligible for the death penalty, rather than the subsequent weighing of aggravating and mitigating circumstances. McKinney pointed out that a jury had not found the aggravating circumstances, as Ring and Hurst later required. The Court rejected this argument, concluding that the Arizona Supreme Court's 2018 reweighing had occurred on collateral review, not direct review. The state court had characterized the proceeding as a collateral proceeding under Arizona law, and the Court explained that it would not second-guess that characterization of state law.

McKinney maintained that a Clemons reweighing was a sentencing proceeding and therefore could occur only on direct review, or upon reopening of direct review. The Court rejected this view, noting that Clemons v. Mississippi (1990), over a vigorous dissent, had stated that appellate reweighing was not a sentencing proceeding that had to be conducted by a jury.

=== Ginsburg's dissent ===
Justice Ruth Bader Ginsburg, joined by Justices Stephen Breyer, Sonia Sotomayor, and Elena Kagan, dissented. She explained that new rules of constitutional law apply to cases on direct review under Griffith v. Kentucky (1987), but generally do not apply retroactively to cases on collateral review under Teague v. Lane (1989), subject to two exceptions. The Court had already determined that Ring v. Arizona (2002) did not fall within those exceptions in Schriro v. Summerlin (2004). Ginsburg therefore identified the central question as whether McKinney's case was on direct or collateral review. She concluded that the Arizona Supreme Court's 2018 proceeding was direct in character and would therefore have applied Ring, requiring the Court to reverse the Arizona Supreme Court's judgment and find McKinney's death sentences unconstitutional.
