= Nasrallah v. Barr =

2020 United States Supreme Court case

- Supreme Court of the United States

Argued March 2, 2020 Decided June 1, 2020
- Full case name: Nidal Khalid Nasrallah v. William P. Barr, Attorney General
- Docket no.: 18-1432
- Citations: 590 U.S. 573 (more) 140 S. Ct. 1683

Case history
- Prior: Nasrallah v. U.S. Attorney Gen., 762 F. App'x 638 (11th Cir. 2019); cert. granted, 140 S. Ct. 428 (2019).

Holding
- The statutory limitations on judicial review of a final deportation order based on a noncitizen's commission of a crime do not preclude judicial review of a noncitizen's factual challenges to a Convention Against Torture order.

Court membership
- Chief Justice John Roberts Associate Justices Clarence Thomas · Ruth Bader Ginsburg; Stephen Breyer · Samuel Alito; Sonia Sotomayor · Elena Kagan; Neil Gorsuch · Brett Kavanaugh

Case opinions
- Majority: Kavanaugh, joined by Roberts, Ginsburg, Breyer, Sotomayor, Kagan, Gorsuch
- Dissent: Thomas, joined by Alito

Nasrallah v. Barr, 590 U.S. 573 (2020), was a United States Supreme Court case in which the Court ruled on the question of what appeals courts can review when determining whether a noncitizen who has committed a crime in the United States can be deported. It reversed the judgment of the U.S. Court of Appeals for the Eleventh Circuit.

== Background ==
Noncitizens convicted of certain crimes may face removal from the United States. If they can demonstrate a likelihood of torture if returned to their home country they may be granted relief under Article 2 of the Convention Against Torture (CAT). Aliens convicted of crimes are barred from making factual challenges to removal orders. The question in Nasrallah v. Barr was if they can make a factual challenge to appeal a denial of CAT relief.

Nidal Khalil Nasrallah, a citizen of Lebanon and lawful permanent resident of the United States, was ordered removed from the country after being convicted of receiving stolen property. Nasrallah applied for deferral of removal under the Convention Against Torture (CAT), arguing he would likely be tortured if returned to Lebanon.

An immigration judge found that Nasrallah had previously been tortured and likely would again if he was removed to Lebanon. The Board of Immigration Appeals (BIA) disagreed. Nasrallah then petitioned for review in the U.S. Court of Appeals for the Eleventh Circuit. The Eleventh Circuit dismissed his petition, holding it lacked jurisdiction to review factual challenges to CAT relief denials under the jurisdictional limitations in 8 U.S.C. § 1252(a)(2)(C).

There was a circuit split regarding whether judicial review of factual challenges to CAT orders is barred under § 1252(a)(2)(C). The Supreme Court granted certiorari to resolve a circuit split on this jurisdictional issue.

=== Statutes ===
- The Illegal Immigration Reform and Immigrant Responsibility Act (IIRIRA) authorizes review, in a consolidated proceeding at a court of appeals, of all challenges arising from a final order of removal.
- The Foreign Affairs Reform and Restructuring Act (FARRA) implements Article 3 of the Convention Against Torture and provides for judicial review of CAT claims "as part of the review of a final order of removal".
- The REAL ID Act of 2005 says final orders of removal and CAT orders may be reviewed only in the courts of appeals. This was a legislative response to INS v. St. Cyr.

== Supreme Court ==
=== Oral argument ===
The oral argument centered on whether the jurisdictional bar in 8 U.S.C. § 1252(a)(2)(C) also foreclosed review of factual challenges to denials of deferral of removal under the Convention Against Torture (CAT). Justice Samuel Alito raised the question whether the INA's zipper clause, § 1252(b)(9), required CAT claims to be considered only in reviewing the final order of removal, thereby subjecting them to the criminal-grounds bar. Counsel for Nasrallah maintained that § 1252(a)(4), which specifically provides for judicial review of CAT determinations, preserved review of those claims even when review of the underlying removal order was unavailable. He distinguished CAT deferral from cancellation of removal, explaining that the former postpones execution of a removal order without invalidating it.

The government's position that the CAT determination formed part of the final order of removal drew substantial questioning. Justice Neil Gorsuch challenged its consistency with the government's earlier position that CAT relief and the removal order were legally distinct. Justice Elena Kagan questioned the government's reliance on precedent predating the relevant statutory provisions and directed attention to the language of the statute. Justice Stephen Breyer considered the government's textual argument substantial but found Nasrallah's interpretation more persuasive in light of the statutory structure, legislative history, and presumption favoring judicial review. Justice Ruth Bader Ginsburg questioned whether the jurisdictional bar foreclosed CAT review despite the absence of clear language extending it to those cases. Justice Brett Kavanaugh questioned whether the government's position was consistent with Congress's decision to provide a separate avenue for reviewing CAT claims.

=== Decision ===
Writing for the Court, Justice Brett Kavanaugh held that "the court of appeals should review factual challenges to the CAT order deferentially".

The Court's analysis centered on interpreting seemingly conflicting provisions of immigration law. A final orders includes "all matters of which the validity of the final order is contingent". CAT orders do not affect the validity of a final order of removal. Therefore, they are reviewable "as part of the review of a final order of removal" under FARRA, and the zipper clause, without being subject to the same jurisdictional bar as a final order of removal.

=== Dissent ===
Justices Clarence Thomas and Alito argued the zipper clause barred judicial review because CAT claims arise from removal proceedings.
