= Holguin-Hernandez v. United States =

- Supreme Court of the United States

Argued December 10, 2019 Decided February 26, 2020
- Full case name: Gonzalo Holguin-Hernandez v. United States
- Docket no.: 18-7739
- Citations: 589 U.S. 169 (more)
- Argument: Oral argument
- Opinion announcement: Opinion announcement

Holding
- An argument for a specific, shorter sentence preserves an argument that a sentence imposed is unreasonably long for appeal.

Court membership
- Chief Justice John Roberts Associate Justices Clarence Thomas · Ruth Bader Ginsburg; Stephen Breyer · Samuel Alito; Sonia Sotomayor · Elena Kagan; Neil Gorsuch · Brett Kavanaugh

Case opinions
- Majority: Breyer, joined by unanimous
- Concurrence: Alito, joined by Gorsuch

Holguin-Hernandez v. United States, 589 U.S. 169 (2020) was a United States Supreme Court case.

== Case description ==
Holguin-Hernandez was convicted of drug charges and sentenced to 60 months in prison and 5 years of supervised release. The government requested that an additional sentence of 12 to 18 months in prison be imposed for violation of the conditions of the previous term. The district court accepted the request and imposed an additional 12-month sentence. The defendant appealed to the United States Court of Appeals for the Fifth Circuit and argued that the sentence was unreasonable as it was greater than the necessary sentence to accomplish its goals. The Court of Appeals found that he could not argue it was unreasonable because he didn't argue that before the District Court. Before the Supreme Court of the United States, the court ruled that the sentence imposed was "unreasonably long" and that the Federal Sentencing Guidelines were not mandatory for judges to follow.
