= United States v. Sineneng-Smith =

- Supreme Court of the United States

Argued February 25, 2020 Decided May 7, 2020
- Full case name: United States v. Evelyn Sineneng-Smith
- Docket no.: 19-67
- Citations: 590 U.S. 371 (more) 140 S. Ct. 1575

Case history
- Prior: Defendant convicted, No. C-10-00414 RMW, 2013 WL 6776188 (N.D. Cal.); Reversed, 910 F.3d 461 (9th Cir. 2018); cert. granted, 140 S. Ct. 36 (2019).
- Subsequent: Affirmed on remand, 982 F.3d 766 (9th Cir. 2020); cert. denied, 142 S. Ct. 117 (2021)

Holding
- A federal appeals court abuses its discretion when it goes beyond the questions and issues presented by a party.

Court membership
- Chief Justice John Roberts Associate Justices Clarence Thomas · Ruth Bader Ginsburg; Stephen Breyer · Samuel Alito; Sonia Sotomayor · Elena Kagan; Neil Gorsuch · Brett Kavanaugh

Case opinions
- Majority: Ginsburg, joined by unanimous
- Concurrence: Thomas

Laws applied
- Immigration and Nationality Act of 1952; First Amendment to the United States Constitution

United States v. Sineneng-Smith, 590 U.S. 371 (2020), was a case of the United States Supreme Court, in which the justices considered the constitutionality of 8 U.S.C. § 1324(a)(1)(A)(iv), a provision of the Immigration and Nationality Act of 1952 that criminalizes encouraging or inducing illegal immigration. The case attracted attention from civil liberties groups and immigration advocates, including the American Civil Liberties Union, the Immigrant Defense Project, and the National Lawyers Guild.

The case at lower courts had dealt with potential fraud committed by consultant Evelyn Sineneng-Smith in preparing paperwork for green card certification that she knew would never be approved. While Sineneng-Smith had argued that the basis of the specific clause of the Immigration and National Act violated her First Amendment rights at lower courts, when the case reached the Ninth Circuit Court of Appeals, the judges introduced the idea that the statute of convictions of that clause was overly broad under her First Amendment rights, an issue not brought by either party. The Ninth Circuit subsequently struck down the law as unconstitutional and overturned Sineneng-Smith's conviction.

At the Supreme Court, the unanimous decision in May 2020 vacated the Ninth Circuit's decision for violating the principle of party presentation established under Greenlaw v. United States, 554 U.S. 237 (2008). The Supreme Court remanded the case to the Ninth Circuit "for reconsideration shorn of the overbreadth inquiry interjected by the appellate panel and bearing a fair resemblance to the case shaped by the parties."

== Background ==
=== Legal history ===
The Immigration and Nationality Act of 1952, also known as the McCarran-Walter Act, was enacted to codify rules around naturalization and immigration law enforcement. Over the years, it has been amended several times, including in 1986 when a provision was added to make a crime the act of encouraging unauthorized immigration. This was codified in 8 U.S.C. § 1324(a)(1)(A)(iv), which states that it is an offense to:

[encourage] or [induce] an alien to come to, enter, or reside in the United States, knowing or in reckless disregard of the fact that such coming to, entry, or residence is or will be in violation of law...

=== Case information ===
From 1990 to 2008, Evelyn Sineneng-Smith operated an immigration consulting firm in San Jose, California, mostly catering to Filipino immigrants living and working in the United States. Sineneng-Smith assisted clients with applying for a "Labor Certification", which she told them was the first step in applying for a green card that would allow them to become lawful permanent residents in the United States. She charged each client a $6,800 retainer fee for her assistance in filing for the certification. In 2001, the "Labor Certification" program expired. Nevertheless, Sineneng-Smith persisted in signing up additional clients and accepting retainees fees even after learning that the labor certification process no longer existed.

In 2010, a grand jury indicted Sineneng-Smith on various charges, including mail fraud and violations of 8 U.S.C. § 1324(a)(1)(A)(iv) for encouraging or inducing unauthorized migrants to stay in the United States. According to prosecutors, she had defrauded nearly 2,000 immigrants and deposited over $3.3 million in payments from clients just from 2004 to 2007.

== In lower courts ==
Sineneng-Smith was tried in federal court in 2013 before Judge Ronald Whyte in the United States District Court for the Northern District of California on three counts of mail fraud and three counts of encouraging illegal immigration for financial gain. After a 12-day trial, the jury initially found her guilty on all counts. However, Judge Whyte directed a verdict of acquittal on two counts (one each of encouraging illegal immigration and mail fraud) due to insufficient evidence. She later pled guilty to two additional charges of filing false tax returns in 2002 and 2003. In 2015, she was sentenced to one year and six months in prison for encouraging illegal immigration, mail fraud, and submitting false tax returns; she also received a $15,000 fine, $43,550 of restitution, and three years' of supervised release.

Sineneng-Smith appealed her conviction to the United States Court of Appeals for the Ninth Circuit. A three-judge panel comprising Judges A. Wallace Tashima, Marsha Berzon, and Andrew Hurwitz heard oral arguments on her appeal in April 2017. In November, it took the unusual step of soliciting briefs from federal public defenders and immigrant rights groups on the question of whether the statute prohibiting encouraging illegal immigrants to enter or stay in the US was a violation of the First Amendment of the United States Constitution. In December 2018, it issued an order upholding Sineneng-Smith's mail fraud convictions but overturning her conviction on the charge of encouraging illegal immigration, stating that the statute criminalizes constitutionally protected speech.

The federal government appealed the Ninth Circuit's ruling to the Supreme Court, which granted the government's petition for a writ of certiorari in October 2019, agreeing to hear the case.

== Supreme Court ==
The Court heard oral arguments in February 2020, and released its opinion on May 7, 2020.

The unanimous opinion of the Court, written by Justice Ruth Bader Ginsburg, held that the Circuit Court had committed an abuse of discretion by overstepping its bounds by "drastic departure from the principle of party presentation constituted an abuse of discretion", instead of "adjudicating the case presented", as established in Greenlaw v. United States, 554 U.S. 237 (2008). Ginsburg wrote: "Courts are essentially passive instruments of government. They do not, or should not, sally forth each day looking for wrongs to right. They wait for cases to come to them, and when cases arise, courts normally decide only questions presented by the parties...No extraordinary circumstances justified the panel’s takeover of the appeal." The Ninth Circuit's judgement was vacated and the case remanded back to lower courts. Justice Clarence Thomas filed a concurrence concerning the overbreadth doctrine relied on by the Ninth Circuit, which he thought should be revisited.

== Law review commentary ==
Two law review articles teased out the implications of Sineneng-Smith: a Note in the Harvard Law Review, and an article by Zachary B. Pohlman in the Federal Courts Law Review, the latter of which questions both the scope of an enforceable party presentation principle and the Court's power to enforce lower court violations of the principle.
