= Intel Corp. Investment Policy Committee v. Sulyma =

- Supreme Court of the United States

Argued December 4, 2019 Decided February 26, 2020
- Full case name: Intel Corporation Investment Policy Committee, et al., Petitioners v. Christopher M. Sulyma, Respondent
- Docket no.: 18-1116
- Citations: 589 U.S. ___ (more) 140 S. Ct. 768; 206 L. Ed. 2d 103
- Argument: Oral argument
- Opinion announcement: Opinion announcement

Case history
- Prior: Summary judgement granted in favor of Intel, Sulyma v. Intel Corp. Inv. Policy Comm., No. 5:15-cv-04977, 2017 WL 1217185 (N.D. Cal. Mar. 31, 2017); Reversed and remanded, 909 F.3d 1069 (9th Cir. 2018); Cert. granted, 139 S. Ct. 2692 (2019)

Holding
- Under the requirement in the Employee Retirement Income Security Act of 1974 that plaintiffs with actual knowledge of an alleged fiduciary breach must file suit within three years of gaining that knowledge, a plaintiff does not necessarily have actual knowledge of the information contained in disclosures that he receives but does not read or cannot recall reading.

Court membership
- Chief Justice John Roberts Associate Justices Clarence Thomas · Ruth Bader Ginsburg; Stephen Breyer · Samuel Alito; Sonia Sotomayor · Elena Kagan; Neil Gorsuch · Brett Kavanaugh

Case opinion
- Majority: Alito, joined by unanimous

Laws applied
- Employee Retirement Income Security Act of 1974

Intel Corp. Investment Policy Committee v. Sulyma, 589 U.S. ___ (2020), was a United States Supreme Court case in which the court held that, for purposes of the requirement in the Employee Retirement Income Security Act of 1974, that plaintiffs with "actual knowledge" of an alleged fiduciary breach file suit within three years of gaining that knowledge, a plaintiff does not necessarily have "actual knowledge" of the information contained in disclosures that he receives but does not read or cannot recall reading.

== Oral argument & decision ==
Intel argued that "actual knowledge" meant that the person just got the information and didn't have to actually do anything to qualify under "actual knowledge" clause for the 3-year protection instead of the 6-year protection. The Supreme Court unanimously rejected that argument, arguing that "actual knowledge" meant that the person read and could recall the document.

Sulyma argued that "actual knowledge" under the 6-year plan qualified because he didn't read the document until after the 3-year protection had ended, and because he got less information than the Department of Labor, it would fully qualify for 6-year protection.

The Supreme Court unanimously ruled in favor of Sulyma, ruling that "actual knowledge" meant that the person read and was able to recall the facts. The court affirmed the decision of the United States Court of Appeals for the Ninth Circuit.

== Lower court rulings ==
The United States District Court for the Northern District of California ruled in favor of Intel, the Court argued that "actual knowledge" meant that the person got the information and didn't have to read or know about it for the 3-year protection to begin.

Sulyma filed an appeal with the United States Court of Appeals for the Ninth Circuit, who reversed the decision and remanded the case. The court argued that "actual knowledge" meant that the person read and could successfully recall the information presented to them and that the information was including all necessary information.
