= Guerrero-Lasprilla v. Barr =

- Supreme Court of the United States

Argued December 9, 2019 Decided March 23, 2020
- Full case name: Guerrero-Lasprilla v. Barr
- Docket no.: 18-776
- Citations: 589 U.S. ___ (more) 140 S. Ct. 1062; 206 L. Ed. 2d 271
- Argument: Oral argument
- Opinion announcement: Opinion announcement

Case history
- Prior: Guerrero-Lasprilla v. Sessions, 737 F. App'x 230 (5th Cir. 2018); Ovalles v. Holder, 577 F.3d 288 (5th Cir. 2009); Ovalles v. Sessions, 741 F. App'x 259 (5th Cir. 2018); Cert. granted, 139 S. Ct. 2766 (2019)

Holding
- The statutory phrase "questions of law" includes the application of a legal standard to facts when those facts are undisputed.

Court membership
- Chief Justice John Roberts Associate Justices Clarence Thomas · Ruth Bader Ginsburg; Stephen Breyer · Samuel Alito; Sonia Sotomayor · Elena Kagan; Neil Gorsuch · Brett Kavanaugh

Case opinions
- Majority: Breyer, joined by Roberts, Ginsburg, Sotomayor, Kagan, Gorsuch, Kavanaugh
- Dissent: Thomas, joined by Alito (all but Part II–A–1)

Guerrero-Lasprilla v. Barr, 589 U.S. ___ (2020), was a United States Supreme Court case in which the court held that The statutory phrase "questions of law" includes the application of a legal standard to facts when those facts are undisputed.

== Background ==
When a non-citizen facing deportation has "committed certain crimes", 8 U.S.C. § 1252 allows judicial review only for "constitutional claims or questions of law".

Pedro Pablo Guerrero-Lasprilla and Ruben Ovalles became removable from the United States upon conviction for drug crimes. The petitioners asked the board to reopen their removal proceedings after the 90-day time limit, and argued that the time limit should be equitably tolled. The board denied their requests, and the Fifth Circuit said the application of the due diligence standard was a question of fact. The petitioners disagreed; according to them, the underlying facts were not in dispute.

The Supreme Court granted certiorari. The question before the Court was, "Is a request for equitable tolling, as it applies to statutory motions to reopen, judicially reviewable as a question of law?"

== Supreme Court ==
=== Decision ===
In a 7–2 decision written by Justice Breyer, the court ruled that the statutory phrase "questions of law" includes the application of a legal standard to facts when those facts are undisputed. The government argued that Congress intended to exclude mixed questions from judicial review. The court disagreed and concluding that the request for equitable tolling was judicially reviewable as a question of law, the court vacated and remanded the case.

=== Dissent ===
Justice Clarence Thomas wrote a dissent that was joined in part by Samuel Alito. Thomas said the majority "flouts both the text and structure of the statute" because the application of due diligence is an "equitable, often fact-intensive" inquiry. Therefore, in the view taken by the dissent, the majority decision "expand[s] the scope of judicial review well past the boundaries set by Congress."

== Subsequent developments ==
After Patel v. Garland circuit courts began hearing cases about whether hardship determinations in cancellation of removal cases are a mixed question of law and fact, and so reviewable under Guerrero-Lasprilla, reaching conflicting results. In Wilkinson v. Garland the Supreme Court ruled that federal courts could review these decisions.
