= Immigration and Naturalization Service v. St. Cyr =

INS v. St. Cyr
- Supreme Court of the United States

Argued April 24, 2001 Decided June 25, 2001
- Full case name: Immigration and Naturalization Service v. Enrico St. Cyr
- Citations: 533 U.S. 289 (more) 121 S. Ct. 2271; 150 L. Ed. 2d 347, 2001 U.S. LEXIS 4670

Case history
- Prior: Dunbar v. INS, 64 F. Supp. 2d 47 (D. Conn. 1999); aff'd sub nom., St. Cyr v INS, 229 F.3d 406 (2d Cir. 2000); cert. granted, 531 U.S. 1107 (2001).

Holding
- 1. AEDPA and IIRIRA did not divest district courts of their jurisdiction under the general habeas corpus statute.; 2. Aliens who pleaded guilty to criminal charges that rendered them deportable prior to the effective date of AEDPA and IIRIRA remain eligible for discretionary relief from deportation.

Court membership
- Chief Justice William Rehnquist Associate Justices John P. Stevens · Sandra Day O'Connor; Antonin Scalia · Anthony Kennedy; David Souter · Clarence Thomas; Ruth Bader Ginsburg · Stephen Breyer

Case opinions
- Majority: Stevens, joined by Kennedy, Souter, Ginsburg, Breyer
- Dissent: O'Connor
- Dissent: Scalia, joined by Rehnquist, Thomas; O'Connor (Parts I and III)

Laws applied
- 28 U.S.C. §§ 2241–2255

Immigration and Naturalization Service v. St. Cyr, 533 U.S. 289 (2001), is a United States Supreme Court case involving habeas corpus and INA § 212(c) relief (repealed 1997) for deportable aliens.

== Background ==
Enrico St. Cyr, a Haitian citizen, had been a lawful permanent resident (LPR) of the United States for ten years when he pleaded guilty to a controlled substance violation in Connecticut and became "deportable" under the Immigration and Nationality Act (INA).

The U.S. Attorney General had broad discretion under § 212(c) of the INA to waive the deportation of certain LPRs. The Antiterrorism and Effective Death Penalty Act of 1996 (AEDPA) and Illegal Immigration Reform and Immigrant Responsibility Act of 1996 (IIRIRA), disqualified most criminal aliens.

St. Cyr pled guilty on March 8, 1996, prior to the enactment of AEDPA and IIRIRA, and had removal proceedings brought against him on April 10, 1997, after the enactment of these Acts. U.S. Attorney General John Ashcroft argued that AEDPA and IIRIRA stripped him of the authority to grant any St. Cyr any waiver.

St. Cyr filed a petition for habeas corpus in the district court. He conceded that he was deportable but argued that he was eligible for discretionary relief. The U.S. District for the District of Connecticut accepted jurisdiction and agreed that the new restrictions on waivers do not apply to removal proceedings brought against an LPR who pleaded guilty to a deportable crime before the enactment of AEDPA and IIRIRA. The U.S. Court of Appeals for the Second Circuit affirmed.

== Supreme Court ==
The Supreme Court answered two questions. The first was procedural: Does 8 U.S.C. § 1252(a)(2)(C) (as modified by AEDPA and IIRIRA) strip federal courts of 28 U.S.C. § 2241 habeas corpus jurisdiction to decide a question of law. The substantive question was whether the new law applied retroactively for individuals convicted before the amendments took effect.

Justice John Paul Stevens wrote the majority opinion, joined by Anthony Kennedy, David Souter, Ruth Bader Ginsburg and Stephen Breyer. Sandra Day O'Connor dissented, joined by Antonin Scalia, Clarence Thomas and William Rehnquist.

=== Decision ===
In a 5-4 opinion, Justice John Paul Stevens wrote for the majority stating that Congress did not intend to strip the federal district courts of their authority to decide habeas challenges, and that the AEDPA and IIRIRA did not deny relief under INA § 212(c) to LPRs who would have been eligible for such relief at the time of their convictions.

Stevens reasoned that the Supreme Court should interpret statutes to avoid constitutional issues:

If it were clear that the question of law could be answered in another judicial forum, it might be permissible to accept the INS’ reading of § 1252. But the absence of such a forum, coupled with the lack of a clear, unambiguous and express statement of congressional intent to preclude judicial consideration on habeas of such an important question of law, strongly counsels against adopting a construction that would raise serious constitutional questions

The INS argued that the 1996 statutes had stripped federal courts of habeas jurisdiction. The Court said this would violate even a minimalist reading of the Suspension Clause: "[Even] assuming the Suspension Clause protects only the writ as it existed in 1789, there is substantial evidence to support the proposition that pure questions of law like the one raised by the respondent in this case could have been answered in 1789 by a common-law judge with power to issue the writ of habeas corpus."

Citing Swain v. Pressley the court recognized, in a footnote, that "Congress could, without raising any constitutional questions, provide an adequate substitute through the courts of appeals".

The Court said St. Cyr correctly sought review of the Attorney General's retroactivity decision in district court. St. Cyr's challenge to the retroactive application of the 1996 statutes was a pure question of law that was within the scope of a 28 U.S.C. § 2241 habeas action. Before AEDPA and IIRIRA, § 212(c) relief was common enough that it "would have been one of the principal benefits sought by defendant deciding whether to accept a plea offer", as St. Cyr did. The Court concluded that Congress did not intend for the changes to have retroactive effect.

== Subsequent developments ==
Congress responded to the court's decision in St. Cyr by adding a new provision to the statute, 8 U.S.C. § 1252(a)(2)(D), which created an exception to the jurisdiction-stripping provision specifically for "questions of law". In Guerrero-Lasprilla v. Barr the court ruled that mixed questions of law and fact count as "questions of law" under 1252(a)(2)(D).

== See also ==
- List of United States Supreme Court cases, volume 533
- List of United States Supreme Court cases
