= Carey R. Dunne =

American attorney

Carey Dunne
- Born: Springfield, Massachusetts, U.S.
- Education: Oberlin College (BA); Harvard University (JD)

Carey R. Dunne is an American attorney. He is known for leading the criminal investigation of Donald Trump for the office of the Manhattan District Attorney until his resignation from the case, alongside his colleague Mark F. Pomerantz, in February 2022. In that role, Dunne successfully argued Trump v. Vance before the United States Supreme Court in May 2020; the court held that President Trump was required to comply with a state grand jury subpoena for his tax returns. Prior to his service at the DA's Office, Dunne was a longtime partner at Davis Polk & Wardwell, where he specialized in white collar criminal defense. Dunne is a past president of the New York City Bar Association.

In January 2023, Dunne co-founded Free and Fair Litigation Group, a non-profit law firm focused on countering the rise of authoritarianism in America by bringing and defending constitutional cases.

== Early life and education ==
Dunne was born in Springfield, Massachusetts. He received a B.A. from Oberlin College in 1980 and a J.D. from Harvard Law School in 1984.

== Career ==
=== Early career in public service ===
After graduating from Harvard Law School, Dunne joined the office of the Manhattan District Attorney Robert Morgenthau as an Assistant District Attorney. There, he served as a prosecutor in the office's Trial Division until he left in 1987 to join the firm of Davis Polk & Wardwell.

=== Career in private practice ===
Dunne's career at Davis Polk spanned three decades, and included election to the firm's three person global management committee, a position he held for nine years. He also chaired the firm's Litigation Department. Dunne specialized in representing individuals and companies in complex white collar criminal investigations. His clients included institutions such as Morgan Stanley, Credit Suisse, Deutsche Bank, Consolidated Edison, and the manufacturer of the Deepwater Horizon oil rig. His cases included investigations of financial frauds, international sanctions, environmental crimes, insider trading, antitrust violations, and commercial disputes.

While at Davis Polk, Dunne also maintained an active pro bono practice, which included serving as lead counsel in the murder trial of Lonnie Jones. Jones was exonerated by a jury of all charges after just two hours of deliberation, resulting in his immediate release after serving five years in prison for a crime he did not commit.

=== Return to public service ===
After nearly 30 years in private practice, Dunne retired from Davis Polk and rejoined the Manhattan District Attorney's office in January 2017 as General Counsel to DA Cyrus Vance Jr. Dunne and Vance were contemporaries in that office in the 1980s.

As general counsel, Dunne oversaw major investigations and cases for the DA's Office, such as People v. The Trump Organization and People v. Harvey Weinstein. He also supervised the office's Investigations Division, the Legislative Affairs Group, and the Conviction Integrity Program, which in November 2021 secured the exoneration of two men who had been wrongfully convicted of assassinating Malcolm X in 1965.

==== Trump Investigation ====
Dunne led the Manhattan DA's investigation of Donald J. Trump and related individuals and entities, which began in the summer of 2019. Prompted by a subpoena from the office to the accounting firm Mazars for Trump-related tax records, lawyers for Trump and related entities filed a series of objections in federal court beginning in September 2019 that led to an 18-month effort by the President to prevent the office from obtaining his tax records on constitutional grounds.

The case went twice to the Supreme Court. Dunne prevailed at oral argument twice in the Southern District of New York, twice in the Court of Appeals for the Second Circuit, and in the Supreme Court.

On May 12, 2020, Dunne argued before the U.S. Supreme court that President Trump was required to turn over his tax returns to the District Attorney in response to a subpoena directed to the President's tax accountants. The decision was described as “one of the most consequential prosecutorial decisions in U.S. history.” Because of the COVID-19 pandemic, the argument was one of the first ever to be conducted by telephone and to be broadcast live to the public.

On July 9, 2020, the Supreme Court ruled 7–2 in a 68-page opinion. The majority opinion, written by Chief Justice Roberts, held that a sitting president is not immune from legal process in a state grand jury investigation under Article II nor the Supremacy Clause of the Constitution. As a result of the decision, the DA's office obtained millions of pages of tax records from the President's tax accountants.

The case was then remanded to the District Court in the Southern District of New York for further arguments and proceedings. After further unsuccessful challenges by President Trump in the District Court and the Court of Appeals, on February 22, 2021, the Supreme Court declined to hear the case further, which led Dunne and his team to obtain the tax records from the Mazars accounting firm that afternoon.

On July 1, 2021, Dunne was the lead attorney to conduct the arraignment of the Trump Organization and its chief financial officer Allen Weisselberg upon a grand jury indictment for charges of criminal tax fraud in connection with a 15-year scheme to avoid the payment of income taxes. At state Supreme Court in Manhattan, Dunne described the charges to the court: “To put it bluntly, this was a sweeping and audacious illegal payments scheme.”

The case was adjourned for motions and eventual trial. In the meantime, the investigation into other criminal violations continued, led by Dunne and former federal prosecutor Mark Pomerantz, who had been recruited by Dunne and DA Cyrus Vance to help lead the effort.

In December 2021, the investigation led to a series of meetings in which Dunne and Pomerantz made the case to District Attorney Cyrus Vance that a grand jury indictment should be sought against Donald J. Trump, based on evidence that he had engaged in a years-long scheme to falsify his business records and deceive financial institutions and others about the value of his real estate holdings and his net worth. The District Attorney agreed with the recommendation and authorized Dunne and Pomerantz to present evidence to a grand jury with the intention of seeking such charges.

On January 1, 2022, as the grand jury presentation was underway, a new District Attorney, Alvin Bragg, took office. Bragg had been elected in November 2021 (Cyrus Vance had declined to run for re-election). After hearing a series of presentations by Dunne and Pomerantz about the Trump investigation in January and February 2022, Bragg informed Dunne and Pomerantz on February 22, 2022, that he disagreed with the earlier decision by Cyrus Vance, and that Dunne and Pomerantz should discontinue their presentation of evidence to the grand jury. In response, Dunne and Pomerantz both resigned from their positions the next day.

A resignation letter from Pomerantz to Bragg, which later became public, asserted that the investigation team had no doubt that Trump had committed crimes, and that the public interest warranted a prosecution without delay. (Dunne's resignation letter has not been made public.)

In the wake of the resignations, Bragg's office asserted that the investigation remained ongoing. However, on April 29, 2022, the New York Times reported that "new signs have emerged that the former president will not be indicted in Manhattan in the foreseeable future – if at all."

=== Fair and Free Litigation Group ===
In January 2023, Dunne co-founded Free and Fair Litigation Group with Mark Pomerantz and Michele Roberts. Free and Fair is a 501(c)-3 non-profit law firm focused on fighting authoritarianism in America by bringing and defending constitutional cases. The firm selects its cases based on their potential to create new laws that would safeguard democratic elections and constitutional principles. Dunne told the Washington Post: "We’re dealing with a whole national movement that is aimed at rolling back rights we’ve taken granted for generations."

The firm is non-partisan and focuses exclusively on the courts. The firm's model provides senior leadership in cases, in partnership with pro bono teams at major law firms and other non-profits nationwide. All of its services are provided on a pro bono basis. The group's founding principals also work without compensation.

As of August 2023, the firm's docket includes:

- A major lawsuit under the Voting Rights Act of 1965 against Governor Ron DeSantis and other Florida officials, alleging that the Governor and officials intimidated Floridian residents with prior felony convictions from exercising their right to vote
- A constitutional challenge to Tennessee's 'prohibited concepts' statute, which attempts to prohibit public school teachers from discussing issues related to racism, implicit bias, sexuality, the Civil War and other topics in their classrooms
- The defense of four jurisdictions in Colorado against a Second Amendment challenge to the jurisdictions' right to ban assault weapons within their borders

=== New York City Bar Association ===
Dunne served as a leader in the New York City Bar Association, including as vice-chair and chair of the Association's Judiciary Committee, the group that reviews the qualifications of candidates for positions in the state and federal judiciary. In 2012, he was elected by the Association's 23,000 members to a two-year term as president, where he was responsible for all decisions, reports, and public communications on legal and policy issues addressed by the Association's 150 committees.

As President, Dunne created and oversaw the City Bar's Task Force on a Changing Profession, a blue-ribbon committee that proposed remedies to redress the effects of the 2008 financial crisis on new members of the legal profession.

He also created the Court Square Law Project, a program in conjunction with CUNY School of Law to provide ‘low-bono’ representation by new lawyers on a non-profit basis.

=== Service to the New York State courts ===
In 2015, Dunne was nominated by the New York State Commission on Judicial Nomination for appointment by the Governor to be the next Chief Judge of the State of New York.

Previously, Dunne served as Chair of the Special Commission on the Future of the New York State Courts, appointed by the then-Chief Judge, Judith Kaye, a panel that proposed constitutional reforms to improve the structure of the court system.

Dunne also served as the Chief Counsel to the New York State Commission on Drugs and the Courts, which issued a report that led to the creation of the nation's first rehabilitative drug courts.

He was also a member of the Chief Judge's Task Force on the New York State Constitution and the Commission on the Future of Indigent Defense Services.

=== Non-profit board service ===
Dunne has served as a board member of the Legal Aid Society, the New York City Bar Association, the Lawyers Committee of The Innocence Project, Volunteers of Legal Service, the New York Lawyers for the Public Interest, the Fund for Modern Courts, the Federal Bar Council, and the National Center for Law and Economic Justice.

== Awards ==
Dunne has been a recipient of the Federal Bar Council's Whitney North Seymour Award for Outstanding Public Service, the Brooklyn Bar Association's Volunteer Lawyers Project Dedication to Justice Award, the Fund for Modern Courts Award for Contributions to the Administration of Justice, the New York Lawyers for the Public Interest Law and Society Award and Best Lawyers’ Regulatory Enforcement Lawyer of the Year.

== Personal life ==
Dunne is married to Kate Manning, an author and journalist. They have three grown children. Dunne also plays the drums, and while at Davis Polk formed an all-lawyer rock band called The Objections. Its motto was "A band whose appeal can never be denied."
