= In re Grand Jury Subpoena (2019) =

- Court: United States Court of Appeals for the District of Columbia Circuit
- Full case name: In re Grand Jury Subpoena
- Argued: December 14, 2018
- Decided: January 18, 2019
- Citation: 912 F.3d 623, No. 18-3071

Case history
- Prior history: Sealed v. Sealed, No. 1:18-gj-00041 (D. D.C. 2018); In re Grand Jury Subpoena filed, No. 18-3068 (D.C. Cir. 2018); case dismissed for lack of jurisdiction (D.C. Cir. 2018); second appeal for In re Grand Jury Subpoena filed, No. 18-3071 (D.C. Cir. 2018)
- Subsequent history: Cert. denied, No. 18-948, 139 S. Ct. 1378 (S. Ct. 2019)

Holding
- The corporation owned by 'Country A' is not entitled to immunity in civil actions under the Foreign Sovereign Immunities Act, and must pay the contempt fine that was issued for defiance of a grand jury's subpoena.

Court membership
- Judges sitting: Circuit Judges David S. Tatel, Thomas B. Griffith, Senior Circuit Judge Stephen F. Williams

Case opinions
- Per curiam
- Concurrence: Williams (except Part III.B.; judgment)

Laws applied
- Foreign Sovereign Immunities Act

In re Grand Jury Subpoena, No. 18-3071, 912 F.3d 623 (2019), was a United States Court of Appeals for the District of Columbia Circuit case involving an appeal by company owned by a foreign government that was ordered by a federal judge to pay a $50,000 fine per day until it complies with a grand jury's subpoena. The subpoena was conducted by the grand jury empaneled by Robert Mueller in the Special Counsel investigation.

It was held that the unidentified corporation owned by an unidentified country is not entitled to immunity in civil actions under the Foreign Sovereign Immunities Act, and must pay the contempt fine that was issued for defiance of a grand jury's subpoena. The fine started accruing on January 15, 2019, and by March 25 could have totalled more than $3 million. Such fines accrue until the grand jury is no longer sitting.

== United States District Court for the District of Columbia ==
=== Contempt fine ===
Federal prosecutors suggested that the company owned by 'Country A' pay a contempt fine of $10,000 per day for refusing to cooperate with Robert Mueller's grand jury. United States District Court for the District of Columbia Chief Judge Beryl A. Howell imposed a larger contempt fine of $50,000 per day.

== D.C. Circuit ==
=== Dismissal of first appeal and filing of second appeal ===
On September 25, 2018, the corporation owned by 'Country A' filed an appeal, Case No. 18-3068, which was dismissed for lack of jurisdiction. A second appeal, Case No. 18-3071, was filed on October 10, 2018, and argued on December 14, 2018.

=== Panel selection and argument date ===
Circuit Judge Gregory G. Katsas recused himself from the case. A three-judge panel was selected that was made up of judges Stephen F. Williams, Thomas B. Griffith, and David S. Tatel. The case was argued under seal on December 14, 2018.

=== Opinion of the D.C. Circuit ===
On January 18, 2019, the D.C. Circuit, in a per curiam opinion, ruled that the corporation owned by 'Country A' is not entitled to immunity in civil actions under the Foreign Sovereign Immunities Act, and must pay the contempt fine of $50,000 per day that was issued by a federal judge for defying Robert Mueller's grand jury subpoena until compliance is met.

=== Concurrence ===
With the exception of Part III.B., Senior Circuit Judge Stephen F. Williams concurred with all parts of the majority opinion. Williams also concurred in the judgment in his opinion. Williams stated: "I believe clause 1 of 28 U.S.C. § 1605(a)(2) most compellingly establishes grounds for the government's contention that the Corporation is not immune to the subpoena."

== Identity of corporation and 'Country A' ==
The identity of the corporation and country have been subject to speculation. Russian-owned companies, like banks VTB Bank and VEB.RF, as well as oil company Rosneft have been mentioned as possibly being the company held in contempt. The corporation in question is said to be "wholly-owned by a foreign state", making it unlikely that VEB.RF is the company in question (VEB.RF is not a government-owned corporation). Saudi, Emirati, and Qatari-owned companies have also been discussed as possibly being the company owned by 'Country A'.

VTB Bank has widely been speculated as the mystery company owned by 'Country A' because of allegations of involvement in a Trump Tower Moscow project. An email from Felix Sater to Michael Cohen imply that Sater and Cohen were inclined to use VTB Bank as a source for funding Donald Trump's 2016 presidential campaign. The email also suggests the Trump Tower Moscow project was connected to the presidential campaign.

In October 2020 CNN reported that 'Country A' was Egypt.

== Supreme Court ==
On February 21, 2019, Solicitor General of the United States Noel Francisco urged the Supreme Court of the United States to deny the corporation's petition to hear the case.

On March 25, 2019, the Supreme Court declined to hear the case.

== See also ==
- In re Application of the Committee on the Judiciary
