= Department of Justice v. House Committee on the Judiciary =

United States Supreme Court Case

United States Department of Justice v. Committee on the Judiciary of the United States House of Representatives
- Court: United States Court of Appeals for the District of Columbia Circuit
- Full case name: In re Application of the Committee on the Judiciary, U.S. House of Representatives, for an Order Authorizing the Release of Certain Grand Jury Materials — Committee on the Judiciary, United States House of Representatives v. United States Department of Justice
- Argued: January 3, 2020
- Decided: March 10, 2020
- Citation: 19-1328; No. 19-5288

Case history
- Prior history: Application granted, In re Application of the Committee on the Judiciary, U.S. House of Representatives, for an Order Authorizing the Release of Certain Grand Jury Materials, No. 1:19-gj-00048-BAH (D. D.C. 2019)

Court membership
- Judges sitting: Judith W. Rogers, Thomas B. Griffith, Neomi Rao

Case opinions
- Majority: Rogers, joined by Griffith
- Concurrence: Griffith
- Dissent: Rao

Laws applied
- Rule 6(e) of the Federal Rules of Criminal Procedure

Department of Justice v. House Committee on the Judiciary (2020), No. 19-1328 (previously In re Application of the Committee on the Judiciary, No. 19-5288), was a court decision by the United States Court of Appeals for the District of Columbia Circuit. The case weighs whether a committee of the House of Representatives can assert the House's "sole power of impeachment" to subpoena materials gathered as part of a federal grand jury investigation which are ordinarily secret. Due to changes in the government by the time of the 2020 election, many of the aspects leading to the case have become unnecessary, and the Supreme Court ruled the case moot in orders released in July 2021.

== Background ==
Robert Mueller had been appointed as Special Counsel by United States Deputy Attorney General Rod Rosenstein to investigate possible Russian interference in the 2016 United States elections. The investigation ran from 2017 to 2019. During the investigation, Mueller assembled a grand jury empowered to subpoena documents, require witnesses to testify under oath, and issue indictments for targets of criminal charges if probable cause was found. Proceedings of the grand jury were kept in confidence.

Mueller delivered his final report, Report on the Investigation into Russian Interference in the 2016 Presidential Election, informally called the Mueller Report, to United States Attorney General William Barr on March 22, 2019. A heavily redacted version of the Mueller Report was released on April 18, 2019, which President Donald Trump stated later was due to executive privilege. The redacted report omitted much of the grand jury proceedings. While Mueller's Report concluded there was no evidence of Russian interference, and while there was no conclusive evidence of any crime committed by Trump, it "does not exonerate him".

The Mueller Report findings formed the basis for the Democratic-controlled House of Representatives to consider starting impeachment proceedings against President Trump. Mueller testified to several House committees on July 24, 2019, on details of the report, but still limited to what he could speak because of the President's claim of executive privilege.

On July 26, 2019, the House Judiciary Committee filed an application with the United States Court of Appeals for the District of Columbia Circuit to release certain grand jury materials associated with Mulluer's investigation. In October 2019, based on precedent established during the impeachment of Richard Nixon, the court granted the application. However, the Department of Justice immediately sought a stay for the subpoena.

== Case history ==
On December 13, 2019, the D.C. Circuit's panel of Judith W. Rogers, Thomas B. Griffith, and Neomi Rao ordered a briefing to address whether the House Judiciary Committee has Article III standing.

On December 16, House General Counselor Douglas Letter filed a brief outlining the importance of obtaining the grand jury materials.

On December 18, the D.C. Circuit ordered the parties involved to file supplemental briefings by December 23, addressing whether articles of impeachment render the case moot and whether expedited consideration is still necessary. The D.C. Circuit also suggested the House Judiciary Committee address whether it still seeks the materials from Robert Mueller's grand jury.

On December 23, the House Judiciary Committee and Justice Department filed supplemental briefings explaining their positions on standing and mootness.

The case was argued earlier before the United States Court of Appeals for the District of Columbia Circuit on January 3, 2020. The case was heard by a panel of three Circuit Judges: Judith W. Rogers, Thomas B. Griffith, and Neomi Rao.

On March 10, 2020, the court ruled 2–1 in favor of the Judiciary Committee, ordering the release of the grand jury materials; Judge Rogers wrote the opinion, and was joined by Judge Griffith, with Judge Rao dissenting.

== Supreme Court ==
Shortly before the deadline set by the Circuit Court for the production of the material, the Justice Department petitioned the Supreme Court to stay the ruling and review the case. The Supreme Court stayed the Circuit's mandate on May 8, 2020, and in June, the Justice Department filed a petition for a writ of certiorari which was opposed by the House Judiciary Committee. On July 2, 2020, the Supreme Court granted the Justice Department request for a writ of certiorari appealing the decision of the Circuit Court, and scheduled arguments for December 2, 2020.

In late November 2020, the House requested that the Supreme Court postpone oral arguments until after the 117th United States Congress convenes and Joe Biden is inaugurated as president in January 2021, at which point the reconstituted Committee can determine if it still wishes to pursue the matter. The Supreme Court agreed to the delay, removing the oral hearings from the schedule. Subsequently, the Supreme Court deemed the case moot in orders released on July 2, 2021, and ordered the Circuit court to vacate its decision, as per the Munsingwear vacatur.

== See also ==
- In re Grand Jury Subpoena (2019)
- Trump v. Deutsche Bank AG
- Trump v. Mazars USA, LLP
- Trump v. Vance
- Timeline of investigations into Trump and Russia (2019–2020)
