= Trump v. Mazars USA, LLP =

2020 Supreme Court decision on subpoenas

- Supreme Court of the United States

Argued May 12, 2020 Decided July 9, 2020
- Full case name: Donald J. Trump, et al. v. Mazars USA, LLP and Committee on Oversight and Reform of the U.S. House of Representatives
- Docket no.: 19-715
- Citations: 591 U.S. 848 (more) 140 S. Ct. 2019

Case history
- Prior: Preliminary injunction denied, Trump v. Comm. on Oversight and Reform, 380 F. Supp. 3d 76 (D.D.C. 2019); affirmed, 940 F.3d 710, No. 19-5142 (D.C. Cir. 2019); rehearing en banc denied, (D.C. Cir. Nov. 13, 2019); stay granted, Application No. 19A545 (S. Ct. 2019); cert. granted, consolidated with Second Circuit's Donald J. Trump, et al. v. Deutsche Bank AG, et al., No. 19-760 (S. Ct. 2019)

Holding
- The courts below did not take adequate account of the significant separation of powers concerns implicated by congressional subpoenas for the President's information.

Court membership
- Chief Justice John Roberts Associate Justices Clarence Thomas · Ruth Bader Ginsburg; Stephen Breyer · Samuel Alito; Sonia Sotomayor · Elena Kagan; Neil Gorsuch · Brett Kavanaugh

Case opinions
- Majority: Roberts, joined by Ginsburg, Breyer, Sotomayor, Kagan, Gorsuch, Kavanaugh
- Dissent: Thomas
- Dissent: Alito

Trump v. Mazars USA, LLP, 591 U.S. 848 (2020) was a landmark US Supreme Court case involving subpoenas issued by committees of the US House of Representatives to obtain the tax returns of President Donald Trump, who had litigated against his personal accounting firm to prevent this disclosure, although the committees had been cleared by the United States Court of Appeals for the District of Columbia Circuit. Mazars was consolidated with Trump v. Deutsche Bank AG (591 U.S. 848, docket 19-760).

In a 7–2 decision issued on July 9, 2020, the Supreme Court held that courts must take into account separation of powers in resolving disputes over congressional subpoenas seeking the personal information of the president, and set out four factors (described as non-exhaustive) to consider in evaluating the worthiness of such subpoena requests. The Supreme Court ruled that the lower court had not properly considered the separation of powers concerns; it vacated the lower court's decision and remanded the case back to the Circuit Court for review. The Supreme Court decided that the case raised questions of separation of powers, rather than executive privilege. It also noted that to request presidential documents like tax returns, Congress needs a legislative reason and may not conduct a criminal investigation, which is a power of the executive branch. Before the lower court reviewed the case, the subpoenas in question expired with the end of the 116th Congress on January 3, 2021, and on February 23, 2021, the House Committee in the 117th Congress reissued the subpoena to Mazars for the same documents it had previously sought.

Legal scholar Marty Lederman described Mazars as more important than Trump v. Vance, which was decided the same day. Lederman described Trump's argument that Congress entirely lacks "constitutional authority to investigate a sitting President's possible conflicts of interest and violations of law" as an "alarming" assertion that "would, if credited, be a radical departure from our constitutional history and tradition."

== Background ==
In April 2019, three committees of the US House of Representatives wanted to access the financial records of US President Donald Trump, his children, and affiliated businesses. They regarded attempts at subpoenaing Trump directly as likely to be futile and so issued four subpoenas to third parties. The House Committee on Financial Services subpoenaed Deutsche Bank and Capital One to seek records related to foreign transactions, business statements, debt schedules, statements of net worth, tax returns, and suspicious activity identified by the banks.

The Permanent Select Committee on Intelligence also subpoenaed Deutsche Bank for the same information. The House Committee on Oversight and Reform issued a subpoena to Trump's personal accounting firm, Mazars USA, LLP, demanding financial information pertaining to Trump and several affiliated businesses. Although each of the committees sought overlapping sets of financial documents, all of them supplied different justifications for the requests and explained that the information would help guide legislative reform in areas ranging from money laundering and terrorism to foreign involvement in US elections.

== Lower courts ==
=== Trump v. Mazars USA, LLP ===
Mazars was willing to comply with the subpoena, but Trump, in his personal capacity, sued Mazars to stop the firm from providing the information sought. The subpoena was stayed while the case wound its way through the courts. Trump lost both in the district court and on appeal, and Trump appealed to the Supreme Court.

In the United States Court of Appeals for the District of Columbia Circuit, on July 12, 2019, Trump said he was suing to prevent Mazars from complying with the subpoena and argued that the Committee's investigation into his financial records served no legitimate legislative purpose. On October 11, 2019, Judge David S. Tatel wrote the majority opinion, which was joined by Judge Patricia Millett, dismissing Trump's arguments. Judge Neomi Rao dissented, saying that the impeachment power is the only legitimate method for such congressional investigations.

On November 13, 2019, the DC Court of Appeals denied Trump's petition for an en banc rehearing 7-3; Gregory Katsas, Neomi Rao, and Karen Henderson dissenting.

On Trump's appeal, on November 18, 2019, the Supreme Court agreed to continue the stay for a few days and ordered the House Counsel to submit a rebuttal by November 21, which was done. House General Counsel Douglas Letter, in seeking a rapid subpoena ruling, wrote: "The President certainly has no right to dictate the timetable by which third parties provide information that could potentially be relevant to that inquiry."

=== Trump v. Deutsche Bank AG ===
The case has had multiple stages of movement through lower courts before being presented for arguments to the US Supreme Court:

- Trump v. Deutsche Bank AG, 943 F. 3d 627 - Court of Appeals, 2nd Circuit 2019
- Trump v. Deutsche Bank AG, 940 F. 3d 146 - Court of Appeals, 2nd Circuit 2019
- Trump v. Deutsche Bank AG, 140 S. Ct. 660 - Supreme Court 2019

The case was argued in the United States District Court for the Southern District of New York before Judge Edgardo Ramos on May 22, 2019, who ruled against Trump and ordered the banks to comply with the subpoenas. Trump appealed to the United States Court of Appeals for the Second Circuit. While the appeal was pending, Capital One submitted a letter to the court that it did not have any documents falling under the purview of the subpoena, but Deutsche Bank filed a letter stating otherwise. The court heard oral arguments on August 23, 2019.

The Deutsche Bank letter had two names redacted; an unredacted copy of the letter was also submitted under seal. In September, a motion was jointly filed by CNN, The New York Times, The Washington Post, Associated Press, and Politico to unseal the names. A week later, Reuters and Dow Jones & Company filed a motion to the same effect. In a 12-page unanimous opinion by Senior Judge Jon O. Newman, the judges denied the requests to unseal and stated that the mere filing of a sealed document is not sufficient grounds for it to enter public access. They also said that they would have been more compelled to unseal the names if Trump had been one of the redacted names, but they said that neither of them was.

On December 3, 2019, Judge Newman wrote the majority opinion, with Judge Peter W. Hall joining and Judge Debra Ann Livingston dissenting in part. Judge Newman's ruling mostly affirmed the district court's ruling ordering the banks to give documents to the US House of Representatives committees, but it partially remanded the case back to the District Court to allow Trump to argue against disclosing other specific personal information. In her partial dissent, Judge Livingston expressed concern that the subpoenas were too broad, calling them "deeply troubling" and would have fully remanded the case to the District Court to address that concern.

After the ruling, Trump appealed the case as well as Trump v. Mazars to the Supreme Court, which granted certiorari in both cases.

== Supreme Court ==
On November 25, 2019, the US Supreme Court granted a stay of the DC Circuit ruling extending the time for Trump to file a petition for a writ of certiorari to ask the Supreme Court to hear the case. Trump's legal team filed the petition on December 5, and on December 13, the Court granted certiorari and consolidated Trump v. Deutsche Bank AG with the Mazars case. The Court also granted certiorari for Trump v. Vance, a similar challenge related to subpoenas for Trump's tax records but from the Manhattan district attorney's office in relation to its ongoing investigation over payments made as part of the Stormy Daniels scandal.

The question facing the Court was whether the US House of Representatives has the authority to issue subpoenas addressed to third parties to obtain the private financial records of the president and his businesses.

Oral arguments were originally scheduled to take place on March 31, 2020, but two weeks before the arguments were to take place, the Supreme Court postponed arguments in response to the coronavirus pandemic and waited one month to announce the rescheduled date. In April 2020, the Supreme Court said that oral argument in Mazars and other cases would be heard by telephone. The oral arguments for the consolidated Trump v. Mazars and Trump v. Deutsche Bank AG, as well as Trump v. Vance, were heard on May 12. In arguing against the need for subpoenas for tax returns, Deputy Solicitor General Jeffrey Wall repeatedly cited that they presented "dangers of harassing and distracting and undermining the President."

=== Decision ===
The Supreme Court issued its ruling on July 9, 2020. In the 7–2 decision, the Court vacated the decision of the DC Circuit, which granted the subpoena, and that of the Second Circuit. The Supreme Court remanded the case to the lower courts for further assessment of separation of powers between the president and Congress.

Chief Justice John G. Roberts wrote the majority opinion, which was joined by all but Justices Clarence Thomas and Samuel Alito. In the decision, Roberts wrote that the Circuit Court had not taken full account of the separation of powers in its decision and stated that neither the congressional argument nor the presidential argument was wholly sound. Roberts wrote, "The standards proposed by the president and the solicitor general — if applied outside the context of privileged information — would risk seriously impeding Congress in carrying out its responsibilities.... The House's approach fails to take adequate account of the significant separation of powers issues raised by congressional subpoenas for the president's information. Far from accounting for separation of powers concerns, the House's approach aggravates them by leaving essentially no limits on the congressional power to subpoena the president's personal records. Any personal paper possessed by a president could potentially 'relate to' a conceivable subject of legislation, for Congress has broad legislative powers that touch a vast number of subjects." He also noted that other conflicts between the legislative and the executive branches on subpoenas had been resolved by both political branches of the federal government by negotiation and compromise without involvement by the Supreme Court. Roberts recognized that the executive privilege is designed to safeguard presidential decision-making, but he noted that the president does not have blanket immunity from records requests since the protection caused by executive privilege "should not be transplanted root and branch to cases involving nonprivileged, private information, which by definition does not implicate sensitive Executive Branch deliberations."

Roberts stated that congressional subpoenas directed at the president and his personal papers demand careful scrutiny "for they stem from a rival political branch that has an ongoing relationship with the president and incentives to use subpoenas for institutional advantage." In sending the case back to a lower court, Roberts gave the court four considerations to determine whether the subpoenas were appropriate:

- Whether the legislative request warrants the involvement of the president and if other sources can reasonably provide Congress the same information
- Whether the subpoena is no broader than is reasonably necessary to support the legislative objective.
- Whether the nature of evidence that is requested by the subpoena would advance a valid legislative purpose.
- Whether the subpoena burdens the president and may be a result from partisan politics.

Justices Clarence Thomas and Samuel Alito both wrote dissenting opinions asserting that the subpoenas were invalid. Thomas claimed that since the documents sought do not pertain to the presidency, the subpoenas must have been made as part of an impeachment investigation. Alito agreed that the case should be remanded but argued that the House committees had not shown adequate justification and that the majority opinion's criteria were an insufficient remedy for the lower courts.

== Impact and aftermath ==
The Supreme Court's decision in Mazars was generally considered favorable to Trump from a political standpoint even though the rulings in both Mazars and the associated Vance case could allow the tax returns to be subpoenaed. The ruling acknowledged that Congress has the power to subpoena the president and his papers as part of the legislative process, but it set limits to these requests. While the challenges to the House subpoenas were returned to the Circuit Court for review based on the four considerations set out by Roberts, they were not resolved before the November 2020 presidential election. Trump's political opponents had hoped to use the tax returns as part of their strategy in the campaign.

=== Reissued subpoena ===
Before the District Court reviewed the case, the subpoenas in question expired with the end of the 116th Congress on January 3, 2021. After Trump left office, on February 23, 2021, the House Oversight and Reform Committee in the 117th Congress reissued the subpoena to Mazars for the same documents it had previously sought. The reissued subpoena followed the rejection by the Supreme Court on February 22 of Trump's last-ditch bid to keep his records away from Manhattan District Attorney Vance in Trump v. Vance and their prompt production by Mazars. The joint status report of the parties filed on March 2 suggested a schedule for additional arguments and briefings stretching into June. Carolyn Maloney, Chairwoman of the House Oversight Committee, said that the new subpoena will again be "for financial records related to the committee's investigations into presidential conflicts of interest, presidential contracts with the federal government and self-dealing, and presidential emoluments."

=== District Court review ===
The case was reviewed by the District Court on August 11, 2021. Applying the criteria now set out in Mazars' case, the court held that the Committee's asserted legislative purpose of bolstering financial disclosure laws for Presidents and presidential candidates does not warrant disclosure of President Trump's personal and corporate financial records. However, the Committee's other stated justifications for demanding President Trump's personal and corporate financial records—to legislate on the topic of federal lease agreements and conduct oversight of the General Services Administration's lease with the Trump Old Post Office, LLC (which had been leased for 60 years to a Trump company in 2013), and to legislate pursuant to Congress's authority under the Foreign Emoluments Clause—do not raise the same separation of powers concerns. The court ruled that records relating to those justifications must be disclosed.

== See also ==
- Department of Justice v. House Committee on the Judiciary
- New York County District Attorney Cyrus Vance Jr., Trump v. Vance
- Tax March
- Russian interference in the 2016 United States elections
