= New York investigations of the Trump Organization =

American criminal and civil investigation

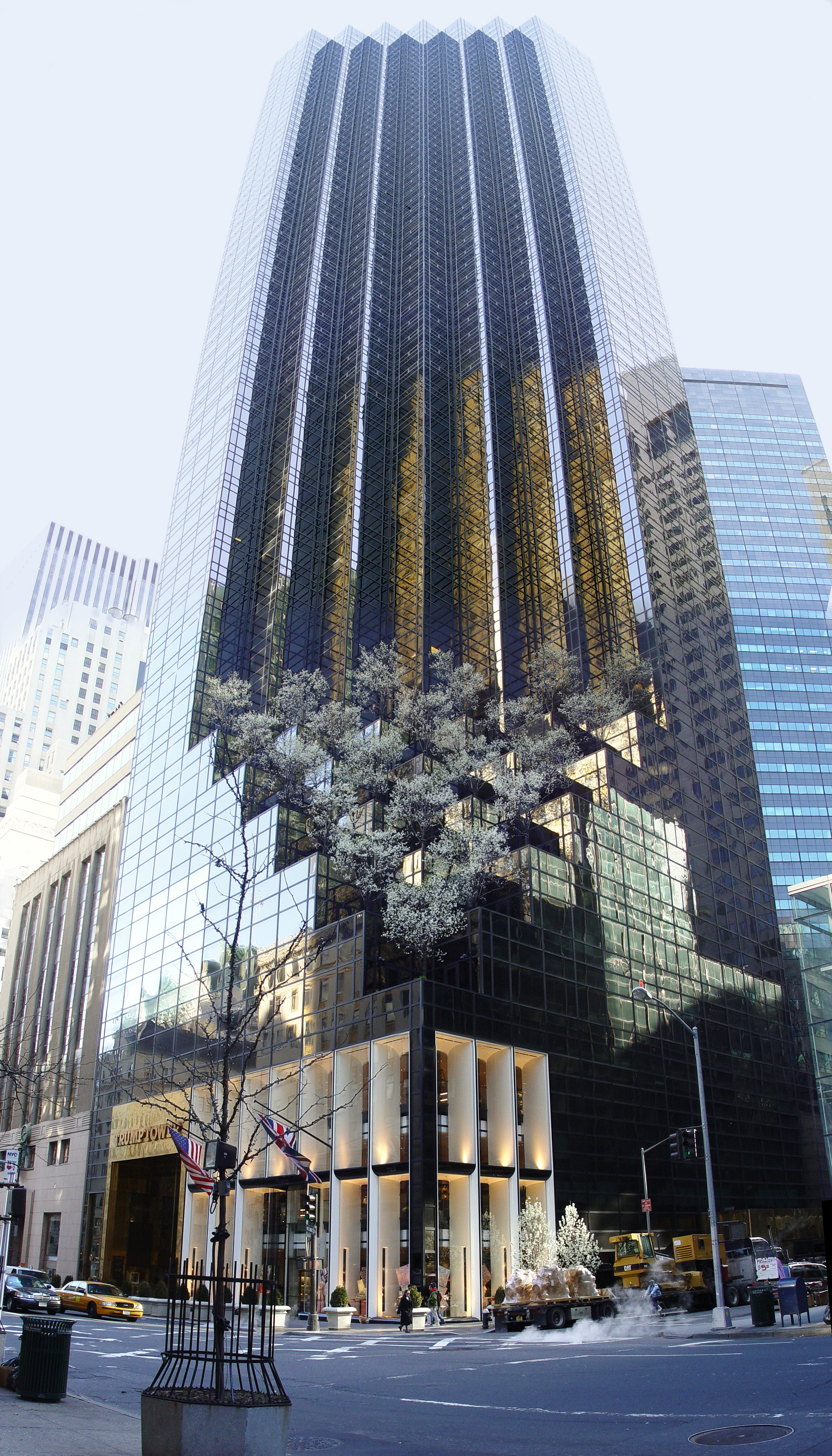
Trump Tower (Manhattan, New York), headquarters of the Trump Organization and a subject of scrutiny for financial misreporting in the civil case

Two related investigations by New York State and City officials were opened by 2020 to determine whether the Trump Organization has committed financial fraud. One of these is a criminal case being conducted by the Manhattan district attorney (DA) and the other is a civil case being conducted by the New York State Attorney General (AG). The DA's case has led to two of the organization's subsidiary companies being found guilty of 17 charges including tax fraud and the indictment of Donald Trump, while the AG has succeeded in imposing an independent monitor to prevent future fraud by the organization.

By mid-2021, New York AG Letitia James had joined the DA's criminal probe, with the latter convening a grand jury. Prosecutors filed 10 charges against the organization, alleging that it had conducted a 15-year "scheme to defraud" the government, and 15 felony counts against longtime chief financial officer Allen Weisselberg—who invoked his Fifth Amendment right against self-incrimination more than 500 times in his testimony. In August 2022, Weisselberg pleaded guilty and agreed to testify against the organization in exchange for a reduced sentence. In December, the organization was convicted of all 17 criminal charges it faced. Evidence including the testimonies of Weisselberg and others indicate that he and other executives—as well as the two subsidiaries—participated in fraudulent schemes, including recording some employee bonuses as pay for contract work. A number of illegal practices were ceased around the time of Trump's election as U.S. president.

In 2020, Eric Trump pleaded the Fifth over 500 times in his testimony for the AG. In November 2021, The Washington Post reported that between 2011 and 2015 the organization presented several properties as being worth far more to potential lenders than to tax officials. Donald Trump reportedly pleaded the Fifth more than 400 times in his August 2022 deposition. In September, James filed a civil lawsuit against Trump, his three oldest children, and the organization for alleged fraud. Additionally, she referred the case to federal criminal prosecutors and the Internal Revenue Service. In November, the New York judge overseeing the lawsuit appointed retired judge Barbara S. Jones to monitor the organization, with a trial being held from late 2023 to early 2024.

== Background ==
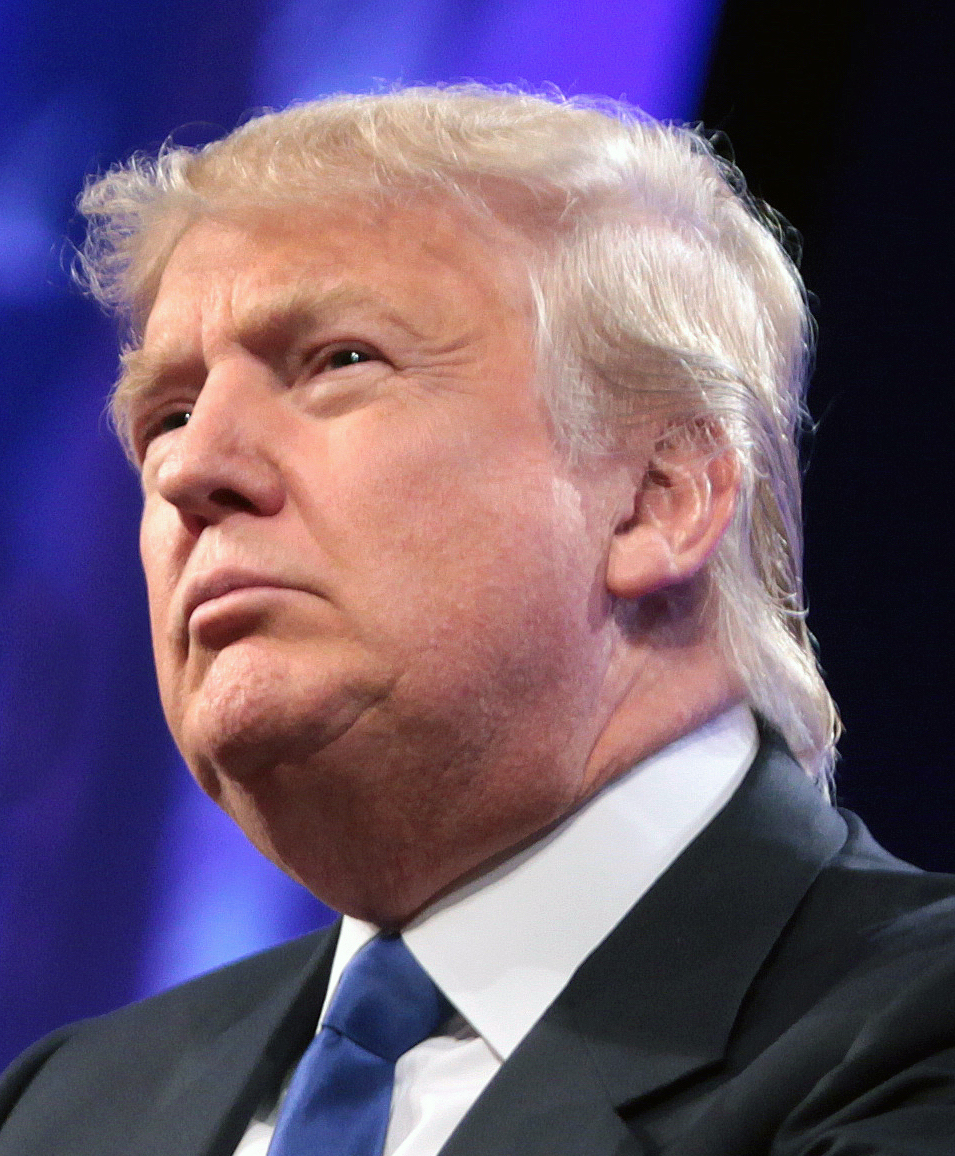
Donald Trump in 2015

The financial statements of the Trump Organization's holdings are private, and there exist a wide range of estimates of the organization's true value. Donald Trump has been accused on several occasions of deliberately inflating the valuation of Trump Organization properties through the aggressive lobbying of the media, in particular the authors of the annual Forbes 400 list, in order to bolster his perceived net worth among the public over several decades. He has released little definitive financial documentation to the public to confirm his valuation claims. It is difficult to determine a net value for the Trump Organization's real-estate holdings independently since each individual property may be encumbered by debt. In October 2015, Forbes published an article detailing its decades-long struggle to estimate the true net worth of Trump and the organization. In 2018, a former Forbes journalist who had worked on the Forbes list claimed in an op-ed to The Washington Post that Trump had lied about his wealth to Forbes to get on the list repeatedly and suggested that Forbes's previous low-end estimates of Trump's net worth were still well above his true net worth.

On a Schedule C form filed in 1984 for a purported consulting business, Trump reported no income but over $600,000 in unknown expenses. After New York State and City auditors rejected the unexplained expenses, Trump requested a tax trial. In separate 1992 trials, state and city judges ruled against Trump. In the city case Trump's only witness was the lawyer and accountant who prepared his returns for over 20 years, who testified that although it had his signature he did not prepare the 1984 return he was presented a photocopy of (the original copy being unavailable); Trump asserted that he had been subjected to double taxation, in response to which the judge wrote that "The problem at issue is [instead one] of no taxation." In June 2016 (during Trump's presidential campaign), investigative journalist David Cay Johnston argued that the proceedings demonstrated evidence of intentional tax fraud and that Trump should release his tax returns to disclose whether he had repeated such behavior.

In a defamation case against TrumpNation author Timothy L. O'Brien, Donald Trump testified in 2007 that "I think everybody" exaggerates their property values and that he did not do so "beyond reason". He said he would give his opinion to chief financial officer (CFO) Allen Weisselberg, who "predominately" determined final values, which Trump called "conservative". Regarding one case in which a property increased from $80 million in 2005 to $150 million in 2006, Trump stated, "The property was valued very low, in my opinion, then and it became very—it just has gone up." He was unable to provide a reason for this other than his opinion. Between 2011 and 2015, the Trump Organization presented several properties as being worth millions of dollars—in one case over $500 million—more to potential lenders than to tax officials; this was reported by The Washington Post in November 2021. In January 2017, ahead of Trump's inauguration as U.S. president, his attorney Sheri Dillon announced that the organization's businesses would be transferred to a trust controlled by Trump's sons Donald Jr. and Eric Trump, as well as Weisselberg.

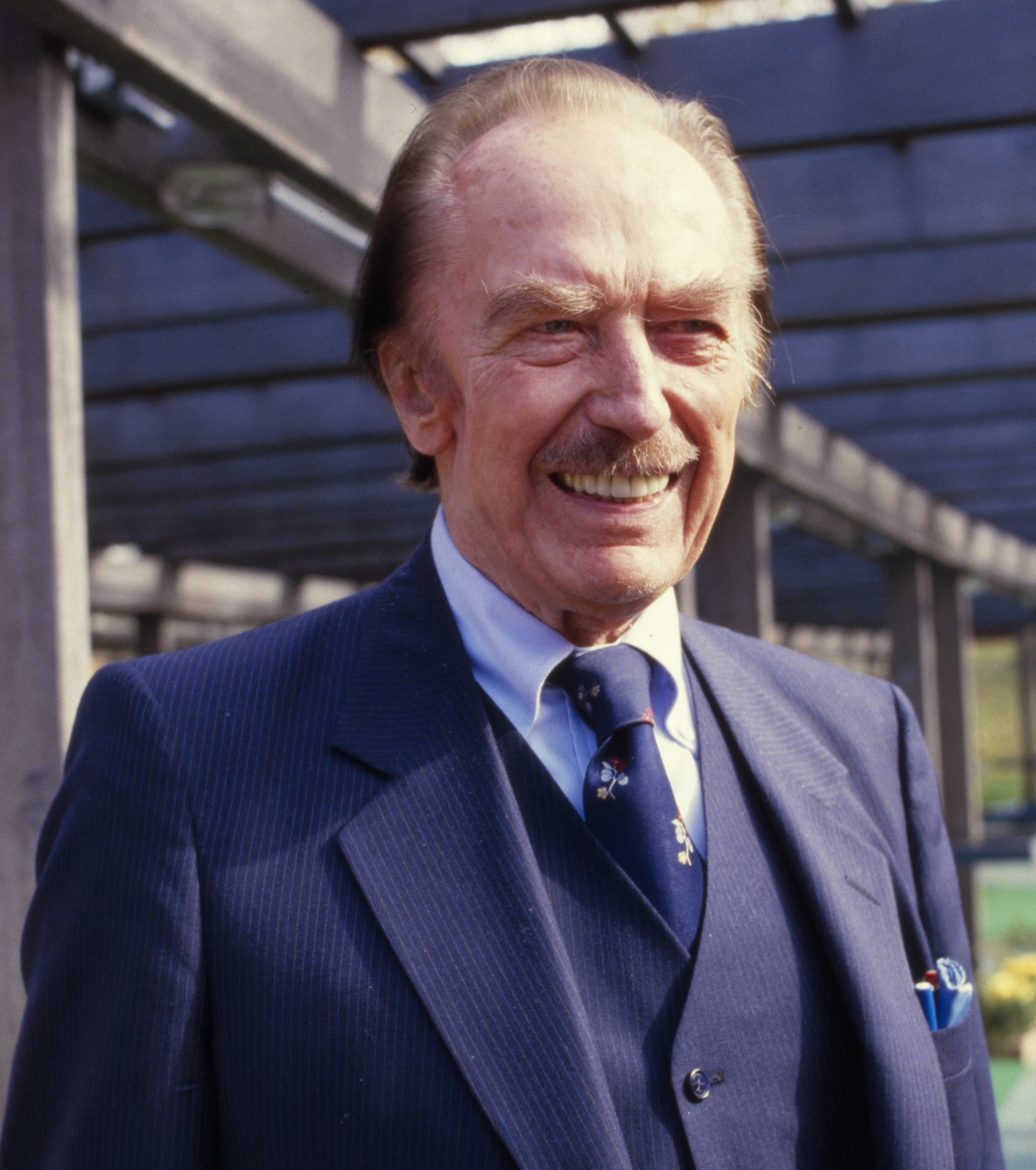
Donald Trump's father, Fred, c. 1986

In October 2018, The New York Times published a lengthy exposé concerning Donald Trump's inheritance from his parents, Fred and Mary Anne MacLeod Trump. It includes detailed analyses of Trump family financial records. (Note: This drew from interviews with former Trump advisers and employees and over 100,000 pages of tax returns and financial records from Trump businesses. Donald's niece, Mary L. Trump, revealed in her 2020 memoir that she provided the Times with 19 boxes of these financial records.) The article describes an alleged tax fraud scheme conducted by Trump and his siblings related to their joint inheritance of their parents's real estate holdings, effectively evading over $500 million in gift and estate taxes. The alleged schemes involve money from the companies being siphoned to the children throughout their lives and understating the value of transferred properties. (Note: A lawyer for Donald Trump denied that fraud or tax evasion had been committed, stating that "President Trump had virtually no involvement whatsoever with these matters. The affairs were handled by other Trump family members who were not experts themselves and therefore relied entirely upon [licensed attorneys, Certified Public Accountants and real estate appraisers]". Incidentally, Donald Trump has claimed to be more knowledgeable about taxes "than the greatest C.P.A." and stated that he used such knowledge to his personal gain.) The New York State Department of Taxation and Finance announced on the day of the exposé's publication that it would review the allegations. In mid-2021, Mary L. Trump (a primary source for the exposé) elaborated on how the organization used a shell corporation to siphon money, devaluing Fred Trump's "core business" to $30 million at the time of his death.

In August 2018, Manhattan District Attorney (DA) Cyrus Vance Jr. was reportedly considering a criminal investigation of the organization and two of its senior executives for their reimbursement of then-Trump personal attorney Michael Cohen for his hush-money payment to Stormy Daniels; the organization recorded the reimbursement as a legal expense although Cohen did no legal work in the matter. In August 2019, Vance subpoenaed the organization's accountants, Mazars, for Trump's tax returns. In July 2020, the U.S. Supreme Court ruled that Trump's tax records could be released to prosecutors, producing millions of pages of documents, reportedly including Trump's returns from January 2011 to August 2019. In November 2022, the DA's office (then under Alvin Bragg) was reportedly again scrutinizing the hush-money affair, leading to Trump's indictment. Following a Supreme Court ruling, the U.S. Treasury Department released Trump's returns from 2015 to 2020 to the House Ways and Means Committee, and following the committee's vote, the returns were released to the public before the end of the year.

In February 2019, prompted by U.S. House Representative Alexandria Ocasio-Cortez (D-NY) asking whether Trump had ever presented inflated assets to an insurance company, Cohen testified to Congress that Trump "inflated [the organization's] total assets when it served his purposes, such as trying to be listed amongst the wealthiest people in Forbes, and deflated his assets to reduce his real estate taxes." Following Cohen's testimony, in March, the New York State Department of Financial Services issued a subpoena to Aon, the organization's longtime insurance broker. The same month, the office of New York Attorney General (AG) Letitia James began investigating the organization, having stated that she intended to do so during her 2018 campaign. By September 2019, the organization was under federal investigation by the Southern District of New York regarding inflated insurance claims allegations. By December, James's office had subpoenaed the organization for some records which it subsequently failed to provide for at least 21 months.

== Criminal investigation ==
By 2020, the Manhattan district attorney (DA) had opened a criminal investigation to determine whether The Trump Organization, including any individuals or business entities associated with it, had committed financial fraud. The investigation led to three grand juries being convened, two of which approved indictments.

The first indictment named longtime Chief Financial Officer Allen Weisselberg and two Trump Organization business entities. Evidence against the organization indicated that Weisselberg and other executives—as well as the two subsidiaries—participated in fraudulent schemes, including recording some employee bonuses as pay for contract work. Prosecutors filed 10 charges against the organization, alleging that it had conducted a 15-year "scheme to defraud" the government, and 15 felony counts against Weisselberg, who agreed to a plea deal in August 2022, during Manhattan DA Alvin Bragg's tenure. Both business entities were convicted of 17 charges including tax fraud in a trial in late 2022.

The second indictment charged Donald Trump with 34 felony counts of falsifying business records in tandem with an alleged catch and kill operation to suppress negative press during his 2016 campaign, largely revolving around the hush-money payment to pornographic actress Stormy Daniels. (Note: In a post-arraignment news conference, Bragg cited potential violations including the alleged (1) unlawful promotion of a candidacy, (2) payment to Daniels exceeding the federal campaign contribution allowance, (3) illegal catch and kill operation coordinated with American Media, Inc., which may have falsely characterized related payments, and (4) underlying tax fraud when Weisselberg apparently recorded the reimbursement to Cohen as taxable income.) On April 4, 2023, he pleaded not guilty. The trial began in April 2024, and in May a jury convicted Trump on all 34 counts. The judge consented to two defense sentencing delay requests, resulting in it being scheduled for after the 2024 election.

Some conservative pundits denounced the investigation, with the Republican National Committee paying some of Trump's legal fees, while Democrats generally endorsed it. After Trump's indictment, Republican U.S. House Judiciary Committee Chair Jim Jordan organized a hearing against Bragg, leading the DA to sue him for alleged interference.

=== Trump Corporation case ===
People v. Trump Corporation is a state criminal case in New York. In July 2021, an indictment was issued against three defendants: the Trump Corporation and the Trump Payroll Corporation, both constituent entities of the Trump Organization; and Allen Weisselberg, chief financial officer of the Trump Organization. All defendants were charged with scheming to defraud, conspiracy, tax fraud, and falsifying business records, and Weisselberg was additionally charged with grand larceny and offering a false instrument for filing.

In August 2022, Weisselberg pleaded guilty to 15 felonies and agreed to testify against the organization in a plea deal. On December 6, the organization was convicted of all 17 criminal charges it faced, and the organization was fined the maximum allowable $1.6 million.

=== Asset valuation investigation ===
The Manhattan DA convened a second grand jury the last week of October 2021; it began to hear evidence on November 4, reportedly to consider charges related to the company's valuation of assets. By November 22, prosecutors were scrutinizing several of the organization's properties for which, between 2011 and 2015, far higher values were presented to potential lenders than were reported to tax officials. In the most extreme case, in 2012, the 40 Wall Street building was cited as being worth $527 million to the former, but only $16.7 million to the latter. Michael Cohen subsequently stated that prosecutors could "indict Donald Trump tomorrow if they really wanted, and be successful".

By mid-December, an accountant for Trump had testified before the grand jury. Prosecutors were reportedly examining whether the organization provided its outside accountants, Mazars USA, with cherry-picked information with which to prepare favorable financial statements to present to prospective lenders. Mazars provided disclaimers with its financial statements for the organization, indicating that the firm had not audited, reviewed, or given any assurances about them, and noting that "Donald J. Trump is responsible for the preparation and fair presentation of the financial statement in accordance with accounting principles generally accepted in the United States of America." On February 9, 2022, Mazars informed the organization that it would no longer support the financial statements it had prepared for the organization from mid-2010 to mid-2020.

Also on February 22, 2022, Bragg told two of his lead prosecutors, Mark F. Pomerantz and Carey R. Dunne, that he was not ready to indict Trump based on the difficulty of proving that he had criminal intent. The two prosecutors resigned the following day, with Pomerantz writing in his resignation letter that there is "evidence sufficient to establish Mr. Trump's guilt beyond a reasonable doubt" regarding "numerous felony violations" and that Vance had directed his deputies to seek indictments "as soon as reasonably possible". The New York Times reported that the resignations followed a monthlong pause of evidence being presented to the jury, which was expected to remain seated until the end of April, as well as discussions about charging Trump with conspiracy and falsifying financial records (instead of a fraud charge). The most recent evidence heard was reportedly from Trump's Mazars accountant and an expert in real-estate property valuation from FTI Consulting.

On February 24, Bragg recruited his investigations chief to the lead prosecutor role. The DA's office was expected to continue debating the strength of the case. On April 7, Bragg issued a statement insisting that the investigation was still ongoing, with new evidence being reviewed, and pledged to make the findings public whether or not indictments were made. Witnesses were still being interviewed as of late April, shortly before the jury expired.

According to Pomerantz's 2023 book on the investigation, racketeering charges were considered for Trump, with Pomerantz comparing the real-estate mogul to mob boss John Gotti. Trump's lawyer Joe Tacopina rejected the comparison. (Note: Days later, a former state and federal prosecutor with experience prosecuting mafia members stated that some of Trump's legal tactics, especially those related to his allegedly coaching Cohen about how to testify, were "completely out of the mob playbook".) Pomerantz also stated that "To rebut the claim that Trump believed his own 'hype'... we would have to show, and stress, that Donald Trump was not legally insane." According to Pomerantz, prosecutors were weeks away from charging Trump in late 2020 for the discrepancy in 40 Wall Street's valuation (with the "absurd" value reported to tax officials under penalty of perjury being less than the building's total annual rent), but the New York City Law Department downplayed this as a standard negotiating tactic. Pomerantz compared Bragg's decision not to follow his predecessor's lead in prosecuting Trump to a plane crash. Bragg defended himself by stating that "Mr. Pomerantz's plane wasn't ready for takeoff." Pomerantz further argued that if anyone else besides Trump or another former president had carried out the same conduct, charges would have immediately been brought against them.

=== Hush money business records case ===
The People of the State of New York v. Donald J. Trump was a criminal case against Trump. On March 30, 2023, he was indicted by a Manhattan grand jury for his role in a scandal relating to hush money payments made to the pornographic film actress Stormy Daniels before the 2016 U.S. presidential election, making him the first U.S. president to be indicted. (Note: Congress dropped its impeachment proceedings against Richard Nixon after he resigned in August 1974 and he was pardoned the next month for any crimes he may have committed while in office.)

On April 4, 2023, he pleaded not guilty. The trial began in April 2024, and in May a jury convicted Trump on all 34 counts. Sentencing was postponed until November 26, 2024. Trump faced a maximum sentence of 136 years in prison. (Note: In New York, falsifying business records is a misdemeanor, but can become a felony if done to further another crime.) On January 10, 2025, Merchan issued an unconditional discharge.

Throughout the investigation that led to the indictment, Trump accused district attorney Alvin Bragg—the case's prosecutor—of having political motivations. Months before he was indicted, Trump declared that he would run in the 2024 presidential election. The U.S. Constitution does not disqualify a convicted felon from being president.

== Civil investigation ==
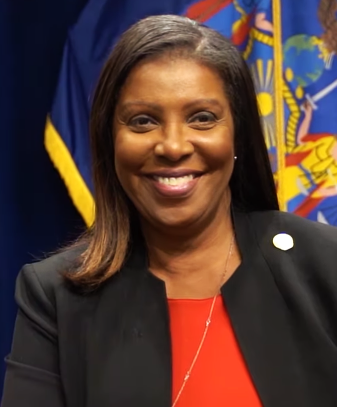
New York Attorney General Letitia James

New York v. Trump is a civil investigation and lawsuit by the office of the New York Attorney General (AG) alleging that The Trump Organization and several individuals (including operative members of the Trump family) engaged in financial fraud by presenting vastly disparate property values to potential lenders and tax officials, in violation of New York Executive Law § 63(12). A trial took place from October 2023 to January 2024. As a result of the trial, the presiding judge Arthur Engoron ordered the defendants to disgorge a total of US$364 million of ill-gotten gains, among other penalties.

AG Letitia James began investigating the organization in early 2019, with public litigation beginning in August 2020 to support her subpoenas in the inquiry. In February 2022, Engoron ruled in favor of James's subpoenas, and that April, Donald Trump was found in contempt of court for not complying with them and Trump was fined $110,000.

In September 2022, the AG sued Donald, his three oldest children (Donald Jr., Ivanka, and Eric), former chief financial officer Allen Weisselberg, former controller Jeffrey McConney, and ten related companies. That November, Engoron appointed retired judge Barbara S. Jones to monitor the organization regarding potential future fraud. In 2023, Ivanka was released as a defendant due to an expired statute of limitations.

In September 2023, Engoron issued a summary judgment that Trump and his company had committed fraud for years. The judge ordered the termination of the defendants' state business licenses and the dissolution of pertinent limited liability companies (pending appeal). The trial covered six additional claims by the AG and considered further penalties. In October, a gag order was placed on Trump, forbidding him from publicly disparaging court staff; the judge fined Trump $5,000 and $10,000 for two violations of the order that same month. The defense unsuccessfully sought to dismiss the case, as well as related subpoenas and rulings.

In February 2024, Engoron concluded that the "defendants failed to accept responsibility or to impose internal controls to prevent future recurrences" of having "submitted blatantly false financial data" to "borrow more and at lower rates". Engoron assessed Donald Trump and his companies $354 million of disgorgement of ill-gotten gains (not including interest), while Eric and Donald Jr. were assessed $4 million each, and Weisselberg $1 million. These four and McConney were also banned from leading New York organizations from two to three years; Weisselberg and McConney were also permanently banned from having any financial control in such organizations. The judgment was appealed.

In March 2024, the New York Appellate Division, First Department lowered the defendants' required bond from $464 million to $175 million, which would be posted in early April, while staying the bans ordered by Engoron. The bond would later be approved on April 22, 2024. This ruling which approved the bond also resulted in Trump avoiding legal challenges.

== Reactions ==
Some commenters pointed out the irony of Donald Trump being faced with pleading the Fifth Amendment, which he has expressed disdain for doing, saying it implies a party's guilt. (Note: Trump previously pleaded the Fifth to avoid answering 97 questions in a deposition related to his 1990 divorce from Ivana Trump, and after invoking it in his testimony in the New York civil case, explained, "When ... your company, and all the people in your orbit have become the targets of [a] Witch Hunt supported by lawyers, prosecutors and the Fake News Media, you have no choice" but to plead the Fifth.) In December 2020, Fox News host Sean Hannity stated that "The president out the door needs to pardon his whole family and himself because they want this witch hunt to go on in perpetuity, they're so full of rage and insanity against the president." Some news outlets speculated that the president might preemptively pardon his children in connection with the criminal case, although the power only applies to federal crimes. At a political rally on July 3, 2021, Trump appeared to acknowledge the truth of the New York prosecutors' criminal charges against his company, then described filing taxes as generally confusing; journalist Andrew Feinberg referred to these statements as an "admission". A Slate writer compared Trump's alleged confusion about taxes to his prior self-proclaimed expertise, for example saying he was "smart" for not paying income tax during certain years while debating Hillary Clinton in 2016.

In mid-2021, the Republican National Committee (RNC) agreed to financially support Trump's legal defense in both inquiries. In October, it paid $121,670 to a law firm employed by Trump. The next month, a Republican (GOP) spokesperson called Trump "a leader of our party [whose] record of achievement is critical to the GOP" and referred to the investigations as a "never ending witch hunt" by Democrats. In December, it was reported that the RNC had agreed to pay up to $1.6 million of Trump's legal expenses for both cases. Some sources have pointed out that the matters being investigated took place prior to Trump becoming president. Speaking to Hannity on Fox News in February 2022, Eric Trump argued that the investigations were only being conducted because his father was "clearly the frontrunner for 2024". In early July 2022, the Washington Examiner reported that Trump was considering announcing his presidential run soon, apparently in order to increase his sway against the "scathing hearings" in the House Select Committee on the January 6 Attack. The RNC indicated that it would cut off legal funding for Trump as required if he officially announced his candidacy. (Note: Trump officially announced his candidacy on November 15, 2022.) Later in July, Rolling Stone reported that Trump hoped to use the executive office to protect him from federal prosecution, but "The law is less clear on whether a president can face prosecution from states while in office."

In January 2022, NBC News cited a criminal defense lawyer it employs as a legal analyst, who observed: "Generally, lying to a bank to obtain a loan can be a crime." A New York defense lawyer who worked for Cyrus Vance Jr. called a potential trial against Trump a "logistical nightmare" and "unprecedented in a courthouse that has seen many, many high-profile cases over the decades." (Note: These include Harvey Weinstein's sexual abuse case, which drew protesters.) The director of public information for New York's state courts points out that 4,000 court officers (with training similar to police) are employed to uphold public safety if necessary. In the wake of the two lead prosecutors resigning from the criminal case, media outlets and a lawyer for Trump opined that the investigation seemed to be unwinding; some noted that while Vance had confidence in the criminal case, his successor, Bragg, exhibited less interest. On April 25, Rise and Resist protesters gathered outside New York County Courthouse with a large sign reading "Indict Trump". According to a legal expert cited by The Guardian in May, the nature of grand juries often favors the prosecution, with only a majority vote needed to secure an indictment, as well as "legally sufficient evidence of a crime and ... reasonable cause to believe that the accused person committed that crime". On a July podcast with John C. Coffee, Pomerantz argued that Trump would have been charged if not for his "financial and political influence" and that such an outcome would "vindicate the rule of law". In early 2023, Cohen opined that Bragg may not have followed in his predecessor's footsteps due to his need to catch up in his new role first.

In early September, law professor Jessica Levinson stated on NPR that Trump's potential campaign for the 2024 presidential election "will have no legal impact on any of the criminal investigations against him [but] will have a huge political impact" regarding the rule of law and future elections. On September 22, The Wall Street Journal editorial board—having written earlier in the year that the investigation "looks like more evidence of the decline of America's rule of law"—stated that "Trump has made a business and political career of getting away with whatever he can, and it's easy to imagine he crossed a line." Later in the month, a former assistant DA and asset forfeiture chief in the Manhattan DA's office argued, "This is going to be a very difficult case for the defendants to win. One of the best defenses to this matter is to delay." New York Times columnist Gail Collins opined that Trump supporters would not be alienated by the former president's apparent fraud due to his already being well known for distorting the truth.

A Curbed article from October about the state of Trump's real-estate empire in New York City concludes that "In effect, his footprint in New York has already been shrinking for years, and James's lawsuit, while it may never come to fruition, has already laid that bare." Michael Cohen predicted that the lawsuit would "financially destroy" Trump and lead to his being perp walked.

On November 4, 2022, citing McConney's stated involvement in providing fringe benefits, Andrea Bernstein stated on NPR that "under New York law, the company is criminally liable if high managerial agents commit crimes." On November 14, CBS News cited a former employee of the organization's accounting department as saying that he knew about Allen and Barry Weisselberg's fringe benefits and that the former's propinquity with Trump was known within the department. On November 15, New York Daily News asserted that the removal of Weisselberg's name from a copy of a page from Trump's ledger (provided to a New York City grand jury in 2021) might constitute obstruction of justice. After the defense in the criminal trial rested its case, Reuters argued that the testimony of its witness Donald Bender "appeared to backfire ... and bolster the prosecution's case".

In mid-November 2022, CBS News reported that three law firms involved in the criminal trial had received more than $500,000 from the Save America PAC and the RNC over the previous two months. Some political experts have argued that the fallout of the criminal conviction would do little to damage Trump's political career due to his not being personally convicted. (Note: A political science practitioner at the University of New Haven states, "there's people that are so strongly into that sort of MAGA movement that nothing [Trump] does is going to turn them away.") Contrarily, some with inside knowledge of the investigations argue that Trump was personally implicated via the guilty verdict against his company, despite denials of wrongdoing made on his behalf. An indictment or even a conviction would not constitutionally bar Trump from the presidential election.

In February 2023, The New York Times reported that in 2021 and 2022, the Save America PAC spent $16 million in legal-related payments, some which were directed to firms representing Trump's company.

On November 16, a New York appeals court ruled that Cohen could sue the organization to reimburse legal fees (in the range of millions of dollars) for Trump-related litigation including the investigations by the DA and AG. After the organization's conviction in the criminal case, Cohen stated that Trump "should be very uncomfortable" regarding his own testimony to the DA's office. Some speculated that the conviction would be highly damaging to the company's reputation, with a law professor at Pace University calling it a "death knell". Bloomberg opined that the felony charges would be eclipsed by their impact. New York City Councilmember Shekar Krishnan called for the city's parks department to terminate a golf-course contract with an organization affiliate (previously unsuccessfully attempted by former mayor Bill de Blasio in response to the January 6 U.S. Capitol attack), but a spokesperson for Mayor Eric Adams pointed out that the affiliate itself was not convicted, so "ending the contract we inherited would likely still require the city to pay up to tens of millions of dollars to the Trump affiliate". (Note: In early 2023, Bally's Corporation reportedly pledged to remove Trump's name from the golf course if it wins a bid for a new casino license.) On January 1, 2023, an MSNBC opinion columnist cited the investigations amongst several others in arguing that Trump was likely to be charged that year. Writing for New York Daily News, investigative journalist David Cay Johnston opined that Trump could be convicted on "easy-to-prove state income tax fraud charges" based on documents available to the DA's office, including Trump's publicly released tax returns which Johnston said were "rich with what the IRS calls 'badges of fraud,'" such as "hundreds of thousands of dollars in unexplained expenses" on numerous Schedule C forms showing zero income and "revenues and expenses that [suspiciously match] to the dollar". Johnston pointed out that the former method was used by Trump in 1984 and (according to Johnston) found by New York judges to constitute civil tax fraud, which he argued that Trump undoubtedly knew before repeating 26 times, thus providing evidence of mens rea (knowledge of one's criminal intent). (Note: On a Schedule C form filed in 1984 for a purported consulting business, Trump reported no income but over $600,000 in unknown expenses. After New York State and City auditors rejected the unexplained expenses, Trump requested a tax trial. In separate 1992 trials, state and city judges ruled against Trump. In the city case Trump's only witness was the lawyer and accountant who prepared his returns for over 20 years, who testified that although it had his signature he did not prepare the 1984 return he was presented a photocopy of (the original copy being unavailable); Trump asserted that he had been subjected to double taxation, in response to which the judge wrote that "The problem at issue is [instead one] of no taxation." In June 2016 (during Trump's presidential campaign), Johnston argued that the proceedings demonstrated evidence of intentional tax fraud.)

The Independent pointed out that hours after the organization was sentenced, Donald Trump Jr. made a social-media post ridiculing paying taxes, implying it supports foreign interests, namely Ukraine in its defense against Russian invasion.

Some political experts have argued that the fallout of the December 2022 criminal conviction would do little to damage Trump's political career due to his not being personally convicted. (Note: A political science practitioner at the University of New Haven states, "there's people that are so strongly into that sort of MAGA movement that nothing [Trump] does is going to turn them away.") Contrarily, some with inside knowledge of the investigations argue that Trump has been personally implicated via the guilty verdict against his company, despite denials of wrongdoing made on his behalf.

Writing for The New York Times, Maggie Haberman cited the investigations as being two of several against Trump highlighting his similar defensive tactics, summarized by former U.S. attorney and FBI official Chuck Rosenberg as being that "he thinks that everything can be bought or fought."

On February 22, 2023, Forbes reported that "new revelations about Trump Tower suggest that the building is—and always was—something of a fraud." The article cites (1) "Property records [showing] that [Trump] has been lying about the financial performance of the building since it first opened in 1983," (2) financial documents indicating that "Trump lied about the square footage of the office and retail space at the base of the property" (separate from the inflation of his penthouse), and (3) "Portions of a [newly released] 2015 audio recording [which] prove that Trump was personally involved in the efforts to lie about the value of Trump Tower's commercial space". Forbes concluded that "The Trump Organization lied about the value of its properties to lenders for years, and although multiple people ... participated ... the person at the center of the deceit was Donald Trump."

On April 12, Trump sued Cohen for allegedly revealing his confidences and "spreading falsehoods" about him, citing the criminal case. Cohen's lawyer Lanny Davis argued that "Trump appears once again to be using and abusing the judicial system as a form of harassment and intimidation," while Trump's lawyer Chris Kise argued that "at some point someone needs to hold this serial liar [Cohen] accountable." However, on October 5, the charges were dropped "without prejudice" (reserving the right to reiterate them later).

=== House probe of Bragg ===
On March 20, 2023, three House Republicans (Judiciary Committee Chair Jim Jordan, Oversight Committee Chair Jim Comer, and Administration Committee Chair Bryan Steil) sent Bragg a letter demanding documents and testimony related to the investigation. They called Trump's potential indictment "an unprecedented abuse of prosecutorial authority" based on "a novel legal theory" including purportedly expired statutes of limitations, saying the charge would "erode confidence in the evenhanded application of justice and unalterably interfere in the ... 2024 presidential election". They set a deadline of March 23 to discuss setting up a hearing before Congress they wanted Bragg to appear for. Jordan defended Trump's alleged wrongdoing as a "bookkeeping error" and asserted that Bragg's office was subject to congressional oversight because it receives federal grants. A DA spokesperson responded on March 20 that "We will not be intimidated by attempts to undermine the justice process, nor will we let baseless accusations deter us from fairly applying the law." On March 23, a DA lawyer called the demand unprecedented and illegitimate, saying it was based on Trump's assertion he would be indicted on March 21 and arguing that compliance would reveal confidential information and interfere with the investigation.

Though Pomerantz said in March that he would not cooperate with the House probe, on April 5, Jordan subpoenaed him for testimony about his resignation (initially scheduled for April 20); Bragg denounced the effort as an "attempt to undermine an active investigation". On April 11, Bragg sued Jordan over the House's efforts—calling them a "transparent campaign to intimidate and attack" his case as well as a "fishing expedition"—seeking to block the subpoena of Pomerantz and requests for other confidential evidence. The same day, U.S. federal judge Mary Kay Vyskocil denied the DA's request for emergency relief. (Note: Jordan asserted on Fox News that Bragg was trying to obstruct his investigation and was attempting to interfere with the 2024 election.) On April 19, Vyskocil ruled that the subpoena of Pomerantz was valid on the basis that Congress was probing a legislative issue, namely the use of federal funding. Bragg's team argued that, though federal funds were used in the case against the organization, they were not used to indict Trump. A lawyer for Pomerantz said his client saw the subpoena as "an improper attempt to obstruct and impede the pending prosecution" of Trump. Vyskocil accused both sides of politically charged rhetoric and criticized Bragg's lawsuit of being excessively negative about Trump. The same day, the Court of Appeals for the Second Circuit granted a temporary stay against the subpoena. Bragg and Pomerantz were given until April 21 to make further arguments, but that day they recanted the appeal, agreeing that Pomerantz could be questioned on May 12 in the presence of their general counsel. Pomerantz pleaded the Fifth in some of his answers that day.

Jordan set a Judiciary Committee hearing about Bragg on April 17, broadly alleging that his "pro-crime, anti-victim policies have led to an increase in violent crime". Mayor Adams and other city officials denounced the Judiciary Committee hearing, which Democrats painted as a Republican rouse against Bragg and C-SPAN opted not to televise. (Note: Top Democrat of the committee Jerry Nadler called the planned proceeding "an attack on our system of justice", while U.S. Senate Majority Leader Chuck Schumer said it would be "a circus if there ever was one".) Several witnesses were called, including individuals affected by actions of Bragg's they disagreed with.

== See also ==
- List of lawsuits involving Donald Trump
- Tax returns of Donald Trump
- False or misleading statements by Donald Trump
