= Chicago Lawyers' Committee For Civil Rights Under Law v. Craigslist, Inc. =

- Court: United States Court of Appeals for the Seventh Circuit
- Full case name: Chicago Lawyers' Committee For Civil Rights Under Law v. Craigslist, Inc.
- Decided: March 14, 2008
- Citation: 519 F.3d 666

Case history
- Prior history: Summary judgment for defendant, 461 F. Supp. 2d 681 (N.D. Ill. 2006)

Court membership
- Judges sitting: Frank H. Easterbrook, Diane Pamela Wood, Terence T. Evans

Case opinions
- Majority: Easterbrook, joined by a unanimous court

Chicago Lawyers' Committee For Civil Rights Under Law v. Craigslist, 519 F.3d 666 (7th Cir. 2008), is a Seventh Circuit decision affirming a lower court ruling that Section 230 of the Communications Decency Act (CDA) provides immunity to Internet service providers that "publish" classified ads that violate the Fair Housing Act (FHA).

== Background ==
Craigslist maintains a posting service that allows its customers to advertise rental properties. Some customer posted advertisements have included clauses like "NO MINORITIES" and "Requirements: Clean Godly Christian Male", both of which violate the provisions of the Fair Housing Act (FHA). While Craigslist has pulled such advertisements (and has a policy requiring customers who post classified ads to adhere to the FHA), Craigslist does not prescreen advertisements prior to publication on their site, and as of March 2006, still refuses to do so. Instead, Craigslist depends on users to report abusive advertisements, which are then examined and removed if found to be inappropriate. In 2006, Chicago Lawyers' Committee For Civil Rights Under Law sued Craigslist for maintaining the service in violation of the FHA.

Prior to trial, Craigslist CEO Jim Buckmaster publicly asserted that, "It is our understanding that the law is very clear to the effect that sites like Craigslist cannot be held legally liable for the content of postings submitted by end users." A lawyer for the Chicago housing group, Stephen Libowsky, disagreed with that assessment, stating that the goals of the lawsuit are to ensure that "...Internet places like Craigslist treated no differently than newspapers and other media who have traditionally been posting real estate advertisements. All of the gains are going to get lost if the same rules don't apply."

== District Court ruling ==
In November 2006, the U.S. District Court for the Northern District of Illinois held that Section 230 of the CDA provided a safe harbor for Internet service providers that "publish" classified ads that violate the FHA, which (among other things) prohibits discriminatory advertisements for housing. The plaintiffs appealed the decision to the Seventh Circuit.

== 7th Circuit ruling ==
The appeal was argued on February 15, 2008, before the Seventh Circuit. Chief Judge Frank Easterbrook issued an opinion on March 14, 2008, affirming the decision by the district court. The court noted the burden and ineffectiveness of imposing a duty on Craigslist to eliminate such postings: "[I]f postings had to be reviewed before being put online, long delay could make the service much less useful, and if the vetting came only after the material was online the buyers and sellers might already have made their deals. Every month more than 30 million notices are posted to the Craigslist system...fewer than 30 people...operate the system[.]" Additionally, the court stated "[u]sing the remarkably candid postings on Craigslist, the [plaintiffs] can identify many targets to investigate...and can collect damages from any landlord or owner who engages in discrimination[; but,] cannot sue the messenger just because the message reveals a third party's plan to engage in unlawful discrimination."
