= Mark F. Pomerantz =

American lawyer

Mark Pomerantz
- Born: Mark Floyd Pomerantz; May 3, 1951 (age 75); New York City, New York, U.S.
- Education: Harvard University (BA); University of Michigan (JD)

Mark Floyd Pomerantz (born May 3, 1951) is an American attorney. He is a member of the New York law firm Paul, Weiss, Rifkind, Wharton & Garrison. In February 2021, he left that firm to assist with the Manhattan District Attorney's investigation into the finances of former president Donald Trump until his resignation from the case in February 2022.

Pomerantz was subsequently targeted by the second Donald Trump administration as part of a larger retaliatory campaign by Trump against law firms and lawyers that he perceived as political opponents.

== Early life and education ==
Pomerantz was born in Brooklyn, and received a B.A. from Harvard College in 1972 and a J.D. from the University of Michigan Law School in 1975. He served as editor in chief of the Michigan Law Review and was elected to the Order of the Coif. He served as law clerk to Justice Potter Stewart of the U.S. Supreme Court and Judge Edward Weinfeld of the U.S. District Court for the Southern District of New York.

== Career ==
=== Career as prosecutor and defense attorney ===
He served as a federal prosecutor in the United States Attorney's Office for the Southern District of New York, eventually leading the appellate unit; he departed in 1982 for private practice. He defended numerous cases involving organized crime; his law partner later estimated that they handled about 25 cases related to organized crime. In one notable case regarding mobster Anthony Indelicato, Pomerantz argued on appeal to the U.S. Court of Appeals for the Second Circuit in 1989 that Indelicato had been involved with a single criminal episode—the simultaneous murder of Carmine Galante and two others in an attack in a Brooklyn restaurant— and thus could not be convicted of a "pattern of racketeering" as required for conviction under the Racketeer Influenced and Corrupt Organizations Act (RICO). The case was reheard en banc (i.e., by all twelve active judges on the appeals court), a rare step, leading to a decision clarifying the meaning of the RICO law.

After a stint on the faculty of Columbia Law School, Pomerantz established a small criminal defense law firm, Fischetti, Feigus & Pomerantz, before joining Rogers & Wells. Pomerantz then returned to the U.S. Attorney's Office to head its Criminal Division from 1997 to 1999, serving under U.S. Attorney Mary Jo White. As head of the office's Criminal Division, Pomerantz was involved in many trials, prosecuting mob boss John A. Gotti and many securities fraud defendants. He then joined the Paul, Weiss firm's litigation division as of counsel. He is an expert on white-collar crime. His clients at Paul, Weiss have included U.S. Senator Robert Torricelli of New Jersey, who was accused of campaign finance violations; hedge fund manager Anthony Chiasson; Credit Suisse First Boston banker Frank Quattrone; Joel L. Blumenfeld, a Queens justice of the New York Supreme Court; ImClone founder and chief executive Samuel D. Waksal; and New York Governor David A. Paterson. Pomerantz was the court-appointed receiver tasked with finding the assets of fraudster Marc Dreier; Pomerantz and his team successfully safeguarded over $100 million in assets so that Dreier's victims could be compensated. Like U.S. District Judge Jed Rakoff, Pomerantz has criticized the Federal Sentencing Guidelines as being excessively high.

Pomerantz served for 18 months as chairman of the Mayor's Commission to Combat Police Corruption, an unpaid position. Pomerantz was appointed to the six-member commission by Mayor Michael R. Bloomberg in August 2003. He resigned effective June 1, 2005, citing the time demands of his law practice. Pomerantz announced his resignation shortly after testifying to the New York City Council that the commission's effectiveness was inhibited due to its lack of subpoena power and disputes with New York City Police Department officials, who questioned the commission's jurisdiction to investigate issues such as overtime fraud, sexual misconduct and domestic violence by police officers, and the falsification of crime statistics. Pomerantz was mentioned in 2009 as a possible appointee as U.S. Attorney for the Southern District of New York; the job ultimately went to Preet Bharara. Pomerantz is a member of the advisory board of the Quattrone Center for the Fair Administration of Justice at the University of Pennsylvania Law School.

=== Trump investigation ===
On February 2, 2021, Pomerantz was sworn in as a special assistant district attorney (DA) in the office of New York County District Attorney Cyrus Vance Jr., to assist with that office's criminal investigation into the personal and business finances of former president Donald Trump. His hiring caused speculation that Vance was "ramping up" the grand jury investigation. Later that month, the U.S. Supreme Court rejected Trump's last appeal against a subpoena for his financial records; as a result, Trump's tax returns and other documents were released to the DA for use in its investigation, including possible use in obtaining grand jury subpoenas.

In April 2021, the Trump Organization hired attorney Ronald Fischetti, who was Pomerantz's law partner for eight years in the 1980s, to represent the company's interests with regard to Vance's investigation. His close familiarity with Pomerantz was regarded as an asset.

On February 23, 2022, Pomerantz resigned from his role as special assistant to the New York County District Attorney. Carey R. Dunne, who was also leading the investigation of Trump, also resigned. In his letter of resignation, Pomerantz expressed frustration at the decision of the new Manhattan district attorney, Alvin Bragg, to not pursue an indictment of Trump. Pomerantz said there was "evidence sufficient to establish Mr. Trump's guilt beyond a reasonable doubt" and that "the public interest warrants the criminal prosecution of Mr. Trump." Closing his letter, Pomerantz wrote: "I fear that your decision means that Mr. Trump will not be held fully accountable for his crimes. I have worked too hard as a lawyer, and for too long, now to become a passive participant in what I believe to be a grave failure of justice. I therefore resign from my position as a Special Assistant District Attorney, effective immediately." By April 2022, Pomerantz returned to Paul Weiss, as of counsel in its litigation department.

Pomerantz wrote a book about his involvement in the investigation of Trump, titled People vs. Donald Trump, which was released on February 7, 2023. In a pre-publication letter to the publisher, Bragg cautioned that the book might contain secret grand jury information related to the investigation, which he feared could be a setback to the inquiry. The DA's office asked for a 60-day publication delay so the office could review the material, as "Pomerantz has neither sought nor received approval to make disclosures relating to ongoing matters at the DA's office." However, publisher Simon & Schuster declined the request for a delay. Trump lawyer Joe Tacopina has threatened to sue Pomerantz for defamation because the book likened Trump to John Gotti. J. Anthony Jordan, the president of the District Attorneys Association of the State of New York, said Pomerantz violated professional standards "by writing and releasing a book in the midst of an ongoing case."

On March 20, 2025, the White House stated that the chairman of Paul, Weiss, Mr. Brad Karp, had acknowledged in a meeting that Pomerantz had committed wrongdoing. Pomerantz then released a statement saying that he had done nothing wrong in his role as a prosecutor.

== Works ==
- People vs. Donald Trump: An Inside Account. Simon & Schuster. February 7, 2023. ISBN 9781668022443.

== See also ==
- List of law clerks for the eighth seat of the Supreme Court of the United States
