= Chicago Lawyers' Committee for Civil Rights Under Law =

Consortium of American law firms

- Formation: 1969
- Founded at: Chicago, Illinois
- Services: Legal services
- Website: www.clccrul.org

The Chicago Lawyers' Committee for Civil Rights is a consortium of American law firms in Chicago that provides legal services in civil rights cases

The Committee focuses on seven major projects: the Education Equity Project, the Community Law Project, the Housing Opportunity Project, the Hate Crimes Project, Voting Rights Project, Police Accountability Project and Settlement Assistance Program.

The committee has recently worked to promote and protect civil rights in the Chicago metropolitan area through education, healthcare delivery, the environment, and voting rights.

== History ==
The committee was established in 1969 to provide pro bono legal services in significant civil rights cases. The first board of the Chicago Lawyers' Committee believed that "the poor and the black can become full and equal participants in our economic and political systems only when they achieve the power to deal on equal terms with public and private institutions. An essential element of that power is access to expert legal resources." From 1969 to 1970, federal judge David S. Tatel was a director of the committee.

Since 1976, the committee has operated as a separate, self-supporting, tax-exempt organization, although it continues to coordinate its activities with the National Lawyers' Committee and other local Lawyers' Committees throughout the country.

From nineteen firms in 1969, it has grown to 49 firms today. The majority of services are performed in Cook County, but the committee's influence in some projects is felt throughout the Midwest. Each year, over 18,000 hours of professional legal services, with an estimated value of approximately $8.5 million, is donated from its pool of over 1,000 volunteer lawyers.

== Significant cases ==
=== Craigslist controversy ===
In 2006, the Committee filed suit against craigslist, Inc., the owner of craigslist.org. They alleged that craigslist, Inc. was in violation of the federal Fair Housing Act because it allowed people to post discriminatory ads. The case was decided in favor of craigslist, and in 2008, in Chicago Lawyers' Committee For Civil Rights Under Law v. Craigslist, the Seventh Circuit upheld the finding that craigslist was not liable for the content of the ads.

=== Lewis firefighter case ===
The Committee filed a lawsuit against the City of Chicago in 1998 that argued that the Chicago Fire Department's use of a very high cut score on the 1995 firefighter entrance exam discriminated against African Americans. They filed the case on behalf of African Americans who scored between 65 and 89 on the test. There were nearly 7,000 African Americans in the plaintiff class.

In 2005, Judge Gottschall ruled in favor of the plaintiffs, and found that the city's use of the 89 cutoff score on the test was discriminatory, on several counts. The plaintiffs alleged that the very high cutoff score of 89, as compared to the 65 cutoff score that had previously been stated, had a disparate impact to discriminate against African Americans, since 78% of candidates above the cutoff were white. In the ruling, Judge Gottschall held that the city had not shown that the test effectively measured the skills it was supposed to measure, like the ability to learn from demonstration. Consequently, performance on the 1995 test did not predict performance in the Fire Academy or on the job.

This case has continued to be appealed, eventually reaching the Supreme Court, who ruled in favor of the plaintiffs in May 2010. The case was then sent to the Seventh Circuit Court of Appeals, where the City argued that plaintiffs failed to prove race discrimination when each hiring class is reviewed separately. During May 2011, the city's argument was rejected, representing a final victory for the plaintiffs on the merits of the case.

=== Parker and Pierce v. New Jerusalem Christian Development Corp. ===
Ms. Parker and Ms. Pierce were participants in the Chicago Housing Authority's "Choose to Own" program, which allows qualified families to use their Housing Choice Vouchers (Section 8) for mortgage payments on homes instead of rent. Housing developer New Jerusalem agreed to sell new homes to both women, but subsequently refused to finalize the sales when it learned that part of their mortgage payments would come from the City of Chicago subsidies. Specifically, New Jerusalem refused to sign the necessary CHA documents, knowing that without it, the sales could not be completed.

In February 2011, the Chicago Commission on Human Relations found that New Jerusalem violated the Chicago Fair Housing Ordinance by discriminating against Ms. Parker and Ms. Pierce based on their source of income. According to the Chicago's Fair Housing Ordinance, denial of housing based on source of income is illegal discrimination.

=== McFadden v. Board of Education for Illinois School Districts ===
In McFadden v. Board of Education for Illinois School District- a case involving educational inequities in the school district that includes Elgin, Illinois- federal District Court Judge Robert Gettleman issued a decision on July 11, 2013, holding that the school district has discriminated against Hispanic students in the operation of the district's gifted program. Over 40% of the students in the school district are Hispanic, but in recent years only 2% of the students in the district's elementary school gifted program have been Hispanic. This is in large part because the school district operates a separate program for gifted Hispanic students who learned English as a second language. Those students know English and are ready to participate in English-language classrooms and have been tested and found to be gifted, but are excluded from the mainstream gifted program.

As Judge Gettleman described it, this is "a separate, segregated program" that discriminates against Hispanic students, in violation of the Equal Protection Clause of the Fourteenth Amendment to the United States Constitution and the Illinois Civil Rights Act. Judge Gettleman wrote that "there is no question that the District placed gifted Hispanic students in SET/SWAS based solely on their cultural identity." The Judge held that the school district, while not motivated by an evil or racist motive, engaged in intentional discrimination: "The `inevitability or foreseeability of consequences' permits `a strong inference that the adverse effects were desired.'"

== Projects ==
=== Employment Opportunity Project ===
The Employment Opportunity Project challenges all forms of racial, national origin, and sexual discrimination in both public and private workplaces. Since 1973, EOP has pursued equality in the workplace through a variety of avenues:

- Employment Discrimination Litigation Program: The Committee litigates cases both in hiring and after a candidate has been hired, including sexual and racial harassment cases and discrimination in pay, promotion, and termination. The Committee assists and trains attorneys assigned under the United States District Court for the Northern District's Pro Bono Program. The Chicago Lawyers' Committee has litigated several significant cases through this program.
- Combatting Domestic Violence Stigma in the Workplace Program: The Committee represents and advocates on behalf of victims of domestic/sexual violence who are denied their rights to unpaid leave and accommodation under the Victims Economic Security & Safety Act (VESSA).
- EOP Advocacy: EOP also works with the federal and state agencies which enforce the employment discrimination laws to improve their procedures and enforcement efforts. For example, in 2006 EOP persuaded the Illinois Department of Human Rights to redact the names of workers who sue for arrest record discrimination from the IDHR's published opinions. The IDHR's publication of the workers' names and the details of their arrests had deterred workers from complaining of arrest record discrimination.

=== The Fair Housing Project ===
The committee's Fair Housing Project is to help eliminate housing discrimination based on race, national origin, familial status, physical and mental disability, sexual orientation, source of income, religion, gender, and other bases.

Staff and volunteers with the Fair Housing Project:

- educate tenants, homeowners, landlords, and others about their rights and duties under fair housing and fair lending laws,
- advocate for laws and public policies,
- conduct intake, referral, and investigation of housing discrimination complaints, and
- provide legal representation to individuals and groups in asserting and enforcing their fair housing rights and securing equal housing opportunities.

The committee is part of an area-wide network called CAFHA (Chicago Area Fair Housing Alliance), which works to combat housing discrimination and promote integrated communities of opportunity through research, education, and advocacy.

=== Hate Crimes Project ===
The committee's Hate Crimes Project is the resource center on hate crime prevention and response in the Midwestern United States. The Project advocates for strong criminal prosecutions of perpetrators of bias violence, litigates civil cases for hate crime victims, mobilizes community support for them, educates community residents and professionals about applicable laws, and advocates for improved enforcement of the Illinois Hate Crime Act. A citywide advisory board, consisting of attorneys who have represented victims and community activists representing diverse neighborhoods and constituents, provides guidance and assistance.

The project combats hate crimes in several ways:

- Litigation: The Hate Crimes Project also provides free legal representation to victims of hate crime, both in criminal prosecutions of offenders and in civil suits. The Project has litigated several significant cases.
- Education: The project trains both the general public and prosecutors on the Illinois Hate Crime Act, the importance of reporting, and the rights and needs of victims. Public forums and educational presentations are made in high-risk neighborhoods, utilizing the in-kind participation of police officers, community-based agency staff, private attorneys, clergy, community leaders, and health and social service professionals.
- Advocacy: The project advocates for strong criminal prosecutions of perpetrators of bias violence and improved enforcement of the Illinois Hate Crime Act.

=== The Law Project ===
Staff and volunteer attorneys provide free legal assistance to support community development efforts led by entrepreneurs and nonprofit organizations in Chicago's most underserved communities. The project's programs include:

- Nonprofit Assistance Program: The Law Project provides pro bono (free) legal assistance to nonprofit organizations working in low income communities in the Chicago area
- Small Business Assistance Program: The Law Project provides legal assistance to low income entrepreneurs .
- Homeownership Program: The Law Project provides legal assistance to Housing Choice Voucher holders and other first time home buyers

=== Settlement Assistance Project ===
The Settlement Assistance Project provides pro bono representation to low-income individuals with meritorious discrimination claims in federal court settlement conferences and US Equal Employment Commission mediations.

=== Voting Rights Project ===
The Chicago Lawyers' Committee Voting Rights Project aims to prevent, reduce, and eliminate barriers to voting for minority and low-income residents and to increase overall political participation. The project works to protect fair elections that allow every eligible voter the opportunity to vote and to have their vote counted.

This project will address the following issues:

- Election Protection: The Voting Rights Project partners with area law firms and nonprofit organizations to provide Election Protection during early voting and on Election Day. Election Protection volunteers answer voter questions and respond to issues In addition, teams of attorneys volunteer as poll watchers to monitor the election across the region.
- Advocacy: The Voting Rights Project works with election officials and community partners to advocate for better election practices and procedures. Through litigation, policy advocacy and community activism, we work to ensure that every registered voter has the right to case a meaningful ballot and rules are applied to voters in a fair and nondiscriminatory manner. The project advocates for policies that tend to decrease minority or low-income citizen participation in the electoral process. In addition, the project works in other areas, including redistricting, to promote fair representation.
- Voter Education and Empowerment: The Voting Rights Project encourages self-advocacy and educates community members about voting rights and the registration and election process. We work with coalition partners to encourage civic engagement and foster voter registration and participation in traditionally underrepresented communities.

=== Educational Equity Project ===
The Educational Equity Project (EEP) promotes civil rights in education and strong educational outcomes for minority children. The Committee believes that this is attainable by:

- increasing racial diversity in public schools;
- supporting local groups' efforts to lobby for educational equity in their own communities;
- doing everything possible to rehabilitate broken schools, and closing them as a last resort;
- encouraging schools to use restorative justice practices to provide the greatest opportunity for students to remain in school;
- promoting early intervention for students with disciplinary issues;
- ensuring that all students have access to fair disciplinary hearings;
- breaking the school-to-prison pipeline; using teachers' unions to ensure that students educational needs are being met;
- and ensuring that the focus of education policies or projects always revolves around increasing children's access to quality education.

=== Incarceration Prevention Project ===
The Project staff and volunteer attorneys seek to combat restrictions in employment for previously incarcerated individuals through advocacy and education both to reduce the rates of incarceration and to reduce the stigma of incarceration.

=== Environmental Justice Project ===
This project works to combat air pollution and placement of toxic waste dumps in low-income and minority neighborhoods.
