= David S. Tatel =

American judge (born 1942)

David Tatel
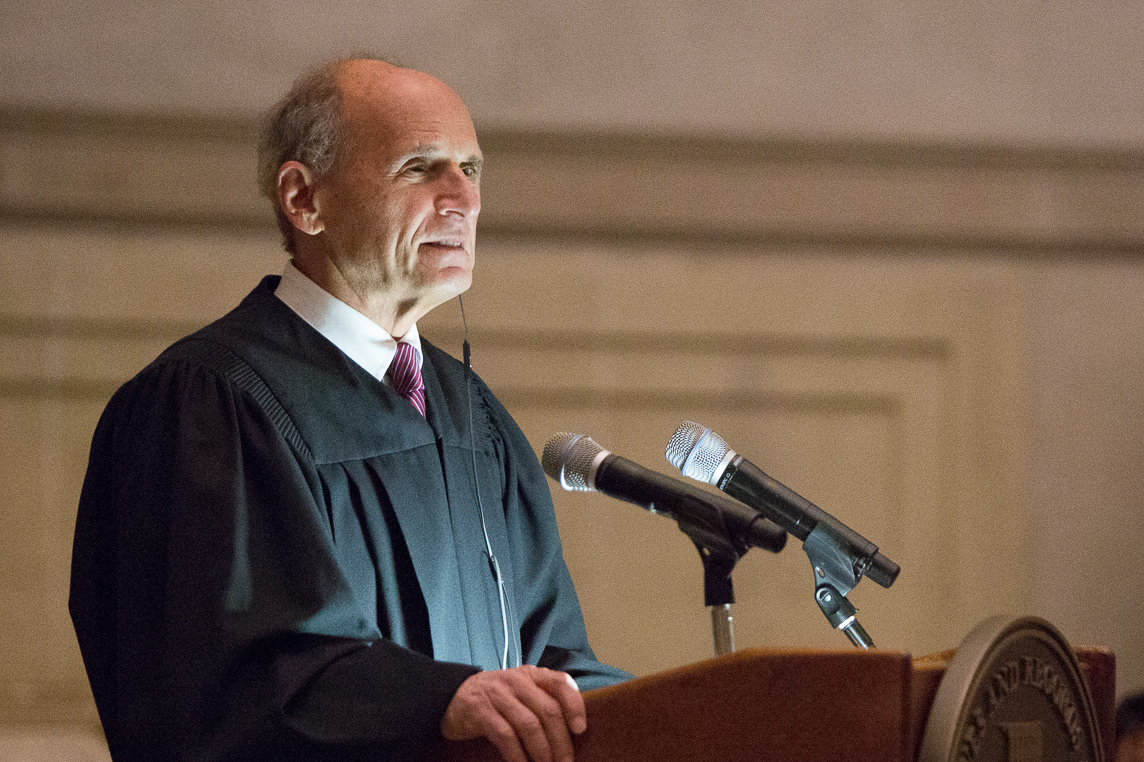
- Tatel during a naturalization ceremony at the National Archives, 2017

Senior Judge of the United States Court of Appeals for the District of Columbia Circuit
- In office May 16, 2022 – January 16, 2024

Judge of the United States Court of Appeals for the District of Columbia Circuit
- In office October 7, 1994 – May 16, 2022
- Appointed by: Bill Clinton
- Preceded by: Ruth Bader Ginsburg
- Succeeded by: J. Michelle Childs

Personal details
- Born: David Stephen Tatel; March 16, 1942 (age 84) Washington, D.C., U.S.
- Education: University of Michigan (BA); University of Chicago (JD)

David Stephen Tatel (born March 16, 1942) is an American lawyer who served as a United States circuit judge of the United States Court of Appeals for the District of Columbia Circuit.

== Early life ==
Tatel was born on March 16, 1942 to mother Molly Tatel and father Howard Tatel. He spent his early years living with his family in a small apartment in Washington D. C before the Tatels moved to a three bedroom house in Silver Spring, Maryland, which at the time was an almost all-white residential area. Along with his parents, he lived with his younger sister, Judy. Tatel was raised Jewish and attended Hebrew school after his regular public school day ended. As a boy, he was interested in science and was inspired by his father’s work as a physicist and astronomer. Tatel’s father died due to complications from brain surgery in 1957, shortly after the two of them returned from a geological research trip in South America.

When he was eight years old, Tatel started to lose some of his vision. Over the next few years, his vision worsened, particularly in dark environments or over long distances and by age twelve his vision loss was severe enough that he and his family began to seek a diagnosis. A doctor at the National Eye Institute diagnosed him with retinitis pigmentosa — a genetically linked degenerative eye condition— at age fifteen.

== Education and career ==
Tatel attended Montgomery Blair High School and graduated in 1959. He then began undergraduate studies at the University of Michigan as an engineering major. For two summers during college, He interned in Washington D.C. for the Bureau of Labor Statistics, prompting him to change his major to political science. Tatel received his Bachelor of Arts from the University of Michigan in 1963. He graduated from the University of Chicago Law School in 1966 with a J.D. degree.

After graduating, he returned to University of Michigan as a teaching fellow in their law school. Tatel then joined Sidley Austin in Chicago, where he worked on railroad cases and did pro bono work focused on desegregating Illinois public schools. He spent a brief time working for the Chicago Riot Study Committee, documenting unrest in and around the city’s schools, before returning to Sidley. In his role as founding director of the Chicago Lawyers’ Committee for Civil Rights Under Law he helped connect plaintiffs in racial discrimination cases with local legal representation. He then went on to become Director of the National Lawyers' Committee for Civil Rights Under Law. Tatel spent much of his career as a lawyer working around his vision loss without explicitly telling his coworkers about it and he did not begin to consistently disclose his declining vision until 1974.

During President Jimmy Carter’s administration, Tatel headed the Office of Civil Rights for the United States Department of Health, Education, and Welfare. The office was aimed at enforcing the Brown v. Board of Education ruling as well as Title VI of the Civil Rights Act. As director, Tatel oversaw an increase in staffing and focused on efforts to continue the desegregation of Chicago’s public schools and integrate North Carolina’s system of public universities.

In 1979, Tatel joined the law firm Hogan & Hartson (now Hogan Lovells), where he founded and headed the firm's education practice until his appointment to the D.C. Circuit. While on sabbatical from Hogan & Hartson, Tatel spent a year as a lecturer at Stanford Law School. He also previously served as Acting General Counsel for the Legal Services Corporation.

== Federal judicial service ==
Tatel was nominated by President Bill Clinton on June 20, 1994, to a seat on the U.S. Court of Appeals for the District of Columbia Circuit vacated by Judge Ruth Bader Ginsburg. He was confirmed by the United States Senate on October 6, 1994, by a voice vote, and received commission on October 7, 1994. He announced his intent to assume senior status upon confirmation of a successor on February 12, 2021. Tatel assumed senior status on May 16, 2022. He announced his plans to retire from the bench in September 2023 to return to a law firm where he worked before he became a federal judge. He retired from judicial service on January 16, 2024.

=== Notable rulings ===
Environment

In 1999, Tatel dissented in American Trucking v. United States EPA, a case about the EPA's power to set emission standards under the Clean Air Act. Tatel rejected the majority's invocation of the "nondelegation doctrine," arguing that the agency's actions were permissible. In a unanimous opinion written by Justice Antonin Scalia, the Supreme Court eventually reversed the majority's opinion, liberally adopting the reasoning of Tatel's dissent.

In 2005, Tatel was assigned to Massachusetts v. EPA, a case that centered on whether the Clean Air Act allowed the EPA to regulate greenhouse gases. In a dissenting opinion, Tatel sided with Massachusetts, finding that Congress had clearly given the EPA authority to regulate greenhouse gas emissions. The Supreme Court again agreed with Tatel, vacating the D.C. Circuit's opinion in a 5–4 decision.

In April 2020, Tatel wrote for the unanimous panel when it invalidated as arbitrary and capricious a directive by EPA Administrator Scott Pruitt attempting to prohibit scientists who had received EPA research grants from serving on its advisory panels.

Voting rights

In 2008, Tatel authored the majority opinion in Northwest Austin Mun. Util. Dist. One v. Mukasey, which held that Section 5 of the Voting Rights Act is constitutional. Less than four years later, Tatel also wrote the majority opinion in Shelby County v. Holder, again upholding the constitutionality of Section 5 of the Voting Rights. In a landmark voting rights decision, the Supreme Court eventually reversed his opinion by a 5–4 vote.

Privilege

Tatel dissented in two important attorney-client privilege cases. In 1997, he wrote the dissenting opinion in Swidler & Berlin v. United States, explaining that the notes from conversations between Vincent Foster and his attorney were protected by the attorney-client privilege even after Foster's death. The Supreme Court, in a 6–3 ruling, later sided with Tatel and ruled to protect the notes. The following year, Tatel concurred in part and dissented in part in In Re: Bruce Lindsey, a case involving whether Special Counsel Ken Starr could seek grand jury testimony about Monica Lewinsky from deputy White House counsel Bruce Lindsey. Tatel argued that presidents should enjoy attorney-client privilege in their communications with White House Counsel.

First Amendment

In 2005, Tatel authored a concurring opinion in In Re: Grand Jury Subpoena, Judith Miller, a case about whether the First Amendment allows reporters to refuse to disclose their sources to a grand jury. Tatel agreed with the majority that the First Amendment did not protect Judith Miller in the case, but he wrote separately to argue that federal courts should recognize a "reporter's privilege."

In 2020, Tatel authored the unanimous opinion in Karem v. Trump, which upheld a judge's order restoring a White House press pass to a reporter who got into an argument with one of President Donald Trump's supporters.

Guantanamo Bay

Tatel heard several appeals from prisoners held in the Guantanamo Bay Detention Camp. In 2017, Tatel, along with Judges Rogers and Griffith, wrote a per curiam opinion vacating a decision of a military judge against Khalid Sheikh Mohammad because of biased statements made by the judge against the defendant. In 2019, Tatel also wrote a majority opinion vacating decisions against Abd al-Rahim al-Nashiri, finding that the military judge wrongly hid his pursuit of a job with the government while presiding over al-Nashiri's case. Tatel dissented in a 2011 case involving Adnan Farhad Abd Al Latif, Al Latif v. Obama. Tatel would have upheld a district court decision ordering Al Latif's release under Boumediene v. Bush.

Disability

In 2019, Tatel authored the majority opinion in D.L. v. District of Columbia, a class action lawsuit filed by the parents of D.C. children. Tatel found that the District violated the "Child Find" requirement of the Individuals with Disabilities Education Act by failing to provide adequate special education services to D.C. children.

Other issues

In June 2017, Tatel found the Foreign Sovereign Immunities Act did not prevent the survivors of a Holocaust victim from suing to recover art stolen by Nazi plunderers, over the partial dissent of Senior Judge A. Raymond Randolph.

In October 2019, Tatel filed the majority opinion in Trump v. Mazars USA, LLP, finding that the U.S. House of Representatives Committee on Oversight and Reform had the authority to compel Mazars, via subpoena, to produce documents relating to the personal financial information of President Donald Trump, including several years' worth of income tax returns. That decision was vacated and remanded, 7–2, by the Supreme Court in an opinion written by Chief Justice John Roberts on July 9, 2020.

== Personal life ==
Tatel serves as co-chair of the National Academy of Sciences' Committee on Science, Technology, and Law. He is a member of the American Philosophical Society and the American Academy of Arts and Sciences. He serves on the Trustee Board of the Foundation Fighting Blindness. He chaired the Board of The Spencer Foundation from 1990 to 1997 and the Board of The Carnegie Foundation for the Advancement of Teaching from 2005 to 2009.

David Tatel and his wife, Dr. Edie Tatel met in the spring of 1965 and got married four months later. They have four children, eight grandchildren, and one great-grandchild.

Tatel learned to use a white cane in his late thirties and learned to read Braille over the course of his career, although he describes himself as having “limited Braille skills” when it comes to reading. During his time on the bench he edited his opinions via a combination of his clerks reading aloud and use of a Braille computer. He first began training to use Vixen, his German shepherd guide dog, in 2019. In 2026, Tatel announced on the Advisory Opinions podcast that Vixen had retired and he had a new guide dog, Xyrah.

== Recognition ==
In 2006, Tatel received an Alumni Medal from the University of Chicago. He holds honorary degrees from Macalaster College (2004) and Georgetown University (2010). In 2019, the Chicago Lawyers' Committee for Civil Rights granted its Legal Champion Award to Tatel. A year later, he was awarded the 2020 Henry Allen Moe Prize from the American Philosophical Society. Tatel also received the American Inns of Court Professionalism Award in 2023 and Legal Aid DC's Servant of Justice Award in 2024.

== Selected publications and speeches ==
- Tatel, David S. (September 13, 1997). Alexander F. Morrison Lecture. Annual Meeting of the California State Bar, San Diego, CA
- Tatel, David S. (June 25, 2002). Remarks of David S. Tatel on the Occasion of the Spencer Foundation's 30th Anniversary Dinner. Chicago, IL
- Tatel, David S. (October 16, 2003). Remarks on the Occasion of the Portrait Hanging Ceremony for the Honorable Patricia Wald. Washington, D.C.
- Tatel, David S. (January 19, 2004). Macalester College Graduation Ceremony Speech. St. Paul, MN
- Tatel, David S., Madison Lecture: Judicial Methodology, Southern School Desegregation, and the Rule of Law, 79 N.Y.U. L. Rev. 1071 (2004).
- Tatel, David S. (October 27, 2006). "Remarks on the Occasion of the Portrait Hanging Ceremony for the Honorable Stephen F. Williams". Washington, D.C.
- Tatel, David S. (November 15, 2008). Remarks of David S. Tatel. The American Philosophical Society, Philadelphia, PA
- Tatel, David S. (January 17, 2009). Litigation and Integration Then and Now. Delivered at Passing the Torch: the Past, Present, and Future of Interdistrict School Desegregation, Harvard Law School, Cambridge, MA
- Tatel, David S. (December 8, 2009). Remarks on the Occasion of the Portrait Hanging Ceremony for the Honorable James Robertson. Washington, D.C.
- Tatel, David S. (May 6, 2010). "Legacy of Supreme Court Justice John Paul Stevens". CSPAN, Washington, D.C.
- Tatel, David S. (April 23, 2012). Habeas Corpus: Remarks of Judge David S. Tatel. Cosmos Club, Washington, D.C.
- Tatel, David S. (April 5, 2013). Remarks on the Occasion of the Portrait Hanging Ceremony for the Honorable David B. Sentelle. Washington, D.C.
- Tatel, David S. (November 15, 2013). Remarks of David S. Tatel. The American Philosophical Society, Philadelphia, PA
- Tatel, David S. (April 28, 2018). Separation of Powers and Statutory Interpretation: A Battle Hidden in Plain Sight. The American Philosophical Society, Philadelphia, PA
- Tatel, David S. and Ruther Bader Ginsburg. (October 24, 2018). Tenth Annual Judge Thomas A. Flannery Lecture, Justice Ruth Bader Ginsburg. Flannery Lecture Series, Washington, D.C.
- Tatel, David S. (September 16, 2022). Expression of Gratitude on the Occasion of the Portrait Hanging Ceremony for the Honorable David S. Tatel. Washington, D.C.
- Tatel, David S. (March 18, 2022). "Life, Law, and Vision Loss with Judge Tatel". Hadley Helps.
- Liptak, Adam (May 27, 2024). "Lessons from Judge David Tatel's Guide Dog on Blindness and Vision". New York Times.
- Marimow, Ann E. (June 7, 2024). "Retired judge David Tatel issues a stark warning about the Supreme Court." The Washington Post.
- Tatel, David S. (June 11, 2024). Vision: A Memoir of Blindness and Justice. Little, Brown and Company.
- Tatel, David S. (June 11, 2024). "David S. Tatel Book Talk with Jane Mayer". Politics and Prose, Washington, D.C.
- Tatel, David S. (June 11, 2024). "Judge David Tatel on Becoming the Blind Role Model he Never Had." National Public Radio.
- Tatel, David S. (June 14, 2024). "Retired offers stark warning about U.S. Supreme Court". CNN, The Lead with Jake Tapper.
- Tatel, David S. (June 19, 2024). "Booknotes + Podcast – Judge David Tatel, 'Vision'". CSPAN, Washington, D.C.
- Tatel, David S. (July 3, 2024). "A Former Federal Judge Fears for Democracy". Fresh Air, NPR.

== See also ==
- List of first minority male lawyers and judges in the United States

Legal offices
Preceded by Ruth Bader Ginsburg	Judge of the United States Court of Appeals for the District of Columbia Circuit; 1994–2022	Succeeded by J. Michelle Childs
