= Trump v. Vance =

2020 Supreme Court decision on subpoenas

- Supreme Court of the United States

Argued May 12, 2020 Decided July 9, 2020
- Full case name: Donald J. Trump v. Cyrus R. Vance, Jr.
- Docket no.: 19-635
- Citations: 591 U.S. 786 (more) 140 S. Ct. 2412; 207 L. Ed. 2d 907; 2020 WL 3848062; 2020 U.S. LEXIS 3552.
- Argument: Oral argument

Holding
- Article II and the Supremacy Clause of the Constitution do not categorically preclude or require a heightened standard for the issuance of a state criminal subpoena to a sitting president.

Court membership
- Chief Justice John Roberts Associate Justices Clarence Thomas · Ruth Bader Ginsburg; Stephen Breyer · Samuel Alito; Sonia Sotomayor · Elena Kagan; Neil Gorsuch · Brett Kavanaugh

Case opinions
- Majority: Roberts, joined by Ginsburg, Breyer, Sotomayor, Kagan
- Concurrence: Kavanaugh (in judgment), joined by Gorsuch
- Dissent: Thomas
- Dissent: Alito

Laws applied
- U.S. Const. art. VI § 2 U.S. Const. art. II

Trump v. Vance, 591 U.S. 786 (2020), was a landmark United States Supreme Court case arising from a subpoena issued in August 2019 by Manhattan District Attorney Cyrus Vance Jr. against Mazars, then-President Donald Trump's accounting firm, for Trump's tax records and related documents, as part of his ongoing investigation into the Stormy Daniels scandal. Trump commenced legal proceedings to prevent their release.

The Court held that Article II and the Supremacy Clause of the U.S. Constitution do not categorically preclude or require a heightened standard for the issuance of a state criminal subpoena to a sitting president. The 7–2 decision was issued in July 2020, with Justices Samuel Alito and Clarence Thomas dissenting.

== Background ==
After Donald Trump indicated his intent to run for U.S. president as a Republican candidate, he was called upon to release his income tax returns in the public interest, as most other presidential candidates did. Trump had stated in his campaign that he would release them once they had been "worked on." After his election victory and taking office in 2017, Trump refused to give over his tax records and stated that voters were not interested in them.

The Democratic Party gained control of the U.S. House of Representatives in the 2018 midterm elections, and by April 2019, the House Ways and Means Committee had formally requested from the Internal Revenue Service (IRS) six years of Trump's returns, a power vested in Congress under 26 U.S.C. § 6103. The IRS failed to comply with the request. Both the Ways and Means Committee and the House Committee on Oversight and Reform filed subpoenas to Mazars, Trump's accounting firm, to obtain the tax information. The Trump administration refused to comply with the subpoenas and asserted that they lacked "a legitimate legislative purpose". However, those subpoenas were directed at Mazars and later at Deutsche Bank and Capital One, where Trump had accounts, and those entities had indicated they would comply with the subpoenas. Trump then tried to block the subpoenas, which led to two separate suits, Trump v. Mazars USA, LLP and Trump et al. v. Deutsche Bank AG, which were consolidated under the Trump v. Mazars suit by the Supreme Court in its 2019 term.

=== District Court ===
Separately, as part of the city's ongoing criminal investigation into the Stormy Daniels scandal, Manhattan District Attorney Cyrus Vance Jr. in August 2019 subpoenaed Mazars for Trump's tax returns. Trump filed suit against the district attorney and Mazars in the U.S. District Court for the Southern District of New York to block the subpoena, arguing that a sitting president enjoys "absolute immunity from criminal process of any kind".

Prosecutors countered that Trump had "sweeping immunity" from a criminal probe while he was in office and that Trump was "seeking to invent and enforce a new presidential 'tax return privilege,' on the theory that disclosing information in a tax return will necessarily reveal information that will somehow impede the functioning of a President, sufficiently to meet the test of irreparable harm."

The District Court dismissed the case on the basis of Younger v. Harris (1971), which had stated federal courts should abstain in the matters of tort claims being brought by the person facing prosecution for the underlying matters giving rise to those claims. As such, the District Court ordered Trump to comply with the subpoena, pending a ruling from the U.S. Court of Appeals for the Second Circuit.

=== Second Circuit ===
The Second Circuit panel ruled unanimously against Trump in November 2019. The decision stated that the president is not immune from "the enforcement of a state grand jury subpoena directing a third party to produce non-privileged material, even when the subject matter under investigation pertains to the President" and that a state grand jury may issue subpoenas "in aid of its investigation of potential crimes committed by persons within its jurisdiction, even if that investigation may in some way implicate the President."

== Supreme Court ==
Trump petitioned to the U.S. Supreme Court on the Second Circuit's ruling to the New York district attorney subpoena as well as in the separate cases related to the House Committee subpoenas. The Supreme Court agreed to take all three cases in December 2019, consolidating the two House Committee cases into Trump v. Mazars and handling the New York case under Trump v. Vance separately.

Oral arguments were held on May 12, 2020, alongside the Trump v. Mazars arguments, both as part of the set of cases held through teleconference because of the COVID-19 pandemic. Observers recognized that the Justices treated Vance, which involved a subpoena related to a grand jury criminal investigation, and Mazars, involving subpoenas related to a Congressional investigation, very differently and expected there to be different results between the cases, with Vance likely to favor the release of the tax records. Justices also spoke of possibly sending both cases to the lower courts with a set of standards to evaluate the subpoena requests.

=== Majority opinion ===
The Court released its decision on July 9, 2020, by affirming the decision of the Second Circuit and remanding the case for continued review. The 7–2 decision affirmed that absolute immunity to the president is not granted by the Supremacy Clause or Article II of the Constitution. Through those principles, the Court also held that the president enjoys no absolute immunity from state criminal subpoenas directed at his private papers and that he is not entitled to a heightened standard for the issuance of such a subpoena. Instead, the president can rely on the defenses that are available to everyone else like overbreadth and unwarranted harassment. In remanding the case to the District Court, the Court's order stated that "the President may raise further arguments as appropriate" to challenge the subpoena. In evaluating those arguments judges should be "meticulous" according to the Court, but "this does not mean they should use a stricter standard in evaluating them."

The majority opinion was written by Chief Justice John Roberts and joined by Justices Ruth Bader Ginsburg, Stephen Breyer, Sonia Sotomayor, and Elena Kagan. Roberts wrote that former Chief Justice John Marshall established the principle 200 years earlier that no citizen, including the president, may escape the common duty to produce evidence when he is called upon during a criminal proceeding. Roberts wrote, "In our judicial system, 'the public has a right to every man's evidence'. Since the earliest days of the Republic, 'every man' has included the President of the United States."

=== Concurring opinion ===
Justice Brett Kavanaugh wrote a concurring opinion joined by Justice Neil Gorsuch. Kavanaugh wrote that he would have held the case to the standard established in United States v. Nixon, which determined that a prosecutor must have a "demonstrated, specific need" for subpoenaing a president. Otherwise, Kavanaugh agreed with the judgment and added that the Court "unanimously agrees that this case should be remanded to the District Court, where the President may raise constitutional and legal objections to the subpoena as appropriate."

=== Dissenting opinions ===
Justices Clarence Thomas and Samuel Alito wrote separate dissenting opinions.

Thomas wrote that the majority opinion, which allowed subpoenas to be placed against the president, created an undue burden: "the demands on the president's time and the importance of his tasks are extraordinary, and the office of the president cannot be delegated to subordinates. A subpoena imposes both demands on the president's limited time and a mental burden, even when the president is not directly engaged in complying."

Alito wrote on his concern that the majority opinion would open the president to potential action from over 2000 local prosecutors and would impair the functionality of the presidential office: "Respect for the structure of government created by the Constitution demands greater protection for an institution that is vital to the nation's safety and well-being."

== Post-judgment ==
On the same day, the Trump v. Mazars case was remanded to the lower court by the Supreme Court with the same 7–2 split. Congress has the authority to subpoena the president as part of its legislative duties, but the Supreme Court found a stronger requirement to exist for the congressional subpoena than for a state grand jury subpoena. Chief Justice Roberts gave the lower courts a list of four considerations to determine when a congressional subpoena is appropriate within the scope of the separation of powers.

At the request of Vance, the Supreme Court on July 17, 2020, allowed the judgment from its ruling to take effect immediately, instead of the 25 days after decision normally established, to allow the district attorney's office to proceed to request documents while the judicial arguments continued.

=== Remand to District Court ===
On the remand of Trump v. Vance to the Southern New York District Court, Judge Victor Marrero set a deadline of July 15, 2020, for Trump to provide additional objections to the subpoena. Trump's revised complaint asserted that Vance's subpoena was politically motivated and overly broad. Marrero declined to block the subpoena on August 20, 2020, saying that Trump's new complaint was not substantially different from the first and dismissed Trump's case with prejudice, which allowed the subpoena to be executed. He concluded: "Justice requires an end to this controversy."

=== Appeal to Federal Court ===
On the next day, August 21, Trump's lawyers filed an emergency request with a federal appeals court to put the subpoena on hold, but the court denied his request that same day. Instead, the court granted him a hearing that was scheduled for September 1, but meanwhile, the subpoena remained in force. Trump's accounting records could have been given to the New York State grand jury before the hearing took place, but that did not happen. The appeals court ruled unanimously on October 7, 2020, to deny Trump's objection and ordered the subpoena to be obeyed.

=== Appeal to Supreme Court ===
Trump had stated his intent to appeal that ruling to the Supreme Court and was granted 12 days in which to do so and prosecutors delayed execution of the subpoena. On October 13, 2020, Trump submitted a petition to the Supreme Court for a stay pending its review of the appeals court decision.

On February 22, 2021, the Supreme Court denied the stay request, clearing the path for Trump's tax records as well as other records to be released to prosecutors for review by a grand jury.

== Disclosure of records ==
Within hours of the Supreme Court's ruling, Mazars handed over to Vance millions of pages of documents containing Trump's tax returns from January 2011 to August 2019, as well as financial statements, engagement agreements, documents relating to the preparation and review of tax returns, and work papers and communications related to the tax returns.

On February 23, 2021, the House Oversight and Reform Committee of the 117th Congress reissued its subpoena to Mazars seeking the same documents as had been provided to Vance, and which it had previously sought and been unable to obtain in Trump v. Mazars USA, LLP.

== See also ==
- Clinton v. Jones
- Doe et al. v. Trump Corp. et al.
- New York investigations of The Trump Organization
