= 2012 term United States Supreme Court opinions of Samuel Alito =

The 2012 term of the Supreme Court of the United States began October 1, 2012, and concluded October 6, 2013. This was the eighth term of Associate Justice Samuel Alito's tenure on the Court.
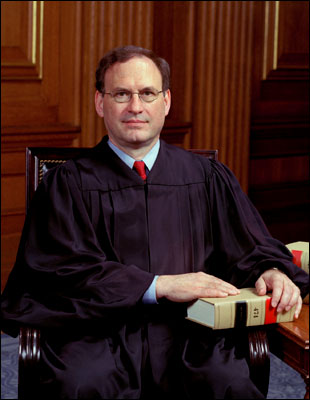

Samuel Alito 2012 term statistics

8	Majority or plurality	7	Concurrence	0	Other
9	Dissent	0	Concurrence/dissent	Total =	24
Bench opinions = 23		Opinions relating to orders = 1		In-chambers opinions = 0
Unanimous opinions: 1		Most joined by: Kennedy (11)		Least joined by: Ginsburg, Kagan (2)

Type	Case	Citation	Issues	Joined by	Other opinions
	Johnson v. Williams	568 U.S. 289, 292–306 (2013)	Antiterrorism and Effective Death Penalty Act of 1996 • habeas corpus • presumption of adjudication on the merits	Roberts, Kennedy, Thomas, Ginsburg, Breyer, Sotomayor, Kagan	Scalia
	Evans v. Michigan	568 U.S. 313, 330–41 (2013)	Fifth Amendment • Double Jeopardy Clause • legal error in court-directed acquittal		Sotomayor
	Clapper v. Amnesty International USA	568 U.S. 398, 401–22 (2013)	Foreign Intelligence Surveillance Act • Article III • standing	Roberts, Scalia, Kennedy, Thomas	Breyer
	Amgen Inc. v. Connecticut Retirement Plans and Trust Funds	568 U.S. 455, 482–83 (2013)	securities fraud • Securities Exchange Act of 1934 §10(b) • SEC Rule 10b-5 • fraud-on-the-market theory • materiality • class certification		Ginsburg; Scalia; Thomas
	Florida v. Jardines	569 U.S. 1, 16–26 (2013)	Fourth Amendment • detection dogs • curtilage	Roberts, Kennedy, Breyer	Scalia; Kagan
	Kiobel v. Royal Dutch Petroleum Co.	569 U.S. 108, 125–27 (2013)	Alien Tort Statute • extraterritoriality	Thomas	Roberts; Kennedy; Breyer
	Moncrieffe v. Holder	569 U.S. 184, 210–20 (2013)	Immigration and Nationality Act • ineligibility for discretionary relief due to aggravated felony		Sotomayor; Thomas
	McBurney v. Young	569 U.S. 221, 223–37 (2013)	Virginia Freedom of Information Act • Privileges and Immunities Clause • Dormant Commerce Clause	Unanimous	Thomas
	Boyer v. Louisiana	569 U.S. 238, 238–41 (2013)	Speedy Trial Clause • indigent right to counsel	Scalia, Thomas	per curiam; Sotomayor
Alito concurred in the Court's dismissal of certiorari as improvidently granted.
	Hillman v. Maretta	569 U.S. 483, 502–04 (2013)	Federal Employees' Group Life Insurance Act • designation of beneficiary • federal preemption		Sotomayor; Thomas
	Peugh v. United States	569 U.S. 530, 563 (2013)	Federal Sentencing Guidelines • Ex Post Facto Clause	Scalia	Sotomayor; Thomas
	Oxford Health Plans LLC v. Sutter	569 U.S. 564, 573–75 (2013)	Federal Arbitration Act • class arbitration	Thomas	Kagan
	Arizona v. Inter Tribal Council of Ariz., Inc.	570 U.S. 1, 38–47 (2013)	National Voter Registration Act of 1993 • Elections Clause • Arizona Proposition 200 (2004)		Scalia; Kennedy; Thomas
	Alleyne v. United States	570 U.S. 99, 132–35 (2013)	Sixth Amendment • right to a jury trial • mandatory minimum sentencing • judicial factfinding		Thomas; Breyer; Sotomayor; Roberts
	Salinas v. Texas	570 U.S. 178, 181–91 (2013)	Fifth Amendment • self-incrimination	Roberts, Kennedy	Thomas; Breyer
	Descamps v. United States	570 U.S. 254, 281–96 (2013)	Armed Career Criminal Act		Kagan; Kennedy; Thomas
	United States v. Kebodeaux	570 U.S. 387, 403–06 (2013)	Sex Offender Registration and Notification Act • Necessary and Proper Clause		Breyer; Roberts; Scalia; Thomas
	Vance v. Ball State Univ.	570 U.S. 421, 423–50 (2013)	Title VII • vicarious liability of supervisors	Roberts, Scalia, Kennedy, Thomas	Thomas; Ginsburg
	Mutual Pharmaceutical Co. v. Bartlett	570 U.S. 472, 475–93 (2013)	Federal Food, Drug, and Cosmetic Act • federal preemption • product liability	Roberts, Scalia, Kennedy, Thomas	Breyer; Sotomayor
	Koontz v. St. Johns River Water Management Dist.	570 U.S. 595, 599–619 (2013)	Fifth Amendment • Takings Clause • unconstitutional conditions doctrine	Roberts, Scalia, Kennedy, Thomas	Kagan
	Adoptive Couple v. Baby Girl	570 U.S. 637, 641–56 (2013)	Indian Child Welfare Act • termination of parental rights	Roberts, Kennedy, Thomas, Breyer	Thomas; Breyer; Scalia; Sotomayor
	Sekhar v. United States	570 U.S. 729, 738–43 (2013)	Hobbs Act • definition of extortion	Kennedy, Sotomayor	Scalia
	United States v. Windsor	570 U.S. 744, 802–18 (2013)	Fifth Amendment • equal protection • Defense of Marriage Act • same-sex marriage	Thomas (in part)	Kennedy; Roberts; Scalia
	Marrero v. United States	570 U.S. 929, 929–30 (2013)	Armed Career Criminal Act	Kennedy	
Alito dissented from the Court's decision to vacate and remand for reconsideration in light of Descamps v. United States, 570 U.S. 254 (2013).
