= 2012 term United States Supreme Court opinions of Clarence Thomas =

The 2012 term of the Supreme Court of the United States began October 1, 2012, and concluded October 6, 2013. This was the twenty-second term of Associate Justice Clarence Thomas's tenure on the Court.
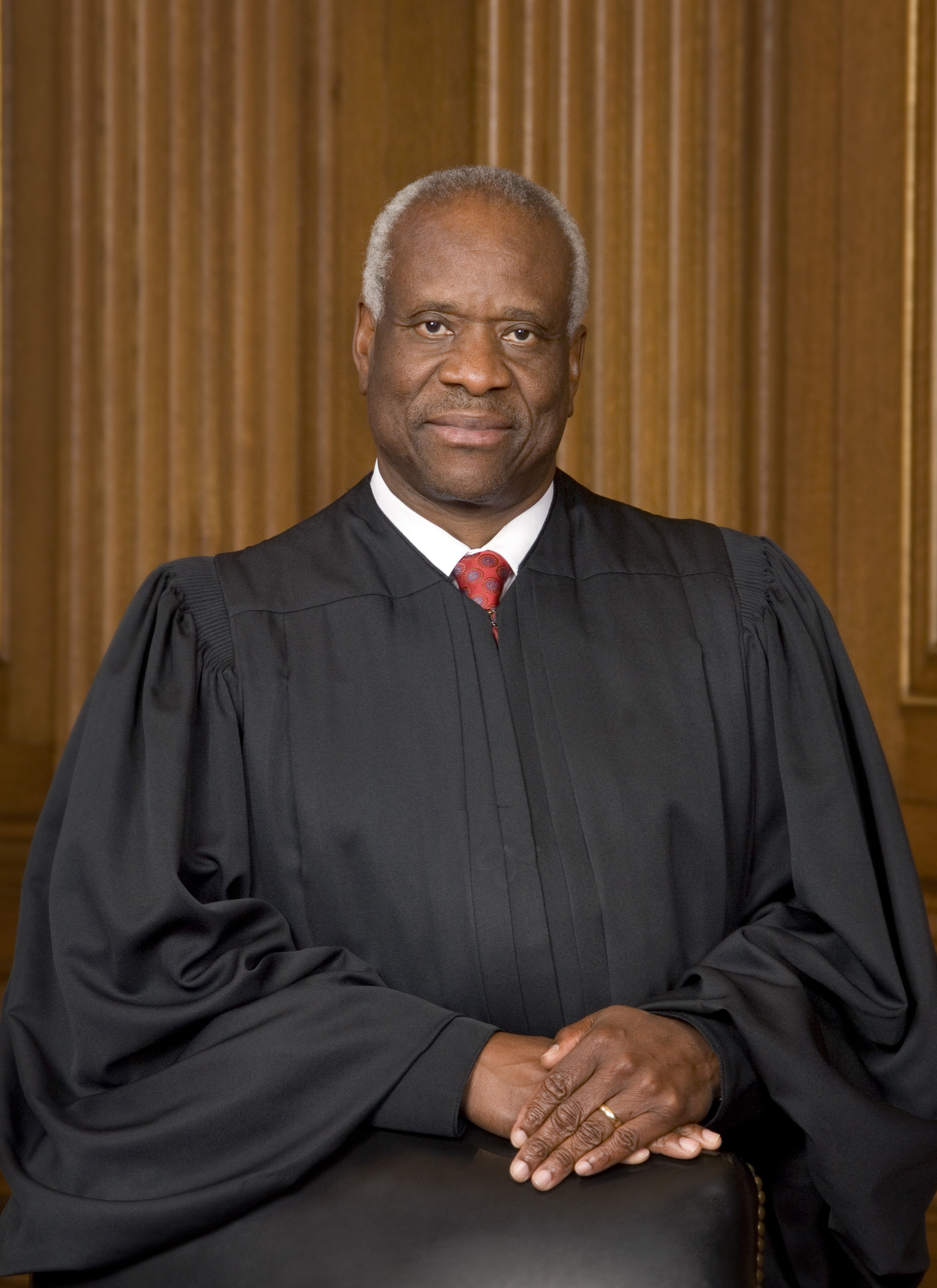

Clarence Thomas 2012 term statistics

8	Majority or plurality	11	Concurrence	0	Other
7	Dissent	0	Concurrence/dissent	Total =	26
Bench opinions = 25		Opinions relating to orders = 1		In-chambers opinions = 0
Unanimous opinions: 4		Most joined by: Scalia (11)		Least joined by: Sotomayor, Kagan (6)

Type	Case	Citation	Issues	Joined by	Other opinions
	Ryan v. Valencia Gonzales	568 U.S. 57, 60–77 (2013)	habeas corpus • competence	Unanimous	
Thomas's unanimous opinion for the Court held that a state prisoner petitioning for a federal writ of habeas corpus has no statutory right to suspend the proceedings when he is determined to be incompetent.
	Chaidez v. United States	568 U.S. 342, 358–59 (2012)	ineffective assistance of counsel • retroactivity of new rules of criminal procedure		Kagan; Sotomayor
	Marx v. General Revenue Corp.	568 U.S. 371, 373–88 (2012)	Fair Debt Collection Practices Act • Federal Rules of Civil Procedure • award of costs to prevailing plaintiff	Roberts, Scalia, Kennedy, Ginsburg, Breyer, Alito	Sotomayor
	Amgen Inc. v. Connecticut Retirement Plans and Trust Funds	568 U.S. 455, 486–502 (2013)	securities fraud • Securities Exchange Act of 1934 §10(b) • SEC Rule 10b-5 • fraud-on-the-market theory • materiality • class certification	Kennedy; Scalia (in part)	Ginsburg; Alito; Scalia
	Millbrook v. United States	569 U.S. 50, 51–57 (2013)	Federal Tort Claims Act • waiver of sovereign immunity for intentional torts by law enforcement	Unanimous	
	Genesis HealthCare Corp. v. Symczyk	569 U.S. 66, 69–79 (2013)	Fair Labor Standards Act • collective action • offer of judgment • mootness	Roberts, Scalia, Kennedy, Alito	Kagan
	Missouri v. McNeely	569 U.S. 141, 176–83 (2013)	Fourth Amendment • exigent circumstances • drunk driving • government-compelled blood alcohol test		Sotomayor; Kennedy; Roberts
	Moncrieffe v. Holder	569 U.S. 184, 207–10 (2013)	Immigration and Nationality Act • ineligibility for discretionary relief due to aggravated felony		Sotomayor; Alito
	McBurney v. Young	569 U.S. 221, 237 (2013)	Virginia Freedom of Information Act • Privileges and Immunities Clause • Dormant Commerce Clause		Alito
	PPL Corp. v. Commissioner	569 U.S. 329, 331–41 (2013)	UK Windfall Tax • foreign tax credit	Unanimous	Sotomayor
	Hillman v. Maretta	569 U.S. 483, 499–502 (2013)	Federal Employees' Group Life Insurance Act • designation of beneficiary • federal preemption		Sotomayor; Alito
	Horne v. Department of Agriculture	569 U.S. 513, 515–29 (2013)	Agricultural Marketing Agreement Act of 1937 • Takings Clause	Unanimous	
	Peugh v. United States	569 U.S. 530, 551–63 (2013)	Federal Sentencing Guidelines • Ex Post Facto Clause	Roberts, Scalia, Alito (in part)	Sotomayor; Alito
	Association for Molecular Pathology v. Myriad Genetics, Inc.	569 U.S. 576, 579–96 (2013)	patent law • gene patents • DNA extraction • BRCA mutation	Roberts, Kennedy, Ginsburg, Breyer, Alito, Sotomayor, Kagan; Scalia (in part)	Scalia
	American Trucking Assns., Inc. v. Los Angeles	569 U.S. 641, 655–57 (2013)	Federal Aviation Administration Authorization Act of 1994		Kagan
	Arizona v. Inter Tribal Council of Ariz., Inc.	570 U.S. 1, 22–38 (2013)	National Voter Registration Act of 1993 • Elections Clause • Arizona Proposition 200 (2004)		Scalia; Kennedy; Alito
	Alleyne v. United States	570 U.S. 99, 102–18 (2013)	Sixth Amendment • right to a jury trial • mandatory minimum sentencing • judicial factfinding	Ginsburg, Sotomayor, Kagan; Breyer (in part)	Breyer; Sotomayor; Roberts; Alito
	Salinas v. Texas	570 U.S. 178, 191–93 (2013)	Fifth Amendment • self-incrimination	Scalia	Alito; Breyer
	American Express Co. v. Italian Colors Restaurant	570 U.S. 228, 239 (2013)	Federal Arbitration Act • Sherman Antitrust Act • class action		Scalia; Kagan
	Descamps v. United States	570 U.S. 254, 279–81 (2013)	Armed Career Criminal Act		Kagan; Kennedy; Alito
	Fisher v. University of Texas at Austin	570 U.S. 297, 315–34 (2013)	affirmative action • race as factor in college admissions • Fourteenth Amendment • Equal Protection Clause		Kennedy; Scalia; Ginsburg
	United States v. Kebodeaux	570 U.S. 387, 407–20 (2013)	Sex Offender Registration and Notification Act • Necessary and Proper Clause	Scalia (in part)	Breyer; Roberts; Alito; Scalia
	Vance v. Ball State Univ.	570 U.S. 421, 450–51 (2013)	Title VII • vicarious liability of supervisors		Alito; Ginsburg
	Shelby County v. Holder	570 U.S. 529, 557–59 (2013)	Voting Rights Act of 1965 • coverage formula • preclearance • Fifteenth Amendment		Roberts; Ginsburg
	Adoptive Couple v. Baby Girl	570 U.S. 637, 656–66 (2013)	Indian Child Welfare Act • termination of parental rights		Alito; Breyer; Scalia; Sotomayor
	Lanus v. United States	570 U.S. 932, 932–33 (2013)	Federal Tort Claims Act • exclusion of lawsuits by military personnel		
Thomas dissented from the Court's denial of certiorari, in a case asking the Court to revisit its decision in Feres v. United States, 340 U.S. 135 (1950) that the FTCA did not allow military personnel to sue the government for the negligence of federal employees. Thomas argued that Feres should be overturned because the text of the FTCA provided no basis for such an exception.
