= 2012 term United States Supreme Court opinions of Antonin Scalia =

The 2012 term of the Supreme Court of the United States began October 1, 2012, and concluded October 6, 2013. This was the twenty-seventh term of Associate Justice Antonin Scalia's tenure on the Court.
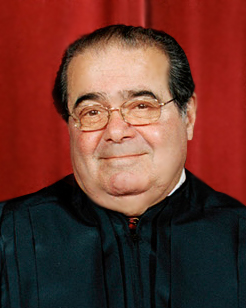

Antonin Scalia 2012 term statistics

8	Majority or plurality	5	Concurrence	0	Other
12	Dissent	1	Concurrence/dissent	Total =	26
Bench opinions = 24		Opinions relating to orders = 2		In-chambers opinions = 0
Unanimous opinions: 2		Most joined by: Thomas (16)		Least joined by: Breyer (4)

Type	Case	Citation	Issues	Joined by	Other opinions
	United States v. Bormes • [full text]	568 U.S. 6, 7–16 (2012)	Fair Credit Reporting Act • Little Tucker Act • waiver of sovereign immunity	Unanimous	
Scalia's unanimous opinion for the Court held that the Little Tucker Act had no applicability to claims brought under the FCRA. The purpose of the Little Tucker Act was to provide judicial remedies for claims against the federal government that were authorized by statutes that did not provide a method for enforcement. As such, it is a gap-filling statute, and so the Court ruled that its provisions do not apply when another statute itself sets forth the conditions by which it is to be enforced, as the FCRA does.
	Smith v. United States	568 U.S. 106, 107–14 (2013)	withdrawal from a conspiracy as affirmative defense • burden of proof • Due Process Clause	Unanimous	
	Bailey v. United States	568 U.S. 186, 203–06 (2013)	Fourth Amendment • detention incident to the execution of a search warrant	Ginsburg, Kagan	Kennedy; Breyer
	Henderson v. United States	568 U.S. 266, 280–88 (2013)	Federal Rules of Criminal Procedure • Rule 52(b) • plain error	Thomas, Alito	Breyer
	Johnson v. Williams	568 U.S. 289, 306–12 (2013)	Antiterrorism and Effective Death Penalty Act of 1996 • habeas corpus • presumption of adjudication on the merits		Alito
	Amgen Inc. v. Connecticut Retirement Plans and Trust Funds	568 U.S. 455, 483–86 (2013)	securities fraud • Securities Exchange Act of 1934 §10(b) • SEC Rule 10b-5 • fraud-on-the-market theory • materiality • class certification		Ginsburg; Alito; Thomas
	Decker v. Northwest Environmental Defense Center	568 U.S. 597, 616–26 (2013)	Clean Water Act • Industrial Stormwater rule		Kennedy; Roberts
	Haynes v. Thaler • [full text]	568 U.S. 970, 971–73 (2012)	ineffective assistance of counsel • procedural default	Thomas, Alito	Sotomayor
Scalia dissented from the Court's granting of a stay of execution.
	Florida v. Jardines	569 U.S. 1, 3–12 (2013)	Fourth Amendment • detection dogs • curtilage	Thomas, Ginsburg, Sotomayor, Kagan	Kagan; Alito
	Comcast Corp. v. Behrend	569 U.S. 27, 29–38 (2013)	antitrust law • class action certification	Roberts, Kennedy, Thomas, Alito	Ginsburg and Breyer
	US Airways, Inc. v. McCutchen	569 U.S. 88, 106–07 (2013)	Employee Retirement Income Security Act • health plan reimbursement from recovery from third parties • unjust enrichment • double-recovery rule • common-fund doctrine	Roberts, Thomas, Alito	Kagan
	Arlington v. FCC	569 U.S. 290, 293–307 (2013)	Telecommunications Act of 1996 • Chevron deference to agency interpretation of its own statutory jurisdiction	Thomas, Ginsburg, Sotomayor, Kagan	Breyer; Roberts
	McQuiggin v. Perkins	569 U.S. 383, 401–12 (2013)	Antiterrorism and Effective Death Penalty Act of 1996 • actual innocence • miscarriage of justice	Roberts, Thomas; Alito (in part)	Ginsburg
	Trevino v. Thaler	569 U.S. 413, 434 (2013)	ineffective assistance of counsel • procedural default	Thomas	Breyer; Roberts
	Maryland v. King	569 U.S. 435, 466–82 (2013)	Fourth Amendment • DNA profiling of arrestees • warrantless search	Ginsburg, Sotomayor, Kagan	Kennedy
	Association for Molecular Pathology v. Myriad Genetics, Inc.	569 U.S. 576, 596 (2013)	patent law • gene patents • DNA extraction • BRCA mutation		Thomas
	United States v. Davila	569 U.S. 597, 613 (2013)	Federal Rules of Criminal Procedure Rule 11 • vacatur of guilty pleas • prejudicial error	Thomas	Ginsburg
	Arizona v. Inter Tribal Council of Ariz., Inc.	570 U.S. 1, 4–20 (2013)	National Voter Registration Act of 1993 • Elections Clause • Arizona Proposition 200 (2004)	Roberts, Ginsburg, Breyer, Sotomayor, Kagan; Kennedy (in part)	Kennedy; Thomas; Alito
	Agency for Int'l Development v. Alliance for Open Society Int'l, Inc.	570 U.S. 205, 221–27 (2013)	United States Leadership Against HIV/AIDS, Tuberculosis, and Malaria Act of 2003 • Spending Clause • conditions imposed on recipients of federal funding • First Amendment • free speech	Thomas	Roberts
	American Express Co. v. Italian Colors Restaurant	570 U.S. 228, 231–39 (2013)	Federal Arbitration Act • Sherman Antitrust Act • class action	Roberts, Kennedy, Thomas, Alito	Thomas; Kagan
	Fisher v. University of Texas at Austin	570 U.S. 297, 315 (2013)	affirmative action • race as factor in college admissions • Fourteenth Amendment • Equal Protection Clause		Kennedy; Thomas; Ginsburg
	United States v. Kebodeaux	570 U.S. 387, 406 (2013)	Sex Offender Registration and Notification Act • Necessary and Proper Clause		Breyer; Roberts; Alito; Thomas
	Adoptive Couple v. Baby Girl	570 U.S. 637, 667–68 (2013)	Indian Child Welfare Act • termination of parental rights		Alito; Thomas; Breyer; Sotomayor
	Sekhar v. United States	570 U.S. 729, 730–38 (2013)	Hobbs Act • definition of extortion	Roberts, Thomas, Ginsburg, Breyer, Kagan	Alito
	United States v. Windsor	570 U.S. 744, 778–802 (2013)	Fifth Amendment • equal protection • Defense of Marriage Act • same-sex marriage	Thomas; Roberts (in part)	Kennedy; Roberts; Alito
	Brown v. Plata	570 U.S. 938, 938–40 (2013)	Prison Litigation Reform Act • prison overcrowding	Thomas	
Scalia dissented from the Court's denial of an application for a stay.
