= 2012 term United States Supreme Court opinions of Stephen Breyer =

The 2012 term of the Supreme Court of the United States began October 1, 2012, and concluded October 6, 2013. This was the nineteenth term of Associate Justice Stephen Breyer's tenure on the Court.
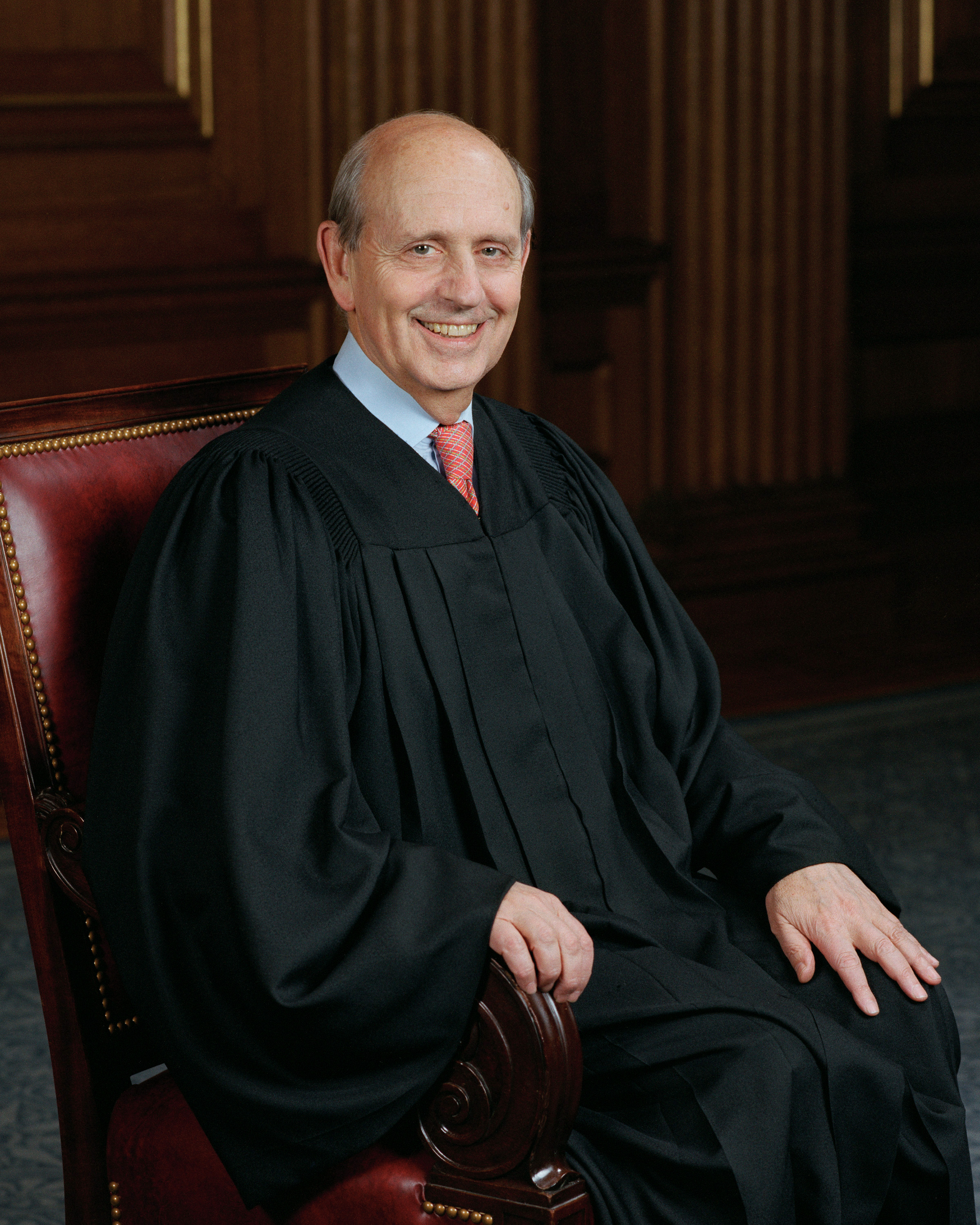

Stephen Breyer 2012 term statistics

8	Majority or plurality	5	Concurrence	1	Other
6	Dissent	0	Concurrence/dissent	Total =	20
Bench opinions = 18		Opinions relating to orders = 2		In-chambers opinions = 0
Unanimous opinions: 2		Most joined by: Sotomayor, Kagan (13)		Least joined by: Scalia (3)

Type	Case	Citation	Issues	Joined by	Other opinions
	Lozman v. City of Riviera Beach	568 U.S. 115, 118–33 (2013)	admiralty jurisdiction • status of floating house as "vessel" under Rules of Construction Act	Roberts, Scalia, Thomas, Ginsburg, Alito, Kagan	Sotomayor
	Bailey v. United States	568 U.S. 186, 206–14 (2013)	Fourth Amendment • detention incident to the execution of a search warrant	Thomas, Alito	Kennedy; Scalia
	Henderson v. United States	568 U.S. 266, 268–79 (2013)	Federal Rules of Criminal Procedure • Rule 52(b) • plain error	Roberts, Kennedy, Ginsburg, Sotomayor, Kagan	Scalia
	Clapper v. Amnesty International USA	568 U.S. 398, 422–41 (2013)	Foreign Intelligence Surveillance Act • Article III • standing	Ginsburg, Sotomayor, Kagan	Alito
	Kirtsaeng v. John Wiley & Sons, Inc.	568 U.S. 519, 523–54 (2013)	copyright law • first-sale doctrine • domestic sale of foreign-published works	Roberts, Thomas, Alito, Sotomayor, Kagan	Kagan; Ginsburg
	Standard Fire Ins. Co. v. Knowles	568 U.S. 588, 590–96 (2013)	Class Action Fairness Act of 2005 • diversity jurisdiction • amount in controversy	Unanimous	
	Wos v. E. M. A.	568 U.S. 627, 644–46 (2013)	Medicaid anti-lien provision • state recovery of tort awards for medical expenditures		Kennedy; Roberts
	Delling v. Idaho • [full text]	568 U.S. 1038, 1039–41 (2012)	insanity defense	Ginsburg, Sotomayor	
Breyer dissented from the Court's denial of certiorari, believing the Court should have reviewed whether Idaho's modification of the insanity defense violated the Fourteenth Amendment's Due Process Clause.
	Comcast Corp. v. Behrend	569 U.S. 27, 38–49 (2013)	antitrust law • class action certification	Sotomayor, Kagan	Scalia
Signed jointly with Ginsburg.
	Kiobel v. Royal Dutch Petroleum Co.	569 U.S. 108, 127–40 (2013)	Alien Tort Statute • extraterritoriality	Ginsburg, Sotomayor, Kagan	Roberts; Kennedy; Alito
	Bullock v. BankChampaign, N. A.	569 U.S. 267, 269–77 (2013)	bankruptcy law • discharge of debt • defalcation	Unanimous	
	Arlington v. FCC	569 U.S. 290, 308–12 (2013)	Telecommunications Act of 1996 • Chevron deference to agency interpretation of its own statutory jurisdiction		Scalia; Roberts
	Trevino v. Thaler	569 U.S. 413, 416–29 (2013)	ineffective assistance of counsel • procedural default	Kennedy, Breyer, Sotomayor, Kagan	Roberts; Scalia
	Alleyne v. United States	570 U.S. 99, 122–24 (2013)	Sixth Amendment • right to a jury trial • mandatory minimum sentencing • judicial factfinding		Thomas; Sotomayor; Roberts; Alito
	FTC v. Actavis, Inc.	570 U.S. 136, 140–60 (2013)	Drug Price Competition and Patent Term Restoration Act of 1984 • Federal Trade Commission Act • generic drugs	Kennedy, Ginsburg, Sotomayor, Kagan	Roberts
	Salinas v. Texas	570 U.S. 178, 193–204 (2013)	Fifth Amendment • self-incrimination	Ginsburg, Sotomayor, Kagan	Alito; Thomas
	United States v. Kebodeaux	570 U.S. 387, 389–99 (2013)	Sex Offender Registration and Notification Act • Necessary and Proper Clause	Kennedy, Ginsburg, Sotomayor, Kagan	Roberts; Alito; Scalia; Thomas
	Mutual Pharmaceutical Co. v. Bartlett	570 U.S. 472, 493–96 (2013)	Federal Food, Drug, and Cosmetic Act • federal preemption • product liability	Kagan	Alito; Sotomayor
	Adoptive Couple v. Baby Girl	570 U.S. 637, 666–67 (2013)	Indian Child Welfare Act • termination of parental rights		Alito; Thomas; Scalia; Sotomayor
	Gallow v. Cooper	570 U.S. 933, 933–34 (2013)	ineffective assistance of counsel	Sotomayor	
Breyer filed a statement respecting the Court's denial of certiorari.
