= 2012 term United States Supreme Court opinions of Ruth Bader Ginsburg =

The 2012 term of the Supreme Court of the United States began October 1, 2012, and concluded October 6, 2013. This was the twentieth term of Associate Justice Ruth Bader Ginsburg's tenure on the Court.
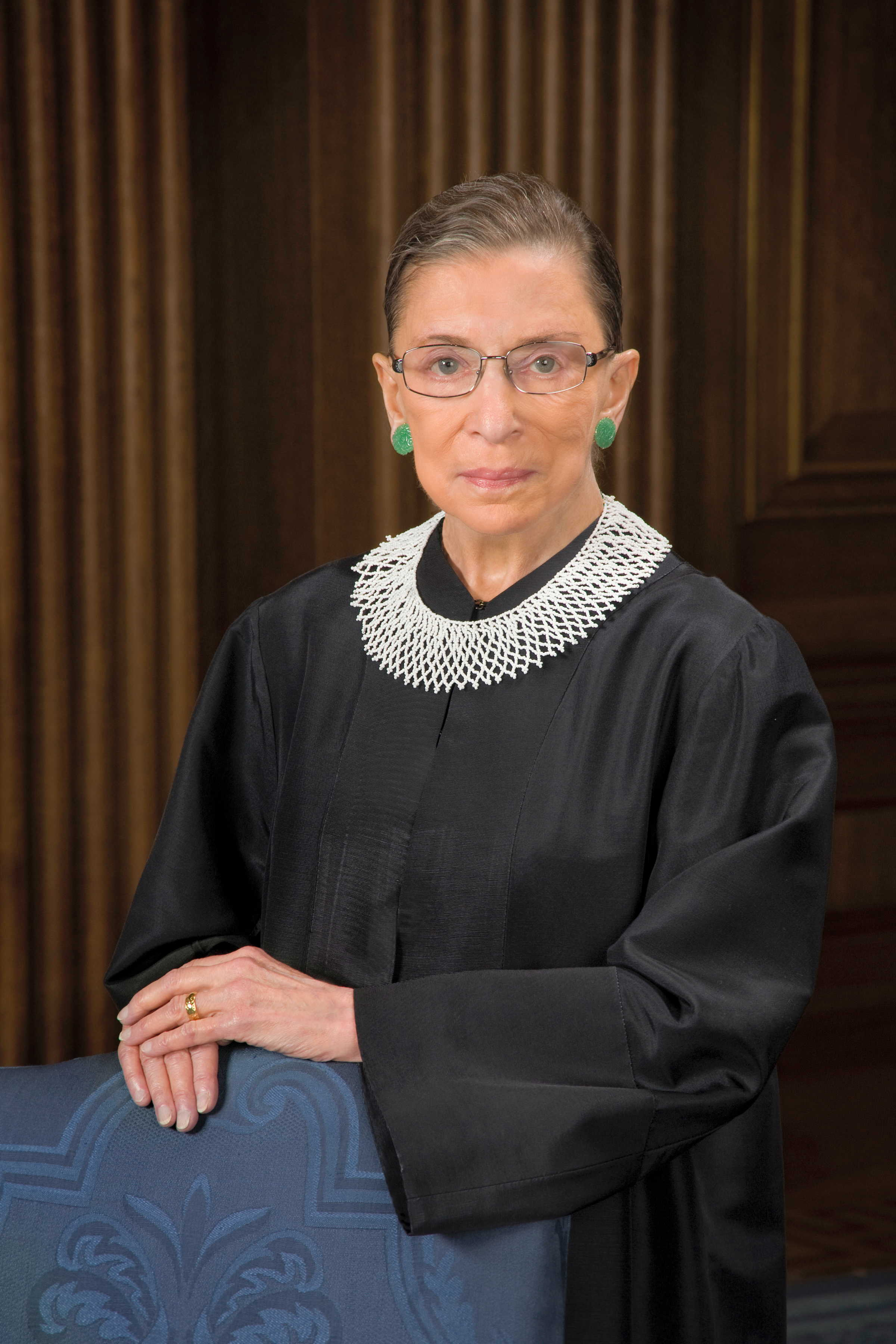

Ruth Bader Ginsburg 2012 term statistics

| 9 | Majority or plurality | 1 | Concurrence | 0 | Other |
| 7 | Dissent | 0 | Concurrence/dissent | Total = | 17 |
| Bench opinions = 17 | | Opinions relating to orders = 0 | | In-chambers opinions = 0 |
| Unanimous opinions: 3 | | Most joined by: Sotomayor (14) | | Least joined by: Thomas (6) |

| Type | Case | Citation | Issues | Joined by | Other opinions |
|---|---|---|---|---|---|
| | Arkansas Game and Fish Comm’n v. United States • [full text] | 568 U.S. 23, 26–40 (2012) | Takings Clause • flood control | Roberts, Scalia, Kennedy, Thomas, Breyer, Alito, Sotomayor | |
Ginsburg's opinion for the Court held that government-induced, temporary flooding was not categorically excluded from liability under the Takings Clause.
| | Los Angeles County Flood Control Dist. v. Natural Resources Defense Council, Inc. | 568 U.S. 78, 80–84 (2013) | Clean Water Act | Roberts, Scalia, Kennedy, Thomas, Breyer, Sotomayor, Kagan | |
| | Sebelius v. Auburn Regional Medical Center | 568 U.S. 145, 148–61 (2013) | low income patient adjustment to health care provider Medicare reimbursement • Provider Reimbursement Review Board • statute of limitations for appealing administrative decision • equitable tolling | Unanimous | Sotomayor |
| | Chafin v. Chafin | 568 U.S. 165, 180–85 (2013) | International Child Abduction Remedies Act • Article III • Case or Controversy Clause • mootness | Scalia, Breyer | Roberts |
| | Amgen Inc. v. Connecticut Retirement Plans and Trust Funds | 568 U.S. 455, 458–82 (2013) | securities fraud • Securities Exchange Act of 1934 §10(b) • SEC Rule 10b-5 • fraud-on-the-market theory • materiality • class certification | Roberts, Breyer, Alito, Sotomayor, Kagan | Alito; Scalia; Thomas |
| | Levin v. United States | 568 U.S. 503, 505–18 (2013) | Federal Tort Claims Act • Gonzalez Act • Federal Employees Liability Reform and Tort Compensation Act • medical battery | Roberts, Kennedy, Thomas, Breyer, Alito, Sotomayor, Kagan; Scalia (in part) | |
| | Kirtsaeng v. John Wiley & Sons, Inc. | 568 U.S. 519, 557–87 (2013) | copyright law • first-sale doctrine • domestic sale of foreign-published works | Kennedy; Scalia (in part) | Breyer; Kagan |
| | Comcast Corp. v. Behrend | 569 U.S. 27, 38–49 (2013) | antitrust law • class action certification | Sotomayor, Kagan | Scalia |
Signed jointly with Breyer.
| | Dan's City Used Cars, Inc. v. Pelkey | 569 U.S. 251, 254–66 (2013) | Federal Aviation Administration Authorization Act of 1994 • federal preemption • state regulation of car towing | Unanimous | |
| | Metrish v. Lancaster | 569 U.S. 351, 354–68 (2013) | Antiterrorism and Effective Death Penalty Act of 1996 • due process • retroactive abolition of affirmative defense | Unanimous | |
| | McQuiggin v. Perkins | 569 U.S. 383, 386–401 (2013) | Antiterrorism and Effective Death Penalty Act of 1996 • actual innocence • miscarriage of justice | Kennedy, Breyer, Sotomayor, Kagan | Scalia |
| | United States v. Davila | 569 U.S. 597, 600–13 (2013) | Federal Rules of Criminal Procedure Rule 11 • vacatur of guilty pleas • prejudicial error | Roberts, Kennedy, Breyer, Alito, Sotomayor, Kagan | Scalia |
| | Maracich v. Spears | 570 U.S. 48, 81–98 (2013) | Freedom of Information Act • Driver's Privacy Protection Act of 1994 • attorney solicitation of clients | Scalia, Sotomayor, Kagan | Kennedy |
| | Fisher v. University of Texas at Austin | 570 U.S. 297, 334–37 (2013) | affirmative action • race as factor in college admissions • Fourteenth Amendment • Equal Protection Clause | | Kennedy; Scalia; Thomas |
| | University of Tex. Southwestern Medical Center v. Nassar | 570 U.S. 338, 363–86 (2013) | Title VII • employer retaliation • causation | Breyer, Sotomayor, Kagan | Kennedy |
| | Vance v. Ball State Univ. | 570 U.S. 421, 451–71 (2013) | Title VII • vicarious liability of supervisors | Breyer, Sotomayor, Kagan | Alito; Thomas |
| | Shelby County v. Holder | 570 U.S. 529, 559–94 (2013) | Voting Rights Act of 1965 • coverage formula • preclearance • Fifteenth Amendment | Breyer, Sotomayor, Kagan | Roberts; Thomas |
