= 2012 term United States Supreme Court opinions of Sonia Sotomayor =

The 2012 term of the Supreme Court of the United States began October 1, 2012, and concluded October 6, 2013. This was the fourth term of Associate Justice Sonia Sotomayor's tenure on the Court.
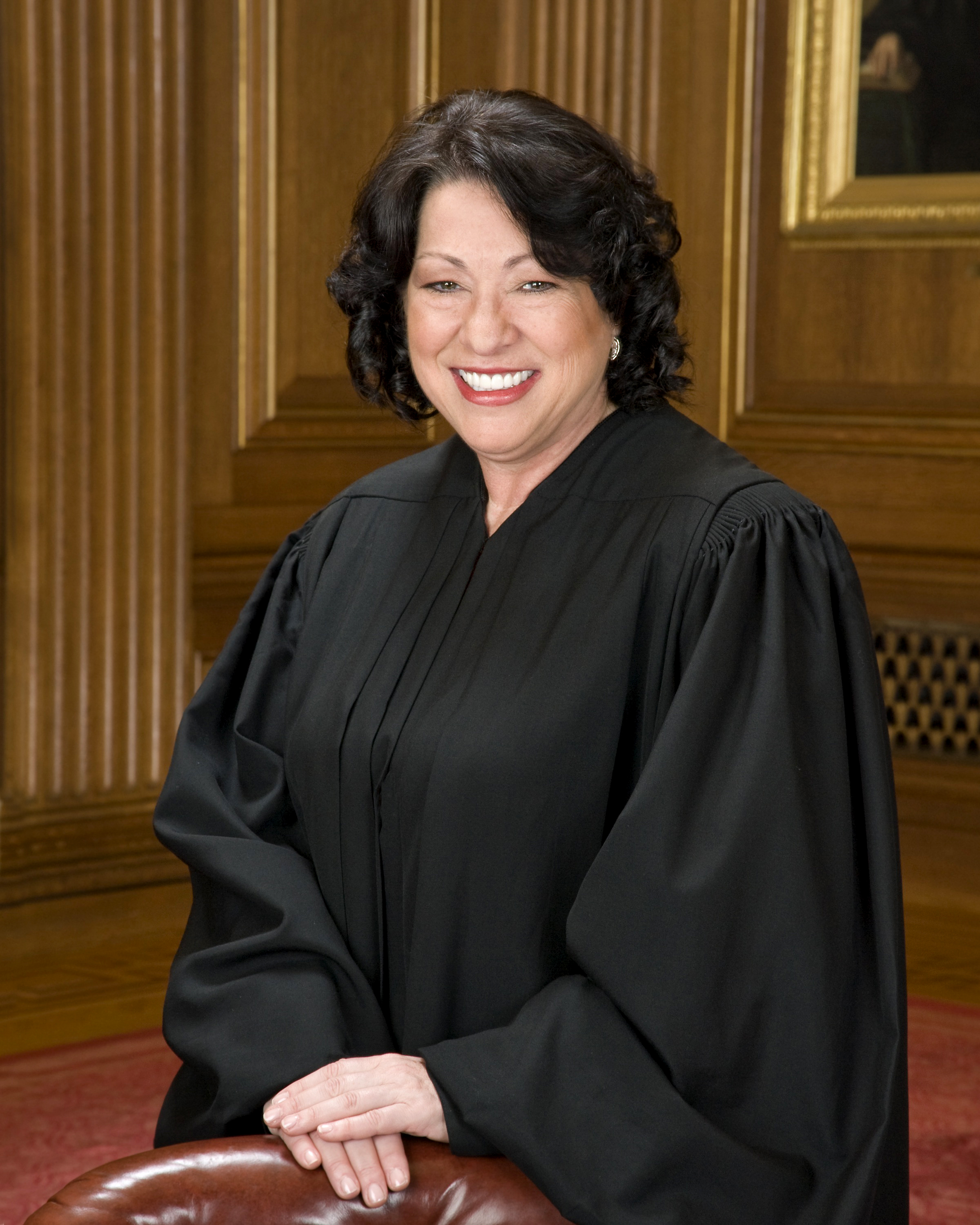

Sonia Sotomayor 2012 term statistics

8	Majority or plurality	3	Concurrence	3	Other
7	Dissent	0	Concurrence/dissent	Total =	21
Bench opinions = 17		Opinions relating to orders = 3		In-chambers opinions = 1
Unanimous opinions: 2		Most joined by: Ginsburg (13)		Least joined by: Thomas (2 in full, 1 in part)

Type	Case	Citation	Issues	Joined by	Other opinions
	Lozman v. City of Riviera Beach	568 U.S. 115, 134-44 (2013)	admiralty jurisdiction • status of floating house as "vessel" under Rules of Construction Act	Kennedy	Breyer
	Sebelius v. Auburn Regional Medical Center	568 U.S. 145, 161-64 (2013)	low income patient adjustment to health care provider Medicare reimbursement • Provider Reimbursement Review Board • statute of limitations for appealing administrative decision • equitable tolling		Ginsburg
	FTC v. Phoebe Putney Health System, Inc.	568 U.S. 216, 219-36 (2013)	antitrust law • state-action immunity defense	Unanimous	
	Evans v. Michigan	568 U.S. 313, 315-30 (2013)	Fifth Amendment • Double Jeopardy Clause • legal error in court-directed acquittal		Alito
	Chaidez v. United States	568 U.S. 342, 359-70 (2012)	ineffective assistance of counsel • retroactivity of new rules of criminal procedure	Ginsburg	Kagan; Thomas
	Marx v. General Revenue Corp.	568 U.S. 371, 388-97 (2012)	Fair Debt Collection Practices Act • Federal Rules of Civil Procedure • award of costs to prevailing plaintiff	Kagan	Thomas
	Haynes v. Thaler • [full text]	568 U.S. 970, 971 (2012)	ineffective assistance of counsel • procedural default	Ginsburg	Scalia
Sotomayor filed a statement respecting the Court's granting of a stay of execution.
	Hodge v. Kentucky • [full text]	568 U.S. 1056, 1056-63 (2012)	death penalty • ineffective assistance of counsel • mitigating factors		
Sotomayor dissented from the Court's denial of certiorari in a death penalty case. The defendant's attorney had failed to investigate or present any mitigating factors at sentencing, despite the defendant's history of severe physical and emotional abuse as a child. The state supreme court decided that failure to present this mitigation evidence was not prejudicial because it would not have "explained" the defendant's violent murder, which Sotomayor wrote was the wrong standard.
	Calhoun v. United States	568 U.S. 1206, 1206-09 (2012)	racist remarks by prosecutor • forfeiture on appeal	Breyer	
Sotomayor filed a statement respecting the Court's denial of certiorari.
	Hobby Lobby Stores, Inc. v. Sebelius • [full text]	568 U.S. 1401, 1401-04 (2012)	Patient Protection and Affordable Care Act • contraceptive mandate • Religious Freedom Restoration Act		
Sotomayor denied an application for an injunction pending appellate review.
	Missouri v. McNeely	569 U.S. 141, 144-65 (2013)	Fourth Amendment • exigent circumstances • drunk driving • government-compelled blood alcohol test	Scalia, Ginsburg, Kagan; Kennedy (in part)	Kennedy; Roberts; Thomas
	Moncrieffe v. Holder	569 U.S. 184, 187-207 (2013)	Immigration and Nationality Act • ineligibility for discretionary relief due to aggravated felony	Roberts, Scalia, Kennedy, Ginsburg, Breyer, Kagan	Thomas; Alito
	Boyer v. Louisiana	569 U.S. 238, 241-50 (2013)	Speedy Trial Clause • indigent right to counsel	Ginsburg, Breyer, Kagan	per curiam; Alito
Sotomayor dissented from the Court's dismissal of certiorari as improvidently granted.
	PPL Corp. v. Commissioner	569 U.S. 329, 344-50 (2013)	UK Windfall Tax • foreign tax credit		Thomas
	Sebelius v. Cloer	569 U.S. 369, 371-82 (2013)	National Childhood Vaccine Injury Act of 1986 • statute of limitations • award of attorney's fees	Roberts, Kennedy, Ginsburg, Breyer, Alito, Kagan; Scalia, Thomas (in part)	
	Hillman v. Maretta	569 U.S. 483, 485-99 (2013)	Federal Employees' Group Life Insurance Act • designation of beneficiary • federal preemption	Roberts, Kennedy, Ginsburg, Breyer, Kagan; Scalia (in part)	Thomas; Alito
	Peugh v. United States	569 U.S. 530, 532-51 (2013)	Federal Sentencing Guidelines • Ex Post Facto Clause	Ginsburg, Breyer, Kagan; Kennedy (in part)	Thomas; Alito
	Tarrant Regional Water Dist. v. Herrmann	569 U.S. 614, 618-40 (2013)	Red River Compact • riparian water rights • Dormant Commerce Clause	Unanimous	
	Alleyne v. United States	570 U.S. 99, 118-22 (2013)	Sixth Amendment • right to a jury trial • mandatory minimum sentencing • judicial factfinding	Ginsburg, Kagan	Thomas; Breyer; Roberts; Alito
	Mutual Pharmaceutical Co. v. Bartlett	570 U.S. 472, 496-520 (2013)	Federal Food, Drug, and Cosmetic Act • federal preemption • product liability	Ginsburg	Alito; Breyer
	Adoptive Couple v. Baby Girl	570 U.S. 637, 668-92 (2013)	Indian Child Welfare Act • termination of parental rights	Ginsburg, Kagan; Scalia (in part)	Alito; Thomas; Breyer; Scalia
