= 2012 term United States Supreme Court opinions of John Roberts =

The 2012 term of the Supreme Court of the United States began October 1, 2012, and concluded October 6, 2013. This was the eighth term of Chief Justice John Roberts's tenure on the Court.
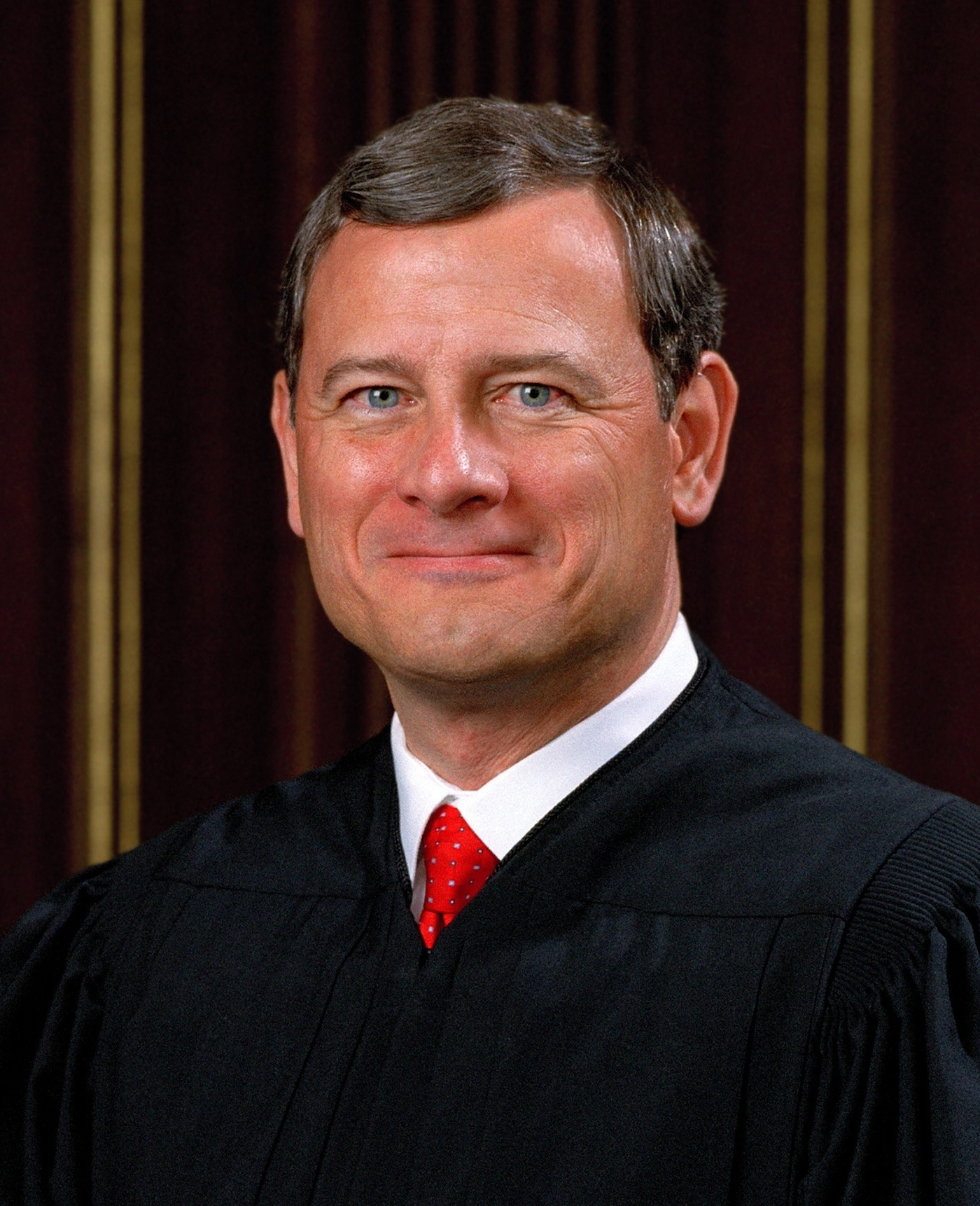

John Roberts 2012 term statistics

8	Majority or plurality	2	Concurrence	0	Other
6	Dissent	1	Concurrence/dissent	Total =	17
Bench opinions = 17		Opinions relating to orders = 0		In-chambers opinions = 0
Unanimous opinions: 4		Most joined by: Alito (11)		Least joined by: Sotomayor, Kagan (5)

Type	Case	Citation	Issues	Joined by	Other opinions
	Already, LLC v. Nike, Inc.	568 U.S. 85, 88–102 (2013)	Article III • Case or Controversy Clause • mootness	Unanimous	Kennedy
	Chafin v. Chafin	568 U.S. 165, 168–180 (2013)	International Child Abduction Remedies Act • Article III • Case or Controversy Clause • mootness	Unanimous	Ginsburg
	Gunn v. Minton	568 U.S. 251, 253–265 (2013)	patent law • legal malpractice • subject-matter jurisdiction	Unanimous	
Roberts' unanimous opinion for the Court held that a state court had jurisdiction to decide a legal malpractice lawsuit that required resolution of a patent law issue, because the lawsuit did not "arise under" federal patent law and thus did not fall within federal courts' exclusive subject-matter jurisdiction over patent law claims.
	Gabelli v. SEC	568 U.S. 442, 444–454 (2013)	Investment Advisers Act • statute of limitations	Unanimous	
Roberts' unanimous opinion for the Court held that the five-year statute of limitations within which the SEC must seek civil penalties under the Investment Advisers Act begins when the fraud occurs, not when it is discovered.
	Decker v. Northwest Environmental Defense Center	568 U.S. 597, 615–16 (2013)	Clean Water Act • Industrial Stormwater rule	Alito	Kennedy; Scalia
	Wos v. E. M. A.	568 U.S. 627, 647–66 (2013)	Medicaid anti-lien provision • state recovery of tort awards for medical expenditures	Scalia, Thomas	Kennedy; Breyer
	Kiobel v. Royal Dutch Petroleum Co.	569 U.S. 108, 111–25 (2013)	Alien Tort Statute • extraterritoriality	Scalia, Kennedy, Thomas, Alito	Kennedy; Breyer; Alito
	Missouri v. McNeely	569 U.S. 141, 166–76 (2013)	Fourth Amendment • exigent circumstances • drunk driving • government-compelled blood alcohol test	Breyer, Alito	Sotomayor; Kennedy; Thomas
	Arlington v. FCC	569 U.S. 290, 312–28 (2013)	Telecommunications Act of 1996 • Chevron deference to agency interpretation of its own statutory jurisdiction	Kennedy, Alito	Scalia; Breyer
	Trevino v. Thaler	569 U.S. 413, 430–34 (2013)	ineffective assistance of counsel • procedural default	Alito	Breyer; Scalia
	Alleyne v. United States	570 U.S. 99, 124–32 (2013)	Sixth Amendment • right to a jury trial • mandatory minimum sentencing • judicial factfinding	Scalia, Kennedy	Thomas; Breyer; Sotomayor; Alito
	FTC v. Actavis, Inc.	570 U.S. 136, 160–77 (2013)	Drug Price Competition and Patent Term Restoration Act of 1984 • Federal Trade Commission Act • generic drugs	Scalia, Thomas	Breyer
	Agency for Int'l Development v. Alliance for Open Society Int'l, Inc.	570 U.S. 205, 208–21 (2013)	United States Leadership Against HIV/AIDS, Tuberculosis, and Malaria Act of 2003 • Spending Clause • conditions imposed on recipients of federal funding • First Amendment • free speech	Kennedy, Ginsburg, Breyer, Alito, Sotomayor	Scalia
	United States v. Kebodeaux	570 U.S. 387, 399–403 (2013)	Sex Offender Registration and Notification Act • Necessary and Proper Clause		Breyer; Alito; Scalia; Thomas
	Shelby County v. Holder	570 U.S. 529, 534–557 (2013)	Voting Rights Act of 1965 • coverage formula • preclearance • Fifteenth Amendment	Scalia, Kennedy, Thomas, Alito	Thomas; Ginsburg
	Hollingsworth v. Perry	570 U.S. 693, 697–715 (2013)	Article III • standing • California Proposition 8	Scalia, Ginsburg, Breyer, Kagan	Kennedy
	United States v. Windsor	570 U.S. 744, 775–78 (2013)	Fifth Amendment • equal protection • Defense of Marriage Act • same-sex marriage		Kennedy; Scalia; Alito
