= 2012 term United States Supreme Court opinions of Elena Kagan =

The 2012 term of the Supreme Court of the United States began October 1, 2012, and concluded October 6, 2013. This was the third term of Associate Justice Elena Kagan's tenure on the Court.
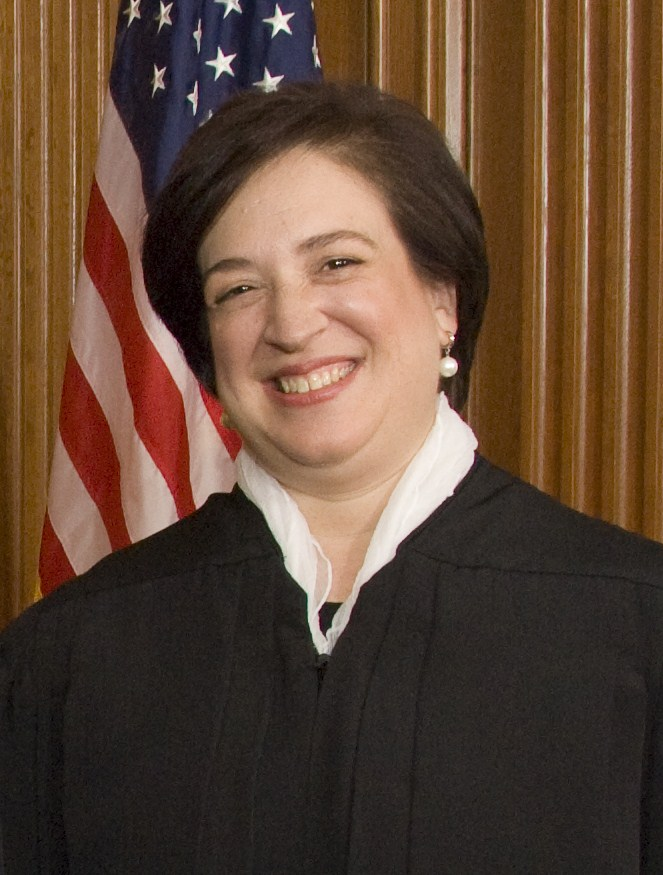

Elena Kagan 2012 term statistics

| 8 | Majority or plurality | 2 | Concurrence | 0 | Other |
| 3 | Dissent | 0 | Concurrence/dissent | Total = | 13 |
| Bench opinions = 13 | | Opinions relating to orders = 0 | | In-chambers opinions = 0 |
| Unanimous opinions: 5 | | Most joined by: Ginsburg, Breyer (11) | | Least joined by: Thomas (5) |

| Type | Case | Citation | Issues | Joined by | Other opinions |
|---|---|---|---|---|---|
| | Kloeckner v. Solis | 568 U.S. 41, 43–56 (2012) | Civil Service Reform Act | Unanimous | |
| | Florida v. Harris | 568 U.S. 237, 240–50 (2012) | Fourth Amendment • detection dogs establishing probable cause | Unanimous | |
| | Chaidez v. United States | 568 U.S. 342, 344–58 (2012) | ineffective assistance of counsel • retroactivity of new rules of criminal procedure | Roberts, Scalia, Kennedy, Breyer, Alito | Thomas; Sotomayor |
| | Kirtsaeng v. John Wiley & Sons, Inc. | 568 U.S. 519, 554–57 (2013) | copyright law • first-sale doctrine • domestic sale of foreign-published works | Alito | Breyer; Ginsburg |
| | Florida v. Jardines | 569 U.S. 1, 12–16 (2013) | Fourth Amendment • detection dogs • curtilage | Ginsburg, Sotomayor | Scalia; Alito |
| | Genesis HealthCare Corp. v. Symczyk | 569 U.S. 66, 79–87 (2013) | Fair Labor Standards Act • collective action • offer of judgment • mootness | Ginsburg, Breyer, Sotomayor | Thomas |
| | US Airways, Inc. v. McCutchen | 569 U.S. 88, 91–106 (2013) | Employee Retirement Income Security Act • health plan reimbursement from recovery from third parties • unjust enrichment • double-recovery rule • common-fund doctrine | Kennedy, Ginsburg, Breyer, Sotomayor | Scalia |
| | Bowman v. Monsanto Co. | 569 U.S. 278, 280–89 (2013) | patent exhaustion • genetically modified crops | Unanimous | |
| | Oxford Health Plans LLC v. Sutter | 569 U.S. 564, 565–73 (2013) | Federal Arbitration Act • class arbitration | Unanimous | Alito |
| | American Trucking Assns., Inc. v. Los Angeles | 569 U.S. 641, 644–55 (2013) | Federal Aviation Administration Authorization Act of 1994 | Unanimous | Thomas |
| | American Express Co. v. Italian Colors Restaurant | 570 U.S. 228, 240-53 (2013) | Federal Arbitration Act • Sherman Antitrust Act • class action | Ginsburg, Breyer | Scalia; Thomas |
| | Descamps v. United States | 570 U.S. 254, 257-78 (2013) | Armed Career Criminal Act | Roberts, Scalia, Kennedy, Ginsburg, Breyer, Sotomayor | Kennedy; Thomas; Alito |
| | Koontz v. St. Johns River Water Management Dist. | 570 U.S. 595, 619-36 (2013) | Fifth Amendment • Takings Clause • unconstitutional conditions doctrine | Ginsburg, Breyer, Sotomayor | Alito |
