= 2012 term United States Supreme Court opinions of Anthony Kennedy =

The 2012 term of the Supreme Court of the United States began October 1, 2012, and concluded October 6, 2013. This was the twenty-sixth term of Associate Justice Anthony Kennedy's tenure on the Court.
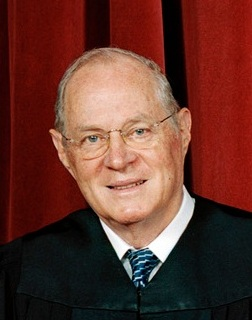

Anthony Kennedy 2012 term statistics

8	Majority or plurality	5	Concurrence	0	Other
1	Dissent	0	Concurrence/dissent	Total =	14
Bench opinions = 14		Opinions relating to orders = 0		In-chambers opinions = 0
Unanimous opinions: 0		Most joined by: Alito (8)		Least joined by: Scalia (3 in full, 1 in part)

Type	Case	Citation	Issues	Joined by	Other opinions
	Already, LLC v. Nike, Inc.	568 U.S. 85, 102–05 (2013)	Article III • Case or Controversy Clause • mootness	Thomas, Alito, Sotomayor	Roberts
	Bailey v. United States	568 U.S. 186, 189–202 (2013)	Fourth Amendment • detention incident to the execution of a search warrant	Roberts, Scalia, Ginsburg, Sotomayor, Kagan	Scalia; Breyer
	Decker v. Northwest Environmental Defense Center	568 U.S. 597, 601–15 (2013)	Clean Water Act • Industrial Stormwater rule	Roberts, Thomas, Ginsburg, Alito, Sotomayor, Kagan; Scalia (in part)	Roberts; Scalia
	Wos v. E. M. A.	568 U.S. 627, 630–44 (2013)	Medicaid anti-lien provision • state recovery of tort awards for medical expenditures	Ginsburg, Breyer, Alito, Sotomayor, Kagan	Breyer; Roberts
	Kiobel v. Royal Dutch Petroleum Co.	569 U.S. 108, 125 (2013)	Alien Tort Statute • extraterritoriality		Roberts; Breyer; Alito
	Missouri v. McNeely	569 U.S. 141, 165–66 (2013)	Fourth Amendment • exigent circumstances • drunk driving • government-compelled blood alcohol test		Sotomayor; Roberts; Thomas
	Maryland v. King	569 U.S. 435, 439–66 (2013)	Fourth Amendment • routine DNA profiling of arrestees • warrantless search	Roberts, Thomas, Breyer, Alito	Scalia
	Arizona v. Inter Tribal Council of Ariz., Inc.	570 U.S. 1, 20–22 (2013)	National Voter Registration Act of 1993 • Elections Clause • Arizona Proposition 200 (2004)		Scalia; Thomas; Alito
	Maracich v. Spears	570 U.S. 48, 51–78 (2013)	Freedom of Information Act • Driver's Privacy Protection Act of 1994 • attorney solicitation of clients	Roberts, Thomas, Breyer, Alito	Ginsburg
	Descamps v. United States	570 U.S. 254, 278–79 (2013)	Armed Career Criminal Act		Kagan; Thomas; Alito
	Fisher v. University of Texas at Austin	570 U.S. 297, 300–15 (2013)	affirmative action • race as factor in college admissions • Fourteenth Amendment • Equal Protection Clause	Roberts, Scalia, Thomas, Breyer, Alito, Sotomayor	Scalia; Thomas; Ginsburg
	University of Tex. Southwestern Medical Center v. Nassar	570 U.S. 338, 342–63 (2013)	Title VII • employer retaliation • causation	Roberts, Scalia, Thomas, Alito	Ginsburg
	Hollingsworth v. Perry	570 U.S. 693, 715–28 (2013)	Article III • standing • California Proposition 8	Thomas, Alito, Sotomayor	Roberts
	United States v. Windsor	570 U.S. 744, 749–75 (2013)	Fifth Amendment • equal protection • Defense of Marriage Act • same-sex marriage	Ginsburg, Breyer, Sotomayor, Kagan	Roberts; Scalia; Alito
