= Arkansas Game & Fish Commission v. United States =

Arkansas Game and Fish Commission v. United States
- Supreme Court of the United States

Argued October 3, 2012 Decided December 4, 2012
- Full case name: Arkansas Game and Fish Commission v. United States
- Docket no.: 11-597
- Citations: 568 U.S. 23 (more) 133 S. Ct. 511; 184 L. Ed. 2d 417; 2012 U.S. LEXIS 9409; 75 ERC 1417; 81 U.S.L.W. 4013
- Argument: Oral argument

Case history
- Prior: Judgment for plaintiff, 87 Fed. Cl. 594 (2009); reversed, 637 F.3d 1366 (Fed. Cir. 2011); cert. granted, 566 U.S. 920 (2012).

Holding
- Government-induced recurrent floodings, even if temporary in duration, are not categorically exempt from Takings Clause liability.

Court membership
- Chief Justice John Roberts Associate Justices Antonin Scalia · Anthony Kennedy; Clarence Thomas · Ruth Bader Ginsburg; Stephen Breyer · Samuel Alito; Sonia Sotomayor · Elena Kagan

Case opinion
- Majority: Ginsburg, joined by Roberts, Scalia, Kennedy, Thomas, Breyer, Alito, Sotomayor
- Kagan took no part in the consideration or decision of the case.

Laws applied
- U.S. Const. amend. V

Arkansas Game and Fish Commission v. United States, 568 U.S. 23 (2012), is a decision by the Supreme Court of the United States holding that it was possible for government-induced, temporary flooding to constitute a "taking" of property under the Fifth Amendment to the U.S. Constitution, such that compensation could be owed to the owner of the flooded property.

The case was brought by an Arkansas state agency, alleging that federal flood control practices along the Black River had damaged valuable timber on state-owned lands. The commission's lawsuit was supported by advocates for property rights, as well as by fish, forestry and wildlife groups. In opposition, the federal government cited the concern that an adverse ruling could expose it to massive liability for its nationwide flood control efforts.

The Court's decision revitalized the Arkansas agency's lawsuit, which had been reversed on appeal after a $5.7 million judgment had been entered in its favor against the U.S. government. The Supreme Court restricted its holding to the issue of whether temporary flooding was categorically excluded from qualifying as a taking, leaving to the lower appellate court to review the remaining legal issues and merits of the judgment on remand.

== Background of the case ==
[T]he Corps requires a broad ambit of discretion in managing a river over time, and it has to be able to change to update circumstances without exposing the United States to massive liability.

-- Edwin S. Kneedler, Deputy Solicitor General.
Oral Argument, Tr. 52:19-23

The case arose from the management of Clearwater Dam by the United States Army Corps of Engineers. The Corps followed a water control plan under which it released water from the dam at rates depending on the season. Between 1993 and 2000, however, the Corps deviated from this plan at the request of farmers, by releasing water during a period that extended into the timber-growing season of the Dave Donaldson Black River Wildlife Management Area, which is owned and managed by the Arkansas Game and Fish Commission, an Arkansas state agency.

The Commission sued the United States, arguing that the temporary flooding of its Management Area, and consequent damage of valuable timber, constituted a taking of property for which it was entitled to compensation under the Fifth Amendment's Takings Clause. The Court of Federal Claims ruled in favor of the commission and awarded it $5.7 million for the lost timber and the cost of reforesting. The ruling was reversed on appeal by a divided panel of the Federal Circuit, on the basis that there could be no takings claim unless the flooding was "permanent or inevitably recurring."

== The Supreme Court's decision ==
The Court only had the issue before it of whether government-induced temporary flooding was categorically exempt from the scope of the Fifth Amendment's Takings Clause. In a unanimous, eight-justice opinion delivered by Justice Ruth Bader Ginsburg, the Court ruled that there was no basis in its Takings Clause jurisprudence for such an exemption.

We have recognized ... that no magic formula enables a court to judge, in every case, whether a given government interference with property is a taking. In view of the nearly infinite variety of ways in which government actions or regulations can affect property interests, the Court has recognized few invariable rules in this area.

-- 568 U.S. at ___ (slip op., at 6-7).

After reviewing 140 years of takings clause flood cases, the Court focused its attention on rejecting the United States' argument. The Solicitor General relied primarily on a 1924 case where the Court had stated that to establish liability, an overflow must be the direct result of "an actual, permanent invasion of the land." While never going so far as to label the statement dicta, the 2012 Court reasoned that even if the 1924 Court's "passing statement" had established a general limitation, that limitation had been superseded by the temporary takings logic developed in First English Evangelical Lutheran Church of Glendale v. County of Los Angeles, 482 U.S. 304. The Court took care not to express an opinion on a theory first advanced at oral argument that the takings clause only applies to flooding upstream, not downstream; or to consider an amicus argument based on water rights. The Court left to the Federal Circuit on remand to decide if either of those issues was preserved, as well as a host of Government challenges to the Court of Federal Claims' fact-findings.

== Reactions ==
"We're thrilled ... It sends a strong message that this kind of action is compensable under our Constitution, and cannot be treated different from other government intrusions on property. This reopens the door for our agency and state to recoup our losses."

-- James Goodhart, general counsel for the Arkansas Game and Fish Commission.

The Arkansas Game and Fish Commission's position was supported by the National Association of Home Builders, the American Farm Bureau Federation, and the American Forest Resource Council, among others. The Pacific Legal Foundation also hailed the Court's decision as an important victory for property rights.

Carrie Severino, writing for National Review, characterized the decision as "yet another unanimous defeat" for the Obama administration before the Supreme Court, which she wrote had "developed a noted pattern of adopting positions that fail to sway even one justice." Severino attributed this in part to the government's "extreme position", that landowners downstream of a federally managed dam knew the risks of flooding and so should never get compensation, which "went beyond what was logically required to make its point." Lyle Denniston of SCOTUSblog was similarly critical of the government's approach at oral argument, which he derided as the equivalent of "trust us" being offered as a legal standard. Denniston noted that the government's "boldness was something of a jolt to the oral argument ... and left some Justices in wonderment."

== See also ==
- 2012 term opinions of the Supreme Court of the United States
- 2012 term United States Supreme Court opinions of Ruth Bader Ginsburg
