= Kloeckner v. Solis =

- Supreme Court of the United States

Argued October 2, 2012 Decided December 10, 2012
- Full case name: Carolyn M. Kloeckner v. Hilda L. Solis, Secretary of Labor
- Docket no.: 11-184
- Citations: 568 U.S. 41 (more) 133 S. Ct. 596; 184 L. Ed. 2d 433; 2012 U.S. LEXIS 9420; 116 FEP Cases 1153; 81 U.S.L.W. 4018
- Argument: Oral argument

Case history
- Prior: Motion to transfer granted, Kloeckner v. Solis, (D.D.C., May 15, 2009); dismissed, No. 4:09-CV-804, 2010 WL 582590 (E.D. Mo., Feb. 18, 2010); affirmed, 639 F.3d 834 (8th Cir. 2011); cert. granted, 565 U.S. 1152 (2012).

Holding
- A federal employee who claims that an agency action appealable to the Merit Systems Protection Board violates an antidiscrimination statute listed in §7702(a)(1) of the Civil Service Reform Act should seek judicial review in district court, not the Federal Circuit, regardless whether the MSPB decided her case on procedural grounds or on the merits.

Court membership
- Chief Justice John Roberts Associate Justices Antonin Scalia · Anthony Kennedy; Clarence Thomas · Ruth Bader Ginsburg; Stephen Breyer · Samuel Alito; Sonia Sotomayor · Elena Kagan

Case opinion
- Majority: Kagan, joined by unanimous

Laws applied
- 5 U.S.C. § 7702(a)(1) (Civil Service Reform Act of 1978)

Kloeckner v. Solis, 568 U.S. 41 (2012), is a decision by the Supreme Court of the United States involving federal employee grievance procedures under the Civil Service Reform Act of 1978. The issue was whether a so-called "mixed case" involving both wrongful termination and discrimination claims should be appealed from the Merit Systems Protection Board to a federal district court or to the United States Court of Appeals for the Federal Circuit.

The Supreme Court granted certiorari to resolve a circuit split on the issue and ruled unanimously, in an opinion delivered by Justice Elena Kagan, that the statute clearly provided for appeal to a district court in such cases.

== Background of the case ==
In 2006, Carolyn Kloeckner was dismissed from her position in the United States Department of Labor in St. Louis as an employee benefits investigator. Prior to her dismissal, she had filed a complaint with the Equal Employment Opportunity Commission (EEOC) claiming that she had suffered workplace discrimination due to her age and gender. In July 2007, the EEOC terminated proceedings without issuing a judgement and referred it back to the Department of Labor, which affirmed the termination of Kloeckner and claimed she could file an appeal within 30 days to the Merit Systems Protection Board. Kloeckner then filed an appeal with the MSPB, which was created under the Civil Service Reform Act of 1978 to deal with employment decisions of federal agencies, within the 30-day time limit in November 2007. However, the MSPB declared the appeal as untimely and dismissed it on procedural grounds.

== Lower court proceedings ==
Kloeckner then filed a civil complaint in the District Court for the District of Columbia, as her lawyer was from there. The Federal Government then successfully had the venue changed to the federal district court in St. Louis then immediately filed for a dismissal due to lack of jurisdiction. The Civil Service Reform Act directs that cases relating to employee termination are to be heard by the United States Court of Appeals for the Federal Circuit but cases relating to discrimination are referred to a federal district court. Because Kloeckner's case had elements of both, it was classified as a "mixed case" and the federal district court judge noted that there was a circuit split on this issue but judged that jurisdiction to rule on this case was exclusively in the hands of a court of the Eighth Circuit. The Eighth Circuit upheld this ruling on appeal stating that because the MSPB had never resolved the issue of workplace discrimination, only a Federal Circuit Court could rule on the case.

== Opinion of the Court ==
JUSTICE KAGAN: Ms. Harrington, would you agree that this is a remarkably strange way of Congress trying to accomplish this objective? I mean, if Congress were really saying we don't want procedural determinations to go to the district court, that's a very easy thing to say. Congress does not need to ... involve six different cross-references and unnatural reading of statutory language ... It just seems like if Congress wanted what you say it wanted, Congress would not have done it in this extremely complicated and backhanded way.

— Oral Argument Tr. 43:21-44:10

In a unanimous opinion delivered by Justice Elena Kagan, the Court reversed the Eighth Circuit and remanded to the district court. This applies in all cases involving discrimination issues, whether the cases were decided on merit or procedure. The Court criticized the federal government's argument as "construct[ing] such an obscure path to such a simple result", noting that "it would be hard to dream up a more roundabout way of bifurcating judicial review of the MSPB's rulings in mixed cases".

== Reactions ==
Colleen M. Kelley, president of the National Treasury Employees Union, praised the ruling as "provid[ing] a much more clear and rational path" for cases that might otherwise have "ping pong[ed]" through the judicial system, and that the Court's ruling affords discrimination plaintiffs "broader appeal rights."

== See also ==
- 2012 term opinions of the Supreme Court of the United States
- 2012 term United States Supreme Court opinions of Elena Kagan
