= Clearwater Lake (Missouri) =

Reservoir in Missouri, U.S.

- Location within Missouri Location within the United States
- Location: Reynolds and Wayne County, Missouri, U.S.
- Coordinates: 37°08′12″N 90°46′18″W
- Type: Reservoir
- Primary inflows: Black River
- Primary outflows: Black River
- Basin countries: United States
- Surface area: 2.5 sq mi (6.5 km^{2})
- Water volume: 22,000 acre⋅ft (27,000 dam^{3}) (normal); 413,000 acre⋅ft (509,000 dam^{3}) (max)
- Surface elevation: 495 ft (151 m)

Clearwater Lake is a reservoir on the Black River, six miles (9.7 km) from Piedmont, Missouri. The U.S. Army Corps of Engineers uses Clearwater for flood control in the White and lower Mississippi River Basins.

Clearwater Lake was so named on account of its clear, spring-fed water. Construction began in 1940 but was halted temporarily at the advent of World War II. Clearwater Lake Dam opened in 1948 as an earthen and concrete dam, 114 feet (35 m) high. The lake has a surface area of about 2.5 sq mi (6.5 km^{2}).

Though recreation was not part of the lake's initial mission, Clearwater now offers boating, swimming, and camping facilities.

== See also ==
- Arkansas Game and Fish Commission v. United States, 568 U.S. ___ (2012), a decision by the Supreme Court of the United States regarding whether the federal government could be liable for property damage caused by the release of flood waters from Clearwater Dam.
