= Sekhar v. United States =

- Supreme Court of the United States

Argued April 23, 2013 Decided June 26, 2013
- Full case name: Tejas C. Sekhar, petitioner, v. United States
- Docket no.: 12-357
- Citations: 570 U.S. 729 (more) 133 S. Ct. 2720; 186 L. Ed. 2d 794; 2013 U.S. LEXIS 4920, 81 U.S.L.W. 4628
- Opinion announcement: Opinion announcement

Case history
- Prior: Defendant convicted, United States v. Sekhar, 1:10-cr-00573 (N.D.N.Y. 2011); affirmed, 683 F.3d 436 (2nd Cir. 2012); cert. granted, 568 U.S. 1119 (2013).

Holding
- Attempting to compel a person to recommend that his employer approve an investment does not constitute “the obtaining of property from another” under the Hobbs Act.

Court membership
- Chief Justice John Roberts Associate Justices Antonin Scalia · Anthony Kennedy; Clarence Thomas · Ruth Bader Ginsburg; Stephen Breyer · Samuel Alito; Sonia Sotomayor · Elena Kagan

Case opinions
- Majority: Scalia, joined by Roberts, Thomas, Ginsburg, Breyer, Kagan
- Concurrence: Alito (in judgment), joined by Kennedy, Sotomayor

Laws applied
- Hobbs Act (1946)

Sekhar v. United States, 570 U.S. 729 (2013), is a United States Supreme Court decision regarding extortion under the Hobbs Act of 1946.

== Details ==
Giridhar C. Sekhar was a partner at a venture capital firm based in Brookline, Mass. In 2009, Sekhar sent multiple emails to Luke Bierman, who was at the time legal counsel to New York State Comptroller Thomas DiNapoli. According to the emails obtained from Sekhar's home computer by the FBI, Sekhar demanded that Bierman advise the comptroller to commit to a $35 million retirement fund investment at Sekhar's firm, threatening to reveal details of Bierman's alleged extra-marital affair to his wife, DiNapoli, and the media.

After initially being charged with coercion under state law, Sekhar was tried and convicted for attempted extortion under the federal Hobbs act. Sekhar's lawyers contended that the advice of a lawyer employed by the state was not a form of property that could be sought by threats, and hence that the extortion charge was not applicable in this case. The argument was refuted by a federal district court judge and by the Second Circuit court on appeal. Sekhar's lawyers then approached the United States Supreme Court in September 2012.

Justice Antonin Scalia wrote for the majority. The Court held that legal advice could not be considered to be "transferable property" and therefore did not fit the definition of extortion under the Hobbs Act.

== See also ==
- 2012 term United States Supreme Court opinions of Antonin Scalia
