= Maryland v. King =

- Supreme Court of the United States

Argued February 26, 2013 Decided June 3, 2013
- Full case name: Maryland, Petitioner v. Alonzo Jay King, Jr.
- Docket no.: 12-207
- Citations: 569 U.S. 435 (more) 133 S. Ct. 1958; 186 L. Ed. 2d 1
- Argument: Oral argument

Case history
- Prior: King v. State, 422 Md. 353, 30 A.3d 193 (2011); opinion after grant of cert., 425 Md. 550, 42 A.3d 549 (2012); cert. granted, 568 U.S. 1006 (2012).

Holding
- When officers make an arrest supported by probable cause to hold for a serious offense and bring the suspect to the station to be detained in custody, taking and analyzing a cheek swab of the arrestee's DNA is, like fingerprinting and photographing, a legitimate police booking procedure that is reasonable under the Fourth Amendment.

Court membership
- Chief Justice John Roberts Associate Justices Antonin Scalia · Anthony Kennedy; Clarence Thomas · Ruth Bader Ginsburg; Stephen Breyer · Samuel Alito; Sonia Sotomayor · Elena Kagan

Case opinions
- Majority: Kennedy, joined by Roberts, Thomas, Breyer, Alito
- Dissent: Scalia, joined by Ginsburg, Sotomayor, Kagan

Laws applied
- U.S. Const. amend. IV

Maryland v. King, 569 U.S. 435 (2013), was a decision of the Supreme Court of the United States that held that a buccal swab to harvest an arrestee's DNA is comparable to fingerprinting and, therefore, a legal police booking procedure that is reasonable under the Fourth Amendment.

The majority balanced state interests relating to detaining and charging arrestees against the affected individuals' interests in their bodily integrity and informational privacy. The majority concluded that it is constitutionally reasonable for the state to undertake the "negligible" physical intrusion of swabbing the inside of the legitimately detained arrestee's cheeks and using limited data from the DNA to determine whether the individual might be associated with a crime scene or victim.

== Background and procedural posture ==
Alonzo Jay King Jr. was arrested for first- and second-degree assault. As according to Maryland police protocol codified in the Maryland DNA Collection Act, a DNA sample was taken from King at the time of the arrest and entered into Maryland's DNA database. It was matched to an unsolved rape case from 2003.

A Wicomico County grand jury called for an indictment, and a warrant was obtained to obtain a second buccal DNA sample that could be used as incriminating evidence for the rape case.

King filed a motion to suppress the DNA evidence, stating that it infringed upon his Fourth Amendment rights, which prohibit unreasonable searches and seizures, in the county's circuit court. His motion was denied, and King pleaded not guilty to the charge of rape and appealed the ruling. The Maryland Court of Appeals reversed the original ruling, agreeing that the DNA sampling was a violation of the Fourth Amendment and could not be used as evidence.

The state of Maryland appealed the ruling and called for the case to be reviewed by the Supreme Court of the United States. The Supreme Court denied a stay in this case in 2012. The case was heard before the Supreme Court in February 2013, and a decision was released in June 2013.

== Decision and dissenting opinion ==
The Court ruled 5-4 in favor of Maryland. The majority opinion, written by Justice Anthony Kennedy, described Maryland's law as follows:

The Act authorizes Maryland law enforcement authorities to collect DNA samples from "an individual who is charged with... a crime of violence or an attempt to commit a crime of violence; or... burglary or an attempt to commit burglary."

Maryland law defines a crime of violence to include murder, rape, first-degree assault, kidnaping, arson, sexual assault, and a variety of other serious crimes. Once taken, a DNA sample may not be processed or placed in a database before the individual is arraigned (unless the individual consents). It is then that a judicial officer ensures that there is probable cause to detain the arrestee on a qualifying serious offense.

If "all qualifying criminal charges are determined to be unsupported by probable cause... the DNA sample shall be immediately destroyed." DNA samples are also destroyed if "a criminal action begun against the individual... does not result in a conviction,... the conviction is finally reversed or vacated and no new trial is permitted "or "the individual is granted an unconditional pardon."

Justice Antonin Scalia, joined by justices Ruth Bader Ginsburg, Sonia Sotomayor and Elena Kagan, filed a scathing dissenting opinion. The justices maintained that "categorically" and "without exception," "The Fourth Amendment forbids searching a person for evidence of a crime when there is no basis for believing the person is guilty of the crime or is in possession of incriminating evidence." The dissent also warned that, "[a]s an entirely predictable consequence of today's decision, your DNA can be taken and entered into a national DNA database if you are ever arrested, rightly or wrongly, and for whatever reason."

Justice Scalia took the rare step of reading his dissent from the bench, "signaling deep disagreement" on the Court.

== Genetic and law-enforcement technology ==
Maryland's DNA database laws were first enacted in 1994 and continued to be expanded until 2002. For all felony and some misdemeanor arrests, the arrestee's DNA is submitted into a State DNA Index Systems (SDIS) database. The DNA is collected using a buccal swab, which is a brush inside of the cheek. The DNA from the cheek cells in the swab is replicated, given a restriction enzyme digest and electrophoresed.

Electrophoresis separates DNA segments by their size, and different people have unique sizes of segments of DNA because of variations in the DNA sequence. The sequence modification allows governments to identify the alleles, versions of some loci or gene, of a person in the DNA. The collection of genetic markers allows for high-precision identification of a suspected criminal from the DNA samples found at crime scenes or on victims.

The genetic markers from an arrestee are searched against all other felons and arrestees in the database when police are attempting to compile evidence by the use of blood, saliva, skin or other bodily fluids.

== Implications ==
Maryland v. King presented competing issues regarding social ethics and the law. The case dealt with the issue of consent, because King did not provide consent to perform the buccal swab.

King and his lawyers argued that even a rapist is still a rightful citizen of society who deserves equal protection according to the Constitution. The Fourth Amendment declares that no person shall be subject to an unreasonable search or seizure, which may be construed as to include DNA tests. King argued that his DNA analysis was unlawful and could not be used as evidence. However, after a successful appeal from Maryland, the charge was reinstated.

The extent to which the case is a move toward replacing the rule that warrants must be based on probable cause, normally required with a general standard of reasonableness in Fourth Amendment jurisprudence, has been debated.

In later cases, the Court has continued to maintain that a warrant is required unless a well-defined categorical exception to the warrant requirement applies or the search is of the "special needs," "administrative" or "regulatory" variety (such as random drug testing of student athletes) with the primary purpose other than the production of evidence for the investigation or prosecution of a crime. King thus remains one of only a handful of cases that stands outside this framework.

For the state of Maryland to be able to rightfully obtain and use the buccal sample from the defendant, King must first be arrested for a violent or serious crime. Then, an indictment for a court order would be placed to obtain a second DNA sample to use for the rape case. If he was not convicted, his DNA would have been destroyed.

At issue was the question of the degree to which the warrantless extraction of DNA samples comported with usual police procedural protocols following an arrest, such as recording of imprints of the arrestee's fingerprints, and whether the procedure was a necessary measure to determine potential risk to the community, the victim or the arrestee. The Supreme Court ruled in favor of Maryland, finding that there is no real difference between "the practice of how DNA samples are used, and fingerprints, other than the unparalleled accuracy DNA provides." The Court ruled is that the warrantless buccal-swab procedure is not a violation of the Fourth Amendment in that the extraction of such samples is part of the usual protocol followed when processing an arrestee at a police station.

== Briefs ==
Defendant Alonzo Jay King Jr. argued that, at the time of the arrest, the police possessed no reasonable suspicion that he was linked to any crimes other than that for which he had been arrested. Citing Fourth Amendment concerns, King argued that DNA testing is not analogous to fingerprinting but an invasion of privacy that infringed upon citizens' "right to secure their persons, houses, papers, and effects." King reasoned that arrestees maintain reasonable expectations of privacy until conviction and that the privacy and due process interests outweigh the government's interests.

The state argued that the Maryland DNA Collection Act served as a well-established, legitimate booking procedure for all people indicted on charges of violence or burglary, and that the act and the Maryland state DNA database were established to keep communities safe. The state's brief stressed that a buccal swab is a painless, non-invasive medical procedure that yields a sampling of the arrestee's DNA that is restricted only to the markers needed for the DNA database and does include significant genetic information. The state noted that arrestees may request the destruction of their DNA data upon exoneration or dropped charges and that King did not request the removal of his DNA from the system until after his DNA had been matched with that collected in the investigation of the rape crime.

== Criticism and support ==
Critics of the ruling argue that the potential benefits of identifying perpetrators of cold cases and the possibility of freeing those wrongly convicted do not outweigh the relevant privacy concerns. Those in favor of the ruling see the case as an important weapon in fighting future crimes.
