= Maracich v. Spears =

- Supreme Court of the United States

Decided June 17, 2013
- Full case name: Maracich v. Spears
- Docket no.: 12-25
- Citations: 570 U.S. ___ (more)

Holding
- An attorney's solicitation of clients is not a permissible purpose covered by the "litigation exception" to the federal Driver's Privacy Protection Act.

Court membership
- Chief Justice John Roberts Associate Justices Antonin Scalia · Anthony Kennedy; Clarence Thomas · Ruth Bader Ginsburg; Stephen Breyer · Samuel Alito; Sonia Sotomayor · Elena Kagan

Case opinions
- Majority: Kennedy, joined by Roberts, Thomas, Breyer, Alito
- Dissent: Ginsburg, joined by Scalia, Sotomayor, Kagan

Laws applied
- Driver's Privacy Protection Act

Maracich v. Spears, 570 U.S. ___ (2013), was a United States Supreme Court case in which the Court held that an attorney's solicitation of clients is not a permissible purpose covered by the "litigation exception" to the federal Driver's Privacy Protection Act.
