= Scope of review =

The scope of review refers generally to the right to have an issue raised on appeal. It entails whether an issue was preserved by or available to an appellant on appeal. The scope of review is to the appellate court what the burden of proof is to the trial court. For example, in the United States, a party ,ay preserve an issue for appeal by raising an objection at trial.

The scope of review further relates to matters such as which judicial acts the appellate court may examine and what remedies it may apply.

The scope of review for administrative law evolved substantially in the 1970s and the 1980s.

== See also ==
- Standard of review
