= US Airways, Inc. v. McCutchen =

- Supreme Court of the United States

Decided April 16, 2013
- Full case name: US Airways, Inc. v. McCutchen
- Citations: 569 U.S. 88 (more)

Holding
- When someone seeks equitable relief to enforce an ERISA plan, the terms of the plans govern but equitable doctrines can fill gaps in the terms.

Court membership
- Chief Justice John Roberts Associate Justices Antonin Scalia · Anthony Kennedy; Clarence Thomas · Ruth Bader Ginsburg; Stephen Breyer · Samuel Alito; Sonia Sotomayor · Elena Kagan

Case opinions
- Majority: Kagan
- Dissent: Scalia, joined by Roberts, Thomas, Alito

US Airways, Inc. v. McCutchen, 569 U.S. 88 (2013), was a United States Supreme Court case in which the court held that when someone seeks equitable relief to enforce an ERISA plan, the terms of the plans govern but equitable doctrines can fill gaps in the terms.

== Background ==
The health benefits plan established by US Airways paid $66,866 in medical expenses for injuries suffered by McCutchen, a US Airways employee, in a car accident caused by a third party. The plan entitled US Airways to reimbursement if McCutchen later recovered money from the third party. McCutchen's attorneys secured $110,000 in payments, and McCutchen received $66,000 after deducting the lawyers' 40% contingency fee. US Airways demanded reimbursement of the full $66,866 it had paid. When McCutchen did not comply, US Airways filed suit under §502(a)(3) of the Employee Retirement Income Security Act of 1974 (ERISA), which authorizes health-plan administrators to bring a civil action "to obtain... appropriate equitable relief... to enforce... the terms of the plan." McCutchen raised two defenses to US Airways's request for an equitable lien on the $66,866 it demanded: that, absent over-recovery on his part, US Airways's right to reimbursement did not kick in; and that US Airways had to contribute its fair share to the costs he incurred to get his recovery, so any reimbursement had to be reduced by 40%, to cover the contingency fee. Rejecting both arguments, the federal District Court granted summary judgment to US Airways.

The Third Circuit Court of Appeals vacated. Reasoning that traditional "equitable doctrines and defenses" applied to §502(a)(3) suits, it held that the principle of unjust enrichment overrode US Airways' reimbursement clause because the clause would leave McCutchen with less than full payment for his medical bills and would give US Airways a windfall.

== Opinion of the court ==
The Supreme Court issued an opinion on April 16, 2013.
