= United States v. Davila =

- Supreme Court of the United States

Argued April 15, 2013 Decided June 13, 2013
- Full case name: United States, Petitioner v. Anthony Davila
- Docket no.: 12-167
- Citations: 569 U.S. 597 (more) 133 S. Ct. 2139; 186 L. Ed. 2d 139; 2013 U.S. LEXIS 4541; 81 U.S.L.W. 4394
- Argument: Oral argument

Case history
- Prior: 664 F.3d 1355 (11th Cir. 2011)

Holding
- When a federal judge participates in the plea process in violation of Rule 11(c) of the Federal Rules of Criminal Procedure, a guilty plea need not be vacated if the record shows prejudice to the decision to plea due to Rule 11(h).

Court membership
- Chief Justice John Roberts Associate Justices Antonin Scalia · Anthony Kennedy; Clarence Thomas · Ruth Bader Ginsburg; Stephen Breyer · Samuel Alito; Sonia Sotomayor · Elena Kagan

Case opinions
- Majority: Ginsburg, joined by Roberts, Kennedy, Breyer, Alito, Sotomayor, Kagan
- Concurrence: Scalia, joined by Thomas

United States v. Davila, 569 U.S. 597 (2013), was a United States Supreme Court case in which the Court held that, when a federal judge participates in the plea process in violation of Rule 11(c) of the Federal Rules of Criminal Procedure, a guilty plea need not be vacated if the record shows prejudice to the decision to plea due to Rule 11(h).
