= Moncrieffe v. Holder =

- Supreme Court of the United States

Argued October 10, 2012 Decided April 23, 2013
- Full case name: Adrian Moncrieffe, petitioner, v. Eric H. Holder Jr., Attorney General
- Docket no.: 11-702
- Citations: 569 U.S. 184 (more) 133 S. Ct. 1678; 185 L. Ed. 2d 727; 2013 U.S. LEXIS 3313; 81 U.S.L.W. 4265

Case history
- Prior: 662 F.3d 387 (5th Cir. 2011); cert. granted, 566 U.S. 920 (2012).

Holding
- If a noncitizen’s conviction for a marijuana distribution offense fails to establish that the offense involved either remuneration or more than a small amount of marijuana, it is not an aggravated felony under the Immigration and Nationality Act.

Court membership
- Chief Justice John Roberts Associate Justices Antonin Scalia · Anthony Kennedy; Clarence Thomas · Ruth Bader Ginsburg; Stephen Breyer · Samuel Alito; Sonia Sotomayor · Elena Kagan

Case opinions
- Majority: Sotomayor, joined by Roberts, Scalia, Kennedy, Ginsburg, Breyer, Kagan
- Dissent: Thomas
- Dissent: Alito

Laws applied
- Immigration and Nationality Act (1952); Controlled Substances Act

Moncrieffe v. Holder, 569 U.S. 184 (2013), is a United States Supreme Court decision in which the court ruled in a 7–2 decision that "social sharing of a small amount of marijuana" by a legal immigrant does not constitute aggravated felony and so does not require mandatory deportation.

== Background ==
Adrian Moncrieffe is a Jamaican national who has lived in the United States since he moved there in 1984 at the age of three. In 2008 he was stopped by police in Georgia for a traffic violation when they found 1.3 grams of marijuana in his car. Moncrieffe pleaded guilty to the charge of marijuana possession with intent to distribute and agreed to a deal with no jail time. Two years later, immigration officials discovered the arrest and decided to detain and finally deport him, as drug trafficking charge is treated as an aggravated felony under immigration policies. After Moncrieffe lost his challenge in an administrative case, he was deported back to Jamaica.

Georgia's marijuana law, like in most other states, defines possession with intent to distribute marijuana for no remuneration and distributing a small amount of marijuana charge under the same statute, which made his case. Under federal marijuana law, the prior charge is treated as a possession case if it involves a small amount of marijuana, which cleared Moncrieffe from having committing an aggravated felony of drug trafficking under immigration law.

The Fifth Circuit Court upheld the deportation order, ruling that as the prosecution was not required to prove the amount of marijuana involved, the conviction amounted to a felony under federal law. The Supreme Court granted writ of certiorari to clear up confusion in the lower courts. The federal government argued that as the distinction based on the amount of marijuana possessed was a sentencing and not a conviction issue and so did not affect the deportation order.

== Decision ==
Associate Justice Sonia Sotomayor, writing for the majority, agreed with Moncrieffe's lawyers that he was still eligible for the exception for possession of small amounts of marijuana under federal law. He would thus be able to appeal his deportation with immigration officials.

== See also ==
- 2012 term United States Supreme Court opinions of Sonia Sotomayor
