= McQuiggin v. Perkins =

- Supreme Court of the United States

Argued February 25, 2013 Decided May 28, 2013
- Full case name: Greg McQuiggin, Warden, Petitioner v. Floyd Perkins
- Docket no.: 12–126
- Citations: 569 U.S. 383 (more) 133 S. Ct. 1924; 185 L. Ed. 2d 1019; 2013 U.S. LEXIS 4068
- Opinion announcement: Opinion announcement

Case history
- Prior: Perkins v. McQuiggin, No. 2:08-cv-139 (W.D. Mich. June 18, 2009); 670 F.3d 665 (6th Cir. 2012); cert. granted, 568 U.S. 977 (2012).

Holding
- Actual innocence, if proved, serves as a gateway through which a petitioner may pass whether the impediment is a procedural bar or the expiration of the AEDPA statute of limitations.

Court membership
- Chief Justice John Roberts Associate Justices Antonin Scalia · Anthony Kennedy; Clarence Thomas · Ruth Bader Ginsburg; Stephen Breyer · Samuel Alito; Sonia Sotomayor · Elena Kagan

Case opinions
- Majority: Ginsburg, joined by Kennedy, Breyer, Sotomayor, Kagan
- Dissent: Scalia, joined by Roberts, Thomas; Alito (Parts I, II, and III)

Laws applied
- Antiterrorism and Effective Death Penalty Act of 1996

McQuiggin v. Perkins, 569 U.S. 383 (2013), was a United States Supreme Court case in which the Court held that judges may review new evidence of actual innocence presented after AEDPA's one-year statute of limitations. This exception is called the "innocence gateway".

The Antiterrorism and Effective Death Penalty Act of 1996 (AEDPA) gives a state prisoner one year to file a federal habeas petition, starting from "the date on which the judgment became final." 28 U.S.C. § 2244. But if the petition alleges newly discovered evidence, the filing deadline is one year from "the date on which the factual predicate of the claim ... could have been discovered through ... due diligence." 28 U.S.C. § 2244. The innocence gateway is an exception to the one year due diligence requirement for petitioners who have new evidence proving their innocence.

Justice Ruth Bader Ginsburg writing for the majority warned that AEDPA's high bar still required judges to find that "it is more likely than not that no reasonable juror would have convicted...in light of the new evidence". Emily Bazelon said this high bar means "in effect...to figure out if people like Perkins are entitled to a hearing about whether they have strong evidence of innocence, judges will have to first hold a hearing to figure out whether there is strong evidence of innocence".

== Background ==
On March 4, 1993, Floyd Perkins, Damarr Jones, and Rodney Henderson attended a party in Flint, Michigan. The three men left the party together. Henderson was later found murdered. Perkins and Jones accused each other for the murder. Perkins testified that he became separated from Jones and Henderson, but later saw Jones with blood on his clothing. Jones testified that he watched Perkins kill Henderson. Two witnesses testified that Perkins confessed to killing Henderson. Perkins was eventually charged with the murder, convicted by a jury, and sentenced to life in prison without the possibility of parole. Perkins lost his direct appeals and his conviction became final on May 5, 1997.

From 1997 to 2003, Perkins obtained three affidavits which he claimed would prove his innocence; however, he did not file a habeas corpus appeal until 2008. Under the Antiterrorism and Effective Death Penalty Act of 1996 (AEDPA), a state prisoner has one year to file a federal petition for habeas corpus from the date on which the new evidence became available. The District Court denied Perkins' habeas appeal because he had filed the appeal after AEDPA's one year statute of limitations. The District Court also determined that Perkins' new evidence was insufficient to prove his actual innocence. Perkins appealed to the Sixth Circuit Court of Appeals where the District Court's judgment was reversed. The Sixth Circuit held that a person claiming actual innocence is excused from AEDPA's one year statute of limitations. The Supreme Court agreed to hear this case to determine whether actual innocence is an acceptable excuse to bypass AEDPA's one-year statute of limitations.

== Decision ==
The case was argued before the Supreme Court on February 25, 2013, and the opinion was published on May 28, 2013. Chad Readler argued for Perkins. The Court decided in a 5–4 decision that actual innocence, if proven, is sufficient to circumvent AEDPA's statute of limitations. AEDPA was enacted by Congress to preserve judicial resources by restricting the qualifications of habeas petitions; however, it was the opinion of the Court that Congress did not intend to enact a deadline on the rare cases where federal constitutional errors resulted in the conviction and incarceration of persons who are actually innocent.

Justice Ruth Bader Ginsburg, writing for the majority, cautioned that a delay in filing a habeas petition could be a factor in deciding whether actual innocence has been reliably shown. For example, a petitioner waits to file his habeas appeal and during this time a key witness passes away. In this example, a court may view the delay as deliberate in order to take advantage of the witness' death and therefore deny the petitioner's actual innocence claim.

Although Perkins won his argument that actual innocence is an acceptable reason to excuse AEDPA's statute of limitations, he lost in his claim of actual innocence. The Court believed the District Court had acted properly by considering and rejecting Perkins actual innocence claims and thus remanded the case back to the Sixth Circuit. In doing so, the Court held that a District Court should first focus on the merits of a petitioner's actual innocence claims before considering a procedural bar, such as AEDPA's statute of limitations.

== Dissent ==
Justice Antonin Scalia, writing the dissent, indicated that it was Congress' intent to apply the AEDPA's statute of limitations to all cases, including those where a petitioner claims actual innocence. He argued that the Court does not have the power to override a constitutionally valid statute from Congress. As a result of this case, "each time an untimely petitioner claims innocence ... the district court will be obligated to expend limited judicial resources wading into the murky merits of the petitioner's innocence claim".

== See also ==
- List of United States Supreme Court cases, volume 569
- List of United States Supreme Court cases
- Lists of United States Supreme Court cases by volume
