= Genesis Healthcare Corp. v. Symczyk =

Genesis HealthCare Corp. v. Symczyk
- Supreme Court of the United States

Argued December 3, 2012 Decided April 16, 2013
- Full case name: Genesis HealthCare Corp. v. Symczyk
- Docket no.: 11-1059
- Citations: 569 U.S. 66 (more) 133 S. Ct. 1523; 185 L. Ed. 2d 636; 2013 U.S. LEXIS 3157; 81 U.S.L.W. 4229
- Opinion announcement: Opinion announcement

Case history
- Prior: 656 F.3d 189 (3d Cir. 2011); cert. granted, 567 U.S. 933 (2012).

Holding
- Because respondent had no personal interest in representing putative, unnamed claimants, nor any other continuing interest that would preserve her suit from mootness, her suit was appropriately dismissed for lack of subject-matter jurisdiction.

Court membership
- Chief Justice John Roberts Associate Justices Antonin Scalia · Anthony Kennedy; Clarence Thomas · Ruth Bader Ginsburg; Stephen Breyer · Samuel Alito; Sonia Sotomayor · Elena Kagan

Case opinions
- Majority: Thomas, joined by Roberts, Scalia, Kennedy, Alito
- Dissent: Kagan, joined by Ginsburg, Breyer, Sotomayor

Laws applied
- Article III, Sec. 2; Fair Labor Standards Act of 1938

Genesis HealthCare Corp. v. Symczyk, 569 U.S. 66 (2013), was a decision by the United States Supreme Court in which the court held that, because the respondent had no personal interest in representing putative, unnamed claimants nor any other continuing interest that would preserve her suit from mootness, her suit was appropriately dismissed for lack of subject-matter jurisdiction.

== Background ==
The Fair Labor Standards Act of 1938 (FLSA) provides that all employees have the right to full pay for forty hours of work in any given week. Laura Symczyk, a nurse working for Genesis HealthCare, alleged that her employer would regularly dock thirty minutes of pay per shift for its employees as meal time, regardless of whether the employee actually took a meal break. Under the FLSA, an aggrieved employee can sue not only on her own behalf, but on behalf of all co-workers who have similarly been injured. This is called a "collective action," which is roughly (but not completely) similar to a class action.

Symczyk filed a collective action suit under the FLSA, and her employer thereafter offered her $7,500 in unpaid wages plus attorneys fees and other costs and expenses, which would have fully satisfied her individual claim. After she failed to respond to the offer, Genesis moved to dismiss the suit, arguing that through her failure to accept satisfaction, in full, of her claim for relief, she no longer had any interest in the litigation. Symczyk argued that her employer was simply attempting a "pick off" - by satisfying her claim, Genesis could avoid facing the collective action suit on behalf of the other employees. The district court found that because no other employees had joined the collective action and because Symczyk had been offered full relief, her claim was moot. The United States Court of Appeals for the Third Circuit agreed that Symczyk's personal claim was moot, but authorized her to proceed with the collective action.

== Decision ==
In a 5–4 decision, the Supreme Court held that the entire action must be dismissed based on an assumption of mootness. The majority did not actually settle the mootness issue, claiming that the issue was not properly before the Court because Symczyk failed to file her own appeal on the point and had waived the issue in the proceedings below. The majority held that a collective action suit cannot survive once the individual claim is satisfied without other workers coming forward to take part. Because Symczyk failed to contest that the offer from Genesis mooted the claim, and because no other workers had joined the collective action, the entire action was moot.

The dissent emphasized that this case is largely meaningless in the grand scheme of things because this situation would likely never recur in another case. The dissent attacked the majority's assumption that the offer of satisfaction mooted the claim, and the dissenters further argued that when such an offer is simply unaccepted (as was the case here) the case can continue to move forward.
