= Trevino v. Thaler =

- Supreme Court of the United States

Argued February 25, 2013 Decided May 28, 2013
- Full case name: Trevino v. Thaler
- Docket no.: 11-10189
- Citations: 569 U.S. 413 (more) 133 S. Ct. 1911

Holding
- Expanded narrow exception to Coleman v. Thompson created by Martinez v. Ryan to state procedural schemes that deny criminal defendants a "meaningful opportunity" to raise an ineffective assistance of counsel claim on direct appeal.

Court membership
- Chief Justice John Roberts Associate Justices Antonin Scalia · Anthony Kennedy; Clarence Thomas · Ruth Bader Ginsburg; Stephen Breyer · Samuel Alito; Sonia Sotomayor · Elena Kagan

Case opinions
- Majority: Breyer, joined by Kennedy, Ginsburg, Sotomayor, Kagan
- Dissent: Roberts, joined by Alito
- Dissent: Scalia, joined by Thomas

Trevino v. Thaler, 569 US 413, was a 2013 United States Supreme Court decision that applied the narrow exception to Coleman v. Thompson's rule recognized by Martinez v. Ryan to excuse ineffective assistance of counsel (IAC) claims that were procedurally defaulted under Texas state law. Martinez recognized a right to counsel in an initial-review collateral proceeding where state law did not allow ineffective assistance of counsel (IAC) claims to be raised until post-conviction proceedings because there is no constitutional right to counsel in post-conviction proceedings. Even though Texas law allowed IAC claims to be raised on direct appeal the Court found that the state's procedures did not afford a "meaningful opportunity" to do so and held that the IAC claims raised for the first time in a federal habeas petition were not barred by the procedural default.

== Background ==
Carlos Trevino was sentenced to death for the rape and fatal stabbing of 15 year old Linda Salinas in San Antonio on June 9, 1996. Trevino was 21 years old at the time. He had recently been released from prison after a conviction for auto theft.

== Supreme Court ==
=== Majority opinion ===
The majority decision emphasized the interest in the fairness of state processes and the availability of federal review for prisoners who did not have a "meaningful opportunity" to litigate an IAC claim.

The Court said prisoners could raise their ineffective assistance of counsel claim for the first time in a federal habeas petition because the state procedure in Texas, while allowing the IAC claim to be raised on direct appeal as a formality, did not allow a "meaningful opportunity" to raise an IAC claim during state proceedings.

=== Dissent ===
Dissenting, Chief Justice John Roberts said the Court had been "unusually explicit about the narrowness" of the Martinez decision.

=== Subsequent developments ===
The Supreme Court remanded six capital sentences back to Texas courts for reconsideration after Trevino.

On remand, Trevino's attorneys argued that the jury might have imposed a life sentence if evidence of fetal alcohol syndrome had been presented during the trial's penalty phase. The 5th Circuit Court of Appeals ruled against Trevino's ineffective assistance claim. Justice Ruth Bader Ginsburg joined Sonia Sotomayor in dissent.
