= Comcast Corp. v. Behrend =

- Supreme Court of the United States

Argued November 5, 2012 Decided March 27, 2013
- Full case name: Comcast Corporation, et al., Petitioners v. Caroline Behrend, et al.
- Docket no.: 11-864
- Citations: 569 U.S. 27 (more) 133 S. Ct. 1426; 185 L. Ed. 2d 515; 2013 U.S. LEXIS 2544, 81 U.S.L.W. 4217
- Opinion announcement: Opinion announcement

Case history
- Prior: Decision against defendant, 264 F.R.D. 150 (E.D. Pa. 2010); affirmed, 655 F.3d 182 (3d Cir. 2011); rehearing en banc denied, unreported; certiorari granted, 567 U.S. 933 (2012).

Holding
- Courts certifying classes must thoroughly vet prospective classes for all four requirements even if the court's analysis touches on the merits of the claim.

Court membership
- Chief Justice John Roberts Associate Justices Antonin Scalia · Anthony Kennedy; Clarence Thomas · Ruth Bader Ginsburg; Stephen Breyer · Samuel Alito; Sonia Sotomayor · Elena Kagan

Case opinions
- Majority: Scalia, joined by Roberts, Kennedy, Thomas, Alito
- Dissent: Ginsburg and Breyer, joined by Sotomayor, Kagan

Laws applied
- Federal Rule of Civil Procedure 23(b)(3)

Comcast Corp. v. Behrend, 569 U.S. 27 (2013), is a United States Supreme Court case in which the court held that courts certifying classes must thoroughly vet prospective classes for all four requirements even if the court's analysis touches on the merits of the claim. The case restricted class certifications. The votes were split upon typical ideological lines, but, in an unusual move, the dissent was jointly written by two justices.
