= Salinas v. Texas =

2013 landmark decision of the U.S. Supreme Court

- Supreme Court of the United States

Argued April 17, 2013 Decided June 17, 2013
- Full case name: Genovivo Salinas v. State of Texas
- Docket no.: 12-246
- Citations: 570 U.S. 178 (more) 133 S.Ct. 2174, 2180, 186 L.Ed. 376, 2013 U.S. LEXIS 4697 (2013)
- Argument: Oral argument
- Opinion announcement: Opinion announcement

Case history
- Prior: Judgement for the defendant, 368 S.W. 3d 550, 557–559 (2011); Texas Court of Criminal Appeals

Questions presented
- Does the Fifth Amendment's Self-Incrimination Clause protect A defendant's refusal to answer questions asked by law enforcement before he has been arrested or read his Miranda rights?

Holding
- The Fifth Amendment's privilege against self-incrimination does not extend to defendants who simply decide to remain mute during questioning. Texas Court of Criminal Appeals affirmed.

Court membership
- Chief Justice John Roberts Associate Justices Antonin Scalia · Anthony Kennedy; Clarence Thomas · Ruth Bader Ginsburg; Stephen Breyer · Samuel Alito; Sonia Sotomayor · Elena Kagan

Case opinions
- Plurality: Alito, joined by Roberts, Kennedy
- Concurrence: Thomas (in judgment), joined by Scalia
- Dissent: Breyer, joined by Ginsburg, Sotomayor, Kagan

Laws applied
- U.S. Const. amends. V

Salinas v. Texas, 570 US 178 (2013), is a landmark decision of the Supreme Court of the United States, in which the court held, in a 5–4 decision, that the Fifth Amendment's self-incrimination clause does not extend to defendants who simply choose to remain silent during questioning, even though no arrest has been made nor the Miranda rights read to a defendant.

== Background ==
In 1992, in Houston, Texas, Houston police officers found two homicide victims. The investigation led officers to Genovivo Salinas. Even though he was not arrested at that time and the police had not read him his Miranda rights, Salinas agreed to accompany the police officers to the police station. During the interrogation, Salinas answered every question the police officers asked him, until asked whether the shotgun shells found at the scene would match the gun found at Salinas's home. According to the police officer, Salinas did not answer this question, and demonstrated signs of deception. A ballistics analysis later revealed that the gun found at the scene matched Salinas's gun with the casings. A witness said Salinas had admitted to the killings.

Salinas was charged with the murders in 1993, but could not be found until 15 years later, when he was captured in Mexico. His first trial ended in a mistrial. In a second trial, Salinas did not take the stand, and the prosecutor commented to the jury on Salinas's silence and physical reaction during questioning as evidence of his guilt, over his objection on the grounds of the Fifth Amendment's protection against self-incrimination. Salinas was found guilty of the murders, sentenced to 20 years in prison, and fined $5,000. On appeal, his Fifth Amendment argument was rejected by the Fourteenth Court of Appeals of Harris County and the Texas Court of Criminal Appeals. Salinas then appealed to the Supreme Court of the United States, which granted certiorari.

== Supreme Court ==
The question presented was whether the Fifth Amendment's self-incrimination clause protects a defendant's refusal to answer questions asked by law enforcement, even before he has been arrested or read his Miranda rights. The case was argued April 17, 2013, and on June 17, 2013, the Court issued a divided judgment upholding Salinas' conviction. Justice Samuel Alito wrote for a plurality: himself, Chief Justice John Roberts, and Justice Anthony Kennedy. Justice Clarence Thomas (joined by Justice Antonin Scalia) concurred in the judgment, and the Court's four Democratic appointees dissented. Alito wrote that the Salinas' Fifth Amendment claim failed because he did not expressly invoke the privilege in response to the officer's question, and no Constitutional violation occurs provided police do not deprive defendants of the opportunity to claim Fifth Amendment privilege. He wrote that explicit invocation is necessary to put the government "on notice" so that it can respond to a defendant's claim that the sought testimony could be self-incriminating. The case thus places an important limitation on defendants' right to remain silent during questioning and at trial.

In his concurrence, Justice Thomas wrote that he would have gone further and held that, even if Salinas had invoked the Fifth Amendment, it would not have barred the evidence, because he had not been compelled to give self-incriminating testimony.

The dissent, by Justice Stephen Breyer, argued that Salinas' silence had been an exercise of the Fifth Amendment, and that the Court was incorrect to require defendants' awareness of the "linguistic detail" of expressly invoking it.

== See also ==
- Griffin v. California
- Florida v. Powell
- Right to silence
