= Vance v. Ball State University =

- Supreme Court of the United States

Argued November 26, 2012 Decided June 24, 2013
- Full case name: Vance v. Ball State University
- Docket no.: 11-556
- Citations: 570 U.S. 421 (more) 133 S. Ct. 2434; 186 L. Ed. 2d 565; 2013 U.S. LEXIS 4703; 81 U.S.L.W. 4553

Case history
- Prior: United States Court of Appeals for the Seventh Circuit

Holding
- An employee is a "supervisor" for purposes of vicarious liability under Title VII only if he or she is empowered by the employer to take tangible employment actions against the victim.

Court membership
- Chief Justice John Roberts Associate Justices Antonin Scalia · Anthony Kennedy; Clarence Thomas · Ruth Bader Ginsburg; Stephen Breyer · Samuel Alito; Sonia Sotomayor · Elena Kagan

Case opinions
- Majority: Alito, joined by Roberts, Scalia, Kennedy, Thomas
- Concurrence: Thomas
- Dissent: Ginsburg, joined by Breyer, Sotomayor, Kagan

Laws applied
- Title VII

Vance v. Ball State University, 570 U.S. 421 (2013), is a U.S. Supreme Court case regarding who is a "supervisor" for the purposes of harassment lawsuits. The Supreme Court upheld the Seventh Circuit's decision in a 5–4 opinion written by Samuel Alito, rejecting the Equal Employment Opportunity Commission's interpretation of who counts as a supervisor. The case was important because it resolved a dispute between several different circuits.

The issue presented before the Court was:

Whether, as the Second, Fourth, and Ninth Circuits have held, the Faragher and Ellerth "supervisor" liability rule (i) applies to harassment by those whom the employer vests with authority to direct and oversee their victim's daily work, or, as the First, Seventh, and Eighth Circuits have held (ii) is limited to those harassers who have the power to "hire, fire, demote, promote, transfer, or discipline" their victim.

— Questions presented, Vance v. Ball State University

== Background ==
While working at Ball State University, Maetta Vance contended that Saundra Davis, a catering specialist, had made Vance's life at work unpleasant through physical acts and racial harassment. Vance sued her employer, the university, for workplace harassment by a supervisor.

To win a lawsuit for harassment under Title VII of the Civil Rights Act of 1964, it is necessary to show that the employer is negligent in responding to complaints about harassment. However, to win a lawsuit for harassment by a supervisor, the employer does not have to be negligent because Title VII imputes the supervisor's acts to the employer. Vance asserted that Davis was a supervisor; Ball State claimed the opposite.

The District Court and the Seventh Circuit Court of Appeals had determined that Davis was not Vance's supervisor, because Davis did not have the power to direct the terms and conditions of her employment.

== Supreme Court decision ==
The Court upheld the Seventh Circuit's interpretation in its decision issued on June 24, 2013. It used a narrow interpretation of the term "supervisor", so that a person may only be considered a supervisor if he or she can take tangible action against the employee.

== See also ==
- List of United States Supreme Court cases, volume 570
- Negligence in employment
