= Descamps v. United States =

- Supreme Court of the United States

Argued January 7, 2013 Decided June 20, 2013
- Full case name: Matthew Robert Descamps, Petitioner v. United States Attorney- Dan B. Johnson, Spokane, Washington.
- Docket no.: 11-9540
- Citations: 570 U.S. 254 (more) 133 S. Ct. 2276; 186 L. Ed. 2d 438; 2013 U.S. LEXIS 4698, 81 U.S.L.W. 4490
- Opinion announcement: Opinion announcement

Holding
- Under the Armed Career Criminal Act, judges may not look at facts associated with a crime (the "modified categorical approach") when criminal statutes contain a single, indivisible set of elements

Court membership
- Chief Justice John Roberts Associate Justices Antonin Scalia · Anthony Kennedy; Clarence Thomas · Ruth Bader Ginsburg; Stephen Breyer · Samuel Alito; Sonia Sotomayor · Elena Kagan

Case opinions
- Majority: Kagan, joined by Roberts, Scalia, Kennedy, Ginsburg, Breyer, Sotomayor
- Concurrence: Kennedy
- Concurrence: Thomas (in judgment)
- Dissent: Alito

Laws applied
- Armed Career Criminal Act

Descamps v. United States, 570 U.S. 254 (2013), was a case in which the United States Supreme Court clarified standards for evaluating potential prior offenses under the Armed Career Criminal Act (ACCA). In an 8–1 decision written by Justice Elena Kagan, the Supreme Court held that judges may only look at the statutory elements of a crime, rather than the facts associated with that particular crime, "when the crime of which the defendant was convicted has a single, indivisible set of elements." In his review of the case for SCOTUSblog, Daniel Richman opined that following the Court's decision, "[w]hether or not a prior conviction is going to 'count' will have to be determined as mechanically as possible."

== See also ==
- Taylor v. United States
- List of United States Supreme Court cases, volume 570
- 2012 term United States Supreme Court opinions of Elena Kagan
