= Peugh v. United States =

- Supreme Court of the United States

Decided June 10, 2013
- Full case name: Peugh v. United States
- Citations: 569 U.S. 530 (more)

Holding
- The Ex Post Facto Clause is violated when a defendant is sentenced under Guidelines promulgated after he committed his criminal acts and the new version provides a higher sentencing range than the version in place at the time of the offense.

Court membership
- Chief Justice John Roberts Associate Justices Antonin Scalia · Anthony Kennedy; Clarence Thomas · Ruth Bader Ginsburg; Stephen Breyer · Samuel Alito; Sonia Sotomayor · Elena Kagan

Case opinions
- Majority: Sotomayor (except as to Part III–C), joined by Ginsburg, Breyer, Kagan, Kennedy
- Plurality: Sotomayor (Part III–C), joined by Ginsburg, Breyer, Kagan
- Dissent: Thomas, joined by Roberts, Scalia, Alito (Parts I, II–C)
- Dissent: Alito, joined by Scalia

Laws applied
- Ex Post Facto Clause

Peugh v. United States, 569 U.S. 530 (2013), was a United States Supreme Court case in which the court held that the Ex Post Facto Clause is violated when a defendant is sentenced under a version of the United States Federal Sentencing Guideliness promulgated after he committed his criminal acts and the new version provides a higher sentencing range than the version in place at the time of the offense.

== Background ==
Marvin Peugh was convicted of five counts of bank fraud for conduct that occurred in 1999 and 2000. At sentencing, he argued that the Ex Post Facto Clause required that he be sentenced under the 1998 version of the Federal Sentencing Guidelines in effect at the time of his offenses rather than under the 2009 version in effect at the time of sentencing. Under the 1998 Guidelines, Peugh's sentencing range was 30 to 37 months, but the 2009 Guidelines assigned more severe consequences to his acts, yielding a range of 70 to 87 months. The district court rejected Peugh's ex post facto claim and sentenced him to 70 months' imprisonment. The Seventh Circuit affirmed.
