= Federal Employees' Group Life Insurance Act =

Federal Employees’ Group Life Insurance Act
- Long title: An act to authorize the Civil Service Commission to make available group life insurance for civilian officers and employees in the Federal service, and for other purposes.
- Acronyms (colloquial): FEGLIA
- Enacted by: the 83rd United States Congress
- Effective: August 17, 1954

Citations
- Public law: 83-598

Legislative history
- Introduced in the Senate as S. 3681 on January 6, 1954; Signed into law by President Dwight D. Eisenhower on August 17, 1954

United States Supreme Court cases
- Hillman v. Maretta

The Federal Employees' Group Life Insurance Act (FEGLIA) is a United States federal statute passed by the 83rd U.S. Congress and signed into law by President Dwight D. Eisenhower on August 17, 1954. The act provided for a group life insurance policy for most federal employees, similar to those provided for employees of most large industries.

The act established the Federal Employee Group Life Insurance (FEGLI) program, which covers over 4 million federal employees and is the largest group life insurance program in the world. Under the program, new federal employees are automatically enrolled in a basic insurance program (group term with no cash value) with the option of waiving enrollment, and may also obtain additional coverage for themselves and their families. Insurance premiums are deducted from the employees' payroll checks. The cost of the plan is shared between the employee and the federal government in a 2:1 ratio for Basic coverage only (except for USPS employees whose coverage is fully paid by USPS), any Optional coverage is paid fully by the employee.

The FEGLI program also covers NASA astronauts, in particular, those astronauts who died on board the space shuttles Challenger and Columbia.

== FEGLI Coverage ==
For specific references to the below items, see the FEGLI booklet available on the OPM website.

=== Levels of Available Coverage ===
FEGLI offers four levels of coverage: Basic and three Options (A, B, and C). In order to enroll in any Option, the employee must be enrolled in Basic.

- Basic--the amount of coverage ("Basic Insurance Amount" or BIA) equals the employee's salary (rounded up to the next $1,000) plus an additional $2,000 (e.g. an employee making $97,500 would have $100,000 of coverage: $97,500 rounded up to $98,000 + $2,000 additional = $100,000), but the minimum level of coverage is $10,000
  - The Basic coverage also provides an "Extra Benefit" for employees who die before age 45; total Basic and Extra Benefit coverage is the BIA multiplied by an "age multiplication factor", which starts at 2.0 for employees 35 and younger and decreases by 0.1 for each year until age 45 when the Extra Benefit is no longer available.
- Option A--provides an additional $10,000 of coverage, regardless of salary
- Option B--provides a multiple of the employee's salary (rounded up to the next $1,000); the employee may choose a whole multiple of 1, 2, 3, 4, or 5 times salary (no fractional multiples allowed)
- Option C--provides multiples for family members (the amounts per multiple are $5,000 for a spouse and $2,500 for each dependent child); the employee may choose a whole multiple of 1, 2, 3, 4, or 5 (no fractional multiples allowed)

Accidental death and dismemberment (AD&D) insurance is included under Basic and Option A ($10,000) at no additional charge, and is paid in addition to life insurance if applicable. There is no AD&D coverage under Options B or C. For accidental death, payment is 100% of the above amounts. For accidental dismemberment (defined as loss of a hand, foot, or sight in an eye) payment is 100% if two or more of the above are lost in the same accident, 50% if only one of the above is lost. In a specific accident no more than 100% of benefits can be paid and all injuries or death resulting from the same accident within one year of the accident are considered one event; however, in a subsequent accident benefits are paid separately.

=== Coverage during Employment ===
Employees are automatically enrolled in Basic upon appointment unless they choose to disenroll, while Optional coverage must be selected within 60 days of appointment, and in both cases enrollment and coverage are guaranteed regardless of the employee's prior medical history. Otherwise, coverage can only be obtained during an open season (unlike for Federal Employees Health Benefits insurance coverage, open seasons are not annual, and are in fact quite rare; there have been only nine open seasons in the program's history and none since 2016), by providing satisfactory medical information (after one year from the date of any prior waiver, but Option C cannot be selected on this basis), or a qualifying "life event" (marriage, divorce, acquisition of a child, or death of a spouse). If an employee leaves government service with no coverage and subsequently returns, the break must be at least 180 days in order to become eligible once again barring either a rare open season, proof of satisfactory medical information, or life event.

==== Premiums during Employment ====
The employee pays 2/3 and the government pays 1/3 of Basic coverage premiums (except for United States Postal Service employees, whose coverage is paid fully by USPS). The rates for Basic coverage (per $1,000 of coverage) are the same for all employees regardless of age.

The employee pays all cost of Optional coverage. The rates for each Option (per $1,000 of coverage) are determined by age ranges in increments of five years and increase with each increment (the rates increase substantially for employees beginning at age 50, and every five years thereafter). The newer rates begin with the first full pay period following the employee's birthday when s/he would reach the beginning of the new range.

Premiums are paid either bi-weekly or monthly, depending on the frequency of employee's pay, and are automatically deducted from pay.

=== Coverage at Retirement ===
In order to maintain continuous coverage at retirement, the employee must take an immediate annuity and must have maintained coverage for five years preceding (or, if less than five years, coverage from the employee's earliest opportunity to enroll). Unlike with the Federal Employees Health Benefits system, the five-year rule cannot be waived by the employee's agency. If a deferred annuity is taken, coverage is suspended (not terminated) from the date of retirement until the date the annuity begins.

At retirement, the employee must (for whatever coverage s/he had prior to retirement) choose how much coverage to take into retirement, and (in some cases) how much coverage will be reduced beginning at age 65 or, if still working at age 65, at retirement. An employee cannot increase coverage at retirement or at any time thereafter, nor can it be renewed once discontinued.

After age 65 (or upon retirement, if the employee retires after then) the employee may choose coverage options with no cost to the employee (i.e. premiums fully paid by the government) but which reduce levels of coverage over time (as explained below) or may choose to continue higher levels of coverage for additional premiums paid. An employee cannot increase coverage in retirement (except under Options B and C), only to reduce or discontinue it. If no choices are made, coverage is discontinued and cannot be reinstated.

- For Basic, the employee must choose one of three options: "75% Reduction" (under this option, coverage will reduce by 2% per month until reaching 25% of pre-retirement coverage, after which no further reductions are made and coverage remains at that level for the remainder of the retiree's life), "50% Reduction" (coverage will thus reduce by 1% per month until reaching 50% of pre-retirement coverage, after which no further reductions are made and coverage remains at that level for the remainder of the retiree's life) or "No Reduction". The employee pays no premiums for the 75% Reduction option but must pay all premiums for either the 50% Reduction or No Reduction options. For employees choosing either No Reduction or 50% Reduction, only the 75% Reduction can be later chosen, outside of discontinuing coverage.
- For Option A, coverage will reduce by 2% per month beginning the second month after age 65 until reaching 25% of pre-retirement coverage ($2,500) after which no further reductions are made and coverage remains at that level for the remainder of the retiree's life; the employee pays no premiums. There are no alternative reduction choices under Option A; the only other option is discontinuance.
- For Options B and C, an employee may choose either "Full Reduction" (coverage reduces 2% per month until reaching zero; the employee pays no premiums) or "No Reduction" (the employee must pay all premiums). Under each Option, an employee may "mix and match" multiples (reducing some multiples and leaving others intact), and if retiring before age 65 will be given a second opportunity to change how multiples are covered at that time if desired. Once Full Reduction is chosen for any multiple after age 65 it is irrevocable outside of discontinuing coverage.

AD&D benefits cease upon the employee's retirement and do not continue into retirement.

==== Premiums at Retirement ====
For retirees under age 65, the employee and government will continue to pay the same ratio of cost for Basic coverage as during employment (2/3 employee, 1/3 government except for USPS employees) at a rate which remains the same regardless of age, if the employee chooses the "75% Reduction" option (see below). Payments for lesser Basic coverage reductions and for Optional coverage are paid fully by the employee.

Beginning the second full month after the retiree turns age 65 (e.g. beginning March 1 for an employee with a January 20 birthday), Basic coverage with 75% Reduction, Option A, and Options B/C with Full Reduction is free; Basic coverage and Options B/C coverage with lesser or no reduction requires a premium which increases with age.

=== Payment at Death ===
Upon the death of an employee/retiree, death benefits (except for Option C) are paid as follows:

- If an employee/retiree has assigned ownership of the insurance, then to the beneficiary(ies) designated by the assignee(s), but if none, then directly to the assignee(s). (Option C coverage cannot be assigned to a third party.)
- If an employee/retiree has not assigned ownership, and a valid court order is on file directing payment, then in accordance with the terms of the order.
- If no assignment and no court order, then to the beneficiary(ies) designated by the employee/retiree.
- If no assignment, no court order, and no beneficiary(ies) designated, then the "statutory order of precedence" is used, as follows:
  - To the widow or widower,
  - To any surviving children (in equal shares) or their descendants,
  - To any surviving parent or parents,
  - To the court-appointed executor or administrator of the estate,
  - To the next of kin as determined by the laws of the state where the employee/retiree lived at death.

Upon the death of any insured under Option C, benefits are paid to the employee/retiree, but if the employee/retiree dies before payment, payment is then made to the beneficiaries who would be paid under Basic coverage, excluding any assignment of insurance.

In addition to the above, if an insured is diagnosed as terminally ill with a life expectancy of nine months or less, the insured can also elect a "living benefit", which is an accelerated payment of benefits. The benefits are paid directly to the insured, not to the beneficiaries. The benefit can either be a full benefit or a partial benefit (in multiples of $1,000); the amount paid will be less than the face value, the reduction being the interest the insurance company loses by paying early (it is believed that the amount, though, would still be more than if the policy was assigned to a third party). Premiums are reduced if the partial benefit is taken, and cease if the full benefit is taken. This option can only be taken one time and is irrevocable, but if the insured subsequently recovers, s/he is not required to repay FEGLI.
