= Mutual Pharmaceutical Co. v. Bartlett =

- Supreme Court of the United States

Argued March 19, 2013 Decided June 24, 2013
- Full case name: Mutual Pharmaceutical Co. v. Karen L. Bartlett
- Docket no.: 12-142
- Citations: 570 U.S. 472 (more) 133 S. Ct. 2466; 186 L. Ed. 2d 607; 2013 U.S. LEXIS 4702; 81 U.S.L.W. 4538
- Argument: Oral argument
- Opinion announcement: Opinion announcement

Case history
- Prior: Summary judgment granted in part, Bartlett v. Mutual Pharmaceutical Co., 731 F. Supp. 2d 135 (D.N.H. 2010); motion for new trial denied, 760 F. Supp. 2d 220 (D.N.H. 2011); affirmed, 678 F.3d 30 (1st Cir. 2012); cert. granted, 568 U.S. 1045 (2012).

Holding
- Generic drug manufactures cannot be held liable for damages under state law when it conflicts with federal law.

Court membership
- Chief Justice John Roberts Associate Justices Antonin Scalia · Anthony Kennedy; Clarence Thomas · Ruth Bader Ginsburg; Stephen Breyer · Samuel Alito; Sonia Sotomayor · Elena Kagan

Case opinions
- Majority: Alito, joined by Roberts, Scalia, Kennedy, Thomas
- Dissent: Breyer, joined by Kagan
- Dissent: Sotomayor, joined by Ginsburg

Laws applied
- U.S. Const. Art. VI, Cl. 2

Mutual Pharmaceutical Co. v. Bartlett, 570 U.S. 472 (2013), is a decision by the Supreme Court of the United States holding that generic drug manufactures cannot be held liable under state law for not adequately labeling medication when federal law prohibits them from changing the label from the original brand name drug.

== Legal Background ==
The Federal Food, Drug and Cosmetic Act (FDCA) requires that all drug manufacturers gain approval from the Food and Drug Administration (FDA) before engaging in interstate commerce. When a new brand name drug is created, the drug must be submitted under a New-Drug Application (NDA). In the NDA, a compilation of materials must include a full report of all clinical investigations and all relevant studies. The NDA may be approved by the FDA only if it finds that the drug is safe for use and the therapeutic benefits outweigh the drug's harm.

Because submitting an NDA is expensive and lengthy, the U.S. Congress set out to create an easier path for generic drugs to be issued to the public. Congress passed the Drug Price Competition and Patent Term Restoration Act of 1984, known as the Hatch-Waxman Act. It allows a generic drug to be approved for use without the onerous provisions of an NDA if the generic drug is identical to an already-approved brand-name drug. Under Hatch-Waxman, the generic drug manufacturer is prohibited from making any changes in the drug or from making any changes to the already approved label.

New Hampshire tort law imposes a duty of care on drug manufactures to produce drugs that are not unreasonably unsafe. The safety of drugs is to be judged by a combination of its chemical properties and its warning label.

== Background ==
In 1978, the Food and Drug Administration (FDA) approved an anti-inflammatory pain reliever called sulindac under the brand name Clinoril. When the patent expired, the FDA approved several generic versions including one manufactured by Mutual Pharmaceutical. The drugs have serious side-effects including hypersensitivity skin reactions with necrosis of the skin, toxic epidermal necrolysis, and Stevens–Johnson syndrome.

In 2004, the respondent Karen Bartlett was given Clinoril for shoulder pain. The pharmacist dispensed a generic form made by Mutual Pharmaceutical. Bartlett soon developed toxic epidermal necrolysis, with sixty percent of her skin destroyed. She underwent months in a medically-induced coma, 12 eye surgeries, and a year of tube-feeding.

At the time of the incident, the label did not specifically refer to developed toxic epidermal necrolysis but did warn of severe skin reactions thoughtoxic epidermal necrolysis was listed on the package insert.

== District Court ==
Bartlett sued in New Hampshire state court, but Mutual removed the case to Federal District Court. Bartlett initially argued both failure-to-warn and design-defect claims. The District Court dismissed her failure-to-warn claim on her doctor's own testimony that she had not read the box or the label. On the claim of design-defect a jury found Mutual liable for over $21 million in damages. Mutual appealed.

== Appellate Court ==
The Court of Appeals affirmed the District Court's ruling. It distinguished from an earlier case, PLIVA v. Mensing, in that generic drug makers could simply choose not to make the generic drugs to satisfy both state and federal laws.

== Supreme Court ==
The Supreme Court reversed the decision of the First Circuit, with Justice Alito writing for the majority. The Court centered its opinion on the impossibility of a generic drug manufacturer meeting its obligations under both state and federal laws. Where such conflict exists, the court writes, federal law must take primacy under the Supremacy Clause.

== Dissent ==
Justice Breyer, joined by Justice Kagan, dissented and argued that it was not totally impossible for the drug manufactures to comply with both state and federal laws. He argued that the company could either choose not to do business in the State of New Hampshire or accept that such damages as a cost of doing business.

Justice Sotomayor, joined by Justice Ginsburg, also dissented by arguing that the majority had removed Mutual from the reach of common law liability. She also argued that federal drug law should be looked at as complementary to state laws, rather than competing with them.
