= Hillman v. Maretta =

- Supreme Court of the United States

Argued April 22, 2013 Decided June 3, 2013
- Full case name: Jacqueline Hillman, petitioner, v. Judy A. Maretta
- Docket no.: 11-1221
- Citations: 569 U.S. 483 (more) 133 S. Ct. 1943; 186 L. Ed. 2d 43

Holding
- Section D of the Virginia statute is pre-empted by FEGLIA

Court membership
- Chief Justice John Roberts Associate Justices Antonin Scalia · Anthony Kennedy; Clarence Thomas · Ruth Bader Ginsburg; Stephen Breyer · Samuel Alito; Sonia Sotomayor · Elena Kagan

Case opinions
- Majority: Sotomayor, joined by Roberts, Kennedy, Ginsburg, Breyer, Kagan; Scalia (all but footnote 4)
- Concurrence: Thomas (in judgment)
- Concurrence: Alito (in judgment)

Laws applied
- Federal Employees’ Group Life Insurance Act (1954)

Hillman v. Maretta, 569 U.S. 483 (2013), was a United States Supreme Court decision in which the court unanimously ruled that a Virginia statute revoking beneficiary status for spouses whose marital status has changed was pre-empted by the Federal Employees’ Group Life Insurance Act (1954).

== Details ==
Warren Hillman was a retired employee of the General Services Administration under the Federal Government of the United States. He married Judy Maretta in 1989, but they divorced in 1998. However, Hillman had designated Maretta as his federal life insurance policy beneficiary in 1996. Warren Hillman later married Jacqueline or Jackie in 2002, but died of leukemia at the age of 66 in 2008. In his will, he had "left everything" to his wife Jackie.

After Warren Hillman's death, Maretta claimed the life insurance policy and was paid $124,558.03. Jackie Hillman sued Maretta to recover the benefits under the Commonwealth of Virginia statute that revoked a divorced spouse's beneficiary in favor of a widow or widower. The Fairfax County Circuit Court decided the case in Hillman's favor, awarding her the FEGLI benefits. However, the decision was overturned by the Virginia Supreme Court, which ruled that federal insurance programs preempt state laws, citing previous U. S. Supreme Court decisions Wissner v. Wissner and Ridgeway v. Ridgeway.

Jackie Hillman then appealed to the Supreme Court, which heard the arguments on April 22, 2013, and decided on June 3. Associate Justice Sotomayor in the majority ruling affirmed the Virginia Supreme Court decision, arguing that the order of precedence set by FEGLI sought to honor a federal employee's choice of beneficiary.
