= Amgen Inc. v. Connecticut Retirement Plans & Trust Funds =

- Supreme Court of the United States

Decided February 27, 2013
- Full case name: Amgen Inc. v. Connecticut Retirement Plans & Trust Funds
- Citations: 568 U.S. 455 (more)

Holding
- Proof of materiality is not a prerequisite to certification of a securities-fraud class action.

Court membership
- Chief Justice John Roberts Associate Justices Antonin Scalia · Anthony Kennedy; Clarence Thomas · Ruth Bader Ginsburg; Stephen Breyer · Samuel Alito; Sonia Sotomayor · Elena Kagan

Case opinions
- Majority: Ginsburg, joined by Roberts, Breyer, Alito, Sotomayor, Kagan
- Concurrence: Alito
- Dissent: Scalia
- Dissent: Thomas, joined by Kennedy; Scalia (Not Part I-B)

Laws applied
- Securities Exchange Act of 1934

Amgen Inc. v. Connecticut Retirement Plans & Trust Funds, 568 U.S. 455 (2013), was a United States Supreme Court case in which the court held that proof of materiality is not a prerequisite to certification of a securities-fraud class action.

== Background ==
To recover damages in a private securities-fraud action under §10(b) of the Securities Exchange Act of 1934 and Securities and Exchange Commission Rule 10b–5, a plaintiff must prove, among other things, reliance on a material misrepresentation or omission made by the defendant. The Supreme Court has previously observed in Basic Inc. v. Levinson that requiring proof of direct reliance "would place an unnecessarily unrealistic evidentiary burden on [a] plaintiff who has traded on an impersonal market." Thus, the Supreme Court has endorsed a "fraud-on-the-market" theory, which permits securities-fraud plaintiffs to invoke a rebuttable presumption of reliance on public, material misrepresentations regarding securities traded in an efficient market. The fraud-on-the-market theory facilitates the certification of securities-fraud class actions by permitting reliance to be proved on a classwide basis.

Invoking the fraud-on-the-market theory, Connecticut Retirement Plans and Trust Funds (Connecticut Retirement) sought certification of a securities-fraud class action under Federal Rule of Civil Procedure 23(b)(3) against biotechnology company Amgen Inc. and several of its officers (collectively, Amgen). The federal District Court certified the class, and the Ninth Circuit Court of Appeals affirmed. The Ninth Circuit rejected Amgen's argument that Connecticut Retirement was required to prove the materiality of Amgen's alleged misrepresentations and omissions before class certification in order to satisfy Rule 23(b)(3)'s requirement that "questions of law or fact common to class members predominate over any questions affecting only individual members". The Ninth Circuit also held that the District Court did not err in refusing to consider rebuttal evidence that Amgen had presented on the issue of materiality at the class-certification stage.

== Opinion of the court ==
The Supreme Court issued an opinion on February 27, 2013. The court observed that materiality is judged by an objective standard and can be proved through evidence common to the class. Thus, a failure of proof of materiality would not result in individual questions predominating, so it would not invalidate a class certification. Instead, a failure to prove materiality would end the case.
