= Materiality (law) =

Significance of facts to the matter at hand

Materiality is the significance of facts to the matter at hand.

== In the law of evidence ==
An item of evidence is said to be material if it has some logical connection to a fact of consequence to the outcome of a case. Materiality, along with probative value, is one of two characteristics that make a given item of evidence relevant. This largely depends on the elements of the cause of action the plaintiff seeks to prove, or that the prosecutor must prove in a criminal case to secure a conviction. Which issues must be factually proven are therefore a product of the underlying substantive law.

== In corporate and securities law ==
Within the context of corporate and securities law in the United States, a fact is defined as material if there is a substantial likelihood that a reasonable shareholder would consider it important in deciding how to vote their shares or invest their money. In this regard, it is similar to the accounting term of the same name.

Materiality is particularly important in the context of securities law, because under the Securities Exchange Act of 1934, a company can be held civilly or criminally liable for false, misleading, or omitted statements of fact in proxy statements and other documents, if the fact in question is found by the court to have been material pursuant to Rule 10b-5.

== In contract law ==
In the law of contracts, a material term in a contract is a term or provision that concerns significant issues, such as subject matter, price, quantity, type of work to be done, and terms of payment or performance.

== In patent law ==
In United States patent law, information is material to patentability and therefore subject to the duty of disclosure if

(1) It establishes, by itself or in combination with other information, a prima facie case of unpatentability of a claim; or
(2) It refutes, or is inconsistent with, a position the applicant takes in:

(i) Opposing an argument of unpatentability relied on by the Office, or
(ii) Asserting an argument of patentability.

== See also ==
- Material witness
