= Procedural default =

United States post-conviction doctrine

Procedural default is a concept in American federal law that requires a state prisoner seeking a writ of habeas corpus in federal court to have "present[ed] his federal law argument to the state courts in compliance with state procedural rules. Failure to do so will bar any attempt to present that argument to the federal courts on collateral review. A petitioner may evade this bar only by showing 'cause' and 'prejudice' for the default – that is, by stating a good reason for not presenting the federal claim to the state courts, and by showing that the federal error worked to the petitioner's 'actual and substantial disadvantage.'"
