= United States v. Kebodeaux =

- Supreme Court of the United States

Argued April 17, 2013 Decided June 24, 2013
- Full case name: United States v. Kebodeaux
- Docket no.: 12-418
- Citations: 570 U.S. 387 (more) 133 S. Ct. 2496; 186 L. Ed. 2d 540; 2013 U.S. LEXIS 4715

Case history
- Prior: Kebodeaux was convicted of violating SORNA - W.D. Tex.; affirmed, 647 F.3d 137 (5th Cir. 2011); petition for rehearing en banc granted, 647 F.3d 605 (5th Cir. 2011); conviction overturned under the Wetterling Act, 687 F.3d 232 (5th Cir. 2012); cert. granted, 568 U.S. 1119 (2013).
- Subsequent: Conviction affirmed on remand, 726 F.3d 737 (5th Cir. 2013).

Holding
- The Sex Offender Notification and Registration Act (SORNA) was found to be constitutional under the Necessary and Proper Clause. The circuit court's decision was reversed and remanded.

Court membership
- Chief Justice John Roberts Associate Justices Antonin Scalia · Anthony Kennedy; Clarence Thomas · Ruth Bader Ginsburg; Stephen Breyer · Samuel Alito; Sonia Sotomayor · Elena Kagan

Case opinions
- Majority: Breyer, joined by Kennedy, Ginsburg, Sotomayor, Kagan
- Concurrence: Roberts (in judgment)
- Concurrence: Alito (in judgment)
- Dissent: Scalia
- Dissent: Thomas, joined by Scalia (Parts I, II, and III–B)

Laws applied
- Necessary and Proper Clause; United States v. Sharpnack 355 U.S. 286 (1958); Smith v. Doe 538 U.S. 84 (2003); Carr v. United States 560 U.S. 438 (2010); Reynolds v. United States No. 10-6549, 565 U.S. ___ (2012)

United States v. Kebodeaux, 570 U.S. 387 (2013), was a case in which the Supreme Court of the United States held that the Sex Offender Notification and Registration Act (SORNA) was constitutional under the Necessary and Proper Clause.

== Background ==
The Sex Offender Notification and Registration Act (SORNA) is a federal law (42 U.S.C. ch. 151, subch. I) requiring federal sex offenders to register in the States where they reside, study, and/or work.

The respondent, Anthony Kebodeaux, was convicted by a court-martial of a federal sex offense. After dishonorable discharge from the Air Force, Kebodeaux moved to Texas, where he registered with state authorities as a sex offender. When he moved within Texas, he failed to update his registration and was prosecuted under SORNA. The District Court convicted. He later appealed to the Fifth Circuit, which overturned his conviction under the Wetterling Act, as SORNA had not been passed at the time of his conviction.

== Arguments ==
=== Petitioner's argument (U.S.) ===
Congress has the power to subject a federal sex offender to criminal penalties for failing to register or update said registration (18 U.S.C. § 2250(a)(2)(A)). The appeals court's decision to reverse Kebodeaux's SORNA conviction was based on a mistake in applying pre-SORNA law. Contrary to the court's decision, Kebodeaux could be prosecuted under the Wetterling Act. 18 U.S.C. § 2250(a)(2)(A) is constitutional under the Necessary and Proper Clause as a "legitimate" consequence of the conviction under Smith v. Doe.

=== Respondent's argument (Kebodeaux) ===
SORNA was an unlawful expansion of federal authority as it infringed on the states' police power. Kebodeaux's conviction violated limits set by United States v. Comstock. Additionally, the Attorney General did not adopt a regulations applying SORNA to pre-enactment offenders until after Kebodeaux's SORNA-related sentence expired.

== Decision ==
=== Majority opinion ===
The majority opinion, written by Justice Breyer, ruled that SORNA was constitutional under the Necessary and Proper Clause. Despite his release before SORNA's enactment, the release was unconditional, as opposed to what the Fifth Circuit said. Additionally, he was still subject to the Wetterling Act, which had similar requirements. This was because the crime he committed under the Uniform Code of Military Justice had been designated by the Director of the Bureau of Prisons to fall under the Wetterling Act. Congress had the power under the Military Regulation and the Necessary and Proper Clauses to apply civil consequences to the UCMJ crime.

=== Concurrences ===
==== Roberts ====
Chief Justice Roberts wrote a concurrence where he argued that the Court's opinion, with its discussion of the public safety concerns addressed by SORNA, could lead "incautious readers" to surmise the Court was endorsing a non-existent federal police power, citing United States v. Morrison.

==== Alito ====
Justice Alito also wrote a concurrence. In it, he argued that the fact that sex offenses under the UCMJ are usually only tried by military tribunals, convicted offenders might not register with the State in which they reside.

=== Dissenting opinions ===
==== Scalia ====
Justice Scalia joined in Parts I, II, and III-B of Justice Thomas's dissent, but not Part III-A. He stated this was because he did not believe that what is necessary and proper to enforce a statute under an enumerated power is not necessary and proper to the execution of that power citing Gonzales v. Raich. Scalia stated that the Opinion did not declare that the Wetterling Act, on which they based their application to Kebodeaux, was necessary and proper, or that SORNA was designed to execute the preceding act.

==== Thomas ====
Justice Thomas wrote the main dissent. He argued that SORNA was an unconstitutional usurpation of State police power. This was because SORNA failed the legitimate use test Chief Justice John Marshall set forth in McCulloch v. Maryland. Additionally, since Kebodeaux had completed his sentence, he was exempt from coverage under the Military Regulation Clause. Thomas further argued that the decision in this case violated the precedent set by United States v. Comstock.

== Subsequent history ==
The Fifth Circuit affirmed the conviction per curiam.
