= Alleyne v. United States =

- Supreme Court of the United States

Argued January 14, 2013 Decided June 17, 2013
- Full case name: Allen Ryan Alleyne, Petitioner v. United States
- Docket no.: 11-9335
- Citations: 570 U.S. 99 (more) 133 S. Ct. 2151; 186 L. Ed. 2d 314
- Opinion announcement: Opinion announcement

Case history
- Prior: United States v. Alleyne, 457 F. App'x 348 (4th Cir. 2011)

Holding
- Because mandatory minimum sentences increase the penalty for a crime, any fact that increases the mandatory minimum is an "element" of the crime that must be submitted to the jury.

Court membership
- Chief Justice John Roberts Associate Justices Antonin Scalia · Anthony Kennedy; Clarence Thomas · Ruth Bader Ginsburg; Stephen Breyer · Samuel Alito; Sonia Sotomayor · Elena Kagan

Case opinions
- Majority: Thomas, joined by Ginsburg, Breyer, Sotomayor, Kagan (Parts I, III–B, III–C, and IV); Ginsburg, Sotomayor, Kagan (Parts II and III–A)
- Concurrence: Sotomayor, joined by Ginsburg, Kagan
- Concurrence: Breyer (in part)
- Dissent: Roberts, joined by Scalia, Kennedy
- Dissent: Alito

Laws applied
- U.S. Const. amend. VI
- This case overturned a previous ruling or rulings
- Harris v. United States (2002)

Alleyne v. United States, 570 U.S. 99 (2013), was a United States Supreme Court case that decided that, in line with Apprendi v. New Jersey (2000), all facts that increase a mandatory minimum sentence for a criminal offense must be submitted to and found true by a jury, not merely determined to be true at a judge's discretion. The majority opinion was written by Justice Clarence Thomas, joined by Justices Ginsburg, Breyer, Sotomayor, and Kagan.

== Summary of findings ==
In the original trial, the defendant (Alleyne) was convicted of using or carrying a firearm in a violent crime, which carried a mandatory minimum penalty of five years' imprisonment. However, the mandatory minimum would rise to seven years if the accused were found to have "brandished" the firearm during the crime, and to ten years if it was discharged. In the original trial, the judge, rather than the jury, determined that Alleyne had probably brandished the firearm during the robbery, which caused the mandatory minimum sentence to increase to the proposed seven years. This verdict determined that, even if a jury did not find that the firearm was brandished, a judge could still unilaterally "impose a harsher sentence because of his finding, so long as that sentence remains under the statutory maximum".

The Supreme Court found that the question of whether or not the accused had brandished his weapon during the robbery was not merely a "sentencing factor," which the judge could unilaterally decide, but an "ingredient of the offense," which must be assessed and decided upon by the jury. The Court also expressly overruled Harris v. United States (2002), which had reached a contrary ruling.

== See also ==
- List of United States Supreme Court cases, volume 570
- Southern Union Co. v. United States (2012)
