= List of United States Supreme Court cases by the Roberts Court =

Supreme Court of the United States
Roberts Court
- Rehnquist Court ← → Current
- Since September 29, 2005 – 21 years, 34 days
- Seat: Supreme Court Building; Washington, D.C.
- No. of positions: 9
- Roberts Court decisions

This is a partial chronological list of cases decided by the United States Supreme Court during the Roberts Court, the tenure of Chief Justice John Roberts from September 29, 2005 to the present.

== Roberts Court 2005 term ==
The 2005 term began October 3, 2005, and concluded October 1, 2006. Notable cases included the following:

Case name	Citation	Summary
Gonzales v. Oregon	546 U.S. 243 (2006)	Attorney General did not permissibly construe Controlled Substances Act to prohibit the distribution of drugs for physician-assisted suicide
Ayotte v. Planned Parenthood of Northern New England	546 U.S. 320 (2006)	Invalidating statute and lower courts rendering narrower declaratory and injunctive relief
Rice v. Collins	546 U.S. 333 (2006)	Habeas corpus relief may not be granted on the basis of debatable inferences used to overturn the trial court's finding vis-á-vis peremptory challenges
Central Virginia Community College v. Katz	546 U.S. 356 (2006)	state sovereign immunity under the 11th Amendment and the Bankruptcy Clause
Gonzales v. O Centro Espirita Beneficente Uniao do Vegetal	546 U.S. 418 (2006)	Federal government could not bar religious use of hallucinogenic tea
Buckeye Check Cashing, Inc. v. Cardegna	546 U.S. 440 (2006)	Arbitrator must decide legality of contract unless arbitration clause is itself being challenged
Domino's Pizza, Inc. v. McDonald	546 U.S. 470 (2006)	agent of a party to a contract cannot state a claim under 42 U.S.C. § 1981 because he himself does not have rights to make or enforce under the contract
Dolan v. United States Postal Service	546 U.S. 481 (2006)	scope of immunity of the United States Postal Service under the Federal Tort Claims Act
Arbaugh v. Y & H Corporation	546 U.S. 500 (2006)	"Employee-numerosity" requirement of Title VII of the Civil Rights Act of 1964 is substantive, rather than jurisdictional in nature
Oregon v. Guzek	546 U.S. 517 (2006)	States may constitutionally limit the evidence of innocence a defendant convicted of a capital offense may present at his sentencing hearing to the evidence already presented at his trial.
Texaco, Inc. v. Dagher	547 U.S. 1 (2006)	joint venture was not a price-fixing scheme under antitrust law
Scheidler v. National Organization for Women	547 U.S. 9 (2006)	physical violence unrelated to robbery or extortion falls outside the scope of the Hobbs Act
Illinois Tool Works, Inc. v. Independent Ink, Inc.	547 U.S. 28 (2006)	patented products involved in product tying arrangements are not presumed to have market power under antitrust law
Rumsfeld v. Forum for Academic and Institutional Rights	547 U.S. 47 (2006)	law schools receiving federal funds may not ban military recruiters
United States v. Grubbs	547 U.S. 90 (2006)	anticipatory search warrant did not violate the particularity clause of the 4th Amendment
Georgia v. Randolph	547 U.S. 103 (2006)	police cannot conduct a warrantless search in a home where one occupant consents and the other objects
Day v. McDonough	547 U.S. 198 (2006)	A State's unintentional failure to object to the filing of a habeas corpus petition after the statute of limitations has expired does not prevent a district court from dismissing the petition on its own initiative
Northern Ins. Co. of N.Y. v. Chatham County	547 U.S. 268 (2006)	sovereign immunity does not apply to admiralty suit against county
Jones v. Flowers	547 U.S. 220 (2006)	sufficiency of notice for tax sale
Hartman v. Moore	547 U.S. 250 (2006)	A plaintiff in a retaliatory prosecution action against federal officials must plead and show the absence of probable cause for pressing the underlying criminal charges.
Ark. Dep't of Human Servs. v. Ahlborn	547 U.S. 268 (2006)	state liens on personal injury settlements
Marshall v. Marshall	547 U.S. 293 (2006)	federal bankruptcy court binding state court on inheritance question
Holmes v. South Carolina	547 U.S. 319 (2006)	limitations on exclusion of evidence in murder case, 6th Amendment
DaimlerChrysler Corp. v. Cuno	547 U.S. 332 (2006)	taxpayer standing in a Dormant Commerce Clause case
Sereboff v. Mid Atlantic Medical Services, Inc.	547 U.S. 356 (2006)	fiduciary's recovery of personal injury settlement under ERISA
eBay Inc. v. MercExchange, L.L.C.	547 U.S. 388 (2006)	nature of patent injunctions – revisiting Continental Paper Bag Co. v. Eastern Paper Bag Co.
S. D. Warren Co. v. Maine Bd. of Env. Protection	547 U.S. 370 (2006)	interpreting scope of activities covered by the Clean Water Act
Brigham City v. Stuart	547 U.S. 398 (2006)	reasonableness of officers' warrantless entry into a home to stop a fight under the "emergency aid exception"
Garcetti v. Ceballos	547 U.S. 410 (2006)	extent of public employees' First Amendment right to free speech in the workplace
Anza v. Ideal Steel Supply Corp.	547 U.S. 451 (2006)	activities subject to RICO
Zedner v. United States	547 U.S. 489 (2006)	a criminal defendant may not prospectively waive his rights under the Speedy Trial Act
House v. Bell	547 U.S. 518 (2006)	Post-conviction DNA forensic evidence can be considered in death penalty appeals
Hill v. McDonough	547 U.S. 573 (2006)	a challenge to lethal injection as violating the Eighth Amendment properly raised a claim under 42 U.S.C. § 1983, and is not barred by previous habeas corpus petition
Hudson v. Michigan	547 U.S. 586 (2006)	evidence obtained with a search warrant is admissible even when police violate 'knock-and-announce' rule
Rapanos v. United States	547 U.S. 715 (2006)	whether wetlands are part of the "navigable waters of the United States" and thus regulated by the Clean Water Act
Davis v. Washington	547 U.S. 813 (2006)	whether a 911 call is "testimonial" under Crawford v. Washington
Samson v. California	547 U.S. 843 (2006)	evidence obtained in a suspicionless search of parolees is admissible, and not prohibited under the Fourth Amendment
Dixon v. United States	548 U.S. 1 (2006)	burden of proof for duress as a defense to Federal firearms law violations
Burlington Northern & Santa Fe Railway Co. v. White	548 U.S. 53 (2006)	a job reassignment which is dirtier and more strenuous may constitute retaliatory discrimination under the Civil Rights Act of 1964, as may a month of suspension without pay even when the employee receives back pay
Woodford v. Ngo	548 U.S. 81 (2006)	the Prison Litigation Reform Act requires proper exhaustion of administrative remedies before an inmate can file a lawsuit
United States v. Gonzalez-Lopez	548 U.S. 140 (2006)	trial court's erroneous deprivation of a criminal defendant's choice of counsel entitles him to reversal of his conviction
Kansas v. Marsh	548 U.S. 163 (2006)	statute allowing the death penalty in cases where the aggravating and mitigating evidence are equal does not violate the Eighth Amendment
Randall v. Sorrell	548 U.S. 230 (2006)	campaign finance laws which limit expenditures violate the First Amendment, and the anticorruption benefits of contribution limits must be weighed against their First Amendment costs
Arlington Central School Dist. Bd. of Ed. v. Murphy	548 U.S. 291 (2006)	The Individuals with Disabilities Education Act does not authorize the award of experts' fees to prevailing plaintiffs
Sanchez-Llamas v. Oregon	548 U.S. 331 (2006)	informing a suspect of his rights under the Vienna Convention on Consular Relations
League of United Latin American Citizens v. Perry	548 U.S. 399 (2006)	Texas's 2003 redistricting of District 23 constituted a violation of Latinos' rights under the Voting Rights Act of 1965, however mid-decade redistricting is constitutional as long as it is not solely motivated by partisan gain
Hamdan v. Rumsfeld	548 U.S. 557 (2006)	Guantanamo Bay detainees may not be tried by a military commission under the Detainee Treatment Act of 2005; the Uniform Code of Military Justice and the Geneva Conventions both apply to the detainees
Clark v. Arizona	548 U.S. 735 (2006)	constitutionality of Arizona's insanity defense statute

== Roberts Court 2006 term ==
The 2006 term began October 2, 2006, and concluded September 30, 2007. Notable cases included the following:

Case name	Citation	Summary
Purcell v. Gonzalez	549 U.S. 1 (2006)	courts should not change election rules too close to elections
Lopez v. Gonzales	549 U.S. 47 (2006)	misdemeanor drug crimes as aggravated felonies
Carey v. Musladin	549 U.S. 70 (2006)	spectator publicity and the right to a fair trial; "clearly established" law under the AEDPA
BP America Production Co. v. Burton	549 U.S. 84 (2007)	Statute of limitations on contract actions by the Federal Government under 28 U.S.C. § 2415 is not applicable to administrative proceedings
Medimmune, Inc. v. Genentech, Inc.	549 U.S. 118 (2007)	enforceability of patents before infringement
Cunningham v. California	549 U.S. 270 (2007)	applicability of Blakely v. Washington to California's determinate sentencing law
Philip Morris USA v. Williams	549 U.S. 346 (2007)	constitutional limitations on punitive damages
Marrama v. Citizens Bank of Massachusetts	549 U.S. 365 (2007)	bad-faith exception to the right to convert Chapter 7 bankruptcy case to a Chapter 13 case
Sinochem International Co., Ltd. v. Malaysia International Shipping Corporation	549 U.S. 422 (2007)	District Court may respond immediately to defendant's forum non conveniens motion before resolving jurisdictional or other threshold concerns
Massachusetts v. Environmental Protection Agency	549 U.S. 497 (2007)	power to regulate carbon dioxide emissions
Davenport v. Washington Education Association	550 U.S. 117 (2007)	A state may require that its public-sector unions receive authorization from nonmembers before spending their agency fees for election-related purposes
Gonzales v. Carhart	550 U.S. 124 (2007)	Partial-Birth Abortion Ban Act
James v. United States	550 U.S. 192 (2007)	attempted burglary as a predicate crime under the Armed Career Criminal Act
Scott v. Harris	550 U.S. 372 (2007)	Fourth Amendment seizure in a high-speed chase, qualified immunity
KSR v. Teleflex	550 U.S. 398 (2007)	Patent law, nonobviousness
Microsoft v. AT&T	550 U.S. 437 (2007)	copying software in a foreign country cannot violate U.S. patent law
Ledbetter v. Goodyear Tire & Rubber Co.	550 U.S. 618 (2007)	statute of limitations on employment discrimination claims
Permanent Mission of India v. City of New York	551 U.S. 193 (2007)	whether a municipality can sue other countries to collect unpaid taxes
Bowles v. Russell	551 U.S. 205 (2007)	Federal Courts of Appeals lack jurisdiction to hear habeas appeals that are filed late, even if the district court said the petitioner had additional time to file
Brendlin v. California	551 U.S. 249 (2007)	whether a passenger in an automobile is "detained" so that he may assert a Fourth Amendment violation stemming from the traffic stop itself
Credit Suisse v. Billing	551 U.S. 264 (2007)	Whether Congress's creation of the SEC implicitly exempted regulated industries from antitrust lawsuits
Rita v. United States	551 U.S. 338 (2007)	"reasonableness" of a federal prison sentence under United States v. Booker; continuing application of the Federal Sentencing Guidelines
Tellabs, Inc. v. Makor Issues & Rights, Ltd.	551 U.S. 308 (2007)	The proper standard for determining whether a plaintiff has alleged a "strong inference" of scienter under the PSLRA
Morse v. Frederick	551 U.S. 393 (2007)	free speech rights of high school students ("Bong Hits 4 Jesus")
CBOCS West v. Humphries	551 U.S. 442 (2008)	race retaliation claims under 42 U.S.C. § 1981
Federal Election Commission v. Wisconsin Right to Life, Inc.	551 U.S. 449 (2007)	Bipartisan Campaign Reform Act's restriction on issue ads in election campaigns
Hein v. Freedom From Religion Foundation	551 U.S. 587 (2007)	taxpayer standing to pursue an Establishment Clause claim against President Bush's faith-based initiative
Parents Involved in Community Schools v. Seattle School District No. 1 Meredith v. Jefferson County Board of Education (companion case)	551 U.S. 701 (2007)	affirmative action; using race as a tie-breaker in assigning students to public schools
Leegin Creative Leather Products, Inc. v. PSKS, Inc.	551 U.S. 877 (2007)	applying rule of reason under Section 1 of the Sherman Act
Panetti v. Quarterman	551 U.S. 930 (2007)	executing the mentally ill

== Roberts Court 2007 term ==
The 2007 term began October 1, 2007, and concluded September 30, 2008. Notable cases included the following:

Case name	Citation	Summary
Watson v. United States	552 U.S. 74 (2007)	whether trading drugs for a gun constitutes use of a firearm under 18 U.S.C. § 924 and Bailey v. United States
Kimbrough v. United States	552 U.S. 85 (2007)	whether the 100:1 ratio between powder and crack cocaine imposed by the United States Sentencing Commission yields "reasonable" sentences
Gall v. United States	552 U.S. 38 (2007)	"reasonableness" of a federal prison sentence under United States v. Booker; continuing application of the Federal Sentencing Guidelines
Stoneridge Investment Partners v. Scientific-Atlanta	552 U.S. 147 (2008)	third parties, such as investment banks, accounting firms and suppliers, can be shielded from liability if they engage in business with companies that are involved in securities fraud.
Ali v. Federal Bureau of Prisons	552 U.S. 214 (2008)	Case upholding the United States's sovereign immunity against tort claims brought when "any law enforcement officer" loses a person's property.
Riegel v. Medtronic, Inc.	552 U.S. 312 (2008)	Medical Device Amendment's preemption clause bars common-law claims challenging the safety or effectiveness of a medical device marketed in a form that received premarket approval from the FDA.
Preston v. Ferrer	552 U.S. 346 (2008)	the Federal Arbitration Act preempts state laws declaring that certain disputes must be resolved by a state administrative agency
Snyder v. Louisiana	552 U.S. 472 (2008)	racial discrimination in jury selection; playing the "O.J. card"
Medellín v. Texas	552 U.S. 491 (2008)	whether the president may direct state courts to obey an order of the World Court ruling regarding the Vienna Convention on Consular Relations
New Jersey v. Delaware	552 U.S. 597 (2008)	boundary dispute between New Jersey and Delaware involving the Twelve-Mile Circle
MeadWestvaco Corp. v. Illinois Dept. of Revenue	553 U.S. 16 (2008)	determination of state tax liability for corporation operating in multiple states according to the "unitary business rule"
Baze v. Rees	553 U.S. 35 (2008)	constitutionality of lethal injection protocols under the Eighth Amendment
Virginia v. Moore	553 U.S. 164 (2008)	whether the Fourth Amendment requires suppression of evidence discovered in a search conducted in violation of state law
Crawford v. Marion County Election Board	553 U.S. 181 (2008)	constitutionality of requiring voters to show ID before voting
Department of Revenue of Kentucky v. Davis	553 U.S. 328 (2008)	Kentucky statute providing a preferential tax break to Kentucky residents who invest in bonds issued by the state and its municipalities does not discriminate against interstate commerce
United States v. Williams	553 U.S. 285 (2008)	constitutionality of the PROTECT Act, a 2003 law intended to bolster federal restriction against child pornography, in the wake of Ashcroft v. Free Speech Coalition
Gomez-Perez v. Potter	553 U.S. 474 (2008)	Federal employees who face retaliation after filing an age discrimination claim are authorized to sue under the federal-sector provision of the Age Discrimination in Employment Act of 1967.
Quanta v. LG Electronics	553 U.S. 617 (2008)	patent exhaustion and its applicability to certain types of method patents
Boumediene v. Bush	553 U.S. 723 (2008)	whether the Military Detainee Treatment Act of 2006 unconstitutionally suspends the writ of habeas corpus
Allison Engine Co. v. United States ex rel. Sanders	553 U.S. 662 (2008)	Plaintiffs under the False Claims Act must demonstrate that the defendants intended to deceive the government, not simply that government money was used to pay the claim.
Munaf v. Geren	553 U.S. 674 (2008)	habeas corpus statute extends to American citizens held overseas by American forces operating subject to an American chain of command
Indiana v. Edwards	554 U.S. 164 (2008)	may a criminal defendant be competent to stand trial yet simultaneously not competent to represent himself at that trial?
Greenlaw v. United States	554 U.S. 237 (2008)	may a federal appeals court sua sponte increase a defendant's sentence on appeal, without a formal appeal by the government?
Rothgery v. Gillespie County	554 U.S. 191 (2008)	does a criminal defendant have a right to counsel at an ex parte arraignment?
Exxon Shipping Co. v. Baker	554 U.S. 471 (2008)	legality of punitive damages award under federal maritime law for the Exxon Valdez oil spill
Kennedy v. Louisiana	554 U.S. 407 (2008)	does the Eighth Amendment forbid the death penalty for rape of a child?
Giles v. California	554 U.S. 353 (2008)	the forfeiture by wrongdoing exception to out of court statements by a witness only applies where the defendant caused the witness's absence in order to eliminate their testimony at trial
District of Columbia v. Heller	554 U.S. 570 (2008)	does the Second Amendment allow a state or local government to outlaw the private possession of handguns?
Davis v. Federal Election Commission	554 U.S. 724 (2008)	"Millionaire's amendment" to the Bipartisan Campaign Reform Act of 2002 violates the First Amendment

== Roberts Court 2008 term ==
The 2008 term began October 6, 2008, and concluded October 4, 2009. Notable cases included the following:

Case name	Citation	Summary
Winter v. Natural Resources Defense Council	555 U.S. 7 (2008)	military preparedness outweighs environmental concerns, as Navy needs to train its crews to detect modern, silent submarines
Altria Group, Inc. v. Good	555 U.S. 70 (2008)	federal law does not preempt the states' prerogative to regulate the advertisement of tar and nicotine rates in cigarettes
Herring v. United States	555 U.S. 135 (2009)	evidence obtained during a search the police conducted as a result of an isolated act of negligence not related to the search is not subject to the exclusionary rule
Oregon v. Ice	555 U.S. 160 (2009)	the facts necessary for imposing consecutive prison terms need not be submitted to a jury in accordance with Apprendi v. New Jersey
Waddington v. Sarausad	555 U.S. 179 (2009)	on federal habeas review, courts must accept state court determinations that jury instructions fully and correctly set out state law with regard to accomplice liability
Pearson v. Callahan	555 U.S. 223 (2009)	Saucier v. Katz is overruled; courts need not determine whether a civil-rights plaintiff's constitutional rights were violated if they determine that the right was not clearly established at the time of the injury
Fitzgerald v. Barnstable School Committee	555 U.S. 246 (2009)	The petitioner parents had the right to sue a school committee under 42 U.S.C. § 1983 for failing to stop the sexual harassment their daughter endured. This decision reversed the Second Circuit's holding that Title IX provided the sole remedy the parents could seek.
Crawford v. Nashville	555 U.S. 271 (2009)	Employees who cooperate with an internal investigation of alleged sexual harassment are protected against retaliation under Title VII of the 1964 Civil Rights Act.
Van de Kamp v. Goldstein	555 U.S. 335 (2009)	Prosecutors are immune from suit under 42 U.S.C. § 1983 for improperly supervising the disclosures made by line prosecutors pursuant to Brady v. Maryland.
United States v. Hayes	555 U.S. 415 (2009)	Under 18 U.S.C. § 922(g)(9), people who have been convicted of misdemeanor domestic violence crimes may not possess firearms as long as the government proves that the underlying offense involved a domestic relationship.
Pleasant Grove City v. Summum	555 U.S. 460 (2009)	A municipality that allows a privately donated Ten Commandments monument to be displayed on public property need not permit the religion of Summum to put up its own statue of similar size.
Negusie v. Holder	555 U.S. 511 (2009)	Under Chevron v. Natural Resources Defense Council, the Board of Immigration Appeals (rather than a federal court) has the power to decide whether the so-called "persecutor bar" applies to asylum applicants applies to those who were forced to persecute others in their home country.
Wyeth v. Levine	555 U.S. 555 (2009)	Federal drug labeling requirements do not preempt state drug labeling requirements enacted to ensure that the public knew certain drugs are safe.
Harbison v. Bell	556 U.S. 180 (2009)	Under 18 U.S.C. § 3599, the federal government must provide lawyers to death row inmates seeking clemency in state proceedings.
Entergy v. Riverkeeper	556 U.S. 208 (2009)	The Clean Water Act does not prevent the EPA from engaging in a cost-benefit analysis when setting standards for power plants that use large quantities of water for cooling.
14 Penn Plaza LLC v. Pyett	556 U.S. 247 (2009)	An employer and a union can agree, through a collective bargaining agreement, that the unionized employees must resolve discrimination claims in arbitration instead of court.
Arizona v. Gant	556 U.S. 332 (2009)	Police power to search an arrested person's vehicle is limited to safety concerns and evidence related to the actual arrest.
FCC v. Fox Television Stations	556 U.S. 502 (2009)	The FCC may ban "fleeting expletives" on television broadcasts.
Cone v. Bell	556 U.S. 449 (2009)	The petitioner death row inmate had not forfeited the opportunity to argue that prosecutors withheld evidence important to his defense.
Dean v. United States	556 U.S. 568 (2009)	Upheld sentence for discharging a firearm during a violent crime, Congress intended a defendant to be held strictly liable for such an offense.
Flores-Figueroa v. United States	556 U.S. 646 (2009)	Whether the law enhancing the sentence for identity theft requires proof that an individual knew that the identity card or number he had used belonged to another, actual person
Ashcroft v. Iqbal	556 U.S. 662 (2009)	Whether top government officials can be held personally liable for allegedly knowing or condoning of racial and religious mistreatment of suspected terrorists
AT&T Corp. v. Hulteen	556 U.S. 701 (2009)	The Pregnancy Discrimination Act of 1978 is not retroactive, so maternity leave taken before it passed cannot be considered in calculating employee pension benefits.
Caperton v. A. T. Massey Coal Co.	556 U.S. 868 (2009)	Due process requirements for judges' recusal
United States ex rel. Eisenstein v. City of New York	556 U.S. 928 (2009)	Where the Government has not intervened or actively participated, private plaintiffs under the False Claims Act must file an appeal within 30 days of the judgment or order being appealed, according to the Federal Rules of Appellate Procedure.
District Attorney's Office v. Osborne	557 U.S. 52 (2009)	Found no due process, postconviction right to access to the state's evidence for DNA testing.
Northwest Austin Municipal Utility District No. 1 v. Holder	557 U.S. 193 (2009)	§5 of the Voting Rights Act stands, but districts should be better able to "bail out" of it per §4(a)
Melendez-Diaz v. Massachusetts	557 U.S. 305 (2009)	Under the Confrontation Clause of the Sixth Amendment, the prosecution (if it plans to present a lab report as evidence in a criminal trial) must make the analyst who prepared it available for on-demand cross-examination by defense counsel.
Safford Unified School District v. Redding	557 U.S. 364 (2009)	Strip search of a middle schooler violated the Fourth Amendment where the school lacked reasons to suspect either that the drugs presented a danger or that they were concealed in her underwear.
Ricci v. DeStefano	557 U.S. 557 (2009)	White firefighters in New Haven suffered unfair discrimination because of their race when the city scrapped the results of a promotional exam.

== Roberts Court 2009 term ==
The 2009 term began October 5, 2009, and concluded October 3, 2010. Notable cases included the following:

Case name	Opinion	Decided	Summary
Citizens United v. FEC	08-205	2010-01-21	whether federal campaign finance laws apply to a critical film about Senator Hillary Clinton intended to be shown in theaters and on-demand to cable subscribers
Padilla v. Kentucky	08-651	2010-03-31	must a criminal defendant's lawyer advise him of the immigration-related consequences of a criminal conviction?
Salazar v. Buono	08-472	2010-04-28	First Amendment restrictions on displaying a cross on public property
Reed Elsevier, Inc. v. Muchnick	08-103	2010-03-02	settlement of copyright infringement claims relating to an electronic database
Graham v. Florida	08-7412	2010-05-17	whether Roper v. Simmons should also apply to sentences of life without the possibility of parole
Ontario v. Quon	08-1332	2010-06-17	Privacy rights of public employees over text messages on employer-issued pagers.
McDonald v. Chicago	08-1521	2010-06-28	whether the Second Amendment should also apply against state and local governments

== Roberts Court 2010 term ==
The 2010 term began October 4, 2010, and concluded October 1, 2011. Notable cases included the following:

Case name	Opinion	Decided	Summary
Abbott v. United States	09-479	2010-11-15	Mandatory minimum sentences under federal sentencing law
Los Angeles County v. Humphries	09-350	2010-11-30	Section 1983 actions are limited to those caused by a municipality's "policy or custom" regardless of whether the plaintiff seeks monetary or prospective relief.
Premo, Superintendent, Oregon State Penitentiary v. Moore	09-658	2011-01-19	Habeas relief may not be granted with respect to any claim a state-court has found on the merits unless the state-court decision denying relief involves an "unreasonable application" of "clearly established federal law, as determined by" the Court.
Swarthout v. Cooke	10-333	2011-01-24	State prisoners have no constitutional right to parole.
Snyder v. Phelps	09-751	2011-03-02	The First Amendment protects from tort liability a person who speaks about a public issue on a public sidewalk, even if that speech is "outrageous."
Brown v. Plata	09-1233	2011-05-23	A three-judge panel of the District Court properly ordered the California prison system to release prisoners to resolve overcrowding.
Connick v. Thompson	09-571	2011-03-29	A prosecutor's office cannot be held liable for a single Brady violation by one of its members on the theory that the office provided inadequate training.
Williamson v. Mazda	08-1314	2011-02-23	A car accident victim can sue the manufacturer for failing to install a shoulder/lap seatbelt even where federal law permits it to install only a lap belt.
Arizona Christian School Tuition Org. v. Winn	09-987	2011-04-04	Taxpayers lack standing to challenge a tax credit program that provides dollar-for-dollar incentives to donations to school tuition groups, including those awarding tuition scholarships only to religious schools.
Chamber of Commerce v. Whiting	09-115	2011-05-26	An Arizona law that sanctions employers who hire illegal immigrants is not preempted by federal immigration law.
J.D.B. v. North Carolina	09-11121	2011-06-16	Age is relevant in Miranda cases.
Bullcoming v. New Mexico	09-10876	2011-06-23	A defendant's Confrontation Clause rights cover a non-testifying laboratory analyst whose supervisor testifies as to test results that the analyst transcribed from a machine.
Brown v. Entertainment Merchants Association	08-1448	2011-06-27	The Constitution prevents the state of California from banning the sale of violent video games to minors.

== Roberts Court 2011 term ==
The 2011 term began October 3, 2011, and concluded September 30, 2012. Notable cases included the following:

Case name	Opinion	Decided	Summary
Cavazos v. Smith	10-1115	2011-10-31	A jury found that a grandmother was guilty of assaulting her 7-week-old grandchild, which the jury found had died of shaken baby syndrome. The Supreme Court held that the Ninth Circuit exceeded its authority under 28 U.S.C. § 2254(d) in reversing the verdict for insufficient evidence.
KPMG LLP v. Cocchi	10-1521	2011-11-07	Citing Dean Witter Reynolds Inc. v. Byrd, the Supreme Court remanded this case to a Florida appellate court for consideration of whether arbitration was required for some of the claims alleged.
Bobby v. Dixon	10-1540	2011-11-07	Under the Antiterrorism and Effective Death Penalty Act (28 U.S.C. § 2254) and Harrington v. Richter, the Sixth Circuit had erred in granting a state prisoner's petition for writ of habeas corpus. It was not clear the state court had erred at all, a prerequisite for granting a habeas petition.
Golan v. Holder		2012-01-18	Congress can restore copyright protection to works that were formerly in the public domain.
Southern Union Co. v. United States	11-94	2012-06-21	The rule of Apprendi v. New Jersey applies to the imposition of criminal fines.

== Roberts Court 2012 term ==
The 2012 term began October 1, 2012, and concluded October 6, 2013. Notable cases included the following:

Case name	Opinion	Decided	Summary
Lefemine v. Wideman	12-168	2012-11-05	Under 42 U.S.C. § 1988, a plaintiff who obtained only a permanent injunction against government officials (but no money damages) was a "prevailing party," so the government must pay his attorney fees.
United States v. Bormes	11-192	2012-11-13	The Little Tucker Act does not waive the government's sovereign immunity with respect to Fair Credit Reporting Act damages actions.
Nitro-Lift Technologies, LLC v. Howard	11-1377	2012-11-26	The Oklahoma Supreme Court was wrong in preventing arbitration of a dispute over the scope of noncompete agreements in employment contracts.
Arkansas Game and Fish Commission v. United States	11-597	2012-12-04	Repeated, temporary flooding caused by the government is not automatically exempt from the Takings Clause, so the case was remanded for the lower court to decide if the government has to pay owners for using their land.
Kloeckner v. Solis	11-184	2012-12-10	A federal employee who claims that an agency action appealable to the Merit Systems Protection Board violates an antidiscrimination statute listed in 5 U.S.C. § 7702(a)(1) should seek judicial review in district court, not the Federal Circuit, regardless whether the MSPB decided her case on procedural grounds or on the merits.
Ryan v. Valencia Gonzales Tibbals v. Carter (companion case)	10-930	2013-01-08	The federal law at issue, 18 U.S.C. § 3599, does not provide a state prisoner with the right to suspend his federal habeas proceedings when he is adjudged incompetent.
Los Angeles County Flood Control Dist. v. Natural Resources Defense Council, Inc.	11-460	2013-01-08	The flow of water from an improved portion of a navigable waterway into an unimproved portion of the same waterway does not qualify as a "discharge of a pollutant" under the Clean Water Act.
Already, LLC v. Nike, Inc.	11-982	2013-01-09	Nike's irrevocable promise not to enforce its trademark against its competitor mooted the competitor's lawsuit to invalidate the trademark.
Smith v. United States (2013)	11-8976	2013-01-09	A defendant bears the burden of proving a defense of withdrawal from conspiracy.
Lozman v. City of Riviera Beach, Florida	11-626	2013-01-15	Petitioner's floating home was not a "vessel" for purposes of 1 U.S.C. § 3, and therefore federal maritime jurisdiction was not triggered, because—except for the fact that it floats—nothing about it suggested that it was intended to transport people or things over water.
Sebelius v. Auburn Regional Medical Center	11-1231	2013-01-22	The 180-day statute of limitations for a hospital to appeal a final Medicare reimbursement is not "jurisdictional," but it is also not subject to equitable tolling.
Chafin v. Chafin	11-1347	2013-02-19	The return of a child to a foreign country pursuant to an order under the Hague Convention on the Civil Aspects of International Child Abduction does not render an appeal of that order moot; that is, the losing party can still appeal.
Bailey v. United States (2013)	11-770	2013-02-19	In Michigan v. Summers, the Supreme Court held that police officers executing a search warrant were allowed to detain people on the premises while they conducted the search. This case limits that to the "immediate vicinity" of the place being searched, so police searching a basement apartment couldn't search a man leaving from near the apartment in a car.
FTC v. Phoebe Putney Health System, Inc.	11-1160	2013-02-19	The state of Georgia was not immune from an antitrust lawsuit challenging the competition-reducing acquisitions of a state-owned hospital.
Florida v. Harris	11-817	2013-02-19	Because the police provided evidence showing the dog did well at training, a dog sniff provided probable cause for a search of a vehicle.
Gunn v. Minton	11-1118	2013-02-20	The federal law giving federal courts exclusive jurisdiction over patent cases, 28 U.S.C. § 1338(a), does not deprive state courts of the authority to hear a state law claim alleging legal malpractice in an underlying patent case.
Henderson v. United States	11-9307	2013-02-20	Regardless whether a legal question was settled or unsettled at the time of trial, an error is "plain" within the meaning of Federal Rule of Criminal Procedure 52(b) so long as the error was plain at the time of appellate review.
Johnson v. Williams	11-465	2013-02-20	Under 28 U.S.C. § 2254, a federal court hearing a habeas petition from a state prisoner must presume that the state court decided the prisoner's federal claim on the merits, even if the state court did not expressly address that federal claim.
Evans v. Michigan	11-1327	2013-02-20	The Double Jeopardy Clause bars retrial following a court-directed acquittal, even if the acquittal was erroneous.
Chaidez v. United States	11-820	2013-02-20	The Court's decision in Padilla v. Kentucky, holding that the Sixth Amendment requires defense attorneys to inform criminal defendants of the deportation risks of guilty pleas, does not apply retroactively to cases already final on direct review (that is, non-habeas appeals).
Marx v. General Revenue Corp.	11-1175	2013-02-26	Under Federal Rule of Civil Procedure 54(d)(1), a prevailing defendant in a Fair Debt Collection Practices Act suit may be awarded costs even where the lawsuit was not brought in bad faith and for the purpose of harassment.
Clapper v. Amnesty International USA	11-1025	2013-02-26	Petitioners, a group of journalists and lawyers, did not have standing to challenge a federal law expanding the government's ability to engage in secret wiretapping because they could not prove they had been, or were about to be, wiretapped.
Gabelli v. SEC	11-1274	2013-02-27	The five-year statute of limitations for the SEC to bring a civil suit seeking penalties for securities fraud against investment advisers begins to tick when the fraud occurs, not when it is discovered.
Amgen Inc. v. Connecticut Retirement Plans and Trust Funds	11-1085	2013-02-27	In a private securities fraud class action, under the Securities Exchange Act of 1934 and an SEC rule, plaintiff class members do not need to prove that the fraud was "material" to their purchase of the securities.
Levin v. United States	11-1351	2013-03-04	The Gonzalez Act, 10 U.S.C. § 1089(e), waives some of the government's immunity, and so allowed a plaintiff to sue the United States for alleged medical battery inflicted by a Navy doctor during a cataracts surgery.
Kirtsaeng v. John Wiley & Sons, Inc.	11-697	2013-03-19	The first-sale doctrine applies to copyrighted works made lawfully overseas.
Standard Fire Ins. Co. v. Knowles	11-1450	2013-03-19	Class representative of plaintiff class cannot defeat federal jurisdiction under the Class Action Fairness Act by stipulating that he will seek less than $5 million in damages. His stipulation does not bind the rest of the class.
Decker v. Northwest Environmental Defense Center	11-338	2013-03-20	The Clean Water Act does not require a permit before channeled stormwater runoff from logging roads can be discharged into rivers and other bodies of water. Reversing the Ninth Circuit, the Court held that the lawsuit was not barred, but that the EPA's interpretation of its own regulation (not requiring permits) was entitled to deference.
Wos v. E.M.A.	12-98	2013-03-20	A part of the federal Medicaid statute known as the "anti-lien provision" preempted a North Carolina law. That state law had required Medicaid beneficiaries who received money from a tort judgment or settlement to give one-third of that money to the state to reimburse it for the free medical care it had provided to the person.
Florida v. Jardines	11-564	2013-03-26	A dog sniff at the front door of a house constitutes a "search" for purposes of the Fourth Amendment.
Comcast Corp. v. Behrend	11-864	2013-03-27	The Third Circuit improperly certified a class action against cable company Comcast under Rule 23(b). The damages model the class proposed was not adequate.
Millbrook v. United States	11-10362	2013-03-27	The petitioner, a prisoner, was raped by federal prison guards. The so-called "law enforcement proviso" of the Federal Tort Claims Act allowed the petitioner to sue the federal government for the guards' conduct.
Marshall v. Rodgers	12-382	2013-04-01	The petitioner, convicted in state court of gun-related crimes, claimed the courts had violated his Sixth Amendment right to counsel by declining to appoint him a lawyer to assist him in filing a motion for a new trial, though he had waived this right three times already. The Ninth Circuit agreed with the petitioner, but the Supreme Court reversed and remanded.
Genesis Healthcare Corp. v. Symczyk	11-1059	2013-04-16	A nurse brought a collective action against her former employer for violating the Fair Labor Standards Act. The employer offered the nurse a settlement under Rule 68 for her own damages, but not those of other potential class members. The Supreme Court held that the offer mooted her claim.
US Airways, Inc. v. McCutchen	11-1285	2013-04-16	The terms of an ERISA plan governed when an ERISA claim was brought under the statutory provision authorizing "appropriate equitable relief . . . to enforce . . . the terms of the" plan. But when there are gaps in the plan, equitable doctrines may be used to construe it.
Kiobel v. Royal Dutch Petroleum Co.	10-1491	2013-04-17	The Court unanimously agreed (albeit for different reasons) that the Alien Tort Statute did not allow a foreign citizen to sue a foreign corporation in an American court for aiding and abetting the commission of human rights abuses on foreign soil.
Missouri v. McNeely	11-1425	2013-04-17	In drunk-driving investigations, the natural dissipation of alcohol in the bloodstream does not constitute an exigency in every case sufficient to justify conducting a blood test without a warrant.
Moncrieffe v. Holder	11-702	2013-04-23	If a noncitizen's conviction for a marijuana distribution offense fails to establish that the offense involved either payment or more than a small amount of marijuana, it is not an aggravated felony under the Immigration and Nationality Act.
McBurney v. Young	12-17	2013-04-29	Virginia's Freedom of Information Act, which grants Virginia citizens access to all public records, but grants no such right to non-Virginians, violates neither the Privileges and Immunities Clause nor the Commerce Clause of the United States Constitution.
Boyer v. Louisiana	11-9953	2013-04-29	A majority of the Supreme Court dismissed this writ of certiorari as "improvidently granted." The question presented had been: Under the Sixth Amendment's speedy trial guarantee, if delay in a criminal defendant's trial is caused by inadequate state funding for indigent defense counsel, should that delay be counted against the State? Because this case was dismissed, the answer (from Vermont v. Brillion) remains "yes, but not much."
Association for Molecular Pathology v. Myriad Genetics	12-398	2013-06-13	The Court held in favor of Petitioners, that naturally occurring sequences of DNA cannot be patented, however artificially created "cDNA" is patent eligible.
Fisher v. University of Texas	11-345	2013-06-24	The Fifth Circuit failed to apply strict scrutiny when it affirmed the University of Texas's affirmative action policy. The decision is vacated and the case is remanded for further consideration.
United States v. Windsor	12-307	2013-06-26	Section 3 of the Defense of Marriage Act is unconstitutional, as it violates due process and equal protection.
Hollingsworth v. Perry	12-144	2013-06-26	The Court held that the Petitioners did not have standing in the matter under Article III, § 2 of the Constitution. The decision of the circuit court is vacated and the case is remanded to the Ninth Circuit under instructions that the appeal be dismissed.

== Roberts Court 2013 term ==
The 2013 term began October 7, 2013, and concluded October 5, 2014. Notable cases included the following:

Case name	Opinion	Decided	Summary
McCutcheon v. FEC	572 U.S. 185 (2014)	2014-04-02	Limits on the total amounts of money that individuals can donate to political campaigns during two-year election cycles violate the First Amendment.
Schuette v. Coalition to Defend Affirmative Action	572 U.S. 291 (2014)	2014-04-22	The Michigan Civil Rights Initiative, a Michigan state constitutional amendment that bans affirmative action, does not violate the Equal Protection Clause.
Town of Greece v. Galloway	572 U.S. 565 (2014)	2014-05-05	A town council's practice of opening its sessions with a sectarian prayer does not violate the Establishment Clause.
Riley v. California	573 U.S. 373 (2014)	2014-06-25	Police must obtain a warrant in order to search digital information on a cell phone seized from an individual who has been arrested.
Burwell v. Hobby Lobby Stores, Inc.	573 U.S. 682 (2014)	2014-06-30	Closely held, for-profit corporations have free exercise rights under the Religious Freedom Restoration Act of 1993. As applied to such corporations, the requirement of the Patient Protection and Affordable Care Act that employers provide their female employees with no-cost access to contraception violates the Religious Freedom Restoration Act.

== Roberts Court 2014 term ==
The 2014 term began October 6, 2014, and concluded October 4, 2015. Notable cases included the following:

Case name	Opinion	Decided	Summary
Obergefell v. Hodges	14-556	2015-06-26	The Fourteenth Amendment requires a state to license a marriage between two people of the same sex with all the accompanying rights and responsibilities and to recognize a marriage between two people of the same sex when their marriage was lawfully licensed and performed out-of-state.
Michigan v. EPA	14-46	2015-06-29	The Environmental Protection Agency must consider costs when it regulates power plants under the Clean Air Act.
Glossip v. Gross	14-7955	2015-06-29	The Eighth Amendment requires prisoners to show 1.) there is a known and available alternative method of execution and 2.) the challenged method of execution poses a demonstrated risk of severe pain, with the burden of proof resting on the prisoners, not the state.

== Roberts Court 2015 term ==
The 2015 term began October 5, 2015, and concluded October 2, 2016. Notable cases included the following:

Case name	Opinion	Decided	Summary
Whole Woman's Health v. Hellerstedt	15-274	2016-06-27	A Texas law that requires abortion providers to have admitting privileges at a hospital within 30 miles and to meet the same standards as ambulatory surgical centers places a substantial obstacle in the path of a woman seeking a pre-viability abortion, constitutes an undue burden on abortion access, and thus violates the Constitution. Overruled by Dobbs v. Jackson Women's Health Organization in 2022.

== Roberts Court 2016 term ==
The 2016 term began October 3, 2016, and concluded October 1, 2017. Notable cases included the following:

Case name	Opinion	Decided	Summary
Cooper v. Harris	15-1262	2017-05-22	North Carolina relied too heavily on race in redrawing two congressional districts following the 2010 Census.

== Roberts Court 2017 term ==
The 2017 term began October 2, 2017, and concluded September 30, 2018. Notable cases included the following:

Case name	Opinion	Decided	Summary
Murphy v. National Collegiate Athletic Association	16-476	2018-05-14	The Professional and Amateur Sports Protection Act of 1992 violates the Tenth Amendment because it prohibits the states from passing laws that authorize and regulate sports betting.
Masterpiece Cakeshop v. Colorado Civil Rights Commission	16-111	2018-06-04	By failing to act in a manner neutral to religion the Colorado Civil Rights Commission's actions in assessing a cakeshop owner's reasons for declining to make a cake for a same-sex couple's wedding celebration violated the Free Exercise Clause.
Minnesota Voters Alliance v. Mansky	16-1435	2018-06-14	A law banning politically motivated apparel and accessories inside polling places is overbroad and violates the First Amendment.
Carpenter v. United States	16-402	2018-06-22	Government acquisition of cell-site records is a Fourth Amendment search, and thus generally requires a warrant.
Trump v. Hawaii	17-965	2018-06-26	Presidential Proclamation 9645 did not violate the Immigration and Nationality Act or the Establishment Clause by suspending the entry of aliens from several nations. Substantial deference must be accorded to the Executive in the conduct of foreign affairs and the exclusion of aliens.
Janus v. AFSCME	16-1466	2018-06-27	No public sector employee, having refused membership in a trade union, may be compelled to pay union dues to said union because of the benefits he may receive from their collective bargaining. "Fair share" agreements, when applied to public sector workers, violate the First Amendment protections of free association and freedom of speech.

== Roberts Court 2018 term ==
The 2018 term began October 1, 2018, and concluded October 6, 2019. Notable cases included the following:

Case name	Opinion	Decided	Summary
Bucklew v. Precythe	17-8151	2019-04-01	Baze v. Rees and Glossip v. Gross govern all Eighth Amendment challenges alleging that a method of execution inflicts unconstitutionally cruel pain. When a convict sentenced to death challenges the State's method of execution due to claims of excessive pain, the convict must show that other alternative methods of execution exist and clearly demonstrate they would cause less pain than the state-determined one.
Herrera v. Wyoming	17-532	2019-05-20	Wyoming's statehood did not void the Crow Tribe's right to hunt on "unoccupied lands of the United States" under an 1868 treaty, and that the Bighorn National Forest did not automatically become "occupied" when the forest was created.
American Legion v. American Humanist Association	17-1717	2019-06-20	A war memorial Latin cross displayed on public land does not violate the Establishment Clause, because longstanding monuments should be afforded a presumption of constitutionality.
Rucho v. Common Cause	18-422	2019-06-27	Partisan gerrymandering claims present political questions beyond the reach of the federal courts.

== Roberts Court 2019 term ==
The 2019 term began October 7, 2019, and concluded October 4, 2020. Notable cases included the following:

Case name	Opinion	Decided	Summary
Kahler v. Kansas	18-6135	2020-03-23	The Due Process Clause does not necessarily compel the acquittal of any defendant who, because of mental illness, could not tell right from wrong when committing their crime.
Ramos v. Louisiana	18-5924	2020-04-20	The Sixth Amendment right to jury trial is read as requiring a unanimous verdict to convict a defendant of a serious offense and is an incorporated right to the states overruling Apodaca v. Oregon.
Bostock v. Clayton County	17-1618	2020-06-15	Title VII of the Civil Rights Act of 1964 protects employees against discrimination due to their sexual orientation or gender identity.
Espinoza v. Montana Department of Revenue	18-1195	2020-06-30	A state's "no aid" constitutional provision prohibiting state aid to religious schools violates the Free Exercise Clause by explicitly discriminating against institutions on the basis of religion.
Chiafalo v. Washington	19-465	2020-07-06	States have the ability to require presidential electors to vote for the candidate who wins the state's popular vote and to remove and/or punish electors who violate pledges to that effect.
McGirt v. Oklahoma	18-9526	2020-07-09	Oklahoma's land reserved for the Creek Nation since the 19th century remains "Indian country". Native Americans residing in the reservation cannot be criminally prosecuted by the state of Oklahoma.
Sharp v. Murphy	17-1107	2020-07-09	For Major Crimes Act purposes, land reserved for the Creek Nation since the 19th century remains "Indian country". Reaffirms McGirt v. Oklahoma.
Trump v. Mazars USA, LLP	19-715	2020-07-09	The Court laid out a four-factor balancing test that lower courts must weigh before determining if congressional subpoenas involving the President and his papers are valid.
Trump v. Vance	19-635	2020-07-09	Article II and the Supremacy Clause do not categorically preclude, or require a heightened standard for, the issuance of a state criminal subpoena to a sitting president.

== Roberts Court 2020 term ==
The 2020 term began October 5, 2020, and concluded October 3, 2021. Notable cases included the following:

Case name	Opinion	Decided	Summary
United States v. Cooley	19-1414	2021-06-01	Native American tribal governments and police have the power to search and detain non-Native individuals suspected of violating state or federal laws on tribal lands.
Fulton v. City of Philadelphia	19-123	2021-06-17	The refusal of Philadelphia to contract with the Catholic Social Services of the Archdiocese of Philadelphia for the provision of foster care services unless Catholic Social Services agrees to certify same-sex couples as foster parents violates the Free Exercise Clause.
Brnovich v. Democratic National Committee	19-1257	2021-07-01	Arizona's voting restrictions regarding provisional ballot counting do not violate Section 2 of the Voting Rights Act.

== Roberts Court 2021 term ==
The 2021 term began October 4, 2021, and concluded on October 2, 2022. The Supreme Court decided the following cases:

Case name	Opinion	Decided	Summary
Rivas-Villegas v. Cortesluna	20-1539	2021-10-18	Officer Rivas-Villegas is entitled to qualified immunity in this excessive force action brought under 42 U.S.C. §1983; the Ninth Circuit’s holding that Circuit precedent “put him on notice that his conduct constituted excessive force” is reversed.
City of Tahlequah v. Bond	20-1668	2021-10-18	Officers Girdner and Vick are entitled to qualified immunity in this excessive force action brought under 42 U.S.C. §1983; the Tenth Circuit’s contrary holding is not based on a single precedent finding a Fourth Amendment violation under similar circumstances.
Mississippi v. Tennessee	143, Orig.	2021-11-22	The waters of the Middle Claiborne Aquifer are subject to the judicial remedy of equitable apportionment; Mississippi’s complaint is dismissed without leave to amend.
Whole Woman’s Health v. Jackson	21-463	2021-12-10	A pre-enforcement challenge under the Federal Constitution to Texas Senate Bill 8—the Texas Heartbeat Act—may proceed past the motion to dismiss stage against certain of the named defendants but not others; the order of the District Court is affirmed in part and reversed in part, and the case is remanded.
United States v. Texas	21-588	2021-12-10	The writ of certiorari is dismissed as improvidently granted and the application to vacate stay presented to Justice Alito and by him referred to the Court is denied.
Babcock v. Kijakazi	20-480	2022-1-13	Civil-service pension payments based on employment as a dual-status military technician are not payments based on “service as a member of a uniformed service” under 42 U.S.C. §415(a)(7)(A)(III).
Biden v. Missouri	21A240	2022-1-13	The Court grants the applications to stay the two injunctions barring the Secretary of Health and Human Services’ regulation requiring facilities that participate in Medicare and Medicaid to ensure that their employees are vaccinated against COVID-19.
National Federation of Independent Business v. Department of Labor, Occupational Safety and Health Administration	21A244	2022-1-13	The Court grants the applications to stay the Occupational Safety & Health Administration’s challenged rule mandating that employers with at least 100 employees require covered workers to receive a COVID-19 vaccine.
Hemphill v. New York	20-637	2022-1-20	The trial court’s admission—over Hemphill’s objection—of the plea allocution transcript of an unavailable witness violated Hemphill’s Sixth Amendment right to confront the witnesses against him.
Hughes v. Northwestern University	19-1401	2022-1-24	Determining whether plan participants state plausible claims against plan fiduciaries for violations of ERISA’s duty of prudence requires a context-specific inquiry of the fiduciaries’ continuing duty to monitor investments and to remove imprudent ones as articulated in Tibble v. Edison Int’l, 575 U.S. 523; the Seventh Circuit erred in relying on the participants’ ultimate choice over their investments to excuse allegedly imprudent decisions by respondents.
Unicolors, Inc. v. H&M Hennes & Mauritz, LP	20-915	2022-2-24	Lack of either factual or legal knowledge can excuse an inaccuracy in a copyright registration under 17 U.S.C. §411(b)(1)(A)’s safe harbor.
United States v. Zubaydah	20-827	2022-3-3	The Ninth Circuit’s judgment that the District Court erred in dismissing Zubaydah’s discovery request on the basis of the state secrets privilege is reversed, and the case is remanded with instructions to dismiss Zubaydah’s current discovery application.
Cameron v. EMW Women's Surgical Center, P.S.C.	20-601	2022-3-3	The Court of Appeals erred in denying the Kentucky attorney general’s motion to intervene on the Commonwealth’s behalf in litigation concerning Kentucky House Bill 454.
United States v. Tsarnaev	20-443	2022-3-4	The judgment of the Court of Appeals vacating Tsarnaev's capital sentences is reversed.
FBI v. Fazaga	20-828	2022-3-4	Section 1806(f) of the Foreign Intelligence Surveillance Act of 1978—providing a procedure under which a trial-level court or other authority may consider the legality of electronic surveillance conducted under FISA and order specified forms of relief—does not displace the state secrets privilege.
Wooden v. United States	20-5279	2022-3-7	Wooden’s ten burglary offenses arising from a single criminal episode did not occur on different “occasions” and thus count as only one prior conviction under the Armed Career Criminal Act.
Wisconsin Legislature v. Wisconsin Elections Commission	21A471	2022-3-23	In adopting the Wisconsin Governor’s proposed redistricting plan, which increases the number of majority-Black Assembly districts, the Wisconsin Supreme Court committed legal error by failing to properly apply strict scrutiny to determine whether the State’s race-based sorting of voters is narrowly tailored to comply with the Voting Rights Act. See Cooper v. Harris, 581 U.S. ___.
Ramirez v. Collier	21-5592	2022-3-24	Petitioner Ramirez is likely to succeed on his claims under the Religious Land Use and Institutionalized Persons Act of 2000 because Texas’s restrictions on religious touch and audible prayer in the execution chamber burden religious exercise and are not the least restrictive means of furthering the State’s compelling interests.
Houston Community College System v. Wilson	20-804	2022-3-24	Respondent Wilson does not possess an actionable First Amendment claim arising from his purely verbal censure by the Board of Trustees of the Houston Community College System.
Badgerow v. Walters	20-1143	2022-3-31	Federal jurisdiction in a petition to compel arbitration under Section 4 of the Federal Arbitration Act is determined by “looking through” the petition to the jurisdictional basis of the “underlying substantive controversy,” Vaden v. Discover Bank, 556 U.S. 49, 62, but that approach does not apply to petitions to confirm or vacate arbitral awards under Sections 9 and 10 of the FAA.
Thompson v. Clark	20-659	2022-4-4	Petitioner Thompson’s showing that his criminal prosecution ended without a conviction satisfies the requirement to demonstrate a favorable termination of a criminal prosecution in a Fourth Amendment claim under 42 U.S.C. §1983 for malicious prosecution; an affirmative indication of innocence is not needed.
City of Austin v. Reagan National Advertising of Austin, LLC	20-1029	2022-4-21	The distinction between on-premises signs and off-premises signs in the City of Austin’s sign code is facially content neutral under the First Amendment.
Cassirer v. Thyssen-Bornemisza Collection Foundation	20-1566	2022-4-21	In a suit raising non-federal claims against a foreign state or instrumentality under the Foreign Sovereign Immunities Act of 1976, a court should determine the substantive law by using the same choice-of-law rule applicable in a similar suit against a private party.
Brown v. Davenport	20-826	2022-4-21	When a state court has ruled on the merits of a state prisoner’s claim, a federal court cannot grant habeas relief without applying both the test this Court outlined in Brecht v. Abrahamson, 507 U.S. 619, and the one Congress prescribed in the Antiterrorism and Effective Death Penalty Act of 1996; the Sixth Circuit erred in granting habeas relief to Mr. Davenport based solely on its assessment that he could satisfy the Brecht standard.
United States v. Vaello Madero	20-303	2022-4-21	The Constitution does not require Congress to make Supplemental Security Income benefits available to residents of Puerto Rico.
Boechler v. Commissioner	20-1472	2022-4-21	The 30-day time limit to file a petition for review of a collection due process determination, 26 U.S.C. §6330(d)(1), is a nonjurisdictional deadline subject to equitable tolling.
Cummings v. Premier Rehab Keller	20-1472	2022-4-28	Emotional distress damages are not recoverable in a private action to enforce either the Rehabilitation Act of 1973 or the Affordable Care Act.
LeDure v. Union Pacific Railroad Co.	20-807	2022-4-28	Judgment affirmed by an equally divided Court.
Shurtleff v. Boston	20-1800	2022-5-2	Because Boston’s flag-raising program did not constitute government speech, Boston’s refusal to let petitioners fly their flag violated the Free Speech Clause of the First Amendment.
FEC v. Ted Cruz for Senate	20-979	2022-5-16	Section 304 of the Bipartisan Campaign Reform Act of 2002—which limits the amount of post-election contributions that may be used to repay a candidate who lends money to his own campaign—unconstitutionally burdens core political speech.
Patel v. Garland	20-979	2022-5-16	Federal courts lack jurisdiction to review facts found as part of any judgment relating to the granting of discretionary-relief in immigration proceedings enumerated under 8 U.S.C. §1252(a)(2)(B)(i).
Shinn v. Ramirez	20-1009	2022-5-23	Under 28 U.S.C. §2254(e)(2), a federal habeas court may not conduct an evidentiary hearing or otherwise consider evidence beyond the state-court record based on the ineffective assistance of state postconviction counsel.
Morgan v. Sundance, Inc.	21-328	2022-5-23	Federal courts may not adopt an arbitration-specific rule conditioning a waiver of the right to arbitrate on a showing of prejudice.
Gallardo v. Marstiller	20-1263	2022-6-6	The Medicaid Act permits a State to seek reimbursement from settlement payments allocated for future medical care.
Southwest Airlines Co. v. Saxon	21-309	2022-6-6	Airplane cargo loaders and ramp supervisors who, like petitioner Saxon, frequently load and unload airplane cargo belong to a “class of workers engaged in foreign or interstate commerce” exempt from the Federal Arbitration Act’s coverage.
Siegel v. Fitzgerald	21-441	2022-6-6	Congress’ enactment of a significant fee increase that exempted debtors in two States violated the uniformity requirement of the Bankruptcy Clause.
Egbert v. Boule	21-147	2022-06-08	The authority of a court to imply a cause of action under Bivens v. Six Unknown Fed. Narcotics Agents, 403 U.S. 388, does not extend to either Boule’s Fourth Amendment excessive-force claim or his First Amendment retaliation claim.
Kemp v. United States	21-5726	2022-6-13	The term “mistake” in Federal Rule of Civil Procedure 60(b)(1) includes a judge’s errors of law; because Kemp’s motion alleged such an error, it was cognizable under Rule 60(b)(1) and untimely under Rule 60(c)’s 1-year limitations period.
Garland v. Gonzalez	20-322	2022-6-13	Title 8 U.S.C. §1252(f)(1)—which generally strips lower courts of “jurisdiction or authority” to “enjoin or restrain the operation of” certain provisions of the Immigration and Nationality Act—deprived the District Courts of jurisdiction in these cases to entertain respondents’ requests for class-wide injunctive relief.
Johnson v. Arteaga-Martinez	19-896	2022-6-13	Title 8 U.S.C. §1231(a)(6) does not require the Government to provide noncitizens detained for six months with bond hearings in which the Government bears the burden of proving, by clear and convincing evidence, that a noncitizen poses a flight risk or a danger to the community.
Denezpi v. United States	20-7622	2022-6-13	The Double Jeopardy Clause does not bar successive prosecutions of distinct offenses arising from a single act, even if a single sovereign prosecutes them.
ZF Automotive U. S., Inc. v. Luxshare, Ltd.	21-401	2022-6-13	Although 28 U.S.C. §1782(a) permits a district court to order discovery “for use in a proceeding in a foreign or international tribunal,” only a governmental or intergovernmental adjudicative body may qualify as such a tribunal, and the arbitration panels in these cases are not such adjudicative bodies.
Viking River Cruises, Inc. v. Moriana	20-1573	2022-6-15	The Federal Arbitration Act preempts a rule of California law that invalidates contractual waivers of the right to assert representative claims under “PAGA”—California’s Labor Code Private Attorneys General Act of 2004—insofar as that rule precludes division of PAGA actions into individual and non-individual claims through an agreement to arbitrate.
Golan v. Saada	20-1034	2022-6-15	A court is not categorically required to examine all possible ameliorative measures before denying a Hague Convention petition for return of a child to a foreign country once the court has found that return would expose the child to a grave risk of harm.
Ysleta del Sur Pueblo v. Texas	20-493	2022-6-15	The federal legislation at issue—the Ysleta del Sur and Alabama and Coushatta Indian Tribes of Texas Restoration Act, 101 Stat. 666—bans as a matter of federal law on tribal lands only those gaming activities also banned in Texas.
American Hospital Association v. Becerra	20-1114	2022-6-15	The Medicare Prescription Drug, Improvement, and Modernization Act of 2003 does not preclude judicial review of the reimbursement rates set by the Department of Health and Human Services for certain outpatient prescription drugs that hospitals provide to Medicare patients; in this case, because HHS did not conduct a survey of hospitals’ acquisition costs in 2018 and 2019, its decision to vary reimbursement rates only for 340B hospitals in those years was unlawful.
George v. McDonough	21-234	2022-6-15	The invalidation of a Department of Veterans Affairs regulation after a veteran’s benefits decision becomes final cannot support a claim for collateral relief permitting revision of that decision based on “clear and unmistakable error” under 38 U.S.C. §§5109A and 7111.
Arizona v. City and County of San Francisco	20-1775	2022-6-15	The writ of certiorari is dismissed as improvidently granted.
Carson v. Makin	20-1088	2022-06-21	Maine’s “nonsectarian” requirement for otherwise generally available tuition assistance payments to parents who live in school districts that do not operate a secondary school of their own violates the Free Exercise Clause of the First Amendment.
Shoop v. Twyford	21-511	2022-6-21	A transportation order that allows a prisoner to search for new evidence—in this case an order compelling the State to transport Mr. Twyford to a medical facility for neurological testing—is not “necessary or appropriate in aid of” a federal court’s adjudication of a habeas corpus action when the prisoner has not shown that the desired evidence would be admissible in connection with a particular claim for relief.
United States v. Washington	21-404	2022-6-21	Washington’s workers’ compensation law is unconstitutional under the Supremacy Clause because it facially discriminates against the Federal Government and does not fall within the scope of the federal waiver of immunity contained in 40 U.S.C. §3172.
United States v. Taylor	20-1459	2022-6-21	Attempted Hobbs Act robbery does not qualify as a “crime of violence” under 18 U.S.C. §924(c)(3)(A) because no element of the offense requires proof that the defendant used, attempted to use, or threatened to use force.
Marietta Memorial Hospital Employee Health Benefit Plan v. DaVita Inc.	20-1641	2022-6-21	The Medicare Secondary Payer statute does not authorize disparate-impact liability, and the Marietta Plan’s coverage terms for outpatient dialysis do not violate 42 U.S.C. §1395y(b)(1)(C) because those terms apply uniformly to all covered individuals.
New York State Rifle & Pistol Association, Inc. v. Bruen	20-843	2022-06-23	New York’s proper-cause requirement for obtaining an unrestricted license to carry a concealed firearm violates the Fourteenth Amendment in that it prevents law-abiding citizens with ordinary self-defense needs from exercising their Second Amendment right to keep and bear arms.
Vega v. Tekoh	21-499	2022-6-23	A violation of the prophylactic rules described in Miranda v. Arizona, 384 U.S. 436, does not provide a basis for a claim under 42 U.S.C. §1983.
Nance v. Ward	21-439	2022-6-23	Title 42 U.S.C. §1983 is the procedural vehicle appropriate for a prisoner’s method-of-execution claim even if an order granting the relief requested would necessitate a change in state law.
Berger v. North Carolina State Conference of the NAACP	21-248	2022-6-23	The speaker of the North Carolina State House of Representatives and the president pro tempore of the North Carolina State Senate are entitled to intervene in this litigation challenging North Carolina’s voter-ID law.
Dobbs v. Jackson Women's Health Organization	19-1392	2022-06-24	The Constitution does not confer a right to abortion; Roe v. Wade, 410 U.S. 113, and Planned Parenthood of Southeastern Pa. v. Casey, 505 U.S. 833, are overruled; the authority to regulate abortion is returned to the people and their elected representatives.
Becerra v. Empire Health Foundation	20-1312	2022-6-24	For purposes of calculating the Medicare fraction—one of two fractions the Medicare program uses to adjust the rates paid to hospitals that serve a higher-than-usual percentage of low-income patients—those individuals “entitled to [Medicare Part A] benefits” are all those qualifying for the program, regardless of whether they receive Medicare payments for part or all of a hospital stay.
Ruan v. United States	20-1410	2022-6-27	For the crime of prescribing controlled substances outside the usual course of professional practice in violation of 21 U.S.C. §841, the mens rea “knowingly or intentionally” applies to the statute’s “except as authorized” clause.
Concepcion v. United States	20-1650	2022-6-27	Section 404(b) of the First Step Act of 2018, 132 Stat. 5222, allows district courts to consider intervening changes of law or fact in exercising their discretion to reduce a sentence.
Kennedy v. Bremerton School District	21-418	2022-06-27	The government, while following the Establishment Clause, may not suppress an individual from engaging in personal religious observance, as doing so would violate the Free Speech and Free Exercise Clauses of the First Amendment.
Torres v. Texas Department of Public Safety	20-603	2022-6-29	By ratifying the Constitution, the States agreed their sovereignty would yield to the national power to raise and support the Armed Forces; Congress may exercise this power to authorize private damages suits against nonconsenting States, as in the Uniformed Services Employment and Reemployment Rights Act of 1994.
Oklahoma v. Castro-Huerta	21-429	2022-6-29	The Federal Government and the State have concurrent jurisdiction to prosecute crimes committed by non-Indians against Indians in Indian country.
West Virginia v. EPA	20-1530	2022-06-30	Congress did not grant the Environmental Protection Agency in Section 111(d) of the Clean Air Act the authority to devise emissions caps based on the generation shifting approach the Agency took in the Clean Power Plan.
Biden v. Texas	21-954	2022-06-30	The Government’s rescission of Migrant Protection Protocols did not violate section 1225 of the Immigration and Nationality Act, and the then-Secretary of Homeland Security’s October 29 Memoranda constituted valid final agency action.

== Roberts Court 2022 term ==
The 2022 term began on October 3, 2022, and concluded on October 1, 2023. Cases included the following:

Case name	Opinion	Decided	Summary
Arellano v. McDonough	21-432	2023-1-23	The effective date of an award of service-related disability compensation to a veteran of the United States military determined pursuant to 38 U.S.C. §§5110(a)(1) and 5110(b)(1) is not subject to equitable tolling.
In re Grand Jury	21-1397	2023-1-23	Certiorari dismissed as improvidently granted.
Cruz v. Arizona	21-846	2023-2-22	The Arizona Supreme Court’s holding below—that Lynch v. Arizona, 578 U.S. 613, did not represent a “significant change in the law” for purposes of permitting Cruz to file a successive petition for state postconviction relief under Arizona Rule of Criminal Procedure 32.1(g)—is not an adequate state-law ground supporting that judgment.
Helix Energy Solutions Group, Inc. v. Hewitt	21-984	2023-2-22	Respondent Hewitt was not an executive exempt from the FLSA’s overtime pay guarantee; daily-rate workers, of whatever income level, qualify as paid on a salary basis only if the conditions set out in 29 CFR §541.604(b) are met.
Bartenwerfer v. Buckley	21-908	2023-2-22	Pursuant to §523(a)(2)(A) of the Bankruptcy Code, a debtor like Kate Bartenwerfer who is liable for her partner’s fraud cannot discharge that debt in bankruptcy, regardless of her own culpability.
Bittner v. United States	21-1195	2023-2-28	The Bank Secrecy Act’s $10,000 maximum penalty for the nonwillful failure to file a compliant report (FBAR) accrues on a per-report, not a per-account, basis.
Delaware v. Pennsylvania	22O145	2023-2-28	Unclaimed MoneyGram payments constitute "money orders" or "similar written instruments" subject to escheatment under the Federal Disposition Act, 12 U.S.C. § 2503.
Perez v. Sturgis Public Schools	21-887	2023-3-21	An Americans with Disabilities Act lawsuit seeking compensatory damages for the denial of a free and appropriate education (FAPE) may proceed without exhausting the administrative processes of the Individuals with Disabilities Education Act, 20 U.S.C. §1415(l), because the remedy sought is not one IDEA provides.
Wilkins v. United States	21-1164	2023-3-28	The Quiet Title Act’s 12-year statute of limitations, 28 U.S.C. § 2409a(g), is a nonjurisdictional claims-processing rule (making it subject, for example, to waiver and potentially equitable tolling and estoppel).
Axon Enterprise, Inc. v. Federal Trade Commission	21-86	2023-4-14	The statutory review schemes set out in the Securities Exchange Act and Federal Trade Commission Act do not displace a district court’s federal question jurisdiction over claims challenging as unconstitutional the structure or existence of the Securities and Exchange Commission (SEC) or the Federal Trade Commission (FTC).
New York v. New Jersey	22O156	2023-04-18	Notwithstanding opposition by the State of New York, New Jersey may unilaterally withdraw from the 1953 Waterfront Commission Compact.
Andy Warhol Foundation for the Visual Arts, Inc. v. Goldsmith	21-869	2023-5-18	Alterations to an allegedly infringing secondary work must be substantial for work to be considered sufficiently transformative under the first fair use factor where secondary work is used commercially for the same purpose; courts must analyze the specific use of an allegedly infringing work before determining whether it was sufficiently transformative.

== Roberts Court 2023 term ==
The 2023 term began October 2, 2023, and concluded on October 7, 2024. Cases include the following.

Case name	Opinion	Decided	Summary
Trump v. Anderson	23-719	2024-3-4	Only Congress, not the states, can determine eligibility for federal office under Section 3 of the Fourteenth Amendment. Colorado Supreme Court reversed.
Garland v. Cargill	22-976	2024-6-14	The ATF exceeded its statutory authority by issuing a Rule that classifies a bump stock as a "machinegun" under §5845(b).
United States v. Rahimi	22-915	2024-6-21	When an individual has been found by a court to pose a credible threat to the physical safety of another, that individual may be temporarily disarmed consistent with the Second Amendment.

== Roberts Court 2024 term ==
The 2024 term began October 7, 2024, and concluded on October 5, 2025.

== Roberts Court 2025 term ==
The 2025 term began on October 6, 2025, and concluded on October 4, 2026.

== Roberts Court 2026 term ==
The 2026 term began on October 5, 2026.
