= 2012 term opinions of the Supreme Court of the United States =

October 2012 to October 2013 opinions

The 2012 term of the Supreme Court of the United States began October 1, 2012, and concluded October 6, 2013. The table illustrates which opinion was filed by each justice in each case and which justices joined each opinion.

== Table key ==
- Delivered the court's opinion
- Joined the court's opinion
- Filed a concurrence
- Joined a concurrence
- Filed a dissent
- Joined a dissent
- Filed a concurrence/dissent
- Joined a concurrence/dissent
- Did not participate in the decision
- Decisions that do not note an argument date were decided without oral argument. Decisions that do not note a justice delivering the court's opinion are per curiam.
- Multiple concurrences and dissents within a case are numbered, with joining votes numbered accordingly. Justices frequently join multiple opinions in a single case; each vote is subdivided accordingly.
- An asterisk ( * ) in the court's opinion denotes that it was only a majority in part or a plurality. An asterisk in a joining vote denotes that the justice joined it only in part.
- A dash ( - ) denotes that the justice voted without filing or joining an opinion.

== 2012 term opinions ==
#	Case name and citation	Argued	Decided	Roberts	Scalia	Kennedy	Thomas	Ginsburg	Breyer	Alito	Sotomayor	Kagan
1	Lefemine v. Wideman, 568 U.S. 1		November 5, 2012									
2	United States v. Bormes, 568 U.S. 6	October 2, 2012	November 13, 2012									
3	Nitro-Lift Technologies, L. L. C. v. Howard, 568 U.S. 17		November 26, 2012									
4	Arkansas Game and Fish Comm’n v. United States, 568 U.S. 23	October 3, 2012	December 4, 2012									
5	Kloeckner v. Solis, 568 U.S. 41	October 2, 2012	December 10, 2012									
6	Ryan v. Valencia Gonzales, 568 U.S. 57	October 9, 2012	January 8, 2013									
7	L.A. Cty. Flood Control Dist. v. Natural Resources Defense Council, 568 U.S. 78	December 4, 2012	January 8, 2013							-		
8	Already, LLC v. Nike, Inc., 568 U.S. 85	November 7, 2012	January 9, 2013									
9	Smith v. United States, 568 U.S. 106	November 6, 2012	January 9, 2013									
10	Lozman v. City of Riviera Beach, 568 U.S. 115	October 1, 2012	January 15, 2013									
11	Sebelius v. Auburn Regional Medical Center, 568 U.S. 145	December 4, 2012	January 22, 2013									
12	Chafin v. Chafin, 568 U.S. 165	December 5, 2012	February 19, 2013									
13	Bailey v. United States, 568 U.S. 186	November 1, 2012	February 19, 2013									
14	FTC v. Phoebe Putney Health System, Inc., 568 U.S. 216	November 26, 2012	February 19, 2013									
15	Florida v. Harris, 568 U.S. 237	October 31, 2012	February 19, 2013									
16	Gunn v. Minton, 568 U.S. 251	January 16, 2013	February 20, 2013									
17	Henderson v. United States, 568 U.S. 266	November 28, 2012	February 20, 2013									
18	Johnson v. Williams, 568 U.S. 289	October 3, 2012	February 20, 2013									
19	Evans v. Michigan, 568 U.S. 313	November 6, 2012	February 20, 2013									
20	Chaidez v. United States, 568 U.S. 342	November 1, 2012	February 20, 2013									
21	Marx v. General Revenue Corp., 568 U.S. 371	November 7, 2012	February 26, 2013									
22	Clapper v. Amnesty International USA, 568 U.S. 398	October 29, 2012	February 26, 2013									
23	Gabelli v. SEC, 568 U.S. 442	January 8, 2013	February 27, 2013									
24	Amgen Inc. v. Connecticut Retirement Plans and Trust Funds, 568 U.S. 455	November 5, 2012	February 27, 2013		1 2*	2	2					
25	Levin v. United States, 568 U.S. 503	January 15, 2013	March 4, 2013		*							
26	Kirtsaeng v. John Wiley & Sons, Inc., 568 U.S. 519	October 29, 2012	March 19, 2013		*							
27	Standard Fire Ins. Co. v. Knowles, 568 U.S. 588	January 7, 2013	March 19, 2013									
28	Decker v. Northwest Environmental Defense Center, 568 U.S. 597	December 3, 2012	March 20, 2013		*							
29	Wos v. E. M. A., 568 U.S. 627	January 8, 2013	March 20, 2013									
30	Florida v. Jardines, 569 U.S. 1	October 31, 2012	March 26, 2013									
31	Comcast Corp. v. Behrend, 569 U.S. 27	November 5, 2012	March 27, 2013									
32	Millbrook v. United States, 569 U.S. 50	February 19, 2013	March 27, 2013									
33	Marshall v. Rodgers, 569 U.S. 58		April 1, 2013									
34	Genesis HealthCare Corp. v. Symczyk, 569 U.S. 66	December 3, 2012	April 16, 2013									
35	US Airways, Inc. v. McCutchen, 569 U.S. 88	November 27, 2012	April 16, 2013									
36	Kiobel v. Royal Dutch Petroleum Co., 569 U.S. 108	October 1, 2012	April 17, 2013			1	3	2	2	3	2	2
37	Missouri v. McNeely, 569 U.S. 141	January 9, 2013	April 17, 2013			*					*	
38	Moncrieffe v. Holder, 569 U.S. 184	October 10, 2012	April 23, 2013				1			2		
39	McBurney v. Young, 569 U.S. 221	February 20, 2013	April 29, 2013									
40	Boyer v. Louisiana, 569 U.S. 238	January 14, 2013	April 29, 2013									
41	Dan's City Used Cars, Inc. v. Pelkey, 569 U.S. 251	March 20, 2013	May 13, 2013									
42	Bullock v. BankChampaign, N. A., 569 U.S. 267	March 18, 2013	May 13, 2013									
43	Bowman v. Monsanto Co., 569 U.S. 278	February 19, 2013	May 13, 2013									
44	City of Arlington v. FCC, 569 U.S. 290	January 16, 2013	May 20, 2013									
45	PPL Corp. v. Commissioner, 569 U.S. 329	February 20, 2013	May 20, 2013									
46	Metrish v. Lancaster, 569 U.S. 351	April 24, 2013	May 20, 2013									
47	Sebelius v. Cloer, 569 U.S. 369	March 19, 2013	May 20, 2013		*		*					
48	McQuiggin v. Perkins, 569 U.S. 383	February 25, 2013	May 28, 2013							*		
49	Trevino v. Thaler, 569 U.S. 413	February 25, 2013	May 28, 2013	1	2		2			1		
50	Maryland v. King, 569 U.S. 435	February 26, 2013	June 3, 2013									
51	Hillman v. Maretta, 569 U.S. 483	April 22, 2013	June 3, 2013		*		1			2		
52	Nevada v. Jackson, 569 U.S. 505		June 3, 2013									
53	Horne v. Department of Agriculture, 569 U.S. 513	March 20, 2013	June 10, 2013									
54	Peugh v. United States, 569 U.S. 530	February 26, 2013	June 10, 2013	1*	1* 2	*	1			1* 2	*	
55	Oxford Health Plans LLC v. Sutter, 569 U.S. 564	March 25, 2013	June 10, 2013									
56	Association for Molecular Pathology v. Myriad Genetics, Inc., 569 U.S. 576	April 15, 2013	June 13, 2013		*							
57	United States v. Davila, 569 U.S. 597	April 15, 2013	June 13, 2013									
58	Tarrant Regional Water Dist. v. Herrmann, 569 U.S. 614	April 23, 2013	June 13, 2013									
59	American Trucking Assns., Inc. v. Los Angeles, 569 U.S. 641	April 16, 2013	June 13, 2013									
60	Arizona v. Inter Tribal Council of Ariz., Inc., 570 U.S. 1	March 18, 2013	June 17, 2013			*	1			2		
61	Maracich v. Spears, 570 U.S. 48	January 9, 2013	June 17, 2013									
62	Alleyne v. United States, 570 U.S. 99	January 14, 2013	June 17, 2013	1	1	1	*	2	* 1	2	2	2
63	FTC v. Actavis, Inc., 570 U.S. 136	March 25, 2013	June 17, 2013									
64	Salinas v. Texas, 570 U.S. 178	April 17, 2013	June 17, 2013							*		
65	Agency for Int'l Development v. Alliance for Open Society Int'l, Inc., 570 U.S. 205	April 22, 2013	June 20, 2013									
66	American Express Co. v. Italian Colors Restaurant, 570 U.S. 228	February 27, 2013	June 20, 2013									
67	Descamps v. United States, 570 U.S. 254	January 7, 2013	June 20, 2013			1	2					
68	Fisher v. University of Texas at Austin, 570 U.S. 297	October 10, 2012	June 24, 2013		1		2					
69	University of Tex. Southwestern Medical Center v. Nassar, 570 U.S. 338	April 24, 2013	June 24, 2013									
70	United States v. Kebodeaux, 570 U.S. 387	April 17, 2013	June 24, 2013	1	1 2*		2			2		
71	Vance v. Ball State University, 570 U.S. 421	November 26, 2012	June 24, 2013									
72	Mutual Pharmaceutical Co. v. Bartlett, 570 U.S. 472	March 19, 2013	June 24, 2013					2	1		2	1
73	Ryan v. Schad, 570 U.S. 521		June 24, 2013									
74	Shelby County v. Holder, 570 U.S. 529	February 27, 2013	June 25, 2013									
75	Koontz v. St. Johns River Water Management Dist., 570 U.S. 595	January 15, 2013	June 25, 2013									
76	Adoptive Couple v. Baby Girl, 570 U.S. 637	April 16, 2013	June 25, 2013		1 2*		1	2	2		2	2
77	Hollingsworth v. Perry, 570 U.S. 693	March 26, 2013	June 26, 2013									
78	Sekhar v. United States, 570 U.S. 729	April 23, 2013	June 26, 2013									
79	United States v. Windsor, 570 U.S. 744	March 27, 2013	June 26, 2013	1 2*	2		2 3*			3		
#	Case name and citation	Argued	Decided	Roberts	Scalia	Kennedy	Thomas	Ginsburg	Breyer	Alito	Sotomayor	Kagan

== 2012 term membership and statistics ==
This was the eighth term of Chief Justice Roberts's tenure and the third term with the same membership.

Justice		Appointment history		Agreement with judgment		Opinions filed				
Seniority	Name	President	Date confirmed	%	#					Total
Chief Justice	John Roberts	George W. Bush	September 29, 2005	86.1%	68/79	8	2	1	6	17
Associate Justice	Antonin Scalia	Ronald Reagan	September 26, 1986	78.5%	62/79	8	5	1	10	24
Associate Justice	Anthony Kennedy	Ronald Reagan	February 18, 1988	91.1%	72/79	8	5	0	1	14
Associate Justice	Clarence Thomas	George H. W. Bush	October 23, 1991	79.7%	63/79	8	11	0	6	25
Associate Justice	Ruth Bader Ginsburg	Bill Clinton	August 10, 1993	78.5%	62/79	9	1	0	7	17
Associate Justice	Stephen Breyer	Bill Clinton	August 3, 1994	82.1%	64/78	8	5	0	5	18
Associate Justice	Samuel Alito	George W. Bush	January 31, 2006	79.5%	62/78	8	7	0	8	23
Associate Justice	Sonia Sotomayor	Barack Obama	August 6, 2009	78.2%	61/78	8	3	0	6	17
Associate Justice	Elena Kagan	Barack Obama	August 7, 2010	80.3%	61/76	8	2	0	3	13
Notes on statistics: Opinion counts only include the bench opinions listed above; opinions relating to orders or in-chambers opinions are not included.; Agreement with the Court's judgment does not guarantee agreement with the reasoning expressed in its opinion. A justice is not considered in agreement if they dissented even in part. Agreement percentages are based only on the listed cases in which a justice participated and are rounded to the nearest one-tenth of one percentage point.; Individual opinion counts will not match the Court's totals; Ginsburg and Breyer's jointly authored dissent in Comcast Corp. v. Behrend is counted separately for both justices but counted only once in the Court's totals.						Totals				
						73	41	2	51	167
