= Gabelli =

Gabelli is an Italian surname. Notable people with the surname include:

- Giuseppe Gabelli (born 1958), Italian paralympic archer
- Mario Gabelli (born 1942), American stock investor, investment advisor, and financial analyst

== See also ==
- Gabelli School of Business, business faculty of Fordham University
- Gabelli v. SEC, 2013 lawsuit
