= List of United States Supreme Court cases, volume 568 =

This is a list of all the United States Supreme Court cases from volume 568 of the United States Reports:

Case name	Citation	Date decided
Lefemine v. Wideman	568 U.S. 1	2012
The Court ruled that the plaintiff was indeed a "prevailing plaintiff" within the meaning of 42 U.S.C. §1988, "[b]ecause the injunction ordered the defendant officials to change their behavior in a way that directly benefited the plaintiff", and that the plaintiff was therefore entitled to attorney's fees.
United States v. Bormes	568 U.S. 6	2012
The Little Tucker Act does not waive the sovereign immunity of the United States with respect to damages actions for violations of the Fair Credit Reporting Act. Federal Circuit vacated and remanded.
Nitro-Lift Technologies, L.L.C. v. Howard	568 U.S. 17	2012
The U.S. Supreme Court vacated the Oklahoma Supreme Court's ruling that a noncompetition covenant in an employment contract was unenforceable under state law, where the contract as a whole was subject to arbitration. Under the Federal Arbitration Act, the Court wrote, "it is for the arbitrator to decide in the first instance whether the covenants not to compete are valid as a matter of applicable state law."
Ark. Game & Fish Comm'n v. United States	568 U.S. 23	2012
Government-induced recurrent floodings, even if temporary in duration, are not categorically exempt from Takings Clause liability.
Kloeckner v. Solis	568 U.S. 41	2012
A federal employee who claims that an agency action appealable to the Merit Systems Protection Board violates an antidiscrimination statute listed in §7702(a)(1) of the Civil Service Reform Act should seek judicial review in district court, not the Federal Circuit, regardless whether the MSPB decided her case on procedural grounds or on the merits.
Ryan v. Valencia Gonzales	568 U.S. 57	2013
Petitioners need not be competent during federal habeas corpus proceedings.
Los Angeles Cnty. Flood Control Dist. v. Natural Resources Defense Council, Inc.	568 U.S. 78	2013
The flow of water from an improved portion of a navigable waterway into an unimproved portion of the same waterway does not qualify as a "discharge of a pollutant" under the Clean Water Act
Already, LLC v. Nike, Inc.	568 U.S. 85	2013
An unconditional and irrevocable commitment not to enforce a trademark against the defendant in an action moots that action over the defendant's objection that the trademark is invalid.
Smith v. United States	568 U.S. 106	2013
The burden of proof remains on the defendant to prove withdrawal from a conspiracy.
Lozman v. City of Riviera Beach	568 U.S. 115	2013
A vessel is something that a reasonable observer would consider designed for transportation on water. Lozman's floating home was not a vessel.
Sebelius v. Auburn Regional Med. Center	568 U.S. 145	2013
The 180-day statute of limitations for a hospital to appeal a final Medicare reimbursement is not jurisdictional, but it is also not subject to equitable tolling.
Chafin v. Chafin	568 U.S. 165	2013
The appeal of a district court's decision to return a child to his country of residence is not precluded by the child's departure from the United States.
Bailey v. United States	568 U.S. 186	2013
Suspect who had left property in vehicle prior to search was no longer in immediate vicinity when detained almost a mile away, thus no interests of law enforcement justified detention; evidence obtained from suspect that supported conviction was thus unconstitutionally obtained.
FTC v. Phoebe Putney Health System, Inc.	568 U.S. 216	2013
State-action immunity does not apply when the state has not clearly articulated and affirmatively expressed that its plan to enter the market will substantially lessen competition.
Florida v. Harris	568 U.S. 237	2013
If a bona fide organization has certified a dog after testing his reliability in a controlled setting, or if the dog has recently and successfully completed a training program that evaluated his proficiency, a court can presume (subject to any conflicting evidence offered) that the dog's alert provides probable cause to search, using a "totality-of-the-circumstances" approach.
Gunn v. Minton	568 U.S. 251	2013
28 U.S.C. § 1338(a), which provides for exclusive federal jurisdiction over a case "arising under any Act of Congress relating to patents," does not deprive the state courts of subject matter jurisdiction over a state law claim alleging legal malpractice in a patent case.
Henderson v. United States	568 U.S. 266	2013
An error is deemed to be a "plain error" based on the law at the time of the appellate review of the case, not at the time of the trial. It is unreasonable to expect either the defendant or the trial court to predict the outcome of unsettled issues of law, therefore it is the role of the appellate court to review what is considered "plain error" at the time of the appellate review.
Johnson v. Williams	568 U.S. 289	2013
For purposes of AEDPA, when a state court rules against a defendant in an opinion that rejects some of the defendant's claims but does not expressly address a federal claim, a federal habeas court must presume, subject to rebuttal, that the federal claim was adjudicated on the merits.
Evans v. Michigan	568 U.S. 313	2013
The double jeopardy clause bars a retrial when a directed verdict was rendered, even if erroneous.
Chaidez v. United States	568 U.S. 342	2013
Padilla v. Kentucky cannot be used retroactively.
Marx v. Gen. Revenue Corp.	568 U.S. 371	2013
The Fair Debt Collection Practices Act did not modify Federal Rule of Civil Procedure 54(d)(1).
Clapper v. Amnesty Int'l USA	568 U.S. 398	2013
Respondents' claims that they were likely to be targets of surveillance were based too much on speculation and on a predicted chain of events that might never occur, so they lacked Article III standing to challenge FISA Amendments Act of 2008.
Gabelli v. SEC	568 U.S. 442	2013
The statute of limitations for filing civil penalty actions initiates when the offending act is committed.
Amgen Inc. v. Conn. Retirement Plans & Tr. Funds	568 U.S. 455	2013
Proof of materiality is not a prerequisite to certification of a securities-fraud class action.
Levin v. United States	568 U.S. 503	2013
The Gonzalez Act abrogates the FTCA's intentional tort exception and therefore permits a suit against the United States alleging medical battery by a Navy doctor acting within the scope of his employment.
Kirtsaeng v. John Wiley & Sons, Inc.	568 U.S. 519	2013
The first-sale doctrine applies to copies of a copyrighted work lawfully made abroad.
Standard Fire Ins. Co. v. Knowles	568 U.S. 588	2013
A class action plaintiff cannot defeat federal court jurisdiction by stipulating that they will not seek damages above the amount-in-controversy requirement.
Decker v. Nw. Environmental Defense Center	568 U.S. 597	2013
A provision of the Clean Water Act governing challenges to Environmental Protection Agency actions, 33 U.S.C. § 1369(b), does not prohibit a citizen suit under Section 1365 when the suit is against an alleged violator and seeks to enforce an obligation imposed by the CWA or its regulations.
Wos v. E.M.A.	568 U.S. 627	2013
The federal Medicaid statute's anti-lien provision preempts a state's irrebuttable statutory presumption that one-third of a tort recovery is attributable to medical expenses.
