= United States v. Bormes =

- Supreme Court of the United States

Argued October 2, 2012 Decided November 13, 2012
- Full case name: United States v. James X. Bormes
- Docket no.: 11-192
- Citations: 568 U.S. 6 (more) 133 S. Ct. 12; 184 L. Ed. 2d 317; 2012 U.S. LEXIS 8705; 81 U.S.L.W. 4007
- Argument: Oral argument

Case history
- Prior: Motion to dismiss granted, 638 F. Supp. 2d 958 (N.D. Ill. 2009); vacated, 626 F. 3d 574, 578 (Fed. Cir. 2010); cert. granted, 565 U.S. 1153 (2012).

Holding
- The Little Tucker Act does not waive the sovereign immunity of the United States with respect to damages actions for violations of the Fair Credit Reporting Act. Federal Circuit vacated and remanded.

Court membership
- Chief Justice John Roberts Associate Justices Antonin Scalia · Anthony Kennedy; Clarence Thomas · Ruth Bader Ginsburg; Stephen Breyer · Samuel Alito; Sonia Sotomayor · Elena Kagan

Case opinion
- Majority: Scalia, joined by unanimous

Laws applied
- 28 U.S.C. § 1346(a)(2) (Little Tucker Act); 15 U.S.C. § 1681 et seq. (Fair Credit Reporting Act)

United States v. Bormes, 568 U.S. 6 (2012), is a decision by the Supreme Court of the United States holding that the Little Tucker Act, which provides jurisdiction to federal courts for certain claims brought against the federal government, does not apply to lawsuits brought under the Fair Credit Reporting Act (FCRA).

The Court characterized the Little Tucker Act as merely "gap-filling" and, therefore, superseded when a statute authorizing a claim for damages set forth its own specific enforcement procedures, as did the FCRA. Otherwise, the Court believed, the Little Tucker Act would broadly impose a waiver of sovereign immunity under detailed statutes that did not provide for it. The Court directed the lower court to address on remand whether the FCRA itself authorized a claim for damages against the government for violating its provisions.

== Background ==
The issue came before the Court in the context of a lawsuit brought against the U.S. federal government by an attorney, James X. Bormes, who alleged that, after he paid a federal court filing fee online, he received a receipt that violated a provision of the FCRA by including more of his credit card information than was permitted. Bormes filed a putative class action in the United States District Court for the Northern District of Illinois, claiming jurisdiction under both the FCRA and the Little Tucker Act.

The district court dismissed the suit, holding that the FCRA did not waive the federal government's sovereign immunity so as to permit it to be sued under that statute. Bormes appealed to the United States Court of Appeals for the Federal Circuit, claiming jurisdiction under the Little Tucker Act; the federal government moved to transfer the suit to the Seventh Circuit on the basis that the Little Tucker Act did not apply. The Federal Circuit denied the government's motion and vacated the district court's decision, ruling that the Little Tucker Act constituted a waiver of sovereign immunity that was applicable to a claim for damages under the FCRA.

== Opinion of the Court ==
JUSTICE SCALIA: Isn't it really -- doesn't the question come down to as you're putting it whether -- whether the Tucker Act eliminates for all other statutes the presumption against liability on the part of the United States?

MR. SRINIVASAN: It does. I think it does. And I think that's quite a breathtaking proposition, and not one that Congress would have intended by virtue of the Tucker Act...

Oral Argument, Tr: 19:19-20:2.

In a unanimous opinion by Justice Antonin Scalia, the Court vacated the Federal Circuit's decision and ruled that the Little Tucker Act had no applicability to claims brought under the FCRA. Reviewing the history of the Little Tucker Act and its mid-19th century predecessor, and the history of the Court of Claims, the Court observed that the purpose of the Little Tucker Act was to provide judicial remedies for claims against the federal government that were authorized by statute but did not provide a method for enforcement. As such, it is purely a "gap-filling" statute.

The Court, therefore, ruled that the Little Tucker Act's general provisions do not apply when another statute itself sets forth the specific conditions by which that statute is to be enforced, as the FCRA does. The Court wrote that "[t]o hold otherwise—to permit plaintiffs to remedy the absence of a waiver of sovereign immunity in specific, detailed statutes by pleading general Tucker Act jurisdiction—would transform the sovereign-immunity landscape." Whether a suit for damages could be brought against the federal government under the FCRA was a question that only the FCRA itself could answer, and the Court left that for the Seventh Circuit to address on remand.

== See also ==
- 2012 term opinions of the Supreme Court of the United States
- 2012 term United States Supreme Court opinions of Antonin Scalia
