= 2026 term opinions of the Supreme Court of the United States =

October 2026 to October 2027 SCOTUS opinions

The 2026 term of the Supreme Court of the United States began on October 5, 2026, and will conclude on October 3, 2027. The table below illustrates which opinion was filed by each justice in each case and which justices joined each opinion.

== Table key ==
- Delivered the court's opinion
- Joined the court's opinion
- Filed a concurrence
- Joined a concurrence
- Filed a dissent
- Joined a dissent
- Filed a concurrence/dissent
- Joined a concurrence/dissent
- Filed a statement
- Joined a statement
- Did not participate in the decision
- Decisions that do not note an argument date were decided without oral argument. Decisions that do not note a justice delivering the court's opinion are per curiam.
- Multiple concurrences and dissents within a case are numbered, with joining votes numbered accordingly. Justices frequently join multiple opinions in a single case; each vote is subdivided accordingly.
- An asterisk ( * ) in the court's opinion denotes that it was only a majority in part or a plurality. An asterisk in a joining vote denotes that the justice joined it only in part.
- A dash ( - ) denotes that the justice voted without filing or joining an opinion.

== 2026 term opinions ==
#	Case name and citation	Argued	Decided	Roberts	Thomas	Alito	Sotomayor	Kagan	Gorsuch	Kavanaugh	Barrett	Jackson
1	FCC v. Brown, 610 U.S. ___		October 14, 2026				-					-
2	Mullin v. Friends of the Ruidosa Church, 610 U.S. ___		November 9, 2026									-
#	Case name and citation	Argued	Decided	Roberts	Thomas	Alito	Sotomayor	Kagan	Gorsuch	Kavanaugh	Barrett	Jackson

== 2026 term membership and statistics ==
This will be the twenty–second term of Chief Justice John Roberts' tenure and the fifth term with the current membership.

Justice		Appointment history		Agreement with judgment		Opinions filed				
Seniority	Name	President	Date confirmed	%	#					Total
Chief Justice	John Roberts	George W. Bush	September 29, 2005	100%	2/2	0	0	0	0	0
Associate Justice	Clarence Thomas	George H. W. Bush	October 15, 1991	100%	2/2	0	0	0	0	0
Associate Justice	Samuel Alito	George W. Bush	January 31, 2006	100%	2/2	0	0	0	0	0
Associate Justice	Sonia Sotomayor	Barack Obama	August 6, 2009	50%	1/2	0	0	0	0	0
Associate Justice	Elena Kagan	Barack Obama	August 7, 2010	100%	2/2	0	0	0	0	0
Associate Justice	Neil Gorsuch	Donald Trump	April 7, 2017	100%	2/2	0	0	0	0	0
Associate Justice	Brett Kavanaugh	Donald Trump	October 6, 2018	100%	2/2	0	0	0	0	0
Associate Justice	Amy Coney Barrett	Donald Trump	October 26, 2020	100%	2/2	0	0	0	0	0
Associate Justice	Ketanji Brown Jackson	Joe Biden	April 7, 2022	0%	0/2	0	0	0	0	0
Notes on statistics: Opinion counts only include the bench opinions listed above; opinions relating to orders or in-chambers opinions are not included.; Agreement with the Court's judgment does not guarantee agreement with the reasoning expressed in its opinion. A justice is not considered in agreement if they dissented even in part. Agreement percentages are based only on the listed cases in which a justice participated and are rounded to the nearest one-tenth of one percentage point.; Individual opinion counts may not match the Supreme Court's totals due to cases where justices jointly author opinions, which is counted separately here, but only once in the Supreme Court's records.						Totals				
						0	0	0	0	0
