= Bailey v. United States (2013) =

- Supreme Court of the United States

Argued November 1, 2012 Decided February 19, 2013
- Full case name: Chunon L. Bailey, aka Polo v. United States of America
- Docket no.: 11-770
- Citations: 568 U.S. 186 (more) 133 S. Ct. 1031; 185 L. Ed. 2d 19; 2013 U.S. LEXIS 1075; 81 U.S.L.W. 4065

Case history
- Prior: Motion to suppress evidence denied, United States v. Bailey, 468 F. Supp. 2d 373 (E.D.N.Y. 2006); conviction affirmed, 652 F.3d 197 (2d Cir. 2011); cert. granted, 566 U.S. 1033 (2012).
- Subsequent: Conviction affirmed on remand, 743 F.3d 322 (2d Cir. 2014); cert. denied, 135 S. Ct. 705 (2014).

Holding
- Suspect who had left property in vehicle prior to search was no longer in immediate vicinity when detained almost a mile away, thus no interests of law enforcement justified detention; evidence obtained from suspect that supported conviction was thus unconstitutionally obtained.

Court membership
- Chief Justice John Roberts Associate Justices Antonin Scalia · Anthony Kennedy; Clarence Thomas · Ruth Bader Ginsburg; Stephen Breyer · Samuel Alito; Sonia Sotomayor · Elena Kagan

Case opinions
- Majority: Kennedy, joined by Roberts, Scalia, Ginsburg, Sotomayor, Kagan
- Concurrence: Scalia, joined by Ginsburg, Kagan
- Dissent: Breyer, joined by Thomas, Alito

Laws applied
- U.S. Const. amend. IV

Bailey v. United States, 568 U.S. 186 (2013), was a United States Supreme Court case concerning search and seizure. A 6–3 decision reversed the weapons conviction of a Long Island man who had been detained when police followed his vehicle after he left his apartment just before it was to be searched. Justice Anthony Kennedy wrote the majority opinion, and Antonin Scalia filed a concurrence. Stephen Breyer dissented.

The Second Circuit Court of Appeals had upheld the conviction. It accepted the government's argument that the Court's 1981 holding in Michigan v. Summers that persons in the immediate vicinity of a search can be detained while the search was being executed was broad enough to cover the pursuit and detention of a defendant who had left the scene in a vehicle. Kennedy's opinion held that it did not, since once Bailey had driven away none of the law-enforcement interests the earlier holding identified were involved. Scalia said that the only thing that mattered was that the vehicle was no longer in the immediate vicinity, and that balancing tests created confusion. Breyer argued that the police did, in fact, have those interests despite Bailey's departure by vehicle.

== Background ==
On Thursday, July 28, 2005, officers of the Suffolk County, New York, police department obtained a warrant to search the basement apartment of a house for a .380-caliber handgun. The warrant was obtained based on a tip by a confidential informant who told police officers that he had seen the gun on a previous weekend when purchasing drugs at the apartment from a man named "Polo".

Before executing the search warrant, two officers surveilling the apartment observed two men exit the apartment complex, both of whom matched the description provided by the confidential informant. The officers watched the men get into a car and drive away.

The officers followed the two individuals for approximately 5 minutes or one mile, and then pulled the men over. They ordered the men out of the car and conducted a pat down search, which turned no weapons or contraband. The officers then seized the driver's keys and handcuffed both men. The officers told them men that they were not under arrest, but were being detained incident to the execution of the search warrant.

The officers drove the two men back to the apartment, which by then had been secured and searched by other officers. The search turned up multiple guns, ammunition, drugs and drug paraphernalia. Both men were then formally placed under arrest.

Chunon L. Bailey, one of the two men arrested, was charged with possessing cocaine with the intent to distribute and possessing a firearm as a felon. He moved to suppress the evidence based on his unlawful detention after he had already left his apartment. The trial court rejected that motion, holding that the detention was justified under Michigan v. Summers. The defendant was convicted and, on appeal, the United States Court of Appeals for the Second Circuit agreed.

== Legal Background ==
In Michigan v. Summers, 452 U.S. 692 (1981), the Court adopted the categorical rule that officers executing a search warrant for contraband may detain the occupants of the premises while the search is conducted. In the ruling, three justifications were identified for detaining occupants while executing a search warrant: (1) the legitimate law enforcement interest in preventing flight in the event that incriminating evidence is found, (2) the interest in minimizing the risk of harm to the officers, and (3) the orderly completion of the search, which may be facilitated if the occupants of the premises are present. This case presents the question whether the rule of Summers extends to the detention of a former occupant who has left the immediate vicinity of the premises before the warrant is executed.

=== Commentary ===
Multiple scholars have questioned the efficacy of applying Michigan v. Summers to individuals who have departed the premises being searched. One commentator, in examining the application of Michigan v. Summers over the course of thirty years, acknowledged the lack of clarity in the Supreme Court's original decision as to whether the categorical rule that occupants may be detained applies to "recent occupants":

as some courts have recognized, in the case where the limited authority to detain occupants includes the authority to detain individuals who have already left the premises, the rationale underlying Summers is severely undercut. First, in these cases, the intrusion posed by detention is more pronounced because the individual is detained outside of his place of residence, often in public, and transported back to the residence being searched. Thus, unlike Summers, the detention adds more significantly to "the public stigma associated with the search" and involves both "the inconvenience" and "the indignity" of being transported by the police. Second, where the "occupant" is not present on the premises at the time of the search, the law enforcement interests are also severely undercut. Because the individual is not present on the premises, he will generally not be aware that a search is being conducted and, therefore, there is no risk of flight upon the discovery of incriminating evidence. Additionally, an individual who has exited the premises poses no risk of harm to the police officers or other occupants.

He argues that this is one way in which the rule from Michigan v. Summers has been "extended well beyond what the Court's initial rationale should reasonably allow" and, as a result, has "put at risk the very liberty interests that it was designed to protect".

== Opinion of the Court ==
In a 6–3 decision, the Court reversed and remanded the Second Circuit Court's ruling, stating that it was an unreasonable seizure under the Fourth Amendment. Writing for the majority, Justice Kennedy agreed that the Michigan v. Summers ruling was broad enough to cover the pursuit and detention of a suspect who had left the scene. However, because none of the law-enforcement interests the earlier holding identified were involved, officers did not have probable cause in this case to detain the suspects a mile away from the scene before the apartment was searched, and it thus added an additional level of intrusiveness: "As demonstrated here, detention beyond the immediate vicinity can involve an initial detention away from the scene and a second detention at the residence. In between, the individual will suffer the additional indignity of a compelled transfer back to the premises".

Justice Scalia concurred in the judgment. Joined by Justices Ginsburg and Kagan, he however argued that once suspects leave the immediate vicinity, the scope and balancing tests of the Michigan v. Summers ruling should no longer apply because ordinary law enforcement interests would then take over: "The Summers exception is appropriately predicated only on law enforcement's interest in carrying out the search unimpeded by violence or other disruptions ... Preventing flight is not a special governmental interest—it is indistinguishable from the ordinary interest in apprehending suspects. Similarly, the interest in inducing residents to open locked doors or containers [to facilitate the orderly completion of the search] is nothing more than the ordinary interest in investigating crime".

Justice Breyer, joined with Justices Thomas and Alito, filed a dissenting opinion. Breyer argued that officers did, in fact, have those law-enforcement interests, but also had reasonable justifications for stopping the suspects away from their apartment. "Considerations related to the risks of flight, of evidence destruction, and of physical danger overcome any administrative advantages. Consider why the officers here waited until the occupants had left the block to stop them: They did so because the occupants might have been armed".
