= Standard Fire Insurance Co. v. Knowles =

- Supreme Court of the United States

Decided March 19, 2013
- Full case name: Standard Fire Insurance Co. v. Knowles
- Citations: 568 U.S. 588 (more)

Holding
- A class action plaintiff cannot defeat federal court jurisdiction by stipulating that they will not seek damages above the amount-in-controversy requirement.

Court membership
- Chief Justice John Roberts Associate Justices Antonin Scalia · Anthony Kennedy; Clarence Thomas · Ruth Bader Ginsburg; Stephen Breyer · Samuel Alito; Sonia Sotomayor · Elena Kagan

Case opinion
- Majority: Breyer, joined by unanimous

Laws applied
- Class Action Fairness Act of 2005

Standard Fire Insurance Co. v. Knowles, 568 U.S. 588 (2013), was a United States Supreme Court case in which the court held that a class-action plaintiff cannot defeat federal court jurisdiction by stipulating that they will not seek damages above the amount-in-controversy requirement.

== Background ==
The Class Action Fairness Act of 2005 (CAFA) gives federal district courts original jurisdiction over class actions in which the matter in controversy exceeds $5 million in sum or value, and it provides that to determine whether a matter exceeds that amount the "claims of the individual class members must be aggregated." When Knowles filed a proposed class action in Arkansas state court against Standard Fire Insurance Company, he stipulated that he and the class would seek less than $5 million in damages. Pointing to CAFA, Standard Fire removed the case to the federal District Court, but it remanded to the state court, concluding that the amount in controversy fell below the CAFA threshold in light of Knowles's stipulation, even though it found that the amount would have fallen above the threshold absent the stipulation. The Eighth Circuit Court of Appeals declined to hear Standard Fire's appeal.

== Opinion of the court ==
The Supreme Court issued an opinion on March 19, 2013. It vacated and remanded the case to the Eighth Circuit Court, holding that the stipulation does not defeat federal jurisdiction, and that the district court, when following the statute to aggregate the proposed class members' claims should have ignored the stipulation that the plaintiffs waived any recovery for the class above the $5 million threshold as Knowles could not bind the rest of the class.
