= FTC v. Phoebe Putney Health System, Inc. =

Federal Trade Commission v. Phoebe Putney Health System, Inc.
- Supreme Court of the United States

Decided February 19, 2013
- Full case name: FTC v. Phoebe Putney Health System, Inc.
- Citations: 568 U.S. 216 (more)

Holding
- State-action immunity does not apply when the state has not clearly articulated and affirmatively expressed that its plan to enter the market will substantially lessen competition.

Court membership
- Chief Justice John Roberts Associate Justices Antonin Scalia · Anthony Kennedy; Clarence Thomas · Ruth Bader Ginsburg; Stephen Breyer · Samuel Alito; Sonia Sotomayor · Elena Kagan

Case opinion
- Majority: Sotomayor, joined by unanimous

FTC v. Phoebe Putney Health System, Inc., 568 U.S. 216 (2013), was a United States Supreme Court case in which the court held that state-action immunity does not apply when the state has not clearly articulated and affirmatively expressed that its plan to enter the market will substantially lessen competition.

== Background ==
Under Georgia's Hospital Authorities Law (Law), political subdivisions may create special-purpose public entities called "hospital authorities" to provide "for the operation and maintenance of needed health care facilities in the several counties and municipalities of th[e] state." The Law permits authorities to "exercise public and essential governmental functions" and delegates to them numerous general powers, including the ability to acquire and lease hospitals and other public health facilities.

The Hospital Authority of Albany–Dougherty County (Authority) owns Phoebe Putney Memorial Hospital (Memorial), one of two hospitals in the county. The Authority formed two private nonprofit corporations to manage Memorial: Phoebe Putney Health System, Inc. (PPHS) and Phoebe Putney Memorial Hospital, Inc. (PPMH). After the Authority decided to purchase the second hospital in the county and lease it to a subsidiary of PPHS, the Federal Trade Commission (FTC) issued an administrative complaint alleging that the transaction would substantially reduce competition in the market for acute-care hospital services, in violation of §5 of the Federal Trade Commission Act and §7 of the Clayton Act. The FTC and Georgia subsequently sued the Authority, PPHS, PPMH, and others (collectively defendants), seeking to enjoin the transaction pending administrative proceedings.

The federal District Court denied the request for a preliminary injunction and granted the defendants' motion to dismiss, holding that the defendants were immune from antitrust liability under the state action doctrine. The Eleventh Circuit Court of Appeals affirmed. It concluded that the Authority, as a local governmental entity, was entitled to state-action immunity because the challenged anticompetitive conduct was a foreseeable result of the Law. The court reasoned that the state legislature could have readily anticipated an anticompetitive effect, given the breadth of the powers delegated to hospital authorities, particularly leasing and acquisition powers that could lead to consolidation of hospital ownership.

== Opinion of the court ==
The Supreme Court issued an opinion on February 19, 2013.
