= Chaidez v. United States =

- Supreme Court of the United States

Argued November 1, 2012 Decided February 20, 2013
- Full case name: Roselva Chaidez, Petitioner v. United States.
- Docket no.: 11–820
- Citations: 568 U.S. 342 (more) 133 S. Ct. 1103; 185 L. Ed. 2d 149; 2013 U.S. LEXIS 1613; 81 U.S.L.W. 4112
- Opinion announcement: Opinion announcement

Case history
- Prior: Federal Court determined that Padilla v. Kentucky could be held retroactively

Holding
- Padilla v. Kentucky cannot be used retroactively.

Court membership
- Chief Justice John Roberts Associate Justices Antonin Scalia · Anthony Kennedy; Clarence Thomas · Ruth Bader Ginsburg; Stephen Breyer · Samuel Alito; Sonia Sotomayor · Elena Kagan

Case opinions
- Majority: Kagan, joined by Roberts, Scalia, Kennedy, Breyer, Alito
- Concurrence: Thomas
- Dissent: Sotomayor, joined by Ginsburg

Chaidez v. United States, 568 U.S. 342 (2013), was a United States Supreme Court case that determined that the ruling in Padilla v. Commonwealth of Kentucky could not be applied retroactively, because the Padilla case applied a new rule to the Sixth Amendment to the United States Constitution. Padilla v. Kentucky held that the Sixth Amendment made it mandatory for criminal defense attorneys to advise non-citizen clients about the deportation risks of a guilty plea. While Padilla v. Kentucky was a case related to immigration and deportation, Justice Scalia worried that there was "no logical stopping point" to how Padilla v. Commonwealth of Kentucky can be applied. Justice Scalia wondered if the same logic could be extended and applied to numerous other cases, and felt it would be impossible for attorneys to make sure any client was informed of all the potential legal consequences post trial.

Chaidez v. United States placed a limitation on the ruling in Padilla holding that it does not apply to any case before March 31, 2010, when the Padilla decision was issued. Some legal scholars speculate that this decision was made in part to prevent a "flood" of new cases from any time in the past. Non-citizens challenging a deportation case who do not have protection under Padilla v. Commonwealth of Kentucky are still able to appeal a trial if they have been otherwise misadvised regarding the actual trial. Chaidez v. United States did not clarify whether or not individuals who filed a claim before March 31, 2010, but whose final conviction took place after March 31, 2010, were able to receive protection from Padilla v. Kentucky.

== Background ==
Roselva Chaidez, the petitioner, was born in Mexico but moved to the United States in the 1970s. She became a lawful permanent resident of the United States in 1977. She was originally brought to court over an insurance defraud case in the early 2000s. Chaidez pretended to be a passenger in a car collision to be able to receive part of the insurance claim. From this claim, she received about $1,200 until the insurance company later picked up on the defraud. This insurance defraud was of a larger insurance scheme led by other individuals, which earned approximately $26,000. In the original case, she pleaded guilty and sentenced to four years of probation. She was unaware of the potential deportation consequences this would have.

Chaidez disclosed the information about her guilty plea when she was applying to become a United States citizen in 2007. While she only played a minor role in a larger fraud scheme, the total fraud of the larger scheme was above $10,000 and therefore considered an aggravated felony under United States law. Her application was being reviewed in 2009, when it was discovered that her crime meant that according to the law she should be deported from the United States. Chaidez challenged her original defraud case on the grounds that she was not warned about deportation at the same time Padilla v. Commonwealth was being decided in the courts.

== Decisions ==
The Supreme Court decided that Padilla V. Commonwealth of Kentucky could not be held retroactively, due to the Supreme Court's decision in Teague v. Lane. Teague v. Lane said that Supreme Court cases could not be applied retroactively if they apply a "new rule" or obligation on the part of the government. A court case is considered a new rule when "the result is not dictated by precedent existing at the time the defendant's conviction became final" but does not create a new rule when it is merely extending a previously ruling. The crucial question in Chaidez v. United States was whether it was established outside of the courts that criminal defense attorneys had a known obligation to disclose information. This court's final decision established that Padilla v. Commonwealth of Kentucky established a new rule, and therefore could not be applied retroactively. Seven of the supreme court justices were in favor of the decision in Chaidez v. United States, while two voted against it.

=== Majority opinion ===
The majority opinion was given by Justice Elena Kagan. She stated that the decision in Padilla v. Commonwealth of Kentucky was a new rule relating to whether the Sixth Amendment could relate to deportation. As Chaidez's insurance defraud trial was decided before this new rule, she was not offered any additional protections as a part of this ruling. In her argument, she mentioned previous court cases where it was ruled that attorney do not have to warn their clients about risks that will result from a guilty plea such as deportation such as Santos-Sanchez v. United States and United States v. George.

When the Supreme Court justices decided Padilla v. Commonwealth of Kentucky, Justice Kagan stated "we answered a question about the Sixth Amendment's reach that we had left open" in the past and therefore it must be viewed as a new rule.

=== Concurring opinion ===
Justice Clarence Thomas delivered the concurring opinion. He said that the decision held in Padilla v. Commonwealth of Kentucky was different than previous interpretations of the Sixth Amendment. Justice Thomas had dissented when voting in Padilla v. Kentucky, so he extended his argument further than whether or not Padilla v. Commonwealth of Kentucky imposed a new rule. Justice Thomas had a different interpretation of the Sixth Amendment than most of the other Supreme Court Justices who had voted for Padilla v. Commonwealth of Kentucky. In his view, the Sixth Amendment "provides for adequate assistance of counsel in the charged offense and does not extend to advice regarding possible consequences, such as deportation". In the testimony, he stated that he does not only believe Padilla v. Kentucky should not held retroactively, but believes it should be overturned as a whole.

=== Dissenting opinion ===
Justices Sonia Sotomayor and Ruth Bader Ginsburg voted against the majority opinion. Sotomayor delivered the dissenting opinion. She says that the new ruling did not create a new rule, but that it extended an existing rule and therefore should be applied retroactively. The previous precedent, she argued came on behalf of Strickland v. Washington, which stated that attorneys should give a level of "reasonably effective assistance", which she believed Chaidez's attorney had failed to do.

== Challenges by state supreme courts ==
The ruling in Chaidez v. United States has been challenged at the state level. The Supreme Court of Massachusetts ruled that Padilla v. Commonwealth of Kentucky can be applied retroactively in Commonwealth v. Clarke, 460 Mass. 30 (2011). The Supreme Court of Massachusetts examined the case of Teague v. Lane and applied a different conclusion than the Supreme Court of the United States. The Supreme Court argued that "because relief under Padilla may only be sought by defendants pursuant to Rule 30 motions, such claims for relief should be directed as a direct view, thus even a new rule can be applied retroactively. State law, in this instance Rule 30, allowed for Massachusetts to apply its own interpretation of previous Supreme Court precedents. Rule 30 is a Criminal Procedure Rule in Massachusetts law that dictates who the appeal process works in the legal system, and allows for protections for those appealing court decisions including allowing individuals to start a new trial under certain circumstances.
