= Michigan v. Summers =

- Supreme Court of the United States

Argued February 25, 1981 Decided June 22, 1981
- Full case name: State of Michigan v. George Summers
- Citations: 452 U.S. 692 (more) 101 S. Ct. 2587; 69 L. Ed. 2d 340

Holding
- A warrant to search for contraband founded on probable cause implicitly carries with it the limited authority to detain the occupants of the premises while a proper search is conducted.

Court membership
- Chief Justice Warren E. Burger Associate Justices William J. Brennan Jr. · Potter Stewart; Byron White · Thurgood Marshall; Harry Blackmun · Lewis F. Powell Jr. William Rehnquist · John P. Stevens

Case opinions
- Majority: Stevens, joined by Burger, White, Blackmun, Powell, Rehnquist
- Dissent: Stewart, joined by Brennan, Marshall

Laws applied
- U.S. Const. amend. IV

Michigan v. Summers, 452 U.S. 692 (1981), was a 6–3 decision by the United States Supreme Court which held that for Fourth Amendment purposes, a warrant to search for contraband founded on probable cause implicitly carries with it the limited authority to detain the occupants of the premises while a proper search is conducted.

== Background ==
As Detroit Police Department police officers were about to execute a warrant to search a house for narcotics, they encountered George Summers descending the front steps. They requested his assistance in gaining entry, and detained him while they searched the premises. After finding narcotics in the basement and ascertaining that Summers owned the house, the police arrested him, searched his person, and found in his coat pocket an envelope containing 8.5 grams (0.30 oz) of heroin. Summers was charged with possession of the heroin found on his person. He moved to suppress the heroin as the product of an illegal search in violation of the Fourth Amendment and the trial judge granted the motion and quashed the information. Both the Michigan Court of Appeals and the Michigan Supreme Court affirmed the trial court's judgment.

== Decision ==
The Supreme Court reversed the judgment below, holding that the detention of Summers did not violate the Fourth Amendment. Justice Stevens, writing for the majority, noted that the detention did amount to a 'seizure' within the meaning of the Fourth Amendment and assumed that the seizure was not supported by probable cause. However, the majority likened this case to its jurisprudence on street frisks, in Terry v. Ohio, and border searches, in United States v. Brignoni-Ponce, and explained that an exception to the general requirement of probable cause might be made based on the "character of the official intrusion and its justification." With respect to the character of the intrusion, the majority opinion rested in large part on the fact that a neutral magistrate had issued a search warrant for contraband:

Of prime importance in assessing the intrusion is the fact that the police had obtained a warrant to search respondent's house for contraband. A neutral and detached magistrate had found probable cause to believe that the law was being violated in that house, and had authorized a substantial invasion of the privacy of the persons who resided there. The detention of one of the residents while the premises were searched, although admittedly a significant restraint on his liberty, was surely less intrusive than the search itself.

The majority also noted that the detention of Summers carried little public stigma because he was being detained in his own residence, as opposed to in public. The majority found three justifications for detaining occupants while executing a search warrant: (1) the legitimate law enforcement interest in preventing flight in the event that incriminating evidence is found, (2) the interest in minimizing the risk of harm to the officers, and (3) the orderly completion of the search, which may be facilitated if the occupants of the premises are present. The majority also emphasized that the existence of a search warrant provides objective justification for the detention. On these grounds, the majority held that, for Fourth Amendment purposes, a warrant to search for contraband founded on probable cause implicitly carries with it the limited authority to detain the occupants of the premises while a proper search is conducted.

== Criticism ==
The bright-line rule announced in Michigan v. Summers has received mixed reception. Professor Wayne R. LaFave has taken the position that the rule is sound because it is well-tailored to the governmental interests at stake. Furthermore, the clarity of the rule will protect liberty. Other scholars have challenged the efficacy and clarity of the bright-line rule in practice. One scholar has made the case that the Summers rule has been "extended well beyond what the Court's initial rationale should reasonably allow" and, as a result, has "put at risk the very liberty interests that it was designed to protect."
