= Johnson v. Williams =

- Supreme Court of the United States

Decided February 20, 2013
- Full case name: Johnson v. Williams
- Citations: 568 U.S. 289 (more)

Holding
- For purposes of AEDPA, when a state court rules against a defendant in an opinion that rejects some of the defendant's claims but does not expressly address a federal claim, a federal habeas court must presume, subject to rebuttal, that the federal claim was adjudicated on the merits.

Court membership
- Chief Justice John Roberts Associate Justices Antonin Scalia · Anthony Kennedy; Clarence Thomas · Ruth Bader Ginsburg; Stephen Breyer · Samuel Alito; Sonia Sotomayor · Elena Kagan

Johnson v. Williams, 568 U.S. 289 (2013), was a United States Supreme Court case in which the court held that, for purposes of the Antiterrorism and Effective Death Penalty Act of 1996, when a state court rules against a defendant in an opinion that rejects some of the defendant's claims but does not expressly address a federal claim, a federal habeas court must presume, subject to rebuttal, that the federal claim was adjudicated on the merits.

== Background ==
The Antiterrorism and Effective Death Penalty Act of 1996 (AEDPA) provides that a federal habeas court may not grant relief to a state prisoner whose claim has already been "adjudicated on the merits in State court," unless the claim's adjudication resulted in a decision that was "contrary to, or involved an unreasonable application of, clearly established Federal law, as determined by [this] Court" or "based on an unreasonable determination of the facts in light of the evidence presented in the State court proceeding."

A California jury convicted Tara Sheneva Williams of first-degree murder. On direct appeal to the California Court of Appeal, she claimed that the trial court's questioning and dismissal of a juror during deliberations violated both the Sixth Amendment and California law. In holding that the juror had been properly dismissed for bias, the California Court of Appeal quoted the definition of "impartiality" from United States v. Wood, but it did not expressly acknowledge that it was deciding a Sixth Amendment issue. The California Supreme Court remanded for further consideration in light of its intervening People v. Cleveland decision, which held that a trial court abused its discretion by dismissing for failure to deliberate a juror who appeared to disagree with the rest of the jury about the evidence. Reaffirming its prior decision on remand, the State Court of Appeal discussed Cleveland, again quoted Wood, and failed to expressly acknowledge that Williams had raised a federal claim.

When Williams later sought federal habeas relief, the federal District Court applied §2254's deferential standard of review for claims adjudicated on the merits and denied relief. But the Ninth Circuit Court of Appeals concluded that the State Court of Appeal had not considered Williams' Sixth Amendment claim. The court then reviewed that claim de novo and held that the questioning and dismissal of the juror violated the Sixth Amendment.

== Opinion of the court ==
The Supreme Court issued an opinion on February 20, 2013.
