= Marx v. General Revenue Corp. =

- Supreme Court of the United States

Decided February 26, 2013
- Full case name: Marx v. General Revenue Corp.
- Citations: 568 U.S. 371 (more)

Holding
- The Fair Debt Collection Practices Act did not modify Federal Rule of Civil Procedure 54(d)(1).

Court membership
- Chief Justice John Roberts Associate Justices Antonin Scalia · Anthony Kennedy; Clarence Thomas · Ruth Bader Ginsburg; Stephen Breyer · Samuel Alito; Sonia Sotomayor · Elena Kagan

Case opinions
- Majority: Thomas
- Dissent: Sotomayor, joined by Kagan

Marx v. General Revenue Corp., 568 U.S. 371 (2013), was a United States Supreme Court case in which the court held that the Fair Debt Collection Practices Act did not modify Federal Rule of Civil Procedure 54(d)(1).

== Background ==
Olivea Marx filed suit, alleging that General Revenue Corporation (GRC) violated the Fair Debt Collection Practices Act (FDCPA) by harassing and falsely threatening her in order to collect on a debt. The federal District Court ruled against Marx and awarded GRC costs pursuant to Federal Rule of Civil Procedure 54(d)(1), which gives district courts discretion to award costs to prevailing defendants "[u]nless a federal statute... provides otherwise."

Marx sought to vacate the award, arguing that the court's discretion under Rule 54(d)(1) was displaced by the FDCA in 15 U. S. C. §1692k(a)(3), which provides that, "[o]n a finding by the court that an action under this section was brought in bad faith and for the purpose of harassment, the court may award to the defendant attorney’s fees reasonable in relation to the work expended and costs." The District Court rejected Marx's argument.

The Tenth Circuit Court of Appeals affirmed, agreeing that costs are allowed under the Rule and concluding that nothing in the statute's text, history, or purpose indicates that it was meant to displace the Rule.

== Opinion of the court ==
The Supreme Court issued an opinion on February 26, 2013.

In dissent, Justice Sonia Sotomayor said the plain text of Rule 52(b)(1) should have dictated the outcome of this case. It says the default procedure specified within the rule applies unless another statute "provides otherwise." Because the FDCA included a costs portion with relevant language, she would have held that the FDCA's text controlled. She criticized the majority opinion for rendering statutory language "meaningless."
