= Sebelius v. Auburn Regional Medical Center =

- Supreme Court of the United States

Decided January 22, 2013
- Full case name: Sebelius v. Auburn Regional Medical Center
- Citations: 568 U.S. 145 (more)

Holding
- The 180-day statute of limitations for a hospital to appeal a final Medicare reimbursement is not jurisdictional, but it is also not subject to equitable tolling.

Court membership
- Chief Justice John Roberts Associate Justices Antonin Scalia · Anthony Kennedy; Clarence Thomas · Ruth Bader Ginsburg; Stephen Breyer · Samuel Alito; Sonia Sotomayor · Elena Kagan

Case opinions
- Majority: Ginsburg, joined by unanimous
- Concurrence: Sotomayor

Sebelius v. Auburn Regional Medical Center, 568 U.S. 145 (2013), was a United States Supreme Court case in which the court held that the 180-day statute of limitations for a hospital to appeal a final Medicare reimbursement is not jurisdictional, but it is also not subject to equitable tolling.

== Background ==
The reimbursement amount health care providers receive for inpatient services rendered to Medicare beneficiaries is adjusted upward for hospitals that serve a disproportionate share of low-income patients. The adjustment amount is determined in part by the percentage of a hospital's patients who are eligible for Supplemental Security Income (SSI), called the SSI fraction. Each year, the Centers for Medicare & Medicaid Services (CMS) calculates the SSI fraction for an eligible hospital and submits that number to the hospital's "fiscal intermediary," a Department of Health and Human Services (HHS) contractor. The intermediary computes the reimbursement amount due and then sends the hospital a Notice of Program Reimbursement (NPR). A provider dissatisfied with the determination has a right to appeal to the Provider Reimbursement Review Board (PRRB or Board) within 180 days of receiving the NPR under 42 U. S. C. §1395oo(a)(3). By regulation, the Secretary of HHS authorized the PRRB to extend the 180-day limit, for good cause, up to three years.

The Baystate Medical Center—not a party to this case—timely appealed its SSI fraction calculation for each year from 1993 through 1996. The PRRB found that errors in CMS's methodology resulted in a systematic undercalculation of the disproportionate share adjustment and corresponding underpayments to providers. In March 2006, the Board's Baystate decision was made public. Within 180 days, respondent hospitals filed a complaint with the Board, challenging their adjustments for 1987 through 1994. Acknowledging that their challenges were more than a decade out of time, they urged that equitable tolling of the limitations period was in order due to CMS's failure to tell them about the computation error. The PRRB held that it lacked jurisdiction, reasoning that it had no equitable powers save those legislation or regulation might confer. On judicial review, the federal District Court dismissed the hospitals' claims. The D.C. Circuit reversed. The presumption that statutory limitations periods are generally subject to equitable tolling, the court concluded, applied to the 180-day time limit because nothing in §1395oo(a)(3) indicated that Congress intended to disallow such tolling.

== Opinion of the court ==
The Supreme Court issued an opinion on January 22, 2013.
