= Evans v. Michigan =

- Supreme Court of the United States

Argued November 6, 2012 Decided January 20, 2013
- Full case name: Lamar Evans v. Michigan
- Docket no.: 11-1327
- Citations: 568 U.S. 313 (more) 133 S. Ct. 1069; 185 L. Ed. 2d 124; 2013 U.S. LEXIS 1614
- Argument: Oral argument

Case history
- Prior: Acquittal reversed and remanded, 288 Mich. App. 410, 794 N.W.2d 848 (2010); affirmed, 491 Mich. 1, 810 N.W.2d 535; cert. granted, 567 U.S. 905 (2012).

Holding
- The double jeopardy clause bars a retrial when a directed verdict was rendered, even if erroneous.

Court membership
- Chief Justice John Roberts Associate Justices Antonin Scalia · Anthony Kennedy; Clarence Thomas · Ruth Bader Ginsburg; Stephen Breyer · Samuel Alito; Sonia Sotomayor · Elena Kagan

Case opinions
- Majority: Sotomayor, joined by Roberts, Scalia, Kennedy, Thomas, Ginsburg, Breyer, Kagan
- Dissent: Alito

Laws applied
- U.S. Const. amend. V

Evans v. Michigan, 568 U.S. 313 (2013), was a United States Supreme Court case in which the Court held that if a person accused of a crime receives a directed acquittal, the Double Jeopardy Clause bars a second trial of that person for the same crime, even if the person was acquitted in error.
