= Smith v. United States (2013) =

- Supreme Court of the United States

Argued November 6, 2012 Decided January 9, 2013
- Full case name: Smith v. United States
- Docket no.: 11-8976
- Citations: 568 U.S. 106 (more) 133 S. Ct. 714; 184 L. Ed. 2d 570
- Argument: Oral argument

Case history
- Prior: Motion to sever for trial granted, United States v. Gray, 173 F. Supp. 2d 1 (D.D.C. 2001); Order requiring defendants to wear stun belts during trial, United States v. Gray, 254 F. Supp. 2d 1 (D.D.C. 2002); Defendants convicted, motion for new trial denied, United States v. Gray, 292 F. Supp. 2d 71 (D.D.C. 2003); Affirmed sub nom., United States v. Moore, 651 F.3d 30 (D.C. Cir. 2011); Cert. granted sub nom., Smith v. United States, 567 U.S. 916 (2012).

Holding
- The burden of proof remains on the defendant to prove withdrawal from a conspiracy.

Court membership
- Chief Justice John Roberts Associate Justices Antonin Scalia · Anthony Kennedy; Clarence Thomas · Ruth Bader Ginsburg; Stephen Breyer · Samuel Alito; Sonia Sotomayor · Elena Kagan

Case opinion
- Majority: Scalia, joined by unanimous

Smith v. United States, 568 U.S. 106 (2013), was a case decided by the Supreme Court of the United States of America. The case was argued on November 6, 2012, and decided on January 9, 2013.

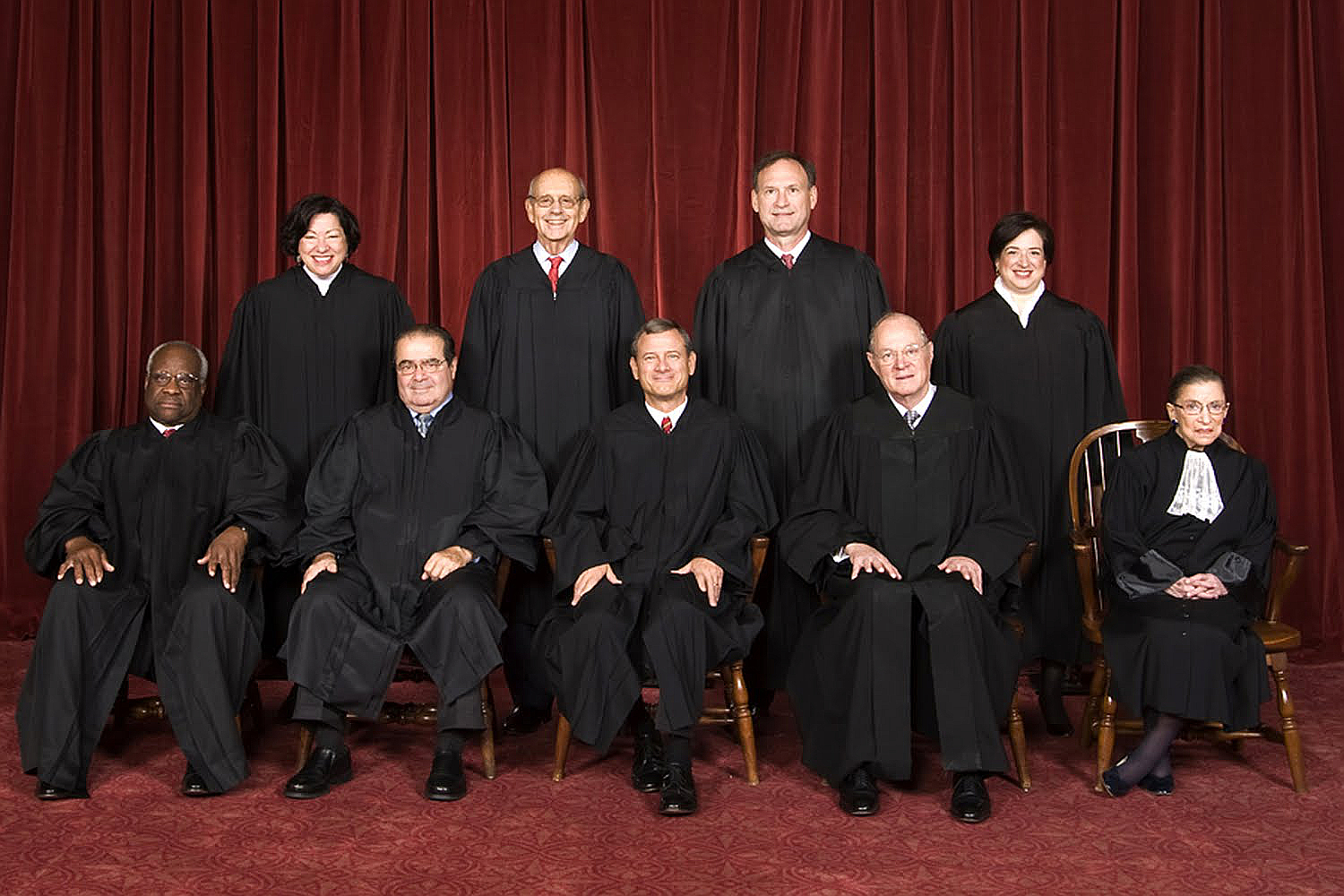
Roberts Court

== Question of the Case ==
When a group has been charged with drug conspiracy, and several key members of the group claim they withdrew from the conspiracy at a point in time that would call into question the statute of limitations, is it the role of the government to prove that the drug conspiracy continued in a way that nullifies the statute of limitations?

== Facts of the case ==
There were six men, convicted through trial of several charges, including violations of the RICO act and drug conspiracy. The specific statutes are 21 U.S.C. § 846 and 18 U.S.C. § 1962(d), where the prior regards attempt and conspiracy, and the latter regards prohibited activities. The statute used in defense of Smith was 18 U.S.C. § 3282. The case had been heard by the District of Columbia Circuit Court, which held that Smith should be convicted so long as the government had proven beyond a reasonable doubt the existence of conspiracy and Smith's involvement. The court held that the jury should rule in favor of Smith if he proves that he withdrew from the conspiracy at a time appropriate to the statute of limitations, as the burden of proof was on Smith if the government proved his involvement in the conspiracy.

== Decision ==
In a unanimous decision, the court, with the majority opinion written by Antonin Scalia sided against Smith. The court created a new precedent that presumes involvement in a conspiracy if the statute of limitations defense is used, shifting the burden of proof to the defendant. The court determined that it is the burden of the defendant to prove that they withdrew from a conspiracy, and that they did so past the statute of limitations. The Due Process Clause of The Constitution of the United States of America is not violated by putting the burden of proof on the defendant. Though argued by the defendant, the court concluded that Mullaney v. Wilbur does not apply in this case. Because Smith took part in a conspiracy, the defense of withdrawal is to be proven by the defendant, as it is assumed that he was a part of the conspiracy throughout. The court also decided that innocence is not determined solely by withdrawing from a conspiracy, as withdrawal has to coincide with the statute of limitations. To further understand the burden of proof on the government in accordance with the ruling, see Dixon v. United States.
