= Gunn v. Minton =

- Supreme Court of the United States

Argued January 26, 2013 Decided February 20, 2013
- Full case name: Jerry W. Gunn, et al., Petitioners v. Vernon F. Minton
- Docket no.: 11-1118
- Citations: 568 U.S. 251 (more) 133 S. Ct. 1059; 185 L. Ed. 2d 72; 2013 U.S. LEXIS 1612; 81 U.S.L.W. 4085; 105 U.S.P.Q.2d 1665
- Argument: Oral argument
- Opinion announcement: Opinion announcement

Case history
- Prior: Summary judgment granted in favor of defendant, 2006 WL 3542699 (Tex. Dist. Sept. 16, 2006); affirmed, Minton v. Gunn, 301 S.W.3d 702 (Tex. App. 2009); reversed, 355 S.W.3d 634 (Tex. 2011); cert. granted, 568 U.S. 936 (2012).
- Subsequent: Supreme Court of Texas overturned, remanded to Texas state courts for further proceedings.

Holding
- 28 U.S.C. § 1338(a), which provides for exclusive federal jurisdiction over a case "arising under any Act of Congress relating to patents," does not deprive the state courts of subject matter jurisdiction over a state law claim alleging legal malpractice in a patent case.

Court membership
- Chief Justice John Roberts Associate Justices Antonin Scalia · Anthony Kennedy; Clarence Thomas · Ruth Bader Ginsburg; Stephen Breyer · Samuel Alito; Sonia Sotomayor · Elena Kagan

Case opinion
- Majority: Roberts, joined by unanimous

Laws applied
- 28 U.S.C. § 1338(a)

Gunn v. Minton, 568 U.S. 251 (2013), is a US patent law case. The case dealt with the question of jurisdiction of patent law litigation in regard to attorney malpractice. In a unanimous ruling, the United States Supreme Court decided that federal laws granting exclusive jurisdiction to cases involving patents does not preclude the ability of state courts to hear cases related to but not involving patents. The case was remanded to the Texas state courts for further proceedings.
