= Decker v. Northwest Environmental Defense Center =

- Supreme Court of the United States

Decided March 20, 2013
- Full case name: Decker v. Northwest Environmental Defense Center
- Citations: 568 U.S. 597 (more)

Holding
- A provision of the Clean Water Act governing challenges to Environmental Protection Agency actions, 33 U.S.C. § 1369(b), does not prohibit a citizen suit under Section 1365 when the suit is against an alleged violator and seeks to enforce an obligation imposed by the CWA or its regulations.

Court membership
- Chief Justice John Roberts Associate Justices Antonin Scalia · Anthony Kennedy; Clarence Thomas · Ruth Bader Ginsburg; Stephen Breyer · Samuel Alito; Sonia Sotomayor · Elena Kagan

Case opinions
- Majority: Kennedy, joined by Roberts, Thomas, Ginsburg, Alito, Sotomayor, Kagan; Scalia (Parts I & II)
- Concurrence: Roberts, joined by Alito
- Concur/dissent: Scalia
- Breyer took no part in the consideration or decision of the case.

Laws applied
- Clean Water Act

Decker v. Northwest Environmental Defense Center, 568 U.S. 597 (2013), was a United States Supreme Court case in which the court held that a provision of the Clean Water Act governing challenges to Environmental Protection Agency actions, 33 U.S.C. § 1369(b), does not prohibit a citizen suit under Section 1365 when the suit is against an alleged violator and seeks to enforce an obligation imposed by the CWA or its regulations. The court also held that the case was not moot due to regulations issued in the interim. The case was consolidated with Georgia-Pacific West, Inc. v. Northwest Environmental Defense Center.
