= Henderson v. United States (2013) =

- Supreme Court of the United States

Argued November 28, 2012 Decided February 20, 2013
- Full case name: Armarcion D. Henderson v. United States
- Docket no.: 11-9307
- Citations: 568 U.S. 266 (more) 133 S. Ct. 1121; 185 L. Ed. 2d 85; 2013 U.S. LEXIS 1611; 81 U.S.L.W. 4089

Case history
- Prior: United States v. Henderson, 646 F.3d 223 (5th Cir. 2011); rehearing en banc denied, 665 F.3d 160 (5th Cir. 2011); cert. granted, 567 U.S. 934 (2012).

Holding
- An error is deemed to be a "plain error" based on the law at the time of the appellate review of the case, not at the time of the trial. It is unreasonable to expect either the defendant or the trial court to predict the outcome of unsettled issues of law, therefore it is the role of the appellate court to review what is considered "plain error" at the time of the appellate review.

Court membership
- Chief Justice John Roberts Associate Justices Antonin Scalia · Anthony Kennedy; Clarence Thomas · Ruth Bader Ginsburg; Stephen Breyer · Samuel Alito; Sonia Sotomayor · Elena Kagan

Case opinions
- Majority: Breyer, joined by Roberts, Kennedy, Ginsburg, Sotomayor, Kagan
- Dissent: Scalia, joined by Thomas, Alito

Henderson v. United States, 568 U.S. 266 (2013), was a United States Supreme Court case in which the Court held regardless of whether a legal question was settled or unsettled at the time of trial, an error is "plain" within the meaning of Rule 52(b) of Federal Rule of Criminal Procedure so long as the error was plain at the time of appellate review.

== Background ==
Armarcion D. Henderson pleaded guilty to possessing a firearm while being a felon; a federal violation. The sentencing guideline range was 33–41 months, but the judge sentenced Henderson to 60 months to ensure that he had the opportunity to enroll in the Bureau of Prisons drug program. Henderson's counsel did not object to the sentence, but, on appeal, Henderson claimed that the District Court plainly erred in increasing his sentence solely for rehabilitative purposes. Eight days after sentencing, Henderson filed a motion to correct the sentence. The district court denied the motion.

The U.S. Court of Appeals for the Fifth Circuit affirmed, holding that Henderson did not preserve the error for correction under the Federal Rules of Criminal Procedure, so the court reviewed the decision for "plain error". Henderson did not show plain error because the error was not clear under current law at the time of trial. The court of appeals denied a petition for rehearing.

While the appeal was pending, this Court decided in Tapia v. United States that it is an error for a court to "impose or lengthen a prison sentence to enable an offender to complete a treatment program or otherwise to promote rehabilitation." While this meant that the District Court's sentence was erroneous, the Fifth Circuit determined that Rule 52(b) did not give it authority to correct the error. In doing so, it concluded that an error is "plain" under the rule only if it was clear under current law at the time of trial, but that, in this case, Circuit law was unsettled until Tapia was decided.

== Opinion of the Court ==
Justice Breyer delivered the majority opinion of the Court in a 6–3 decision. A federal court of appeals normally will not correct a legal error made in criminal trial court proceedings unless the defendant first brought the error to the trial court's attention. But Federal Rule of Criminal Procedure 52(b), creating an exception to the normal rule, says that "[a] plain error that affects substantial rights may be considered even though it was not brought to the [trial] court’s attention." The Rule does not say explicitly, however, as of just what time the error must be "plain". Must the lower court ruling be plainly erroneous as of the time the lower court made the error? Or can an error still count as "plain" if the erroneous nature of that ruling is not "plain" until the time of appellate review? The case before us concerns a District Court's decision on a substantive legal question that was unsettled at the time the trial court acted, thus foreclosing the possibility that any error could have been "plain" then. Before the case was final and at the time of direct appellate review, however, the question had become settled in the defendant's favor, making the trial court's error "plain"—but not until that later time. In our view, as long as the error was plain as of that later time—the time of appellate review— the error is "plain" within the meaning of the Rule. And the Court of Appeals "may...conside[r]" the error even though it was "not brought to the [trial] court's attention".

Justice Scalia wrote a dissenting opinion in which he argued that an issue of law that is unsettled at the time of the trial cannot be considered "plain error" for the purposes of appellate review. An error can only be plain if it should have been obvious to the court and the prosecution at the time of the trial. Justices Thomas and Alito joined in the dissent.
