= Chafin v. Chafin =

- Supreme Court of the United States

Argued December 5, 2012 Decided February 19, 2013
- Full case name: Jeffrey Lee Chafin v. Lynne Hales Chafin
- Docket no.: 11-1347
- Citations: 568 U.S. 165 (more) 133 S. Ct. 1017; 185 L. Ed. 2d 1
- Argument: Oral argument
- Opinion announcement: Opinion announcement
- Decision: Opinion

Case history
- Prior: Chafin v. Chafin, No. 11-15355-CC, 2012 WL 9083825 (11th Cir. Feb. 6, 2012); cert. granted, 567 U.S. 960 (2012).
- Subsequent: Chafin v. Chafin, No. 11-15355-CC, 742 F.3d 934 (11th Cir. Dec. 18, 2013)

Questions presented
- Whether an appeal of a district court order under the Hague Convention on the Civil Aspects of International Child Abduction, providing for return of a child to the country of the child’s habitual residence, becomes moot if the child is returned pending appeal.

Holding
- The appeal of a district court's decision to return a child to his country of residence is not precluded by the child's departure from the United States.

Court membership
- Chief Justice John Roberts Associate Justices Antonin Scalia · Anthony Kennedy; Clarence Thomas · Ruth Bader Ginsburg; Stephen Breyer · Samuel Alito; Sonia Sotomayor · Elena Kagan

Case opinions
- Majority: Roberts, joined by unanimous
- Concurrence: Ginsburg, joined by Scalia, Breyer

Laws applied
- International Child Abduction Remedies Act

Chafin v. Chafin, 568 U.S. 165 (2013), was a United States Supreme Court case in which the Court held the appeal of a district court's decision to return a child to his country of residence is not precluded by the child's departure from the United States. It arose from the divorce proceedings of Mr. and Ms. Chafin; she wanted their daughter to live with her in Scotland, while he wanted her to remain in the United States with him.

== Background ==
Sergeant First Class Jeffrey Lee Chafin, an American soldier, married Lynne Hales Chafin in Scotland in March 2006. They had a daughter together, who went to live with her mother in Scotland while her father was serving in Afghanistan. After Chafin's deployment was over, the family reunited in Alabama. There, in 2010, Jeffrey Chafin filed for divorce, as well as seeking temporary custody of his daughter after Ms. Chafin was arrested for domestic assault.

After her arrest, the United States Immigration and Customs Enforcement learned that Ms. Chafin had overstayed her visa, and she was deported. She then sued in American court, demanding that her daughter be returned to Scotland, so that a Scottish court could decide the custody issue under the Hague Convention on the Civil Aspects of International Child Abduction.

== Lower courts ==
Ms. Chafin's lawsuit was heard in the District Court for the Northern District of Alabama. There, following a bench trial, the district court granted her request, ordering that the daughter be returned to Scotland. Mr. Chafin announced his intention to appeal the decision, and asked that the court's order be stayed until the appeal was heard. However, the court declined to stay the ruling pending an appeal. The daughter left for Scotland the same day.

The district court separately ordered Mr. Chafin to pay Ms. Chafin $100,000 to cover legal fees and travel expenses.

Mr. Chafin appealed the district court's order to the U.S. Court of Appeals for the Eleventh Circuit. But the appeals court declined to hear his challenge, refusing to consider the merits of the appeal. Instead, the appeals court declared that the case was moot, given that his daughter had already returned to Scotland. As a result, it denied his appeal, instead ordering the district court to vacate the return order and dismiss the entire case.

Mr. Chafin then appealed to the United States Supreme Court, which accepted the case. One of the factors in the Court's decision to accept the case was that the Eleventh Circuit's decision that the case was moot did not match the views of the Fourth Circuit, which in 2003 ruled that appeals courts did retain jurisdiction in such situations. This disagreement created a circuit split, which increases the likelihood that the Supreme Court will accept a case.

== Supreme Court decision ==
=== Issue ===
The case hinged on the Hague Convention on the Civil Aspects of International Child Abduction. Specifically, the Convention seeks "to establish procedures to ensure [the] prompt return [of children] to the State of their habitual residence." The United States is a signatory to the convention. The District Court, in keeping with the United States' obligation under the convention, decided that the Chafins' daughter should be returned to Scotland, which was her habitual residence. The issue on appeal, however, was whether the case was moot as a result of her departure from the United States, rather than the underlying decision on the merits of the case.

However, the Convention does not address the situation that arose in this case, where one party seeks to contest a finding of the child's "habitual residency".

=== Ruling ===
The Court concluded that despite leaving the country, U.S. courts still maintained jurisdiction over Ms. Chafin. Thus, in a decision authored by John Roberts, it held that the American judicial system could still order her to return the child. Accordingly, the Supreme Court unanimously held that "such return does not render this case moot." The Court vacated the Eleventh Circuit's decision and remanded the case back to the Eleventh Circuit to evaluate the merits of the appeal. It further noted that, even if Ms. Chafin were to ignore an adverse result, that alone did not preclude the case from being appealed, and that the Scottish courts that were simultaneously deciding the custody dispute could be influenced by the result of the case.

Roberts further argued that, if such appeals were moot, parents might be inclined to immediately leave the United States after securing custody of a child, to prevent the possible loss of an appeal. Such attempts to evade American jurisdiction could prompt judges to stay their rulings as a preventative measure to retain jurisdiction, in which case "a child would lose precious months when she could have been readjusting to life in her country of habitual residence, even though the appeal has little chance of success." The Court also concluded that the legal fees Mr. Chafin had been ordered to pay meant that the case was not mooted by the daughter's departure to Scotland, since Mr. Chafin had not yet paid the $100,000 to his ex-wife.

== Subsequent developments ==
The Eleventh Circuit, hearing the case for a second time, then considered the underlying merits of the appeal. The court ruled against Mr. Chafin. In a per curiam decision, the appeals court affirmed the original judgment, deferring to the district court's decision that the child's "habitual residence" was Scotland.

== See also ==
- Hague Convention on the Civil Aspects of International Child Abduction
- International Child Abduction Remedies Act
