= Gabelli v. SEC =

- Supreme Court of the United States

Argued January 8, 2013 Decided February 27, 2013
- Full case name: Gabelli et al. v. Securities and Exchange Commission
- Docket no.: 11-1274
- Citations: 568 U.S. 442 (more) 133 S. Ct. 1216; 185 L. Ed. 2d 297; 2013 U.S. LEXIS 1861; 81 U.S.L.W. 4142
- Argument: Oral argument

Case history
- Prior: SEC v. Gabelli, No. 1:08-cv-03868, 2010 WL 1253603 (S.D.N.Y. Mar. 17, 2010); reversed, 653 F.3d 49 (2d Cir. 2011); cert. granted, 567 U.S. 968 (2012).
- Subsequent: SEC v. Gabelli, 518 F. App'x 32 (2d Cir. 2013)

Holding
- The statute of limitations for filing civil penalty actions initiates when the offending act is committed.

Court membership
- Chief Justice John Roberts Associate Justices Antonin Scalia · Anthony Kennedy; Clarence Thomas · Ruth Bader Ginsburg; Stephen Breyer · Samuel Alito; Sonia Sotomayor · Elena Kagan

Case opinion
- Majority: Roberts, joined by unanimous

Laws applied
- 28 U.S.C. § 2462

Gabelli v. SEC, 568 U.S. 442 (2013), was a United States Supreme Court case in which the Court ruled that the statute of limitations for filing civil penalty actions initiates when the offending act is committed or finished.

== Court case ==
=== Suit ===
The Securities and Exchange Commission filed suit against Bruce Alpert and Marc Gabelli of Gabelli Funds, LLC, alleging the firm made secret agreements with Headstart Advisers Ltd concerning Headstart's investment in a mutual fund managed by Gabelli. Headstart realized large profits at the expense of Gabelli's remaining investors, and the SEC argued that Gabelli's actions violated the Investment Advisers Act. Gabelli and Alpert sought dismissal of the case, arguing the SEC lawsuit came after the five year statute of limitations expired. In response, the SEC argued that under the discovery rule, the statute had not expired when the case was filed.

=== Ruling ===
In a unanimous decision, Chief Justice John Roberts ruled against the federal government's argument that the discovery rule determined the statute of limitations for filing the fraud lawsuit. Roberts' opinion explained that the discovery rule, which starts the statute of limitations once the plaintiff becomes aware of the fraud, applies only to victims of the fraud itself. Government regulatory agencies are subject to the standard rule, which initiates the statute of limitations upon the perpetration of the fraud. Under this earlier threshold, the SEC missed the five-year deadline to file suit against Gabelli. The Supreme Court's decision reversed the earlier decision of the Second Circuit, and the case was remanded to the lower courts.

== See also ==
- 2012 term opinions of the Supreme Court of the United States
