= Already, LLC v. Nike, Inc. =

- Supreme Court of the United States

Decided January 9, 2013
- Full case name: Already, LLC v. Nike, Inc.
- Citations: 568 U.S. 85 (more)

Holding
- An unconditional and irrevocable commitment not to enforce a trademark against the defendant in an action moots that action over the defendant's objection that the trademark is invalid.

Court membership
- Chief Justice John Roberts Associate Justices Antonin Scalia · Anthony Kennedy; Clarence Thomas · Ruth Bader Ginsburg; Stephen Breyer · Samuel Alito; Sonia Sotomayor · Elena Kagan

Case opinions
- Majority: Roberts, joined by unanimous
- Concurrence: Kennedy, joined by Thomas, Alito, Sotomayor

Already, LLC v. Nike, Inc., 568 U.S. 85 (2013), was a United States Supreme Court case in which the court held that an unconditional and irrevocable commitment not to enforce a trademark against the defendant in an action moots that action over the defendant's objection that the trademark is invalid.

== Background ==
Nike, Inc. filed a lawsuit alleging that two of Already's athletic shoes violated Nike's Air Force 1 trademark. Already denied the allegations and filed a counterclaim challenging the validity of Nike's Air Force 1 trademark.

While the suit was pending, Nike issued a "Covenant Not to Sue," promising not to raise any trademark or unfair competition claims against Already or any affiliated entity based on Already's existing footwear designs, or any future Already designs that constituted a "colorable imitation" of Already's current products. Nike then moved to dismiss its claims with prejudice, and to dismiss Already's counterclaim without prejudice on the ground that the covenant had extinguished the case or controversy.

Already opposed dismissal of its counterclaim, contending that Nike had not established that its covenant had mooted the case. In support, Already presented an affidavit from its president, stating that Already planned to introduce new versions of its lines into the market; affidavits from three potential investors, asserting that they would not consider investing in Already until Nike's trademark was invalidated; and an affidavit from an Already executive, stating that Nike had intimidated retailers into refusing to carry Already's shoes.

The Federal District Court dismissed Already's counterclaim, concluding that there was no longer a justiciable controversy. The Second Circuit Court of Appeals affirmed. It explained that the covenant was broadly drafted, that the court could not conceive of a shoe that would infringe Nike's trademark yet not fall within the covenant, and that Already had not asserted any intent to market such a shoe.

== Opinion of the court ==
The Supreme Court issued an opinion on January 9, 2013.

== Subsequent developments ==
After the Supreme Court’s unanimous decision, commentators and practitioners in trademark and federal jurisdiction law noted the case’s impact on mootness and Article III justiciability. The Court’s application of the voluntary cessation doctrine clarified that a broad, unconditional covenant not to sue can divest federal courts of jurisdiction over a trademark claim and any related counterclaims where no realistic threat of future litigation remains. This standard has influenced how courts and litigants assess whether declaratory judgement and counterclaim actions challenging intellectual property registrations remain justiciable after a covenant not to enforce rights is issued.

Additionally, legal analyses emphasize that because this case held such covenants could moot a case despite objections that the underlying trademark might be invalid, affected parties seeking to invalidate registered intellectual property rights may instead pursue remedies through administrative proceedings before the U.S. Patent and Trademark Office, where appropriate, rather than relying solely on federal litigation.
