= Rights restoration =

Return of voting rights to people with felony convictions

Rights restoration is the process of restoring voting rights to people with prior felony convictions who lost their voting rights under felony disenfranchisement. It may also refer to additional civil rights that are taken away upon conviction, such as holding public office and serving on a jury.

In the United States, the voting rights of people convicted of a felony vary from state to state. In most states, the right to vote is automatically or eventually restored upon the completion of the sentence. In three states – Florida, Kentucky and Iowa – all individuals convicted of felonies lose their voting rights permanently, and they must directly petition the government to get them back. Critics of these voting prohibitions argue that voting is an unalienable right and should not be taken away from citizens who have finished their prison terms.

== Background ==
Compared to other nations, the United States is very strict with regard to denying the right to vote to people with prior felony convictions. Under the Fourteenth Amendment of the U.S. Constitution, states are able to make their own rules on restricting the right to vote based on criminal convictions.

It is estimated that there are 5.85 million people in the United States who cannot vote due to felony convictions, including 2.6 million who have completed their sentences but are disenfranchised in states with the most restrictive policies. This accounts for approximately 2.5% of the eligible voter population, and almost 8% of the African-American eligible voter population.

== Felony disenfranchisement by state ==
See “Felony Disenfranchisement, Contemporary Practice By Country, United States”

== Advocacy for rights restoration ==
Several groups in the U.S. are active in the movement to restore voting rights to people with prior felony convictions, including the American Civil Liberties Union, FairVote, Prison Policy Initiative, Advancement Project, Florida Rights Restoration Coalition, and The Sentencing Project.

Among these groups and others, core reasons for ending felony disenfranchisement and restoring voting rights to people with prior felony convictions include:

=== Felony disenfranchisement is used to suppress the African-American vote ===
Although it has existed since colonial times, voter disenfranchisement boomed after the Civil War. Afraid of large black populations finally being able to vote, Southern states looked for ways to penalize African-American citizens and deny them the vote, both through Jim Crow laws and felony disenfranchisement.

=== Racial disparities ===
Due to racial disparities in the U.S. prison system, African Americans and Latinos are overrepresented in the incarcerated population. Thus, more African Americans and Latinos are often subject to felony disenfranchisement. While African Americans are only 13 percent of U.S. population, they make up 38 percent of the prison population. Latinos account for about 15 percent of the U.S. population and make up 20 percent of Americans in prison.

It is estimated that one out of every 13 African Americans is unable to vote due to prior felony convictions in states where felony disenfranchisement is prevalent.

=== Repatriation ===
Those in support of rights restoration argue that, once someone has completed prison time or other punishments, their punishment should end. That should also include the ending of voting restrictions. Advocates contend that this is crucial for people with prior felony convictions to fully reintegrate back into society.

"Once a citizen has done time and repaid his or her debt to society, they should not be deprived of their fundamental right to vote," said Judith Browne-Dianis, co-director of Advancement Project.

Studies have shown that former incarcerated people who are able to vote, find work and educate themselves are less likely to reoffend and return to the penal system.

== 2014 changes in rights restoration ==
In 2014, Virginia Gov. Terry McAuliffe removed all drug charges from the commonwealth's list of “violent” felony offenses, making more people eligible for Virginia's automatic voting rights restoration process for people with non-violent felony convictions.

In 2014, Attorney General Eric Holder called for voting rights to be restored to people with prior felony convictions at a speech at Georgetown University. Holder said, “It is time to fundamentally reconsider laws that permanently disenfranchise people who are no longer under federal or state supervision.”
