= 2021 United States capitol protests =

2021 United States capitol protests may refer to:

- 2020–21 United States election protests, some of which occurred at the United States Capitol and in state capitols
- January 6 United States Capitol attack, which occurred after a nearby protest
- 2021 United States inauguration week protests, which occurred in various state capitols
- Justice for J6 rally, demonstration that occurred in support of hundreds of people who were arrested and charged following the United States Capitol attack
