= Trump protest =

Trump protest or Trump protests may refer to:

- Protests against Donald Trump
- Attempts to overturn the 2020 United States presidential election
- 2020–2021 United States election protests
- 2025 United States protests against mass deportation
