= Neil Eggleston =

American lawyer (born 1953)

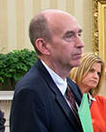

White House Counsel
- In office June 2, 2014 – January 20, 2017
- President: Barack Obama
- Preceded by: Kathryn Ruemmler
- Succeeded by: Don McGahn

Personal details
- Born: Warren Neil Eggleston; July 5, 1953 (age 73) Evansville, Indiana, U.S.
- Party: Democratic
- Spouse: Penda Hair
- Education: Duke University (BA); Northwestern University (JD)

Warren Neil Eggleston (born July 5, 1953) is an American lawyer who served as the White House counsel under President Barack Obama. Eggleston was the fourth person to hold this post during the Obama administration.

== Early life and education ==
A native of West Lafayette, Indiana, Eggleston graduated in 1971 from West Lafayette Junior-Senior High School. Eggleston earned a bachelor's degree from Duke University in 1975 and then a Juris Doctor degree in 1978 from the Northwestern University School of Law.

From 1978 until 1979, Eggleston served as a law clerk for Judge James Hunter III on the United States Court of Appeals for the Third Circuit. From 1979 until 1980, he was a law clerk for Chief Justice Warren E. Burger.

== Professional career ==
From 1981 until 1987, Eggleston was an Assistant U.S. Attorney and the chief appellate attorney for the Southern District of New York. From 1987 until 1988, Eggleston served as deputy chief counsel for the U.S. House of Representatives Select Committee to Investigate Covert Arms Transactions with Iran, which investigated the Iran-Contra Affair. From 1993 until 1994, he served in the White House as associate counsel to the president. Eggleston's work in the Clinton administration took place during congressional investigations into Clinton's Whitewater real estate transactions.

After leaving the White House, Eggleston represented former colleagues during corruption investigations, including Clinton's transportation secretary, Federico Peña, and his labor secretary, Alexis Herman. In both cases, no charges were ever filed.

In 2001, Eggleston represented Cheryl Mills, who was a board member of the William J. Clinton Presidential Library foundation, during a congressional investigation into President Clinton's last-minute pardon of fugitive financier Marc Rich, whose wife had been a foundation donor.

In 2005, Eggleston left the law firm of Howrey and joined the law firm of Debevoise & Plimpton as a partner, where he remained until 2012.

In 2007, Eggleston represented Sara Taylor, who was a White House political affairs director in the George W. Bush administration, during an inquiry from a congressional oversight committee into the Dismissal of U.S. attorneys controversy and other Bush policies that Democrats believed had politicized the work of federal agencies.

In 2009, Eggleston represented then-Obama chief of staff Rahm Emanuel during the prosecution of Illinois Gov. Rod Blagojevich. Around that same time, he also represented then-Sen. Kent Conrad during a congressional ethics inquiry into a mortgage he had received from Countrywide Financial.

From 2012 until 2014, Eggleston was a litigation partner at the law firm Kirkland & Ellis, based in Washington. Eggleston's private sector work included helping corporations navigate regulations imposed by the Obama administration.

== White House Counsel ==
On April 21, 2014, the White House announced that Eggleston would become White House counsel, replacing Kathryn Ruemmler upon her departure in May 2014.

== Personal ==
Eggleston lives in Chevy Chase, Maryland with his spouse Penda Hair, who co-founded and co-directs the civil rights organization Advancement Project. His daughter Rachel graduated from Dartmouth College in 2012 and is currently a Teach For America corps member in Rhode Island. His son Nathaniel graduated from Duke University in 2015 where he played soccer.

== See also ==
- List of law clerks for the chief justice of the United States

Legal offices
Preceded by Kathryn Ruemmler	White House Counsel; 2014–2017	Succeeded by Don McGahn
