= Moral Mondays =

Political protests in the United States

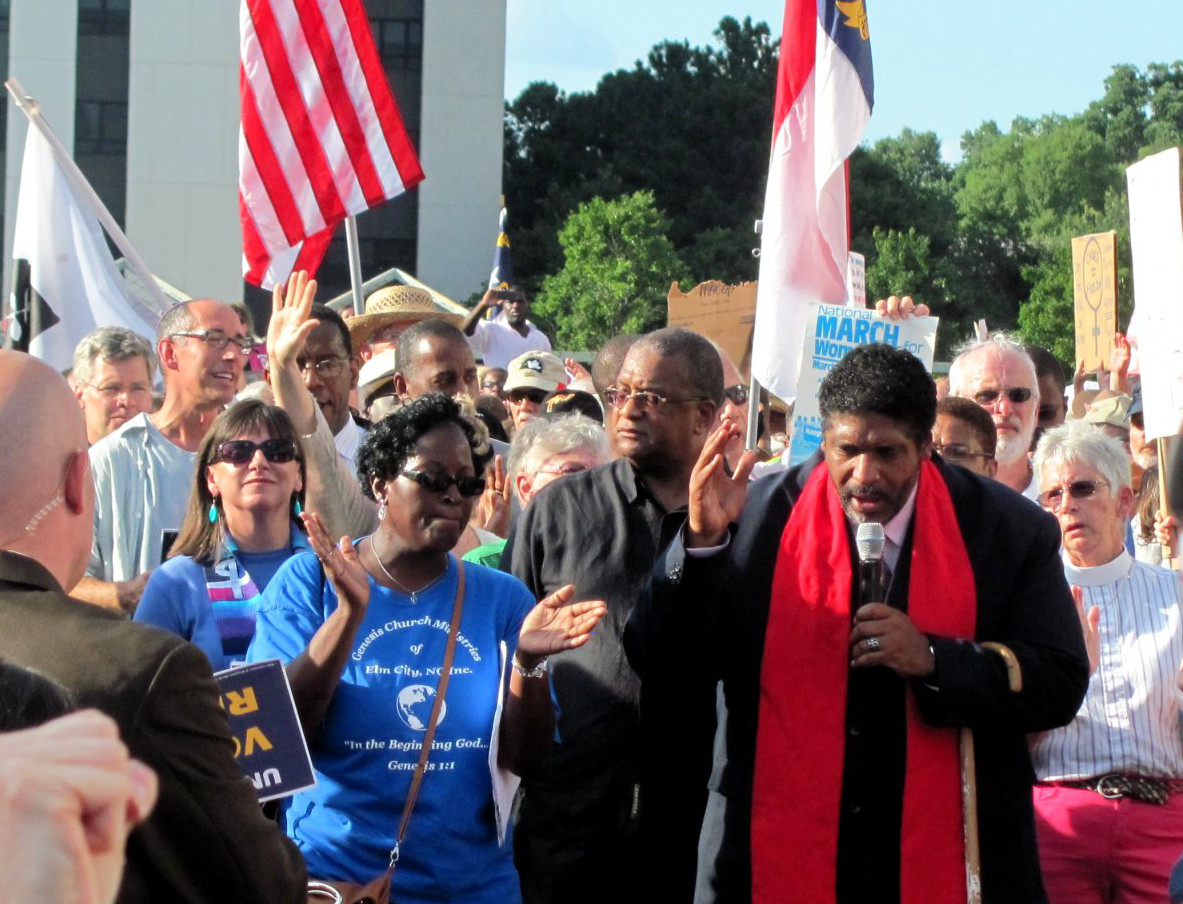
- Rev. William Barber speaking at a Moral Mondays rally on July 15, 2013
- Formation: April 2013
- Type: Grassroots
- Purpose: A grassroots movement against politics of North Carolina government and governor Pat McCrory in regard to voting rights, cutting social programs, changes in tax legislation, the repeal of the Racial Justice Act, restrictions to abortion rights, and the Public Facilities Privacy & Security Act.
- Location: North Carolina
- Remarks: methods include: Civil disobedience; Demonstrations

Moral Mondays are protests that originated in North Carolina, United States and emerged elsewhere in the United States. Led by religious progressives, the leaders of the protesters sought to restore "morality" in the public sphere. Protests began in response to several actions by the government of North Carolina which was elected into office in 2013 and are characterized by civil disobedience—specifically entering the state legislature building to be peacefully arrested. The movement protests many wide-ranging issues under the blanket claim of unfair treatment, discrimination, and adverse effects of government legislation on the citizens of North Carolina. The protests in North Carolina launched a grassroots social justice movement that, in 2014, spread to Georgia and South Carolina, and then to other U.S. states such as Illinois and New Mexico.

== Background ==
In 2012, North Carolina elected a Republican governor, Pat McCrory, and Republicans were voted into majority in both state houses by the citizens of North Carolina, giving them control of both the legislative and executive branch for the first time since 1870. After taking office, McCrory signed into law a number of bills promoting conservative governance, and the legislature has passed or considered a number of other laws that have generated controversy. The bills signed into law by McCrory and proposed legislation have been the target of ongoing "Moral Mondays" civil disobedience protests, organized in part by local Modern liberalism in the United States religious leaders including William Barber, head of the North Carolina chapter of the NAACP.

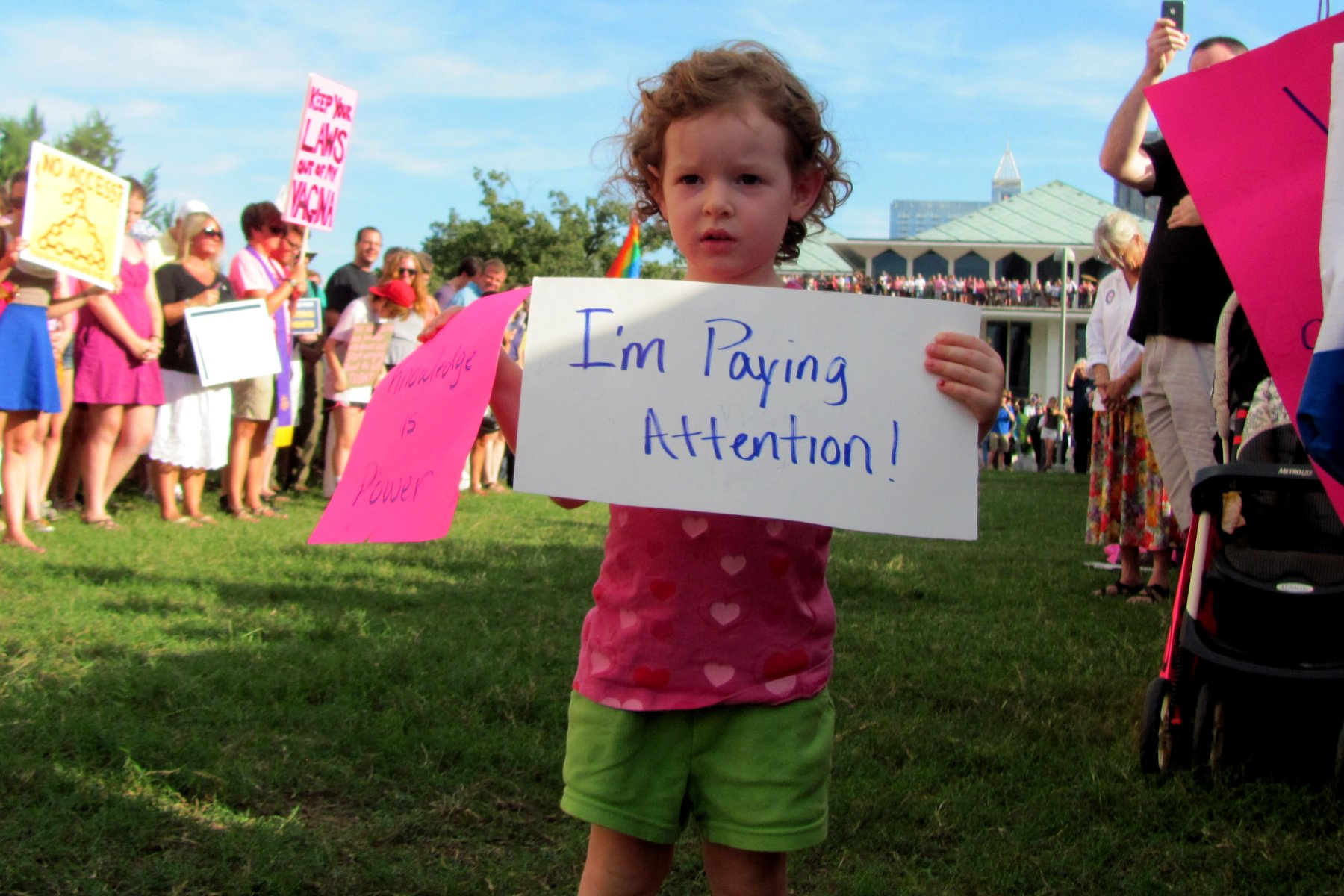
Moral Monday protests in Raleigh, NC on July 15, 2013

Members of the protest movement meet Monday to protest an action by the North Carolina legislature and then enter the legislature building. Once they enter, a number are peacefully arrested each Monday. The protestors are a wide range of mostly North Carolina citizens, with many Christian movements represented. The movement encompasses a broad coalition, including left wing advocates for immigrant rights, LGBT rights, criminal justice, worker's rights, environmental issues and others.

== Issues ==
=== Voting rights ===
Redistricting and proposed voting rights changes have been a focus of the ongoing protests. North Carolina Republicans benefited from a round of redistricting that was conducted in 2011 and used in the 2012 election. The redistricting process was upheld by a three-member panel of state judges in early July 2013, and is expected to be appealed. 51% of North Carolina voters chose a Democrat for their US house representative, but Republicans won 9 of the 13 seats up for election.

The state House passed legislation that would require voters to present government-issued photo identification, provided by the state free of charge, in order to vote and would repeal same-day voter registration and limit early voting. Legislators also passed "Equalize Voter Rights", a bill that would revoke the tax credit given to parents if their dependent college student registers to vote at their college/university address. This bill would also require voters to register their vehicles at the same address as their voter registration. The editorial board of The New York Times called this "a blatant effort to reduce Democratic voting strength in college towns like Chapel Hill and Durham."

McCrory said he would sign a revised version of the bill, which also included provisions that end same-day voter registration, reduce early voting, and end a program that allowed high school students to register to vote before their 18th birthdays. The bill also changed regulations for registration, requiring voters to appear in person or mail in a form 25 days before the election. When asked how preventing students from registering before their 18th birthdays would prevent voter fraud, McCrory said "I don't know enough, I'm sorry, I haven't seen that part of the bill."

In August 2013 McCrory signed into law the revised bill, which was the subject of renewed protests. North Carolina attorneys Adam Stein and Irv Joyner, along with, and pro bono counsel Kirkland & Ellis and racial justice nonprofit Advancement Project filed a complaint in federal district court on behalf of the North Carolina NAACP and 93-year-old Rosanell Eaton, a North Carolina woman impacted by the new law.

Advancement Project co-director Penda Hair called the law, "a targeted attack on voting," charging that the voting changes predominately affect African-American voters, who disproportionately use same-day registration and, during the 2012 election, used early voting at a rate of 70 percent.

Although a federal judge initially upheld the law, on July 29, 2016, a three-judge panel of the United States Court of Appeals for the Fourth Circuit unanimously voted to overturn most of the restrictive provisions of the law." Judge Diana Gribbon Motz's opinion for the panel noted, "The new provisions target African Americans with almost surgical precision" and "impose cures for problems that did not exist." Thus, she wrote, "the asserted justifications cannot and do not conceal the State's true motivation." On August 31, the Supreme Court deadlocked 4-4 on whether to overturn the decision, effectively leaving the Fourth Circuit Appeals Court's decision in place.

=== Environment ===
The Moral Mondays movement claims that environmental laws relating to air, water, and soil quality have been weakened by the Republican legislature, as evidenced by the 2014 Dan River coal ash spill; along with this, budgets for environmental agencies have been cut. The boards and commissions tasked with regulation of the environment were all replaced by new members that have links to McCrory and the Republicans currently in power in the General Assembly. A bill to allow hydraulic fracturing (commonly known as fracking) in North Carolina was passed rapidly with little or no public input.

=== Cuts to social programs ===
McCrory signed legislation that made North Carolina the 8th state to cut unemployment benefits since the start of the Great Recession. In addition to cutting maximum weekly unemployment benefits by 35%, the legislation reduced the maximum number of weeks of assistance to between 12 and 20, down from 26. This prevented 170,000 North Carolinians from benefiting from federal emergency extended benefits, which required a minimum of 26 weeks of state support. This allowed the state's unemployment fund, which became bankrupt over the course of the recession, to become solvent three years sooner. This move was criticized for weakening the safety net when the state had the nation's 5th highest unemployment, and for passing up federal support.

In March 2013, McCrory signed a bill that opted the state out of the expanded Medicaid program of the Affordable Care Act of 2009, which would have provided health care coverage to 500,000 North Carolinians, citing concerns about the sustainability of the program. He has also proposed managing Medicaid accounts, by enrolling patients in managed care programs run by private companies.

=== Tax changes ===
Legislators considered legislation that would remove or lower income taxes, making up for the lost revenue with an increased sales tax. McCrory distanced himself from this proposal, which was criticized by Art Pope, his deputy budget director, as being regressive. According to legislative analysts, the reform passed will result in some families, retirees and small business owners seeing a tax hike. All taxpayers have had to pay some additional sales taxes due to expansions of the tax to some services and higher sales tax on electricity. The largest income tax breaks has gone to higher-income earners as it replaced a three-tier progressive income tax with a flat tax. The changes reduced state revenue by $2 billion over 5 years, despite McCrory's previous insistence that any reform had to be revenue-neutral. After earlier predictions of a revenue shortfall because of tax reform, North Carolina instead had a $400 Million revenue surplus for Fiscal Year 2014–2015, because personal income growth was more robust, and lower tax refunds were paid out due to more accurate payroll withholding. The tax law changes through 2014 resulted in 55 to 60 percent of taxpayers having a tax decrease, 10 to 15 percent seeing no change, and 30 to 35 percent having a tax increase.

=== Racial Justice Act ===
McCrory signed into law a bill that repealed the state's Racial Justice Act of 2009, which allowed inmates facing the death penalty to challenge their sentences on the basis of racial discrimination. His predecessor, Bev Perdue, had previously vetoed similar legislation.

=== Abortion ===
In early July 2013 the state House unexpectedly attached a number of restrictions on abortion access to a bill described as combating Sharia law. It passed the house less than a day later but was abandoned after protests, and McCrory said he would not sign it without modifications. An amended version of the restrictions were later added to a motorcycle safety bill. This bill was passed by the state Senate, and became a subject of the protests.

In July 2013 McCrory signed into law legislation that requires abortion providers to meet the same standards as surgical centers, allows health-care providers to decline to perform abortions, and prohibits public health insurance policies from paying for abortions. Abortion-rights groups criticized McCrory, who had said during his campaign that he would not sign new abortion restrictions. After the McCrory administration issued in 2014 the new regulations for abortion clinics required by the law, abortion rights advocates were pleased with the regulation, saying the regulations would not require any clinics to close.

The day after McCrory signed the bill, he took a plate of chocolate chip cookies to protesters. They were returned to him with a note saying, "Gov. McCrory, we'll take women's health care over cookies!"

=== Public education ===
As of 2012, the average state teacher in North Carolina earned about $9,500 less than the average public school teacher in the US. The 2013 budget for state teachers did not include raises to base salary. Additionally, the budget phased out tenure for public school teachers by 2018, eliminated future salary increases for teachers who earn master's degrees, and cut $120 million from the budget for teacher assistants. Cuts to education have been one of the issues raised in the protests.

=== Public Facilities Privacy & Security Act ===
Since the passage of the Public Facilities Privacy & Security Act, protests against the act have been ongoing throughout the state of North Carolina.

== Protests ==
On the day of the first Moral Monday protest, Rev. Barber drafted a statement for the NC NAACP called "Why We Are Here Today," in which he outlined what was the catalyst for the Moral Monday protests.

Rev. Barber wrote: "(W)e have no other choice but to assemble in the people's house where these bills are being presented, argued, and voted upon, in hopes that God will move in the hearts of our legislators, as he moved in the heart of Pharaoh to let His people go. Some ask the question, why don't they be quiet? Well, I must remind you, that it has been our collective silence that has quietly opened the city gates to these undemocratic violators of our rights."

During that first protest on April 29, 2013, 17 were arrested. As the movement built momentum, more than 900 demonstrators were arrested as part of the Moral Monday movement, and police have estimated weekly attendance at over 2,500. Cited reasons for the protests include legislation recently passed or proposed on changes to Medicaid, changes to voting regulations, school vouchers, tax reform, and abortion. McCrory has criticized the protests as unlawful and a drain on state resources, and has declined to meet with them, later saying "outsiders are coming in and they're going to try to do to us what they did to Scott Walker in Wisconsin." The vast majority of attendees are North Carolina residents.

Once the legislature finished for 2013, an estimated 10,000 protesters gathered for Mountain Moral Monday at the Buncombe County Courthouse in Asheville.

The NAACP and others intended to visit all 13 North Carolina congressional districts. Rev. William Barber, the president of the NAACP's state chapter, said more people needed to register and vote to show their disapproval of state policies.

On August 19, 2013 the Moral Monday protests moved to Charlotte when 2,000 people gathered in Marshall Park for one of the city's largest protests. Organizers announced plans to return to Marshall Park and a dozen other sites across North Carolina.

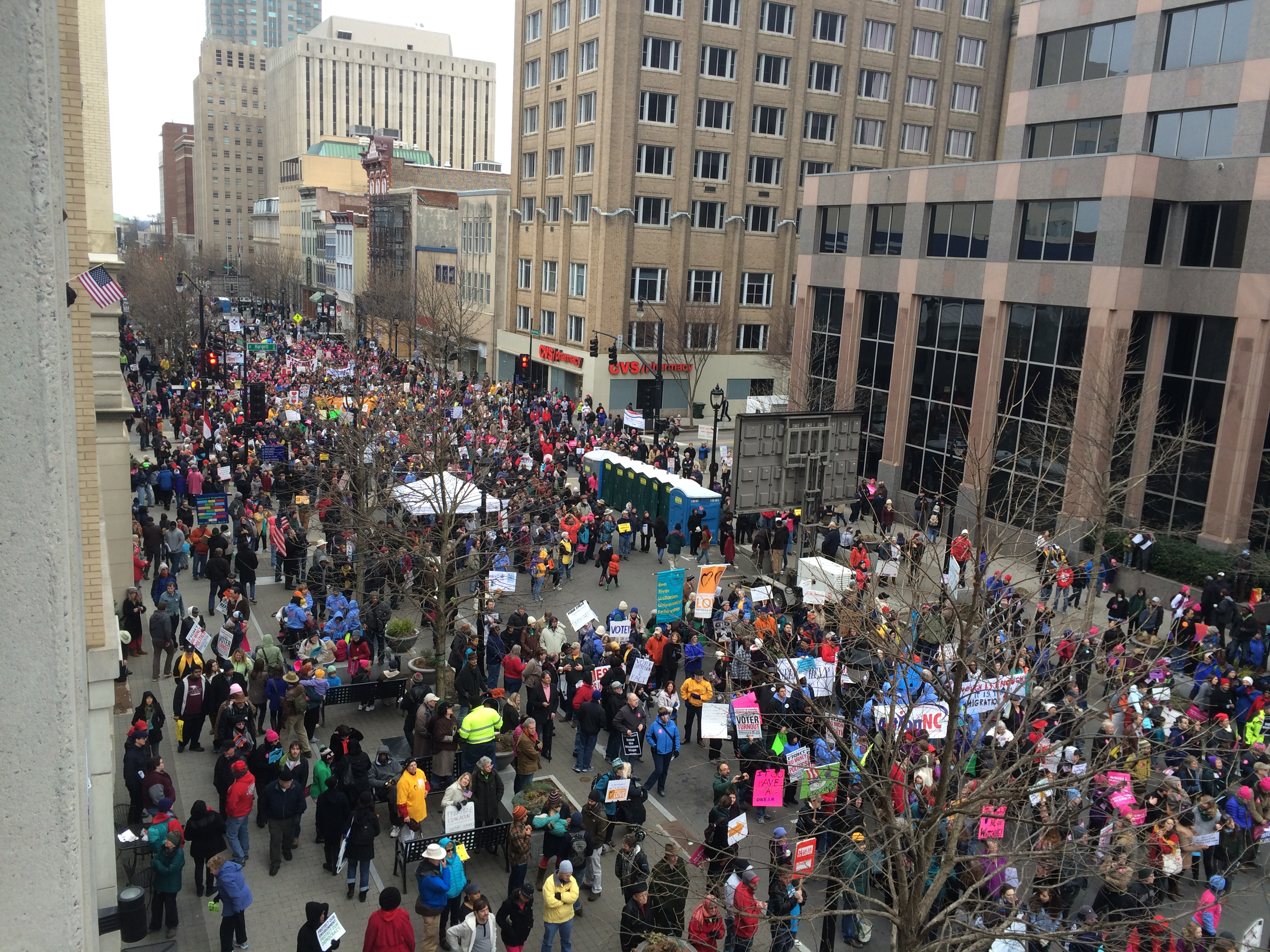
A section of the crowd from the HK on J protest.

On February 8, 2014, Moral Mondays participated in a cumulative protest called HK on J (Historic Thousands on Jones Street), its largest protest to date. The protest gathered in the morning around 9:30 at Shaw University and the march began at 10:30. Protesters marched from Shaw University down Wilmington Street then Davie Street and then Fayetteville Street congregating along Fayetteville Street for protest. It is reported that 80,000 people attended the rally, with Raleigh, NC policing saying they granted a permit for up to 30,000 people. Either way, this made it the largest Civil Rights protest in the South since the Selma-to-Montgomery marches in 1965.

During 2014, weekly protests took place in Raleigh starting in April. In May, a group staged a sit-in at the office of House Speaker Thom Tillis.

Adam O'Neal, Republican mayor of Belhaven, North Carolina, began a 14-day 273-mile walk to Washington, D.C., after Vidant Health closed his town's hospital in July. O'Neal ended up walking to Washington a second time and later walked to Raleigh.

== Criminal charges and trials ==
A total of 924 people were arrested during the 2013 protests in the legislature building. In August, the Wake County District Attorney offered them a deferred prosecution deal under which they would pay $180 in court costs and perform 25 hours of community service in exchange for having their charges dismissed. Fewer than two dozen accepted the deal. Trials for those who refused the deal began on October 4, 2013, with former Wake County district court judges Joy Hamilton and William Lawton appointed by the state to preside over them. Protestors were charged with second-degree trespassing, failure to disperse on command, and posting or displaying signs or placards in violation of legislative building rules. Despite the similarity in the cases, outcomes have significantly varied in different trials. Saladin Muhammad, the first to be tried, was convicted on all counts. In trials on October 11, 2013, all charges were dismissed. William Barber and others were convicted only of trespassing and violating building rules. The failure to disperse charge was dismissed due to lack of evidence that there was a threat of violence associated with the demonstrations. In other trials, the violation of building rules charges were deemed unconstitutional due to the vagueness of the rule regarding signs. Barber and others have announced their intention to appeal. As lower court judges in North Carolina are not required to provide the reasons for their rulings, the reasons for the differences between cases are often unknown.

On July 11, 2014 fourteen protestors pleaded guilty to second-degree trespassing, a class three misdemeanor, and received community service but could have the charges taken off their records.

== Impact ==
In January 2014, the Moral Mondays movement spread to Georgia with the formation of the group Moral Monday Georgia. Leaders of the group announced plans to protest Governor Nathan Deal's decision to reject federal funds for Medicaid expansion. The second rally held at the Georgia state Capitol building, again focusing on Medicaid expansion, resulted in 10 arrests for civil disobedience. January 2014 also saw the formation of the "Truthful Tuesday" movement in South Carolina.

The Moral Mondays movement also spread to Florida, Alabama, Missouri, and Indiana. Rev. Barber has also gone on to do training across the country in how other organizers can learn lessons from North Carolina's Moral Monday movement, including advising in the civil protests surrounding a police shooting death in Ferguson, Mo.

In 2016, Governor McCrory lost his bid for re-election to the Democratic candidate, state attorney general Roy Cooper. His defeat was viewed as at least partially a victory for Moral Mondays, which "galvanized opposition and drew news media attention with numerous acts of civil disobedience." However, the Republican-dominated legislature retaliated with a law severely limiting the powers of the governor, which Gov. McCrory signed into law before leaving office.
