= Fair Economy Illinois =

- Founded: 2010
- Type: Coalition
- Purpose: Economic justice; tax fairness; corporate accountability
- Location: Illinois, United States
- Region served: Illinois

Fair Economy Illinois is a coalition of four social justice groups, in the United States, that advocates against state budget cuts and for higher income taxes on wealthy individuals and businesses in Illinois by organizing urban, suburban and rural residents. It began in May 2011 as Make Wall Street Pay until it changed to its current name in March 2013. The group has also worked to pass a statewide ban on hydraulic fracturing and protested against financial support for the Illinois coal industry. Fair Economy Illinois organizes Moral Mondays Illinois protests.

== Affiliated Groups ==
The members of the Fair Economy Illinois alliance are The People's Lobby Education Institute, formerly known as the Illinois-Indiana Regional Organizing Network (IIRON), Illinois People's Action (IPA), Organizing Neighborhoods for Equality: Northside (ONE Northside), and Jane Addams Senior Caucus. It is also affiliated with National People’s Action (NPA), a community organizing network that partners with labor unions and left-wing activists.

== Leadership ==
Fair Economy Illinois is led by Toby Chow. Chow is a socialist and has been affiliated with a number of other left-wing groups including IIRON, National People’s Action, People’s Lobby and Southsiders Organized for Unity and Liberation. He participated in Occupy Chicago, an offshoot of Occupy Wall Street. Chow was a panelist at the International Socialist Organization’s Socialism 2015 conference and has advocated for “class war.”
