= Constance L. Rice =

American civil rights activist and lawyer

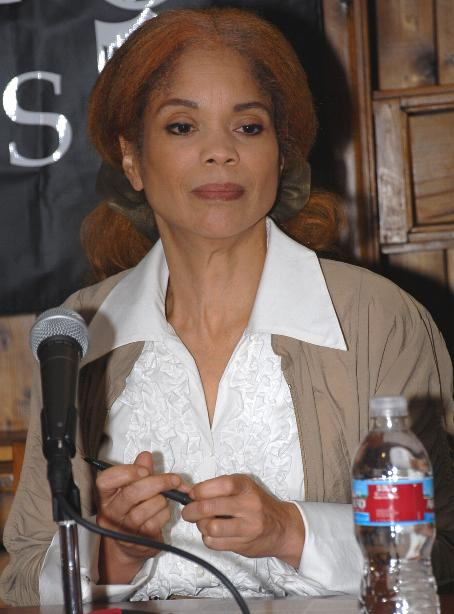
- Rice in 2007
- Born: April 5, 1956 (age 70); Washington, D.C., U.S.
- Education: Harvard University; New York University
- Occupation: Civil rights attorney
- Political party: Independent

Constance L. "Connie" Rice (born April 5, 1956) is an American civil rights activist and lawyer. She is also the co-founder and co-director of the Advancement Project in Los Angeles. She has received more than 50 major awards for her work in expanding opportunity and advancing multi-racial democracy. She is a second cousin of former U.S. Secretary of State Condoleezza Rice.

== Biography ==
=== Early years ===
Rice was born in Washington, D.C. She earned her undergraduate degree at Harvard College in 1978. She won the Root Tilden Public Interest Scholarship to New York University School of Law, where she earned her Juris Doctor in 1984.

After law school, Rice served as law clerk to the Honorable Damon J. Keith, judge of the United States Court of Appeals for the Sixth Circuit, and worked at Morrison & Foerster as a litigation associate. In 1991, she joined the NAACP Legal Defense Fund and became co-director of LDF’s Los Angeles Office in 1996.

=== Career ===
In her non-litigation work in the 1990s, Rice served as counsel to the Watts gang truce and spearheaded a statewide campaign to save equal opportunity programs. Mayors Tom Bradley and Richard Riordan appointed Rice to the governing board of Los Angeles’ Department of Water and Power where she served as president and enacted contracting reforms and environmental advances. In 1998, Rice helped lead a successful campaign to place aggressive public school reformers on the governing board for Los Angeles’ public schools.

As a litigator, Rice has filed class action civil rights cases redressing police misconduct, race and sex discrimination and unfair public policy in transportation, probation and public housing. She filed a landmark case on behalf of the Bus Riders Union that resulted in a mandate that more than $2 billion be spent to improve the Los Angeles bus system. In 1999, Rice launched a coalition lawsuit that won $750 million for new school construction in Los Angeles - money previously slated for less crowded, more affluent suburban school districts. In these and other cases, Rice has led multi-racial coalitions of lawyers and clients to win more than $4 billion of injunctive relief and damages.

In 2013, Rice participated in an internal review of the Los Angeles Police Department terminating the employment of Christopher Dorner. After a lengthy review of the LAPD's process, Rice concluded that Dorner's allegations of racism and bias were unfounded and that the firing was justified.

She has also provided commentaries for NPR.

== Honors ==
In 1998, the Los Angeles Times designated her one of twenty-four leaders considered the "most experienced, civic-minded and thoughtful people on the subject of Los Angeles." And in October 2000, California Lawbusiness named her, along with California Governor Gray Davis and Warren Christopher, as one of California’s top 10 most influential lawyers. In May 2003, Rice received an honorary doctor of laws degree from Occidental College. In May 2014, she also received an honorary doctor of laws degree from Pepperdine University.
