= Moral Mondays Illinois =

Moral Mondays Illinois is a series of protests modeled after similar Moral Monday demonstrations that took place in North Carolina. The demonstrations are organized by Fair Economy Illinois and led by clergy members. Moral Mondays Illinois protesters "demand that Illinois' elected officials tax corporations and the rich in order to fix the state's gaping budget deficit" rather than the budget cuts proposed by Illinois Governor Bruce Rauner.

Moral Monday Illinois protesters use tactics like civil disobedience and street theater to urge the governor to raise taxes on the wealthy instead of cutting public services. While the North Carolina protests took place outside public buildings, Illinois Moral Mondays target the homes and businesses of individuals who donated to Rauner's campaign.

== Protests ==
Seven Moral Mondays Illinois protests took place in the summer of 2015. The protesters typically met at James R. Thompson Center before they marched or were bussed to the offices or homes of individuals who donated money to Rauner's campaign. Dozens of protesters were arrested or issued citations by police.

=== May 18 ===
Protesters gathered in front of the Chicago Board of Trade Building. About a dozen protesters were arrested and cited with "failure to exercise due care" for blocking traffic.

=== June 1 ===
Protester blocked traffic in the Chicago Loop, the city's central business district during rush hour. According to a local news report, police detained some protesters and removed them from the street.

=== June 15 ===
Protesters marched to Riverside Plaza, the office building of investor and Rauner campaign donor Sam Zell. Police arrested seven activists for criminal trespassing and issued 21 citations to activists who sat down in the street to block traffic.

=== June 29 ===
Protesters marched from James R. Thompson Center to the office building of another campaign Rauner donor, Kenneth C. Griffin. At least eight protesters were arrested for criminal trespassing.

=== July 13 ===
Protesters stormed the lobby of Morningstar, Inc. because its CEO also donated to Rauner's campaign. Police issued six citations to protesters for trespassing. Fair Economy Illinois leader Toby Chow called the proposed budget cuts "racist" and said they would "kill the poor and vulnerable people in our state."

=== July 27 ===
About two dozen activists organized by Illinois People's Action protested against fossil fuel use and state budget cuts at the Illinois Coal Association. At the protest, Illinois People's Action leader said, "We have to slam on the brakes and that means an end to the use of fossil fuels. All of them."

=== August 10 ===
After convening at the James R. Thompson Center, protesters were bussed to the home of Elizabeth Christie, who also contributed to Rauner's campaign, in Chicago's Uptown neighborhood. While outside her home, protesters chanted, "Christie, Christie, you can't hide. We can see your greedy side."

=== November 2 ===
About 40 protesters blocked the entrances to the Chicago Board of Trade while several hundred others protested nearby. Those blocking the entrances were arrested. The protesters were asking for the implementation of the LaSalle Street Tax, a local financial transaction tax levied on trading at the institution.
