= Mac Cummings =

American businessman (born 1979)

- Born: MacLaren Cummings; January 23, 1979 (age 47)
- Education: Cornell University
- Occupation: CEO of Terakeet

MacLaren "Mac" Thompson Cummings (born January 23, 1979) is an American entrepreneur and co-founder of Terakeet, a brand reputation management firm.

== Education ==
Cummings was raised in Tully, New York. He attended Manlius Pebble Hill High School in DeWitt, NY. After graduating from high school, Cummings attended Cornell University, where he received his Bachelor of Science degree from the School of Industrial and Labor Relations in 2001.

== Career ==
In 1998, Cummings launched Mindshark Software and Consulting from his Cornell University dorm room and served as CEO. Cummings led Mindshark to several software agreements with clients such as Forbes and General Electric.

=== Terakeet ===
In 2001, Cummings co-founded Terakeet Corporation with business partner, Patrick Danial. Terakeet was founded as voice-recognition software for call centers. It received $600,000 from angel investors, but the company didn't turn a profit so it pivoted to search engine optimization and online reputation management in 2004.

In 2013, Cummings and Danial created Earned Visibility, Inc. and established Terakeet LLC as a subsidiary. Terakeet grew from 75 employees in 2013 to 175 employees in 2015, earning the firm recognition as one of the fastest-growing companies in America, according to Inc. Magazine. The company has over 400 employees and estimated revenue of $100M as of 2022. Fortune magazine named Terakeet one of the best places to work in 2017, 2020, 2021, and 2022.

Cummings ranked first in New York and ninth in the US on Glassdoor's 2021 Top CEOs for Small and Medium-Sized Businesses list. In 2022, Ernst & Young named Cummings the New York Entrepreneur of the Year. In 2023, Cummings sold Terakeet subsidiary Perlu, LLC, an influencer marketing technology platform, to Publicis Group.

In May 2026, the New York Times reported that in April 2024, Terakeet had been hired by Goldman Sachs to perform online reputation management work for the firm, CEO David M. Solomon, and general counsel Kathryn Ruemmler to help downplay her involvement with Jeffrey Epstein prior to the release of the Epstein files. The article reported that Terakeet’s fees range from $5 to $10 million annually.

== Politics ==
Cummings has been active in local and national politics and has been consulted for fundraising strategies on the technology and web side of campaigns. Cummings served as Director of Internet Finance for Hillary Clinton’s presidential bid from February to June 2008. Hillary Clinton's campaign chairman Terry McAuliffe sought Cummings out to work on the campaign, first as a consultant, then as part of the campaign team after Cummings organized a fundraiser in Syracuse, McAuliffe’s home town. After the Clinton campaign suspended in 2008, Cummings and Terakeet were selected to advise the Obama digital team on its content, blogging, and SEO strategies. After the successful election of Barack Obama in 2008, Terakeet again was solicited to provide technology consulting to the campaign and its technical team. In 2013, Cummings advised then businessman and friend Terry McAuliffe on his run for Governor of Virginia. In 2016, Cummings and Terakeet were brought in during the last weeks of Hillary Clinton's presidential campaign, Hillary for America, to reach out to battleground states in a small role. In 2021, Cummings and his wife, Rochelle, hosted President Bill Clinton at their home in Skaneateles, NY.
