= Kathryn Ruemmler =

American lawyer (born 1971)

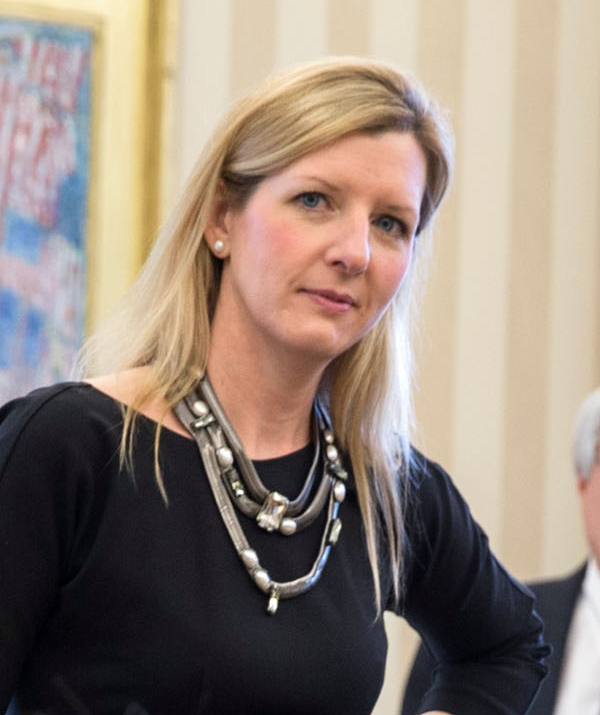
- Ruemmler in 2013

White House Counsel
- In office June 30, 2011 – June 2, 2014
- President: Barack Obama
- Preceded by: Robert Bauer
- Succeeded by: Neil Eggleston

Personal details
- Born: April 19, 1971 (age 55) Richland, Washington, U.S.
- Party: Democratic
- Education: University of Washington (BA); Georgetown University (JD)

Kathryn Helen Ruemmler (born April 19, 1971) is an American attorney who was principal deputy White House counsel and then White House Counsel to President Barack Obama. Previously a partner at Latham and Watkins co-chairing its white-collar defense group, Ruemmler joined Goldman Sachs in 2020 and was Chief Legal Officer and General Counsel. She announced her resignation from this position in February 2026, effective at the end of June, over her links to child sex offender Jeffrey Epstein.

== Early life and education ==
Her parents moved to Richland, Washington in 1969, and she was born there in 1971. Her father was a computer engineer, working in the Hanford area, and her mother worked at Battelle, a research laboratory. Both parents worked in "nuclear issues ... all government contract and classified". Her father died in 2012, after which her mother moved to Scottsdale, Arizona.

A graduate of Richland High School in Richland, Ruemmler earned a bachelor's degree in English from the University of Washington, and a Juris Doctor from Georgetown University Law Center. She was editor-in-chief of the Georgetown Law Journal.

== Career ==
=== Legal career ===
Ruemmler clerked for Judge Timothy K. Lewis on the Third Circuit in 1996 and 1997. From 2000 to 2001, she was Associate Counsel to President Clinton. She worked as a federal prosecutor from 2001 to 2007, first as an Assistant United States Attorney in the District of Columbia, and finishing as a deputy director of the United States Department of Justice (DOJ)'s Enron Task Force. In 2006, she delivered the government's closing argument in the trial of former Enron executives Kenneth Lay and Jeffrey Skilling, both of whom were convicted.

Ruemmler returned to Latham in Washington, D.C., in 2007, this time as a partner.

=== Obama administration ===
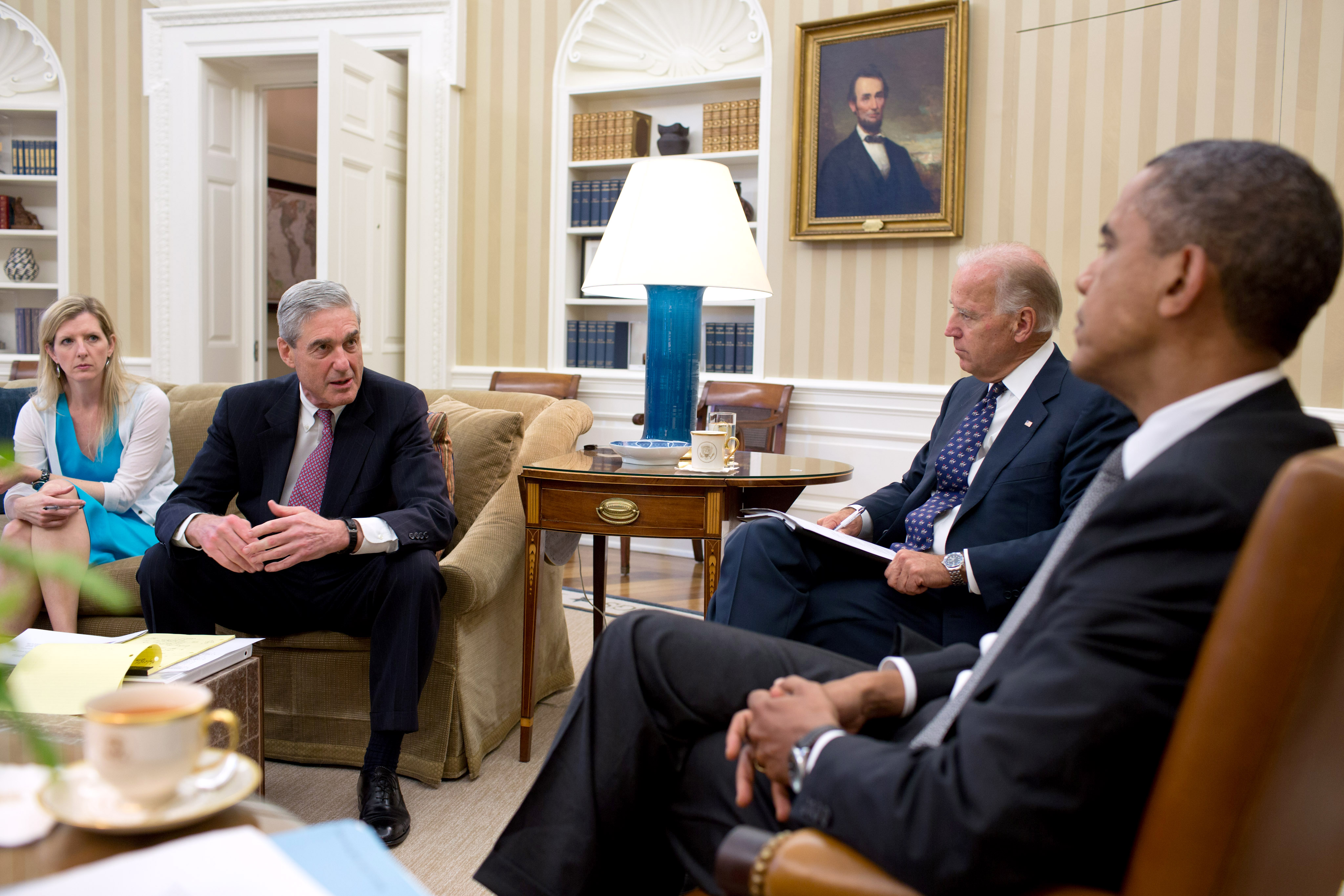
President Obama and Vice President Joe Biden meet with Ruemmler and FBI Director Robert Mueller in the Oval Office to discuss the shootings in Aurora, Colorado, July 20, 2012.

Ruemmler joined the Obama administration in January 2009 as principal associate deputy attorney general at the DOJ. She was promoted to White House Counsel in 2011 following the departure of Robert F. Bauer.

In October 2011, Ruemmler said there was no evidence of the White House intervening in Solyndra's loan guarantee to benefit a campaign donor. Her letter to the House Energy and Commerce Committee refused to allow committee Republicans to get access to internal White House communications. The letter denied Republican claims of improper White House influence in the Energy Department's 2009 decision to grant the company a $535 million loan guarantee, and the deal's early 2011 that put private investors ahead of taxpayers for repayment if the company was liquidated.

Over what would have traditionally been the 2011-2012 winter recess of the 112th Congress, the House of Representatives did not assent to recess, specifically to block a recess appointment of Richard Cordray as Director of the Consumer Financial Protection Bureau. As a result, both the House and Senate held pro forma sessions. On January 4, 2012, President Obama claimed authority to appoint Cordray and others under the Recess Appointments Clause. Ruemmler asserted that the appointments were valid, because the pro forma sessions were designed to, "through form, render a constitutional power of the executive obsolete," and that the Senate was for all intents and purposes recessed. Republicans in the Senate disputed the appointments, with Senate Minority Leader Mitch McConnell stating that Obama had "arrogantly circumvented the American people" and endangered "the Congress's role in providing a check on the excesses of the executive branch". It was expected that there would be a legal challenge to the appointments.

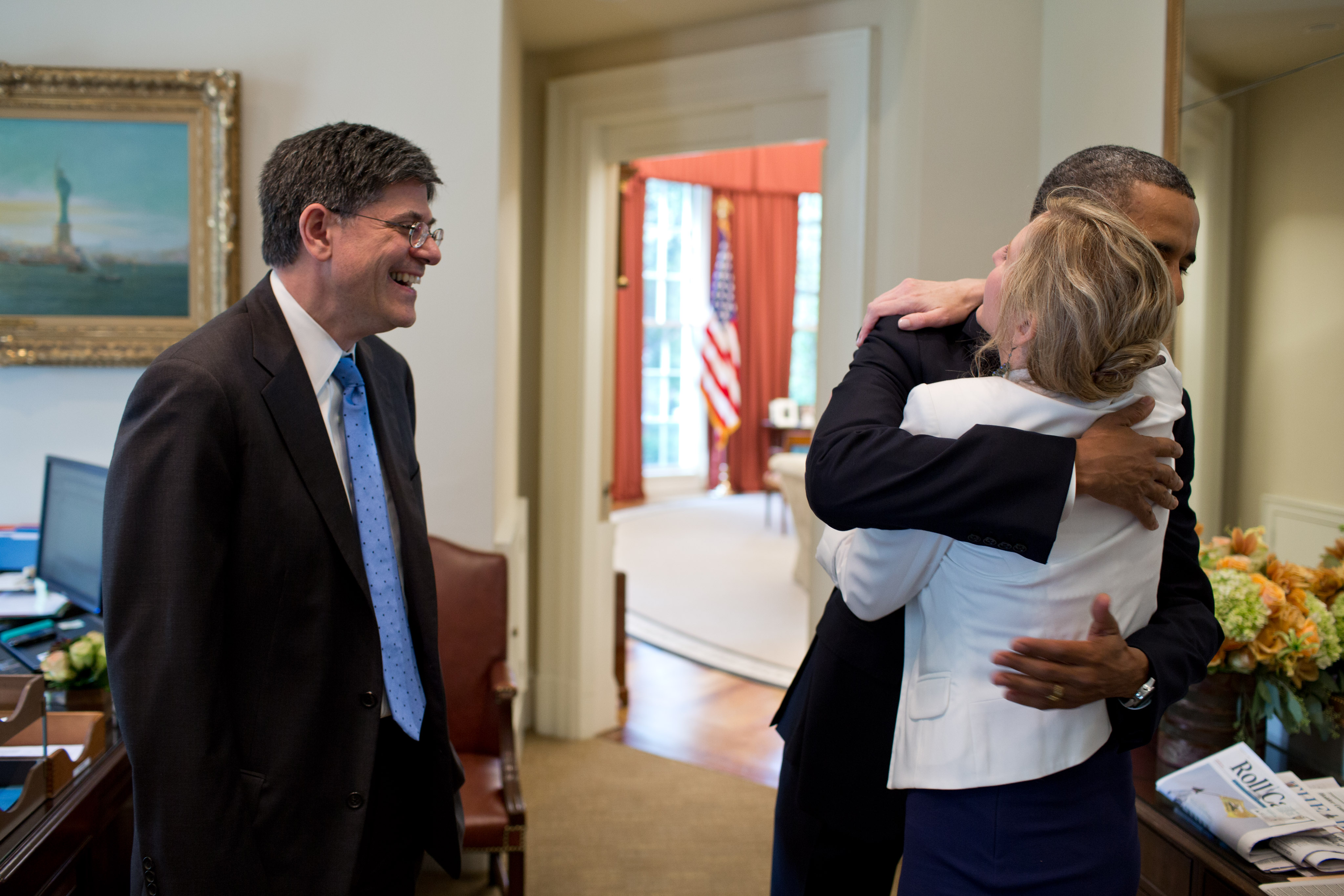
Obama hugs Ruemmler following the Supreme Court ruling on National Federation of Independent Business v. Sebelius.

On January 6, 2012, the DOJ's Office of Legal Counsel issued an opinion regarding recess appointments and pro forma sessions, stating that "[t]he convening of periodic pro forma sessions in which no business is to be conducted does not have the legal effect of interrupting an intrasession recess otherwise long enough to qualify as a 'Recess of the Senate' under the Recess Appointments Clause. In this context, the President therefore has discretion to conclude that the Senate is unavailable to perform its advise-and-consent function and to exercise his power to make recess appointments."

After the Supreme Court decided National Federation of Independent Business v. Sebelius mostly in favor of the Obama administration on June 28, 2012, Ruemmler was the one to inform Obama and his chief of staff, Jack Lew, that the administration's signature Affordable Care Act legislation had mostly been upheld.

In a profile by the Washington Post, it was reported that during negotiations over John Brennan's confirmation as CIA director, according to a White House official, it was Ruemmler who decided that the House and Senate intelligence panels could review the emails about different drafts of the Benghazi talking points without letting them take copies. The administration shifted course in May 2013 by releasing the emails after weeks of controversy over their content.

=== Post-government ===
Ruemmler announced that she would be stepping down as White House Counsel in mid-May 2014; she returned to private practice in July 2014.

In September 2014, when Attorney General Eric Holder announced his intention to step down, Ruemmler was speculated as being a potential candidate as the next United States Attorney General. She withdrew from consideration the following month, amid speculation that she would have faced a "difficult confirmation process" because of her close friendship with President Obama.

In 2020, Ruemmler joined Goldman Sachs as a partner, and Global Head of Regulatory Affairs; in 2021 she was promoted to Chief Legal Officer and General Counsel. She was on the firmwide Management Committee.

Ruemmler was named to the FINRA Board of Governors in 2021, a part-time position. Her term as a member of FINRA Board of Governors expired in August 2023.

== Personal life ==
Design firm Ashe Leandro created a line of furniture named after Ruemmler called "Ruemmler." She is a client of the firm, and the line contains piecemeal elements made of wood (often French oak), leather, silk, and steel.

=== Relationship with Jeffrey Epstein ===
After departing her White House counsel position and while once again employed as a partner at Latham & Watkins, Ruemmler was a close associate of and met with Jeffrey Epstein on dozens of occasions between July 2014 and May 2019 according to his schedule, well after he had been convicted of procuring a child for prostitution and of soliciting a prostitute. These meetings included "lunches and dinners with celebrities, apartment hunting, and personal beauty appointments." She was on his schedule for a flight to Paris in 2015 as well as a stop at his home in the U.S. Virgin Islands in 2017 but denied that these trips happened, and The Wall Street Journal could not confirm whether they did. She said in 2023: "I regret ever knowing Jeffrey Epstein."

In an email of January 8, 2015 to Epstein, Ruemmler bragged about having received the CIA Agency Medal.

Ruemmler was listed as a backup executor in a January 2019 version of Jeffrey Epstein’s will, a disclosure from Congress showed on September 8, 2025. She maintained an email correspondence with Epstein from 2014 to 2018, at times soliciting his advice regarding a prospective job offer or sharing musings about ordinary Americans, as revealed in emails released by the House Oversight Committee in November 2025.

Ruemmler called Epstein "wonderful Jeffrey," "sweetie," and "Uncle Jeffrey," and wrote "I adore him" in a December 2015 email exchange which appears to show Epstein booking and paying for a first-class trip to Europe. In other back-and-forth messages with Epstein, Ruemmler expressed gratitude for her "friendship" with Epstein as well as concluding her messages with "xo" and "xoxo." Other emails show her asking Epstein to help her land a job with Facebook and giving him advice as to how to respond to the coverage that his crimes were receiving in media. She also conveyed to Epstein that she was romantically involved with a married associate of his. Epstein gave Ruemmler a $9,400 Hermès bag and a gift card for the spa at Four Seasons in Washington, D.C.. In November 2018, Epstein gifted to Ruemmler a Hermes branded Apple Watch, with a retail price of $1,300. Ruemmler replied "so sweet of Jeffrey." "I would love the 40 mm, stainless Hermes with bleu indigo swift leather double tour." Epstein made the connections to Eva Andersson-Dubin at Dubin Breast Center at Mount Sinai for Reummler to get her mammograms done. Epstein called Ruemmler the night he was arrested in 2019 according to notes taken by law enforcement.

Ruemmler announced her resignation from Goldman Sachs on February 12, 2026, effective at the end of June 2026, after her Epstein connections were publicly disclosed. Ruemmler was paid $22.5 million by Goldman Sachs in 2024. Her pay package was increased to $25 million in 2025.

On March 3, 2026, Ruemmler was asked to testify by United States House Committee on Oversight and Government Reform in their investigation of Epstein's crimes.

Ruemmler sat for a closed-door transcribed interview with the committee on July 15, 2026, and the committee released the 171-page transcript on July 29. In an opening statement, Ruemmler said that Epstein had never been her client, that he had cold-called her at Latham & Watkins in July 2014, and that she had met him about 20 times between 2014 and 2019. She said she had been aware of his 2008 guilty plea but had accepted his account that he had not known that any of the women he solicited were underage, and stated: "I did not see any evidence of ongoing criminal conduct or misconduct of any kind by Mr. Epstein during the time I dealt with him. Second, if I had seen or heard any evidence suggesting that he was abusing women or girls, I would have immediately reported him to law enforcement." She described Epstein as "a masterful liar" who "used me and other respectable people to legitimize his standing", and said she regretted ever having dealt with him. Ruemmler told the committee that clients Epstein had referred to her, among them Ariane de Rothschild, generated "single-digit millions" in billings for Latham & Watkins. Asked about emails in which she had referred to sexualized massages and to trafficking women, she said they had been jokes about Epstein's prior conviction rather than about his conduct, describing one as "an offhanded joke that, certainly sitting here in 2026, is in extraordinarily poor taste", and denied that it referred to how he had procured victims. She said she had understood him to have been a customer, or "john", who paid for sex with women he believed to be adults, and agreed under questioning that a minor cannot consent to prostitution.

Asked whether she believed that Virginia Giuffre had been a victim of Epstein and Ghislaine Maxwell, Ruemmler answered "I don't know", and added: "If she says that she was, I don't have a reason to doubt that. However, there were allegations that she made that were, I believed based on my experience as a former prosecutor and as a defense counsel, that were of such a nature that they were—they lacked inherent credibility." Giuffre's brother and sister-in-law, Sky and Amanda Roberts, called the remark "reprehensible" and said that "the only person who lacks credibility is Kathy Ruemmler". Jami Schlicher, a representative for Ruemmler, said that she had not been "broadly dismissing Virginia Giuffre's allegations" but was responding to a discussion of specific claims.

In April 2024, Goldman Sachs hired reputation management firm Terakeet to help burnish Ruemmler's reputation. Over the next 20 months, the firm created and posted positive online content to counter negative coverage of Ruemmler's friendship with Epstein, as documented in the Epstein files, where her name was mentioned over 10,000 times.

Legal offices
Preceded by Bob Bauer	White House Counsel; 2011–2014	Succeeded by Neil Eggleston
