= Penda Hair =

American lawyer

- Born: United States
- Occupation: Civil rights advocate

Penda D. Hair is an American lawyer. She is the Legal Director of Forward Justice, a law, policy, and strategy center dedicated to advancing racial, social, and economic justice in the U.S. South. A frequent television and radio commentator, she speaks regularly on issues of race and democracy. Previously, she was a founding co-director of the civil rights group Advancement Project.

== Background ==
Hair received her B.A. degree from the University of Tennessee and her J.D. degree from Harvard Law School, where she served as an editor of the Harvard Law Review. After law school, she clerked for U.S. Court of Appeals Judge Wilfred Feinberg. She then clerked for U.S. Supreme Court Justice Harry A. Blackmun. From 1982 to 1999, Hair served as staff lawyer and, later, the director of the Washington, D.C. office of the NAACP Legal Defense and Educational Fund before founding Advancement Project.

She is also the author of the Rockefeller Foundation’s report on community lawyering, Louder Than Words: Lawyers, Communities, and the Struggle for Justice (2001).

== History with Advancement Project ==
Hair co-founded Advancement Project in 1999 with several peers, many formerly of the NAACP Legal Defense and Educational Fund. They created the nonprofit to serve as a new, innovative racial justice organization that works to eradicate structural inequities by providing legal, communications and organizing support for community-based grassroots groups, to build and strengthen their capacity.

At Advancement Project, Hair managed a team of voting rights attorneys and helped oversee the organization's voter protection work. She also worked alongside attorney and advocate, Judith Browne Dianis, her fellow co-director at Advancement Project.

Under Hair's direction, Advancement Project spearheaded litigation challenging voting restrictions, discriminatory electoral provisions and other civil rights violations across the nation. Hair fought against the disenfranchisement of African-American voters during the 2000 presidential election in Florida, investigating black voters who had found difficulty voting due to being wrongly listed as ineligible to vote. She has also campaigned for the restoration of voting rights of people with felony convictions in Virginia. In the 2008 and 2012 elections, Hair spearheaded campaigns challenging voter ID restrictions and other discriminatory electoral provisions.

While she was active in voter protection before her time with Advancement Project, Hair has been vigilant in the most recent wave of voter suppression tactics, many which emerged in 2011 and have spread further since the U.S. Supreme Court's decision on Shelby. The ruling removed preclearance of new, potentially problematic voting laws for several states that had historically used voter suppression tactics on communities of color. Since the ruling, Hair has served as counsel in cases challenging photo ID requirements in Pennsylvania and Wisconsin, as well as litigation challenging a recently passed voting measure in North Carolina.

Under Hair's leadership, Advancement Project produced many reports on voter suppression, including What’s Wrong with This Picture?: New Photo ID Proposals Part of National Push to Turn Back the Clock. (2011); Segregating American Citizenship: Latino Voter Disenfranchisement (2012); and The Time Tax: America’s Newest Form of Voter Suppression for Millennials (2013)

== Personal ==
Hair is married to W. Neil Eggleston, White House Counsel under President Barack Obama. They have two children.

== See also ==
- List of law clerks for the second seat of the Supreme Court of the United States

== Selected articles ==
- Hair, Penda D.; Jealous, Benjamin Todd (February 26, 2013). "Don't gut the Voting Rights Act". CNN.
- Hair, Penda D. (1994). "Justice Blackmun and Racial Justice". Yale Law Journal. 104 (1): 7–22.
