= 2020–21 United States election protests =

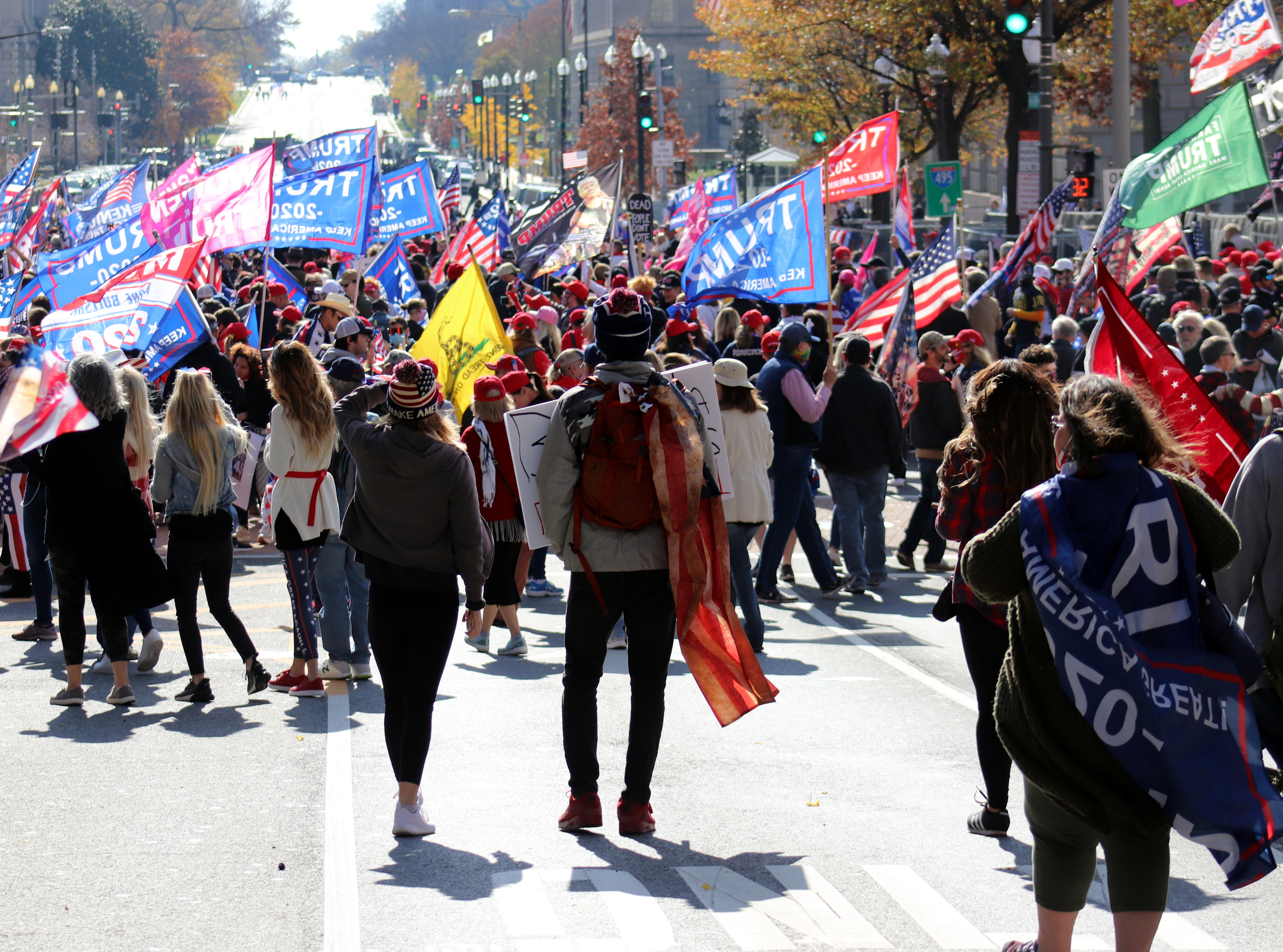
- Pro-Trump march to protest the election results in Washington, D.C., on November 14, 2020
- Date: November 4, 2020 – April 11, 2021 (5 months and 1 week)
- Caused by: False claims of electoral fraud made by Donald Trump
- Goals: Overturn 2020 presidential election results
- Methods: Civil disobedience; Demonstrations; IEDs; Online activism
- Result: Attempts to overturn the election of Joe Biden fail.; January 6 United States Capitol attack; Congress certifies Biden's victory.; Donald Trump acknowledges his electoral defeat and formally condemns United States Capitol attack.; Twitter suspends Donald Trump's account; Stripe stops processing donations to Trump campaign.; House Democrats introduce articles of impeachment for Trump on Monday, January 11, 2021 and urge Vice President Mike Pence to invoke 25th amendment to remove Trump from office.; The House of Representatives impeach Donald Trump again, making him the first US president to be impeached twice.; Joe Biden becomes President; The Senate acquits Donald Trump in his impeachment trial making him the first president to be acquitted twice.; Protests continue into the Biden presidency; A federal grand jury indicts Donald Trump

Casualties
- Arrested: 1,000+

Protests began in multiple cities in the United States following the 2020 United States presidential election between then-president Donald Trump and Democratic Party challenger Vice President Joe Biden, held on November 3, 2020. Biden won the election, receiving 81.3 million votes (51.3%) to Trump's 74.2 million (46.9%) and winning the Electoral College by 306 to 232. Biden's victory became clear on November 7, after the ballots (including mail-in ballots) had been tabulated. The Electoral College voted on December 14, in accordance with law, formalizing Biden's victory.

Before and after the election, Trump, his presidential campaign, and his allies challenged the legitimacy of the election and falsely claimed widespread electoral fraud. Trump and his allies filed dozens of legal challenges to the results, which were rejected by at least 86 judges from across the political spectrum, in both the state and federal courts, including by federal judges appointed by Trump himself. The courts found that his claims had no factual or legal basis. His unsubstantiated allegations of widespread voting fraud were also refuted by state election officials.

Pro-Trump protesters, including groups such as the Proud Boys, engaged in multiple demonstrations in Washington, D.C., state capitols, and other locations nationwide protesting the election results and echoing Trump's false claims of election fraud. In November and December 2020, there were nighttime clashes and street scuffles in Washington, D.C. between Trump supporters who refused to accept the president's defeat, including the Proud Boys, and counterprotesters.

On January 6—the day when Congress formally counts the electoral votes—Trump supporters gathered for the "Save America" rally where attendees heard speeches from President Trump and his personal lawyer, former New York City mayor Rudy Giuliani. Before the speeches were over, a mob of protesters marched on Congress and stormed the Capitol building. Congress was in session at the time, certifying the Electoral College vote count. Several buildings in the U.S. Capitol Complex were evacuated, and protesters broke past security to enter the U.S. Capitol building, including National Statuary Hall. All buildings in the Capitol complex were subsequently locked down. There was reportedly an armed standoff at the doors to the House chambers, one person was shot within the Capitol building, and one Capitol Police officer died after having a stroke the next day. At least two improvised explosive devices were found.

In the aftermath of the storming of the U.S. Capitol, at least 36 House Democrats called for Trump's immediate impeachment and removal by Congress. State-level officials including Maryland lieutenant governor Boyd Rutherford supported impeachment, and representatives called on Vice President Mike Pence to remove Trump via the Twenty-fifth Amendment to the United States Constitution. Trump continued to face backlash in the days following and, due to his use of social media to encourage his supporters' protests and violence, was eventually restricted or banned from most online platforms including YouTube, Facebook, Instagram, and his preferred Twitter.

Armed supporters of Trump have continued protesting in the aftermath of the storming of the US Capitol. In the lead-up to the inauguration ceremony for President Biden, thousands of National Guard troops were dispatched to the capital, with up to 25,000 present on inauguration day.

== Causes ==
In remarks from the White House in the early hours of November 4, President Donald Trump alleged, without presenting evidence, that "fraud" was being committed during vote counting efforts and remarked, "We will win this. As far as I'm concerned, we already have won." Some major networks conducted live fact-checking and interrupted the president's speech while others offered uninterrupted coverage. Former White House Chief Strategist Steve Bannon suggested that Trump begin his second term of office by ordering the executions of Dr. Anthony Fauci and FBI Director Christopher A. Wray as "a warning to federal bureaucrats".

Political observers had suggested the possibility of a contested election and premature claim of victory by Trump in the months before of the election. This expectation was based on the likelihood that initial votes counted on election night would skew heavily Republican while mail-in ballots would skew heavily Democratic, a blue shift that became more favorable to Biden as more votes were counted and could be misrepresented as fraudulent.

== Pro-Trump protests ==
Pro-Trump events related to the election outcome have taken place around the country beginning on November 4.

=== November 2020 ===
==== November 4 ====
- In Phoenix, Arizona, pro-Trump protesters gathered to demand the city's remaining ballots be counted. Numerous other protests occurred that day in major cities including Los Angeles, Seattle, Houston, Pittsburgh, Minneapolis and San Diego, some about the election and some about racial inequality in the country.

==== November 5 ====
- Facebook banned a group page called "Stop the Steal", which Trump supporters used to organize protests against the election results after his allegations of electoral fraud. It achieved 300,000 followers before Facebook shut it down, citing calls for violence by some participants. It was reported to have been adding a thousand new members every ten seconds.
- In Atlanta, while poll workers inside State Farm Arena counted ballots, pro-Trump protesters gathered outside chanting "Stop the cheat!"

==== November 6 ====
- In Detroit, more than 200 protesters, some of whom were armed, rallied outside the tally room at TCF Center as Biden and Kamala Harris took the lead in the vote count for the state. Phil Robinson, founder of Michigan Liberty Militia, which has been deemed an "extreme anti-government group" by the Southern Poverty Law Center, said he was at the rally to fight "tyranny and fraud."
- In Youngstown, Ohio, about fifty pro-Trump protesters rallied outside the WKBN TV news station.
- Pro-Trump protests were held in Arizona, Pennsylvania, and Michigan. In Arizona, far-right conspiracy theorist Alex Jones called on protesters to "surround the White House and support the President".

==== November 7 ====
- In Little Rock, Arkansas, a group of about fifty Trump supporters, many of whom were armed, were met with a smaller group of counter-protesters at the State Capitol building.
- In North Las Vegas, a hundred Trump supporters demonstrated outside the Clark County Election Department.
- In Lansing, more than five hundred Trump supporters protested the election results at the state Capitol.
- In Raleigh, North Carolina, Ryan Fournier led "Stop the Steal" rallies at Halifax Mall and the North Carolina Executive Mansion. Counter-protesters debated Trump supporters and transformed "Stop the Steal" into a party at Halifax Mall.
- In Salem, Oregon, two separate protests were seen with participants questioning the results of the election. Four people were arrested during the protests.

==== November 8 ====
- In Phoenix, Arizona, hundreds of Trump supporters, many of whom were armed, protested Biden's victory, claiming that the Democratic Party had stolen the election. There were also small groups of counter-protesters.
- In Austintown, Ohio, hundreds of pro-Trump protesters rallied outside local businesses with the intention of marching towards the local Walmart.

==== November 14 ====
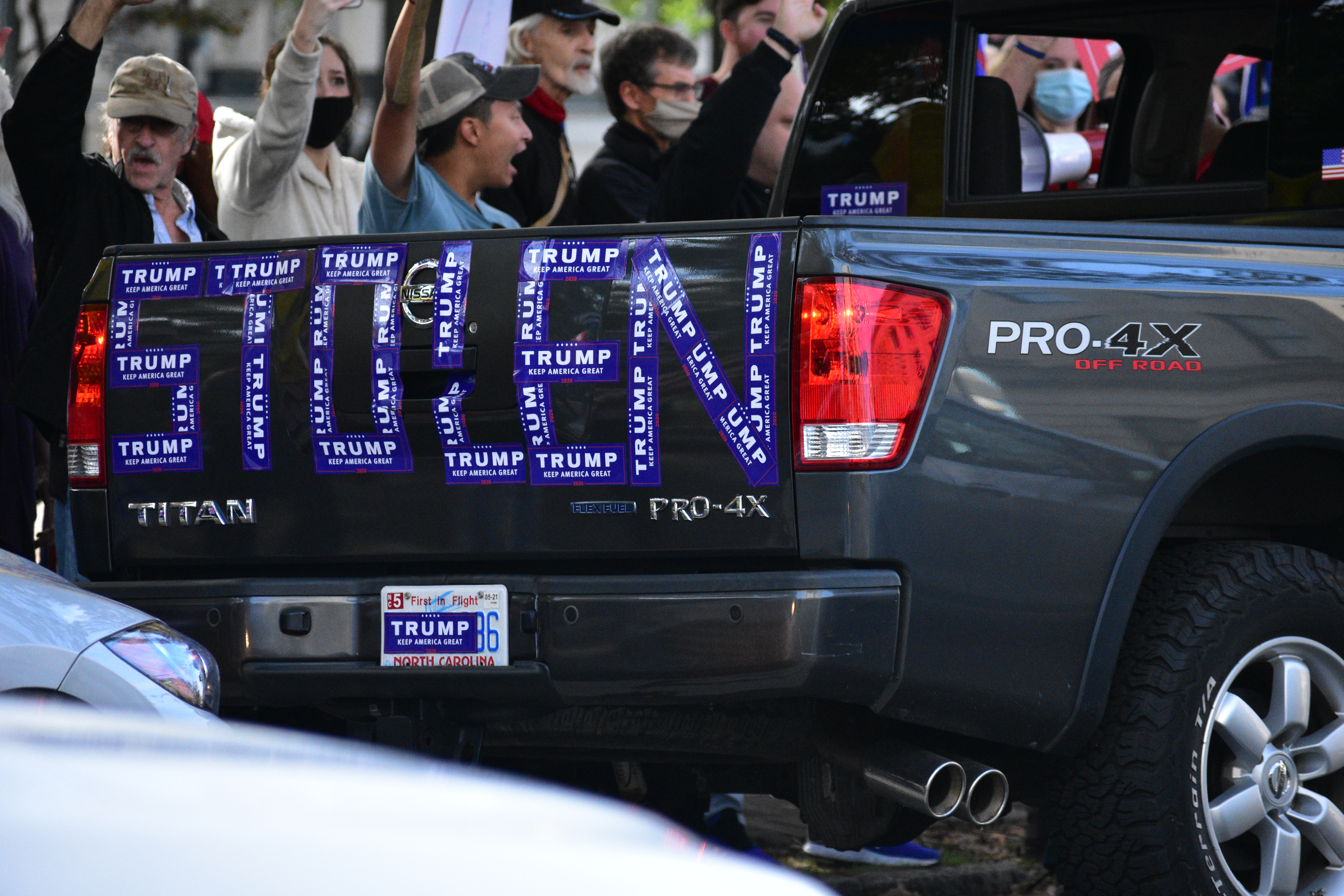
Pro-Trump protesters in Raleigh, November 14, 2020

- In Washington, D.C., thousands of protesters rallied to support President Trump's election claims. Attendees included white nationalists and members of far-right groups such as the Proud Boys, with some wearing helmets and bullet-proof vests. Some Republican members of Congress also attended. Demonstrators gave various names to their action, including "Million MAGA March", "Stop the Steal" rally, and "March for Trump".
  The President waved to demonstrators as his Secret Service motorcade passed Freedom Plaza on Pennsylvania Avenue during the morning before traveling to the Trump National Golf Club northwest of Washington. The D.C. Metropolitan Police Department arrested 20 people for various offenses including firearm violations, assault, assaulting a police officer, and disorderly conduct.
  After nightfall, tensions escalated between demonstrators and counter-protesters. Anti-Trump demonstrators stole and burned MAGA merchandise, tables belonging to vendors of Trump apparel were overturned, and fireworks were set off. Five blocks east of the White House, violence broke out between counter-protesters and the president's supporters, who wielded batons. The groups brawled for several minutes before police arrived and cleared the intersection. One man was stabbed in the back during the disturbance and was taken to a hospital.

==== November 15 ====
- In San Antonio, several hundred pro-Trump protesters marched through downtown San Antonio for approximately an hour. At the same time, a caravan of decorated cars drove through the city to celebrate Biden's victory.

==== November 18 ====
- Talk-show host Alex Jones and political commentator Nick Fuentes led a group of protesters in "Stop the Steal" protest in the Georgia State Capitol in Atlanta. He later called for fans to "go to the capital of Georgia now and you must surround the governor's mansion now."

==== November 21 ====
- In Sacramento, two hundred protesters attended a protest in support of the President. The protest became violent once protesters marched to Cesar Chavez Plaza, where the protest was declared an unlawful assembly due to fighting; one protestor was arrested.

==== November 22 ====
- In Charlotte, dozens of protesters organized the city's first election protest in the form of a vehicle convoy at Marshall Park.

==== November 26 ====
- In Chicago, 60 protesters held a rally in support of Trump at Millennium Park. Participants included Edgar "Remy Del Toro" Gonzalez, president of the Chicago chapter of the Proud Boys, and Back the Blue supporters. A few dozen anti-Trump activists counter-protested.

=== December 2020 ===
==== December 5 ====
- In Michigan, the Michigan Secretary of State, Jocelyn Benson tweeted that dozens of armed protesters gathered outside her home chanting "Stop the Steal" and held signs with the same message. Videos of the protest were later uploaded to social media and part of the protest was live streamed on Facebook.

==== December 12 ====
- The National Park Service granted a permit allowing a conservative organization, Women for America First, to host a gathering in Freedom Plaza in Washington, D.C., on December 12, with a projected attendance of upwards of five thousand. On the day of the event, about 200 members of the Proud Boys joined a march near the Plaza and the Trump International Hotel while dressed in combat fatigues and ballistic vests and reportedly carrying helmets. Reported antifa members were also present and both groups engaged in fights with one another later that night. In scuffles between protesters and counter-protesters, four people were stabbed and at least 23 were arrested.
  Trump acknowledged the Washington protest, tweeting "Wow! Thousands of people forming in Washington (D.C.) for Stop the Steal. Didn't know about this, but I'll be seeing them!" and drove by in a motorcade. Mike Flynn spoke to the crowds as well, stating "My charge to you is to go back to where you are from and make demands. The (U.S. Constitution) is not about collective liberty it is about individual liberties, and they designed it that way."
- Separate marches, called "Jericho marches" were pushed by church groups, and the "Stop the Steal" organization linked to Roger Stone, with marches planned in Georgia, Pennsylvania, Michigan, Wisconsin, Nevada, and Arizona.
- In Indianapolis, demonstrators at the Indiana Statehouse, including members of the Proud Boys, protested both the election results and mandatory mask rules.

==== December 19 ====
- In Sacramento, police made several arrests near the California State Capitol as pro-Trump and anti-Trump protesters clashed over the election results. Far-right groups like the Proud Boys had been protesting the results near the Capitol every weekend since the election.

=== January 2021 ===
==== January 4 ====
- Proud Boys leader Enrique Tarrio was arrested and charged with destroying a Black Lives Matter sign at Asbury United Methodist Church in Washington, D.C. during the pro-Trump rally on December 12.

==== January 5 ====
- On January 5, 2021, Washington D.C. mayor Muriel Bowser activated 340 of the District of Columbia National Guard due to an organized protest of pro-Trump supporters planning to rally that evening.

==== January 6 – Washington D.C. ====
"We're gonna walk down to the Capitol, and we're going to cheer on our brave senators and congressmen and women, and we're probably not going to be cheering so loudly for some of them, because you're never going to take back our country with weakness; you have to show strength...I know that everyone here will soon be marching over to the Capitol to peacefully and patriotically make your voices heard."

— Donald Trump, Speech at a D.C. rally shortly before the storming, January 6, 2021

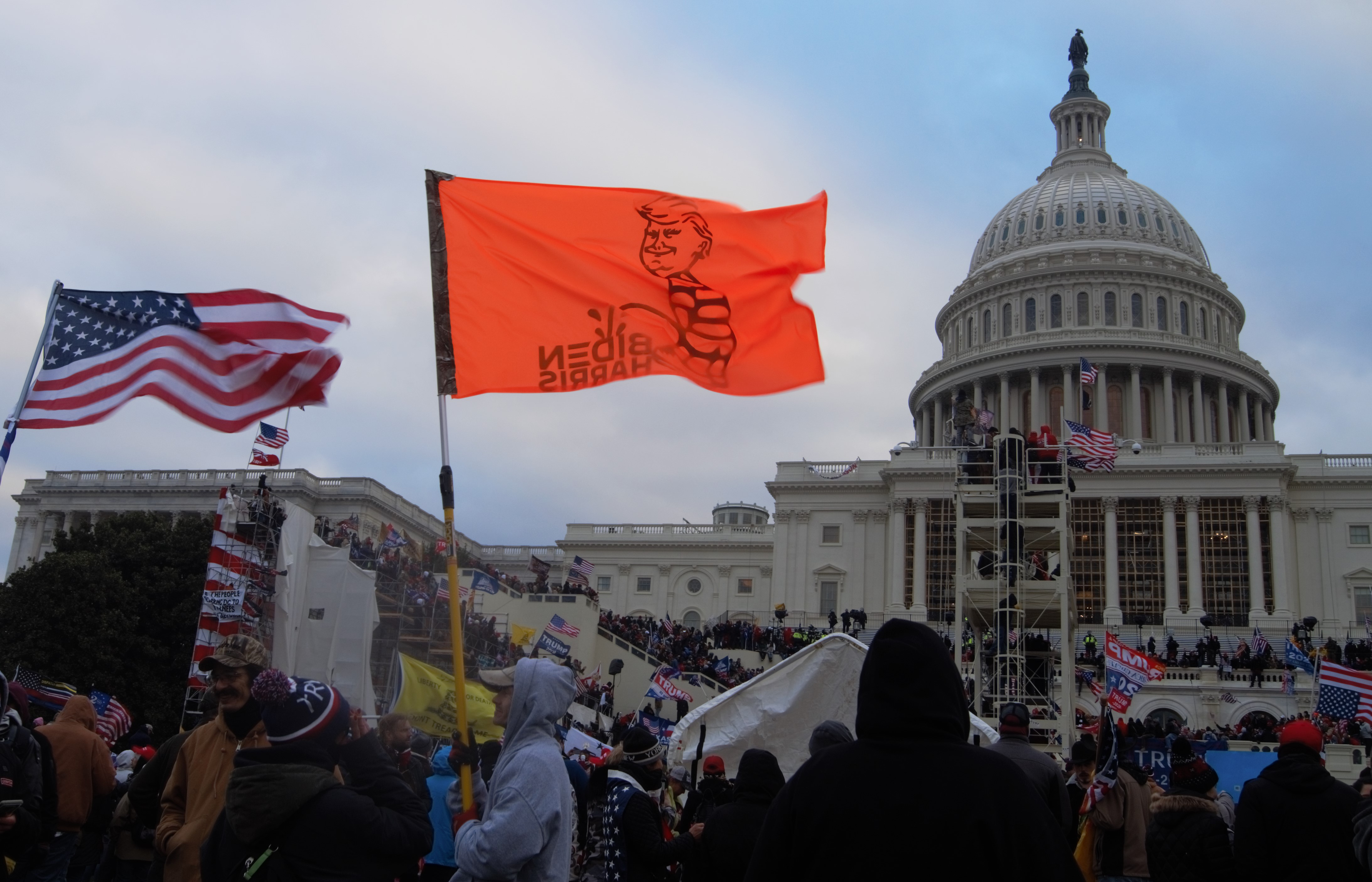
Pro-Trump protesters overrun the U.S. Capitol building, January 6, 2021.

On January 6, the protesters planned to march to the United States Capitol. President Donald Trump supported the planned protest via tweets. Mayor Bowser asked residents not participating in the protests to "avoid confrontations with anybody who's looking for a fight".

A crowd of several thousand first listened to a speech by Trump, in which he repeated his false claims that the election had been stolen and said, "We will never give up. We will never concede. ... Our country has had enough. We're not going to take it anymore." He urged them to march on the Capitol to "peacefully and patriotically make your voices heard" but also to "show strength".

Many listeners then marched on the Capitol, where they breached the barricades, broke windows, and stormed inside the Capitol building. They marched through Statuary Hall. Rioters invaded the offices of Speaker of the House Nancy Pelosi, flipping tables and ripping photos from walls; there was looting in the Capitol.

The Capitol was locked down, the Senate and House recessed from their discussions about the electoral count, and Vice President Pence was "whisked away" from the chamber. Members of Congress were told to put on gas masks after law enforcement began using tear gas within the building. ABC News reported shooting in the Capitol building and an armed standoff at the front door of the House chambers. The New York Times also said police drew their guns inside the House of Representatives chamber.

Multiple officers were injured in the mob violence at the Capitol. One died the following day, and another committed suicide over the following weekend. A woman was shot inside the Capitol by a Capitol Police officer while climbing through a broken window into the Speaker's Lobby – she later died. At least one improvised explosive device was found on Capitol grounds, and another just blocks away at the headquarters of the Republican Party.

In the aftermath of the storming of the US Capitol, more than 250 members of Congress called for Trump's immediate impeachment and removal by Congress, or by invoking the Twenty-fifth Amendment to the United States Constitution. State-level officials who have described Trump's conduct as impeachable include Maryland Lieutenant Governor Boyd Rutherford.

Congresswoman Cori Bush introduced a resolution to investigate and expel Republican House members who had supported challenging election results, asserting they had broken their oath of office. As of 25 October 2021, the resolution was still waiting to be voted on.

==== January 6 – state capitols and cities ====
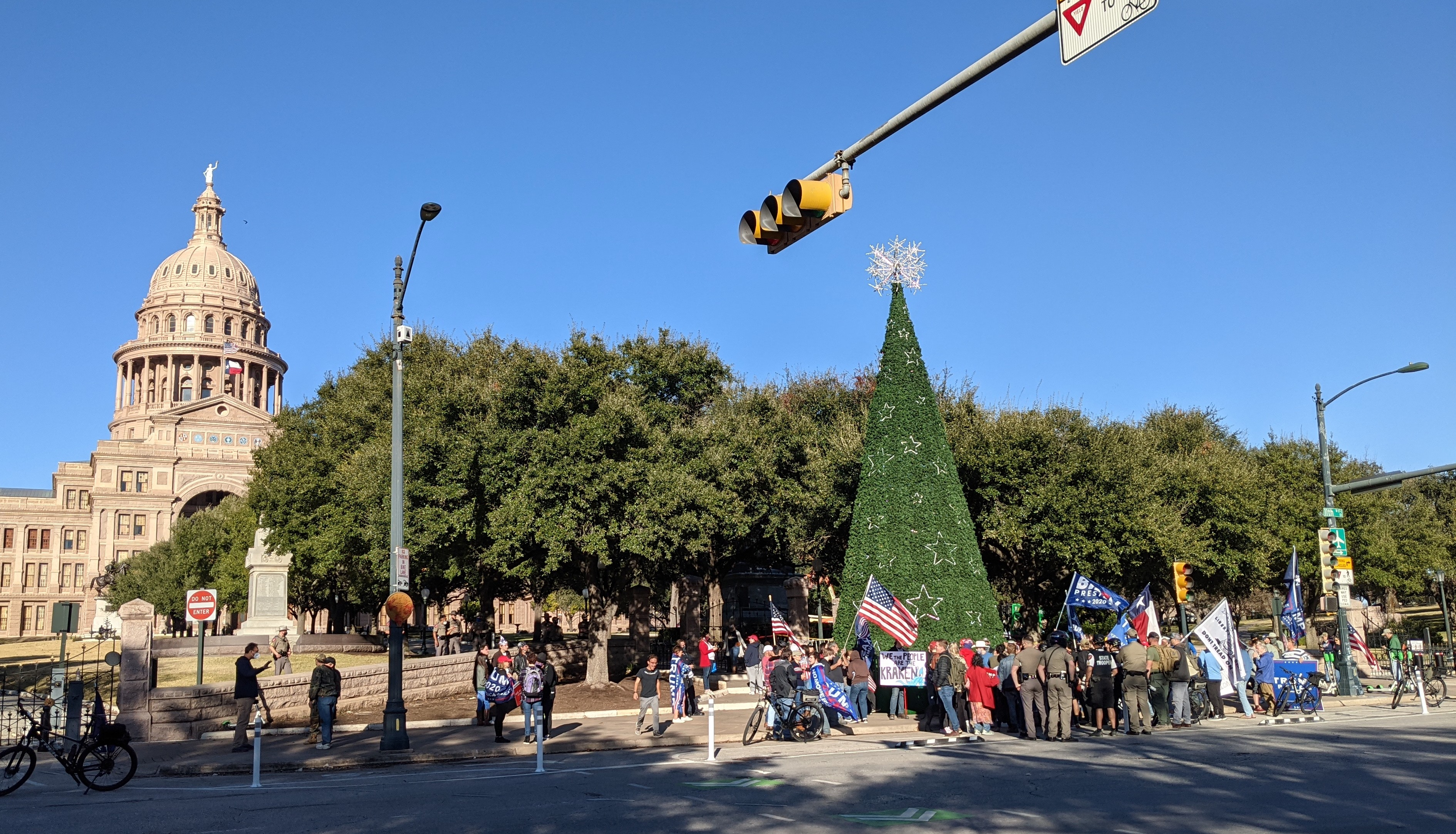
Trump supporters and police at the Texas State Capitol on January 6, 2021

A number of states experienced demonstrations and armed protests at state capitols or in the streets on January 6, numbering in dozens to hundreds of participants. Precautionary measures, such as closures of state capitols and evacuation of members and staff, were taken in several of the states in response to the events in Washington D.C. In some states the events were marked by incidents or particular security concerns.

- In California, eleven people were arrested for illegal possession of pepper spray at a demonstration near the state capitol in Sacramento. There was at least one reported assault. Several roads were closed in downtown Sacramento and some bus lines were suspended, with more than two hundred police assigned to the demonstration. Some members of the crowd wore t-shirts supporting the far-right Proud Boys. There were also protests in the Los Angeles area, including at the Los Angeles Police Department headquarters downtown; as well as in Beverly Hills and in Newport Beach. An incident was reported of a protester spraying a counter-protester with a chemical irritant. During the Los Angeles protests, a mob of thirty to forty Trump supporters physically assaulted a black woman who was walking down the street, shouting racial slurs and chanting "All Lives Matter" while shoving, striking, spraying with pepper spray, and ripping off her hair extensions.
- In Georgia, about sixty pro-Trump activists gathered outside the state capitol in Atlanta, including armed militia movement members. A courthouse complex and two other government buildings were closed as a precaution. Chester Doles, a former Ku Klux Klan member who leads the far-right group American Patriots USA, attempted to enter the state capitol to deliver a "redress of grievances" about the election to Georgia Secretary of State Brad Raffensperger; however, Raffensperger and his staff evacuated early as a precaution.
- In Kansas, at the state capitol in Topeka, thousands of pro-Trump protesters held a rally on the Capitol lawn. The protesters erected a gallows with a noose in front of the state capitol, with the words "death to tyrants" etched into the wood of the gallows. Nearly one hundred of the protesters made their way into the state capitol and chanted "Trump 2020" and "USA" before being asked to leave by state police. No reported arrests were made.
- In Oklahoma, at the state capitol in Oklahoma City, one arrest was made on charges of attempted arson as well as assault and battery for attempting to light other people's flags on fire. The protest numbered in the hundreds and was otherwise peaceful.
- In Oregon, arrests were made after hundreds gathered outside the Oregon State Capitol in Salem.
- In Washington, pro-Trump activists, some of whom were armed, broke through the gates at the Washington Governor's Mansion at the State Capitol Campus in Olympia, and occupied the front lawn, prompting a standoff with the State Patrol.

Pro-Trump events were held without incident in Indiana, Minnesota, Nevada, Nebraska, Ohio, Arizona, Colorado, Kansas, Michigan, Pennsylvania, Tennessee, Texas, Wisconsin, and Wyoming.

==== January 9 ====
- In Frankfort, about one hundred heavily armed protesters assembled for a "patriot rally" outside the Kentucky State Capitol while the General Assembly was in session. "Three days after domestic terrorists attacked our U.S. Capitol, there was a militia rally in Frankfort. They brought zip ties. We will not be intimidated," Governor Andy Beshear tweeted in response.

==== January 17 ====
The FBI reported that protests were being planned for all U.S. state capitols (and Washington) likely January 16–20, the 17th being symbolic to QAnon and the 20th Inauguration Day. Substantial security preparations were undertaken to protect the United States Capitol, state capitols, and other locations from potential threats, and the protests occurred only in about a dozen states, featuring a small number of participants.

- In Lansing, protests at the Michigan Capitol drew about 150 demonstrators and heavy Michigan National Guard presence. Some protesters with AR-15 rifles joined other demonstrators at the Capitol. Authorities said there had been no arrests or incidents of violence. In addition to National Guard, military vehicles were present near the Capitol building and a helicopter flew above the location for most of the day.
- In Austin, a crowd of about a hundred, many armed and focused on gun rights, gathered outside the Texas Capitol. The Texas Department of Public Safety closed the Capitol to the public on January 15 after obtaining information that "violent extremists" were seeking to arrive at further protests over the weekend.
- Smaller armed protests and demonstrations also took place at the state capitols of Kentucky, Maine, Ohio, South Carolina, South Dakota, Utah, Virginia.

=== February 2021 ===
- On February 15, a rally was held by Trump supporters in West Palm Beach, Florida for Presidents' Day.

=== March 2021 ===
- On March 5, in Lafayette, California, pro-Trump demonstrations continued on the El Curtola overpass, prompting the city to request additional support from California Highway Patrol and California Department of Transportation.
- On March 6, armed Trump supporters in New York City clashed with anti-Trump protesters near Trump Tower. During the event, a police officer was attacked with bleach. At least four people were arrested afterwards.
- On March 20, over 100 Trump supporters in Raleigh, North Carolina gathered to protest North Carolina's COVID-19 restrictions.

=== April 2021 ===
- On April 11, a White Lives Matter protest was held in Huntington Beach, California, with several Trump supporters turning violent when they clashed with counterprotesters.

== Anti-Trump protests ==
=== November 2020 ===
==== November 4 ====
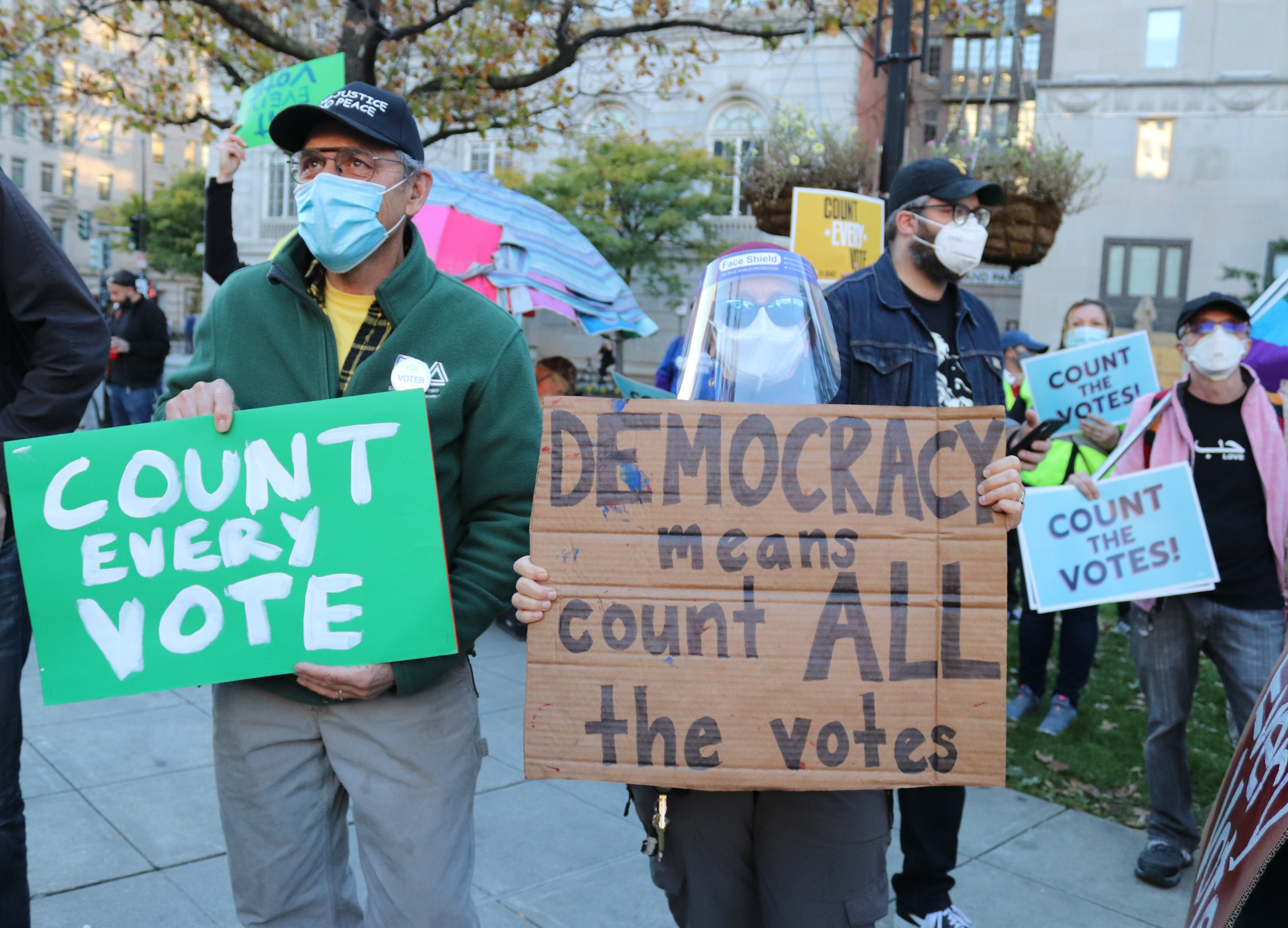
"Count Every Vote" rally in Washington, D.C., November 4, 2020

- Demonstrations were held in several cities, including Dallas, Kansas City, and Pittsburgh, to demand the counting of every vote.
- In Chicago, hundreds of anti-Trump protesters gathered to express their anger toward Trump's demand for vote counting to stop. City officials raised the Wabash Avenue Bridge in a preemptive move to ward off unrest near Trump Tower.
- In Houston, several different protests took place downtown. One group marched with anti-Trump posters from Houston City Hall to a federal building. Fox 26 news reported that "members of the group carried guns and used a baseball bat to hit a President Donald Trump piñata."
- In Minneapolis, two groups of protesters were expected to march two miles, one beginning on Cedar Avenue in Cedar-Riverside neighborhood, and another from Hennepin County Government Center downtown. Hundreds of protesters began to walk out onto eastbound Interstate 94, leading to traffic being backed up for miles. Police arrested and then released 646 protesters who were blocking Interstate 94.
- In Manhattan, protesters and police clashed near Union Square, resulting in 25 arrests and more than 30 summonses. Police reported finding weapons on some people at the march including knives, a Taser and M-80 explosives.
- In Portland, Oregon, anti-Trump protesters demanded that every vote in the election be counted. This led to the declaration of a riot after police saw people smashing business windows. Oregon Governor Kate Brown activated the state's National Guard to help police manage the unrest.
- In Seattle, hundreds took to the streets to demand a full count of all votes and a halt to Trump's challenges to stop counts in some key battleground states. Seven people were arrested on Capitol Hill on suspicions of obstruction, pedestrian interference, property damage, resisting arrest, and assaulting officers.

==== November 5 ====
- In Philadelphia, groups of both anti-Trump and pro-Trump protesters gathered and then clashed outside Philadelphia Convention Center.

==== November 8 ====
- In St. Louis, demonstrators from liberal groups gathered downtown to celebrate Trump's defeat and promote progressive policy reforms.

== Anti-Trump and anti-Biden protests ==
=== November 2020 ===
- In Portland, hundreds of anarchists and anti-fascists protested against both presidential candidates. Protesters carried signs stating "strong communities make politicians obsolete" and "we don't want Biden we want revenge"; they also chanted "fuck Biden". A small section of protesters began rioting near an U.S. Immigration and Customs Enforcement detention facility, and the Oregon Army National Guard was sent into Portland. 17 protesters were arrested. Anarchists generally embrace the notion of the "ungovernable generation", the idea that the political system is inherently broken; they reject party politics as well as the electoral system, arguing instead that change should be done through grassroots organizing, solidarity, and mutual aid.

=== January 2021 ===
==== January 20 ====
- In downtown Seattle, riots broke out following the inauguration of Joe Biden. During the unrest, vehicles and buildings were damaged, including the William Kenzo Nakamura Courthouse. Two people were arrested, one for assault, and the other for property damage.
- In Portland, similar demonstrations, nicknamed "J20", broke out between anti-fascist protesters and local authorities. According to the Portland Police Bureau, up to 150 demonstrators gathered at Revolution Hall and marched to the headquarters of the Democratic Party of Oregon, and clashes with police followed. Rioters publicly denounced Biden while advocating for a variety of social justice causes. Eight adults were arrested. A second peaceful protest was held at Irving Park in northeast Portland, where about 150 people gathered in protest of Biden's presidency and policies.

== See also ==
- American decline
- Big lie
- COVID-19 anti-lockdown protests in the United States
- Democratic backsliding
- Demonstrations in support of Donald Trump
- List of incidents of political violence in Washington, D.C.
- List of post–2016 election Donald Trump rallies
- Protests against Donald Trump
- Republican efforts to restrict voting following the 2020 presidential election
- Second impeachment of Donald Trump (trial)
- Stop the steal
