= Judith Browne Dianis =

American activist

Judith Browne-Dianis
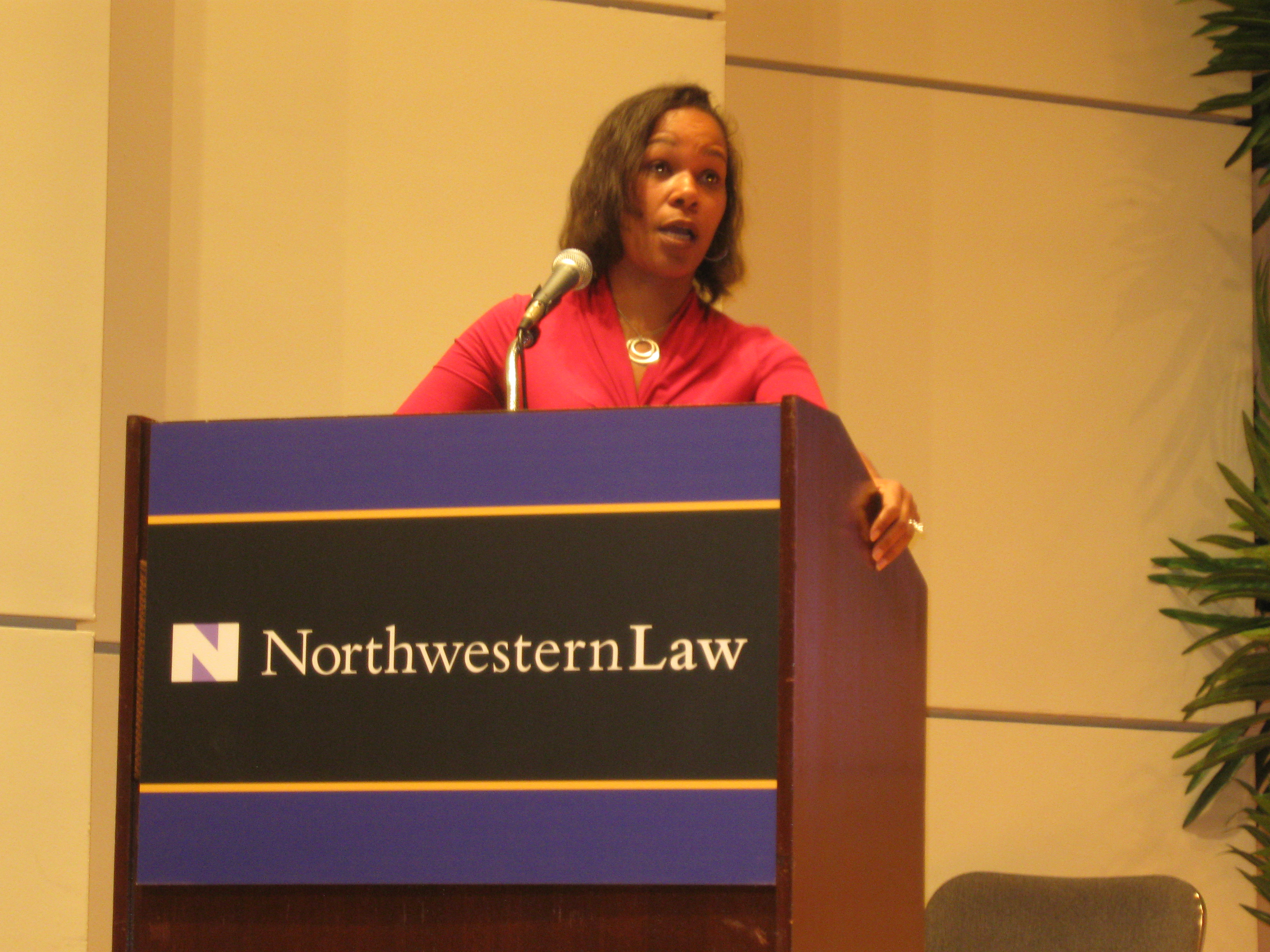
- Education: University of Pennsylvania; Columbia University

Judith A. Browne Dianis is an American civil rights attorney. She is the executive director of the Advancement Project, a liberal nonprofit organization based in Washington, D.C.

== Background ==
Dianis graduated from the Wharton School of Business and Columbia University School of Law. She was awarded a Skadden Fellowship. She has served as an adjunct professor of law at Georgetown University Law Center, and as a Tobias Simon Eminent Scholar at Florida State University Law School.

Prior to Advancement Project, she was the Managing Attorney in the Washington, D.C., office of the NAACP Legal Defense and Educational Fund, Inc.

In 2000, Essence Magazine named Dianis one of "Thirty Women to Watch". She regularly comments on education, voting rights and race on networks including MSNBC, CNN, and BET.

== History with Advancement Project ==
Attorney Dianis was a part of Advancement Project's inception in 1999, when it was co-founded by former Advancement Project co-director Penda Hair and several of their peers from the NAACP Legal Defense and Educational Fund, Inc.

With Advancement Project, she litigated against the disenfranchisement of African-American voters during the 2000 presidential election in Florida. Later she filed one of the first-ever lawsuits to enforce the National Voter Registration Act, also known as the "Motor Voter" law, litigating on behalf of African-American Floridians after the election.

In 2004, Dianis sued to stop the Republican National Committee from engaging in potential voter suppression tactics in Ohio. These tactics included the RNC's mass mailings to registered voters, designed so that unreturned or undeliverable mail could be used to challenge those voters' names remaining on the registration rolls.

In 2005, with Loyola Law Clinic, Dianis and Advancement Project sued for "right to return" for displaced Katrina victims who were unable to return to New Orleans after the public housing they once lived in was labeled as condemned.

In 2008, she sued to ensure equitable allocation of voting machines in Virginia.

Dianis was awarded a Prime Movers Fellowship in 2013.

She has advocated against the school-to-prison pipeline, authoring several reports on the issue including: "Suspended: The Devastating Consequences of Zero Tolerance and School Discipline" and "Derailed: The Schoolhouse to Jailhouse Track". In 2014, Dianis was named a Black Male Achievement Social Innovator by the Leadership & Sustainability Institute.

In 2012, Dianis addressed Congress about the school-to-prison pipeline.

== Other affiliations ==
In 2014, as part of Advancement Project, she joined My Brother's Keeper National Convening Council, a private sector initiative that acts as a support system for President Barack Obama's My Brother's Keeper. Formerly served on the board of FairTest, a non-profit devoted to eliminating the misuse of standardized testing. She currently serves on the Board of Directors of the Hill Snowdon Foundation, the Skadden Fellowship Foundation, and serves as the Vice Chair of Friends of the Earth.
