= 2021 United States inauguration week protests =

Protests against the presidency of Joe Biden

- Part of the 2020–21 United States election protests and attempts to overturn the 2020 United States presidential election
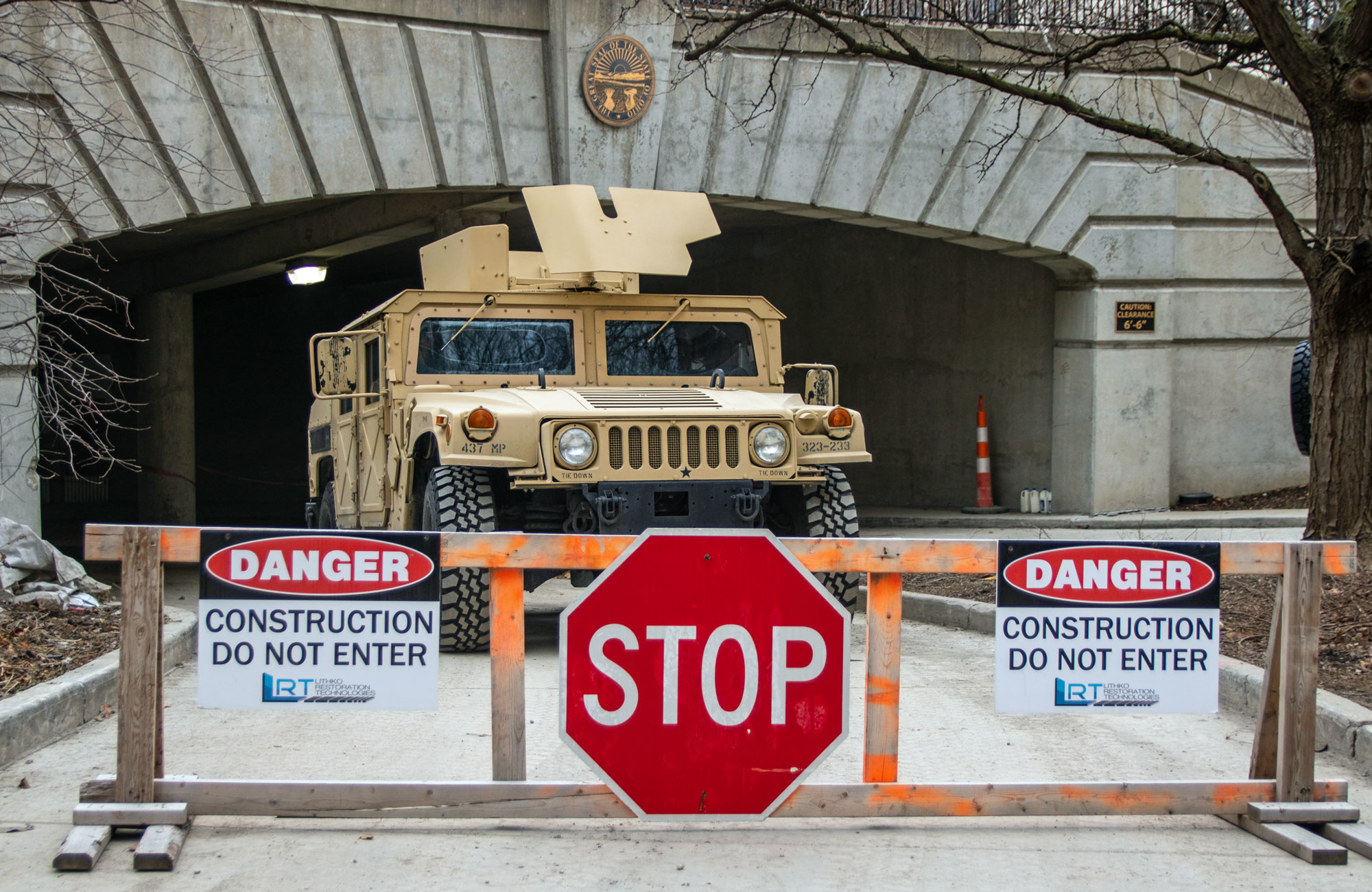
- An armored vehicle at the Ohio Statehouse prior to a planned pro-Trump armed march
- Date: January 16–20, 2021 (5 days)
- Location: United States Capitol (Washington, D.C.); United States state capitol buildings (various)
- Caused by: Continued opposition to the results of the 2020 United States presidential election after the failure of the 2021 storming of the United States Capitol and the resumption of the presidential transition; Donald Trump's and his allies' false claims of 2020 presidential election fraud; Suspensions of Trump's social media accounts and subsequent impeachment of Trump; Second Amendment concerns; Right-wing extremism in the United States
- Goals: Interfere with the transition of the presidency to Joe Biden
- Methods: Armed protests, demonstrations, civil disobedience, civil resistance, police impersonation, threats of violence, bomb threats
- Result: Inauguration of Joe Biden; Failure of Trump supporters to stage organized dissent or affect the transition of power; Heightened security at the United States Capitol building and various state capitol buildings; Several arrests of protestors

Supporters of Donald Trump, the 45th president of the United States, held small-scale armed protests and demonstrations at U.S. state capitols in the five days leading up to the inauguration of Joe Biden on January 20, 2021, in opposition to the results of the 2020 United States presidential election, which continued after the failure of the violent January 6 attempt to overturn the election in Trump's favor. Pro-Trump groups failed to stage organized dissent or affect the transition of power in an environment of deterrence and heightened security.

Fears of violent protests after a January 11 FBI warning led to a drastic increase in security at state capitols and the United States Capitol, which served as the site of the presidential swearing-in ceremony. Increased monitoring and police presence, closures of public buildings, curfews, temporary fencing, and other security measures were employed in response to the security threat. The United States Capitol was put under the protection of members of the National Guard, which was additionally activated in at least 19 states, to protect state capitols.

The protests featured the participation of far-right militia groups that follow right-libertarianism, neo-fascism, neo-Nazism, white supremacism, and other ultranationalist or right-wing ideologies, as well as members of the New Black Panther Party, and the QAnon and boogaloo movements. On January 31, 2021, detailed overviews of attempts to subvert the 2020 U.S. presidential election and Biden's inauguration were published by The New York Times.

== Background ==
Following the 2020 United States presidential election between incumbent President Donald Trump and Democratic challenger Joe Biden, Biden's victory became clear, and on December 14 the electoral college voted formalizing Biden's victory. Before and after the election, Trump, his presidential campaign, and his allies challenged the legitimacy of the election and baselessly claimed widespread electoral fraud. Trump and his allies filed dozens of legal challenges to the results, but the courts found that his claims had no factual or legal basis. His unsubstantiated allegations of widespread voting fraud were also refuted by state election officials. Trump nonetheless conspired with his campaign team to submit documents in several states (all of which had been won by Biden) which falsely claimed to be legitimate electoral certificates for President Trump and Vice President Mike Pence. After the submission of these documents, the Trump campaign intended that the presiding officer of the United States Senate, either President of the Senate Pence or President pro tempore Chuck Grassley, would claim to have the unilateral power to reject electors during the January 6, 2021 vote counting session; the presiding officer would reject all electors from the several states in which the Trump campaign had submitted false documents, leaving 232 votes for Trump and 222 votes for Biden, thereby overturning the election results in favor of Trump. The plans for January 6 failed to come to fruition after Pence refused to follow the campaign's proposals.

Pro-Trump protesters engaged in multiple demonstrations in Washington, D.C., state capitals, and other locations nationwide decrying the election results and echoing Trump's false claims of election fraud. In November and December 2020, there were nighttime clashes and street scuffles in Washington, D.C., between Trump supporters who refused to accept the president's defeat, including the Proud Boys, and counterprotesters.

On January 6, 2021, when the United States Congress convened to certify the electoral votes of the presidential election, supporters of Trump stormed the United States Capitol in an attempt to prevent the tabulation of votes and protest Biden's win, which was preceded by an earlier speech from Trump that called on them to protest the results and support those opposing Biden's win. Demonstrators unlawfully entered the U.S. Capitol Building and gathered on both its eastern and western fronts, including on the inaugural platform constructed for the upcoming January 20 inauguration of Joe Biden.

A rioter was shot and killed. A Capitol police officer and three rioters died of non-violent causes. Two pipe bombs were found at nearby buildings. Another Capitol police officer who was on duty during the riots died by suicide days later. In the early morning hours of January 7, the electoral votes were certified, and Trump released a statement stating that there will be an "orderly transition" of power on Inauguration Day. Trump was impeached for "incitement of insurrection".

Word of a "Million Militia March" and "Million Martyr March" in honor of Ashli Babbitt, a Trump supporter who was fatally shot during the storming of the Capitol, spread in online chats between people associated with the protests.

=== Kentucky State Capitol armed protest ===
One of the most militant demonstrations of Trump supporters that would take place in the subsequent weeks, and leading up to Biden's inauguration, had already occurred – prior to the January 11 FBI warning. In Frankfort, on January 9, approximately 100 heavily armed protesters assembled for a "patriot rally" outside the Kentucky State Capitol while both chambers of the General Assembly were in session. One of the armed protesters was wearing camouflage from head to toe and carrying several zip ties, explaining that he brought them "just in case." Some of the protesters carried militia flags, pro-Trump insignia, and Three Percenters symbols. "Three days after domestic terrorists attacked our U.S. Capitol, there was a militia rally in Frankfort. They brought zip ties. We will not be intimidated", Governor Andy Beshear tweeted in response.

=== FBI warning ===
In response to calls for further protests and violence in Washington, D.C., and states across the U.S., the FBI, Secret Service, and state law enforcement agencies began conducting threat assessments and tracking extremist rhetoric online. CNN reported on January 11 that an internal FBI bulletin warned that "Armed protests are being planned at all 50 state capitols from 16 January through at least 20 January, and at the US Capitol from 17 January through 20 January," continuing, "an identified group calling for others to join them in 'storming' state, local and federal government courthouses and administrative buildings in the event POTUS is removed as President prior to Inauguration Day. This identified group is also planning to 'storm' government offices including in the District of Columbia and in every state, regardless of whether the states certified electoral votes for Biden or Trump, on 20 January." It was reported that members of far-right online forums planned to attend. Some groups also organized on social media platforms such as Facebook and Twitter, and on alt-tech communication apps like Telegram, Gab, and Parler. Chatter obtained by law enforcement agencies found that participants planned to "storm" government offices, such as state and federal administrative buildings, in response to the 117th United States Congress' certification of presidential electoral votes on January 6, 2021. Protests were set for the days leading up to Biden's inauguration, with a "Million Militia March" planned for January 20. The FBI reported that protests were likely to take place at the national capitol from January 17 to 20, and at state capitols from January 16 to 20. The 20th was the day of the inauguration, while the 17th was a symbolic date for followers of the conspiracy QAnon, as "Q" is the seventeenth letter of the alphabet.

In a January 11 briefing, Capitol Police informed House Democrats they were prepared for "tens of thousands of armed protesters" in the coming days, and that they were aware of and monitoring three separate plots: one in honor of killed rioter Ashli Babbitt, another promoted as the United States' "largest armed protest ever", and a third "would involve insurrectionists forming a perimeter around the Capitol, the White House[,] and the Supreme Court" before "blocking Democrats from entering the Capitol — perhaps even killing them ― so that Republicans could take control of the government". On January 11, a House lawmaker told HuffPost that insurrectionist groups, now left without sites like Parler to use as recruitment platforms, sought media attention for their planned demonstrations or attacks "as a way to further disseminate information and to attract additional support for their attacks."

== Washington, D.C. ==
Significant efforts were made to deter people from visiting Washington, D.C., during the week of the inauguration out of the concern that assemblies may become violent. This prompted a strengthening of security in the city, and an introduction of many restrictions on travel, both by state and private entities. The Biden Inaugural Committee and Joint Congressional Committee on Inaugural Ceremonies urged people not to gather in the city for the ceremony. City Mayor Muriel Bowser urged tourists not to visit the city during the week of the event and requested all demonstration permits processed by the Department of the Interior be rejected. Initially planning for 10,000 National Guard troops in D.C. for the protests, the Pentagon upped the number to over 20,000, and authorized the use of lethal force, around January 14. Troops came from 46 U.S. states and three territories. The incidents that occurred in Washington, D.C., in this period included an instance of police impersonation and a bomb threat. The inauguration itself proceeded without incident.

== U.S. state capitols ==
California officials increased security in Sacramento ahead of planned protests. The California State Capitol had additional security, including dozens of California Highway Patrol officers, mounted police, and uniformed and plainclothes officers. The California Assembly and State Senate monitored potential threats and put in place additional security. The California National Guard did not expect large crowds in the city, though troops were ready for deployment in case it becomes necessary. About 1,000 members of the California National Guard were activated on January 14 and deployed throughout downtown Sacramento on January 16, concentrated around state and federal buildings. In Los Angeles, Trump supporters protested outside of City Hall, and fought with counter-protesters, leading to several arrests. The city planned for further protests, and regional lawmakers called on the state to establish units specific to domestic terrorism.

The Georgia State Capitol in Atlanta had a heavy law enforcement presence, including military vehicles and barriers. Two armed protesters confronted Georgia State troopers and Georgia National Guard members on the steps of the Capitol, but remained peaceful.

About 270 Kentucky National Guard members were sent to the Washington, D.C., in the week, to assist security operations. Dozens of state police and National Guard members were stationed in Frankfort on January 17, when only 2 armed members of the boogaloo movement and 15 armed pro-BLM counter-protesters appeared in the proximity of the state capitol building. Police vehicles surrounded the building, limiting access to it.

In Maine, a "handful" of Trump supporters gathered at the state house.

Michigan State Capitol was an indicated site of an armed protest of the Southeast Michigan Militia, planned for January 17, 2021. The group's coordinator stated that the militia has "no plans of storming the [state's] Capitol" nor causing unrest unless provoked. The protest drew about 75 protesters, some of whom were armed, and about 40 counter-protesters, and a heavy Michigan National Guard presence. In addition, military vehicles were present near the Capitol building and a helicopter flew above the location for most of the day. There were no arrests or incidents of violence.

Governor of Minnesota Tim Walz activated the Minnesota National Guard on January 13 to assist state and local law enforcement in St. Paul. A fence had been in place around the Minnesota State Capitol since the previous summer, and state patrol had increased its presence. On January 17, about a dozen people, including counter-protesters, demonstrated outside the state capitol building.

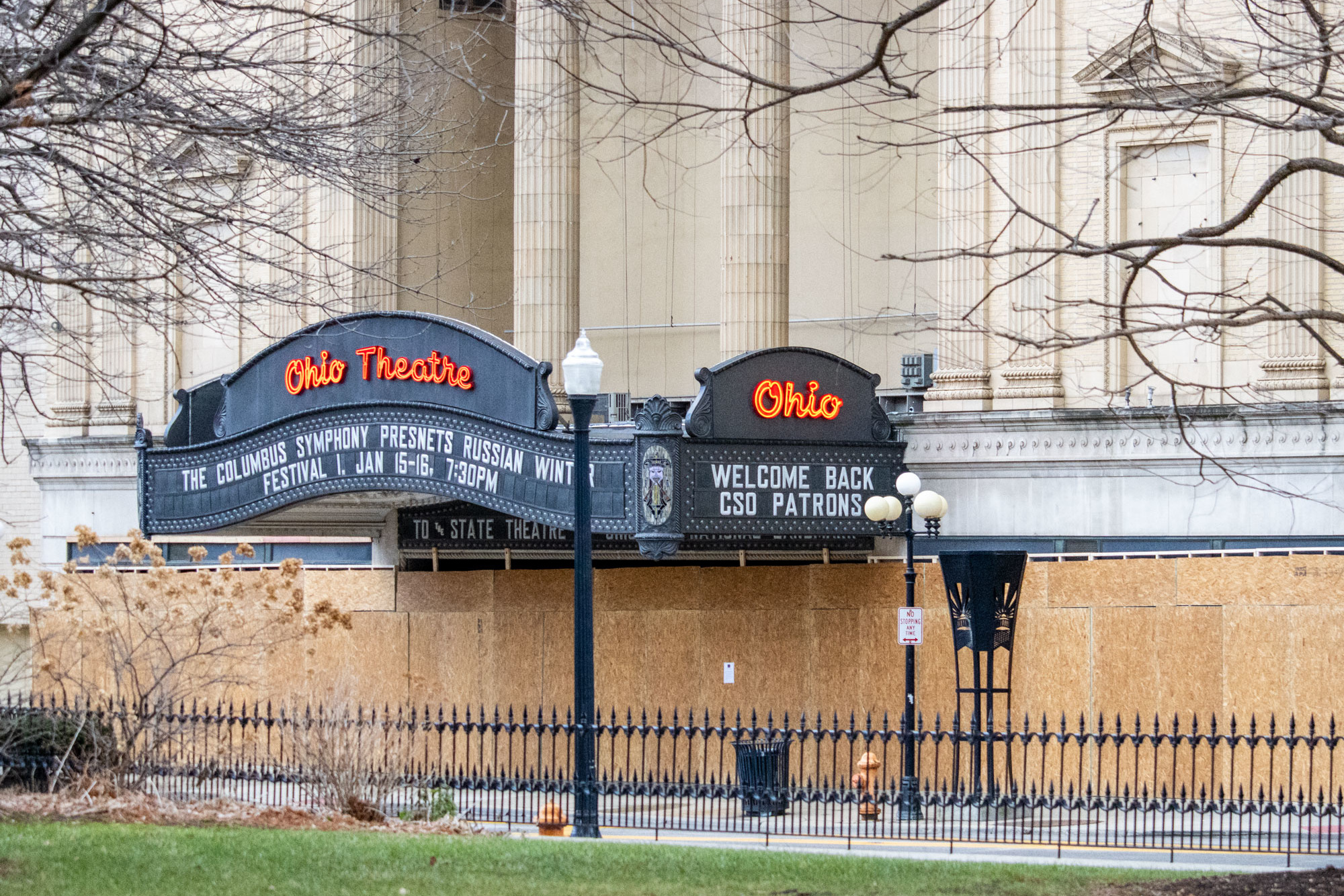
Boarded-up Ohio Theatre in preparation for protests

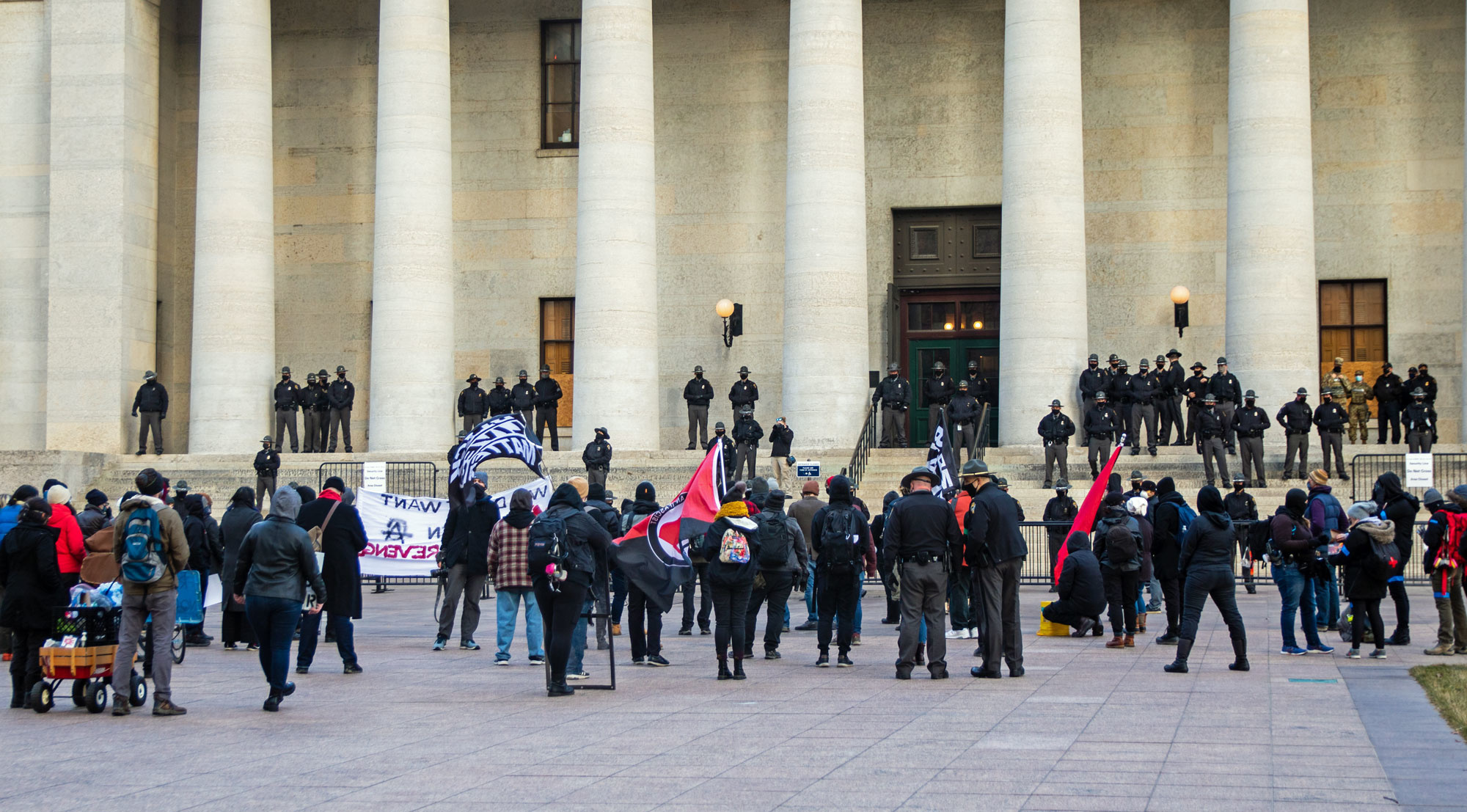
Counter-protesters and Ohio State Highway Patrol troopers gather at the Ohio Statehouse on January 20.

Governor of Ohio Mike DeWine expected a planned "armed march" to take place at the state capitol, the Ohio Statehouse. In response, he announced a closure of the building, as well as all other state facilities in the city's downtown, to last from January 17 to 20. Columbus City Hall and three other municipal buildings were closed on January 19–20, and some Franklin County offices were closed on January 20. City, county, and community leaders urged residents to avoid Downtown Columbus from January 17 to 20. The Statehouse's ground floor windows were boarded up, and mobile lights were installed in advance of the protests. The metropolitan area bus service announced it would reroute buses around the Capitol Square area downtown. Businesses downtown were preparing for violent protests, especially around Capitol Square. About 115 were damaged while unprepared during George Floyd protests in May; some were boarding up while others were removing plywood boards installed that May. Ohio spokespeople promised a "significant presence" of security to stop any violence. Up to 580 Ohio National Guardsmen supported large numbers of Ohio State Highway Patrol troopers and Columbus police. While some state capitols banned guns within their grounds during the anticipated protests, Ohio's Republican-led Capitol Square Review and Advisory Board did not issue a temporary gun ban for the Statehouse grounds. Hidden and open-carry weapons were banned from the grounds until April 2019, in a rarely-enforced law; guns remained banned from being carried within the building. Authorities in Cleveland announced that the city would close all nonemergency municipal buildings downtown, including its city hall, ahead of the protests. On January 17, members of the Boogaloo movement turned out at the Ohio Statehouse with firearms and flags, including one that said "Liberty or Death." Two protesters with bullhorns dominated the event, one of whom ranted about vaccines, voting machines, fluoride in drinking water, and LGBTQ rights. Military personnel far outnumbered armed protesters and counter protesters.

In South Carolina, about 40 protesters gathered in front of the State House, for a rally of free speech in response to the social media companies banning of Trump.

In South Dakota, prayer groups affiliated to the Jericho March held marches in and around the South Dakota State Capitol since the start of December 2020 and in the weeks leading up to Biden's inauguration.

In Texas, the state department of public safety increased patrols of the Texas State Capitol, and continuously monitored protest events. The Austin Police Department worked with the state department to ensure protests remain peaceful. Armed protesters showed up on January 12, prompting the Texas Department of Public Safety to close the Capitol to the public from January 15 to 20, after obtaining information that "violent extremists" might seek to exploit the armed protests during the weekend. On January 16, a small group of protesters demonstrated at the capitol building without incident. On January 17, a crowd of about 100 protesters, many armed and focused on gun rights, gathered outside the Texas State Capitol and peacefully demonstrated.

Governor of Utah Spencer Cox declared a state of emergency and asked the Utah National Guard, highway patrol, and local police departments to "stand ready to ensure the safety of lives and property at Utah's Capitol". A demonstration was planned for January 17 by the boogaloo bois, with only about 15 protesters seen at the Utah State Capitol for the event.

In Virginia, on January 15, 2021, a bomb threat was received at the Virginia Supreme Court building. Dozens of armed demonstrators were seen in Richmond on January 18, and identified themselves as members of the Proud Boys, boogaloo groups, and Black Panthers taking part in the state's annual event to support Second Amendment rights. A car caravan, a part of the Citizens Defense League also gathered in the area.

=== Additional security preparations ===
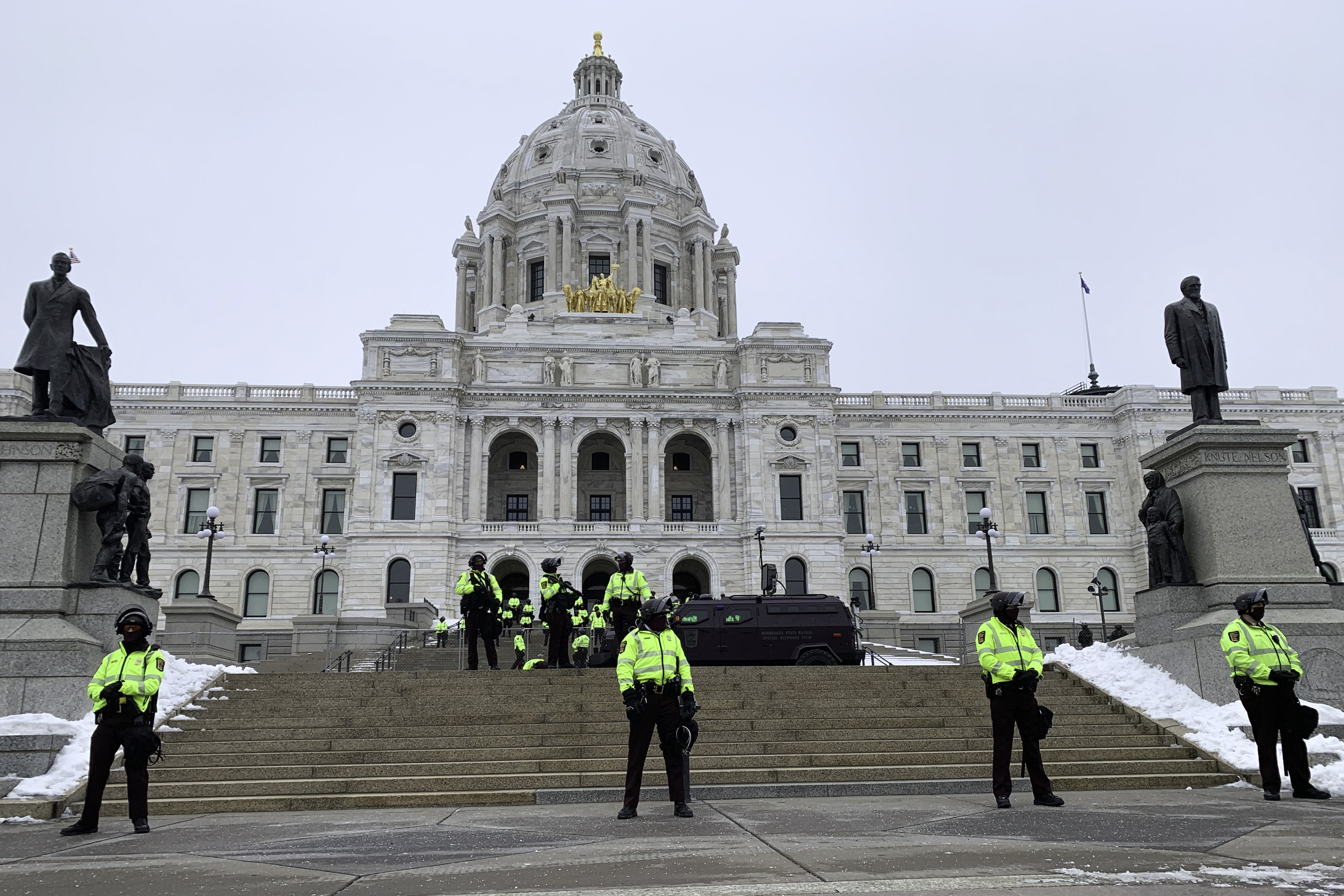
Minnesota State Patrol troopers at the state capitol, January 17

- The Delaware National Guard were activated to protect the state capitol building among other areas. A six-foot fence was put up around the building, and law enforcement patrolled on high-alert.
- In Tallahassee, Florida, law enforcement officials anticipated armed protests. Legislative staff worked remotely, and lawmakers did not return to the capitol until several days after the planned protests. The county sheriff's office increased security on the capitol grounds and were coordinated for additional security with state and city agencies. The Florida National Guard was activated on January 15. No specific threats were identified. On January 17, the Florida State Capitol locked down after threats of violence.
- The Illinois National Guard was stationed around the State Capitol.
- Authorities in Nevada began receiving threats against the Nevada State Capitol following the storming of the U.S. Capitol; Nevada National Guard assembled units to support security forces at the Capitol building in response.
- Oklahoma lawmakers ordered increased security measures and police presence at the Oklahoma State Capitol building in Oklahoma City after reports of planned armed protests. Governor Kevin Stitt later announced that members of the Oklahoma National Guard would be activated at the Oklahoma State Capitol from January 16 to January 17 to prevent potential violence.
- Governor of Oregon Kate Brown activated the National Guard. About five individuals were seen protesting outside the Oregon State Capitol in Salem, identifying themselves as anti-government libertarians that rejected both parties.
- On January 14, Pennsylvania law enforcement announced that they had found no specific threat against the Pennsylvania State Capitol in Harrisburg but were taking extra safety precautions such as increased crisis response teams patrolling the area. However, it was later reported by York Daily Record that pro-Trump protesters were planning to gather at the Pennsylvania State Capitol during inauguration week; in response Governor Tom Wolf announced the activation of 450 National Guard members to assist law enforcement and ordered the Capitol complex to be closed for two days during the week.

== See also ==
- 2020 United States presidential election
- 2020–21 United States election protests
- January 6 United States Capitol attack
- Inauguration of Joe Biden
- Presidential transition of Joe Biden
