= Marshall Park (Charlotte, North Carolina) =

Urban park in Charlotte, North Carolina

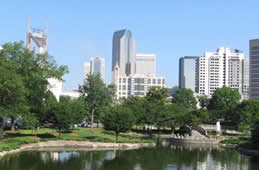
- Charlotte skyline seen from Marshall Park
- Interactive map of Marshall Park
- Type: Public park
- Location: Charlotte, North Carolina
- Coordinates: 35.2192°N 80.8386°W
- Area: 5.5 acres (2.2 ha)
- Created: 1973
- Operator: Mecklenburg County Parks and Recreation
- Website: Marshall Park

Marshall Park is a 5.5-acre (2.2 ha) urban park at 800 East Third Street in the Second Ward of Charlotte, North Carolina. It features a large fountain and a lake, an amphitheater, a statue of Martin Luther King Jr., and a Holocaust memorial monument. The park contains large open grassy areas with an unobstructed view of the Charlotte skyline. The Park is named for James B. Marshall, Sr., a former Charlotte city manager. Now owned by Mecklenburg County, the park is part of 17 acres (6.9 ha) of land the county is looking to sell to a developer. Under a 2018 agreement, Marshall Park would be replaced with a smaller 1.6-acre (0.65 ha) park.

== Protest site ==
Because of its proximity to center city, Marshall Park is occasionally the site of protester camps and demonstrations, sometimes with the implied consent of local officials, such as during the 2012 Democratic National Convention. On August 19, 2013, more than 2,000 people gathered in Marshall Park for a Moral Monday protest against actions by the recently elected Republican government of North Carolina.
