= Advancement Project =

Civil rights advocacy organization

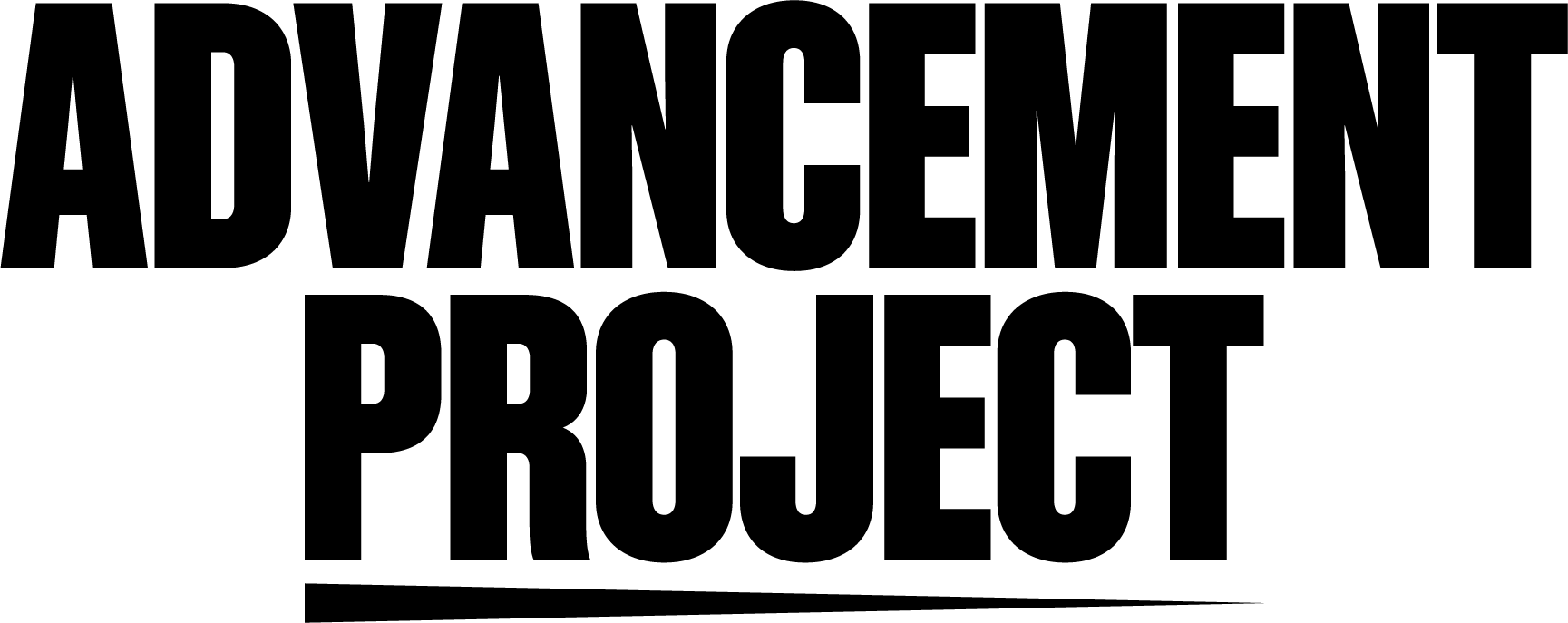
- Formation: 1999
- Founder: Penda Hair and Constance L. Rice
- Type: Non-profit corporation
- Purpose: Political advocacy
- Headquarters: Washington, D.C.
- Region served: United States
- Website: advancementproject.org

Advancement Project Co-Director Judith Browne Dianis

The Advancement Project is a politically liberal American nonprofit organization that focuses on racial justice issues. The organization has a national office in Washington, D.C., as well as a California-specific office based in Los Angeles.

== Overview ==
The Advancement Project was founded in 1999 by civil rights lawyers in Los Angeles and Washington D.C.

The organization is made up of two offices: Advancement Project National Office (based in Washington, D.C.) and Advancement Project California.

The executive director of the Advancement Project's national office is Judith Browne Dianis. The executive director of the California-based office is John Kim. The founding co-directors include Advancement Project co-founders Constance L. Rice, Stephen R. English, and Molly Munger.

== Activities ==
=== Advancement Project National Office ===
The Advancement Project National Office is known for its opposition to voter ID laws and advocates for automatic voting rights restoration for all felons. This includes working with Voice of the Experienced (VOTE), a Louisiana non-profit organization in 2017. In 2018, the organization was also actively involved in the passage of Amendment 4 in Florida, which restores voting rights to most ex-felons. The Advancement Project also works with the non-partisan VoteRiders organization to spread state-specific information on voter ID requirements.

The Advancement Project National Office also advocates for an end to school disciplinary measures which it believes disproportionately put minority children into a school-to-prison pipeline. In 2018, the organization's national office partnered with the Alliance for Educational Justice and released a national report on the state and impact of police presence in schools.

The organization has taken part in Moral Mondays protests, which are liberal demonstrations against Republican public policies.

In 2019, Ben & Jerry's partnered with the Advancement Project on a campaign focused on criminal justice reform. The campaign included efforts to shut down a St. Louis jail, Workhouse, and other similar jails.

=== Advancement Project California ===
In 2017, Advancement Project California launched RACE COUNTS which surveyed California's counties to rank them according to racial disparity. The disparities were measured based on economic opportunity, healthcare access, education, housing, democracy, crime and justice, and environment. Marin and Imperial County were ranked highest for racial disparity.

In 2019, the organization reported on the lack of child care facilities in the state. In April 2020, the organization advocated for a pause on permanent California school closings during the COVID-19 pandemic. The organization identified the schools at risk of permanent closure within the most densely populated counties in California. The organization also asked the state to invest in communities impacted by COVID-19 shelter-in-place orders based on children who do not have access to early education or child care.

In May 2020, the organization released a policy brief showing the disproportionate number of COVID-19 cases between Black or Latino residents and white residents in Los Angeles County. The policy brief also showed that communities with higher poverty rates had more COVID-19 cases than wealthier communities.

== Board of directors ==
Both Advancement Project's National Office in Washington, D.C. and Advancement Project California are governed by a 16-member board of directors. As of 2019, the board included Bill Lann Lee, Joe Alvarez, Arlene Holt Baker, Harry Belafonte, Stephen R. English, Rinku Sen, Helen Kim, Daniel Leon-Davis, Ash-Lee Henderson, Alberto Retana, Barrett S. Litt, Molly Munger, Katherine Peck, Constance L. Rice, Tom Unterman, and Jesse Williams. In 2023, the board was composed of Arlene Holt Baker, Ash-Lee Woodard Henderson, Bill Lann Lee, Daniel Alejandro Leon-Davis, Jesse Williams, Joe Alvarez, Monica Clark, Nat Chioke Williams, Franita Tolson, Stephen R. English, Thomasina Williams, and Uzoma Nkwonta.
