= Brnovich v. Democratic National Committee =

Brnovich v. Democratic National Committee Arizona Republican Party v. Democratic National Committee
- Supreme Court of the United States

Argued March 2, 2021 Decided July 1, 2021
- Full case name: Mark Brnovich, Attorney General of Arizona, et al. v. Democratic National Committee, et al. Arizona Republican Party, et al. v. Democratic National Committee, et al.
- Docket nos.: 19-1257; 19-1258
- Citations: 594 U.S. 647 (more) 141 S.Ct. 2321

Case history
- Prior: No. 2:16-cv-01065-DLR, motion denied (208 F. Supp. 3d 1074, D. Ariz., 2016); No. 16-16698, motion denied, (840 F.3d 1057, 9th Cir., 2016); No. 16-16698, motion granted (843 F.3d 366, 9th Cir. en banc, 2016); No. 16A460, motion stayed (137 S. Ct. 446, 2016); No. CV-16-01065-PHX-DLR, judgement granted (329 F.Supp. 3d 824, D. Ariz, 2018); No. 18-15845, affirmed (904 F.3d 686, 9th Cir., 2018); No. 18-15845, vacated and reversed (948 F.3d 989, 9th Cir. en banc, 2020)

Holding
- Neither Arizona's out-of-precinct policy nor HB 2023 violate Section 2 of the Voting Rights Act of 1965 and HB 2023 was not enacted with a racially discriminatory purpose in mind.

Court membership
- Chief Justice John Roberts Associate Justices Clarence Thomas · Stephen Breyer; Samuel Alito · Sonia Sotomayor; Elena Kagan · Neil Gorsuch; Brett Kavanaugh · Amy Coney Barrett

Case opinions
- Majority: Alito, joined by Roberts, Thomas, Gorsuch, Kavanaugh, Barrett
- Concurrence: Gorsuch, joined by Thomas
- Dissent: Kagan, joined by Breyer, Sotomayor

Laws applied
- U.S. Const. amend. XV; Voting Rights Act of 1965

Brnovich v. Democratic National Committee, 594 U.S. 647 (2021), was a United States Supreme Court case related to voting rights established by the Voting Rights Act of 1965 (VRA), and specifically the applicability of Section 2's general provision barring discrimination against minorities in state and local election laws in the wake of the 2013 Supreme Court decision Shelby County v. Holder, which effectively removed the requirement that jurisdictions covered under Section 4(b) get preclearance to change their election procedures. Brnovich v. Democratic National Committee involved two of Arizona's election policies: one outlawing ballot collection and another banning out-of-precinct voting. The Supreme Court ruled in a 6–3 decision in July 2021 that neither of Arizona's election policies violated the VRA or had a racially discriminatory purpose.

== Background ==
The Voting Rights Act of 1965 (VRA) was one of the most significant pieces of legislation to protect voter rights for minorities by prohibiting discriminatory voting practices and providing federal oversight of jurisdictions with histories of racial discrimination in voting. Passed during the civil rights movement, the VRA has been amended several times since passage and has seen a body of case law develop at Supreme Court related to its various provisions and amendments. Generally, the VRA has been upheld five times as constitutional.

However, in a 5–4 decision in Shelby County v. Holder (2013), the Supreme Court effectively eliminated VRA's Section 5 "preclearance" requirement, which had mandated state and local governments in 15 states (those with a past history of voting rights violations) to seek permission from a federal court or the US Justice Department before making significant changes to voting laws. (Note: Of the current justices, Chief Justice John Roberts wrote the majority opinion in Shelby County with Justices Clarence Thomas and Samuel Alito joining, and Justices Stephen Breyer, Sonia Sotomayor, and Elena Kagan dissented.) The majority in Shelby County held that Section 4(b)'s coverage formula, which had been last amended by Congress in 1975, was "unconstitutional in light of current conditions" and "based on decades-old data and eradicated practices." The Supreme Court's decision left it to Congress to amend Section 4(b)'s coverage formula, but until Congress does so, Section 5's preclearance mandate is no longer valid law.

Shelby County, by eliminating the preclearance requirements, allowed certain state and local governments to freely pass voting laws without first seeking permission from the Federal courts or the U.S. Justice Department. A number of states passed new election laws ahead of the 2016 United States elections, which included the 2016 United States presidential election between the Republican candidate, Donald Trump, and the Democratic candidate, Hillary Clinton. While some laws were passed to support improved voting access recommendations from the Presidential Commission on Election Administration under Barack Obama, other laws were passed, particularly in states with conservative leadership, which required stricter identification checks for voting and shifted and reduced early voting periods, among other measures.

== Lower courts ==
The case primarily dealt with two election-related policies in Arizona challenged under the Fifteenth Amendment and Section 2 of the VRA, one being passed after Shelby County:

1. An existing out-of-precinct policy from 1970 requiring election officials to reject ballots placed by voters that vote in the wrong precinct
2. The new law, passed in 2016 as Arizona H.B. 2023 by the Republican-controlled Arizona State Legislature, making it a felony for anyone other than an election official or a family member or caregiver to handle or to collect a completed early voting or absentee ballot.

H.B. 2023 thus banned ballot collection, a practice critics call "ballot harvesting." Arizona governor Doug Ducey, a Republican, signed the bill into law and framed the legislation as similar to measures in 18 other states. Democratic lawmakers in Arizona questioned the lack of evidence related to voting fraud used to back the bill's passage.

Ahead of the election, the Democratic National Committee (DNC) sued and challenged both policies. The DNC claimed that Arizona's policy to reject ballots cast in the wrong precinct violated the First and Fourteenth Amendments related to voters' rights. The DNC further stated that H.B. 2023 violated the Fifteenth Amendment and Section 2 of the VRA, which states, "No voting qualification or prerequisite to voting, or standard, practice, or procedure shall be imposed or applied by any State or political subdivision to deny or abridge the right of any citizen of the United States to vote on account of race or color." The DNC argued that the legislation directly discriminated against the state's Hispanic, African American, and Native American population. The DNC contended that the state legislature had purposely created H.B. 2023 to discriminate against minority voters by making it "particularly burdensome" for voters in counties with larger minority populations to vote, such as in Maricopa County, as they generally had fewer or no in-person voting locations.

The DNC initially sought a preliminary injunction to prevent Arizona from enforcing these laws and policy ahead of the 2016 election. The U.S. District Court for the District of Arizona denied the injunction but was reversed on appeal to an en banc panel at the Ninth Circuit four days prior to the election that voted 6–5 to enforce the injunction. The state requested a stay of the Ninth Circuit's injunction from the Supreme Court, which it granted the next day and thus left both policies in place during the election while litigation continued.

In May 2018, after a ten-day trial, the District Court ruled against the DNC by upholding Arizona's election laws as neither unconstitutional nor violating the VRA. The initial appeal to a three-judge Ninth Circuit panel upheld the ruling, but a majority of judges of the Ninth Circuit voted for an en banc rehearing of the case and vacated the decision of the three-judge panel.

=== Ninth Circuit ===
In January 2020, the eleven-judge en banc Ninth Circuit panel reversed the judgment of the district court on a 7–4 vote and held that the ballot rejection policy and the absentee ballot collection law were unlawful by violating Section 2 of the VRA. The majority opinion was written by Judge William A. Fletcher, a concurring opinion was written by Judge Paul J. Watford, and separate dissents were written by Judges Diarmuid O'Scannlain and Jay Bybee. The en banc majority held that both the out-of-precinct policy and H.B. 2023 had a discriminatory impact on Native American, Hispanic, and African American voters. The court held that the policy violated the "results test" of Section 2 of the Voting Rights Act because they imposed a significant disparate burden on ethnic minority voters. The court found that in the 2016 election, minority groups were more than twice as likely to vote out-of-precinct than white voters, and that white voters were four times more likely to have home mail delivery and pickup compared to minority groups, which made both provisions discriminatory. Citing Thornburg v. Gingles, the court also held that the plaintiffs showed, under the "totality of circumstances," that the discriminatory burden created by the policies "was in part caused by or linked to 'social and historical conditions' that have or currently produce 'an inequality in the opportunities enjoyed by [minority] and white voters to elect their preferred representatives' and to participate in the political process."

The court also held that H.B. 2023 was enacted with discriminatory intent and therefore violated the "intent test" of Section 2 of the Voting Rights Act and of the Fifteenth Amendment. The court stated that H.B. 2023 was unnecessary, as Arizona had already made ballot tampering a felony via prior law. Instead, the court found that the intent of H.B. 2023 had been to fight the DNC's "get out the vote" campaign designed to increase voter turnout, which relied in part on the use of ballot collectors in minority-dense areas of the state. In concluding that the law was enacted with a discriminatory intent, the court cited "Arizona's long history of race-based voting discrimination; the Arizona legislature's unsuccessful efforts to enact less restrictive versions of the same law when preclearance was a threat; the false, race-based claims of ballot collection fraud used to convince Arizona legislators to pass H.B. 2023; the substantial increase in American Indian and Hispanic voting attributable to ballot collection that was targeted by H.B. 2023; and the degree of racially polarized voting in Arizona—cumulatively and unmistakably revealed that racial discrimination was a motivating factor in enacting H.B. 2023." Having decided the case on the VRA and Fifteenth Amendment grounds, the court did not address the DNC's First and Fourteenth Amendment claims.

== Supreme Court ==
=== Appeal ===
Both the state and the Republican National Committee (RNC) appealed the Ninth Circuit's decision to the Supreme Court, specifically on the applicability of Section 2 of the Voting Rights Act of 1965. With the pending appeals, the Ninth Circuit put enforcement of its decision on hold for the 2020 elections and left the policy and the law in place. The Supreme Court granted the petition for a writ of certiorari in October 2020 since it agreed to hear the case, and it consolidated the two cases (Brnovich v. DNC and Arizona Republican Party v. Democratic National Committee) for briefing and oral argument.

=== Oral arguments ===
Oral arguments were held on March 2, 2021. Observers to the oral arguments said that a primary issue discussed by the justices was the standard that should be used to evaluate when discrimination occurs under Section 2 of the VRA. Those observers stated that there was a divide between the conservative justices, who appeared ready to support the state's policies, and the Court's three liberal members, who sought ways to maintain Section 2's relevance in the VRA.

During oral arguments, Michael Carvin, an attorney representing the Arizona Republican Party, was asked by Justice Amy Coney Barrett what interest the party had in defending the Arizona voting restrictions. Carvin replied, "Because it puts us at a competitive disadvantage relative to Democrats.... Every extra vote they get through unlawful interpretation of Section 2 hurts us."

=== Decision ===
The Court issued a 6–3 decision on July 1, 2021, that reversed the Ninth Circuit's decision, with the majority ruling that neither the out-of-precinct policy nor H.B. 2023 violated Section 2 of the VRA. Also, it did not find that H.B. 2023 had been passed with the intent of racial discrimination. The majority opinion was written by Justice Samuel Alito and joined by Chief Justice John Roberts and Justices Clarence Thomas, Neil Gorsuch, Brett Kavanaugh, and Amy Coney Barrett.

Alito noted that the Supreme Court’s first interpretation of the amended Section 2 in Thornburg v. Gingles established the framework for vote-dilution claims by requiring proof that an electoral law or practice interacts with social and historical conditions to produce unequal electoral opportunities for minority voters. He further observed that the Court had not yet considered its application to generally applicable time, place, or manner voting rules, which had become increasingly common in lower court litigation.

In regards to the out-of-precinct policy, Alito stated, "Having to identify one's own polling place and then travel there to vote does not exceed the 'usual burdens of voting'" set by the VRA. He also stated that data from the 2020 election showed, "A policy that appears to work for 98% or more of voters to whom it applies — minority and non-minority alike — is unlikely to render a system unequally open.". On H.B. 2023, Alito referred to the per curiam decision in Purcell v. Gonzalez (2006): "A State indisputably has a compelling interest in preserving the integrity of its election process." He stated that the respondents had failed to show that the law had a disparate impact: "Limiting the classes of persons who may handle early ballots to those less likely to have ulterior motives deters potential fraud and improves voter confidence."

Alito's majority was seen to weaken the VRA further by limiting Section 2 through the introduction of means to review Section 2 challenges. The non-binding slip opinion stated in its syllabus, "The Court declines in these cases to announce a test to govern all VRA [Section 2] challenges to rules that specify the time, place, or manner for casting ballots. It is sufficient for present purposes to identify certain guideposts that lead to the Court's decision in these cases." Alito laid out guideposts used to evaluate the state regulations in context of Section 2, which included the size of the burden created by the rule, the degree that the rule deviates from past practices, the size of the racial imbalance, and the overall level of opportunity afforded voters in considering all election rules.

Gorsuch wrote a concurring opinion.

=== Dissent ===
Justice Elena Kagan wrote a 41-page dissenting opinion, which was joined by Justices Stephen Breyer and Sonia Sotomayor. Kagan wrote, "This Court has no right to remake Section 2 [of the VRA]. Maybe some think that vote suppression is a relic of history—and so the need for a potent Section 2 has come and gone. ... But Congress gets to make that call." Kagan further wrote "What is tragic here is that the Court has (yet again) rewritten — in order to weaken — a statute that stands as a monument to America's greatness, and protects against its basest impulses. What is tragic is that the Court has damaged a statute designed to bring about 'the end of discrimination in voting.'"

== Reactions ==
RNC Chair Ronna McDaniel called the decision as a "resounding victory for election integrity", claiming "Democrats were attempting to make Arizona ballots less secure for political gain, and the Court saw right through their partisan lies." Georgia Secretary of State Brad Raffensperger, who was defending the state's election laws under review by the US Department of Justice (DOJ) under Section 2 of the VRA, supported the Court's decision and stated that the DOJ should "heed this decision and dismiss their wrong, politically motivated lawsuit against Georgia."

US President Joe Biden said that he was "deeply disappointed" in the ruling. He said, "In a span of just eight years, the Court has now done severe damage to two of the most important provisions of the Voting Rights Act of 1965 -- a law that took years of struggle and strife to secure. After all we have been through to deliver the promise of this Nation to all Americans, we should be fully enforcing voting rights laws, not weakening them." Derrick Johnson, the president of the NAACP, called the ruling a "frontal attack on democracy" and stated that "the Court sent the clear message that vote suppressors around the country will go unchecked as they enact voting restrictions that disproportionately impact voters of color."

== Impact ==
Court observers identified that Brnovich may be a landmark Supreme Court case on voting rights, following the large amount of litigation filed prior to and after the 2020 election related to voting laws and policies and the lack of any congressional action to amend the VRA. At least 165 state bills related to election laws were introduced between the 2020 election and the end of February 2021, with 28 laws passed across 17 states when the Court's ruling was issued. Analysts claimed that some of the bills appeared purposely to restrict voting rights further and limit minority voting if they passed. They emphasized the need to strengthen the voting rights for minorities set by the VRA through the Supreme Court. Bloomberg Law found that Section 2 of the VRA was nearly 60% less likely to be cited in complaints in the 40 months following the Brnovich decision compared to 54 months before.

The Court's decision came as Congress debated an amendment to the VRA to strengthen protections for voting rights further after the 2020 election.

== See also ==
- Shelby County v. Holder (2013) A case dealing with Sections 4(b) and 5 of the VRA
- Abbott v. Perez (2018) A case dealing with Section 2 of the VRA in redistricting/gerrymandering
- Help America Vote Act (HAVA)
- National Voter Registration Act of 1993 (NVRA)
- Uniformed and Overseas Citizens Absentee Voting Act (UOCAVA)
- Voter suppression in the United States
