= Tribal council (United States) =

Native American government structure

A tribal council is the governing body for certain Native American tribes within the United States.

Many sovereign American Indian nations in the United States organize their governments through elected tribal councils.

The term usually describes the governing body of a federally recognized tribe. These councils often control lands known as Indian reservations, where some tribes may have more than one reservation while others may have none. Federally recognized tribes in the United States are considered sovereign nations or "domestic dependent nations", and they have sovereign status somewhat comparable to the individual American states, in that they fall under the jurisdiction of the U.S. federal government but not under individual states.

Different tribes have the autonomy to select their own governance structures, but most tribes have adopted democratic systems. In these systems, a Tribal Council or an equivalent body functions as a legislative branch, while an elected or appointed Chairman, Chairwoman, or Chairperson serves in an executive role comparable to that of the President at the federal level. On a few American Indian reservations such as the Hopi Reservation and the Haudenosaunee (Iroquois) reservations, a U.S.-recognized and -funded, democratically elected tribal government operates in parallel and, in some cases, in conflict with the nation's traditionalist governance.

== History ==
Tribal councils were components of many tribal governments predating colonization by the United States. The Cheyenne maintain a Council of Forty-four created by the prophet Sweet Medicine which continues today works in tandem with the elected, secular governments of the Cheyenne and Arapaho Tribes and Northern Cheyenne Tribe of the Northern Cheyenne Indian Reservation.

Many tribes drafted their constitutions and organized their tribal councils under the 1934 Indian Reorganization Act and the 1936 Oklahoma Indian Welfare Act, part of the Indian New Deal. Beginning in the 1970s and 1980s, as Native American self-determination gained momentum, many tribes amended or drafted new constitutions and reformed their tribal council structures.

== Examples ==
The two largest tribes in the United States have elected tribal councils as their legislative branches of multicameral governments. The Navajo Nation is formally governed by the Navajo Tribal Council, known today as the Navajo Nation Council. The Cherokee Nation elects its Cherokee Nation Tribal Council.

Most other tribes also have elected tribal councils. The Crow Tribe of Montana is governed by the Crow Tribal Council, consisting of three governmental branches, the executive, legislative, and judicial branches.

The Ho-Chunk Nation maintains their traditional government based on their clan system while they have also established four governmental branches of executive, legislative, judicial, and a general council, established through their 1963 and 1994 constitutions.

== External organizations ==
While tribal councils are governmental structures within tribes, different tribes also form organizations to mediate and achieve their shared goals. The All Pueblo Council of Governors represents tribal governments, cultural issues, and advocacy on state and federal legislation on behalf of the 20 current Pueblos of the Pueblo peoples, of which 19 pueblos are in the state of New Mexico, and one is in Texas.

The Inter Tribal Council of Arizona is a nonprofit organization founded in 1952 to represent the interests of the 21 tribes with lands in Arizona.

Many States have government offices to work with tribes with lands in their state. For example, the Minnesota Indian Affairs Council works with the 11 tribes with lands in Minnesota.

== See also ==
- National Congress of American Indians
