= John Lewis Voting Rights Act =

Proposed voting rights legislation

John R. Lewis Voting Rights Advancement Act of 2025
- Long title: An Act to amend the Voting Rights Act of 1965 to revise the criteria for determining which States and political subdivisions are subject to section 4 of the Act, and for other purposes.
- Sponsored by: Terri Sewell (D-AL)
- Number of co-sponsors: 218

Citations
- Public law: 52 USC Ch. 103

Codification
- Acts affected: Voting Rights Act of 1965

Legislative history
- Committee consideration by House Committee on the Judiciary

The John R. Lewis Voting Rights Advancement Act of 2025 (H.R. 14 and S. 2523) are companion bills put before the U.S. House of Representation (H.R.14) and the U.S. Senate (S. 2523) re-establishing voting rights under new legislation which had been struck down by the Supreme Court in 2013 (Shelby v. Holder). The new legislation is named after Civil Rights Activist John Lewis. The bills seek to restore and strengthen parts of the Voting Rights Act of 1965, most notably its requirement for states and jurisdictions with a history of voting rights violations to seek federal approval before enacting certain changes to their voting laws. The bill addresses Section 4(b) of the Voting Rights Act, or the pre-clearance formula that was used to determine which jurisdictions were subject to that requirement.

==== Tracing U.S. Senate Bill 2523 ====
On July 29, 2025, the Senate Committee on the Judiciary received a request to restore protections under the Voting Rights Act of 1965 via S. 2523, introduced and referred to as the John R. Lewis Voting Rights Advancement Act of 2025, by revising “...the criteria for determining which States and political subdivisions are subject to section 4 of the Act…”. Although previous iterations of this legislation have proceeded through the hearing process, S.2523 has not. For example, on August 24, 2021, the U.S. House of Representatives passed H.R. 4 the John R. Lewis Voting Advancement Rights Act of 2021 by a margin of 219–212. On November 3, 2021, the bill failed to pass the Senate after falling short of the 60 votes needed to invoke cloture. A second attempt to pass it on January 19, 2022, as part of a combined bill with the Freedom to Vote Act, also failed. Again falling short of the 60 votes needed to invoke cloture, the bill then failed to pass a vote to be exempted from Senate filibuster rules. By comparison, the John R. Lewis Voting Advancement Rights Act of 2025, or Senate Bill 2523, has yet to proceed to a Senate Hearing and committee markup to advance an updated Section 4(b) coverage formula that would restore Section 5 preclearance requirements for jurisdictions meeting the bill’s criteria.

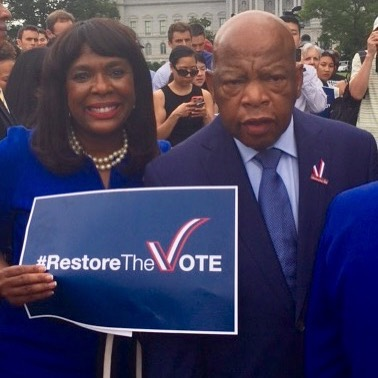
Representatives Terri Sewell and John Lewis in 2017 on the fourth anniversary of the Shelby County v. Holder decision

== Background ==
=== Shelby County v. Holder ===
Section 5 of the Voting Rights Act of 1965 (also known as the VRA) stated that some jurisdictions needed to seek approval from the federal government to implement certain changes to their election laws. Section 4(b) had the formula for determining which jurisdictions were subjected to this requirement. It applied the requirement to any jurisdiction that had voting tests in place on November 1, 1964, and a turnout of less than 50% in the 1964 presidential election. To receive approval for new election laws, the jurisdiction would have to prove to either a three-judge panel of a Washington, D.C. court or the US Attorney General that the new procedure would not negatively impact the right to vote based on race or other minority status.

On June 25, 2013, the United States Supreme Court struck down section 4(b) by a 5–4 decision in the case of Shelby County v. Holder. The court found Section 4(b) of the VRA unconstitutional because it was outdated. Invalidating section 4(b) left the federal pre-clearance requirement in Section 5 without a formula to determine what jurisdictions were subject to it. This had the effect of rendering the pre-clearance requirement inoperant until a new formula replaced the one that was struck down.

In response to Shelby County v. Holder, H.R. 14 and S.2523 would “...establish new criteria for determining which states and political subdivisions must obtain preclearance before changes to voting practices may take effect” and defines preclearance as “... the process of receiving preapproval from the Department of Justice (DOJ)... before making legal changes that would affect voting rights”. Why this legislation is critical now, S. 2523's sponsor, Senator Durbin (D-IL) refers to recent and increased attempts since 2020 of voter suppression, or disfranchisement. The senator noted that “... between the Trump Administration’s executive order on voter registration and state legislatures gerrymandering districts, there has been a clear, concerted effort to chip away at the protections guaranteed to every American under the Voting Rights Act”.

=== Voting laws enacted after the Shelby decision ===
The Supreme Court ruling allowed many states to begin putting in new restrictive laws regarding the right to vote. Texas had announced it would put in place a strict voter I.D. law less than 24 hours after the Supreme Court decision was announced. (Note: "Strict", meaning that a voter would have to present (any) government-issued ID at a polling place before being allowed to cast a ballot.) Many other states that were previously not allowed to enact voter I.D. laws because of the VRA's federal pre-clearance requirement were able to do so.

The Supreme Court decision has also led to an increase in voters being purged from voter rolls. Research from the Brennan Center suggests that some 2 million more people were purged from voter rolls between 2012 and 2016 than would have been if Section 5 of the VRA had been left in place. The organization also stated that the gap in turnout between white and non-white voters was the smallest in the 2012 presidential election, the last one before the Shelby decision, and had been growing ever since.

Notably, North Carolina passed HB 589, (Note: North Carolina was not covered as a whole by the VRA. However, North Carolina would be covered as a whole under the John Lewis Voting Rights Act.) a bill which put in a strict photo I.D. requirement, eliminated same-day voting registration, and shortened the early voting period, among other restrictive policies. One policy in particular limited early voting on Sundays, which North Carolina admitted in court was because counties that offered it were likely to have higher black populations. HB 589 was struck down by the U.S. Court of Appeals for the Fourth Circuit on the basis that the law was designed to "target African-Americans with almost surgical precision".

For the US Government to be able to prevent more restrictive laws from being passed without federal pre-clearance, it would need to find a new formula for the Voting Rights Act that would satisfy the Shelby County v. Holder decision, which is what the John Lewis Voting Rights Act was written to do.

=== Voting laws enacted after the 2020 election ===
After the 2020 presidential election and efforts to overturn it, many Republican-controlled state legislatures began passing bills that made it harder to vote, which opponents of the bills alleged would disproportionately deter racial minorities from voting.

== Key provisions ==
=== Updates to Section 2 ===
The first provision in the John Lewis Voting Rights Act strengthens voter protections in Section 2 in response to Brnovich v. Democratic National Committee.

=== Broadening the scope of the courts ===
The next portion in the John Lewis Voting Rights Act broadens cases in which the U.S. Attorney General may send federal observers to jurisdictions the courts have deemed necessary, as well as allow for the courts to block all new election policy in a wider range of circumstances. It does so by amending applicable portions of the VRA that say "violations of the 14th and 15th Amendment" to also include "violations of this Act, or violations of any federal law that prohibits discrimination in voting on the basis of race, color, or membership in a language minority group."

=== Restoring federal pre-clearance ===
The next portion of the act reinstates the federal pre-clearance requirement for new election procedures in certain states by creating a new formula that satisfies Shelby County v. Holder. The act's new formula would subject jurisdictions that meet these criteria to the requirement:

1. Any state that has had 15 or more voting rights violations within the last 25 years.
2. Any state that has had 10 or more voting rights violations, provided that at least 1 of those violations were committed by the state itself (as opposed to a jurisdiction within the state) within the last 25 years.
3. Any subdivision in a state that has had 3 or more voting rights violations within the last 25 years.

The act counts any of the following as a voting rights violation:

1. A standing court ruling that has found denial or abridgement of the right to vote on account of race, color, or being in a "language minority group" in a way that violates the 14th or 15th amendments anywhere within the state or subdivision.
2. A standing court decision that has found that an election law or procedure that was enacted (or would have been enacted if not blocked by court action) would have abridged the right to vote on account of race, color, or being in a "language minority group" in a way that violates the act itself anywhere in a state or subdivision.
3. A standing court decision that denied a declaratory request and prevented any new election policy or procedure from taking effect anywhere within the state or subdivision.
4. The attorney general has a standing objection that prevented any new election policy or procedure from taking effect anywhere within the state or subdivision.
5. A settlement or consent decree caused the state or subdivision to alter or abandon a voting policy, if the policy was challenged because it abridged the right to vote on the account of race, color, or "membership in a language minority" in a way that violates the act itself or the 14th or 15th amendments.

The act states that the attorney general will make the determinations as early as can be practiced within a calendar year, and keep an updated list of all voting rights violations. The determination becomes effective when it is published in the Federal Register.

Representatives Terri Sewell, John Lewis, and Judy Chu speak on the bill in 2017

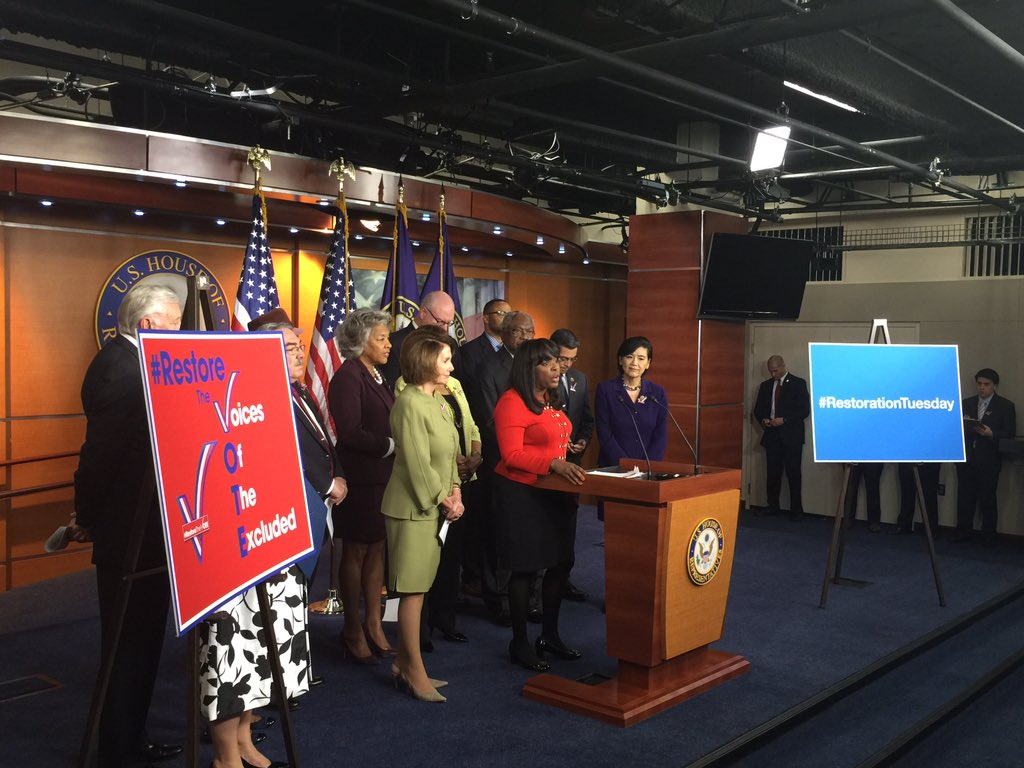
Terri Sewell speaks at a Restore the Vote press conference in 2015

Comparison of states requiring pre-clearance at the time of the Shelby County decision with those which would require it under the John Lewis Voting Rights Act
State	Covered by VRA of 1965	Covered by John Lewis VRA (Note: John Lewis VRA coverage predictions are for "states as a whole" only, meaning this prediction does not consider subdivisions in a state that may be required to comply.)
Alabama	As a whole	As a whole
Alaska	As a whole	Not covered
Arizona	As a whole	Not covered
California	Certain counties	As a whole
Florida	Certain counties	As a whole
Georgia	As a whole	As a whole
Louisiana	As a whole	As a whole
Michigan	Certain townships	Not covered
Mississippi	As a whole	As a whole
New York	Certain counties	As a whole
North Carolina	Certain counties	As a whole
South Dakota	Certain counties	Not covered
South Carolina	As a whole	As a whole
Texas	As a whole	As a whole
Virginia	As a whole	As a whole

=== Expanding covered practices ===
The bill would also expand the changes to election procedure that would require federal pre-clearance, occasionally with unique standards for being subject to the requirement (i.e. the percentage of the population that is considered a racial minority).

==== Election seats and jurisdiction boundary changes ====
Any state or subdivision that has either:

1. Two or more racial or language minorities that each represent 20% or more of the voting-age population.
2. A single language minority that represents 20% or more of the voting-age population on Native-American lands that are located entirely or partially in the state or subdivision.

Must get federal pre-clearance before implementing any of the following policies:

1. Changes to the number of seats that are elected at-large in the state or subdivision.
2. Conversion of one or more seats from a single-member district to one or more at-large districts or to multi-member districts.
3. Any change (or series of changes) to the boundaries of a jurisdiction that reduces by 3 or more percentage points the proportion of the voting-age population of any one racial or language minority group.

==== Redistricting ====
Any change to the boundaries of electoral districts in a state or subdivision would need federal pre-clearance if they meet either of the criteria:

1. The state or subdivision had a population increase of 10,000 or more in any racial or language minority since the previous census.
2. Any racial or language minority sees an increase of at least 20% of the size of the voting age population since the previous census.

==== Voter I.D. requirements ====
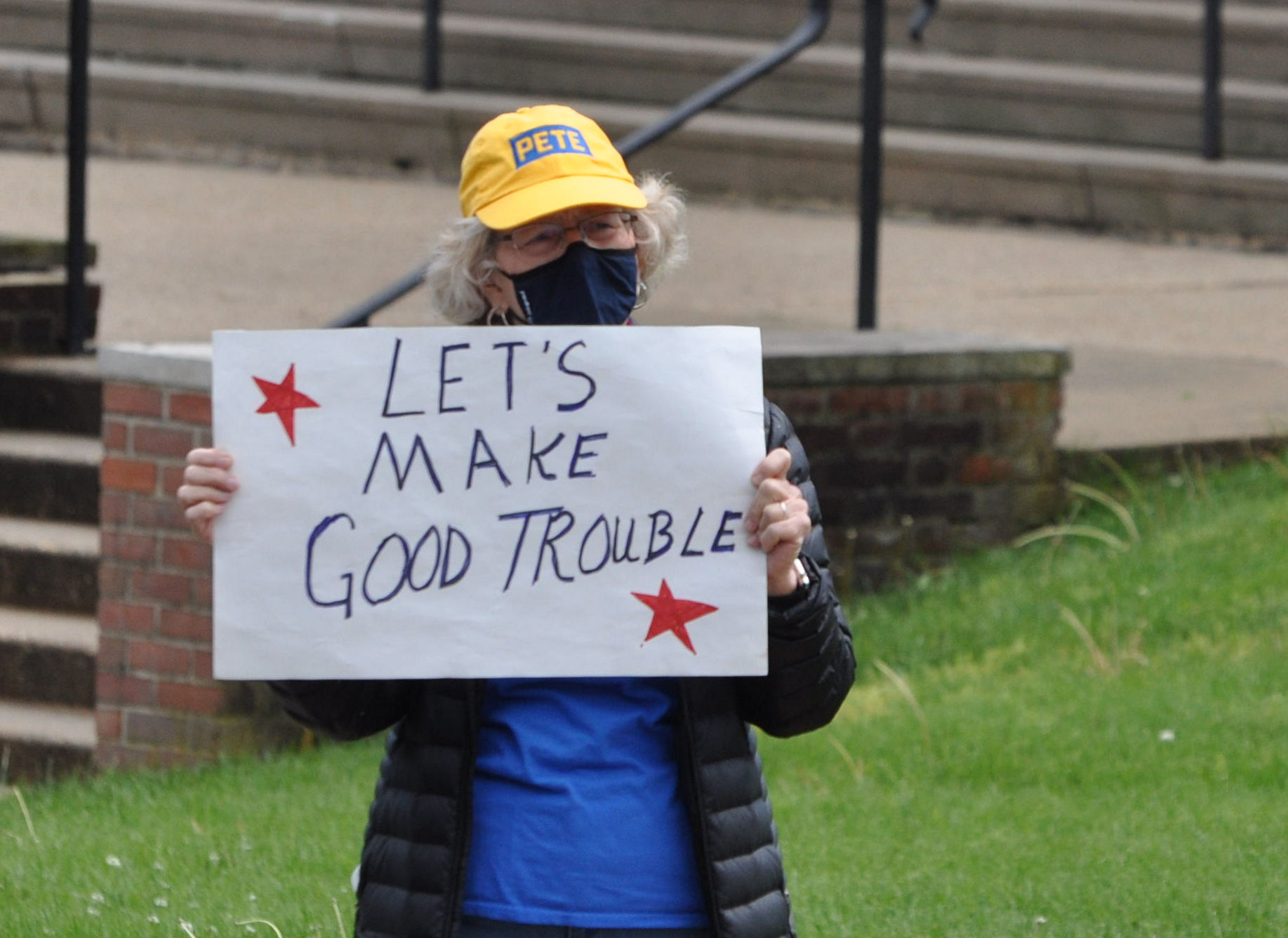
Protestor uses John Lewis's signature catchphrase at a protest in favor of voting rights

Any change to voter I.D. requirements that is stricter than the one described in the Help America Vote Act, or any change that will make voter I.D. requirements more stringent than on the day the John Lewis Voting Rights Act is enacted, would be required to seek federal pre-clearance before being implemented.

==== Multi-lingual voting materials ====
Any alteration that reduces the amount of multi-lingual voting materials or changes the way in which multi-lingual voting materials are given out to people would need to seek federal pre-clearance, unless a similar alteration occurs in the English voting materials for an election.

==== Voting locations and voting opportunities ====
Any change that would reduce, relocate, or consolidate voting locations (including early, absentee, and election day voting locations), or reduce the number of days or hours of early voting on Sundays would be subjected to the pre-clearance requirement if they meet either of these criteria:

1. Census data finds that two or more racial or language minority groups each make up 20% of the voting age population in the jurisdiction.
2. Census data finds that 20% of the voting-age population on a Native-Americans land is in one language minority group.

==== Voter roll maintenance ====
Any change to election policy that adds a new reason to remove a person from a voter roll or puts in place a new process to remove a person from the voter roll must seek federal pre-clearance (if it is a jurisdiction within the state):

1. Two racial or language minorities make up 20% of the population.
2. 20% of the population is a single language minority on Native-American lands.

And if the state itself is imposing such a change then it must seek pre-clearance if:

1. The population of the state contains 2 minorities that make up 20% of the population.
2. A subdivision in the state meets the same requirements, but the subdivision itself would be the only place affected.

=== Pre-clearance for states already covered ===
For the states that already met the requirements for federal pre-clearance under the new formula provided, the bill states that they will also have to seek approval for any new procedure under the new covered practices. It allows states that are covered to seek approval from a three-judge panel or the Attorney General, and allows any appeals of either of these to go to the Supreme Court.

=== Enforcement ===
The bill allows both the Attorney General or any ordinary person to sue a state if they believe that they are avoiding federal pre-clearance. The act says that a three-judge panel will determine if a policy needs federal pre-clearance, and until the court has made that determination, the policy is blocked from going into effect.

== Reactions and statements ==
External videos
- President Joe Biden advises Congress to pass John Lewis Voting Rights Act

=== Support ===
The bill has been supported by Senators Raphael Warnock (who used to his first floor speech to advocate for its passage), and Joe Manchin. (Note: Every Senate Democrat had also shown support for the bill in 2020 by having co-sponsored it, but these are some of the most outspoken advocates for passage.) President Joe Biden advocated for the passage of the bill in his first address to Congress. Senator Jeff Merkley said that the best way to honor the legacy of John Lewis was to pass the bill, and tweeted that passing the bill was his "top priority". Senator Richard Blumenthal cited several recent restrictive voting laws as being part of the reason for his support. Pennsylvania Governor Tom Wolf also called on the Senate to pass the bill, and to consider "suspending" the filibuster if it was necessary for it to pass.

In July 2021, over 150 companies signed a letter supporting the John R. Lewis Voting Rights Advancement Act, including Amazon, Apple, Best Buy, PepsiCo, IKEA, Nestlé USA, Macy's, and Target, among many others.

The Human Rights Campaign supported the bill, noting how LGBTQ voters, especially transgender voters, can face discrimination or disenfranchisement. The Brennan Center for Justice supported the bill, citing a rise in racially discriminatory voting policies after Shelby County v. Holder. The NAACP passed a resolution in October 2025 calling for Congress to pass the bill. The American Civil Liberties Union also supported passage of the bill.

=== Opposition ===
Senate Republican Leader Mitch McConnell has expressed opposition to passage of the bill, and said that its passage is "unnecessary" because there is currently "no threat to the voting rights law". Republicans have argued that the act is an attempt to federalize control of state elections to the Democrats' advantage.

== Legislative history ==
=== Summary ===
Congress	Short title	Bill number(s)	Date introduced	Sponsor(s)	# of cosponsors	Latest status
114th Congress	Voting Rights Advancement Act of 2015	H.R. 2867	June 24, 2015	Terri Sewell (D-AL)	179	Died in committee
115th Congress	Voting Rights Advancement Act of 2017	H.R. 2978	June 21, 2017	Terri Sewell (D-AL)	193	Died in committee
116th Congress	John R. Lewis Voting Rights Act of 2020	H.R. 4	February 26, 2019	Terri Sewell (D-AL)	229	Passed the House (228-187)
116th Congress	John Lewis Voting Rights Advancement Act	S. 4263	July 22, 2020	Patrick Leahy (D-VT)	47	Died in committee
117th Congress	John R. Lewis Voting Rights Advancement Act of 2021	H.R. 4	August 17, 2021	Terri Sewell (D-AL)	223	Passed the House (219-212)
117th Congress	John R. Lewis Voting Rights Advancement Act of 2021	S. 4	October 5, 2021	Patrick Leahy (D-VT)	48	Cloture not invoked (50-49)
117th Congress	Freedom to Vote: John R. Lewis Act	H.R. 5746	October 27, 2021	Don Beyer (D-VA)	5	Cloture not invoked (52-48)
118th Congress	John R. Lewis Voting Rights Advancement Act of 2023	H.R. 14	September 19, 2023	Terri Sewell (D-AL)	215	Died in committee
118th Congress	John R. Lewis Voting Rights Advancement Act of 2023	S.4	February 29, 2024	Richard Durbin (D-IL)	49	Died in committee
119th Congress	John R. Lewis Voting Rights Advancement Act of 2025	H.R. 14	March 5, 2025	Terri Sewell (D-AL)	218	Referred to committees of Jurisdiction

=== 116th Congress ===
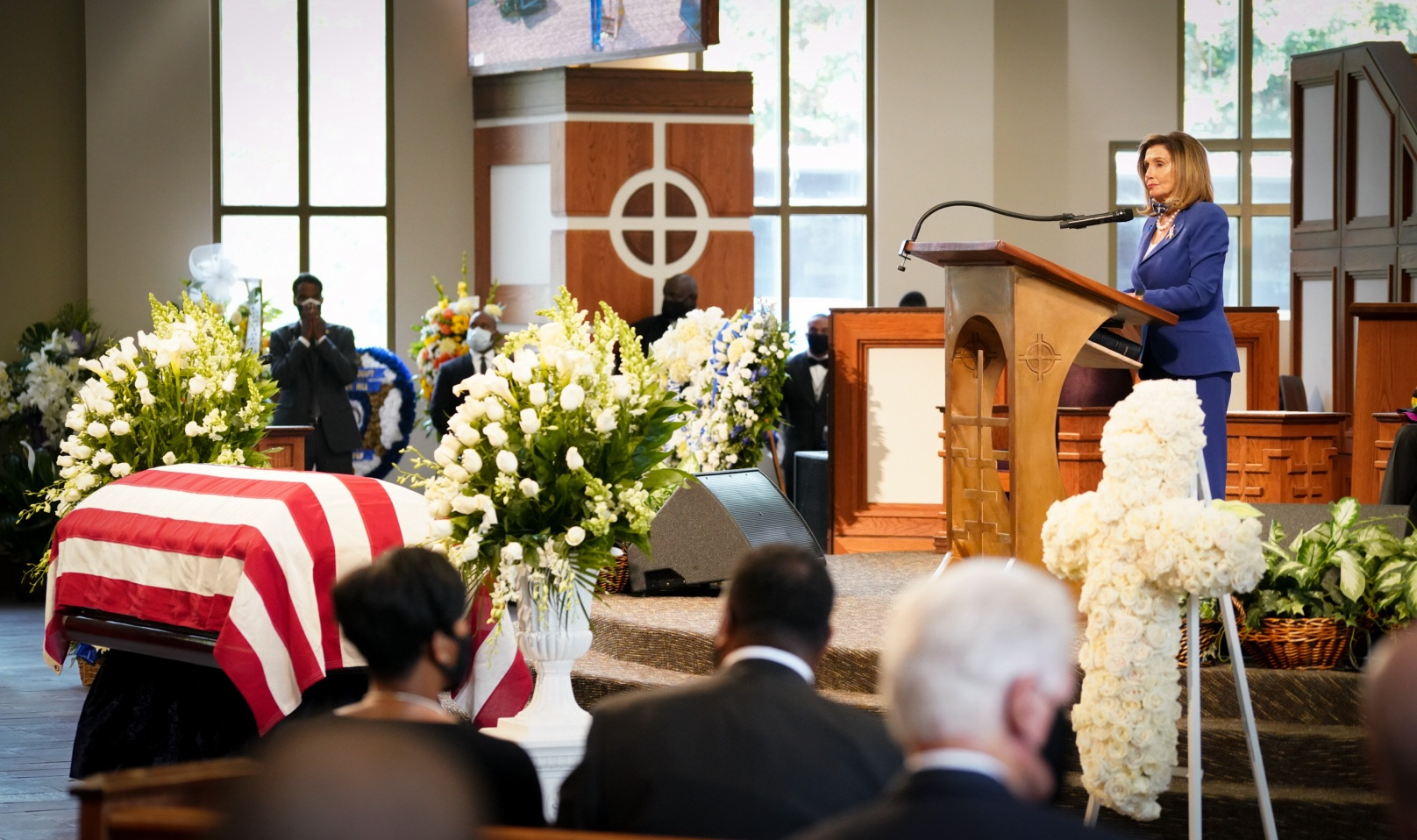
House Speaker Nancy Pelosi speaks at the funeral service for John Lewis

The bill was introduced in the House of Representatives by Rep. Terri Sewell on February 26, 2019, as H.R. 4. Originally planned to have been included in the For the People Act, Democratic leadership decided to keep it separate because of anticipated court challenges. The bill had 229 co-sponsors. The bill passed the House of Representatives (228–187) as the Voting Rights Advancement Act of 2019 on December 6, 2019. All Democrats voted in favor of the legislation, and all but one Republican voted against it.

The bill was introduced in the Senate as S.4263 by Senator Patrick Leahy after John Lewis' death in July 2020. The bill received 47 co-sponsors. All Democrats in the Senate had co-sponsored the bill. (Note: This assessment counts the bill's original sponsor, Patrick Leahy.) The only Republican to co-sponsor the bill was Lisa Murkowski. The Senate, which was controlled by Republicans, did not bring the bill up for a vote.

The bill was originally titled the Voting Rights Advancement Act of 2019, but was renamed the John Lewis Voting Rights Act one week after his death in 2020. No senator had introduced the bill into the Senate at the time of his death, so when it was introduced in the Senate, it took his name. The bill had already passed the House of Representatives under its former name before John Lewis's death. H.Con.Res.107 was agreed to in the House to change the short title of the bill to the John R. Lewis Voting Rights Act.

=== 117th Congress ===
The act was introduced in the House on August 17, 2021 by Terri Sewell. It received 223 co-sponsors. The bill passed the House of Representatives on August 24, 2021 (219–212). All Democrats voted in favor of the legislation, and all Republicans voted against it. The bill later failed in the Senate after it was unable to receive enough votes to invoke cloture. A second attempt, where Democrats embedded the act into a combined bill with the Freedom to Vote Act, also failed. Democrats then attempted to change the rules to exempt the bill from the filibuster, but Senators Joe Manchin and Kyrsten Sinema opposed the change.

== State-level laws ==
In August 2026, Delaware passed a state-level law called the "Deleware John Lewis Voting Rights Act". It specified that discriminatory intent did not have to be proven. It allows the Delaware Attorney General, organizations, and citizens to file complaints against jurisdictions and agencies that engage in discriminatory practices. It also specifies that courts should interpret ambiguous laws in the way most favorable to voting access.

== See also ==
- Amendments to the Voting Rights Act of 1965
- Black suffrage in the United States
- Brnovich v. Democratic National Committee
- For the People Act
- Shelby County v. Holder
- Voting Rights Act of 1965
- Voting rights in the United States
- Voter suppression in the United States
