= Native American Voting Rights Act of 2018 =

On October 3, 2018, Senator Tom Udall, vice chairman of the Senate Committee on Indian Affairs, introduced the Native American Voting Rights Act of 2018 (S. 3543) with 13 co-sponsors. An identical bill was introduced in the House of Representatives by Ben Ray Luján (HR 7127). The legislation sought to ensure equal voting access to Native Americans through several measures:

1. Established a Native American Voting Rights Task Force which would fund tribal-state consortiums to bolster Native American voter registration and participation among tribal communities,
2. Cited the Shelby County ruling and prohibited states from "undertaking discriminatory actions without Department of Justice agreement,"
3. Included provisions to increase Native access to voter registration sites and polling locations, and
4. Allowed tribal ID cards to be used as ID for voting purposes.

The legislation cited a lack of accessible registration and polling sites, the absence of reliable and affordable broadband connectivity, and restrictions on the time and place that people can register and vote, and the manner in which people can register and vote, including unequal opportunities for absentee, early, mail in, and in-person voting; nontraditional addresses for residents on Indian reservations, inadequate language assistance for Tribal members, and voter identification laws that discriminate against Native Americans.

The specific issue of nontraditional addresses for residents on Indian reservations was addressed on October 9, 2018 by the US Supreme Court. In a 6-2 ruling the Court allowed a lower court ruling to stand which upheld state legislation requiring residents of North Dakota to provide an ID displaying a residential address rather than a P.O. box number to vote. The original court case, Brakebill v. Jeager, surrounded a 2017 North Dakota state law (HB 1369) requiring voters to provide identification including the voter’s legal name, current residential street address and date of birth.

Six Native American plaintiffs sued the Secretary challenging the statute on grounds that it violated the Equal Protection Clause of the Fourteenth Amendment and Section 2 of the Voting Rights Act. The plaintiffs contended that Native American communities often lack residential street addresses or do not have clear residential addresses, and therefore rely on P.O. boxes for addresses which should be allowed. Both the district and appellate courts agreed that at least 69,616 eligible North Dakota voters—including 4,998 Native Americans—lacked the identification required to vote. However, the court ruled that even though some communities lack residential street addresses, it did not justify a statewide injunction preventing the Secretary from requiring a form of identification with a residential street address from the vast majority of residents who have residential street addresses.

== See also ==
- Indian Citizenship Act
- Native American voting rights
