= Arizona v. Inter Tribal Council of Arizona, Inc. =

- Supreme Court of the United States

Argued March 18, 2013 Decided June 17, 2013
- Full case name: Arizona, et al., Petitioners v. The Inter Tribal Council of Arizona, Inc., et al.
- Docket no.: 12-71
- Citations: 570 U.S. 1 (more) 133 S. Ct. 2247; 186 L. Ed. 2d 239

Case history
- Prior: Gonzalez v. Arizona, 624 F.3d 1162 (9th Cir. 2010); on rehearing en banc, 677 F.3d 383 (9th Cir. 2012); cert. granted, 568 U.S. 962 (2012).

Holding
- Arizona's evidence-of-citizenship requirement, as applied to Federal Form applicants, is pre-empted by the National Voter Registration Act's mandate for states "accept and use" the Federal Form.

Court membership
- Chief Justice John Roberts Associate Justices Antonin Scalia · Anthony Kennedy; Clarence Thomas · Ruth Bader Ginsburg; Stephen Breyer · Samuel Alito; Sonia Sotomayor · Elena Kagan

Case opinions
- Majority: Scalia, joined by Roberts, Ginsburg, Breyer, Sotomayor, Kagan; Kennedy (in part)
- Concurrence: Kennedy (in part)
- Dissent: Thomas
- Dissent: Alito

Laws applied
- National Voter Registration Act & Elections Clause

Arizona v. Inter Tribal Council of Arizona, Inc., 570 U.S. 1 (2013), is a 2012-term United States Supreme Court case revolving around Arizona's unique voter registration requirements, including the necessity of providing documentary proof of citizenship. In a 7–2 decision, the Supreme Court held that Arizona's registration requirements were unlawful because they were preempted by federal voting laws.

== Background ==
The Arizona voter registration requirements arose from a 2004 Arizona proposition, Arizona Proposition 200 (2004), which was a ballot initiative designed in part "to combat voter fraud by requiring voters to present proof of citizenship when they register to vote and to present identification when they vote on election day." The state law requires, besides other things, persons to provide proof of citizenship to register to vote, and requires voter-registration officials to "reject" any application for registration, including a Federal Form under the National Voter Registration Act of 1993, that is not accompanied by documentary evidence of citizenship.

A group of Arizona residents and a group of nonprofit organizations challenged the Arizona law in court. The District Court of Arizona granted Arizona summary judgment on the respondents' claim that the federal Act preempts Arizona's requirement. In October 2010, the Ninth Circuit Court reversed, holding that the state's requirement of documentary proof of citizenship is invalid as being preempted by the registration provision in the federal NVRA, at least when an applicant uses the National Mail Voter Registration Form (the "Federal Form") to register to vote in federal elections, and that the requirement to provide voter identification at the polling place is valid.

However, in April 2011, the court granted Arizona's petition for en banc review of this ruling, and it heard oral arguments on June 21, 2011. In April 2012, the en banc court also held that the requirement to provide proof of citizenship to register to vote is invalid as preempted by the NVRA and that the requirement to provide voter identification at the polling place is valid. The Supreme Court of the United States declined to stay the ruling on June 28, 2012. In July 2012, Arizona petitioned the Supreme Court for a writ of certiorari to review the Ninth Circuit's ruling. The Supreme Court granted the petition in October 2012, and it heard oral arguments on March 18, 2013.

== Opinion of the Court ==
On June 17, 2013, the Supreme Court ruled against Arizona in a 7–2 decision, which struck down the state law. Justice Scalia wrote the majority opinion, affirming the Ninth Circuit's rulings and holding that the state requirements relating to voter registrations were pre-empted by the federal NVRA law, which mandates states to "accept and use" the Federal Form. Justices Clarence Thomas and Samuel Alito dissented. However, the Court also suggested ways for Arizona to overcome the hurdle. The 7–2 decision stated “Arizona is correct that the Elections Clause empowers Congress to regulate how federal elections are held, but not who may vote in them. The latter is the province of the states.” However, because Attorney General Tom Horne’s predecessor as Attorney General had not appealed an adverse decision by the commission, the case was sent back for a new petition to the commission to be appealed. It was consolidated with a 10th circuit case, which ruled adversely, and the Supreme Court chose not to review a second time. The Court also held that Arizona may petition to have more requirements added to the federal standard.

Considered with the text of the House Electors Qualifications Clause of Article I, Section II, the Elections Clause of Article II, Section I, and the 17th Amendment, the Court's concluded that the Elections Clause of Article I, Section IV "empowers Congress to regulate how federal elections are held, but not who may vote in them" and that the holding in Oregon v. Mitchell (1970) on Section 302 of the Voting Rights Act Amendments of 1970 that permitted Congress to preempt state voter qualifications for minimum voting age in federal elections under the Equal Protection Clause was of minimal precedential value to the decision.

== See also ==
- List of United States Supreme Court cases, volume 570
