= Shelby County v. Holder =

2013 landmark United States Supreme Court case

- Supreme Court of the United States

Argued February 27, 2013 Decided June 25, 2013
- Full case name: Shelby County, Alabama, Petitioner v. Eric H. Holder, Jr., Attorney General, et al.
- Docket no.: 12-96
- Citations: 570 U.S. 529 (more) 133 S. Ct. 2612; 186 L. Ed. 2d 651
- Argument: Oral argument
- Opinion announcement: Opinion announcement

Case history
- Prior: Petition denied, 811 F. Supp. 2d 424 (D.D.C. 2011).; Affirmed, 679 F.3d 848 (D.C. Cir. 2012).; Cert. granted, 568 U.S. 1006 (2012).
- Subsequent: Remanded, 541 F. App'x 1 (D.C. Cir. 2013).; Motion for attorneys' fees denied, 43 F. Supp. 3d 47 (D.D.C. 2014).; Affirmed sub. nom., Shelby County v. Lynch, 799 F.3d 1173 (D.C. Cir. 2015).; Cert. denied, 577 U.S. 1119 (2016).

Questions presented
- Whether Congress' decision to reauthorize Section 5 of the Voting Rights Act under the pre-existing coverage formula of Section 4(b) of the Voting Rights Act exceeded its authority under the Fifteenth Amendment and thus violated the Tenth Amendment and Article IV of the United States Constitution.

Holding
- Section 4 of the Voting Rights Act of 1965 (52 U.S.C. § 10303) is unconstitutional; its formula can no longer be used as a basis for subjecting jurisdictions to preclearance.

Court membership
- Chief Justice John Roberts Associate Justices Antonin Scalia · Anthony Kennedy; Clarence Thomas · Ruth Bader Ginsburg; Stephen Breyer · Samuel Alito; Sonia Sotomayor · Elena Kagan

Case opinions
- Majority: Roberts, joined by Scalia, Kennedy, Thomas, Alito
- Concurrence: Thomas
- Dissent: Ginsburg, joined by Breyer, Sotomayor, Kagan

Laws applied
- U.S. Const. amends. XIV, XV; Voting Rights Act of 1965

Shelby County v. Holder, 570 U.S. 529 (2013), is a landmark decision of the Supreme Court of the United States regarding the constitutionality of two provisions of the Voting Rights Act of 1965: Section 5, which requires certain states and local governments to obtain federal preclearance before implementing any changes to their voting laws or practices; and subsection (b) of Section 4, which contains the coverage formula that determines which jurisdictions are subject to preclearance based on their histories of racial discrimination in voting.

On June 25, 2013, the Court ruled by a 5 to 4 vote that Section 4(b) was unconstitutional because the coverage formula was based on data over 40 years old, making it no longer responsive to current needs and therefore an impermissible burden on the constitutional principles of federalism and equal sovereignty of the states. The Court did not strike down Section 5, but without Section 4(b), no jurisdiction will be subject to Section 5 preclearance unless Congress enacts a new coverage formula.

Claims have been made that the ruling has made it easier for state officials to engage in voter suppression. Research shows that preclearance led to increases in minority congressional representation and minority voter turnout. Five years after the ruling, nearly 1,000 U.S. polling places had closed, many of them in predominantly African-American counties. There were also cuts to early voting, purges of voter rolls, and imposition of strict voter ID laws. A 2026 study found that the ruling increased the racial turnout gap, translating to hundreds of thousands of uncast ballots by voters of color in the 2022 election.

These effects were concentrated in counties previously restrained by preclearance. A 2011 study in the American Political Science Review found that changing and reducing voting locations can reduce voter turnout. In response to the ruling, some states have enacted State Voting Rights Acts that include comprehensive state-level preclearance programs modeled after Section 5 of the Voting Rights Act.

== Background ==
Congress enacted the Voting Rights Act of 1965 to address entrenched racial discrimination in voting, "an insidious and pervasive evil which had been perpetuated in certain parts of our country through unremitting and ingenious defiance of the Constitution". Section 5 of the Act requires certain states and local governments to obtain federal approval, or "preclearance", before changing voting laws or practices, to ensure the proposed changes do not "deny or abridge the right to vote on account of race, color, or membership in a language minority group". A preclearance determination must be issued by either the United States Attorney General or a panel of three judges serving on the United States District Court for the District of Columbia. Section 4(b) specifies the "coverage formula", or criteria, used to determine which states and local jurisdictions are subject to preclearance under Section 5. A jurisdiction is covered if a prohibited "test or device" was a requirement for voting or registering to vote as of November 1964, 1968, or 1972, and less than half of the eligible voting population was registered to vote or had voted in that year's election. Section 4(a) allows covered jurisdictions to "bail out" of the preclearance requirement if they made sufficient progress in ending discriminatory voting practices.

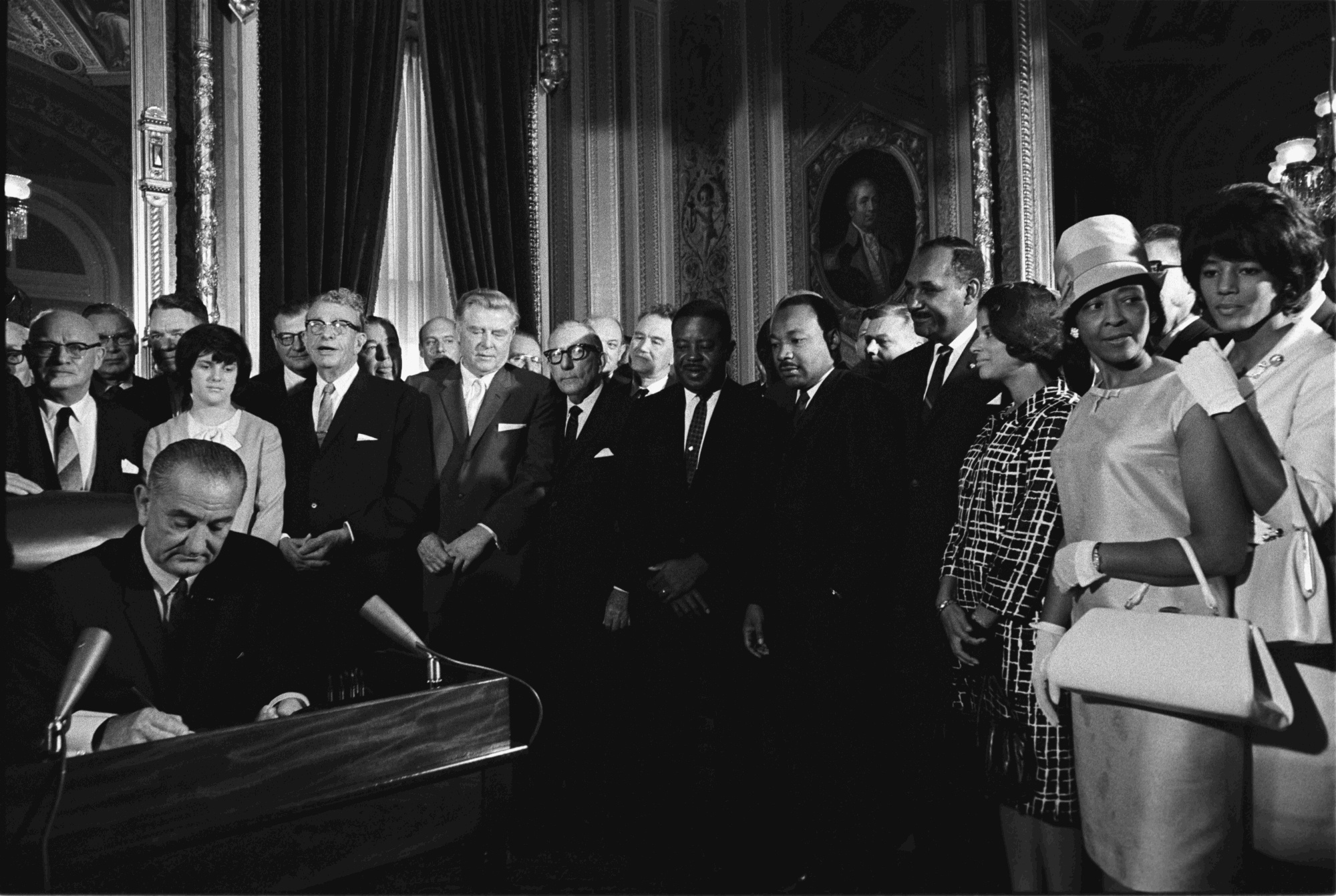
United States President Lyndon B. Johnson, Martin Luther King Jr., and Rosa Parks at the signing of the Voting Rights Act on August 6, 1965

The Supreme Court upheld the preclearance requirement and coverage formula as constitutional enforcement legislation under Section 2 of the Fifteenth Amendment in South Carolina v. Katzenbach (1966). The preclearance requirement initially was set to expire five years after enactment, but amendments to the Act in 1970, 1975, and 1982 reauthorized Section 5; the 1970 and 1975 amendments also updated the coverage formula. The Supreme Court upheld these reauthorizations as constitutional in United States v. Georgia (1973), City of Rome v. United States (1980), and Lopez v. Monterey County (1999). In 2006, Congress reauthorized Section 5 for an additional 25 years, but did not change the coverage formula from the 1975 version.

Shortly after the 2006 reauthorization, a Texas utility district sought to bail out from Section 5 preclearance and, in the alternative, challenged the constitutionality of Section 5. The Supreme Court ruled unanimously in Northwest Austin Municipal Utility District No. 1 v. Holder that government entities that did not register voters, such as the utility district, had the right to file suit to bail out of coverage. Because this decision resolved the issue, the Court invoked constitutional avoidance and declined to address the constitutionality of Section 5. Justice Clarence Thomas dissented from this portion of the opinion and would have declared Section 5 unconstitutional.

== History ==
Jurisdictions under Section 5 oversight at the time of the Shelby County v. Holder decision: State or county covered under Section 5 Jurisdiction bailed out under Section 4 within a state covered under Section 5 County with township covered under Section 5

=== District Court ===
Shelby County, in the covered jurisdiction of Alabama, sued the U.S. Attorney General in the U.S. District Court for D.C. in Washington, D.C., seeking a declaratory judgment that sections 4(b) and 5 are facially unconstitutional and a permanent injunction against their enforcement. On September 21, 2011, Judge John D. Bates upheld the provisions, finding that the evidence before Congress in 2006 was sufficient to justify reauthorizing Section 5 and continuing Section 4(b)'s coverage formula.

Arguing before Bates were Kristen Clarke, who argued that it was reasonable for Congress to "stay the course" in renewing Section 5 of the Voting Rights Act in order to root out discrimination, and Bert Rein, a lawyer for Shelby County, who argued that the environment in the country was "totally different" when Section 5 was first enacted.

=== Court of Appeals ===
On May 18, 2012, the U.S. Court of Appeals for the D.C. Circuit affirmed the District Court's decision upholding the constitutionality of Section 4(b) and Section 5. After surveying the evidence in the Congressional Record associated with the 2006 reauthorization of Section 5, the appellate court accepted Congress's conclusion that Section 2 litigation remained inadequate in the covered jurisdictions to protect the rights of minority voters, that Section 5 was therefore still justified, and that the coverage formula continued to pass constitutional muster.

=== Supreme Court ===
The Supreme Court granted certiorari to hear the case on the limited question of "whether Congress' decision in 2006 to reauthorize Section 5 of the Voting Rights Act under the pre-existing coverage formula of Section 4(b) of the Voting Rights Act exceeded its authority under the Fourteenth and Fifteenth Amendments and thus violated the Tenth Amendment and Article IV of the United States Constitution." The Supreme Court heard oral arguments on February 27, 2013. Media coverage of the justices' comments during oral arguments portrayed the Court as appearing likely to hold Section 5 or Section 4(b) unconstitutional. Justice Antonin Scalia drew criticism from civil rights leaders for expressing his belief during oral argument that Congress reauthorized Section 5 not because the legislation was necessary, but because it constituted a "racial entitlement" that Congress was unlikely to end.

A coalition of four states provided an amicus brief to the Supreme Court expressing support for Section 5 and noting that the preclearance provision did not impose a burden on them. The coalition was led by New York and included Mississippi, North Carolina and California.

== Opinions ==
=== Majority ===
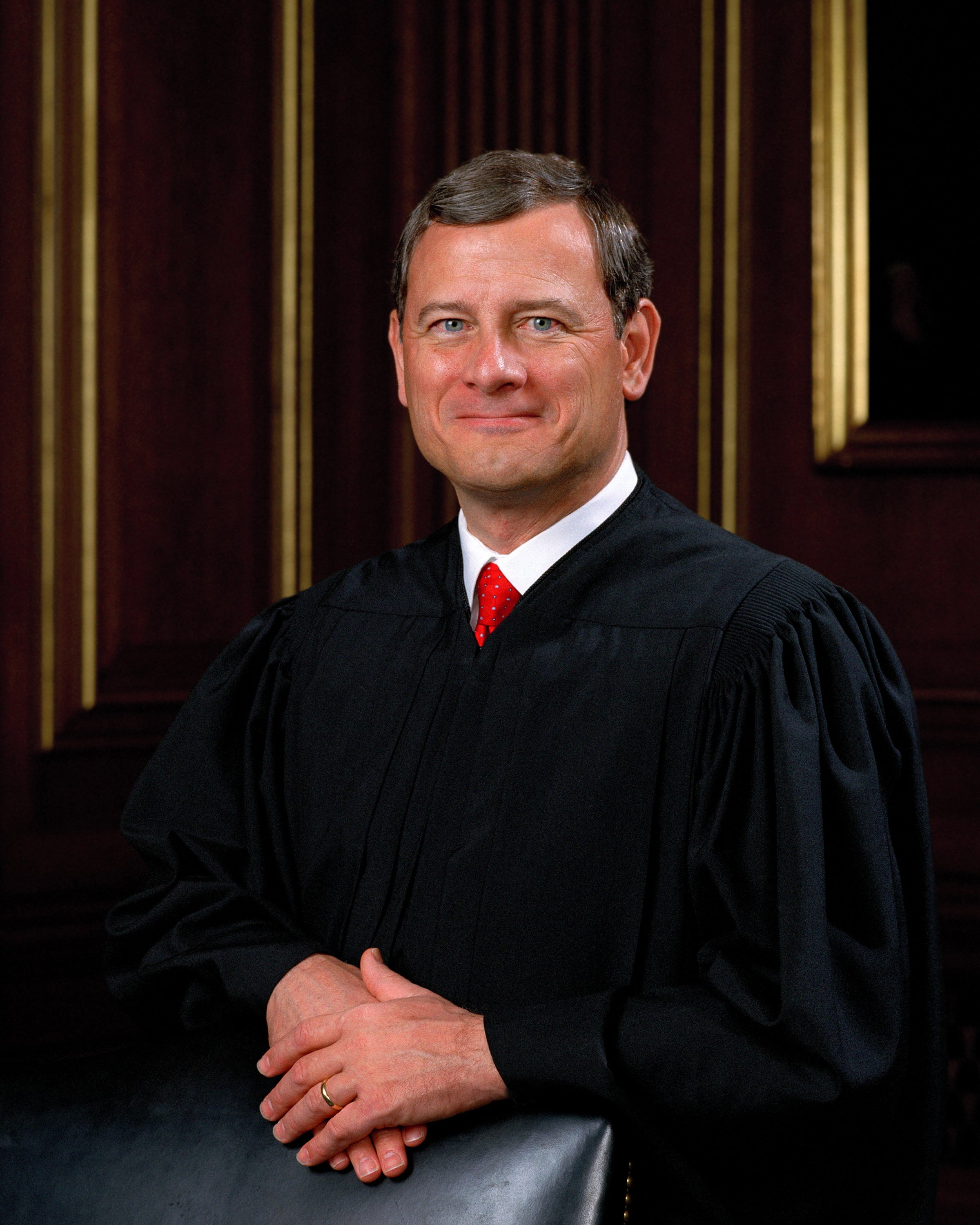
Chief Justice John Roberts

The Supreme Court struck down Section 4(b) as unconstitutional in a June 25, 2013 ruling. The majority opinion was delivered by Chief Justice John Roberts, joined by Justices Antonin Scalia, Anthony Kennedy, Clarence Thomas, and Samuel Alito. The Court held that Section 4(b) exceeded Congress' power to enforce the Fourteenth and Fifteenth Amendments, reasoning that the coverage formula conflicts with the constitutional principles of federalism and "equal sovereignty of the states" because the disparate treatment of the states is "based on 40-year-old facts having no logical relationship to the present day" and thus is not responsive to current needs. The Court held that Congress cannot subject a state to preclearance based simply on past discrimination. It noted that since the coverage formula was last modified in 1975, the country "has changed, and while any racial discrimination in voting is too much, Congress must ensure that the legislation it passes to remedy that problem speaks to current conditions". The Court declared that the Fifteenth Amendment "commands that the right to vote shall not be denied or abridged on account of race or color, and it gives Congress the power to enforce that command. The Amendment is not designed to punish for the past; its purpose is to ensure a better future."

Roberts wrote that the Act was immensely successful "at redressing racial discrimination and integrating the voting process" and noted that the U.S. has made great progress thanks to the Act. But he added: "If Congress had started from scratch in 2006, it plainly could not have enacted the present coverage formula." According to the Court, "Regardless of how to look at the record no one can fairly say that it shows anything approaching the 'pervasive,' 'flagrant,' 'widespread,' and 'rampant' discrimination that faced Congress in 1965, and that clearly distinguished the covered jurisdictions from the rest of the nation."

The Court did not subject Section 4(b) to the "congruence and proportionality" standard of review or address whether that standard is the appropriate measure to use when determining the constitutionality of legislation passed pursuant to Section 2 of the Fifteenth Amendment. The Court also noted the federalism concerns the Section 5 preclearance requirement raised, but did not reach the issue of whether Section 5 is constitutional. However, because the Section 5 preclearance requirement applies only to jurisdictions covered by the Section 4(b) coverage formula, the decision rendered Section 5 inoperable unless Congress enacts a new coverage formula.

=== Concurrence ===
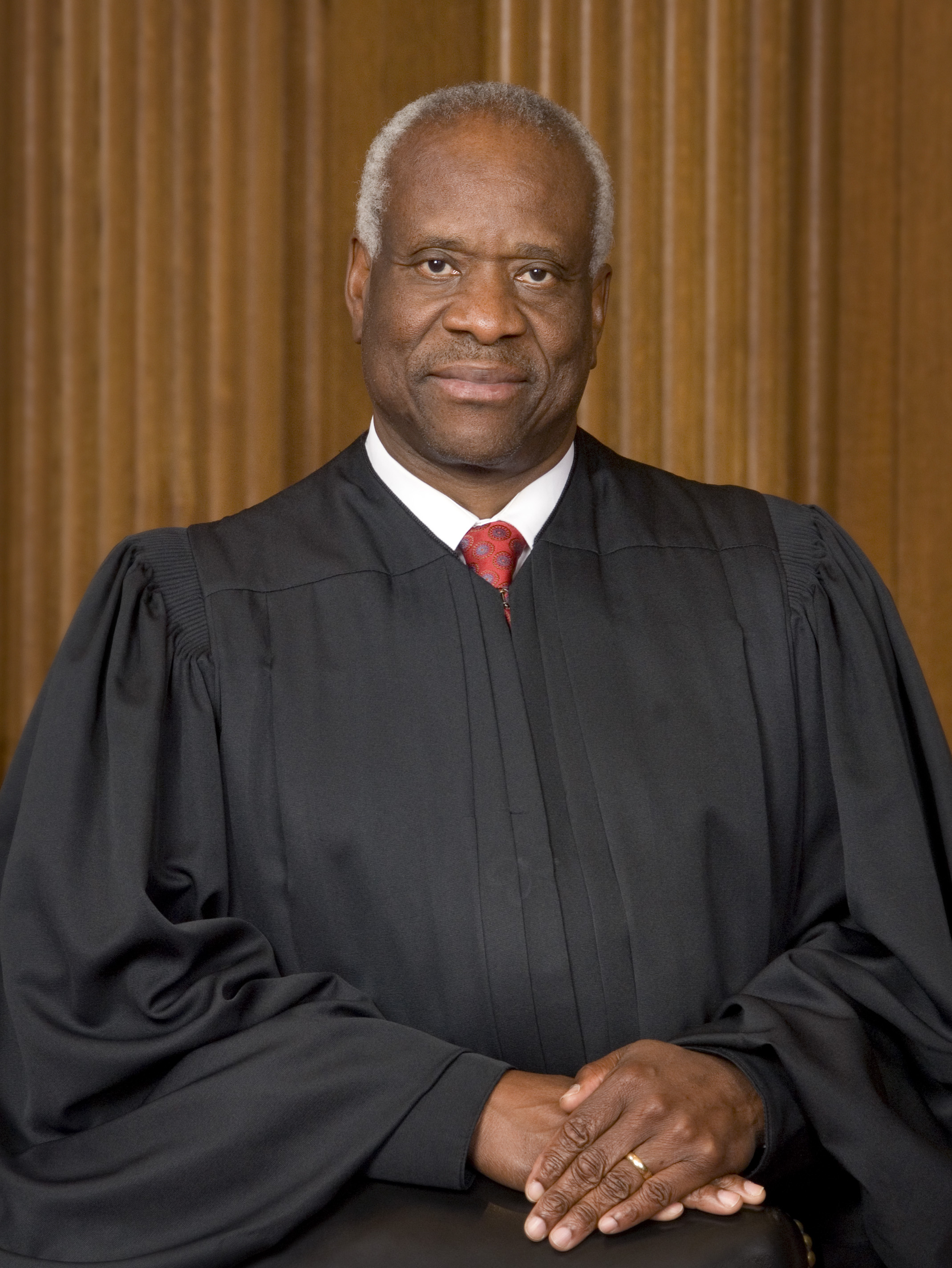
Justice Clarence Thomas

Thomas wrote a concurring opinion expressing his view that Section 5 is also unconstitutional for the same reasons the Court held Section 4(b) unconstitutional.

=== Dissent ===
Justice Ruth Bader Ginsburg wrote a dissenting opinion that was joined by Justices Stephen Breyer, Sonia Sotomayor, and Elena Kagan. The dissent would have held that Congress had sufficient evidence before it to determine that the coverage formula remained responsive to current needs. The dissent acknowledged that discrimination in voting has decreased in the covered jurisdictions since the Voting Rights Act's enactment, but it attributed much of that decrease to the Act itself, noting that "[t]hrowing out preclearance when it has worked and is continuing to work to stop discriminatory changes is like throwing away your umbrella in a rainstorm because you are not getting wet."

== Reaction ==
The opinion was controversial, prompting heavy media coverage of reactions from political leaders, activists, and the legal community.

=== Public officials ===
President Barack Obama expressed deep disappointment with the decision and called on Congress "to pass legislation to ensure every American has equal access to the polls". Attorney General Eric Holder also expressed disappointment, and pledged that the Department of Justice "will not hesitate to take swift enforcement action—using every legal tool that remains available to us—against any jurisdiction that seeks to take advantage of the Supreme Court's ruling by hindering eligible citizens' full and free exercise of the franchise". On July 25, 2013, Holder announced that the Department of Justice would ask a federal court to subject the formerly covered state of Texas to preclearance under the "bail in" provision in Section 3 of the Voting Rights Act, which was unaffected by the Court's decision.

When asked whether a polarized Congress could agree on a new coverage formula, Speaker John Boehner acknowledged the Voting Rights Act's importance over the previous 40 years and said he was reviewing the decision and trying to determine the next steps. House Majority Leader Eric Cantor expressed hope that Congress would "put politics aside" and determine how to ensure that voting rights remain protected.

Representative John Lewis, a leader in the civil rights movement who was present when President Lyndon B. Johnson signed the Voting Rights Act into law, said that the decision disregarded the country's history of voting discrimination and that he feared the decision would allow local election officials "to go back to another period". He added: "the purpose of the Voting Rights Act is not to increase the numbers of minority voters or elected officials. That is a byproduct of its effectiveness. The purpose of the act is to stop discriminatory practices from becoming law. There are more black elected officials in Mississippi today not because attempts to discriminate against voters ceased but because the Voting Rights Act kept those attempts from becoming law."

House Judiciary Committee chair Bob Goodlatte said the committee would review new voting data but that he was unsure whether it would take any action in response to the decision. On July 18, 2013, the House Judiciary Subcommittee on the Constitution and Civil Justice held a hearing to discuss how the House should respond to the ruling.

Senate Majority Leader Harry Reid said that Democrats were concerned with the ruling in light of "Republicans doing everything they could to suppress voting" in the 2012 elections, and that the Senate would act to address the decision. Senator Bob Corker said that he "cannot imagine" Congress ever agreeing on the terms of a new coverage formula. On July 17, 2013, the Senate Judiciary Committee began to hold hearings on how to respond to the decision.

Republican Senator Ted Cruz supported the ruling: "Today, the Supreme Court recognized the enormous progress made toward voting equality in the United States since the Voting Rights Act was passed in 1965. The Court rightly decided that the statutory standard used decades ago to subject democratically elected state legislatures to second-guessing by unelected federal bureaucrats no longer survives constitutional scrutiny."

At the state level, Texas and Mississippi officials pledged within hours of the decision to enforce voter ID laws that the attorney general had blocked while investigating their effect on voting. Florida Secretary of State Ken Detzner said it made no sense for five Florida counties to be subject to preclearance based on decades-old voting rights data and that the decision would save the state money. New York Governor Andrew Cuomo said the decision troubled him and called upon Congress to pass a new coverage formula.

=== Others ===
Edward Blum, director of the Project on Fair Representation, an Alexandria-based nonprofit legal defense foundation that provided counsel to Shelby County, commented that the Supreme Court restored "a fundamental constitutional order that America's laws must apply uniformly to each state and jurisdiction. All 50 states are entitled to equal dignity and sovereignty under the law." Ilya Shapiro of the Cato Institute said that the decision "restore[d] the constitutional order, the status quo ante the temporary Sections 4/5, because there is no longer systemic racial disenfranchisement, or at the very least in the covered jurisdictions".

By contrast, Jon Greenbaum, chief counsel of the Lawyers' Committee for Civil Rights Under Law, said that because of the decision, "[m]inority voters in places with a record of discrimination are now at greater risk of being disenfranchised than they have been in decades" and that their only recourse will be to pursue expensive litigation. Penda Hair, co-director of national racial justice organization Advancement Project, said, "The Supreme Court's ruling rolls back legislation that courageous Americans fought so hard for, even giving their lives in many cases, to ensure that all citizens can participate in our democracy. Today's decision threatens the promise of equal access to the ballot—especially when the majority of voters of color who voted last year, 65.8 percent, live in states covered by the Section 4 formula."

Former White House Counsel Gregory B. Craig was highly critical of the decision, calling it not only "an assault on Congress" but also "the single greatest example of legislating from the bench in my lifetime". He added: "This decision resurrects the discarded proposition that states’ rights are more important than individual rights and that federal efforts to protect citizens’ rights should defer to the sovereignty of the states. The struggle between states’ rights and individual rights—and the proper role of the federal government in that struggle— [...] has been deeply divisive and, on occasion, violent. [...] What was once a bipartisan consensus, achieved after many years of pain and struggle, is no longer. We can add voting rights to the list of polarizing issues that will divide Congress."

Richard H. Pildes, Professor at New York University School of Law, said that Sections 4 and 5 of the 1965 Voting Rights Act have limitations. He called for legislation protecting the right to vote in national and universal terms: "Such laws would be designed to eliminate unnecessary and unjustifiable barriers to political participation in general." He pointed to national laws enacted by Congress such as the Help America Vote Act and the National Voter Registration Act as examples that "might be the most effective way today to protect the rights of all voters, including minority voters."

An October 2017 ProPublica investigation analyzed the data Roberts used in the ruling. Roberts wrote that the registration gap between blacks and whites had shrunk dramatically in southern states since the Voting Rights Act of 1965, and questioned why six southern states were subject to stringent oversight. He included Hispanics as whites, including even those who could not register to vote because they were not U.S. citizens, thereby making the "white" registration rate lower than what it would otherwise have been.

Ian Millhiser of Vox argues the decision "appears completely divorced from the actual text of the Constitution and from the text of federal laws", as "the principle that all States enjoy equal sovereignty" that Roberts used in arguing against preclearance is not in the text of the Constitution.

== Impact ==
As reported by The New York Times, the United States has a long history of limiting access to voting. It began during the Founding Fathers' era and reached a peak during the Jim Crow era. The idea that disenfranchising legitimate voters was unethical gained momentum after the Civil rights movement and the passage of the Voting Rights Act in 1965, but came to a halt almost "two decades after the Bush v. Gore stalemate", which "led to voting rules being viewed as key elements of election strategy ... the issue is playing an extraordinary role in the midterm elections." In light of this, restrictions on registering and voting after Shelby County was decided were made in most cases by Republicans. According to many Republicans, such restrictions are necessary to combat election fraud. The New York Times observed in 2018 that the aforementioned restrictions on registering and voting "reflect rising partisanship, societal shifts producing a more diverse America, and the weakening of the Voting Rights Act by the Supreme Court in 2013."

Since the ruling, 15 states have passed laws that removed provisions such as online voting registration, early voting, "Souls to the Polls" Sunday voting, in which shuttle services take people to the polls directly after church, same-day registration, and pre-registering people under the age of 18 to vote.

The ruling has also resulted in some states implementing voter identification laws and becoming more aggressive in expunging allegedly ineligible voters from registration rolls. States that have changed their voting policies post-Shelby include both jurisdictions that were previously required to undergo federal preclearance and some that were not, including Alabama, Arizona, Arkansas, North Carolina, Ohio, Wisconsin and Texas. According to the Brennan Center for Justice, the states most likely to enact voting restrictions were states with the highest African-American turnout in the 2008 election. A 2020 study found that jurisdictions that had previously been covered by preclearance substantially increased their voter registration purges after Shelby. Virtually all voting restrictions after the ruling were enacted by Republicans.

Three years after the ruling, 868 U.S. polling places had closed. Five years after the ruling, nearly 1,000 polling places had closed, many of them in predominantly African-American counties. Research shows that changing and reducing voter locations can reduce voter turnout. A 2018 report by the U.S. Commission on Civil Rights (a bipartisan, independent commission of the United States federal government) found that there had been an increase in laws making it harder for minorities to vote. The commission found that at least 23 states enacted restrictive voter laws, such as closures of polling places, cuts to early voting, purges of voter rolls, and imposition of strict voter ID laws. The commission chair said people "continue to suffer significant and profoundly unequal, limitations on their ability to vote ... That stark reality denigrates our democracy and diminishes our ideals. This level of ongoing discrimination confirms what was true before 1965, when the Voting Rights Act became law and has remained true since 1965: Americans need strong and effective federal protections to guarantee that ours is a real democracy."

A 2017 study in the American Journal of Political Science by Boston University political scientist Sophie Schuit and Harvard University political scientist Jon C. Rogowski found that the Voting Rights Act's preclearance requirement led to greater representation of Black interests and that this effect persisted long after the Act's passage. Schuit and Rogowski note that this finding is contrary to the "majority's opinion in Shelby County v. Holder that 'things have changed' and that the issues addressed by the VRA are 'decades‐old problems'. To the contrary, preclearance under the VRA appeared to substantially increase Black representation in the contemporary era."

Journalist Vann R. Newkirk II asserted in July 2018 that in Shelby County v. Holder and the 2018 decisions Husted v. Randolph Institute and Abbott v. Perez, the Roberts Court has "set the stage for a new era of white hegemony", because these cases "furthered Roberts's mandate to distance the federal judiciary from Thurgood Marshall's vision of those bodies as active watchdogs for the Fourteenth and arbiters for America's racial injustices." According to Newkirk, with these three cases "the Court has established that not only are the legacies of Jim Crow no longer a valid justification for proactive restrictions on states, but the Court doesn't necessarily have a role in advancing the spirit of the franchise. Furthermore, with Alito's gerrymandering decision, the Court holds that past discrimination by states—even at its boldest and most naked—is not really a consideration in assessments of current policies. This part is crucial, because in an era where crafty state politicians have moved toward race-neutral language that clearly still seeks to disenfranchise people of color, a certain default suspicion by federal courts and the Department of Justice based on those state politicians' histories has been the main protective force for the minorities' voting rights. That suspicion is gone now, as are all vestiges of Marshall's intended vigilance. The full text of the Voting Rights Act may or may not be in danger depending on the nature of the challenges that arise for the next generation of justices, but the damage has already been done. If the act represented a commitment by the federal government to ensure the true fulfillment of the Fourteenth Amendment's right to due process and the Fifteenth Amendment's erasure of race-based disenfranchisement, then Roberts's Court has all but dismantled that commitment."

A 2019 American Economic Journal study found that preclearance substantially increased turnout among minorities, even as late as 2012. The study estimates that preclearance led to an increase in minority turnout of 17 percentage points. Civil rights and voting rights groups described to Vox in June 2019 the consequences they saw six years after the Shelby decision, including an increase in litigation with states, growing costs because of monitoring and pursuing litigation over voting restrictions and an increase in laws that created new requirements in the voting process and disproportionately affected minority groups. Voting restrictions and new requirements in the voting process include "strict photo ID requirements, limitations on who can provide assistance at polling places, the curbing of early voting days, and the closing of hundreds of polling places across the US. Other measures, like the purging of voters from state voter rolls and drawing election districts in a way that curbs the power of voters of color, have affected how much power communities of color hold in elections." Automatic voter registration as a prerequisite for voting was passed in 16 states and the District of Columbia as of June 2019. Under these voter registration systems two things happen: if eligible citizens interact with government agencies they are registered to vote or have their existing registration information updated (this is not compulsory; citizens can refuse to participate in the system) and instead of using paper registration forms, government agencies transfer voter registration information to election officials electronically. The Brennan Center for Justice argues that automatic voter registration does not only "increase registration rates, clean up the voter rolls, and save states money", but is also "a new way forward that can help to open access to the franchise and improve American democracy. Particularly at a time when many states have enacted restrictive voting laws and voter turnout has hit record lows".

Numerous strict voter ID laws have passed in states that required preclearance under the Civil Rights Act. Such laws were passed for the stated reason of preventing vote fraud, but there is no evidence of widespread voter fraud, and critics say these laws are intended to make it harder for minorities to vote. Research is mixed as to whether voter ID requirements suppress turnout, with many studies finding that they reduce minority participation, and others finding no impact. A 2020 study found that the jurisdictions that had previously been covered by preclearance substantially increased the rate of voter registration purges after the Shelby decision.

In a study published in March 2024, the Brennan Center for Justice found that the "racial turnout gap"—"the difference in the turnout rate between white and nonwhite voters"—had grown since 2012, particularly in states that had previously been covered by the Voting Rights Act's preclearance provision. The Brennan Center reported, "In 2020, if the gap had not existed, 9 million more ballots would have been cast—far more than the 7 million by which Joe Biden won the national popular vote. In 32 states, the number of 'uncast' ballots due to the turnout gap was larger than the winning presidential candidate's margin of votes."

=== Alabama ===
After Shelby, Alabama Republicans drew a new legislative apportionment map of the state that some, such as federal judge Myron Herbert Thompson, contended was illegal. Democrats said that the new map packs African-American voters into too few voting districts and is an effort to hamper the power of the largely Democratic voting base.

In 2014, the Supreme Court said it would hear appeals from the Alabama Legislative Black Caucus regarding the redistricting.

=== Arizona ===
In an opinion issued by Arizona's attorney general in 2013, Arizona residents who registered to vote using forms provided by the federal government must also provide documentation proving their citizenship, or their registration will be labeled invalid. Attorney General Tom Horne said those who registered using federal registration could vote in federal elections, but not state and local elections without showing proof of citizenship. The attorney general also held that these same registrants will not be able to sign petitions for candidates or ballot initiatives.

=== North Carolina ===
Shortly after the Shelby ruling, North Carolina Governor Pat McCrory signed into law H.B. 589, which terminated valid out-of-precinct voting, same-day registration during the early voting period, and pre-registration for those about to turn 18, while also enacting a voter ID law. Opponents criticized the law as adversely affecting minority voters.

The law was challenged on behalf of the North Carolina State Conference of the NAACP in a suit filed by Advancement Project, pro bono counsel Kirkland & Ellis, and North Carolina attorneys Adam Stein and Irv Joyner. The suit alleged that the law violates Section 2 of the Voting Rights Act and the 14th and 15th Amendments of the U.S. Constitution.

On July 29, 2016, a three-judge panel of the Fourth Circuit Court of Appeals reversed a trial court decision in a number of consolidated actions, finding that the new voting provisions targeted African Americans "with almost surgical precision" and that the legislators had acted with "discriminatory intent" in enacting strict election rules; the Court struck down the law's photo ID requirement and changes to early voting, preregistration, same-day registration, and out-of-district voting.

=== North Dakota ===
On October 10, 2018, the United States Court of Appeals for the Eighth Circuit upheld an act of North Dakota that requires voters to have an ID with their name, street address, and date of birth. At the time the state's Native reservations did not generally have street addresses, only post boxes for residents; there was concern that this provision would disproportionately affect Native voting and speculation that it was drafted with that as a primary goal.

Dissenting Justices Ginsburg and Kagan wrote, "The risk of voter confusion appears severe here because the injunction against requiring residential-address identification was in force during the primary election and because the Secretary of State's website announced for months the ID requirements as they existed under that injunction."

=== Ohio ===
In February 2014, the Ohio House approved a bill that eliminated the so-called "Golden Week" during which Ohio voters could register and vote on the same day. The bill also cut six days from Ohio's early voting period. In a separate bill, the House made it easier for registrars to reject absentee ballots for missing information. This bill ends a program that mailed absentee ballot applications to all registered voters. Under the new law, Ohio's secretary of state would have to get lawmaker approval to mail these absentee ballot applications.

=== Texas ===
While its voter ID law was passed in 2011, Texas did not enact the law until 2013 after the Shelby ruling, when the state was no longer subject to federal preclearance for changes to its voting laws. Under the law, Texas voters must show a photo ID to vote. While there are some exemptions, such as for voters with disabilities, most are required to produce a Texas driver's license or state ID card. Other forms of acceptable ID include concealed handgun licenses, military ID, U.S. citizenship papers with photo, and a U.S. passport.

If the voter does not possess one of the forms of acceptable photo ID and cannot reasonably obtain one, the voter may present one of the following, after which they must execute a Reasonable Impediment Declaration: a copy or original of a government document that shows the voter's name and an address, including the voter's voter registration certificate; a current utility bill; a bank statement; a government check; a paycheck; or (a) a certified domestic (from a U.S. state or territory) birth certificate or (b) a document confirming birth admissible in a court of law that establishes the voter's identity (which may be a foreign birth document).

Examples of problems under the new law involved public figures: Texas judge Sandra Watts was unable to vote because the name on her photo ID did not match the name on the voter rolls. State Senator Wendy Davis and then-Attorney General Greg Abbott were delayed in voting under the new law. They were all able to vote after signing affidavits attesting that they were who they claimed to be.

=== Wisconsin ===
In 2014, the American Civil Liberties Union and the Advancement Project filed a petition asking the Supreme Court to block Wisconsin's voter ID law, charging the measure would disproportionately affect voters of color. Challenging the law under Section 2 of the Voting Rights Act and the U.S. Constitution, Advancement Project litigated on behalf of the League of United Latin American Citizens of Wisconsin, Cross Lutheran Church, Wisconsin League of Young Voters Education Fund, and the Milwaukee Area Labor Council of the AFL-CIO. Advancement Project claimed that Wisconsin's voter ID law, enacted in 2012, is "part of a broader attack on the right to vote". On October 9, 2014, the U.S. Supreme Court issued an emergency stay in this case, blocking a Seventh Circuit Court of Appeals order to implement Wisconsin's voter ID law and enabling registration under previous rules for the fall of 2014 elections. In March 2015, the Supreme Court declined to take up the case, allowing the law to go into effect.

== Legislative responses ==
On January 16, 2014, a bipartisan group of members of Congress, consisting of Representatives Jim Sensenbrenner and John Conyers and Senator Patrick Leahy, introduced H.R.3899/S.1945, the Voting Rights Amendment Act of 2014. The bill was introduced to strengthen the Voting Rights Act of 1965 (VRA) and vital protections of it after Shelby County v. Holder. The proposed Voting Rights Amendment Act of 2014 consists of five components:

1. Based on empirical conditions and current data there is a new coverage formula for Section 4 based on a rolling calendar, updated with a current fifteen-year time period to exempt states who are no longer discriminating or add new ones who are. The last part is designed to create a deterrent against future voting rights violations. Under the new formula states with five violations of federal law to their voting changes over the past fifteen years will have to submit future election changes for federal approval. Local jurisdictions would be covered if they commit three or more violations or have one violation and "persistent, extremely low minority turnout" over the past fifteen years. While Voter ID laws can still be blocked by the Department of Justice in the new states covered under Section 4, objections to voter ID laws by the department will not count as a new violation.
2. Section 3 of the bill makes it possible that a court may order jurisdictions not covered by Section 4 to have future changes to its election laws preapproved by the federal government after plaintiffs file a corresponding application with the court. Plaintiffs have to show evidence of intentional voting discrimination to enable such a bail-in. Any violation of the VRA or of federal voting rights law—whether intentional or not—can be under the new section 3 proposal grounds for a bail-in, but court objections to voter ID laws that are not found to be intentionally discriminatory cannot be used as grounds for "bail-in" under Section 3.
3. Jurisdictions in all U.S. states have to provide notice in the local media and online of any election procedures related to redistricting, changes within 180 days of a federal election, and the moving of a polling place. Citizens can thus easier identify potentially harmful voting changes in states not subject to Sections 4 and 5 of the VRA.
4. Plaintiffs seeking a preliminary injunction against a potentially discriminatory voting law must only show that the hardship to them outweighs the hardship to the state if a law is blocked in court pending a full trial.
5. Affirming the attorney general's authority to send federal observers in states subject to Section 4 to monitor elections in these states the proposal expands the attorney general's authority to send observers to jurisdictions with a history of discriminating against language minority groups.

As of June 2014 the Voting Rights Amendment Act of 2014 was in limbo because there was no widespread support for amending the Voting Rights Act as it was by its reauthorization in 2006. The House and Senate versions of the bill died in their respective Judiciary Committees. The House introduced the Voting Rights Amendment Act of 2015 the next year. It was referred to the House Judiciary Committee on the day it was introduced, but did not move past the committee stage. The Voting Rights Advancement Act of 2015 (H.R. 2867), a similar measure to the Voting Rights Amendment Act of 2015, was introduced on June 24, 2015, but died with the end of the 114th United States Congress. The most recent legislative attempt, the Voting Rights Amendment Act of 2017 (H.R. 3239), was introduced on July 13, 2017, and again referred to the House Judiciary Committee.

New York Senator Kirsten Gillibrand proposed to make online voter registration universal. Under her proposal, states with existing online access would expand their system beyond those with state-issued IDs to allow more young people, seniors, minorities, and the poor access and update their own voter records online. To ensure security, online systems will verify voter's eligibility by checking each person's personal information, like date of birth, Social Security, and address. According to the Brennan Center for Justice at New York University Law School in 2014 several states (California, Colorado, Hawaii, Illinois, Louisiana, Massachusetts, Minnesota, Mississippi, Nebraska, Oklahoma, South Carolina, Utah) and Washington, D.C. passed laws improving voter access, while laws restricting voter access were only passed by a minority of states in 2014. Introduced and pending legislation to expand and improve access to registration and voting include, as of December 2014, electronic transfer of voter registration information, online registration; portability, i.e. the possibility to move a voter's registration with her when she moves to a new address within the same county or state); fail-safe protections; easier registration and voting for students, people with disabilities, military members, and voters who speak a language other than English; and expansion of opportunities for voting registration and for early in-person voting.

According to congressional Democrats, Shelby County v. Holder gave states more leeway to pass even more restrictive voting laws. In February 2019, congressional Democrats therefore introduced the Voting Rights Advancement Act of 2019 (H.R. 4 in the 116th Congress), which would restore the Voting Rights Act's preclearance provision, requiring certain jurisdictions to secure federal approval before enacting voting changes. Alabama, California, Florida, Georgia, Louisiana, Mississippi, New York, North Carolina, South Carolina, Texas, and Virginia were predicted to be covered by the act. Since 2013, 19 states have implemented restrictive voter identification laws, closed polling places, and shortened early voting periods, according to U.S. Representative Terri Sewell. U.S. Senator Patrick Leahy added:

In the wake of Shelby County—which gutted Section 5 of the Voting Right Acts and consequently crippled the federal government's ability to prevent discriminatory changes to state voting laws—states have unleashed this torrent of voter suppression schemes. Because of a single, misguided, 5 to 4 decision, the federal government can no longer effectively serve as a shield against disenfranchisement operations targeting minorities and the disadvantaged across the country. The proliferation of threats to the right to vote in the wake of Shelby County makes it unmistakably clear why we need the full protections of the Voting Rights Act. That is why I am introducing the Voting Rights Advancement Act of 2019 to restore Section 5 of the Voting Rights Act, improve and modernize that landmark legislation, and provide the federal government with other critical tools to combat this full-fledged assault on the franchise.

Senator Mitch McConnell later called the proposed bill "the Democrat Politician Protection Act".

Automatic voter registration as a prerequisite for voting was approved in 16 states and the District of Columbia as of June 2019. The Brennan Center for Justice argues automatic voter registration would not only "increase registration rates, clean up the voter rolls, and save states money", but is also "a new way forward that can help to open access to the franchise and improve American democracy. Particularly at a time when many states have enacted restrictive voting laws and voter turnout has hit record lows".

In 2021, during the 117th Congress, the bill was renamed the John Lewis Voting Rights Act, in honor of the Congressman after his death on July 17, 2020. Despite several attempts that have included passage in the House of Representatives, the bill has never been passed and signed into law.

== See also ==
- Abbott v. Perez (2018), a case dealing with Section 2 of the Voting Rights Act of 1965, a core section of the Act in redistricting
- Brnovich v. Democratic National Committee (2021), a case dealing with Section 2 in voting laws passed after Shelby's elimination of preclearance requirements
- Louisiana v. Callais (2026), a landmark Supreme Court case that heavily limited the use of Section 2 of the Voting Rights Act
- Help America Vote Act (HAVA)
- National Voter Registration Act of 1993 (NVRA)
- Uniformed and Overseas Citizens Absentee Voting Act (UOCAVA)
- Voter suppression in the United States
