= Husted v. Randolph Institute =

- Supreme Court of the United States

Argued January 10, 2018 Decided June 11, 2018
- Full case name: Jon A. Husted et al. v. A. Philip Randolph Institute et al.
- Docket no.: 16-980
- Citations: 584 U.S. ___ (more) 138 S. Ct. 1833; 201 L. Ed. 2d 141

Case history
- Prior: A. Philip Randolph Inst. v. Husted, 838 F.3d 699 (6th Cir. 2016); cert. granted, 137 S. Ct. 2188 (2017).

Holding
- Both the National Voter Registration Act of 1993 and the Help America Vote Act of 2002, as prescribed by law in 52 U.S.C. § 20507, permit Ohio to have a list-maintenance process that removes people from the state's on the basis of inactivity.

Court membership
- Chief Justice John Roberts Associate Justices Anthony Kennedy · Clarence Thomas; Ruth Bader Ginsburg · Stephen Breyer; Samuel Alito · Sonia Sotomayor; Elena Kagan · Neil Gorsuch

Case opinions
- Majority: Alito, joined by Roberts, Kennedy, Thomas, Gorsuch
- Concurrence: Thomas
- Dissent: Breyer, joined by Ginsburg, Sotomayor, Kagan
- Dissent: Sotomayor

Laws applied
- 52 U.S.C. § 20507

Husted v. A. Philip Randolph Institute, No. 16-980, 584 U.S. ___ (2018), was a case before the Supreme Court of the United States regarding Ohio's voter registration laws. At issue was whether federal law, 52 U.S.C. § 20507, permits Ohio's list-maintenance process, which uses a registered voter's voter inactivity as a reason to send a confirmation notice to that voter under the National Voter Registration Act of 1993 and the Help America Vote Act of 2002. If the mail is not returned, the voter is stricken from the rolls, a practice called voter caging. The Court ruled in a 5–4 decision that Ohio's law did not violate federal laws.

== Background ==
Ohio law provides a process to remove an inactive voter from its list of registered voters. After a two-year break from certain voting activities specified by Ohio law (i.e., filing a change of address, filing a registration to vote, casting an absentee ballot, casting a provisional ballot, or voting on election day), the State sends these inactive voters a confirmation notice via mail. If the voter does not respond to that notice, re-register, or vote over the next four years, the voter is removed from the list of registered voters. A similar approach is used in eighteen other states to trim voter registration lists, though Ohio's approach holds a strong reliance on the two-year non-voting break to trigger the process, faster than most other states. In 2016, an estimated 144,000 people were removed from Ohio's voter registration list in the three largest counties in the state, containing the cities Cleveland, Columbus, and Cincinnati.

The case originated from Larry Harmon, a resident of the state who had previously voted in the 2008 elections, but did not vote in either the 2012 main election or the 2010 and 2014 mid-term elections. Desiring to vote on an issue in 2015, Harmon found that his name had been struck from the voter lists, following Ohio's process, but he claims he never received the postal notice. The A. Philip Randolph Institute, a labor and civil rights group, originally filed this lawsuit for Mr. Harmon against Ohio’s Secretary of State, Jon A. Husted, alleging that this process violated the National Voter Registration Act of 1993, which bars states from removing someone from the voter registration list for not voting and sets out a process for states to remove voters who have moved away. The state prevailed in federal district court. The United States Court of Appeals for the Sixth Circuit reversed. It concluded that, although federal law allows Ohio to remove voters who did not either respond to the confirmation notice or vote in two elections, the state’s process uses the failure to vote as the basis for initiating removal, which is not authorized by federal law.

== Supreme Court ==
On May 30, 2017, the Supreme Court agreed to hear the case later that year. The Court was scheduled to hear oral arguments November 8, 2017, however the Court temporarily removed the case from its argument calendar due to one of the parties' attorneys being ill. The case was argued on January 10, 2018 by attorney Paul M. Smith, Ohio Solicitor General Eric E. Murphy, and Solicitor General of the United States Noel Francisco.

=== Opinion of the Court ===
The Court announced judgment in favor of the state on June 10, 2018, reversing the Sixth Circuit by a vote of 5–4. Writing for the majority, Justice Samuel Alito, joined by Chief Justice John Roberts and Justices Anthony Kennedy, Clarence Thomas, and Neil Gorsuch found that the process Ohio used follows the specifications of both the National Voter Registration Act and the Help America Vote Act. Under Section 8(d), 52 U.S.C. § 20507(d), a registration is subject to removal from the official list of eligible voters on grounds of a change of residence if:

- (a) The registrant fails to respond to a notice (a "Section 8(d)(2) Notice") that includes a postage prepaid and preaddressed return card sent by forwardable mail, on which the registrant may state his or her current address, and which contains specific instructions and information consistent with the language set forth in 52 U.S.C. § 20507(d)(2), and
- (b) The registrant then fails to vote or appear to vote or to correct the Registrar's record during the period ending on the day after the second federal general election subsequent to the Section 8(d)(2) notice being sent. 52 U.S.C. § 20507(d)(l)(B).

With respect to the aforementioned described section the United States Supreme Court stated in Husted v. A. Philip Randolph Inst., 138 S. Ct. 1833 (2018) that Section 8(d) "provides that a State may remove a registrant who "(i) has failed to respond to a notice" and "(ii) has not voted or appeared to vote ... during the period beginning on the date of the notice and ending on the day after the date of the second general election for Federal office that occurs after the date of the notice" (about four years). 52 U. S. C. §20507(d)(l)(B). Not only are States allowed to remove registrants who satisfy these requirements, but federal law makes this removal mandatory. Id. at 1841-42 (emphasis added), citing 52 U.S.C. § 20507(d)(3); 52 U.S.C. § 21083(a)(4)(A)."

Alito wrote that in interpreting Congress's intention of the Failure-to-Vote clause, amended by the Help America Vote act and a point of contention raised by the respondents, was not in claimed conflict with previous language from the National Voter Registration Act. Alito wrote that Ohio's law "does not strike any registrant solely by reason of the failure to vote" and "[i]nstead, as expressly permitted by federal law, it removes registrants only when they have failed to vote and have failed to respond to a change-of-residence notice".

=== Dissent ===
Justice Stephen Breyer wrote a dissenting opinion, joined by Justices Ruth Bader Ginsburg, Sonia Sotomayor, and Elena Kagan, argued against Alito's reading of Congress's intent with the two laws, and believed that Ohio's approach did violate this intent. Breyer wrote that this process presumes action on the absence of a response, since only few of those that are mailed voter cards reply back to them. Sotomayor opined in a separate dissent that Ohio's voter-list purging puts too much of an onus on registered voters, and weights against minority, low-income, disabled and veteran voters.

== Subsequent developments and criticism ==
The decision, issued in June, allows Ohio to continue pruning its voter list prior to the 2018 election cycle, as well as supporting similar approaches used in six other states. This approach made it harder for thousands of people to vote, especially minority and poor citizens as well as disabled voters and veterans, and it has been criticized by analysts because it has a greater effect on minorities or others that would normally vote as a Democrat, thus giving Republicans an edge in this upcoming election. Several other states have indicated that they would likely adopt similar language as Ohio's should the Court find in favor of the state.

Journalist Vann R. Newkirk II asserted in July 2018 that the Roberts Court with its Shelby County v. Holder decision along with the 2018 Supreme Court decisions in Husted v. Randolph Institute and Abbott v. Perez has "set the stage for a new era of white hegemony", because these cases "furthered Roberts's mandate to distance the federal judiciary from Thurgood Marshall's vision of those bodies as active watchdogs for the Fourteenth and arbiters for America's racial injustices." With the three cases together "the Court has established that not only are the legacies of Jim Crow no longer a valid justification for proactive restrictions on states, but the Court doesn't necessarily have a role in advancing the spirit of the franchise. Furthermore, with Alito's gerrymandering decision, the Court holds that past discrimination by states—even at its boldest and most naked—is not really a consideration in assessments of current policies. This part is crucial, because in an era where crafty state politicians have moved toward race-neutral language that clearly still seeks to disenfranchise people of color, a certain default suspicion by federal courts and the Department of Justice based on those state politicians' histories has been the main protective force for the minorities' voting rights. That suspicion is gone now, as are all vestiges of Marshall's intended vigilance."

== See also ==
- Shelby County v. Holder (2013) A case dealing with Section 5 of the Voting Rights Act of 1965, a core section of the Act
- Abbott v. Perez (2018) A case dealing with Section 2 of the Voting Rights Act of 1965, a core section of the Act
- Tenth Amendment
- Voter suppression in the United States
