= Abbott v. Perez =

- Supreme Court of the United States

Argued April 24, 2018 Decided June 25, 2018
- Full case name: Greg Abbott, Governor of Texas, et al. v. Shannon Perez, et al.
- Docket nos.: 17-586; 17-626
- Citations: 585 U.S. 579 (more) 138 S. Ct. 2305; 201 L. Ed. 2d 714; 2018 U.S. LEXIS 3846; 2018 WL 3096311
- Argument: Oral argument
- Opinion announcement: Opinion announcement

Case history
- Prior: Perez v. Abbott, 267 F. Supp. 3d 750 (W.D. Tex. 2017); 274 F. Supp. 3d 624 (W.D. Tex. 2017)

Holding
- The Texas court erred in requiring the State to show that the 2013 Legislature purged the "taint" that the court attributed to the defunct and never-used plans enacted by a prior legislature in 2011.

Court membership
- Chief Justice John Roberts Associate Justices Anthony Kennedy · Clarence Thomas; Ruth Bader Ginsburg · Stephen Breyer; Samuel Alito · Sonia Sotomayor; Elena Kagan · Neil Gorsuch

Case opinions
- Majority: Alito, joined by Roberts, Kennedy, Thomas, Gorsuch
- Concurrence: Thomas, joined by Gorsuch
- Dissent: Sotomayor, joined by Ginsburg, Breyer, Kagan

Abbott v. Perez, 585 U.S. 579 (2018), was a United States Supreme Court case dealing with the redistricting of the state of Texas following the 2010 census. The court held that the Texas court erred in requiring the state to show that the 2013 Legislature purged the "taint" that the court attributed to the defunct and never-used plans enacted by a prior legislature in 2011.

== Background ==
As a result of the 2010 United States census, the state of Texas was found to have gained more than four million new residents, many of them of Latino or African-American heritage. This granted Texas four additional seats in the United States House of Representatives, requiring the state to redraw both its congressional and legislative districts to incorporate these four new seats.

The Texas state government was controlled by the Republican Party at the time. Initial redistricting maps were completed by the state legislature by 2011, and sent to the United States District Court for the District of Columbia for "preclearance" as required by Section 5 of the Voting Rights Act of 1965 (VRA).

While the District Court reviewed the maps, some Texas citizens believed the redistricting diluted minority votes and used unconstitutional racial gerrymandering to define the new districts, violating both Section 2 of the VRA, and filed a separate suit in the United States District Court for the Western District of Texas. The Texas federal district court heard arguments in this case, but held off ruling until the preclearance was completed. However, with the 2012 elections nearing, the District of Columbia federal district court recognized it would not be able to complete the preclearance in time. The Texas federal district court, using proposals from parties in the current Section 2 case, developed the three interim district plans for the state's congressional and legislative districts by November 2011.

The state, defending its maps, issued an emergency request to the United States Supreme Court to reject the District Court maps. The Supreme Court agreed to the emergency request, and on January 20, 2012, vacated the maps developed by the Texas federal district court and instructed it to draw up new maps. The Texas federal district court used the state-derived maps as a starting point and issued their new maps by February 2012. Separately, the D.C. federal district court continued the evaluation of the redistricting maps, and ruled that all three redistricting maps provided by the state for preclearance did not meet the requirements for Section 5 of the VRA by August 2012. The judges determined that the state had not been able to prove that the redistricting plan was developed without intentional discrimination. Due to timing with the 2012 elections to be held in November, Texas continued to use the Texas federal district court-derived maps.

During these events, the Supreme Court ruled in Shelby County v. Holder that the statutory definition deciding which states were required to obtain preclearance was unconstitutional, eliminating the need for Texas to seek preclearance of their maps. The state, with only minor changes, adopted all three maps from the Texas federal district court as the permanent maps in June 2013.

The original suit in the Texas federal district court continued, with petitioners seeking to also amend the 2013 redistricting maps as part of their complaints, as to prevent these maps to be used in the next set of elections. This case became protracted in the District Court, but ultimately the court issued its ruling in August 2017. It ruled that the 2011 redistricting map violated either the VRA or the Constitution or a combination of both, and because the state used the maps proposed by Texas federal district court based on the original state maps following the U.S. Supreme Court ruling as the basis for the 2013 redistricting, that these were also similarly flawed. The court ordered the Texas governor to call a special meeting of legislators to redraw the maps in a timely manner, but the state instead turned to the U.S. Supreme Court to appeal the opinion, as well as to freeze the Texas federal district court's order to redraw the maps due to nearness of the 2018 elections. In a 5–4 decision split between the conservative and liberal justices, the U.S. Supreme Court agreed in September 2017 to freeze the redistricting order, and hear the case in January 2018.

== Supreme Court ==
The case presented at the U.S. Supreme Court combined two separate rulings issued by the Texas federal district court on the redistricting maps. The state in their petition asked on several issues, including whether the 2013 maps, adopted from those presented by the Texas District Court, could be considered unconstitutional, whether the Texas federal district court had ruled appropriately in challenging specific district lines identified in the 2013 maps, and whether the Texas federal district court had authority to demand the rapid redistricting session. The Court itself further considered if they had jurisdiction on the case, given that their action to freeze the Texas federal district court's ruling could have been seen as premature. Oral arguments were heard on April 24, 2018, with observers stating that the judges appeared to be split along conservative and liberal lines. Allison Riggs argued the case for the plaintiffs (Perez, et al.).

The decision was issued on June 25, 2018.

=== Opinion of the Court ===
In a 5–4 decision written by Justice Samuel Alito, the Court upheld the current redistricting maps as valid districts, outside of one district, Texas House District 90 near Fort Worth, which the court found was an "impermissible racial gerrymander", remanding the case to lower courts to correct the redistricting to eliminate the racial gerrymandering.

The court majority stated that state legislatures are entitled to a presumption of legislative good faith, especially in districting cases. Quoting Reno v. Bossier Parish School Bd., Alito notes that, "Whenever a challenger claims that a state law was enacted with discriminatory intent, the burden of proof lies with the challenger, not the State." The allocation of the burden of proof does not shift due to an "original sin" approach towards past discrimination. Alito says that the question is still always, "...whether a discriminatory intent has been proved in a given case," and while historical records of discrimination can be one evidentiary source for proving intent, its existence does not flip the burden of proof nor prove dispositive alone.

=== Concurrence and Dissent ===
Justice Clarence Thomas, joined by Neil Gorsuch, filed a concurrence asserting that redistricting is not covered by the Voting Rights Act. On behalf of the court's four liberals, Justice Sonia Sotomayor criticized the conservative majority. The majority's "disregard for both precedent and fact comes at serious costs to our democracy," she wrote in 46-page dissent. "It means that after years of litigation and undeniable proof of intentional discrimination, minority voters in Texas ... will continue to be underrepresented in the political process." Justice Sotomayor also accused the court of running interference for racists by "blind[ing] itself to the overwhelming factual record" to let Texas use maps that, "in design and effect, burden the rights of minority voters." Justice Alito, Justice Sotomayor wrote, is "just flat wrong," relying on "a selective reading" of the facts to ignore clear evidence of "racial discrimination."

== Impact and criticism ==
The Voting Rights Acts of 1965 contains a section known as Section 2. Section 2 encompasses two separate parts which are designed to protect against voting discrimination. Election laws enacted with racially discriminatory intent are prohibited by the first part. The second part is a prohibition of any voting procedure that "results in a denial or abridgement of the right of any citizen of the United States to vote on account of race or color." These two prongs of Section 2 are known as the "intent" test and the "results" test. The Supreme Court's holding in City of Mobile v. Bolden (1980) made it nearly impossible to win Section 2 suits, because plaintiffs must prove that the lawmakers who passed voting-related laws acted with "racially discriminatory motivation." Congress overrode the Mobile decision with the aforementioned second Section 2 prohibition. This made suits easier for plaintiffs, because they no longer needed to prove racist intent. Plaintiffs must only show that the voting-related law had a disparate negative effect on voters of color.

Vox journalist Ian Millhiser stated in several articles that the Abbott decision, under which courts must apply a strong presumption that lawmakers did not act with racist intent, makes Section 2 suits more difficult because "lawmakers enjoy such a strong presumption of racial innocence that it is now extremely difficult to prove that those lawmakers acted with racist intent — so difficult that it may be impossible except in the most egregious cases." He compared an argument made by Justice Alito in the Abbott decision with resistance by Southern States to the 1954 Supreme Court ruling in Brown v. Board of Education: "Alito's argument, in other words, is that the 2013 maps weren't enacted to preserve a racial gerrymander; they were enacted to shut down litigation challenging a racial gerrymander. And this distinction is sufficient to cleanse the state legislature of any allegation of racism. It's as if the school districts on the losing end of Brown v Board of Education (1954) had passed a new law recreating the same racially segregated schools that were challenged in the Brown litigation, but claimed that these segregated schools should be upheld because the new law had a legitimate purpose — to bring the litigation challenging public school segregation to an end as expeditiously as possible."

Journalist Vann R. Newkirk II asserted in July 2018 that the Roberts Court with its Shelby County v. Holder decision along with the 2018 Supreme Court decisions in Husted v. Randolph Institute and Abbott v. Perez has "set the stage for a new era of white hegemony", because these cases "furthered Roberts's mandate to distance the federal judiciary from Thurgood Marshall's vision of those bodies as active watchdogs for the Fourteenth and arbiters for America's racial injustices." With the three cases together "the Court has established that not only are the legacies of Jim Crow no longer a valid justification for proactive restrictions on states, but the Court doesn't necessarily have a role in advancing the spirit of the franchise. Furthermore, with Alito's gerrymandering decision, the Court holds that past discrimination by states—even at its boldest and most naked—is not really a consideration in assessments of current policies. This part is crucial, because in an era where crafty state politicians have moved toward race-neutral language that clearly still seeks to disenfranchise people of color, a certain default suspicion by federal courts and the Department of Justice based on those state politicians' histories has been the main protective force for the minorities' voting rights. That suspicion is gone now, as are all vestiges of Marshall's intended vigilance."

== See also ==
- Shelby County v. Holder (2013), A case dealing with Section 5 of the Voting Rights Act of 1965, a core section of the Act
- Louisiana v. Callais (2026), a landmark supreme court case that severely limited implementation of Section 2 of the Voting Rights Act in redistricting.
- Voter suppression in the United States
