= National Voter Registration Act of 1993 =

United States federal law

- Long title: An Act to establish national voter registration procedures for Federal elections, and for other purposes.
- Acronyms (colloquial): NVRA
- Nicknames: National Voter Registration Act, Motor Voter
- Enacted by: the 103rd United States Congress
- Effective: January 1, 1995

Citations
- Public law: 103-31
- Statutes at Large: 107 Stat. 77

Codification
- Titles amended: Title 52—Voting and Elections (Note: The law was initially codified under Title 42 before being transferred to Title 52.)
- U.S.C. sections created: 52 U.S.C. §§ 20501–20511 (Note: The law was initially codified under sections 42 U.S.C. ch. 20, subch. I-H § 1973gg et seq. before being transferred to its current location.)

Legislative history
- Introduced in the House as H.R. 2 by Al Swift (D–WA) on January 5, 1993; Committee consideration by House Administration; Passed the House on February 4, 1993 (259–160); Passed the Senate on March 17, 1993 (62–37); Reported by the joint conference committee on April 28, 1993; agreed to by the House on May 5, 1993 (259–164) and by the Senate on May 11, 1993 (62–36); Signed into law by President Bill Clinton on May 20, 1993

United States Supreme Court cases
- Young v. Fordice, 520 U.S. 273 (1997); Crawford v. Marion County Election Board, 553 U.S. 181 (2008); Arizona v. Inter Tribal Council of Arizona, Inc., 570 U.S. 1 (2013); Husted v. Randolph Institute, 584 U.S. 756 (2018); Republican National Committee v. Mi Familia Vota, No. 25-1017, ___ U.S. ___ (2027)

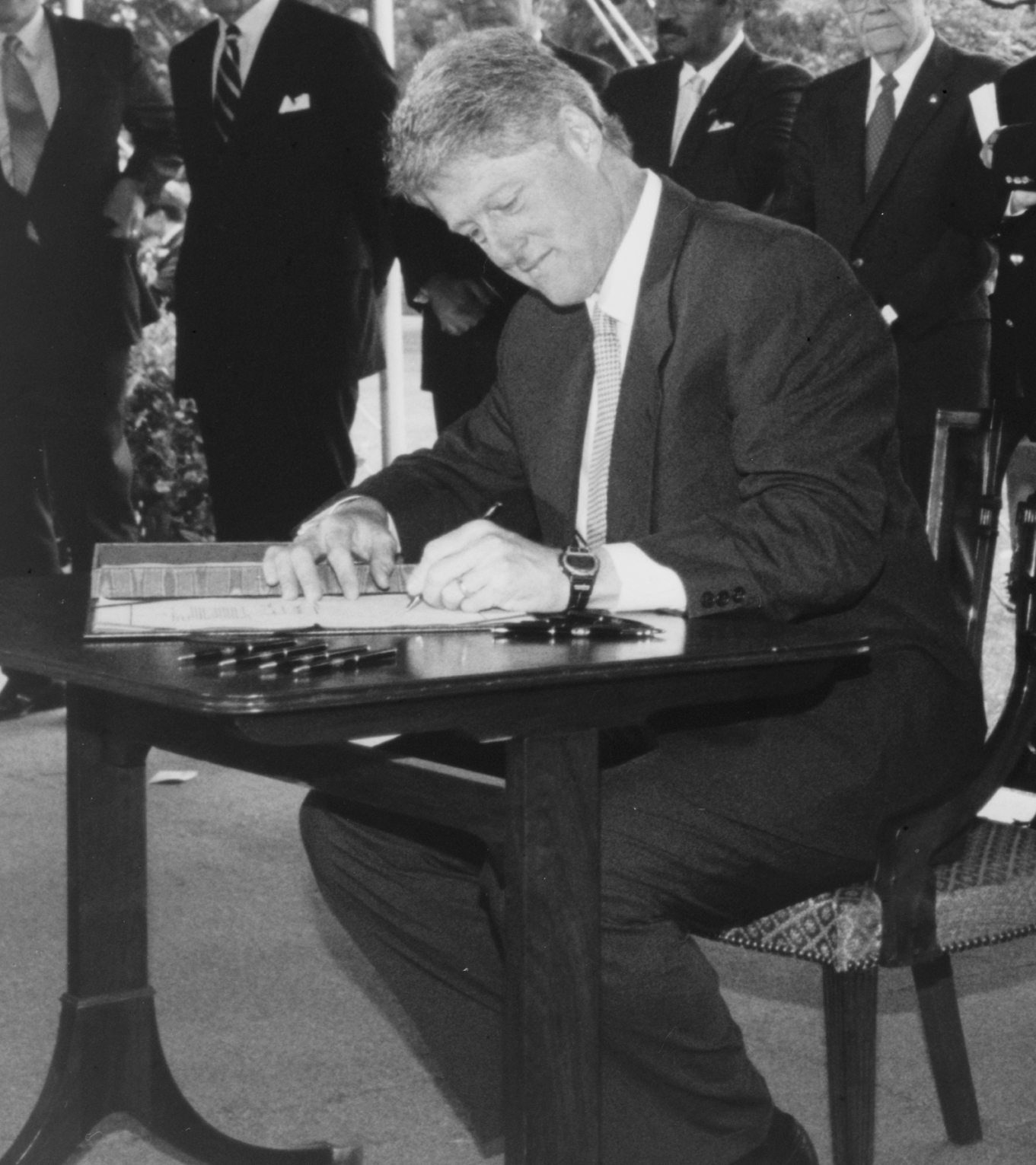
President Bill Clinton signing the National Voter Registration Act of 1993 into law

The National Voter Registration Act of 1993 (NVRA), also known as the Motor Voter Act, is a United States federal law signed by President Bill Clinton on May 20, 1993, that came into effect on January 1, 1995. The law was enacted under the Elections Clause of the United States Constitution and advances voting rights in the United States by requiring state governments to offer simplified voter registration processes for any eligible person who applies for or renews a driver's license or applies for public assistance, and requiring the United States Postal Service to mail election materials of a state as if the state is a nonprofit. The law requires states to register applicants that use a federal voter registration form, and prohibits states from removing registered voters from the voter rolls unless certain criteria are met.

The act exempts from its requirements states that have continuously since August 1, 1994 not required voter registration for federal elections or offered election day registration (EDR) for federal general elections. Six states qualify for the exemption: North Dakota, which does not require registration, and Idaho, Minnesota, New Hampshire, Wisconsin and Wyoming because of the EDR exemption. While some have asserted that Maine lost the exemption when it abolished EDR in 2011 (which it subsequently restored), Maine has never considered itself exempt from the act.

== Background ==
After Congress enacted the Voting Rights Act of 1965 to address rampant voting discrimination against racial minorities, voting rights advocates argued for federal legislation to remove other barriers to voter registration in the United States. In the early 1970s, Congress considered several proposals to require the U.S. Census Bureau to mail voter registration forms to every household, none of which passed. In the mid and late 1970s, proposals to require certain public agency offices to make voter registration forms available and to require states to allow Election Day voter registration failed.

Congress passed two pieces of legislation in the 1980s that made voter registration for federal elections more accessible for certain disadvantaged populations. The Voting Accessibility for the Elderly and Handicapped Act of 1984 requires states to make available to elderly and disabled voters "a reasonable number of accessible permanent registration facilities" and registration aids. The Uniformed and Overseas Citizens Absentee Voting Act of 1986 requires states to mail federal voter registration forms to overseas and military voters and permit them to register by mail.

In the light of low voter turnout in federal elections in the 1980s, Congress returned its attention to creating general voter registration standards in the late 1980s and early 1990s. Member of Congress introduced a series of "motor voter" bills to require state motor vehicle agencies to offer voter registration opportunities to persons applying for a driver's license. The first of these bills, the proposed National Voter Registration Act of 1989, passed in the House of Representatives with bipartisan support, but failed to pass in the Senate. A similar bill in 1991 [Introduced by Congressman Al Swift] gained less bipartisan support; it passed in both the Senate and the House but was vetoed by President George H. W. Bush. Two years later, Congress passed a nearly identical bill: the National Voter Registration Act of 1993.

== Scope and exemption ==
The act formally applies only to federal elections. However, because states have unified their voter registration systems for state and federal elections, the provisions functionally apply to both federal and state elections.

The act exempts from its requirements states that have continuously, since 1 August 1994, not required voter registration for federal elections or offered election day registration (EDR) for federal general elections. Six states qualify for exemption from the act: North Dakota, which does not require registration, while Idaho, Minnesota, New Hampshire, Wisconsin and Wyoming because of the EDR exemption. (Maine lost the exemption when it abolished EDR in 2011, although EDR was subsequently restored in that state. Several states have since August 1994 adopted some form of EDR, but these states are nevertheless subject to the act.)

== Provisions ==
=== Federal voter registration form ===
The NVRA requires States to "accept and use" a uniform federal form to register voters for federal elections. The National Mail Voter Registration Form (commonly referred to as the "Federal Form") was developed by the Federal Election Commission (FEC), but an amendment in the Help America Vote Act of 2002 transferred the FEC's responsibilities under the NVRA to the Election Assistance Commission (EAC). The federal form can be used by voter registration applicants as an alternative to state voter registration forms. The federal form requires that an applicant say, under penalty of perjury, various matters including that he or she is a citizen.

Between 2004 and 2013, Arizona required voter-registration officials to "reject" any application for registration, including a federal form, that was not accompanied by documentary proof of citizenship, such as a birth certificate. A group of Arizona residents and a group of nonprofit organizations challenged this Arizona law in federal court. The District Court ruled in favour of the Arizona law. The Ninth Circuit reversed, holding that the state's documentary proof-of-citizenship requirement was disallowed by the federal act. On June 17, 2013, the United States Supreme Court ruled against Arizona in Arizona v. Inter Tribal Council of Ariz., Inc. (2013). In a 7–2 decision written by Justice Antonin Scalia, the court held that the NVRA's mandate that states "accept and use" the federal form disallowed Arizona's documentary proof-of-citizenship requirement.

=== Voter registration of driver's license applicants ===
Section 5 of the act requires state motor vehicle offices to provide an opportunity for voter registration to anyone at the same time that they apply for a new or renewed driver's license or state identification card, and to require the state to forward the completed application to the appropriate state or local election official.

The act reduces costs to the state of voter registration by accumulating individual data when applying for a drivers license or receiving social assistance. The "motor voter" nickname came from the idea that most of the NVRA data was accumulated from applicants renewing or obtaining driver's licenses.

=== Voter registration at agencies providing public assistance ===
Section 7 of the act requires state agencies that provide public assistance – including those that administer federal assistance programs, such as food stamps, Medicaid, TANF, and WIC, and disability offices – to assist their applicants and clients in registering to vote during the application process. Each applicant for any of these services, renewal of services, or address changes must be provided with a voter registration form as well as assistance in completing the form and forwarding the completed application to the appropriate State or local election official.

The Federal Voting Assistance Program (FVAP) is responsible for administering NVRA for U.S. citizens abroad. FVAP allows eligible citizens to register to vote at 6,000 Armed Forces recruitment offices nationwide.

=== Mail voter registration ===
Section 6 of the act allows voter registration applicants to submit their voter registration forms by mail. It provides that citizens can register to vote by mail using mail-in-forms developed by each state and the Election Assistance Commission.

In 2004, the Nu Mu Lambda chapter of Alpha Phi Alpha fraternity held a voter registration drive in DeKalb County, Georgia, from which Georgia secretary of state Cathy Cox (Dem.) rejected all 63 voter registration applications on the basis that the fraternity did not follow correct procedures, including obtaining specific pre-clearance from the state to conduct their drive. Nu Mu Lambda filed Charles H. Wesley Education Foundation v. Cathy Cox (Wesley v. Cox) on the basis that Georgia's long-standing policy and practice of rejecting mail-in voter registration applications that were submitted in bundles, by persons other than registrars, deputy registrars, or "authorized persons", violated the requirements of the National Voter Registration Act by undermining voter registration drives. A senior U.S. district judge upheld earlier federal court decisions in the case, which also found private entities have a right, under the federal law, to engage in organized voter registration activity in Georgia at times and locations of their choosing, without the presence or permission of state or local election officials.

=== Other provisions ===
Section 8 of the act sets out requirements for how states maintain voter registration lists for federal elections. The act deems as timely those valid voter registration applications by eligible applicants submitted to designated state and local officials, or postmarked if submitted by mail, at least 30 days before a federal election. The act also requires the notification of all applicants of whether their voter registration applications were accepted or rejected.

The act requires states to keep voter registration lists accurate and current, such as identifying persons who have become ineligible due to having died or moved outside the jurisdiction. At the same time, the act requires list maintenance programs to incorporate specific safeguards, e.g., they must be uniform, non-discriminatory, in compliance with the Voting Rights Act, and not be undertaken within 90 days of a federal election.

The removal of voters for non-voting or for having moved can only be done after meeting the requirements set out in the act. Voters can be removed from registration lists when they have been convicted of a disqualifying crime or adjudged mentally incapacitated, where such removals are allowed by state law. The NVRA also provides additional safeguards under which registered voters would be able to vote notwithstanding a change in address in certain circumstances, such as when a voter has moved within a district or a precinct will retain the right to vote even if they have not re-registered at their new address.

== Compliance ==
Voting rights organizations have argued that many states have not been complying with the NVRA. In several states, organizations such as Demos, Project Vote, Campaign Legal Center and Lawyers' Committee for Civil Rights Under Law have filed lawsuits or sent pre-litigation letters. In some of these cases, this has resulted in changes in compliance.
