= List of United States Supreme Court cases, volume 570 =

This is a list of all the United States Supreme Court cases from volume 570 of the United States Reports:

Case name	Citation	Date decided
Arizona v. Inter Tribal Council of Arizona, Inc.	570 U.S. 1	June 17, 2013
Arizona's evidence-of-citizenship requirement, as applied to Federal Form applicants, is pre-empted by the National Voter Registration Act's mandate for states "accept and use" the Federal Form.
Maracich v. Spears	570 U.S. 48	June 17, 2013
An attorney's solicitation of clients is not a permissible purpose covered by the "litigation exception" to the federal Driver's Privacy Protection Act.
Alleyne v. United States	570 U.S. 99	June 17, 2013
Because mandatory minimum sentences increase the penalty for a crime, any fact that increases the mandatory minimum is an "element" of the crime that must be submitted to the jury.
FTC v. Actavis, Inc.	570 U.S. 136	June 17, 2013
Reverse payment settlements of patent litigations are not immune from antitrust liability.
Salinas v. Texas	570 U.S. 178	June 17, 2013
Fifth Amendment's privilege against self-incrimination does not extend to defendants who simply decide to remain mute during questioning.
Agency for International Development v. Alliance for Open Society International, Inc.	570 U.S. 205	June 20, 2013
The Policy Requirement violates the First Amendment by compelling as a condition of federal funding the affirmation of a belief that by its nature cannot be confined within the scope of the Government program.
American Express Co. v. Italian Colors Restaurant	570 U.S. 228	June 20, 2013
The prohibitively high cost of arbitration is not a sufficient reason for a court to overrule an arbitration clause that forbids class action suits.
Descamps v. United States	570 U.S. 254	June 20, 2013
Under the Armed Career Criminal Act, judges may not look at facts associated with a crime (the "modified categorical approach") when criminal statutes contain a single, indivisible set of elements
Fisher v. University of Texas at Austin	570 U.S. 297	June 24, 2013
The Fifth Circuit Court of Appeals failed to apply strict scrutiny in its decision affirming the admissions policy. The decision is vacated, and the case remanded for further consideration.
University of Texas Southwestern Medical Center v. Nassar	570 U.S. 338	June 24, 2013
A plaintiff establishes a violation of the retaliation provision of Title VII if the plaintiff proves that the defendant would not have made the adverse employment action but for the defendant's retaliatory motive.
United States v. Kebodeaux	570 U.S. 387	June 24, 2013
The Sex Offender Notification and Registration Act (SORNA) was found to be constitutional under the Necessary and Proper Clause. The circuit court's decision was reversed and remanded.
Vance v. Ball State University	570 U.S. 421	June 24, 2013
An employee is a "supervisor" for purposes of vicarious liability under Title VII only if he or she is empowered by the employer to take tangible employment actions against the victim.
Mutual Pharmaceutical Co. v. Bartlett	570 U.S. 472	June 24, 2013
Generic drug manufactures cannot be held liable for damages under state law when it conflicts with federal law.
Ryan v. Schad	570 U.S. 521	June 24, 2013
The Ninth Circuit abused its discretion when it neglected to issue its mandate after the Supreme Court denied certiorari. Grant, vacate, remand order.
Shelby County v. Holder	570 U.S. 529	June 25, 2013
Section 4 of the Voting Rights Act of 1965 is unconstitutional; its formula can no longer be used as a basis for subjecting jurisdictions to preclearance.
Koontz v. St. Johns River Water Management District	570 U.S. 595	June 25, 2013
When a discretionary land-use permit is denied because the applicant declines to pay for improvements to other, unrelated property, a challenge to the constitutionality of the denial must be evaluated under the "essential nexus" standard of Nollan v. California Coastal Commission and the "rough proportionality" requirement of Dolan v. City of Tigard.
Adoptive Couple v. Baby Girl	570 U.S. 637	June 25, 2013
Held that § 1912(f) does not apply to a parent who has never had custody of the child, that § 1912(d) only applies when a relationship between parent and child already exists, and that § 1915(a)'s preferences do not apply when there are no alternative parties seeking to adopt the child.
Hollingsworth v. Perry	570 U.S. 693	June 26, 2013
After lower courts ruled that California's ban on same-sex marriage was an unconstitutional violation of the right to equal protection under the law, the Supreme Court ruled that same-sex marriage opponents did not have standing to intervene as they could not demonstrate that they were harmed by the decision.
Sekhar v. United States	570 U.S. 729	June 26, 2013
Attempting to compel a person to recommend that his employer approve an investment does not constitute “the obtaining of property from another” under the Hobbs Act.
United States v. Windsor	570 U.S. 744	June 26, 2013
Section 3 of the Defense of Marriage Act, which federally defined marriage as a union between one man and one woman as husband and wife, is unconstitutional under the guarantee of equal protection that is prescribed by the Due Process Clause of the Fifth Amendment to the Constitution of the United States of America. The federal government must recognize same-sex marriages that have been approved by the states as legitimate.
