= Inter Tribal Council of Arizona =

Native American organization in Arizona

The Inter Tribal Council of Arizona represents the united voice of 21 tribal nations. The council's programs and advocacy include cultural issues, health, education, environmental issues, and community issues.

Educational projects include working with Arizona State University on archiving archaeological artifacts that have been recovered, as well as working on health programs.

== History ==
The council was founded in 1952 as a private non-profit corporation to promote Native American's "self-reliance through public policy development." Membership in the council includes governors and presidents of tribes, as well as tribal leaders. The council also works on voting registration, access and voting rights, which historically have been a "very long and hard political battle to win the right to vote" for Native Americans. Another project developing infrastructure projects on tribal lands to fulfill the needs of the respective communities.

== Member tribes ==
The tribes represented are: the Ak-Chin Indian Community; the Cocopah Indian Tribe; the Colorado River Indian Tribes; the Fort McDowell Yavapai Nation; the Fort Mojave Indian Tribe; the Gila River Indian Community; the Havasupai Tribe; the Hopi Tribe; the Hualapai Tribe; the Kaibab Band of Paiute Indians,; the Pascua Yaqui Tribe; the Pueblo of Zuni; the Quechan Tribe; the Salt River Pima-Maricopa Indian Community; the San Carlos Apache Tribe; the San Juan Southern Paiute; the Tohono O’odham Nation; the Tonto Apache Tribe; the White Mountain Apache Tribe; the Yavapai-Apache Nation; and the Yavapai-Prescott Indian Tribe.

== See also ==
Arizona v. Inter Tribal Council of Arizona, Inc.
