= 2003 term opinions of the Supreme Court of the United States =

October 2003 to October 2004 opinions

The 2003 term of the Supreme Court of the United States began October 6, 2003, and concluded October 3, 2004. The table illustrates which opinion was filed by each justice in each case and which justices joined each opinion.

== Table key ==
Delivered the court's opinion

Joined the court's opinion

Filed a concurrence

Joined a concurrence

Filed a dissent

Joined a dissent

Filed a concurrence/dissent

Joined a concurrence/dissent

Did not participate in the decision
- Decisions that do not note an argument date were decided without oral argument. Decisions that do not note a justice delivering the court's opinion are per curiam.
- Multiple concurrences and dissents within a case are numbered, with joining votes numbered accordingly. Justices frequently join multiple opinions in a single case; each vote is subdivided accordingly.
- An asterisk ( * ) in the court's opinion denotes that it was only a majority in part or a plurality. An asterisk in a joining vote denotes that the justice joined it only in part.
- A dash ( - ) denotes that the justice voted without filing or joining an opinion.

== 2003 term opinions ==
#	Case name and citation	Argued	Decided	Rehnquist	Stevens	O'Connor	Scalia	Kennedy	Souter	Thomas	Ginsburg	Breyer
1	Yarborough v. Gentry, 540 U.S. 1		October 20, 2003									
2	Mitchell v. Esparza, 540 U.S. 12		November 3, 2003									
3	Barnhart v. Thomas, 540 U.S. 20	October 14, 2003	November 12, 2003									
4	United States v. Banks, 540 U.S. 31	October 15, 2003	December 2, 2003									
5	Raytheon Co. v. Hernandez, 540 U.S. 44	October 8, 2003	December 2, 2003									
6	Virginia v. Maryland, 540 U.S. 56	October 7, 2003	December 9, 2003		1 / 2			1 / 2				
7	McConnell v. Federal Election Commission, 540 U.S. 93	September 8, 2003	December 10, 2003	2 / 2 / 1	1 / 2* / 3 / 2	1 / 2 / 3	2 / 1 / 2* / 3* / 1	2 / 2 / 1	1 / 2 / 3	2* / 2* / 3	1 / 2* / 3 / 2	1 / 2* / 3 / 2
8	Maryland v. Pringle, 540 U.S. 366	November 3, 2003	December 15, 2003									
9	Castro v. United States, 540 U.S. 375	October 15, 2003	December 15, 2003				*			*		
10	SEC v. Edwards, 540 U.S. 389	November 4, 2003	January 13, 2004									
11	Verizon Comm., Inc. v. Law Offices of Curtis V. Trinko, LLP, 540 U.S. 398	October 14, 2003	January 13, 2004									
12	Illinois v. Lidster, 540 U.S. 419	November 5, 2003	January 13, 2004		*				*		*	
13	Frew v. Hawkins, 540 U.S. 431	October 7, 2003	January 14, 2004									
14	Kontrick v. Ryan, 540 U.S. 443	November 3, 2003	January 14, 2004									
15	Alaska Dep't of Envtl. Conservation v. EPA, 540 U.S. 461	October 8, 2003	January 21, 2004									
16	Fellers v. United States, 540 U.S. 519	December 10, 2003	January 26, 2004									
17	Lamie v. United States Trustee, 540 U.S. 526	November 10, 2003	January 26, 2004				*					
18	Illinois v. Fisher, 540 U.S. 544		February 23, 2004									
19	Groh v. Ramirez, 540 U.S. 551	November 4, 2003	February 24, 2004	1 / 2*			2	1		2		
20	General Dynamics Land Systems, Inc. v. Cline, 540 U.S. 581	November 12, 2003	February 24, 2004				1	2		2		
21	Doe v. Chao, 540 U.S. 614	December 3, 2003	February 24, 2004		1		*				1	1 / 2
22	Olympic Airways v. Husain, 540 U.S. 644	November 12, 2003	February 24, 2004			*						
23	Banks v. Dretke, 540 U.S. 668	December 8, 2003	February 24, 2004				*			*		
24	Locke v. Davey, 540 U.S. 712	December 2, 2003	February 25, 2004				1			1 / 2		
25	United States Postal Serv. v. Flamingo Indus. (USA) Ltd., 540 U.S. 736	December 1, 2003	February 25, 2004									
26	Muhammad v. Close, 540 U.S. 749	December 1, 2003	February 25, 2004									
27	Raymond B. Yates, M.D., P.C. Profit Sharing Plan v. Hendon, 541 U.S. 1	January 13, 2004	March 2, 2004				1			2		
28	Baldwin v. Reese, 541 U.S. 27	December 8, 2003	March 2, 2004									
29	Crawford v. Washington, 541 U.S. 36	November 10, 2003	March 8, 2004									
30	Iowa v. Tovar, 541 U.S. 77	January 21, 2004	March 8, 2004									
31	S. Fla. Water Mgmt. Dist. v. Miccosukee Tribe of Indians, 541 U.S. 95	January 14, 2004	March 23, 2004				*					
32	United States v. Galletti, 541 U.S. 114	January 12, 2004	March 23, 2004									
33	Nixon v. Missouri Municipal League, 541 U.S. 125	January 12, 2004	March 24, 2004									
34	United States v. Flores-Montano, 541 U.S. 149	February 25, 2004	March 30, 2004									
35	Nat'l Archives & Records Admin. v. Favish, 541 U.S. 157	December 3, 2003	March 30, 2004									
36	BedRoc Ltd., LLC v. United States, 541 U.S. 176	January 20, 2004	March 31, 2004	*								
37	United States v. Lara, 541 U.S. 193	January 21, 2004	April 19, 2004		1			2		3		
38	Household Credit Servs. v. Pfennig, 541 U.S. 232	February 23, 2004	April 21, 2004									
39	Engine Mfrs. Ass'n v. S. Coast Air Quality Mgmt. Dist., 541 U.S. 246	January 14, 2004	April 28, 2004									
40	Vieth v. Jubelirer, 541 U.S. 267	December 10, 2003	April 28, 2004		1		*		2		2	3
41	Jones v. R. R. Donnelley & Sons Co., 541 U.S. 369	February 24, 2004	May 3, 2004									
42	Dretke v. Haley, 541 U.S. 386	March 2, 2004	May 3, 2004		1			1 / 2	1			
43	Scarborough v. Principi, 541 U.S. 401	February 23, 2004	May 3, 2004									
44	Johnson v. California, 541 U.S. 428	March 30, 2004	May 3, 2004									
45	Middleton v. McNeil, 541 U.S. 433		May 3, 2004									
46	Tennessee Student Assistance Corp. v. Hood, 541 U.S. 440	March 1, 2004	May 17, 2004									
47	Till v. SCS Credit Corp., 541 U.S. 465	December 2, 2003	May 17, 2004		*							
48	Tennessee v. Lane, 541 U.S. 509	January 13, 2004	May 17, 2004	1			2	1	1 / 2	1 / 3	1 / 2	2
49	Grupo Dataflux v. Atlas Global Group, L.P., 541 U.S. 567	March 3, 2004	May 17, 2004									
50	Sabri v. United States, 541 U.S. 600	March 3, 2004	May 17, 2004				* / 1	* / 1		2		
51	Thornton v. United States, 541 U.S. 615	March 31, 2004	May 24, 2004	*		* / 1	2				2	
52	Nelson v. Campbell, 541 U.S. 637	March 29, 2004	May 24, 2004									
53	Yarborough v. Alvarado, 541 U.S. 652	March 1, 2004	June 1, 2004									
54	Republic of Austria v. Altmann, 541 U.S. 677	February 25, 2004	June 7, 2004				1		2			2
55	Central Laborers' Pension Fund v. Heinz, 541 U.S. 739	April 19, 2004	June 7, 2004									
56	DOT v. Pub. Citizen, 541 U.S. 752	April 21, 2004	June 7, 2004									
57	City of Littleton v. Z. J. Gifts D-4, L.L.C., 541 U.S. 774	March 24, 2004	June 7, 2004		* / 1		2	* / 3	* / 3			
58	Elk Grove Unified Sch. Dist. v. Newdow, 542 U.S. 1	March 24, 2004	June 14, 2004	1		1 / 2				1* / 3		
59	Norton v. S. Utah Wilderness Alliance, 542 U.S. 55	March 29, 2004	June 14, 2004									
60	United States v. Dominguez Benitez, 542 U.S. 74	April 21, 2004	June 14, 2004									
61	Hibbs v. Winn, 542 U.S. 88	January 20, 2004	June 14, 2004									
62	Pennsylvania State Police v. Suders, 542 U.S. 129	March 31, 2004	June 14, 2004									
63	F. Hoffmann-La Roche Ltd v. Empagran S. A., 542 U.S. 155	April 26, 2004	June 14, 2004									
64	Hiibel v. Sixth Judicial District Court of Nevada, 542 U.S. 177	March 22, 2004	June 21, 2004		1				2		2	2
65	Aetna Health Inc. v. Davila, 542 U.S. 200	March 23, 2004	June 21, 2004									
66	Pliler v. Ford, 542 U.S. 225	April 26, 2004	June 21, 2004		1	2			1		1	1 / 2
67	Intel Corp. v. Advanced Micro Devices, Inc., 542 U.S. 241	April 20, 2004	June 21, 2004									
68	Tennard v. Dretke, 542 U.S. 274	March 22, 2004	June 24, 2004	1			2			3		
69	Blakely v. Washington, 542 U.S. 296	March 23, 2004	June 24, 2004	1*		1 / 3		1* / 2				1 / 2 / 3
70	Schriro v. Summerlin, 542 U.S. 348	April 19, 2004	June 24, 2004									
71	Cheney v. United States District Court, 542 U.S. 367	April 27, 2004	June 24, 2004				*			*		
72	Beard v. Banks, 542 U.S. 406	February 24, 2004	June 24, 2004		1				1 / 2		1 / 2	1
73	Rumsfeld v. Padilla, 542 U.S. 426	April 28, 2004	June 28, 2004									
74	Rasul v. Bush, 542 U.S. 466	April 20, 2004	June 28, 2004									
75	Hamdi v. Rumsfeld, 542 U.S. 507	April 28, 2004	June 28, 2004		1	*	1			2		
76	Missouri v. Seibert, 542 U.S. 600	December 9, 2003	June 28, 2004					1	*			2
77	United States v. Patane, 542 U.S. 630	December 9, 2003	June 28, 2004		1				1	*	1	2
78	Holland v. Jackson, 542 U.S. 649		June 28, 2004		-				-		-	-
79	Ashcroft v. American Civil Liberties Union, 542 U.S. 656	March 2, 2004	June 29, 2004	2		2	1					2
80	Sosa v. Alvarez-Machain, 542 U.S. 692	March 30, 2004	June 29, 2004	* / 1			* / 1			* / 1	* / 2	* / 2 / 3
#	Case name and citation	Argued	Decided	Rehnquist	Stevens	O'Connor	Scalia	Kennedy	Souter	Thomas	Ginsburg	Breyer

== 2003 term membership and statistics ==
This was the eighteenth term of Chief Justice Rehnquist's tenure, and the tenth consecutive term in which the Court's membership had not changed.

Justice		Appointment history		Agreement with judgment		Opinions filed				
Seniority	Name	President	Date confirmed	%	#					Total
Chief Justice	William Rehnquist	Richard Nixon	January 7, 1972	85%	68/80	9	2	0	3	14
Associate Justice	John Paul Stevens	Gerald Ford	December 19, 1975	76.3%	61/80	8	9	1	11	29
Associate Justice	Sandra Day O'Connor	Ronald Reagan	September 25, 1981	93.6%	73/78	8	4	0	2	14
Associate Justice	Antonin Scalia	Ronald Reagan	September 26, 1986	74.7%	59/79	9	10	2	9	30
Associate Justice	Anthony Kennedy	Ronald Reagan	February 18, 1988	86.3%	69/80	8	7	1	7	23
Associate Justice	David Souter	George H. W. Bush	October 9, 1990	78.5%	62/79	9	3	1	5	18
Associate Justice	Clarence Thomas	George H. W. Bush	October 23, 1991	78.8%	63/80	9	6	3	9	27
Associate Justice	Ruth Bader Ginsburg	Bill Clinton	August 10, 1993	80%	64/80	9	3	0	4	16
Associate Justice	Stephen Breyer	Bill Clinton	August 3, 1994	80.8%	63/78	7	5	0	10	22
Notes on statistics: Opinion counts only include the bench opinions listed above; opinions relating to orders or in-chambers opinions are not included.; Agreement with the Court's judgment does not guarantee agreement with the reasoning expressed in its opinion. A justice is not considered in agreement if they dissented even in part. Agreement percentages are based only on the listed cases in which a justice participated and are rounded to the nearest one-tenth of one percentage point.; Individual opinion counts will not match the Court's totals; Stevens and O'Connor's jointly authored opinion for the Court in McConnell v. FEC is counted separately for both justices but counted only once in the Court's totals.						Totals				
						75	49	8	60	192
