= Karapiro (disambiguation) =

Karapiro is a settlement and rural area in the Waipa District and Waikato region of New Zealand's North Island.

Karapiro may also refer to:

- Karapiro Power Station, a hydroelectric power station on Waikato River, in the North Island of New Zealand
- Karapiro (New Zealand electorate)
- Lake Karapiro, an artificial reservoir lake on the Waikato River, southeast of Hamilton in New Zealand's North Island
