= Pittman Underground Water Act =

- Long title: An Act To encourage the reclamation of certain arid lands in the State of Nevada, and for other purposes.
- Enacted by: the 66th United States Congress

Citations
- Public law: Pub. L. 66–60
- Statutes at Large: 41 Stat. 293–295, ch. 77

Legislative history
- Introduced in the Senate as S. 9; Passed the Senate on July 9, 1919; Passed the House on October 6, 1919

United States Supreme Court cases
- BedRoc Limited, LLC v. United States, 541 U.S. 176 (2004)

The Pittman Underground Water Act (Pub. L. 66–60) was an Act of Congress, that was approved on October 22, 1919, and was repealed on August 11, 1964. The public law gave the Secretary of the Interior the power to hand out permits to American citizens and associations to drill for and look for groundwater on public lands in Nevada. In addition, the law gave the Secretary the power to give patents to permittees who found enough groundwater to sustain a farm. The law was supposed to stimulate agriculture in Nevada by supporting the development of artesian waters, since it was thought that the absence of surface water undermined the growth of the agricultural sector in Nevada.

The Pittman Underground Water Act was applied in BedRoc Limited, LLC v. United States, a 2004 decision by the United States Supreme Court. The majority of the Court argued that sand and gravel were no "valuable minerals" that were reserved to the government of the United States under the Pittman Underground Water Act and reversed the decision of the Ninth Circuit.

== Background ==
Senator Francis G. Newlands, who represented Nevada, was the father of the main irrigation legislation passed before the Pittman Underground Water Act. However, his ability to make a law that was favorable to Nevada was restricted by the fact that he was practically the only Democrat from the western United States. Before the Pittman Underground Water Act was approved, numerous proposals failed to pass Congress that would have provided funding for the exploration of groundwater in Nevada.

Officials of the Tonopah and Tidewater Railroad pushed for the Pittman Underground Water Act, as that company wanted to attract farmers to the Amargosa Valley in Nevada, so that more people would use the railroad. In 1915, the company established a demonstration farm near Leeland, called the T&T Ranch, to show people the farming possibilities of the area. However, no homesteaders settled, since the Homestead Act included terms that were hard to meet. For example, a surface water supply sufficient to grow crops on 160 acres of land had to be established.

== Legislative history ==
Senator Key Pittman worked four years on the Pittman Underground Water Act: the bill passed the Congress after four failed attempts. Pittman first introduced a similar bill, S. 7109, on December 29, 1914, during the third session of the 63rd Congress. Arizona Senator Carl Hayden introduced an identical bill in the House, H.R. 21377, that same session at Pittman's request. Both bills were reported in February 1915. The House bill was amended by the Committee on Public Lands to put money received from the sale of other lands in a reclamation fund. Both bills died, although S. 7109 had passed the Senate. Pittman later said the bill failed, because "it met with serious opposition on the very ground that it might be used for the purpose of grabbing mineral lands."

That same year, Pittman introduced a bill with the same purpose, S. 2519. It was reported in December, and it included a mineral reservation contrary to the previous bills. Pittman said he preferred a bill without such reservation, but he said that "would mean the destruction of the bill." Colorado Senator Charles S. Thomas tried to eliminate the section with the mineral reservation, but the Senate rejected the amendment. Another amendment passed, that removed a provision that would give part of the money earned by the bill to the State of Nevada. It was sent to the House after being passed by the Senate. The House Committee on Irrigation of Arid Lands reported the bill favorably, but it did not receive any consideration by the House. Again, Pittman introduced a similar bill, S. 27, in the Senate during the 65th Congress. That bill was not considered by the House as well after passing the Senate.

After Charles R. Evans became member of the House of Representatives, the law passed the House as well during the first session of the 66th Congress. The bill was amended by the Senate Committee on Public Lands, and it passed the Senate and the House on July 9, 1919, and October 6, 1919, respectively. The Pittman Underground Water Act was approved by the president on October 22. Two years later, a law was approved by the 67th Congress that made it possible for the Secretary of the Interior to extend the period in which the permittee had to find groundwater with a maximum of two years. This addition passed the Senate and the House as S. 2983 on March 31, 1922, and June 30 of the same year, respectively. The bill was approved on September 22.

The law didn't succeed in stimulating the Nevada agricultural sector significantly and was therefore repealed by the 88th United States Congress in its second session. The bill that repealed the Pittman Underground Water Act was introduced in the House as H.R. 1892 by Colorado Representative Wayne N. Aspinall and passed the House on March 18, 1963. It passed the Senate on August 1, 1964, and was approved ten days later. All applications for permits that were filed before the law was repealed were unaffected by the repeal.

== Contents ==
The Pittman Underground Water Act states that the Secretary of the Interior has the right to give permits to drill for and look for groundwater in the state of Nevada. Such permit can be granted to any American citizen or association and the receiver is given the exclusive right to look for groundwater in an area of not more than 2,560 acres for a maximum of two years. (Note: Public law 335, that went into effect in 1922, made it possible for the Secretary of the Interior to extend this period by two years at most.) This land should be public and furthermore unreserved, unappropriated, non-mineral, and non-timbered. Moreover, it is not possible to apply for land where irrigation is already known to be possible. Someone can receive only one permit per 40 miles (64 kilometres) square. Moreover, the receiver of the permit is not allowed to build a fence around the land and he cannot deny others from using it.

The law also states that a filing fee has to be paid for applying for a permit. After a person receives a permit, he must start searching for water within six months and he must continue doing so regularly until he has found groundwater. If a receiver of a permit doesn't meet the conditions, the permit is cancelled and the receiver can't apply for another one. The receiver of the permit can acquire a patent to the land when he has discovered enough groundwater to maintain crops on an area of at least 20 acres and has developed it. When a patent is granted, the receiver acquires a fourth of the land of the permit (not more than 640 acres). The remainder of the land can be acquired for agriculture only under the terms of the Homestead Act of 1862. The last section of the Pittman Underground Water Act states that "all the coal and other valuable minerals" are reserved to the United States and that the United States has the right to remove them.
