= Karapiro =

Settlement in Waikato, New Zealand

- Village
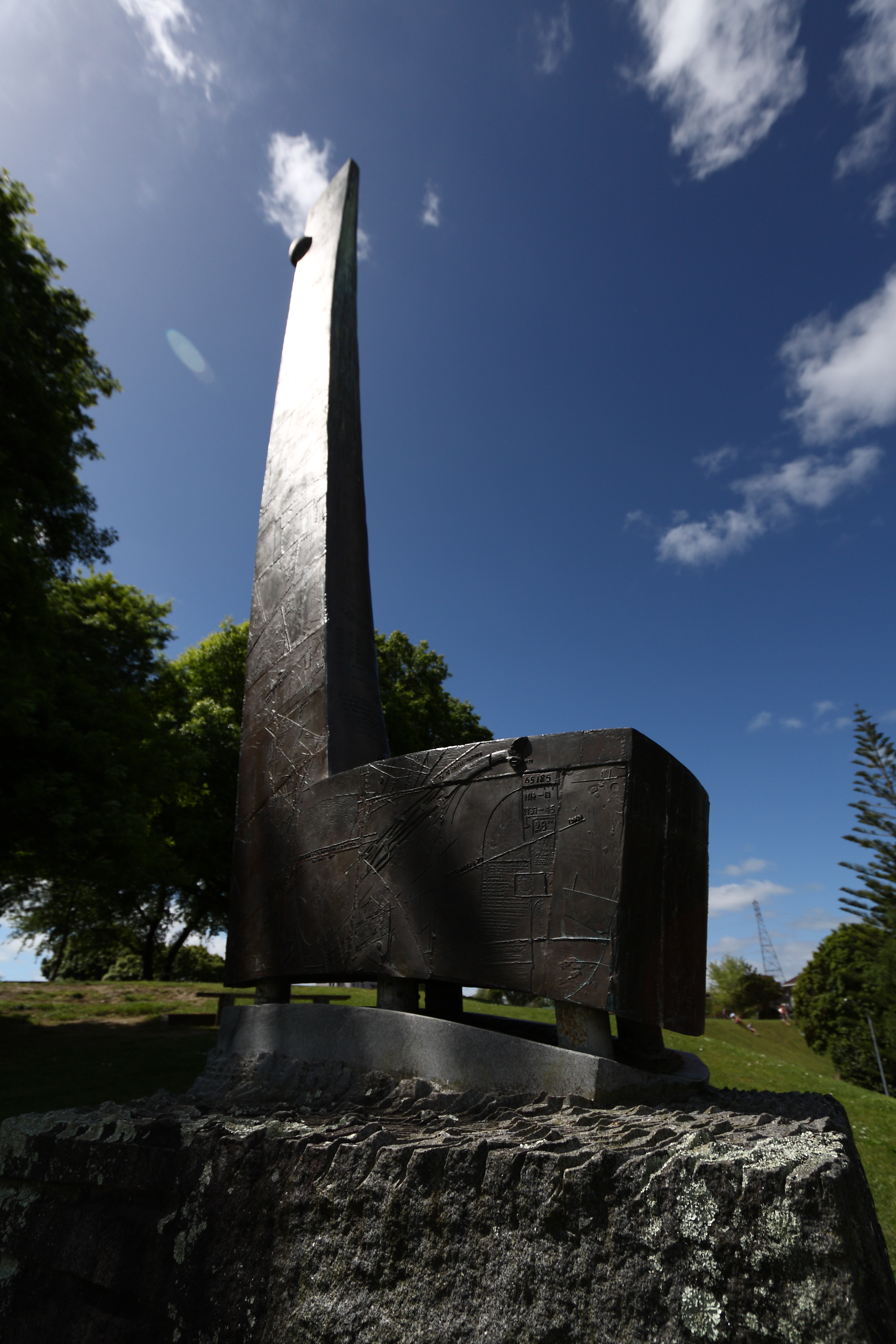
- Sculpture at Karapiro Dam lookout
- Interactive map of Karapiro
- Coordinates: 37.922°S 175.541°E
- Country: New Zealand
- Region: Waikato
- District: Waipā District
- Ward: Maungatautari General Ward; Cambridge General Ward
- Electorates: Taupō; Hauraki-Waikato (Māori)

Government
  - Territorial Authority: Waipā District Council
  - Regional council: Waikato Regional Council
  - Mayor of Waipa: Mike Pettit
  - Taupō MP: Louise Upston
  - Hauraki-Waikato MP: Hana-Rawhiti Maipi-Clarke

Area
  - Territorial: 0.96 km^{2} (0.37 sq mi)

Population (June 2025)
  - Territorial: 320
  - Density: 330/km^{2} (860/sq mi)
- Time zone: UTC+12 (NZST)
  - Summer (DST): UTC+13 (NZDT)
- Area code: 07

Karapiro (Māori: Karāpiro) is a settlement and rural area in the Waipā District and Waikato region of New Zealand's North Island. It includes both the artificially created Lake Karapiro and the accompanying Karāpiro Power Station. Karapiro is located just off State Highway 1, south-west of Cambridge.

== History ==
In about 1600, Te Ihingarangi built a pā (fortified village) called Te Tiki o Ihingarangi near where Lake Karapiro is today.

In 1830 Ngāti Hauā defeated Ngāti Maru in a battle at Taumatawīwī, two kilometres south of Karapiro Domain. On the orders of the Ngāti Hauā chief Te Waharoa, his dead warriors were cremated, this taking place on rocks beside the Waikato River, the location then becoming known as Karāpiro, from the Māori language words karā, meaning "basaltic stone", and piro, meaning "foul smelling". The site was flooded when the dam was built and the lake created in 1947.

A man opened fire inside the Karapiro Cafe and Grits in April 2019. The suspect was later put under mental health care; the victim survived with serious injuries.

== Demographics ==
Statistics New Zealand describes Karapiro Village as a rural settlement, which covers 0.96 km^{2} (0.37 sq mi). It had an estimated population of 320 as of June 2025, with a population density of 333 people per km^{2}. The settlement is part of the larger Karapiro statistical area.

Historical population for Karapiro Village
Year	Pop.	±% p.a.
2006	207	—
2013	201	−0.42%
2018	300	+8.34%
2023	315	+0.98%

Karapiro Village had a population of 315 in the 2023 New Zealand census, an increase of 15 people (5.0%) since the 2018 census, and an increase of 114 people (56.7%) since the 2013 census. There were 162 males and 153 females in 114 dwellings. 1.0% of people identified as LGBTIQ+. The median age was 44.8 years (compared with 38.1 years nationally). There were 54 people (17.1%) aged under 15 years, 51 (16.2%) aged 15 to 29, 162 (51.4%) aged 30 to 64, and 48 (15.2%) aged 65 or older.

People could identify as more than one ethnicity. The results were 90.5% European (Pākehā); 15.2% Māori; 1.0% Pasifika; 4.8% Asian; 1.9% Middle Eastern, Latin American and African New Zealanders (MELAA); and 5.7% other, which includes people giving their ethnicity as "New Zealander". English was spoken by 99.0%, Māori by 1.9%, and other languages by 7.6%. No language could be spoken by 1.0% (e.g. too young to talk). New Zealand Sign Language was known by 1.0%. The percentage of people born overseas was 22.9, compared with 28.8% nationally.

Religious affiliations were 41.9% Christian, and 1.0% other religions. People who answered that they had no religion were 49.5%, and 6.7% of people did not answer the census question.

Of those at least 15 years old, 75 (28.7%) people had a bachelor's or higher degree, 156 (59.8%) had a post-high school certificate or diploma, and 33 (12.6%) people exclusively held high school qualifications. The median income was $51,100, compared with $41,500 nationally. 57 people (21.8%) earned over $100,000 compared to 12.1% nationally. The employment status of those at least 15 was 138 (52.9%) full-time, 48 (18.4%) part-time, and 6 (2.3%) unemployed.

=== Karapiro statistical area ===
Karapiro statistical area, which also includes Te Miro, covers 190.82 km^{2} (73.68 sq mi) and had an estimated population of 2,700 as of June 2025, with a population density of 14 people per km^{2}.

Historical population for the statistical area
Year	Pop.	±% p.a.
2006	1,794	—
2013	1,950	+1.20%
2018	2,334	+3.66%
2023	2,523	+1.57%

The statistical area had a population of 2,523 in the 2023 New Zealand census, an increase of 189 people (8.1%) since the 2018 census, and an increase of 573 people (29.4%) since the 2013 census. There were 1,266 males, 1,251 females, and 9 people of other genders in 906 dwellings. 1.8% of people identified as LGBTIQ+. The median age was 42.4 years (compared with 38.1 years nationally). There were 519 people (20.6%) aged under 15 years, 387 (15.3%) aged 15 to 29, 1,263 (50.1%) aged 30 to 64, and 354 (14.0%) aged 65 or older.

People could identify as more than one ethnicity. The results were 94.8% European (Pākehā); 8.9% Māori; 1.5% Pasifika; 2.6% Asian; 0.6% Middle Eastern, Latin American and African New Zealanders (MELAA); and 2.6% other, which includes people giving their ethnicity as "New Zealander". English was spoken by 97.9%, Māori by 1.3%, and other languages by 6.9%. No language could be spoken by 1.9% (e.g. too young to talk). New Zealand Sign Language was known by 0.4%. The percentage of people born overseas was 20.1, compared with 28.8% nationally.

Religious affiliations were 32.3% Christian, 0.1% Hindu, 0.2% Buddhist, 0.4% New Age, and 0.6% other religions. People who answered that they had no religion were 59.6%, and 6.8% of people did not answer the census question.

Of those at least 15 years old, 537 (26.8%) people had a bachelor's or higher degree, 1,122 (56.0%) had a post-high school certificate or diploma, and 345 (17.2%) people exclusively held high school qualifications. The median income was $53,100, compared with $41,500 nationally. 426 people (21.3%) earned over $100,000 compared to 12.1% nationally. The employment status of those at least 15 was 1,125 (56.1%) full-time, 372 (18.6%) part-time, and 36 (1.8%) unemployed.

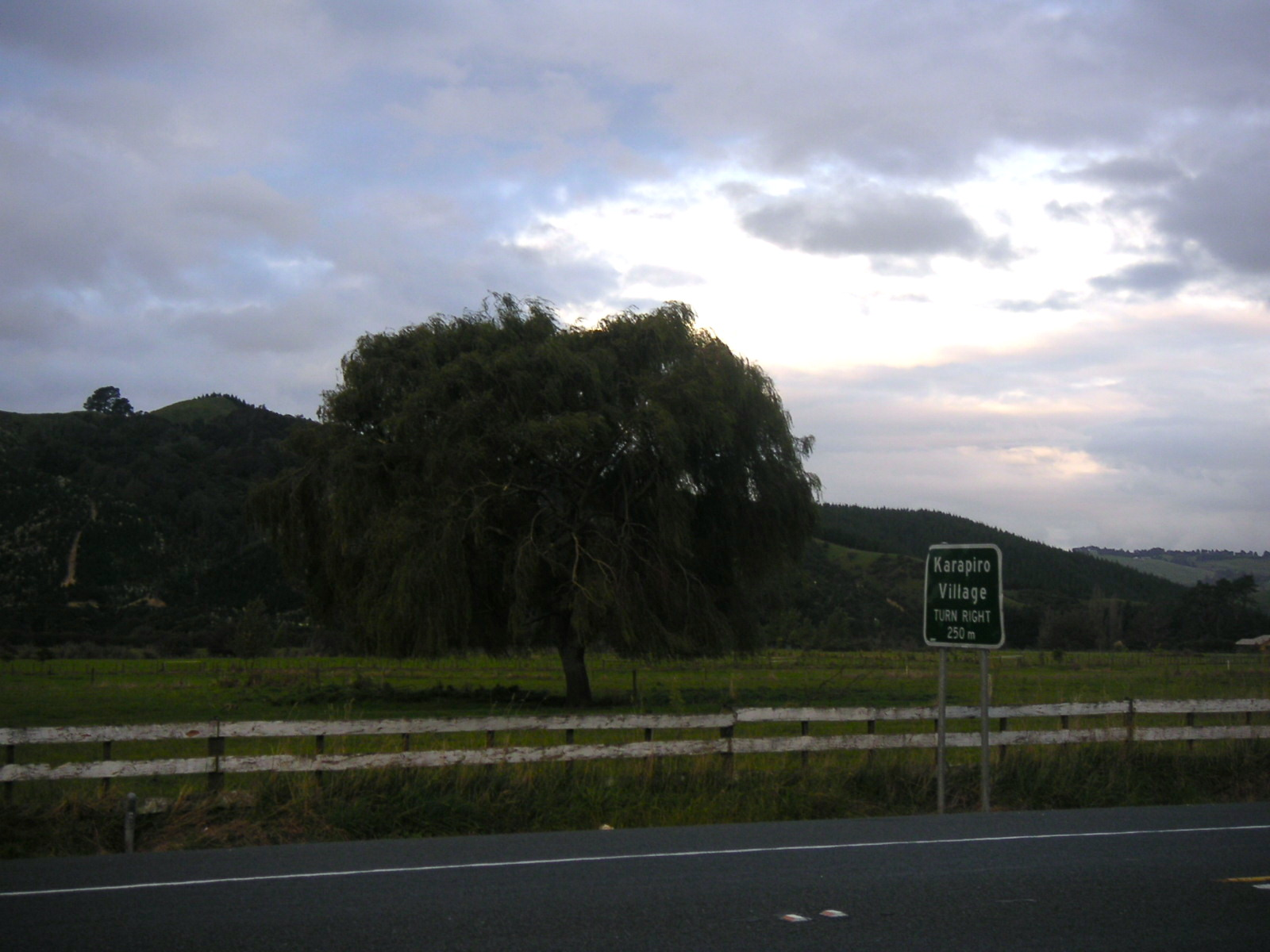
Street side in Karapiro, 2004

== Lake Karapiro ==
Lake Karapiro is an artificial reservoir lake on the Waikato River, formed in 1947 by damming the Waikato River to store water for the 96-megawatt Karapiro hydroelectric power station.

The lake is regarded as one of New Zealand's best rowing venues. It hosted the World Rowing Championships in 1978 and 2010, as well as the rowing events for the 1950 British Empire Games. Lake Karapiro alternates with the South Island's Lake Ruataniwha in hosting the New Zealand national rowing championships and the New Zealand secondary school rowing championships (Maadi Cup). In March 2006, an International Rowing Federation inspection panel described Karapiro as one of the fairest and most picturesque courses in the world.

== Karāpiro Power Station ==
The 96-megawatt Karāpiro Power Station is located adjacent to the dam at the head of the lake, and is the eighth and last hydroelectric power station located on the Waikato River. Water for the power station up to 362 cubic metres per second (12,800 cu ft/s) at full power, is taken from the lake and passed through three Kaplan turbines in the powerhouse, before being deposited into the lower Waikato River. Each turbine turns a 32 MW generator, and the electricity from the generators is fed into Transpower's national transmission grid. The station is a base load generator due to its need to maintain water flows into the Waikato River system beyond the lake.

The ten-megawatt Horahora Power Station at Horahora, 13 km upstream of Karapiro Dam, part of an earlier hydroelectric power scheme, was flooded with the formation of Lake Karapiro.

== Education ==
Karāpiro School is a co-educational state primary school for Year 1 to 6 students, with a roll of 24 as of July 2026. The school opened in 1921.
