= Lee Camp =

Lee Camp may refer to:

- Lee Camp (comedian) (born 1980), American comedian
- Lee Camp (footballer) (born 1984), Northern Ireland footballer

== See also ==
- Lees Camp (disambiguation)
