= Pōkaiwhenua Stream =

Location
- Country: New Zealand

Physical characteristics
- Source
  - location: w. slope of Mount Tikorangi
  - elevation: approximately 610 metres (2,000 ft) ASL
- Mouth
  - location: Lake Karapiro, Waikato River
  - coordinates: 37°59′09″S 175°39′32″E
  - elevation: 53 metres (174 ft) ASL
- Length: 56 km (35 mi)

The Pōkaiwhenua Stream is a tributary of the Waikato River. It flows into Waikato River at Lake Karapiro.

The Pōkaiwhenua Stream is approximately 56 km in length. The Waikato River Trail starts close to the mouth of the stream.
