= T&T Ranch =

American demonstration farm and dairy in Nevada

Coordinates: 36°31′50″N 116°31′10″W

Location of the T&T Ranch in Nevada

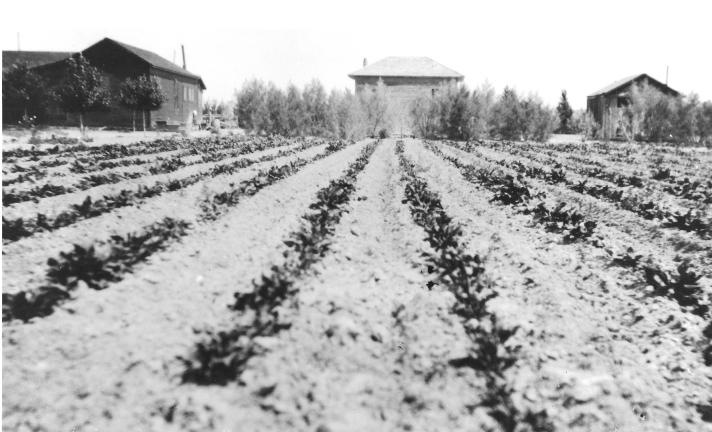
A field of sugar beets and several structures of the T&T Ranch in the background (ca. 1920)

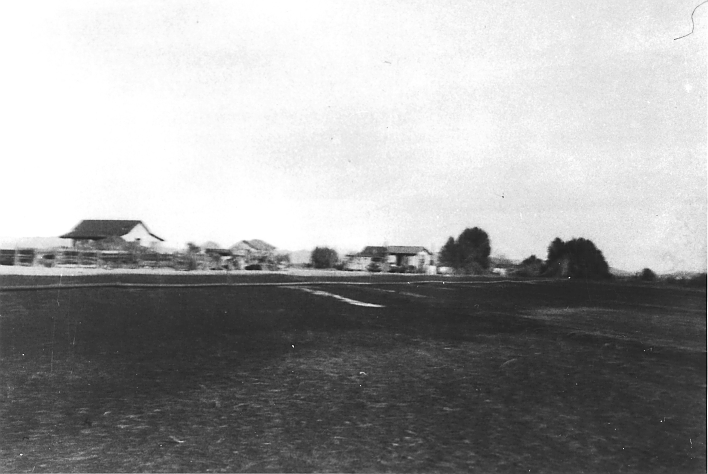
Annexes of the farm (perhaps ca. 1920)

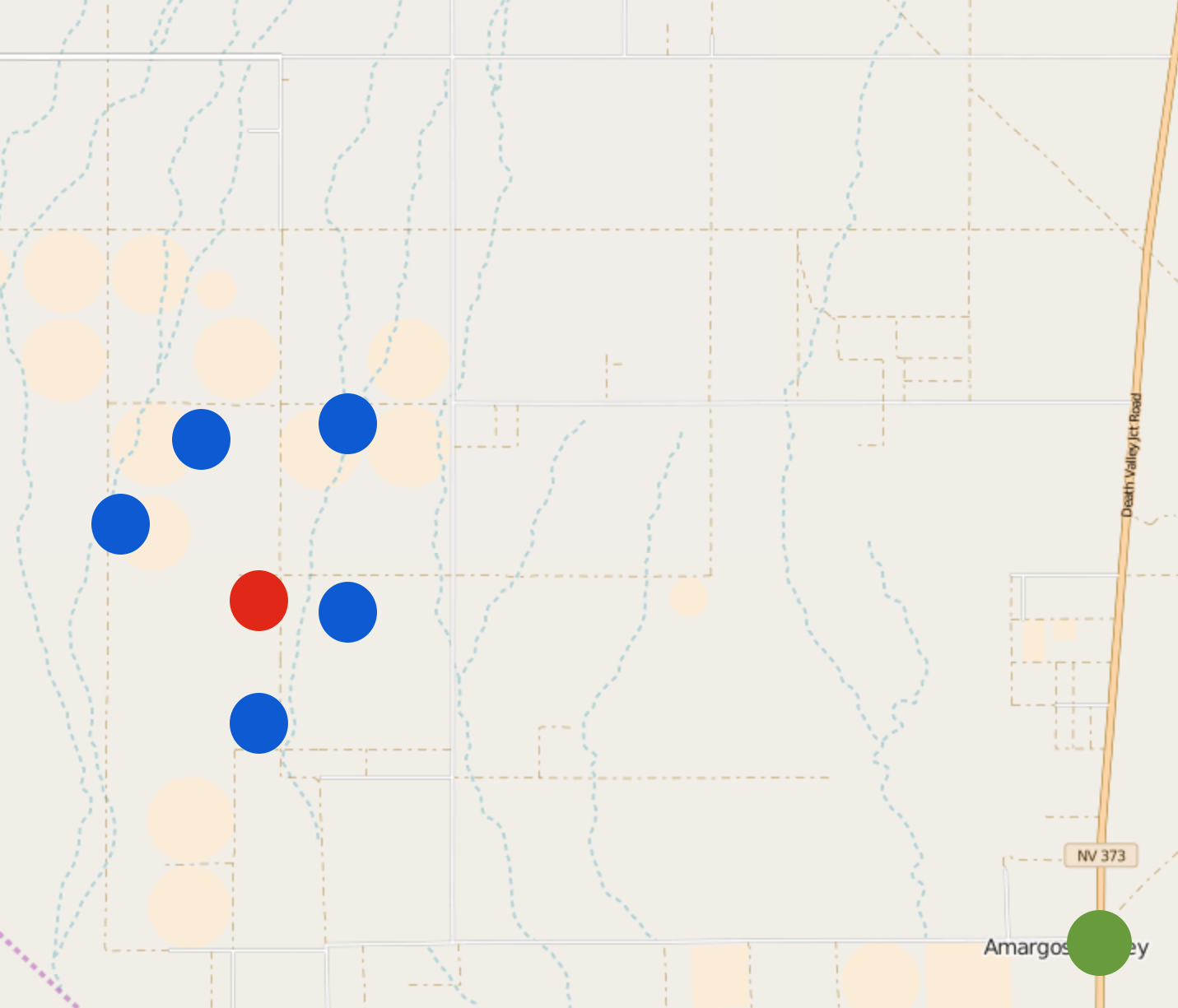
Map of the T&T Ranch showing the well from 1917 in red, the five wells from 1921 in blue, and the plot of land at the crossing of SR 373 and Mecca Road in green

The T&T Ranch (also written as TT Ranch and T and T Ranch) was a demonstration farm and dairy, that was situated in the Amargosa Valley, 5.5 miles (9 kilometres) southeast of Leeland in Nye County, Nevada. It was owned by the Tonopah and Tidewater Railroad between its foundation in 1915 and the 1940s. During that time five pieces of land were added to the property, that were obtained under the Pittman Underground Water Act. The T&T Ranch was thereafter occupied by Gordon and Billie Bettles.

== History ==
=== Background and foundation ===
The T&T Ranch was established between 1915 and 1917 by the Tonopah and Tidewater Railroad in order to attract homesteaders to the area. The demonstration farm showed the agricultural possibilities of the area to potential settlers. The Tonopah and Tidewater Railroad wanted to increase its profit and reasoned that if homesteaders would settle in the area they would use the railway to transport their products. The Amargosa Valley was suitable for agriculture, because enough groundwater was available. Before the T&T Ranch was founded, officials of the Tonopah and Tidewater Railroad visited the area multiple times in 1914 and 1915.

When the T&T Ranch was founded, multiple cabins were brought in from Rhyolite, after which the land was cleared. The latter took several months. The T&T Ranch's first irrigation well, that was 165 feet (50 metres) deep, was drilled around 1917 and got its water from the underflow of the Amargosa River. When the 10-acre demonstration farm started operating, it featured a barn, corrals, and some other auxiliary structures. The T&T Ranch was operated by employees of the railway company. The technology at the farm was ostensibly run by the University of Nevada. The first foreman of the demonstration farm was Harry P. Gower, an employee of the Pacific Coast Borax Company – the company that owned the Tonopah and Tidewater Railroad.

=== Ownership by the Tonopah and Tidewater Railroad ===
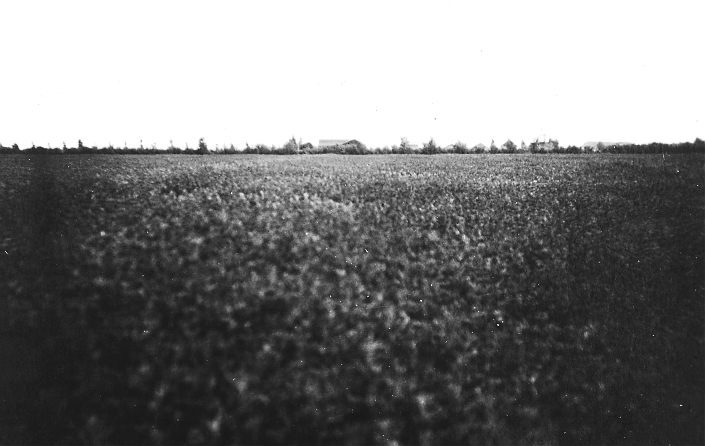
A field of alfalfa with the ranch house and some annexes in the background (ca. 1920)

The T&T Ranch was regularly visited by professors of the University of Nevada and by Nevada politicians, especially during the winter. Among the crops that were harvested was alfalfa. The tenth reap of the plant took place in 1921. That harvest season, an average of fifteen tons of alfalfa were reaped per acre.

Although the T&T Ranch had been established in order to attract homesteaders, no farmers had settled in the area since its foundation. Potential settlers were discouraged by the Homestead Act until 1919, when Congress passed the Pittman Underground Water Act, that provided more attractive conditions for homesteaders. After this bill was passed, five Pacific Coast Borax Company officials founded homesteads around the T&T Ranch. The names of these officials were: F. M. Jenifer, F. W. Corkhill, U. S. Miller, W. W. Cahill, and C. B. Zabriskie. In 1921, five observation wells for these farms were drilled. The new farms formed a contiguous block. Not long after the claims of the five homesteaders had been patented in 1927, they transferred their farms to the Pacific Coast Borax Company.

In the 1930s, a farm building and some annexes were added to the T&T Ranch, which then also comprised the five homesteads. In addition, several wells were constructed with depths varying from 72–88 feet (22–27 m). During that time, multiple crops were grown, including grapes, nuts, several other fruits, and alfalfa. The T&T Ranch also featured a small dairy. The farm supplied the Furnace Creek Inn and the Amargosa Hotel with milk and vegetables. Both hotels were owned by the Pacific Coast Borax Company. The demonstration farm was vacated in the early 1940s after the Tonopah and Tidewater Railroad was shut down. When the nearby road between Amargosa Valley and Death Valley Junction was paved in the late 1940s, the T&T Ranch was used to accommodate some of the construction workers. In order to accommodate these people, a number of structures were moved to the property.

=== Gordon and Billie Bettles ===
In the second half of the 1940s, Gordon and Billie Bettles acquired an option to buy the T&T Ranch from the Pacific Coast Borax Company. When they moved in, they were the only inhabitants in the area and most of the trees and grapevines had died. Gordon and Billie Bettles moved a structure, that used to house railway workers, from Death Valley Junction to the farm to use as their home. Billie erected a garden around the house. Crops that were cultivated included alfalfa and corn and an irrigation system using siphon tubes and diesel engines was used to hydrate them. Those crops were sold in the area and in Las Vegas. A few years after Gordon and Billie Bettles had acquired the farm, their daughter and son-in-law, M. P. Glessner, bought five acres of land near the T&T Ranch. Their plot of land was situated at the crossing of the current SR 373 and Mecca Road. The Glessners built their house on the land in the middle of the 1950s, but Gordon and Billie Bettles obtained the land and the house thereafter. They moved to the house and started the construction of another building nearby.

However, Gordon and Billie Bettles did not meet the terms of the option and were forced to give up the ownership of the option. Hank Records bought the option on the T&T Ranch in 1956. Although they did not own the option anymore, the Bettles family continued to inhabit the T&T Ranch until 1964. During that year, Records had to transfer the ownership of the farm back to the Pacific Coast Borax Company, because he was declared bankrupt. As a favor, the Bettles family was given 40 acres of the land in 1964. The 5 original parcels including the 40 acre piece are now all family owned and currently grow alfalfa, as well as host a 100MW solar farm operated by EDPR.
