= Leeland, Nevada =

Leeland
- Ghost town
- Location in Nevada
- Coordinates: 36°35′10″N 116°35′10″W
- Country: United States
- State: Nevada
- Counties: Nye
- Founded: 1906
- Elevation: 2,380 ft (730 m)

Population
  - Total: 0
- GNIS feature ID: 856067

Leeland is a former railway hamlet in the Amargosa Valley in Nye County, Nevada. A year after its founding in 1906, a railway station was opened. Raw materials from the nearby Californian mining village Lee were brought to Leeland to be transported by train.

== History ==
Leeland was founded in 1906 at the 144-mile marker of the Tonopah and Tidewater Railroad, that started its operations that same year. On October 15 of the next year, a railway station was opened in Leeland and a regular train service for both passengers and cargo was created. The station building itself, that had three rooms, was opened a week later, as well as an office of Wells Fargo. Both structures had dirt floors and lacked electricity and plumbing. The railway station was the first station on the Tonopah and Tidewater Railroad in Nevada across the border with California. According to an interview with Deke Lowe, the foreman of the railway section – most of the time an Anglo-American – lived with his family in a house in Leeland. Lowe said that the foreman's auxiliaries, who were primarily of Mexican origin, lived with their families in one-room residences. Most of the auxiliaries did not speak English and left Leeland within a year after their arrival.

Leeland's station was used for the transportation of raw materials that were brought in from the mining settlement Lee, that was situated about 5 miles (8 kilometres) west of Leeland in California. Lee boomed in 1906. A stage line between the two settlements was established by C.E. Johnson. As Lee grew, Leeland grew with it: Leeland had six or seven inhabitants in 1909 and 25 by 1911. On November 23, 1911, a post office was established with George Railton as postmaster. Leeland had its heyday the next year and started to shrink afterwards, because Lee's economy collapsed. Leeland's post office shut down on November 14, 1914. By then, the place was still a water stop of the railway, but it was gradually forgotten. Leeland's railway station continued to exist until April 1931, when the station and other facilities were burned down by Jack Behresin, who committed suicide afterwards. Eventually, the tracks of the Tonopah and Tidewater Railroad were removed in the early 1940s. Nothing of the railway hamlet remains.

== Farming ==
The area in the Amargosa Valley around Leeland was suitable for agriculture, since enough ground water, that could be easily pumped to the surface by wells, was available. In Leeland itself, employees of the Tonopah and Tidewater Railroad grew vegetables and grains in their backyards on a small scale. The railway company wanted to increase its profit and reasoned that if homesteaders would settle in the Amargosa Valley they would transport their products by train. Farms had already been established in some other nearby places, like Ash Meadows and the Pahrump Valley. In 1914 and 1915, officials of the railway company visited the area to investigate the agricultural possibilities. In order to attract homesteaders, the Tonopah and Tidewater Railroad created a 10-acre demonstration farm and dairy, that showed the agricultural possibilities of the area. The farm, that was named the T&T Ranch, was situated 5.5 miles (9 kilometres) southeast of Leeland.

However, the T&T Ranch did not attract any homesteaders. Potential settlers were discouraged by the Homestead Act, that among other things required homesteaders to develop a surface water supply sufficient for the cultivation of their land. In 1919, the Pittman Underground Water Act was passed by Congress. It was sponsored by Nevada Senator Key Pittman, and pushed for by the Tonopah and Tidewater Railroad. The law aimed to boost the reclamation of specific areas in Nevada with dry land and allowed the Secretary of the Interior to issue permits, that allowed the receivers to drill wells. A receiver of a permit could obtain 160 acres of land if enough water to support at least a twenty-acre crop field was found and developed within two years.

After the bill was passed, five officials of Pacific Coast Borax Company, the company that owned the Tonopah and Tidewater Railroad, took advantage of it. Their five homesteads were situated around the T&T Ranch and they formed a contiguous block. In 1927, the five claims were patented and the document was signed by President Calvin Coolidge. The homesteaders founded the Leeland Water and Land Company, a holding company, afterwards. Not long thereafter, the owners handed the rights of the land over to the Pacific Coast Borax Company. The T&T Ranch operated until the 1940s, when it was vacated, because the Tonopah and Tidewater Railroad stopped existing. The farms had not been very successful. Cruz Venstrom suggested in a 1939 report that the unsuccessfulness of agriculture in southern Nevada was due to the distance between the farmers and their markets. The farming business in the Amargosa Valley outside of Ash Meadows took off a decade after the railway was closed. The T&T Ranch remained abandoned until 1946, when Gordon and Billie Bettles acquired it. They ran the demonstration farm until 1964.
