= BedRoc Limited, LLC v. United States =

- Supreme Court of the United States

Argued January 20, 2004 Decided March 31, 2004
- Full case name: Bedroc Limited, LLC, and Western Elite, Inc., Petitioners v. United States et al.
- Docket no.: 02-1593
- Citations: 541 U.S. 176 (more) 124 S. Ct. 1587; 158 L. Ed. 2d 338
- Argument: Oral argument
- Opinion announcement: Opinion announcement

Case history
- Prior: 50 F. Supp. 2d 1001 (D. Nev. 1999); affirmed, 314 F.3d 1080 (9th Cir. 2002); cert. granted, 539 U.S. 986 (2003).

Holding
- Gravel and sand are not "valuable minerals" reserved to the U.S. Government under the Pittman Underground Water Act. United States Court of Appeals for the Ninth Circuit reversed.

Court membership
- Chief Justice William Rehnquist Associate Justices John P. Stevens · Sandra Day O'Connor; Antonin Scalia · Anthony Kennedy; David Souter · Clarence Thomas; Ruth Bader Ginsburg · Stephen Breyer

Case opinions
- Plurality: Rehnquist, joined by O’Connor, Scalia, Kennedy
- Concurrence: Thomas (in judgment), joined by Breyer
- Dissent: Stevens, joined by Souter, Ginsburg

Laws applied
- Pittman Underground Water Act

BedRoc Limited, LLC v. United States, 541 U.S. 176 (2004), is a United States Supreme Court case in which the Court decided sand and gravel are not "valuable minerals" reserved to the United States Government under the Pittman Underground Water Act of 1919. The Court sided in a 6–3 decision with the petitioner, BedRoc Limited, and reversed the decision of the Ninth Circuit Court. BedRoc Limited had removed sand and gravel from lands obtained under the Pittman Act, and the United States, the respondent, argued those were reserved to the U.S. Government under that law.

William Rehnquist wrote the majority opinion, that relied on a textualist approach, and was joined by three justices. He argued sand and gravel were not considered "valuable minerals" in Nevada when the Pittman Act was passed in 1919. A concurring opinion was written by Clarence Thomas, and joined by another justice. Two justices joined John P. Stevens' dissenting opinion, that relied on legislative history and a previous decision of the Supreme Court.

== Background ==
In 1940, Newton and Mabel Butler patented 560 acres (230 ha) of land under the Pittman Underground Water Act (36.977°N 114.984°W). The land was situated in Lincoln County, Nevada, 65 miles (105 km) north of Las Vegas. A tenant started extracting sand and gravel in the early 1990s. The land was sold to Earl Williams in 1993, and he continued to remove sand and gravel from the land. That same year, Williams received two trespass notices from the Bureau of Land Management (BLM), that argued he was removing mineral materials from public lands. Williams challenged the notices, but the BLM ruled that the government held a reservation to the "valuable minerals" on the land.

In 1995, BedRoc Limited, LLC bought the land, and continued to remove sand and gravel under an interim agreement with the Department of the Interior. Under the agreement, BedRoc Limited had to place money in escrow from the sale of each cubic yard of sand and gravel that the company removed, pending a final resolution. A year later, BedRoc Limited transferred 40 acres (16 ha) of the land to Western Elite, Inc. The Interior Board of Land Appeals upheld the decision by the BLM in 1997, relying on the legislative history of the Pittman Act and on Congress' intent.

Subsequently, BedRoc Limited filed an action to quiet title in the United States District Court of Nevada. BedRoc Limited demanded ownership of the sand and gravel, while the American government asked for trespass damages. On May 24, 1999, Justice Philip Martin Pro of the Court decided that sand and gravel were "valuable minerals" reserved to the American government under the Pittman Act. The Court asked itself whether sand and gravel were minerals, whether they were valuable, and whether the "nonmineral" certification of the Pittman Act had any influence. The Court argued sand and gravel were minerals, and decided they were valuable under the Pittman Act based on Congress' intent and on debates. Besides, the Court argued lands containing minerals could be classified as nonmineral.

BedRoc Limited appealed to the Ninth Circuit Court, and Western Elite was added as a plaintiff. The three-judge panel consisting of Judges Michael Daly Hawkins, Susan P. Graber, and Richard C. Tallman argued on November 7, 2002, and affirmed the decision by the District Court. The opinion was written by Graber. After concluding the language of the Pittman Act itself was ambiguous, the Court deserted to the purpose of the law and to the legislative history. The Ninth Circuit Court decided sand and gravel were "valuable minerals" reserved to the United States, because there was a market for sand and gravel when the Pittman Act was enacted, and because Congress intended the reservation of the Pittman Act to be the same as the mineral reservation of the Stock-Raising Homestead Act. The Court said "the mineral reservation [was] to be read broadly in the light of the agricultural purpose [of the law]". BedRoc argued a site-specific analysis had to be used to determine whether sand and gravel were valuable, but the Court disagreed.

The Supreme Court granted certiorari on September 30, 2003, and the oral argument occurred on January 20 of the following year. During the argument, BedRoc Limited was represented by R. Timothy McCrum, while the United States Government was represented by Thomas L. Sansonetti. All justices asked questions or made remarks except for Clarence Thomas.

== Legal background ==
The patent to the land was granted under the Pittman Underground Water Act, that went into effect in 1919. Under that law, the Secretary of the Interior could grant patents to people who established a water supply. It only applied to Nevada. The eighth section of the Pittman Act stated that each patent contained "a reservation to the United States of all the coal and other valuable minerals in the lands" and the right for the government to "prospect for, mine and remove the same" under the laws in force during a disposal of the minerals.

The Supreme Court cited Watt v. Western Nuclear, Inc., a 1983 Supreme Court decision, in which the Court interpreted the mineral reservation of the Stock-Raising Homestead Act (SRHA), that was enacted in 1916. The Supreme Court decided gravel was a mineral reserved to the government under the SRHA. The Court looked at whether gravel was part of the surface estate, which belongs to the patentee, or to the mineral estate, which belongs to the government. It decided substances are reserved to the government when they are mineral in character, can be removed from the soil, can be used for commercial purposes, and when there is no reason for the substance to be included in the surface estate. The mineral reservation of the SRHA differs from that of the Pittman Act, as the SRHA does not include the word "valuable".

== Opinion of the court ==
The Court decided on March 31, 2004, and delivered three opinions. The majority opinion was supported by four justices, the concurring opinion by two, and the dissenting opinion by three. The majority argued sand and gravel were not valuable when the law was passed in 1919 according to common sense, while the dissenting opinion said the emphasis on the word "valuable" was unjust, and said it was Congress' intent to include sand and gravel in the reservation. The concurring opinion acknowledged the emphasis on valuable was unjust, while saying the word "mineral" itself includes the requirement of commercial purpose as was decided in Watt v. Western Nuclear, Inc.

=== Majority opinion ===
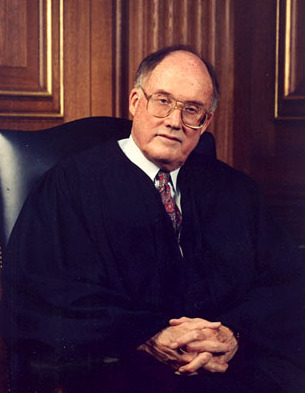
Chief Justice William Rehnquist

The majority opinion was written by Chief Justice William Rehnquist, and joined by Justices Sandra Day O'Connor, Antonin Scalia, and Anthony Kennedy. Adopting a textualist approach, the majority held that sand and gravel were not "valuable minerals" reserved to the government. The Court said it would not extend its decision in Watt v. Western Nuclear, Inc. to say that sand and gravel are valuable minerals. According to the majority, the Court had to focus on the meaning of the law when it was enacted, and it asked itself "whether the sand and gravel found in Nevada were commonly regarded as "valuable minerals" in 1919". According to the majority, common sense said no, as sand and gravel were abundant, had no intrinsic value, and were commercially worthless in Nevada in 1919. The Court said sand and gravel could not be mistaken for "valuable minerals" no matter if they would be regarded as minerals.

Furthermore, the Pittman Underground Water Act stated the disposal had to happen "in accordance with the provisions of the coal and mineral land laws in force at the time of such disposal". The Court said Congress was referring to the General Mining Act of 1872, that stated "all valuable mineral deposits in lands belonging to the United States" were "free and open to exploration and purchase". The majority said it was undeniable that "common sand and gravel could not constitute a locatable "valuable mineral deposit" under the General Mining Act".

The majority did not consider the legislative history as it did in Watt v. Western Nuclear, Inc., as the Pittman Act explicitly used the word "valuable" in contrast to the Stock-Raising Homestead Act (SRHA). Because of the absence of the word "valuable" in the SRHA, the Court had to speculate about Congress' intent in Watt v. Western Nuclear, Inc. Furthermore, by deciding in favor of the plaintiff, the Court left its principle that "land grants are construed favorably to the Government... and if there are doubts they are reserved for the Government, not against it", which it called an "established rule" in Wat v. Western Nuclear, Inc.

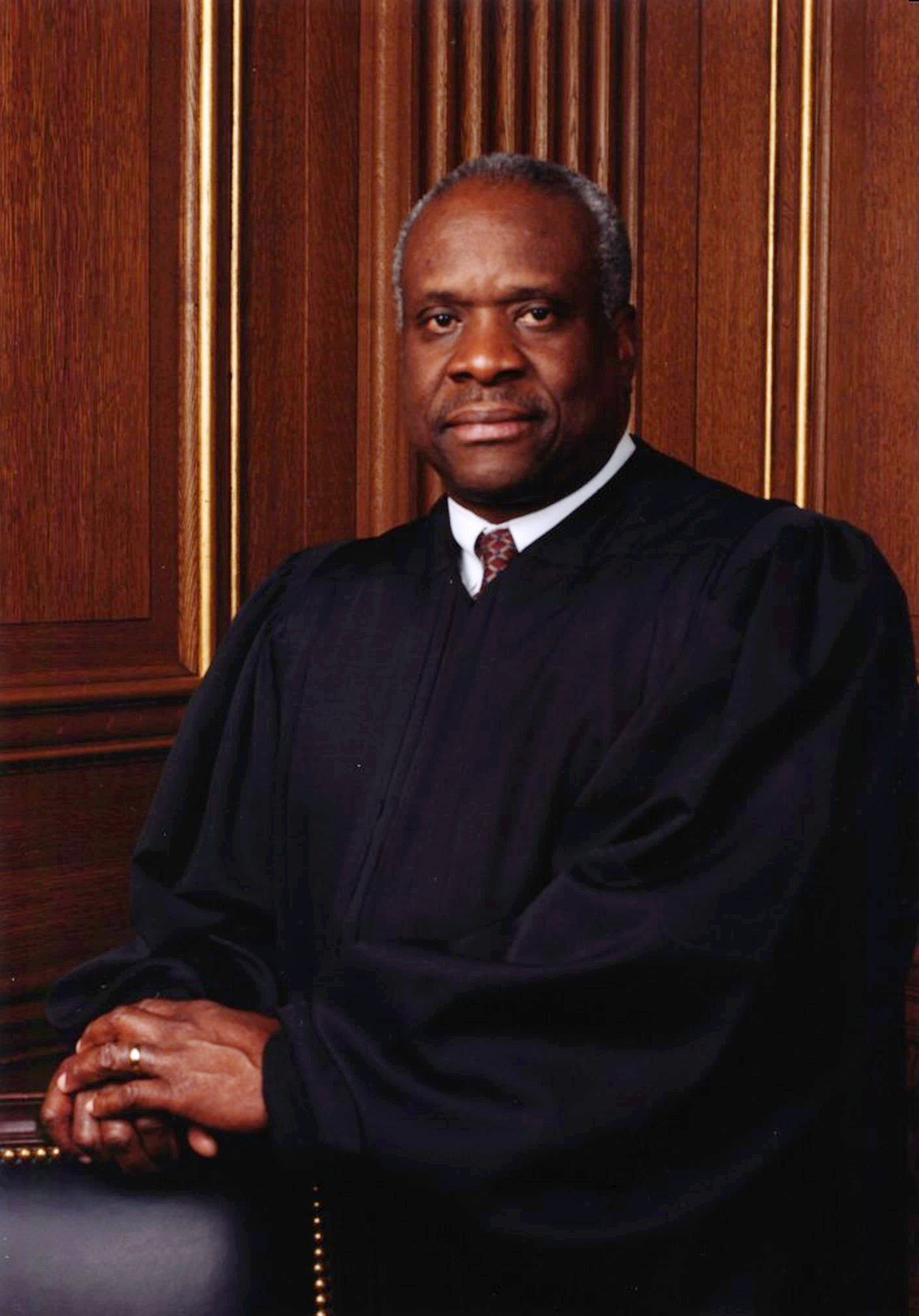
Justice Clarence Thomas

=== Concurring opinion ===
Justice Clarence Thomas wrote a concurring opinion, that was joined by Justice Stephen Breyer. Thomas agreed with the dissenting opinion that no distinction could be made between the mineral reservation in the Pittman Underground Water Act and in the Stock-Raising Homestead Act (SRHA). He, however, argued that sand and gravel are not part of the mineral reservations of both laws, disagreeing with Watt v. Western Nuclear, Inc.

Thomas argued the emphasis the majority lays on the word "valuable" was unjust, as the Pittman Act uses "valuable minerals" and "minerals" interchangeably. Thomas said both phrases therefore were meant as synonymous. Moreover, Thomas said if "valuable" was the source of the requirement that the minerals should have commercial worth, that would be inconsistent with Watt v. Western Nuclear, Inc., because that decision said that a substance was a mineral when it could be used for commercial purposes. Thomas, in his opinion, disagreed with the conclusion of Watt v. Western Nuclear, Inc. He did not agree that sand and gravel are minerals under the SRHA only because, hypothetically, "they could have been used for commercial purposes," when the SRHA was passed. Thomas agreed with the majority opinion that according to common sense and the statutory context sand and gravel could not be used for commercial purposes when the Pittman Act was passed in 1919. Thomas wrote in his opinion that he did not advocate overruling Watt v. Western Nuclear, Inc. despite disagreeing with the decision.

=== Dissenting opinion ===
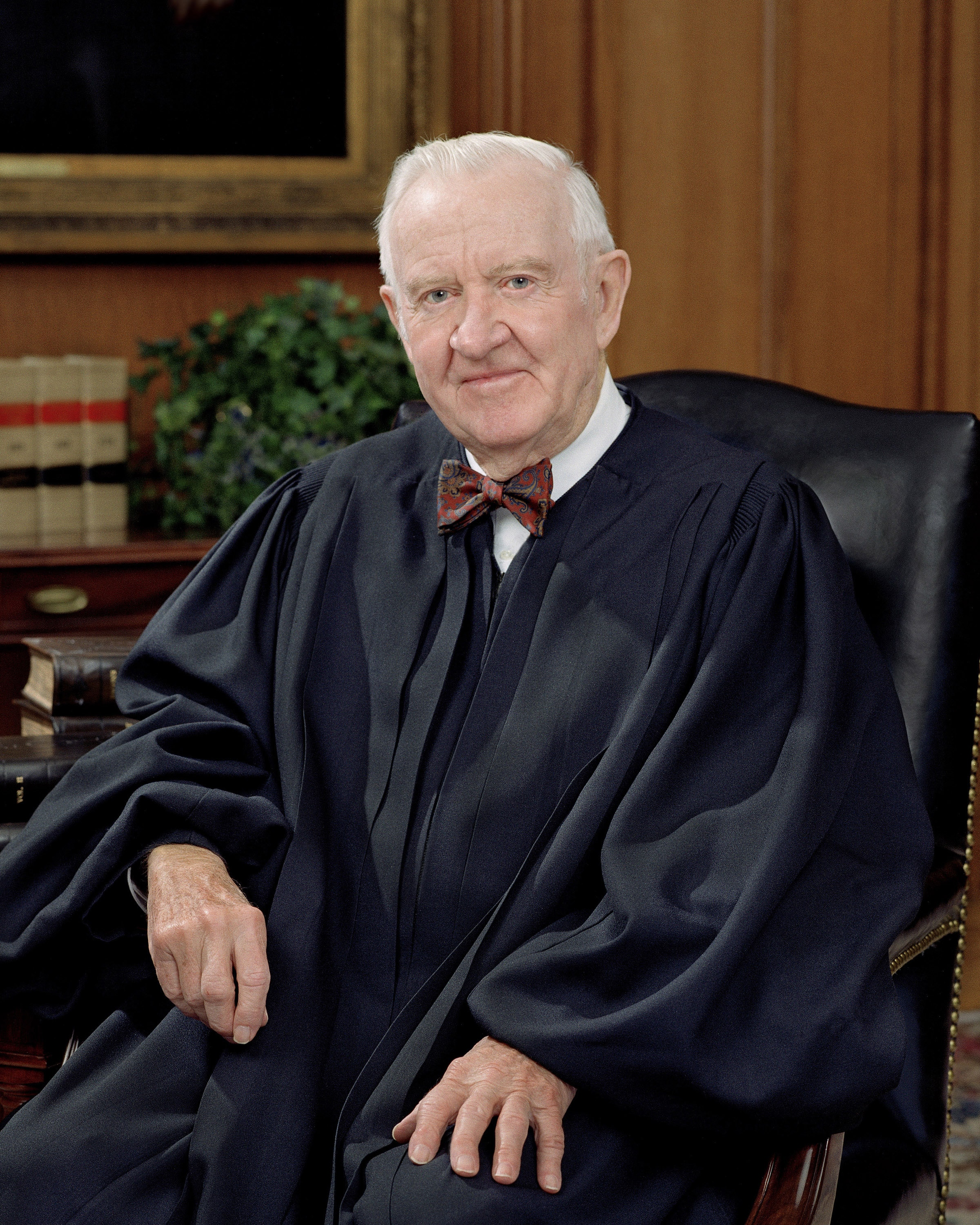
Justice John P. Stevens

Justice John P. Stevens wrote a dissenting opinion, that was joined by Justices David Souter and Ruth Bader Ginsburg. Stevens said the majority opinion depended entirely on the word "valuable", and he rejected this emphasis. He said the reservation of the Pittman Underground Water Act was meant to be the same as that of the Stock-Raising Homestead Act (SRHA).

Stevens called it highly unlikely that Congress meant to make a distinction between the reservation of the Pittman Act and that of the SRHA, as it would be illogical that Congress would have wanted a reservation to the sand and gravel in lands covered by the SRHA, but not to the sand and gravel in lands covered by the Pittman Act. Besides, Stevens referred to a House Committee Report which said section 8 of the Pittman Act contained the same reservation of minerals as the SRHA. Stevens criticized the majority opinion for ignoring the fact that Watt v. Western Nuclear, Inc. already stated that a substance must be valuable to be a mineral. Moreover, he said "valuable minerals" and "minerals" were meant to be synonymous, as the Pittman Act contains the phrase "valuable minerals" twice and the words "minerals" and "mineral" without the word "valuable" eight times.

Stevens did not rule out the possibility that the majority opinion in Watt v. Western Nuclear, Inc. misinterpreted Congress' intention, but he said there was no reason to choose another assessment of the Congress' intention over the old one. Stevens criticized the majority opinion for not using legislative history in order to find the Congress' original intent, which could result into decisions based on personal preference. The majority argued looking at the legislative history was unnecessary because of the clear language of the Pittman Act.
