= F. Hoffmann-La Roche Ltd. v. Empagran S.A. =

- Supreme Court of the United States

Decided June 14, 2004
- Full case name: F. Hoffmann-La Roche Ltd. v. Empagran S.A.
- Citations: 542 U.S. 155 (more)

Holding
- Where price-fixing conduct significantly and adversely affects both customers outside and within the United States but the adverse foreign effect is independent of any adverse domestic effect, neither the FTAIA exception nor the Sherman Act applies to a claim based solely on the foreign effect.

Court membership
- Chief Justice William Rehnquist Associate Justices John P. Stevens · Sandra Day O'Connor; Antonin Scalia · Anthony Kennedy; David Souter · Clarence Thomas; Ruth Bader Ginsburg · Stephen Breyer

Case opinions
- Majority: Breyer, joined by Rehnquist, Stevens, Kennedy, Souter, Ginsburg
- Concurrence: Scalia, joined by Thomas
- O’Connor, took no part in the consideration or decision of the case.

Laws applied
- Foreign Trade Antitrust Improvements Act of 1982; Sherman Act

F. Hoffmann-La Roche Ltd. v. Empagran S.A., 542 U.S. 155 (2004), was a United States Supreme Court case in which the court held that where price-fixing conduct significantly and adversely affects both customers outside and within the United States but the adverse foreign effect is independent of any adverse domestic effect, neither the FTAIA exception nor the Sherman Act applies to a claim based solely on the foreign effect.

== Background ==
The Foreign Trade Antitrust Improvements Act of 1982 (FTAIA) provides that the Sherman Act "shall not apply to conduct involving trade or commerce... with foreign nations" in 15 U.S.C. §6a. However, it creates exceptions for conduct that significantly harms imports, domestic commerce, or American exporters. In this case, vitamin purchasers filed a class action alleging that vitamin manufacturers and distributors had engaged in a price-fixing conspiracy, raising vitamin prices in the United States and foreign countries, in violation of the Sherman and Clayton Acts.

The manufacturers (including Roche) moved to dismiss the suit as to the foreign purchasers (including Empagran), foreign companies located abroad, who had purchased vitamins only outside United States commerce. In dismissing Empagran's claims, the federal District Court applied the FTAIA and found none of its exceptions applicable. The Court of Appeals for the D.C. Circuit reversed, concluding that the FTAIA's exclusionary rule applied, but so did its exception for conduct that has a "direct, substantial and reasonably foreseeable effect" on domestic commerce that "gives rise to a [Sherman Act] claim." Assuming that the foreign effect, i.e., higher foreign prices, was independent of the domestic effect, i.e., higher domestic prices, the court nonetheless concluded that the act's text, legislative history, and policy goal of deterring harmful price-fixing activity made the lack of connection between the two effects inconsequential.

The Supreme Court granted certiorari.

== Opinion of the court ==
The Supreme Court issued an opinion on June 14, 2004. The court asked why United States law ought to supplant the law of other countries.

== Later developments ==
Prior to the Empagran decision, the United States's somewhat liberal rules for litigation made it a very attractive jurisdiction for international antitrust litigation. After this decision, courts in the United States started hearing fewer cases based on foreign conduct than they did previously. This was in stark contrast to other jurisdictions, such as the European Union, that dogmatically apply their anti-competition rules regardless of where the conduct occurred.
