= Lees Camp =

Lees Camp or Lee's Camp may refer to:

- Lee, California
- Lees Camp, Oregon
