= United States v. Flores-Montano =

- Supreme Court of the United States

Argued February 25, 2004 Decided March 30, 2004
- Full case name: United States of America v. Manuel Flores-Montano
- Docket no.: 02-1794
- Citations: 541 U.S. 149 (more) 124 S. Ct. 1582; 158 L. Ed. 2d 311; 2004 U.S. LEXIS 2548; 72 U.S.L.W. 4263; 17 Fla. L. Weekly Fed. S 207
- Argument: Oral argument

Case history
- Prior: Motion to suppress granted by the United States District Court for the Southern District of California and affirmed by the Ninth Circuit in an unpublished opinion; cert. granted, 540 U.S. 945 (2003).
- Subsequent: On remand at, Remanded by United States v. Flores-Montano, 377 F.3d 1105, 2004 U.S. App. LEXIS 15999 (9th Cir., Aug. 4, 2004)

Holding
- At the international border, the Fourth Amendment does not require reasonable suspicion for customs agents to remove the gas tank from a vehicle entering the United States in order to check for drugs.

Court membership
- Chief Justice William Rehnquist Associate Justices John P. Stevens · Sandra Day O'Connor; Antonin Scalia · Anthony Kennedy; David Souter · Clarence Thomas; Ruth Bader Ginsburg · Stephen Breyer

Case opinions
- Majority: Rehnquist, joined by unanimous
- Concurrence: Breyer

Laws applied
- U.S. Const. amend. IV

United States v. Flores-Montano, 541 U.S. 149 (2004), was a United States Supreme Court case in which the Court held that customs agents may remove the gas tank from a vehicle crossing the international border in an effort to look for contraband.

== Background ==
Flores-Montano ("Flores") was driving a 1987 Ford Taurus station wagon as he attempted to enter the United States through the port of entry at Otay Mesa, California. A customs inspector referred the vehicle to secondary inspection, where a second inspector tapped the gas tank and noticed it sounded solid. The second inspector summoned a mechanic who, less than half an hour later, arrived and removed the gas tank from the car. The mechanic then removed an access plate from the tank and found 37 kilograms of marijuana. The process of removing the gas tank took between 15 and 25 minutes.

Flores was indicted in the United States District Court for the Southern District of California for importing marijuana into the United States and for possession of marijuana with intent to distribute it. Relying on Ninth Circuit precedent in effect at the time requiring reasonable suspicion for removal of a gas tank, Flores filed a motion to suppress the marijuana found in his car. Although the Government urged the district court to ignore that precedent, the district court declined to do so and granted Flores's suppression motion. The Ninth Circuit summarily affirmed the granting of the suppression motion, and the Government asked the Supreme Court to review the case.

== Opinion of the Court ==
In United States v. Montoya de Hernandez, 473 U.S. 531 (1985), the Court had said, "Routine searches of the persons and effects of entrants are not subject to any requirement of reasonable suspicion, probable cause, or warrant." The Ninth Circuit interpreted this language to mean that reasonable suspicion was required when government agents sought to conduct an "intrusive" search at the border, including searches involving the removal and dismantling of gas tanks. The Supreme Court rejected this reasoning because "the reasons that might support a requirement of some level of suspicion in the case of highly intrusive searches of the person — dignity and privacy interests of the person being searched — simply do not carry over to vehicles." Accordingly, the Supreme Court found the Ninth Circuit's rule to be inconsistent with the meaning of "reasonableness" under the Fourth Amendment.

The Court's ruling in this case rests on the fact that the search at issue in this case took place at the international border. "The Government's interest in preventing the entry of unwanted persons and effects is at its zenith at the international border." In light of the Government's interest in protecting its sovereignty and territorial integrity, "searches made at the border... are reasonable simply by virtue of the fact that they occur at the border." Indeed, the statute authorizing the search in this case derived ultimately from a statute first passed in 1789. Smugglers frequently attempt to penetrate the border, and using vehicle gas tanks is a common tactic. In the five and a half years preceding the decision in this case, 18,788 drug seizures had occurred at the ports of entry in southern California, and of those involving vehicles, 4,619, or 25%, were from gas tanks. In addition, instances of persons smuggled in and around gas tank compartments are discovered at the ports of entry of San Ysidro and Otay Mesa about once ever 10 days.

Flores argued he had an expectation of privacy in his gas tank. But the Court pointed out that a reasonable expectation of privacy is diminished at the international border. "It is difficult to imagine how the search of a gas tank, which should be solely a repository for fuel, could be more of an invasion of privacy than the search of the automobile's passenger compartment." Flores also pointed to the potential of a search like the one at issue in this case to cause damage to the vehicle. But the Court replied that the searches are not truly destructive, and that there was not a single accident among the "many thousands of gas tank disassemblies that have occurred at the border." A gas tank search is a brief procedure that can easily be reversed without damaging the vehicle, and if by chance the vehicle were damaged in the process, the owner could sue for damages.

== See also ==
- Border search exception to the Fourth Amendment warrant requirement.
- List of United States Supreme Court cases, volume 541
- List of United States Supreme Court cases
