= List of United States Supreme Court cases, volume 541 =

This is a list of all the United States Supreme Court cases from volume 541 of the United States Reports:

Case name	Citation	Date decided
Yates Profit Sharing Plan v. Hendon	541 U.S. 1	2004
The working owner of a business may qualify as a "participant" in a pension plan covered by ERISA and may participate on equal terms with other plan participants.
Baldwin v. Reese	541 U.S. 27	2004
In order to "fairly present" a federal claim to a state court while seeking post-conviction relief, the petitioner must explicitly say that their claim is based on federal law within their petition. If the state court must read any other document, then the claim is not fairly presented. If the petitioner does not do so, the federal claim is not preserved and cannot be raised in federal court.
Crawford v. Washington	541 U.S. 36	2004
Iowa v. Tovar	541 U.S. 77	2004
S. Fla. Water Management Dist. v. Miccosukee Tribe	541 U.S. 95	2004
United States v. Galletti	541 U.S. 114	2004
The proper tax assessment against a partnership suffices to extend the statute of limitations to collect the a in a judicial proceeding from the general partners who are liable for the payment of the partnership's debts.
Nixon v. Mo. Municipal League	541 U.S. 125	2004
United States v. Flores-Montano	541 U.S. 149	2004
Nat'l Archives & Records Admin. v. Favish	541 U.S. 157	2004
Surviving family members can assert their right to personal privacy with respect to their close relative’s death-scene images for the purposes of an exception to the release of those images under FOIA.
BedRoc Limited, LLC v. United States	541 U.S. 176	2004
United States v. Lara	541 U.S. 193	2004
Household Credit Services, Inc. v. Pfennig	541 U.S. 232	2004
Engine Mfrs. Assn. v. S. Coast Air Quality Management Dist.	541 U.S. 246	2004
A local government agency's anti-pollution rules do not escape federal pre-emption just because they address the purchase of vehicles when the federal law references manufacture or sale.
Vieth v. Jubelirer	541 U.S. 267	2004
Jones v. R R. Donnelley & Sons Co.	541 U.S. 369	2004
Dretke v. Haley	541 U.S. 386	2004
A federal court faced with allegations of actual innocence, whether of the sentence or of the crime charged, must first address all nondefaulted claims for comparable relief and other grounds for cause to excuse the procedural default.
Scarborough v. Principi	541 U.S. 401	2004
Johnson v. California	541 U.S. 428	2004
Middleton v. McNeil	541 U.S. 433	2004
Tenn. Student Assistance Corp. v. Hood	541 U.S. 440	2004
A Bankruptcy Court's discharge of a student-loan debt does not implicate a state's Eleventh Amendment immunity.
Till v. SCS Credit Corp.	541 U.S. 465	2004
Tennessee v. Lane	541 U.S. 509	2004
Grupo Dataflux v. Atlas Global Group, L.P.	541 U.S. 567	2004
A party’s postfiling change in citizenship cannot cure a lack of subject-matter jurisdiction that existed at the time of filing in a diversity action.
Sabri v. United States	541 U.S. 600	2004
Under the Necessary and Proper Clause, a law that has no clear connection between federal funding and the conduct that it bans is not presumed to be unconstitutional.
Thornton v. United States	541 U.S. 615	2004
Nelson v. Campbell	541 U.S. 637	2004
Yarborough v. Alvarado	541 U.S. 652	2004
Republic of Austria v. Altmann	541 U.S. 677	2004
Cent. Laborers' Pension Fund v. Heinz	541 U.S. 739	2004
Dept. of Transp. v. Public Citizen	541 U.S. 752	2004
City of Littleton v. Z.J. Gifts D-4, L L.C.	541 U.S. 774	2004
