= Iowa v. Tovar =

- Supreme Court of the United States

Argued January 21, 2004 Decided March 8, 2004
- Full case name: Iowa v. Tovar
- Docket no.: 02-1541
- Citations: 541 U.S. 77 (more) 124 S. Ct. 1379
- Argument: Oral argument

Case history
- Prior: first OWI conviction: 1996 second OWI: 1998 third OWI indictment: 2000; motion to reduce the charges denied, 2001; conviction, 2001; affirmed (Iowa Court of Appeals); reversed, 656 N.W.2d 112 (Iowa 2003); certiorari granted, 539 U.S. 987 (2003)

Holding
- A guilty plea by a pro se defendant may be accepted, and their right to counsel validly waived, if 1) they are informed of the nature of the charges against them, of their right to be counseled regarding their plea, and of the range of allowable punishments, taking into account 2) the defendant's education or sophistication and the complex or easily grasped nature of the charge.

Court membership
- Chief Justice William Rehnquist Associate Justices John P. Stevens · Sandra Day O'Connor; Antonin Scalia · Anthony Kennedy; David Souter · Clarence Thomas; Ruth Bader Ginsburg · Stephen Breyer

Case opinion
- Majority: Ginsburg, joined unanimously

Laws applied
- U.S. Const. amend. VI

Iowa v. Tovar, 541 U.S. 77 (2004), was a unanimous decision of the Supreme Court of the United States that clarified how well-informed a defendant had to be to waive their right to counsel under the Sixth Amendment. The defendant in this case had waived his right to counsel and pled guilty to drunk driving, and then had been convicted of drunk driving twice more, with sentences increasing as his convictions piled up. He argued that the judge in the first case had not explained that multiple drunk driving convictions would lead to more severe sentences, so his waiver of counsel had been invalid. The Supreme Court disagreed, saying that the judge's warnings had been adequate, and the defendants' waiver was "knowing, voluntary, and intelligent."

== Background ==
=== Legal background ===
The assistance of counsel clause of the Sixth Amendment to the United States Constitution generally guarantees that defendants have a right to be represented by an attorney during criminal proceedings. This is not mandatory, however, and defendants also have the right to represent themselves (known as litigating pro se). When a defendant chooses to proceed pro se, they are waiving their right to an attorney, and will not be able to claim later (e.g. on appeal) that the trial was unconstitutional because their right to counsel was violated. Because having an attorney can make an enormous difference during a trial, the Supreme Court decided in Faretta v. California in 1975 that pro se defendants had to be warned of the "dangers and disadvantages of self-representation."

=== Prior litigation ===
==== First OWI ====
In 1996, Felipe Tovar (then a college student in Ames, Iowa) was charged with operating while intoxicated (OWI). At his arraignment, he did not have a lawyer, and the judge confirmed with him that he wanted to represent himself during the hearing. Tovar entered a guilty plea, and the judge went through a plea colloquy with him, following Iowa's Rules of Criminal Procedure. The judge explained that (among other things), not only was Tovar giving up his right to a trial, but also a right to have an attorney at that trial, and "That attorney could help you select a jury, question and cross-examine the State's witnesses, present evidence, if any, in your behalf, and make arguments to the judge and jury on your behalf." He also reviewed the other trial-related rights that Tovar would be waiving, and asked Tovar to verify that he still wanted to plead guilty. Tovar did so. After reviewing the factual basis for the charges, the judge accepted Tovar's guilty plea. At the sentencing hearing, Tovar appeared pro se again, and the judge went through another colloquy to make sure that Tovar did not want a lawyer and understood the risks. Tovar was sentenced to two days in jail and a $500 fine, plus fees (as well as a fine of $250 plus fees for driving himself to the courthouse, even though his license had been suspended).

==== Second and third OWI ====
Tovar was charged for OWI again in 1998, and a third time in 2000. He was represented by attorney for both of these charges; in 1998 he pled guilty, and in 2000 he pled not guilty. Under Iowa law, the first OWI was a serious misdemeanor, the second was an aggravated misdemeanor, and the third was a felony. In 2001, Tovar's attorney filed a motion that the charge should be reduced, arguing that his waiver of counsel in 1996 had been invalid. The trial court denied the motion, saying:

Where the offense is readily understood by laypersons and the penalty is not unduly severe, the duty of inquiry which is imposed upon the court is only that which is required to assure an awareness of [the] right to counsel and a willingness to proceed without counsel in the face of such awareness.

After Tovar was convicted and sentenced, he appealed the motion.

==== Appeal ====
The Iowa Court of Appeals affirmed. However, the Iowa Supreme Court reversed, saying Tovar's waiver in 1996 of his right to counsel was not "knowing and intelligent." Although the U.S. Supreme Court had not yet explicitly said what standard to apply for this situation, the Iowa Supreme Court noted that in Brady v. United States, a guilty plea was held constitutionally valid because it was "voluntary," "knowing," and "intelligent" (taking the circumstances into account), and in Patterson v. Illinois it had been held that the importance of the right to counsel varied depending on the stage and circumstances of litigation. Moreover, the court in Patterson had pointed out two key issues: "whether the accused was 'made sufficiently aware of his right to have counsel present' at the proceeding and 'the possible consequences of a decision to forgo the aid of counsel.' " With this in mind, the Iowa Supreme Court ruled that the trial judge's colloquy had been insufficient, and remanded the case for a new trial:

Not only was there an absence of any dialogue concerning the value of having an attorney when pleading guilty, there was no colloquy with Tovar that alerted him to the dangers and disadvantages of entering a guilty plea without the advice of counsel. Importantly, the court did not warn Tovar that he might have legal defenses to the charge that he, as a layperson, would not recognize.

— State v. Tovar, 656 N.W.2d at 120 (Justice Marsha Ternus, writing for the court)

== Decision of the Supreme Court ==
The U.S. Supreme Court unanimously reversed the Iowa Supreme Court and reinstated Tovar's conviction. Justice Ginsburg, writing for the court, said that the Sixth Amendment did not require colloquies as extensive as the Iowa court had held. A defendant had to be informed of "the nature of the charges against him, of his right to be counseled regarding his plea, and of the range of allowable punishments attendant upon the entry of a guilty plea," but that was all.

An arraignment where a defendant might enter a guilty plea was certainly a "critical stage" of litigation, and thus there was a right to an attorney then. The Court declined to decide on a "formula or script" for plea colloquies, however, because the amount of information necessary for "voluntary, knowing, and intelligent" waiver would vary for different defendants and circumstances; the Court noted that "the defendant's education or sophistication, the complex or easily grasped nature of the charge, and the stage of the proceeding" were all factors. The ruling of the Iowa Supreme Court was simply too "rigid", as it did not take such factors into account. It also might be counterproductive:

In a case so straightforward, the United States as amicus curiae suggests, the admonitions at issue might confuse or mislead a defendant more than they would inform him: The warnings the Iowa Supreme Court declared mandatory might be misconstrued as a veiled suggestion that a meritorious defense exists or that the defendant could plead to a lesser charge, when neither prospect is a realistic one.

— Iowa v. Tovar, 541 U.S. at 93 (Justice Ginsburg, writing for the court)

Ginsburg also noted that Tovar's motion was a collateral attack (meaning that Tovar was attacking a prior ruling because it was relevant to an ongoing case), and as such the burden of proof was on him. Tovar had not done much to argue that he had actually been unaware of his rights in 1996; he had only argued that he might have been unaware, since the judge's colloquy had not been more extensive. In the Court's view, this was insufficient.

== See also ==
- Faretta v. California
- Patterson v. Illinois
