= 2003 term per curiam opinions of the Supreme Court of the United States =

The Supreme Court of the United States handed down seven per curiam opinions during its 2003 term, which began October 6, 2003 and concluded October 3, 2004.

Because per curiam decisions are issued from the Court as an institution, these opinions all lack the attribution of authorship or joining votes to specific justices. All justices on the Court at the time the decision was handed down are assumed to have participated and concurred unless otherwise noted.

== Court membership ==
Chief Justice: William Rehnquist

Associate Justices: John Paul Stevens, Sandra Day O'Connor, Antonin Scalia, Anthony Kennedy, David Souter, Clarence Thomas, Ruth Bader Ginsburg, Stephen Breyer

== Yarborough v. Gentry ==
- Full caption: Michael Yarborough, Warden v. Lionel E. Gentry
- Citations: 540 U.S. 1; 124 S. Ct. 1; 157 L. Ed. 2d 1; 2003 U.S. LEXIS 7701; 72 U.S.L.W. 3278; 2003 Cal. Daily Op. Service 9167; 2003 Daily Journal DAR 11517; 16 Fla. L. Weekly Fed. S 479
- Prior history: Petition denied, sub nom., Gentry v. Roe, C.D. Cal.; reversed, conviction vacated, 320 F.3d 891 (9th Cir. 2002)
- Subsequent history: On remand, affirmed, sub nom., Gentry v. Roe, 381 F.3d 1219 (9th Cir. 2004)
- Full text of the opinion: official slip opinion

540 U.S. 1
Decided October 20, 2003.
Ninth Circuit reversed.

== Mitchell v. Esparza ==
- Full caption: Betty Mitchell, Warden v. Gregory Esparza
- Citations: 540 U.S. 12; 124 S. Ct. 7; 157 L. Ed. 2d 263; 2003 U.S. LEXIS 8191; 72 U.S.L.W. 3305; 2003 Cal. Daily Op. Service 9574; 17 Fla. L. Weekly Fed. S 1
- Prior history: Petition granted, N.D. Ohio; affirmed, 310 F.3d 414 (6th Cir. 2002)
- Subsequent history: Rehearing denied, 540 U.S. 1142 (2004)
- Full text of the opinion: official slip opinion

540 U.S. 12
Decided November 3, 2003.
Sixth Circuit reversed and remanded.

== Illinois v. Fisher ==
- Full caption: Illinois v. Gregory Fisher
- Citations: 540 U.S. 544; 124 S. Ct. 1200; 157 L. Ed. 2d 1060; 2004 U.S. LEXIS 1412; 72 U.S.L.W. 3533; 17 Fla. L. Weekly Fed. S 144
- Prior history: Defendant convicted, Cook County Circuit Court; reversed, Ill. App.; leave to appeal denied, 792 N.E.2d 310 (Ill. 2003)
- Full text of the opinion: official slip opinion

540 U.S. 544
Decided February 23, 2004.
Appellate Court of Illinois, First District, reversed and remanded.

Stevens filed a concurrence.

== Muhammad v. Close ==
- Full caption: Shakur Muhammad, aka John E. Mease v. Mark Close
- Citations: 540 U.S. 749; 124 S. Ct. 1303; 158 L. Ed. 2d 32; 2004 U.S. LEXIS 1627; 72 U.S.L.W. 4216; 17 Fla. L. Weekly Fed. S 171
- Prior history: Judgment for defendant, E.D. Mich.; affirmed, 47 Fed. Appx. 738 (6th Cir.); cert. granted, 539 U.S. 925 (2003)
- Subsequent history: On remand, reversed, 379 F.3d 413 (6th Cir. 2004)
- Full text of the opinion: official slip opinion

540 U.S. 749
Argued December 1, 2003.
Decided February 25, 2004.
Sixth Circuit reversed and remanded.

== Johnson v. California ==
- Full caption: Jay Shawn Johnson v. California
- Citations: 541 U.S. 428; 124 S. Ct. 1833; 158 L. Ed. 2d 696; 2004 U.S. LEXIS 3380; 72 U.S.L.W. 4348; 17 Fla. L. Weekly Fed. S 264
- Prior history: Defendant convicted, No. 96-0691-4, Contra Costa County Superior Court, California; reversed, 105 Cal. Rptr. 2d 727 (Cal. App. 2001); review granted, 26 P.3d 1039 (Cal. 2001); reversed, 71 P.3d 270 (Cal. 2003); cert. granted, 540 U.S. 1045
- Subsequent history: On remand, review denied, No. S127602, 2004 Cal. LEXIS 10226 (Cal. Oct. 20, 2004); cert. granted, 543 U.S. 1042 (2005); reversed and remanded, 545 U.S. 162 (2005); on remand, remanded, 38 Cal. 4th 1096 (Cal. App. 2006)
- Full text of the opinion: official slip opinion

541 U.S. 428
Argued March 30, 2004.
Decided May 3, 2004.
The Court dismissed the case for want of jurisdiction.

== Middleton v. McNeil ==
- Full caption: Raymond L. Middleton, Warden v. Sallie Marie McNeil
- Citations: 541 U.S. 433; 124 S. Ct. 1830; 158 L. Ed. 2d 701; 2004 U.S. LEXIS 3381; 72 U.S.L.W. 3687; 17 Fla. L. Weekly Fed. S 265
- Prior history: Petition denied, C.D. Cal.; reversed, 344 F.3d 988 (9th Cir. 2003)
- Full text of the opinion: official slip opinion

541 U.S. 433
Decided May 3, 2004.
Ninth Circuit reversed and remanded.

== Holland v. Jackson ==
- Full caption: Flora Holland, Warden v. Jessie L. Jackson
- Citations: 542 U.S. 649; 124 S. Ct. 2736; 159 L. Ed. 2d 683; 2004 U.S. LEXIS 4758; 72 U.S.L.W. 3766; 2004 Fla. L. Weekly Fed. S 474
- Prior history: Habeas petition denied, M.D. Tenn.; reversed, 80 Fed. Appx. 392 (6th Cir. 2003)
- Full text of the opinion: official slip opinion

542 U.S. 649
Decided June 28, 2004.
Sixth Circuit reversed and remanded.

Stevens, Souter, Ginsburg, and Breyer noted without separate opinion that they would deny the petition for a writ of certiorari.

== See also ==
- List of United States Supreme Court cases, volume 540
- List of United States Supreme Court cases, volume 541
- List of United States Supreme Court cases, volume 542
