= Grupo Dataflux v. Atlas Global Group, L.P. =

- Supreme Court of the United States

Decided May 17, 2004
- Full case name: Grupo Dataflux v. Atlas Global Group, L.P.
- Citations: 541 U.S. 567 (more)

Holding
- A party's post-filing change in citizenship cannot cure a lack of subject-matter jurisdiction that existed at the time of filing in a diversity action.

Court membership
- Chief Justice William Rehnquist Associate Justices John P. Stevens · Sandra Day O'Connor; Antonin Scalia · Anthony Kennedy; David Souter · Clarence Thomas; Ruth Bader Ginsburg · Stephen Breyer

Case opinions
- Majority: Scalia, joined by Rehnquist, O'Connor, Kennedy, Thomas
- Dissent: Ginsburg, joined by Stevens, Souter, Breyer

Grupo Dataflux v. Atlas Global Group, L.P., 541 U.S. 567 (2004), was a United States Supreme Court case in which the court held that a party's post-filing change in citizenship cannot cure a lack of subject-matter jurisdiction that existed at the time of filing in a diversity action.

== Background ==
Atlas Global Group, L. P., a limited partnership created under Texas law, filed a state-law suit against Grupo Dataflux, a Mexican corporation, in federal district court, alleging diversity jurisdiction. After the jury returned a verdict for Atlas, but before entry of judgment, Grupt moved to dismiss for lack of subject-matter jurisdiction because the parties were not diverse at the time the complaint was filed. In granting the motion, the magistrate judge found that, as a partnership, Atlas was a Mexican citizen because two of its partners, also respondents, were Mexican citizens at the time of filing; and that the requisite diversity was absent because petitioner was also a Mexican citizen. On appeal, Atlas urged the Fifth Circuit Court of Appeals to disregard the diversity failure at the time of filing because the Mexican partners had left Atlas before the trial began and, thus, diversity existed thereafter. Relying on Caterpillar Inc. v. Lewis, the Fifth Circuit held that the conclusiveness of citizenship at the time of filing is subject to an exception where, as here, the jurisdictional error was not identified until after the jury's verdict and the post-filing change in the partnership cured the jurisdictional defect before it was identified.

The Supreme Court granted certiorari.

== Opinion of the court ==
The Supreme Court issued an opinion on May 17, 2004.
