= Norton v. Southern Utah Wilderness Alliance =

Norton v. S. Utah Wilderness Alliance
- Supreme Court of the United States

Argued March 29, 2004 Decided June 14, 2004
- Full case name: Gale Norton, Secretary of the Interior, et al. v. Southern Utah Wilderness Alliance et al.
- Docket no.: 03-101
- Citations: 542 U.S. 55 (more) 124 S. Ct. 2373; 159 L. Ed. 2d 137

Court membership
- Chief Justice William Rehnquist Associate Justices John P. Stevens · Sandra Day O'Connor; Antonin Scalia · Anthony Kennedy; David Souter · Clarence Thomas; Ruth Bader Ginsburg · Stephen Breyer

Case opinion
- Majority: Scalia, joined by unanimous

Laws applied
- Administrative Procedure Act 702, 704, 706.

Norton v. Southern Utah Wilderness Alliance, 542 U.S. 55 (2004), was a Supreme Court case that held that although the Administrative Procedure Act says that a person may challenge an agency's failure to act, this provision essentially just carries forward the writ of mandamus. Thus an agency cannot be compelled to act unless there is some non-discretionary, discrete act. Therefore, in this case, an interest group could not challenge an agency's failure to "act so as to preserve the wilderness" in accordance with the statute.

== Background ==
Under the Federal Land Policy and Management Act of 1976, the federal Bureau of Land Management is required to manage "2.5 million acres of land in Utah" called "wilderness study areas." The Southern Utah Wilderness Alliance and other environmentalist groups filed suit under the Administrative Procedure Act, compelling the government to act when "an agency has failed to meet its legal duties." The Wilderness Alliance claimed that the Bureau of Land Management had failed to adequately protect the study areas and that the bureau permitted off-road vehicle use that damaged the study areas, violating the act passed by Congress in 1976.

== See also ==
- List of United States Supreme Court cases, volume 542
- List of United States Supreme Court cases
