= Horahora Power Station =

Coordinates: 37°57.133′S 175°39.446′E

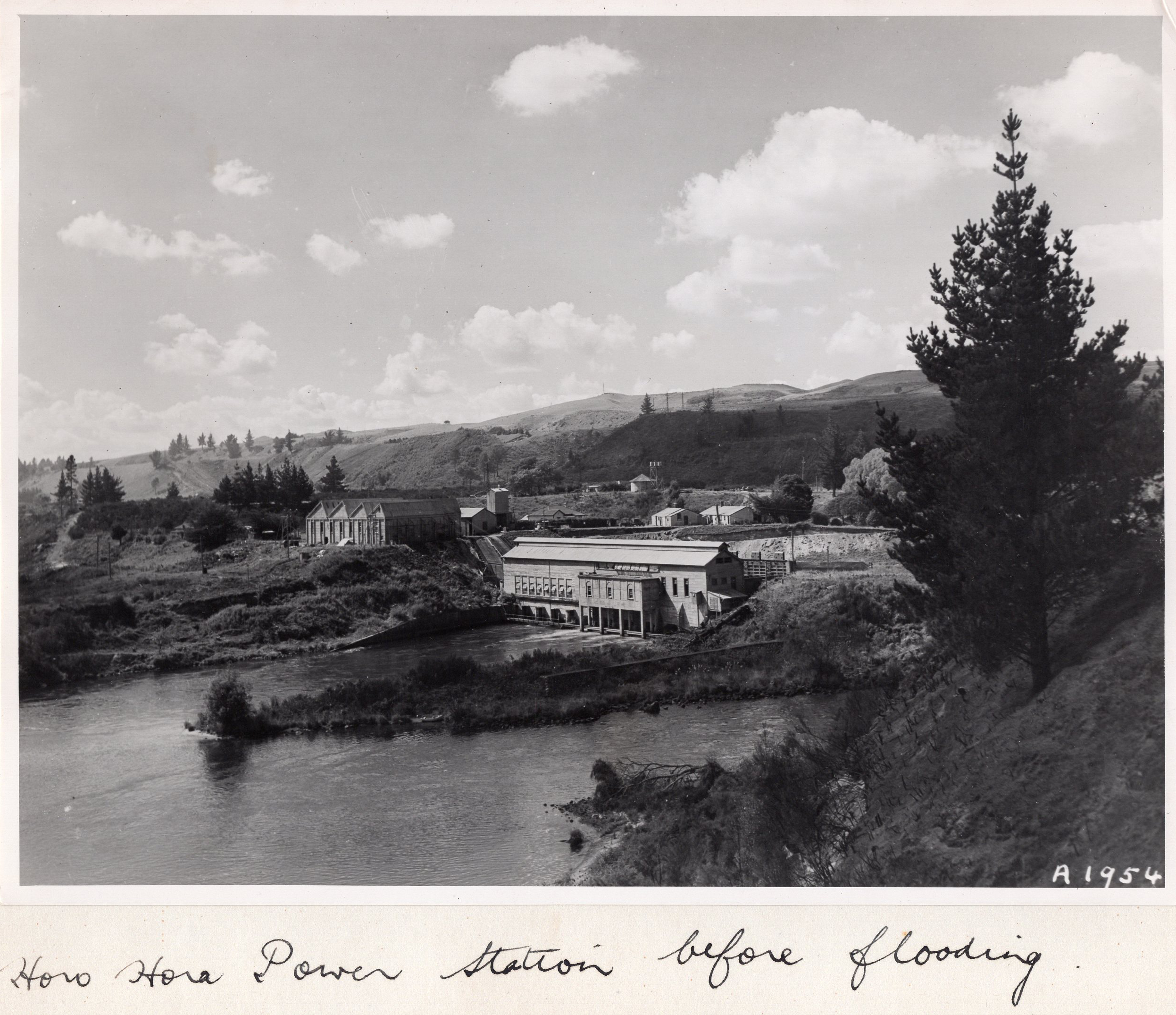
- Horahora Power Station before being submerged
- Interactive map of Horahora Power Station
- Country: New Zealand
- Opening date: 1913

Horahora Power Station was an early hydroelectric power station on the Waikato River in New Zealand. It was the country’s first large-scale power station, completed in 1913. Initially built to service a gold mine, the power station was expanded to supply a significant part of the North Island. The power station remained in use until it was submerged by Lake Karapiro, which was formed to supply the larger Karapiro Power Station.

== History ==
Horahora power station was built by the Waihi gold mining company to provide power for mining operations at Waihi, about 80 km away. Construction began in 1910 and took three years, continuing through the Waihi miners' strike despite attempts to involve the Horahora construction workers in the strike action. When the power station opened in October 1913 it was the largest generating plant in the country with a capacity of 6.3 megawatts (8,400 hp). The power was put to use throughout the mine and stamping mills, however under the mining company’s ownership the power station was never utilised to its full capacity.

The power station was bought by the NZ government in 1919 and it began to supply Cambridge, Hamilton and surrounding farming districts. In 1926 the power station was upgraded, increasing capacity to 10.3 megawatts (13,800 hp). This allowed supply to be extended to include the Bay of Plenty and Auckland.

Around 7:55 pm of 1 September 1928, a fire broke out in the power station's workshop and oil store, and quickly spread to the transformer house. As a result, the supply from the station was cut, blacking out the entire upper North Island. Supply to most areas was restored by 11:45 pm using various backup power plants, but it took until the following morning to re-establish supply to Rotorua and the eastern Bay of Plenty. Partial generation from Horahora was restored on the evening of 3 September, and full generation on 30 September.

== Submerging ==
In April 1947 Lake Karapiro was finally formed behind the Karapiro Power Station dam, submerging Horahora. It was kept generating until the last possible day, 4 April, due to power shortages, with the turbines and generator units being left in place. To the amusement of onlookers, two generators continued to rotate and thrash the rising waters, even after the water had almost covered them. The first turbine-generator at Karapiro was commissioned on 10 April 1947, just six days after Horahora was flooded; however problems with the guide bearing meant full generation didn't start until 21 April.

== See also ==
- List of power stations in New Zealand
- Electricity sector in New Zealand
