= United States v. Dominguez Benitez =

- Supreme Court of the United States

Argued April 21, 2004 Decided June 14, 2004
- Full case name: United States, Petitioner v. Carlos Dominguez Benitez
- Citations: 542 U.S. 74 (more) 124 S. Ct. 2333; 159 L. Ed. 2d 157; 2004 U.S. LEXIS 4177; 72 U.S.L.W. 4478; 17 Fla. L. Weekly Fed. S 379
- Argument: Oral argument

Case history
- Prior: Defendant convicted, C.D. Cal., affirmed in part, reversed and remanded, 30 Fed. Appx. 706 (9th Cir. Jan 29, 2002); reversed and remanded, 310 F.3d 1221 (9th Cir. 2002); separate ruling denying substitution of counsel affirmed, 2002 U.S. App. LEXIS 24416 (9th Cir. 2002); cert. granted, 540 U.S. 1072 (2003)
- Subsequent: On remand, conviction affirmed, 381 F.3d 859 (9th Cir. 2004)

Holding
- An untimely objection to the omission of a Rule 11 warning warrants reversal only if there is a reasonable probability that but for the trial court's error, the defendant would not have pleaded guilty.

Court membership
- Chief Justice William Rehnquist Associate Justices John P. Stevens · Sandra Day O'Connor; Antonin Scalia · Anthony Kennedy; David Souter · Clarence Thomas; Ruth Bader Ginsburg · Stephen Breyer

Case opinions
- Majority: Souter, joined by Rehnquist, Stevens, O'Connor, Kennedy, Thomas, Ginsburg, Breyer
- Concurrence: Scalia

Laws applied
- Fed. R. Crim. P. 11; 52

United States v. Dominguez Benitez, 542 U.S. 74 (2004), was a United States Supreme Court case in which the Court ruled that, in a criminal proceeding in federal court, a defendant who does not alert the district court to a possible violation of Rule 11 of the Federal Rules of Criminal Procedure must show on appeal that the violation affirmatively affected his rights in order to obtain reversal of his conviction by guilty plea. Rule 11, which pertains to criminal prosecutions in United States federal courts only, governs the offering of plea bargains to criminal defendants and the procedures district courts must employ to ensure that the defendant knows of and properly waives his trial-related constitutional rights.

In Benitez, the trial court violated Rule 11 when it took the defendant's plea by failing to warn him that the plea could not be withdrawn if the court did not accept the prosecution's sentencing recommendations. The United States Court of Appeals for the Ninth Circuit reversed the conviction, considering that the non-English speaking defendant did not understand his rights under those circumstances.

The Supreme Court unanimously reversed, ruling the Court of Appeals had applied the wrong test by not requiring the defendant to show how the error actually prejudiced the proceedings. The Court of Appeals had consequently failed to consider the entire record regarding what the defendant understood. An eight-justice majority of the Supreme Court, in an opinion by Justice David Souter, held that a defendant attempting to reverse his conviction due to a Rule 11 violation must show a reasonable probability that, but for the trial court's error, he would not have entered the plea. Justice Antonin Scalia concurred in the judgment but disagreed with the majority's standard.

== Background of the case ==
=== Arrest and indictment ===
Carlos Dominguez Benitez arranged to sell several pounds of methamphetamine to an informant secretly working with law enforcement. Benitez was arrested while making the sale, confessed, and gave information on his supplier and fellow drug dealers. Benitez was then indicted by a federal grand jury under the Comprehensive Drug Abuse Prevention and Control Act of 1970 for conspiracy to possess more than 500 grams (18 oz) of a methamphetamine mixture, and for possession of 1,391 grams (49.1 oz) of a methamphetamine mixture, both with intent to distribute. Under the statutory sentencing ranges, Benitez faced anywhere from ten years to life in prison, and his court-appointed counsel began discussing a plea bargain while he faced trial before the United States District Court for the Central District of California.

=== Plea agreement and District Court sentencing ===
Benitez, who could only speak and write in Spanish, sent several letters to the District Court, in which he expressed dissatisfaction with his attorney and the plea agreement he was being encouraged to sign. During a hearing, however, Benitez expressed that he did not want to go to trial but just wanted a better deal, and the court declined to make any change. Benitez and the federal prosecutor subsequently agreed that he would plead guilty to the conspiracy charge in exchange for the possession charge being dropped, and that the prosecutor would stipulate to a "safety valve" that would allow him to avoid the statutory ten year minimum sentence, provided he could meet the statutory conditions. Benitez was warned in discussion with the prosecutor and in the written plea agreement that the agreement was not binding on the District Court, and that Benitez would not be able to withdraw his guilty plea if the court rejected the prosecutor's recommendations.

However, at the hearing the next day when Benitez entered his guilty plea, District Court judge Alicemarie H. Stotler failed to deliver the warning required by Federal Rule of Criminal Procedure 11(c)(3)(B) that he would not be able to withdraw his plea. Benitez's earlier criminal convictions under a different name were subsequently discovered, which rendered him ineligible for the "safety valve." He was then sentenced to the statutory minimum of ten years in prison over his objection that he was never told what the conditions of the "safety valve" sentence reduction were.

=== Ninth Circuit Court of Appeals decision ===
Benitez appealed his conviction and sentencing to the United States Court of Appeals for the Ninth Circuit, arguing that the District Court's failure to comply with all of the required Rule 11 warnings was ground for reversal. A three-judge panel of the court consisting of Circuit Judges James R. Browning, Stephen Reinhardt, and Richard C. Tallman voted 2-1 to reverse his conviction and sentence. The court's opinion was written by Judge Browning, and the dissent by Judge Tallman.

Because Benitez did not object to the District Court's failure prior to his conviction, the error was not preserved for appeal and so was reviewed under the plain error standard of Fed. R. Crim. P. 52(b), pursuant to the Supreme Court's ruling in United States v. Vonn, 535 U.S. 55 (2002). The Court of Appeals applied a two part test to determine whether plain error had been committed. First, the defendant had to establish that the court's error was not "merely minor or technical." The court considered this satisfied by the inherently serious nature of a Rule 11 violation alone, because the rule was intended to ensure that a defendant's plea was made intelligently and knowingly. Second, the defendant had to establish that he did not understand the rights at issue when he entered his guilty plea. The court found that this second element was satisfied because Benitez's language barrier had prevented him from gaining a full understanding of his rights from only the written plea agreement and other comments made by the court.

Judge Tallman's dissent argued that Vonn required the court to view the proceedings as a whole in determining whether the Rule 11 violation constituted plain error. He believed that although the record showed that the Rule 11 "magic words" may not have been spoken, Benitez's counsel and the District Court had fully discussed the plea agreement with him, and that he had expressed understanding of all the relevant issues.

== The court's decision ==
The Supreme Court granted review on the narrow issue of on what basis a court's failure to comply with Rule 11 constitutes reversible error, and unanimously reversed. Justice David Souter wrote the majority opinion, which seven Justices joined. Justice Antonin Scalia wrote a separate opinion concurring in the judgment.

The Court stated that even for preserved errors, only those that structurally "undermine the fairness of a criminal proceeding as a whole" require reversal without a consideration of the effect the error had on the proceeding. The omission of a Rule 11 warning alone does not fall into this category. Furthermore, the Rule 52 phrase "error that affects substantial rights," which is used in Rule 52, "has previously been taken to mean error with a prejudicial effect on the outcome of a judicial proceeding." The Court concluded by holding that "a defendant who seeks reversal of his conviction after a guilty plea, on the ground that the district court committed plain error under Rule 11, must show a reasonable probability that, but for the error, he would not have entered the plea." The Court explained that a reasonable probability is one that is "sufficient to undermine confidence in the outcome" of the proceeding.

In the Court's view—essentially the same as Judge Tallman's—the Court of Appeals' standard failed because it did not consider record evidence that tended to show that any misunderstanding was inconsequential, or what the relative significance of the factors involved in Benitez's plea decision were regardless of the Rule 11 error. The Court acknowledged that the standard it imposed would be very rarely met, but that it was still easier than if the defendant had to prove the claim by a preponderance of the evidence.

Though the Supreme Court did not explicitly decide whether Benitez met the proper standard, its opinion nonetheless proceeded with an unfavorable analysis of his case. The Court believed that his statements in the record showed that he may have been confused about the substantive law of the safety valve provision, but not that there was a "causal link" between his confusion and the Rule 11 violation. The strength of the government's case was also a factor, and the Court did not think that the proper Rule 11 warning would have changed his "assessment of his strategic position." This was especially true because the written plea agreement included the warning that it would be irrevocable, and it had been read to him in Spanish. The Court accordingly reversed the Court of Appeals, and remanded the case.

=== Scalia's concurrence ===
In a short separate opinion, Justice Scalia expressed agreement with much of the Court's analysis, but disagreed with the standard of probability the Court required the defendant to meet. Scalia listed four different standards that the Court had adopted in different contexts to prove what would have happened in a trial absent error, and stated that these "ineffable gradations of probability" confused judicial reasoning more than aided it. He wrote that a court could only achieve the precision of two standards—beyond a reasonable doubt, and by a preponderance of the evidence—and that the latter should apply to the claim at issue.

== Subsequent developments ==
Upon remand from the Supreme Court, the Court of Appeals affirmed Benitez's conviction and sentencing in a per curiam, summary opinion.

== See also ==
- List of United States Supreme Court cases, volume 542
- List of United States Supreme Court cases
