= Karāpiro Power Station =

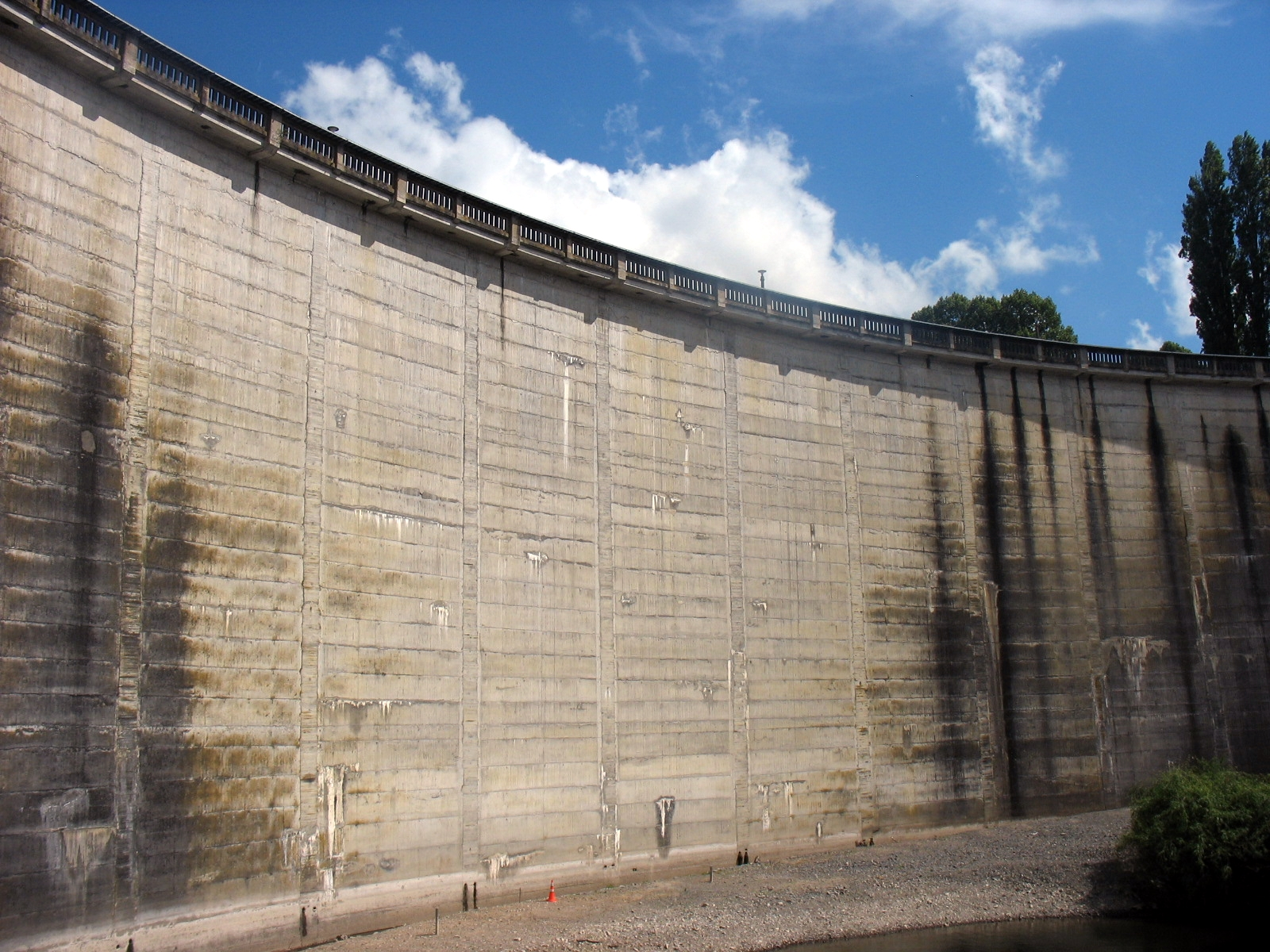
- Part of the Karāpiro Dam

- Location within New Zealand
- Country: New Zealand
- Location: Near Cambridge, Waikato
- Coordinates: 37°55′26″S 175°32′21″E
- Status: Operational
- Construction began: 1940
- Opening date: May 1948
- Owner: Mercury Energy

Dam and spillways
- Type of dam: Arch dam
- Impounds: Waikato River
- Height: 52.4 m (172 ft)
- Length: 335 m (1,099 ft)
- Width (crest): 2.4 m (7 ft 10 in)
- Width (base): 15.2 m (50 ft)
- Spillways: Four

Reservoir
- Creates: Lake Karapiro
- Surface area: 7.7 km^{2} (3.0 sq mi)
- Maximum water depth: 30.5 m (100 ft)

Power Station
- Type: Conventional
- Hydraulic head: 30 m (98 ft)
- Turbines: 3 × Kaplan
- Installed capacity: 112.5 MW
- Annual generation: 537 GWh

Karāpiro Power Station is a hydroelectric power station at Lake Karapiro in the North Island of New Zealand. It is the last of the eight hydroelectric power stations on the Waikato River. The power station is 30 kilometres (19 mi) south-east and upstream from the city of Hamilton and approximately 9 kilometres from Cambridge.

Karāpiro is a baseload power station, as it is required to operate to maintain minimum water flows in the Waikato River below the dam, even during low inflows to the catchment and during low electricity demand. The typical minimum flow requirement downstream of the station is 148 cubic metres per second. Only two turbines are required to keep the river flow at a reasonable level, with the third turbine being available for peak generation and during maintenance on either of the other turbines.

Like all of the hydroelectric power stations on the Waikato River, Karāpiro is operated by electricity generator Mercury Energy.

== History ==
Karāpiro was the second power station built in the Waikato hydro scheme, after Arapuni. Construction of the dam and power station began in 1940, but a materials and labour shortage due to World War II meant progress was slow. The station was completed in 1947, four years behind schedule.

The creation of Lake Karapiro behind the dam flooded the Horahora Power Station, the first power station built on the Waikato River.

The first generator was commissioned on 10 April 1947, just six days after Horahora was flooded. However, problems with the guide bearing meant full generation didn't start until 21 April 1947. The second generator was commissioned on 21 September 1947. In the first 12 months (to 31 March 1948), the station produced 349,568 megawatt-hours of electricity, just over 20 percent of the North Island's electricity requirements.

The third and final generator was commissioned in May 1948.

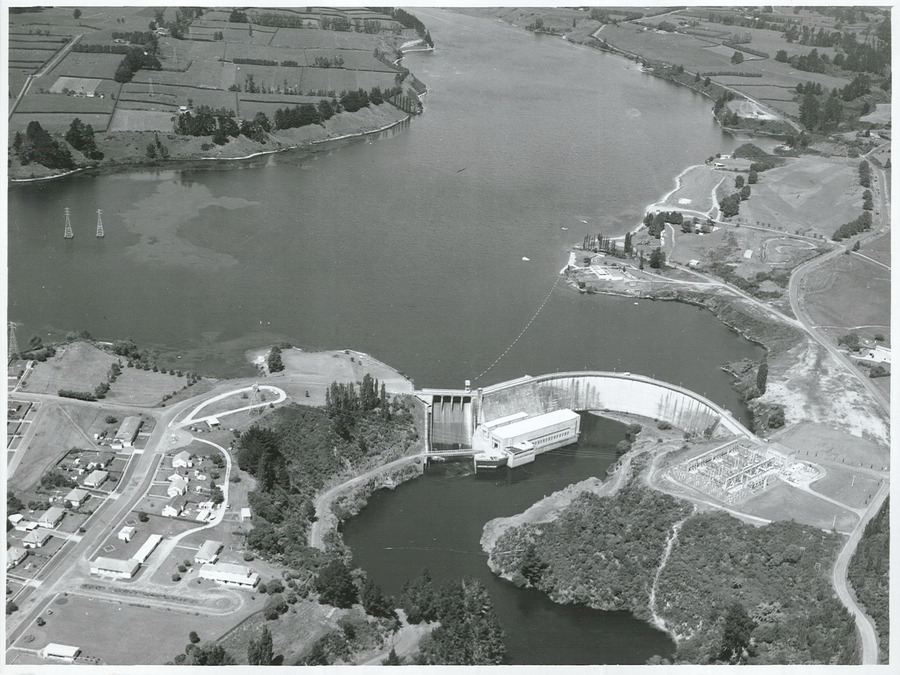
Aerial view of Karāpiro Hydro Power Station, Waikato River, February 1969

The bridge over the spillway is the only road access to the turbine hall. The first bridge had a supporting column in the centre of the bridge. The bridge was destroyed by the water running through the spillway in a significant flood event (Source: Mighty River Photo archives). The replacement bridge is as you see today with no supporting column.

To the left of the four spillway gates are three siphon tubes. These were designed for the management of the lake level under normal river flow and the spillway gates were to be used in only extreme conditions. The design of the siphon tubes was faulty: The flow of water was supposed to be stopped by a blast of air, but this never worked properly - resulting in the spillway gates to be used for lake level control.

In 2019, Mercury Energy announced a major upgrade of the power station. Over the 3 year period 2022-2025, the three original turbines and generators were replaced. The installed capacity was increased from 96 MW to 112.5 MW. The projected annual energy production will increase from an average of 505 GWh to 537 GWh.

== Generation ==
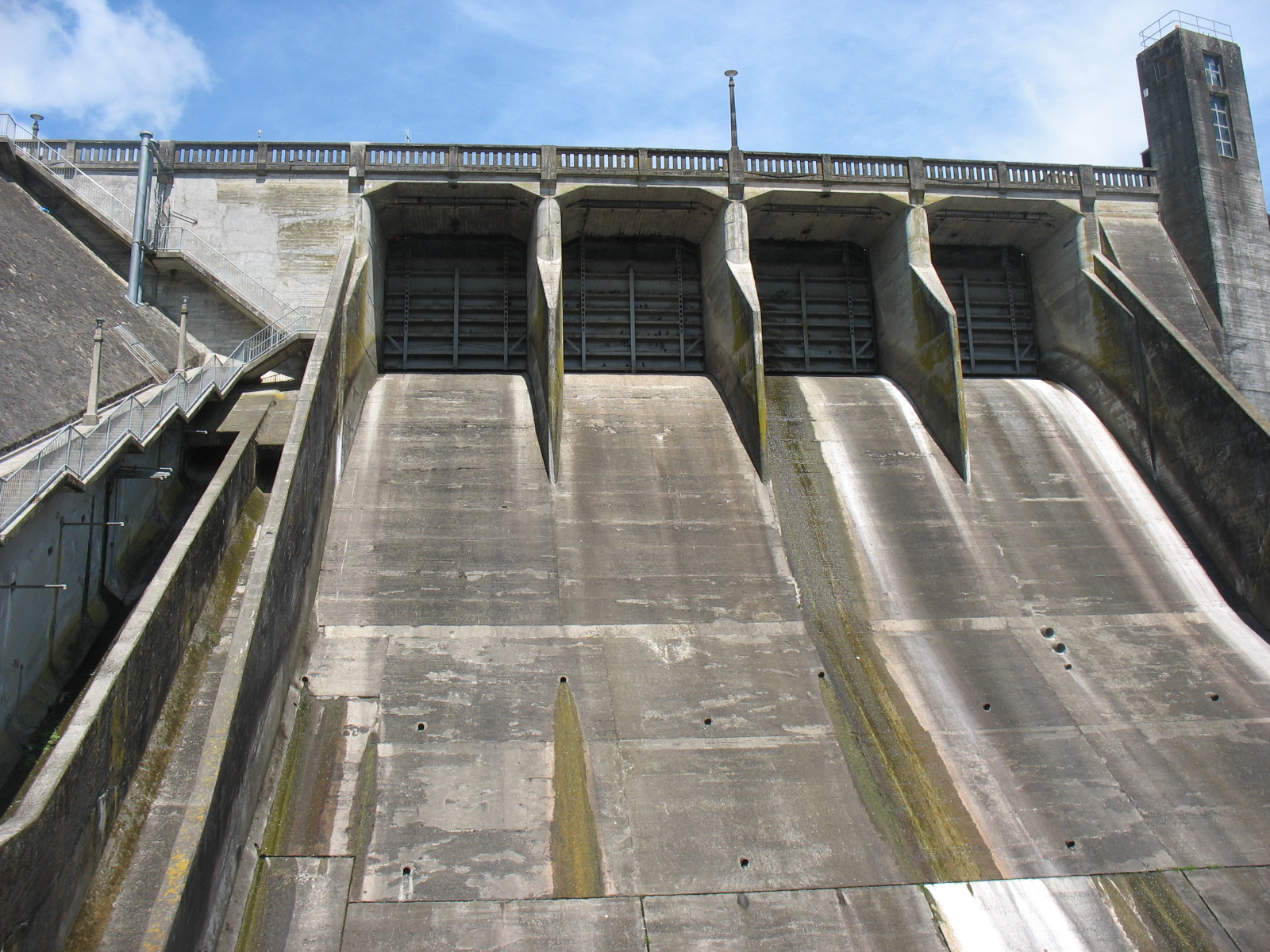
The Dam's spillway

Karāpiro's powerhouse is located on the northern bank of the river, with a diversion tunnel and spillway also on the northern bank. The river is dammed by a concrete arch dam behind the powerhouse, with the electricity substation on the southern bank of the river.

Water from Lake Karapiro runs through the penstocks to three Kaplan turbines. Each turbine drives a generator with a rated maximum power output of 37.5 MW, at 11,000 volts. Around 3,770 litres (830 imp gal; 1,000 US gal) of water every second is required to pass through the turbines for every 1 MW of power output.

Karāpiro is controlled remotely by Mercury Energy's Waikato River control room in Hamilton.

== Transmission ==
As part of the power station's construction, a 110,000 volt double-circuit line was built from the station to Hamilton substation. The line was commissioned on 29 March 1947. This line remains in service today as the main connection from Karāpiro to the rest of the national grid. In addition, 110,000 volt single-circuit lines connect Karāpiro with Te Awamutu and Hinuera substations. The transmission lines are owned and operated by national grid operator Transpower.

== See also ==
- Electricity sector in New Zealand
- List of power stations in New Zealand
