= Central Laborers' Pension Fund v. Heinz =

- Supreme Court of the United States

Argued April 19, 2004 Decided June 7, 2004
- Full case name: Central Laborers' Pension Fund, Petitioner v. Thomas E. Heinz, et al.
- Citations: 541 U.S. 739 (more) 124 S. Ct. 2230; 159 L. Ed. 2d 46

Holding
- ERISA §204(g) prohibits a plan amendment expanding the categories of postretirement employment that triggers suspension of the payment of early retirement benefits already accrued.

Court membership
- Chief Justice William Rehnquist Associate Justices John P. Stevens · Sandra Day O'Connor; Antonin Scalia · Anthony Kennedy; David Souter · Clarence Thomas; Ruth Bader Ginsburg · Stephen Breyer

Case opinions
- Majority: Souter, joined by unanimous court
- Concurrence: Breyer, joined by Rehnquist, O'Connor, Ginsburg

Central Laborers' Pension Fund v. Heinz, 541 U.S. 739 (2004), is a case that was argued in the Supreme Court of the United States on 19 April 2004. The question it presented was whether Section 204(g) of the Employee Retirement Income Security Act contradicts Section 203(a)(3)(B).
