= Interior Board of Land Appeals =

Agency overview
- Agency executive: Silvia Riechel Idziorek, Chief Administrative Judge
- Parent department: United States Department of the Interior
- Website: IBLA

The Interior Board of Land Appeals (IBLA) is an appellate review body that exercises the delegated authority of the United States secretary of the interior to issue final decisions for the United States Department of the Interior.

== History ==
The IBLA was proposed in February 1963 in a bill introduced by Senator Ernest Gruening and supported by 12 additional members of the United States Senate representing western states. The bill proposed to establish a three-member board empowered to hold hearings and decide appeals from decisions of the Bureau of Land Management and the United States Geological Survey. In introducing the bill, Gruening asserted the need to remedy the absence of a statutory right for landowners. The effort was initially opposed by the Department of the Interior, in testimony by Assistant Secretary John A. Carver Jr. before the Senate public lands subcommittee in May 1963. Carver acknowledged the need for a mechanism for landowners to appeal determinations, but stated that the department could develop an internal process for that purpose. Although this effort failed, it spurred Congress to create the Public Land Law Review Commission, which also criticized the appellate process available to landowners, culminating in the 1970 decision of the Department of the Interior to create the Office of Hearings and Appeals, with the IBLA as a component of that office.

== Structure and functions ==
Its administrative judges decide appeals from bureau decisions relating to the use and disposition of public lands and their resources, mineral resources on the Outer Continental Shelf, and the conduct of surface coal mining operations under the Surface Mining Control and Reclamation Act of 1977. Located within the Department's Office of Hearings and Appeals, IBLA is separate and independent from the bureaus and offices whose decisions it reviews.

IBLA is headed by a chief administrative judge. IBLA's decisions are final for the department and may be reviewed by the United States district courts.

== Overview ==
IBLA has the authority to consider the following types of cases:

- Appeals from a variety of decisions of the Bureau of Land Management, including but not limited to decisions regarding mining, grazing, energy development, royalty management, timber harvesting, wildfire management, recreation, wild horse and burro management, cadastral surveys, Alaska land conveyances, rights of way, land exchanges, and trespass actions;
- Appeals from decisions of the Office of Natural Resources Revenue and the deputy assistant secretary for natural resources revenue regarding royalty management;
- Appeals from decisions of the Bureau of Ocean Energy Management and the Bureau of Safety and Environmental Enforcement;
- Appeals from decisions of the Bureau of Indian Affairs regarding minerals management on Indian lands;
- Appeals from decisions of the Office of Surface Mining Reclamation and Enforcement regarding surface coal mining operations; and
- Appeals from decisions of administrative law judges in OHA's Departmental Cases Hearings Division.

Decisions of the IBLA may be appealed to the United States Court of Appeals with jurisdiction over the circuit in which the lands are located.
