= Siphon tubes =

Siphon tubes are a basic implement used in irrigation to transfer water over a barrier (such as the bank of a raised irrigation canal), using the siphon principle.

At the simplest they consist of a pipe with no working parts. To work they rely on the water level in the canal being at a higher level than the water level in the field being irrigated.

Like any siphon they must be primed (that is, filled with water) before they will start reliably transferring water. However, once primed and positioned correctly, they will continue transferring water from the source to the destination.

== Operation ==
The simplest siphon tubes are operated by simply filling the tube with water (by immersion in the canal, or other means), keeping one end in the canal and with the other end sealed, placing it in the area to be irrigated. The seal can then be removed and the water will siphon transferring the water from the submerged higher end to the lower end.

For tubes of up to 150mm diameter and several meters long, this is all easily undertaken by one person without any other tools. An effective seal is produced using a hand - with a rapid enough action there will be sufficient water in the tube to start the siphon effect.

Larger capacity siphon tubes may have mechanical means of sealing the ends, and allow for a pump to be used to prime the tube.

They can be used to either flood, or drain, as required.

== Benefits ==
The main benefit of siphon tubes is that they are relatively inexpensive, and do not require any engineering to put into place (unlike say a sluice gate embedded in the bank of the canal). They are easily relocated from one bay or field to another as the required water level is reached.
