= Lee, California =

Former settlement in Inyo County

Coordinates: 36.6047°N 116.6848°W

Lee (also, Lees Camp) is a former settlement in Inyo County, California, United States.

It was located near the Nevada state line, 15 miles (24 km) east of Beatty Junction.

A post office operated at Lee from 1907 to 1912. Its first postmaster was John H. Lawrence. The name honors Richard and Gus Lee, who discovered gold at the site. Founded in 1905, Lee had a population of 600 people in 1907, and the town had a rivalry with nearby Rhyolite, Nevada. Lee had many saloons, a hiring hall of the Death Valley Miners Union, a store, a newspaper, and even a red light district. However, the Panic of 1907 began the eventual decline of Lee. The town store was open until 1912, and the post office closed the same year. Several artifacts can be found at the site, including stone walls and foundations, along with mine shafts and tunnels, cans, and broken glass bottles.

== See also ==
- List of ghost towns in California
