= Lake Karapiro =

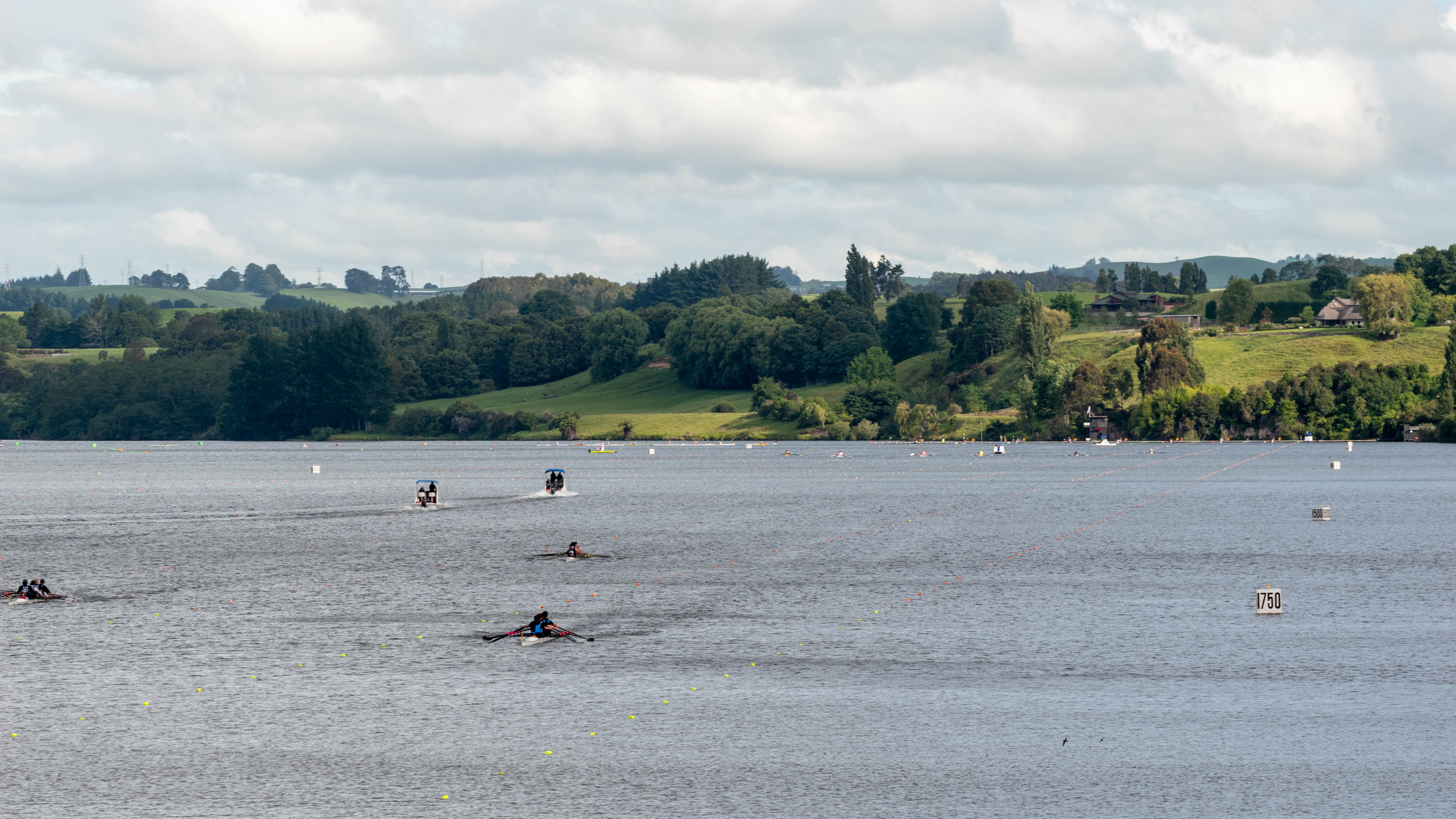
- Lake Karapiro

- Location within North Island
- Location: North Island
- Coordinates: 37.92856°S 175.544529°E
- Lake type: reservoir
- Primary inflows: Waikato River
- Primary outflows: Waikato River
- Basin countries: New Zealand
- First flooded: April 1947
- Max. length: 11.0 kilometres (6.8 mi)
- Max. width: 0.9 kilometres (0.56 mi)
- Surface area: 7.7 km^{2} (3.0 sq mi)
- Average depth: 11.0 metres (36.1 ft)
- Max. depth: 30.5 metres (100 ft)
- Water volume: 0.085 cubic kilometres (0.020 cu mi)
- Surface elevation: 50.5–53.5 metres (166–176 ft)

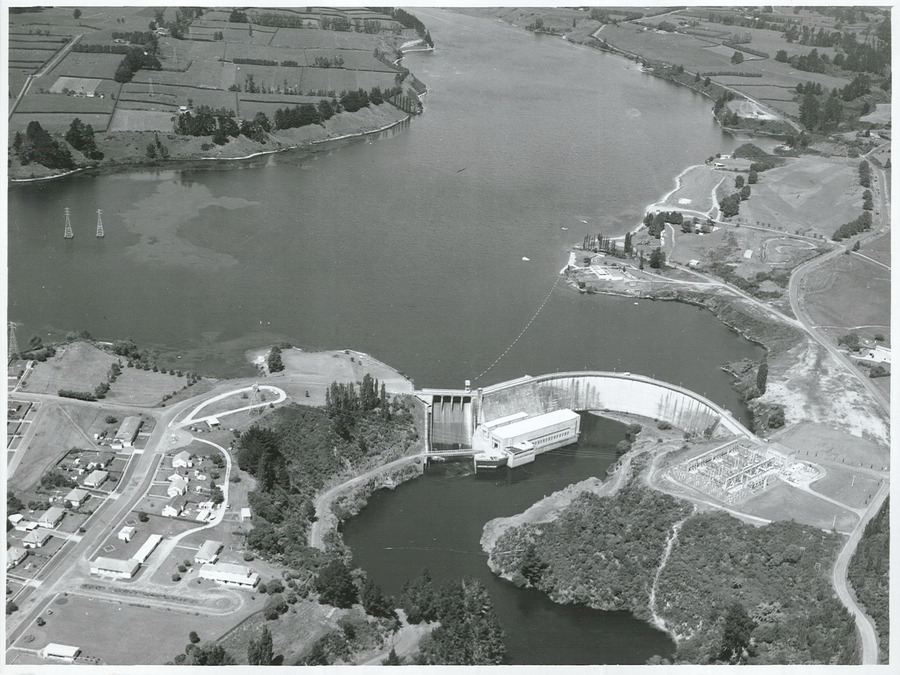
Karapiro Dam and Lake Karapiro in February 1969.

Lake Karapiro (Māori: Karāpiro) is an artificial reservoir lake on the Waikato River at Karapiro, 8 kilometres (5.0 mi) south-east of Cambridge in New Zealand's North Island. The lake was formed in 1947 by the damming of the Waikato River to store water for the 96-megawatt Karapiro power station. The lake is also one of two premier rowing venues in New Zealand (alongside Lake Ruataniwha in Canterbury) and is the base for the country's high-performance rowing programme.

== History and etymology ==
In about 1600, Te Ihingarangi built a pā (fortified village) called Te Tiki o Ihingarangi near where Lake Karapiro is today.

In 1830, Ngāti Hauā defeated Ngāti Maru in a battle at Taumatawīwī, two kilometres south of Karapiro Domain. On the orders of the Ngāti Hauā chief Te Waharoa, his dead warriors were cremated, this taking place on rocks beside the Waikato River, the location then becoming known as Karāpiro, from the Māori language words karā, meaning "basaltic stone", and piro, meaning "foul smelling". The site was flooded when the lake was created. The ten-megawatt Horahora Power Station, 13 km upstream of Karapiro Dam was also flooded with the formation of Lake Karapiro.

Construction of the Karapiro Dam began in 1940, however progress was slow due to labour and material shortages related to World War II. The dam was completed in early 1947, four years behind schedule. Due to the post-war electricity shortages, the filling of Lake Karapiro had to be coordinated to minimise the time between Horahora's decommissioning and Karapiro's commissioning. The lake level reached Horahora on 4 April 1947 upon which Horahora stopped generating and was submerged. The lake was sufficiently filled on 10 April 1947 to allow the first turbine-generator at Karapiro to enter service.

== Rowing venue ==
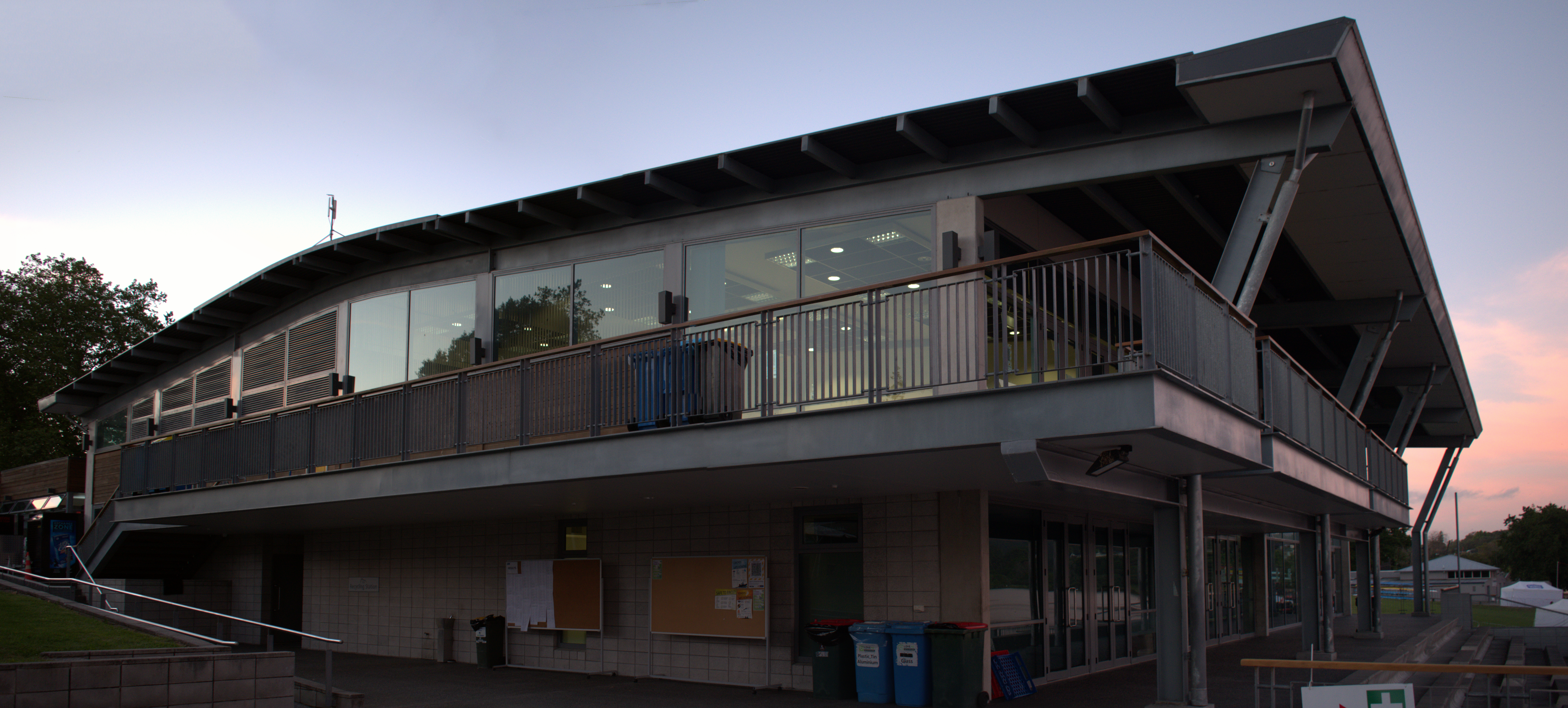
Sir Don Rowlands Centre

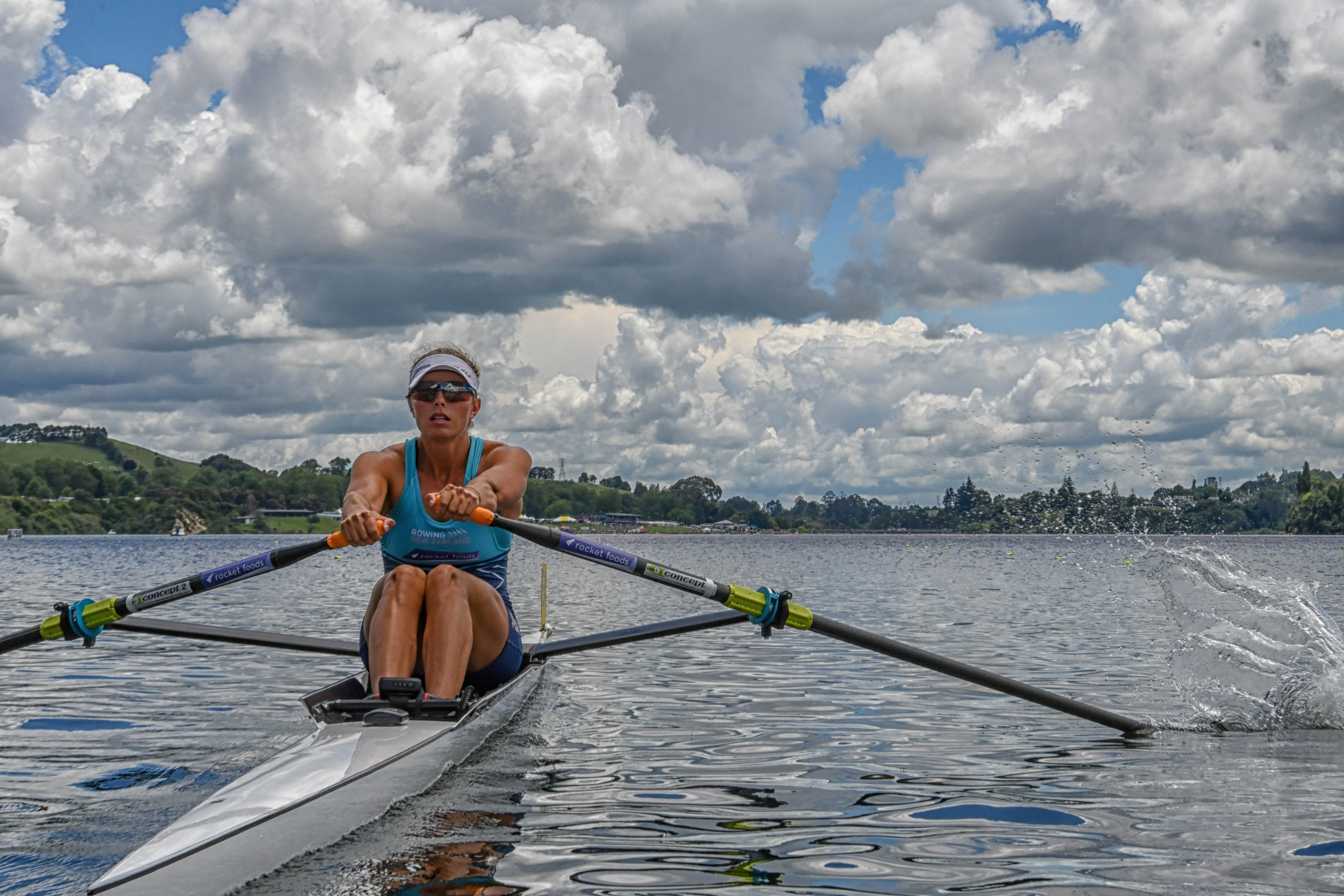
Hannah Osborne at the 2018 Christmas Regatta

The lake, regarded as one of New Zealand's best rowing venues, hosted the World Rowing Championships in 1978 and 2010, as well as the rowing events for the 1950 British Empire Games. The national rowing championships, then called the Dominion championships, were first held on the lake in 1949. Since the 1980s, Lake Karapiro alternates with the South Island's Lake Ruataniwha in hosting the New Zealand national rowing championships and the New Zealand secondary school rowing championships (Maadi Cup). Rowers who train on the lake mostly live in nearby Cambridge.

An International Rowing Federation inspection panel visited Lake Karapiro in March 2006 and said in its report that it was one of the fairest courses in the world they had seen and that the lake was one of the most picturesque in the world.

The lake hosted the 2010 Rowing World Championships. The purpose-built Sir Don Rowlands Centre was completed in June 2010, prior to the event.

== Hydroelectric power ==
The 96-megawatt Karapiro Power Station is located adjacent to the dam at the northern end of the lake, and is the eighth and last hydroelectric power station located on the Waikato River. Water taken from the lake is passed through three Kaplan turbines in the powerhouse, before being deposited into the lower Waikato River. Each turbine turns a 32 MW generator, and the electricity from the generators is fed into Transpower's national grid. The station is a base load generator due to its need to maintain water flows into the Waikato River system beyond the lake.

Lake Karapiro from the Sir Don Rowlands Centre

== Invasive species ==
Lake Karapiro is infested with hornwort, a submerged macrophyte from North America that is ranked as the worst submerged macrophyte in New Zealand. This plant is an unwanted organism under the Biosecurity Act 1993.

More recently, the lake was the first site where gold clams were detected in New Zealand, in May 2023. The gold clam grows and breeds very quickly, and can alter an ecosystem by reducing the majority of the phytoplankton, excreting a lot of nitrogen and phosphorus, and physically dominating the available space on the river or lakebed. Despite this, the lake is still open for recreation, making it a threat to other waterways because people may unknowingly spread golden clams on their watercraft. It has been added to the unwanted organism register.

== Climate ==
Climate data for Lake Karapiro (1991–2020)
Month	Jan	Feb	Mar	Apr	May	Jun	Jul	Aug	Sep	Oct	Nov	Dec	Year
Mean daily maximum °C (°F)	24.4 (75.9)	24.8 (76.6)	23.0 (73.4)	19.9 (67.8)	16.9 (62.4)	14.3 (57.7)	13.5 (56.3)	14.6 (58.3)	16.0 (60.8)	18.0 (64.4)	20.0 (68.0)	22.5 (72.5)	19.0 (66.2)
Daily mean °C (°F)	19.4 (66.9)	20.0 (68.0)	18.2 (64.8)	15.5 (59.9)	12.8 (55.0)	10.4 (50.7)	9.6 (49.3)	10.6 (51.1)	12.0 (53.6)	13.8 (56.8)	15.5 (59.9)	18.0 (64.4)	14.7 (58.4)
Mean daily minimum °C (°F)	14.5 (58.1)	15.1 (59.2)	13.4 (56.1)	11.0 (51.8)	8.8 (47.8)	6.6 (43.9)	5.7 (42.3)	6.5 (43.7)	8.0 (46.4)	9.6 (49.3)	11.0 (51.8)	13.6 (56.5)	10.3 (50.6)
Average rainfall mm (inches)	77.4 (3.05)	66.2 (2.61)	66.6 (2.62)	97.5 (3.84)	100.4 (3.95)	113.5 (4.47)	124.0 (4.88)	113.9 (4.48)	99.5 (3.92)	85.1 (3.35)	79.2 (3.12)	95.2 (3.75)	1,118.5 (44.04)
Source: NIWA
