= Sonia Sotomayor =

US Supreme Court justice since 2009

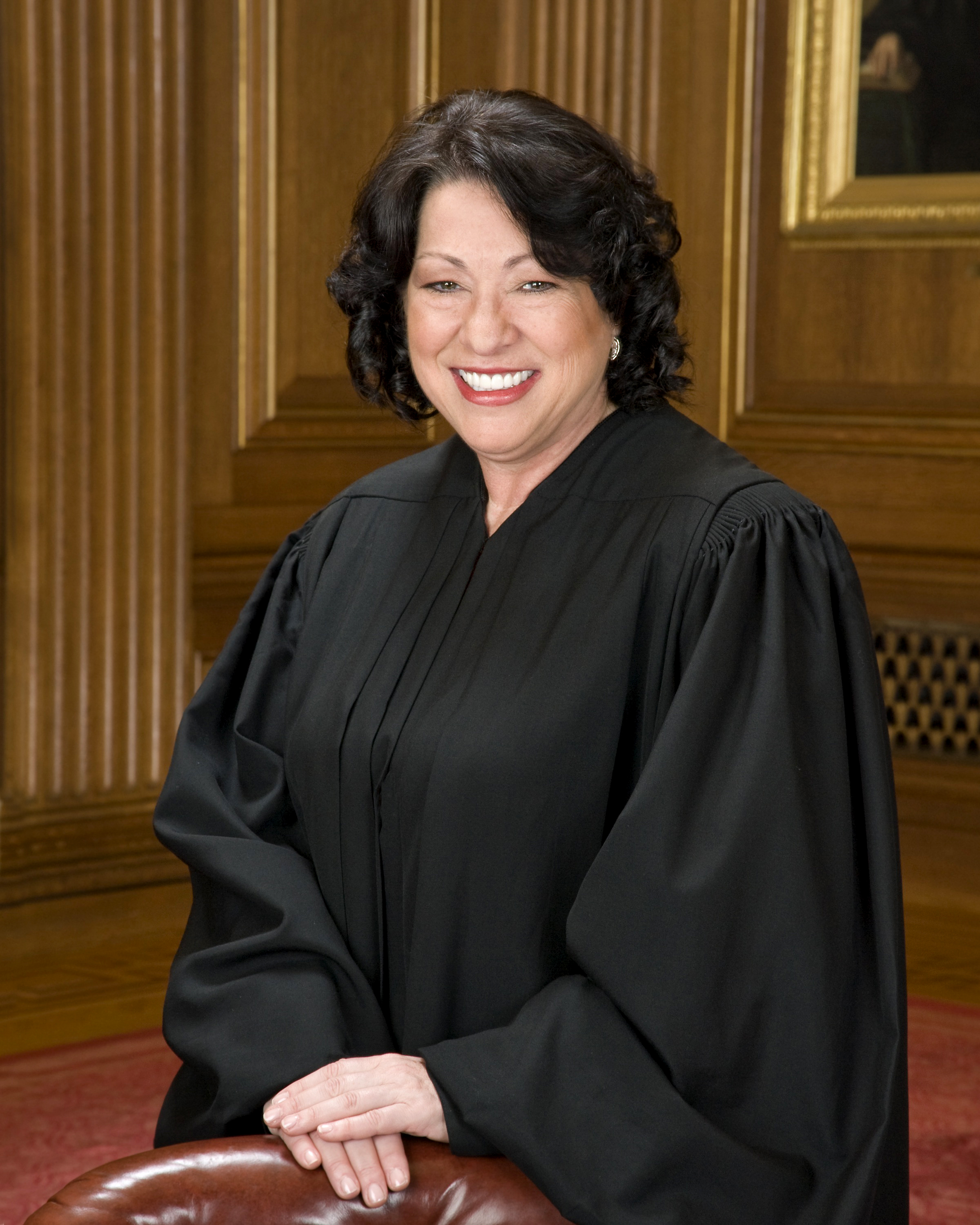
- Official portrait, 2009

Associate Justice of the Supreme Court of the United States
- Incumbent
- Assumed office August 8, 2009
- Nominated by: Barack Obama
- Preceded by: David Souter

Judge of the United States Court of Appeals for the Second Circuit
- In office October 7, 1998 – August 6, 2009
- Nominated by: Bill Clinton
- Preceded by: J. Daniel Mahoney
- Succeeded by: Raymond Lohier

Judge of the United States District Court for the Southern District of New York
- In office August 12, 1992 – October 7, 1998
- Nominated by: George H. W. Bush
- Preceded by: John M. Walker Jr.
- Succeeded by: Victor Marrero

Personal details
- Born: Sonia Maria Sotomayor; June 25, 1954 (age 72) New York City, U.S.
- Spouse: Kevin Noonan (m. 1976; div. 1983)
- Education: Princeton University (BA); Yale University (JD)
- Sonia Sotomayor's voice Sonia Sotomayor delivers the opinion of the Court in Yegiazaryan v. Smagin. Recorded June 22, 2023

Sonia Maria Sotomayor (/ˈsoʊnjə ˌsoʊtoʊmaɪˈjɔːr/, Spanish: [ˈsonja sotomaˈʝoɾ]; born June 25, 1954) is an American lawyer and jurist who serves as an associate justice of the Supreme Court of the United States. She was nominated by President Barack Obama on May 26, 2009, and has served since August 8, 2009. She is the third woman U.S. Supreme Court justice.

Sotomayor was born in the Bronx, New York City, to Puerto Rican-born parents. Her father died when she was nine years old, and she was subsequently raised by her mother. She graduated with high honors from Princeton University in 1976 and received her Juris Doctor in 1979 from Yale Law School, where she was an editor of the Yale Law Journal. She worked as an assistant district attorney in New York for four and a half years before entering private practice in 1984. She played an active role on the boards of directors for the Puerto Rican Legal Defense and Education Fund, the State of New York Mortgage Agency, and the New York City Campaign Finance Board.

President George H. W. Bush nominated Sotomayor to the U.S. District Court for the Southern District of New York in 1991; she was confirmed in 1992. In 1997, President Bill Clinton nominated her to the U.S. Court of Appeals for the Second Circuit. That appointment was slowed by the Republican majority in the United States Senate because of its concerns that the position might lead to a Supreme Court nomination, but she was confirmed in 1998. On the Second Circuit, Sotomayor heard appeals in more than 3,000 cases and wrote about 380 opinions. Sotomayor has taught at the New York University School of Law and Columbia Law School.

In May 2009, President Obama nominated Sotomayor to the Supreme Court following Justice David Souter's retirement. Her nomination was confirmed by the Senate in August 2009 by a vote of 68–31. While on the Court, Sotomayor has supported the informal liberal bloc of justices when they divide along the commonly perceived ideological lines. During her Supreme Court tenure, Sotomayor has been identified with concern for the rights of criminal defendants and criminal justice reform, as demonstrated in majority opinions such as J. D. B. v. North Carolina and Glossip v. Oklahoma. She is also known for her impassioned dissents on issues of race and ethnic identity, including in Schuette v. BAMN, Utah v. Strieff, and Trump v. Hawaii.

== Early life ==
Sotomayor was born in the New York City borough of the Bronx. Her father was Juan Sotomayor (c. 1921–1964), from the area of Santurce, San Juan, Puerto Rico, and her mother was Celina Báez (1927–2021), an orphan from Santa Rosa in Lajas, a rural area on Puerto Rico's southwest coast.

The two left Puerto Rico separately, met, and married during World War II after Celina served in the Women's Army Corps. Juan Sotomayor had a third-grade education, did not speak English, and worked as a tool and die worker; Celina Báez worked as a telephone operator and then a practical nurse. Sonia's younger brother, Juan Sotomayor, became a physician and university professor in the Syracuse, New York, area.

Sotomayor was raised Catholic and grew up in Puerto Rican communities in the South Bronx and East Bronx; she has called herself a "Nuyorican". The family lived in a South Bronx tenement before moving in 1957 to the well-maintained, racially and ethnically mixed, working-class Bronxdale Houses housing project in Soundview (which has over time been thought as part of both the East Bronx and South Bronx). In 2010, the Bronxdale Houses were renamed in her honor. Her relative proximity to Yankee Stadium led to her becoming a lifelong fan of the New York Yankees. The extended family got together frequently and regularly visited Puerto Rico during summers.

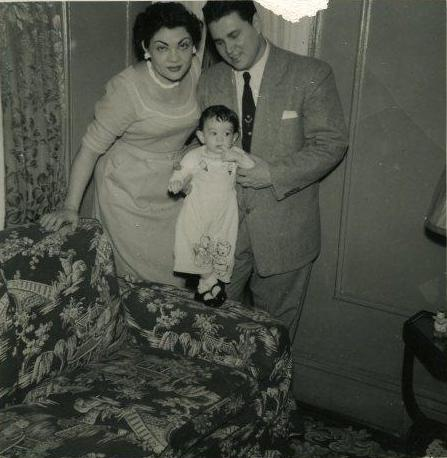
Sotomayor and her parents

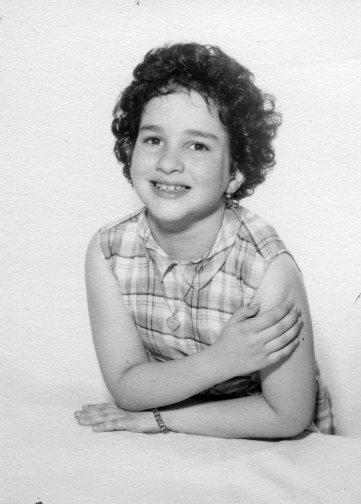
Sotomayor as a young girl

Sotomayor grew up with an alcoholic father and an emotionally distant mother; she felt closest to her grandmother, who she later said was a source of "protection and purpose". Sotomayor was diagnosed with type 1 diabetes at age seven and began taking daily insulin injections. Her father died of heart problems at age 42, when she was nine years old. After that, she became fluent in English. Celina Sotomayor put great stress on the value of education; she bought the Encyclopædia Britannica for her children, something unusual in the housing projects. Despite the distance between the two, which became greater after her father's death and which was not fully reconciled until decades later, Sotomayor has credited her mother with being her "life inspiration".

=== Education ===
For grammar school, Sotomayor attended Blessed Sacrament School in Soundview, where she was valedictorian and had a near-perfect attendance record. Although underage, Sotomayor worked at a local retail store and a hospital. She has said that she was first inspired by the strong-willed children's book detective character Nancy Drew, but, after her diabetes diagnosis led her doctors to suggest a different career path, she was inspired by the TV series Perry Mason to pursue a legal career and become a judge. She reflected in 1998: "I was going to college and I was going to become an attorney, and I knew that when I was ten. Ten. That's no jest."

Sotomayor passed the entrance tests for and then attended Cardinal Spellman High School in the Bronx. At Cardinal Spellman, she was on the forensics team (an American public-speaking competition) and was elected to the student government. She graduated as valedictorian in 1972. Meanwhile, the Bronxdale Houses had fallen victim to increasing heroin use, crime, and the emergence of the Black Spades gang. In 1970, the family found refuge by moving to Co-op City in the Northeast Bronx.

==== College and law school ====
Sotomayor attended Princeton University. She has said she was admitted in part due to her achievements in high school and in part because affirmative action made up for her standardized test scores, which she said were "not comparable to her colleagues at Princeton and Yale". She later said that there are cultural biases built into such testing and praised affirmative action for fulfilling "its purpose: to create the conditions whereby students from disadvantaged backgrounds could be brought to the starting line of a race many were unaware was even being run."

Sotomayor has described her time at Princeton as life-changing. Initially, she felt like "a visitor landing in an alien country". Princeton had few female students and fewer Latinos (about 20). She was too intimidated to ask questions during her freshman year; her writing and vocabulary skills were weak and she lacked knowledge in the classics. She put in long hours in the library and worked over summers with a professor outside of class, and gained skills, knowledge, and confidence. She became a moderate student activist and co-chair of the Acción Puertorriqueña organization, which served as a social and political hub and sought more opportunities for Puerto Rican students. She worked in the admissions office, traveling to high schools and lobbying on behalf of her best prospects.

As a student activist, Sotomayor focused on faculty hiring and curriculum, since Princeton did not have a single full-time Latino professor nor any class on Latin American studies. A meeting with university president William G. Bowen in her sophomore year saw no results, with Sotomayor telling a New York Times reporter at the time, "Princeton is following a policy of benign neutrality and is not making substantive efforts to change." She also wrote opinion pieces for the Daily Princetonian addressing those issues. In April 1974, Acción Puertorriqueña filed a formal letter of complaint with the Department of Health, Education and Welfare, saying the school discriminated in its hiring and admission practices. The university began to hire Latino faculty, and Sotomayor established an ongoing dialogue with Bowen.

Sotomayor also persuaded professor Peter Winn, who specialized in Latin American history, to create a seminar on Puerto Rican history and politics. She joined the governance board of Princeton's Third World Center and served on the university's student–faculty Discipline Committee, which issued rulings on student infractions. She also ran an after-school program for local children and volunteered as an interpreter for Latino patients at Trenton Psychiatric Hospital.

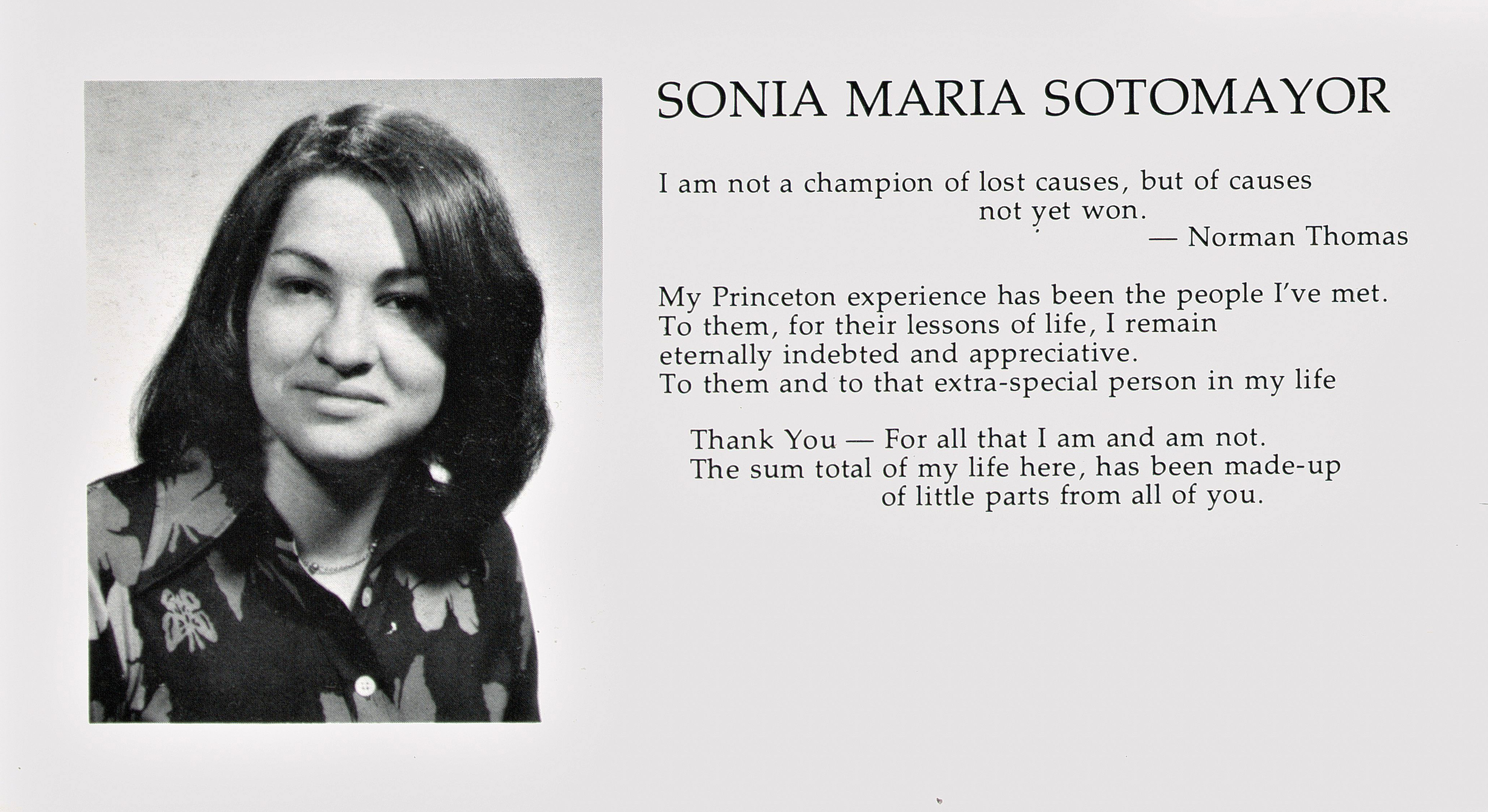
Sotomayor in the Princeton University yearbook, 1976

Academically, Sotomayor stumbled in her first year at Princeton, but she received almost all A grades in her final two years of college. She wrote her senior thesis on Luis Muñoz Marín, the first democratically elected governor of Puerto Rico, and on the territory's struggles for economic and political self-determination. The 178-page work, "La Historia Ciclica de Puerto Rico: The Impact of the Life of Luis Muñoz Marin on the Political and Economic History of Puerto Rico, 1930–1975", won honorable mention for the Latin American Studies Thesis Prize. As a senior, Sotomayor won the Pyne Prize, the top award for undergraduates, which reflects both strong grades and extracurricular activities. In 1976, she was elected to Phi Beta Kappa and graduated summa cum laude with an A.B. in history. She was influenced by critical race theory, which is reflected in her later speeches and writings.

Sotomayor entered Yale Law School in 1976. While she believes she again benefited from affirmative action to compensate for relatively low standardized test scores, a former Yale dean of admissions has said that given her record at Princeton, it probably had little effect. She fit in well at Yale, though she found there were few Latino students. She was known as a hard worker but not considered among the star students in her class. Yale General Counsel and professor José A. Cabranes acted as a mentor to help her work within "the system".

Sotomayor became an editor of the Yale Law Journal, and was also managing editor of the student-run Yale Studies in World Public Order publication (later known as the Yale Journal of International Law). She published a law review note on the effect of possible Puerto Rican statehood on the island's mineral and ocean rights. She was a semifinalist in the Barristers Union mock trial competition. She co-chaired a group for Latin, Asian, and Native American students, and continued to advocate for the hiring of more Hispanic faculty.

After her second year, Sotomayor took a job as a summer associate with the prominent New York law firm Paul, Weiss, Rifkind, Wharton & Garrison. By her own later account, her performance there was lacking. She did not receive an offer for a full-time position, an experience she later called a "kick in the teeth" and one that bothered her for years. In her third year, she filed a formal complaint against the established Washington, D.C., law firm Shaw, Pittman, Potts & Trowbridge when lawyers from the firm suggested during a recruiting dinner that she was at Yale only because of affirmative action. Sotomayor refused to be further interviewed by the firm and filed her complaint with a faculty–student tribunal, which ruled in her favor. Her action triggered a campus-wide debate and news of the firm's December 1978 apology made The Washington Post.

In 1979, Sotomayor was awarded a Juris Doctor from Yale Law School. She was admitted to the New York Bar the next year.

== Early legal career ==
On Cabranes's recommendation, Sotomayor was hired out of law school as an assistant district attorney under New York County District Attorney Robert Morgenthau, starting in 1979. She said at the time that she took the job with mixed emotions: "There was a tremendous amount of pressure from my community, from the third-world community, at Yale. They could not understand why I was taking this job. I'm not sure I've ever resolved that problem."

During that time, New York had visible drug problems, and Morgenthau's staff was prosecuting many crimes. Like other rookie prosecutors, Sotomayor was initially apprehensive about appearing before judges. Working in the trial division, she prosecuted a variety of cases, including shoplifting, prostitution, robberies, assaults, and murders. She also worked on cases involving police brutality.

In the courtroom, she was effective at cross-examination and at simplifying a case in ways juries could understand. In 1983, she helped convict Richard Maddicks (the "Tarzan Murderer"), who acrobatically entered apartments, robbed them, and shot residents. She felt lower-level crimes were largely products of environment and poverty but had a different attitude about serious felonies: "No matter how liberal I am, I'm still outraged by crimes of violence. Regardless of whether I can sympathize with the causes that lead these individuals to do these crimes, the effects are outrageous." Hispanic-on-Hispanic crime was a particular concern: "The saddest crimes for me were the ones that my own people committed against each other."

In general, Sotomayor expressed a passion for law and order. She worked 15-hour days and gained a reputation for drive, preparedness, and fairness. One performance review called her a "potential superstar". Morgenthau later described her as "smart, hard-working, [and having] a lot of common sense" and as a "fearless and effective prosecutor". She stayed in the post for a typical length of time and had a common reaction to the job: "After a while, you forget there are decent, law-abiding people in life."

Sotomayor married Kevin Edward Noonan in 1976, and they divorced amicably in 1983; they had no children. She said that the pressures of her working life were a contributing factor, but not the major factor, in the breakup. From 1983 to 1986, Sotomayor had an informal solo practice, dubbed Sotomayor & Associates, located in her Brooklyn apartment. She performed legal consulting, often for friends or family members.

In 1984, Sotomayor entered private practice, joining the commercial litigation practice group Pavia & Harcourt in Manhattan as an associate. One of 30 attorneys, she specialized in intellectual property litigation, international law, and arbitration. She later said, "I wanted to complete myself as an attorney." Although she had no civil litigation experience, the firm recruited her heavily and she learned on the job. She was eager to try cases and argue in court, rather than join a larger firm.

Her clients were mostly international corporations doing business in the United States; one focus was suing counterfeiters of Fendi goods. In some cases, Sotomayor went on site with police to Harlem or Chinatown to seize illegitimate merchandise, in the latter instance pursuing a fleeing culprit while riding a motorcycle. She said at the time that Pavia & Harcourt was run "much like a drug operation", and the successful rounding up of thousands of counterfeit accessories in 1986 was celebrated by "Fendi Crush", a destruction-by-garbage-truck event at Tavern on the Green.

At other times, she dealt with legal issues such as grain export contract disputes. In a 1986 appearance on Good Morning America that profiled women ten years after college graduation, she said that the bulk of legal work was drudgery, and that while she was content with her life, she had expected greater things of herself coming out of college. In 1988 she became a partner; she left in 1992 to become a judge.

In addition to her law firm work, Sotomayor undertook visible public service roles. She was not connected to the party bosses who typically picked judges in New York, and registered as an independent. Morgenthau served as her patron. In 1987, Governor Mario Cuomo appointed Sotomayor to the board of the State of New York Mortgage Agency, where she served until 1992. As part of one of the largest urban rebuilding efforts in U.S. history, the agency helped low-income people acquire home mortgages and provide insurance for housing and hospice for AIDS sufferers. Sotomayor was the youngest member of a board composed of strong personalities and involved herself in operational details. She vocally supported the right to affordable housing, directing more funds to lower-income home owners, and expressed skepticism about gentrification, although she voted in favor of most projects.

In 1988, Mayor Ed Koch appointed Sotomayor as one of the founding members of the New York City Campaign Finance Board, where she served for four years. There she took a role in the board's implementation of a voluntary scheme whereby local candidates received public matching funds in exchange for limits on contributions and spending and agreeing to greater financial disclosure. Sotomayor showed no patience with candidates who failed to follow regulations and was a stickler for making campaigns follow them. She joined in rulings that fined, audited, or reprimanded the mayoral campaigns of Koch, David Dinkins, and Rudy Giuliani.

Based upon another recommendation from Cabranes, Sotomayor served on the board of directors of the Puerto Rican Legal Defense and Education Fund from 1980 to 1992. There she was a policymaker who worked actively with the organization's lawyers on issues such as New York City hiring practices, police brutality, the death penalty, and voting rights. The group achieved its most visible triumph when it blocked a city primary election on the grounds that New York City Council boundaries diminished minority voters' power.

During 1985 and 1986, Sotomayor served on the board of the Maternity Center Association, a Manhattan-based nonprofit that focused on improving maternity care.

== Federal district judge ==
=== Nomination and confirmation ===
Sotomayor had wanted to be a judge since she was in elementary school, and in 1991, Senator Daniel Patrick Moynihan, a Democrat, recommended her for a judgeship. Moynihan had an unusual bipartisan arrangement with his fellow New York senator Al D'Amato, a Republican, whereby he chose roughly one out of every four New York district court seats even though a Republican was in the White House. Moynihan also wanted to fulfill a public promise he had made to get a Hispanic judge appointed for New York. When Moynihan's staff recommended Sotomayor, they said, "Have we got a judge for you!" Moynihan identified with her socioeconomic and academic background and became convinced she would become the first Hispanic Supreme Court justice. D'Amato enthusiastically backed Sotomayor, who was seen as politically centrist at the time. Of the impending drop in salary from private practice, Sotomayor said: "I've never wanted to get adjusted to my income because I knew I wanted to go back to public service. And in comparison to what my mother earns and how I was raised, it's not modest at all."

On November 27, 1991, President George H. W. Bush nominated Sotomayor to a seat on the U.S. District Court for the Southern District of New York vacated by John M. Walker Jr. Senate Judiciary Committee hearings, led by a friendly Democratic majority, went smoothly for her in June 1992, with her pro bono activities winning praise from Senator Ted Kennedy and unanimous approval from the committee. Then a Republican senator blocked her nomination and that of three others for a while in retaliation for an unrelated block Democrats had put on another nominee. D'Amato objected strongly; some weeks later, the block was dropped, and Sotomayor was confirmed by unanimous consent of the full Senate on August 11 and received her commission the next day.

Sotomayor became the youngest judge in the Southern District and the first Hispanic federal judge in New York State. She became the first Puerto Rican woman to serve as a judge in a U.S. federal court. She was one of seven women among the district's 58 judges. She moved from Carroll Gardens, Brooklyn, back to the Bronx in order to live within her district.

=== Judgeship ===
Sotomayor generally kept a low public profile as a district court judge. She showed a willingness to take anti-government positions in a number of cases, and during her first year in the seat, she received high ratings from liberal public-interest groups. Other sources and organizations regarded her as a centrist during this period. In criminal cases, she gained a reputation for tough sentencing and was not viewed as a pro-defense judge. A Syracuse University study found that in such cases, Sotomayor generally handed out longer sentences than her colleagues, especially when white-collar crime was involved. Fellow district judge Miriam Goldman Cedarbaum was an influence on Sotomayor in adopting a narrow, "just the facts" approach to judicial decision-making.

As a trial judge, she garnered a reputation for being well-prepared for cases and moving them along a tight schedule. Lawyers before her court viewed her as plain-spoken, intelligent, demanding, and sometimes somewhat unforgiving; one said, "She does not have much patience for people trying to snow her. You can't do it."

=== Notable rulings ===
On March 30, 1995, in Silverman v. Major League Baseball Player Relations Committee, Inc., Sotomayor issued a preliminary injunction against Major League Baseball, preventing it from unilaterally implementing a new collective bargaining agreement and using replacement players. Her ruling ended the 1994 baseball strike after 232 days, the day before the new season was scheduled to begin. The Second Circuit upheld Sotomayor's decision and denied the owners' request to stay the ruling. The decision raised her profile, won her the plaudits of baseball fans, and had a lasting effect on the game. In the preparatory phase of the case, Sotomayor told the lawyers on both sides, "I hope none of you assumed ... that my lack of knowledge of any of the intimate details of your dispute meant I was not a baseball fan. You can't grow up in the South Bronx without knowing about baseball."

In Dow Jones v. Department of Justice (1995), Sotomayor sided with the Wall Street Journal in its efforts to obtain and publish a photocopy of the last note left by former Deputy White House Counsel Vince Foster. She ruled that the public had "a substantial interest" in the note and enjoined the U.S. Justice Department from blocking its release.

In New York Times Co. v. Tasini (1997), freelance journalists sued the New York Times Company for copyright infringement for The New York Times's inclusion in an electronic archival database (LexisNexis) of the work of freelancers it had published. Sotomayor ruled that the publisher had the right to license the freelancers' work. This decision was reversed on appeal, and the Supreme Court upheld the reversal; two dissenters, John Paul Stevens and Stephen Breyer, took Sotomayor's position.

In Castle Rock Entertainment, Inc. v. Carol Publishing Group (also in 1997), Sotomayor ruled that a book of trivia from the television program Seinfeld infringed on the copyright of the show's producer and did not constitute legal fair use. The United States Court of Appeals for the Second Circuit upheld Sotomayor's ruling.

== Court of Appeals judge ==
=== Nomination and confirmation ===
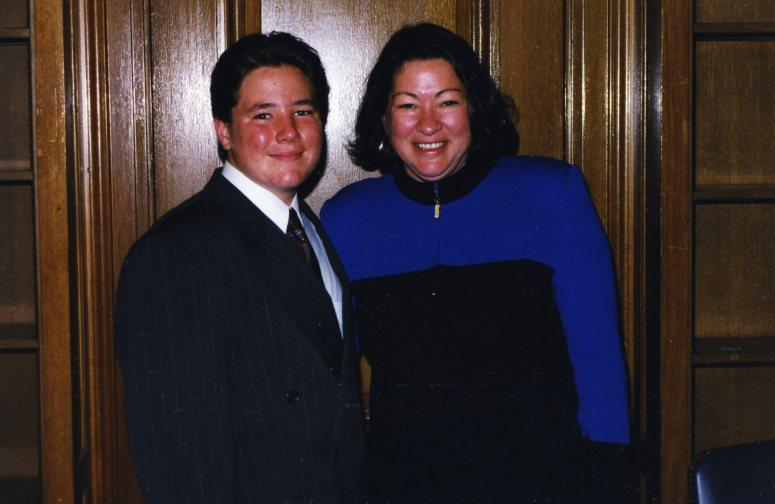
Judge Sonia Sotomayor with her godson at the United States Court of Appeals signing ceremony in 1998

On June 25, 1997, President Bill Clinton nominated Sotomayor to a seat on the U.S. Court of Appeals for the Second Circuit vacated by J. Daniel Mahoney. Her nomination was initially expected to go smoothly, with the American Bar Association Standing Committee on the Federal Judiciary giving her a "well qualified" professional assessment.

But as The New York Times wrote, Sotomayor's nomination became "embroiled in the sometimes tortured judicial politics of the Senate." Some in the Republican majority believed Clinton was eager to name the first Hispanic Supreme Court justice and that an easy confirmation to the appeals court would put Sotomayor in a better position for a possible Supreme Court nomination (despite there being no vacancy at the time nor any indication the Clinton administration was considering nominating her or any Hispanic). Therefore, the Republican majority decided to slow her confirmation. Radio commentator Rush Limbaugh called Sotomayor an "ultraliberal" who was on a "rocket ship" to the Supreme Court.

During her September 1997 hearing before the Senate Judiciary Committee, Sotomayor parried strong questioning from some Republican members about mandatory sentencing, gay rights, and her level of respect for Supreme Court Justice Clarence Thomas. The committee approved her nomination in March 1998, with two dissensions. But in June 1998, the Wall Street Journal editorial page wrote that the Clinton administration intended to "get her on to the Second Circuit, then elevate her to the Supreme Court as soon as an opening occurs"; the editorial criticized two of her district court rulings and urged further delay of her confirmation. The Republican block continued.

Ranking Democratic committee member Patrick Leahy objected to Republican use of a secret hold to slow Sotomayor's nomination, and attributed that anonymous tactic to reticence about publicly opposing a female Hispanic nominee. The previous month, Leahy had triggered a procedural delay in the confirmation of fellow Second Circuit nominee Chester J. Straub—whom, although advanced by Clinton and supported by Moynihan, Republicans considered much more acceptable—in an unsuccessful effort to force earlier consideration of Sotomayor's nomination.

During 1998, several Hispanic organizations organized a petition drive in New York State, generating hundreds of signatures from New Yorkers to try to convince D'Amato to push the Senate leadership to bring Sotomayor's nomination to a vote. A backer of Sotomayor who was concerned about his reelection that year, D'Amato helped move the leadership. Sotomayor's nomination had been pending for over a year when Majority Leader Trent Lott scheduled the vote. With complete Democratic support and support from 25 Republicans, including Judiciary Chair Orrin Hatch, Sotomayor was confirmed on October 2, 1998, by a 67–29 vote. She received her commission on October 7.

The confirmation experience left Sotomayor somewhat angry; she said shortly afterward that during the hearings, Republicans had inferred her political beliefs from her being Latina: "That series of questions, I think, were symbolic of a set of expectations that some people had [that] I must be liberal. It is stereotyping, and stereotyping is perhaps the most insidious of all problems in our society today."

=== Judgeship ===
Over her 10 years on the Second Circuit, Sotomayor heard appeals in more than 3,000 cases and wrote about 380 majority opinions. The Supreme Court reviewed five of those, reversing three and affirming two—not high numbers for an appellate judge of that many years and a typical percentage of reversals.

Sotomayor's circuit court rulings led to her being considered a political centrist by the ABA Journal and other sources and organizations. Several lawyers, legal experts, and news organizations identified her as someone with liberal inclinations. The Second Circuit's caseload typically skewed more toward business and securities law rather than hot-button social or constitutional issues. Sotomayor tended to write narrow, practiced rulings that relied on close application of the law to the facts of a case rather than general philosophical viewpoints. A Congressional Research Service analysis found that her rulings defied easy ideological categorization, but did show adherence to precedent and avoidance of overstepping the circuit court's judicial role. Unusually, Sotomayor read through all the supporting documents of cases under review; her lengthy rulings explored every aspect of a case and tended to feature leaden, ungainly prose. Some legal experts have said that her attention to detail and re-examination of the facts of a case came close to overstepping the traditional role of appellate judges.

Across some 150 cases involving business and civil law, Sotomayor's rulings were generally unpredictable and not consistently pro-business or anti-business. Sotomayor's influence on the federal judiciary, as measured by the number of citations of her rulings by other judges and in law review articles, increased significantly during the length of her appellate judgeship and was greater than that of some other prominent federal appeals court judges. Two academic studies showed that the proportion of Sotomayor's decisions that overrode policy decisions by elected branches was the same as or lower than that of other circuit judges.

Sotomayor was a member of the Second Circuit Task Force on Gender, Racial and Ethnic Fairness in the Courts. In October 2001, she presented the annual Judge Mario G. Olmos Memorial Lecture at UC Berkeley School of Law; titled "A Latina Judge's Voice"; it was published in the Berkeley La Raza Law Journal in 2002. In the speech, she discussed the characteristics of her Latina upbringing and culture and the history of minorities and women ascending to the federal bench. She said the low number of minority women on the federal bench at that time was "shocking". She then discussed at length how her own experiences as a Latina might affect her decisions as a judge. In any case, her background in activism did not necessarily influence her rulings: in a study of 50 racial discrimination cases brought before her panel, 45 were rejected, with Sotomayor never filing a dissent. An expanded study showed that Sotomayor decided 97 cases involving a claim of discrimination and rejected those claims nearly 90 percent of the time. Another examination of Second Circuit split decisions on cases that dealt with race and discrimination showed no clear ideological pattern in Sotomayor's opinions.

On the Court of Appeals, Sotomayor gained a reputation for vigorous and blunt behavior toward lawyers, sometimes to the point of brusque and curt treatment or testy interruptions. She was known for extensive preparation for oral arguments and for running a "hot bench", where judges ask lawyers many questions. Unprepared lawyers suffered the consequences, but the vigorous questioning was an aid to lawyers seeking to tailor their arguments to the judge's concerns. The 2009 Almanac of the Federal Judiciary, which collected anonymous evaluations of judges by lawyers who appear before them, contained a wide range of reactions to Sotomayor. Comments also diverged among lawyers willing to be named. Attorney Sheema Chaudhry said, "She's brilliant and she's qualified, but I just feel that she can be very, how do you say, temperamental." Defense lawyer Gerald B. Lefcourt said, "She used her questioning to make a point, as opposed to really looking for an answer to a question she did not understand." In contrast, Second Circuit Judge Richard C. Wesley said his interactions with Sotomayor had been "totally antithetical to this perception that has gotten some traction that she is somehow confrontational." Second Circuit Judge and former teacher Guido Calabresi said his tracking showed that Sotomayor's questioning patterns were no different from those of other members of the court, adding, "Some lawyers just don't like to be questioned by a woman. [The criticism] was sexist, plain and simple." Sotomayor's law clerks regarded her as a valuable and strong mentor, and she said she viewed them like family.

In 2005, Senate Democrats suggested Sotomayor, among others, to President George W. Bush as an acceptable nominee to fill the seat of retiring Supreme Court Justice Sandra Day O'Connor.

=== Notable rulings ===
==== Abortion ====
In the 2002 decision Center for Reproductive Law and Policy v. Bush, Sotomayor upheld the Bush administration's implementation of the Mexico City Policy, which is that "the United States will no longer contribute to separate nongovernmental organizations which perform or actively promote abortion as a method of family planning in other nations." Sotomayor held that the policy did not constitute a violation of equal protection, as "the government is free to favor the anti-abortion position over the pro-choice position, and can do so with public funds."

==== First Amendment rights ====
In Pappas v. Giuliani (2002), Sotomayor dissented from her colleagues' ruling that the New York Police Department could terminate from his desk job an employee who sent racist materials through the mail. She argued that the First Amendment protected speech by the employee "away from the office, on [his] own time", even if that speech was "offensive, hateful, and insulting", and that therefore the employee's First Amendment claim should have gone to trial rather than being dismissed on summary judgment.

In 2005, Sotomayor wrote the opinion for United States v. Quattrone. Frank Quattrone had been on trial on charges of obstructing investigations related to technology IPOs. After his first trial ended in a deadlocked jury and a mistrial, some members of the media had wanted to publish the names of the jurors deciding the case, and a district court had issued an order barring the publication, even though their names had previously been disclosed in open court. In United States v. Quattrone, Sotomayor wrote the opinion for the Second Circuit panel striking down this order on First Amendment grounds, saying that the media was free to publish the names. Sotomayor held that although it was important to protect the fairness of the retrial, the district court's order was an unconstitutional prior restraint on free speech and violated the right of the press "to report freely on events that transpire in an open courtroom".

In 2008, Sotomayor was on a three-judge panel in Doninger v. Niehoff that unanimously affirmed, in an opinion by Second Circuit Judge Debra Livingston, the district court's judgment that Lewis S. Mills High School did not violate a student's First Amendment rights when it barred her from running for student government after she called the superintendent and other school officials "douchebags" in a blog post written while off-campus that encouraged students to call an administrator and "piss her off more". Livingston held that the district judge did not abuse her discretion in holding that the student's speech "foreseeably create[d] a risk of substantial disruption within the school environment", which is the precedent in the Second Circuit for when schools may regulate off-campus speech. Although Sotomayor did not write this opinion, she has been criticized by some who disagree with it.

==== Second Amendment rights ====
Sotomayor was part of the three-judge Second Circuit panel that affirmed the district court's ruling in Maloney v. Cuomo (2009). Maloney was arrested for possession of nunchucks, which at the time were illegal in New York; Maloney argued that this law violated his Second Amendment right to bear arms. The Second Circuit's per curiam opinion noted that the Supreme Court had not ever held that the Second Amendment is binding against state governments. On the contrary, in Presser v. Illinois (1886), the Supreme Court held that the Second Amendment "is a limitation only upon the power of Congress and the national government, and not upon that of the state". With respect to Presser v. Illinois, the panel said that only the Supreme Court has "the prerogative of overruling its own decisions", and the recent Supreme Court case District of Columbia v. Heller (which struck down the District's gun ban as unconstitutional) did "not invalidate this longstanding principle". The panel upheld the lower court's decision dismissing Maloney's challenge to New York's law against possession of nunchucks. On June 2, 2009, a Seventh Circuit panel, including the prominent and heavily cited judges Richard Posner and Frank Easterbrook, unanimously agreed with Maloney v. Cuomo, citing the case in their decision turning back a challenge to Chicago's gun laws and noting the Supreme Court precedents remain in force until altered by the Supreme Court itself.

==== Fourth Amendment rights ====
In N.G. & S.G. ex rel. S.C. v. Connecticut (2004), Sotomayor dissented from her colleagues' decision to uphold a series of strip searches of "troubled adolescent girls" in juvenile detention centers. While she agreed that some of the searches at issue in the case were lawful, she would have held that due to "the severely intrusive nature of strip searches", they should not be allowed "in the absence of individualized suspicion, of adolescents who have never been charged with a crime". She argued that an "individualized suspicion" rule was more consistent with Second Circuit precedent than the majority's ruling.

In Leventhal v. Knapek (2001), Sotomayor rejected a Fourth Amendment challenge by a U.S. Department of Transportation employee whose employer searched his office computer. She wrote, "Even though [the employee] had some expectation of privacy in the contents of his office computer, the investigatory searches by the DOT did not violate his Fourth Amendment rights" because "there were reasonable grounds to believe" that the search would reveal evidence of "work-related misconduct".

==== Alcohol in commerce ====
In 2004, Sotomayor was part of the judge panel that ruled in Swedenburg v. Kelly that New York's law prohibiting out-of-state wineries from shipping directly to New York consumers was constitutional even though in-state wineries were allowed to. The case, which invoked the 21st Amendment, was appealed and attached to another case. The case reached the Supreme Court later on as Swedenburg v. Kelly and was overruled in a 5–4 decision that found the law discriminatory and unconstitutional.

==== Employment discrimination ====
Sotomayor was involved in the high-profile case Ricci v. DeStefano, which initially upheld the City of New Haven's right to throw out its test for firefighters and start over with a new test because the city believed the test had a "disparate impact" on minority firefighters. (No black firefighters qualified for promotion under the test, whereas some had qualified under tests used in previous years.) The city was concerned that minority firefighters might sue under Title VII of the Civil Rights Act of 1964. The city chose not to certify the test results and a lower court had previously upheld the city's right to do this. Several white firefighters and one Hispanic firefighter who had passed the test, including the lead plaintiff, who has dyslexia and had put extra effort into studying, sued the City of New Haven, claiming that their rights were violated. A Second Circuit panel that included Sotomayor first issued a brief, unsigned summary order (not written by Sotomayor) affirming the lower court's ruling. Sotomayor's former mentor José A. Cabranes, by now a fellow judge on the court, objected to this handling and requested that the court hear it en banc. Sotomayor voted with a 7–6 majority not to rehear it, and a slightly expanded ruling was issued, but a strong dissent by Cabranes led to the case reaching the Supreme Court in 2009. There it was overruled in a 5–4 decision that found the white firefighters had been victims of racial discrimination when they were denied promotion.

==== Business ====
In Clarett v. National Football League (2004), Sotomayor upheld the National Football League's eligibility rules requiring players to wait three full seasons after high school graduation before entering the NFL draft. On antitrust grounds, Maurice Clarett challenged these rules, which were part of the collective bargaining agreement between the NFL and its players. Sotomayor held that Clarett's claim would upset the established "federal labor law favoring and governing the collective bargaining process".

In Merrill Lynch, Pierce, Fenner & Smith, Inc. v. Dabit (2005), Sotomayor wrote a unanimous opinion that the Securities Litigation Uniform Standards Act of 1998 did not preempt class action claims in state courts by stockbrokers alleging misleading inducement to buy or sell stocks. The Supreme Court handed down an 8–0 decision stating that the Act did preempt such claims, thereby overruling Sotomayor's decision.

In Specht v. Netscape Communications Corp. (2001), Sotomayor ruled that the license agreement of Netscape's Smart Download software did not constitute a binding contract because the system did not give the user "sufficient notice".

==== Civil rights ====
In Correctional Services Corp. v. Malesko (2000), Sotomayor, writing for the court, supported a person's right to sue a private corporation working on behalf of the federal government for alleged violations of that person's constitutional rights. Reversing a lower court decision, Sotomayor found that the Bivens doctrine—which allows suits against people working for the federal government for constitutional rights violations—could be applied to the case of a former prisoner seeking to sue the private company operating the federal halfway house facility in which he resided. The Supreme Court reversed Sotomayor's ruling in a 5–4 decision, saying that the Bivens doctrine could not be expanded to cover private entities working on behalf of the federal government. Justices Stevens, Souter, Ginsburg, and Breyer dissented, siding with Sotomayor's ruling.

In Gant v. Wallingford Board of Education (1999), the parents of a black student alleged that he had been harassed due to his race and had been discriminated against when he was transferred from a first grade class to a kindergarten class without parental consent while similarly situated white students were treated differently. Sotomayor agreed with the dismissal of the harassment claims due to lack of evidence, but would have allowed the discrimination claim to go forward. She wrote in dissent that the grade transfer was "contrary to the school's established policies" as well as its treatment of white students, which "supports the inference that race discrimination played a role".

==== Property rights ====
In Krimstock v. Kelly (2002), Sotomayor wrote an opinion halting New York City's practice of seizing the motor vehicles of drivers accused of driving while intoxicated and some other crimes and holding those vehicles for "months or even years" during criminal proceedings. Noting the importance of cars to many people's livelihoods or daily activities, she held that it violated people's due process rights to hold the vehicles without permitting the owners to challenge the city's continued possession of their property.

In Brody v. Village of Port Chester (2003 and 2005), a takings case, Sotomayor first ruled in 2003 for a unanimous panel that a property owner in Port Chester, New York, was permitted to challenge the state's Eminent Domain Procedure Law. A district court subsequently rejected the plaintiff's claims and upon appeal the case found itself again with the Second Circuit. In 2005, Sotomayor ruled with a panel majority that the property owner's due process rights had been violated by lack of adequate notice to him of his right to challenge a village order that his land should be used for a redevelopment project, but the panel supported the village's taking of the property for public use.

In Didden v. Village of Port Chester (2006), an unrelated case brought about by the same town's actions, Sotomayor joined a unanimous panel's summary order to uphold a trial court's dismissal—due to a statute of limitations lapse—of a property owner's objection to his land being condemned for a redevelopment project. The ruling further said that even without the lapse, the owner's petition would be denied due to application of the Supreme Court's recent Kelo v. City of New London ruling. The Second Circuit's reasoning drew criticism from libertarian commentators.

== Supreme Court justice ==
=== Nomination and confirmation ===
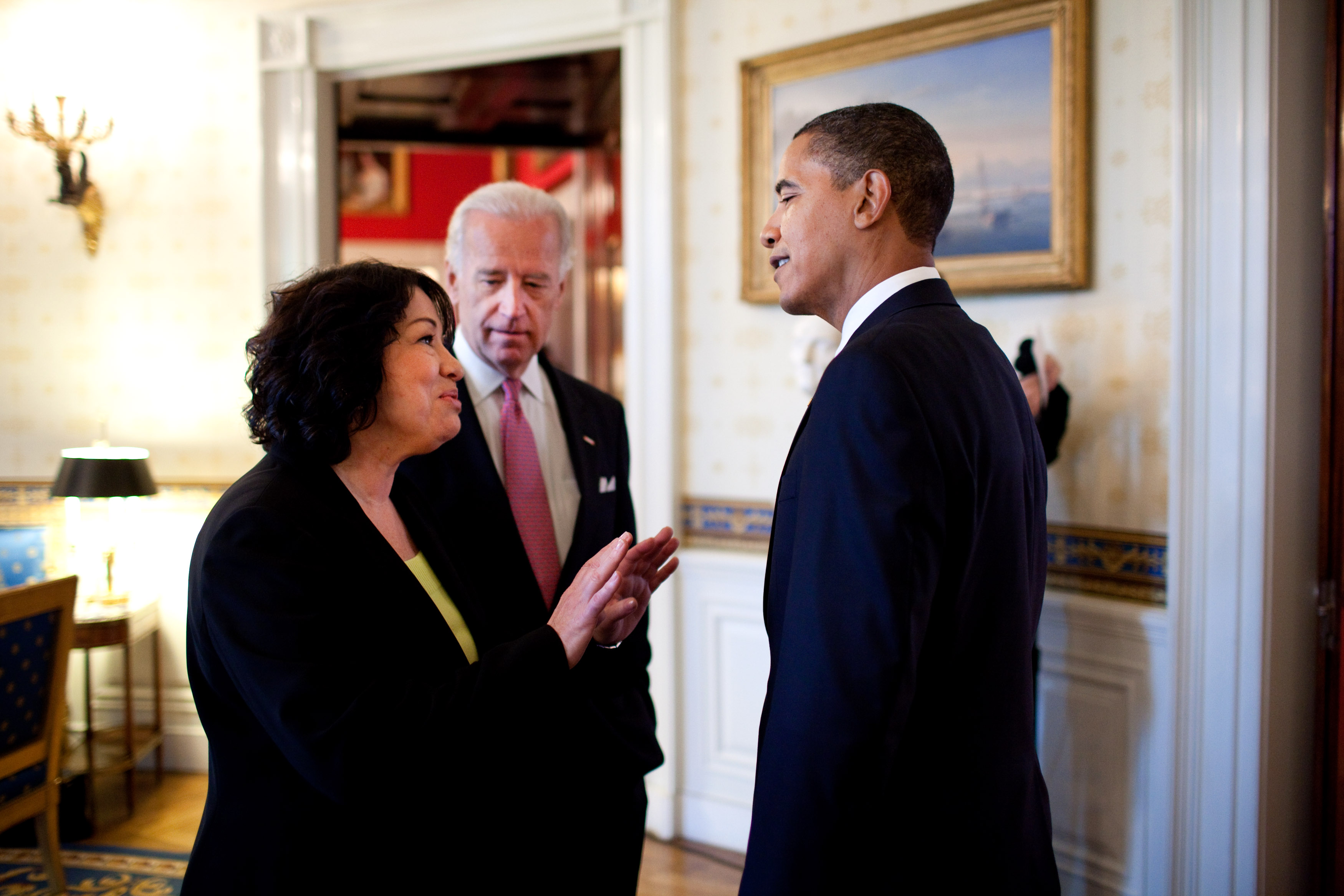
President Barack Obama meets with Judge Sonia Sotomayor and Vice President Joe Biden prior to an announcement in the East Room, May 26, 2009.

After Barack Obama won the 2008 presidential election, speculation arose that Sotomayor could be a leading candidate for a Supreme Court seat. New York Senators Chuck Schumer and Kirsten Gillibrand wrote Obama a letter urging him to appoint Sotomayor or Interior Secretary Ken Salazar to the Supreme Court if a vacancy arose during his term. The White House first contacted Sotomayor on April 27, 2009, about the possibility of her nomination.

On April 30, 2009, Justice David Souter's retirement plans leaked to the press, and Sotomayor received early attention as a possible nominee for Souter's seat, to be vacated in June 2009. But in May 2009, Harvard Law Professor Laurence Tribe urged Obama not to appoint Sotomayor, writing, "she's not nearly as smart as she seems to think she is" and "her reputation for being something of a bully could well make her liberal impulses backfire and simply add to the fire power of the Roberts/Alito/Scalia/Thomas wing of the court." While considering various possible nominees, Tribe strongly recommended Elena Kagan over Sotomayor.

On May 25, 2009, Obama informed Sotomayor of his choice; she later said, "I had my [hand] over my chest, trying to calm my beating heart, literally." On May 26, Obama nominated her. She became only the second jurist to be nominated to three different judicial positions by three different presidents. The selection appeared to closely match Obama's presidential campaign promise that he would nominate judges who had "the heart, the empathy, to recognize what it's like to be a teenage mom. The empathy to understand what it's like to be poor, or African-American, or gay, or disabled, or old."

Sotomayor's nomination was praised by Democrats and liberals, and Democrats appeared to have sufficient votes to confirm her. The strongest criticism of her nomination came from conservatives and some Republican senators regarding a line she had used in similar forms in a number of her speeches, particularly in a 2001 Berkeley Law lecture: "I would hope that a wise Latina woman with the richness of her experiences would more often than not reach a better conclusion than a white male who hasn't lived that life."

Sotomayor had made similar remarks in other speeches between 1994 and 2003, including one she submitted as part of her confirmation questionnaire for the Court of Appeals in 1998, but they attracted little attention at the time. The remark now became widely known. The rhetoric quickly became inflamed, with radio commentator Rush Limbaugh and former Republican Speaker of the House of Representatives Newt Gingrich calling Sotomayor a "racist" (although Gingrich later backtracked from that claim), while John Cornyn and other Republican senators denounced such attacks but called Sotomayor's approach troubling. Sotomayor's backers offered a variety of defenses of the remark, and White House Press Secretary Robert Gibbs said that Sotomayor's word choice in 2001 had been "poor". Sotomayor subsequently clarified her remark through Senate Judiciary Committee chair Patrick Leahy, saying that while life experience shapes who one is, "ultimately and completely" a judge follows the law regardless of personal background.

Of Sotomayor's cases, the Second Circuit rulings in Ricci v. DeStefano received the most attention during the early nomination discussion, motivated by the Republican desire to focus on the case's reverse racial discrimination aspect. In the midst of her confirmation process, the Supreme Court overturned that ruling on June 29. A third line of Republican attack against Sotomayor was based on her ruling in Maloney v. Cuomo and was motivated by gun ownership advocates concerned about her interpretation of Second Amendment rights. Some of the fervor with which conservatives and Republicans viewed Sotomayor's nomination was due to their grievances over the history of federal judicial nomination battles going back to the 1987 Robert Bork Supreme Court nomination.

A Gallup poll released a week after the nomination showed 54% of Americans in favor of Sotomayor's confirmation and 28% in opposition. A June 12 Fox News poll showed 58% of the public disagreeing with her "wise Latina" remark but 67% saying the remark should not disqualify her from serving on the Supreme Court. The American Bar Association gave her a unanimous "well qualified" assessment, its highest mark for professional qualification. After Ricci was overruled, Rasmussen Reports and CNN/Opinion Research polls showed that the public was sharply divided, largely along partisan and ideological lines, as to whether Sotomayor should be confirmed.

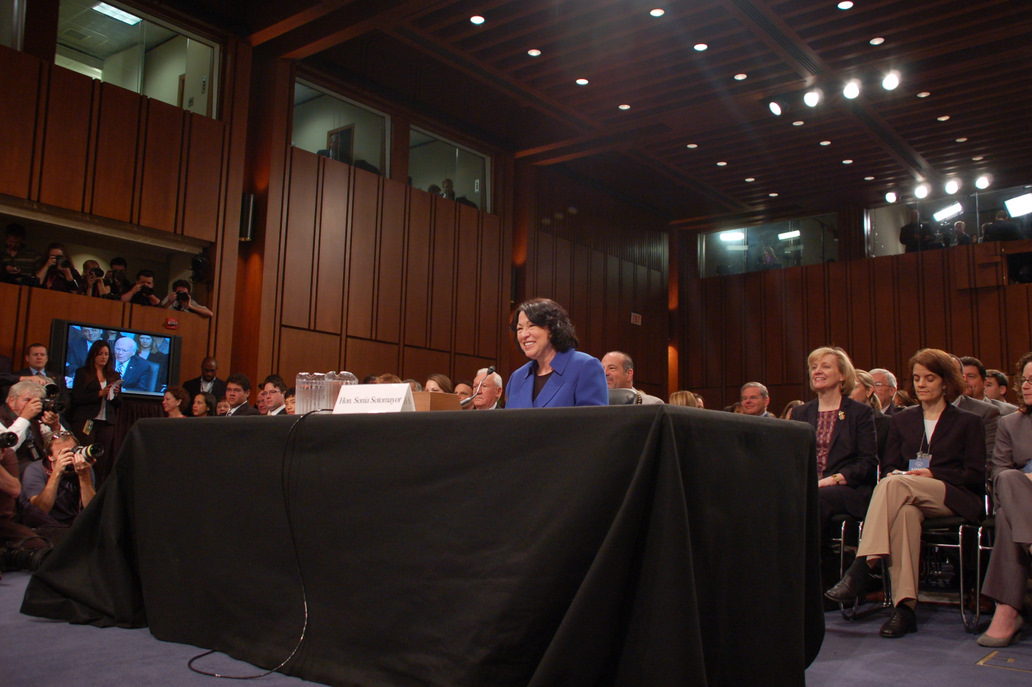
Sotomayor before the Senate Judiciary Committee for the first day of hearings on July 13, 2009

During Sotomayor's confirmation hearings before the Senate Judiciary Committee, which began on July 13, 2009, she backed away from her "wise Latina" remark, calling it "a rhetorical flourish that fell flat" and saying, "I do not believe that any ethnic, racial, or gender group has an advantage in sound judgment." When Republican senators confronted her about other lines from her speeches, she pointed to her judicial record and said she had never let her life experiences or opinions influence her decisions. Republican senators said that while her rulings to this point might be largely traditional, they feared her Supreme Court rulings—where there is more latitude with respect to precedent and interpretation—might be more reflective of her speeches.

Sotomayor defended her position in Ricci as following applicable precedent. When asked whom she admired, she pointed to Justice Benjamin N. Cardozo. In general, Sotomayor followed the hearings formula of recent nominees by avoiding stating personal positions, declining to take positions on controversial issues likely to come before the Court, agreeing with senators from both parties, and repeatedly affirming that as a justice she would just apply the law.

On July 28, the Senate Judiciary Committee voted 13–6 to confirm Sotomayor's nomination, sending it to the full Senate for a final vote. Every Democrat voted in her favor, as did one Republican, Lindsey Graham. On August 6, the full Senate confirmed Sotomayor by a vote of 68–31. All Democrats present, the Senate's two independents, and nine Republicans voted for her.

Obama commissioned Sotomayor on the day of her confirmation, and her swearing-in ceremony took place on August 8 at the Supreme Court Building. Chief Justice John Roberts administered the prescribed constitutional and judicial oaths of office, at which time she became the 111th justice (99th associate justice) of the Supreme Court. Sotomayor is the first Hispanic to serve on the Supreme Court, (Note: Some sources claim that this distinction belongs to Justice Benjamin Cardozo, a Sephardic Jew believed to be of distant Portuguese descent, who was appointed to the Court in 1932; however, his roots were uncertain, plus, the term "Hispanic" was not in use as an ethnic identifier at the time, and the Portuguese are generally excluded from its meaning.) and is one of six women who have served on the Court, along with Sandra Day O'Connor (from 1981 to 2006), Ruth Bader Ginsburg (1993 to 2020), Elena Kagan (since 2010), Amy Coney Barrett (since 2020), and Ketanji Brown Jackson (since 2022). Her appointment gave the Court a record six Roman Catholic justices serving at the same time. (Note: The five Catholics serving at the time Sotomayor joined the Court were: John Roberts, Antonin Scalia, Clarence Thomas, Samuel Alito and Anthony Kennedy.)

=== Justiceship ===
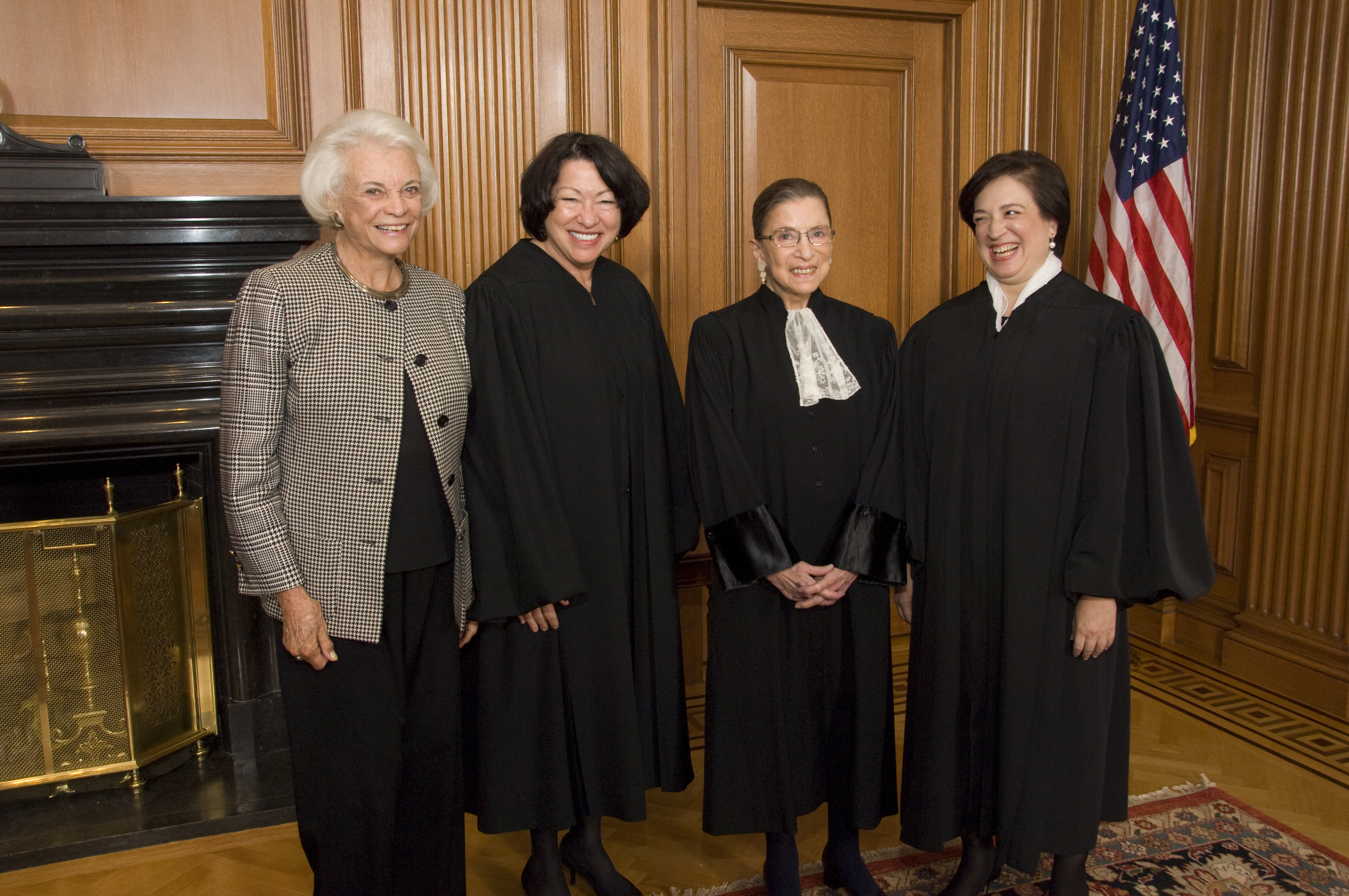
The first four women Supreme Court Justices: Sandra Day O'Connor, Sotomayor, Ruth Bader Ginsburg, and Elena Kagan. O'Connor is not wearing a robe because she is retired from the Court.

Sotomayor cast her first vote as an associate Supreme Court justice on August 17, 2009, in a stay of execution case. She was given a warm welcome onto the Court and was formally invested in a September 8 ceremony. The first case in which Sotomayor heard arguments was on September 9 during a special session, Citizens United v. Federal Election Commission. It involved the controversial aspect of the First Amendment and the rights of corporations in campaign finance; Sotomayor dissented. In her vigorous examination of Floyd Abrams, representing the First Amendment issues in the case, Sotomayor questioning the Court's 19th-century rulings and said, "What you are suggesting is that the courts, who created corporations as persons, gave birth to corporations as persons, and there could be an argument made that that was the Court's error to start with ... [imbuing] a creature of State law with human characteristics."

Sotomayor's first major written opinion was a dissent in the Berghuis v. Thompkins case dealing with Miranda rights. As her first year neared completion, Sotomayor said she felt swamped by the job's intensity and heavy workload. During the oral arguments for National Federation of Independent Business v. Sebelius, Sotomayor showed her increasing familiarity with the Court and its protocols by directing the opening questions of the arguments to Donald Verrilli, the Solicitor General representing the government's position.

In succeeding Souter, Sotomayor did not change the Court's net philosophical and ideological balance. Many cases are decided unanimously or with different voting coalitions, but Sotomayor has remained a reliable member of the Court's liberal bloc when the justices divide along the commonly perceived ideological lines. Specifically, her voting pattern and judicial philosophy has been in close agreement with that of Justices Breyer, Ginsburg, and Kagan. During her first few years there, Sotomayor voted with Ginsburg and Breyer 90 percent of the time, one of the highest agreement rates on the Court. In a 2015 article, "Ranking the Most Liberal Modern Supreme Court Justices", Alex Greer identified Sotomayor as representing a more liberal voting pattern than both Kagan and Ginsburg. Greer assigned Sotomayor the most liberal voting history of all the sitting justices, and a slightly less liberal record than her predecessors Thurgood Marshall and John Marshall Harlan II.

Chief Justice Roberts, together with Justices Kennedy, Thomas, and Alito (and former Justice Scalia) had comprised the Court's identifiable conservative wing. Although in 2009 five of the justices self-identified as having Roman Catholic affiliation, Sotomayor's voting history identifies her singly among them with the liberal bloc of the Court. There is a wide divergence among Catholics in general in their approaches to the law. Due to her upbringing and her past jobs and positions, Sotomayor has brought one of the more diverse sets of life experiences to the Court.

There have been some deviations from this ideological pattern. In a 2013 book on the Roberts Court, Marcia Coyle assessed Sotomayor's position on the Confrontation Clause of the Sixth Amendment as a strong guarantee of a defendant's right to confront their accusers. Sotomayor's judicial philosophy on the issue is seen as in parity with Kagan's and, unexpectedly for Sotomayor, also in at least partial agreement with Scalia's originalist reading when applied to the clause.

On January 20 and 21, 2013, Sotomayor administered the oath of office to Vice President Joe Biden for the inauguration of his second term. She became the first Hispanic and fourth woman to administer the oath to a president or vice president. On January 20, 2021, Sotomayor administered the oath of office to Kamala Harris for her inauguration as vice president, the first woman to ever hold the office.

By the end of her fifth year on the Court, Sotomayor had become especially visible in oral arguments and in passionate dissents from various majority rulings, especially those involving issues of race, gender, and ethnic identity. She had shown her individuality on the Court in a number of decisions. In her reading of the constitutionality of the Obama health care law favoring the poor and disabled, she sided with Ginsburg against fellow liberals Breyer and Kagan. Sotomayor responded to Roberts's statement that "the way to stop discrimination on the basis of race is to stop discriminating on the basis of race", writing, "I don't borrow Chief Justice Roberts's description of what color-blindness is... Our society is too complex to use that kind of analysis." In the manufacturer liability case Williamson v. Mazda, which the Court decided unanimously, she wrote a separate concurring opinion. Sotomayor's rapport with her clerks is seen as more formalistic than some of the other justices as she requires detailed and rigorous evaluations of cases she is considering with a table of contents attached. When compared to Kagan directly, one of their colleagues said, "Neither of them is a shrinking violet". In her 2013 book on the Roberts Court, Coyle wrote: "Both women are more vocal during arguments than the justices whom they succeeded, and they have energized the moderate-liberal side of the bench."

During her tenure on the Court, Sotomayor has also been recognized as among its strongest voices in supporting the rights of the accused. Laurence Tribe has identified her as the Court's foremost voice calling for reforming criminal justice adjudication—in particular as it relates misconduct by police and prosecutors, abuses in prisons, concerns about how the death penalty is used, and the potential for loss of privacy—and Tribe has compared her will to reform in general to that of past Chief Justice Earl Warren.

In January 2019, Bonnie Kristian of The Week wrote that an "unexpected civil libertarian alliance" was developing between Sotomayor and Neil Gorsuch "in defense of robust due process rights and skepticism of law enforcement overreach."

Members of Sotomayor's Court staff have suggested that public institutions such as colleges and libraries where she has held lectures, speeches, and other events buy her books to have available for purchase, which reportedly earned Sotomayor $3.7 million. Sotomayor's staff has also promoted her commercial events aimed at selling her memoir and children's books. Use of government staff is prohibited for such activities in other government branches.

=== Notable rulings ===
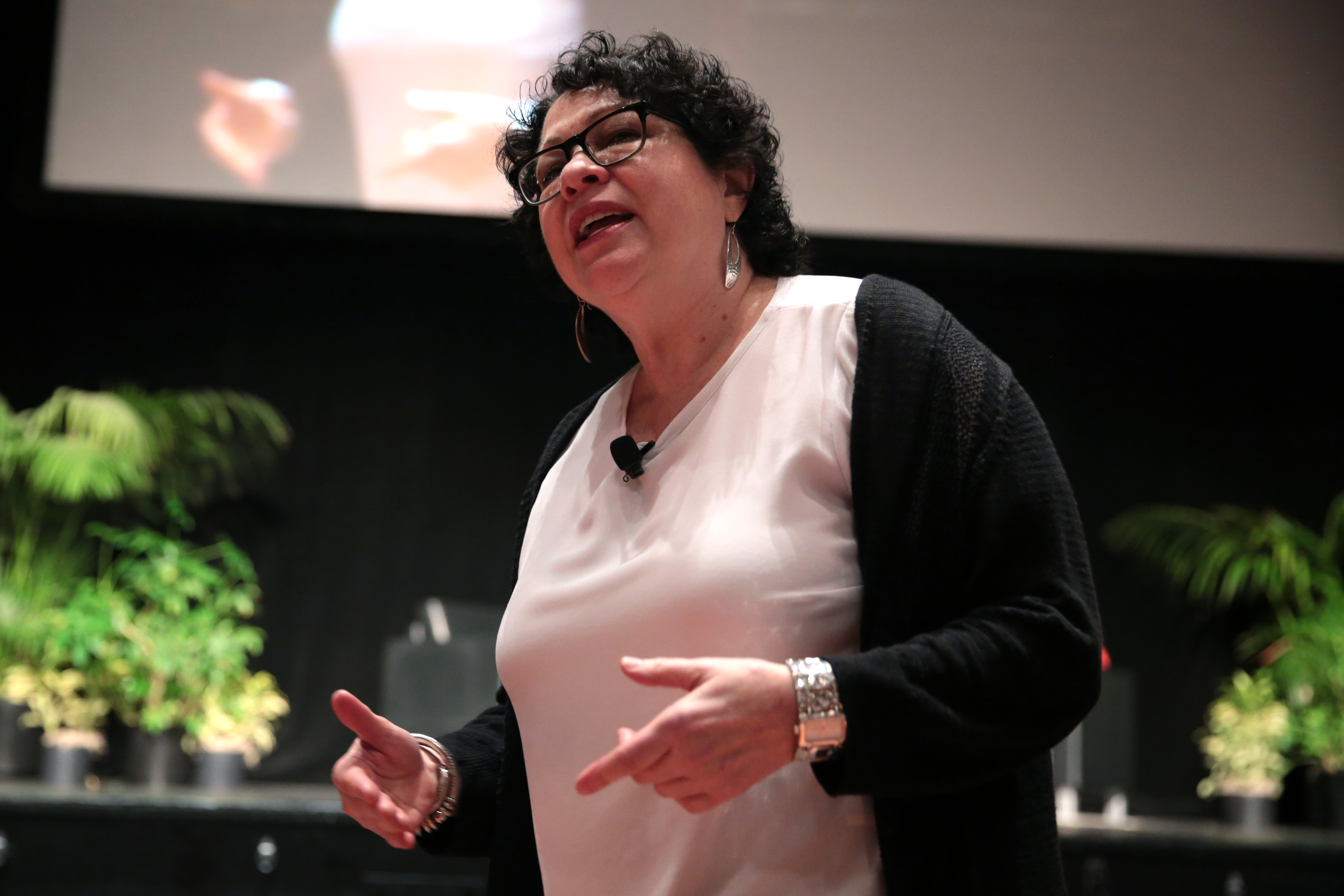
Sotomayor in 2017

==== Miranda warnings ====
In 2011, Sotomayor wrote the majority opinion in J.D.B. v. North Carolina, in which the Supreme Court held that age is relevant when determining when a person is in police custody for Miranda purposes. J.D.B. was a 13-year-old student enrolled in special education classes whom police suspected of committing two robberies. A police investigator visited J.D.B. at school, where he was interrogated by the investigator, a uniformed police officer, and school officials. J.D.B. subsequently confessed to his crimes and was convicted. He was not given a Miranda warning during the interrogation, nor an opportunity to contact his legal guardian. In determining that a child's age properly informs the Miranda custody analysis, Sotomayor wrote, "to hold... that a child's age is never relevant to whether a suspect has been taken into custody—and thus to ignore the very real differences between children and adults—would be to deny children the full scope of the procedural safeguards that Miranda guarantees to adults". Her opinion cited Stansbury v. California (holding that a child's age "would have affected how a reasonable person" would "perceive his or her freedom to leave") and Yarborough v. Alvarado (holding that a child's age "generates commonsense conclusions about behavior and perception"). Sotomayor also pointed out that the law recognizes that a child's judgment is not the same as an adult's, in the form of legal disqualifications on children as a class (e.g., limitations on a child's ability to marry without parental consent). Justice Alito wrote a dissenting opinion that three other justices joined.

==== Stolen Valor Act ====
In United States v. Alvarez (2012), the Court struck down the Stolen Valor Act (a federal law that criminalized false statements about having received a military medal) on First Amendment grounds. While a 6–3 majority of the Court agreed that the law was an unconstitutional violation of the Free Speech Clause, it did not agree on a rationale. Sotomayor was among four justices, along with Roberts, Ginsburg and Kennedy, who concluded that a statement's falsity is not enough, by itself, to exclude speech from First Amendment protection. Justices Breyer and Kagan concluded that while false statements are entitled to some protection, the act was invalid because it could have achieved its objectives in less restrictive ways. Justices Scalia, Thomas, and Alito dissented.

==== Affordable Care Act ====
In National Federation of Independent Business v. Sebelius (2012), Sotomayor was part of a 5–4 majority that upheld most of the provisions of the Patient Protection and Affordable Care Act (while being part of a dissent against the reliance upon the Constitution's Taxing and Spending Clause rather than Commerce Clause in arriving at the support). Legal writer Jeffrey Toobin wrote, "Sotomayor's concerns tended toward the earthbound and practical. Sometimes, during oral arguments, she would go on tangents involving detailed questions about the facts of cases that would leave her colleagues stupefied, sinking into their chairs. This time, though, she had a simple line of inquiry. States require individuals to buy automobile insurance (implicitly suggesting the unavoidable comparison to health insurance and the fairness of applying the same principle to health insurance as well)." Sotomayor concluded with a rhetorical flourish directed at the attorneys: "Do you think that if some states decided not to impose an insurance requirement that the federal government would be without power to legislate and require every individual to buy car insurance?" For Toobin, this distinction Sotomayor drew was the heart of the majority's argument.

In 2014, Sotomayor dissented from a 6–3 ruling that granted Wheaton College of Illinois, a religiously affiliated university, an exemption from complying with the Affordable Care Act (ACA)'s mandate on contraception. The ruling, which came in the immediate wake of the Court's 5–4 decision in Burwell v. Hobby Lobby, in which the conservative bloc had prevailed, was opposed by the court's three female members: Sotomayor, Ginsburg, and Kagan. In her dissent, Sotomayor wrote that the case was at odds with the majority's statements in Hobby Lobby: "Those who are bound by our decisions usually believe they can take us at our word ... Not today." Sotomayor added that the decision risked depriving "hundreds of Wheaton's employees and students of their legal entitlement to contraceptive coverage."

==== Immigration ====
Sotomayor was part of a 5–3 majority in Arizona v. United States (2012), holding that federal immigration statutes preempted several aspects of the Arizona SB 1070 anti-illegal immigration law.

==== Fourth Amendment, privacy rights, & qualified immunity ====
Sotomayor has taken positions in favor of an expansive view of the Fourth Amendment protections relating to privacy rights and search and seizure. In United States v. Jones (2012), all nine justices agreed that a warrant was likely to be required before police could place a GPS tracking device on a suspect's car. Most justices sided with a narrow opinion by Justice Alito, but Sotomayor (in a lone concurrence) advocated a more expansive view of privacy rights in a digital age, calling for a reassessment of the longstanding third-party doctrine: "It may be necessary to reconsider the premise that an individual has no reasonable expectation of privacy in information voluntarily disclosed to third parties." The next year, federal judge Richard J. Leon cited this concurrence in his ruling that the National Security Agency's bulk collection of Americans' telephony records likely violated the Fourth Amendment. Law professors Adam Winkler and Laurence Tribe were among those who said that Sotomayor's Jones concurrence had been influential in calling out the need for a new basis for privacy requirements in a world, as she wrote, "in which people reveal a great deal of information about themselves to third parties in the course of carrying out mundane tasks."

In Missouri v. McNeely (2013), Sotomayor wrote the majority opinion holding that a warrant is required before police take a nonconsensual blood test of a motorist suspected of drunk driving. In Navarette v. California (2014), she joined Justice Scalia's dissent from an opinion finding no Fourth Amendment violation from a traffic stop and drug seizure based solely on an anonymous tip submitted to 911. Sotomayor was the lone dissenter in Mullenix v. Luna (2015), a case in which the Court held, per curiam, that an officer who fired six shots at a fleeing fugitive in a high-speed car chase was entitled to qualified immunity; Sotomayor wrote, "By sanctioning a 'shoot first, think later' approach to policing, the Court renders the protections of the Fourth Amendment hollow."

In Utah v. Strieff, a case involving the exclusionary rule, Sotomayor dissented from the Court's ruling that evidence obtained as a result of an illegal police stop could be admitted if the stopped person was later found to have an outstanding traffic warrant, writing that it was a "remarkable proposition" that the existence of a warrant could justify a stop illegally based on police officers' "whim or hunch". Echoing her earlier dissent in Heien v. North Carolina (2014), and citing the works of figures such as W. E. B. Du Bois, James Baldwin, and Ta-Nehisi Coates, she wrote that Strieff and other Supreme Court Fourth Amendment jurisprudence sent the message "that you are not the citizen of a democracy but the subject of a carceral state, just waiting to be catalogued."

==== Abortion ====
In Whole Woman's Health v. Jackson (2021), a case regarding a Texas abortion law that allows private citizens to sue abortion providers, Sotomayor wrote a sharp dissenting opinion, joined by Justices Breyer and Kagan. By a 5–4 vote, the Supreme Court upheld the Texas law. Sotomayor concluded: "While the Court properly holds that this suit may proceed against the licensing officials, it errs gravely in foreclosing relief against state-court officials and the state attorney general. By so doing, the Court leaves all manner of constitutional rights more vulnerable than ever before, to the great detriment of our Constitution and our Republic."

In her dissenting opinion in Department of State v. Muñoz (2024), Sotomayor called Dobbs v. Jackson Women's Health Organization (2022) the "eradication of the right to abortion".

== Other activities ==
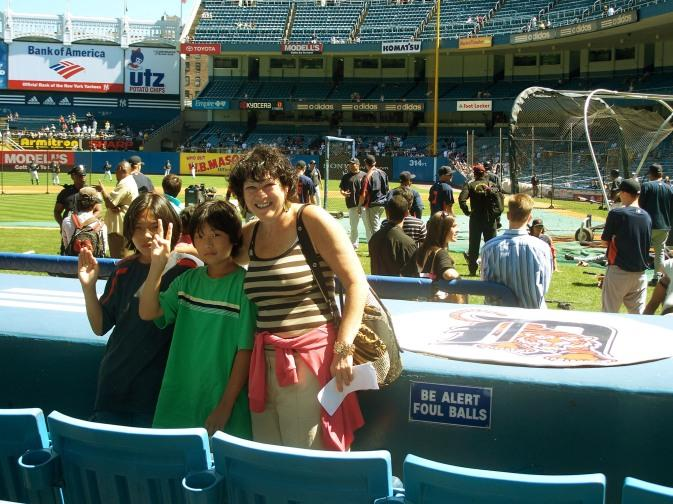
Sotomayor with her nephews at the original Yankee Stadium in 2007

From 1998 to 2007, Sotomayor was an adjunct professor at New York University School of Law, where she taught trial and appellate advocacy and a federal appellate court seminar. Beginning in 1999, she was also a lecturer in law at Columbia Law School in a paying, adjunct faculty position. While there she created and co-taught a class called the Federal Appellate Externship each semester from 2000 until her departure; it combined classroom, moot court, and Second Circuit chambers work. She became a member of Princeton University's Board of Trustees in 2006, concluding her term in 2011. In 2008, Sotomayor became a member of the Belizean Grove, an invitation-only women's group modeled after the men's Bohemian Grove. On June 19, 2009, Sotomayor resigned from the Belizean Grove after Republican politicians voiced concerns over the group's membership policy.

Sotomayor has maintained a public presence, mostly through making speeches, since joining the federal judiciary and throughout her time on the Supreme Court. She gave over 180 speeches between 1993 and 2009, about half of which either focused on issues of ethnicity or gender or were delivered to minority or women's groups. While on the Supreme Court she has been invited to give commencement addresses at a number of universities, including New York University (2012), Yale University (2013), and the University of Puerto Rico (2014). Her speeches have tended to give a clearer picture of her worldview than her rulings. They have often focused on ethnic identity and experience, the need for diversity, and America's struggle with the implications of its diverse makeup. She has also presented her career achievements as an example of the success of affirmative action policies in university admissions, saying "I am the perfect affirmative action baby" in regard to her belief that her admission test scores were not comparable to those of her classmates. In 2012, Sotomayor made two appearances as herself on the children's television program Sesame Street, explaining what a vocational career is in general and then demonstrating how a judge hears a case.

In 2010, Sotomayor signed a contract with Alfred A. Knopf to publish a memoir about the early part of her life. She received an advance of nearly $1.2 million for the book, which was published in 2013 and titled My Beloved World (Mi mundo adorado in the simultaneously published Spanish edition). It focuses on her life up to 1992, with recollections of growing up in housing projects in New York and descriptions of the challenges she faced. It received good reviews, with Michiko Kakutani of The New York Times calling it "a compelling and powerfully written memoir about identity and coming of age. ... It's an eloquent and affecting testament to the triumph of brains and hard work over circumstance, of a childhood dream realized through extraordinary will and dedication." Sotomayor staged a book tour to promote it, and it debuted atop the New York Times Best Seller List.

In 2020, Sotomayor was reportedly targeted by the same gunman, an angry lawyer, who entered U.S. District Court Judge Esther Salas's home, shooting her husband and killing her son. The gunman subsequently killed himself, after which his detailed planning notes regarding Sotomayor were found.

In January 2021, Sotomayor swore in Kamala Harris as Vice President of the United States. It was considered historic as Sotomayor is the first Latina on the Supreme Court and Harris was the first woman, African-American, and Asian-American vice president.

== Personal life ==
On August 14, 1976, just after graduating from Princeton, Sotomayor married Kevin Edward Noonan, whom she had dated since high school, in a small chapel at St. Patrick's Cathedral in New York. She used the married name Sonia Sotomayor de Noonan. They divorced in 1983, and Noonan became a biologist and patent lawyer.

== Awards and honors ==
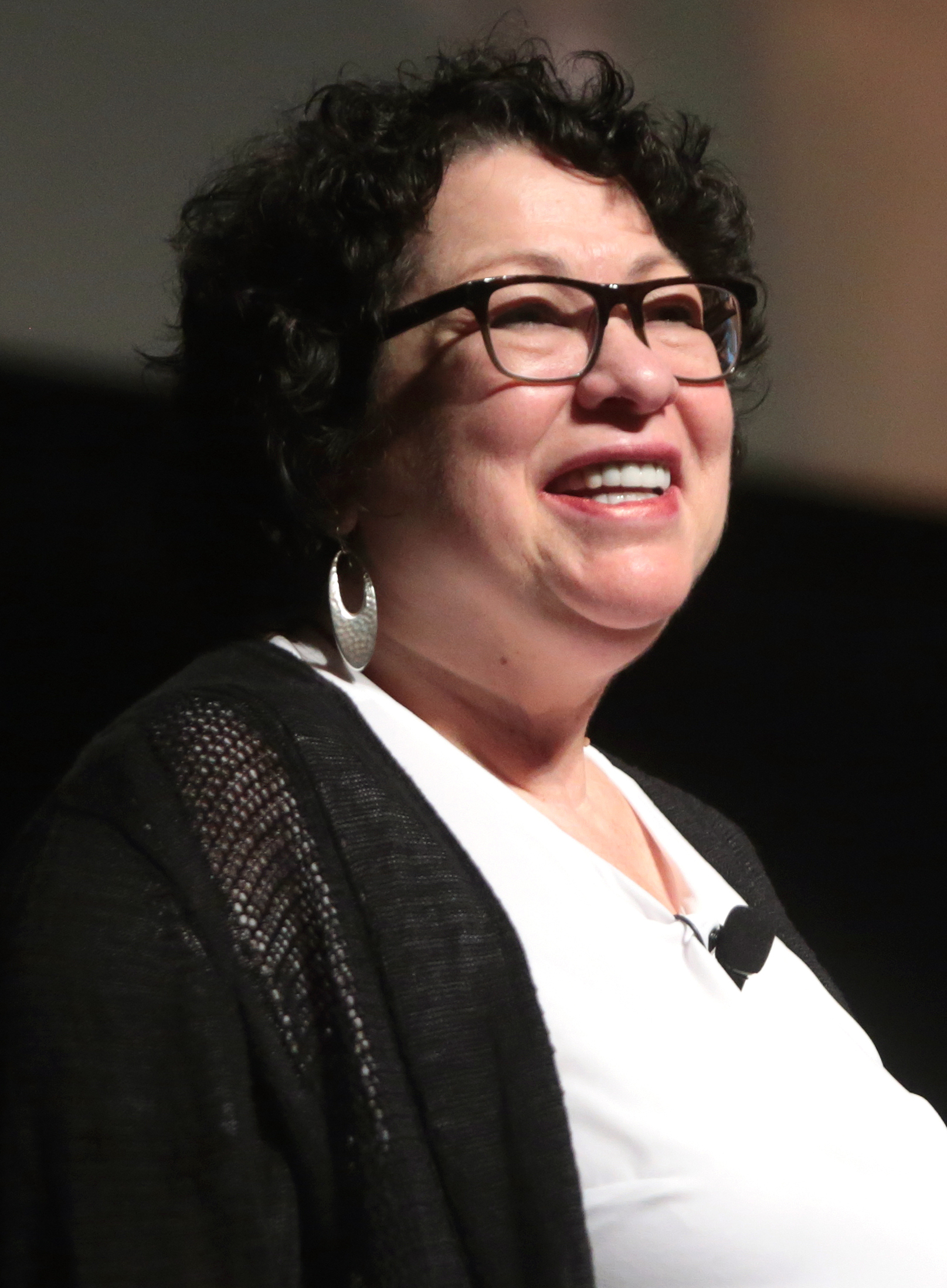
Sotomayor at the 2017 John P. Frank Memorial Lecture at Arizona State University as the guest of honor

Sotomayor has received honorary law degrees from Lehman College (1999), Princeton University (2001), Brooklyn Law School (2001), Pace University School of Law (2003), Hofstra University (2006), Northeastern University School of Law (2007), Howard University (2010), St. Lawrence University (2010), Paris Nanterre University (2010), New York University (2012), Yale University (2013), the University of Puerto Rico at Río Piedras (2014), and an honorary doctorate of human letters from Manhattan University (2019).

She was elected a member of the American Philosophical Society in 2002. She was given the Outstanding Latino Professional Award in 2006 by the Latino/a Law Students Association. In 2008, Esquire magazine included Sotomayor on its list of "The 75 Most Influential People of the 21st Century". In 2013, Sotomayor won the Woodrow Wilson Award at Princeton University.

In June 2010, the Bronxdale Houses development, where Sotomayor grew up, was renamed after her. The Justice Sonia Sotomayor Houses and Justice Sonia Sotomayor Community Center comprise 28 buildings with some 3,500 residents. Many New York housing developments are named after well-known people, but this was only the second to be named after a former resident. In 2011, the Sonia M. Sotomayor Learning Academies, a public high school complex in Los Angeles, was named after her.

In 2013, a painting featuring her, Sandra Day O'Connor, Ruth Bader Ginsburg, and Elena Kagan was unveiled at the Smithsonian's National Portrait Gallery in Washington, D.C. In May 2015, she received the Katharine Hepburn medal from Bryn Mawr College. In 2019, she was inducted into the National Women's Hall of Fame and 2024 she received the Radcliffe Medal from the Harvard Radcliffe Institute, awarded annually to "an individual who has had a transformative impact on society."

== Publications ==
=== Books ===
- Sotomayor, Sonia (2022) Just Help! How to Build a Better World. New York: Penguin Random House. ISBN 9780593206263.
- Sotomayor, Sonia (2019). Just Ask! Be Different, Be Brave, Be You. New York: Penguin Random House. ISBN 9780525514121.
- Sotomayor, Sonia (2019). The Beloved World of Sonia Sotomayor. New York: Penguin Random House. ISBN 9781524771171.
- Sotomayor, Sonia (2018). Turning Pages: My Life Story. New York: Philomel Books. ISBN 9780525514084.
- Sotomayor, Sonia (2013). My Beloved World. New York: Alfred A. Knopf. ISBN 9780307594884.

=== Articles ===
- Sotomayor, Sonia (2017). "A Tribute to Justice Scalia" (PDF). Yale Law Journal. 126: 1609–1611.
- Sotomayor, Sonia (1999). "La Independencia Judicial: Que Necesitamos Para Conservarla". Revista Colegio de Abogados de Puerto Rico. 60: 59.
- Sotomayor, Sonia; Gordon, Nicole A. (1996). "Returning Majesty to the Law and Politics: A Modern Approach" (PDF). Suffolk University Law Review. 30: 35–51. Archived from the original (PDF) on June 19, 2009.
- Sotomayor, Sonia (1979). "Statehood and the Equal Footing Doctrine: The Case for Puerto Rican Seabed Rights" (PDF). Yale Law Journal. 88 (4): 825–849. doi:10.2307/795781. JSTOR 795781.

=== Forewords ===
- Sotomayor, Sonia (2007). "Foreword". In Terris, Daniel; Romano, Cesare P. R.; Swigart, Leigh (eds.). The International Judge: An Introduction to the Men and Women who Decide the World's Cases. Lebanon: University Press of New England. ISBN 9781584656661.

=== Speeches ===
- Sotomayor, Sonia (2014). "A Conversation with Justice Sotomayor" (PDF). Yale Law Journal Forum. 123: 375–391.
- Sotomayor, Sonia (2004). "A Latina Judge's Voice (Judge Mario G. Olmos Memorial Lecture)" (PDF). Berkeley la Raza Law Journal. 13: 87–93.
- Sotomayor, Sonia (2004). "Tribute to John Sexton" (PDF). NYU Annual Survey of American Law. 60: 23–26.

== See also ==
- Barack Obama Supreme Court candidates
- Bill Clinton judicial appointment controversies
- Demographics of the Supreme Court of the United States
- George W. Bush judicial appointment controversies
- History of women in Puerto Rico
- List of Hispanic and Latino American jurists
- List of justices of the Supreme Court of the United States
- List of law clerks for the third seat of the Supreme Court of the United States
- List of Puerto Ricans
- List of Roman Catholic United States Supreme Court justices
- List of United States Supreme Court justices by time in office
- Nuyorican
- Puerto Ricans in the United States

== Bibliography ==
- Coyle, Marcia (2013). The Roberts Court: The Struggle for the Constitution. New York: Simon & Schuster. ISBN 978-1-4516-2751-0.
- Tushnet, Mark (2013). In the Balance: Law and Politics on the Roberts Court. New York: W. W. Norton & Company. ISBN 978-0-393-07344-7.
- Toobin, Jeffrey (2012). The Oath: The Obama White House and The Supreme Court. New York: Doubleday Press. ISBN 978-0-385-52720-0.
- Tribe, Laurence; Matz, Joshua (2014). Uncertain Justice: The Roberts Court and the Constitution. New York: Henry Holt and Company. ISBN 978-0-8050-9909-6.

Legal offices
Preceded by John M. Walker Jr.	Judge of the United States District Court for the Southern District of New York; 1992–1998	Succeeded by Victor Marrero
Preceded by J. Daniel Mahoney	Judge of the United States Court of Appeals for the Second Circuit; 1998–2009	Succeeded by Raymond Lohier
Preceded by David Souter	Associate Justice of the Supreme Court of the United States; 2009–present	Incumbent
U.S. order of precedence (ceremonial)
Preceded by Samuel Alito	Order of precedence of the United States as Associate Justice of the Supreme Court	Succeeded by Elena Kagan
