= Stephen Shapiro =

Stephen, Steven, or Steve Shapiro could refer to:

- Stephen A. Shapiro, American psychotherapist
- Steven A. Shapiro, American army general officer
- Steven R. Shapiro (born 1951), American attorney and former National Legal Director of the American Civil Liberties Union

== See also ==
- Steve Schapiro (born 1934), American photographer
