= J. D. B. v. North Carolina =

- Supreme Court of the United States

Argued March 23, 2011 Decided June 16, 2011
- Full case name: J. D. B. v. North Carolina
- Docket no.: 09-11121
- Citations: 564 U.S. 261 (more) 131 S. Ct. 2394; 180 L. Ed. 2d 310
- Argument: Oral argument

Case history
- Prior: Conviction affirmed sub nom. In re J. D. B., 196 N.C.App. 234, 674 S.E.2d 795 (2009); affirmed, 363 N.C. 664, 686 S.E.2d 135 (2009); cert. granted, 562 U.S. 1001 (2010).

Holding
- A child’s age properly informs the Miranda custody analysis.

Court membership
- Chief Justice John Roberts Associate Justices Antonin Scalia · Anthony Kennedy; Clarence Thomas · Ruth Bader Ginsburg; Stephen Breyer · Samuel Alito; Sonia Sotomayor · Elena Kagan

Case opinions
- Majority: Sotomayor, joined by Kennedy, Ginsburg, Breyer, Kagan
- Dissent: Alito, joined by Roberts, Scalia, Thomas

J. D. B. v. North Carolina, 564 U.S. 261 (2011), was a case in which the Supreme Court of the United States held that age and mental status are relevant when determining police custody for Miranda purposes, overturning its prior ruling from seven years before. J. D. B. was a 13-year-old student enrolled in special education classes whom police had suspected of committing two robberies. A police investigator visited J. D. B. at school, where he was interrogated by the investigator, a uniformed police officer, and school officials. J. D. B. subsequently confessed to his crimes and was convicted. J. D. B. was not given a Miranda warning during the interrogation, nor an opportunity to contact his legal guardian.

During the trial, attempts to suppress the statements given by J. D. B. because he was not given a Miranda warning were denied on the grounds that J. D. B. was not in police custody. J. D. B. appealed.

The North Carolina Supreme Court held that the Supreme Court's ruling in Yarborough v. Alvarado barred them from determining whether or not he was in custody based on his age. The court determined that a reasonable adult would've felt free to leave; consequently, J. D. B. was not in custody. Thus the court affirmed the ruling of the trial court. J. D. B. appealed, and the U.S. Supreme Court granted certiorari.

The U.S. Supreme Court argued that the age and mental status of an individual can take part in the psychological effect that he faces during police interaction. The reasoning was similar to that of the 1970 Kentucky Supreme Court case of Allee v. Commonwealth, which held that the age and mental status of an individual is relevant in determining whether his statements are involuntary. Based on these reasons, the U.S. Supreme Court reversed the North Carolina Supreme Court and remanded for further proceedings. The North Carolina Supreme Court on remand then determined that J. D. B. was in custody, and remanded for further proceedings.

== Background ==
=== Miranda warnings ===
A Miranda warning is an explanation of a suspect's rights that must be given by law enforcement before interrogation. It stems from the 1966 Miranda v. Arizona case, and is based primarily on the Fifth Amendment right against self-incrimination. If a defendant in custody is not notified of their rights via a Miranda warning, any confession they give may not be admissible in court. If a defendant is not in police custody, however, police are free to question suspects without informing them of their rights, and their statements may still be admissible.

=== Police investigation ===
J. D. B. was a 13-year-old student attending Smith Middle School in Chapel Hill, North Carolina when he was taken out of class by a uniformed police officer and questioned. J. D. B. had been questioned previously by the police when they saw him in the neighborhood where two home break-ins had occurred. After questioning J. D. B. the first time, police learned that a digital camera matching the description of a stolen item had been seen in the possession of J. D. B. This prompted the juvenile investigator assigned to the case to go to the school to question J. D. B. Upon arriving at the school, the investigator informed the uniformed police officer on detail at the school and members of the school's administration. The uniformed officer interrupted the class J. D. B. was in and escorted him to a school conference room, where J. D. B. was subsequently questioned by the investigator, police officer, and members of the school's administration for 30 to 45 minutes. Prior to the questioning, J. D. B. was neither given Miranda warnings nor an opportunity to speak to his legal guardian, nor was he informed that he was free to leave the room.

Initially J. D. B. denied any wrongdoing. After being confronted with the stolen camera and after the urging of a school administrator, J. D. B. confessed to the break-ins. It was at this point, after the confession, that the investigator informed J. D. B. that he could refuse to answer questions and that he was free to leave. J. D. B. indicated that he understood and then proceeded to provide further details about the crime, including the location of the stolen property. J. D. B. wrote a statement at the investigator's request. He was allowed to leave to catch the bus home.

=== Trial and appeal ===
Two juvenile petitions were filed against J. D. B. Each alleged one count of larceny and one count of breaking and entering. J. D. B.'s public defender moved to suppress J. D. B.'s statements and the evidence derived from them, arguing that J. D. B. had been interrogated in police custody without the required Miranda warnings. The trial court decided that J. D. B. was not in custody, and denied the motion. The North Carolina Supreme Court affirmed with a divided panel, "declin[ing] to extend the test for custody to include consideration of the age... of an individual subjected to questioning by police".

The Supreme Court granted certiorari to determine whether the Miranda custody analysis includes consideration of a juvenile suspect’s age. The American Civil Liberties Union, American Bar Association, and the National Association of Criminal Defense Lawyers were among the organizations that filed amicus briefs in support of J. D. B. The attorneys general of 30 states and 2 unincorporated territories filed an amicus brief in support of North Carolina.

== Opinion of the court ==
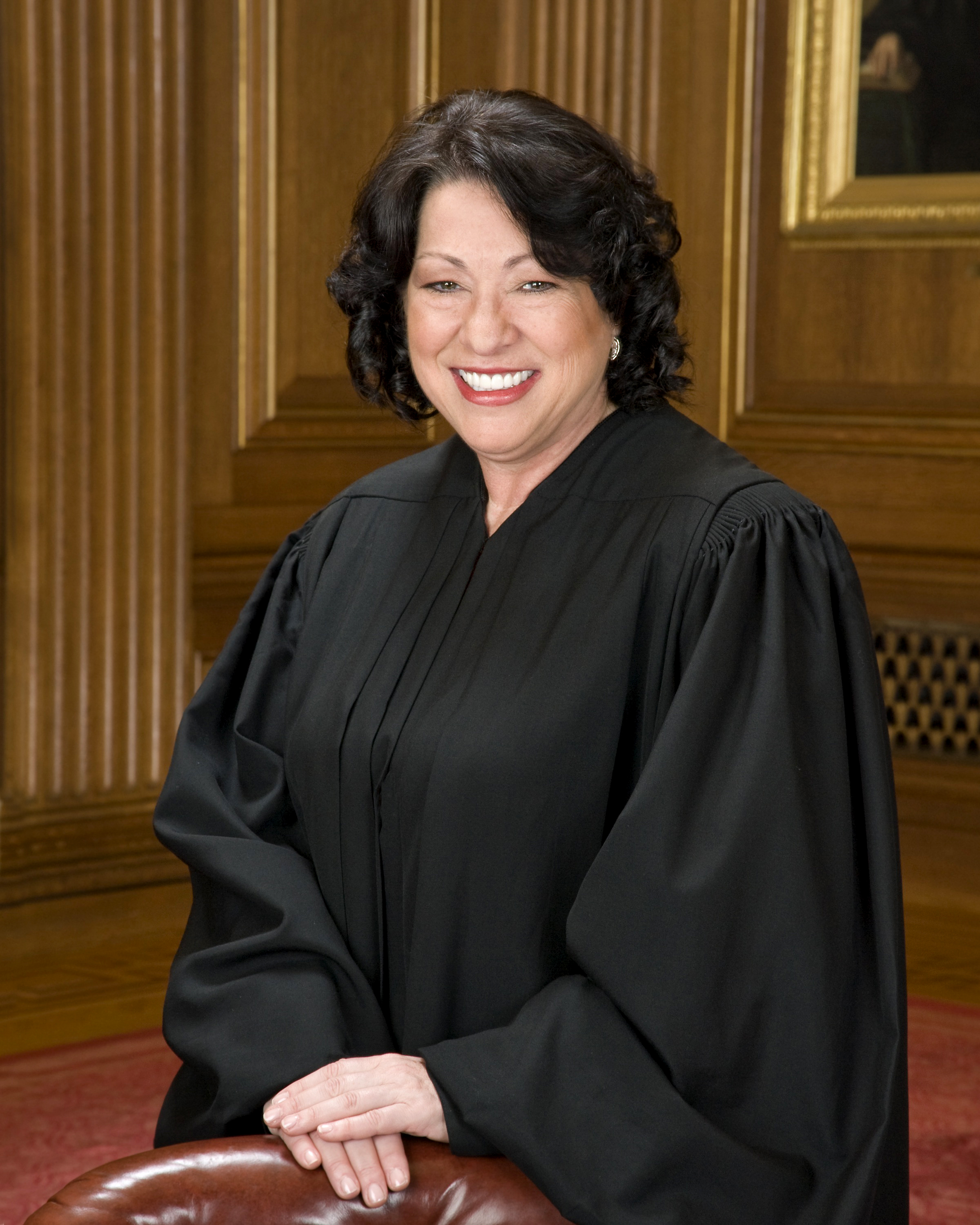
Justice Sotomayor authored the Court's opinion.

Associate Justice Sonia Sotomayor wrote the opinion for the Court. The Court held that a child's age properly informs the Miranda custody analysis.

=== Relevancy of age ===
The Court underscored the dangers of not applying age to the custody analysis, writing:

to hold... that a child's age is never relevant to whether a suspect has been taken into custody— and thus to ignore the very real differences between children and adults— would be to deny children the full scope of the procedural safeguards that Miranda guarantees to adults.

The opinion cited Stansbury v. California, where the Court held that a child's age "would have affected how a reasonable person" in the suspect's position "would perceive his or her freedom to leave". Yarborough v. Alvarado was also cited, where the Court wrote that a child's age "generates commonsense conclusions about behavior and perception". Finally, the Court pointed out that the law reflects the idea that a child's judgment is not the same as an adult's, in the form of legal disqualifications on children as a class (e.g. limitations on a child's ability to marry without parental consent).

=== Miranda as an objective test ===
The Court placed emphasis on the fact that age is an objective circumstance and including it in a custody analysis does not place an undue burden on the police. The Court has repeatedly emphasized that the custody analysis is an objective test. In Thompson v. Keohane the Court wrote that:

Two discrete inquiries are essential to the determination: first, what were the circumstances surrounding the interrogation; and second, given those circumstances, would a reasonable person have felt he or she was at liberty to terminate the interrogation and leave. Once the scene is set and the players’ lines and actions are reconstructed, the court must apply an objective test to resolve the ultimate inquiry: was there a formal arrest or restraint on freedom of movement of the degree associated with formal arrest.

— Associate Justice Ruth Bader Ginsburg, Thompson v. Keohane

The Court wrote that consideration of age involved no consideration of the specific mindset of the individual. Rather, the Court held that age is an objective factor that affects how a reasonable person would perceive his or her freedom to leave.

=== Dissent ===
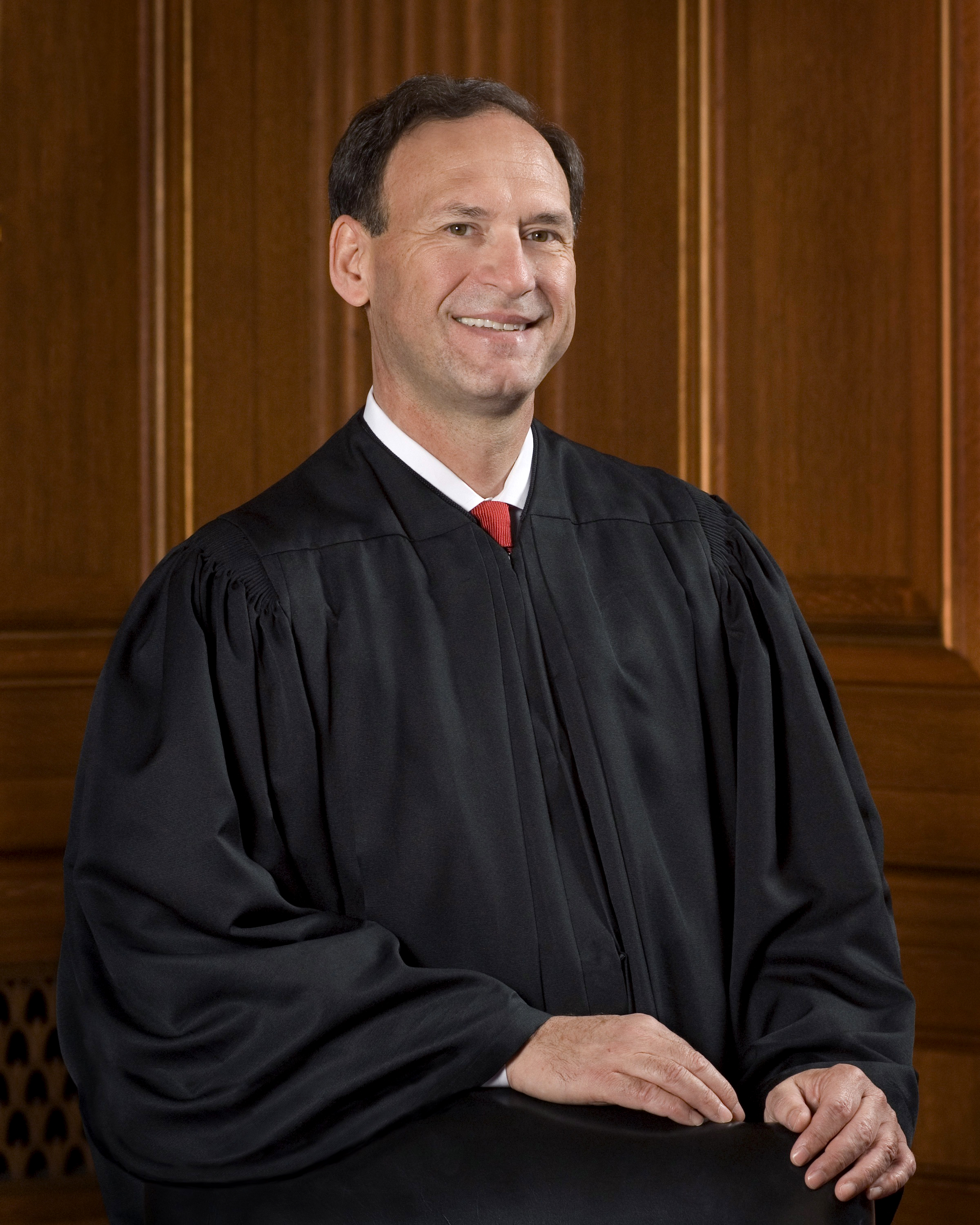
Justice Alito authored the opinion for the dissent.

Associate Justice Samuel Alito wrote a dissenting opinion for four Justices. The primary objection of the dissent was that the ruling of the majority was inconsistent with one of the main justifications for the Miranda rule: the need for a clear rule that is easily applied in all cases. Alito argued the decision shifted custody determination from a simple test to an inquiry that must account for individualized characteristics. Alito emphasized that age is not the only characteristic that may affect a subject under interrogation and that in future cases the court will be tasked with adding additional characteristics to custody determination or by "arbitrarily distinguishing a suspect's age from other personal characteristics".

== Reception and subsequent developments ==
The case attracted differing opinions from the legal community. Steven Drizin, professor at Northwestern University School of Law, characterized the ruling as "huge", noting that police would no longer be able to choose to question young suspects at a school in order to avoid giving a Miranda warning, a practice he characterized as a "loophole". The Juvenile Law Center praised the ruling as "a resounding statement" in line with "settled research and basic common sense". Steven Shapiro, legal director of the ACLU concurred, stating that "we have to ensure that students' rights are protected... and the decision is a step in that direction."

Other analysts were troubled that the decision would leave "a murky landscape for law enforcement". John Charles Thomas, representing the National District Attorneys Association, concluded: "The pressure is basically to err on the side of caution, to give the Miranda warning almost every time." Professor Stephen Saltzburg of George Washington University agreed that the ruling would pressure police to adopt a strategy of "When in doubt, give Miranda warnings", but also opined that it would make little practical difference to young people facing police questioning. "The reality is that even with Miranda warnings, it's doubtful that young people understand exactly what it all means and understand their choices, and so in the long run, I doubt that there will be many fewer confessions because of this opinion."
