= Church of the Blessed Sacrament =

Church of the Blessed Sacrament or variations may refer to:

- Cathedral of the Most Blessed Sacrament, Detroit, Michigan
- Blessed Sacrament Catholic Church, Hollywood, Hollywood, Los Angeles, California
- Blessed Sacrament Church (Bronx, New York)
- Church of the Blessed Sacrament (Manhattan), New York
- Church of the Blessed Sacrament (Staten Island, New York)
- Church of the Blessed Sacrament (Singapore)
