= Just Ask! Be Different, Be Brave, Be You =

2019 book

Just Ask! Be Different, Be Brave, Be You is a children’s picture book written by Sonia Sotomayor and illustrated by Rafael Lopez. The book was published on September 3, 2019, and won ALA’s 2020 Schneider Family Book Award. The book follows the experiences of children who are diagnosed with disabilities and focuses on the power of these differences.

== Background ==
Sonia Sotomayor was inspired to write Just Ask! Be Different, Be Brave, Be You based on her experience in the bathroom of a restaurant. Sotomayor was in the bathroom, giving herself an insulin shot, and a woman walked in and accused her of being a drug addict. She corrected the woman and explained she was a diabetic and was injecting medicine. Before writing Just Ask! Be Different, Be Brave, Be You, Sotomayor wrote her first picture book, Turning Pages: My Life Story, illustrated by Lulu Delacre in 2018, and a memoir titled My Beloved World. Sotomayor followed her memoir with an adaptation meant for children 10 years and older titled My Beloved World of Sonia Sotomayor. More recently, Sotomayor published Just Help! How to Build a Better World on January 25, 2022. Illustrator Rafael Lopez wanted to take part in the illustrations for Just Ask! because of his personal experience with dyslexia and his son’s experience with autism spectrum disorder.

== Summary ==
Just Ask! Be Different, Be Brave, Be You follows different kids with disabilities. Sonia Sotomayor utilizes her own experience with diabetes to write about other kids with other disabilities. Some of these disabilities include blindness, deafness, physical impairments, Tourette’s syndrome, down syndrome, and others. This group of kids work together to build a community garden together. Throughout the story, she explores the power of those disabilities and encourages kids to ask each other questions about one another.

== Style ==
Sonia Sotomayor’s writing is matched with illustrations by Rafael Lopez. Lopez utilizes “bold figures” and “vibrant colors.” Kirkus Reviews explains how Lopez created an image of “a garden bursting with assorted blossoms, insects, and birds.” A review from Publishers Weekly explains that Sotomayor utilized “a compassionate, forthright tone.” The book utilizes a style in which it communicates with the readers by asking readers questions too. Just Ask! Be Different, Be Brave, Be You is different from Sotomayor’s other stories as the book is not only autobiographical. However, according to Matia Burnett, Just Ask! is Sotomayor’s “most personal of her books” as she draws on her own experiences with diabetes.

== Analysis ==
The theme of disability is relevant in Just Ask! Be Different, Be Brave, Be You. In addressing the theme of disability, Lori Erbrederis Meyer stated that Just Ask! “provides accurate terminology and information along with highlighting tools, technology, medications, and other supports needed and voiced from the children’s perspective.” According to Matia Burnett of Publishers Weekly, “Sotomayor also aims to counteract the American perception of perfection.” Burnett explains how Sotomayor works to challenge the idea that disabilities are “imperfections.” Kristin Rydholm from The Booklist explains how Sotomayor utilizes a metaphor of a garden by “liken[ing] children to plants in a garden; each different and special.

== Reception ==
An elementary school librarian, Stephanie Conner, used Just Ask! as “a launch pad for some very powerful conversations,” allowing students to be aware of differences between each other and teach them that these differences are normal. In Publishers Weekly, Just Ask! was described as “a quiet musing about how ‘each of us has unique powers to share.’” Kirkus Reviews described the book as “An affirmative, delightfully diverse overview of disabilities.”

In 2020, Just Ask! Won the Schneider Family Book Award for Young Children, which “recognizes excellence in portrayals of disability in children’s literature.”
