= Custodial interrogation =

In United States criminal law, a custodial interrogation (or, generally, custodial situation) is a situation in which the suspect's freedom of movement is restrained, even if they are not under arrest.

== History ==
Per Miranda v. Arizona, 384 U.S. 436, 444 (1966), "custodial interrogation [refers to] questioning initiated by law enforcement officers after a person has been taken into custody or otherwise deprived of his freedom of action in any significant way." The United States Supreme Court has clarified that a person is being subjected to a custodial interrogation if "a reasonable person would have felt he or she was not at liberty to terminate the interrogation and leave." Thompson v. Keohane, 516 U.S. 99, 112 (1995). This test is objective and thus does not depend on the individual suspect's subjective mindset, age, or previous personal experience with law enforcement. Yarborough v. Alvarado, 541 U.S. 652, 666-69 (2004). Rather, the ultimate inquiry is whether a normal, reasonable person would feel free to end the encounter with law enforcement and leave the scene. However, J.D.B. v North Carolina states that a child's age properly informs the Miranda analysis.
