= Yarborough v. Alvarado =

- Supreme Court of the United States

Argued March 1, 2004 Decided June 1, 2004
- Full case name: Michael Yarborough, Warden, Petitioner v. Michael Alvarado
- Citations: 541 U.S. 652 (more) 124 S. Ct. 2140; 158 L. Ed. 2d 938; 2004 U.S. LEXIS 3843; 72 U.S.L.W. 4415; 17 Fla. L. Weekly Fed. S 327
- Argument: Oral argument
- Opinion announcement: Opinion announcement

Case history
- Prior: Alvarado v. Hickman, 316 F.3d 841 (9th Cir. 2002); cert. granted, 539 U.S. 986 (2003).

Holding
- A state court considered the proper factors and reached a reasonable conclusion that a minor was not in custody for Miranda purposes during his police interview, despite the fact that the state court did not consider age or experience with law enforcement in the custody determination.

Court membership
- Chief Justice William Rehnquist Associate Justices John P. Stevens · Sandra Day O'Connor; Antonin Scalia · Anthony Kennedy; David Souter · Clarence Thomas; Ruth Bader Ginsburg · Stephen Breyer

Case opinions
- Majority: Kennedy, joined by Rehnquist, O'Connor, Scalia, Thomas
- Concurrence: O'Connor
- Dissent: Breyer, joined by Stevens, Souter, Ginsburg

Yarborough v. Alvarado, 541 U.S. 652 (2004), is a United States Supreme Court case in which the Court declined to overturn a state court's conclusion that a minor was not in custody for Miranda purposes during his police interview. Michael Alvarado helped his friend Paul Soto steal a truck in Santa Fe Springs, California. The truck owner was killed by Soto during the robbery and Alvarado was convicted of second-degree murder for his role in the crime. The evidence for Alvarado's conviction was primarily based on statements given by Alvarado during a two-hour police interrogation that occurred when Alvarado's parents brought him to the police station. Alvarado was 17 years old and was not read his Miranda rights before questioning. During Alvarado's murder trial in a state court, motions to suppress the statements given by Alvarado were denied on the ground that Alvarado was not in police custody at the time of the interrogation and thus did not have to be read his Miranda rights. Alvarado appealed his conviction, claiming that the determination that he was not in custody was incorrect because the courts did not take his age into account.

In a split decision, the Supreme Court declined to overturn the state court's conclusion about custody because it was not objectively incorrect. The Court noted that there was no precedent that required the use of age in determining whether someone is in police custody (this would change in 2011 with J.D.B. v. North Carolina, which held that age is relevant to determining if someone is in custody). The case has been cited in subsequent Supreme Court decisions as precedent for providing state courts with latitude in making decisions about general or broad rules.

== Background ==
=== Crime and investigation ===
Santa Fe Springs, the location of the murder.

The respondent Michael Alvarado agreed to help his friend Paul Soto steal a truck in the parking lot of a shopping mall in Santa Fe Springs, California. Soto pulled out a gun and approached the driver of the truck, demanding the keys, while Alvarado hid by the driver's side door. The driver refused and was shot and killed by Soto. Afterwards, Alvarado helped hide the gun. Los Angeles County Sheriff's detective Cheryl Comstock led the investigation of the crime. During the investigation Comstock contacted Alvarado's parents, saying that she wished to speak with Alvarado. Alvarado's parents brought him to the police station to be interviewed. Comstock brought Alvarado into an interview room and questioned him for two hours. Alvarado's parents asked to be present during the interview but were not allowed in by police. Alvarado admitted during questions that he had helped his friend try to steal the truck and that he had helped hide the gun.

Before custodial interrogations, police are required to give suspects a Miranda warning that informs suspects of their legal rights during interrogation. However, Alvarado was not given a Miranda warning at any time during questioning. This would form part of the basis for Alvarado's legal defense.

=== Trial and conviction ===
The State of California charged Alvarado and his friend with first-degree murder and attempted robbery. Alvarado attempted to suppress his statements given during the Comstock interview on the basis that he was not read his Miranda rights. The trial court denied the motion on the basis that Alvarado was not in police custody at the time he gave his statement. Alvarado was subsequently convicted, primarily based on statements Alvarado made during his police interrogation. Alvarado's conviction was reduced by the trial judge to second-degree murder for his comparatively minor role in the offense. The California Courts of Appeal affirmed the conviction and agreed that Alvarado was not in custody. The Supreme Court of California declined discretionary review.

Much of Alvarado's trial focused on whether Alvarado was in custody or not during his police interview. According to Thompson v. Keohane, to determine whether someone is in custody the courts apply a reasonable person test: whether a reasonable person would have felt free to leave or not.

=== Petition for habeas corpus ===
After his conviction, Alvarado filed for a writ of habeas corpus claiming that the custody analysis was incorrect because the court had not considered Alvarado's age in its reasonable person test. Under the Antiterrorism and Effective Death Penalty Act of 1996 (AEDPA), a federal court can grant habeas corpus to a person held due to a state court judgment if the state court judgement "resulted in a decision that was contrary to, or involved an unreasonable application of, clearly established Federal law, as determined by the Supreme Court of the United States". Alvarado's habeas corpus petition thus depended on demonstrating that the state court's custody determination was more than debatable, but objectively incorrect.

The United States District Court for the Central District of California agreed that the state court rulings were correct; however, the Court of Appeals for the Ninth Circuit reversed. The Court of Appeals held that the state court made a mistake in not accounting for Alvarado's youth and inexperience when evaluating custody.

== Oral argument ==
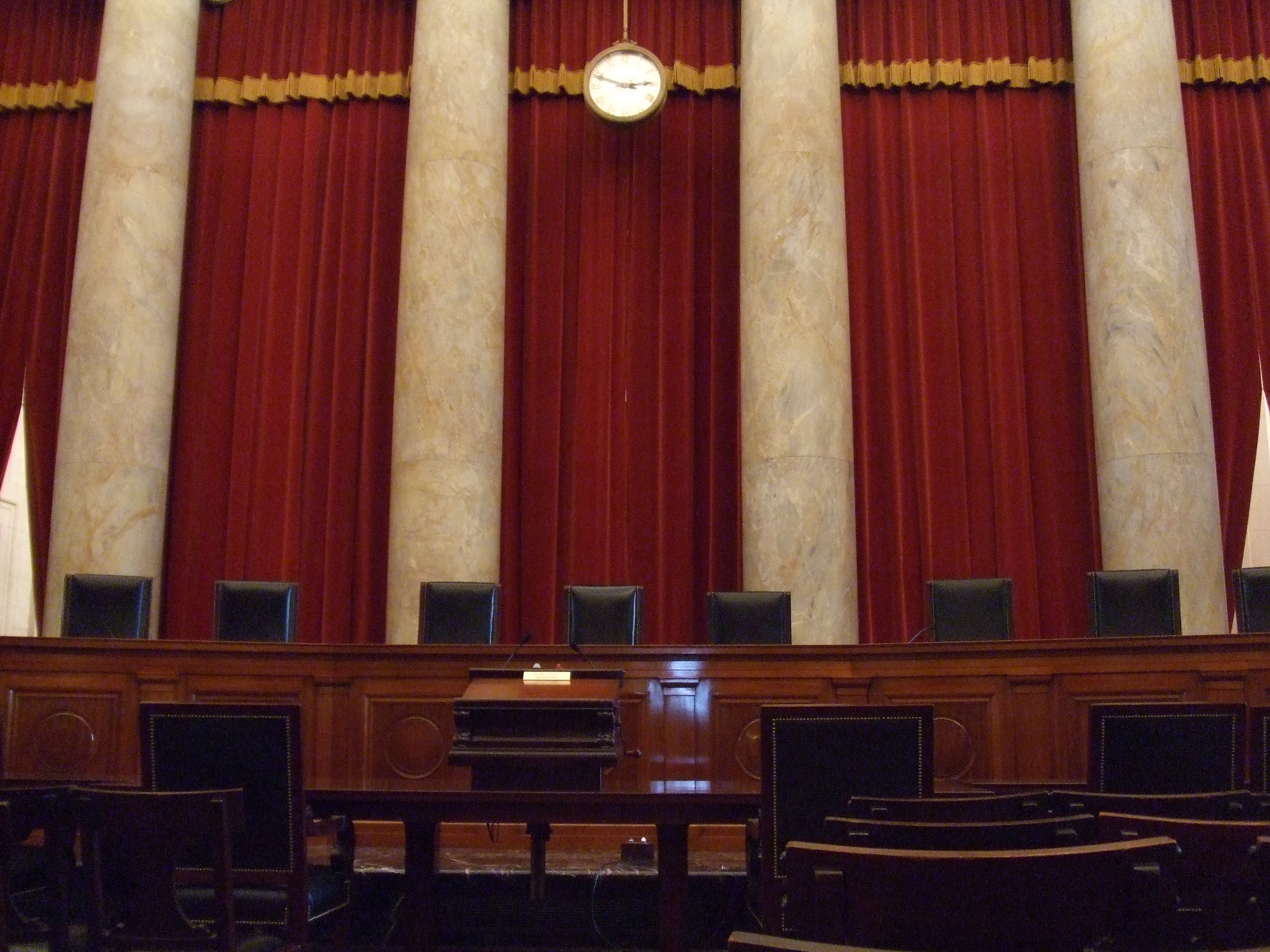
The interior of the United States Supreme Court Building, where oral arguments take place.

Chief Justice William Rehnquist noted early in the oral argument that the case presented two questions. First, whether the Ninth Circuit's ruling was consistent with Supreme Court precedent. Second, whether the state courts' ruling was objectively unreasonable according to AEDPA. California Deputy Attorney General Deborah Chuang argued that the Ninth Circuit's ruling was not consistent with precedent because the Supreme Court had never addressed using age as a factor in custody analysis. Associate Justice Stephen Breyer remarked that he thought a Supreme Court precedent was not necessary because he thought it obvious that age affects whether a reasonable person would feel free to leave. John P. Elwood, at the time assistant to the Solicitor General, argued that age doesn't make a legal difference for Miranda purposes because it is a rule uniformly applied to all people and that police officers should not be required to get inside the head of each suspect.

Tara K. Allen, arguing for Alvarado, claimed that the state court's decision was objectively unreasonable because they did not consider the totality of the circumstances surrounding the investigation as required by Thompson v. Keohane. Specifically, the considered circumstances of custody were not total because Alvarado's age was not considered. Associate Justice Antonin Scalia responded by saying that, according to Thompson v. Keohane, custody is an objective test and subjective factors like characteristics of the individual do not matter.

== Opinion of the Court ==
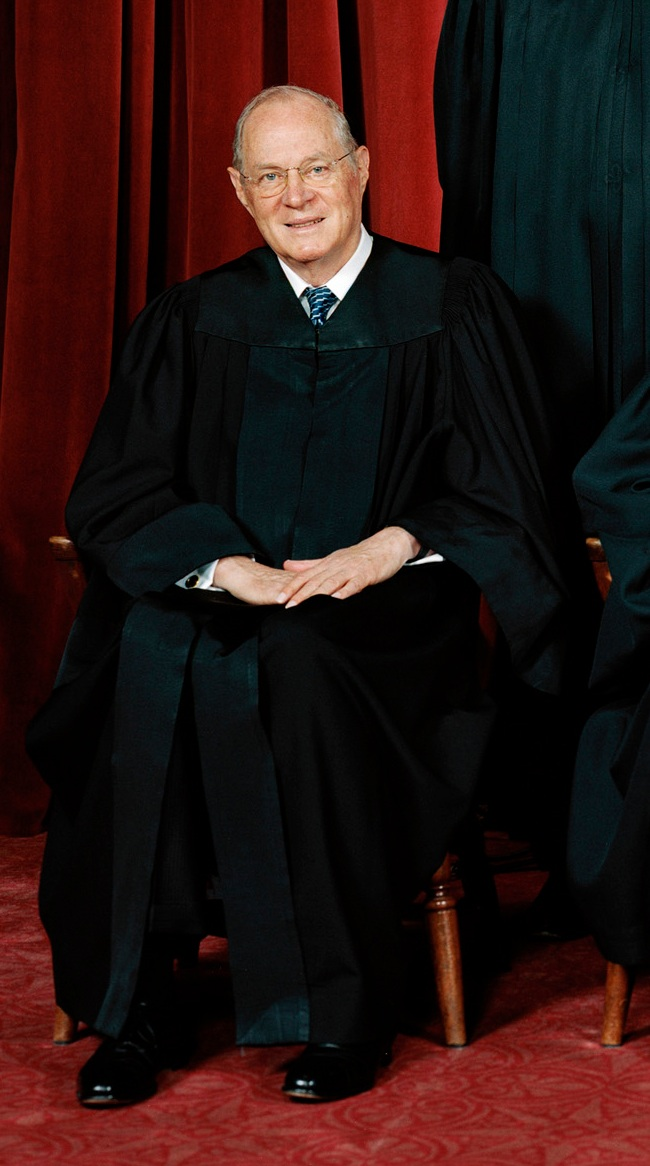
Justice Kennedy, the author of the Court's opinion.

Associate Justice Anthony Kennedy wrote the majority opinion for the Court, which declined to overturn the state court's decision because fair-minded jurists could disagree over whether Alvarado was in custody. Kennedy noted that there were facts for and against the claim that Alvarado was in custody. Facts pointing towards custody included that the interview took place at a police station, the interview lasted for two hours, Alvarado was not told he was free to leave, and Alvarado's parents were not allowed to be present during the interview. Facts weighing against custody included that Alvarado was not transported to the police station by police, Alvarado was not threatened or told he would be placed under arrest, and the interview focused on the crimes of Alvarado's friend, not Alvarado's crimes. The Court was not tasked with conducting a separate inquiry into the issue of custody, rather, the Court was tasked with granting relief only if the lower court's decision is objectively unreasonable. Kennedy wrote that, given this standard, the state court's decision was reasonable because it was not clearly unreasonable.

Central to the reversal of the Ninth Circuit was that the state court did not take into account Alvarado's age and experience with law enforcement in the custody analysis. The Court made several findings on this issue. The Court held that the use of age in custody analysis had not been explicitly required by previous rulings. Inexperience with law enforcement was rejected as well; the Court noted that previous opinions had rejected reliance on such factors.

=== O'Connor's concurrence ===
Associate Justice Sandra Day O'Connor wrote a concurrence that agreed with the finding that the state court's decision was reasonable. However, O'Connor held that there could be cases in which age would be relevant to custody analysis. This would be affirmed by the Court in 2011 in J.D.B. v. North Carolina.

=== Dissent ===
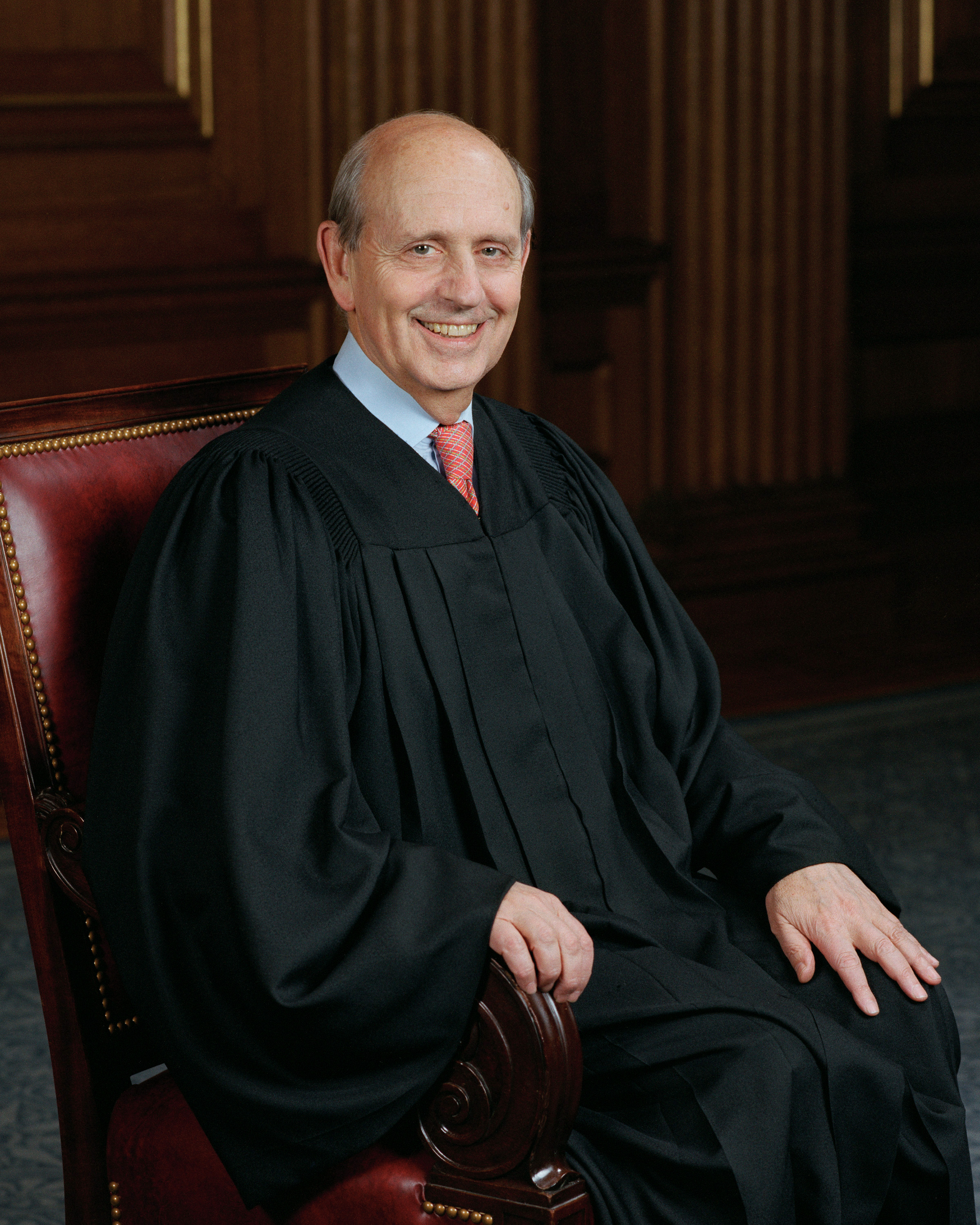
Justice Breyer, the author of the opinion for the dissent

Associate Justice Stephen Breyer wrote a dissenting opinion, with whom Justice Stevens, Justice Souter, and Justice Ginsburg joined. Breyer disagreed with the majority's holding that fair-minded jurists could disagree on whether Alvarado was in custody, holding that the facts compelled the single conclusion that Alvarado was in custody. Breyer held that the actions the police did not do, such as arrest Alvarado or threaten him, were not as important as what the police did do. Specifically, the police had Alvarado's parents bring him to the police station, brought Alvarado to an interrogation room, kept his parents out, and questioned him for two hours.

In the matter of Alvarado's age, Breyer found that it was relevant to the custody analysis. Further, Breyer held that nothing in the law prevents a judge from including age in the custody analysis. Breyer called the discussion of experience with law enforcement misleading; while experience with law enforcement can be difficult to determine, Breyer noted that Alvarado's age was a known objective fact.

== Reception ==
The case received both positive and negative reception in scholarly publications.

=== Support ===
A note published in The Journal of Criminal Law and Criminology supported the decision on procedural grounds, noting that using age in the custody analysis was not a precedent established by the Supreme Court. The note argued that establishing such broad legal precedent was outside the bounds of the authority of the Ninth Circuit and the Supreme Court was right to reverse. Instead, the note supported the state court who had applied the law as the Supreme Court had in the past.

=== Criticism ===
Berry Feld, professor at University of Minnesota Law School, wrote: "the Court's decision ... treated juveniles as the functional equals of adults during interrogation. Over the past quarter-century, developmental psychological research consistently has emphasized adolescents' inability to understand or exercise Miranda rights". Paul Holland, professor at Seattle University School of Law, wrote that "the assumptions Justice Kennedy made in Alvarado are inapplicable to the schoolhouse context ... considering the age of a student-suspect questioned at school, would not present a significant risk of compromising the clarity the Court has sought to provide law enforcement. Officers questioning students at school are well aware of the students' status as minors".

== Role in subsequent decisions ==
=== Leeway granted to state courts ===
Yarborough v. Alvarado has been cited in subsequent Supreme Court decisions as precedent for providing state courts leeway in reaching case by case determinations for general rules.

=== J.D.B. v. North Carolina ===
Though the Court rejected the argument that its previous holdings supported using age in the custody analysis, the Court did not rule against the use of age. In 2011 the Court clarified in J.D.B. v. North Carolina, ruling that a child's age is relevant to custody analysis. J.D.B. was a 13-year-old student who was interrogated at school by an investigator, a uniformed police officer, and school officials regarding a series of robberies. J.D.B. confessed to committing the robberies. He was not given a Miranda warning during the interrogation. Motions to suppress J.D.B.'s statements at trial were denied on the ground that J.D.B. was not in custody. Age was not used as a factor in the custody determination. The Supreme Court found that J.D.B.'s age should have been considered in the custody analysis and instructed the lower court to make a new finding on custody while taking age into account.
