= My Beloved World =

2013 memoir by Sonia Sotomayor

- Author: Sonia Sotomayor
- Language: English
- Subject: Pre-judicial life of author
- Genre: Memoir
- Publisher: Alfred A. Knopf
- Publication date: January 15, 2013
- Publication place: United States
- Media type: Print (Hardcover); Audio (CD, Audiobook); Digital (eBook)
- Pages: 336
- ISBN: 978-0-307-59488-4
- Dewey Decimal: 347.73/2634092
- LC Class: KF8745.S67A3 2013

My Beloved World is a memoir written by Sonia Sotomayor, the first Hispanic justice on the United States Supreme Court, about her childhood, education, and life through 1992.

== Background ==
In July 2010, Sotomayor agreed to publish a memoir, described as "a coming-of-age" book by publisher Alfred A. Knopf, for which she received an advance of nearly $1.2 million. A simultaneous Spanish-language edition was contracted to Vintage Español. Literary agent Peter W. Bernstein represented Sotomayor. Sonny Mehta, Chairman and Editor-in-Chief of the Knopf Doubleday Publishing Group, stated, "Sonia Sotomayor has lived a remarkable life and her achievements will prove an inspiration to readers around the world. Hers is a triumph of the Latino experience in America."

Sotomayor modeled her approach towards the memoir after Barack Obama's Dreams from My Father. It was written by her speaking into a tape recorder and then using the services of Zara Houshmand, an Iranian-American poet, in doing the actual writing. The title comes from a line by José Gautier Benítez, a Puerto Rican poet of the Romantic era in the 19th century.

== Synopsis ==
In recounting her early life, Sotomayor describes growing up in a housing project in the Bronx to Puerto Rican emigrants. Her father was an alcoholic who died when she was nine, and she was subsequently cared for in large part by her grandmother. She tells of developing diabetes at the age of seven and learning to give herself her insulin injections due to the unreliability of her parents. Despite numerous odds, she relates her experiences in becoming valedictorian of her high school class, attending Princeton and then Yale Law School, working for the New York County District Attorney, and finally being appointed a federal judge in New York.

The memoir does not cover aspects of her later life or her appointment to the Supreme Court, aside from incidental mentions. It is apolitical and does not discuss or reveal her legal philosophy. It discusses her 1976 marriage and subsequent divorce in 1983. It reveals many details about her early life that even her closest friends and mother were not previously aware of, as well as many things she had difficulty confronting ("I disclose every fear I've ever had in this book"). It also includes a candid description of the effects of affirmative action upon her at Princeton; she acknowledges that "I had been admitted to the Ivy League through a special door", but concludes that the measures served "to create the conditions whereby students from disadvantaged backgrounds could be brought to the starting line of a race many were unaware was even being run".

== Critical reception ==
Michiko Kakutani of the New York Times describes it as "a compelling and powerfully written memoir about identity and coming of age. ... It’s an eloquent and affecting testament to the triumph of brains and hard work over circumstance, of a childhood dream realized through extraordinary will and dedication." Writing for The New York Times Book Review, Emily Bazelon says, "This is a woman who knows where she comes from and has the force to bring you there." Reporter Adam Liptak of the New York Times, who has covered Sotomayor's judicial career, says that "Sotomayor turns out to be a writer of depth and literary flair, a surprise to readers of her judicial prose."

Nina Totenberg of NPR writes, "This is a page-turner, beautifully written and novelistic in its tale of family, love and triumph. It hums with hope and exhilaration. This is a story of human triumph." NPR's Jason Farago also finds it "intelligent, gregarious and at times disarmingly personal," but also says that "Sotomayor's tone can sometimes irritate when she whips out facile homespun wisdom."

Dahlia Lithwick of The Washington Post states, "Anyone wondering how a child raised in public housing, without speaking English, by an alcoholic father and a largely absent mother could become the first Latina on the Supreme Court will find the answer in these pages. It didn't take just a village: It took a country." Legal scholar Laurence Tribe has referred to My Beloved World as a "captivating memoir".

== Promotional efforts and commercial reception ==
The memoir was simultaneously published in Spanish as Mi mundo adorado, with a translation by Eva Ibarzábal, on the Vintage Español imprint.

Sotomayor staged an eleven-city book tour to promote her work, with appearances intermingled with Supreme Court deliberations in Washington and two swearings-in there of Vice President Joe Biden for the inauguration of his second term. Indeed, the time of Biden's first, official swearing-in (on a Sunday, with the public one held the next day) was moved up from around noon to around 8 a.m. to accommodate Sotomayor's previously arranged book signing at a Barnes & Noble store in New York on Sunday afternoon.

In Sotomayor's appearance on The Daily Show, she described the book's primary purpose as a way "to remember the real Sonia" and to remind herself of her humble beginnings and the obstacles she had to overcome throughout her childhood. A signing at an Austin, Texas book store attracted estimates of 700 to 1,500 people. In an appearance at New York's Spanish Harlem-located El Museo del Barrio before a capacity crowd of 600 people, she engaged the audience by answering questions in both Spanish and English. The popularity of the book caused, in writer Jodi Kantor's estimation, Sotomayor to be "suddenly the nation’s most high-profile Hispanic figure."

My Beloved World debuted at the top of the New York Times Best Seller List for Hardcover Nonfiction for the week of February 3, 2013, a position it retained for several weeks. It sold 38,000 hardback copies in its first week, per Nielsen BookScan, putting it on track to become one of the top-selling books by a Supreme Court justice. For all of 2013, it sold over 190,000 hardcover copies.

== Paperback edition ==
A trade paperback edition of My Beloved World was published in 2014 by Vintage Books.

== Children's adaptation ==
In 2018, an adaptation of the book for middle graders was published by Delacorte Press, entitled The Beloved World of Sonia Sotomayor. The American Library Association describes it as "offer[ing] gentle advice for young readers." The adaptation was a finalist for the 2019 YALSA Award for Excellence in Nonfiction for Young Adults.

== See also ==
- List of Hispanic and Latino Americans
