= Blessed Sacrament Church (Bronx) =

Catholic parish church in New York, US

Coordinates: 40°49′47″N 73°51′56.38″W

The Church of the Blessed Sacrament
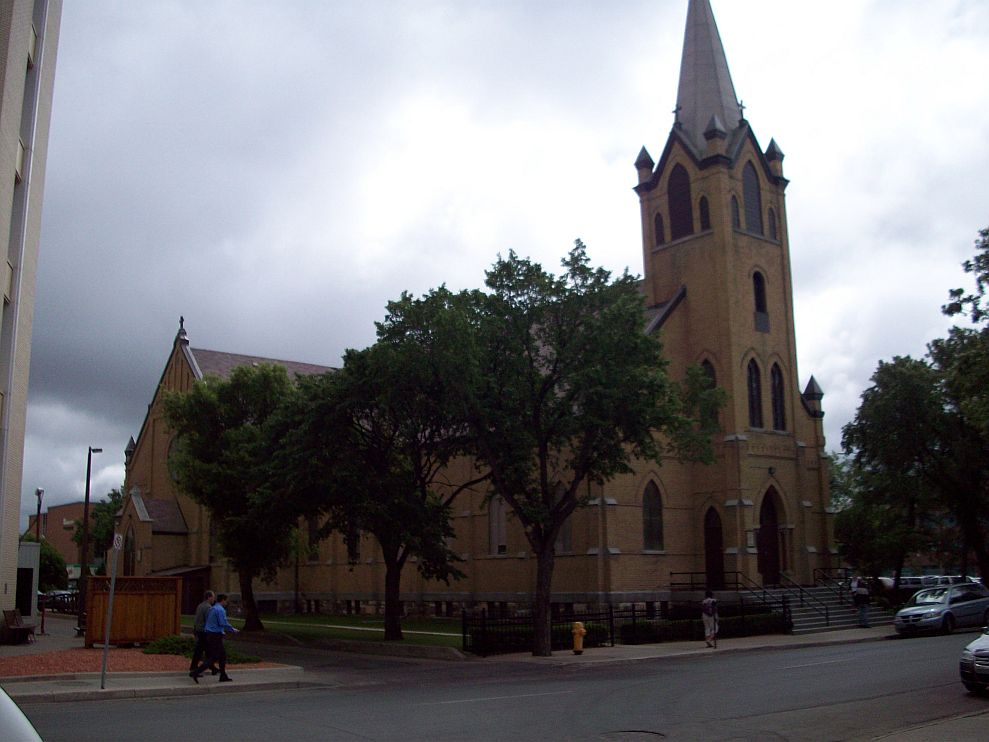
- Blessed Sacrament Church
- Interactive map of the The Church of the Blessed Sacrament area

General information
- Architectural style: Gothic Revival (for church-school) / Modernist (for second school)
- Location: Soundview, the Bronx, New York City, United States
- Construction started: 1928 (for church-school); 1955 (for second school)
- Completed: 1929 (for church-school)
- Client: Roman Catholic Archdiocese of New York

Technical details
- Structural system: Masonry stone (for church-school), brick (for second school)

The Church of the Blessed Sacrament is a Roman Catholic parish church under the authority of the Roman Catholic Archdiocese of New York, located at Beach Avenue and Gleason Avenue, Soundview, the Bronx, New York City. The parish was established in 1927. It was merged into the parish of the Holy Family in 2015.

== Holy Family ==
The Parish of the Holy Family was established in 1896, from St. Raymond's Church. A frame church in Gothic Revival style was built in 1898, followed by a rectory in 1904. The parish school was established in 1913.

=== Pastors ===
- Fr. Joseph Mechler, 1896-1903
- Fr. John de Krom, 1903-1906
- Fr. E. Heinlein, 1906-1907
- Fr. Augustine Stehle, 1907-1912
- Fr. Urban Nageleisen, 1912-

== History ==
Blessed Sacrament Church was founded in 1927 from the parish of the Holy Family. The Gothic Revival church was dedicated by Cardinal Hayes on September 29, 1929. Holy Family is located in the Castle Hill section of the Bronx.

In 2015 Blessed Sacrament Parish was merged with the Parish of the Holy Family.

== Buildings ==
Like many other parish churches with parochial schools in this city, the built structure is a combination with the church on the ground floor and school classrooms above. The cornerstone for the combined structures is dated 1928. It was completed in 1929. An additional brick schoolhouse has a cornerstone dated 1955. The rectory address is 1170 Beach Avenue, Bronx NY 10472.

== School ==
The school was founded around 1929. Judge Sonia Sotomayor attended it from kindergarten through eighth grade, and graduated top of her class in 1968. She was the valedictorian and had a near-perfect attendance record.
