= Stephen A. Shapiro =

American author and psychotherapist

Stephen A. Shapiro was an American author, psychotherapist, management consultant and founding executive of the Volunteer Counselling Service of Rockland County, New York. His most famous book is "Manhood, a new definition," in which inspiring himself from real life cases, personal experience and recent feminist literature, he analyses behavioural patterns of contemporary men and their relationship with women, and suggests solutions to their limits and dissatisfactions. "Manhood" is quoted by Canadian psychoanalyst Guy Corneau in his renowned work "Absent fathers, lost sons" as a landmark in the new movement of masculinity analysis which started in the late 1970s.

== Bibliography ==
- "Trusting yourself: psychotherapy as a beginning", coauthored by Hilary Riglewitz, 1975.
- "Feeling safe: how to clear space for the Self", 1976.
- "Time off: a psychological guide to vacation", 1978.
- "Manhood: a new definition", 1984.
