= Steven R. Shapiro =

American activist

Steven R. Shapiro (born July 24, 1951) is the former National Legal Director of the American Civil Liberties Union (ACLU) from 1993–2016. Shapiro served as counsel or co-counsel on more than 200 briefs submitted to the United States Supreme Court on behalf of the ACLU. When he announced his retirement from the ACLU, Kathleen Sullivan said: “Civil Liberties without Steve Shapiro is like the Rolling Stones without Jagger.”

== Education ==
- J.D., Harvard Law School, 1975
- B.A., Columbia College, 1972

== Career ==
Shapiro was a staff lawyer at the New York Civil Liberties Union from 1976–1987, and the ACLU’s Associate Legal Director from 1987–1993. He began his legal career following graduation from Harvard Law School in 1975 as a law clerk to Judge J. Edward Lumbard of the United States Court of Appeals for the Second Circuit.

After retiring from the ACLU, Shapiro taught at Columbia Law School, Stanford Law School, and the NYU School of Law.

== Personal life ==
Shapiro, who was born and educated in New York City, has been married since 1980 to Nancy Larson Shapiro, the former Executive Director of Teachers & Writers Collaborative. They have one son.

== Professional associations ==
- Trustee, Supreme Court Historical Society (2007– )
- Member, American Academy of Appellate Lawyers
- Member, Policy Committee, Human Rights Watch (2001– )
- Member, Board of Directors, Human Rights First (1984–2007)

== Selected publications ==
- “Reflections on Charlottesville”, 14 Stanford Journal of Civil Rights & Civil Liberties 45 (May 2018), available at https://law.stanford.edu/wp-content/uploads/2018/05/Shapiro-05.28.18.pdf.
- “Bush v. Gore and the 2000 U.S. Presidential Election: A Case Study of the Role of Courts in Political Disputes”, published by The Foundation for Law, Justice and Society in affiliation with The Centre for Socio-Legal Studies, University of Oxford, available at http://www.fljs.org/sites/www.fljs.org/files/publications/Shapiro.pdf.
- "Ideological Exclusions: Closing the Border to Political Dissidents", 100 Harv.L.Rev. 930 (1987)
