= Thompson v. Keohane =

- Supreme Court of the United States

Argued October 11, 1995 Decided November 29, 1995
- Full case name: Carl Thompson, Petitioner v. Patrick Keohane, Warden, et al.
- Citations: 516 U.S. 99 (more) 116 S. Ct. 457; 133 L. Ed. 2d 383; 1995 U.S. LEXIS 8315; 64 U.S.L.W. 4027; 95 Cal. Daily Op. Service 8968; 95 Daily Journal DAR 15680
- Argument: Oral argument

Case history
- Prior: On writ of certiorari to the United States Court of Appeals for the Ninth Circuit

Holding
- 28 U.S.C. § 2254(d) does not apply in custody rulings for Miranda.

Court membership
- Chief Justice William Rehnquist Associate Justices John P. Stevens · Sandra Day O'Connor; Antonin Scalia · Anthony Kennedy; David Souter · Clarence Thomas; Ruth Bader Ginsburg · Stephen Breyer

Case opinions
- Majority: Ginsburg, joined by Stevens, O'Connor, Scalia, Kennedy, Souter, Breyer
- Dissent: Thomas, joined by Rehnquist

Laws applied
- 28 U.S.C. § 2254(d)

Thompson v. Keohane, 516 U.S. 99 (1995), was a case in which the Supreme Court of the United States held that 28 U.S.C. § 2254(d) does not apply in custody rulings for Miranda.

== Background ==
=== Investigation and arrest ===
In September 1986, the body of a dead woman was discovered by two hunters in Fairbanks, Alaska. The woman had been stabbed 29 times. To gain assistance identifying the body, the police issued a press release with a description of the woman. Carl Thompson called the police station and identified the body as Dixie Thompson, his former wife. The police asked Thompson to come into the station under the pretense of identifying personal items found with the body, but it was the intention of the police to question Thompson about the murder.

Thompson came to the police station and was questioned for two hours. Two plainclothes officers performed the interrogation in an interview room. Thompson was not read his Miranda rights and throughout the interrogation he was told that he was free to leave. The police told Thompson that they knew he killed his former wife and eventually Thompson confessed to the murder. Thompson was allowed to leave the police station, but then was arrested shortly thereafter.

=== Trial and conviction ===
Thompson was charged with first-degree murder and put on trial. During the trial, an attempt was made to suppress Thompson's confession because he was not read his Miranda rights. The attempt was denied because the trial court ruled that Thompson was not in police custody and thus the police did not have to read Thompson his Miranda rights. The court concluded that Thompson was not in custody because he came to the police station freely and was told he was free to leave at any time. The prosecution was allowed to play Thompson's tape-recorded confession and the jury convicted Thompson of first-degree murder.

=== Appeals ===
Thompson first attempted to appeal the ruling that he was not in police custody. The Alaska Court of Appeals upheld the ruling of the trial court and Alaska Supreme Court decided not to hear the case.

Thompson then filed a petition for a writ of habeas corpus in the United States District Court for the District of Alaska. The district court deferred to the judgement of the state courts under 28 U.S.C. § 2254(d), which states that in most circumstances questions of fact are presumed correct by appeals courts. The Court of Appeals for the Ninth Circuit affirmed the district court's ruling without publishing an opinion. The Supreme Court decided to hear the case and granted certiorari.

== Opinion of the Court ==
Associate Justice Ruth Bader Ginsburg authored the opinion for the majority. It held that 28 U.S.C. § 2254(d) does not apply in custody rulings for Miranda. As noted previously, 28 U.S.C. § 2254(d) states that federal courts assume state courts to be correct in factual questions. However the Court found that the question of custody for Miranda purposes was mixed question of both fact and law. The Court remanded the case to the Ninth Circuit and instructed them to decide whether Thompson was in custody or not.
