= 2003 term United States Supreme Court opinions of Clarence Thomas =

The 2003 term of the Supreme Court of the United States began October 6, 2003, and concluded October 3, 2004. This was the thirteenth term of Associate Justice Clarence Thomas's tenure on the Court.
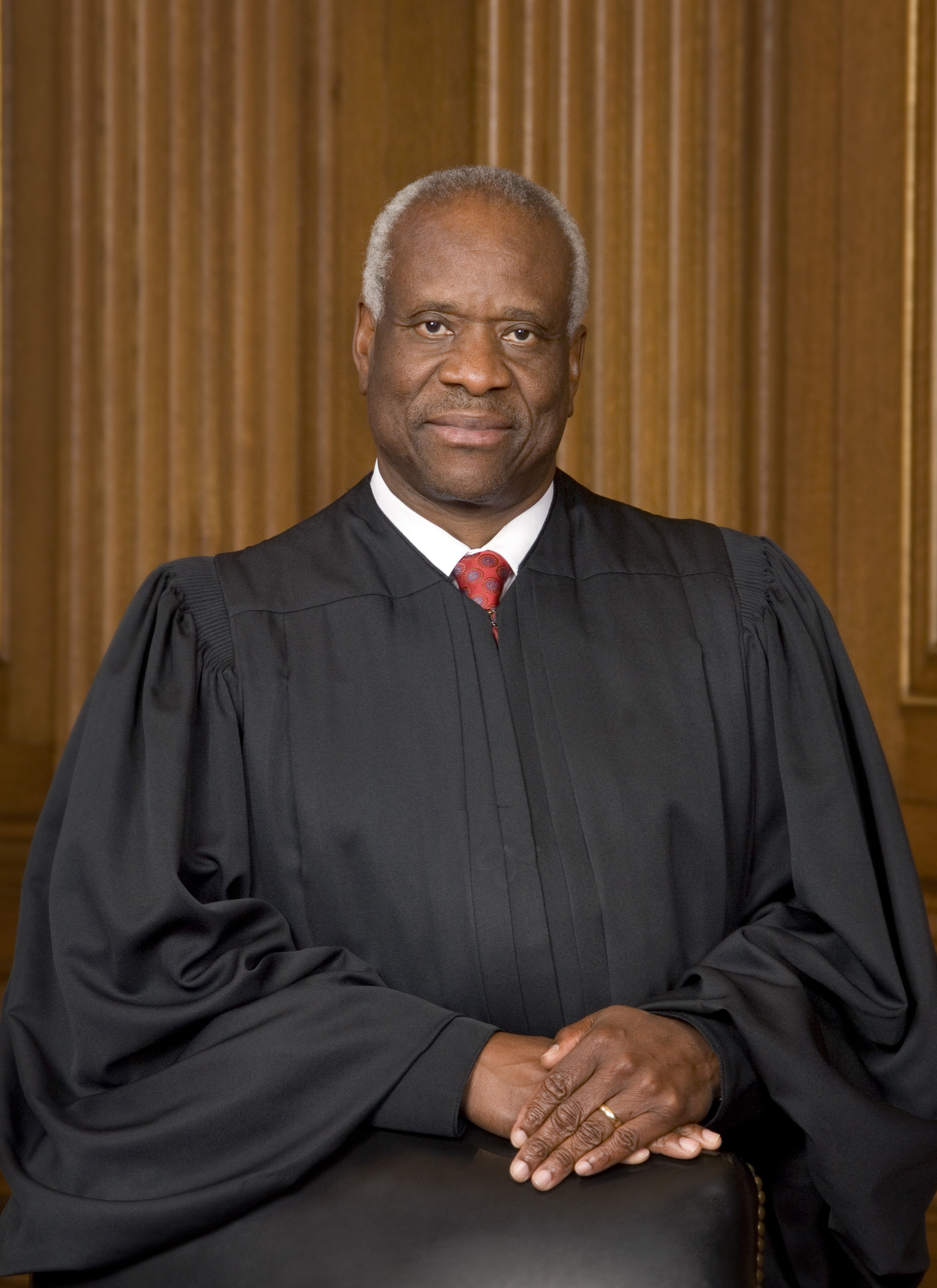

Clarence Thomas 2003 term statistics

9	Majority or plurality	6	Concurrence	0	Other
9	Dissent	3	Concurrence/dissent	Total =	27
Bench opinions = 27		Opinions relating to orders = 0		In-chambers opinions = 0
Unanimous opinions: 4		Most joined by: Scalia (14)		Least joined by: Souter, Breyer (5)

Type	Case	Citation	Issues	Joined by	Other opinions
	Raytheon Co. v. Hernandez	540 U.S. 40 (2003)		Rehnquist, Stevens, O'Connor, Scalia, Kennedy, Ginsburg	
Souter and Breyer did not participate.
	McConnell v. Federal Election Commission	540 U.S. 93 (2003)	Campaign finance reform	Scalia (in part)	Stevens and O'Connor; Rehnquist; Breyer; Scalia; Kennedy; Rehnquist; Stevens
	Groh v. Ramirez	540 U.S. 551 (2004)		Scalia; Rehnquist (in part)	Stevens; Kennedy
	General Dynamics Land Systems, Inc. v. Cline	540 U.S. 581 (2004)		Kennedy	Souter; Scalia
	Olympic Airways v. Husain	540 U.S. 644 (2004)		Rehnquist, Stevens, Kennedy, Souter, Ginsburg	Scalia
	Banks v. Dretke	540 U.S. 668 (2004)		Scalia	Ginsburg
	Locke v. Davey	540 U.S. 712 (2004)			Rehnquist; Scalia
	Raymond B. Yates, M.D., P.C. Profit Sharing Plan v. Hendon	541 U.S. 1 (2004)			Ginsburg; Scalia
	United States v. Galletti	541 U.S. 114 (2004)		Unanimous	
	BedRoc Ltd., LLC v. United States	541 U.S. 176 (2004)		Breyer	Rehnquist; Stevens
	United States v. Lara	541 U.S. 193 (2004)			Breyer; Stevens; Kennedy; Souter
	Household Credit Servs. v. Pfennig	541 U.S. 232 (2004)		Unanimous	
	Scarborough v. Principi	541 U.S. 401 (2004)		Scalia	Ginsburg
	Tennessee Student Assistance Corp. v. Hood	541 U.S. 440 (2004)	Bankruptcy • Eleventh Amendment	Scalia	Rehnquist; Souter
	Till v. SCS Credit Corp.	541 U.S. 465 (2004)	bankruptcy		Stevens; Scalia
	Tennessee v. Lane	541 U.S. 509 (2004)	Americans with Disabilities Act • state sovereign immunity		Stevens; Souter; Ginsburg; Rehnquist; Scalia
	Sabri v. United States	541 U.S. 600 (2004)			Souter; Kennedy
	DOT v. Pub. Citizen	541 U.S. 752 (2004)		Unanimous	
	Elk Grove Unified Sch. Dist. v. Newdow	542 U.S. 1 (2004)	Standing • Establishment Clause		Stevens; Rehnquist; O'Connor
	Pennsylvania State Police v. Suders	542 U.S. 129 (2004)			Ginsburg
	Aetna Health Inc. v. Davila	542 U.S. 200 (2004)		Unanimous	Ginsburg
	Pliler v. Ford	542 U.S. 225 (2004)		Rehnquist, O'Connor, Scalia, Kennedy	Stevens; O'Connor; Ginsburg; Breyer
	Tennard v. Dretke	542 U.S. 274 (2004)			O'Connor; Rehnquist; Scalia
	Cheney v. United States District Court	542 U.S. 367 (2004)		Scalia	Kennedy; Stevens; Ginsburg
	Beard v. Banks	542 U.S. 406 (2004)		Rehnquist, O'Connor, Scalia, Kennedy	Stevens; Souter
	Hamdi v. Rumsfeld	542 U.S. 547 (2004)	Due process • habeas corpus		O'Connor; Souter; Scalia
Thomas dissented from the plurality's ruling that citizens of the U.S. designated as enemy combatants by the Executive Branch had the right to challenge their detention. Thomas, the only member of the Court to fully adopt the government's position, argued that the Court should defer to the broad war-making powers of the President, particularly in light of the important security interests at stake in the War on Terror.
	United States v. Patane	542 U.S. 630 (2004)		Rehnquist, Scalia	Kennedy; Souter; Breyer
