= 2003 term United States Supreme Court opinions of John Paul Stevens =

The 2003 term of the Supreme Court of the United States began October 6, 2003, and concluded October 3, 2004. This was the twenty-ninth term of Associate Justice John Paul Stevens's tenure on the Court.
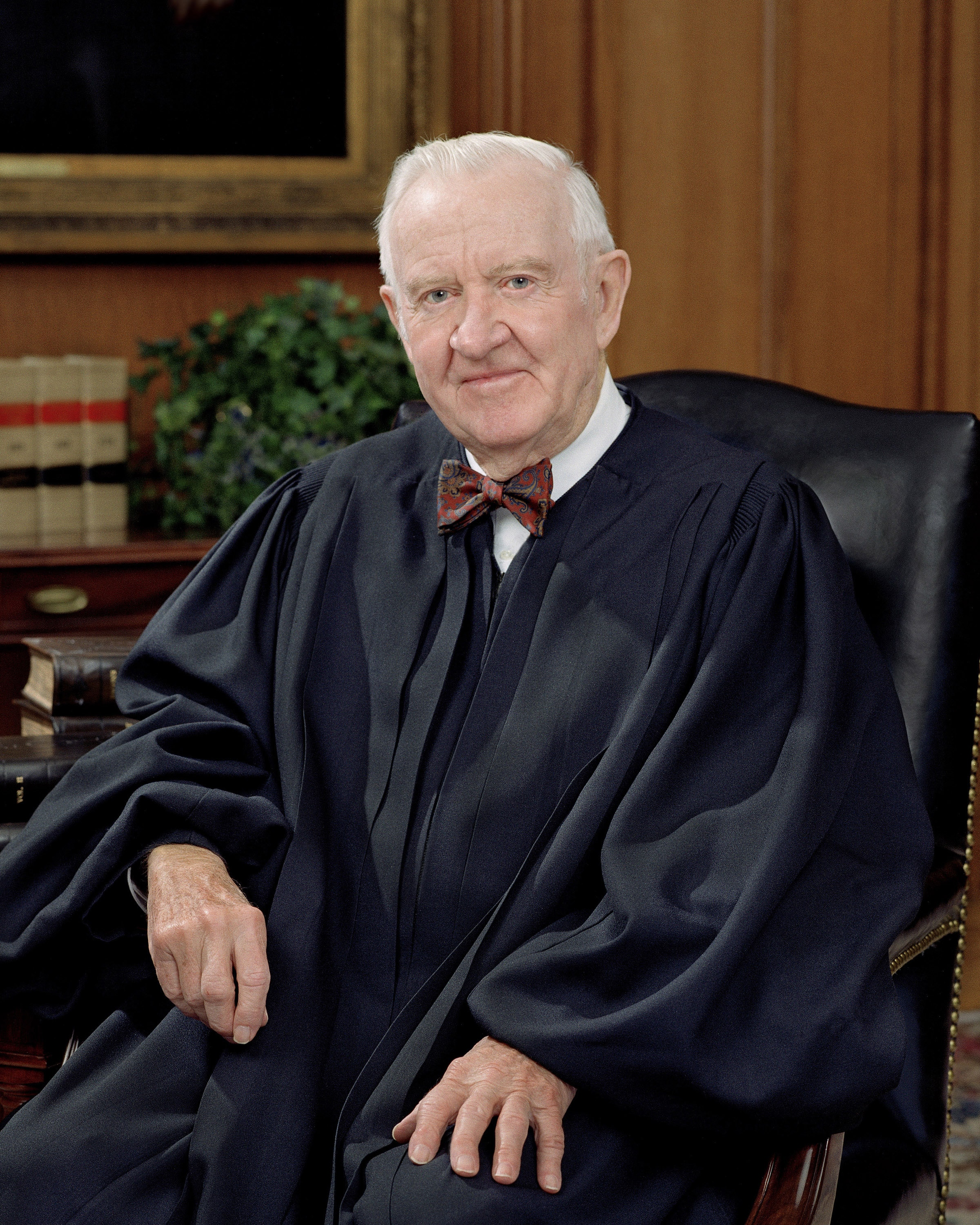

John Paul Stevens 2003 term statistics

8	Majority or plurality	10	Concurrence	2	Other
12	Dissent	1	Concurrence/dissent	Total =	33
Bench opinions = 29		Opinions relating to orders = 4		In-chambers opinions = 0
Unanimous opinions: 1		Most joined by: Souter (18)		Least joined by: Rehnquist (1)

Type	Case	Citation	Issues	Joined by	Other opinions
	Virginia v. Maryland	540 U.S. 56 (2003)		Kennedy	Rehnquist; Kennedy
	McConnell v. Federal Election Commission	540 U.S. 93 (2003)	Campaign finance reform	O'Connor, Souter, Ginsburg, Breyer	Rehnquist; Breyer; Scalia; Kennedy; Thomas; Rehnquist; Stevens
Stevens co-authored one of three partial opinions for the Court.
	McConnell v. Federal Election Commission	540 U.S. 93 (2003)	Campaign finance reform	Ginsburg, Breyer	Stevens and O'Connor; Rehnquist; Breyer; Scalia; Kennedy; Thomas; Rehnquist
	Verizon Comm., Inc. v. Law Offices of Curtis V. Trinko, LLP	540 U.S. 398 (2004)		Souter, Thomas	Scalia
	Illinois v. Lidster	540 U.S. 419 (2004)		Souter, Ginsburg	Breyer
	Lamie v. United States Trustee	540 U.S. 526 (2004)		Souter, Breyer	Kennedy
	Illinois v. Fisher	540 U.S. 544 (2004)			per curiam
	Groh v. Ramirez	540 U.S. 551 (2004)		O'Connor, Souter, Ginsburg, Breyer	Kennedy; Thomas
	Torres v. Mullin	540 U.S. 1035 (2004)	Vienna Convention on Consular Relations		Breyer
Stevens filed an opinion respecting the Court's denial of certiorari.
	Zimmerman v. Johnson	540 U.S. 1087 (2004)	Death penalty	Souter, Ginsburg, Breyer	
Stevens dissented from the Court's denial of a stay of execution, and vacation of a temporary stay entered by Scalia.
	Baldwin v. Reese	541 U.S. 27 (2004)			Breyer
	Nixon v. Missouri Municipal League	541 U.S. 125 (2004)			Souter; Scalia
	BedRoc Ltd., LLC v. United States	541 U.S. 176 (2004)		Souter, Ginsburg	Rehnquist; Thomas
	United States v. Lara	541 U.S. 193 (2004)			Breyer; Kennedy; Thomas; Souter
	Vieth v. Jubelirer	541 U.S. 267 (2004)			Scalia; Kennedy; Souter; Breyer
	Jones v. R. R. Donnelley & Sons Co.	541 U.S. 369 (2004)		Unanimous	
	Dretke v. Haley	541 U.S. 386 (2004)		Kennedy, Souter	O'Connor; Kennedy
	Till v. SCS Credit Corp.	541 U.S. 465 (2004)	Bankruptcy	Souter, Ginsburg, Breyer	Thomas; Scalia
	Tennessee v. Lane	541 U.S. 509 (2004)	Americans with Disabilities Act; state sovereign immunity	O'Connor, Souter, Ginsburg, Breyer	Souter; Ginsburg; Rehnquist; Scalia; Thomas
	Thornton v. United States	541 U.S. 615 (2004)		Souter	Rehnquist; O'Connor; Scalia
	Republic of Austria v. Altmann	541 U.S. 677 (2004)	Foreign Sovereign Immunities Act	O'Connor, Scalia, Souter, Ginsburg, Breyer	Scalia; Breyer; Kennedy
	City of Littleton v. Z. J. Gifts D-4, L.L.C.	541 U.S. 774 (2004)			Breyer; Scalia; Souter
	Bunting v. Mellen	541 U.S. 1019 (2004)		Ginsburg, Breyer	Scalia
Stevens filed an opinion respecting the Court's denial of certiorari.
	Elk Grove Unified Sch. Dist. v. Newdow	542 U.S. 1 (2004)	Standing	Kennedy, Souter, Ginsburg, Breyer	Rehnquist; O'Connor; Thomas
	Hibbs v. Winn	542 U.S. 88 (2004)			Ginsburg; Kennedy
	Hiibel v. Sixth Judicial District Court of Nevada	542 U.S. 177 (2004)	Rights of the accused		Kennedy; Breyer
	Pliler v. Ford	542 U.S. 225 (2004)		Souter	Thomas; O'Connor; Ginsburg; Breyer
	Cheney v. United States District Court	542 U.S. 367 (2004)			Kennedy; Thomas; Ginsburg
	Beard v. Banks	542 U.S. 406 (2004)		Souter, Ginsburg, Breyer	Thomas; Souter
	Rumsfeld v. Padilla	542 U.S. 426 (2004)		Souter, Ginsburg, Breyer	Rehnquist; Kennedy
	Rasul v. Bush	542 U.S. 466 (2004)		O'Connor, Souter, Ginsburg, Breyer	Kennedy; Scalia
	Ashcroft v. American Civil Liberties Union	542 U.S. 656 (2004)		Ginsburg	Kennedy; Scalia; Breyer
	Cox v. Larios	542 U.S. 947 (2004)	Electoral redistricting	Breyer	Scalia
Stevens concurred in the Court's summary affirmance.
