= 2003 term United States Supreme Court opinions of Anthony Kennedy =

The 2003 term of the Supreme Court of the United States began October 6, 2003, and concluded October 3, 2004. This was the seventeenth term of Associate Justice Anthony Kennedy's tenure on the Court.
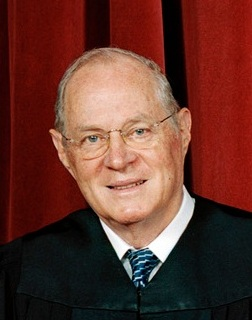

Anthony Kennedy 2003 term statistics

8	Majority or plurality	7	Concurrence	0	Other
7	Dissent	1	Concurrence/dissent	Total =	23
Bench opinions = 23		Opinions relating to orders = 0		In-chambers opinions = 0
Unanimous opinions: 3		Most joined by: Rehnquist, Thomas (12)		Least joined by: Souter, Ginsburg (5)

Type	Case	Citation	Issues	Joined by	Other opinions
	Virginia v. Maryland	540 U.S. 56 (2003)		Stevens	Rehnquist; Stevens
	McConnell v. Federal Election Commission	540 U.S. 93 (2003)	Campaign finance reform • U.S. Const. amend. I • McCain-Feingold Act	Rehnquist; Scalia, Thomas (in part)	Stevens and O'Connor; Rehnquist; Breyer; Scalia; Thomas; Rehnquist; Stevens
	Frew v. Hawkins	540 U.S. 431 (2004)		Unanimous	
	Alaska Dep't of Envtl. Conservation v. EPA	540 U.S. 461 (2004)		Rehnquist, Scalia, Thomas	Ginsburg
	Lamie v. United States Trustee	540 U.S. 526 (2004)		Rehnquist, O'Connor, Souter, Thomas, Ginsburg, Breyer; Scalia (in part)	Stevens
	Groh v. Ramirez	540 U.S. 551 (2004)		Rehnquist	Stevens; Thomas
	United States Postal Serv. v. Flamingo Indus. (USA) Ltd.	540 U.S. 736 (2004)		Unanimous	
	Nat'l Archives & Records Admin. v. Favish	541 U.S. 157 (2004)		Unanimous	
	United States v. Lara	541 U.S. 193 (2004)			Breyer; Stevens; Thomas; Souter
	Vieth v. Jubelirer	541 U.S. 267 (2004)			Scalia; Stevens; Souter; Breyer
	Dretke v. Haley	541 U.S. 386 (2004)			O'Connor; Stevens
	Sabri v. United States	541 U.S. 600 (2004)		Scalia	Souter; Thomas
	Yarborough v. Alvarado	541 U.S. 652 (2004)		Rehnquist, O'Connor, Scalia, Thomas	O'Connor; Breyer
	Republic of Austria v. Altmann	541 U.S. 677 (2004)	Foreign Sovereign Immunities Act	Rehnquist, Thomas	Stevens; Scalia; Breyer
	Hibbs v. Winn	542 U.S. 88 (2004)		Rehnquist, Scalia, Thomas	Ginsburg; Stevens
	Hiibel v. Sixth Judicial District Court of Nevada	542 U.S. 177 (2004)		Rehnquist, O'Connor, Scalia, Thomas	Stevens; Breyer
	Blakely v. Washington	542 U.S. 296 (2004)	right to jury trial	Breyer	Scalia; O'Connor; Breyer
	Cheney v. United States District Court	542 U.S. 367 (2004)		Rehnquist, Stevens, O'Connor, Breyer; Scalia, Thomas (in part)	Stevens; Thomas; Ginsburg
	Rumsfeld v. Padilla	542 U.S. 426 (2004)		O'Connor	Rehnquist; Stevens
	Rasul v. Bush	542 U.S. 466 (2004)			Stevens; Scalia
	Missouri v. Seibert	542 U.S. 600 (2004)			Souter; Breyer; O'Connor
	United States v. Patane	542 U.S. 630 (2004)		O'Connor	Thomas; Souter; Breyer
	Ashcroft v. American Civil Liberties Union	542 U.S. 656 (2004)		Stevens, Souter, Thomas, Ginsburg	Stevens; Scalia; Breyer
