= 2003 term United States Supreme Court opinions of Ruth Bader Ginsburg =

The 2003 term of the Supreme Court of the United States began October 6, 2003, and concluded October 3, 2004. This was the eleventh term of Associate Justice Ruth Bader Ginsburg's tenure on the Court.
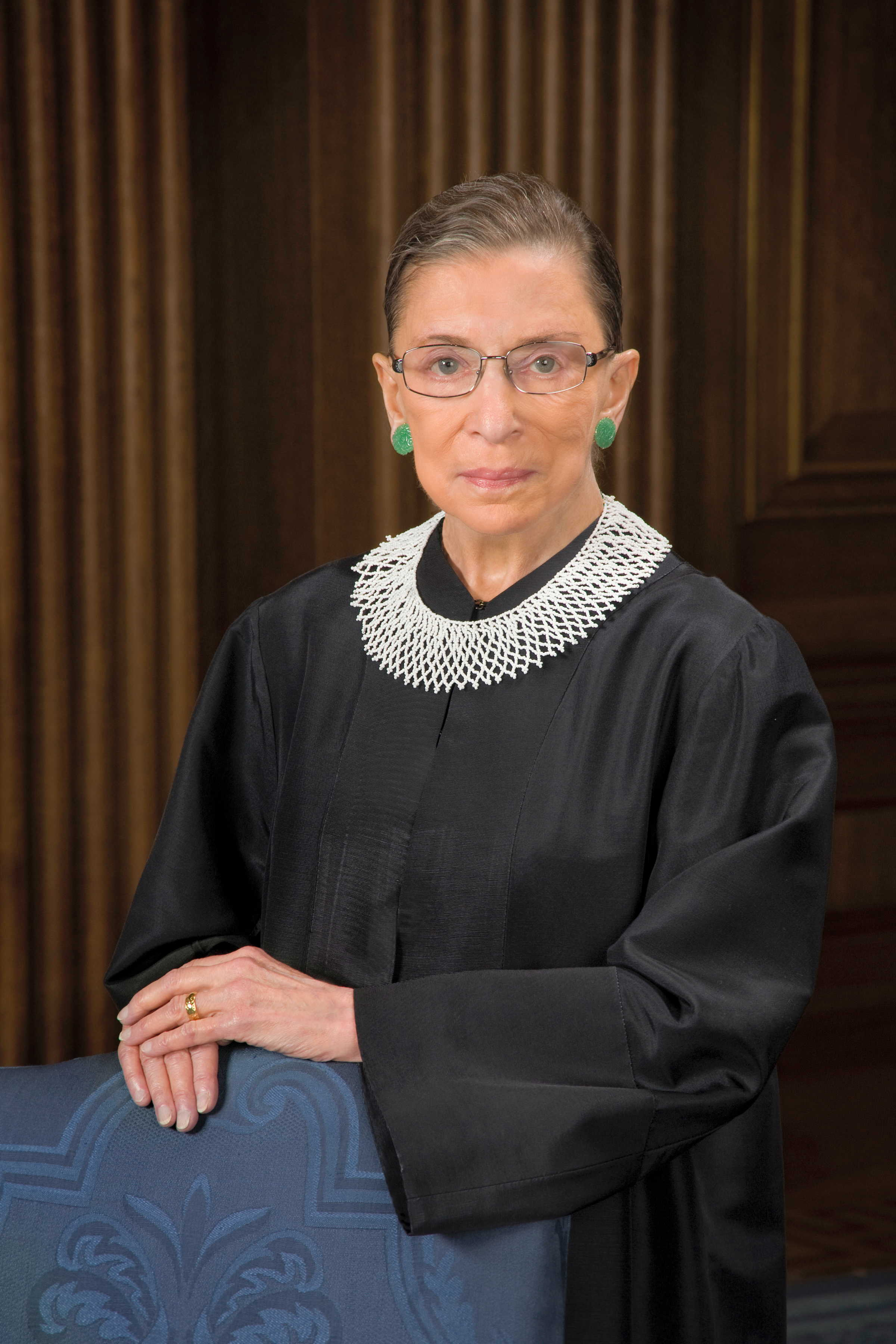

Ruth Bader Ginsburg 2003 term statistics

9	Majority or plurality	3	Concurrence	0	Other
4	Dissent	0	Concurrence/dissent	Total =	16
Bench opinions = 16		Opinions relating to orders = 0		In-chambers opinions = 0
Unanimous opinions: 2		Most joined by: Breyer (14)		Least joined by: Scalia, Thomas (4)

Type	Case	Citation	Issues	Joined by	Other opinions
	Kontrick v. Ryan	540 U.S. 443 (2004)		Unanimous	
	Alaska Dep't of Envtl. Conservation v. EPA	540 U.S. 461 (2004)		Stevens, O'Connor, Souter, Breyer	Kennedy
	Doe v. Chao	540 U.S. 614 (2004)	Privacy Act of 1974	Stevens, Breyer	Souter; Breyer
	Banks v. Dretke	540 U.S. 668 (2004)		Rehnquist, Stevens, O'Connor, Kennedy, Souter, Breyer; Scalia, Thomas (in part)	Thomas
	Raymond B. Yates, M.D., P.C. Profit Sharing Plan v. Hendon	541 U.S. 1 (2004)		Rehnquist, Stevens, O'Connor, Kennedy, Souter, Breyer	Scalia; Thomas
	Iowa v. Tovar	541 U.S. 77 (2004)		Unanimous	
	Scarborough v. Principi	541 U.S. 401 (2004)		Rehnquist, Stevens, O'Connor, Kennedy, Souter, Breyer	Thomas
	Tennessee v. Lane	541 U.S. 509 (2004)	Americans with Disabilities Act • Eleventh Amendment	Souter, Breyer	Stevens; Souter; Rehnquist; Scalia; Thomas
	Grupo Dataflux v. Atlas Global Group, L.P.	541 U.S. 567 (2004)		Stevens, Souter, Breyer	Scalia
	Hibbs v. Winn	542 U.S. 88 (2004)		Stevens, O'Connor, Souter, Breyer	Stevens; Kennedy
	Pennsylvania State Police v. Suders	542 U.S. 129 (2004)		Rehnquist, Stevens, O'Connor, Scalia, Kennedy, Souter, Breyer	Thomas
	Aetna Health Inc. v. Davila	542 U.S. 200 (2004)		Breyer	Thomas
	Pliler v. Ford	542 U.S. 225 (2004)		Breyer	Thomas; Stevens; O'Connor; Breyer
	Intel Corp. v. Advanced Micro Devices, Inc.	542 U.S. 241 (2004)	U.S. enforcement of discovery requests for foreign litigation	Rehnquist, Stevens, Kennedy, Souter, Thomas	Scalia; Breyer
	Cheney v. United States District Court	542 U.S. 367 (2004)		Souter	Kennedy; Stevens; Thomas
	Sosa v. Alvarez-Machain	542 U.S. 642 (2004)		Breyer	Souter; Scalia; Breyer
