= 2003 term United States Supreme Court opinions of Antonin Scalia =

The 2003 term of the Supreme Court of the United States began October 6, 2003, and concluded October 3, 2004. This was the eighteenth term of Associate Justice Antonin Scalia's tenure on the Court.
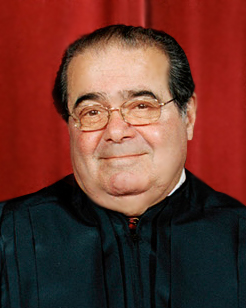

Antonin Scalia 2003 term statistics

9	Majority or plurality	10	Concurrence	1	Other
12	Dissent	2	Concurrence/dissent	Total =	34
Bench opinions = 30		Opinions relating to orders = 4		In-chambers opinions = 0
Unanimous opinions: 2		Most joined by: Thomas (14)		Least joined by: Souter (4)

Type	Case	Citation	Issues	Joined by	Other opinions
	Barnhart v. Thomas	540 U.S. 20 (2003)		Unanimous	
	McConnell v. Federal Election Commission	540 U.S. 93 (2003)	U.S. Const. amend. I • campaign finance reform		Stevens and O'Connor; Rehnquist; Breyer; Kennedy; Thomas; Rehnquist; Stevens
	Castro v. United States	540 U.S. 375 (2003)		Thomas	Breyer
	Verizon Communications Inc. v. Law Offices of Curtis V. Trinko LLP	540 U.S. 398 (2004)	Antitrust • telecommunications	Rehnquist, O'Connor, Kennedy, Ginsburg, Breyer	Stevens
Scalia's 6-justice majority ruled that the allegation that an incumbent LEC had breached its duty under the Telecommunications Act of 1996 to share its network with competitors failed to state a claim under § 2 of the Sherman Act.
	General Dynamics Land Systems, Inc. v. Cline	540 U.S. 581 (2004)	Employment discrimination		Souter; Thomas
Scalia dissented from Souter's 6-3 judgment that the EEOC had incorrectly interpreted the ADEA as prohibiting employers from favoring older over younger workers. Scalia would defer to the EEOC, whose regulation he believed was a reasonable interpretation of a statute that did not unambiguously require a different interpretation.
	Olympic Airways v. Husain	540 U.S. 644 (2004)	Warsaw Convention	O'Connor (in part)	Thomas
Scalia dissented from Thomas' 6-2 decision, which he criticized for failing to give any serious consideration to how courts of the partners of the U.S. in the Warsaw Convention had resolved the same legal issues
	Locke v. Davey	540 U.S. 712 (2004)	Establishment Clause • state funding of religious education	Thomas	Rehnquist; Thomas
Scalia dissented from Rehnquist's 7–2 decision. Scalia believed that Washington's scholarship program facially discriminated against religion by excluding only theology from the applicable subjects of study, "no less than if it had imposed a special tax." Scalia believed the plaintiff student was not asking for a "special benefit," but instead sought "only equal treatment."
	Concrete Works of Colorado, Inc. v. City and County of Denver	540 U.S. 1027 (2003)		Rehnquist	
Scalia dissented from the denial of certiorari.
	Raymond B. Yates, M.D., P.C. Profit Sharing Plan v. Hendon	541 U.S. 1 (2004)			Ginsburg; Thomas
Scalia believed that the Court "use[d] a sledgehammer to kill a gnat...The Department [of Revenue]'s interpretive conclusion is certainly reasonable (the Court's lengthy analysis says that it is inevitable); it is therefore binding upon us. I would reverse the judgment of the Sixth Circuit on that basis. The Court's approach, which denies many agency interpretations their conclusive effect and thrusts the courts into authoritative judicial interpretation, deprives administrative agencies of two of their principal virtues: (1) the power to resolve statutory questions promptly, and with nationwide effect, and (2) the power (within the reasonable bounds of the text) to change the application of ambiguous laws as time and experience dictate. The Court's approach invites lengthy litigation in all the circuits--the product of which (when finally announced by this Court) is a rule of law that only Congress can change."
	Crawford v. Washington	541 U.S. 36 (2004)	U.S. Const. amend. VI • Confrontation Clause	Stevens, Kennedy, Souter, Thomas, Ginsburg, Breyer	Rehnquist
The Court ruled that the use in court of out-of-court statements made to police in an investigative capacity violated the Sixth Amendment right to confront accusing witnesses.
	Cheney v. United States District Court	540 U.S. 913 (2004)	Recusal		
Scalia declined to recuse himself from a case involving Vice-President Cheney, who had recently provided Scalia with a plane ride to a duck-hunting trip. Scalia remarked that "[i]f it is reasonable to think that a Supreme Court Justice can be bought so cheap, the Nation is in deeper trouble than I had imagined." He also did not believe his friendship with the Vice-President demanded recusal, because Cheney's "personal fortune or personal freedom were not at issue," only his official actions in a "run-of-the-mill legal dispute about an administrative decision."
	S. Fla. Water Mgmt. Dist. v. Miccosukee Tribe of Indians	541 U.S. 95 (2004)			O'Connor
Scalia also joined the majority's decision in part.
	Nixon v. Missouri Municipal League	541 U.S. 125 (2004)		Thomas	Souter; Stevens
	Engine Mfrs. Ass'n v. S. Coast Air Quality Mgmt. Dist.	541 U.S. 246 (2004)		Rehnquist, Stevens, O'Connor, Kennedy, Thomas, Ginsburg, Breyer	Souter
	Vieth v. Jubelirer	541 U.S. 267 (2004)		Rehnquist, O'Connor, Thomas	Kennedy; Stevens; Souter; Breyer
	Till v. SCS Credit Corp.	541 U.S. 465 (2004)		Rehnquist, O'Connor, Kennedy	Stevens; Thomas
	Tennessee v. Lane	541 U.S. 509 (2004)	Sovereign immunity • U.S. Const. amend. XI • Americans with Disabilities Act		Stevens; Souter; Ginsburg; Rehnquist; Thomas
	Grupo Dataflux v. Atlas Global Group, L.P.	541 U.S. 567 (2004)		Rehnquist, O'Connor, Kennedy, Thomas	Ginsburg
	Thornton v. United States	541 U.S. 615 (2004)		Ginsburg	Rehnquist; O'Connor; Stevens
	Republic of Austria v. Altmann	541 U.S. 677 (2004)	Foreign Sovereign Immunities Act		Stevens; Breyer; Kennedy
Scalia also joined Stevens' 6-3 majority opinion.
	City of Littleton v. Z. J. Gifts D-4, L.L.C.	541 U.S. 774 (2004)			Breyer; Stevens; Souter
	Bunting v. Mellen	541 U.S. 1019 (2004)	U.S. Const. amend. I • Establishment Clause	Rehnquist	Stevens
Scalia dissented from the denial of certiorari.
	F. Hoffmann-La Roche Ltd v. Empagran S. A.	542 U.S. 155 (2004)		Thomas	Breyer
	United States v. Dominguez Benitez	542 U.S. 74 (2004)			Souter
	Norton v. S. Utah Wilderness Alliance	542 U.S. 55 (2004)		Unanimous	
	Intel Corp. v. Advanced Micro Devices, Inc.	542 U.S. 241 (2004)			Ginsburg; Breyer
	Blakely v. Washington	542 U.S. 296 (2004)	U.S. Const. amend. VI • right to jury trial	Stevens, Souter, Thomas, Ginsburg	O'Connor; Kennedy; Breyer
Scalia wrote for five justices invalidating criminal sentencing system in which judges were the finders of fact for aggravating factors. O'Connor, Kennedy, and Breyer filed dissents.
	Schriro v. Summerlin	542 U.S. 348 (2004)		Rehnquist, O'Connor, Kennedy, Thomas	Breyer
	Tennard v. Dretke	542 U.S. 274 (2004)			O'Connor; Rehnquist; Thomas
	Rasul v. Bush	542 U.S. 466 (2004)		Rehnquist, Thomas	Stevens; Kennedy
	Hamdi v. Rumsfeld	542 U.S. 507 (2004)	U.S. Const. amend. V • habeas corpus	Stevens	O'Connor; Souter; Thomas
Scalia wrote that if habeas corpus has not been suspended by Congress, U.S. citizens must be tried in ordinary criminal courts. He believed the plurality was misguided in attempting to fashion alternative procedures that might comply with due process, because the role of the Court was simply to declare that the procedures at issue were unconstitutional.
	Ashcroft v. American Civil Liberties Union	542 U.S. 656 (2004)			Kennedy; Stevens; Breyer
	Sosa v. Alvarez-Machain	542 U.S. 692 (2004)		Rehnquist, Thomas	Souter; Ginsburg; Breyer
Scalia concurred in part and concurred in the judgment.
	Cox v. Larios	542 U.S. 947 (2004)	Legislative redistricting		Stevens
Scalia dissented from the Court's summary affirmance.
