= 2003 term United States Supreme Court opinions of David Souter =

The 2003 term of the Supreme Court of the United States began October 6, 2003, and concluded October 3, 2004. This was the fourteenth term of Associate Justice David Souter's tenure on the Court.
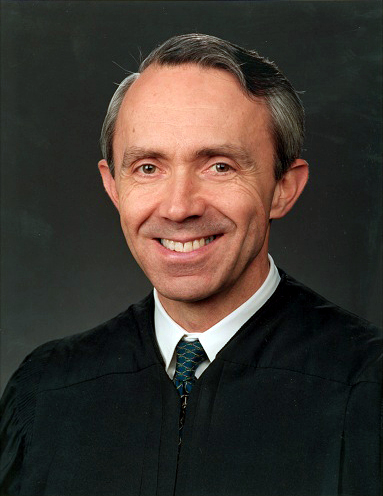

David Souter 2003 term statistics

9	Majority or plurality	3	Concurrence	0	Other
5	Dissent	1	Concurrence/dissent	Total =	18
Bench opinions = 18		Opinions relating to orders = 0		In-chambers opinions = 0
Unanimous opinions: 2		Most joined by: Ginsburg (14)		Least joined by: Scalia, Thomas (5)

Type	Case	Citation	Issues	Joined by	Other opinions
	United States v. Banks	540 U.S. 31 (2003)		Unanimous	
	General Dynamics Land Systems, Inc. v. Cline	540 U.S. 581 (2003)		Rehnquist, Stevens, O'Connor, Ginsburg, Breyer	Scalia; Thomas
	Doe v. Chao	540 U.S. 614 (2004)		Rehnquist, O'Connor, Scalia, Kennedy, Thomas	Ginsburg; Breyer
	Nixon v. Missouri Municipal League	541 U.S. 125 (2004)		Rehnquist, O'Connor, Kennedy, Ginsburg, Breyer	Scalia; Stevens
	United States v. Lara	541 U.S. 193 (2004)		Scalia	Breyer; Stevens; Kennedy; Thomas
	Engine Mfrs. Ass'n v. S. Coast Air Quality Mgmt. Dist.	541 U.S. 246 (2004)			Scalia
	Vieth v. Jubelirer	541 U.S. 267 (2004)		Ginsburg	Scalia; Kennedy; Stevens; Breyer
	Tennessee Student Assistance Corp. v. Hood	541 U.S. 440 (2004)	bankruptcy • state sovereign immunity	Ginsburg	Rehnquist; Thomas
	Tennessee v. Lane	541 U.S. 509 (2004)	Americans with Disabilities Act • state sovereign immunity	Ginsburg	Stevens; Ginsburg; Rehnquist; Scalia; Thomas
	Sabri v. United States	541 U.S. 600 (2004)		Rehnquist, Stevens, O'Connor, Ginsburg, Breyer; Scalia, Kennedy (in part)	Kennedy; Thomas
	Central Laborers' Pension Fund v. Heinz	541 U.S. 739 (2004)		Unanimous	Breyer
	City of Littleton v. Z. J. Gifts D-4, L.L.C.	541 U.S. 774 (2004)		Kennedy	Breyer; Stevens; Scalia
	United States v. Dominguez Benitez	542 U.S. 74 (2004)	criminal procedure	Rehnquist, Stevens, O'Connor, Kennedy, Thomas, Ginsburg, Breyer	Scalia
Souter's opinion for the Court held that a defendant attempting to reverse his conviction due to a Fed. R. Crim. P. 11 violation must show a reasonable probability that, but for the trial court's error in failing to advise him his guilty plea could not be withdrawn, he would not have entered the plea. Justice Antonin Scalia concurred in the judgment but disagreed with Souter's standard.
	Beard v. Banks	542 U.S. 406 (2004)		Ginsburg	Thomas; Stevens
	Hamdi v. Rumsfeld	542 U.S. 507 (2004)	Due Process • habeas corpus	Ginsburg	O'Connor; Scalia; Thomas
	Missouri v. Seibert	542 U.S. 600 (2004)		Stevens, Ginsburg, Breyer	Kennedy; Breyer; O'Connor
	United States v. Patane	542 U.S. 630 (2004)		Stevens, Ginsburg	Thomas; Kennedy; Breyer
	Sosa v. Alvarez-Machain	542 U.S. 692 (2004)		Stevens, O'Connor, Kennedy; Rehnquist, Scalia, Thomas, Ginsburg, Breyer (in part)	Scalia; Ginsburg; Breyer
