= 2003 term United States Supreme Court opinions of Stephen Breyer =

The 2003 term of the Supreme Court of the United States began October 6, 2003, and concluded October 3, 2004. This was the tenth term of Associate Justice Stephen Breyer's tenure on the Court.
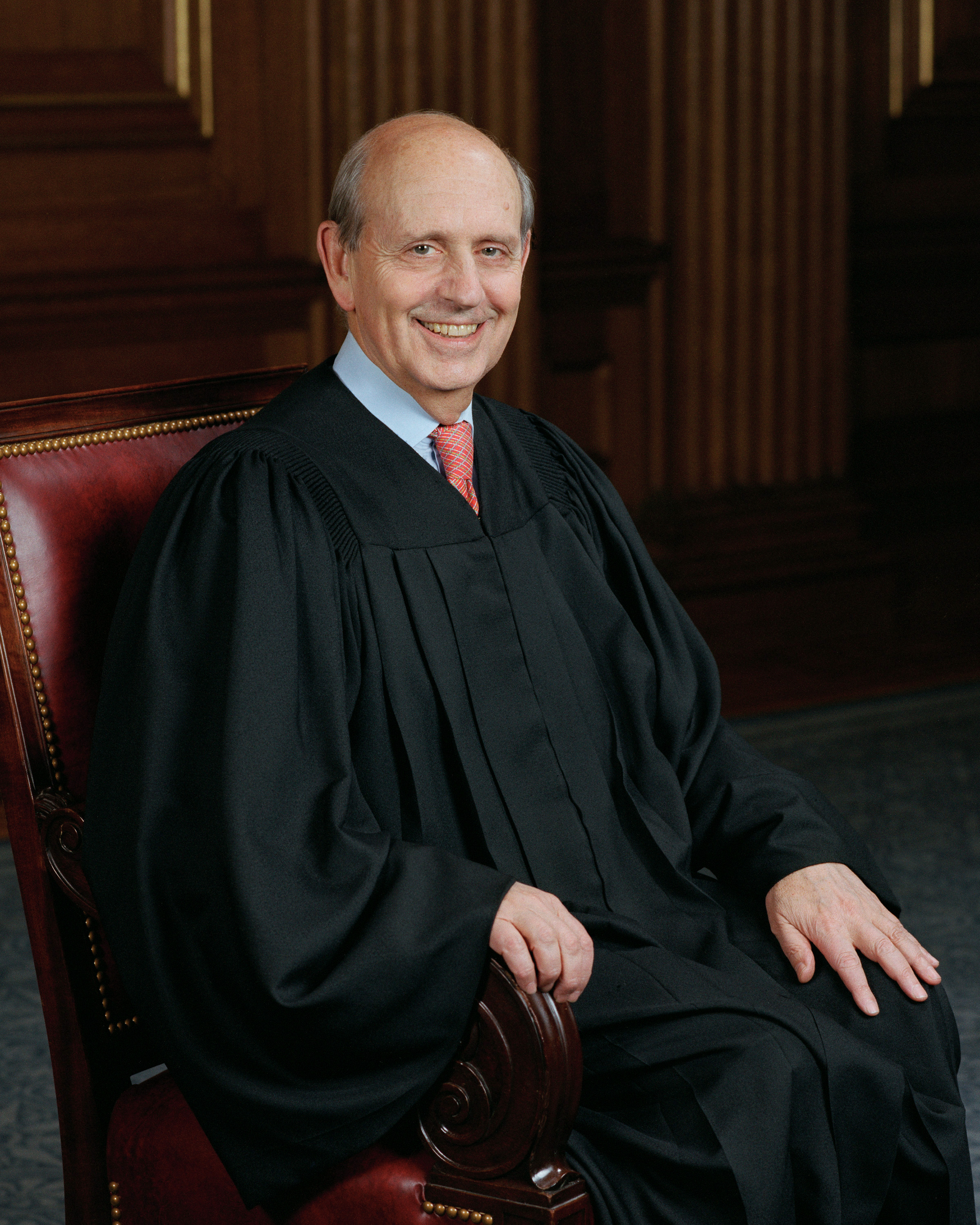

Stephen Breyer 2003 term statistics

7	Majority or plurality	5	Concurrence	1	Other
11	Dissent	0	Concurrence/dissent	Total =	24
Bench opinions = 22		Opinions relating to orders = 1		In-chambers opinions = 1
Unanimous opinions: 0		Most joined by: Ginsburg (11)		Least joined by: Scalia (3)

Type	Case	Citation	Issues	Joined by	Other opinions
	McConnell v. Federal Election Commission	540 U.S. 93 (2003)	Campaign finance reform	Stevens, O'Connor, Souter, Ginsburg	Stevens and O'Connor; Rehnquist; Scalia; Kennedy; Thomas; Rehnquist; Stevens
	Castro v. United States	540 U.S. 375 (2003)		Rehnquist, Stevens, O'Connor, Kennedy, Souter, Ginsburg; Scalia, Thomas (in part)	Scalia
	Illinois v. Lidster	540 U.S. 419 (2004)		Rehnquist, O'Connor, Scalia, Kennedy, Thomas; Stevens, Souter, Ginsburg (in part)	Stevens
	Doe v. Chao	540 U.S. 614 (2004)	Privacy Act of 1974		Souter; Ginsburg
	Torres v. Mullin	540 U.S. 1035 (2004)	Vienna Convention on Consular Relations		Stevens
Breyer dissented from the Court's denial of certiorari.
	Baldwin v. Reese	541 U.S. 27 (2004)		Rehnquist, O'Connor, Scalia, Kennedy, Souter, Thomas, Ginsburg	Stevens
	United States v. Flores-Montano	541 U.S. 149 (2004)			Rehnquist
	United States v. Lara	541 U.S. 193 (2004)		Rehnquist, Stevens, O'Connor, Ginsburg	Stevens; Kennedy; Thomas; Souter
	Vieth v. Jubelirer	541 U.S. 267 (2004)			Scalia; Kennedy; Stevens; Souter
	Yarborough v. Alvarado	541 U.S. 652 (2004)		Stevens, Souter, Ginsburg	Kennedy; O'Connor
	Republic of Austria v. Altmann	541 U.S. 677 (2004)	Foreign Sovereign Immunities Act	Souter	Stevens; Scalia; Kennedy
	Central Laborers' Pension Fund v. Heinz	541 U.S. 739 (2004)		Rehnquist, O'Connor, Ginsburg	Souter
	City of Littleton v. Z. J. Gifts D-4, L.L.C.	541 U.S. 774 (2004)		Rehnquist, O'Connor, Thomas, Ginsburg; Stevens, Kennedy, Souter (in part)	Stevens; Scalia; Souter
	F. Hoffmann-La Roche Ltd v. Empagran S. A.	542 U.S. 155 (2004)		Rehnquist, Stevens, Kennedy, Souter, Ginsburg	Scalia
	Hiibel v. Sixth Judicial District Court of Nevada	542 U.S. 177 (2004)	Fourth Amendment	Souter, Ginsburg	Kennedy; Stevens
	Pliler v. Ford	542 U.S. 225 (2004)			Thomas; Stevens; O'Connor; Ginsburg
	Intel Corp. v. Advanced Micro Devices, Inc.	542 U.S. 241 (2004)	Discovery aid by U.S. district courts to foreign tribunals		Ginsburg; Scalia
	Blakely v. Washington	542 U.S. 296 (2004)	Right to jury trial	O'Connor	Scalia; O'Connor; Kennedy
	Schriro v. Summerlin	542 U.S. 348 (2004)		Stevens, Souter, Ginsburg	Scalia
	Missouri v. Seibert	542 U.S. 600 (2004)			Souter; Kennedy; O'Connor
	United States v. Patane	542 U.S. 630 (2004)			Thomas; Kennedy; Souter
	Ashcroft v. American Civil Liberties Union	542 U.S. 656 (2004)		Rehnquist, O'Connor	Kennedy; Stevens; Scalia
	Sosa v. Alvarez-Machain	542 U.S. 692 (2004)			Souter; Scalia; Ginsburg
	Associated Press v. District Court for Fifth Judicial Dist. of Colo.	542 U.S. 1301 (2004)			
Breyer denied the application for a stay.
