= 2003 term United States Supreme Court opinions of William Rehnquist =

The 2003 term of the Supreme Court of the United States began October 6, 2003, and concluded October 3, 2004. This was the thirty-second term of Chief Justice William Rehnquist's tenure on the Court and the eighteenth term as Chief Justice.
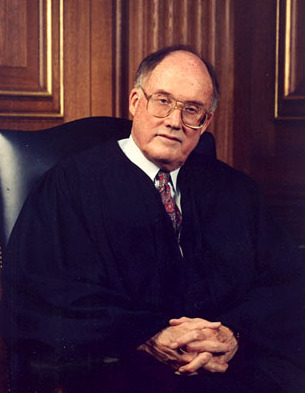

William Rehnquist 2003 term statistics

9	Majority or plurality	2	Concurrence	1	Other
4	Dissent	0	Concurrence/dissent	Total =	16
Bench opinions = 14		Opinions relating to orders = 1		In-chambers opinions = 1
Unanimous opinions: 2		Most joined by: O'Connor (11)		Least joined by: Stevens (5)

Type	Case	Citation	Issues	Joined by	Other opinions
	Virginia v. Maryland	540 U.S. 56 (2003)		O'Connor, Scalia, Souter, Thomas, Ginsburg, Breyer	Stevens; Kennedy
	McConnell v. Federal Election Commission	540 U.S. 93 (2003)	campaign finance reform	O'Connor, Scalia, Kennedy, Souter; Stevens, Thomas, Ginsburg, Breyer (in part)	Stevens and O'Connor; Breyer; Scalia; Kennedy; Thomas; Rehnquist; Stevens
Rehnquist filed one of three opinions for the Court.
	McConnell v. Federal Election Commission	540 U.S. 93 (2003)	campaign finance reform	Scalia, Kennedy	Stevens and O'Connor; Rehnquist; Breyer; Scalia; Kennedy; Thomas; Stevens
	Maryland v. Pringle	540 U.S. 366 (2003)		Unanimous	
	Locke v. Davey	540 U.S. 712 (2004)	Establishment Clause • public funding	Stevens, O'Connor, Kennedy, Souter, Ginsburg, Breyer	Scalia; Thomas
The Court upheld a state scholarship program that excluded only theology students from consideration.
	Crawford v. Washington	541 U.S. 36 (2004)	Confrontation Clause • hearsay	O'Connor	Scalia
	United States v. Flores-Montano	541 U.S. 149 (2004)		Unanimous	Breyer
	BedRoc Ltd., LLC v. United States	541 U.S. 176 (2004)		O'Connor, Scalia, Kennedy	Thomas; Stevens
	Tennessee Student Assistance Corp. v. Hood	541 U.S. 440 (2004)	Bankruptcy • state sovereignty	Stevens, O'Connor, Kennedy, Souter, Ginsburg, Breyer	Souter; Thomas
	Tennessee v. Lane	541 U.S. 509 (2004)	State sovereignty • Americans with Disabilities Act	Kennedy, Thomas	Stevens; Souter; Ginsburg; Scalia; Thomas
	Thornton v. United States	541 U.S. 615 (2004)		Kennedy, Thomas, Breyer; O'Connor (in part)	O'Connor; Scalia; Stevens
	Colorado General Assembly v. Salazar	541 U.S. 1093 (2004)	electoral redistricting	Scalia, Thomas	
Rehnquist dissented from the Court's denial of certiorari, arguing that the Court should review the Colorado Supreme Court's interpretation of the Federal Elections Clause in the U.S. Constitution that it was up to each state to decide for itself what "Legislature" meant in the context of what branch of government was empowered to redraw legislative districts.
	Elk Grove Unified School District v. Newdow	542 U.S. 1 (2004)	Article III standing • Establishment Clause	O'Connor; Thomas (in part)	Stevens; O'Connor; Thomas
	Tennard v. Dretke	542 U.S. 274 (2004)			O'Connor; Scalia; Thomas
	Rumsfeld v. Padilla	542 U.S. 426 (2004)		O'Connor, Scalia, Kennedy, Thomas	Kennedy; Stevens
	Wisconsin Right to Life, Inc. v. Federal Election Commission	542 U.S. 1305 (2004)	campaign finance reform		
Rehnquist denied a request for an injunction pending appeal.
