= 2003 term United States Supreme Court opinions of Sandra Day O'Connor =

The 2003 term of the Supreme Court of the United States began October 6, 2003, and concluded October 3, 2004. This was the twenty-third term of Associate Justice Sandra Day O'Connor's tenure on the Court.
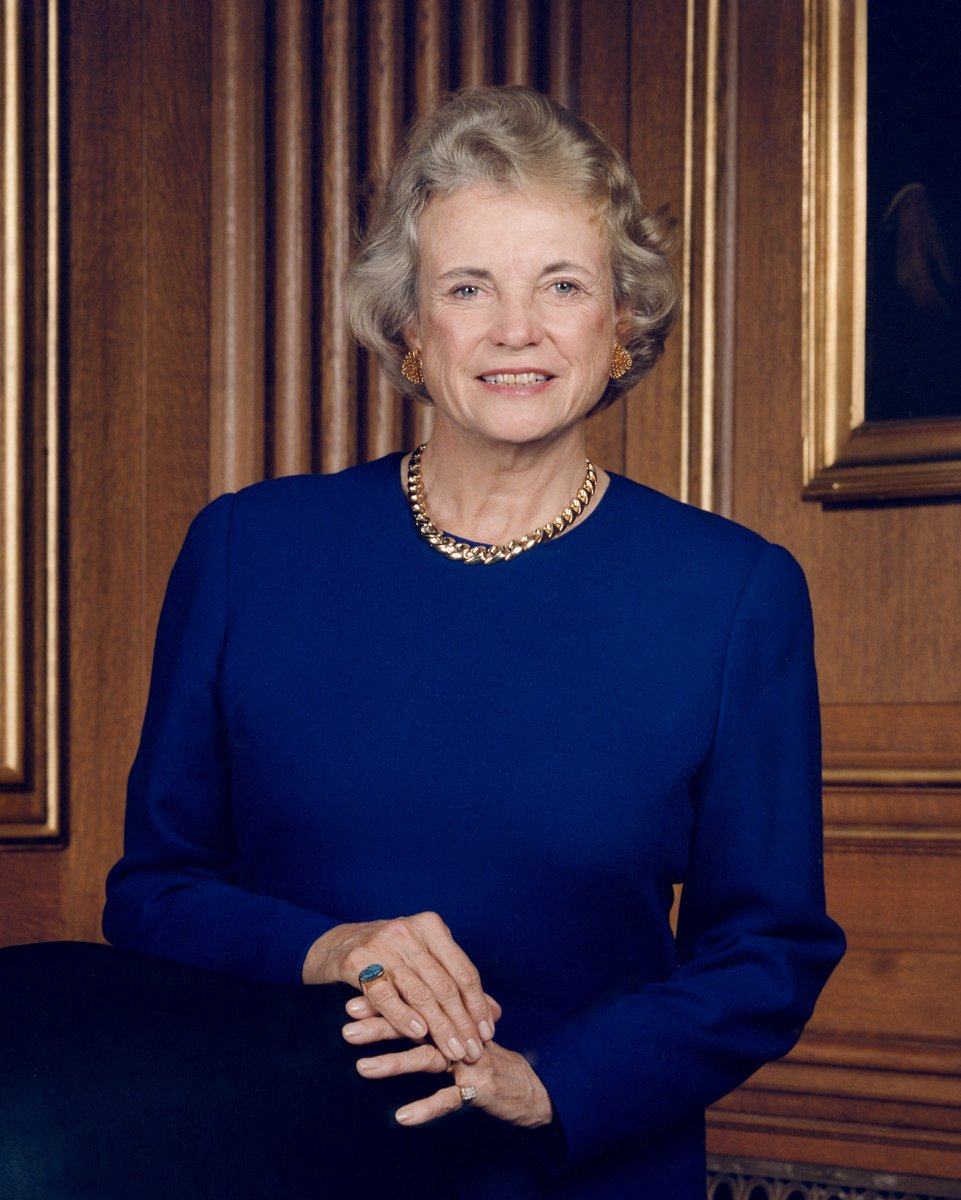

Sandra Day O'Connor 2003 term statistics

| 8 | Majority or plurality | 4 | Concurrence | 0 | Other |
| 2 | Dissent | 0 | Concurrence/dissent | Total = | 14 |
| Bench opinions = 14 | | Opinions relating to orders = 0 | | In-chambers opinions = 0 |
| Unanimous opinions: 3 | | Most joined by: Breyer (9) | | Least joined by: Stevens, Scalia, Souter, Thomas (6) |

| Type | Case | Citation | Issues | Joined by | Other opinions |
|---|---|---|---|---|---|
| | McConnell v. Federal Election Commission | 540 U.S. 93 (2003) | | Stevens, Souter, Ginsburg, Breyer | Rehnquist; Breyer; Scalia; Kennedy; Thomas; Rehnquist; Stevens |
O'Connor co-authored with Stevens one of three opinions for the Court.
| | SEC v. Edwards | 540 U.S. 519 (2004) | | Unanimous | |
| | Fellers v. United States | 540 U.S. 519 (2004) | | Unanimous | |
| | S. Fla. Water Mgmt. Dist. v. Miccosukee Tribe of Indians | 541 U.S. 95 (2004) | | Rehnquist, Stevens, Kennedy, Souter, Thomas, Ginsburg, Breyer; Scalia (in part) | Scalia |
| | Dretke v. Haley | 541 U.S. 386 (2004) | | Rehnquist, Scalia, Thomas, Ginsburg, Breyer | Stevens; Kennedy |
| | Thornton v. United States | 541 U.S. 615 (2004) | | | Rehnquist; Scalia; Stevens |
| | Nelson v. Campbell | 541 U.S. 637 (2004) | | Unanimous | |
| | Yarborough v. Alvarado | 541 U.S. 652 (2004) | | | Kennedy; Breyer |
| | Elk Grove Unified Sch. Dist. v. Newdow | 542 U.S. 1 (2004) | First Amendment • Establishment Clause • Article Three • standing | | Stevens; Rehnquist; Thomas |
| | Pliler v. Ford | 542 U.S. 225 (2004) | | | Thomas; Stevens; Ginsburg; Breyer |
| | Tennard v. Dretke | 542 U.S. 274 (2004) | | Stevens, Kennedy, Souter, Ginsburg, Breyer | Rehnquist; Scalia; Thomas |
| | Blakely v. Washington | 542 U.S. 296 (2004) | | Breyer; Rehnquist, Kennedy (in part) | Scalia; Kennedy; Breyer |
| | Hamdi v. Rumsfeld | 542 U.S. 507 (2004) | | Rehnquist, Kennedy, Breyer | Souter; Scalia; Thomas |
| | Missouri v. Seibert | 542 U.S. 600 (2004) | | Rehnquist, Scalia, Thomas | Souter; Kennedy; Breyer |
