= List of United States Supreme Court cases, volume 542 =

This is a list of all the United States Supreme Court cases from volume 542 of the United States Reports:

Case name	Citation	Date decided
Elk Grove Unified School Dist. v. Newdow	542 U.S. 1	June 14, 2004
Norton v. S. Utah Wilderness Alliance	542 U.S. 55	2004
United States v. Dominguez Benitez	542 U.S. 74	2004
Hibbs v. Winn	542 U.S. 88	2004
Pa. State Police v. Suders	542 U.S. 129	2004
F. Hoffmann-La Roche Ltd v. Empagran S.A.	542 U.S. 155	2004
Where price-fixing conduct significantly and adversely affects both customers outside and within the United States but the adverse foreign effect is independent of any adverse domestic effect, neither the FTAIA exception nor the Sherman Act applies to a claim based solely on the foreign effect.
Hiibel v. Dist. Ct.	542 U.S. 177	2004
Aetna Health Inc. v. Davila	542 U.S. 200	2004
Pliler v. Ford	542 U.S. 225	2004
District court judges are not required to provide pro se petitioners with warnings about the stay-and-abeyance option for federal habeas corpus proceedings.
Intel Corp. v. Advanced Micro Devices, Inc.	542 U.S. 241	2004
Tennard v. Dretke	542 U.S. 274	2004
Blakely v. Washington	542 U.S. 296	2004
Schriro v. Summerlin	542 U.S. 348	2004
Cheney_v._United_States_District_Court	542 U.S. 367	2004
Beard v. Banks	542 U.S. 406	2004
Rumsfeld v. Padilla	542 U.S. 426	2004
Rasul v. Bush	542 U.S. 466	2004
Hamdi v. Rumsfeld	542 U.S. 507	2004
Missouri v. Seibert	542 U.S. 600	2004
United States v. Patane	542 U.S. 630	2004
Holland v. Jackson	542 U.S. 649	2004
Ashcroft v. ACLU	542 U.S. 656	2004
Sosa v. Alvarez-Machain	542 U.S. 692	2004
