= Aetna Health Inc. v. Davila =

- Supreme Court of the United States

Argued March 23, 2004 Decided June 21, 2004
- Full case name: Aetna Health Inc., fka Aetna U.S. Healthcare Inc. et al. v. Davila; CIGNA Healthcare of Texas, Inc. v. Ruby R. Calad, et al.
- Citations: 542 U.S. 200 (more) 124 S. Ct. 2488; 159 L. Ed. 2d 312

Case history
- Prior: Roark ex rel. Estate of Roark v. Humana, Inc., 307 F.3d 298 (5th Cir. 2002); cert. granted, 540 U.S. 981 (2003).

Court membership
- Chief Justice William Rehnquist Associate Justices John P. Stevens · Sandra Day O'Connor; Antonin Scalia · Anthony Kennedy; David Souter · Clarence Thomas; Ruth Bader Ginsburg · Stephen Breyer

Case opinions
- Majority: Thomas, joined by unanimous
- Concurrence: Ginsburg, joined by Breyer

Aetna Health Inc. v. Davila, 542 U.S. 200 (2004), was a United States Supreme Court case in which the Court limited the scope of the Texas Healthcare Liability Act (THCLA). The effective result of this decision was that the THCLA, which held case management and utilization review decisions by managed care entities like CIGNA and Aetna to a legal duty of care according to the laws of the State of Texas could not be enforced in the case of Health Benefit plans provided through private employers, because the Texas statute allowed compensatory or punitive damages to redress losses or deter future transgressions, which were not available under section 502 of the Employee Retirement Income Security Act (ERISA) (29 U.S.C. § 1132). The ruling still allows the State of Texas to enforce the THCLA in the case of government-sponsored (Medicare, Medicaid, federal, state, municipal employee, church-sponsored, individual health plan policies, high-deductible individual policies, self-pay, and any insurance not subsidized by a private employer), which are saved from preemption by ERISA. The history of private and self-pay insurance dates back to the "Interstate Commerce" power granted to the federal Government by the Supreme Court. ERISA, enacted in 1974, relied on the "Interstate Commerce" rule to allow federal jurisdiction over private employers, based on the need of private employers to follow a single set of paperwork and rules for pensions and other employee benefit plans where employers had employees in multiple states. Except for private employer plans, insurance can be regulated by the individual states, and Managed Care entities making medical decisions can be held accountable for those decisions if negligence is involved, as allowed by the Texas Healthcare Liability Act.

== CIGNA Healthcare of Texas v. Calad ==
CIGNA Healthcare of Texas v. Calad
- Supreme Court of the United States

Argued March 23, 2004 Decided June 21, 2004
- Full case name: CIGNA HealthCare of Texas, Inc., dba CIGNA Corporation, Petitioner v. Ruby R. Calad, et al.
- Docket no.: 03-83

Court membership
- Chief Justice William Rehnquist Associate Justices John P. Stevens · Sandra Day O'Connor; Antonin Scalia · Anthony Kennedy; David Souter · Clarence Thomas; Ruth Bader Ginsburg · Stephen Breyer

CIGNA v. Calad was a Supreme Court of the United States appeal and ruling, where CIGNA Healthcare, Inc. challenged a United States Court of Appeals for the Fifth Circuit ruling in favor of Mrs. Ruby Calad, who was insured under her husband's employer's self-funded medical insurance plan in the State of Texas. This was a landmark Supreme Court case.

The facts established and in the record for purposes of the Supreme Court decision were that Mrs. Calad had undergone a hysterectomy at a CIGNA-approved Hospital, and as Administrator of Mr. Calad's employer's health plan, a CIGNA nurse had preapproved 1-night hospital stay for the procedure. Mrs. Calad was discharged home the day following the surgery, despite the fact that the surgeon who performed the surgery felt that Mrs. Calad needed more time in the hospital to convalesce from the surgery. Mrs. Calad, following discharge, experienced post-surgery complications, for which she had to be emergently readmitted to the hospital. Ms. Calad had sued CIGNA for damages. The District Court Judge (where ERISA cases must be tried) had ruled against Calad based on the Judge-made-law of ERISA, being beholden to Higher Court Decisions, awarding no monetary damages, as monetary damages are not one of the 3 so-called "Equitable Remedies" allowed by ERISA for redress for loss resulting from medical-related negligence when the insurance is underwritten in some way by a private employer, as was the plan of Mr. Calad.

Mr. Calad's company medical plan was funded by his private employer but "Administered" by CIGNA, in an "HMO"-type option, which was, on its face, one of the most advantageous of several plans offered by Mr. Calad's employer, with the lowest monthly premiums and the lowest co-pays for medical services.

Mrs. Calad appealed the US District Court ruling to the United States Court of Appeals for the Fifth Circuit, who heard the case and overturned the lower court's ruling and remanded the case back to the Texas State Court for trial, where it could be tried in light of the US Appellate Court ruling and interpretation, and a judge or jury would be allowed to determine "collateral damages," i.e. monetary award, relief that may be sought in a court of law but not in a court of equity.

The decision to remand had been informed by the fact that Texas had just enacted a law allowing 3rd-party review of managed care decisions to determine whether the decision had been negligent, and also an analysis by the 5th Circuit Court of recent Supreme Court ERISA-related rulings that dated back to a landmark Supreme Court ERISA ruling in the case of Pilot Life Ins. Co. v. Dedeaux, 481 U.S. 41 (1987).

Because of their similarity, both the CIGNA and the Aetna appeals were argued before the Supreme Court together, addressing the reach of Pilot Life on HMOs, with the 5th Circuit Court possibly having reversed prior ERISA-related US Supreme Court decisions. Making arguments before the Court included lawyers for CIGNA and Aetna, a lawyer arguing on behalf of the State of Texas, and some "Friend of the Court" arguments.

== Opinion of the Court ==
The Court ruled that Mr. Davila's and Ms. Calad's (the Respondents') state of Texas Causes of Action, both involving Utilization Review decisions by Managed Care entities (in this case CIGNA and Aetna) that were alleged to adversely affect patient care, where in both cases Utilization review decisions contradicted the advice of the Respondents' personal physicians), fell within ERISA § 502(a)(1)(B) (29 U.S.C. § 1132(a)(1)(B)). The Court therefore ruled these complaints were completely preempted by ERISA § 502 and Removable to the Federal District Court, therefore giving the Federal Court Jurisdiction over the resolution of the Complaints and defining ERISA as the law to be followed, superseding the applicable Texas statute (the THCLA). Consequently, the limited so-called "equitable remedies" available under ERISA § 502 must be the exclusive remedies available to redress damage alleged to be suffered as a result of these Managed Care Utilization Review decisions.

The Supreme Court reversed a decision of the U.S. Court of Appeals for the 5th Circuit that ERISA did not preempt state causes of action and that the case could be remanded to the Texas State Court to be tried there under Texas law.

== Analysis ==
The ruling was informed largely by ERISA judicial precedent (judge-made, or common law), as established early in ERISA's judicial history, especially Pilot Life v. Dedeaux. In the latter case, the language of ERISA and other evidence of congressional intent, including ERISA's legislative history; the expansive interpretation of ERISA's preemption clause (i.e. ERISA supersedes state laws that "relate to" private employer-sponsored benefit plans, with no specific guidance in the wording of the clause as to how Congress intended "relate to" to be interpreted); coupled with ERISA's enforcement scheme, which includes equitable remedies but not legal remedies, led to the conclusion that state law causes of action for legal remedies under Mississippi common law for bad faith denial of insurance claims, including compensatory and punitive damages, were not allowed by ERISA.

As Pilot Life challenged a disability insurance claim denial, the equitable remedies that are provided by ERISA might still have been available to Mr. Dedeaux despite this ruling, as ERISA provides several equitable injunctive remedies to challenge denials of benefit claims, such as mandating that the wrongfully denied benefit be provided.

The biggest distinguishing factor from Pilot Life in the case of "CIGNA v. Calad" was that it was too late for ERISA's powerful injunctive remedies to benefit the Respondents, who had already suffered damages for which equitable relief could not compensate them for their loss or suffering.

Essentially, this Supreme Court decision placed the Respondents' complaints in the status known as "Failure to state a claim upon which relief could be granted" and had to be dismissed on their faces. The facts of the case were never elucidated either by discovery or trial, but the cases were dismissed by motion, as a matter of law, whereby, even examining the facts in the most favorable light in favor of the Respondents, the relief they were seeking could not be granted.

As an example, if the Utilization review nurse had negligently applied the discharge protocol for hemorrhoidectomy rather than Total Abdominal Hysterectomy, and if Calad had died from complications resulting from the treatment decision to treat her on an outpatient basis with discharge instructions after only 1 day of hospitalization, the case would still have had to be dismissed; the law does not recognize monetary damages for negligent actions in Managed Care "administration" of Employer Medical Benefit Plans but does acknowledge that state malpractice laws do apply to treating physicians deciding or administrating the course of a patient's care.

CIGNA and Aetna both pointed out in oral arguments what has been referred to in ERISA's judicial history as the "panoply" of remedies that Calad and Davila might have evoked under ERISA to prevent the damage suffered, to include appeals of the adverse decisions, judicial injunction to compel Utilization Review to approve treatment, and a new Texas law that allowed for independent arbitration over Managed Care Utilization Review decisions based on Medical necessity.

Under the concepts of torts under Anglo-American Common Law, these points might best be described as a defense of contributory negligence. In other words, Ms. Calad and Mr. Davila might have prevented the damage to their person for which they are allowed no monetary damages in court if they had properly enforced their ERISA or THCLA rights against CIGNA and Aetna to prevent the injury from happening. The fact that ERISA had failed to prevent the harm, however, and the fact that it was ruled by the Supreme Court that neither CIGNA nor Aetna could owe monetary damages for their contribution to the harm done, shows that there is a need for change, either in ERISA itself by Congress or by the Supreme Court common law.

== Legacy ==
As in Miranda v. Arizona, which involves a similar Fifth Amendment constitutional question of being deprived of life, liberty, or property without due process of law, "affording the opportunity" for appeal might be enforced not only by the existence of such statutory rights but by ensuring that the patients are informed of those rights and are given a reasonable opportunity to invoke them.

The ERISA claims procedure regulations, detailed by the Secretary of Labor, require written notice for any "Adverse Determination" such as a Utilization review decision not to extend an approved course of treatment, and must provide a reasonable opportunity for a claimant or a representative (in Calad's case, her treating physician) an opportunity to appeal the decision in a timeframe appropriate to the urgency of the situation—in Calad's case, prior to her discharge. These regulations also require that the claims procedure not "contain any provision, and are not administered in a way, that unduly inhibits or hampers the initiation or processing of claims for benefits; a provision or practice that requires payment of a fee or costs as a condition to making a claim or to appealing an adverse benefit determination would be considered to unduly inhibit the initiation and processing of claims for benefits." For example, requiring a patient to agree to pay for a potentially costly medical treatment up front out of pocket to preserve the right to challenge the adverse determination later in court, with no guarantee that the challenge would be successful, and with a high risk of incurring expensive legal costs as well, would be considered "hampering the initiation or processing of claims for benefits", for obvious reasons.

Unfortunately, the claims procedure laws are not always followed, in part because the only recourse set forth by these laws for failure to provide such an appeal process is the right for the patient to consider the appeals process to be exhausted and bring a civil action under ERISA. Such an action might in theory be applied for patients like Calad if the patient had a lawyer prepared to file an emergency ex parte motion for a temporary restraining order in US District Court, perhaps even by phone to a magistrate, to compel the Utilization review nurse to approve treatment to protect the patient from imminent danger to life or health that might occur from discharging the patient against medical advice.

As lower Courts are bound by the precedents of higher Courts, as is the Supreme Court bound in large part to its own precedents, there has been great frustrations by the Courts in lawsuits brought by plaintiffs who under state common law would be entitled to monetary relief for damages or death suffered as a result of Utilization review nurses breaching a duty of care or the laws of the practice of medicine by prescribing the treatment plan for a diagnosis, as in Calad's case, as complex as "status post total abdominal hysterectomy with vaginal, bladder, and bowel repair", presumptively, before the surgery is even performed, as 1 day of inpatient care with 8 weeks of outpatient care, on the basis of a discharge protocol to be followed that hinges not on the clinical judgment of the physician who performed the surgery but the single question, "were there any complications of the procedure?"

This frustration was well stated by Justice Becker of the US Court of Appeals for the Third Circuit in his concurring opinion in Defelice v. Aetna, et al., a frustration succinctly summarized in his quote from a previous decision in Andrews-Clarke v. Travelers Ins. Co., (a complaint by a widow for the death of her husband as a consequence of a Managed Care Utilization review decision that cut short her husband's physician's recommended in-hospital treatment plan) as follows:

Under traditional notions of justice, the harms alleged—if true—should entitle [plaintiff] to some legal remedy on behalf of herself and her children against Travelers and Greenspring. Consider just one of her claims—breach of contract. This cause of action—that contractual promises can be enforced in the courts—pre-dates Magna Carta. It is the very bedrock of our notion of individual autonomy and property rights. It was among the first precepts of the common law to be recognized in the courts of the Commonwealth and has been zealously guarded by the state judiciary from that day to this. Our entire capitalist structure depends on it.

Nevertheless, this Court had no choice but to pluck [plaintiff's] case out of the state court in which she sought redress (and where relief to other litigants is available) and then, at the behest of Travelers and Greenspring, to slam the courthouse doors in her face and leave her without any remedy.

Also, Supreme Court Justice Ginsburg, in her concurring opinion in Aetna and CIGNA, et al. in which Justice Breyer joined, expressed the sentiments held by many that either Congress or the Courts revisit the law as currently enforced by statute and precedent:

The Court today holds that the claims respondents asserted under Texas law are totally preempted by §502(a) of the Employee Retirement Income Security Act of 1974 (ERISA or Act), 29 U. S. C. §1132(a). That decision is consistent with our governing case law on ERISA's preemptive scope. I therefore join the Court's opinion. But, with greater enthusiasm, as indicated by my dissenting opinion in Great-West Life & Annuity Ins. Co. v. Knudson, 534 U. S. 204 (2002), I also join "the rising judicial chorus urging that Congress and this Court revisit what is an unjust and increasingly tangled ERISA regime."
