= Pennsylvania State Police v. Suders =

- Supreme Court of the United States

Argued Mar 31, 2004 Decided June 14, 2004
- Full case name: Pennsylvania State Police v. Suders
- Docket no.: 03-95
- Citations: 542 U.S. 129 (more) 124 S. Ct. 2342, 159 L. Ed. 2d 204
- Argument: Oral argument
- Opinion announcement: Opinion announcement

Case history
- Prior: 325 F.3d 432 (2003)

Holding
- An employer may be liable for a Title VII violation under a constructive discharge theory. However, the plaintiff who quit based on harassment must prove that they quit because conditions were objectively unbearable. If the plaintiff cannot do so, the employer may try to employ the Ellerth/Faragher affirmative defense.

Court membership
- Chief Justice William Rehnquist Associate Justices John P. Stevens · Sandra Day O'Connor; Antonin Scalia · Anthony Kennedy; David Souter · Clarence Thomas; Ruth Bader Ginsburg · Stephen Breyer

Case opinions
- Majority: Ginsburg, joined by Rehnquist, Stevens, O’Connor, Scalia, Kennedy, Souter, Breyer
- Dissent: Thomas

Pennsylvania State Police v. Suders, 542 U.S. 129 (2004), was a United States Supreme Court case in which the court held that an employer may be liable for a Title VII violation under a constructive discharge theory. However, the plaintiff who quit based on harassment must prove that they quit because conditions for any reasonable person would be unbearable. If they cannot do so, the employer may try to employ an affirmative defense based on earlier cases, Burlington Industries, Inc. v. Ellerth and Faragher v. Boca Raton.

== Background ==
In March 1998, the Pennsylvania State Police (PSP) hired Suders to work as a police communications operator for the McConnellsburg barracks, where her male supervisors subjected her to a continuous barrage of sexual harassment. In June 1998, Suders told the PSP's Equal Employment Opportunity Officer, Virginia Smith-Elliott, that she might need help, but neither woman followed up on the conversation. Two months later, Suders contacted Smith-Elliott again, this time reporting that she was being harassed and was afraid. Smith-Elliott told Suders to file a complaint, but did not tell her how to obtain the necessary form. Two days later, Suders' supervisors arrested her for theft of her own computer-skills exam papers. Suders had removed the papers after concluding that the supervisors had falsely reported that she had repeatedly failed, when in fact, the exams were never forwarded for grading. Suders then resigned from the force and sued the PSP, alleging, among other things, that she had been subjected to sexual harassment and constructively discharged, in violation of Title VII of the Civil Rights Act of 1964.

The United States District Court granted the PSP's motion for summary judgment. Although recognizing that Suders' testimony would permit a finder-of-fact to conclude that her supervisors had created a hostile work environment, the court nevertheless held that the PSP was not vicariously liable for the supervisors' conduct. In support of its decision, the District Court referred to Faragher v. Boca Raton. In that case and in Burlington Industries, Inc. v. Ellerth, the Supreme Court held that an employer is strictly liable for supervisor harassment that "culminates in a tangible employment action, such as discharge, demotion, or undesirable reassignment." But when no such tangible action is taken, both decisions also hold, the employer may raise an affirmative defense to liability. To prevail on the basis of the defense, the employer must prove that "(a) [it] exercised reasonable care to prevent and correct promptly any sexually harassing behavior," and that (b) the employee "unreasonably failed to take advantage of any preventive or corrective opportunities provided by the employer or to avoid harm otherwise." Suders's hostile work environment claim was untenable as a matter of law, the District Court stated, because she unreasonably failed to avail herself of the PSP's internal antiharassment procedures. The court did not address Suders's constructive discharge claim.

The Third Circuit Court of Appeals reversed and remanded the case for trial. The appeals court disagreed with the District Court in two key respects: First, even if the PSP could assert the Ellerth/Faragher affirmative defense, genuine issues of material fact existed about the effectiveness of the PSP's program to address sexual harassment claims; second, Suders had stated a claim of constructive discharge due to hostile work environment. The appeals court ruled that a constructive discharge, if proved, constitutes a tangible employment action that renders an employer strictly liable and precludes recourse to the Ellerth/Faragher affirmative defense.

== Opinion of the court ==
The Supreme Court issued an opinion on June 14, 2004.

According to the majority opinion by Justice Ginsburg, harassment so intolerable as to cause a resignation may be effected through co-worker conduct, unofficial supervisory conduct, or official company acts. However, unlike an actual termination, a constructive discharge may or may not involve official action. When a constructive discharge does involve official action, the extent to which the agency relationship aided the supervisor's misconduct is less certain. Because of that uncertainty, the employer must have a chance to establish, through the Ellerth/Faragher affirmative defense, that it should not be held vicariously liable. Ginsburg said the Third Circuit erred in drawing the line differently.
