= List of United States Supreme Court cases, volume 540 =

This is a list of all the United States Supreme Court cases from volume 540 of the United States Reports:

Case name	Citation	Date decided
Yarborough v. Gentry	540 U.S. 1	2003
Mitchell v. Esparza	540 U.S. 12	2003
Barnhart v. Thomas	540 U.S. 20	2003
The Social Security Administration's determination that it can find a claimant not disabled where she remains physically and mentally able to do her previous work, without investigating whether that work exists in significant numbers in the national economy, is a reasonable statutory interpretation that is entitled to Chevron deference.
United States v. Banks	540 U.S. 31	2003
Raytheon Co. v. Hernandez	540 U.S. 44	2003
Virginia v. Maryland	540 U.S. 56	2003
McConnell v. FEC	540 U.S. 93	2003
Maryland v. Pringle	540 U.S. 366	2003
Castro v. United States	540 U.S. 375	2003
SEC v. Edwards	540 U.S. 389	2004
Verizon v. Trinko	540 U.S. 398	2004
Illinois v. Lidster	540 U.S. 419	2004
Frew v. Hawkins	540 U.S. 431	2004
Kontrick v. Ryan	540 U.S. 443	2004
Alaska Dept. of Environmental Conservation v. EPA	540 U.S. 461	2004
Fellers v. United States	540 U.S. 519	2004
Lamie v. U.S. Trustee	540 U.S. 526	2004
Illinois v. Fisher	540 U.S. 544	2004
Groh v. Ramirez	540 U.S. 551	2004
Gen. Dynamics Land Systems, Inc. v. Cline	540 U.S. 581	2004
Doe v. Chao	540 U.S. 614	2004
Olympic Airways v. Husain	540 U.S. 644	2004
Banks v. Dretke	540 U.S. 668	2004
Locke v. Davey	540 U.S. 712	2004
Postal Service v. Flamingo Industries (USA) Ltd.	540 U.S. 736	2004
Muhammad v. Close	540 U.S. 749	2004
