= Groh v. Ramirez =

- Supreme Court of the United States

Decided February 24, 2004
- Full case name: Groh v. Ramirez
- Citations: 540 U.S. 551 (more)

Holding
- A search warrant that does not state the items to be seized is unreasonable by default, and the officer is not entitled to qualified immunity for executing such a warrant.

Court membership
- Chief Justice William Rehnquist Associate Justices John P. Stevens · Sandra Day O'Connor; Antonin Scalia · Anthony Kennedy; David Souter · Clarence Thomas; Ruth Bader Ginsburg · Stephen Breyer

Case opinions
- Majority: Stevens
- Dissent: Kennedy, joined by Rehnquist
- Dissent: Thomas, joined by Scalia; Rehnquist (Part III only)

Groh v. Ramirez, 540 U.S. 551 (2004), was a United States Supreme Court case in which the court held that a search warrant that does not state the items to be seized is unreasonable by default, and the officer is not entitled to qualified immunity for executing such a warrant.

== Background ==
Jeff Groh, a Bureau of Alcohol, Tobacco and Firearms agent, prepared and signed an application for a warrant to search a Montana ranch owned by Joseph R. Ramirez for specified weapons, explosives, and records. The application was supported by Groh's detailed affidavit setting forth his basis for believing that such items were on the ranch and was accompanied by a warrant form that he completed. However, the warrant that was signed by a judge did not identify any of the items that petitioner intended to seize. The portion of the warrant calling for a description of the "person or property" described Ramirez's house, not the alleged weapons; the warrant did not incorporate by reference the application’s itemized list. Groh led federal and local law enforcement officers to the ranch the next day but found no illegal weapons or explosives. Groh left a copy of the warrant, but not the application, with Ramirez. Ramirez sued Groh and others under Bivens v. Six Unknown Fed. Narcotics Agents and Section 1983, claiming a Fourth Amendment violation. The district court granted the defendants summary judgment, finding no Fourth Amendment violation, and finding that even if such a violation occurred, the defendants were entitled to qualified immunity. The Ninth Circuit affirmed except as to the Fourth Amendment claim against petitioner, holding that the warrant was invalid because it did not describe with particularity the place to be searched and the items to be seized. The court also concluded that United States v. Leon precluded qualified immunity for petitioner because he was the leader of a search who did not read the warrant and satisfy himself that he understood its scope and limitations and that it was not obviously defective.
