= Till v. SCS Credit Corp. =

- Supreme Court of the United States

Argued December 2, 2003 Decided May 17, 2004
- Full case name: Till et ux. v. SCS Credit Corp.
- Citations: 541 U.S. 465 (more) 124 S. Ct. 1951; 158 L. Ed. 2d 787; 2004 U.S. LEXIS 3385

Court membership
- Chief Justice William Rehnquist Associate Justices John P. Stevens · Sandra Day O'Connor; Antonin Scalia · Anthony Kennedy; David Souter · Clarence Thomas; Ruth Bader Ginsburg · Stephen Breyer

Case opinions
- Plurality: Stevens, joined by Souter, Ginsburg, Breyer
- Concurrence: Thomas (in judgment)
- Dissent: Scalia, joined by Rehnquist, O'Connor, Kennedy

Till v. SCS Credit Corp., 541 U.S. 465 (2004), was a decision by the United States Supreme Court regarding a cramdown in the value of a loan during a Chapter 13 bankruptcy.

The "decision that had no majority opinion, four justices held that the proper rate was the 9.5 percent one arrived at by modifying the average national loan rate to make up for the increased risk of non-payment. While this would not give the creditors the same amount of money that they might have gotten had they seized the collateral for the loan, it nevertheless met the statutory requirement that the repayments equal the "total present value." Justice Clarence Thomas, in a separate opinion that provided the fifth vote needed for judgment, found that the 9.5 percent rate was acceptable, but that it could be even lower because the Bankruptcy Code did not require the judge to accommodate for the risk of non-payment."

== See also ==
- List of United States Supreme Court cases, volume 541
- List of United States Supreme Court cases
