= Nixon v. Missouri Municipal League =

- Supreme Court of the United States

Argued January 12, 2004 Decided March 24, 2004
- Full case name: Nixon, Attorney General of Missouri v. Missouri Municipal League et al.
- Docket no.: 02-1238
- Citations: 541 U.S. 125 (more)

Holding
- States may regulate telecommunication services provided by municipal governments without running afoul of the Telecommunications Act of 1996.

Court membership
- Chief Justice William Rehnquist Associate Justices John P. Stevens · Sandra Day O'Connor; Antonin Scalia · Anthony Kennedy; David Souter · Clarence Thomas; Ruth Bader Ginsburg · Stephen Breyer

Case opinions
- Majority: Souter, joined by Rehnquist, O'Connor, Kennedy, Ginsburg, Breyer
- Concurrence: Scalia, joined by Thomas
- Dissent: Stevens

Laws applied
- Section 253(a) of the Telecommunications Act of 1996

Nixon v. Missouri Municipal League, 541 U.S. 125 (2004), is a U.S. Supreme Court case decided on March 24, 2004. The case concerned the Federal Communications Commission’s ability to preempt state law under § 253(a) of the Telecommunications Act of 1996.

== Facts ==
In 1997, the Missouri state legislature enacted § 392.410(7) of the State's Revised Statutes, which prohibited the sale of telecommunications service by any political subdivisions of the state. The Missouri Municipal League, which consisted of municipalities, municipal organizations, and municipally-owned utilities, petitioned the Federal Communications Commission for an order declaring the state statute unlawful and requesting the Commission to preempt under § 253(a) of the Telecommunications Act (47 U.S.C, § 253(a)), which provides that “No State or local statute or regulation, or other State or local legal requirement, may prohibit or have the effect of prohibiting the ability of any entity to provide any interstate or intrastate telecommunications service.” After notice and comment, the FCC refused to declare the Missouri statute preempted. The United States Court of Appeals for the Eighth Circuit reversed this decision, finding that the term “entity” in the statute, especially when modified by “any,” manifested sufficiently clear congressional intent to include governmental entities within its scope. This decision created a circuit split between the Eighth Circuit and the United States Court of Appeals for the District of Columbia Circuit's City of Abilene, Texas v. FCC, 164 F. 3d 49 (1999) opinion, which held that a state statute prohibiting municipalities from directly or indirectly selling telecommunications services to the public was not preempted by the same provision, and the Supreme Court granted certiorari to resolve the conflict.

== Judgment ==
In an 8-1 opinion authored by Justice David Souter, the Supreme Court reversed the Eighth Circuit’s order and upheld the Missouri statute. In their analysis of the Telecommunications Act’s grant of authority to the FCC to preempt state laws, the Court concluded that “the class of entities contemplated by § 253 does not include the State's own subdivisions, so as to affect the power of States and localities to restrict their own (or their political inferiors') delivery of telecommunications services.” This holding followed the reasoning from the 1999 D.C. Circuit decision in City of Abilene, Tex. v. F.C.C. The Court reasoned that the term "any entity" in § 253(a) does not plainly include municipalities. The majority opinion interpreted the Supremacy Clause to mean that Congress may legislate in areas traditionally regulated by the states, but that Congress would not exercise this power lightly, and not without a clear grant of authority. The standard for determining whether Congress truly intended to alter the balance between federal and state powers is a directive that is "unmistakably clear in the language of the statute." The Court found no such explicit language in the provision. The Court based their reasoning in part on the inseparable nature of states and their political subdivisions, which rely on states for their existence and any authority. The Court reasoned that in the absence of some authorizing legislation by a state, municipalities would still be powerless to enter the telecommunications business, thus “any entity” could not mean municipalities because they did not have “the ability” without state authorization. Justice Stevens dissented, arguing that Congress was aware of the existence of publicly owned utilities when the Telecommunications Act was enacted and intended to include them as entities, and that the FCC's interference into state-local affairs was limited because the agency could pre-empt only those state laws that constitute nonneutral restraints on telecommunications providers.
