= Intel Corp. v. Advanced Micro Devices, Inc. =

- Supreme Court of the United States

Argued April 20, 2004 Decided June 21, 2004
- Full case name: Intel Corporation, Petitioner v. Advanced Micro Devices, Incorporated
- Citations: 542 U.S. 241 (more) 124 S. Ct. 2466; 159 L. Ed. 2d 355; 2004 U.S. LEXIS 4570; 72 U.S.L.W. 4528; 71 U.S.P.Q.2d (BNA) 1001; 2004-1 Trade Cas. (CCH) ¶ 74,453; 64 Fed. R. Evid. Serv. (Callaghan) 742; 58 Fed. R. Serv. 3d (Callaghan) 696; 17 Fla. L. Weekly Fed. S 399

Case history
- Prior: On writ of certiorari to the United States Court of Appeals for the Ninth Circuit. Advanced Micro Devices, Inc. v. Intel Corp., 292 F.3d 664, 2002 U.S. App. LEXIS 10759 (9th Cir. 2002)
- Subsequent: Application denied by Advanced Micro Devices, Inc. v. Intel Corp., 2004 U.S. Dist. LEXIS 21437 (N.D. Cal., Oct. 4, 2004)

Holding
- Section 1782 "authorizes, but does not require, the District Court to provide discovery aid to AMD."

Court membership
- Chief Justice William Rehnquist Associate Justices John P. Stevens · Sandra Day O'Connor; Antonin Scalia · Anthony Kennedy; David Souter · Clarence Thomas; Ruth Bader Ginsburg · Stephen Breyer

Case opinions
- Majority: Ginsburg, joined by Rehnquist, Stevens, Kennedy, Souter, Thomas
- Concurrence: Scalia
- Dissent: Breyer
- O'Connor took no part in the consideration or decision of the case.

Laws applied
- 28 U.S.C. § 1782

Intel Corp. v. Advanced Micro Devices, Inc., 542 U.S. 241 (2004), is a decision by the Supreme Court of the United States involving 28 U.S.C. § 1782, which authorizes United States district courts to enforce discovery requests made in connection with litigation being conducted in foreign tribunals. Prior to Intel, there had been substantial disagreement as to the availability of Section 1782 discovery.

The Intel case originated from Advanced Micro Devices' antitrust claims against Intel in Europe. AMD filed a complaint against Intel in the European Union's antitrust enforcement agency (the Directorate-General for Competition), and then filed a lawsuit in the U.S. for discovery of certain Intel documents in order to further their complaint.

== See also ==
- List of United States Supreme Court cases, volume 542
- List of United States Supreme Court cases
