= Hibbs v. Winn =

- Supreme Court of the United States

Decided June 14, 2004
- Full case name: Hibbs v. Winn
- Citations: 542 U.S. 88 (more)

Holding
- The Tax Injunction Act does not prevent a person from bringing a prospective challenge to the constitutionality of a tax credit assessed for other people.

Court membership
- Chief Justice William Rehnquist Associate Justices John P. Stevens · Sandra Day O'Connor; Antonin Scalia · Anthony Kennedy; David Souter · Clarence Thomas; Ruth Bader Ginsburg · Stephen Breyer

Case opinions
- Majority: Ginsburg, joined by Stevens, O'Connor, Souter, Breyer
- Concurrence: Stevens
- Dissent: Kennedy, joined by Rehnquist, Scalia, Thomas

Laws applied
- Tax Injunction Act

Hibbs v. Winn, 542 U.S. 88 (2004), was a United States Supreme Court case in which the court held that the Tax Injunction Act does not prevent a person from bringing a prospective challenge to the constitutionality of a tax credit assessed for other people.

== Background ==
A group of Arizona taxpayers filed suit in federal district court against the Director of the Arizona Department of Revenue (Director) seeking to enjoin the operation of Ariz. Rev. Stat. Ann. §43–1089 on Establishment Clause grounds. Arizona's law authorizes an income-tax credit for payments to nonprofit "school tuition organizations" (STOs) that awards scholarships to students in private elementary or secondary schools. Section 43–1089 provides that STOs may not designate schools that "discriminate on the basis of race, color, handicap, familial status or national origin," §43–1089(F), but does not preclude STOs from designating schools that provide religious instruction or give religion-based admissions preferences. The federal District Court granted the Director's motion to dismiss on the ground that the Tax Injunction Act (TIA), 28 U. S. C. §1341, barred the suit. The TIA prohibits lower federal courts from restraining "the assessment, levy or collection of any tax under State law where a plain, speedy and efficient remedy may be had in the courts of such State." The Ninth Circuit Court of Appeals reversed, holding that the TIA does not bar federal-court actions challenging state tax credits.

The Supreme Court granted certiorari.

== Opinion of the court ==
The Supreme Court issued an opinion on June 14, 2004.

== Later developments ==
The court also made a jurisdictional decision that prompted a change to Supreme Court Rule 13.3. The rule was changed to say that the time to file the petition for a writ of certiorari for all parties can run from the date that "the lower court appropriately entertains an untimely petition for rehearing or sua sponte considers rehearing".
