= United States v. Patane =

- Supreme Court of the United States

Argued December 9, 2003 Decided June 28, 2004
- Full case name: United States v. Samuel Francis Patane
- Docket no.: 02-1183
- Citations: 542 U.S. 630 (more) 124 S. Ct. 2620; 159 L. Ed. 2d 667; 2004 U.S. LEXIS 4577; 72 U.S.L.W. 4643; 2004 Fla. L. Weekly Fed. S 482
- Argument: Oral argument

Case history
- Prior: On writ of certiorari to the U.S. Court of Appeal for the Tenth Circuit

Holding
- Physical evidence obtained from un-Mirandized statements, as long as those statements were not forced by police, are constitutionally admissible, although the actual statements may not be.

Court membership
- Chief Justice William Rehnquist Associate Justices John P. Stevens · Sandra Day O'Connor; Antonin Scalia · Anthony Kennedy; David Souter · Clarence Thomas; Ruth Bader Ginsburg · Stephen Breyer

Case opinions
- Plurality: Thomas, joined by Rehnquist, Scalia
- Concurrence: Kennedy (in judgment), joined by O'Connor
- Dissent: Souter, joined by Stevens, Ginsburg
- Dissent: Breyer

Laws applied
- U.S. Const. amend. V

United States v. Patane, 542 U.S. 630 (2004), was a United States Supreme Court case relating to Miranda warnings.

== Background ==
Samuel Patane was arrested in front of his home for calling his ex-girlfriend in violation of a restraining order. During the arrest, police officers began reading Patane his Miranda rights. Patane told the officers that he already knew his rights, at which point the officers then stopped reading them. Detective Benner asked Patane about a pistol and Patane told him that he had a gun in his house. The police searched Patane's house with his permission and found the gun. As a felon, Patane was not permitted to possess a gun and was prosecuted for possession.

During the trial on gun possession charges, Patane argued that his arrest violated the Fourth Amendment prohibition of unreasonable searches and seizures and the Fifth Amendment right not to incriminate oneself because there was not probable cause to arrest him and because the gun had been found as a result of an un-Mirandized confession.

The district court initially ruled and adjudged that there was not probable cause for his arrest and that it was therefore unconstitutional. A Tenth Circuit Court of Appeals panel disagreed, holding that Patane's ex-girlfriend had given police probable cause for the arrest. However, the panel held that the gun could not be used as evidence because it had been found as the result of an un-Mirandized (and therefore unconstitutional) confession. The government appealed, arguing that physical evidence found as the result of un-Mirandized testimony could be used in court, despite the fact that the testimony itself was inadmissible.

== Issue ==
Whether a failure to give a suspect the warnings prescribed in Miranda v. Arizona requires the suppression of physical evidence derived from the suspect's unwarned but voluntary statement.

== Holding ==
In a decision without a majority opinion, three justices wrote that the Miranda warnings were merely intended to prevent violations of the Constitution, and that because Patane's un-Mirandized testimony was not admitted at trial, the Constitution (specifically the Fifth Amendment's protection against self-incrimination) had not been violated. Physical evidence obtained from un-Mirandized statements, as long as those statements were not forced by police, were constitutionally admissible. Two other justices also held that the physical evidence was constitutionally admissible, but did so with the understanding that the Miranda warnings must be accommodated to other objectives of the criminal justice system. They did not discuss whether the Miranda warnings were, in themselves, constitutionally required.

== See also ==
- Miranda v. Arizona
- Miranda warning
- List of United States Supreme Court cases, volume 542
- List of United States Supreme Court cases
