= Cheney v. United States District Court =

- Supreme Court of the United States

Argued April 27, 2004 Decided June 24, 2004
- Full case name: Cheney, Vice President of the United States, et al. v. United States District Court for the District of Columbia, et al.
- Citations: 542 U.S. 367 (more) 124 S. Ct. 2576; 159 L. Ed. 2d 459

Case history
- Prior: In re Cheney, 334 F.3d 1096 (D.C. Cir. 2003); cert. granted, 540 U.S. 1088 (2003).
- Subsequent: In re Cheney, 406 F.3d 723 (D.C. Cir. 2005)

Holding
- Case sent back to U.S. Court of Appeals for the D.C. Circuit for review.

Court membership
- Chief Justice William Rehnquist Associate Justices John P. Stevens · Sandra Day O'Connor; Antonin Scalia · Anthony Kennedy; David Souter · Clarence Thomas; Ruth Bader Ginsburg · Stephen Breyer

Case opinions
- Majority: Kennedy, joined by Rehnquist, Stevens, O'Connor, Breyer; Scalia, Thomas (Parts I–IV)
- Concurrence: Stevens
- Concur/dissent: Thomas, joined by Scalia
- Dissent: Ginsburg, joined by Souter

Laws applied
- United States v. Nixon, Clinton v. Jones

Cheney v. United States District Court, 542 U.S. 367 (2004), was a 2004 United States Supreme Court case between Vice President Dick Cheney and the U.S. District Court for the District of Columbia. The case came as an appeal after the lower District Court for the District of Columbia ordered Cheney to disclose some of his records that would show how his National Energy Policy Development Group developed its recommendations. Cheney appealed the decision to the Court of Appeals for the DC Circuit, but the Appeals Court rejected the appeal. In a 7–2 decision, the Court sent the case back to the U.S. Court of Appeals for the D.C. Circuit.

== Prior history ==
The case began when the conservative Judicial Watch filed Freedom of Information Act requests about the National Energy Policy Development Group, which Cheney headed, in 2001–2002. These requests were denied.

Judicial Watch and the Sierra Club then sued, arguing the refusal a violation of the Federal Advisory Committee Act of 1972 (FACA), which requires committees set up by the president or by federal agencies to provide advice must conduct their business in public. The exception to this law is committees composed entirely of federal officials and employees, which de jure Cheney's committee was.

However, Judicial Watch and the Sierra Club argued that because so many energy industry lobbyists were so deeply involved in the committee's work, they were effectively members. Under this, the committee would have to obey FACA. In 1993, the D.C. Circuit ruled in Association of American Physicians and Surgeons v. Clinton, that in such a situation, FACA does apply.

In July 2002, D.C. district judge Emmet G. Sullivan ruled that Sierra Club and Judicial Watch deserved to know whether private citizens had taken part in the work of the task force to a large enough degree sufficient to bring the task force under the umbrella of the law.

Rather than accepting the ruling, the vice president appealed it to the Court of Appeals for the D.C. Circuit, arguing that complying would force him reveal information that, under law, he does not have to reveal. Cheney also argued that the order violated separation of powers principles.

The Court of Appeals ruled that Cheney did have to turn over information. Cheney appealed this decision to the Supreme Court.

== Case ==
The question the Court was debating was whether or not the D.C. District Court should have rejected the request from the Vice President to block disclosure of records from his energy policy task force.

The Court ruled 7–2 that the lower appeals court had acted "prematurely" and sent the case back to the court.

The Court did not rule on whether or not FACA should or should not apply to the task force, and left to the Court of Appeals.

Anthony Kennedy wrote the majority opinion, agreed to by four other justices. Two justices, Clarence Thomas and Scalia would have had the case end there with Cheney not having to disclose any information. Ruth Bader Ginsburg was joined by David H. Souter in dissenting, arguing the Supreme Court should let the case proceed in the District Court.

=== Scalia conflict of interest controversy ===
The case received press attention when Antonin Scalia refused to recuse himself from the case, despite having hunted ducks with Cheney and others while the case was pending in the lower courts. Scalia filed a lengthy statement explaining why he was not recusing himself. In the end, Scalia supported Cheney.

== Subsequent history ==
On May 9, 2005, the U.S. Court of Appeals for the District of Columbia ruled that the Vice President's Energy Task Force did not have to comply with the Federal Advisory Committee Act.

== See also ==
- List of United States Supreme Court cases, volume 542
- List of United States Supreme Court cases
