= United States v. Lara =

- Supreme Court of the United States

Argued January 21, 2004 Decided April 19, 2004
- Full case name: United States v. Billy Jo Lara
- Citations: 541 U.S. 193 (more) 124 S. Ct. 1628; 158 L. Ed. 2d 420; 2004 U.S. LEXIS 2738

Case history
- Prior: United States v. Lara, 2001 U.S. Dist. LEXIS 20182 (D.N.D. 2001). United States v. Lara, 294 F.3d 1004 (8th Cir. 2002). United States v. Lara, 324 F.3d 635 (8th Cir. 2003).

Holding
- As an Indian tribe and the United States are separate sovereigns, prosecuting a crime under both tribal and federal law does not attach double jeopardy.

Court membership
- Chief Justice William Rehnquist Associate Justices John P. Stevens · Sandra Day O'Connor; Antonin Scalia · Anthony Kennedy; David Souter · Clarence Thomas; Ruth Bader Ginsburg · Stephen Breyer

Case opinions
- Majority: Breyer, joined by Rehnquist, Stevens, O'Connor, Ginsburg
- Concurrence: Stevens
- Concurrence: Kennedy (in judgment)
- Concurrence: Thomas (in judgment)
- Dissent: Souter, joined by Scalia

Laws applied
- U.S. Const. Art. II, §2; U.S. Const. amend. V; 25 U.S.C. § 1301(2)

United States v. Lara, 541 U.S. 193 (2004), is a United States Supreme Court landmark case which held that both the United States and a Native American (Indian) tribe could prosecute an Indian for the same acts that constituted crimes in both jurisdictions. The court held that the United States and the tribe were separate sovereigns; therefore, separate tribal and federal prosecutions did not violate the Double Jeopardy Clause.

In the 1880s, Congress passed the Major Crimes Act, divesting tribes of criminal jurisdiction in regard to several felony crimes. In 1990, the Supreme Court ruled in Duro v. Reina that an Indian tribe did not have the authority to try an Indian criminally who was not a member of that tribe. The following year, Congress passed a law that stated that Indian tribes, because of their inherent sovereignty, had the authority to try non-member Indians for crimes committed within the tribe's territorial jurisdiction.

The defendant, Billy Jo Lara, was charged for acts that were criminal offenses under both the Spirit Lake Sioux Tribe's laws and the federal United States Code. Lara pleaded guilty to the tribal charges, but claimed double jeopardy against the federal charges. The Supreme Court ruled that double jeopardy did not apply to Lara since "the successive prosecutions were brought by separate and distinct sovereign bodies".

== Background ==
=== History ===
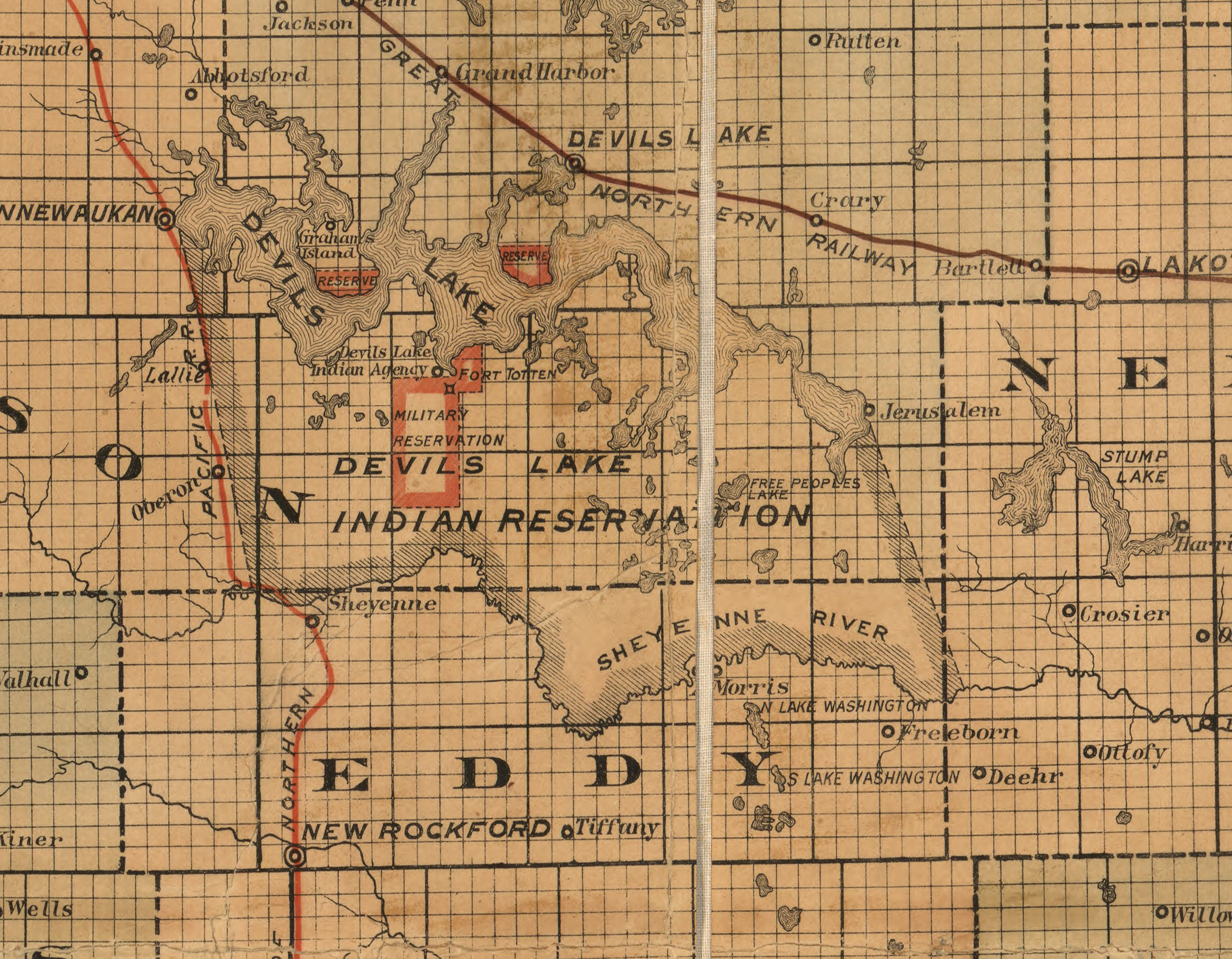
1892 Map of Spirit Lake Reservation, then known as Devil's Lake Reservation

The Sioux people consist of three main groups, the Lakota in the west, the Western Dakota in the center, and the Eastern Dakota in the east. (Note: The Lakota, also known as Teton Sioux, consist of the Brulé, Oglala, Sans Arc, Hunkpapa, Miniconjou, Sihasapa (or Blackfoot Sioux, not to be confused with the Blackfoot tribe), and the Two Kettles bands. This group speaks the Lakota dialect of the Sioux language. The Dakota, sometimes known as the Western Dakota, consist of the Yankton and Yanktonai bands, which speak the Western Dakota dialect of the Sioux language. The Santee, or Eastern Dakota, consist of the Mdewakantonwan, Wahpeton, Sisseton, and Wahpekute bands, speaking the Eastern Dakota dialect of the Sioux language.) In the east, the Santee was originally from the Minnesota area. The Chippewa or Ojibwe people were also from the same general area. The two tribes had been at war from at least 1736 and by 1750 the Chippewa had forced the Santee to the west into the prairie. The war between the tribes continued until at least the 1850s. Only after 1862, when the Santee rose up against the whites and were subsequently removed to the Dakota Territory, did the fighting cease. In 1872, the Sisseton and Wahpeton bands of the Santee signed a treaty that resulted in their moving to the Spirit Lake Reservation. (Note: The reservation was originally known as Devil's Lake Reservation.)

=== Major Crimes Act ===
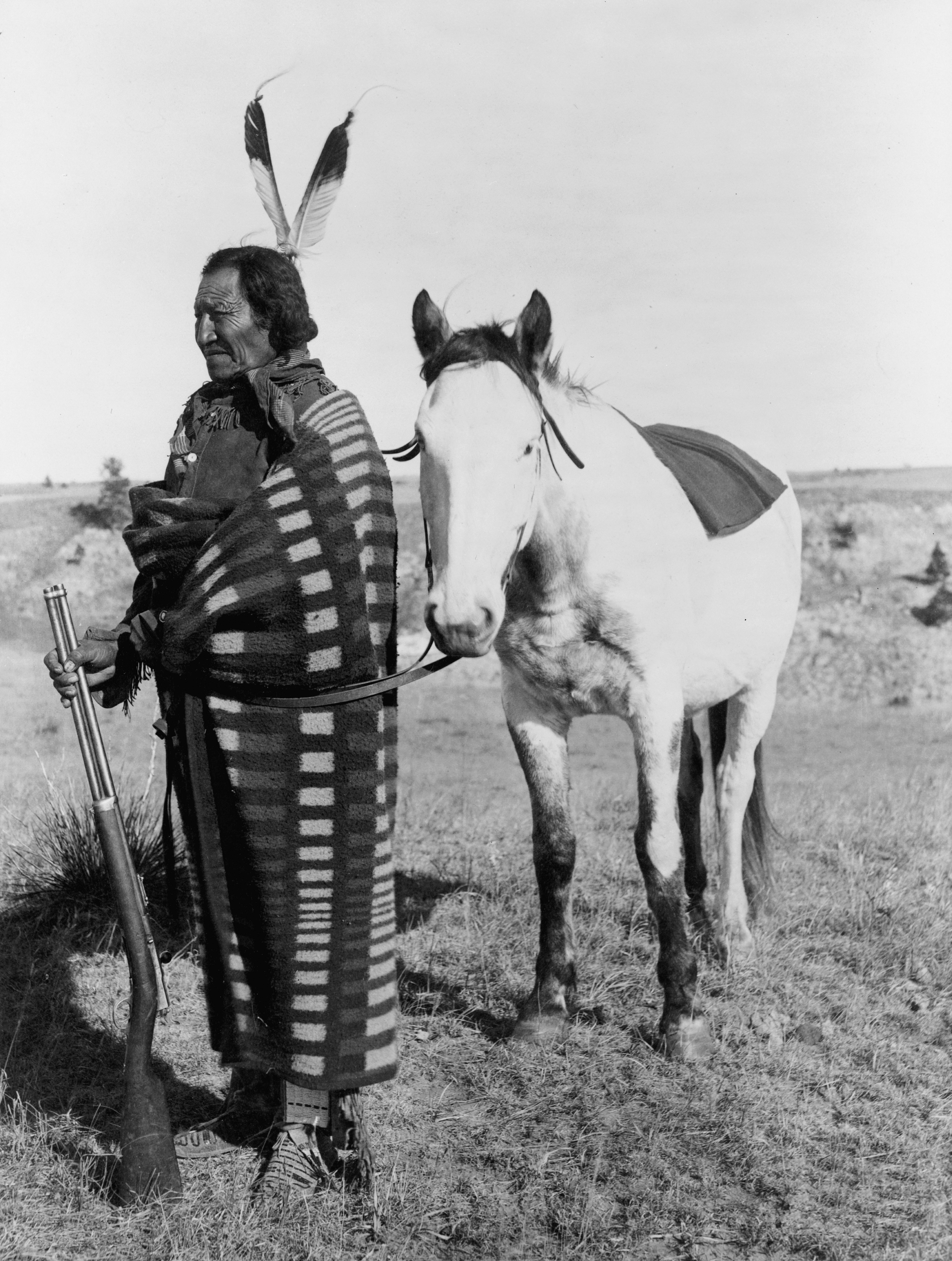
Crow Dog

Originally, crimes committed by Indians against Indians were not subject to federal or state jurisdiction, but were handled by tribal law. In 1881, a Brulé Lakota named Crow Dog shot and killed another Indian, Spotted Tail, on the Great Sioux Reservation in South Dakota. Crow Dog was tried in federal court for murder, found guilty, and sentenced to hang. He petitioned for a writ of habeas corpus to the Supreme Court, and in Ex parte Crow Dog the Supreme Court found that the federal government did not have jurisdiction to try the case. Crow Dog was ordered released, having made restitution under tribal law to Spotted Tail's family. (Note: The restitution consisted of $ 600 (or $ 50 in one source), eight ponies, and one blanket.)

In response to Ex Parte Crow Dog, Congress passed the Major Crimes Act in 1885. The Act provided that the federal government had exclusive jurisdiction (Note: The federal government has exclusive jurisdiction as regards the states, however, the Indian tribes retain concurrent jurisdiction for these offenses.) over certain Indian-on-Indian crimes (Note: The crimes covered were murder, manslaughter, rape, assault with intent to commit murder, arson, burglary, and larceny.) when the crimes were committed in "Indian country." (Note: Indian country was defined as all reservation land, all dependent Indian communities, and all Indian allotments.) In 1886, the Act was upheld by the Supreme Court in United States v. Kagama.

=== Duro v. Reina ===
In 1990, the Supreme Court held in Duro v. Reina that an Indian tribe did not have jurisdiction to try an Indian of another tribe. (Note: The Duro case involved the slaying of a 14-year-old on the reservation by an Indian of another tribe. The United States Attorney declined to prosecute, so the tribe prosecuted Duro for the tribal offense of discharging a weapon.) Tribal leaders urged Congress to fix the problem that the Duro decision created. In 1991, Congress amended the Indian Civil Rights Act (ICRA) to recognize that Indian tribes had inherent power to exercise criminal jurisdiction over all Indians. This legislation became known as the "Duro fix", and was based on tribal sovereignty rather than a federal delegation of power.

=== Arrest ===
Billy Jo Lara was an enrolled member of the Turtle Mountain Band of Chippewa Indians located in northern North Dakota near the Canada–U.S. border. The Spirit Lake Reservation is approximately 90 miles (140 km) south of the Turtle Mountain Indian Reservation. Lara had married a member of the Spirit Lake Santee tribe and had resided on the Spirit Lake Reservation with her and their children until he was banished from the reservation due to several serious misdemeanors. Lara returned to the reservation, where he was arrested and charged with public intoxication. After the arrest, Bureau of Indian Affairs (BIA) officer Bryon Swan took Lara to the police station where Lara was informed of a Sioux order excluding him from the reservation. Lara then struck Swan, who as a BIA officer was considered both a tribal officer and a federal law enforcement officer.

=== Procedural history ===
==== Trial courts ====
Following his arrest, the tribal court of the Spirit Lake Sioux Tribe charged Lara with assaulting the arresting officers, along with four other charges. (Note: Lara was also charged with resisting lawful arrest, trespass, disobedience to a lawful order of the tribal court, and public intoxication.) Lara pleaded guilty to the tribal charge of "violence to a policeman". (Note: Lara was sentenced to 90 days in jail for the tribal offense.) Soon after, federal prosecutors charged Lara with assault on a federal officer and a federal grand jury indicted him. Lara moved to dismiss the charge based on double jeopardy and other constitutional grounds. (Note: Lara brought up the constitutional issues of double jeopardy ("[N]or shall any person be subject for the same offence to be twice put in jeopardy of life or limb ..."), selective prosecution,("[N]or deny to any person within its jurisdiction the equal protection of the laws.") and due process ("[N]or be deprived of life, liberty, or property, without due process of law ...").) The Federal District Court, with Magistrate Judge Alice R. Senechal sitting by consent, denied the motions and Lara entered a conditional guilty plea, reserving the right to appeal. Senechal noted that two other trial courts in the circuit had already ruled that double jeopardy did not apply, that the ICRA only recognized the inherent sovereignty of the tribes and did not delegate prosecutorial power to the tribe. She further noted that another circuit court had ruled the same way. Lara also argued that the Petite doctrine, (Note: The Petite doctrine requires the U.S. Attorney to determine that: 1) there is a substantial federal interest; 2) that the other prosecution left that interest unvindicated; and 3) the same test is applied to all federal prosecutions. Finally, the approval of the appropriate Assistant Attorney General is also required.) if applied, would preclude his prosecution, and that since it was never applied to federal prosecutions following convictions in tribal court, it discriminated against Indians. Senechal denied this motion, noting that Lara had shown no examples of other races not being prosecuted for like offenses.

==== Court of Appeals ====
Lara appealed the denial of his motion to dismiss to the Eighth Circuit Court of Appeals, arguing that the Tribal Court obtained its authority from the ICRA, an act of Congress, and that both the Tribal Court and the Federal Court derived their power from the same sovereign. A three-judge panel of the Circuit Court (Note: The panel consisted of C.J. David R. Hansen, J. George G. Fagg, and J. Pasco M. Bowman II.) affirmed the decision of the District Court, holding that the tribe derived its power from its own retained sovereignty that was separate from the sovereignty of the United States. The Eighth Circuit's panel noted that in the Duro decision, the Supreme Court had observed that Congress could address the jurisdictional system, which Congress did. When Congress amended the ICRA, they were addressing a federal common law issue, not a constitutional issue, and were within their authority to recognize the sovereignty of the tribes. The panel then affirmed the trial court on the Petite claim. Judge Hansen dissented, believing that the tribe drew its authority to try Lara from the federal government.

Lara then requested a rehearing en banc by the full court. The request was granted, and the full court reversed the decision of the three-judge panel, ordering that the federal indictment be dismissed on the grounds of double jeopardy. While the court noted that the Fifth Amendment allowed prosecution by two separate sovereigns, such as the federal government and a state government, it found that an Indian tribe derived its authority to prosecute offenders from the ICRA, which was federal law. The court noted that in previous Supreme Court rulings, the determination of tribal jurisdiction was based on the tribal membership of the individual, not on his race as an Indian. This meant that double jeopardy attached. The United States then appealed to the Supreme Court, which granted certiorari to hear the case. (Note: At least in part, it appears that the Supreme Court took the case to resolve a circuit split–the Ninth Circuit had held there was no federal delegation of power, and thus no double jeopardy, while the Eighth Circuit had held the opposite and it was double jeopardy.)

== Supreme Court ==
=== Arguments ===
==== United States ====
Solicitor General Ted Olson argued that Congress, in response to the Duro decision, acted to "recognize and affirm" the Indian tribe's inherent power to enforce its criminal laws against Indians of other tribes. Olson noted that the United States v. Wheeler decision clearly stated that a tribe could prosecute a tribal member for a crime and that the Federal government could subsequently prosecute for the same criminal acts without invoking double jeopardy if the actions of the accused violated Federal law. Olson noted that the legislative history of the Duro fix bill clearly indicated that Congress intended to restore, not delegate, authority to prosecute non-member Indians by a tribe. The government argued that the limitation in Duro was a statutory limitation of the tribe's sovereignty, not a constitutional limit, and that Congress had the authority to remove that limitation. He noted that a tribe's sovereignty has allowed prosecution of non-member Indians for centuries, until it was limited by Congress. The United States was supported by amicus briefs filed by the State of Washington and seven other states, (Note: The states were Washington, Arizona, California, Colorado, Michigan, Montana, New Mexico and Oregon.) the State of Idaho and five other states, (Note: The states were Idaho, Alabama, Louisiana, Nebraska, South Dakota, and Utah.) the National Congress of American Indians, and eighteen Indian tribes. (Note: The tribes were the Confederated Salish and Kootenai Tribes of the Flathead Nation, Confederated Tribes of the Warm Springs Reservation, Eastern Band of Cherokee, Lac Courte Oreilles Tribe, Lummi Nation, Menominee Tribe, Metlakatla Indian Community, Mississippi Band of Choctaw Indians, Mohegan Tribe, Nez Perce Tribe, Oglala Sioux Tribe, Pascua Yaqui Tribe, Pawnee Nation of Oklahoma, Pueblo of Laguna, Pueblo of Santa Clara, Salt River Pima-Maricopa Indian Community, Spirit Lake Sioux Tribe, and Three Affiliated Tribes of the Fort Berthold Reservation.)

==== Lara ====
Alexander F. Reichert was appointed by the Supreme Court to argue the case for Lara. Reichert argued that an Indian tribe had no inherent sovereignty in regards to non-member Indians, but only the power that Congress decided to give the tribe, citing Duro, Wheeler, and Oliphant v. Suquamish Indian Tribe (Note: Oliphant held that a tribe had no authority to a non-Indian for an offense against an Indian on tribal lands.) to support his argument. He stated that it was the place of the Supreme Court, not Congress, to determine the inherent sovereignty of the tribe. Lara argued that since the tribe had no such inherent sovereignty, it could only prosecute a non-member Indian based upon federal sovereignty, which would make a subsequent Federal prosecution a violation of the prohibition of double jeopardy. It was noted that members of Indian tribes were at the same time United States citizens, and protected under the constitution in the same manner as any other citizen. Reichert stated that Duro was decided as a constitutional issue, not as a matter of common law, and it was the Court's place to determine the issue, not the place of Congress. To subject Lara to a prosecution by a tribal court, which was not subject to the Bill of Rights, (Note: Indian tribes are not bound by the Bill of Rights.) would deprive Lara of his rights as a United States citizen. Lara's position was supported by amicus curiae briefs filed by the National Association of Criminal Defense Lawyers, Lewis County, Idaho, (along with several other counties), (Note: The counties were Lewis County, Idaho, Mille Lacs County, Minnesota, and Thurston County, Nebraska.) the Citizen's Equal Rights Foundation, and T. Morris, E. Morris, and R. Morris (individual Indians).

=== Opinion of the Court ===
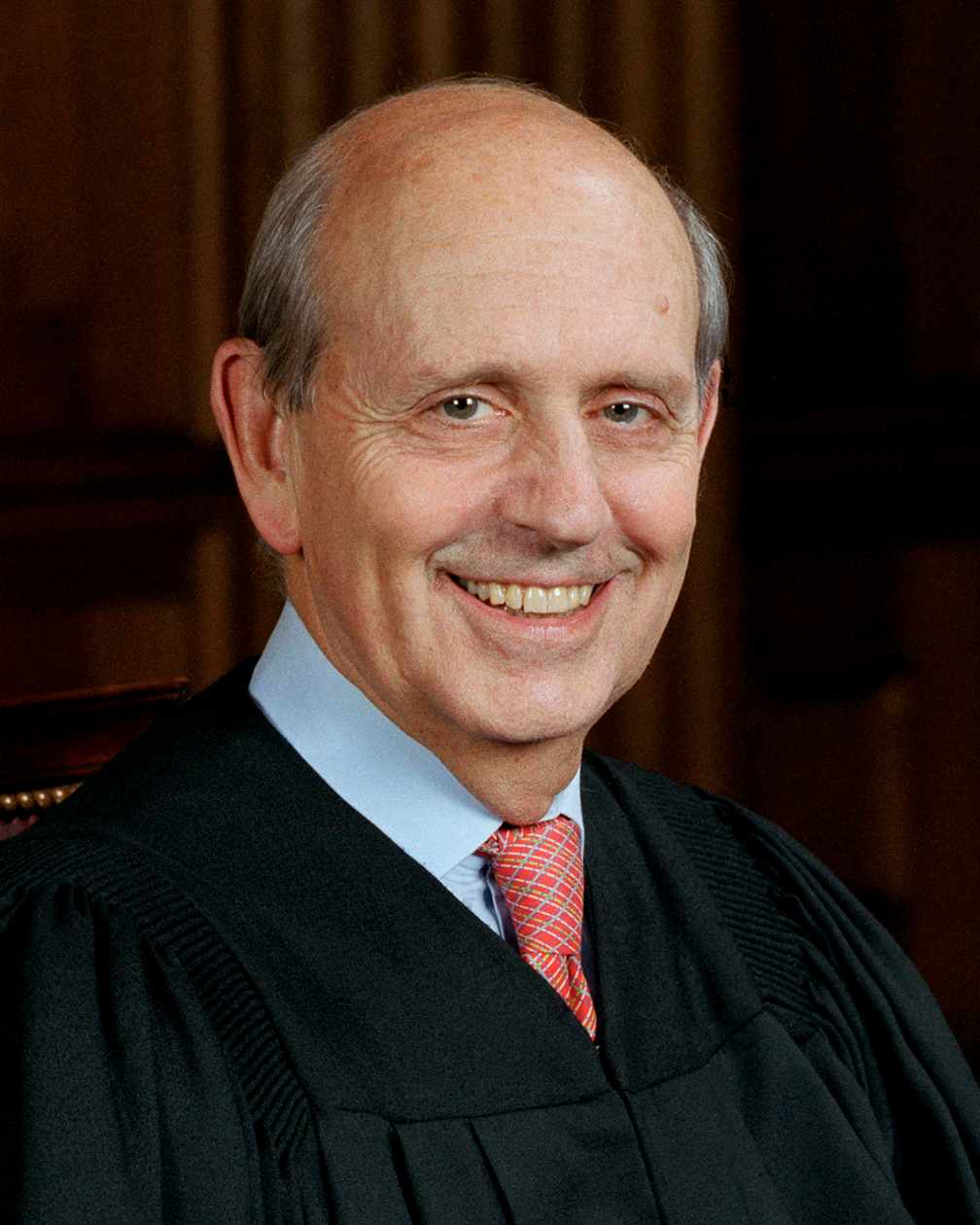
Justice Stephen Breyer wrote the majority opinion in Lara.

Justice Stephen Breyer delivered the opinion of the court on April 19, 2004. Breyer believed that the question the Court needed to answer was whether Congress had the authority to relax restrictions that had been imposed on an Indian tribe's inherent sovereignty. He noted that the intent of Congress was clear, not only based on the plain language of the statute, but also from its legislative history.

Breyer stated that the Indian Commerce Clause of the United States Constitution granted Congress "plenary and exclusive" power to legislate in respect to the Indian tribes. He noted that the Indian Treaty Clause did not specifically grant Congress the right to legislate, but that treaties made pursuant to the clause could grant Congress the authority to legislate in regards to treaty matters.

These powers included the ability to both restrict tribal powers or to relax such restrictions. (Note: Breyer noted the many shifts in federal Indian policy, from removal to self-determination, the last of which substantially relaxed prior restrictions that Congress had placed on the tribes.) Congress has done both, such as in the withdrawal of federal recognition of the Menominee tribe with the Menominee Termination Act in 1954, and the Menominee Restoration Act to restore tribal recognition and powers. The earlier decisions in Duro, Wheeler, and Oliphant dealt with cases where Congress had restricted a tribe's inherent powers but pointed at nothing in the Constitution or established precedent that prohibits Congress from relaxing such restrictions. The decision in Duro was one of federal common law, and it is clear that Congress has the power to change that law. Since the power exercised by the Spirit Lake Sioux Tribe was that of inherent tribal sovereignty, double jeopardy did not attach.

Breyer noted Lara's other arguments, but as the double jeopardy issue was dispositive, he declined to address those issues. He did note that "we are not now faced with a question dealing with potential constitutional limits on congressional efforts to legislate far more radical changes in tribal status." The decision allowed both courts to prosecute Lara. Since separate sovereign bodies had filed the charges, double jeopardy did not apply to Lara's case. The decision of the Eighth Circuit Court was reversed in the 7–2 decision.

=== Concurrences ===
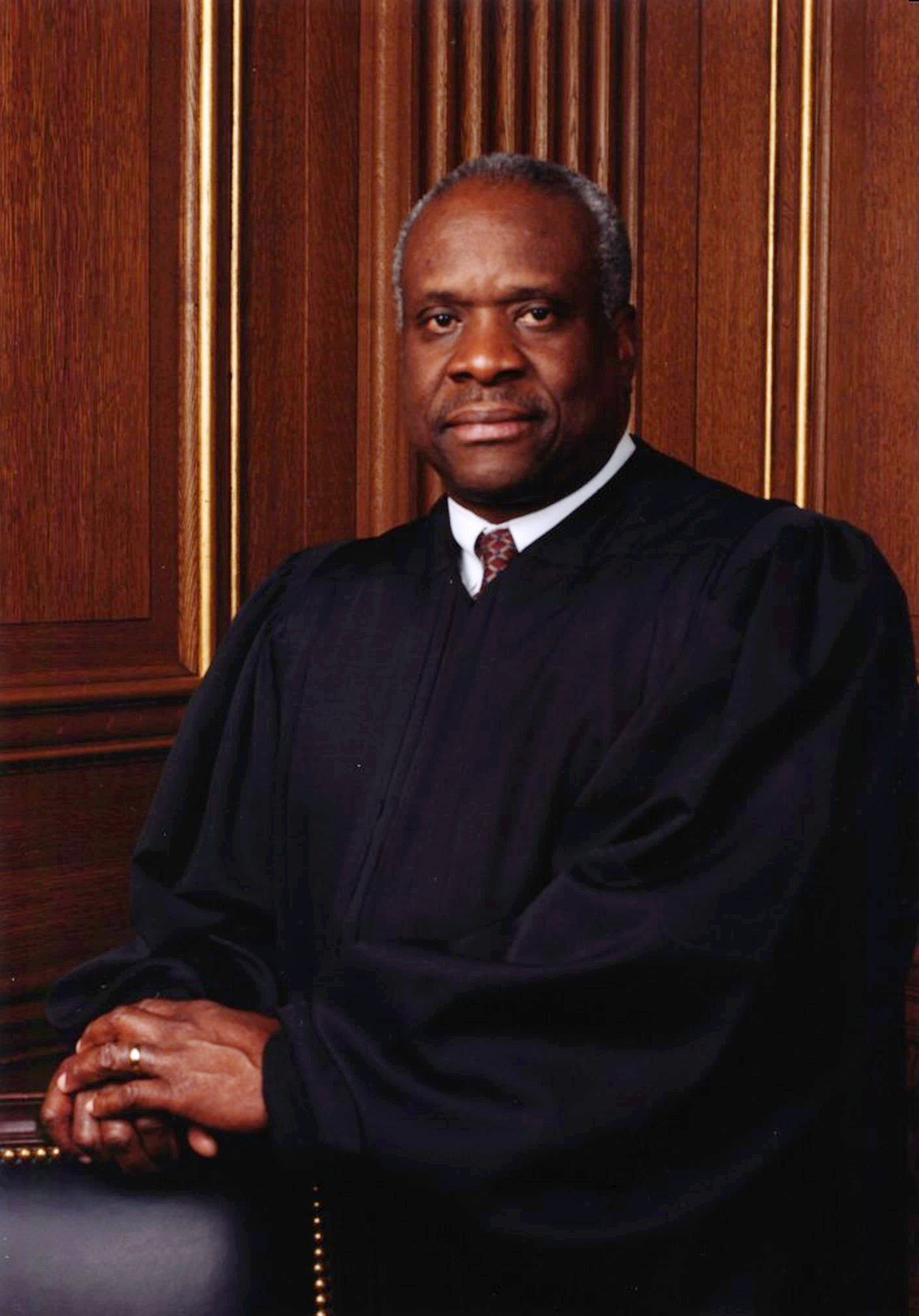
Justice Clarence Thomas, author of one of the concurring opinions

==== Justice Stevens ====
Justice John Paul Stevens wrote a concurring opinion that argued that the Indian tribes have a stronger claim on inherent sovereign powers than do individual states. He noted that the Indian tribes governed themselves since before Columbus arrived, and that most states never governed themselves outside of the United States.

==== Justice Kennedy ====
Justice Anthony Kennedy wrote a concurrence which stated that Congress was very careful to base the changes to the statute on inherent tribal powers and not on a delegation of authority. Kennedy states that is all that is needed to decide the case, but that the Court went further than was necessary when it decided that Congress had the power under the constitution to authorize tribes to prosecute non-member Indians. Finally, Kennedy was concerned that the court did not address the question of the Equal Protection Clause. He would have reversed the Eighth Circuit without going into the additional detail.

==== Justice Thomas ====
Justice Clarence Thomas wrote a concurring opinion stating that it was time to re-examine the entire concept of tribal sovereignty. He noted that doubtful precedents stated that Congress, and not another part of the government had the power to regulate everything that a tribe could or could not do, which renders tribal sovereignty a "nullity." Thomas did not believe that Congress has the constitutional authority to set the "metes and bounds of tribal sovereignty." He noted that such authority was not in the Indian Treaty Clause nor the Indian Commerce Clause. "In [his] view, the tribes either are or are not separate sovereigns, and our federal Indian law cases untenably hold both positions simultaneously." Thomas further questioned the law ending the practice of making treaties with the tribes, noting that this was the one clear constitutional provision that provides for dealing with other sovereigns. (Note: Thomas questioned the constitutionality of this act, noting that the power to make treaties rested with the President, not Congress.) Thomas noted that a delegation of prosecutorial power is always to an executive branch and that the tribes are not part of any executive branch of the Federal government. Therefore, the case hinges on the tribes' inherent sovereignty, and based on precedent, the tribes possess that power.

=== Dissent ===
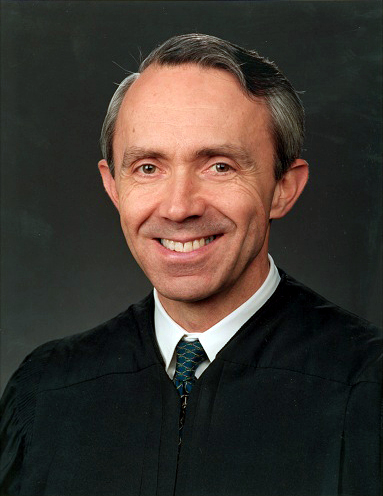
Justice David Souter, author of dissenting opinion

Justice David Souter wrote a dissenting opinion, which was joined by Justice Antonin Scalia. Souter referenced prior cases dealing with sovereignty and jurisdiction, from the decision made in United States v. Kagama, to the opinion made in South Dakota v. Bourland. Souter stated that the decision in this case did not align with precedent established in previous cases. Since Duro held that the tribes had lost their inherent sovereignty, the only way for the tribes to regain jurisdiction over non-member Indians would be by the delegation of that jurisdiction by Congress. Bourland was even more specific as to that point. Souter believed that the only two ways that the tribes could regain their sovereignty would be for Congress to declare that they were independent of the United States, as it did with the Philippines, or for the Court to overturn the concept of a dependent domestic sovereign.

Souter wrote that this dissonance in court decisions will lead to confusion, stating: "And confusion, I fear, will be the legacy of today's decision, for our failure to stand by what we have previously said reveals that our conceptualizations of sovereignty and dependent sovereignty are largely rhetorical." Souter concluded that he would stand by the decisions made in Duro and Oliphant.

== Subsequent developments ==
=== Release of Lara ===
Lara was released from federal prison on August 19, 2005, about a year and four months after the Supreme Court delivered their decision.

=== Law reviews ===
This case has been the subject of numerous law review articles since the decision was made. Points raised include:

- Indians are very integrated across tribal boundaries, intermarrying across tribes and sharing child and medical care services across tribes. Lara was an example of this; he married a Spirit Lake Sioux woman and moved to that reservation before his exclusion by the tribe.
- "As 'domestic dependent nations,' Indian tribes possess criminal jurisdiction in Indian Country that is 'complete, inherent, and exclusive,' except as limited by Congress."
- The decision enhanced tribal self-determination because tribes could act even in the presence of related federal activity. They noted that Lara had been in numerous altercations with the tribal police at Spirit Lake for intoxication, spousal abuse, and resisting arrest. Only when the tribe ran out of options did it issue an exclusion order to bar him from the reservation.
- The decision limited tribal sovereignty by affirming the ability of Congress to relax or to restrict tribal powers. The opinion of Justice Thomas was especially telling in this, as Thomas had opined that plenary power and tribal sovereignty were mutually exclusive.

=== Books and media ===
The case has been widely covered in books and news media. Tribal court authority has been altered by the U.S. government for decades, affecting jurisdictional powers. In Justice Thomas's conclusion at the end of this case, he stated, "History points in both directions." Thomas further stated, "Federal Indian policy, is, to say the least, schizophrenic." Thomas's statements directly address the Supreme Court's confusion on both present and future Federal Indian Policy. As Justice Souter stated in his dissent, this remains "an area peculiarly susceptible to confusion."

== See also ==
- Tribal sovereignty in the United States
