= Tennessee v. Lane =

- Supreme Court of the United States

Argued January 13, 2004 Decided May 17, 2004
- Full case name: Tennessee, Petitioner v. George Lane et al.
- Citations: 541 U.S. 509 (more) 124 S. Ct. 1978; 158 L. Ed. 2d 820

Case history
- Prior: Lane v. Tennessee, 315 F.3d 680 (6th Cir. 2003); cert. granted, 539 U.S. 941 (2003).

Holding
- Congress has the power under Section 5 of the Fourteenth Amendment to abrogate the States' sovereign immunity in cases implicating the fundamental right of access to the courts.

Court membership
- Chief Justice William Rehnquist Associate Justices John P. Stevens · Sandra Day O'Connor; Antonin Scalia · Anthony Kennedy; David Souter · Clarence Thomas; Ruth Bader Ginsburg · Stephen Breyer

Case opinions
- Majority: Stevens, joined by O'Connor, Souter, Ginsburg, Breyer
- Concurrence: Souter, joined by Ginsburg
- Concurrence: Ginsburg, joined by Souter, Breyer
- Dissent: Rehnquist, joined by Kennedy, Thomas
- Dissent: Scalia
- Dissent: Thomas

Laws applied
- Americans with Disabilities Act of 1990; Fourteenth Amendment; Eleventh Amendment

Tennessee v. Lane, 541 U.S. 509 (2004), was a case in the Supreme Court of the United States involving Congress's enforcement powers under section 5 of the Fourteenth Amendment.

== Background ==
The plaintiffs were disabled Tennesseans who could not access the upper floors in state courthouses. They sued in federal court, arguing that since Tennessee was denying them public services because of their disabilities, it was violating Title II of the Americans with Disabilities Act (ADA). Under Title II, no one can be denied access to public services due to his or her disability; it allows those whose rights have been violated to sue states for money damages.

Tennessee argued that the Eleventh Amendment prohibited the suit, and filed a motion to dismiss the case. It relied principally on Board of Trustees of the University of Alabama v. Garrett (2001), in which the Supreme Court held that Congress had, in enacting certain provisions of the ADA, unconstitutionally abrogated the sovereign immunity of the States by letting people sue the States for discrimination on the basis of disability. That case, in turn, relied on the rule laid down by City of Boerne v. Flores: Congress may abrogate the Eleventh Amendment using its section 5 powers only if the way it seeks to remedy discrimination is "congruent and proportional" to the discrimination itself. Garrett had held that Congress had not met the congruent-and-proportional test – i.e., that it had not amassed enough evidence of discrimination on the basis of disability to justify the abrogation of sovereign immunity.

== Opinion of the Court ==
In Lane, the Supreme Court split 5–4. In the majority opinion written by Justice John Paul Stevens, the Court ruled that Congress did have enough evidence that disabled people were being denied those fundamental rights that are protected by the Due Process clause of the Fourteenth Amendment, among those rights being the right to access a court. Further, the remedy Congress enacted was congruent and proportional, because the "reasonable accommodations" mandated by the ADA were not unduly burdensome and disproportionate to the harm. Garrett, the Court said, applied only to Equal Protection claims, not to Due Process claims. Therefore, the law was constitutional. Chief Justice William Rehnquist and Associate Justices Clarence Thomas and Antonin Scalia filed dissents.

== See also ==
- List of United States Supreme Court cases, volume 541
- List of United States Supreme Court cases by the Rehnquist Court
