= McConnell v. FEC =

McConnell v. Federal Election Commission
- Supreme Court of the United States

Argued September 8, 2003 Decided December 10, 2003
- Full case name: Addison Mitchell McConnell v. Federal Election Commission
- Docket no.: 02-1674
- Citations: 540 U.S. 93 (more) 124 S. Ct. 619; 157 L. Ed. 2d 491; 2003 U.S. LEXIS 9195; 72 U.S.L.W. 4015; 17 Fla. L. Weekly Fed. S 13
- Argument: Oral argument

Case history
- Prior: Mixed ruling by the United States District Court for the District of Columbia

Holding
- Not all political speech is protected by the First Amendment from government infringement. United States District Court for the District of Columbia affirmed in part, reversed in part.

Court membership
- Chief Justice William Rehnquist Associate Justices John P. Stevens · Sandra Day O'Connor; Antonin Scalia · Anthony Kennedy; David Souter · Clarence Thomas; Ruth Bader Ginsburg · Stephen Breyer

Case opinions
- Majority: Stevens, O'Connor (Titles I and II), joined by Souter, Ginsburg, Breyer
- Majority: Rehnquist (Titles III and IV), joined by O'Connor, Scalia, Kennedy, Souter; Stevens, Ginsburg, Breyer (in part); Thomas (in part)
- Majority: Breyer (Title V), joined by Stevens, O'Connor, Souter, Ginsburg
- Concur/dissent: Scalia
- Concur/dissent: Thomas, joined by Scalia (Parts I, II–A, and II–B)
- Concur/dissent: Kennedy, joined by Rehnquist; Scalia (in part); Thomas (in part)
- Dissent: Rehnquist, joined by Scalia, Kennedy
- Dissent: Stevens, joined by Ginsburg, Breyer

Laws applied
- U.S. Const. amend. I, Bipartisan Campaign Reform Act
- Overruled by
- Citizens United v. FEC (2010) (in part)

McConnell v. Federal Election Commission, 540 U.S. 93 (2003), is a case in which the United States Supreme Court upheld the constitutionality of most of the Bipartisan Campaign Reform Act (BCRA), often referred to as the McCain–Feingold Act.

The case takes its name from Senator Mitch McConnell, Republican of Kentucky, and the Federal Election Commission, the federal agency that oversees U.S. campaign finance laws.

It was partially overruled by Citizens United v. FEC, 558 U.S. 310 (2010).

== History ==
The case was brought by groups such as the California Democratic Party and the National Rifle Association, and individuals including U.S. Senator Mitch McConnell, then the Senate Majority Whip, who argued that BCRA was an unconstitutional infringement on their First Amendment rights. McConnell had been a longtime opponent of BCRA in the Senate, and had led several Senate filibusters to block its passage.

In early 2002, a multi-year effort by senators John McCain and Russell Feingold to reform the way money is raised and spent on political campaigns culminated in the passage of the Bipartisan Campaign Reform Act of 2002 (the so-called McCain-Feingold bill). Its key provisions were 1) a ban on unrestricted ("soft money") donations made directly to political parties (often by corporations, unions, or wealthy individuals) and on the solicitation of those donations by elected officials; 2) limits on the advertising that unions, corporations, and non-profit organizations can engage in up to 60 days prior to an election; and 3) restrictions on political parties' use of their funds for advertising on behalf of candidates (in the form of "issue ads" or "coordinated expenditures").

In May 2003, a three-judge panel of the United States District Court for the District of Columbia ruled three sections of the challenged provisions unconstitutional, and upheld two other sections. The District Court's ruling was stayed during the appeal to the United States Supreme Court.

== Oral arguments ==
The Supreme Court heard oral arguments in a special session on September 8, 2003. On December 10, 2003, it issued a complicated decision totaling 272 pages in length, that, with a 5-4 majority, upheld the key provisions of McCain-Feingold including (1) the "electioneering communication" provisions (which required disclosure of and prohibited the use of corporate and union treasury funds to pay for or broadcast cable and satellite ads clearly identifying a federal candidate targeted to the candidate's electorate within 30 days of a primary or 60 days of a general election); and (2) the "soft money" ban (which prohibited federal parties, candidates, and officeholders from raising or spending funds not in compliance with contribution restrictions, and prohibited state parties from using such "soft money" in connection with federal elections).

== Opinions ==
Justices John Paul Stevens, Sandra Day O'Connor, David Souter, Ruth Bader Ginsburg and Stephen Breyer established the majority for two parts of the Court's opinion:

- With respect to Titles I and II of BCRA, O'Connor and Stevens jointly wrote the opinion of the Court.
- With respect to Title V of BCRA, Breyer wrote the Court's opinion.

Because the regulations dealt mostly with soft-money contributions that were used to register voters and increase attendance at the polls, not with campaign expenditures (which are more explicitly a statement of political values and therefore deserve more protection), the Court held that the restriction on free speech was minimal. It then found that the restriction was justified by the government's legitimate interest in preventing "both the actual corruption threatened by large financial contributions and... the appearance of corruption" that might result from those contributions.

In response to challenges that the law was too broad and unnecessarily regulated conduct that had not been shown to cause corruption (such as advertisements paid for by corporations or unions), the Court found that such regulation was necessary to prevent the groups from circumventing the law. O'Connor and Stevens wrote that "money, like water, will always find an outlet" and that the government was therefore justified in taking steps to prevent schemes developed to get around the contribution limits.

The Court also rejected the argument that Congress had exceeded its authority to regulate elections under Article I, Section 4 of the Constitution. The Court found that the law only affected state elections in which federal candidates were involved and also that it did not prevent states from creating separate election laws for state and local elections.

Chief Justice William Rehnquist wrote an opinion on titles III and IV of the BCRA, joined by O'Connor, Souter, Anthony Kennedy, Antonin Scalia, and by the other justices with respect to parts of the opinion. The Chief Justice's opinion struck down the provision banning political contributions by minors but ruled that the appellants lacked standing with regard to the rest of the challenges to titles III and IV.

Two dissenting opinions were included in the decision:

- Stevens, joined by Ginsburg and Breyer, dissented on one section of the part of the Court's opinion written by Rehnquist.
- Rehnquist, joined by Scalia and Kennedy, issued a 15-page dissent against the Court's opinion with respect to Titles I and V of the BCRA.

Three other justices wrote separate opinions on the decision:

- Kennedy issued a 68-page opinion with an appendix, concurring in part and dissenting in part, noting that BCRA forces "speakers to abandon their own preference for speaking through parties and organizations."
- Scalia issued a separate 19-page opinion, a "few words of [his] own," because of the "extraordinary importance" of the cases. He argued this standard is an example of incumbents attempting to protect themselves, noting incumbents raise three-times as much hard-money.
- Justice Clarence Thomas issued a separate 25-page opinion arguing that the Court was upholding the "most significant abridgment of the freedoms of speech and association since the Civil War."

== Reception ==
The holding of the case was determined to be very confusing, although many news sources accurately summarized the main holdings. The Federal District Court for the District of Columbia's opinion is likely the longest opinion ever issued by a court in the United States: the opinion was 743 pages.

== See also ==
- James Bopp
- List of United States Supreme Court cases, volume 540
- List of United States Supreme Court cases
- Buckley v. Valeo (1976), regarding Federal Election Campaign Act of 1971
