= Oliver Grace =

Irish landowner and politician

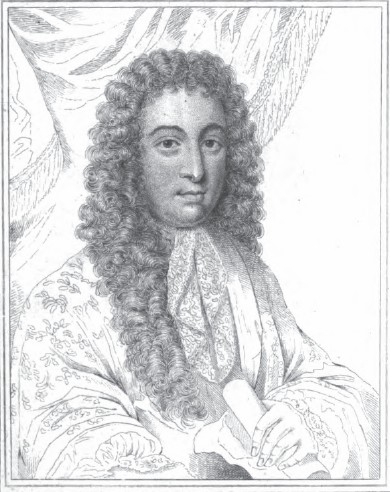
Oliver Grace, Chief Remembrancer of the Exchequer of Ireland

Oliver Grace, of Shanganagh (now Gracefield), was chosen in 1689 as the representative in Parliament of the borough of Ballynakill, in the Queen's County, Ireland. Oliver Grace died on 8 June 1708 and is buried in the south wing of Arles Church (or Grace's Chapel) of which he was the founder.

== Political career ==
Oliver Grace was Chief Remembrancer of the Irish Exchequer and a member of the Privy Council of King James II. Although a supporter of Catholic King James II during the Williamite War in Ireland, Oliver Grace was trusted and respected by the Protestant Landed Gentry of Queen's County. When the Jacobites held the upper hand in Ireland, several large Protestant estates were assigned over to him in trust whose proprietors relied solely on his honor for their restoration. When the forces of William of Orange ultimately triumphed, Irish Protestants prevailed on King William III to grant Oliver Grace a pardon for his adherence to James II, which he received on 21 May 1696.

== Ancestry and family ==
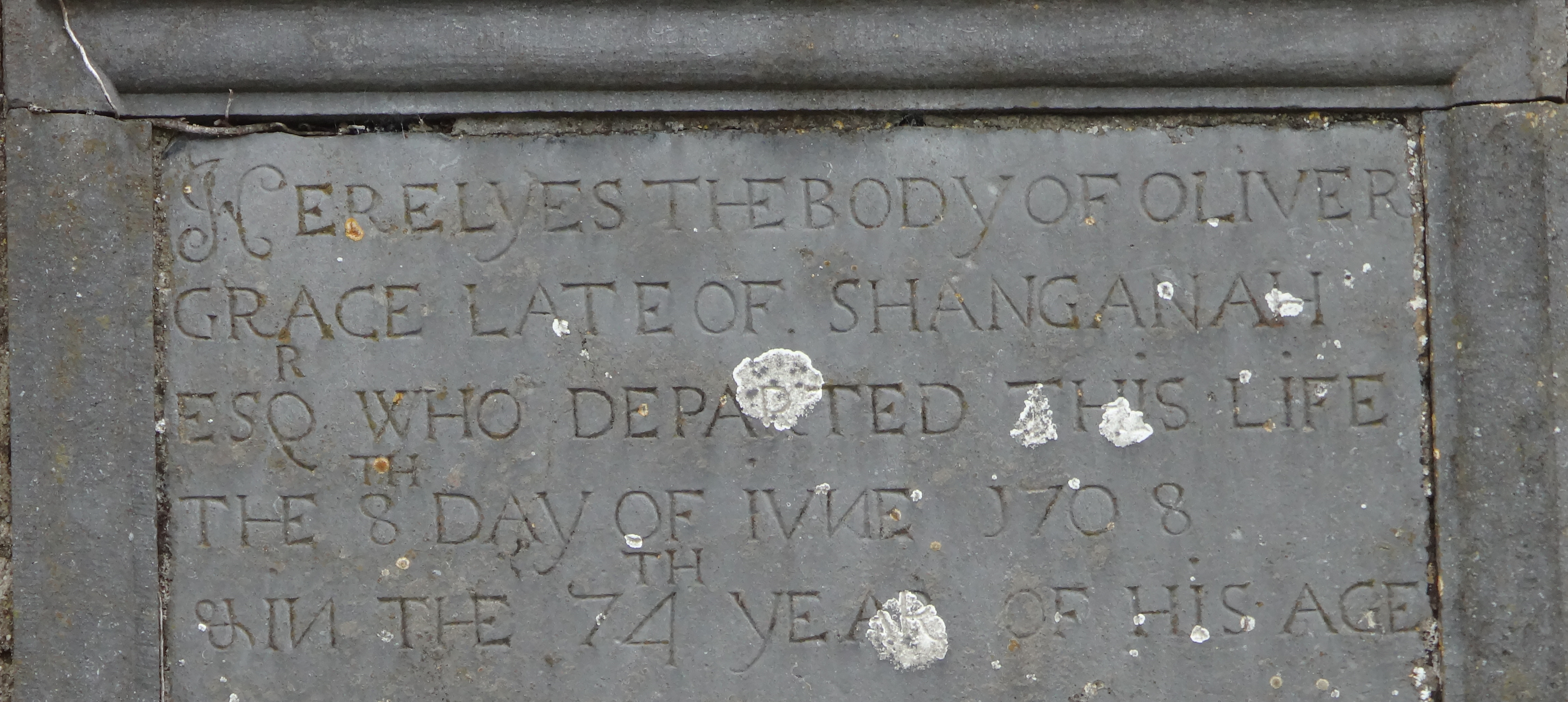
Oliver Grace Mausoleum Inscription

Oliver Grace's 3rd great-grandfather, Sir Oliver Grace, was Knight of Ballylinch and Legan Castles, County Kilkenny, Lord of Carney, Tipperary, and Member of Parliament (MP) for that county in 1559. He married Mary, daughter of Sir Gerald Fitzgerald, 3rd Lord Decies, by his wife Ellice, daughter of Piers Butler, 8th Earl of Ormonde.

Oliver Grace married Elizabeth, only surviving child of John Bryan, of Bawnmore, County Kilkenny, and by her had issue:

- Michael, his heir, who died on 19 November 1760
- Robert
- Sheffield, who died in 1699
- Lettice, who married John Grace, feudal baron of Courtstown
- Anne, married first, to Richard, eldest son of Sir Richard Nagle, Secretary of State for Ireland, temp. James II; married secondly, Edmond Butler, 8th Lord Dunboyne, and was mother of the 9th, 10th, and 12th lords
- Ellis, or Alicia, who married Samuel Gale, of the Ashfield Gales, Queen's County

Oliver Grace died on 8 June 1708 and is buried in the south wing of Arles Church (or Grace's Chapel) of which he was the founder.

Oliver's descendants included the Grace baronets from 1818 to 1977.

Ancestors of Oliver Grace

Gerald Grace
Oliver Grace
Margaret Hartpole
Gerald Grace
Edmund Butler
Margaret Butler
William Grace
Edmond Bulter
Ellen Butler
Thomas Caher
Margaret Caher
Oliver Grace
Pierce FitzThomas Butler
Sir Edward Butler
Katherine Slane
Piers (Peter) Butler
Edmund Butler
Anne Butler
Eleanor Butler
Nicholas Netterville
Margaret Netterville
Sir John Bathe
Eleanor Bathe

== Bibliography ==
- Brewer, James Norris (1826). The Beauties of Ireland: Being Original Delineations, Topographical, Historical, and Biographical, of Each County, Volume 2. London: Sherwood, Gilbert and Piper.
- Burke, Sir Bernard (1914). A Genealogical and Heraldic History of the Peerage and Baronetage, the Privy Council, Knightage and Companionage. London: Harrison & Sons.
- Burke, Sir Bernard (1871). A Genealogical and Heraldic History of the Landed Gentry of Great Britain & Ireland, Volume 1. London: Harrison, Pall Mall.
- Grace, Sheffield (1823). Memoirs of the Family of Grace. London: Weed and Rider.
- Mason, William Shaw (1819). A Statistical Account, or Parochial Survey of Ireland, Volume 3. Dublin: Faulkner Press.
