= Dumfries, Virginia =

- Town
- Town of Dumfries
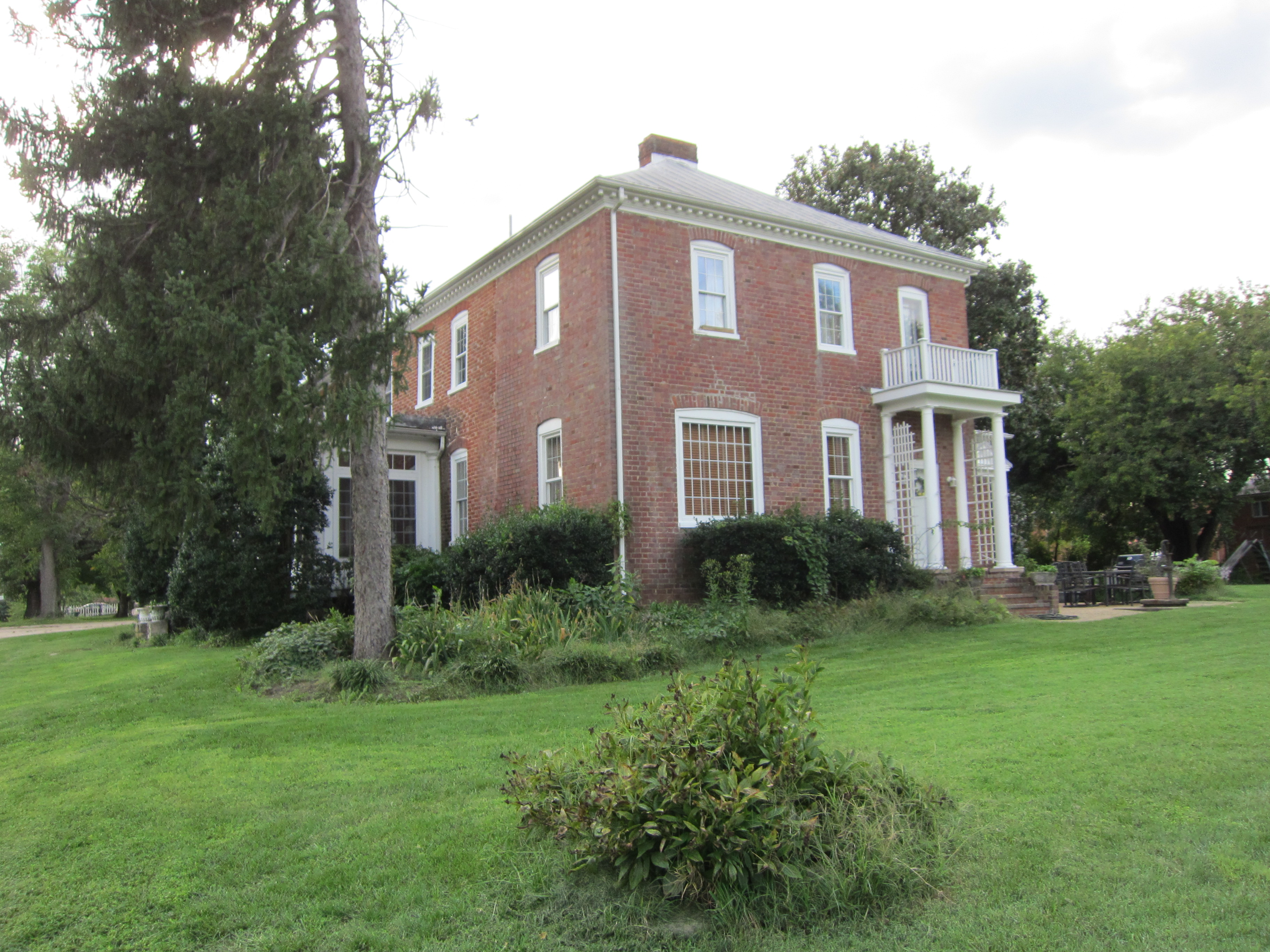
- Henderson House

- Seal

- Location in Prince William County and the state of Virginia
- Coordinates: 38°34′4″N 77°19′29″W
- Country: United States
- State: Virginia
- County: Prince William
- Founded: 1749

Government
  - Mayor: Derrick R. Wood

Area
  - Total: 1.55 sq mi (4.02 km^{2})
  - Land: 1.54 sq mi (3.98 km^{2})
  - Water: 0.019 sq mi (0.05 km^{2})
- Elevation: 36 ft (11 m)

Population (2020)
  - Total: 5,679
  - Estimate (2019): 5,922
  - Density: 3,858.0/sq mi (1,489.58/km^{2})
- Time zone: UTC−5 (Eastern (EST))
  - Summer (DST): UTC−4 (EDT)
- ZIP Code: 22026
- Area codes: 571, 703
- FIPS code: 51-23760
- GNIS feature ID: 1499362
- Website: www.DumfriesVA.gov

Dumfries (/dʌmfriːz/ DUM-freez), officially the Town of Dumfries, is a town in Prince William County, Virginia, United States. As of the 2020 census, Dumfries had a population of 5,679.

== Geography ==
Dumfries is located at 38°34′4″N 77°19′29″W (38.567853, −77.324591).

According to the United States Census Bureau, the town has a total area of 1.6 square miles (4.1 km^{2}), all of it land. The town is situated 70 miles north of the state capital, Richmond. It is 30 miles south of central Washington, D.C.

== History ==
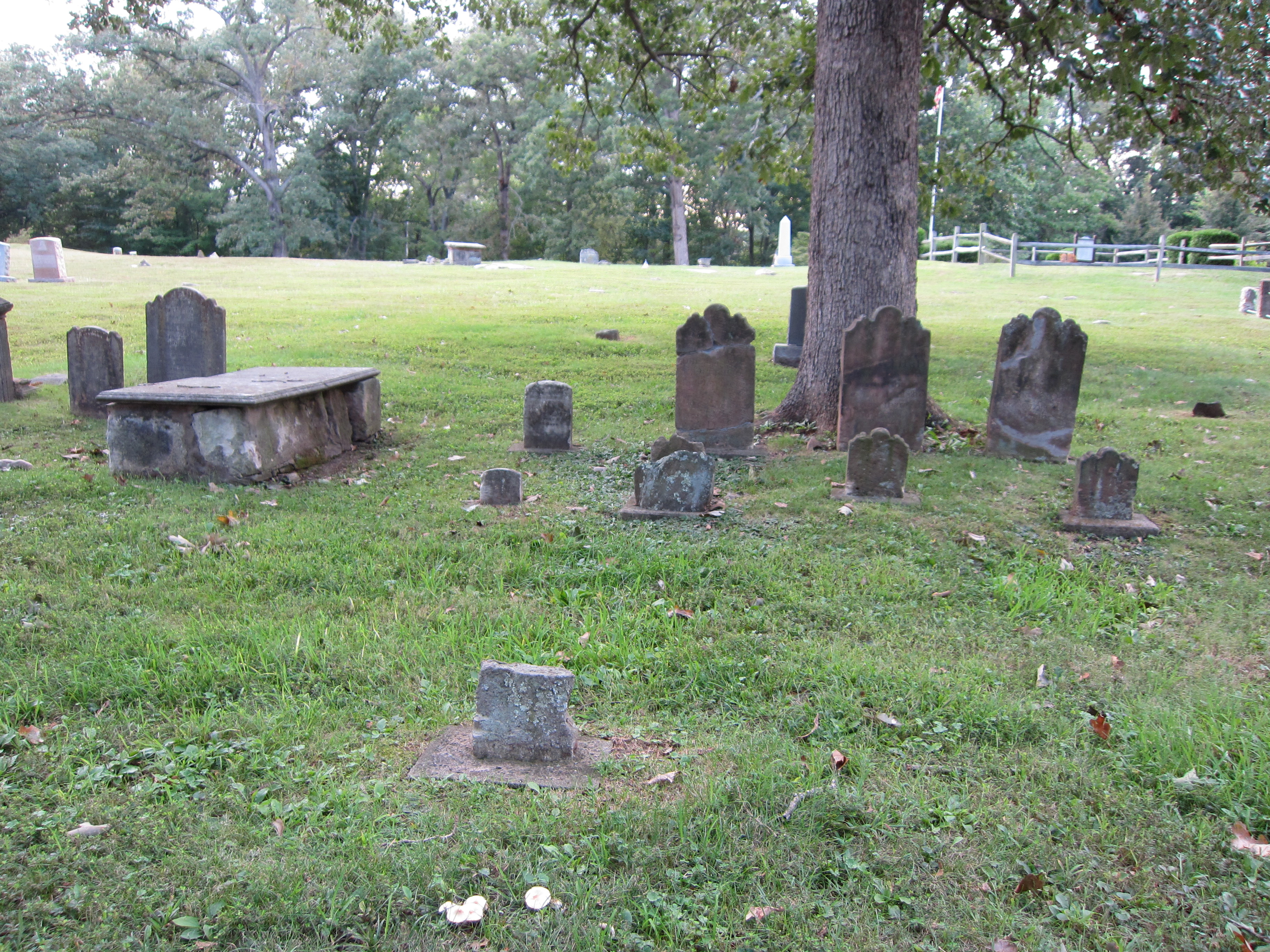
Dumfries Cemetery

The history of Dumfries began as early as 1690 when Richard Gibson erected a gristmill on Quantico Creek. A customhouse and warehouse followed in 1731, and many others cropped up along the estuary by 1732. The Town of Dumfries was formally established on 60 acres (240,000 m^{2}) of land at the head of the harbor of Quantico Creek, provided by John Graham. He named the town after his birthplace, Dumfries, Scotland.

After much political maneuvering, the General Assembly established Dumfries as the first of seven townships in the county. Dumfries received its charter on May 11, 1749, making it the oldest continuously chartered town in Virginia.

The Ceremonial Seal of the Town of Dumfries embodies elements of its heritage, from the period of 1651, when the first patents were issued to colonists, who following the Potomac recognized the value of a snug harbor in Quantico Creek. Thus the foundations for the establishment of a town, which in 1749 received its charter from the Colonial government in Williamsburg, Virginia.

The elements of the seal are contained within the pattern formed by the outer frame of a hawser rope or cable, and the inner frame of an anchor chain, of a type employed in ships of the Colonial era.

Within these frames are found items which are consistent with a town of maritime background. They are overlaid on a chart of the Chesapeake Bay and the Potomac River, with Dumfries indicated at the head of Quantico Creek. The navigational aids of the sextant and compass rose complete the maritime motif.

The two water fowl relate to the wetlands of Quantico Creek. The dock with fishnet, pilings, ships block and line further the theme of a mercantile port of call. The thistle indicates the Scottish founders of the town, with the name of Dumfries, taken by John Graham, the founder, in honor of his home in Scotland. The supporters of the shield are, on the left, a Piscataway brave, of the Powhatan Confederacy, the predominant tribe along the Potomac, in this area. On the right, a Colonial militiaman of 1775, when Colonel Henry Lee was company Commander. The shield in its upper quadrant, displays a sailing vessel of the period, and below the tobacco leaf, the first commodity, overlaid with shafts of wheat, the later commodity that supported the town.

When Dumfries became the second leading port in Colonial America receiving tobacco from the upland, it rivaled New York, Philadelphia and Boston. Dumfries peaked in size and importance in 1763. For about 15 years Dumfries was a thriving port when several factors brought about its demise: the Revolutionary War, erosion and siltation, and the shift in the main shipping commodity (from tobacco to wheat and sugar).

The Dumfries Cemetery contains burials of some of the Dumfries pioneers.

Alexander Henderson built a house known as the Henderson House which still stands on a hill in Dumfries, as well as owning various land in Prince William Forest Park. Alexander was a merchant when the ports were booming in Dumfries. Alexander is famous for his son, United States Marine Corps commandant Archibald Henderson.

The Leesylvania Archeological Site (44PW7), Old Hotel, and Weems-Botts Museum are listed on the National Register of Historic Places.

Dumfries was combined with the community of Triangle, Virginia, to form Dumfries-Triangle in the 1950 United States census. However, the two communities were separated again by the time of the 1960 census.

== Demographics ==
Historical population
Census	Pop.	Note	%±
1860	171		—
1870	167		−2.3%
1880	132		−21.0%
1900	160		—
1910	158		−1.2%
1920	182		15.2%
1930	157		−13.7%
1940	480		205.7%
1960	1,368		—
1970	1,890		38.2%
1980	3,214		70.1%
1990	4,282		33.2%
2000	4,937		15.3%
2010	4,961		0.5%
2020	5,679		14.5%
U.S. Decennial Census

As of the census of 2000, there were 4,937 people, 1,573 households, and 1,198 families residing in the town. The population density was 3,085.6 inhabitants per square mile (1,191.4/km^{2}). There were 1,699 housing units at an average density of 1,061.9 per square mile (410.0/km^{2}). The racial makeup of the town was 48.91% White, 35.26% Black, 0.63% Native American, 1.07% Asian, 3.73% from other races, and 8.40% from two or more races. Hispanic or Latino of any race were 15.06% of the population.

There were 1,573 households, out of which 46.5% had children under the age of 18 living with them, 48.8% were married couples living together, 19.7% had a female householder with no husband present, and 23.8% were non-families. Of all households, 16.5% were made up of individuals, and 3.7% had someone living alone who was 65 years of age or older. The average household size was 3.13 and the average family size was 3.51.

In the town, the population was spread out, with 35.0% under the age of 18, 9.7% from 18 to 24, 33.6% from 25 to 44, 17.1% from 45 to 64, and 4.7% who were 65 years of age or older. The median age was 29 years. For every 100 females, there were 98.8 males. For every 100 females age 18 and over, there were 93.0 males.

The median income for a household in the town was $43,672, and the median income for a family was $46,927. Males had a median income of $35,247 versus $24,451 for females. The per capita income for the town was $17,652. About 10.4% of families and 12.5% of the population were below the poverty line, including 16.0% of those under age 18 and 7.1% of those age 65 or over.

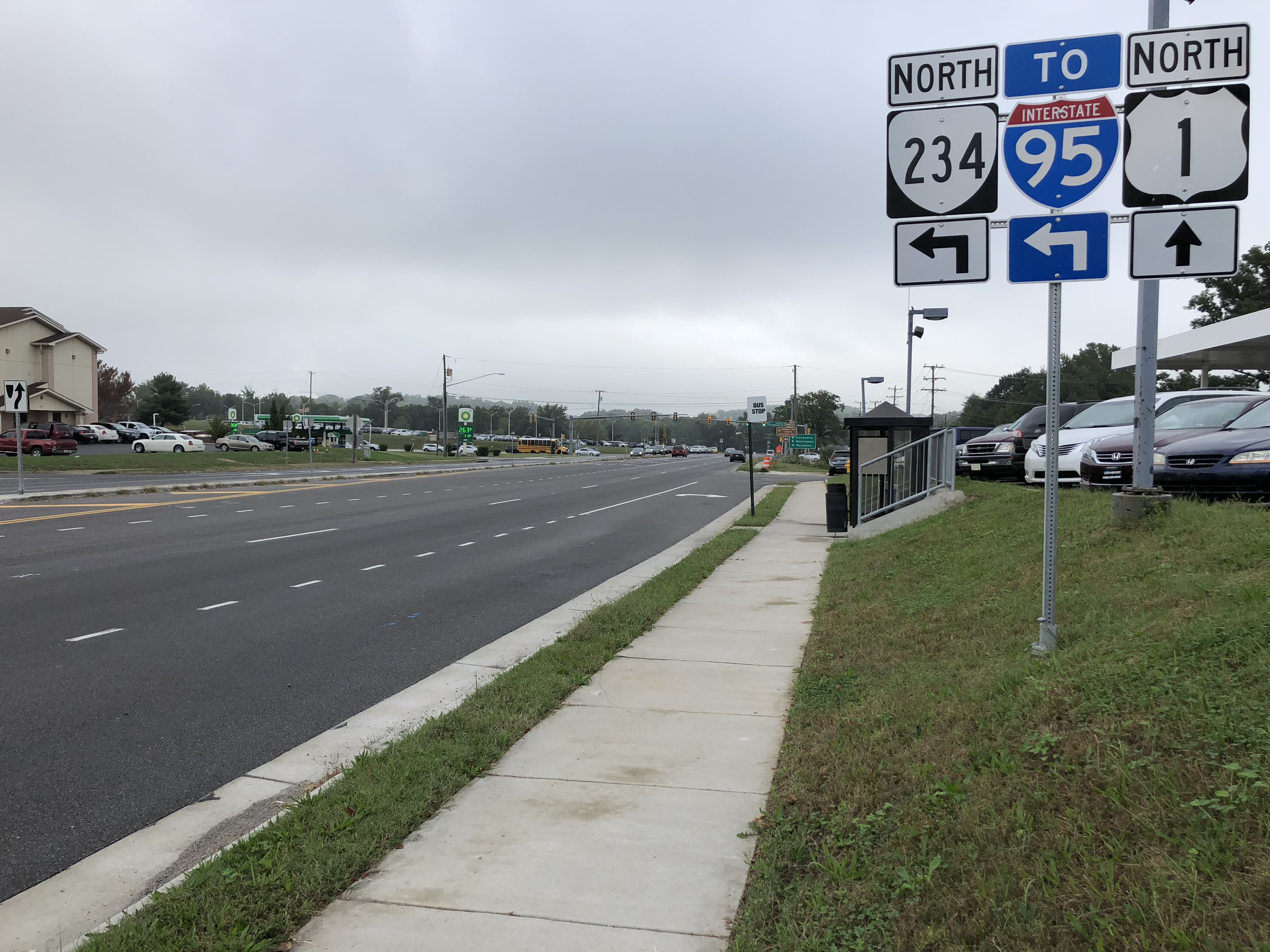
View north along US 1 just south of SR 234 in Dumfries

== Transportation ==
Primary road transportation to Dumfries is provided by U.S. Route 1. Virginia State Route 234 and Interstate 95 are also directly adjacent to Dumfries.

== Notable people ==
- Asa Blanchard, silversmith
- George Graham, acting U.S. Secretary of War (1816–1817) was born in Dumfries
- Alexander Henderson, merchant
- Ali Krieger, professional soccer player
- Kendall Marshall, professional basketball player
- Mason Locke Weems, George Washington biographer
