= Parnell Gale =

Irish mayor

Parnell Gale was Mayor of Galway in 1817.

== Political career ==
Prior to serving as Mayor, Parnell Gale was a collector of excise in Galway in 1815.

Parnell Gale’s term as major was marked by social unrest. Caused in part by meteorological conditions sparked off by volcanic activity, food shortages were prevalent in Galway in early 1817. In January 1817, Mayor Gale believed food riots could be controlled and resisted efforts to invoke the Peace Preservation Act, the equivalent of martial law. However, by March 1817, Gale was not so confident in maintaining order and in a letter to Dublin Castle, requested the cavalry be sent since mounted troops might more effectively pursue rioters. Rioters were attacking stores and merchant’s houses as well as removing the sails from ships so that vessels could not carry provisions from the town.

A good harvest and falling market prices finally brought the disturbances of 1817 to an end.

== Personal life ==
Parnell Gale was born in Queen’s County (present day County Laois), Ireland, the son of Anthony Gale and Anne Delany.

Parnell Gale is the brother of Anthony Gale, fourth Commandant of the United States Marine Corps.

Parnell Gale is buried at St. Nicholas' Collegiate Church in Galway. The inscription on Parnell Gale’s burial monument reads: "GALE Beneath are deposited the remains of Parnell Gale Esqr who departd this life May 19th 1818 ag'd 46 years after discharging the distinguished office of Mayor of this town with credit to himself and satisfaction to his fellow citizens."

== See also ==
Ashfield Gales

== Ancestry ==
Ancestors of Parnell Gale

Lt. Anthony Gale
Samuel Gale
___ Wandesford
Thomas Gale
Oliver Grace
Ellis (or Alicia) Grace
Elizabeth Bryan
Anthony Gale
Mabel
Parnell Gale
Martin Delany
Malachy Delany
James Albin
Barbara Albin
Anne
Ann Delany
John Sabatier
Jane Sabatier
Elizabeth Freeman

Civic offices
Preceded by Hyacinth Daly	Mayor of Galway; 1817	Succeeded by James Daly

== Bibliography ==
- Cunningham, John (2004). 'A town tormented by the sea': Galway, 1790-1914. Dublin: Geography Publications. ISBN 978-0-906602-32-4.
- Dutton, Hely (1824). A Statistical and Agricultural Survey of the County of Galway. Dublin: R. Graisberry.
- Hardiman, James (2004). The History of the Town and County of the Town of Galway. Galway, Ireland: Connacht Tribune Printing and Publishing Co.
- Henry, William (2002). Role of Honour: The Mayors of Galway City 1485-2001. Galway, Ireland: Galway City Council.
- O'Laughlin, Michael C. (1998). Families of Co. Galway, Ireland. Kansas City, MO: Irish Roots Cafe. ISBN 978-0-940134-00-3.
- Spellissy, Sean (1999). The History of Galway. Limerick, Ireland: Celtic Bookshop. ISBN 978-0-9534683-3-1.
- Stewart, John Watson (1815). The Gentleman's and Citizen's Almanack For the Year of our Lord 1815. Dublin: R. Graisberry.
