= Old Hotel =

Old Hotel may refer to:

- Old Hotel (Sugar Grove, Illinois), formerly listed on the National Register of Historic Places in Kane County, Illinois
- Old Hotel (Dumfries, Virginia), listed on the National Register of Historic Places in Prince William County, Virginia
