= Colchester, Virginia =

Unincorporated community in Virginia, United States

- Unincorporated community
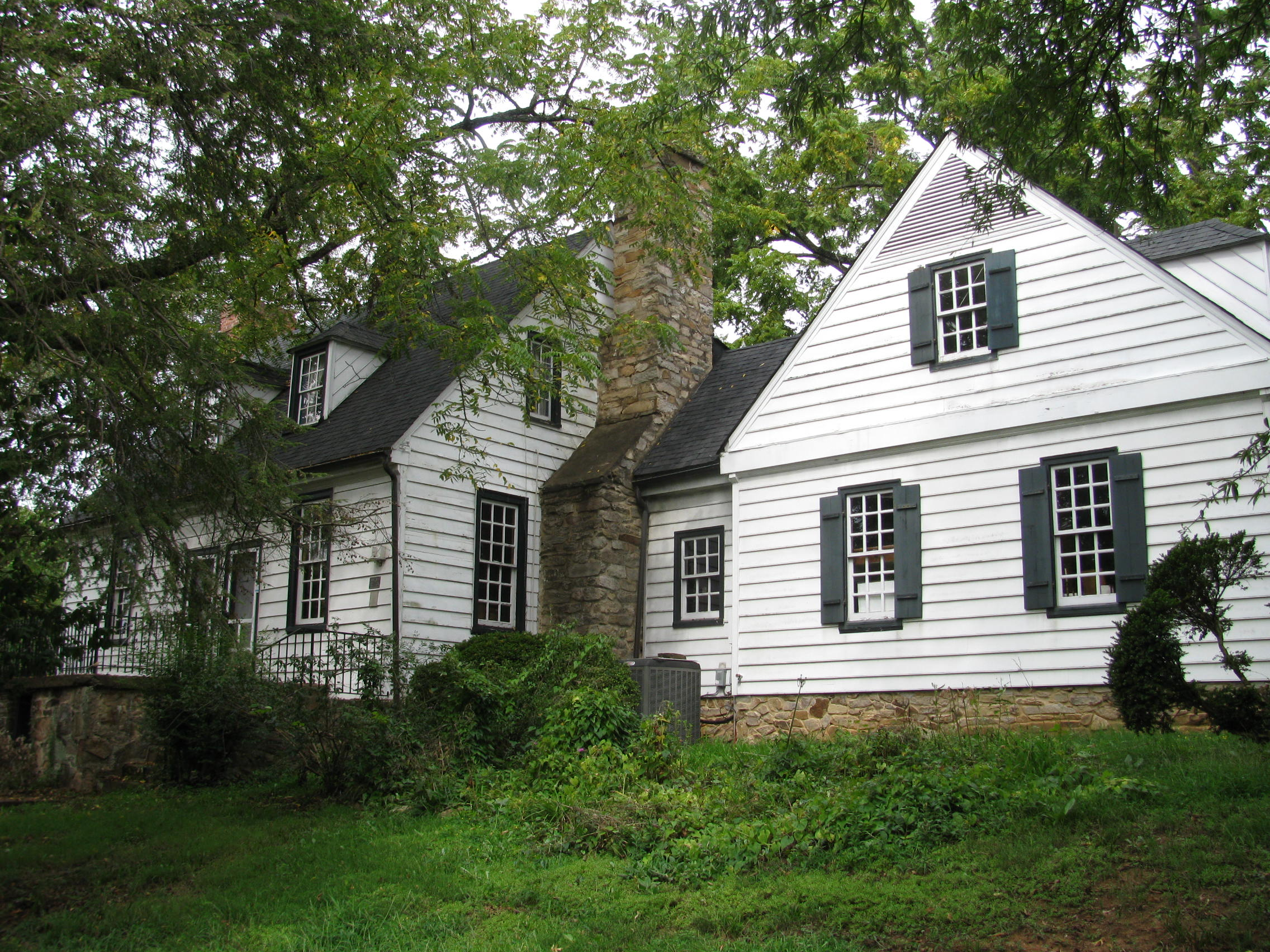
- The former Fairfax Arms

- Location within Northern Virginia Location within Virginia Location within the United States
- Coordinates: 38°40′7″N 77°14′3″W
- Country: United States
- State: Virginia
- County: Fairfax
- Time zone: UTC−5 (Eastern (EST))
  - Summer (DST): UTC−4 (EDT)

Colchester is a historic unincorporated community on the Occoquan River in Fairfax County, Virginia, United States.

== History ==
Colchester is a former tobacco port established in 1753. The port town was located on the old post road and Thomas Mason (son of George Mason) operated a ferry across the Occoquan River here. In 1798, Mason built a wooden bridge across the river; the bridge was washed away around 1807. Only one of Colchester's original buildings exists—the Fairfax Arms (10712 Old Colchester Road), which had been an ordinary and now owned by the Fairfax County Park Authority. The decline of the tobacco trade, silting of the river, and diversion of most shipping to the towns of Alexandria and Occoquan caused Colchester's decline.

== Transportation ==
Colchester was a stop on the Richmond, Fredericksburg and Potomac Railroad which was replaced by CSXT. Interstate 95, and the Jefferson Davis Highway (U.S. 1) are located directly to the west of the Colchester area.

Portions of roads that accessed Colchester still exist. Colchester Road in Clifton is part of SR 612, and Old Colchester Road, which runs north and becomes Telegraph Road leading to Alexandria, is part of SR 611. Farther to the northwest, the Snickersville Turnpike was historically named Colchester Road before it was improved in the early 1800s. The Loudoun County Board of Supervisors nearly renamed the county's portion of Braddock Road to Colchester Road in 1989.

== Notable people ==
- Archibald Henderson, the longest-serving Commandant of the United States Marine Corps, serving from 1820 to 1859
- Alexander Henderson, father of Archibald; a member of the Virginia General Assembly and a Virginia delegate to the Mount Vernon Conference in 1785
- William Grayson, Revolutionary War General, Virginia Senator

== See also ==
- National Register of Historic Places listings in Fairfax County, Virginia
