= Ashfield Gales =

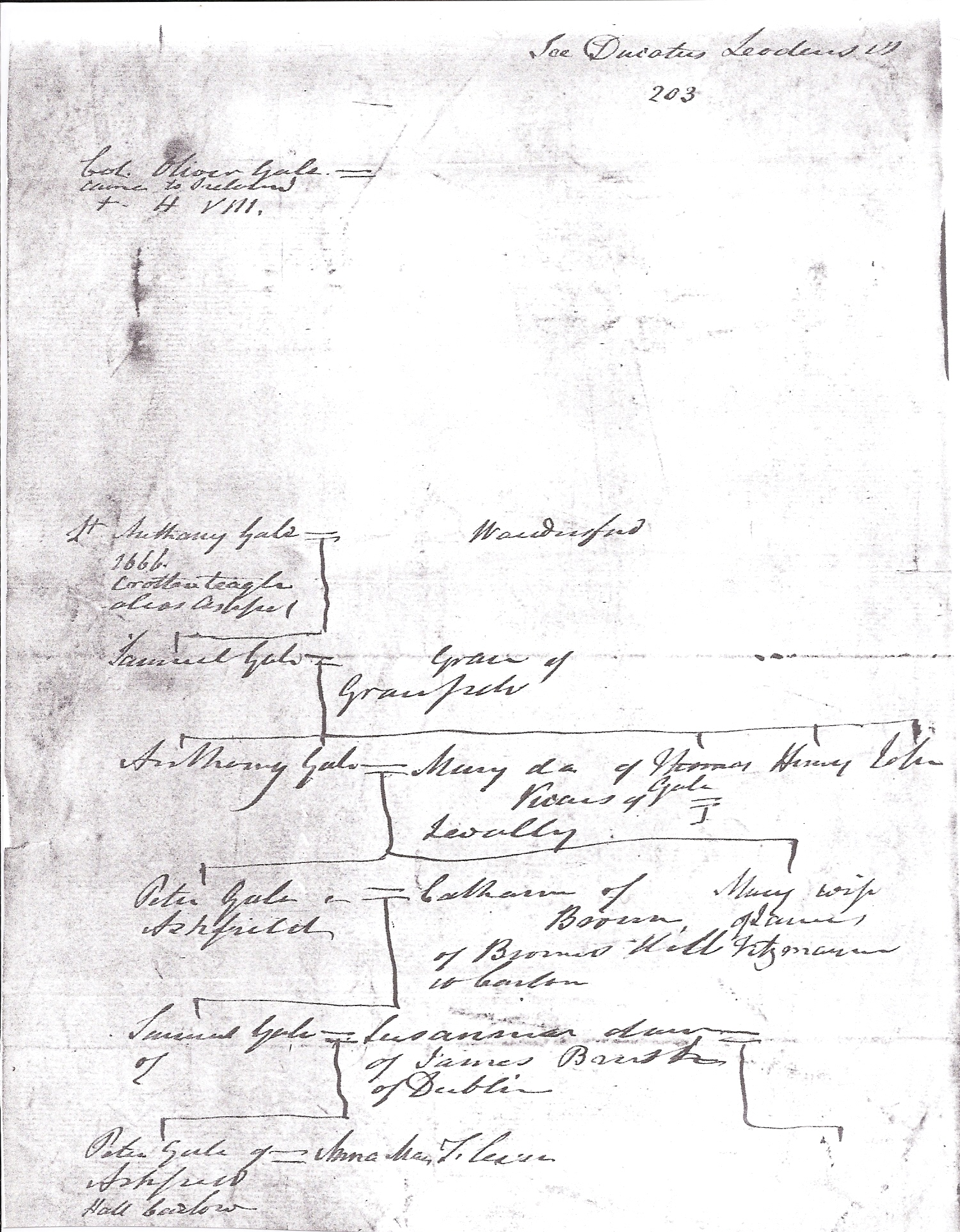
Sir William Betham pedigree of the Ashfield Gales

The Ashfield Gales consisted of six generations of a Gale family who owned the Ashfield estate in Killabban Parish, Queens County, Ireland (subsequently renamed County Laois) from the mid-17th century until 1851.

== History ==
The lineage of the Ashfield Gales was documented by Sir William Betham, Ulster King-of-Arms, who created thousands of sketch pedigrees of the era using sources such as his abstracts of the prerogative wills of Ireland from 1536–1800. According to Betham's pedigree, the Ashfield Gales descended from a Colonel Oliver Gale who came to Ireland during the time of Henry VIII, perhaps as part of the early English Plantations of Ireland. In support of the connection to Oliver Gale, Betham references Ducatus Leodiensis, which documents the pedigrees of many of the nobility and gentry of Yorkshire, England. According to this source, a son of Oliver Gale of Thrintoft, James Gale, resided in Ireland, "whence his Descendants during the Rebellion there transplanted themselves to Whitehaven". (In this context, the "Rebellion" is the Irish Rebellion of 1641.) The Ashfield Gales and the Yorkshire Gales displayed the same Coat of arms which further supports the connection between these families. This same Oliver Gale of Thrintoft pedigree is documented in Burke's Landed Gentry.

The Irish Rebellion of 1641 was initially successful, but was subsequently crushed by Oliver Cromwell during the invasion of 1649–1652 and British rule restored. To pay for the invasion, Cromwell confiscated large tracts of Irish Catholic land and granted it to army veterans in lieu of pay and to adventurers who helped finance the operation. Among those who were granted land was Anthony Gale, who "claims in right of an Adventurer as well as in right of a Soldier" who received land in Queen's and Westmeath Counties. The Queen's County grant of land was the former Crottentegle estate previously held and subsequently forfeited by the Keating family. The first record of this Anthony Gale in Ireland is the 1659 Census, where an Anthony Gayle (sic) appears as a titulado (land holder) in Crottentegle, Queen's County, site of the Gale Ashfield estate.

The Betham pedigree breaks at Col. Oliver Gale and picks up in 1666 with this Lt. Anthony Gale, the first of the Gales of Ashfield. Betham depicts Anthony Gale marrying into the Wandesford family. At the time, Sir Christopher Wandesford, a son of Christopher Wandesford, Lord Deputy of Ireland, lived in nearby Castlecomer in Kilkenny.

Anthony Gale was succeeded by his son, Samuel. Samuel married Ellis (or Alicia) Grace, daughter of Oliver Grace, Esq., Chief Remembrancer of the Exchequer of Ireland. These Graces were an ancient family in Ireland whose ancestry included Sir Oliver Grace, who married Mary, daughter of Sir Gerald Fitzgerald, 3rd Lord Decies, by his wife, Ellice, daughter of Piers Butler, 8th Earl of Ormond.

During the Williamite War in Ireland, Samuel ran afoul of the Jacobites who supported Catholic James II and was "given to the 1st Sept. 1689, to surrender". However, when the Jacobites were routed in the Battle of the Boyne on 1 July 1690, Samuel's claim to the estate at Ashfield was secure.

Betham documents four sons of Samuel Gale. The eldest surviving son, Anthony, succeeded to the estate at Ashfield, and married Mary Vicars in 1732. Anthony served on a grand jury in Maryborough (subsequently renamed Portlaoise), on 21 March 1746, along with members of other prominent Queen's County families that crossed paths with the Ashfield Gales in marriage and other personal matters, including William Fitzgerald, Anthony Sharp (grandson of noted Quaker Anthony Sharp), Martin Delany and Robert Flood. Following Mary Vicars' death, Anthony remarried Margaret Driscoll, formerly Margaret Tench.

Samuel's younger sons were Thomas, Henry and John. Based on Ireland land records, there is convincing circumstantial evidence that Samuel's son Thomas is Thomas Gale of Sampson's Court, Queen's County, Ireland. Thomas Gale died intestate in 1780 and was survived by at least one son, Anthony, who was the father of Marine Commandant Anthony Gale and Galway mayor Parnell Gale.

Betham lists two children of Anthony Gale, the third of the Gales of Ashfield who married Mary Vicars: Mary, who married James Fitzmaurice, and Peter, who succeeded to the estate at Ashfield. Peter Gale, a graduate of Trinity College, married Catherine Browne in 1758. Peter Gale was in turn succeeded by his son, Samuel Gale, also a graduate of Trinity College. Samuel married Susanna Brush.

Samuel's son, Peter, was the sixth and last of the Ashfield Gales. Peter Gale received both bachelor and masters degrees from Trinity College. Well educated, Peter authored a book concerning certain social conditions in Ireland. On 20 June 1837, Peter married Anna Maria Harriett Lynch. In addition to the estate at Ashfield, Peter owned a house in the City of Carlow, about five miles from Ashfield. In accordance with the Incumbered Estates (Ireland) Act 1849, Peter was forced to sell all of his real property on 11 November 1851, to cover debts which he attributed to the economic devastation caused by the Great Famine. Peter Gale died on 28 October 1857, and is buried in Monkstown Parish, County Cork.

== See also ==
- Adventurers' Act 1640
- Battle of the Boyne
- Cromwellian conquest of Ireland
- Great Famine (Ireland)
- Irish Confederate Wars
- Irish Rebellion of 1641
- Plantations of Ireland
- Protestant Ascendancy
- Williamite War in Ireland

== Bibliography ==
- Armytage, George (1897). The Register Book of Marriages Belonging to the Parish of St. George, Hanover Square, in the County of Middlesex, Volume 24. London: Mitchell & Hughes.
- Burke, Sir Bernard (1884). The General Armory of England, Scotland, Ireland, and Wales. London: Harrison & Sons.
- Burke, Sir Bernard (1864). Royal Descents and Pedigrees of Founders' Kin. London: Harrison and Sons.
- Burke, John (1847). A Genealogical and Heraldic Dictionary of the Landed Gentry of Great Britain & Ireland. London: Henry Colburn.
- Burtchaell, George Dames; Thomas Ulick Sadleir (1924). Alumni Databases: a register of the students, graduates, professors and provosts of Trinity College in the University of Dublin. London: Williams And Norgate.
- Carrigan, William (1905). The History and Antiquities of the Diocese of Ossory, Volume IV. Dublin: Sealy, Bryers & Walker.
- Falley, Margaret Dickson (1981). Irish and Scotch-Irish Ancestral Research: Repositories and Records. Baltimore: Genealogical Publishing Co.
- Gale, Peter (1834). An Inquiry into the Ancient Corporate System of Ireland, and Suggestions for its Immediate Restoration and General Extension. Dublin: R. Bentley.
- Madden, Richard Robert (1867). The History of Irish Periodical Literature: From the End of the 17th to the Middle of the 19th Century; Its Origin, Progress, and Results; with Notices of Remarkable Persons Connected with the Press in Ireland During the Past Two Centuries, Volume I. London: T.C. Newby.
- Manganiello, Stephen C. (2004). The Concise Encyclopedia of the Revolutions and Wars of England, Scotland, and Ireland, 1639–1660. Lanham, Maryland: Scarecrow Press.
- McNally, Michael (2005). Battle of the Boyne 1690: The Irish campaign for the English Crown. Oxford: Osprey Publishing.
- O'Hart, John (1884). The Irish And Anglo-Irish Landed Gentry, When Cromwell Came to Ireland. Dublin: M.H. McGill and Son.
- Perceval-Maxwell, M. (1994). The Outbreak of the Irish Rebellion of 1641. Quebec: McGill-Queen's Press.
- Smith, David Lawrence (1998). A History of the Modern British Isles, 1603–1707. Oxford: Wiley-Blackwell.
- Thoresby, Ralph (1816). Ducatus Leodiensis. Leeds, England: B. Demhirst.
