= Virginia v. Maryland =

- Supreme Court of the United States

Argued October 7, 2003 Decided December 9, 2003
- Full case name: Commonwealth of Virginia v. State of Maryland
- Citations: 540 U.S. 56 (more) 124 S. Ct. 598; 157 L. Ed. 2d 1226e

Holding
- Maryland has no authority to regulate or prohibit Virginia, its political subdivisions, or Virginia's residents from enjoying Virginia's riparian rights in the Potomac River. While Maryland owns the riverbed up to the low water mark of the Virginia shore, both states enjoy equal riparian rights.

Court membership
- Chief Justice William Rehnquist Associate Justices John P. Stevens · Sandra Day O'Connor; Antonin Scalia · Anthony Kennedy; David Souter · Clarence Thomas; Ruth Bader Ginsburg · Stephen Breyer

Case opinions
- Majority: Rehnquist, joined by O'Connor, Scalia, Souter, Thomas, Ginsburg, Breyer
- Dissent: Stevens, joined by Kennedy
- Dissent: Kennedy, joined by Stevens

Laws applied
- Article I, Section 10, Clause 3

Virginia v. Maryland, 540 U.S. 56 (2003), was a 2003 decision of the Supreme Court of the United States that settled a centuries long dispute between the Commonwealth of Virginia and the State of Maryland regarding Virginia's riparian rights to the Potomac River. The Court held in a 7–2 decision that Maryland did not have legal authority to regulate or prohibit Virginia and its citizens from building or improving structures on the river or drawing water from it.

== Background ==
The dispute between Virginia and Maryland over the water rights to the Potomac River dates back to at least the 18th century, and eventually led to the Mount Vernon Conference and the Compact of 1785. The Compact provided that citizens of both states would have navigation and commerce rights to the river, but, significantly, did not settle the boundary between them. Nearly a century of boundary disputes followed, until the two states submitted to binding arbitration in 1877. The "Black-Jenkins" arbitration award granted Maryland ownership of the riverbed, while recognizing Virginia's right to navigate the river, and set its boundary at the low-water mark along the Virginia shore.

Relative peace followed after the Black-Jenkins Award, with Maryland freely granting Virginia entities permits to draw water from the Potomac. However, the conflict flared up again in 1996, when Maryland refused to allow the Fairfax County Water Authority permission to create a new water intake facility, fearing urban sprawl on the Virginia side of the river. That refusal led to Virginia filing this case with the Supreme Court of the United States in 2000.

== Supreme Court decision ==
In a 7–2 decision, the Rehnquist Court ruled in favor of Virginia, with Chief Justice William Rehnquist writing the opinion. The Court decided that Virginia had full riparian rights to draw water from the river and to build and improve structures on it, and Maryland had no authority to regulate Virginia, its political subdivisions, or its citizens from exercising those rights. The decision drew heavily on the Maryland–Virginia Compact of 1785, which had given equal access to the water to both states.

Justices John Paul Stevens and Anthony Kennedy supported each others dissents from the majority opinion. The dissenting justices argued that both the Compact of 1785 and the arbitration clearly awarded ownership to Maryland, which carried sovereign regulatory authority.

== See also ==
- List of United States Supreme Court cases, volume 540
- List of United States Supreme Court cases
- Lists of United States Supreme Court cases by volume
- List of United States Supreme Court cases by the Rehnquist Court
