= Fairfax Arms =

Historic commercial building in Virginia, United States

- U.S. National Register of Historic Places
- Virginia Landmarks Register
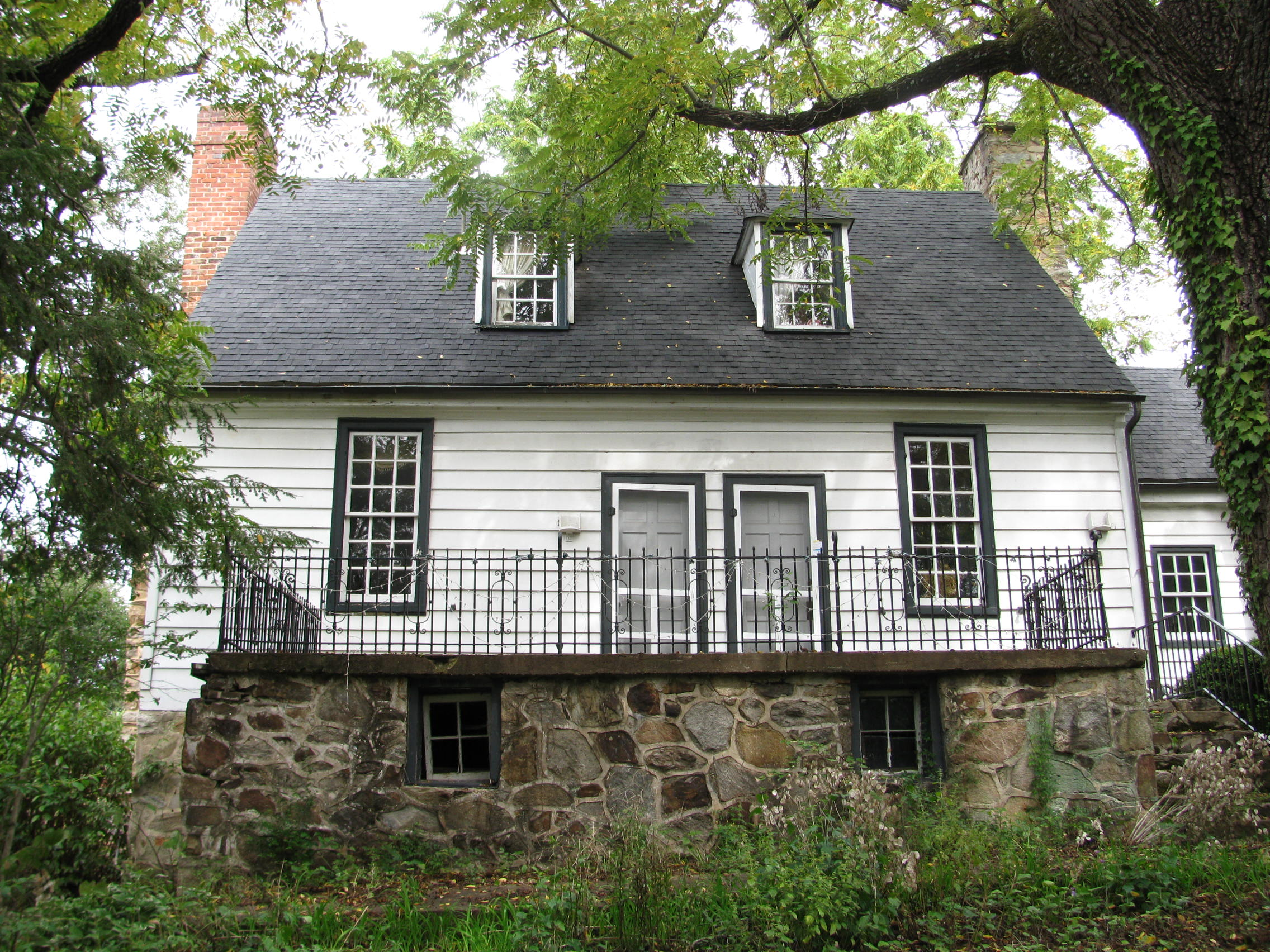
- The Fairfax Arms, seen in 2012

- Location within Northern Virginia Location within Virginia Location within the United States
- Location: 10712 Old Colchester Rd., Colchester, Virginia
- Coordinates: 38°40′7″N 77°14′8″W
- Area: 0.5 acres (0.20 ha)
- NRHP reference No.: 79003037
- VLR No.: 029-0043

Significant dates
- Added to NRHP: May 21, 1979
- Designated VLR: December 19, 1978

The Fairfax Arms, also known as the Colchester Inn, is a historic inn and tavern located at Colchester, Fairfax County, Virginia. It was built in the mid-18th century, and is a 1 1/2-story, three-bay, brick building measuring approximately 25 feet by 32 feet. It features flanking exterior stone chimneys and a gable roof with dormers.

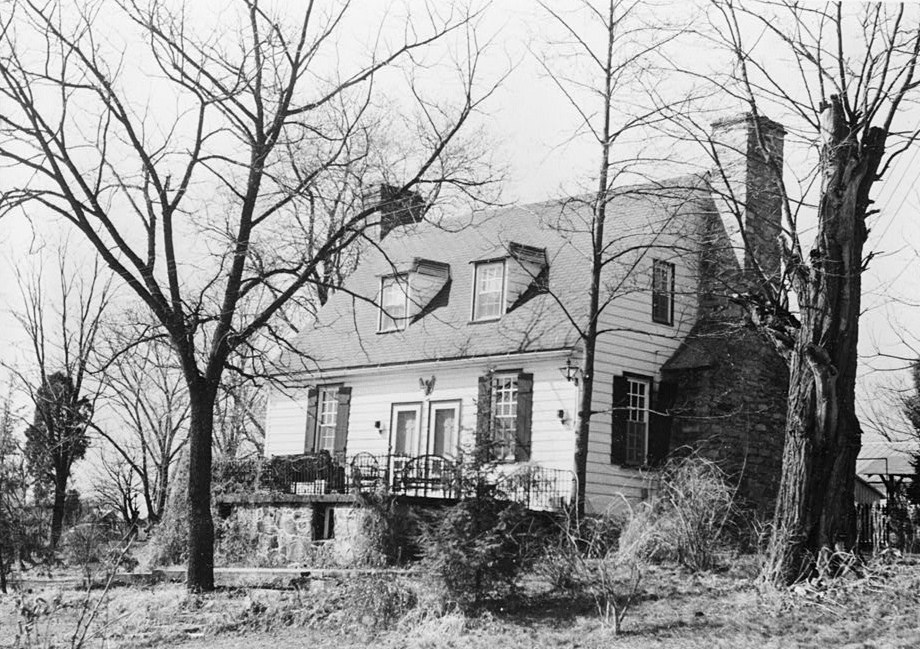
The house, then called the Colchester Inn, seen in 1959.

Long privately owned, the house was purchased by the Fairfax County Park Authority in 2021.

It was listed on the National Register of Historic Places in 1979.
