= Alexander Henderson (American politician) =

American politician

Virginia House of Delegates (Fairfax County)
- In office 1783–1784

Virginia House of Delegates (Prince William County)
- In office 1789–1790

Personal details
- Born: March 3, 1738 Glasgow, Scotland
- Died: November 22, 1815 (aged 77) Prince William, Virginia, US
- Spouse: Sarah Moore
- Children: Archibald Henderson
- Occupation: merchant and politician

Alexander Henderson (March 2, 1738 – November 22, 1815) was a merchant and politician in the British colony and American state of Virginia.

== Biography ==
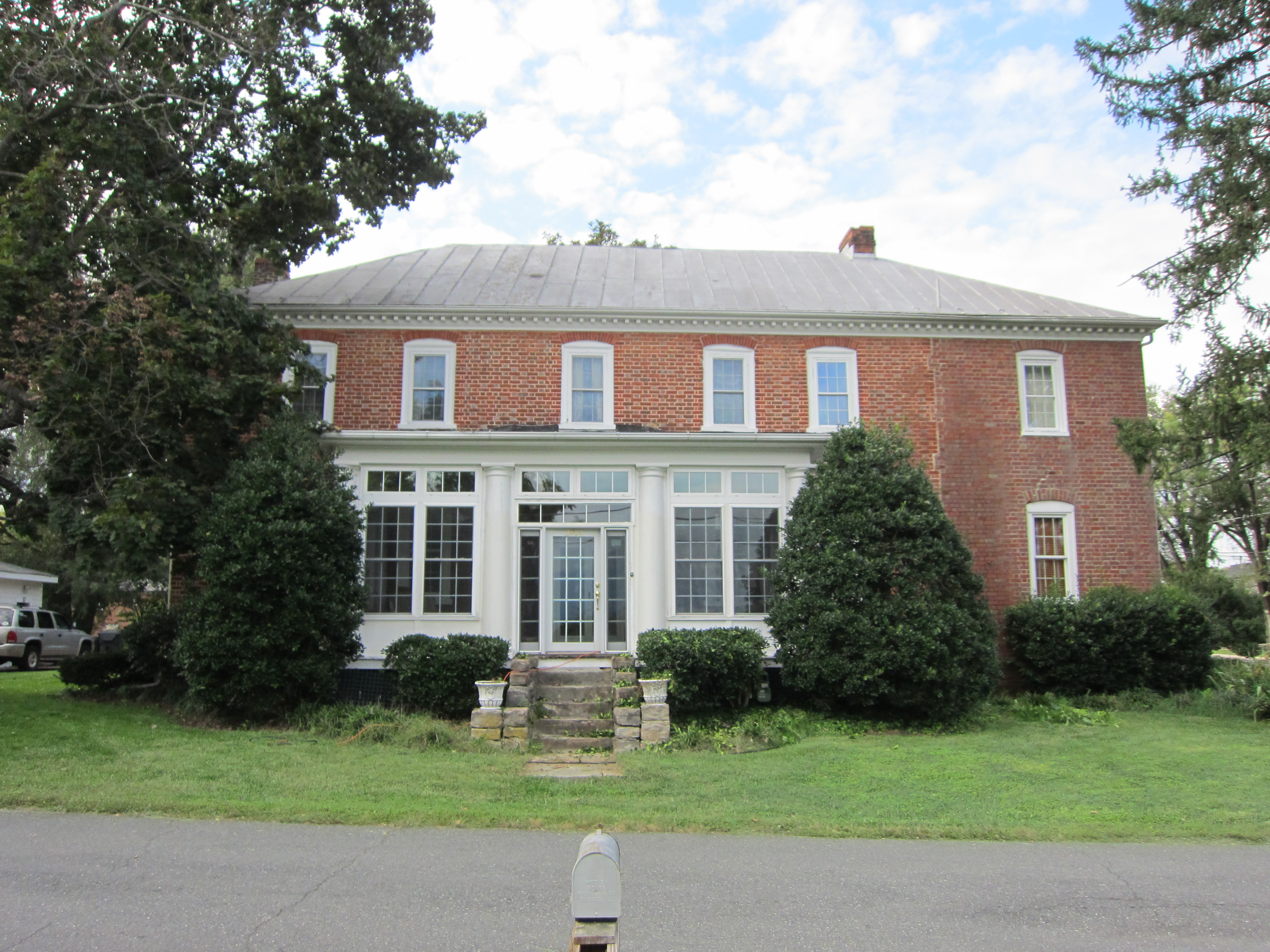
Henderson House, Dumfries, Virginia.

Henderson was born in Glasgow, Scotland. He married Sarah Moore c. 1769. He was the father of Archibald Henderson, the longest-serving Commandant of the United States Marine Corps, who served from 1820 to 1859. He moved to Colchester, Virginia, in 1756.

Henderson served in the Virginia militia during the American Revolution. He represented Fairfax County in the Virginia House of Delegates 1783–1784 and Prince William County 1789–1790.

He was a Virginia delegate to the Mount Vernon Conference in 1785 which led to the Constitutional Convention of 1787. He also served as a vestryman at Pohick Church and a magistrate of Fairfax and Prince William Counties.

Henderson moved to Dumfries, Virginia, in 1787, where his home, Henderson House still stands. There he opened a store with additional outlets later opening in Colchester, Occoquan, and Alexandria and leading him to be considered the "father of the American chain store."

== Death ==
Henderson died on November 22, 1815, in Prince William, Virginia. He was buried at the Henderson Cemetery.
