= Alaska Department of Environmental Conservation v. EPA =

- Supreme Court of the United States

Argued October 8, 2003 Decided January 21, 2004
- Full case name: Alaska Department of Environmental Conservation v. Environmental Protection Agency, et al.
- Citations: 540 U.S. 461 (more) 124 S. Ct. 983; 157 L. Ed. 2d 967

Case history
- Prior: Petition denied, 298 F.3d 814 (9th Cir. 2001); case suspended, 244 F.3d 748 (9th Cir. 2001); cert. granted, 537 U.S. 1186 (2003).

Court membership
- Chief Justice William Rehnquist Associate Justices John P. Stevens · Sandra Day O'Connor; Antonin Scalia · Anthony Kennedy; David Souter · Clarence Thomas; Ruth Bader Ginsburg · Stephen Breyer

Case opinions
- Majority: Ginsburg, joined by Stevens, O'Connor, Souter, Breyer
- Dissent: Kennedy, joined by Rehnquist, Scalia, Thomas

Laws applied
- Clean Air Act

Alaska Dept. of Environmental Conservation v. EPA, 540 U.S. 461 (2004), is a US Supreme Court case clarifying the scope of state environmental regulators and the Environmental Protection Agency (EPA). In a 5–4 decision, the Supreme Court found the EPA has authority to overrule state agency decisions under the Clean Air Act that a company is using the "best available controlling technology" to prevent pollution.

== Background ==
The Clean Air Act requires state agencies to determine optimal methods of preventing air quality degradation in areas that meet national clean air standards. The Act regulates air quality and establishes National Ambient Air Quality Standards in every state to prevent public health issues. The Act prohibits construction of major air polluting facilities that are not equipped with "the best available control technology" (BACT).

In 1998, Teck Cominco Alaska, requested a permit to build an additional generator and to modify an existing generator at its mines in order to expand zinc extraction. In May 1999, the Alaska Department of Environmental Conservation (ADEC) issued the permit, and a technical report concluded that "Low NOx" technology was BACT and identified "selective catalytic reduction" (SCR) as the best control technology. The EPA opposed the permit and objected that the ADEC had identified SCR as the best available control technology but failed to require it as BACT.

The ADEC issued a second report reinforcing the original findings but conceded the lack of cost data from Teck Cominco made it impossible to evaluate the impact of SCR on the mine's profitability. The EPA issued orders to ADEC under §§113(a)(5) and 167 of the Act that prohibited the ADEC from issuing permits to Teck Cominco without documenting why SCR was not BACT.

The ADEC appealed the EPA's orders to the Ninth Circuit Court of Appeals and argued that the EPA did not have the right to interfere with the state agency's decision. The Ninth Circuit sided with EPA, and ADEC appealed.

The Supreme Court granted certiorari to decide whether the Clean Air Act authorized the EPA block construction of a new major pollutant emitting facility permitted by a state environmental when the EPA finds the state environmental regulator's determination to be unreasonable, and what standard of review applies to such actions.

== Supreme Court ==
=== Majority opinion ===
The Supreme Court held in its majority opinion that the Clean Air Act authorized the EPA to bar the construction of the polluting facility in Alaska. The EPA correctly interpreted that the Clean Air Act gave the authority to review state authorities' BACT determinations.

Since the Act does not specify a standard for judicial review, the Supreme Court applied "the familiar default standard of the Administrative Procedure Act," of whether the EPA's action was "arbitrary, capricious, an abuse of discretion, or otherwise not in accordance with law." It found that although EPA's orders were explained with "less than ideal clarity," the EPA's comments and orders were not arbitrary, capricious, or an abuse of discretion.

=== Dissenting opinion ===
Justice Kennedy wrote a dissenting opinion, joined by Justices Rehnquist, Scalia, and Thomas, and found that Alaska's procedures were in full compliance with the Clean Air Act and the EPA's accompanying regulations that it promulgated. The EPA's action to overturn ADEC's decision was based on nothing more than its substantive disagreement with Alaska's discretionary judgment and exceeded its powers by setting aside Alaska's BACT determination.

== See also ==
- Clean Air Act
- Environmental Protection Agency
