= Asa Blanchard =

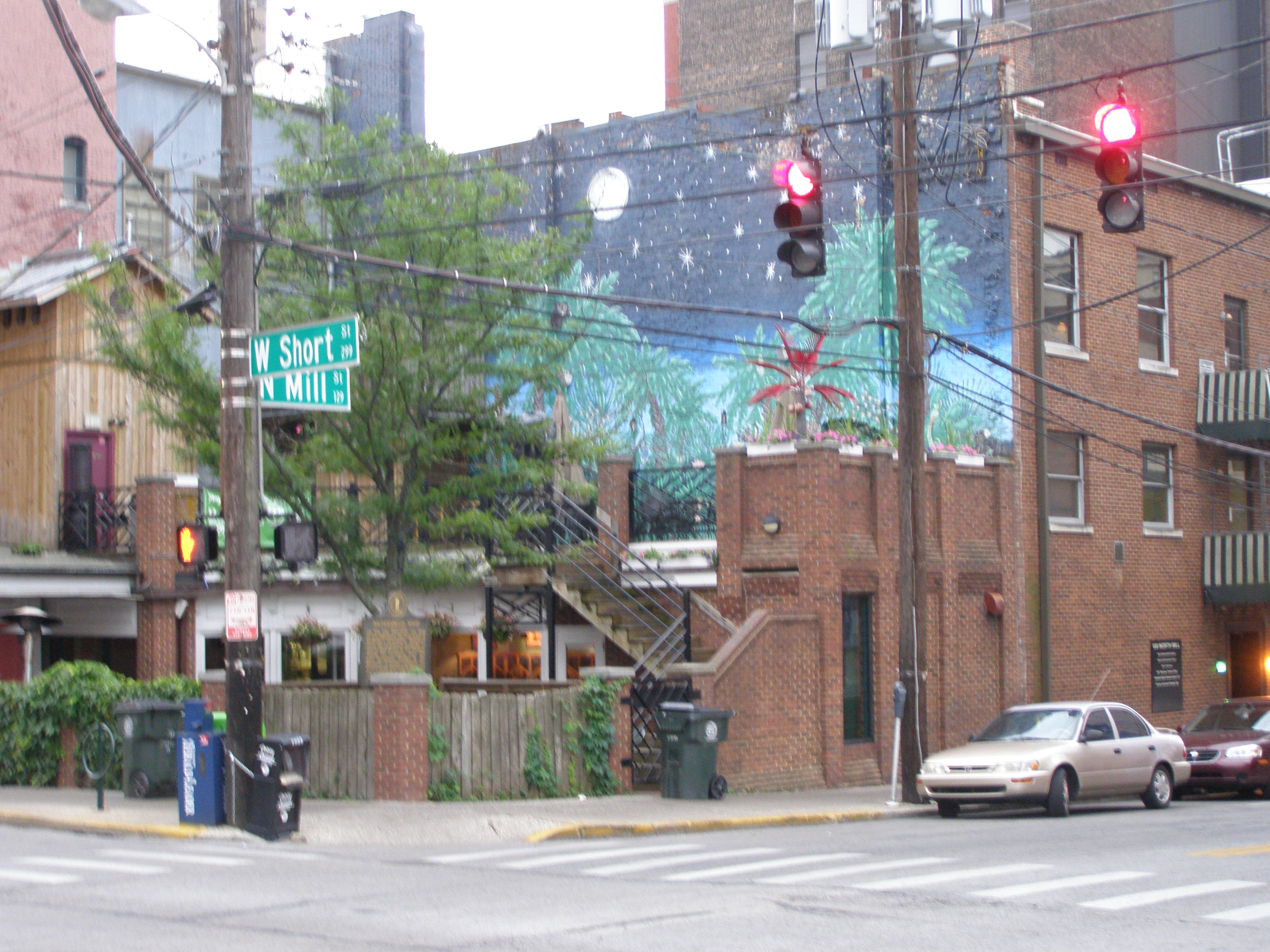
The shop of Asa Blanchard was located on this site from 1810 to 1838.

Asa Blanchard (c. 1770 or 1787 - September 15, 1838) was an American silversmith and clockmaker active in Lexington, Kentucky, sometimes described as early Kentucky's most prolific and successful silversmith. His surname was variously spelled "Blanset(t)", "Blancet(t)", "Blanchet", "Blanchit", or "Blanchard", often within one document.

== Biography ==
Blanchard is believed to have been born Asa Blansett, circa 1770, in Dumfries, Virginia, and to have worked in Dumfries from about 1789–1806, using touchmarks of "A•B", "AB", and "A•BLANSETT". At some time before moving to Kentucky, he may have worked in New York and Philadelphia, a claim he made in his first Lexington advertisement in the "Kentucky Gazette and General Advertiser" of 28 December 28, 1807. (No documentation has been found to support this claim.)

In 1806 he moved to Lexington, and began using marks with variations of "BLANCHARD" and "A•BLANCHARD". The first record of Blanchard in Kentucky is the Fayette County Order Book II of May 9, 1808, which states that "William Grant... be bound apprentice to Asa Blanchard." On June 30, 1809, Blanchard bought a lot on Mill Street in Lexington; the next year he bought a lot for his shop on the intersection of Mill and Short Streets. His advertisement in the Reporter of March 1816 lists "a large assortment of gold and silver work". He was married to Rebecca, before 1818, and after she died to the widow Hester Harris on March 7, 1838.

Over the next 32 years, Asa Blanchard worked in Lexington. When he died, his estate was valued at $40,000.
