= Henderson House (Dumfries, Virginia) =

Coordinates: 38.5677°N 77.3289°W

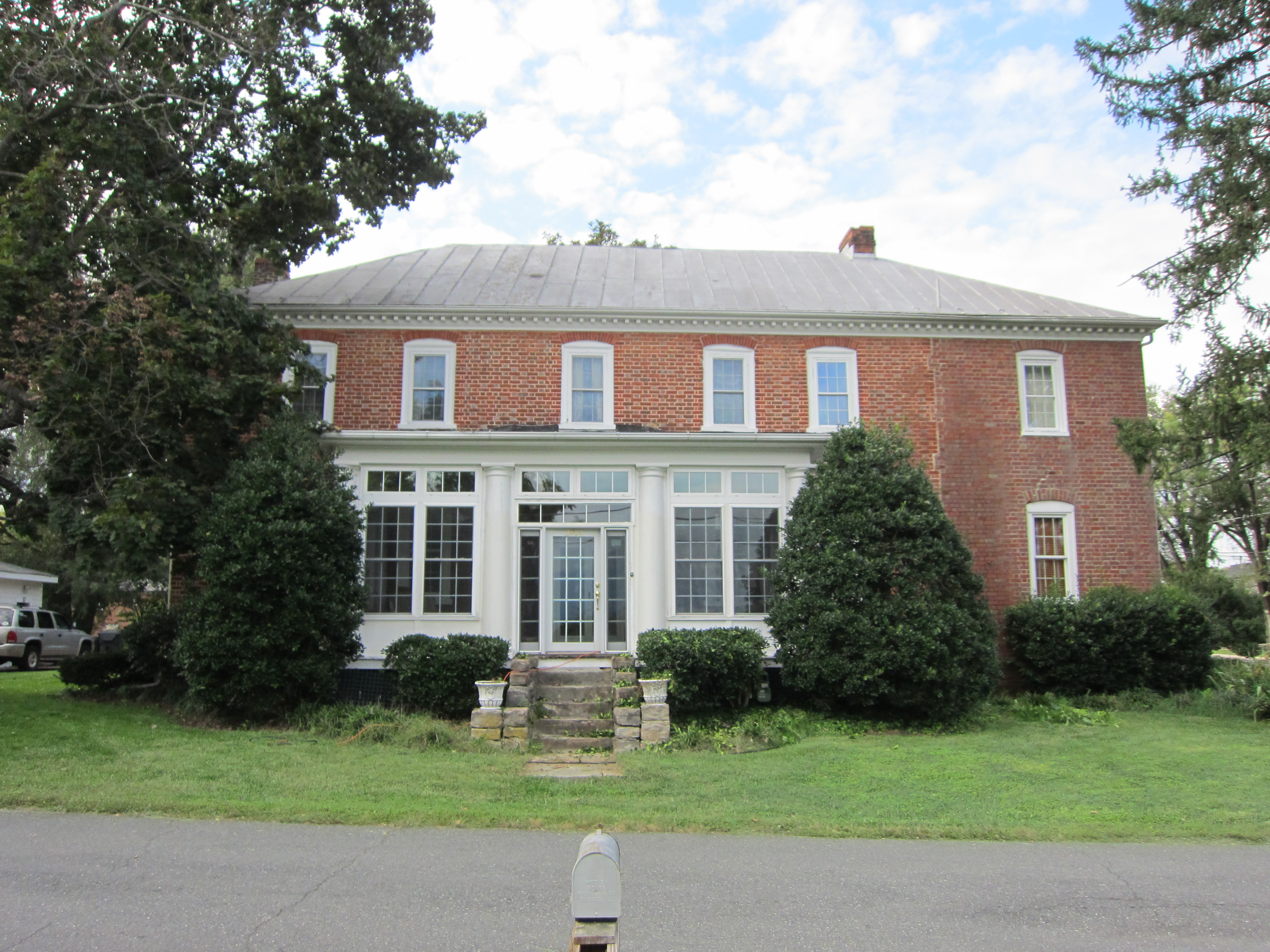
- Interactive map of the Henderson House area

General information
- Type: Brick house
- Location: 3904 Fairfax Street; Dumfries, Virginia
- Construction started: Late 18th century
- Governing body: Privately owned

Technical details
- Floor count: 2

The Henderson House is a historic U.S. home located in Dumfries, Virginia. Alexander Henderson built this home in the late 18th century near the Old Post Road (King's Highway). Alexander Henderson was the father of Archibald Henderson, fifth Commandant of the Marine Corps. During the American Revolutionary War, the Hendersons entertained many important officers and men in this house. During the American Civil War, both the Confederate and the Union armies used the house as a hospital depending on which occupied the area. A cannonball struck the house during the American Civil War and remained lodged in the west wall for about 100 years until a souvenir hunter stole it in the 1960s.

== Henderson ==
Henderson lived in this house until his death and the house was sold in 1817 shortly after the death of his wife Sally.
