= Dumfries Cemetery =

Historic cemetery in Dumfries, Virginia

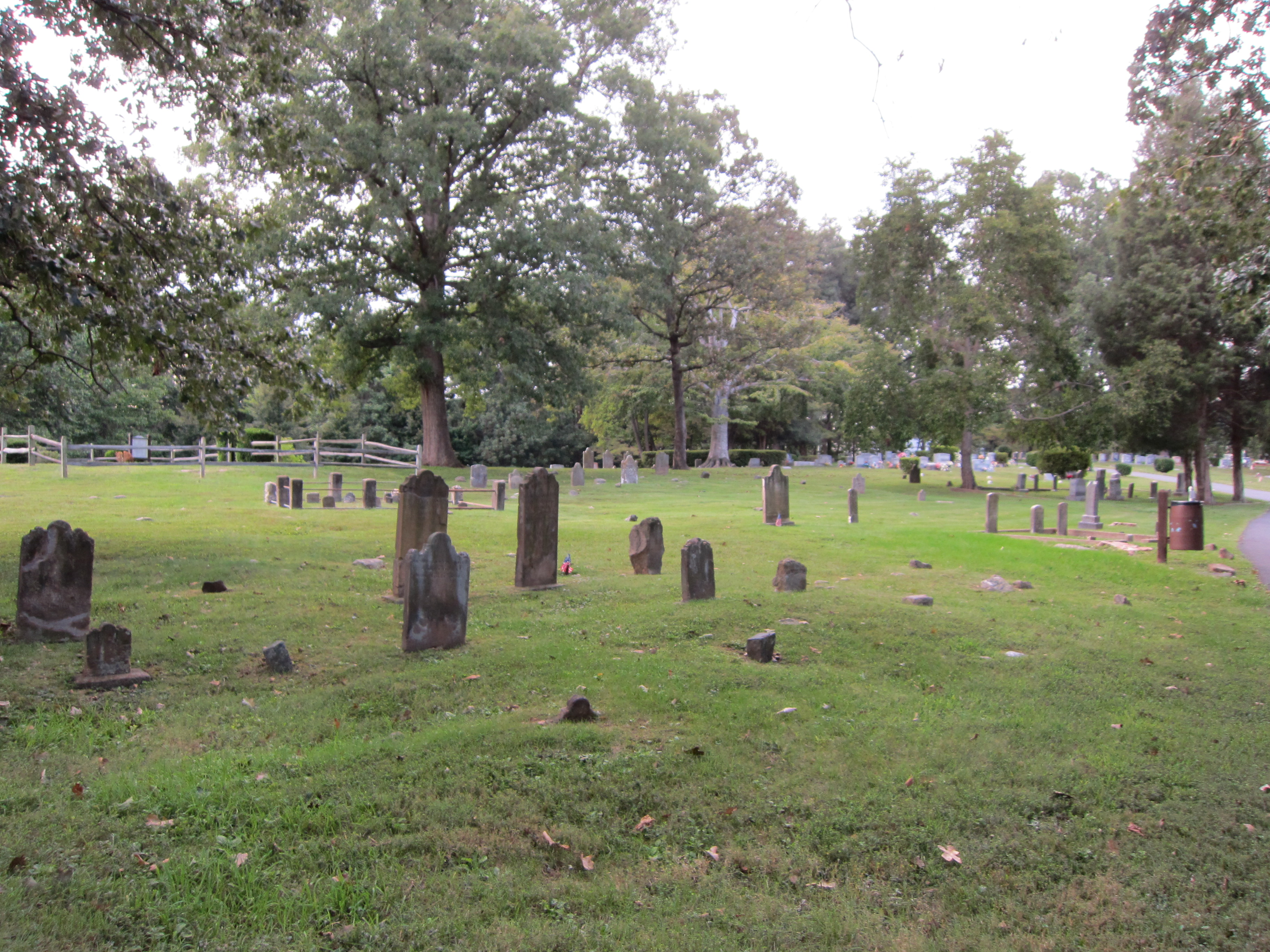
- Dumfries Cemetery
- Interactive map of Dumfries Cemetery

Details
- Location: Dumfries, Virginia
- Country: United States
- Coordinates: 38°34′06.97″N 77°19′59.60″W
- Find a Grave: Dumfries Cemetery

The Dumfries Cemetery is a historic cemetery in Dumfries, Prince William County, Virginia. It is located on Mine Road near Cameron Street. The cemetery includes graves of original pioneers of Dumfries from 1667. It also contains unmarked graves from the Civil War.

== Quantico Church ==
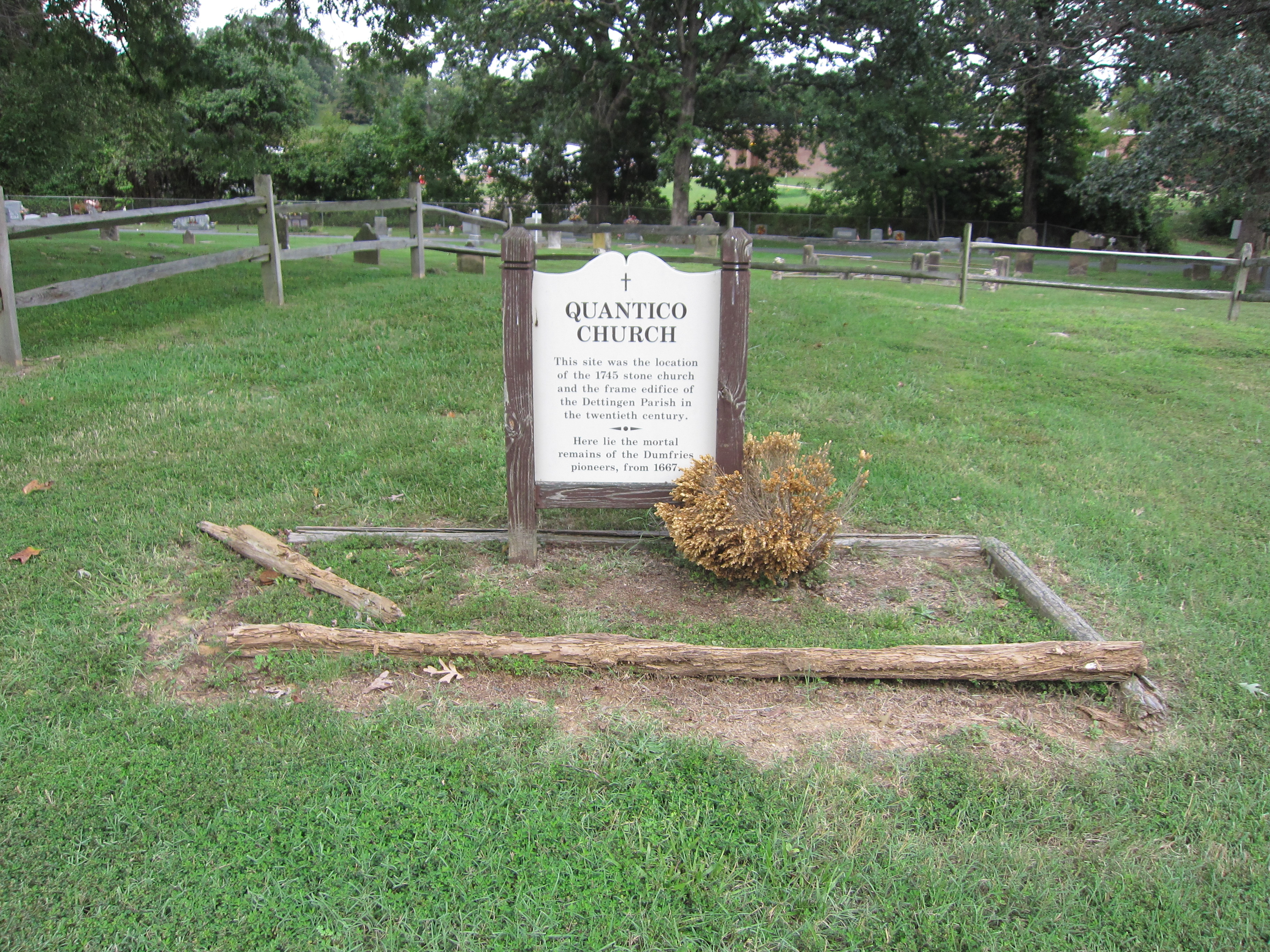
Site of Quantico Church on the ground of the Dumfries Cemetery

The remains of the Quantico Church are located at the Dumfries Cemetery. The Quantico Church was built in 1745 of stone.
