= Old Hotel (Dumfries, Virginia) =

Historic commercial building in Virginia, United States

- U.S. National Register of Historic Places
- Virginia Landmarks Register
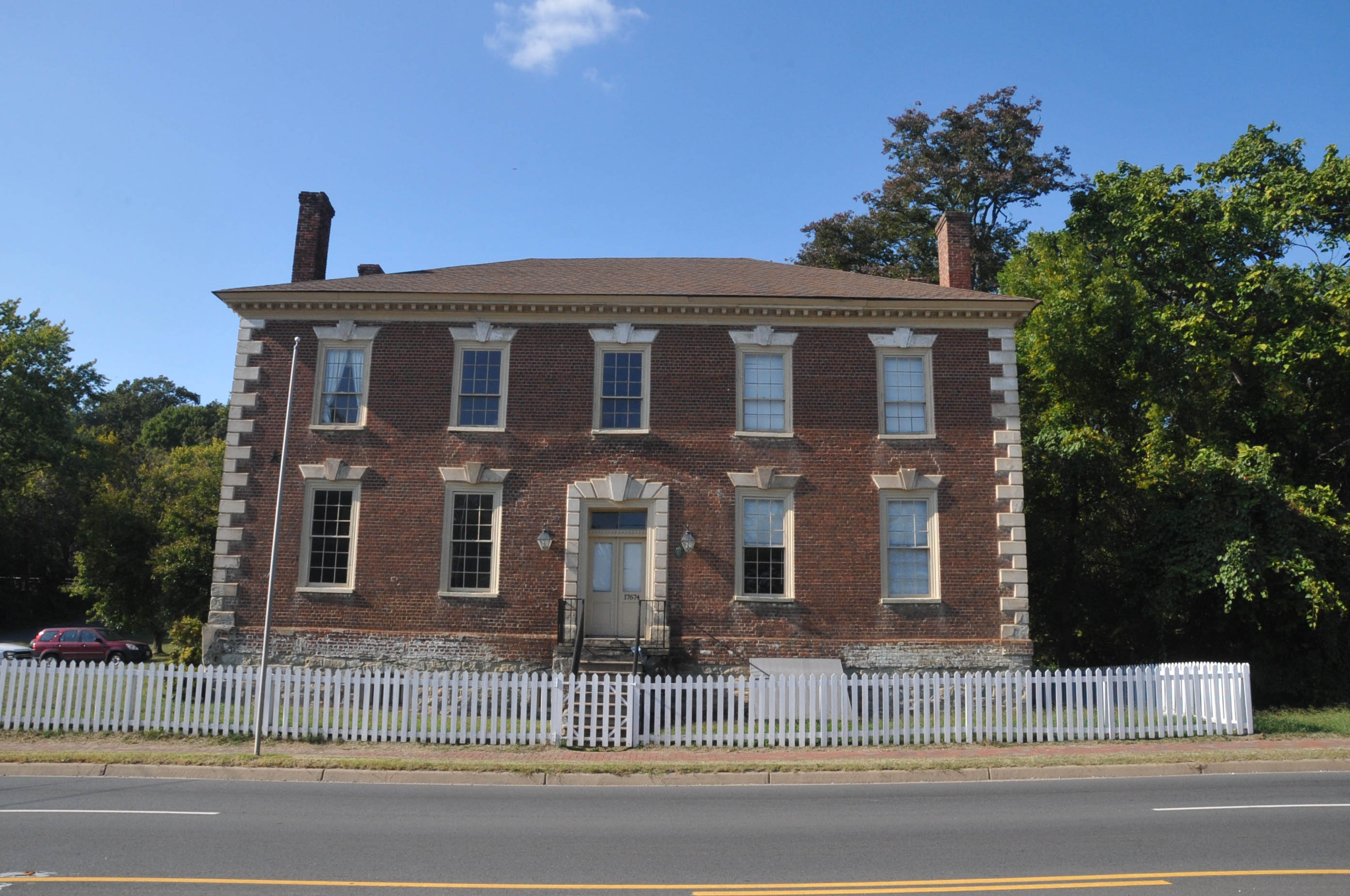
- Old Hotel, March 2007

- Location within Northern Virginia Location within Virginia Location within the United States
- Location: U.S. 1, Dumfries, Virginia
- Coordinates: 38°34′7″N 77°19′27″W
- Area: 0 acres (0 ha)
- Architectural style: Georgian
- NRHP reference No.: 69000273
- VLR No.: 212-0001

Significant dates
- Added to NRHP: November 12, 1969
- Designated VLR: May 13, 1969

Old Hotel, also known as Williams Ordinary and Love's Tavern, is a historic inn and tavern located in Dumfries, Virginia.

== History ==
It is dated to about 1765, and is a two-story, five-bay, Georgian style brick building. It features stone quoins and a stone doorway. The building has a fully molded wood cornice with modillions, hipped roof, and four interior end chimneys.

In the fall of 2016, new evidence emerged from dendrochronology testing by the Oxford Tree Ring Laboratory in Baltimore that the building may not be as old as previously thought. The dendrochronology testing, which examines the wood in the building, reveals the structure may date to 1786–87, just before George Washington took office. The building, one of the oldest in Prince William County, is currently used by the county for its Historic Preservation offices.

It was listed on the National Register of Historic Places in 1969.
