= Archibald Henderson =

United States Marine Corps Commandant

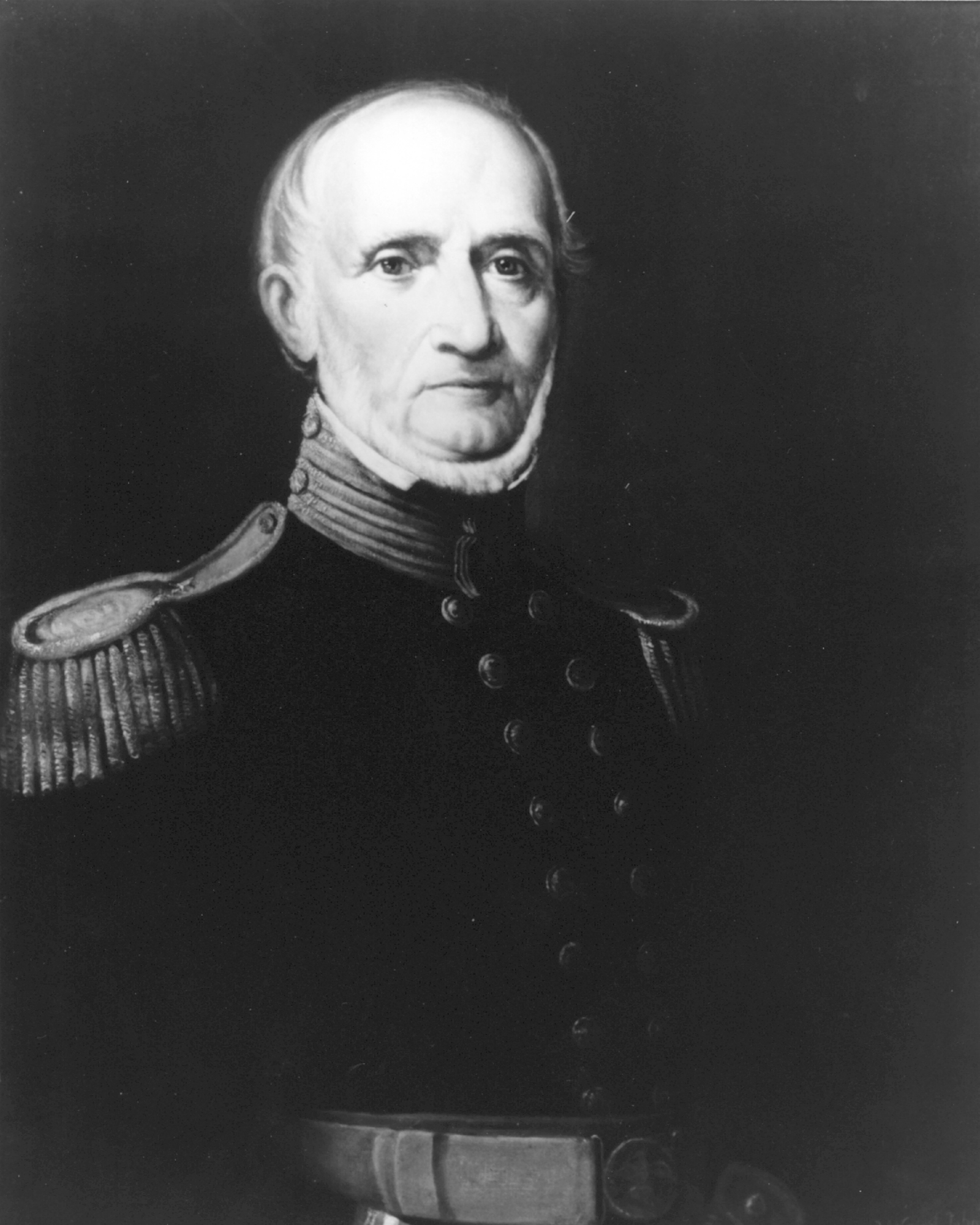
- 5th Commandant of the Marine Corps (1820–1859)
- Born: January 21, 1783; Colchester, Fairfax County, Virginia, U.S.
- Died: January 6, 1859 (aged 75); Washington, D.C., U.S.
- Burial place: Congressional Cemetery
- Military career
- Allegiance: United States of America
- Branch: United States Marine Corps
- Service years: 1806–1859
- Rank: Colonel (Brevet Brigadier General)
- Nickname: "Grand old man of the Marine Corps"
- Commands: Commandant of the Marine Corps
- Conflicts: War of 1812; Indian wars

Archibald Henderson (January 21, 1783 – January 6, 1859) was the longest-serving Commandant of the Marine Corps, serving from 1820 to 1859. His name is learned by all recruits at Marine recruit training (Boot Camp) as the "Grand old man of the Marine Corps," serving in the United States Marine Corps for over 52 years.

== Early life ==
Born in Colchester, Fairfax County, Virginia, Henderson was one of six sons of successful merchant Alexander Henderson and Sarah (Sally) Moore. He was raised at the Henderson House in Dumfries, Virginia until he joined the Marine Corps at the age of 18.

== Career ==
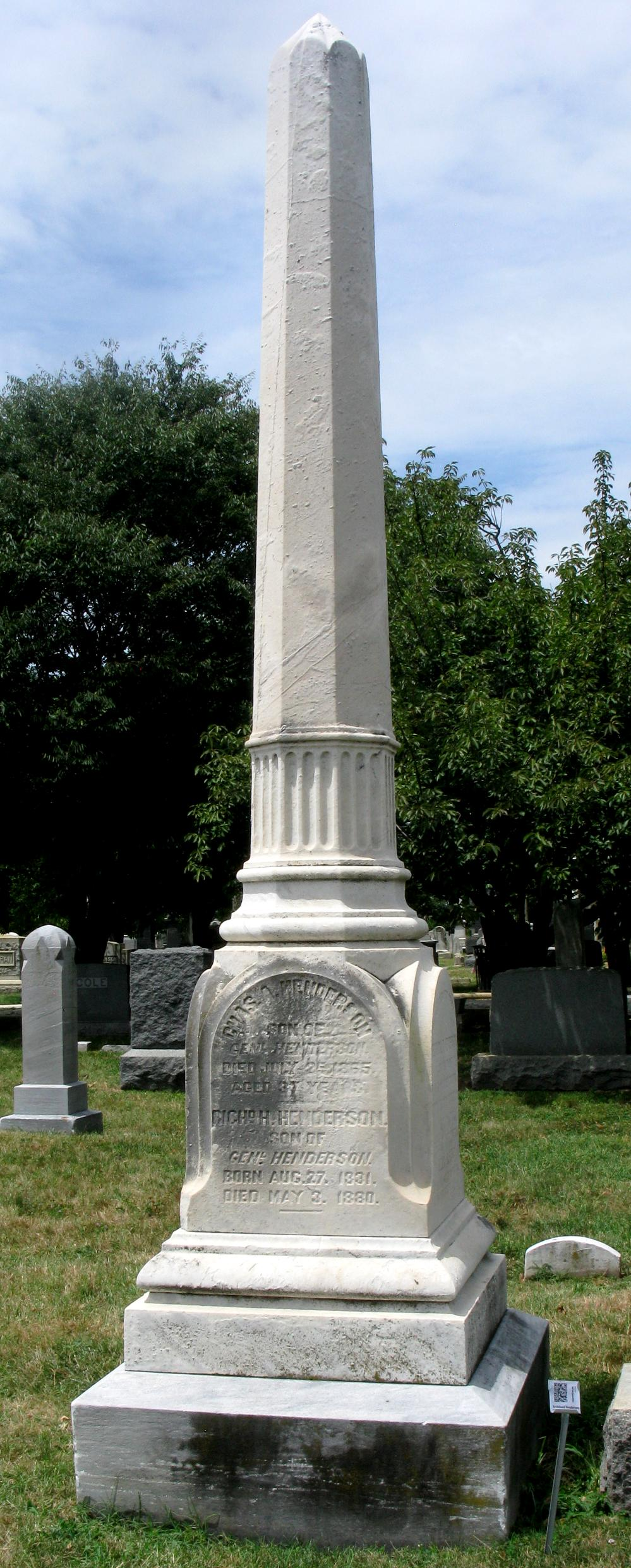
The Henderson family monument in the Congressional cemetery, Washington DC

Archibald Henderson was commissioned a second lieutenant in the Marine Corps on 4 June 1806 and served aboard USS Constitution during her famous victories in the War of 1812. He participated in several shipboard engagements and was decorated for bravery. He was brevetted a major in 1814.

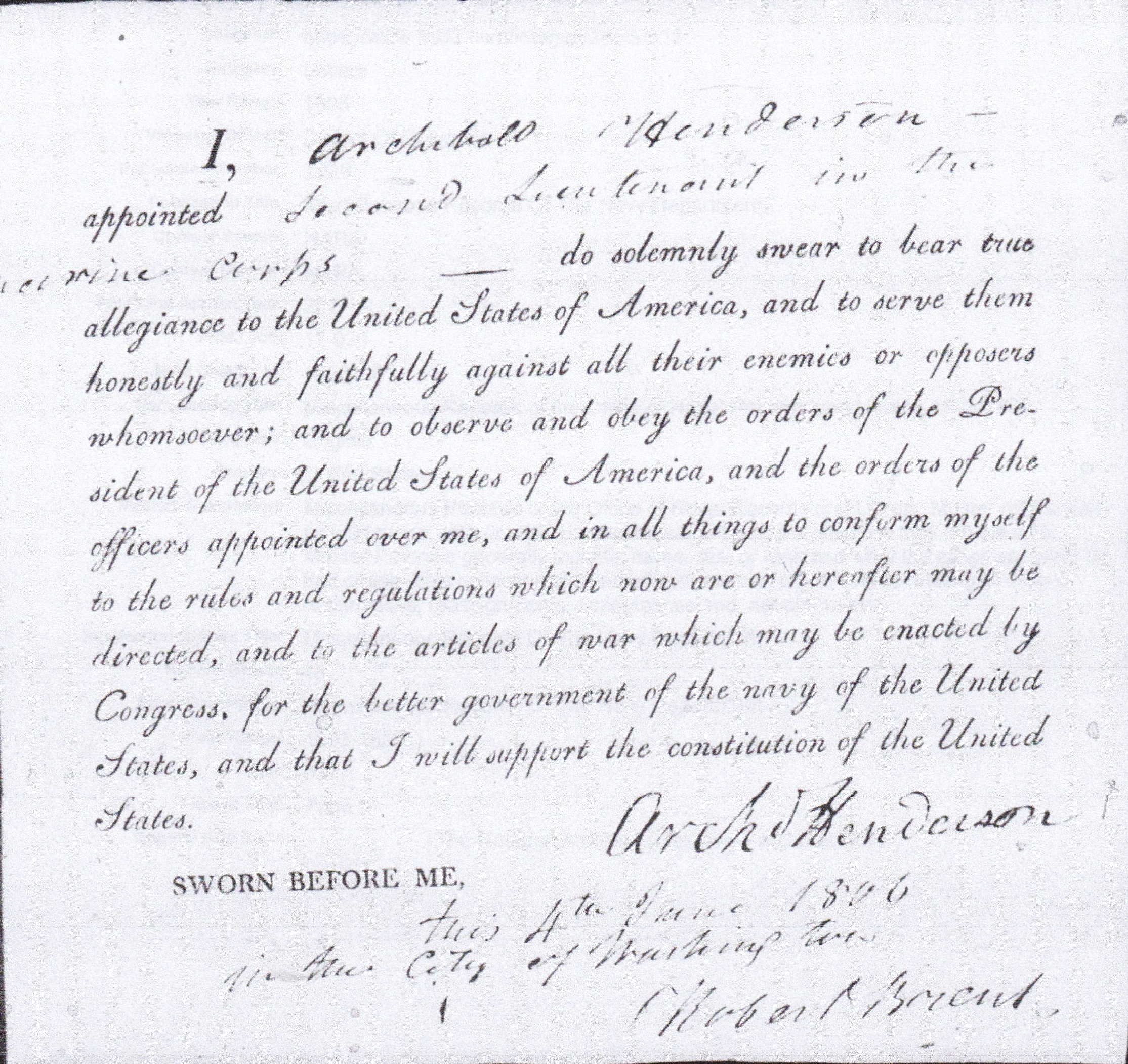
Oath of Allegiance, signed by 2nd Lt Archibald Henderson, USMC on 4 June 1806

From 16 September 1818 to 2 March 1819, Henderson was the acting Commandant. On 17 October 1820, at age 37, Lt. Colonel Henderson was appointed the Commandant of the Marine Corps. He served for a little over 38 years, the longest of any officer to hold that position.

Henderson is credited with thwarting attempts by President Andrew Jackson to combine the Marine Corps with the Army in 1829. Instead, Congress passed the Act for the Better Organization of the Marine Corps in 1834, ensuring the Marines would remain part of the United States Department of the Navy. He was promoted to colonel the same year.

He went into the field as Commandant during the Indian campaigns in Florida and Georgia during 1836 and 1837, and was promoted brevet brigadier general in 1843 for his actions in these campaigns. Tradition says that he pinned a note to his door: "Gone to Florida to fight the Indians. Will be back when the war is over."

Marines also served in the Mexican–American War during Henderson's tenure as Commandant. The sword presented to him at the war's end was inscribed, "From the Halls of Montezuma, to the Shores of Tripoli", giving the opening words to the Marines' Hymn.

Archibald Henderson died suddenly on 6 January 1859. He was buried in the Congressional Cemetery. According to Marine lore, the Colonel Commandant had attempted to will his home—actually government-provided quarters in which he had lived for 38 years—to his heirs, having forgotten that they were government owned.

== Legacy ==
USS Henderson (AP-1), and Henderson Hall Barracks were named for him.

== Promotions ==
- Second Lieutenant – 4 June 1806
- First Lieutenant – 6 March 1807
- Captain – 1 April 1811
- Brevet Major – 1814
- Lieutenant Colonel Commandant – 17 October 1820
- Colonel Commandant – 1 July 1834
- Brevet Brigadier General – 27 January 1837

== See also ==
- Commandant of the Marine Corps
- List of historic United States Marines

== Notes ==
Military offices
Preceded by Lt. Col. Franklin Wharton	Commandant of the United States Marine Corps (acting); 1818–1819	Succeeded by Lt. Col. Anthony Gale
Preceded by Lt. Col. Anthony Gale	Commandant of the United States Marine Corps; 1820–1859	Succeeded by Col. John Harris
