= Anthony Gale =

Fourth Commandant of the Marine Corps

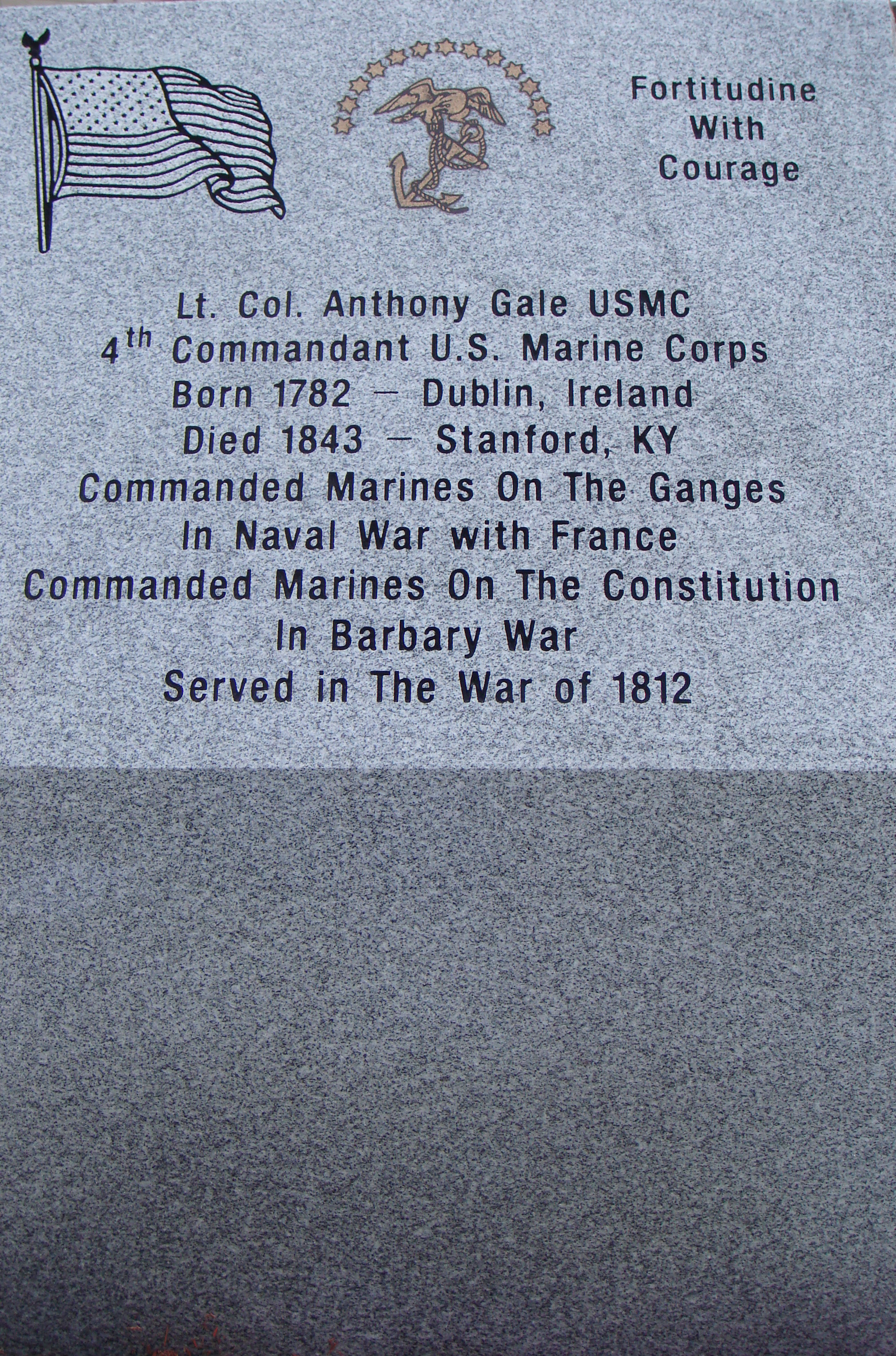
- Anthony Gale Memorial, Lincoln County Courthouse, Stanford, Kentucky
- Born: Ireland
- Died: December 12, 1843; Stanford, Kentucky, U.S.
- Spouse: Catherine Swope (m. 1800)
- Military career
- Allegiance: United States
- Branch: United States Marine Corps
- Service years: 1798–1820 (Dismissed from Service)
- Rank: Lieutenant Colonel
- Commands: Commandant of the Marine Corps
- Conflicts: Quasi-War of 1798–1800; First Barbary War of 1801–1805; War of 1812

Anthony Gale (died December 12, 1843) was an Irish–American military officer who served as the fourth Commandant of the United States Marine Corps and is known as being the only one ever fired. Fewer records survive concerning him than any other commandant. He is the only commandant for whom the Marines neither know his burial location nor have a portrait or likeness.

== Early life ==
His date of birth is in dispute. It is variously reported to be in 1761 or on September 17, 1782, in Dublin, Ireland. He was commissioned as a second lieutenant on July 26, 1798. According to a transcript of an October 23, 1838 letter to President Martin Van Buren, Anthony Gale writes (in part): "as a military man that I embraced in my nineteenth year", which would place his birth in 1779–1780.

Born in Ireland to Anthony Gale and Ann Delany, Gale declared his intent to become a United States citizen on June 15, 1798, and completed the naturalization process on November 27, 1801. Irish land records involving his mother Ann Delany suggest Gale was born in Queen's County, Ireland, subsequently renamed County Laois.

Gale married Catherine Swope on January 4, 1800, in Cumberland County, Pennsylvania. The couple settled in Philadelphia and had three children – Amelia, who died after four weeks; a son, Washington Anthony; and another daughter, Emily, both of whom survived into adulthood.

== Early career ==
Early in his Marine career, he fought, in fairly quick succession, the French, the Barbary pirates, the British, and a U.S. naval officer. Angered by the mistreatment of a Marine sentry while serving on the USS Ganges, Gale killed Navy Lieutenant Allen MacKenzie in a duel. This incident, perceived to be an affront to the Corps, subsequently brought Commandant William W. Burrows' approval for Gale's defense of his Corps' honor. Later in his military career, Gale took "an active and gallant part" during the siege of Fort McHenry in the War of 1812.

Increasing rank brought other difficulties. In 1815, while commanding at Philadelphia, he fell out with Commandant Franklin Wharton over construction of barracks. Wharton had been accused of overspending on the project, and he in turn charged Gale with building extravagant officers' quarters. Gale asserted that he had been given no specific plans and that Wharton had known what was being done. A court of inquiry cleared Gale, but he was banished to a less desirable post in New Orleans, where he allegedly nursed a feeling of persecution and began to drink heavily.

== Rise to Commandant ==
Brevet Major Gale, although next senior at the time of Wharton's death on September 1, 1818, had to battle for the job. At the time, the Corps was authorized only one lieutenant colonel and two majors. One could only rise in rank by virtue of the death or removal of a superior officer. When Wharton died, a scramble for the Commandant's job ensued.

Major Samuel Miller, the adjutant and inspector at the Marine Corps Headquarters, two days after notifying Navy Secretary Benjamin Williams Crowninshield of Wharton's death, considering himself well suited for the job, suggested that he conduct the affairs of the commandancy until a successor was appointed. Brevet Major Archibald Henderson asserted that as the senior line officer present, he should be Acting Commandant. Henderson was also characteristically blunt in giving his assessment of Gale's qualifications to the new Secretary of the Navy, Smith Thompson. In an attempt to discredit Gale, in February 1819, Henderson and Miller participated in a court of inquiry resurrecting the old charges concerning Gale's tenure in Philadelphia. However, during his testimony, Henderson was forced to admit that his knowledge of Gale's misconduct was based on hearsay. Miller could similarly not provide firsthand evidence of wrongdoing by Gale. After the court of inquiry exonerated him of these charges for the second time, Gale, with 21 years of service and therefore senior, became Lieutenant Colonel Commandant on March 3, 1819, ending a six-month period during which the Corps had been leaderless.

== Trouble as Commandant ==
Shortly after Gale assumed his post, Archibald Henderson circumvented Gale and wrote directly to Navy Secretary Smith Thompson requesting to join General Andrew Jackson who was serving as military governor in Florida. Soon came more direct troubles with Smith Thompson, who frequently countermanded Gale's orders. Finally, on August 8, 1820, Gale submitted a letter analyzing the proper division of function between himself and the Secretary, pointing out the impossibility of his position. It was also alleged that he began to drink heavily at this time. Eight days after his letter, Gale was notified that the Secretary had unilaterally granted a four-week leave to one Marine captain and had suspended Gale's order sending another captain to the Mediterranean. Two weeks after that, on August 29, Gale was arrested and ordered to face court-martial.

== Court-martial ==
The charges against Gale were dated September 11, 1820. The first was that Gale was publicly intoxicated in the city of Washington on six specified dates during August, including August 31, two days after his arrest. The second charge was of conduct unbecoming an officer and a gentleman. There were three specifications: first, that Gale had visited a house of prostitution near the Marine Barracks "in open and disgraceful manner" on that same August 31; second, that he had on September 1 - a date on which he was in custody - called Lieutenant Richard M. Desha, the Corps' Paymaster and son of Congressman Joseph Desha of Kentucky - who had earlier charged Gale with misappropriation - "a damned rascal, liar and coward" and threatening him with personal chastisement unless he would immediately challenge and fight him; and, finally, that he had declared in front of the Marine Barracks "that he did not care a damn for the President, Jesus Christ or God Almighty!" The third charge was that Gale had signed a false certificate that said he had not used a Marine for personal services when in fact he had had a man assigned as waiter and coachman from October 17, 1819, until June 3, 1820. The fourth and final charge was that Gale had broken arrest "at sundry times" between September 1 and 8 while he was confined to quarters.

Gale's court-martial was marked by further irregularities. Major Miller, one of Gale's rivals for the post of Commandant, despite having written the charges against Gale, was nonetheless appointed the prosecutor. Furthermore, Lieutenant Desha, a witness against Gale on the second charge, was appointed a supernumerary (or extra member) of the court, and was called to sit on the court in judgment of Gale when regular court members failed to appear. Desha objected to serving on the court under the circumstances, but the court overruled his objection on the grounds that Desha, not Gale, had objected. The court found Gale guilty, President James Monroe approved the verdict, and Gale was removed from office and dismissed from the Marine Corps on October 18, 1820.

== Later life ==
From Washington, Gale went first to Philadelphia where he spent several months in a hospital, then took up residence in Stanford, Kentucky. Armed with proof that he had been under the strain of temporary mental derangement while Commandant, he spent fifteen years attempting to have his court-martial decision reversed. Eventually, in 1835, the government partially cleared him and awarded him a stipend of $15 a month, which was later increased to $25 and continued until his death.

Although some sources identify he died on December 12, 1842, most sources, including the April 1844 pension petition filed by his widow, report his death to be on December 12, 1843. Over the years, several efforts have been undertaken by the Marines in an attempt to locate Commandant Gale's final resting place. All have proven unsuccessful. In lieu of a monument at his gravesite, on March 6, 2010, various detachments of the Marine Corps League of Kentucky dedicated a monument to Commandant Anthony Gale at the Lincoln County Courthouse in Stanford, Kentucky, near where he died and is likely buried. The Marine Corps League, Department of Kentucky, has taken, as an annual project, the traditional laying of the Commandant's wreath at this memorial on each November 10, the birthday of the Marines, in accordance with Chapter 6 of Marine Corps Order 3040.4.

== See also ==
- Commandant of the Marine Corps
- Ashfield Gales

== Bibliography ==
- "A Colorful Commandant" (PDF). Kettle Moraine Marine. December 2006. Archived from the original (PDF) on March 4, 2016.
- Abbot, Willis John (1918). Soldiers of the Sea. New York: Dodd, Mead and Company. p. 79. "captain anthony gale."
- Bartlett, Merrill LtCol. USMC (Ret.) (June 1985). "Court-Martial of a Commandant, The Story of Lieutenant Colonel Anthony Gale, Fourth Commandant of the Marine Corps". Proceedings Magazine.
- Jordan, Robert (March 2007). "The Mystery of Lieutenant Colonel Commandant Anthony Gale". Leatherneck Magazine.
- Millett, Allan Reed; Jack Shulimson (2004). Commandants of the Marine Corps. Annapolis: Naval Institute Press. pp. 45–53. ISBN 0-87021-012-2.
- Moskin, J. Robert (1977). The U.S. Marine Corps Story. New York: McGraw-Hill. ISBN 0-07-043453-0.
- Nofi, Albert A. (1997). The Marine Corps Book of Lists. Cambridge, Massachusetts: Da Capo Press. ISBN 0-938289-89-6.
- Schuon, Karl (1963). U. S. Marine Corps Biographical Dictionary. New York: Franklin Watts, Inc. "anthony gale."

Military offices
Preceded by BvtMaj Archibald Henderson (acting)	Commandant of the United States Marine Corps; 1819–1820	Succeeded by Col Archibald Henderson
