= Gerald Fitzgerald, 3rd Lord Decies =

Sir Gerald Fitzgerald, 3rd Lord Decies was the son of John Fitzgerald and Ellen, daughter of Maurice FitzGibbon, the White Knight.

The Decies property was originally a part of the Desmond estate until James, the 8th Earl of Desmond, bequeathed to his younger son, Gerald, Decies and Dromana Castle.

John Fitzgerald died at Dromany on 18 December 1524, when his son and heir Gerald Fitzgerald entered into possession of the premises. Gerald Fitzgerald, 3rd Lord Decies, died at Templemichael, 25 February 1553, and was succeeded by his son and heir, Maurice, first Viscount Decies.

Sir Gerald Fitzgerald married Ellice, daughter of Piers Butler, 8th Earl of Ormond and had issue:

- Sir Maurice Fitzgerald
- Sir James Fitzgerald
- Gerald Fitzgerald
- Mary, who married Sir Oliver Grace

== Ancestry ==
Ancestors of Gerald Fitzgerald, 3rd Lord Decies

Gerald FitzMaurice, 4th Earl Desmond
James FitzGerald, 7th Earl Desmond
Eleanor Butler
Gerald FitzGerald, 1st Lord Decies
Ulick FitzRickard Burke
Mary Burke
John FitzGerald, 2nd Lord Decies
MacRichard Burke
Margaret Burke
Gerald Fitzgerald, 3rd Lord Decies
Maurice Fitzgibbon, the White Knight
Ellen Fitzgibbon

== See also ==
- Ashfield Gales

== Bibliography ==
- Burke, Sir Bernard (1866). A Genealogical History of the Dormant, Abeyant, Forfeited, and Extinct Peerages of the British Empire. London: Harrison.
- Power, Patrick (1907). The Place Names of Decies. London: David Nutt.

Peerage of Ireland
Preceded by John Fitzgerald	Lord of Decies; 1533–1553	Succeeded by Sir Maurice Fitzgerald
