= Mount Vernon Conference =

Meeting of Virginia and Maryland delegates, March 21–28, 1785

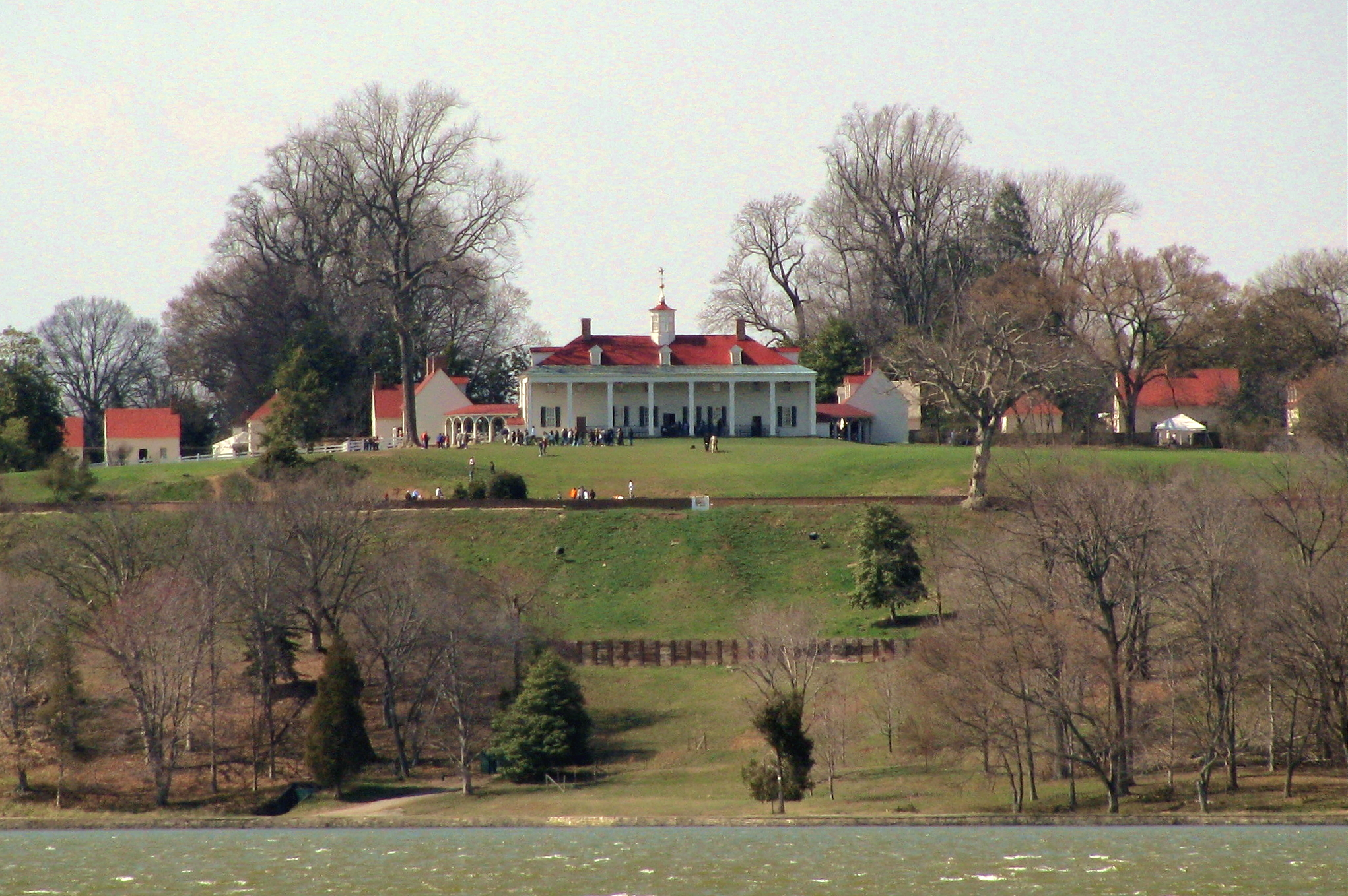
The site of the conference, George Washington's Mount Vernon estate, Fairfax County, Virginia

The Mount Vernon Conference was a meeting of delegates from Virginia and Maryland held at Mount Vernon on March 21–28, 1785, to discuss navigational rights in the states' common waterways. On March 28, 1785, the group drew up a thirteen-point proposal to govern the rights of both states on the Potomac River, Pocomoke River, and Chesapeake Bay. Known as the Mount Vernon Compact and formally titled as the Compact of 1785, this agreement not only covered tidewater navigation but also extended to issues such as toll duties, commerce regulations, fishing rights, and debt collection. Ratified by the legislature of both states, the compact helped set a precedent for later meetings between states for discussions into areas of mutual concern.

== Background ==
The circumstances that led to the conference began as the country emerged victorious from the American Revolutionary War. Lacking an effective central government under the Articles of Confederation, the states quarreled among themselves, and some even established proprietary regulations, tariffs, and currency. To ensure mutually-profitable commerce on their shared waterways, the Virginia and Maryland legislatures recognized the need for an agreement between both states regarding the jurisdiction of the waters. The awareness led to the chartering in Maryland (1784) and in Virginia (1785) of the Potomac Company to make improvements to the Potomac River and to improve its navigability beyond its fall line for commerce. The company's goal was the linking of the East Coast with the trans-Appalachian Northwest Territory.

The conference was initially scheduled to begin March 21, 1785, in Alexandria, Virginia. Maryland delegates included Samuel Chase, Daniel of St. Thomas Jenifer, and Thomas Stone. From Virginia, Alexander Henderson and George Mason attended; James Madison and Edmund Randolph had been appointed but were not sufficiently notified of their appointments. None of Virginia's delegates were present when Maryland's arrived for the meeting. George Washington, who had been corresponding with Stone about the conference, offered them the hospitality of his Mount Vernon estate in Fairfax County, Virginia, while they waited and then offered to host the gathering itself. Although not an official participant, Washington, with his authoritative knowledge of the issues and active interest in Potomac navigation, inspired the delegates and lent considerable prestige to the proceedings.

== Conference ==
The conference reconvened at Mount Vernon on March 25, 1785, with Washington presiding. Maryland's representatives were empowered to discuss with Virginia their shared concerns involving the Potomac and Pocomoke Rivers, and the Chesapeake Bay. However, the Virginia legislature's instructions to its appointees focused solely on the Potomac. Nonetheless, common ground was found, and on March 28, a final report was prepared for both state legislatures. The report contained 13 clauses and was ratified by Maryland and Virginia. It declared the Potomac, which was under Maryland's sole jurisdiction, to be a common waterway for use by Virginia as well. It provided for reciprocal fishing rights, dividing the costs of constructing navigation aids, co-operation on defense and cases of piracy. It also called for commissioners to deal with any future problems that might arise. Political leaders in Pennsylvania and Delaware were invited to join the agreement as well.

== Legacy ==
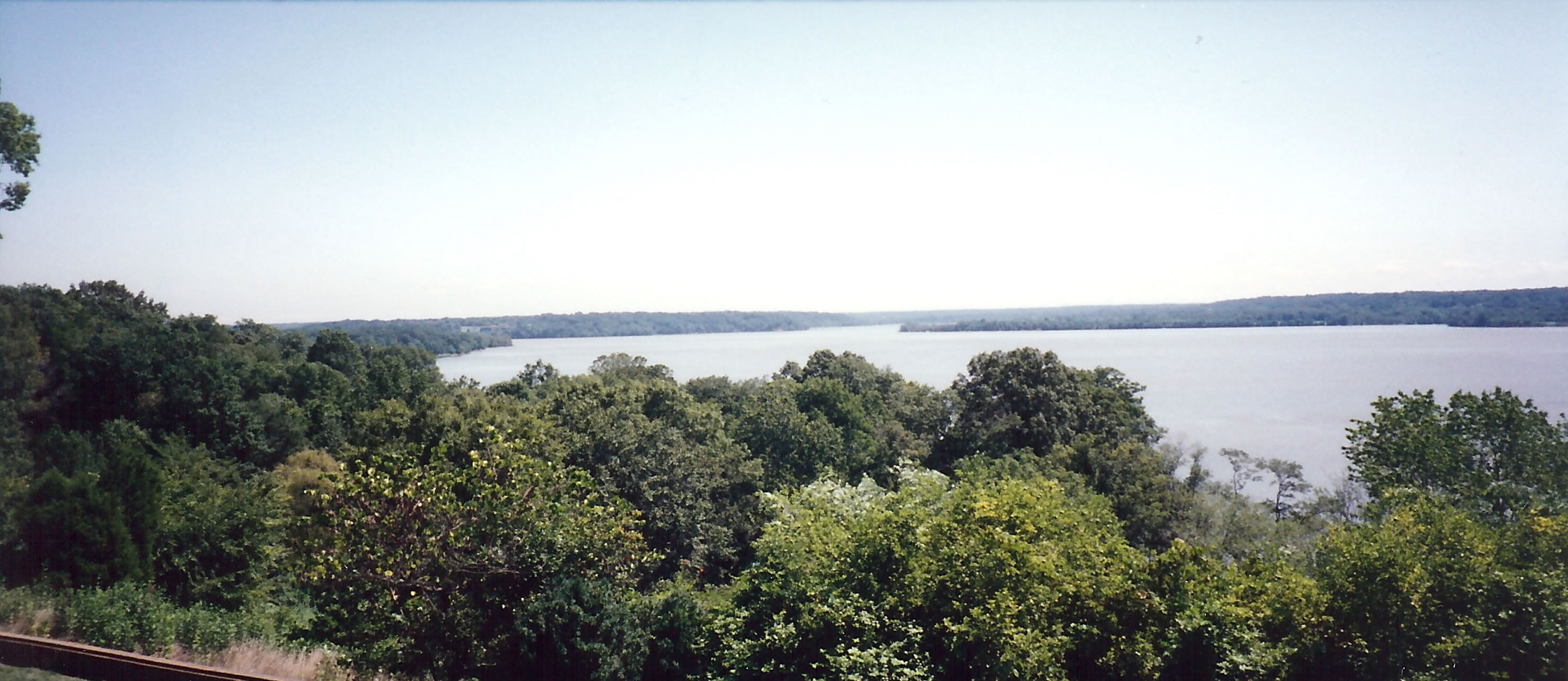
View of the Potomac from Mount Vernon, Fairfax County, Virginia, toward the Maryland shore

The Mount Vernon Conference became a model of interstate co-operation outside the framework of the Articles of Confederation. Its success encouraged James Madison to advocate for further discussions on constitutional issues facing the states. He had little to show for efforts to get Virginia's delegates in the Continental Congress to seek expanded powers to deal with trade issues. Instead, he introduced a proposal in the Virginia General Assembly to act on the suggestion of the compact commissioners for further debate of interstate issues. With Maryland's agreement on January 21, 1786, Virginia invited all of the states to attend another meeting on commercial issues, the groundbreaking Annapolis Convention.

The second interstate political convention, formally titled "A Meeting of Commissioners to Remedy Defects of the Federal Government," convened at George Mann's Tavern held in Annapolis, Maryland, on September 11, 1786.

Delegates from five states (appointed delegates from four others either arrived too late to participate or otherwise did not attend) gathered to discuss ways to facilitate commerce between the states and establish standard rules and regulations. As a result of the gathering, commissioners called for there to be another constitutional convention for possible improvements to the Articles of Confederation to be discussed. The desired convention took place in Philadelphia in the summer of 1787.

The meetings at Mount Vernon and Annapolis paved the way for the Philadelphia Convention, which further strengthened the concept of interstate co-operation and resulted in a new federal Constitution. There, Gouverneur Morris of Pennsylvania made oblique reference to the success of the Mount Vernon Conference. In 1908, a government commission associated the related events more closely.

The earliest movement toward developing the inland waterways of the country began when, under the influence of George Washington, Virginia and Maryland appointed commissioners primarily to consider the navigation and improvement of the Potomac; they met in 1785 in Alexandria and adjourned to Mount Vernon, where they planned for extension, pursuant to which they reassembled with representatives of other States in Annapolis in 1786; again finding the task a growing one, a further conference was arranged in Philadelphia in 1787, with delegates from all the States. There the deliberations resulted in the framing of the Constitution, whereby the thirteen original States were united primarily on a commercial basis — the commerce of the times being chiefly by water.

== See also ==
- Virginia v. Maryland, 540 U.S. 56 (2003), U.S. Supreme Court case affirming Virginia’s Potomac River rights under the 1785 Mount Vernon Compact
