= 2021 term opinions of the Supreme Court of the United States =

October 2021 to October 2022 opinions

The 2021 term of the Supreme Court of the United States began October 4, 2021, and concluded October 2, 2022. The table below illustrates which opinion was filed by each justice in each case and which justices joined each opinion.

== Table key ==
Delivered the court's opinion

Joined the court's opinion

Filed a concurrence

Joined a concurrence

Filed a dissent

Joined a dissent

Filed a concurrence/dissent

Joined a concurrence/dissent

Filed a statement

Joined a statement

Did not participate in the decision
- Decisions that do not note an argument date were decided without oral argument. Decisions that do not note a justice delivering the court's opinion are per curiam.
- Multiple concurrences and dissents within a case are numbered, with joining votes numbered accordingly. Justices frequently join multiple opinions in a single case; each vote is subdivided accordingly.
- An asterisk ( * ) in the court's opinion denotes that it was only a majority in part or a plurality. An asterisk in a joining vote denotes that the justice joined it only in part.
- A dash ( - ) denotes that the justice voted without filing or joining an opinion.

== 2021 term opinions ==
#	Case name and citation	Argued	Decided	Roberts	Thomas	Breyer	Alito	Sotomayor	Kagan	Gorsuch	Kavanaugh	Barrett
1	Rivas-Villegas v. Cortesluna, 595 U.S. 1		October 18, 2021									
2	City of Tahlequah v. Bond, 595 U.S. 9		October 18, 2021									
3	Mississippi v. Tennessee, 595 U.S. 15	October 4, 2021	November 22, 2021									
4	Whole Woman's Health v. Jackson, 595 U.S. 30	November 1, 2021	December 10, 2021	2	* / 1	2 / 3		2 / 3	2 / 3	*		
5	United States v. Texas, 595 U.S. 74	November 1, 2021	December 10, 2021					-				
6	Babcock v. Kijakazi, 595 U.S. 77	October 13, 2021	January 13, 2022									
7	Biden v. Missouri, 595 U.S. 87	January 7, 2022	January 13, 2022		1 / 2		1 / 2			1 / 2		1 / 2
8	National Federation of Independent Business v. Department of Labor, Occupational Safety and Health Administration, 595 U.S. 109	January 7, 2022	January 13, 2022									
9	Hemphill v. New York, 595 U.S. 140	October 5, 2021	January 20, 2022									
10	Hughes v. Northwestern University, 595 U.S. 170	December 6, 2021	January 24, 2022									
11	Unicolors, Inc v. H&M Hennes & Mauritz, LP, 595 U.S. 178	November 8, 2021	February 24, 2022							*		
12	United States v. Zubaydah, 595 U.S. 195	October 6, 2021	March 3, 2022		* / 1	*	* / 1		*		* / 2	* / 2
13	Cameron v. EMW Women's Surgical Center, P.S.C., 595 U.S. 267	October 12, 2021	March 3, 2022		1	2			2			
14	United States v. Tsarnaev, 595 U.S. 302	October 13, 2021	March 4, 2022					*	*			
15	Federal Bureau of Investigation v. Fazaga, 595 U.S. 344	November 8, 2021	March 4, 2022									
16	Wooden v. United States, 595 U.S. 360	October 4, 2021	March 7, 2022		* / 3		*	1 / 4*		4	2	* / 3
17	Wisconsin Legislature v. Wisconsin Elections Commission, 595 U.S. 398		March 23, 2022									
18	Ramirez v. Collier, 595 U.S. 411	November 9, 2021	March 24, 2022					1			2	
19	Houston Community College System v. Wilson, 595 U.S. 468	November 2, 2021	March 24, 2022									
20	Badgerow v. Walters, 596 U.S. 1	November 2, 2021	March 31, 2022									
21	Thompson v. Clark, 596 U.S. 36	October 12, 2021	April 4, 2022									
22	City of Austin v. Reagan National Advertising of Austin, LLC, 596 U.S. 61	November 10, 2021	April 21, 2022									
23	Cassirer v. Thyssen-Bornemisza Collection Foundation, 596 U.S. 107	January 18, 2022	April 21, 2022									
24	Brown v. Davenport, 596 U.S. 118	October 5, 2021	April 21, 2022									
25	United States v. Vaello Madero, 596 U.S. 159	October 5, 2021	April 21, 2022		1					2		
26	Boechler v. Commissioner, 596 U.S. 199	January 12, 2022	April 21, 2022									
27	Cummings v. Premier Rehab Keller, P.L.L.C., 596 U.S. 212	November 30, 2021	April 28, 2022									
28	LeDure v. Union Pacific Railroad Company, 596 U.S. 242	March 28, 2022	April 28, 2022									
29	Shurtleff v. Boston, 596 U.S. 243	January 18, 2022	May 2, 2022		2 / 3		2			2 / 3	1	
30	FEC v. Ted Cruz for Senate, 596 U.S. 289	January 19, 2022	May 16, 2022									
31	Patel v. Garland, 596 U.S. 328	December 6, 2021	May 16, 2022									
32	Shinn v. Ramirez, 596 U.S. 366	December 8, 2021	May 23, 2022									
33	Morgan v. Sundance, Inc., 596 U.S. 411	March 21, 2022	May 23, 2022									
34	Gallardo v. Marstiller, 596 U.S. 420	January 10, 2022	June 6, 2022									
35	Southwest Airlines Co. v. Saxon, 596 U.S. 450	March 28, 2022	June 6, 2022									
36	Siegel v. Fitzgerald, 596 U.S. 464	April 18, 2022	June 6, 2022									
37	Egbert v. Boule, 596 U.S. 482	March 2, 2022	June 8, 2022									
38	Kemp v. United States, 596 U.S. 528	April 19, 2022	June 13, 2022									
39	Garland v. Gonzalez, 596 U.S. 543	January 11, 2022	June 13, 2022			*						
40	Johnson v. Arteaga-Martinez, 596 U.S. 573	January 11, 2022	June 13, 2022							*		
41	Denezpi v. United States, 596 U.S. 591	February 22, 2022	June 13, 2022					*	*			
42	ZF Automotive U. S., Inc. v. Luxshare, Ltd., 596 U.S. 619	March 23, 2022	June 13, 2022									
43	Viking River Cruises, Inc. v. Moriana, 596 U.S. 639	March 30, 2022	June 15, 2022	* / 2*				1			* / 2	* / 2
44	Golan v. Saada, 596 U.S. 666	March 22, 2022	June 15, 2022									
45	Ysleta del Sur Pueblo v. Texas, 596 U.S. 685	February 22, 2022	June 15, 2022									
46	American Hospital Association v. Becerra, 596 U.S. 724	November 30, 2021	June 15, 2022									
47	George v. McDonough, 596 U.S. 740	April 19, 2022	June 15, 2022			2		1 / 2*		2		
48	Arizona v. City and County of San Francisco, 596 U.S. 763	February 23, 2022	June 15, 2022									
49	Carson v. Makin, 596 U.S. 767	December 8, 2021	June 21, 2022			1		1* / 2	1			
50	Shoop v. Twyford, 596 U.S. 811	April 26, 2022	June 21, 2022			1		1	1	2		
51	United States v. Washington, 596 U.S. 832	April 18, 2022	June 21, 2022									
52	United States v. Taylor, 596 U.S. 845	December 7, 2021	June 21, 2022		1		2					
53	Marietta Memorial Hospital Employee Health Benefit Plan v. DaVita Inc., 596 U.S. 880	March 1, 2022	June 21, 2022									
54	New York State Rifle & Pistol Association, Inc. v. Bruen, 597 U.S. 1	November 3, 2021	June 23, 2022	2			1				2	3
55	Vega v. Tekoh, 597 U.S. 134	March 21, 2022	June 23, 2022									
56	Nance v. Ward, 597 U.S. 159	April 25, 2022	June 23, 2022									
57	Berger v. North Carolina State Conference of the NAACP, 597 U.S. 179	March 21, 2022	June 23, 2022									
58	Dobbs v. Jackson Women's Health Organization, 597 U.S. 215	December 1, 2021	June 24, 2022	3	1						2	
59	Becerra v. Empire Health Foundation, For Valley Hospital Medical Center, 597 U.S. 424	November 29, 2021	June 24, 2022									
60	Ruan v. United States, 597 U.S. 450	March 1, 2022	June 27, 2022									*
61	Concepcion v. United States, 597 U.S. 481	January 19, 2022	June 27, 2022									
62	Kennedy v. Bremerton School District, 597 U.S. 507	April 25, 2022	June 27, 2022		1		2				*	
63	Torres v. Texas Department of Public Safety, 597 U.S. 580	March 29, 2022	June 29, 2022									
64	Oklahoma v. Castro-Huerta, 597 U.S. 629	April 27, 2022	June 29, 2022									
65	West Virginia v. EPA, 597 U.S. 697	February 28, 2022	June 30, 2022									
66	Biden v. Texas, 597 U.S. 785	April 26, 2022	June 30, 2022		1 / 2*		1 / 2*			1 / 2*		2
#	Case name and citation	Argued	Decided	Roberts	Thomas	Breyer	Alito	Sotomayor	Kagan	Gorsuch	Kavanaugh	Barrett

== 2021 term membership and statistics ==
This was the seventeenth term of Chief Justice Roberts's tenure. Justice Breyer retired on June 30, 2022, making it the second and final (and also the only full) term with the same membership. The seat was filled by Ketanji Brown Jackson on the same day.

Justice		Appointment history		Agreement with judgment		Opinions filed				
Seniority	Name	President	Date confirmed	%	#					Total
Chief Justice	John Roberts	George W. Bush	September 29, 2005	93.9%	62/66	8	2	1	1	12
Associate Justice	Clarence Thomas	George H. W. Bush	October 15, 1991	80.3%	53/66	7	6	1	8	22
Associate Justice	Stephen Breyer	Bill Clinton	August 3, 1994	66.7%	44/66	6	1	1	8	16
Associate Justice	Samuel Alito	George W. Bush	January 31, 2006	83.3%	55/66	6	5	1	4	16
Associate Justice	Sonia Sotomayor	Barack Obama	August 6, 2009	57.6%	38/66	7	4	3	11	25
Associate Justice	Elena Kagan	Barack Obama	August 7, 2010	66.7%	44/66	6	2	1	7	16
Associate Justice	Neil Gorsuch	Donald Trump	April 7, 2017	75.8%	50/66	7	6	0	8	21
Associate Justice	Brett Kavanaugh	Donald Trump	October 6, 2018	95.5%	63/66	5	8	0	2	15
Associate Justice	Amy Coney Barrett	Donald Trump	October 26, 2020	90.5%	57/63	6	4	0	2	12
Notes on statistics: Opinion counts only include the bench opinions listed above; opinions relating to orders or in-chambers opinions are not included.; Agreement with the Court's judgment does not guarantee agreement with the reasoning expressed in its opinion. A justice is not considered in agreement if they dissented even in part. Agreement percentages are based only on the listed cases in which a justice participated and are rounded to the nearest one-tenth of one percentage point.; Individual opinion counts will not match the Court's totals; the dissents in National Federation of Independent Business v. Department of Labor, Occupational Safety and Health Administration and Dobbs v. Jackson Women's Health Organization that were jointly authored by Breyer, Sotomayor, and Kagan are counted separately for all three justices but counted only once in the Court's totals.						Totals				
						58	38	8	45	149
