= 2021 term United States Supreme Court opinions of Clarence Thomas =

The 2021 term of the Supreme Court of the United States began October 4, 2021, and concluded October 2, 2022. This was the thirty-first term of Associate Justice Clarence Thomas's tenure on the Court.
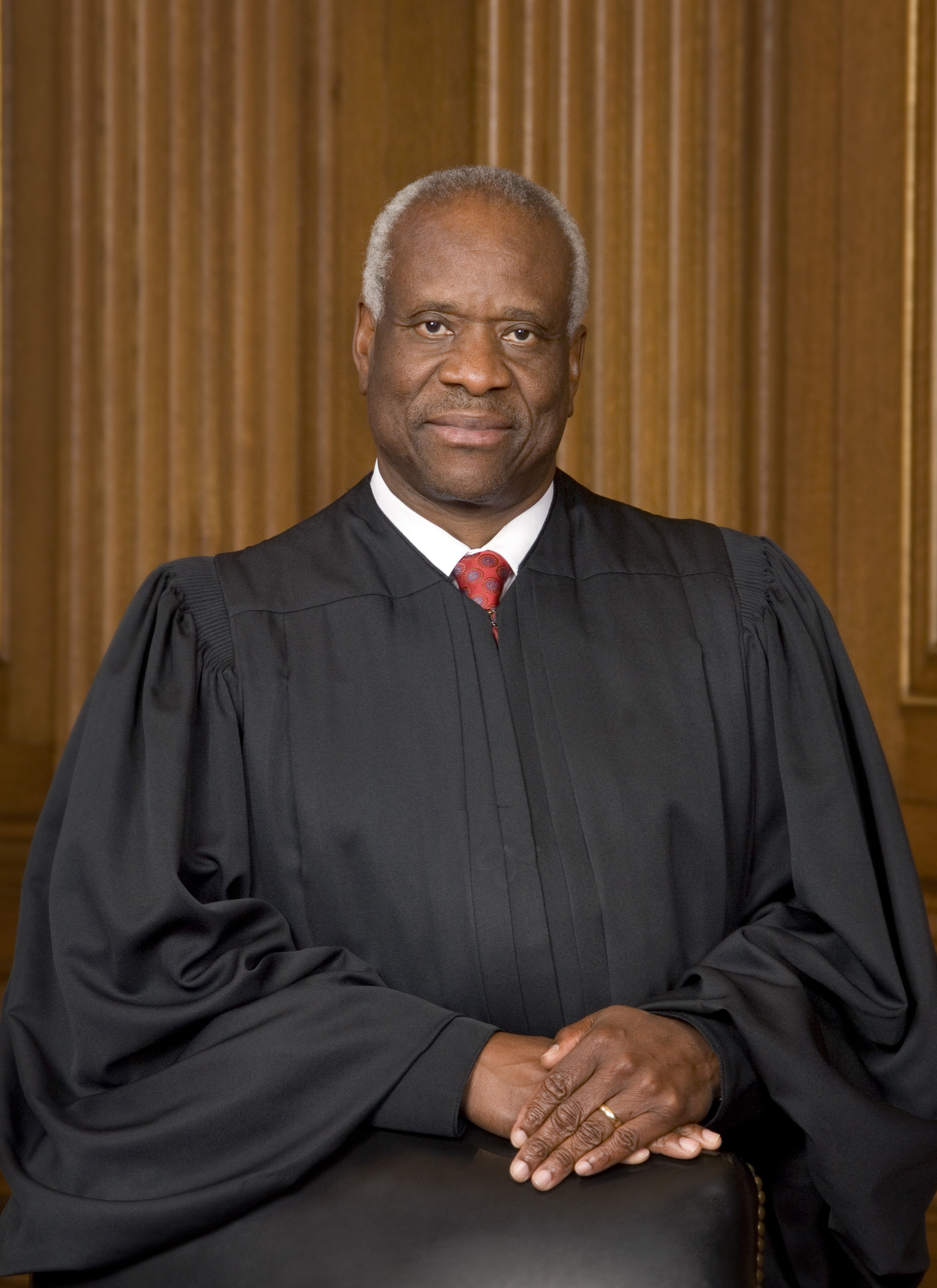

Clarence Thomas 2021 term statistics

7	Majority or plurality	6	Concurrence	1	Other
11	Dissent	1	Concurrence/dissent	Total =	26
Bench opinions = 22		Opinions relating to orders = 4		In-chambers opinions = 0
Unanimous opinions: 0		Most joined by: Alito (13)		Least joined by: Breyer, Sotomayor (2)

Type	Case	Citation	Issues	Joined by	Other opinions
	Whole Woman's Health v. Jackson	595 U.S. ___ (2021)			Gorsuch; Roberts; Sotomayor
	Biden v. Missouri	595 U.S. ___ (2022)		Alito, Gorsuch, Barrett	per curiam; Alito
Thomas dissented from the Court's grant of applications for stays.
	Hemphill v. New York	595 U.S. ___ (2022)			Sotomayor; Alito
	Unicolors, Inc v. H&M Hennes & Mauritz, LP	595 U.S. ___ (2022)		Alito; Gorsuch (in part)	Breyer
	United States v. Zubaydah	595 U.S. ___ (2022)		Alito	Breyer; Kavanaugh; Kagan; Gorsuch
	Cameron v. EMW Women's Surgical Center, P.S.C.	595 U.S. ___ (2022)			Alito; Kagan; Sotomayor
	United States v. Tsarnaev	595 U.S. ___ (2022)		Roberts, Alito, Gorsuch, Kavanaugh, Barrett	Barrett; Breyer
	Doe v. Facebook, Inc.	595 U.S. ___ (2022)			
Thomas filed a statement respecting the Court's denial of certiorari.
	Ramirez v. Collier	595 U.S. ___ (2022)			Roberts; Sotomayor; Kavanaugh
	City of Austin v. Reagan National Advertising of Austin, LLC	596 U.S. ___ (2022)		Gorsuch, Barrett	Sotomayor; Breyer; Alito
	United States v. Vaello Madero	596 U.S. ___ (2022)			Kavanaugh; Gorsuch; Sotomayor
	Shinn v. Ramirez	596 U.S. ___ (2022)		Roberts, Alito, Gorsuch, Kavanaugh, Barrett	Sotomayor
	Gallardo v. Marstiller	596 U.S. ___ (2022)		Roberts, Alito, Kagan, Gorsuch, Kavanaugh, Barrett	Sotomayor
	Southwest Airlines Co. v. Saxon	596 U.S. ___ (2022)		Roberts, Breyer, Alito, Sotomayor, Kagan, Gorsuch, Kavanaugh	
	Egbert v. Boule	596 U.S. ___ (2022)		Roberts, Alito, Kavanaugh, Barrett	Gorsuch; Sotomayor
	Kemp v. United States	596 U.S. ___ (2022)		Roberts, Breyer, Alito, Sotomayor, Kagan, Kavanaugh, Barrett	Sotomayor; Gorsuch
	Johnson v. Arteaga-Martinez	596 U.S. ___ (2022)		Gorsuch (in part)	Sotomayor; Breyer
	Viking River Cruises, Inc. v. Moriana	596 U.S. ___ (2022)			Alito; Sotomayor; Barrett
	Shoop v. Cassano	596 U.S. ___ (2022)		Alito	
	United States v. Taylor	596 U.S. ___ (2022)			Gorsuch; Alito
	New York State Rifle & Pistol Association, Inc. v. Bruen	597 U.S. ___ (2022)		Roberts, Alito, Gorsuch, Kavanaugh, Barrett	Alito; Kavanaugh; Barrett; Breyer
	Dobbs v. Jackson Women's Health Organization	597 U.S. ___ (2022)			Alito; Kavanaugh; Roberts; Breyer, Sotomayor, Kagan
	Coral Ridge Ministries Media, Inc. v. Southern Poverty Law Center	597 U.S. ___ (2022)			
Thomas dissented from the Court's denial of certiorari.
	Kennedy v. Bremerton School District	597 U.S. ___ (2022)			Gorsuch; Alito; Sotomayor
	Torres v. Texas Department of Public Safety	597 U.S. ___ (2022)		Alito, Gorsuch, Barrett	Breyer; Kagan
	Dr. A v. Hochul	597 U.S. ___ (2022)		Alito, Gorsuch	
Thomas dissented from the Court's denial of certiorari.
