= 2021 term United States Supreme Court opinions of Sonia Sotomayor =

The 2021 term of the Supreme Court of the United States began October 4, 2021, and concluded October 2, 2022. This was the thirteenth term of Associate Justice Sonia Sotomayor's tenure on the Court.
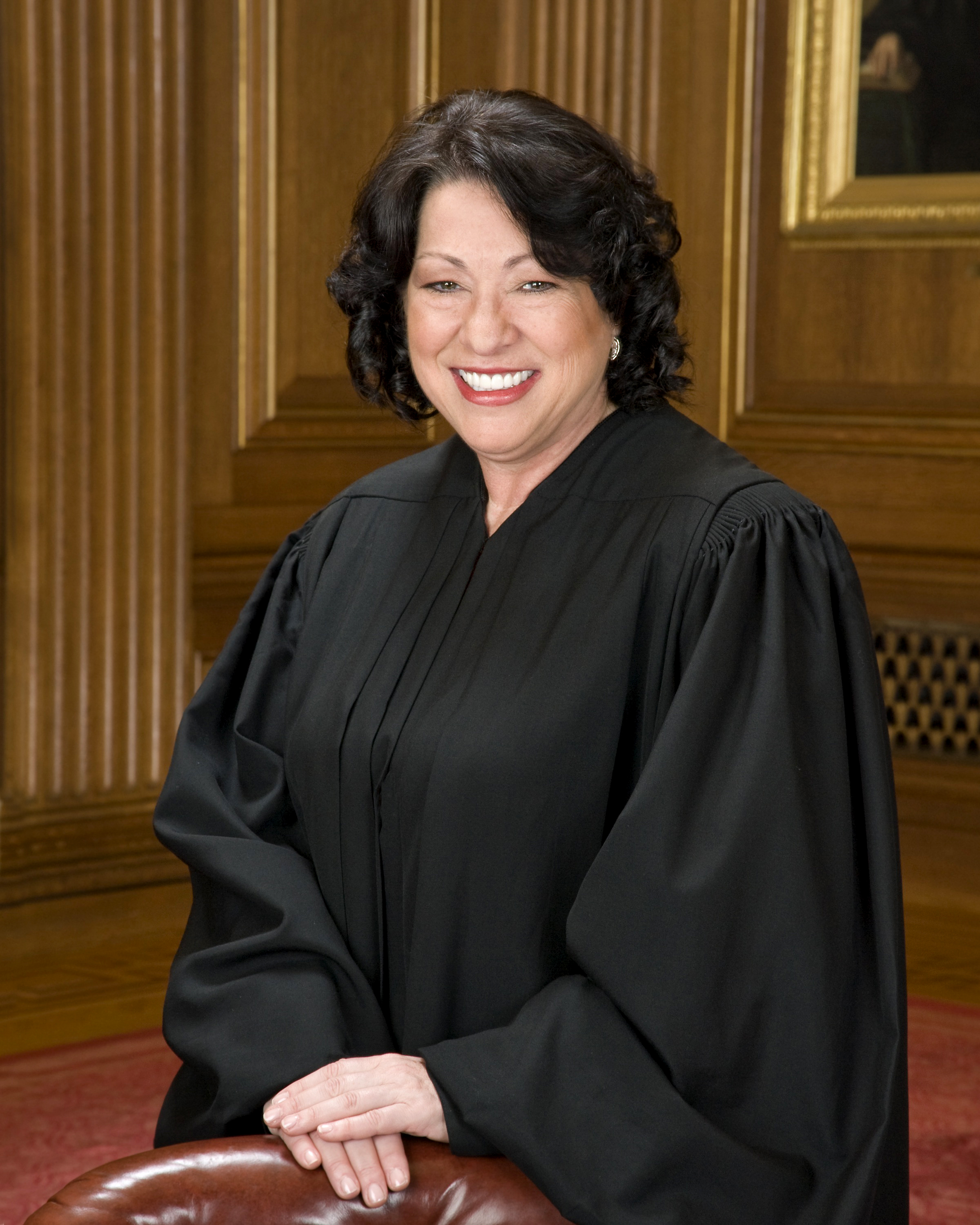

Sonia Sotomayor 2021 term statistics

7	Majority or plurality	4	Concurrence	8	Other
22	Dissent	4	Concurrence/dissent	Total =	45
Bench opinions = 25		Opinions relating to orders = 20		In-chambers opinions = 0
Unanimous opinions: 2		Most joined by: Kagan (22)		Least joined by: Thomas, Alito (5)

Type	Case	Citation	Issues	Joined by	Other opinions
	Gann v. United States	595 U.S. ___ (2021)			
Sotomayor filed a statement respecting the Court's denial of certiorari.
	Thomas v. Payne	595 U.S. ___ (2021)			
Sotomayor filed a statement respecting the Court's denial of certiorari.
	James v. Bartelt	595 U.S. ___ (2021)			
Sotomayor dissented from the Court's denial of certiorari.
	Smith v. Dunn	595 U.S. ___ (2021)			
Sotomayor filed a statement respecting the Court's denial of stay of execution.
	United States v. Texas	595 U.S. ___ (2021)			
Sotomayor concurred in the Court's grant of certiorari before judgment and dissented from the Court's deferral of application to vacate stay.
	Coonce v. United States	595 U.S. ___ (2021)		Breyer, Kagan	
Sotomayor dissented from the Court's denial of certiorari.
	Simmons v. United States	595 U.S. ___ (2021)		Kagan	
Sotomayor filed a statement respecting the Court's denial of certiorari.
	Tucker v. Shreveport	595 U.S. ___ (2021)			
Sotomayor filed a statement respecting the Court's denial of certiorari.
	Whole Woman's Health v. Jackson	595 U.S. ___ (2021)		Breyer, Kagan	Gorsuch; Thomas; Roberts
	Guerrant v. United States	595 U.S. ___ (2022)		Barrett	
Sotomayor filed a statement respecting the Court's denial of certiorari.
	National Federation of Independent Business v. Department of Labor, Occupational Safety and Health Administration	595 U.S. ___ (2022)			per curiam; Gorsuch
Sotomayor dissented from the Court's grant of applications for stays. Signed jointly with Breyer and Kagan.
	Hemphill v. New York	595 U.S. ___ (2022)		Roberts, Breyer, Alito, Kagan, Gorsuch, Kavanaugh, Barrett	Alito; Thomas
	In re Whole Woman's Health	595 U.S. ___ (2022)		Breyer, Kagan	Breyer
Sotomayor dissented from the Court's denial of mandamus.
	Hughes v. Northwestern University	595 U.S. ___ (2022)		Roberts, Thomas, Breyer, Alito, Kagan, Gorsuch, Kavanaugh	
	Ortiz v. Breslin	595 U.S. ___ (2022)			
Sotomayor filed a statement respecting the Court's denial of certiorari.
	Holcombe v. Florida	595 U.S. ___ (2022)			
Sotomayor dissented from the Court's denial of certiorari.
	Cameron v. EMW Women's Surgical Center, P.S.C.	595 U.S. ___ (2022)			Alito; Thomas; Kagan
	Wooden v. United States	595 U.S. ___ (2022)			Kagan; Kavanaugh; Barrett; Gorsuch
	Wisconsin Legislature v. Wisconsin Elections Commission	595 U.S. ___ (2022)		Kagan	per curiam
	Ramirez v. Collier	595 U.S. ___ (2022)			Roberts; Kavanaugh; Thomas
	Love v. Texas	596 U.S. ___ (2022)		Breyer, Kagan	
	City of Austin v. Reagan National Advertising of Austin, LLC	596 U.S. ___ (2022)		Roberts, Breyer, Kagan, Kavanaugh	Breyer; Alito; Thomas
	United States v. Vaello Madero	596 U.S. ___ (2022)			Kavanaugh; Thomas; Gorsuch
	Shinn v. Ramirez	596 U.S. ___ (2022)		Breyer, Kagan	Thomas
	Gallardo v. Marstiller	596 U.S. ___ (2022)		Breyer	Thomas
	Siegel v. Fitzgerald	596 U.S. ___ (2022)		Unanimous	
	Egbert v. Boule	596 U.S. ___ (2022)		Breyer, Kagan	Thomas; Gorsuch
	Andrus v. Texas	596 U.S. ___ (2022)		Breyer, Kagan	
Sotomayor dissented from the Court's denial of certiorari.
	Kemp v. United States	596 U.S. ___ (2022)			Thomas; Gorsuch
	Garland v. Gonzalez	596 U.S. ___ (2022)		Kagan; Breyer (in part)	Alito
	Johnson v. Arteaga-Martinez	596 U.S. ___ (2022)		Roberts, Thomas, Alito, Kagan, Gorsuch, Kavanaugh, Barrett	Thomas; Breyer
	Viking River Cruises, Inc. v. Moriana	596 U.S. ___ (2022)			Alito; Barrett; Thomas
	Golan v. Saada	596 U.S. ___ (2022)		Unanimous	
	George v. McDonough	596 U.S. ___ (2022)			Barrett; Gorsuch
	Carson v. Makin	596 U.S. ___ (2022)			Roberts; Breyer
	Berger v. North Carolina State Conference of the NAACP	597 U.S. ___ (2022)			Gorsuch
	Dobbs v. Jackson Women's Health Organization	597 U.S. ___ (2022)			Alito; Thomas; Kavanaugh; Roberts
Signed jointly with Breyer and Kagan.
	Concepcion v. United States	597 U.S. ___ (2022)		Thomas, Breyer, Kagan, Gorsuch	Kavanaugh
	Kennedy v. Bremerton School District	597 U.S. ___ (2022)		Breyer, Kagan	Gorsuch; Thomas; Alito
	Canales v. Lumpkin	597 U.S. ___ (2022)			
Sotomayor dissented from the Court's denial of certiorari.
	Ramirez v. Guadarrama	597 U.S. ___ (2022)		Breyer, Kagan	
Sotomayor dissented from the Court's denial of certiorari.
	Cope v. Cogdill	597 U.S. ___ (2022)			
Sotomayor dissented from the Court's denial of certiorari.
	Grzegorczyk v. United States	597 U.S. ___ (2022)		Breyer, Kagan, Gorsuch	Kavanaugh
Sotomayor dissented from the Court's denial of certiorari.
	Hill v. Shoop	597 U.S. ___ (2022)		Breyer, Kagan	
Sotomayor dissented from the Court's denial of certiorari.
	Storey v. Lumpkin	597 U.S. ___ (2022)			
Sotomayor filed a statement respecting the Court's denial of certiorari.
