= 2021 term United States Supreme Court opinions of Neil Gorsuch =

The 2021 term of the Supreme Court of the United States began October 4, 2021, and concluded October 2, 2022. This was the sixth term of Associate Justice Neil Gorsuch's tenure on the Court.
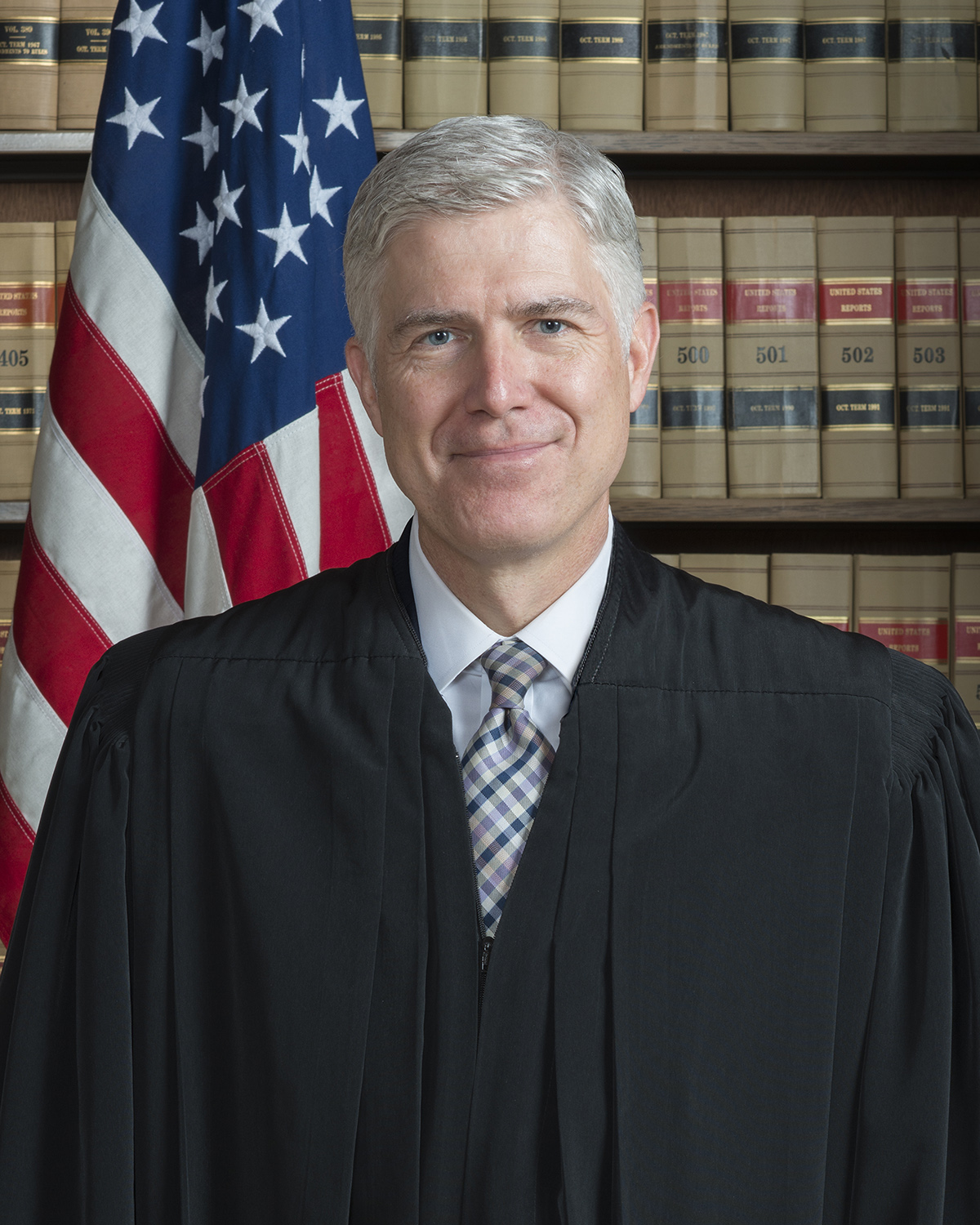

Neil Gorsuch 2021 term statistics

7	Majority or plurality	6	Concurrence	0	Other
12	Dissent	0	Concurrence/dissent	Total =	25
Bench opinions = 21		Opinions relating to orders = 4		In-chambers opinions = 0
Unanimous opinions: 1		Most joined by: Alito (8)		Least joined by: Roberts (4)

Type	Case	Citation	Issues	Joined by	Other opinions
	Does 1–3 v. Mills	595 U.S. ___ (2021)		Thomas, Alito	Barrett
Gorsuch dissented from the Court's denial of application for injunctive relief.
	American Civil Liberties Union v. United States	595 U.S. ___ (2021)		Sotomayor	
Gorsuch dissented from the Court's denial of certiorari.
	Whole Woman's Health v. Jackson	595 U.S. ___ (2021)		Alito, Kavanaugh, Barrett; Thomas (in part)	Thomas; Roberts; Sotomayor
	Dr. A v. Hochul	595 U.S. ___ (2021)		Alito	
Gorsuch dissented from the Court's denial of application for injunctive relief.
	Babcock v. Kijakazi	595 U.S. ___ (2022)			Barrett
	National Federation of Independent Business v. Department of Labor, Occupational Safety and Health Administration	595 U.S. ___ (2022)		Thomas, Alito	per curiam; Breyer, Sotomayor, Kagan
Gorsuch concurred in the Court's grant of applications for stays.
	Trustees of New Life in Christ Church v. Fredericksburg	595 U.S. ___ (2022)			
Gorsuch dissented from the Court's denial of certiorari.
	United States v. Zubaydah	595 U.S. ___ (2022)		Sotomayor	Breyer; Thomas; Kavanaugh; Kagan
	Wooden v. United States	595 U.S. ___ (2022)		Sotomayor (in part)	Kagan; Sotomayor; Kavanaugh; Barrett
	Houston Community College System v. Wilson	595 U.S. ___ (2022)		Unanimous	
	Brown v. Davenport	596 U.S. ___ (2022)		Roberts, Thomas, Alito, Kavanaugh, Barrett	Kagan
	United States v. Vaello Madero	596 U.S. ___ (2022)			Kavanaugh; Thomas; Sotomayor
	Shurtleff v. Boston	596 U.S. ___ (2022)		Thomas	Breyer; Kavanaugh; Alito
	Patel v. Garland	596 U.S. ___ (2022)		Breyer, Sotomayor, Kagan	Barrett
	Egbert v. Boule	596 U.S. ___ (2022)			Thomas; Sotomayor
	Kemp v. United States	596 U.S. ___ (2022)			Thomas; Sotomayor
	Denezpi v. United States	596 U.S. ___ (2022)		Sotomayor, Kagan (in part)	Barrett
	Ysleta del Sur Pueblo v. Texas	596 U.S. ___ (2022)		Breyer, Sotomayor, Kagan, Barrett	Roberts
	George v. McDonough	596 U.S. ___ (2022)		Breyer; Sotomayor (in part)	Barrett; Sotomayor
	Shoop v. Twyford	596 U.S. ___ (2022)			Roberts; Breyer
	United States v. Taylor	596 U.S. ___ (2022)		Roberts, Breyer, Sotomayor, Kagan, Kavanaugh, Barrett	Thomas; Alito
	Berger v. North Carolina State Conference of the NAACP	597 U.S. ___ (2022)		Roberts, Thomas, Breyer, Alito, Kagan, Kavanaugh, Barrett	Sotomayor
	Kennedy v. Bremerton School District	597 U.S. ___ (2022)		Roberts, Thomas, Alito, Barrett; Kavanaugh (in part)	Thomas; Alito; Sotomayor
	Oklahoma v. Castro-Huerta	597 U.S. ___ (2022)		Breyer, Sotomayor, Kagan	Kavanaugh
	West Virginia v. EPA	597 U.S. ___ (2022)		Alito	Roberts; Kagan
