= 2021 term United States Supreme Court opinions of Samuel Alito =

The 2021 term of the Supreme Court of the United States began October 4, 2021, and concluded October 2, 2022. This was the seventeenth term of Associate Justice Samuel Alito's tenure on the Court.
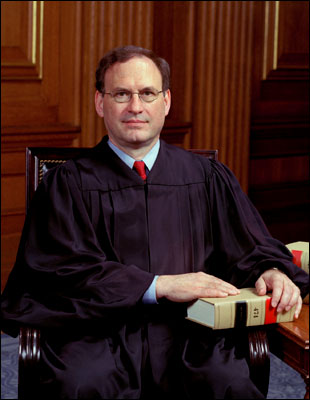

Samuel Alito 2021 term statistics

6	Majority or plurality	5	Concurrence	3	Other
9	Dissent	1	Concurrence/dissent	Total =	24
Bench opinions = 16		Opinions relating to orders = 8		In-chambers opinions = 0
Unanimous opinions: 1		Most joined by: Thomas (17)		Least joined by: Breyer, Sotomayor, Kagan (2)

Type	Case	Citation	Issues	Joined by	Other opinions
	Biden v. Missouri	595 U.S. ___ (2022)		Thomas, Gorsuch, Barrett	per curiam; Thomas
Alito dissented from the Court's grant of applications for stays.
	Hemphill v. New York	595 U.S. ___ (2022)		Kavanaugh	Sotomayor; Thomas
	Gordon College v. DeWeese-Boyd	595 U.S. ___ (2022)		Thomas, Kavanaugh, Barrett	
Alito filed a statement respecting the Court's denial of certiorari.
	Cameron v. EMW Women's Surgical Center, P.S.C.	595 U.S. ___ (2022)		Roberts, Thomas, Gorsuch, Kavanaugh, Barrett	Thomas; Kagan; Sotomayor
	Federal Bureau of Investigation v. Fazaga	595 U.S. ___ (2022)		Unanimous	
	Moore v. Harper	595 U.S. ___ (2022)		Thomas, Gorsuch	Kavanaugh
Alito dissented from the Court's denial of application for stay.
	Seattle's Union Gospel Mission v. Woods	595 U.S. ___ (2022)		Thomas	
Alito filed a statement respecting the Court's denial of certiorari.
	Austin v. U. S. Navy SEALs 1–26	595 U.S. ___ (2022)		Gorsuch	Kavanaugh
Alito dissented from the Court's grant of application for partial stay.
	Texas v. Commissioner of Internal Revenue	596 U.S. ___ (2022)		Thomas, Gorsuch	
Alito filed a statement respecting the Court's denial of certiorari.
	Thompson v. Clark	596 U.S. ___ (2022)		Thomas, Gorsuch	Kavanaugh
	City of Austin v. Reagan National Advertising of Austin, LLC	596 U.S. ___ (2022)			Sotomayor; Breyer; Thomas
	Shurtleff v. Boston	596 U.S. ___ (2022)		Thomas, Gorsuch	Breyer; Kavanaugh; Gorsuch
	NetChoice, LLC v. Paxton	596 U.S. ___ (2022)		Thomas, Gorsuch	
	Ritter v. Migliori	596 U.S. ___ (2022)		Thomas, Gorsuch	
	Garland v. Gonzalez	596 U.S. ___ (2022)		Roberts, Thomas, Gorsuch, Kavanaugh, Barrett	Sotomayor
	Viking River Cruises, Inc. v. Moriana	596 U.S. ___ (2022)		Breyer, Sotomayor, Kagan, Gorsuch; Roberts, Kavanaugh, Barrett (in part)	Sotomayor; Barrett; Thomas
	United States v. Taylor	596 U.S. ___ (2022)			Gorsuch; Thomas
	New York State Rifle & Pistol Association, Inc. v. Bruen	597 U.S. ___ (2022)			Thomas; Kavanaugh; Barrett; Breyer
	Vega v. Tekoh	597 U.S. ___ (2022)		Roberts, Thomas, Gorsuch, Kavanaugh, Barrett	Kagan
	Dobbs v. Jackson Women's Health Organization	597 U.S. ___ (2022)		Thomas, Gorsuch, Kavanaugh, Barrett	Thomas; Kavanaugh; Roberts; Breyer, Sotomayor, Kagan
	Ruan v. United States	597 U.S. ___ (2022)		Thomas; Barrett (in part)	Breyer
	Kennedy v. Bremerton School District	597 U.S. ___ (2022)			Gorsuch; Thomas; Sotomayor
	Biden v. Texas	597 U.S. ___ (2022)		Thomas, Gorsuch	Roberts; Kavanaugh; Barrett
	Yeshiva University v. YU Pride Alliance	597 U.S. ___ (2022)		Thomas, Gorsuch, Barrett	
