= 2021 term United States Supreme Court opinions of Stephen Breyer =

The 2021 term of the Supreme Court of the United States began October 4, 2021, and concluded October 2, 2022. This was the twenty-eighth and final term of Associate Justice Stephen Breyer's tenure on the Court; Breyer retired on June 30, 2022.
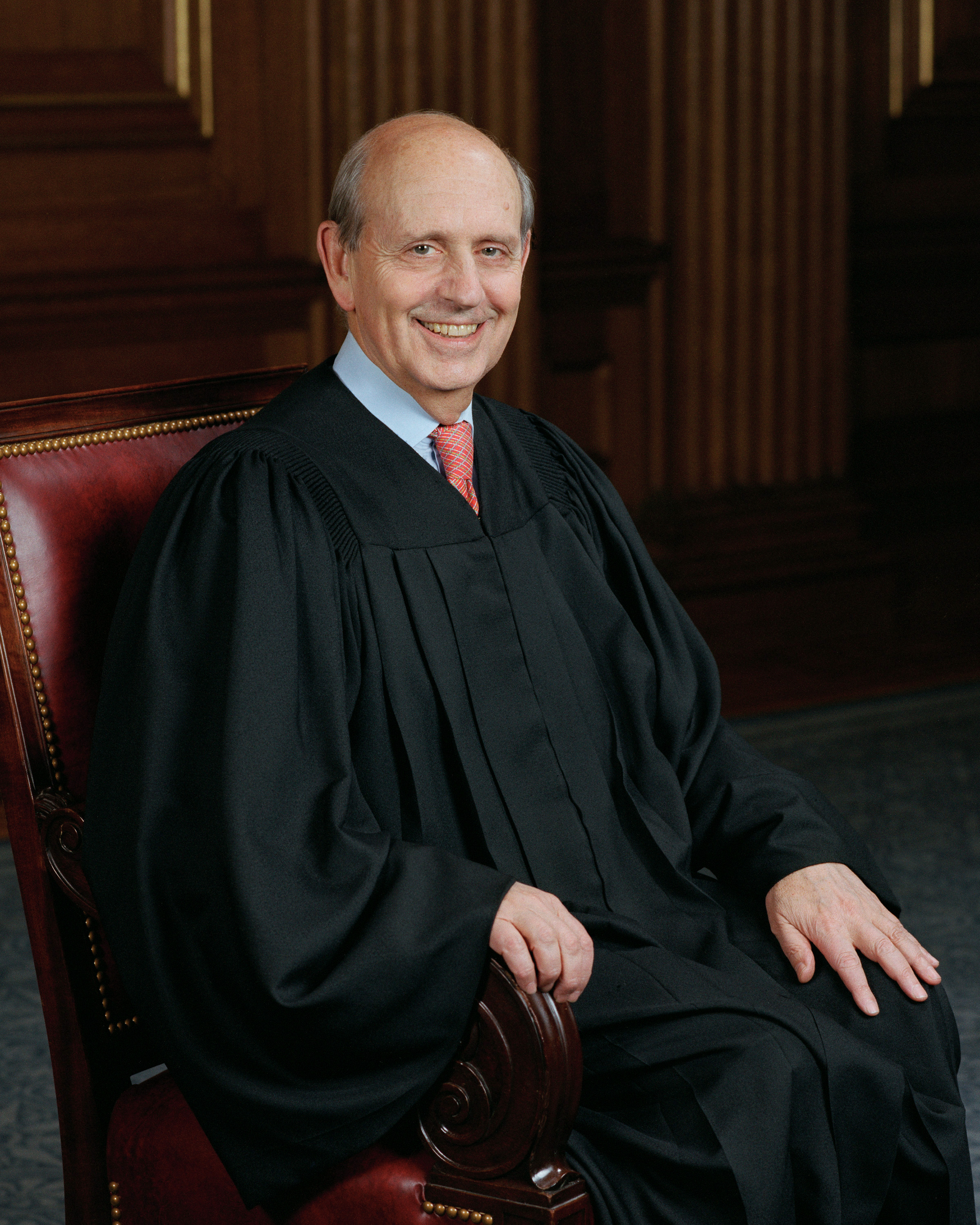

Stephen Breyer 2021 term statistics

6	Majority or plurality	1	Concurrence	3	Other
9	Dissent	1	Concurrence/dissent	Total =	20
Bench opinions = 16		Opinions relating to orders = 4		In-chambers opinions = 0
Unanimous opinions: 1		Most joined by: Kagan (10 in full, 2 in part)		Least joined by: Thomas, Alito (1 in full, 1 in part)

Type	Case	Citation	Issues	Joined by	Other opinions
	Buntion v. Lumpkin	595 U.S. ___ (2021)			
Breyer filed a statement respecting the Court's denial of certiorari.
	National Federation of Independent Business v. Department of Labor, Occupational Safety and Health Administration	595 U.S. ___ (2022)			per curiam; Gorsuch
Breyer dissented from the Court's grant of applications for stays. Signed jointly with Sotomayor and Kagan.
	In re Whole Woman's Health	595 U.S. ___ (2022)		Sotomayor, Kagan	Sotomayor
Breyer dissented from the Court's denial of mandamus.
	Unicolors, Inc v. H&M Hennes & Mauritz, LP	595 U.S. ___ (2022)		Roberts, Sotomayor, Kagan, Kavanaugh, Barrett	Thomas
	United States v. Zubaydah	595 U.S. ___ (2022)		Roberts; Thomas, Alito, Kagan, Kavanaugh, Barrett (in part)	Thomas; Kavanaugh; Kagan; Gorsuch
	United States v. Tsarnaev	595 U.S. ___ (2022)		Sotomayor, Kagan (in part)	Thomas; Barrett
	Badgerow v. Walters	596 U.S. ___ (2022)			Kagan
	City of Austin v. Reagan National Advertising of Austin, LLC	596 U.S. ___ (2022)			Sotomayor; Alito; Thomas
	Buntion v. Lumpkin	596 U.S. ___ (2022)			
Breyer filed a statement respecting the Court's denial of application for stay of execution.
	Cummings v. Premier Rehab Keller, P.L.L.C.	596 U.S. ___ (2022)		Sotomayor, Kagan	Roberts; Kavanaugh
	Shurtleff v. Boston	596 U.S. ___ (2022)		Roberts, Sotomayor, Kagan, Kavanaugh, Barrett	Kavanaugh; Alito; Gorsuch
	Smith v. Shinn	596 U.S. ___ (2022)			
Breyer filed a statement respecting the Court's denial of certiorari.
	Johnson v. Arteaga-Martinez	596 U.S. ___ (2022)			Sotomayor; Thomas
	Carson v. Makin	596 U.S. ___ (2022)		Kagan; Sotomayor (in part)	Roberts; Sotomayor
	Shoop v. Twyford	596 U.S. ___ (2022)		Sotomayor, Kagan	Roberts; Gorsuch
	United States v. Washington	596 U.S. ___ (2022)		Unanimous	
	New York State Rifle & Pistol Association, Inc. v. Bruen	597 U.S. ___ (2022)		Sotomayor, Kagan	Thomas; Alito; Kavanaugh; Barrett
	Dobbs v. Jackson Women's Health Organization	597 U.S. ___ (2022)			Alito; Thomas; Kavanaugh; Roberts
Signed jointly with Sotomayor and Kagan.
	Ruan v. United States	597 U.S. ___ (2022)		Roberts, Sotomayor, Kagan, Gorsuch, Kavanaugh	Alito
	Torres v. Texas Department of Public Safety	597 U.S. ___ (2022)		Roberts, Sotomayor, Kagan, Kavanaugh	Kagan; Thomas
