= 2021 term United States Supreme Court opinions of Brett Kavanaugh =

The 2021 term of the Supreme Court of the United States began October 4, 2021, and concluded October 2, 2022. This was the fourth term of Associate Justice Brett Kavanaugh's tenure on the Court.
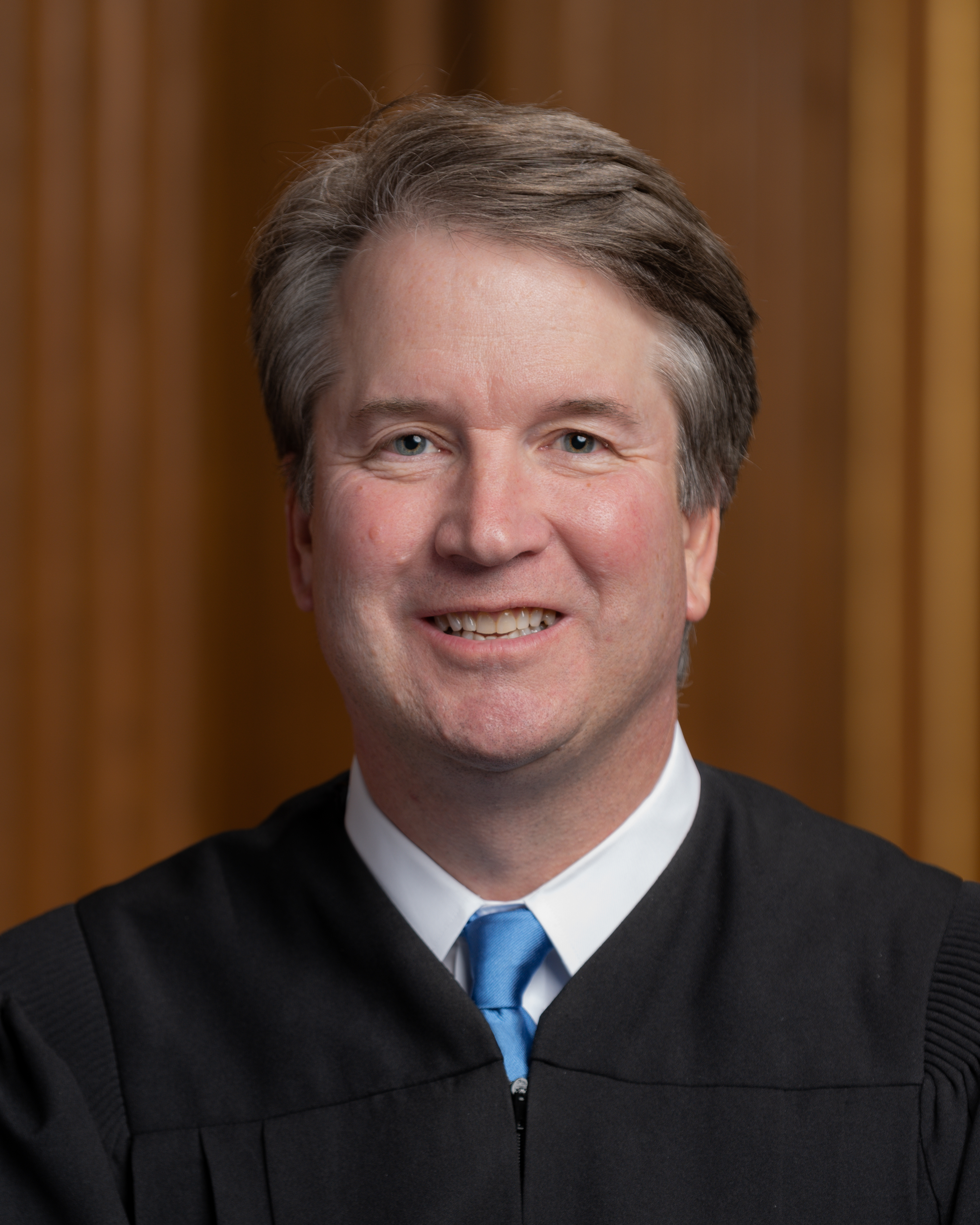

Brett Kavanaugh 2021 term statistics

5	Majority or plurality	11	Concurrence	2	Other
2	Dissent	0	Concurrence/dissent	Total =	20
Bench opinions = 15		Opinions relating to orders = 5		In-chambers opinions = 0
Unanimous opinions: 1		Most joined by: Roberts (9)		Least joined by: Sotomayor (2)

Type	Case	Citation	Issues	Joined by	Other opinions
	Trump v. Thompson	595 U.S. ___ (2022)			
Kavanaugh filed a statement respecting the Court's denial of application for stay of mandate and injunction pending review.
	Merrill v. Milligan	595 U.S. ___ (2022)		Alito	Roberts; Kagan
Kavanaugh concurred in the Court's grant of applications for stays.
	United States v. Zubaydah	595 U.S. ___ (2022)		Barrett	Breyer; Thomas; Kagan; Gorsuch
	Wooden v. United States	595 U.S. ___ (2022)			Kagan; Sotomayor; Barrett; Gorsuch
	Moore v. Harper	595 U.S. ___ (2022)			Alito
Kavanaugh concurred in the Court's denial of application for stay.
	Ramirez v. Collier	595 U.S. ___ (2022)			Roberts; Sotomayor; Thomas
	Austin v. U. S. Navy SEALs 1–26	595 U.S. ___ (2022)			Alito
Kavanaugh concurred in the Court's grant of application for partial stay.
	Thompson v. Clark	596 U.S. ___ (2022)		Roberts, Breyer, Sotomayor, Kagan, Barrett	Alito
	United States v. Vaello Madero	596 U.S. ___ (2022)		Roberts, Thomas, Breyer, Alito, Kagan, Gorsuch, Barrett	Thomas; Gorsuch; Sotomayor
	Cummings v. Premier Rehab Keller, P.L.L.C.	596 U.S. ___ (2022)		Gorsuch	Roberts; Breyer
	Shurtleff v. Boston	596 U.S. ___ (2022)			Breyer; Alito; Gorsuch
	American Hospital Association v. Becerra	596 U.S. ___ (2022)		Unanimous	
	Marietta Memorial Hospital Employee Health Benefit Plan v. DaVita Inc.	596 U.S. ___ (2022)		Roberts, Thomas, Breyer, Alito, Gorsuch, Barrett	Kagan
	New York State Rifle & Pistol Association, Inc. v. Bruen	597 U.S. ___ (2022)		Roberts	Thomas; Alito; Barrett; Breyer
	Dobbs v. Jackson Women's Health Organization	597 U.S. ___ (2022)			Alito; Thomas; Roberts; Breyer, Sotomayor, Kagan
	Becerra v. Empire Health Foundation, For Valley Hospital Medical Center	597 U.S. ___ (2022)		Roberts, Alito, Gorsuch	Kagan
	Concepcion v. United States	597 U.S. ___ (2022)		Roberts, Alito, Barrett	Sotomayor
	Oklahoma v. Castro-Huerta	597 U.S. ___ (2022)		Roberts, Thomas, Alito, Barrett	Gorsuch
	Biden v. Texas	597 U.S. ___ (2022)			Roberts; Alito; Barrett
	Grzegorczyk v. United States	597 U.S. ___ (2022)		Roberts, Thomas, Alito, Barrett	Sotomayor
Kavanaugh filed a statement respecting the Court's denial of certiorari.
