= 2021 term United States Supreme Court opinions of Elena Kagan =

The 2021 term of the Supreme Court of the United States began October 4, 2021, and concluded October 2, 2022. This was the twelfth term of Associate Justice Elena Kagan's tenure on the Court.
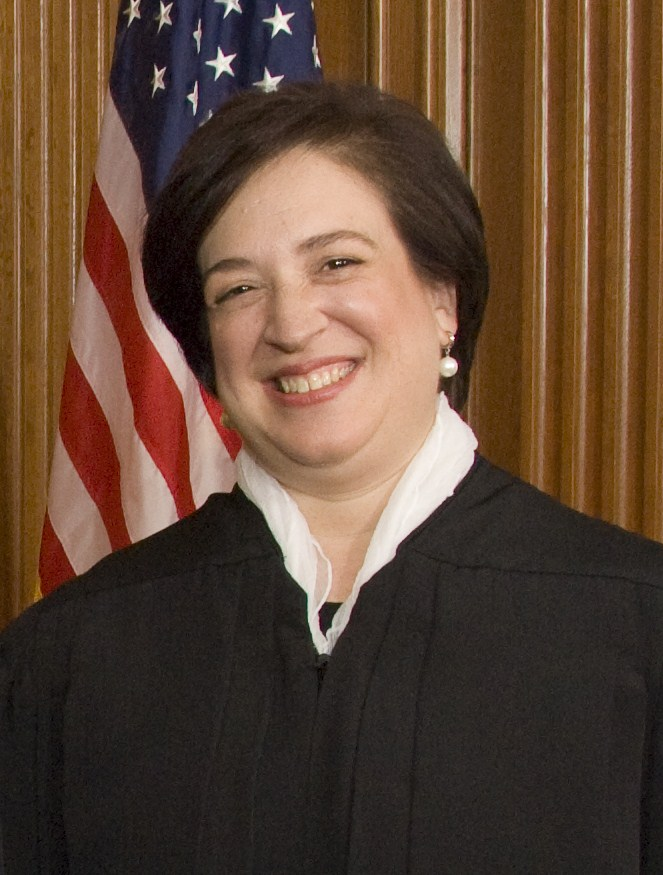

Elena Kagan 2021 term statistics

6	Majority or plurality	2	Concurrence	0	Other
10	Dissent	1	Concurrence/dissent	Total =	19
Bench opinions = 16		Opinions relating to orders = 3		In-chambers opinions = 0
Unanimous opinions: 2		Most joined by: Sotomayor (14)		Least joined by: Gorsuch (3)

Type	Case	Citation	Issues	Joined by	Other opinions
	National Federation of Independent Business v. Department of Labor, Occupational Safety and Health Administration	595 U.S. ___ (2022)			per curiam; Gorsuch
Kagan dissented from the Court's grant of applications for stays. Signed jointly with Breyer and Sotomayor.
	Hamm v. Reeves	595 U.S. ___ (2022)		Breyer, Sotomayor	
Kagan dissented from the Court's grant of application to vacate injunction.
	Merrill v. Milligan	595 U.S. ___ (2022)		Breyer, Sotomayor	Kavanaugh; Roberts
Kagan dissented from the Court's grant of applications for stays.
	United States v. Zubaydah	595 U.S. ___ (2022)			Breyer; Thomas; Kavanaugh; Gorsuch
	Cameron v. EMW Women's Surgical Center, P.S.C.	595 U.S. ___ (2022)		Breyer	Alito; Thomas; Sotomayor
	Wooden v. United States	595 U.S. ___ (2022)		Roberts, Breyer, Sotomayor, Kavanaugh; Thomas, Alito, Barrett (in part)	Sotomayor; Kavanaugh; Barrett; Gorsuch
	Badgerow v. Walters	596 U.S. ___ (2022)		Roberts, Thomas, Alito, Sotomayor, Gorsuch, Kavanaugh, Barrett	Breyer
	Louisiana v. American Rivers	596 U.S. ___ (2022)		Roberts, Breyer, Sotomayor	
Kagan dissented from the Court's grant of application for stay.
	Cassirer v. Thyssen-Bornemisza Collection Foundation	596 U.S. ___ (2022)		Unanimous	
	Brown v. Davenport	596 U.S. ___ (2022)		Breyer, Sotomayor	Gorsuch
	FEC v. Ted Cruz for Senate	596 U.S. ___ (2022)		Breyer, Sotomayor	Roberts
	Morgan v. Sundance, Inc.	596 U.S. ___ (2022)		Unanimous	
	Marietta Memorial Hospital Employee Health Benefit Plan v. DaVita Inc.	596 U.S. ___ (2022)		Sotomayor	Kavanaugh
	Vega v. Tekoh	597 U.S. ___ (2022)		Breyer, Sotomayor	Alito
	Nance v. Ward	597 U.S. ___ (2022)		Roberts, Breyer, Sotomayor, Kavanaugh	Barrett
	Dobbs v. Jackson Women's Health Organization	597 U.S. ___ (2022)			Alito; Thomas; Kavanaugh; Roberts
Signed jointly with Breyer and Sotomayor.
	Becerra v. Empire Health Foundation, For Valley Hospital Medical Center	597 U.S. ___ (2022)		Thomas, Breyer, Sotomayor, Barrett	Kavanaugh
	Torres v. Texas Department of Public Safety	597 U.S. ___ (2022)			Breyer; Thomas
	West Virginia v. EPA	597 U.S. ___ (2022)		Breyer, Sotomayor	Roberts; Gorsuch
