= 2021 term United States Supreme Court opinions of John Roberts =

The 2021 term of the Supreme Court of the United States began October 4, 2021, and concluded October 2, 2022. This was the seventeenth term of Chief Justice John Roberts's tenure on the Court.
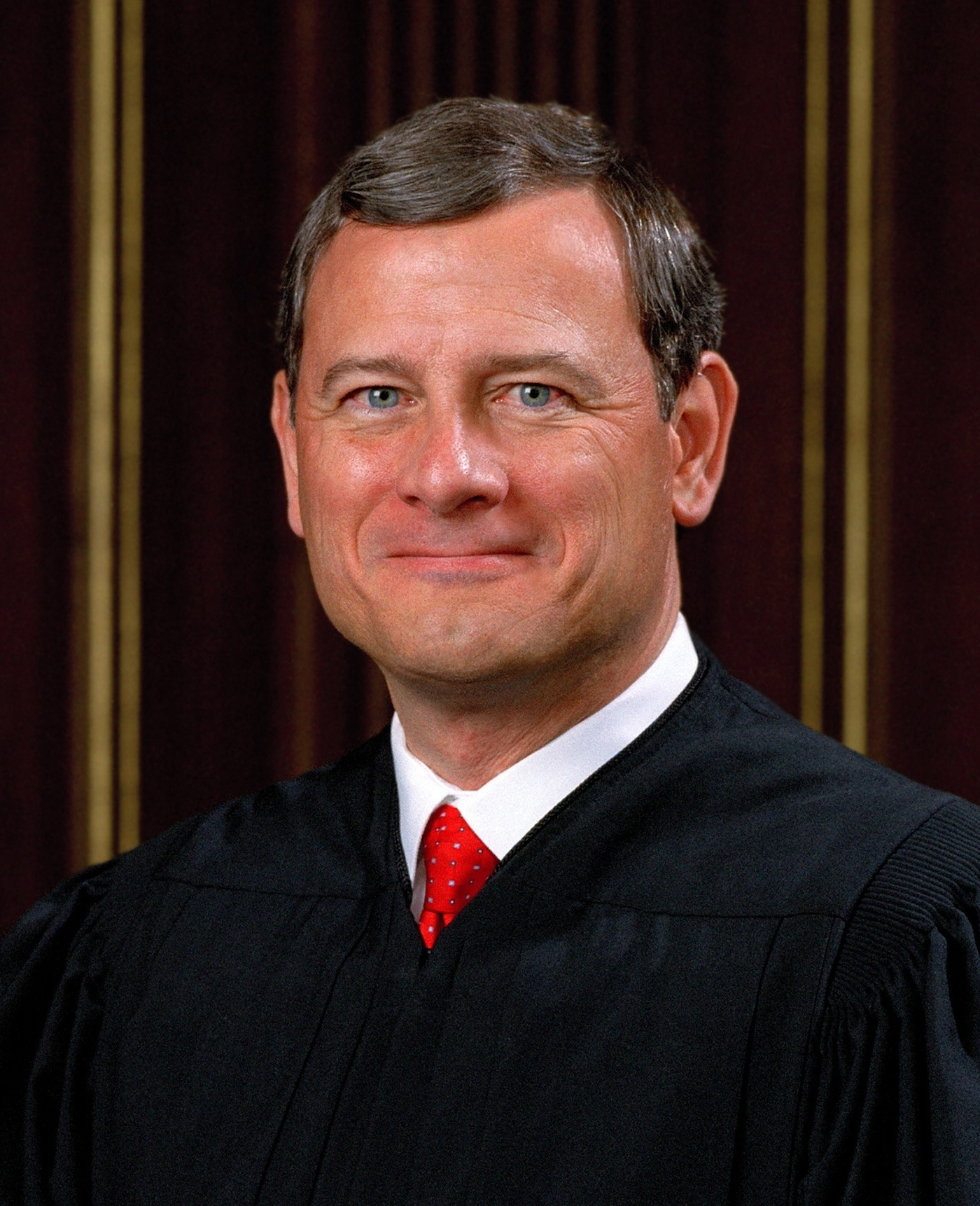

John Roberts 2021 term statistics

8	Majority or plurality	2	Concurrence	0	Other
2	Dissent	1	Concurrence/dissent	Total =	13
Bench opinions = 12		Opinions relating to orders = 1		In-chambers opinions = 0
Unanimous opinions: 1		Most joined by: Alito, Kavanaugh (9)		Least joined by: Breyer, Sotomayor, Kagan (4)

Type	Case	Citation	Issues	Joined by	Other opinions
	Mississippi v. Tennessee	595 U.S. ___ (2021)		Unanimous	
	Whole Woman's Health v. Jackson	595 U.S. ___ (2021)		Breyer, Sotomayor, Kagan	Gorsuch; Thomas; Sotomayor
	Merrill v. Milligan	595 U.S. ___ (2022)			Kavanaugh; Kagan
Roberts dissented from the Court's grant of applications for stays.
	Ramirez v. Collier	595 U.S. ___ (2022)		Breyer, Alito, Sotomayor, Kagan, Gorsuch, Kavanaugh, Barrett	Sotomayor; Kavanaugh; Thomas
	Cummings v. Premier Rehab Keller, P.L.L.C.	596 U.S. ___ (2022)		Thomas, Alito, Gorsuch, Kavanaugh, Barrett	Kavanaugh; Breyer
	FEC v. Ted Cruz for Senate	596 U.S. ___ (2022)		Thomas, Alito, Gorsuch, Kavanaugh, Barrett	Kagan
	Ysleta del Sur Pueblo v. Texas	596 U.S. ___ (2022)		Thomas, Alito, Kavanaugh	Gorsuch
	Arizona v. City and County of San Francisco	596 U.S. ___ (2022)		Thomas, Alito, Gorsuch	per curiam
	Carson v. Makin	596 U.S. ___ (2022)		Thomas, Alito, Gorsuch, Kavanaugh, Barrett	Breyer; Sotomayor
	Shoop v. Twyford	596 U.S. ___ (2022)		Thomas, Alito, Kavanaugh, Barrett	Breyer; Gorsuch
	Dobbs v. Jackson Women's Health Organization	597 U.S. ___ (2022)			Alito; Thomas; Kavanaugh; Breyer, Sotomayor, Kagan
	West Virginia v. EPA	597 U.S. ___ (2022)		Thomas, Alito, Gorsuch, Kavanaugh, Barrett	Gorsuch; Kagan
	Biden v. Texas	597 U.S. ___ (2022)		Breyer, Sotomayor, Kagan, Kavanaugh	Kavanaugh; Alito; Barrett
