= 2021 term United States Supreme Court opinions of Amy Coney Barrett =

The 2021 term of the Supreme Court of the United States began October 4, 2021, and concluded October 2, 2022. This was the second term of Associate Justice Amy Coney Barrett's tenure on the Court.
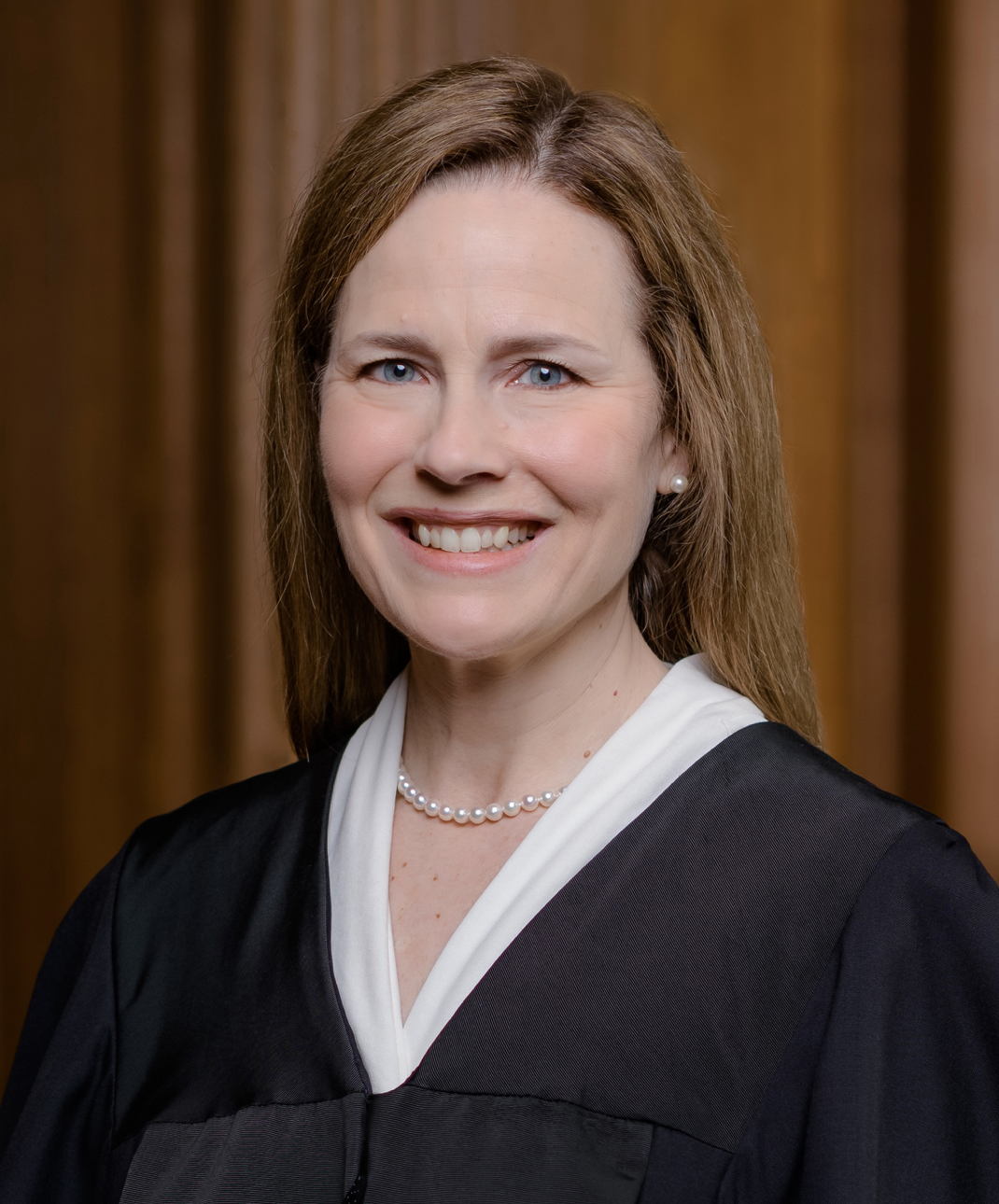

Amy Coney Barrett 2021 term statistics

6	Majority or plurality	5	Concurrence	0	Other
2	Dissent	0	Concurrence/dissent	Total =	13
Bench opinions = 12		Opinions relating to orders = 1		In-chambers opinions = 0
Unanimous opinions: 2		Most joined by: Thomas (8 in full, 1 in part)		Least joined by: Sotomayor (3)

Type	Case	Citation	Issues	Joined by	Other opinions
	Does 1–3 v. Mills	595 U.S. ___ (2021)		Kavanaugh	Gorsuch
Barrett concurred in the Court's denial of application for injunctive relief.
	Babcock v. Kijakazi	595 U.S. ___ (2021)		Roberts, Thomas, Breyer, Alito, Sotomayor, Kagan, Kavanaugh	Gorsuch
	United States v. Tsarnaev	595 U.S. ___ (2022)		Gorsuch	Thomas; Breyer
	Wooden v. United States	595 U.S. ___ (2022)		Thomas	Kagan; Sotomayor; Kavanaugh; Gorsuch
	Boechler v. Commissioner	596 U.S. ___ (2022)		Unanimous	
	Patel v. Garland	596 U.S. ___ (2022)		Roberts, Thomas, Alito, Kavanaugh	Gorsuch
	Denezpi v. United States	596 U.S. ___ (2022)		Roberts, Thomas, Breyer, Alito, Kavanaugh	Gorsuch
	ZF Automotive U. S., Inc. v. Luxshare, Ltd.	596 U.S. ___ (2022)		Unanimous	
	Viking River Cruises, Inc. v. Moriana	596 U.S. ___ (2022)		Kavanaugh; Roberts (in part)	Alito; Sotomayor; Thomas
	George v. McDonough	596 U.S. ___ (2022)		Roberts, Thomas, Alito, Kagan, Kavanaugh	Sotomayor; Gorsuch
	New York State Rifle & Pistol Association, Inc. v. Bruen	597 U.S. ___ (2022)			Thomas; Alito; Kavanaugh; Breyer
	Nance v. Ward	597 U.S. ___ (2022)		Thomas, Alito, Gorsuch	Kagan
	Biden v. Texas	597 U.S. ___ (2022)		Thomas, Alito, Gorsuch (in part)	Roberts; Kavanaugh; Alito
