= Remain in Mexico =

U.S. federal immigration policy

Migrant Protection Protocols (unofficially Remain In Mexico) is a United States immigration policy originally implemented in January 2019 under the administration of President Donald Trump, affecting immigration across the border with Mexico. Administered by the Department of Homeland Security, it requires migrants seeking asylum to remain in Mexico until their US immigration court date.

The policy was initially ended by President Joe Biden, and after some legal battles, the Supreme Court of the United States ruled on June 30, 2022, in Biden v. Texas, that the administration had the authority to end the policy. In December 2022, however, a federal judge blocked the program's ending. Remain in Mexico has been widely criticized by human rights organizations for exposing migrants to attacks while they awaited processing.

== Background ==
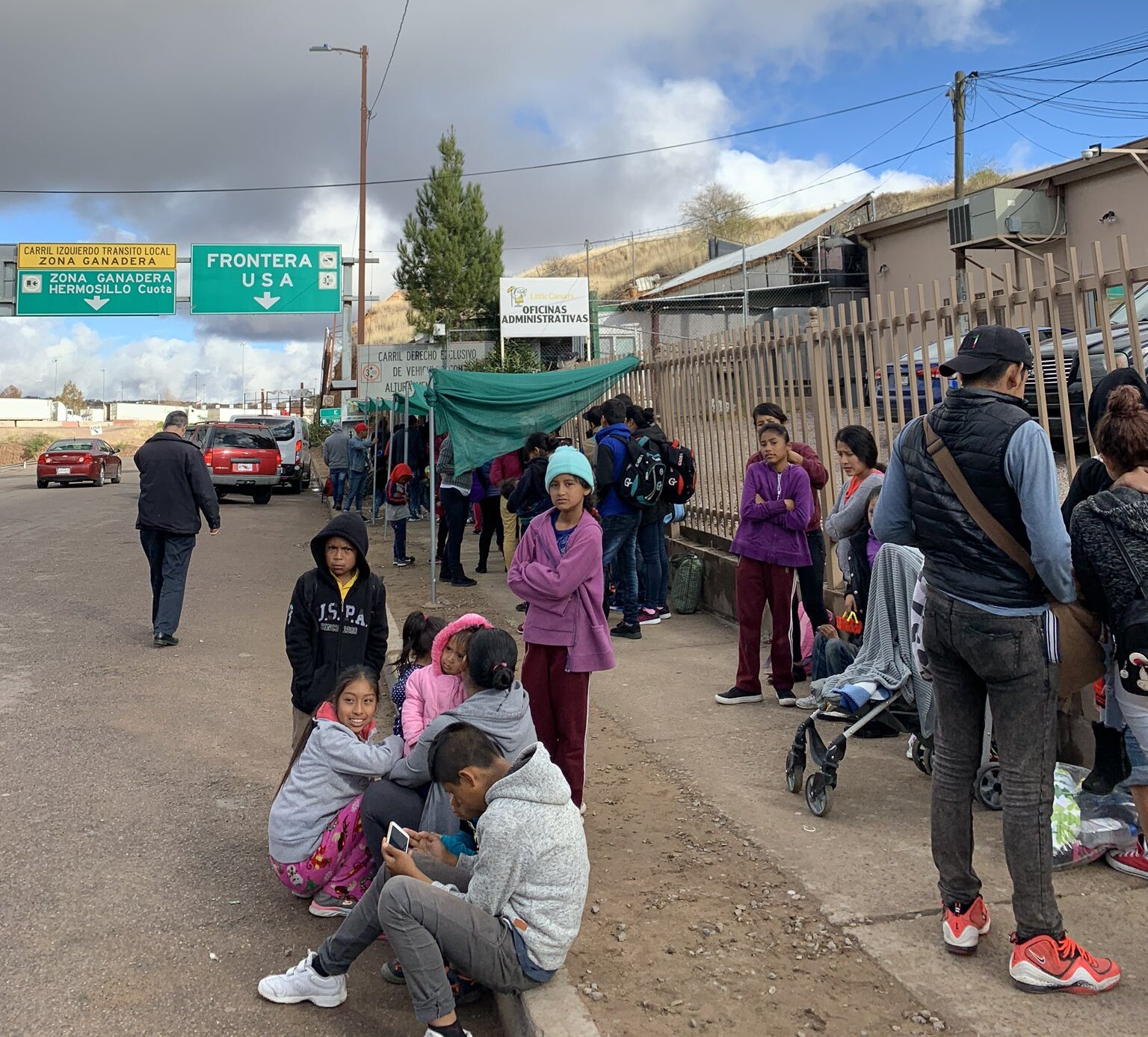
Migrants at the Kino Border Initiative in Nogales, Sonora, in 2020

In June 2018, the Department of Justice implemented a policy to deny that lack of protection from gender-based violence or gang violence were lawful bases for claiming asylum, overturning a 2016 Board of Immigration Appeals precedent. In his opinion, Attorney General Jeff Sessions wrote, "Generally, claims by aliens pertaining to domestic violence or gang violence perpetrated by nongovernmental actors will not qualify for asylum." In December 2018, federal judge Emmet G. Sullivan overturned the limitation on asylum as inconsistent with the Immigration and Nationality Act. Human Rights Watch reported that the program "is expelling asylum seekers to ill-prepared, dangerous Mexican border cities where they face high if not insurmountable barriers to receiving due process on their asylum claims." The policy is under review by the Ninth Circuit Court of Appeals, but the court has permitted it to continue during the review.

On November 9, 2018, then-U.S. president Donald Trump issued a proclamation suspending the right of asylum to any migrant crossing the US–Mexico border outside of a lawful port of entry. U.S. District Judge Jon S. Tigar of the Northern California District Court issued a November 19 injunction against implementing the policy, which was upheld by the US Supreme Court on December 21, 2018. In a separate case, Judge Randolph Moss of the DC District Court ruled in August 2019 to vacate the Interim Final Rule establishing the asylum ban for violating the Immigration and Nationality Act provides that a migrant may apply for asylum "whether or not at a designated port of arrival", as previously ruled by the Supreme Court.

== Announcement and implementation (2019–2021) ==
On December 20, 2018, the Department of Homeland Security announced the Migrant Protection Protocols, colloquially known as the "Remain in Mexico" program, a policy allowing the government to release migrants with asylum claims to Mexico to await their asylum hearings in the United States. It implemented the program with a policy memo released on January 25, 2019. The program was first rolled out at the San Ysidro, California, port of entry bordering Tijuana, Baja California. It was subsequently implemented in Calexico–Mexicali, El Paso–Ciudad Juarez, Brownsville-Matamoros, Laredo–Nuevo Laredo, Eagle Pass–Piedras Negras, and Nogales–Nogales.

According to DHS, "Aliens whose claims are found meritorious by an immigration judge will be allowed to remain in the U.S. Those determined to be without valid claims will be removed from the U.S. to their country of nationality or citizenship." By June 2019, over 12,000 migrants had been returned to Mexico under the policy. By September 2019, 47,000 people had been returned; and 57,000 by December 2019. Human Rights First found that at least 636 of those returned were victims of violent crimes in Mexico, including kidnapping, rape, torture, and assault. As of September 2019, fewer than 10,000 migrants in the program had their cases reviewed: 11 had been granted asylum; 5,085 cases were denied; and 4,471 cases were dismissed without being evaluated, often on procedural grounds. The asylum admission rate for the program, 0.1%, is dramatically lower than the 20% among other arriving immigrants.

On July 15, 2019, the Department of Homeland Security and the Department of Justice announced an interim final rule to take effect on July 16 that would rule foreigners who cross the US–Mexico border ineligible for asylum if they had not previously applied for asylum in countries they had traveled through, effectively barring asylum claims on the border from nationals of Central America and Cuba.

=== Litigation ===
The American Civil Liberties Union (ACLU) promised to immediately challenge the rule in court. On July 24, 2019, Judge Timothy Kelly of the DC District Court upheld the new rule, but that same day Judge Jon Tigar of the Northern California District Court issued a preliminary injunction against the rule in Innovation Law Lab v. Wolf, halting its implementation until the legal matters could be resolved. In September 2019, the U.S. Supreme Court stayed an injunction against the rule in Barr v. East Bay Sanctuary Covenant, allowing the rule to take effect while legal challenges were pending.

On March 4, 2020, the United States Court of Appeals for the Ninth Circuit ordered the "Remain in Mexico" program halted in the states under its jurisdiction, on the presumption that it violates statutory law; a lawsuit by various advocacy groups against the Department of Homeland Security is still awaiting final decision. On March 11, 2020, the U.S. Supreme Court stayed the injunction, allowing the Trump administration to continue the program while litigation continues.

== Termination, reinstatement, and Supreme Court ruling (2021–present) ==
In February 2021, the administration of President Joe Biden ended the "Remain in Mexico" policy, resuming admission of new asylum seekers and the approximately 25,000 with pending cases to the United States, and asking the Supreme Court to dismiss the appeal as moot. On August 14, 2021, a federal judge in Texas ordered a resumption of the Trump-era border policy that required migrants to remain in Mexico until their US immigration court date. The court ruled the reversal may have violated the Administrative Procedure Act, which prevents arbitrary regulations, because it did not consider various facts. A stay to block reenforcement of the "Remain in Mexico" policy was denied by both the Fifth Circuit Court of Appeals and the U.S. Supreme Court, compelling the administration to reinstitute the policy. In December, the administration announced they had agreed to requirements by Mexico for the resumption of returns, including COVID-19 vaccination, completion of cases within 180 days, and inquiries into fears of return to Mexico.

After the completion of negotiations with the government of Mexico, the Biden administration announced the resumption of the practice on December 2, 2021, with some alterations. On June 30, 2022, the U.S. Supreme Court ruled in Biden v. Texas that the Biden administration had the authority to end the policy.

The wind-down allowed migrants into the United States only after their next court hearing, and only if they were not deported. This resulted in thousands of people staying in Mexico for weeks or months after the program was officially ended, and many missed their court dates due to travel difficulties. One advocate called this delay "a little cruel", and the government was criticized for accepting over 21,000 refugees from the Russian invasion of Ukraine at the Mexican border during the same timeframe without this restriction.

On December 15, 2022, U.S. District Judge Matthew J. Kacsmaryk ruled that the program should stay in place while legal challenges play out, following the U.S. Supreme Court's decision to return the case to the lower courts. However, Kacsmaryk did not order the policy reinstated. In February 2023, Mexico's Ministry of Foreign Affairs announced it rejects any efforts to reinstate the policy for asylum-seekers.
