= Mississippi v. Tennessee =

- Supreme Court of the United States

Decided November 22, 2021
- Full case name: Mississippi v. Tennessee
- Docket no.: 22O143
- Citations: 595 U.S. 15 (more) 142 S.Ct. 31

Holding
- The waters of the Middle Claiborne Aquifer are subject to the judicial remedy of equitable apportionment.

Court membership
- Chief Justice John Roberts Associate Justices Clarence Thomas · Stephen Breyer; Samuel Alito · Sonia Sotomayor; Elena Kagan · Neil Gorsuch; Brett Kavanaugh · Amy Coney Barrett

Case opinion
- Majority: Roberts, joined by unanimous

Mississippi v. Tennessee, 595 U.S. 15 (2021), was a United States Supreme Court case in which the Court held that the waters of the Middle Claiborne Aquifer are subject to the judicial remedy of equitable apportionment.
