= Cassirer v. Thyssen-Bornemisza Collection Foundation =

- Supreme Court of the United States

Decided April 21, 2022
- Full case name: Cassirer v. Thyssen-Bornemisza Collection Foundation
- Docket no.: 20-1566
- Citations: 596 U.S. 107 (more)

Holding
- In a suit raising non-federal claims against a foreign state or instrumentality under the Foreign Sovereign Immunities Act, a court should determine the substantive law by using the same choice-of-law rule applicable in a similar suit against a private party.

Court membership
- Chief Justice John Roberts Associate Justices Clarence Thomas · Stephen Breyer; Samuel Alito · Sonia Sotomayor; Elena Kagan · Neil Gorsuch; Brett Kavanaugh · Amy Coney Barrett

Case opinion
- Majority: Kagan, joined by unanimous

Laws applied
- Foreign Sovereign Immunities Act

Cassirer v. Thyssen-Bornemisza Collection Foundation, 596 U.S. 107 (2022), was a United States Supreme Court case in which the Court held that, in a suit raising non-federal claims against a foreign state or instrumentality under the Foreign Sovereign Immunities Act, a court should determine the substantive law by using the same choice-of-law rule applicable in a similar suit against a private party.
