= Becerra v. Empire Health Foundation =

Becerra v. Empire Health Foundation, For Valley Hospital Medical Center
- Supreme Court of the United States

Argued November 29, 2021 Decided June 24, 2022
- Full case name: Becerra, Secretary of Health and Human Services v. Empire Health Foundation, For Valley Hospital Medical Center
- Docket no.: 20-1312
- Citations: 597 U.S. 424 (more) 597 U. S. 424 (2022)

Case history
- Prior: 958 F. 3d 873 (CA9 2020)

Holding
- In calculating the Medicare fraction, individuals entitled to Medicare Part A benefits are all those qualifying for the program, regardless of whether they receive Medicare payments for part or all of a hospital stay.

Court membership
- Chief Justice John Roberts Associate Justices Clarence Thomas · Stephen Breyer; Samuel Alito · Sonia Sotomayor; Elena Kagan · Neil Gorsuch; Brett Kavanaugh · Amy Coney Barrett

Case opinions
- Majority: Kagan, joined by Thomas, Breyer, Sotomayor, Barrett
- Dissent: Kavanaugh, joined by Roberts, Alito, Gorsuch

Laws applied
- 42 U.S.C. § 1395

Becerra v. Empire Health Foundation, For Valley Hospital Medical Center, 597 U.S. 424 (2022), was a United States Supreme Court case in which the Court clarified which patients hospitals are allowed to be reimbursed by Medicare for treating, and at what rate. In a 5–4 opinion written by Justice Elena Kagan, the Court held that "in calculating the Medicare fraction, individuals "entitled to [Medicare Part A] benefits" are all those qualifying for the program, regardless of whether they receive Medicare payments for part or all of a hospital stay."

== Opinion of the Court ==
Associate Justice Elena Kagan authored the majority opinion of the Court, which reversed the opinion of the United States Court of Appeals for the Ninth Circuit and remanded the case to that court for further proceedings consistent with the opinion.
