= Unicolors, Inc. v. H&M Hennes & Mauritz, L.P. =

- Supreme Court of the United States

Argued November 8, 2021 Decided February 24, 2022
- Full case name: Unicolors, Inc. v. H&M Hennes & Mauritz, L.P.
- Docket no.: 20-915
- Citations: 595 U.S. 178 (more)

Holding
- Lack of either factual or legal knowledge can excuse an inaccuracy in a copyright registration.

Court membership
- Chief Justice John Roberts Associate Justices Clarence Thomas · Stephen Breyer; Samuel Alito · Sonia Sotomayor; Elena Kagan · Neil Gorsuch; Brett Kavanaugh · Amy Coney Barrett

Case opinions
- Majority: Breyer, joined by Roberts, Sotomayor, Kagan, Kavanaugh, Barrett
- Dissent: Thomas, joined by Alito; Gorsuch (all but Part II)

Unicolors, Inc. v. H&M Hennes & Mauritz, L.P., 595 U.S. 178 (2022), was a United States Supreme Court case in which the Court held that a lack of either factual or legal knowledge can excuse an inaccuracy in a copyright registration.
