= Ruan v. United States =

Ruan v. United States Kahn v. United States
- Supreme Court of the United States

Argued March 1, 2022 Decided June 27, 2022
- Full case name: Xiulu Ruan v. United States; Shakeel Kahn v. United States
- Docket nos.: 20-1410; 21-5261
- Citations: 597 U.S. 450 (more) 142 S. Ct. 2370; 2022 WL 2295024; 2022 U.S. LEXIS 3089
- Argument: Oral argument

Holding
- Section 841’s “knowingly or intentionally” mens rea applies to the statute’s “except as authorized” clause. Once a defendant meets the burden of producing evidence that his or her conduct was “authorized,” the Government must prove beyond a reasonable doubt that the defendant knowingly or intentionally acted in an unauthorized manner.

Court membership
- Chief Justice John Roberts Associate Justices Clarence Thomas · Stephen Breyer; Samuel Alito · Sonia Sotomayor; Elena Kagan · Neil Gorsuch; Brett Kavanaugh · Amy Coney Barrett

Case opinions
- Majority: Breyer, joined by Roberts, Sotomayor, Kagan, Gorsuch, Kavanaugh
- Concurrence: Alito (in judgment), joined by Thomas; Barrett (Parts I–A, I–B, and II)

Laws applied
- Controlled Substances Act

Ruan v. United States, 597 U.S. 450 (2022), was a case decided by the Supreme Court of the United States.

== Background ==
From January 2011 to May 2015, Dr. Xiulu Ruan operated a clinic with Dr. John Couch, where they issued over 475,000 prescriptions for opioids. Both were indicted by the United States in 2016 pursuant to 21 U.S.C. § 841(a)(1), under the Controlled Substances Act. The United States argued that they prescribed medication with no legitimate medical purpose; the doctors, however, argued that they were prescribing in accordance with standard medical practice. The doctors requested the judge to inform the jury that if they had acted in "good faith", they should not be guilty under 21 U.S.C. § 841(a)(1). The judge disagreed and informed the jury that the doctors could be held guilty if their prescribing practices deviated from medical norms to the extent that they were unrecognizable as medicine. The jury ultimately found that the two doctors were guilty under 21 U.S.C. § 841(a)(1).

Ruan and Couch appealed to the United States Court of Appeals for the Eleventh Circuit and argued that the instructions to the jury in the district court were "legally erroneous." They argued that since they believed that their practice was in accordance with standard medical practice, the jury should be informed of the "good faith" defense. The Court of Appeals disagreed and affirmed the lower court's decision.

In a similar case, Dr. Shakeel Kahn was charged under 21 U.S.C. § 841(a)(1), for overprescribing Schedule II drugs. The United States provided the same argument, and Kahn rebutted with the same defense that he acted in "good faith." As in Ruan v. United States, the trial judge told the jury that the "good faith" argument could not stand if Kahn's actions were outside the bounds of standard medical practice. The jury agreed with the United States and handed down the guilty verdict. Kahn appealed to the United States Court of Appeals for the Tenth Circuit, which similarly, affirmed the lower court's decision.

In both cases, the defendant appealed to the Supreme Court for a writ of certiorari.

== Supreme Court ==
Certiorari was granted on November 5, 2021, and the two cases were consolidated. Oral arguments were held on March 1, 2022. On June 27, 2022, the court ruled unanimously to vacate the judgement of the Eleventh Circuit. Justice Stephen Breyer wrote the majority opinion, while Justice Samuel Alito (along with Justices Clarence Thomas and Amy Coney Barrett) concurred in the judgement.

=== Opinion of the Court ===
In his majority opinion, Justice Breyer wrote that the United States must prove beyond a reasonable doubt that the defendant "knowingly or intentionally" acted in an unauthorized manner, once the defendant meets the "burden of proof." The court rejected the government's "mens rea" standard in which the government argued that the statute should be read as requiring an "objectively reasonable good-faith effort," stating that such an interpretation would put the burden on the defendant to prove that their mental state was that of a "hypothetical 'reasonable' doctor." Breyer cited Elonis v. United States against the government's requirement for the accused to prove he is "reasonable." The court also rejected the "bad-apple" argument (holding that the additional burden on the government to prove would allow doctors to escape criminal liability much more easily) by stating that such an argument could be applied to almost all cases.
