= Berger v. North Carolina State Conference of the NAACP =

- Supreme Court of the United States

Argued March 21, 2022 Decided June 23, 2022
- Full case name: Philip E. Berger, et al. v. North Carolina State Conference of the NAACP, et al.
- Docket no.: 21-248
- Citations: 597 U.S. 197 (more) 2022 WL 2251306; 2022 U.S. LEXIS 3052
- Argument: Oral argument
- Decision: Opinion

Holding
- North Carolina legislative leaders are entitled to intervene in a federal constitutional challenge to the state's new voter identification law.

Court membership
- Chief Justice John Roberts Associate Justices Clarence Thomas · Stephen Breyer; Samuel Alito · Sonia Sotomayor; Elena Kagan · Neil Gorsuch; Brett Kavanaugh · Amy Coney Barrett

Case opinions
- Majority: Gorsuch, joined by Roberts, Thomas, Breyer, Alito, Kagan, Kavanaugh, Barrett
- Dissent: Sotomayor

Berger v. North Carolina State Conference of the NAACP, 597 U.S. 197 (2022), was a United States Supreme Court case related to the ability of state officials to intervene to defend the constitutionality of state laws.

== Background ==
In 2013, the North Carolina General Assembly passed, and Governor Pat McCrory signed, HB 589, a voter identification law. A divided panel of the United States Court of Appeals for the Fourth Circuit invalidated that law in 2016, and the Supreme Court later denied a petition for a writ of certiorari in 2017 after disputes about whether North Carolina's new governor, Roy Cooper, could withdraw the petition. In November 2018, the people of North Carolina adopted a voter identification amendment to the Constitution of North Carolina, and the General Assembly then passed SB 824 to implement the amendment in December 2018, over Cooper's veto.

After the HB 589 litigation, the General Assembly modified state law, again over Cooper's veto, to direct that the Speaker of the North Carolina House of Representatives and the President pro tempore of the North Carolina Senate be able to intervene in any litigation over the constitutionality of state law.

The North Carolina State Conference of the NAACP filed suit against SB 824 in the United States District Court for the Middle District of North Carolina in late December 2018. The General Assembly sought to intervene in defense of the law twice, believing North Carolina Attorney General Josh Stein was not adequately defending the law. The district court denied both motions, asserting that Stein would defend the law fairly. The General Assembly appealed, and a divided panel of the Fourth Circuit reversed in an opinion written by Judge A. Marvin Quattlebaum Jr. Judge Pamela Harris dissented. The court of appeals granted rehearing en banc, and affirmed the district court by a 9–6 vote. The General Assembly subsequently filed a petition for a writ of certiorari.

== Supreme Court ==
Certiorari was granted in the case on November 24, 2021. Oral arguments were held on March 21, 2022. On June 23, 2022, the Supreme Court reversed the Fourth Circuit in an 8–1 vote. Justice Neil Gorsuch wrote the majority opinion, while Justice Sonia Sotomayor dissented. The Supreme Court ruling means that Republican legislators in the state of North Carolina can act and advocate for a voter-identification law that they believe the state's attorney general, a Democrat, isn't defending adequately in court. The Court rejected the idea that courts should just presume that representation is adequate where the state law has explicitly authorized some other party to intervene in the process.
