= United States v. Taylor =

- Supreme Court of the United States

Decided June 21, 2022
- Full case name: United States v. Taylor
- Docket no.: 20-1459
- Citations: 596 U.S. 845 (more)

Holding
- An attempted Hobbs Act robbery does not qualify as a "crime of violence" under 18 U.S.C. § 924(c)(3)(A) because no element of the offense requires proof that the defendant used, attempted to use, or threatened to use force.

Court membership
- Chief Justice John Roberts Associate Justices Clarence Thomas · Stephen Breyer; Samuel Alito · Sonia Sotomayor; Elena Kagan · Neil Gorsuch; Brett Kavanaugh · Amy Coney Barrett

Case opinions
- Majority: Gorsuch
- Dissent: Thomas
- Dissent: Alito

Laws applied
- Hobbs Act

United States v. Taylor, 596 U.S. 845 (2022), was a United States Supreme Court case in which the Court held that an attempted Hobbs Act robbery does not qualify as a "crime of violence" under 18 U.S.C. § 924(c)(3)(A) because no element of the offense requires proof that the defendant used, attempted to use, or threatened to use force.
