= Egbert v. Boule =

- Supreme Court of the United States

Argued March 2, 2022 Decided June 8, 2022
- Full case name: Erik Egbert v. Robert Boule
- Docket no.: 21-147
- Citations: 596 U.S. 482 (more)
- Argument: Oral argument

Holding
- The holding in Bivens v. Six Unknown Named Agents does not extend to causes of action for either Boule's claims of First Amendment retaliation or Fourth Amendment excessive-force.

Court membership
- Chief Justice John Roberts Associate Justices Clarence Thomas · Stephen Breyer; Samuel Alito · Sonia Sotomayor; Elena Kagan · Neil Gorsuch; Brett Kavanaugh · Amy Coney Barrett

Case opinions
- Majority: Thomas, joined by Roberts, Alito, Kavanaugh, Barrett
- Concurrence: Gorsuch (in judgment)
- Concur/dissent: Sotomayor, joined by Breyer, Kagan

Egbert v. Boule, 596 U.S. 482 (2022), is a United States Supreme Court case in which the court declined to extend Bivens v. Six Unknown Named Agents.

== Background ==
Bivens v. Six Unknown Named Agents was a 1971 Supreme Court case that allowed for private citizens to seek monetary damages from federal agents when their rights were violated. However, the Bivens decision was based on a limited application of the Fourth Amendment to protect from illegal search and seizure, and since Bivens was decided, the Supreme Court has generally denied extending that decision to cover other causes of actions on the basis that only Congress could otherwise establish a pathway for such remedies.

Robert Boule is the owner of "Smuggler's Inn", a bed-and-breakfast in Blaine, Washington, near the Canada–United States border. Part of Boule's property extended into Canada, which allowed for illegal crossing of the border as well as a route for contraband. That made the United States Border Patrol keep close watch on the hotel, and Boule often worked with Border Patrol agents to notify them when persons of interest were staying at his inn to allow them to be detained by the agents.

In 2014, the Border Patrol became aware of a Turkish person that had arranged travel to the inn. When the guest arrived at the inn, the agent Erik Egbert approached the inn and looked to speak with the individual. Boule stopped Egbert and asked him to leave. Boule alleged that Egbert had used a show of force and unlawfully harassed him during the visit to the inn and later retaliated against him by reporting him to the Internal Revenue Service. The district court ruled for Egbert and found that the Supreme Court had held that under the prior Supreme Court case Bivens v. Six Unknown Named Agents, causes of action that would allow citizens to sue federal agents for violation of their rights could not be extended to First Amendment retaliation claims or Fourth Amendment claims touching on immigration issues. A panel of the United States Court of Appeals for the Ninth Circuit reversed. Twelve judges dissented from the denial of rehearing en banc, in opinions authored by Judges John B. Owens, Daniel Bress, and Patrick J. Bumatay.

Boule subsequently filed a petition for a writ of certiorari.

== Supreme Court ==
Certiorari was granted in the case on November 5, 2021, limited to "Whether a cause of action exists under Bivens for First Amendment retaliation claims" and "Whether a cause of action exists under Bivens for claims against federal officers engaged in immigration-related functions for allegedly violating a plaintiff’s Fourth Amendment rights." The Court declined to consider the question of whether Bivens should be "reconsidered".

The Court issued its decision on June 8, 2022. In a 9–0 decision, the court reversed the Ninth Circuit's ruling on the First Amendment retaliation claim. It split 6–3 on the Fourth Amendment claim. Justice Clarence Thomas wrote the majority. Justice Neil Gorsuch concurred in the judgment and called for Bivens to be overruled in its entirety. Justice Sonia Sotomayor wrote an opinion concurring in the judgment in part (as to the First Amendment claim) and dissenting in part (as to the Fourth Amendment claim). Thomas wrote that under Bivens, only Congress could authorize a damage remedy for either asserted First or Fourth Amendment violations for cases against federal agents, and cautioned from allowing the court to expand beyond the limited cases that Bivens allowed for. In the partial dissent, Sotomayor agreed that the alleged First Amendment violations could not go forward under Bivens, but argued that the Fourth Amendment claim should have been considered.

The decision reinforces the immunity of federal officers from lawsuits related to claims of violations of constitutional rights, unless Congress creates a right of action.
