= United States v. Tsarnaev =

- Supreme Court of the United States

Argued October 13, 2021 Decided March 4, 2022
- Full case name: United States v. Tsarnaev
- Docket no.: 20-443
- Citations: 595 U.S. 302 (more)
- Argument: Oral argument

Case history
- Prior: Death sentence vacated, 968 F.3d 24 (1st Cir. 2020), certiorari granted, 592 U. S. ___ (2021).

Holding
- A defendant is entitled to an impartial panel of jurors, not necessarily a panel of jurors who know nothing about the case. Death sentence reinstated.

Court membership
- Chief Justice John Roberts Associate Justices Clarence Thomas · Stephen Breyer; Samuel Alito · Sonia Sotomayor; Elena Kagan · Neil Gorsuch; Brett Kavanaugh · Amy Coney Barrett

Case opinions
- Majority: Thomas, joined by Roberts, Alito, Gorsuch, Kavanaugh, Barrett
- Concurrence: Barrett, joined by Gorsuch
- Dissent: Breyer, joined by Sotomayor, Kagan (except Part II–C)

United States v. Tsarnaev, 595 U.S. 302 (2022), was a United States Supreme Court case in which the Court held (6-3) that a defendant is entitled to an impartial panel of jurors, not necessarily a panel of jurors who know nothing about the case. The decision reinstated Dzhokhar Tsarnaev's death sentence for his role in the Boston Marathon bombing.

== Description ==
Principally, the majority opinion written by Justice Thomas emphasized that the abuse of discretion standard only allows reviewing courts to reverse decisions that are "manifestly unreasonable." He disposed of most arguments by saying the trial court was not so "manifestly unreasonable."

In dissent, Justice Breyer asserted that the trial court did not meet the abuse of discretion standard. In one part, Breyer alluded to his general opposition to the death penalty; Justices Kagan and Sotomayor declined to join that part of the dissent.
