= George v. McDonough =

- Supreme Court of the United States

Decided June 15, 2022
- Full case name: George v. McDonough
- Docket no.: 21-234
- Citations: 596 U.S. 740 (more)

Holding
- The invalidation of a Department of Veterans Affairs regulation after a veteran's benefits decision becomes final cannot support a claim for collateral relief permitting revision of that decision based on "clear and unmistakable error" under 38 U.S.C. §§ 5109A and 7111.

Court membership
- Chief Justice John Roberts Associate Justices Clarence Thomas · Stephen Breyer; Samuel Alito · Sonia Sotomayor; Elena Kagan · Neil Gorsuch; Brett Kavanaugh · Amy Coney Barrett

Case opinions
- Majority: Barrett
- Dissent: Gorsuch, joined by Breyer, Sotomayor (in part)

Laws applied
- 38 U.S.C. § 5109(A), 38 U.S.C. § 7111

George v. McDonough, 596 U.S. 740 (2022), was a United States Supreme Court case in which the Court held that the invalidation of a Department of Veterans Affairs regulation after a veteran's benefits decision becomes final cannot support a claim for collateral relief permitting revision of that decision based on "clear and unmistakable error" under 38 U.S.C. §§ 5109A and 7111.
