= Kemp v. United States =

- Supreme Court of the United States

Decided June 13, 2022
- Full case name: Kemp v. United States
- Docket no.: 21-5726
- Citations: 596 U.S. 528 (more)

Holding
- The term "mistake" in Federal Rule of Civil Procedure 60(b)(1) includes a judge's errors of law.

Court membership
- Chief Justice John Roberts Associate Justices Clarence Thomas · Stephen Breyer; Samuel Alito · Sonia Sotomayor; Elena Kagan · Neil Gorsuch; Brett Kavanaugh · Amy Coney Barrett

Case opinions
- Majority: Thomas, joined by Roberts, Breyer, Alito, Sotomayor, Kagan, Kavanaugh, Barrett
- Concurrence: Sotomayor
- Dissent: Gorsuch

Laws applied
- Fed. R. Civ. P. 60

Kemp v. United States, 596 U.S. 528 (2022), was a United States Supreme Court case in which the Court held that the term "mistake" in Federal Rule of Civil Procedure 60(b)(1) includes a judge's errors of law. Because Dexter Kemp's motion alleged such an error, it was cognizable under Rule 60(b)(1) and untimely under Rule 60(c)’s one-year limitations period.
