= Cummings v. Premier Rehab Keller, P.L.L.C. =

- Supreme Court of the United States

Argued November 30, 2021 Decided April 28, 2022
- Full case name: Jane Cummings v. Premier Rehab Keller, P.L.L.C.
- Docket no.: 20-219
- Citations: 596 U.S. 212 (more)
- Argument: Oral argument

Holding
- Emotional distress damages are not recoverable in a private action to enforce either the Rehabilitation Act of 1973 or the Affordable Care Act.

Court membership
- Chief Justice John Roberts Associate Justices Clarence Thomas · Stephen Breyer; Samuel Alito · Sonia Sotomayor; Elena Kagan · Neil Gorsuch; Brett Kavanaugh · Amy Coney Barrett

Case opinions
- Majority: Roberts, joined by Thomas, Alito, Gorsuch, Kavanaugh, Barrett
- Concurrence: Kavanaugh, joined by Gorsuch
- Dissent: Breyer, joined by Sotomayor, Kagan

Laws applied
- Rehabilitation Act of 1973, Affordable Care Act

Cummings v. Premier Rehab Keller, P.L.L.C., 596 U.S. 212 (2022), was a United States Supreme Court case related to the Rehabilitation Act of 1973 and the Patient Protection and Affordable Care Act.

== Background ==
Jane Cummings is deaf and legally blind. American Sign Language is her primary method of communication. In 2018, she sued Premier Rehab Keller, a company that offers physical therapy, under the Rehabilitation Act of 1973 and the Affordable Care Act for not providing her an ASL interpreter. She sought damages for emotional distress. The United States District Court for the Northern District of Texas dismissed her complaint, holding neither law allows people to recover damages for emotional distress. The United States Court of Appeals for the Fifth Circuit affirmed. Cummings filed a petition for a writ of certiorari.

== Supreme Court ==
Certiorari was granted in the case on July 2, 2021. Oral arguments were held on November 30, 2021. On April 28, 2022, the Supreme Court affirmed the Fifth Circuit in a 6–3 decision, with Chief Justice John Roberts writing the majority, and Justice Stephen Breyer writing the dissent. Because the structure of Title VI of the Civil Rights Act of 1964 is similar to the Rehabilitation Act and the ACA, this decision means people cannot recover emotional distress damages under that statute, either.
