= Shurtleff v. City of Boston =

- Supreme Court of the United States

Argued January 18, 2022 Decided May 2, 2022
- Full case name: Harold Shurtleff, et al. v. City of Boston, Massachusetts, et al.
- Docket no.: 20-1800
- Citations: 596 U.S. 243 (more)
- Argument: Oral argument

Holding
- 1. When the government opens up its property to the public for purely private speech, it does not necessarily constitute government speech.; 2. Permitting private religious expression on government property when that property is made a public forum for comparable private expression does not violate the establishment clause.; 3. Prohibiting the use of government property for private expression based solely on its religious content while allowing comparable private speech constitutes impermissible viewpoint discrimination and violates the First and Fourteenth Amendments.

Court membership
- Chief Justice John Roberts Associate Justices Clarence Thomas · Stephen Breyer; Samuel Alito · Sonia Sotomayor; Elena Kagan · Neil Gorsuch; Brett Kavanaugh · Amy Coney Barrett

Case opinions
- Majority: Breyer, joined by Roberts, Sotomayor, Kagan, Kavanaugh, Barrett
- Concurrence: Kavanaugh
- Concurrence: Alito (in judgment), joined by Thomas, Gorsuch
- Concurrence: Gorsuch (in judgment), joined by Thomas

Laws applied
- U.S. Const. amend. I

Shurtleff v. City of Boston, 596 U.S. 243 (2022), was a United States Supreme Court case related to the First Amendment to the United States Constitution. The case concerned the City of Boston's program that allowed groups to have their flags flown outside Boston City Hall. In a unanimous 9–0 decision, the Court ruled that the city violated a Christian group's free speech rights when it denied their request to raise a Christian flag over City Hall.

This decision received praise from religious liberty organizations as well as the Biden Administration and the American Civil Liberties Union (ACLU).

== Background ==
Under an application process, Boston, Massachusetts allowed groups to have their flags raised over one of the three flagpoles outside Boston City Hall. Flags that the city had approved ranged from those of other nations, to those celebrating the observance of Juneteenth.

A Christian group, Camp Constitution, and its director Hal Shurtleff applied to have the city fly a Christian flag over City Hall on Constitution Day in 2017. The group's mission is "to enhance the understanding of the country's Judeo-Christian moral heritage". The city denied their application, the first denial of about 284 applications, on concerns that it would violate the Establishment Clause as government speech by signaling that the city was endorsing a particular religion. This was the first request that the city ever received to raise a religious flag during its program. Shurtleff then sued the city for violating his free speech rights.

After the city prevailed in both the district court and the United States Court of Appeals for the First Circuit, Shurtleff appealed to the Supreme Court. In the meantime, the city discontinued accepting flag raising applications.

== Supreme Court ==
Certiorari was granted in the case on September 30, 2021. Mathew Staver presented oral argument before the Court on behalf of the Harold Shurtleff and Camp Constitution.

On May 2, 2022, the Court unanimously ruled that the City of Boston violated the First Amendment by denying Shurtleff's application to fly the flag.

The majority decision was written by Justice Stephen Breyer. He concluded that "the city's lack of meaningful involvement in the selection of flags or the crafting of their messages leads us to classify the flag raisings as private, not government, speech".

Justice Brett Kavanaugh wrote a one-paragraph concurring opinion to emphasize that a government does not violate the Establishment Clause when it treats religious persons or organizations equally with secular ones, but a government does violate the Free Speech Clause when it excludes religious persons or organizations.

Justice Samuel Alito wrote another concurring opinion, disagreeing with Breyer's analysis and that the simplest test in these types of cases is "whether the government is actually expressing its own views or the real speaker is a private party."

Justice Neil Gorsuch also filed a concurring opinion, writing that the city relied erroneously on the 1971 ruling in Lemon v. Kurtzman and the subsequent "Lemon test", which had been used to evaluate such government actions within the scope of the Establishment Clause but had been falling out of favor by the Court in the years prior. The Court would later officially overturn Lemon about eight weeks later on June 27, 2022, in its ruling in Kennedy v. Bremerton School District, with Gorsuch writing the majority opinion.

== Reactions ==
After the ruling, a spokesperson for Boston mayor Michelle Wu stated that they would review the court's decision. The Satanic Temple nevertheless submitted a request to fly their flag for "Satanic Appreciation Week" from July 23–29. Wu's predecessor, Marty Walsh, had been mayor at the time that the actions at matter in the case had occurred.

The Biden administration and the American Civil Liberties Union sided with the Christian group. The administration said that "The city cannot generally open its flagpole to flags from private civic and social groups while excluding otherwise similar groups with religious views".

The Christian flag was flown from the Boston flagpole at an event held by the plaintiff on August 3, 2022.

Boston paid $2.1 million in attorneys' fees and costs to Liberty Counsel, a Christian legal organization that spent five years representing Hal Shurtleff and Camp Constitution.

In 2024, Shurtleff and Liberty Counsel made statements against the Nashua city government for its denial of an application to fly a Pine Tree Flag. Shurtleff stated, "What the city of Boston did to us cost them well over $2.1 million in legal fees. Let’s hope for taxpayers’ sake that the city of Nashua is smarter than that."
