= Viking River Cruises, Inc. v. Moriana =

- Supreme Court of the United States

Argued March 30, 2022 Decided June 15, 2022
- Full case name: Viking River Cruises, Inc. v. Angie Moriana
- Docket no.: 20-1573
- Citations: 596 U.S. 639 (more)
- Argument: Oral argument

Holding
- The FAA does not allow the division of PAGA actions into individual and non-individual claims through an agreement to arbitrate.

Court membership
- Chief Justice John Roberts Associate Justices Clarence Thomas · Stephen Breyer; Samuel Alito · Sonia Sotomayor; Elena Kagan · Neil Gorsuch; Brett Kavanaugh · Amy Coney Barrett

Case opinions
- Majority: Alito, joined by Breyer, Sotomayor, Kagan, Gorsuch; Roberts (Parts I and III); Kavanaugh, Barrett (Part III)
- Concurrence: Sotomayor
- Concurrence: Barrett (in part and in the judgment), joined by Kavanaugh; Roberts (all but footnote)
- Dissent: Thomas

Laws applied
- Federal Arbitration Act

Viking River Cruises, Inc. v. Moriana, 596 U.S. 639 (2022), was a United States Supreme Court case related to the scope of the Federal Arbitration Act.

== Background ==
In its 2011 AT&T Mobility LLC v. Concepcion decision, the Supreme Court of the United States held the Federal Arbitration Act preempted state laws prohibiting waivers of class actions in employment agreements. California's Private Attorneys General Act allows employees to assert the interests of a group of similarly situated individuals in court. In its 2014 Iskanian v. CLS Transp. Los Angeles, LLC decision, the Supreme Court of California held the rationale of Concepcion did not extend to FAA preemption of PAGA claims. The United States Court of Appeals for the Ninth Circuit agreed in a 2–1 decision in Sakkab v. Luxottica N. Am., Inc. in 2015, and the Supreme Court denied certiorari in both cases. After Epic Systems Corp. v. Lewis, which reiterated the FAA's preemption of most state laws opposing arbitration, corporations again questioned the viability of PAGA claims.

Angie Moriana worked as a sales representative for Viking River Cruises from 2016 to 2017. Her employment contract included an arbitration clause, but after she left Viking, she sued the company under PAGA, alleging violations of the California Labor Code. Viking moved to compel arbitration, and both the trial court and the California Court of Appeal denied the motion. The California Supreme Court denied a petition for review, and Viking filed a petition for a writ of certiorari.

== Supreme Court ==
Certiorari was granted in the case on December 15, 2021. Oral arguments were held on March 30, 2022. On June 15, 2022, the Supreme Court reversed the California Court of Appeal, holding Moriana's PAGA claim was partially preempted by the Federal Arbitration Act.
