= Ramirez v. Collier =

- Supreme Court of the United States

Argued November 9, 2021 Decided March 24, 2022
- Full case name: John H. Ramirez v. Bryan Collier, Executive Director, Texas Department of Criminal Justice, et al.
- Docket no.: 21-5592
- Citations: 595 U.S. 411 (more)
- Argument: Oral argument

Case history
- Prior: Case No. 21-70004 (Fifth Circuit Court of Appeals)

Holding
- A Texas prison execution protocol banning all spiritual and religious advisors from being in an execution chamber, or touching a prisoner, during an execution is likely to violate the Religious Land Use and Institutionalized Persons Act's religious protections.

Court membership
- Chief Justice John Roberts Associate Justices Clarence Thomas · Stephen Breyer; Samuel Alito · Sonia Sotomayor; Elena Kagan · Neil Gorsuch; Brett Kavanaugh · Amy Coney Barrett

Case opinions
- Majority: Roberts, joined by Breyer, Alito, Sotomayor, Kagan, Gorsuch, Kavanaugh, Barrett
- Concurrence: Sotomayor
- Concurrence: Kavanaugh
- Dissent: Thomas

Laws applied
- Religious Land Use and Institutionalized Persons Act

Ramirez v. Collier, 595 U.S. 411 (2022), is a United States Supreme Court case related to the First Amendment to the United States Constitution and the Religious Land Use and Institutionalized Persons Act.

== Background ==
On July 19, 2004, 20-year-old John Henry Ramirez (June 29, 1984 – October 5, 2022), a former United States Marine, accompanied by two female acquaintances, murdered 46-year-old convenience store worker Pablo Castro outside a Times Market in Corpus Christi, Texas. Ramirez stabbed Castro a total of twenty-nine times, resulting in his death. The trio stole less than two dollars from Castro and fled the scene without entering the store. The two female acquaintances were captured a day later but Ramirez fled to Mexico and was not captured until 2008. He was convicted of murder and sentenced to death soon thereafter. Ramirez's female acquaintances, Angela Rodriguez and Christina Chavez, were also convicted for their roles in the murder. Rodriguez was convicted of murder and sentenced to life with parole while Chavez was convicted of aggravated robbery and sentenced to 25 years, but was paroled in 2023.

Ramirez was originally scheduled to be executed on September 9, 2020. That warrant was withdrawn. Years prior to this, he had been scheduled for execution on February 2, 2017, but his execution was stayed by the District Court.

In 2021, Ramirez filed suit to challenge the Texas execution protocol under the Religious Land Use and Institutionalized Persons Act ('RLUIPA') and the Free Exercise Clause of the First Amendment to the United States Constitution, seeking to have his minister be allowed to lay hands on his body and audibly pray during the execution process. The district court and the United States Court of Appeals for the Fifth Circuit both denied stays of execution, the latter over the dissent of Judge James L. Dennis. Ramirez then filed a petition for a writ of certiorari.

== Supreme Court decision ==
The Supreme Court stayed Ramirez's execution shortly before it was scheduled to occur on September 8, 2021, and granted his petition for a writ of certiorari. Oral arguments were held on November 9, 2021.

On March 24, 2022, the Supreme Court announced that in an 8–1 decision that it ruled in favor of Ramirez. Chief Justice John Roberts wrote the majority opinion, stating that Texas's denial of Ramirez's request "likely violated a federal law". The majority opinion was based on its belief that Ramirez was "likely to succeed in showing that Texas’s policy substantially burdens his exercise of religion" and further that Texas's "categorical ban..is inconsistent with his rights under RLUIPA".

== Execution ==
On October 5, 2022, Ramirez was executed by lethal injection at the Huntsville Unit. Before his death, Ramirez's spiritual advisor Dana Moore said a prayer while his right hand was on Ramirez's chest.

== See also ==
- List of people executed in Texas, 2020–present
- List of people executed in the United States in 2022

Executions carried out in Texas
Preceded by Kosoul Chanthakoummane August 17, 2022	John Henry Ramirez; October 5, 2022	Succeeded by Tracy Lane Beatty November 9, 2022
Executions carried out in the United States
Preceded by James Allen Coddington – Oklahoma August 25, 2022	John Henry Ramirez – Texas; October 5, 2022	Succeeded by Benjamin Robert Cole Sr. – Oklahoma October 20, 2022
