= City of Austin v. Reagan National Advertising of Austin, LLC =

- Supreme Court of the United States

Argued November 10, 2021 Decided April 21, 2022
- Full case name: City of Austin, Texas v. Reagan National Advertising of Austin, LLC
- Docket no.: 20-1029
- Citations: 596 U.S. ___ (more)
- Argument: Oral argument

Holding
- The distinction between on-premises signs and off-premises signs in the city of Austin’s sign code is facially content-neutral under the First Amendment.

Court membership
- Chief Justice John Roberts Associate Justices Clarence Thomas · Stephen Breyer; Samuel Alito · Sonia Sotomayor; Elena Kagan · Neil Gorsuch; Brett Kavanaugh · Amy Coney Barrett

Case opinions
- Majority: Sotomayor, joined by Roberts, Breyer, Kagan, Kavanaugh
- Concurrence: Breyer
- Concur/dissent: Alito (concurring in the judgment in part and dissenting in part)
- Dissent: Thomas, joined by Gorsuch, Barrett

Laws applied
- U.S. Const. amend. I

City of Austin v. Reagan National Advertising of Austin, LLC, 596 U.S. 61 (2022), was a United States Supreme Court case dealing with the application of zoning restrictions on digital billboards in the city of Austin, Texas. In a 6–3 ruling, the Court ruled that the Austin regulation against off-premise digital signs was content-neutral and thus should be reviewed as a facial challenge rather than a strict scrutiny following from the reasoning in Reed v. Town of Gilbert.

== Background ==
Austin is one of 350 cities and towns in Texas that enacted bans related to digital billboards along the sides of highways, generally as a long-term effect of the Highway Beautification Act as well as to avoid distractions for drivers along these highways. Austin's city codes includes a Sign Code that distinguishes between signage that is located on-premises, including signs in shop windows and mounted street signs on the property, and those off-premises, like billboards. On-premise signs are generally unregulated and may be updated and improved without any limitations, including improvements to digital signage. Off-premise signage, however, are restricted from such improvements. In addition, the city has banned the installation of new billboards.

Around 2017, two advertising companies that operated static billboard in Austin, Lamar Advantage Outdoor Company and Reagan National Advertising of Austin, sued the city as the city council denied over 80 applications to allow them to convert existing static billboards into digital billboards. The advertising companies contended that the city had allowed some digital signage such as that on the Austin Convention Center, and believed the ban was unconstitutional. They were joined by the Austin Police Association and supporters of local emergency services, believing that such digital billboards could be used to provide information such as Amber alerts. The case was first filed in a state district court before the city moved it to the United States District Court for the Western District of Texas in 2017. The district court selected to review the matter under intermediate scrutiny based on Metromedia, Inc. v. San Diego, rather than the strict scrutiny content-based standard of Reed v. Town of Gilbert, as the off-premise versus on-premise standard was content-neutral. Under this distinction, the District Court ruled for the city. Though the city amended the sign code in 2017 after litigation had started, the changes did not impact the case nor render it moot.

The advertisers appealed to the Fifth Circuit. In October 2020, the Fifth Circuit reversed the District's ruled in favor of the advertisers. The Fifth Circuit used the strict scrutiny standard of Reed to evaluate the city codes, as it determined that because to determine whether a sign was on or off-premises, one had to consider the message it was conveying, and that meant that this was a content-based restriction. Given this assessment, the rationale the city had given to maintain the ban against digital signage – to assure the safety of drivers and maintain the beauty of the landscape – were not sufficient reasons to violate the First Amendment rights of the advertisers, and thus ruled the city's sign code unconstitutional.

== Supreme Court ==
The city petitioned the Supreme Court to review the Fifth Circuit's ruling, stating that the court implied a content-based meaning in the city code that doesn't exist. The Court granted certiorari on June 28, 2021. The case was argued on November 10, 2021. On April 21, 2022, the court reversed the Fifth Circuit's decision in a 6–3 vote. The majority opinion was written by Justice Sonia Sotomayor and was joined by Chief Justice John Roberts and Justices Stephen Breyer, Elena Kagan, and Brett Kavanaugh. The majority opinion by Sotomayor, held that Austin's on/off premises regulation was written as content neutral under Reed, and thus should be reviewed through a facial challenge rather than strict scrutiny. The case was remanded to review the advertisers' challenge on based on the facial review of the regulation. Justice Breyer wrote a separate concurrence that argued that Reed's decision that applied strict scrutiny was wrong to begin with, and that instead there would be a better solution that used a measure of common sense in making the judgment if such regulations discriminated on content. Justice Samuel Alito wrote an opinion concurring in part and dissenting in part, agreeing that the Fifth Circuit's judgment should be reversed, but believed that there should be considerations when strict scrutiny should apply depending on the content of the signage.

The dissenting opinion was written by Justice Clarence Thomas, who had written the majority opinion from Reed. Thomas' dissent was joined by Justices Neil Gorsuch and Amy Coney Barrett. Thomas argued that the on/off premise regulation was content-based, since these messages would be likely to promote on or off-site services, and thus was unconstitutional through a strict scrutiny review under Reed as well as Hill v. Colorado.
