= Biden v. Texas =

- Supreme Court of the United States

Argued April 26, 2022 Decided June 30, 2022
- Full case name: Joseph R. Biden, Jr., President of the United States, et al. v. Texas, et al.
- Docket no.: 21-954
- Citations: 597 U.S. 785 (more) 142 S.Ct. 2528
- Argument: Oral argument
- Decision: Opinion

Case history
- Prior: Texas v. Biden, 554 F. Supp. 3d 818 (N.D. Tex. 2021); Stay denied, 10 F.4th 538 (5th Cir. 2021); Stay denied, 142 S. Ct. 926 (2021); Affirmed, 20 F.4th 928 (5th Cir. 2021); Cert. granted, 142 S. Ct. 1098 (2022)

Holding
- The Government's rescission of the Migrant Protection Protocols did not violate section 1225 of the INA, and the October 29 Memoranda constituted final agency action.

Court membership
- Chief Justice John Roberts Associate Justices Clarence Thomas · Stephen Breyer; Samuel Alito · Sonia Sotomayor; Elena Kagan · Neil Gorsuch; Brett Kavanaugh · Amy Coney Barrett

Case opinions
- Majority: Roberts, joined by Breyer, Sotomayor, Kagan, Kavanaugh
- Concurrence: Kavanaugh
- Dissent: Alito, joined by Thomas, Gorsuch
- Dissent: Barrett, joined by Thomas, Alito, Gorsuch (all but first sentence)

Laws applied
- Administrative Procedure Act; Illegal Immigration Reform and Immigrant Responsibility Act of 1996

In Biden v. Texas, 597 U.S. 785 (2022), Texas and Missouri attempted to sue the Biden administration for terminating the Migrant Protection Protocols (MPP), commonly known as the "Remain in Mexico" policy, but the Supreme Court ruled that the Biden administration legally possessed the authority to terminate the policy. By reversing lower court rulings, the Court affirmed that the Department of Homeland Security (DHS) acted within its legal discretion in ending the program.

== Background ==
=== Immigration Laws ===
Under federal immigration law, undocumented immigrants are "inadmissible" to the United States and are subject to expedited removal. In other situations arriving immigrants who may be inadmissible are placed in formal removal proceedings to appear before an immigration judge for a hearing. Immigrants in formal removal proceedings may be returned to a "contiguous territory" where they are entitled to apply for asylum.

In December 2018, the Trump administration announced the Migrant Protection Protocols (the "Remain in Mexico" policy) requiring some undocumented asylum seekers to "remain in Mexico" while officials reviewed their case. After a policy guidance was issued on January 25, a lawsuit was filed in California by Innovation Law Lab, an immigration rights organization, to argue that the contiguous territory provision did not apply to undocumented immigrants subject to expedited removal.

=== Innovation Law Lab v. Wolf ===
In April 2019, the United States District Court for the Northern District of California enjoined the implementation of the MPP expansion.

In May 2019, the United States Court of Appeals for the Ninth Circuit stayed the preliminary injunction pending disposition of the appeal. The Mexican government reported in June 2019 that 15,079 people were awaiting immigration proceedings in Mexico under the MPP program.

In February 2020, the Ninth Circuit affirmed the preliminary injunction, over the dissent of Judge Ferdinand Fernandez, and in March, the same panel denied a request by the federal government to stay the injunction pending disposition of a petition for writ of certiorari in the Supreme Court of the United States.

The Supreme Court granted that request, with Justice Sonia Sotomayor dissenting. In October 2020, the Supreme Court agreed to hear the appeal. After President Joe Biden took office in January 2021, the Court held the case in abeyance.

The Supreme Court ultimately dismissed the case in June 2021 as moot following the Biden administration's formal termination of the program, leaving the Ninth Circuit's Injunction in place.

New Administration

President Biden immediately ordered his Acting Homeland Security Secretary, David Pekske, to create a mermorandum to mandate a 100 day deportation moratorium for majority of non citizens attempting to enter the United States. The Biden Administration wanted to handle immigration issues at a differently angle than the previous Trump administration and wanted to make changes to the way the immigration system operated.

By June 2021, the New Homeland Security Secretary Alejandro Mayorkas issued to terminate the MPP policy with a seven page memorandum. He had the decision to either modify or terminate the policy. He came to the conclusion that the policy lacked the ability to face major border issues and caused more harm by straining our connection to Mexico.

The Administration vacated the Ninth Circuit's judgment as moot, so in June 2021 the government was able to rescind MPP.

== Fifth Circuit ==
In April 2021, Texas and Missouri challenged the rescission of MPP in the United States District Court for the Northern District of Texas. In August, Judge Matthew J. Kacsmaryk held the rescission of MPP was arbitrary and capricious, agreeing with the states that allowing asylum seekers to stay within the United States imposed undue costs on these states, and issued a permanent injunction. The United States Court of Appeals for the Fifth Circuit denied a stay pending appeal, as did the Supreme Court in a 6-3 order citing the Supreme Court's 2020 decision Department of Homeland Security v. Regents of the University of California.

Kacasmarky reinforced MPP to continue until the Administration found another way to detain all undocumented immigrants under proper detention. With more efforts to terminate MPP, Mayorkas issued another memorandum in October 2021 that contained thirty-eight pages expanding on more explanations to end the policy.

In December, the Fifth Circuit again ruled against the federal government, this time on the merits of the appeal. The Court discussed that the appeal only reinstated the same ideas and no final execution plan was developed. Kacsmaryk supposed that federal law required immigrants claiming asylum to remain in Mexico when they could not be detained in the United States. However, the immigration statute allows other alternatives that Kacsmaryk did not consider in his opinion.

The federal government filed a petition for a writ of certiorari. Certiorari was granted on February 18, 2022 for the statutory question.

== Supreme Court ==
Certiorari was granted in the case on February 18, 2022. Oral arguments were held on April 26, 2022. On June 30, 2022, the Supreme Court reversed the Fifth Circuit by a 5–4 vote and held that the federal government has the authority to revoke the Migrant Protection Protocols. It was ruled that the 1996 law which amended the Immigration and Nationality Act, and which was used to justify the authority Congress had over the Remain in Mexico policy, did not deny the President the authority to end the protocols. The INA has loose phrasing like “may return” noncitizen immigrants to a contiguous territory which the Court decided was not a mandatory law. The Court also came to conclusion that less of the MPP policy would strengthen diplomacy with Mexico.

== Aftermath ==
The case was then returned to the lower courts for additional proceedings determining whether the Biden administration's action was "arbitrary and capricious" in violation of the Administrative Procedure Act, which governs how federal agencies develop and issue regulations. On December 15, 2022, U.S. district judge Matthew Kacsmaryk prevented the Biden administration from officially ending the program by ruling that the policy should stay in place while legal challenges play out. However, Kacsmaryk did not order the policy reinstated. In February 2023, Mexico's Ministry of Foreign Affairs announced it rejects any efforts to reinstate the policy for asylum-seekers. In May of 2023, The Biden administration abandoned its appeal of the second halt put in place by lower counts, acknowledging the frivolousness of ongoing litigation in that specific venue while pursuing final administration termination actions. As of 2025 the case remains in limbo pending final administrative changes.
