= Cameron v. EMW Women's Surgical Center, P.S.C. =

Cameron v. EMW Women’s Surgical Center, P.S.C.
- Supreme Court of the United States

Argued October 12, 2021 Decided March 3, 2022
- Full case name: Daniel Cameron, Attorney General of Kentucky v. EMW Women's Surgical Center, P.S.C., et al.
- Docket no.: 20-601
- Citations: 595 U.S. 267 (more) 142 S. Ct. 1002; 212 L. Ed. 2d 114; 2022 U.S. LEXIS 1324
- Argument: Oral argument
- Decision: Opinion

Holding
- The lower court erred by denying the attorney general's motion to intervene.

Court membership
- Chief Justice John Roberts Associate Justices Clarence Thomas · Stephen Breyer; Samuel Alito · Sonia Sotomayor; Elena Kagan · Neil Gorsuch; Brett Kavanaugh · Amy Coney Barrett

Case opinions
- Majority: Alito, joined by Roberts, Thomas, Gorsuch, Kavanaugh, Barrett
- Concurrence: Thomas
- Concurrence: Kagan (in judgment), joined by Breyer
- Dissent: Sotomayor

Cameron v. EMW Women's Surgical Center, P.S.C., 595 U.S. 267 (2022), was a United States Supreme Court case related to the ability of state officials to intervene to defend the constitutionality of state laws.

== Background ==
Governor of Kentucky Matt Bevin directed his secretary of health to defend Kentucky's dilation and evacuation abortion law in court. Andy Beshear defeated him in 2019, and ceased defending the statute after a divided panel of the United States Court of Appeals for the Sixth Circuit invalidated it on June 2, 2020, a few weeks before June Medical Services, LLC v. Russo was decided. Attorney General of Kentucky Daniel Cameron sought permission to intervene in defense of the law, but the court of appeals denied the motion and subsequent request to file a petition for rehearing en banc by a 2–1 vote. Judge John K. Bush dissented.

== Supreme Court ==
Certiorari was granted in the case on March 29, 2021, limited to the question of whether Cameron could intervene in defense of the law. The question presented of whether to remand the case in light of June Medical Services, LLC v. Russo was not granted. The Court heard oral arguments on October 12, 2021. On March 3, 2022, it reversed the Sixth Circuit by an 8–1 vote, holding that it should not have denied the Attorney General from intervening.

== See also ==
- List of United States Supreme Court leaks
