= Wooden v. United States =

- Supreme Court of the United States

Argued October 4, 2021 Decided March 7, 2022
- Full case name: William Dale Wooden v. United States
- Docket no.: 20-5279
- Citations: 595 U.S. 360 (more)

Holding
- Multiple criminal offenses arising from a single criminal episode do not occur on different "occasions" and thus count as only one prior conviction for purposes of ACCA.

Court membership
- Chief Justice John Roberts Associate Justices Clarence Thomas · Stephen Breyer; Samuel Alito · Sonia Sotomayor; Elena Kagan · Neil Gorsuch; Brett Kavanaugh · Amy Coney Barrett

Case opinions
- Majority: Kagan, joined by Roberts, Breyer, Sotomayor, Kavanaugh; Thomas, Alito, Barrett (all but Part II–B)
- Concurrence: Sotomayor
- Concurrence: Kavanaugh
- Concurrence: Barrett (in part and in judgment), joined by Thomas
- Concurrence: Gorsuch (in judgment), joined by Sotomayor (Parts II, III, and IV)

Laws applied
- Armed Career Criminal Act

Wooden v. United States, 595 U.S. 360 (2022), was a Supreme Court of the United States case dealing with the Armed Career Criminal Act (ACCA). In a unanimous decision, the court ruled that multiple criminal offenses that a person commits during a single criminal episode do not count as separate convictions when considering the number of prior convictions a criminal has under the ACCA.

== Background ==
In 1997, William Wooden was involved with the burglary of a self-storage space, breaking into ten adjacent units within a single night. He was convicted on ten counts of burglary and served an eight-year prison sentence. Later, in 2014, Wooden was arrested for possession of a rifle under Georgia law when a police officer, out of uniform and without a warrant, entered his home and discovered the rifle. The charges were later dismissed due to the irregularities of the discovery, but federal officers stepped in to charge Wooden for possession of firearms under the ACCA. While a first-time conviction under the ACCA would normally lead to a sentence of 21 to 27 months, federal prosecutors believed that the ten prior convictions from the storage burglary were separate "occasions" under the ACCA, and triggered the enhanced sentencing provision of the ACCA for criminals that have been convictions on three or more separate occasions, setting a minimum sentence of 15 years.

While Wooden argued that the ten burglary convictions should be treated as a single occasion for purposes of the ACCA, the United States District Court for the Eastern District of Tennessee found in favor of the government's argument, as this stance was based on current case law for the Sixth Circuit. The decision was upheld on appeal at the Sixth Circuit.

== Supreme Court ==
The Supreme Court granted Wooden's petition in February 2021. The case was argued on October 4, 2021.

The Court issued its decision on March 8, 2022. The judgement was unanimous, reversing the decision of the lower courts. The majority opinion was written by Justice Elena Kagan, joined in whole by Chief Justice John Roberts and Justices Stephen Breyer, Sonia Sotomayor, Brett Kavanaugh and all but Part II-B by Justices Clarence Thomas, Samuel Alito, and Amy Coney Barrett. Kagan wrote that based both on the legislative history of the ACCA and the ordinary meaning of "occasion", that the ten burglary convictions that Wooden had received were all within the same occasion. "Consider first how an ordinary person (a reporter; a police officer; yes, even a lawyer) might describe Wooden’s 10 burglaries — and how she would not", Kagan wrote.

While Justice Barrett wrote a concurrence in part and in the judgment which was joined by Justice Thomas, she wrote that she took issue with Justice Kagan's use of legislative history as part of the rationale. Kagan had pointed to a 1988 amendment where Congress had made it clear that they intended that the enhanced sentencing was to come from separate episodes by referring to a person that was convicted under the enhanced provisions of the ACCA after performing a stick-up of six people at the same time. Barrett stated this was too much of a stretch for statutory interpretation and that they should defer to what Congress explicitly stated in the law.

Justice Neil Gorsuch also wrote a concurrence in judgement, joined in the most part by Justice Sotomayor. Gorsuch wrote that Wooden's case calls for the use of the rule of lenity, deferring in favor of the defendant when there is ambiguity in criminal law. Gorsuch also expressed concern that the ACCA created enhanced penalties to be decided by a judge rather than by a jury, which may be a violation of the Fifth and Sixth Amendment.
