= United States v. Zubaydah =

- Supreme Court of the United States

Argued October 6, 2021 Decided March 3, 2022
- Full case name: United States v. Zayn al-Abidin Muhammad Husayn, aka Abu Zubaydah, et al.
- Docket no.: 20-827
- Citations: 595 U.S. 195 (more) 142 S. Ct. 959; 212 L. Ed. 2d 65; 2022 U.S. LEXIS 1325
- Argument: Oral argument
- Decision: Opinion

Questions presented
- Whether the Court of Appeals erred when it rejected the United States' assertion of the state-secrets privilege based on the court’s own assessment of potential harms to the national security, and required discovery to proceed further under 28 U.S.C. 1782(a) against former Central Intelligence Agency (CIA) contractors on matters concerning alleged clandestine CIA activities.

Holding
- The state secrets privilege applies to information that could confirm or deny the existence of a CIA detention site in Poland. United States Court of Appeals for the Ninth Circuit reversed and remanded with instructions to dismiss application for discovery under §1782.

Court membership
- Chief Justice John Roberts Associate Justices Clarence Thomas · Stephen Breyer; Samuel Alito · Sonia Sotomayor; Elena Kagan · Neil Gorsuch; Brett Kavanaugh · Amy Coney Barrett

Case opinions
- Majority: Breyer (except as to Parts II–B–2 and III), joined by Roberts, Kavanaugh, Barrett; Kagan (all but Parts III and IV, and the judgment of dismissal); Thomas, Alito (Part IV)
- Plurality: Breyer (Part III), joined by Roberts, Kavanaugh, Barrett
- Plurality: Breyer (Part II-B-2), joined by Roberts, Kagan
- Concurrence: Thomas (in part), joined by Alito
- Concurrence: Kavanaugh (in part), joined by Barrett
- Concur/dissent: Kagan
- Dissent: Gorsuch, joined by Sotomayor

Laws applied
- 28 U.S.C. § 1782

United States v. Zubaydah, 595 U.S. 195 (2022), was a United States Supreme Court case related to the state secrets privilege. Abu Zubaydah, an alleged Al Qaeda operative, was tortured by two Central Intelligence Agency (CIA) contractors in a black site in Poland. He sought testimony from these contractors in 2017, but the federal government blocked the request, arguing that any information about the black sites was classified. In a 7–2 vote, the Supreme Court ruled against Zubaydah.

== Background ==
Abu Zubaydah was captured by the United States in Pakistan in 2002 and has been alleged to be a member of Al Qaeda. While in custody he had been transferred to multiple sites, including several black sites operated by the Central Intelligence Agency (CIA), before he was transferred indefinitely to the Guantanamo Bay detention camp by 2003. While the information on these sites was classified, activities at one site in Poland became public knowledge after Zubaydah and his counsel requested an investigation in 2010 from Polish officials into his treatment while at a black site in Poland. The report found that Zubaydah had been subjected to waterboarding and other forms of torture at the black site under direction of two CIA contractors.

Zubaydah sought disclosures from the two contractors in 2017 through federal courts to testify to their role in his detention. The CIA objected, claiming that any information regarding the black site was classified and could not be disclosed, even if the responses that Zubaydah sought did not reveal anything about the site's location. Zubaydah countered that the site's general location in Poland had already been revealed to the public through other means. He prevailed in the district court and a panel of the United States Court of Appeals for the Ninth Circuit affirmed, over Judge Ronald M. Gould's dissent. Judge Daniel Bress, joined by 11 colleagues, dissented from the denial of rehearing en banc.

== Supreme Court ==
Certiorari was granted in the case on April 26, 2021. Oral arguments were heard on October 6, 2021. On March 3, 2022, a divided Court reversed the Ninth Circuit in a mostly 7–2 vote. The majority decision was written by Justice Stephen Breyer, joined in full by Chief Justice John Roberts and in part by Justices Brett Kavanaugh and Amy Coney Barrett. Breyer acknowledged that while information about the CIA black site in Poland had been identified in public, the type of information that Zubaydah sought "would tend to confirm (or deny) the existence of a CIA detention site in Poland", and thus there was reasonable cause for the government to consider any further confirmation a matter of national security, since this potentially could expose the existence of black sites in other countries.

Justice Clarence Thomas wrote a concurrence to the judgment which Justice Samuel Alito joined. Thomas agreed with the judgment of the majority, but believed that Zubaydah did not need the information he was requesting from the contractors to pursue his case. Justice Elena Kagan also wrote a concurrence, but stated the case should be remanded to the district court to review what information Zubaydah sought that could be separated from state secrets.

Justice Neil Gorsuch wrote the dissent, joined by Sonia Sotomayor. Gorsuch argued that the fact that Zubayduh was held at a black site in Poland between 2002 and 2003 was now public knowledge and thus no longer a state secret, and was concerned about the over-classification of information by the government. He also stated, in agreement with Kagan, that the case should be remanded to district court to separate out what information could be obtained without evoking any state secret privilege.

== See also ==
- Korematsu v. United States
