= 2021 term per curiam opinions of the Supreme Court of the United States =

The Supreme Court of the United States handed down nine per curiam opinions during its 2021 term, which began October 4, 2021 and concluded October 2, 2022.

Because per curiam decisions are issued from the Court as an institution, these opinions all lack the attribution of authorship or joining votes to specific justices. All justices on the Court at the time the decision was handed down are assumed to have participated and concurred unless otherwise noted.

== Court membership ==
Chief Justice: John Roberts

Associate Justices: Clarence Thomas, Stephen Breyer, Samuel Alito, Sonia Sotomayor, Elena Kagan, Neil Gorsuch, Brett Kavanaugh, Amy Coney Barrett

== Rivas-Villegas v. Cortesluna ==
- Full caption: Daniel Rivas-Villegas v. Ramon Cortesluna
- Citations: 595 U.S. 1
- Prior history: Cortesluna v. Leon, 979 F.3d 645 (9th Cir. 2020)
- Full text of the opinion: official slip opinion · FindLaw

595 U.S. 1
Decided October 18, 2021.
Daniel Rivas-Villegas was a Union City, California police officer who responded to a domestic violence call. A crying 12-year-old girl called 911 to report that she, her 15-year-old sister, and their mother had locked themselves in a room at their house out of fear that their mother's boyfriend, Ramon Cortesluna, would hurt them. Rivas-Villegas was dispatched to the home along with several other officers. They entered the home and confronted Cortesluna, ordering him to put his hands up and get on his knees. Cortesluna did so, and one of the officers noticed a knife in his pocket. The officer ordered him to stop moving, but Cortesluna moved his head and hands downward. The officer then shot two Bean bag rounds at him, and while he was subdued, Officer Rivas-Villegas approached and straddled Cortesluna, placing his knee on Cortesluna's back. Another officer removed the knife from Cortesluna's pocket, and both officers then handcuffed and arrested Cortesluna.

Cortesluna sued Rivas-Villegas, alleging that Rivas-Villegas used excessive force in how he subdued Cortesluna. The district court granted summary judgement to Rivas-Villegas, but the Ninth Circuit reversed that decision, holding that Rivas-Villegas was not entitled to qualified immunity because of a 2000 case that had a similar fact pattern. Judge Daniel P. Collins dissented, arguing that the facts of the earlier case and this one were different enough that qualified immunity could be granted. The United States Supreme Court agreed with Judge Collins that the two cases had different enough fact patterns, and thus reversed the Ninth Circuit's judgement that Officer Rivas-Villegas was not entitled to qualified immunity.

== City of Tahlequah v. Bond ==
- Full caption: City of Tahlequah, Oklahoma, et al. v. Austin P. Bond, ex rel. Dominic F. Rollie, Deceased
- Citations: 595 U.S. 9
- Prior history: Bond v. City of Tahlequah, 981 F.3d 808 (10th Cir. 2020)
- Full text of the opinion: official slip opinion · Justia

595 U.S. 9
Decided October 18, 2021.
Tenth Circuit reversed.

Police officer was entitled to qualified immunity when the officer stepped towards a person, the person retreated into their garage, the police cornered him inside, and the person grabbed a hammer and held it above his head while saying "I have done nothing wrong here, man. I am in my house. I'm doing nothing wrong" before the officers shot him to death.

== United States v. Texas ==
- Full caption: United States v. Texas, et al.
- Citations: 595 U.S. 74
- Full text of the opinion: official slip opinion · Oyez

595 U.S. 74
Argued November 1, 2021.
Decided December 10, 2021.
The Court dismissed the writ of certiorari as improvidently granted. The application to vacate stay was denied.

Sotomayor dissented without separate opinion.

== Biden v. Missouri ==
- Full caption: Joseph R. Biden, Jr., President of the United States, et al. v. Missouri, et al.
- Citations: 595 U.S. 87
- Full text of the opinion: official slip opinion · Justia

595 U.S. 87
Argued January 7, 2022.
Decided January 13, 2022.
Applications for stays granted.

Thomas filed a dissent, joined by Alito, Gorsuch, and Barrett. Alito filed a dissent, joined by Thomas, Gorsuch, and Barrett.

== National Federation of Independent Business v. Department of Labor, Occupational Safety and Health Administration ==
- Full caption: National Federation of Independent Business, et al. v. Department of Labor, Occupational Safety and Health Administration, et al.
- Citations: 595 U.S. 109
- Full text of the opinion: official slip opinion · Oyez · Cornell

595 U.S. 109
Argued January 7, 2022.
Decided January 13, 2022.
In the midst of the COVID-19 pandemic, the United States Occupational Safety and Health Administration (OSHA), acting under the direction of President Biden, issued an emergency rule requiring all employers with at least 100 employees to ensure that their employees had either been vaccinated for COVID-19 or show a negative test for COVID-19 at least once a week. This rule was created in an effort by the Biden administration to increase the vaccination rate across the country. Workers who did not comply with the rule would be fired, and employers that did not comply with the rule could be fined tens of thousands of dollars.

As soon as OSHA published its rule, plaintiffs in every appellate court jurisdiction had filed for an injunction to prevent the rule from going into effect. The cases were consolidated in the Sixth Circuit, but before the consolidation, a panel of judges in the Fifth Circuit enjoined the rule. The Fifth Circuit's order said that the rule was overburdensome, and cited separation-of-powers and non-delegation doctrine concerns. The Sixth Circuit, then hearing the consolidated cases, was asked by the plaintiffs to hear the case en banc and was asked by OSHA to lift the Fifth Circuit's stay. The Sixth Circuit denied the plaintiffs' request to hear the case en banc, and the ensuing three-judge panel agreed to dissolve the Fifth Circuit's stay of the rule, thus allowing it to go into effect.

The plaintiffs then appealed to the United States Supreme Court, which granted certiorari and heard oral arguments in the case on January 7, 2022. On January 13, 2022, the Supreme Court issued their opinion, holding that a stay of the vaccine mandate was warranted because the Occupational Safety and Health Act was not an explicit Congressional grant to OSHA of the power to unilaterally impose a mandate that was this sweeping.

Justice Gorsuch filed a concurrence, which was joined by Justices Thomas and Alito. In it, he agreed with the Court's decision and expounded on how the major questions doctrine and federalist principles helped to guide him in knowing that this was the correct result. He argued that this was not a case of which policies are good, but of who gets to govern, and in his view, the people who make the rules should be more accountable to the people who must live under those rules.

Justices Breyer, Sotomayor, and Kagan filed a joint dissent. They argued that due to the widespread nature of the COVID-19 pandemic, the Supreme Court should let administrative agencies that are specifically tasked with public health administer rules that are designed to protect the public health, and that courts should not step in as actively.

== Wisconsin Legislature v. Wisconsin Elections Commission ==
- Full caption: Wisconsin Legislature v. Wisconsin Elections Commission
- Citations: 595 U.S. 398
- Full text of the opinion: official slip opinion · Cornell

595 U.S. 398
Decided March 23, 2022.
After each decennial census, all 50 states are required to re-draw their state legislative districts so that the population of each district is proportional. After the 2020 United States census, Wisconsin's state legislature drew and passed proposed maps, which were vetoed by Governor Tony Evers. Deadlocked, both parties turned to the Wisconsin Supreme Court, which invited several parties and intervenors, including the governor and the legislature, to submit proposals that complied with the United States Constitution, the Wisconsin Constitution, and contained the fewest changes from the previously enacted maps. In a 4-3 decision, the Wisconsin Supreme Court chose the maps that Governor Evers submitted, which created seven majority-black districts, one more majority-black district than the previous maps contained. In adopting the Governor's proposed maps, Justice Brian Hagedorn wrote that the Court "cannot say for certain on this record that seven majority-Black assembly districts are required by the VRA," but concluded that there were "good reasons" to think that the VRA "may" require another majority-black district.

The Wisconsin Legislature appealed to the United States Supreme Court, which reversed the Wisconsin Supreme Court's decision, holding that a state must find that adding a majority-minority district is required under the Voting Rights Act, not simply that it would be allowable under the VRA.

Justice Sonia Sotomayor filed a dissent, which was joined by Justice Kagan. In it, she argued that this was not a case fit for summary reversal, as the VRA precedents that the majority claimed existed were "hazy at best."

== LeDure v. Union Pacific Railroad Company ==
- Full caption: LeDure v. Union Pacific Railroad Company
- Citations: 595 U.S. ___
- Full text of the opinion: official slip opinion

595 U.S. ___
Argued March 28, 2022.
Decided April 28, 2022.
Bradley LeDure was an employee of the Union Pacific Railroad Company when he slipped and fell on an oily walkway in a rail yard in Salem, Illinois. LeDure sued Union Pacific for negligence, claiming violations of the Locomotive Inspection Act and the Federal Employers Liability Act because the railroad did not maintain a hazard-free work environment. The District Court granted summary judgment for Union Pacific and dismissed LeDure's suit with prejudice. The District Court also found that the Locomotive Inspection Act did not apply because the equipment that LeDure slipped on was not "in use" at the time of the incident. LeDure appealed to the Seventh Circuit Court of Appeals, and a panel consisting of judges Bauer, Kanne, and Barrett affirmed summary judgement, agreeing that the rail equipment was not "in use" at the time that LeDure slipped. This interpretation of "in use" conflicted with the interpretations of the First, Second, Third, Fourth, Fifth, Sixth, and Eighth Circuit Courts of Appeals. The conflict created a circuit split, and LeDure appealed to the United States Supreme Court, which granted certiorari.

Between the decision of the Seventh Circuit in June 2020 and the granting of certiorari in December 2021, Amy Coney Barrett was elevated to the United States Supreme Court. She recused herself from hearing the case at the Supreme Court, likely because her sitting in review of her own decision would have created a conflict of interest. As a result, only the remaining eight justices heard oral arguments in March 2022. The Court split 4-4 in their decision, so a per curium opinion was issued and the Seventh Circuit's decision was affirmed by an evenly-divided Court.

== Arizona v. City and County of San Francisco ==
- Full caption: Arizona, et al. v. City and County of San Francisco, California, et al.
- Citations: 596 U.S. 763
- Full text of the opinion: official slip opinion · Oyez

596 U.S. 763
Argued February 23, 2022.
Decided June 15, 2022.
The Court dismissed the writ of certiorari as improvidently granted.

Roberts filed a concurrence, joined by Thomas, Alito, and Gorsuch.

== See also ==
- List of United States Supreme Court cases, volume 595
- List of United States Supreme Court cases, volume 596
