= List of United States Supreme Court leaks =

Politico publishing a draft majority opinion in Dobbs v. Jackson Women's Health Organization in May 2022 is considered to be the most significant leak of the Supreme Court's private deliberation.

The United States Supreme Court typically keeps all deliberations and draft opinions private while a case is pending. At the start of the publication process, the court releases a single slip opinion for the case. However, some instances of news leaks of private deliberations or draft opinions have occurred.

== 19th century ==
In 1852, ten days before the justices announced their ruling, the New-York Tribune published the decision in Pennsylvania v. Wheeling and Belmont Bridge Company. When the case returned to the Court two years later, the Tribune published the ruling ahead of time again.

In February 1857, Associate Justice John Catron informed President-elect James Buchanan that the Supreme Court would write in Dred Scott v. Sandford that Congress had no power to regulate slavery in federal territories. Catron wanted Justice Robert Cooper Grier, a Pennsylvanian, to join the majority in Dred Scott so there would be at least one Northerner, who would be in favor of the majority's decision. Buchanan wrote to Grier asking him to join the Court's majority, which Grier did. At his inauguration, Buchanan referred to the Dred Scott decision and said the issue of slavery would soon be "speedily and finally" settled by the Supreme Court. The Tribune also published a running account of deliberations in the case, with Justice John McLean suspected of being the leaker.

== 20th century ==
=== Ashton Embry leaks ===
The Department of Justice indicted Ashton Embry, a former clerk of Justice Joseph McKenna, in 1919 for leaking pending decisions to Wall Street traders, including a railroad patent case. Embry had resigned a few months earlier to become a baker. No insider trading laws existed then, so Embry was charged with depriving "the United States of its lawful right and duty of promulgating information in the way and at the time required by law and at departmental regulation." The case never went to trial after the government's chief witness was "accused of conspiring with the Germans during World War I." Ninth Circuit Judge John B. Owens told Politico in 2022 that Embry is the only known case where "someone financially benefitted from disclosing inside information at the Supreme Court".

=== Roe v. Wade ===
While Roe v. Wade was being deliberated, The Washington Post published an article on July 4, 1972, covering infighting by the justices, including an internal memo written by Justice William O. Douglas.

Once a decision was finalized, Larry Hammond, a clerk for Justice Lewis Powell, leaked it to Time, on the condition it would not be published until the ruling was public. The announcement was delayed, but Time was already scheduled to publish and hit newsstands anyways. Chief Justice Warren E. Burger was "livid", and asked the other justices to identify the leaker so they could be punished. Hammond confessed to Powell, offering to resign, but Powell rejected that offer, telling Burger that Hammond was double-crossed. Burger met with Hammond and forgave him, and would also meet with editors from Time.

The reporter who broke the story, David C. Beckwith, said in 2022 that he spoke with about 15 people for the story, including Hammond.

=== Other 1970s and 1980s leaks ===
In 1977, NPR's Nina Totenberg reported that by a 5–3 vote, the Court declined to review cases of three defendants in Watergate cases.

Two years later, Chief Justice Warren Burger reassigned a member of the Court's print staff after determining they leaked the results of multiple cases to Tim O’Brien, an ABC News correspondent. In 1986, O'Brien correctly reported the 7–2 vote in Bowsher v. Synar, but got the specific day the Court was expected to announce its ruling wrong, as Burger delayed the announcement, likely because of the leak.

In 1981, United Press International received a draft of an opinion for County of Washington v. Gunther, but withheld publication because it was "unable to establish the authenticity."

=== Planned Parenthood v. Casey ===
In June 1992, an issue of the newsmagazine Newsweek contained an account of the Court's deliberations in Planned Parenthood v. Casey, a case involving abortion. The article cited various unnamed sources, including clerks, and correctly predicted that "at least three of the nine justices are planning to draft opinions in Casey" and that the decision would be issued on June 29. In a June 10, 1992 memorandum to all law clerks, Chief Justice William H. Rehnquist admonished clerks to say nothing to the press about pending cases. The Rehnquist memo about the apparent leak became public in 2023, when the private papers of John Paul Stevens (who retired in 2010 and died in 2019) were released.

== 21st century ==
Multiple former law clerks leaked details about the 2000 Bush v. Gore decision to Vanity Fair in 2004.

In 2012, days after the ruling in National Federation of Independent Business v. Sebelius was announced, CBS News's Jan Crawford reported that Chief Justice John Roberts had switched his vote, from initially wanting to strike down the law in question, to eventually voting to uphold it.

In 2019, CNN reported on Roberts switching his vote in another high-profile case, Department of Commerce v. New York, which considered whether a question about citizenship status could be added to the 2020 United States census.

In 2022, during oral arguments in Arizona v. City and County of San Francisco, California, Justice Stephen Breyer commented that a claim was "pretty similar to what we just allowed in that case of the attorney general", inadvertently revealing the Court's decision in Cameron v. EMW Women's Surgical Center, P.S.C., eight days before it would be published.

In July 2022, Christian minister Rob Schenck, a former anti-abortion leader who had led a D.C.-based evangelical nonprofit group, sent a letter to Chief Justice Roberts saying that, in 2014, he had been told in advance that Burwell v. Hobby Lobby Stores, Inc. would be decided in favor of Hobby Lobby, and that the opinion would be authored by Justice Samuel Alito. Schenck reportedly obtained this information from a donor, Gayle Wright, who, with her husband, had dinner with Alito and his wife. Schenck gave interviews on the matter to the New York Times, which reported on it in November 2022, stating that "in months of examining Mr. Schenck’s claims, The Times found a trail of contemporaneous emails and conversations that strongly suggested he knew the outcome and the author of the Hobby Lobby decision before it was made public." Alito denied the allegation, and said his relationship with the Wrights was "casual and purely social."

In 2023, Joan Biskupic reported in her book Nine Black Robes that Chief Justice Roberts and Justice Anthony Kennedy had made negotiations with each other on two gay rights cases: Roberts would join Kennedy in granting, vacating, and remanding Pavan v. Smith, ruling that Arkansas could not prevent the name of a lesbian mother who had not given birth from appearing on her child's birth certificate; and Kennedy would join Roberts in granting the appeal of Masterpiece Cakeshop v. Colorado Civil Rights Commission. Biskupic also wrote that the two orders were deliberately announced on the same day: June 26, 2017.

In 2023, CNN reported that the justices left their first conference on Allen v. Milligan without a consensus on either side. However, after a series of negotiations between Chief Justice Roberts and Justice Brett Kavanaugh, the chief justice convinced Kavanaugh, who was "[a]mbivalent during early internal debate," to join him in holding that Alabama's congressional districts were likely illegally racially gerrymandered.

=== Dobbs v. Jackson Women's Health Organization ===
On May 2, 2022, Politico released a leaked 98-page draft opinion authored by Associate Justice Samuel Alito in a highly watched abortion case, Dobbs v. Jackson Women's Health Organization, which had five votes to overturn Roe v. Wade. The draft was from February, but Politico—and later, The Washington Post—reported that the five-vote majority was still intact. The authenticity of the draft was confirmed by Chief Justice John Roberts, who also directed the marshal of the Court, Gail Curley, to conduct an investigation into the source of the leak. It is unlikely that the leak violated any federal criminal laws, unless the draft was obtained by hacking, theft, or other unlawful means.

The final majority opinion released on June 24, 2022, was largely the same as the leaked draft, the main additions responding to the concurrence and dissent.

In January 2023, following an investigation led by the Marshal of the Supreme Court, the Court released a 20-page summary of its investigation. The analysis was independently reviewed by Michael Chertoff, a former judge and Cabinet secretary. The investigation failed "to identify ... by a preponderance of the evidence" the person or persons who leaked the Dobbs draft opinion. Investigators had reviewed computer network and printer logs and interviewed at least 97 court personnel. The investigation counted 82 staff members, in addition to the justices, who had access to the draft. Court staff were asked to provide sworn statements, but neither the justices nor their spouses were interviewed under oath or asked to provide affidavits.

==== New York Times report ====
In December 2023, the New York Times released a report about some of the details that led to the Dobbs opinion. In a January 2021 conference, the three liberal justices, Breyer, Sonia Sotomayor, and Elena Kagan, as well as Roberts, opposed granting the petition for certiorari in Dobbs, while the remaining five justices were in favor. Kavanaugh proposed that the Court wait until the spring until publicly deciding to hear the case, ensuring that it would be argued in the following term. This move was to avoid the appearance of moving too quickly after Ginsburg's death and the appointment of Amy Coney Barrett to the Court. Justices Clarence Thomas, Alito, and Neil Gorsuch were opposed to the idea, but Barrett said she would vote against granting certiorari if the case was to be heard during the current term. Despite the Court going along with Kavanaugh's plan, publicly granting the petition in May, Barrett ended up voting against hearing the case despite her earlier declaration. Barrett did join the majority in voting to overturn Roe.

Roberts reportedly tried to persuade Kavanaugh to join his opinion in Dobbs: to uphold the 15-week ban on abortion at the heart of the case without completely overturning Roe. Breyer, who was open to joining Roberts' opinion in order to at least partially save Roe, also joined these efforts; if one member of the majority joined their opinion, Supreme Court rules would have made Roberts' decision the controlling one, given that it was decided on narrower grounds.

In February, after Alito had written his draft of the majority opinion and first circulated it among the justices, Gorsuch gave it his approval within 10 minutes. Thomas and Barrett gave their assent the next morning, followed by Kavanaugh. Unusually, none of them suggested any changes to the draft. The fact that those justices gave their support to the opinion so quickly, given its length of nearly 100 pages, led the Times to suggest that Alito may have "pregamed it among some of the conservative justices, out of view from other colleagues."

The identity and motive of who leaked the draft remains unknown, though it was almost certainly someone inside the Court. Potential motives may have been to either expose the decision or ensure it.

=== Moyle v. United States ===
On June 26, 2024, the Court inadvertently posted a document to its website that appeared to be an opinion for Moyle v. United States. The opinion seemed to indicate that the court would temporarily allow abortions in medical emergencies in Idaho. The Court said in a statement that the document was "inadvertently and briefly" published, and that its final decision had "not been released" but would be presented in due course. The opinion was published the following day, with little to no change.

=== Shadow docket memos ===
Leaked internal memos from deliberations on whether to grant a stay in West Virginia v. EPA.

In April 2026, the New York Times released and reported on internal memos from 2016 between justices regarding West Virginia v. EPA, before a 5-4 Court controversially issued a stay, in what is now considered to be the first modern shadow docket decision relating to presidential initiatives. Law professor Stephen Vladeck had previously expected the memos to stay secret "until our grandkids can read the justices’ internal papers from that time period".

== See also ==
- Branzburg v. Hayes
- Brett Kavanaugh email leak
