= Dobbs v. Jackson Women's Health Organization =

2022 U.S. Supreme Court case on abortion

- Supreme Court of the United States

Argued December 1, 2021 Decided June 24, 2022
- Full case name: Thomas E. Dobbs, State Health Officer of the Mississippi Department of Health, et al. v. Jackson Women's Health Organization, et al.
- Docket no.: 19-1392
- Citations: 597 U.S. 215 (more) 142 S. Ct. 2228, 213 L. Ed. 2d 545, 2022 WL 2276808; 2022 U.S. LEXIS 3057
- Argument: Oral argument
- Decision: Opinion

Case history
- Prior: Summary judgment granted, Jackson Women's Health Org. v. Currier, 349 F. Supp. 3d 536 (S.D. Miss. 2018); Affirmed sub nom. Jackson Women's Health Org. v. Dobbs, 945 F.3d 265 (5th Cir. 2019); Cert. granted, 141 S. Ct. 2619 (2021)
- Subsequent: Final judgment issued, Jackson Women's Health Organization v. Dobbs (S.D. Miss. 2022)

Questions presented
- Whether all pre-viability prohibitions on elective abortions are unconstitutional.

Holding
- The Constitution does not confer a right to abortion; Roe and Casey are overruled; and the authority to regulate abortion is returned to the people and their elected representatives.

Court membership
- Chief Justice John Roberts Associate Justices Clarence Thomas · Stephen Breyer; Samuel Alito · Sonia Sotomayor; Elena Kagan · Neil Gorsuch; Brett Kavanaugh · Amy Coney Barrett

Case opinions
- Majority: Alito, joined by Thomas, Gorsuch, Kavanaugh, Barrett
- Concurrence: Thomas
- Concurrence: Kavanaugh
- Concurrence: Roberts (in judgment)
- Dissent: Breyer, Sotomayor, Kagan

Laws applied
- U.S. Const. amends. X, XIV; Mississippi Code § 41-41-191 (2018)
- This case overturned a previous ruling or rulings
- Roe v. Wade (1973); Planned Parenthood v. Casey (1992)

Dobbs v. Jackson Women's Health Organization, 597 U.S. 215 (2022), is a landmark decision of the United States Supreme Court in which the court held that the United States Constitution does not confer a right to abortion. The court's decision overruled both Roe v. Wade (1973) and Planned Parenthood v. Casey (1992), recognizing the authority of state governments to regulate any aspect of abortion that federal law does not preempt.

The case concerned the constitutionality of a 2018 Mississippi state law that banned most abortion operations after the first 15 weeks of pregnancy. Jackson Women's Health Organization—Mississippi's only abortion clinic at the time—had sued Thomas E. Dobbs, state health officer with the Mississippi State Department of Health, in March 2018. Lower courts had enjoined enforcement of the law. The injunctions were based on the ruling in Planned Parenthood v. Casey (1992), which had prevented states from banning abortion before fetal viability, generally within the first 24 weeks, on the basis that a woman's choice for abortion during that time is protected by the Due Process Clause of the Fourteenth Amendment to the U.S. Constitution.

Oral arguments before the Supreme Court were held in December 2021. In May 2022, Politico published a leaked draft majority opinion by Justice Samuel Alito; the leaked draft largely matched the final decision. On June 24, 2022, the Court issued a decision that, by a vote of 6–3, reversed the lower court rulings. A smaller majority of five justices joined the opinion overturning Roe and Casey. The majority held that abortion is neither a constitutional right mentioned in the Constitution nor a fundamental right implied by the concept of ordered liberty that comes from Palko v. Connecticut. Chief Justice John Roberts agreed with the judgment upholding the Mississippi law but did not join the majority in the opinion to overturn Roe and Casey.

The decision was divisive. Prominent American scientific and medical communities, labor unions, editorial boards, most Democrats, and many religious organizations (including many Jewish and mainline Protestant churches) opposed Dobbs, while the Catholic Church, many evangelical churches, and many Republican politicians supported it. Protests and counterprotests over the decision occurred. There have been conflicting analyses of the impact of the decision on abortion rates.

By returning regulating power over abortion to state governments, Dobbs led to profound cultural changes in U.S. society. After the decision, several states immediately introduced abortion restrictions or revived laws that Roe and Casey had made dormant. As of 2026, 21 states ban or restrict the procedure earlier in pregnancy than in the standard set by Roe, overwhelmingly in the Southern United States. In national public opinion surveys, support for legalized abortion access rose 10 to 15 percentage points by the following year. As of 2025, referendums on abortion rights have been held in 16 states.

== Background ==
=== Common law ===
Abortion in the common law is a point of historical debate. The majority opinion in this case writes: "At common law, abortion was criminal in at least some stages of pregnancy and was regarded as unlawful and could have very serious consequences at all stages." The dissenting opinion of Justices Breyer, Sotomayor, and Kagan also says: "Did the reproductive right recognized in Roe and Casey exist in '1868, the year when the Fourteenth Amendment was ratified'? [...] The majority says (and with this much we agree) that the answer to this question is no: In 1868, there was no nationwide right to end a pregnancy, and no thought that the Fourteenth Amendment provided one."

=== Constitutional right ===
In the 1973 landmark decision Roe v. Wade, (Note: Roe v. Wade. 410 U.S. 113, 153) the Supreme Court of the United States decided that the "concept of personal liberty" guaranteed by the Fourteenth Amendment included a woman's qualified right to terminate her pregnancy:

This right of privacy, whether it be founded in the Fourteenth Amendment's concept of personal liberty and restrictions upon state action, as we feel it is, or, as the District Court determined, in the Ninth Amendment's reservation of rights to the people, is broad enough to encompass a woman's decision whether or not to terminate a pregnancy.

The Court thus struck down dozens of state abortion restrictions. After Roe, the right to terminate a pregnancy pre-viability was a protected constitutional right that could be regulated or prohibited by state law only when the fetus became viable, because the state's interest in protecting a potential life met the constitutional standard only when the fetus was viable. Post-viability abortion restrictions under state law were still required to contain a health exception allowing abortions under specified circumstances.

The viability line has been a major point of controversy in the abortion debate. It was partly reaffirmed in Planned Parenthood v. Casey, a 1992 case that struck down Roe's pregnancy trimester framework in favor of the fetal viability standard, typically 23 or 24 weeks into pregnancy. Casey held that laws that restrict abortion before the fetus is viable and laws that create an undue burden on women seeking abortions and place a "substantial obstacle" are unconstitutional, while acknowledging that viability was a shifting standard that could change with advances in medical technology.

Fetal viability's usage as a standard was questioned in U.S. abortion-related cases after Casey, including by Justice Sandra Day O'Connor in her dissenting opinion in City of Akron v. Akron Center for Reproductive Health. These opinions argued that other scientific, philosophical, and moral considerations are involved. The dissenting opinion of Justices Breyer, Sotomayor, and Kagan in Dobbs concedes this point: "there was no nationwide right to end a pregnancy, and no thought that the Fourteenth Amendment provided one."

After Roe, there was a national political realignment surrounding abortion. The abortion-rights movement in the United States initially emphasized the national policy benefits of abortion, such as smaller welfare expenses, slower population growth, and fewer illegitimate births. The abortion-rights movement drew support from the population control movement, feminists, and environmentalists. Anti-abortion advocates and civil-rights activists accused abortion-rights supporters of intending to control the population of racial minorities and the disabled, citing their ties to racial segregationists and eugenicist legal reformers. The abortion-rights movement subsequently distanced itself from the population control movement and took up choice-based and rights-oriented verbiage similar to that in the Roe decision.

The political cohesion of the "Religious Right" in American politics is often credited to a unified moral stance against abortion, but there was no such consensus for some time. At the time of Roe, opposition to abortion was largely concentrated in the Catholic Church. Most Protestant denominations leaned in favor of or had no stance on it. Catholics and many Northern Democratic politicians supported an expansive welfare state, wanted to reduce rates of abortion through prenatal insurance and federally funded daycare, and opposed abortion. Billy Graham originally refused to join Francis Schaeffer's anti-abortion campaign. Even the notable anti-abortion ideologue James Dobson, founder of Focus on the Family, publicly acknowledged the moral ambiguity surrounding personhood controversies. Where Scripture was neutral, it was defensible for evangelical Christians to believe that "a developing embryo or fetus was not regarded as a full human being".

Beginning in the late 1970s, the anti-abortion movement in the United States gained support from many evangelical Protestants. By the 1980s their influence helped make opposition to abortion part of the Republican Party platform, as well as a litmus test for Supreme Court justice confirmations. Republican-led states enacted laws to restrict abortion, including abortions earlier than Casey's general standard of 24 weeks. The courts enjoined the enforcement of most of these laws.

=== Evolution of the composition of the Supreme Court ===
During the Roberts Court since 2005, there had generally been a 5–4 conservative majority with the potential to overturn Roe and Casey. But one of those conservatives, Anthony Kennedy, had been part of the controlling plurality opinion in Casey and was generally seen as a safe vote to uphold it. Among the other conservative and originalist court members were Samuel Alito, who had sat as a circuit judge on the three-judge appellate panel and dissented from the court's invalidation of the spousal notification in Casey; and Clarence Thomas, who believes the court's use of substantive due process to confer rights is a "legal fiction" and sees the Privileges or Immunities Clause as a superior vehicle for the incorporation of unenumerated rights. Chief Justice John Roberts was also considered part of the conservative majority, but he was a strong proponent of stare decisis, believing that even some wrongly decided cases should not be overturned, and a staunch defender of the Court's reputation.

In 2013, Senate Majority Leader Harry Reid invoked the "nuclear option", allowing judicial nominations except to the Supreme Court to be confirmed by a simple majority.

In 2016, Senate Republicans led by Majority Leader Mitch McConnell prevented then-President Barack Obama from filling the vacancy left by the death of Justice Antonin Scalia.

On April 6, 2017, the nuclear option was used again, this time by the Republican majority, extending the simple majority precedent to Supreme Court nominations, in order to enable cloture to be invoked on the nomination of Neil Gorsuch. This allowed President Donald Trump to fill the vacancy and initiated the ideological shift of the court with respect to abortion rights.

The court appeared to shift further in 2018, when Kennedy retired and was replaced by Brett Kavanaugh, a known Casey opponent. Because of Roberts's stated positions, he was considered the "swing vote" in abortion cases, but it was thought that his strong support for upholding even wrongly decided cases would make it difficult for Roe or Casey to be challenged. Nevertheless, several Republican-majority states passed bills restricting abortion, anticipating a potential shift in the Supreme Court and providing possible case vehicles for bringing the issue to it.

When Amy Coney Barrett replaced Ruth Bader Ginsburg in late 2020, the Court's ideological makeup shifted further, creating a 6–3 conservative majority and providing an opportunity to additionally limit or even overturn Roe and Casey by moving Roberts out of the "swing vote" role. Ginsburg had generally been in the majority of past Supreme Court cases that struck down stricter abortion laws. Conversely, Barrett held anti-abortion views; in 1998, she wrote in a law journal article that abortion is "always immoral".

Other factors also contributed to the Court's changing stance. During the Obama administration the Alliance for Defending Freedom (ADF) brought five successful cases to the Supreme Court to give more weight to religious faith and challenged previous case law on the separation of church and state. After Trump's inauguration, the ADF and the Federalist Society reportedly began working in secret with Christian and conservative politicians and lawyers to establish a network, similar to the ACLU's, to push challenges to Roe while introducing state legislation to reduce the period for abortion to 15 weeks or less. These bills were to be introduced in states where they would have a high chance of being upheld by state and lower federal courts, so as to set up a case vehicle to reach the Supreme Court. They found the most likely route to success with Mississippi, given that it had only one abortion center, Jackson's Women's Health, which performed abortions only up to the 16th week. The ADF believed that while a 15-week bill would affect only a small number of women, it would be the most palatable to the Supreme Court in a split-circuit scenario.

== Gestational Age Act ==
In March 2018, the Mississippi Legislature passed the Gestational Age Act, which banned any abortion operation after the first 15 weeks of pregnancy, with exceptions for a medical emergency or severe fetal abnormality but none for cases of rape or incest. The medical emergency exception allows abortions to save the life of a pregnant woman and in situations where "the continuation of the pregnancy will create a serious risk of substantial and irreversible impairment of a major bodily function". The severe fetal abnormality exception allows abortions of fetuses whose defects will leave them incapable of living outside the womb.

The legislature justified this prohibition on the basis that abortions for nontherapeutic or elective reasons were "a barbaric practice, dangerous for the maternal patient, and demeaning to the medical profession". Another basis was that the abortion procedures forbidden under the Act were said by the legislature to carry "significant physical and psychological risks", and could cause various medical complications.

The legislation was based on a model written by Alliance Defending Freedom, a Christian conservative legal organization. The model legislation was created with the intent to make it law in the states within the traditionally conservative Fifth Circuit Court of Appeals (Louisiana, Mississippi, and Texas), and a means to bring abortion rights to the Supreme Court. Governor Phil Bryant signed the bill into law, saying he was "committed to making Mississippi the safest place in America for an unborn child, and this bill will help us achieve that goal". He added, "We'll probably be sued here in about a half hour, and that'll be fine with me. It is worth fighting over."

=== Lower courts ===
Within a day of the Gestational Age Act's passage, Mississippi's only abortion clinic, Jackson Women's Health Organization, and one of its doctors, Sacheen Carr-Ellis, sued state officials Thomas E. Dobbs, state health officer with the Mississippi State Department of Health, and Kenneth Cleveland, executive director of the Mississippi State Board of Medical Licensure, to challenge the Act's constitutionality. The clinic performed surgical abortions up to 16 weeks' gestation and was represented in court by the Center for Reproductive Rights. The case was heard by Judge Carlton W. Reeves of the U.S. District Court for the Southern District of Mississippi. In November 2018, Reeves ruled for the clinic and placed an injunction on Mississippi enjoining it from enforcing the Act. Reeves wrote that, based on evidence that viability of the fetus begins between 23 and 24 weeks, Mississippi had "no legitimate state interest strong enough, prior to viability, to justify a ban on abortions". Dobbs sought to have the judges consider whether fetal pain might be possible after 15 weeks, but the District Court ruled his evidence as "inadmissible and irrelevant".

The state appealed to the Fifth Circuit, which upheld Reeves's ruling in a 3–0 decision in December 2019. Senior Circuit Judge Patrick Higginbotham wrote for the Court, "In an unbroken line dating to Roe v. Wade, the Supreme Court's abortion cases have established (and affirmed, and re-affirmed) a woman's right to choose an abortion before viability. States may regulate abortion procedures prior to viability so long as they do not impose an undue burden on the woman's right, but they may not ban abortions." A request for an en banc rehearing was denied.

In May 2019, the District Court for the Southern District of Mississippi issued another injunction, this time against a newly passed Mississippi abortion law. This was a heartbeat bill that forbade most abortions when a fetus's heartbeat could be detected, which is usually from six to 12 weeks into pregnancy. In a February 2020 per curiam decision, the Fifth Circuit also upheld the second injunction. The Fifth Circuit's statements for both injunctions were similar because they both cited the lack of fetal viability during earlier stages of gestation as a reason to enjoin the laws.

== Supreme Court ==
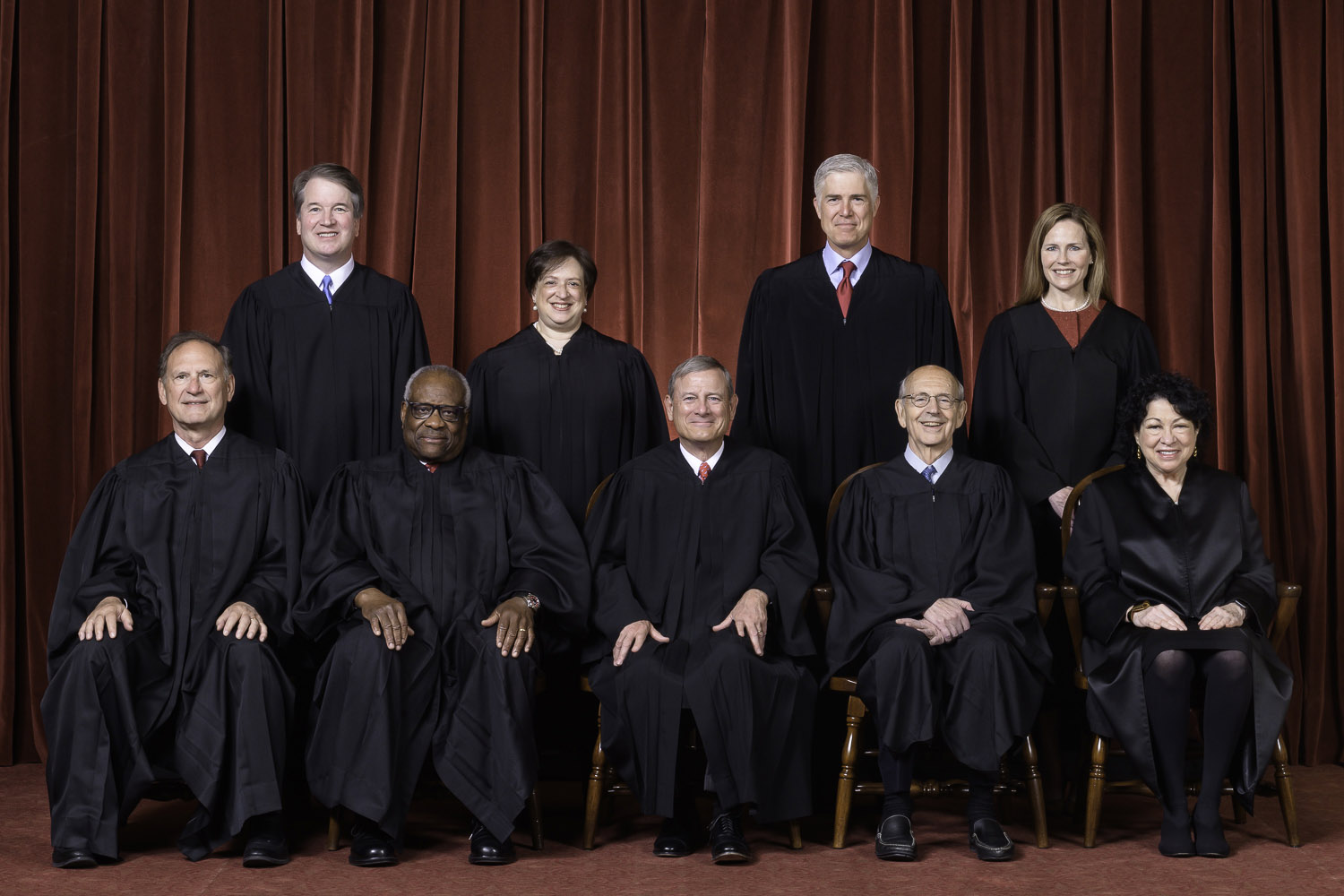
The Roberts Court at the time of the Dobbs decision

Mississippi petitioned its appeal of the Fifth Circuit decisions to the Supreme Court in June 2020. Its petition, filed by Mississippi Attorney General Lynn Fitch, focused on three questions from the appeals process. In its petition, Mississippi asked the Court to revisit the viability standard on the basis of the standard's inflexibility, and inadequate accommodation of present understandings of life before birth. The filing stated that fetuses can detect pain and respond to it at 10–12 weeks gestational age, and asked the Court to allow the prohibition of "inhumane procedures". The petition also contended that the viability standard inadequately addresses the protection of potential human life. Mississippi considered this a State interest from the "onset of the pregnancy" onward.

A response brief, which focused on two questions asked in opposition to the petition, was filed by Hillary Schneller from the Center for Reproductive Rights on behalf of Jackson Women's Health Organization (JWHO). JWHO asked the Court to deny Mississippi's petition due to judicial precedent. The brief said that both the District Court and the Fifth Circuit found the Mississippi law unconstitutional by properly applying precedent in a manner that did not conflict with other courts' decisions, and argued that there was therefore nothing about the case that "warrants this Court's intervention". The brief also argued that Mississippi was misinterpreting its role in abortion regulation. While the state thought that its interest was greater than the individual right to abortion, JWHO argued that Mississippi's vested interest in regulating abortion was insufficient to ban it before viability, making the Gestational Age Act "unconstitutional by any measure".

The petition went through review at more than a dozen conferences for the Court, which is unusual for most cases. The Court granted the petition for a writ of certiorari on May 17, 2021, limiting the Court's review to a single question, "Whether all pre-viability prohibitions on elective abortions are unconstitutional." Over 140 amici curiae briefs were submitted before oral argument in Dobbs, approaching the record set by Obergefell v. Hodges, in part to separate and concurrent lawsuits filed over the Texas Heartbeat Act, which effectively gave citizens of the state the means to enforce abortion bans through civil suits.

=== Oral argument ===
The case was heard on December 1, 2021. During the oral arguments, Mississippi was represented by Scott G. Stewart, the state's solicitor general, and argued that the U.S. Constitution does not directly guarantee a right to abortion. Because of this, he said that laws about abortion should be evaluated on a rational basis review instead of the higher level of scrutiny required by the undue burden standard. Stewart also argued for overturning Roe and Casey on the basis that the decisions were unworkable and that new facts had come to light since they were made. He argued that scientific knowledge had grown about "what we know the child is doing and looks like", and claimed that we now know that fetuses are "fully human" even "very early" in gestation. Stewart also defended Mississippi's claim in its briefs that new medical advances with viability were at odds with past assumptions made when formulating the viability line, and claimed that the understanding of when fetuses begin to feel pain had grown. He maintained that because of Roe and Casey, the government could not respond to these facts by prohibiting pre-viability abortions.

JWHO, represented by Julie Rikelman (who argued the last abortion case before the Court, June Medical Services, LLC v. Russo), argued that the Court should not overrule the two decisions, because the viability standard was correct. According to Rikelman, Mississippi's arguments against Roe were not new, but instead were similar to the ones Pennsylvania made during Casey. Given that Roe's essential holding was upheld for Casey, she said that the Court should do the same here, for there had been no new changes in the laws and facts since that time which could justify changing the Court's position. Rikelman argued that Mississippi's argument against using the undue burden standard was wrong because the standard actually specifically applies to post-viability abortion regulations rather than to the prohibition of abortions before viability. She told the Court that the undue burden standard was workable and that the viability line incorporated into the standard was likewise workable. She said that for 50 years the viability line had been clearly and consistently applied in the courts.

Elizabeth Prelogar, the U.S. Solicitor General, argued that Roe and Casey should not be overruled. She argued that there has been a substantial reliance on the right to abortion by both individuals and society, and that the Court "has never revoked a right that is so fundamental to so many Americans and so central to their ability to participate fully and equally in society."

Based on their analysis of the questioning, Court observers said that its six conservative members were likely to uphold Mississippi's law. Chief Justice John Roberts appeared to suggest that viability was not relevant to the holdings of either Roe or Casey, and that only a fair choice or opportunity to seek an abortion was constitutionally protected. The other conservative justices appeared to be ready to overturn Roe and Casey.

=== Leaked draft opinion ===
The leaked draft majority opinion

On May 2, 2022, Politico released a draft of a majority opinion by Justice Samuel Alito circulated among the justices in February 2022. Alito's draft called the Roe decision "egregiously wrong from the start", arguing that the Constitution does not "confer" a right to abortion, and instead allowed states to regulate or prohibit abortion under the "strong presumption of validity" applied to other health and welfare laws needing only to meet a rational basis standard to survive a constitutional challenge. A New York Times article compared the sources Alito cited in the draft with information provided by historians and shed some light on the history of abortion in the United States.

Sources told Politico that Justices Thomas, Gorsuch, Kavanaugh, and Barrett had voted in conference with Alito in December and their positions had remained unchanged as of May 2022, though it was unclear whether they agreed with Alito's draft, as no other drafts in concurrence or dissent had yet been circulated. According to CNN, Chief Justice Roberts voted to uphold the Gestational Age Act but "did not want to completely overturn Roe v. Wade". The Washington Post reported from court sources that Roberts had been working since December 2021 on his own opinion, which would uphold Roe while narrowly allowing the Mississippi law to take effect. He had been trying to convince conservative justices in the then tentative majority to join his more moderate opinion, but the leak doomed that effort, according to sources familiar with communications between the justices. In December 2023, The New York Times corroborated this, reporting that Roberts and Justice Stephen Breyer had been working on a compromise decision leaving Roe in place that would appeal to Kavanaugh when the leak disrupted their efforts.

The Supreme Court confirmed the draft's authenticity the next day; at the same time, the Supreme Court's press release said that "it does not represent a decision by the Court or the final position of any member on the issues in the case".

In response to the leak, Roberts said, "The work of the Court will not be affected in any way." At an Eleventh Circuit judicial conference, he called the leak "absolutely appalling" and said that "one bad apple" should not change "people's perception" of the Supreme Court; Thomas commented that the Court should not be "bullied" into delivering preferred outcomes and repeated his criticisms of stare decisis. He later added that the leak was an "unthinkable breach of trust" that "fundamentally" changed the Court.

Leaks about Supreme Court deliberations in a pending case are rare, and a leak of a draft decision has been called "unprecedented", but it has happened before, including in the case of Dred Scott v. Sandford. (Note: Supreme Court draft opinions are not considered classified information in the United States.) It has also been reported that knowledge of the decision in the 2011 case Burwell v. Hobby Lobby may have leaked weeks before its announcement.

==== Reactions ====
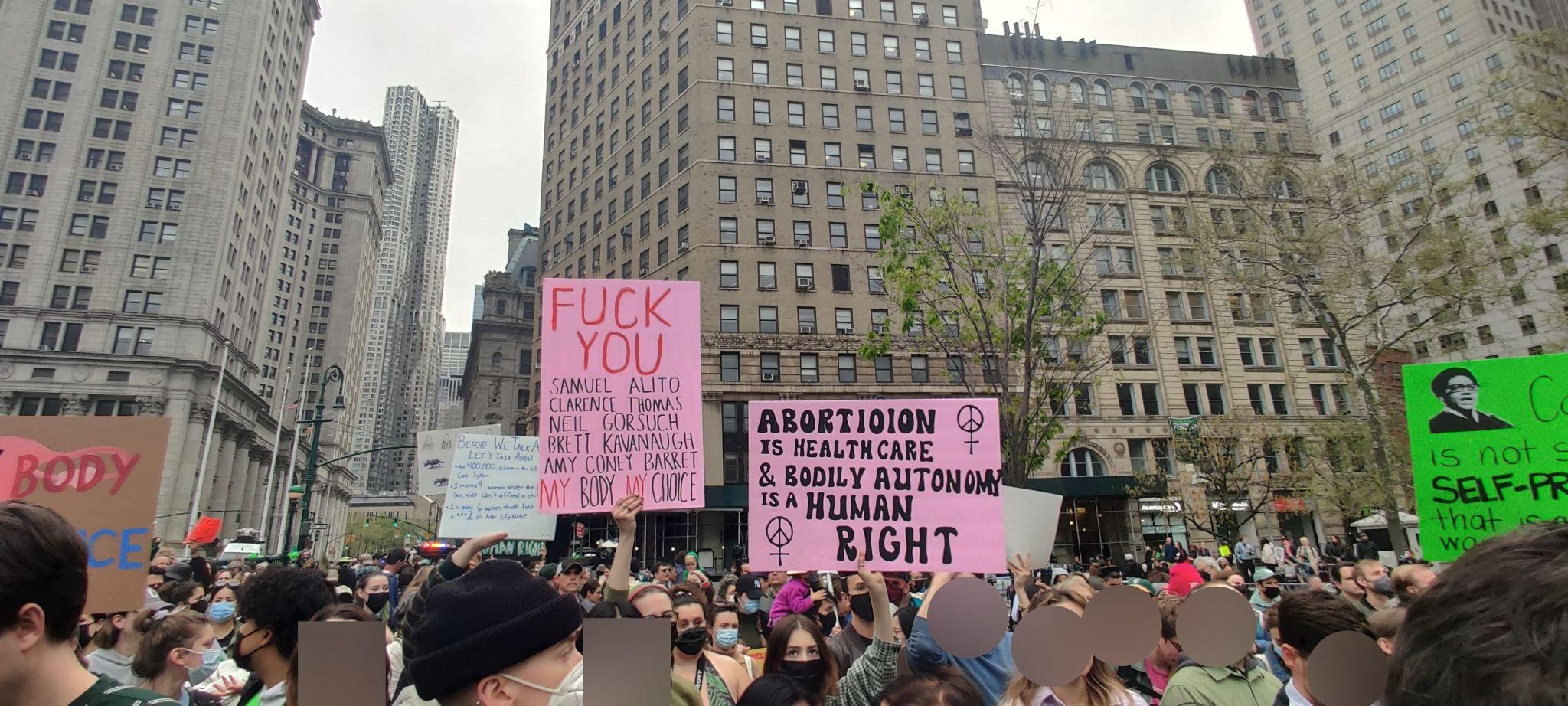
An abortion-rights protest (2022) in New York City

Within hours of the news of the leak, protesters from both sides gathered outside the Supreme Court building in Washington, D.C., and elsewhere in the U.S. The response to the draft put unusual public pressure on the Court as it made its decision in the case. While over 450 large-scale marches and protests organized by Planned Parenthood, Women's March, and other groups under the name "Bans Off Our Bodies" were planned for 2022, the organizers pushed the event up to May 14, 2022, after the opinion leaked. The organizers said, "Folks are mobilizing because they see that the hour is later than we thought", and that the event would lead off a "summer of rage" if Roe and Casey were overturned. A leaked Department of Homeland Security (DHS) memo indicated that DHS was preparing for a surge of political violence on public officials, clergy, and abortion providers after the ruling. A DHS bulletin warned that the leak had spawned further violence in the summer before the 2022 midterms. A number of isolated attacks on crisis pregnancy centers were reported in May and June 2022 after the leak.

Nonviolent protests were held outside some of the justices' homes, leading the U.S. Senate to unanimously pass a bill that would expand protections for the justices and their families. The bill stalled in the U.S. House of Representatives before being passed on June 14 and signed into law by President Joe Biden on June 16. Republicans have argued that those protests violate a 1950 federal law (18 U.S.C. § 1507) that criminalizes attempting to influence a judge in the course of their official duties by demonstrating near their residence. A man from California was arrested for attempted murder regarding an assassination plot targeting Kavanaugh near his home over the leak and a pending decision in a gun control case, New York State Rifle & Pistol Association, Inc. v. Bruen. Protests continued outside the homes of some of the justices after the final decision, leading the Supreme Court marshall Gail Curley to ask officials in the District of Columbia, Maryland, and Virginia to take steps to remove the protesters under state and local laws.

The leak elicited outrage from high-ranking members of both major political parties, Democrats for the content of the draft, and Republicans out of concern for how the leak occurred. The leak renewed calls from Democrats, including Biden and abortion rights activists, for the Senate to pass the Women's Health Protection Act, which had already passed the House of Representatives, to codify the rights established by Roe and Casey before Dobbs was decided and supersede the Religious Freedom Restoration Act. It failed to pass in the Senate on May 11, after a 49–51 vote primarily along party lines. Biden denounced the draft opinion as "radical" and said that same-sex marriage and birth control were also at risk.

Republicans immediately condemned the leak and called on the Supreme Court and Department of Justice, including the FBI, to launch an investigation. Twenty-two members of Congress signed a letter asking the U.S. Attorney General and FBI director to investigate. House Republican leadership issued a joint statement that called the leak "a clearly coordinated campaign to intimidate and obstruct the Justices".

In May 2022, the Marquette University Law School released a poll showing a drastic change of public opinion of the Supreme Court. In March 2022, when the survey was last conducted, 54% of respondents said they approved of the nine justices and 45% said they disapproved. In the newest survey, only 44% of respondents reported approval. In June 2022, a Gallup poll showed confidence in the Supreme Court at 25%, down from 36% in 2021, and the lowest in 50 years.

==== Investigation ====
Roberts directed the Marshal of the United States Supreme Court, Gail A. Curley, to investigate the leak. In May 2022, CNN reported that law clerks were asked to provide private cell phone records and sign affidavits, an unprecedented move that prompted some clerks to explore hiring personal counsel.

On January 19, 2023, the Supreme Court announced that Curley's investigation could not determine the person responsible by a preponderance of the evidence. The Court released a 20-page summary of its investigation. Michael Chertoff, a former judge and Cabinet secretary, reviewed the investigation report and said it was thorough. The investigative report and Chertoff's endorsement did not note that Chertoff's firm, The Chertoff Group, had been paid almost $1 million over the preceding five years to conduct security assessments for the Court; this was revealed later by the press and confirmed by Chertoff in a March 2023 letter to Congress.

Curley found that at least 91 people (82 staff members and the nine justices) had access to the draft decision, but none of the leads provided sufficient evidence to name an individual responsible for the leak. Investigators reviewed computer networks and printer logs and interviewed at least 97 Supreme Court personnel. Court staff were asked to provide sworn statements under risk of perjury. The initial report left unclear whether the justices had been interviewed, an omission that prompted an outpouring of questions and criticism. In response, a day after the report was issued, Curley said she had spoken "with each of the Justices, some on multiple occasions" but that neither the justices nor their spouses were interviewed under oath or asked to provide sworn affidavits.

Glenn Fine, a former inspector general of the Department of Justice and acting inspector general of the Department of Defense, criticized the conduct of the investigation. In a May 2023 article in The Atlantic, he wrote that the Marshal of the Supreme Court lacked the necessary independence to investigate, since she reports to the justices themselves and was thus "asked to investigate her bosses ... who are in the universe of potential leakers." Fine also wrote that the investigation created a double standard by intensively scrutinizing clerks and other employees but not questioning the justices to the same extent, and that the investigation's report failed to detail the facts found or address whether justices were involved in how the investigation proceeded. Fine also critiqued Chertoff's endorsement of the investigative report, writing that it disregarded "the report's weaknesses and the double standard in how the investigation was conducted" and that his contractual relationships with the Court may have produced "financial incentive to maintain good relations with it", leaving him "not in the best position to provide an unbiased opinion about the thoroughness of its internal investigation" and thereby creating "at the very least the appearance of" a conflict of interest.

The DoJ had initiated a criminal investigation of the leak by November 2026, overseen by Jeanine Pirro. This included grand jury subpoenas and interviews with those with knowledge of the Supreme Court processes.

=== Opinions ===
==== Majority opinion ====
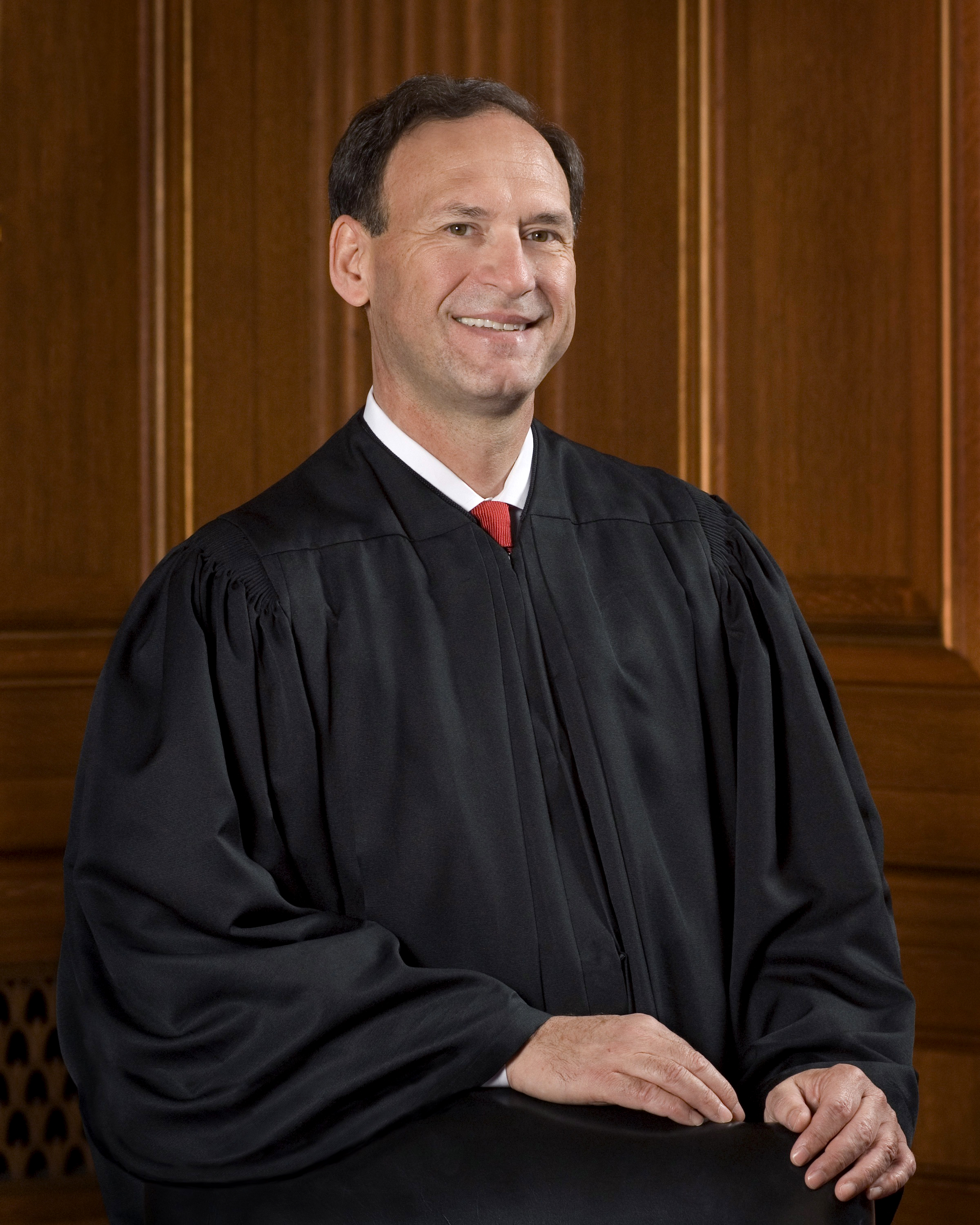
Justice Alito delivered the opinion of the Court.

The Court issued its decision on June 24, 2022. In a 6–3 judgment, the Court reversed the Fifth Circuit's decision and remanded the case for further review. The majority opinion, joined by five of the justices, held that abortion was not a protected right under the Constitution, overturning both Roe and Casey, and returned the decision regarding abortion regulations back to the states. As a result, Dobbs is considered a landmark decision of the Court.

The majority decision was written by Justice Samuel Alito and joined by Justices Clarence Thomas, Neil Gorsuch, Brett Kavanaugh, and Amy Coney Barrett. The final majority decision was substantially similar to the leaked draft, with only minor changes in the original arguments and rebuttals to Justices Stephen Breyer's, Elena Kagan's, and Sonia Sotomayor's joint dissenting opinion and John Roberts's concurrence in only the judgment.

In the introductory statement, Alito, writing for the majority, summarized a constitutional historical view of abortion rights, saying, "The Constitution makes no reference to abortion, and no such right is implicitly protected by any constitutional provision." Alito based his argument on the criterion from Washington v. Glucksberg (1997) that a right must be "deeply rooted" in the nation's history.

That provision [the Due Process Clause of the Fourteenth Amendment] has been held to guarantee some rights that are not mentioned in the Constitution, but any such right must be "deeply rooted in this Nation's history and tradition" and "implicit in the concept of ordered liberty."

— Dobbs, slip opinion p. 5 (Opinion of the Court)

Alito wrote, "abortion couldn't be constitutionally protected. Until the latter part of the 20th century, such a right was entirely unknown in American law. Indeed, when the Fourteenth Amendment was adopted, three quarters of the States made abortion a crime at all stages of pregnancy." He wrote, "Roe was egregiously wrong from the start. Its reasoning was exceptionally weak, and the decision has had damaging consequences. And far from bringing about a national settlement of the abortion issue, Roe and Casey have enflamed debate and deepened division."

After briefly describing the background of the case in Part I of the opinion, Alito argued in Part II that the right to an abortion was different from other privacy rights. He wrote, "What sharply distinguishes the abortion right from the rights recognized in the cases on which Roe and Casey rely is something that both those decisions acknowledged: Abortion destroys what those decisions call 'potential life' and what the law at issue in this case regards as the life of an 'unborn human being'." In addition to the language from the draft, Alito responded to the dissenting opinion, writing, "The dissent is very candid that it cannot show that a constitutional right to abortion has any foundation, let alone a 'deeply rooted' one, 'in this Nation's history and tradition'. The dissent does not identify any pre-Roe authority that supports such a right—no state constitutional provision or statute, no federal or state judicial precedent, not even a scholarly treatise."

In Part III, Alito discussed stare decisis. He also addressed the dissent's concern that Dobbs would extend to other rights, stating that the extent of the majority opinion on Dobbs applied only to abortion. In Part IV, Alito wrote that justices "cannot allow our decisions to be affected by any extraneous influences such as concern about the public's reaction to our work."

In Part V, Alito further responded to Roberts's concurrence in judgment seeking middle ground, claiming there are "serious problems with this approach" that would only "prolong" the "turmoil" of Roe. Alito argued that by only ruling that Mississippi's 15-week law is constitutional, the Court would have to later decide whether other states' laws with different deadlines for obtaining an abortion were constitutional. Alito and the majority rejected any constitutional grounds for upholding a "reasonable opportunity" to obtain an abortion and called Roberts's proposal unconstitutional. In Part VI, Alito wrote that because abortion is not a fundamental right, the lowest standard of review must apply to abortion laws, under which the laws must be sustained if they rationally relate to a legitimate state interest.

==== Concurrences ====
Thomas and Kavanaugh wrote separate concurrences. Thomas argued that the Court should go further in future cases, reconsidering other past Supreme Court cases that granted rights based on substantive due process, such as Griswold v. Connecticut (the right to contraception), Obergefell v. Hodges (the right to same-sex marriage), and Lawrence v. Texas (banned laws against private sexual acts). He wrote, "Because any substantive due process decision is 'demonstrably erroneous,' we have a duty to 'correct the error' established in those precedents."

Kavanaugh wrote separately, making multiple comments. He stated that it would still be unconstitutional to prohibit a woman from going to another state to seek an abortion under the right to travel, and that it would be unconstitutional to retroactively punish abortions performed before Dobbs when they had been protected by Roe and Casey.

==== Concurrence in judgment ====
Roberts concurred in the judgment only. He believed the Court should reverse the Fifth Circuit's opinion on the Mississippi law and that "the viability line established by Roe and Casey should be discarded." Roberts did not agree with the majority's ruling to overturn Roe and Casey in their entirety, finding it "unnecessary to decide the case before us" and writing that overruling "Roe and Casey is a serious jolt to the legal system". He suggested a narrower opinion to justify the constitutionality of Mississippi's law without addressing whether to overturn Roe and Casey. Roberts also wrote that abortion regulations should "extend far enough to ensure a reasonable opportunity to choose, but need not extend any further." Under his approach, he wrote, the Court would "be free to exercise our discretion in deciding whether and when to take up" further abortion cases, "from a more informed perspective." Roberts closed by concluding that he is "not sure...that a ban on terminating a pregnancy from the moment of conception must be treated the same under the Constitution as a ban after fifteen weeks" and that "the Court's opinion and the dissent display a relentless freedom from doubt on the legal issue that I cannot share".

==== Dissent ====
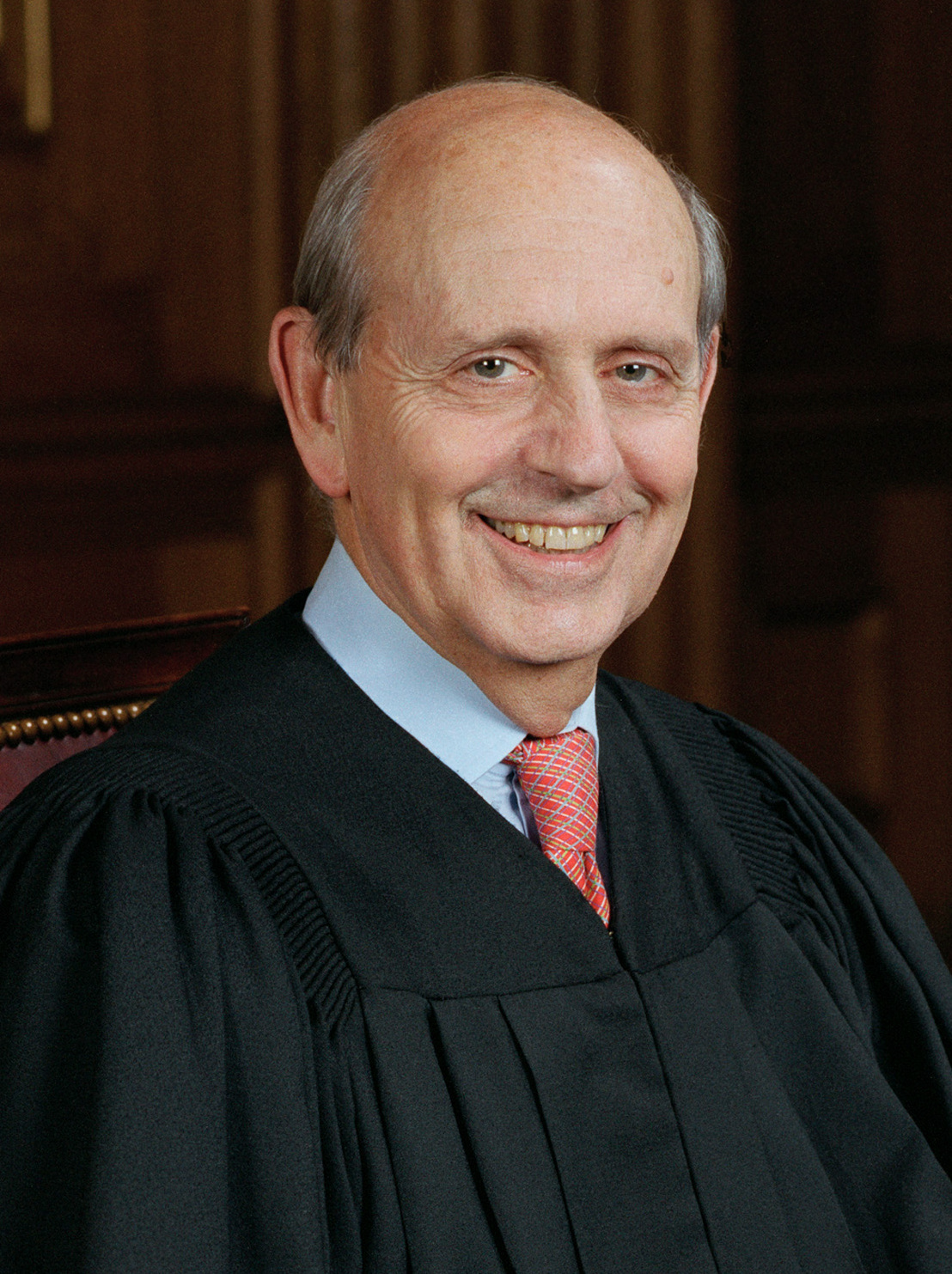
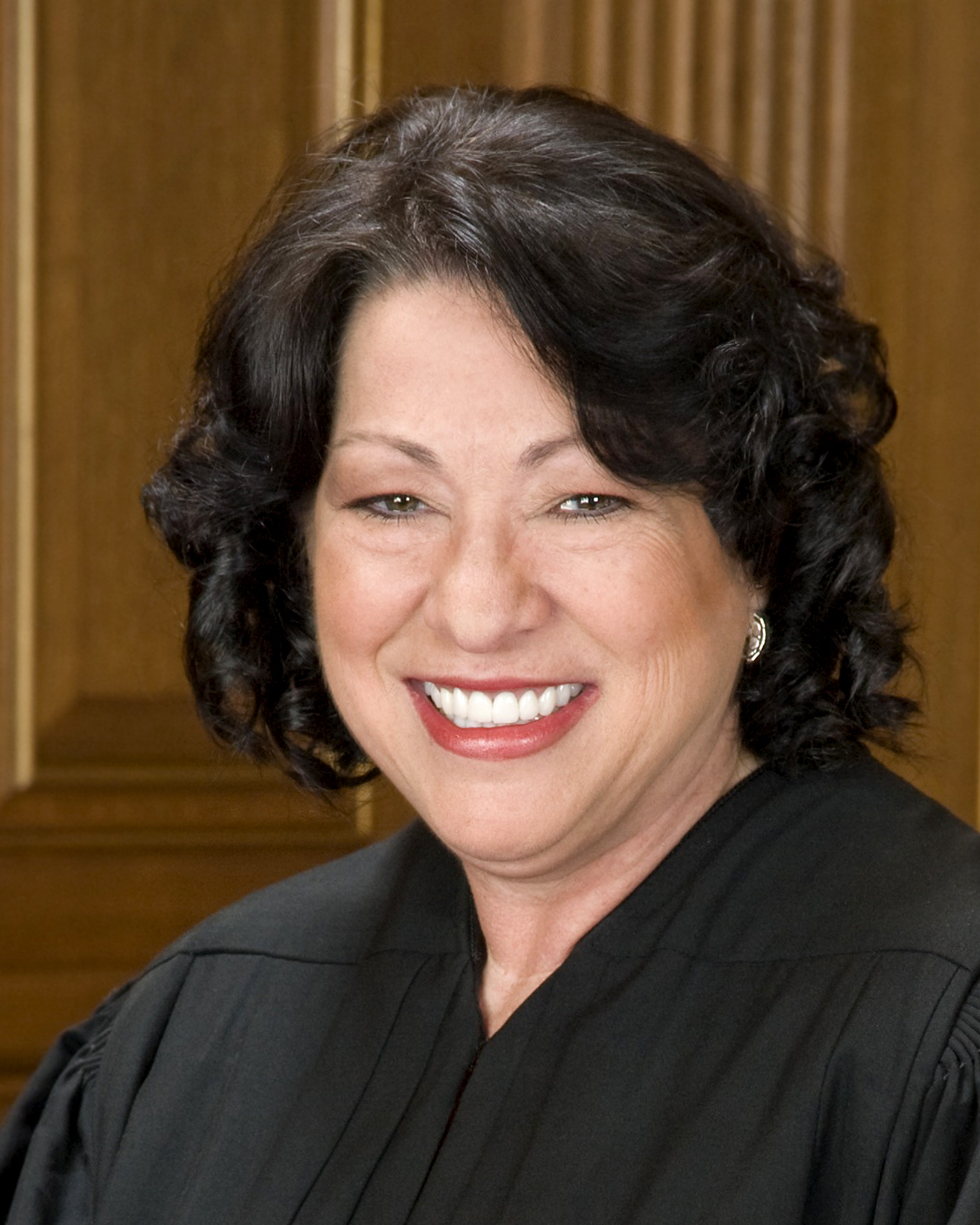
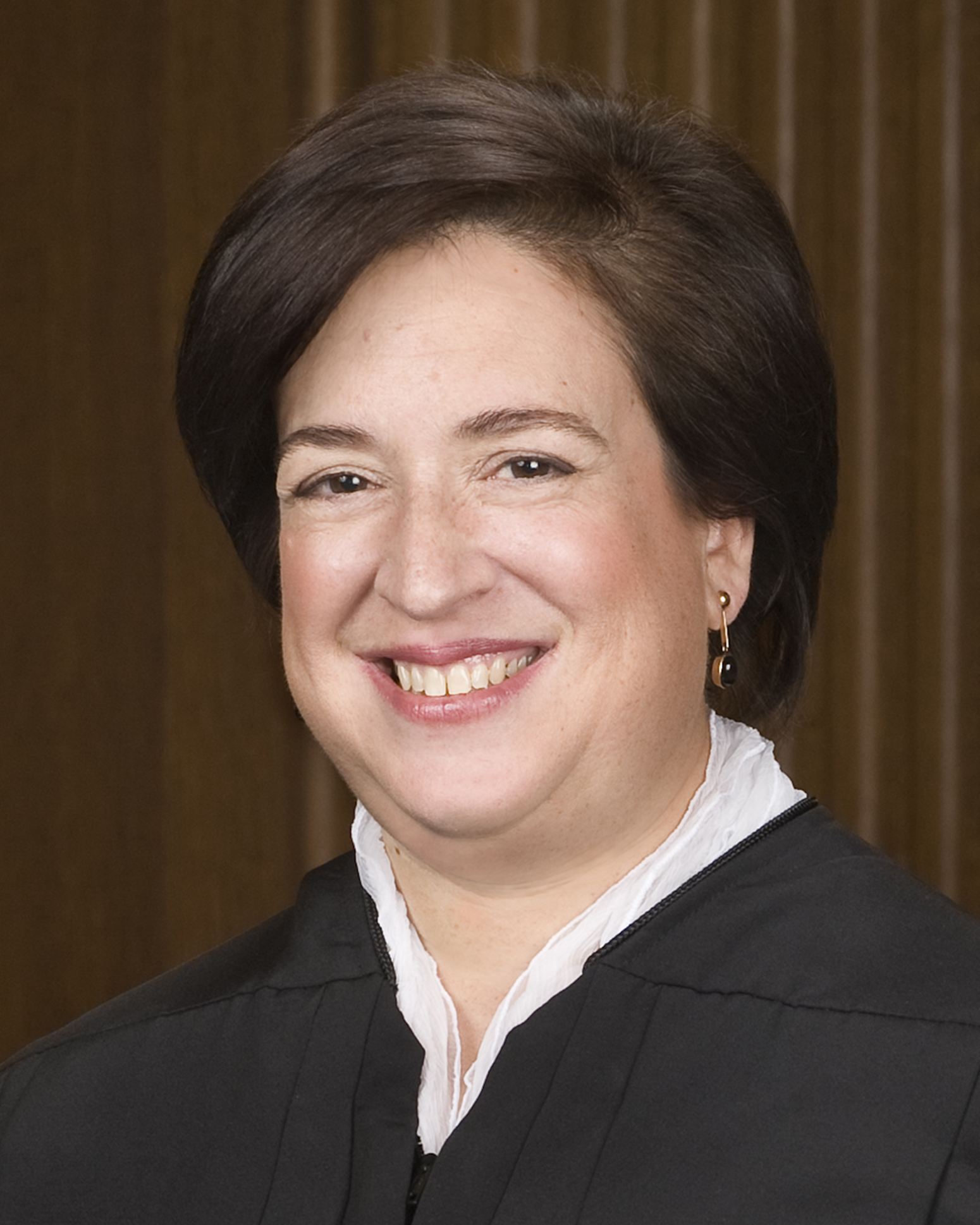
Justices Stephen Breyer, Sonia Sotomayor, and Elena Kagan wrote a joint dissent criticizing the majority for overturning Roe and Casey.

Breyer, Sotomayor, and Kagan jointly wrote the dissent. In an introductory statement, they wrote, "The right Roe and Casey recognized does not stand alone. To the contrary, the Court has linked it for decades to other settled freedoms involving bodily integrity, familial relationships, and procreation. Most obviously, the right to terminate a pregnancy arose straight out of the right to purchase and use contraception. In turn, those rights led, more recently, to rights of same-sex intimacy and marriage. Either the mass of the majority's opinion is hypocrisy, or additional constitutional rights are under threat. It is one or the other."

In Part I of their dissent, the three wrote, "The majority would allow States to ban abortion from conception onward because it does not think forced childbirth at all implicates a woman's rights to equality and freedom. Today's Court, that is, does not think there is anything of constitutional significance attached to a woman's control of her body and the path of her life. A State can force her to bring a pregnancy to term, even at the steepest personal and familial costs." They cited New York State Rifle & Pistol Association, Inc. v. Bruen ("Historical evidence that long predates [ratification] may not illuminate the scope of the right"), and wrote, "Had the pre-Roe liberalization of abortion laws occurred more quickly and more widely in the 20th century, the majority would say (once again) that only the ratifiers' views are germane." Addressing the majority's argument, based on Glucksberg, that a right must be "deeply rooted in the Nation's history", the dissenters reflected on what that approach would have meant for interracial marriage:

The Fourteenth Amendment's ratifiers did not think it gave black and white people a right to marry each other. To the contrary, contemporaneous practice deemed that act quite as unprotected as abortion. Yet the Court in Loving v. Virginia, 388 U. S. 1 (1967), read the Fourteenth Amendment to embrace the Lovings' union.

— Dobbs, slip opinion p. 17 (Breyer, Sotomayor, and Kagan, JJ., dissenting)

In response to Alito's claim that their "criteria, at a high level of generality, could license fundamental rights to illicit drug use, prostitution, and the like", they wrote, "that is flat wrong. The Court's precedents about bodily autonomy, sexual and familial relations, and procreation are all interwoven—all part of the fabric of our constitutional law, and because that is so, of our lives. Especially women's lives, where they safeguard a right to self-determination." In response to Kavanaugh's concurrence, they wrote, "His idea is that neutrality lies in giving the abortion issue to the States, where some can go one way and some another. But would he say that the Court is being 'scrupulously neutral' if it allowed New York and California to ban all the guns they want?" In Part II, the three discussed stare decisis. In Part III, they concluded, "With sorrow—for this Court, but more, for the many millions of American women who have today lost a fundamental constitutional protection—we dissent."

== Impact ==
=== Pre-decision ===
After the Dobbs litigation began, the Texas Heartbeat Act was enacted on September 1, 2021. Two lawsuits challenging the law, Whole Woman's Health v. Jackson and United States v. Texas, quickly propagated through the court systems and reached the Supreme Court. Oral arguments for both cases were on November 1, 2021, and decisions for both were issued in December 2021. The decisions primarily focused on standing rather than directly addressing constitutional matters and abortion-related issues; both allowed the Texas Heartbeat Act to remain in force while litigation continued in lower courts. Concern about the Supreme Court's considering three abortion-related cases in the 2021–22 term led to the near record number of amici curiae briefs filed for Dobbs before the case was argued on December 1, 2021.

U.S. states that have trigger laws that restricted abortions after Roe was overturned

Georgia had passed Georgia House Bill 481, best known as the Living Infants Fairness Equality (LIFE) Act, in 2019. The law banned most abortions after a fetal heartbeat was detected, about six weeks' time, with multiple exceptions: if the fetus were conceived by rape or incest, if the pregnancy were medically futile, or if the pregnancy threatened the mother's life. The law also revised who is considered a legal person, allowing pregnant women to receive child support and tax deductions for their offspring before birth. In October 2019, the LIFE Act was challenged, and in July 2020 the U.S. District Court for the Northern District of Georgia deemed it unconstitutional under Roe. Georgia appealed this ruling to the Eleventh Circuit, but because Dobbs was scheduled to be argued in December 2021, the Circuit Court issued a stay of review until after the Supreme Court decided Dobbs.

At least 22 states with Republican leadership either passed or were in the process of passing anti-abortion related bills when the Supreme Court agreed to hear Dobbs in May 2021. Enforcement of most of the new laws was enjoined by courts, but they became enforceable after Roe was overturned. Thirteen states have trigger laws that ban most abortions in the first and second trimesters if Roe is overturned. The states with trigger laws are Arkansas, Idaho, Kentucky, Louisiana, Mississippi, Missouri, North Dakota, Oklahoma, South Dakota, Tennessee, Texas, Utah, and Wyoming. Nine states, among them Alabama (which also passed the Human Life Protection Act in 2019), Arizona, Arkansas, Michigan, Mississippi, Oklahoma, Texas, West Virginia, and Wisconsin, never repealed their pre-Roe abortion bans, such as the Texas abortion statutes (1961). Those laws were not criminally enforceable due to Roe but are enforceable with Roe overturned. At least some Democratic attorneys general or candidates for attorneys general have pledged not to enforce anti-abortion laws and prevent or hinder local prosecutors' efforts to enforce them, whereas at least some Republicans have pledged to enforce new state bans.

=== Post-decision ===
Status of elective abortion in the United States Illegal, limited exceptions (Note: All states and territories, apart from the Northern Mariana Islands, allow abortion to prevent the woman's imminent death (with various definitions of "imminent"), and some for other reasons. Northern Mariana Islands allows exceptions per law, but no law has been passed. • Additional allowance for risk to the woman's physical health: Alabama, Arizona, Florida, Georgia, Indiana, Iowa, Kansas, Kentucky, Louisiana, Missouri, Montana, Nebraska, New Hampshire, North Carolina, North Dakota, Ohio, Pennsylvania, South Carolina, Tennessee, Utah, West Virginia, Wisconsin, and Wyoming. • Allowance for risk to the woman's general health: California, Connecticut, Delaware, Hawaii, Indiana, Illinois, Maine, Maryland, Massachusetts, Michigan, Minnesota, Nevada, New York, Rhode Island, Virginia, Washington. • Allowance for pregnancy due to rape or incest: Georgia, Idaho, Indiana, Iowa, Mississippi, North Dakota, South Carolina, West Virginia, Utah, and Wyoming. • Allowance for lethal fetal abnormality: Alabama, Delaware, Florida, Georgia, Indiana, Iowa, Louisiana, Maryland, Massachusetts, South Carolina, West Virginia, Wyoming, and Utah. Note that these allowances may have a time limit, which may be as early as cardiac-cell activity (approximately 6 weeks LMP); others may have no limit. Different allowances may have different limits in the same state.) Legal, but no providers Legal before cardiac-cell activity (Note: Cardiac-cell activity is generally detectable in the 6th week LMP. Allowance beyond this limit is made, at minimum, for an immediate threat to the woman's life. In general, states that permit limited elective abortion may allow abortion beyond that limit for some or all of the reasons listed above.) Legal through 12th week LMP* Legal through 18th week LMP* Legal through 22nd week LMP* (5 months) Legal before fetal viability (Note: Typically, fetal viability begins in the 23rd or 24th week LMP.) Legal through 24th week LMP* (5½ months) Legal through second trimester (Note: The second trimester is variously defined as through 27th or 28th week LMP.) Legal at any stage *LMP is the time elapsed since the last menstruation began. This color-coded map illustrates the current legal status of elective-specific abortion procedures in each of the individual states, U.S. territories, and federal district. State supreme courts and other high courts may mandate that abortions either are able or are not able to be performed, even if law allows or does not allow it. A colored border indicates a more stringent restriction or ban that is blocked by legal injunction.

==== State laws restricting abortion ====
The overturning of Roe did not make abortion illegal nationwide. Abortion remains legal in most states, but those with trigger laws to restrict abortion with Roe and Casey overturned immediately did so. Multiple Republican governors and attorneys general moved to invoke their trigger laws to immediately ban abortion or call special sessions to implement abortion bans. In August 2022, Indiana became the first state to pass an abortion ban law after Dobbs.

Some states had older laws that restricted abortion but had been put on hold after Roe; after Dobbs, these states reviewed means to resume enforcement of the laws. Lawsuits challenging pre-Roe and newer laws were filed in multiple states; each argued that privacy provisions in the state's constitution provided abortion rights. In some states where such challenges were under way, injunctions against the laws restricting abortion were issued, including Louisiana and Utah on June 27, 2022. A lower state court placed an injunction on a 1928 pre-Roe ban in Texas on June 28; by July 1, the Texas Supreme Court reversed this order. Legal efforts to block a Wisconsin pre-Roe ban from being enforced were announced on June 28; by June 30, Michigan's state supreme court had yet to react to Governor Gretchen Whitmer's lawsuit alleging that the state's pre-Roe ban violated the state constitution. Abortion providers in Kentucky, Idaho, Mississippi, and Florida challenged newly passed abortion restrictions in those states; each suit alleged that the law violated provisions of the state's constitution. By June 30, judges had halted the enforcement of the laws in Kentucky and Florida.

An Ohio abortion law came under attention in July 2022. The law disallows abortions after embryonic cardiac activity is detectable (approximately six weeks into term), and makes no exceptions for rape or incest. The law passed in 2019 and had been blocked from enforcement by a court injunction, but with Dobbs, the injunction was lifted. A ten-year-old girl who had been raped traveled from Ohio to Indiana to have an abortion, as reported by the Indianapolis Star on July 1; her rapist was arrested by July 13. Before this arrest was made public, right-leaning politicians and media sources called the story a hoax; Ohio Attorney General Dave Yost said, "Every day that goes by, the more likely that this is a fabrication." After news of the arrest validated the Star's story, these sources did not apologize for claiming the story was a hoax. Jim Bopp, the general counsel for the National Right to Life Committee, said in an interview that the girl should have been forced to bear the child, and that "She would have had the baby, and as many women who have had babies as a result of rape, we would hope that she would understand the reason and ultimately the benefit of having the child." Bopp's comment led to ire from several left-leaning politicians and media sources, deriding Dobbs and the stance taken by the right.

By April 2023, abortion access had become "largely illegal" in much of the United States, with Republican-controlled states predominantly passing near-total abortion bans. Republican politicians have also predominantly advocated or taken measures toward a national ban on mifepristone, enforcement of the 1870s Comstock laws, and restrictions on interstate travel for abortion.

According to the Kaiser Family Foundation, as of April 12, 2023, 15 states have de jure early-stage bans on abortion without exceptions for rape or incest: Alabama, Arizona, Arkansas, Florida, Kentucky, Louisiana, Mississippi, Missouri, Ohio, Oklahoma, South Dakota, Tennessee, Texas, West Virginia and Wisconsin. In states with early abortion restrictions that grant de jure exceptions, it was reported that "very few exceptions to these new abortion bans have been granted" and that patients who had been raped or otherwise qualified were being turned away, citing "ambiguous laws and the threat of criminal penalties make them unwilling to test the rules".

==== EMTALA and federal preemption ====
Several states adopted, or began to enforce, laws that banned abortion without exceptions. But the U.S. Department of Health and Human Services (HHS) issued guidance after Dobbs stating that even in these states, abortions are still allowed if a physician determines that the pregnant woman's life is at risk, under the Emergency Medical Treatment and Active Labor Act (EMTALA), which requires hospitals receiving Medicare funding to provide emergency stabilizing medical treatment. As a federal law, EMTALA preempts inconsistent state law. The HHS guidance said: "If a physician believes that a pregnant patient presenting at an emergency department is experiencing an emergency medical condition as defined by EMTALA, and that abortion is the stabilizing treatment necessary to resolve that condition, the physician must provide that treatment. When a state law prohibits abortion and does not include an exception for the life of the pregnant person—or draws the exception more narrowly than EMTALA's emergency medical condition definition—that state law is preempted."

The U.S. Department of Justice sued Idaho, arguing that EMTALA preempts Idaho's law making it a criminal offense to perform any abortion, without exception. A district judge granted a preliminary injunction blocking Idaho's abortion ban "to the extent that [the ban] conflicts with EMTALA-mandated care." A three-judge panel of the Ninth Circuit, all appointed by Republican presidents, ordered that Idaho's ban be enforced while they prepared to hear the case, but an en banc panel reversed that order. The state appealed to the Supreme Court, which reordered that the state ban be enforced and heard oral arguments in April 2024 as Moyle v. United States.

Conversely, Texas responded to the HHS guidance by suing the Biden administration. In August 2022, a district judge in the Eastern District of Texas blocked HHS from applying the guidance. The White House criticized the ruling, and the Justice Department is appealing the ruling to the Fifth Circuit. In January 2024, the Fifth Circuit ruled in Texas's favor, holding that the HHS overstepped its authority in requiring abortion to be used in medical emergencies; this ruling came a few days before the Supreme Court accepted the Idaho case.

After Dobbs, the Department of Veterans Affairs continued its policy of offering abortion counseling to military veterans (as well as abortions to pregnant military veterans if the veteran's life is in danger and in cases of rape or incest), even in states where abortion is banned as a matter of state law. Beneficiaries of the VA's Civilian Health and Medical Program (CHAMPVA) are also entitled to the same services.

==== State laws expanding abortion access ====
In response to Dobbs, several states allowing abortion considered or adopted legislation expanding abortion access. Proposals by California, Oregon, and Washington state have included expanding abortion access by eliminating co-pays for abortion services, funding travel costs for those seeking abortion from states that ban abortion, and adding the right to an abortion to state constitutions. In early 2022, while Dobbs was pending, the Vermont Legislature had already approved sending Proposal 5 to the referendum ballot in November 2022, which would amend the state's constitution "to guarantee sexual and reproductive freedoms" (including the right to abortion). In the November 2022 election, Vermont voters overwhelmingly approved the reproductive-rights amendment to the state constitution. Also in the November 2022 election, abortion-rights referendums were passed by voters by broad margins in California (Proposition 1) and Michigan (Proposal 3).

In the hours after Dobbs was issued, Massachusetts Governor Charlie Baker issued an executive order with several measures to protect abortion access in Massachusetts. The Massachusetts Legislature subsequently passed a reproductive rights package that codified many of the provisions in the executive order, and was the outcome of compromise discussions among the legislature. Baker signed the bill, which passed the House 137–16 and the Senate 16–1. Among other things, the Massachusetts law strengthens an existing requirement that health insurers cover abortion services and shields Massachusetts patients and providers from penalties from states with more restrictive abortion laws; for example, it prohibits the state from extraditing to another state any person charged with offenses that would be legal under Massachusetts law, and protects abortion providers from lawsuits based on extraterritorial jurisdiction.

==== Congressional proposals ====
Since Dobbs, Congress has introduced bills related to abortion. House Democrats passed two bills on July 15 to enhance abortion access. The first, the Women's Health Protection Act of 2022, would prevent states from restricting abortions and burdening abortion providers. The second, the Ensuring Access to Abortion Act of 2022, would prevent states from blocking travel to other states to obtain abortions and support. Both bills passed primarily on party lines, and were expected to have difficulty passing the Senate. Some House Republicans had proposed a nationwide 15-week abortion ban, while over 100 had signed onto a proposal for a six-week abortion ban. Top House Republicans had been reported to be wary of such plans, instead favoring a nationwide ban on late-term abortions only.

Due to concerns based on Thomas's concurrence, in July 2022 the House passed bills aimed to protect rights that Thomas had mentioned, including the right to same-sex and interracial marriages via the Respect for Marriage Act, and access to contraceptives. The Senate passed the Respect for Marriage Act with amendments for exempting religious-based organizations, which the House passed in December and Biden signed into law on December 13, 2022.

==== Executive action by President Biden ====
After the decision, President Biden said there was a need to protect abortion rights, but said he would not support an executive order to mandate them though he did ultimately endorse reforming the Senate's filibuster to allow Democrats to pass federal abortion protections. On July 8, 2022, Biden issued Executive Order 14076, "Executive Order on Protecting Access to Reproductive Healthcare Services", which instructed the Department of Health and Human Services (HHS) to review and find ways to assure access to "the full range of reproductive health services", including "emergency contraception and long-acting reversible contraception like intrauterine devices (IUDs)", within the birth control coverage of the Affordable Care Act. The executive order also instructed HHS to evaluate ways to provide "technical assistance to states affording legal protection to out-of-state patients as well as providers who offer legal reproductive health care".

On August 3, 2022, Biden issued another executive order aimed at protecting women seeking abortions in other states.

==== Medical abortion, in vitro fertilization, and other processes ====
The Court's decision also sparked concern over access to medication abortion options, including the prescription of mifepristone and misoprostol. These medications have been approved for use by the United States Food and Drug Administration (FDA) within the first ten weeks of pregnancy. Secretary of Health and Human Services Xavier Becerra asserted that after the Dobbs decision, "We stand unwavering in our commitment to ensure every American has access to health care and the ability to make decisions about health care—including the right to safe and legal abortion, such as medication abortion that has been approved by the FDA for over 20 years." In April 2023, in Alliance for Hippocratic Medicine v. US Food and Drug Administration in the Northern District of Texas, Judge Matthew J. Kacsmaryk ruled that the government's approval of mifepristone in 2000 was invalid, banning the use of the drug across the United States. On appeal of the ruling to the Supreme Court, the Court ruled to stay the order, leaving mifepristone available on the market, while the Fifth Circuit heard the appeal.

Despite the federal stance, states opposed to abortion were considering laws to ban access to medical abortion, including out-of-state shipments in the U.S. mail and telemedicine support. Some states seeking to block medical abortion options are also considering censoring information about this option to residents, leading to potential First Amendment legal battles. Whether such state bans are legal under the Supremacy Clause is yet to be determined.

States that support abortion rights expected an influx of requests for abortion. Doctors and prescribers saw increased demand for contraception after both the leak and the ruling, including emergency and long-lasting after the latter. Some national pharmacy chains imposed limits on purchases. Other Americans have been denied refills of medical prescriptions for methotrexate, a form of chemotherapy taken long term for many autoimmune diseases, as it can sometimes function as an abortifacient.

Several states with pro-abortion stances also passed shield laws to protect doctors who prescribed medical abortion drugs by mail from out-of-state lawsuits targeting this practice. In December 2024, Texas Attorney General Ken Paxton sued a New York doctor who prescribed abortion pills to a Texan woman by mail. Paxton's suit asserts the doctor's action violates Texas' abortion laws, but New York is a state with shield laws. The lawsuit is anticipated to challenge the validity of shield laws in light of Dobbs.

Doctors throughout the U.S. reported an increase in requests for vasectomies. A Florida doctor said requests have doubled since the ruling with a prominent and continuous increase since June 24. Many of the men said they had previously considered a vasectomy but the ruling had been the tipping point.

Dobbs has been implicated in creating new legal issues for in-vitro fertilization. In February 2024, the Alabama Supreme Court ruled in LePage v. Center for Reproductive Medicine that frozen embryos are considered "minor children" for purposes of the state's 1872 Wrongful Death of a Minor law, reaffirming a conclusion the court had first reached in 2011. Several Alabama IVF clinics, fearing they would be held liable for accidental loss of embryos, suspended operations. The ruling created a de facto ban on IVF in Alabama until a new law granting protections to IVF procedures passed a month later. According to Politico, more cases are likely in the future, with "the Catholic Church and a growing number of evangelicals... [believing] all IVF is wrong because it separates conception from the sexual act between husband and wife".

==== Data privacy ====
Data privacy concerns were raised related to data tracking through Internet usage, mobile phone usage, and mobile applications. States with strict abortion laws could use this information to determine if women were seeking to have abortions. In addition to users taking steps to minimize their data footprint, groups like the Electronic Frontier Foundation urged companies that make these apps to take steps to reduce the amount of data they collect and use end-to-end encryption to further aid those seeking abortions outside of states that have banned them. House Speaker Nancy Pelosi said Democrats will introduce a bill to set certain requirements for reproductive health apps such as Flo. She said the legislation would aim to prevent data these apps collect from identifying women seeking abortions. Google announced it would delete location history data after users visit "medical facilities", including abortion clinics, counseling centers, and domestic violence shelters. The company also stated that it would introduce a way to mass-delete period data for Fitbit users.

==== 2022 and 2024 United States election seasons ====
Dobbs made abortion rights a major issue in the November 2022 United States elections. Democrats, who generally support abortion rights, used the issue to try to offset the 2021–2022 inflation surge and Biden's lower approval rating when Dobbs was announced. Republicans, who were seeking to retake seats in both the House and Senate and gain several state governor and legislature positions in tight races, had some concern that the negative reaction to Dobbs could work against them. They hoped that by November there would be more focus on the economy and other issues on which they expect to win. According to analyst firm AdImpact, by September 2022, Democrats had spent $34 million on political advertising that highlighted abortion rights, while Republicans had spent only $1.1 million on abortion-related ads, instead focusing on other issues.

At least six states had an abortion-related ballot initiative in response to Dobbs, the most ever in a single year. The first test came with Kansas's referendum on August 2, 2022. The state's Value Them Both constitutional amendment was approved for public vote about a year before Dobbs was decided. It would have removed Kansas's constitutional protections for abortion, allowing the legislature to enact more restrictions on the procedure. In the wake of Dobbs, voter registration in Kansas surged, particularly among Democratic and female voters. Almost 60% of voters voted against the amendment.

The backlash to the decision resulted in a boost in polling and performance for Democrats in special congressional races. According to election analysis site FiveThirtyEight, by August 2022 the impact of Dobbs led to an unusual swing in favor of Democrats ahead of the general election by nine points. The results of the midterm elections showed a significant impact of Dobbs, with voters supporting abortion rights helping Democrats retain control of the Senate as well as to support state-level changes to support abortion rights in five states.

The debate over abortion rights remained a significant issue leading into the 2024 United States elections. Dobbs helped to increase support for abortion rights, with an estimated 25% increase in voters leaning in support a year after the decision. Republicans found a significant backlash from moderates for their hard push for abortion bans at the state level, and party leaders expressed desire to moderate views on abortion ahead of the elections. Several key 2023 elections were won by Democratic candidates, and Ohio Issue 1, a resolution to codify abortion rights in the state constitution, passed. Resolutions supporting abortion rights passed in seven more states in 2024.

==== Effects on abortion rates ====
Since Dobbs was decided, data collected by a research group shows a general increase in abortion rates up to June 2023. States that banned abortions after the sixth week of pregnancy experienced a decrease, while states that allow abortion saw an increase.

==== Effects on infant mortality ====
Studies using Texas data before and after the passage of the Heartbeat Act, and early statistics nationwide, showed that the stricter abortion bans passed by states were leading to a higher rate of infant mortality, about an 8% increase in the national average after Dobbs. Researchers attributed this to a combination of more births with potential complications being taken to term due to the lack of abortion options, and women's inability to get proper care to prevent mortality after birth.

== Reaction ==
=== Legal journalists ===
Alito's final opinion mirrored points made in the leaked draft, evaluating abortion from a historical standpoint and arguing that the Fourteenth Amendment covers only those rights that were "deeply rooted" at the time of its ratification in 1868, which did not include abortion. He referenced common law, including 17th-century English law, which outlawed abortion after quickening, the point when fetal movements are detectable (16 to 22 weeks of gestation), and the 12th-century Leges Henrici Primi.

Alito pointed to a wave of laws introduced in the U.S. in the 19th century that outlawed pre-quickening abortions, and wrote, "abortion couldn't be constitutionally protected. Until the latter part of the 20th century, such a right was entirely unknown in American law. When the Fourteenth Amendment was adopted, three quarters of the States made abortion a crime at all stages of pregnancy." Some historians say that Alito's view skews the history of abortion in the U.S. and creates a flawed basis for overturning Roe.

David H. Gans of The Atlantic criticized conservative originalists' "history and tradition" analysis, in which constitutionality is based on state legislative practices at the time the Fourteenth Amendment was ratified. Adam Liptak of The New York Times noted the dissenters' response to Alito's emphasis on Brown v. Board of Education as an example of the Court properly overturning its own "egregiously wrong" precedent: "If the Brown court had used the majority's method of constitutional construction it might not even have overruled Plessy, whether five or 50 or 100 years later." Liptak wrote that opponents of school desegregation had argued that segregated schools were legal under most state laws at the time the Fourteenth Amendment was ratified, and that the majority opinion in Brown had conceded the historical evidence was at best "inconclusive". In Politico, Leslie Reagan criticized the assertion that abortion was not "deeply rooted" in American "history and tradition".

Nancy Gertner and John Reinstein commented that, in earlier centuries, American society was deeply sexist and excluded women from politics, banning contraception to ensure "that women performed their duties as wives and mothers".

The decision raised concerns about similar rights the Court recognizes that are not enumerated in the Constitution according to originalism. According to Thomas's concurrence, the rights to contraceptives and to same-sex marriage could be challenged based on Dobbs, since they were not recognized during the 19th century either. Some legal experts cautioned that Alito's and Thomas's interpretation of the Constitution could harm women, minorities, and other marginalized groups. University of Colorado Boulder Associate Professor of Law Scott Skinner-Thompson said, "The Court has for a long, long time said: Look, if we define liberty only in terms of what was permitted at the time of ratification of the Bill of Rights or the Fourteenth Amendment, then we're stuck in time. Because in the 18th and 19th centuries, this country was not very free for many, many people—particularly women, particularly people of color." Further, Roe itself was built on the legal reasoning of the two cases that assured contraceptive availability, Griswold v. Connecticut and Eisenstadt v. Baird, which held that the Fourteenth Amendment establishes a "zone of personal privacy and autonomy" with which the states cannot interfere, according to Emily Berman, an associate professor at the University of Houston. Berman said that the way Alito had rationalized overturning Roe could lead to challenges to both Griswold and Eisenstadt based on the apparent lack of explicit Fourteenth Amendment coverage. Alabama used the Dobbs rationale of deeply rooted rights to argue for lifting a federal injunction placed in May 2022 on its law that would ban gender-affirming care for minors that was to go into effect in 2023.

Lawyer Helen Alvaré praised the decision as a win for democracy, human life, and women. She criticized the dissenting justices and other opponents of the decision for failing to engage with majority's historical analysis, employing an unwarranted charge of sexism, and being anti-democratic.

=== Political ===
==== Support ====
Those aligned with the United States anti-abortion movement celebrated Dobbs, including the National Right to Life Committee, other anti-abortion activists, Republican Senate Minority Leader Mitch McConnell, and many other congressional Republicans. After former president Barack Obama criticized the Court for overruling the longstanding precedent of Roe v. Wade, Senator John Cornyn tweeted, "Now do Plessy vs Ferguson/Brown vs Board of Education", alluding to the fact that the latter Supreme Court decision had largely overruled the former, a then-58-year-old precedent that racial segregation was constitutional.

In a statement, former president Donald Trump took credit for the decision and called it "the biggest WIN for LIFE in a generation". But in private, Trump was reportedly more ambivalent about overturning Roe, speculating that it might be "bad for Republicans" by leading to backlash among suburban women voters in the upcoming midterm elections. In the aftermath of the contest, he publicly blamed "anti-abortion extremism" for Republican candidates' underperformance. Former vice president Mike Pence applauded the decision, saying that "life won", and called for a national ban on abortion.

Republican Florida Governor Ron DeSantis said, "By properly interpreting the Constitution, the Supreme Court has answered the prayers of millions upon millions of Americans," adding that he would work to further restrict abortion in Florida. Republican Florida Senate President Wilton Simpson, who was adopted as a child, argued the Court's decision would promote adoption as an alternative to abortion. Simpson said, "Florida is a state that values life."

==== Opposition ====
President Biden addresses the nation on the decision.

Conversely, those aligned with the United States abortion-rights movement opposed the decision, including President Joe Biden, who said, "It's a sad day for the Court and for the country ... the health and life of women in this nation are now at risk"; former president Barack Obama, who called it an "attack" on "the essential freedoms of millions of Americans"; U.S. Attorney General Merrick Garland, who warned states not to forbid women to seek abortions beyond their borders; U.S. Secretary of Health and Human Services Xavier Becerra, who called the decision "unconscionable" and said that abortion is an essential part of healthcare; Senator Elizabeth Warren, who called for increasing the number of justices on the court; and many other congressional Democrats.

Senator Susan Collins, a Republican who supports abortion rights and voted in the Senate to confirm Kavanaugh, said she felt "misled" by Kavanaugh, who, she claimed, said in a private meeting with her that he would respect precedent, assuring her that he is "a don't-rock-the-boat kind of judge". Democratic Senator Joe Manchin, who crossed party lines and voted to confirm both Kavanaugh and Gorsuch, made similar comments, saying, "I trusted Justice Gorsuch and Justice Kavanaugh when they testified under oath that they also believed Roe v. Wade was settled legal precedent and I am alarmed they chose to reject the stability the ruling has provided for two generations of Americans." Massachusetts Governor Charlie Baker, a Republican, expressed disappointment in the decision and signed an executive order protecting abortion rights in the state. Governors Jay Inslee, Kate Brown, and Gavin Newsom of Washington, Oregon, and California, respectively, announced a formation of the "West Coast offense", a joint policy to allow and protect abortion rights.

Representative Alexandria Ocasio-Cortez called Dobbs and other recent decisions she deemed favorable to conservatives a "judicial coup", demanding that President Joe Biden and Congress act to curtail the Supreme Court's power.

=== Religious ===
The decision was seen as a victory for the Christian right in American politics. The president of the anti-abortion group Operation Rescue, Troy Newman, called the decision a "human rights victory". Support was widespread among leaders of the Catholic Church, including Pope Francis, who compared abortion to "hiring a hit man"; the United States Conference of Catholic Bishops; Archbishops José Horacio Gómez and William E. Lori; and many other bishops. President Bart Barber and other officials of the Southern Baptist Convention, and the Life Ministry of the Lutheran Church—Missouri Synod, celebrated the decision.

Mainline Protestant leaders were generally critical of the decision, including Bishop Elizabeth Eaton of the Evangelical Lutheran Church in America, the General Ministers of United Church of Christ, and Presiding Bishop Michael Curry of the Episcopal Church.

Many American Jewish organizations, including the National Council of Jewish Women, Hadassah, American Jewish Committee, the Anti-Defamation League, Hillel International, the Rabbinical Assembly, and the Women's Rabbinic Network, opposed the decision. They cited support for legal abortion and religious freedom, disagreeing with the court's opinion and "conservative Christian theology" on the beginning of human personhood. By contrast, the Haredi Orthodox Jewish organization Agudath Israel of America, "welcome[d]" the end of Roe v. Wade.

American Muslims' reactions were varied, as views on abortion differ within Islam. Many said Dobbs curtailed religious freedom, reflected only Christian right views, and damaged cultural and religious pluralism.

=== Civil rights ===
Multiple civil and reproductive rights groups, including the NAACP, criticized the decision. The Congressional Black Caucus called for the declaration of a national emergency. Liberals argued that the ruling and Thomas's concurrence created the potential to jeopardize other civil rights. Laurence H. Tribe, a constitutional scholar and a professor at Harvard Law School, called it not only "reactionary" and "unprincipled" but also damaging to the Ninth Amendment to the United States Constitution. Linda Coffee, a leading attorney for Norma McCorvey in Roe v. Wade, said the Supreme Court's decision to overturn it "flies in the face of American freedom" and "destroys dignity of all American women". Jim Obergefell, the lead plaintiff in the Supreme Court case Obergefell v. Hodges that ruled same-sex marriage bans unconstitutional, criticized Thomas, whose own interracial marriage required Loving v. Virginia in order to be recognized by all states, for urging the Court to revisit and overrule its prior decisions.

=== Health and education ===
The president and CEO of the Association of American Medical Colleges, David J. Skorton, released a statement that said the decision "will significantly limit access for so many and increase health inequities across the country, ultimately putting women's lives at risk, at the very time that we should be redoubling our commitment to patient-centered, evidence-based care that promotes better health for all individuals and communities." The statement further affirmed the association's commitment to providing abortion access, saying that it "will continue working with our medical schools and teaching hospitals to ensure that physicians are able to provide all patients with safe, effective, and accessible health care when they need it." The president of the American Academy of Pediatrics, Moria Szilagyi, released a statement that the organization reaffirmed the policy to support "adolescents' right to access comprehensive, evidence-based reproductive healthcare services", including abortion. She added that the decision threatened adolescents' health and safety and jeopardized the patient-physician relationship.

Academics from the University of Minnesota School of Public Health and the University of Colorado Boulder criticized the decision, saying that as there is going to be an increase in pregnancies, there will be an increase in maternal and infant deaths. In 2020, there were 23.8 deaths from pregnancy or childbirth-related causes for every 100,000 births, the highest maternal mortality rate of any developed country, with black mothers 2.9 times more likely to die than white mothers.

A study published in JAMA Internal Medicine found that demand for abortion medications in the United States, as reflected by internet search trends, reached record highs nationally after the draft Dobbs opinion was leaked online. Public health activists have begun exploring ways to make medical abortion more available, particularly in states where it is subject to limitations, using social media for this purpose.

=== International ===
Abortion laws around the world

The United Nations High Commissioner for Human Rights, Michelle Bachelet, said that the decision "represents a major setback after five decades of protection for sexual and reproductive health and rights". The Director-General of the World Health Organization, Tedros Adhanom Ghebreyesus, said, "I am very disappointed, because women's rights must be protected. And I would have expected America to protect such rights."

Chinese government officials, who normally maintain neutrality about other countries' domestic affairs, also criticized the decision as an attack on human rights. The Chinese Deputy Consul General in Auckland went as far as calling on European nations to sanction the U.S. The Chinese Consul General in Cape Town connected the decision to gun rights, posting an image that suggested that gun rights and abortion limits are destroying American freedom.

Western world foreign leaders generally condemned the decision. Canadian Prime Minister Justin Trudeau called the decision "horrific", while pledging, "[I]n Canada, we will always defend the woman's right to choose." British Prime Minister Boris Johnson called the decision "a big step backwards", while reassuring that there were laws "throughout the UK" for a "woman's right to choose". Scottish First Minister Nicola Sturgeon tweeted after the ruling that this was "[o]ne of the darkest days for women's rights" in her lifetime. Belgian Prime Minister Alexander De Croo said that he was "very concerned about implications of U.S. Supreme Court decision" and "the signal it sends to the world". French President Emmanuel Macron said that "abortion is a fundamental right for all women. It must be protected." He expressed his "solidarity" with U.S. women. Danish Prime Minister Mette Frederiksen called the decision "a huge setback" and said that her "heart cries for girls and women in the United States". New Zealand Prime Minister Jacinda Ardern called the decision "incredibly upsetting" and "a loss for women everywhere". Greek Prime Minister Kyriakos Mitsotakis said he was "really troubled" by the decision, saying it is "a major step back in the fight for women's rights". Spanish Prime Minister Pedro Sánchez said that "we cannot take any right for granted" and that "women must be able to decide freely about their lives".

Alito responded to the international criticism in a keynote address largely about religious liberty to Notre Dame Law School's Religious Liberty Initiative in Rome. He mocked several foreign leaders for criticizing the decision, particularly UK Prime Minister Boris Johnson, whose pending resignation Alito referenced; and Prince Harry, Duke of Sussex, who had compared the decision to the 2022 Russian invasion of Ukraine.

Brazilian president Jair Bolsonaro indirectly signaled his approval, tweeting, "May God continue to give strength and wisdom to those who protect the innocence and future of our children, in Brazil and around the world" the day the decision was released, one day after he had criticized abortion. The President of the Vatican's Pontifical Academy for Life, Archbishop Vincenzo Paglia, called the ruling "a powerful invitation to reflect together on the serious and urgent issue of human generativity and the conditions that make it possible". Members of some European far-right parties, notably Beatrix von Storch of Alternative for Germany, approved of the decision.

The reversal of Roe raised concern in several European nations, and the European Parliament urged its member states to protect abortion rights. In July 2022, the European Parliament voted 324–155, with 38 abstentions, to condemn the ruling. Within weeks of the Dobbs ruling, the French legislature began the process of introducing a bill to amend its constitution to protect abortion as a right. The process was completed on March 5, 2024, making France the first country to recognize a constitutional right to abortion since the former Yugoslavia.

=== News organizations ===
The editorial boards of many news outlets opposed the ruling, including The New York Times, The Washington Post, Los Angeles Times, Chicago Tribune, The Boston Globe, Newsday, Houston Chronicle, Miami Herald, Detroit Free Press, Star Tribune, and The Denver Post. The ruling was supported by the senior editorial staff of National Review, and the editorial boards of The Wall Street Journal, The Washington Times, and the New York Post. Readership of women-centric news publications increased during the aftermath of the ruling.

=== Public ===
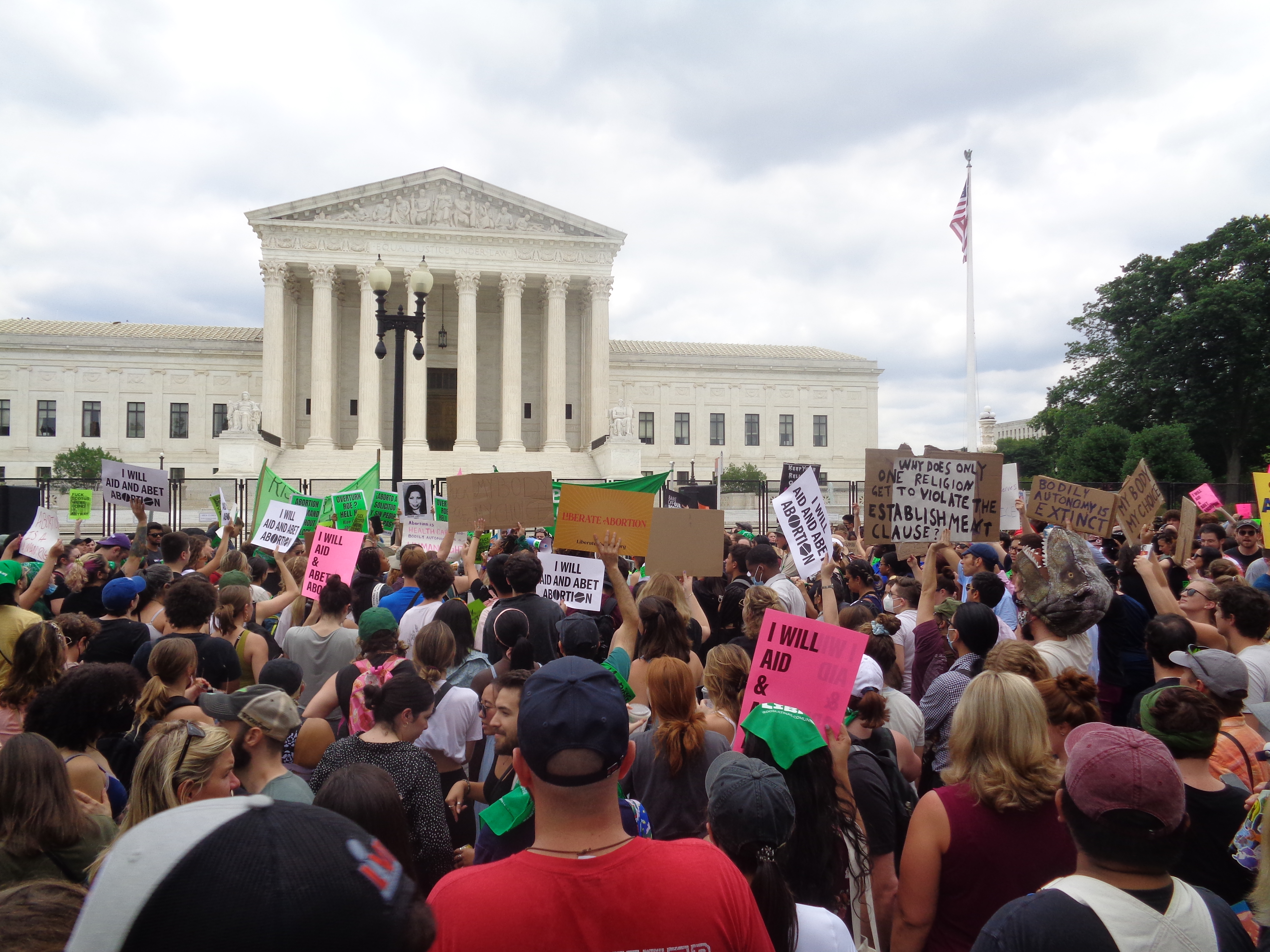
Protesters outside of the Supreme Court after the announcement of Dobbs

The decision was divisive among the American public. Around 55–60% of respondents expressed disapproval when asked if they believed Roe should be overturned. But polls conducted before the ruling also showed that only around 29% of Americans believe abortion should generally be legal until fetal viability (24 weeks), the threshold set by Planned Parenthood v. Casey. A June 2022 Harvard/Harris poll found that 44% of Americans believe that state legislatures should set abortion standards, while 25% believe the Supreme Court should, and 31% believe Congress should; a June 2022 CBS/YouGov poll found that 58% of Americans support federal legislation to protect abortion rights nationwide. A May 2022 Gallup poll showed that 67% of Americans support legal abortion in the first trimester of pregnancy, 36% support legal abortion in the second trimester, and 20% support legal abortion in the third trimester. Public support for abortion rights increased after the decision; an August 2022 Wall Street Journal poll found that 60% of Americans supported access to abortion to in most or all circumstances, up from 55% in a poll conducted in March. The same poll also found that bans after six or 15 weeks of pregnancy (with the exception of cases where the mothers' health was threatened) were unpopular, with 62% and 57% of Americans opposed, respectively.

Large numbers of protesters gathered at the Supreme Court building after the decision's announcement. Clashes between police and protesters, resulting in tear gassing and arrests, occurred in Los Angeles, New York City, and Phoenix. Protests also took place in Chicago, along with solidarity protests in Berlin, London, and Toronto, and were planned to take place throughout the U.S. over the days after the decision. The DHS issued a memo to law enforcement agencies and first responders to be aware of potential extremist violence in the weeks following the decision, particularly at federal and state government offices, abortion clinics and other health providers, and at faith-based organizations.

The decision sparked at least one incident of trespassing into a state legislature by abortion-rights activists. Protesters breached a security barrier at the Arizona State Capitol and attempted to enter the building while the legislature was in session. The proceedings were temporarily halted as lawmakers were forced into the building's basement after tear gas was fired into the crowd.

Some politicians and academics questioned the Supreme Court's legitimacy in the wake of the leak and official ruling in Dobbs. A June 2022 Harvard/Harris poll showed that 63% of Americans consider the Supreme Court legitimate and 59% believe it is wrong to call it illegitimate. NBC News had run polls on the public opinion of the Supreme Court since 1992, with majority opinion wavering between neutral and positive through May 2022. Its August 2022 poll, after Dobbs, had the majority with a negative opinion of the Court. Compared to only 17% of respondents with little to no confidence in the Court in June 2019, the number had increased to 37% by August 2022.

A 2023 Public Religion Research Institute poll found that a majority in every state opposed the overturn of Roe v. Wade.

=== Corporate and celebrity ===
Most corporations remained silent about the ruling, even ones that had been outspoken on social issues in the past. But some, including Amazon, Comcast, Dell, Disney, eBay, Goldman Sachs, JPMorgan Chase, Levi Strauss & Co., Meta, Netflix, Paramount, Snap, Sony, Tesla, and Yelp, said they would cover travel benefits for employees seeking abortions in states that protected abortion access.

Several technology executives and celebrities have condemned the ruling. The NBA and WNBA released a joint statement supporting the right to abortion. The National Women's Soccer League Players Association and Major League Soccer (MLS) also condemned the ruling.

Some celebrities have promised to donate or raise money for abortion funds. Singer-songwriter and actress Olivia Rodrigo announced Fund 4 Good, which will give a direct share of the proceeds from her Guts World Tour in North America to the National Network of Abortion Funds. The American rapper and singer Lizzo pledged to donate $500,000 to Planned Parenthood, which was then matched by Live Nation Entertainment.

== Legacy ==
=== Cultural and political effects ===
Dobbs led to profound social changes in American society surrounding abortion. Once considered a taboo subject in the U.S., even after Roe v. Wade, support for legal abortion access skyrocketed in the decision's aftermath. According to Greer Donley, an expert in abortion law and a professor at the University of Pittsburgh, abortion used to be a topic "talked about in the shadows ... Dobbs kind of blew that up".

According to pollster Celinda Lake, support for abortion access rose by 10 to 15 points in the year after the decision. Referendums conducted in the decision's wake in Kansas, Montana, California, Vermont, Michigan, Kentucky, and Ohio uniformly came out in favor of abortion rights, generally by margins that were both bipartisan and overwhelming. While many American politicians oppose legal abortion access, the anti-abortion movement has mostly made its advances through elite-driven support; among the electorate, the movement's positions are deeply unpopular. Polling has indicated that many Republican voters identify as pro-choice and support abortion access; they generally care more about the economy, taxes, and illegal immigration than prohibiting abortion.

States that restricted abortion access became global outliers on reproductive rights. Internationally, the widespread trend since 1973 has been toward loosening restrictions—as of 2023, it is now broadly legal throughout the vast majority of the developed world, with the exception of Poland—with moves to restriction only recently passing in authoritarian polities or countries that are undergoing democratic backsliding or collapse. Abortion is presently broadly restricted in 17 states, the vast majority in the South.

=== Medical and sociological effects ===
Early academic studies and a survey of obstetricians and gynecologists since the Dobbs decision predicted national rises in maternal deaths, inequality, and poverty. Perhaps paradoxically, national abortion incidence increased in the decision's aftermath. Some scholars correctly interpreted Justice Thomas's concurrence in Dobbs to predict the impact Dobbs would have on in vitro fertilization (IVF). In February 2024, the Alabama Supreme Court ruled that cryopreserved embryos are "persons" or "extrauterine children".

== See also ==
- List of United States Supreme Court leaks
