= Thomas E. Dobbs =

State Health Officer of Mississippi

State Health Officer of Mississippi
- In office 1 November 2018 – 31 July 2022; Acting: 1 November 2018 – 13 December 2018
- Governor: Phil Bryant; Tate Reeves
- Deputy: Daniel Edney
- Preceded by: Mary Currier
- Succeeded by: Daniel Edney

Deputy State Health Officer of Mississippi
- In office July 2018 – December 2018

Personal details
- Education: Emory University (BS); University of Alabama (MPH) (MD)
- Occupation: Physician; Academic; Civil Servant

Thomas E. Dobbs III is an American physician currently serving as dean of the John D. Bower School of Population Health at the University of Mississippi Medical Center.

Dobbs previously served as State Health Officer of Mississippi, where he became widely known as the namesake of the Dobbs v. Jackson Women's Health Organization landmark decision of the U.S. Supreme Court in which the court held, in June 2022, that the Constitution of the United States does not confer a right to abortion. Dobbs himself had no involvement in the case.

== Career ==
Dobbs graduated with a Bachelor of Science in Applied physics from Emory University. He earned his medical degree in 1996, followed by a Master of Public Health in 2000, and completed residencies in Internal Medicine in 1999 and Infectious Diseases in 2005, all at the University of Alabama. He thereafter worked in various positions in the Mississippi State Department of Health, including as Regional Health Officer from 2008 to 2012, as State Epidemiologist from 2012 to 2016, and briefly as Deputy State Health Officer in 2018 before succeeding State Health Officer Mary Currier, who retired after 9 years of service. Dobbs resigned in July 2022 to return to academia.
