= Abortion in Mississippi =

Abortion in Mississippi is illegal. The new law took effect on July 7, 2022, after Mississippi State Attorney General Lynn Fitch certified on June 27, the Supreme Court decision on Dobbs v. Jackson Women's Health Organization on June 24 of that year. State Attorney General Lynn Fitch's certification made Mississippi's 2007 'trigger law' go into effect and ban all abortions in the state, “except in the case where necessary for the preservation of the mother's life or where the pregnancy was caused by rape".

The number of abortion clinics declined in the years prior to their outlawing, falling from thirteen in 1982 to eight in 1992. By 2006, only one remained. The final clinic closed on July 6, 2022, following the overruling of Roe v. Wade. There were 2,303 legal abortions in 2014, and 2,613 in 2015. Most women went out of state to get a legal abortion.

== Context ==
Free birth control correlates to teenage girls having fewer pregnancies and fewer abortions. A 2014 New England Journal of Medicine study found such a link. At the same time, a 2011 study by Center for Reproductive Rights and Ibis Reproductive Health also found that states with more abortion restrictions have higher rates of maternal death, higher rates of uninsured pregnant women, higher rates of infant and child deaths, higher rates of teen drug and alcohol abuse, and lower rates of cancer screening. It is unlikely that abortion restrictions are the direct cause of these factors, however. The negative effects are more likely to be linked to access to healthcare, the number of healthcare facilities, and socioeconomic status. The study singled out Oklahoma, Mississippi, and Kansas as being the most restrictive states that year, followed by Arkansas and Indiana for second in terms of abortion restrictions, and Florida, Arizona, and Alabama in third for most restrictive state abortion requirements.

According to a 2017 report from the Center for Reproductive Rights and Ibis Reproductive Health, states that tried to pass additional constraints on a woman's ability to access legal abortions had fewer policies supporting women's health, maternal health, and children's health. These states also tended to resist expanding Medicaid, family leave, medical leave, and sex education in public schools. In 2017, Georgia, Ohio, Missouri, Louisiana, Alabama, and Mississippi have among the highest rates of infant mortality in the United States. Mississippi had an infant mortality rate of 8.6 deaths per 1,000 live births.

Medicaid expansion under the Affordable Care Act was rejected by Alabama, Georgia, Mississippi, and Missouri. Consequently, poor women in the typical age range to become mothers had a gap in coverage for prenatal care. According to Georgetown University Center for Children and Families research professor Adam Searing, "The uninsured rate for women of childbearing age is nearly twice as high in states that have not expanded Medicaid. ... That means a lot more women who don't have health coverage before they get pregnant or after they have their children. ... If states would expand Medicaid coverage, they would improve the health of mothers and babies and save lives." According to the 2018 Premature Birth Report Cards, Louisiana, Mississippi, and Alabama were all given an F. In the 2018 America's Health Rankings produced by United Health Foundation, Mississippi ranked 32nd in the country when it came to maternal mortality. A 2018 March of Dimes report stated that the preterm birth rate among African American women in Mississippi was significantly higher, 44% higher than women of all other races in the state.

In the year following the overturn of Roe v. Wade in 2022, 210 pregnant women in a dozen states were criminally charged for conduct associated with their pregnancy, pregnancy loss or birth. Six states — Alabama, Mississippi, Ohio, Oklahoma, South Carolina and Texas — accounted for most cases.

In August 2023, a 13-year-old girl in Mississippi made national news when she gave birth after being raped the previous fall; she was denied an abortion under Mississippi's near-total abortion ban. Her mother stated that no one informed her of the state's rape exception.

In 2025, the Mississippi State Department of Health declared a public emergency in response to a sharp increase in infant mortality across the state, increasing to the highest rate in over a decade. Mississippi has the highest infant mortality rate in the United States. This was partially attributed to Mississippi's total abortion ban, resulting in a higher number of infant deaths due to fatal fetal abnormalities, congenital malformations and genetic and chromosomal disorders.

== History ==
=== Legislative history ===
By the end of the 1800s, all states in the Union except Louisiana had therapeutic exceptions in their legislative bans on abortions. In the 19th century, bans by state legislatures on abortion were about protecting the life of the mother given the number of deaths caused by abortions; state governments saw themselves as looking out for the lives of their citizens.

In 1966, the Mississippi legislature made abortion legal in cases of rape. By the end of 1972, Mississippi allowed abortion in cases of rape or incest only and Alabama and Massachusetts allowed abortions only in cases where the woman's physical health was endangered. In order to obtain abortions during this period, women would often travel from a state where abortion was illegal to states where it was legal. Mississippi passed a parental consent law in the early 1990s. This law impacted when minors sought abortions, resulting in an increase of 19% for abortions sought after 12 weeks.

On February 27, 2006, Mississippi's House Public Health Committee voted to approve a ban on abortion, but that bill died after the House and Senate failed to agree on compromise legislation. The state was one of 23 states in 2007 to have a detailed abortion-specific informed consent requirement. Mississippi, Nebraska, North Dakota, and Ohio all had statutes in 2007 that required specific informed consent on abortion but also, by statute, allowing medical doctors performing abortions to disassociate themselves from the anti-abortion materials they were required to provide to their female patients. By law, abortion providers in Alabama, Louisiana, and Mississippi were required to perform ultrasounds before providing women with abortions, even in situations such as in the first trimester where ultrasound has no medical necessity. Some states, such as Alaska, Mississippi, West Virginia, Texas, and Kansas, have passed laws requiring abortion providers to warn patients of a link between abortion and breast cancer and to issue other scientifically unsupported warnings. On November 8, 2011, the Personhood amendment, to define personhood as beginning "at the moment of fertilization, cloning, or the functional equivalent thereof," was rejected by 57 percent of voters.

In 2013, the state Targeted Regulation of Abortion Providers (TRAP) law applied to medication-induced abortions and private doctor offices in addition to abortion clinics. The state legislature was one of five states nationwide that tried and failed, to pass a "fetal heartbeat bill" in 2013. Only North Dakota successfully passed such a law but it was later struck down by the courts. The terminology of these bills is largely contested and considered to be inaccurate by medical professionals. This is because at the proposed time, (as early as 6 weeks) the conceptus is not yet considered a fetus, and is actually an embryo. Additionally, there is no heart present in the embryo; it would more accurately be called a cluster of cells with electrical activity. In 2013, Mississippi was one of five states where the legislature introduced a bill that would have banned abortion in almost all cases. It did not pass. They tried and failed again in 2015, 2017 and 2018, where they were one of five, one of six, and one in eleven respectively. The state legislature was one of four states nationwide that tried, and failed, to pass a "fetal heartbeat bill" in 2012. In 2012, the Mississippi State Legislature passed a law that required abortion clinics to have doctors on staff with hospital admitting privileges. This almost led to the closure of the state's only abortion clinic.

Mississippi legislature was one of eight states nationwide that tried, again, and failed, to pass a "fetal heartbeat" bill in 2017.

In March 2018, the Mississippi House passed House Bill 1510, the Gestational Age Act, that outlawed abortion after 15 weeks "except in a medical emergency or in the case of a severe fetal abnormality". A difference between the Gestational Age Act and federal level bills that attempted to pass a Pain-Capable Unborn Child Protection Act was that the Gestational Age Act does not allow exemptions in cases of rape or incest. The state had a law on the books as of August 2018 that would be triggered if Roe v. Wade was overturned.

"Heartbeat bills" in Mississippi died in committee in 2013, 2014, 2017, 2018, and 2019.

Three more "heartbeat bills" were filed in the Mississippi Legislature in January 2019. SB 2116, by Sen. Angela Burks Hill was referred to the Public Health and Welfare Committee on January 11, 2019. HB 732, by Rep. Chris Brown was referred to the Public Health and Human Services Committee on January 17, 2019. After passing out of their respective committees on February 5, 2019, both SB 2116 and HB 732, were passed out of the Mississippi Senate and Mississippi House on February 13, 2019. On March 19, 2019, the Senate concurred in the House amendments to SB 2116, and on March 22, 2019, the fetal heartbeat bill was signed into law by Mississippi Governor Phil Bryant.

In 2020, a law was enacted in Mississippi banning abortions based on the sex, race, or genetic abnormality of the fetus.

A law outlawing abortion in Mississippi took effect on July 7, 2022, after Mississippi State Attorney General Lynn Fitch on June 27 of that year certified the June 24, 2022, Supreme Court decision on Dobbs v. Jackson Women's Health Organization.

=== Ballot box history ===
In the 2011 election season, Mississippi placed an amendment on the ballot that redefines how the state viewed abortion. The personhood amendment defined personhood as "every human being from the moment of fertilization, cloning or the functional equivalent thereof". If passed, it would have been illegal to get an abortion in the state of Mississippi.

=== Judicial history ===
The US Supreme Court's decision in 1973's Roe v. Wade ruling meant individual states could no longer regulate abortion in the first trimester. On July 11, 2012, a Mississippi federal judge ordered an extension of his temporary order to allow the state's only abortion clinic to stay open. The order was to stay in place until U.S. District Judge Daniel Porter Jordan III could review newly drafted rules on how the Mississippi Department of Health would administer a new abortion law. The law in question came into effect on July 1, 2012.

On March 20, 2018, a federal district court in Mississippi enacted a temporary, 10-day ban of the enforcement of the Gestational Age Act due to its conflict with the established rights of the woman under Roe v. Wade. The challenge to these decisions had been petitioned to the Supreme Court, which in May 2021 certified the petition, to be heard as Dobbs v. Jackson Women's Health Organization. The case was argued on December 1, 2021. The Supreme Court overturned Roe v. Wade in Dobbs v. Jackson Women's Health Organization in 2022.

=== Clinic history ===
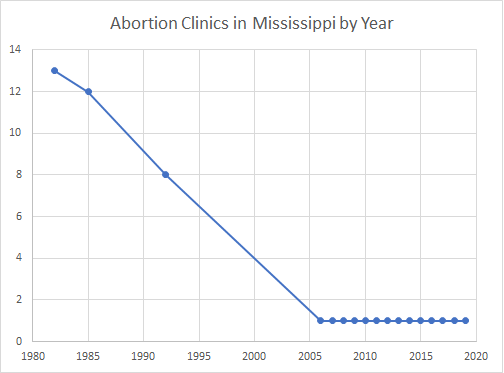
Total number of abortion clinics by year in Mississippi

In the 1980s, there were around a dozen operating abortion clinics in the state. Between 1982 and 1992, the number of abortion clinics in the state decreased by five, going from thirteen in 1982 to eight in 1992. Since around 2006, Jackson Women's Health Organization had been the only operating abortion clinic in Mississippi. In 2010, the color of the building changed from beige to hot pink after the building was acquired by a new owner.

In 2012, Jackson Women's Health almost closed as a result of a new state law being passed that required the clinic to have medical staff with hospital admitting privileges. None of the hospitals in Jackson wanted to give the qualified OB-GYNs on staff at the clinic those privileges. The clinic was saved at the last minute after a judge ruled in their favor.

In 2014, there was still only one abortion clinic in Mississippi. 99% of the counties in the state did not have an abortion clinic. That year, 91% of women in the state aged 15–44 lived in a county without an abortion clinic. Around 90% of Jackson Women's Health services were abortion related in 2017. They saw around 30 to 40 patients per week. In 2017, there was only one Planned Parenthood clinic, which did not offer abortion services, in a state with a population of 694,045 women aged 15–49. As of July 21, 2017, Kentucky, Louisiana, Mississippi, North Dakota, West Virginia, and Wyoming were the only six states that did not have a Planned Parenthood clinic offering abortion services. In May 2019, the state was officially one of six in the nation with only one abortion clinic.

In 2022, Jackson Women's Health closed and was sold following the decision in Dobbs v. Jackson Women's Health Organization. The building was later painted white and converted into a consignment store. The state now has no abortion clinics.

In 2024, Planned Parenthood Southeast closed the Mississippi clinic, citing an emergency provider shortage. The state now has no Planned Parenthood clinics.

== Statistics ==
In the period between 1972 and 1974, the state had an illegal abortion mortality rate per million women aged 15–44 of between 0.1 and 0.9. In 1990, 289,000 women in the state faced the risk of an unintended pregnancy. In 2010, the state had zero publicly funded abortions. In 2014, 59% of adults said in a poll by the Pew Research Center that abortion should be illegal in all or most cases while 36% believed it should be legal. According to a 2014 Public Religion Research Institute (PRRI) study, just under 60% of white women, the same percentage as white men, in the state believed that abortion be illegal in all or most cases. In 2017, medical and surgical abortions were split at around 50% each. The 2023 American Values Atlas reported that, in their most recent survey, 50% of Mississippians said that abortion should be legal in all or most cases, and 49% said it should be illegal in all or most cases.

Number of reported abortions, abortion rate and percentage change in rate by geographic region and state in 1992, 1995 and 1996
Census division and state	Number			Rate			% change 1992–1996
Census division and state	1992	1995	1996	1992	1995	1996	% change 1992–1996
Total	1,528,930	1,363,690	1,365,730	25.9	22.9	22.9	–12
East South Central	54,060	44,010	46,100	14.9	12	12.5	–17
Alabama	17,450	14,580	15,150	18.2	15	15.6	–15
Kentucky	10,000	7,770	8,470	11.4	8.8	9.6	–16
Mississippi	7,550	3,420	4,490	12.4	5.5	7.2	–42
Tennessee	19,060	18,240	17,990	16.2	15.2	14.8	–8

Number, rate, and ratio of reported abortions, by reporting area of residence and occurrence and by percentage of abortions obtained by out-of-state residents, US CDC estimates
Location	Residence			Occurrence			% obtained by out-of-state residents	Year	Ref
Location	No.	Rate^	Ratio^^	No.	Rate^	Ratio^^	% obtained by out-of-state residents	Year	Ref
Mississippi				7,550	12.4			1992	
Mississippi				3,420	5.5			1995	
Mississippi				4,490	7.2			1996	
Mississippi	5,104	8.5	132	2,303	3.8	59	3.6	2014	
Mississippi	4,699	7.8	122	2,613	4.4	68	5.1	2015	
Mississippi	4,708	7.9	124	2,569	4.3	68	6.3	2016	
^number of abortions per 1,000 women aged 15–44; ^^number of abortions per 1,000 live births

== Abortion rights views and activities ==
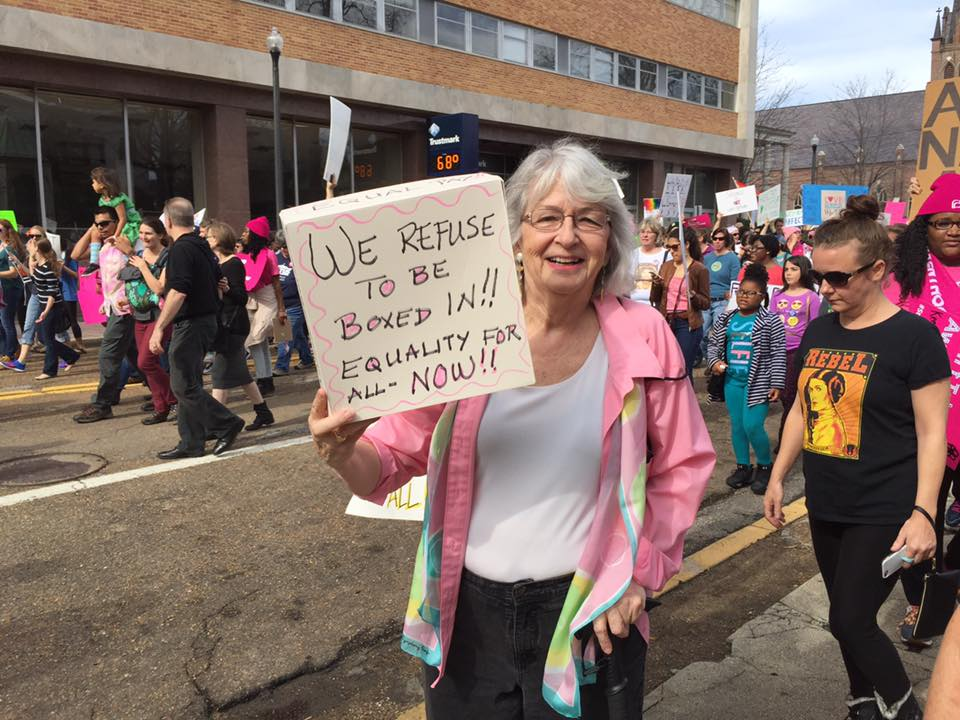
Women's March in Jackson, Mississippi, USA, in 2017

=== Organizations ===
Mississippi Reproductive Freedom Fund assists women, primarily African American women, "offer[ing] financial assistance and practical support to persons seeking abortion as well as free emergency contraception, community based comprehensive sex education and fighting for reproductive justice in Mississippi". It was founded by Laurie Bertram Roberts.

=== Funding ===
After Mississippi passed abortion restrictions in 2019, Mississippi Reproductive Freedom Fund received a huge number of donations in the course of a single week totaling more than US$14,000.

=== Protests ===
Women from the state participated in marches supporting abortion rights as part of a #StoptheBans movement in May 2019.

Following the overturn of Roe v. Wade on June 24, 2022, abortion rights protests were held in Jackson, Gulfport, and Hattiesburg.

== Anti-abortion rights views and activities ==
=== Activities ===
During the 1980s and 1990s, anti-abortion rights activists protested at different clinics around Jackson.

As of 2017, Jackson Women's Health had around 10 protesters outside their clinic on a daily basis.
