= Arizona v. City and County of San Francisco =

- Supreme Court of the United States

Argued February 23, 2022 Decided June 15, 2022
- Full case name: Arizona, et al. v. City and County of San Francisco, California, et al.
- Docket no.: 20-1775
- Citations: 596 U.S. 763 (more)
- Argument: Oral argument

Court membership
- Chief Justice John Roberts Associate Justices Clarence Thomas · Stephen Breyer; Samuel Alito · Sonia Sotomayor; Elena Kagan · Neil Gorsuch; Brett Kavanaugh · Amy Coney Barrett

Case opinions
- Per curiam
- Concurrence: Roberts, joined by Thomas, Alito, Gorsuch

Arizona v. City and County of San Francisco, 596 U.S. 763 (2022), was a United States Supreme Court case related to the ability of states to defend federal regulations in court. However, rather than resolving the questions presented, the Supreme Court dismissed review of the case as improvidently granted.

== Background ==
The Trump administration issued the public charge rule in 2019. The rule was intended to prevent recent non-citizen immigrants to the United States from becoming eligible for public assistance. Before the regulation took effect, various courts enjoined its enforcement. Lawsuits were filed in California, Illinois, New York, Maryland, and other states. The Supreme Court stayed nationwide injunctions issued by district courts in New York and Illinois in January and February 2020. In December 2020, the United States Court of Appeals for the Ninth Circuit held by a 2–1 vote that the public charge rule was unlawful. Certiorari was granted in a case reviewing the similar judgment of the United States Court of Appeals for the Second Circuit in February 2021. That case, Department of Homeland Security v. New York, was dismissed by an agreement between the Biden administration and the plaintiffs in March 2021. A coalition of states led by Arizona attempted to intervene in defense of the rule in multiple courts across the country and were unsuccessful each time. That coalition then appealed the Ninth Circuit case to the Supreme Court.

== Supreme Court ==
The court granted certiorari on October 29, 2021. The court heard oral arguments on February 23, 2022. Arizona Attorney General Mark Brnovich argued for the petitioners. During oral arguments, Justice Stephen Breyer commented that a claim was "pretty similar to what we just allowed in that case of the attorney general", inadvertently revealing the Court's decision in Cameron v. EMW Women's Surgical Center, P.S.C. eight days before it was published.

On June 15, 2022, the Supreme Court dismissed the petition as improvidently granted. Chief Justice John Roberts concurred.

== See also ==
- List of United States Supreme Court leaks
