= Greer Donley =

American attorney

- Born: United States
- Education: Claremont McKenna College; University of Michigan School of Law
- Known for: abortion law bioethics
- Awards: Haub Law Emerging Scholar Award in Women, Gender & Law; Chancellor's Distinguished Research Award
- Scientific career
- Fields: Law
- Workplaces: National Institutes of Health; University of Pittsburgh School of Law

Greer Donley is an American attorney known for her expertise in abortion law and her advocacy for abortion rights. Donley is an associate professor of law at the University of Pittsburgh School of Law and a John E. Murray Faculty Scholar. Donley was influential in drafting a 2022 law in Connecticut that shields residents from the antiabortion movement, a law that has since been modeled in other states. She was the 11th most downloaded law professor in 2022.

== Early life and education ==
Donley pursued her undergraduate degree at Claremont McKenna College, majoring in philosophy and ethics. After graduating in 2009, Donley pursued a fellowship at the National Institutes of Health in the Department of Bioethics. Donley then pursued her Juris Doctor degree at the University of Michigan Law School, graduating in 2014. During her time at the University of Michigan, Donley served as the editor-in-chief for the Michigan Journal of Gender and Law.

== Career ==
After law school, Donley worked as an associate in the office of Latham and Watkins, LLP in Washington, D.C., where she focused on healthcare-related cases. From 2017 to 2018, Donley clerked for Judge Robert Sack on the U.S. Court of Appeals on the Second Circuit.

In 2018, Donley joined the University of Pittsburgh School of Law faculty. She holds the John E. Murray Faculty Scholar and is a Pittsburgh School of Law associate professor. She also directs the Law and Bioethics joint degree program at the University of Pittsburgh. Donley is also a board member for the Women's Law Project.

=== Abortion legislation ===
In 2022, Donley and her colleagues published a paper exploring the complex new legal dynamics that emerge as abortion legislation is dictated at the level of each state post-Roe v. Wade. Her work inspired a new law in Connecticut, that Donley helped draft, which protects individuals from the anti-abortion legislation in other states where citizens are allowed to sue people that assist in abortion procedures. Donley's efforts led to the "first abortion shield law in the country". This law became the model for other laws and protections created by other states across the U.S.

== Honors and awards ==
- 2023 - Chancellor's Distinguished Research Award - Junior Category
- 2022 - 11th most downloaded professor SSRN
- 2022 - Iris Marion Young Award
- 2020 - Haub Law Emerging Scholar Award in Women, Gender & Law
- Robert T Harper Excellence in Teaching Award

== Select media publications and features ==
Donley has written multiple op-eds in the New York Times, Slate Magazine, and Time and has been featured in many news articles discussing abortion legislation.

- What Happened to Kate Cox Is Tragic, and Completely Expected
- Abortion Pills Will Change a Post-Roe World
- Those Pregnancy Tissue Photos Were Destined to Backfire on Abortion Rights Supporters
- Two Courts Ruled on Abortion in Emergency Situations. One Got It Right
- Dems want to focus on abortion rights. A Trump ally may have just helped
- A Black woman in Ohio was charged after miscarrying in her bathroom. Experts warn of the dangerous precedent

== Select publications ==
- Cohen, David S. and Donley, Greer and Rebouche, Rachel, The New Abortion Battleground (January 28, 2023). 123 Columbia Law Review 1 (2023)
- Donley, Greer and Lens, Jill Wieber, Abortion, Pregnancy Loss, & Subjective Fetal Personhood (June 1, 2022). Vanderbilt Law Review, Vol. 75, p. 1649, 2022, U. of Pittsburgh Legal Studies Research Paper No. 2022-16
- Cohen, David S. and Donley, Greer and Rebouche, Rachel, Rethinking Strategy After Dobbs (July 8, 2022). 75 Stanford Law Review Online (Forthcoming), Temple University Legal Studies Research Paper No. 2022-19, U. of Pittsburgh Legal Studies Research Paper No. 2022-20
- Donley, Greer, Medication Abortion Exceptionalism (March 1, 2021). Greer Donley, Medication Abortion Exceptionalism, 107 Cornell Law Rev., 627 (2022), U. of Pittsburgh Legal Studies Research Paper No. 2021-09
- Greer Donley, Does the Constitution Protect Abortions Based on Fetal Anomaly?: Examining the Potential for Disability-Selective Abortion Bans in the Age of Prenatal Whole Genome Sequencing, 20 Mich. J. Gender & L. 291 (2013).
