= Jackson Women's Health Organization =

Women's health clinic in Mississippi, US

- Abbreviation: JWHO
- Nickname: Pink House
- Successor: Las Cruces Women's Health Organization
- Established: 1995; 31 years ago
- Dissolved: July 6, 2022; 4 years ago
- Type: Reproductive health and abortion clinic
- Location(s): 2903 N State Street; Jackson, Mississippi
- Owner: Diane Derzis
- Administrator: Shannon Brewer
- Affiliations: National Abortion Federation
- Website: Current website

Jackson Women's Health Organization (abbreviated JWHO and commonly known as the Pink House) was an abortion clinic located in a bright pink building in Jackson, Mississippi's Fondren neighborhood. It was the only abortion clinic in Mississippi since the closure of the New Women's Medical Center in 2006. The JWHO closed its doors on July 6, 2022, following the Supreme Court of the United States' decision in Dobbs v. Jackson Women's Health Organization, and the day before Mississippi's near-complete abortion ban went into effect.

The administrator of JWHO moved to Las Cruces, New Mexico, and opened up a new abortion clinic called Las Cruces Women's Health Organization (LCWHO), due to New Mexico's liberal abortion laws. LCWHO is known as "The Pink House West”.

The clinic was established in 1995. JWHO provided multiple reproductive health services, including abortions up to 16 weeks, birth control and checkups. The clinic was a member of the National Abortion Federation, which sets compliance standards for abortions to ensure the safety of patients and provide attentive care. The medical staff at JWHO consisted of OB/GYNs, licensed nurses, technicians, and counselors.

== Legal challenges ==
Mississippi politicians, including Governor Phil Bryant, attempted to close JWHO with TRAP laws since 2012, when Bryant signed a law requiring doctors who perform abortions to have admitting privileges at a local hospital. This was problematic for JWHO, because neither of its two doctors who performed abortions had such privileges. In response to the law, JWHO filed for a restraining order to allow them to remain open temporarily. On Sunday, July 1, 2012, a federal judge granted them this order, preventing enforcement of the law until at least July 11, 2012.

In 2013, Derzis told ABC News that both of JWHO's doctors lived out-of-state and flew in every week to work there. In April 2013, Judge Daniel Porter Jordan III issued a ruling blocking part of the law that would have closed JWHO.

In 2014, a divided panel of judges on the United States Court of Appeals for the Fifth Circuit issued a decision blocking Mississippi from using the law to close JWHO. In a statement accompanying the ruling, Judge E. Grady Jolly wrote, "Mississippi may not shift its obligation to respect the established constitutional rights of its citizens to another state." In 2016, the Supreme Court refused to review the 2014 decision, thereby allowing it to stand.

In March 2015, JWHO was vandalized, with security cameras destroyed and a generator severely damaged. As of 2022, the clinic's owner was Diane Derzis.

In March 2017, a U.S. federal court permanently blocked the state of Mississippi from closing JWHO for noncompliance with the law, while still allowing the law to move forward.

Additional cases were filed in March 2018 and December 2019. In a 2018 lawsuit, the plaintiffs said that there was a specific point at which the abortion would be wrongful ("Gestational Age Act"). This point was determined under the Gestational Age Act as 15 weeks. This was later blocked by United States District Judge Carlton W. Reeves and upheld at the Fifth Circuit.

The state challenged the case where it was certified by the Supreme Court as Dobbs v. Jackson Women's Health Organization in May 2021, to be heard in the 2021–22 term. Oral arguments in court for Dobbs v. Jackson Women's Organization began on December 1, 2021. On September 20, 2021, the American College of Obstetricians and Gynecologists (ACOG) and 24 medical organizations submitted an amicus brief in support of Jackson's Women's Health Organization. They deemed the ban on abortions after 15 weeks as a threat to safe medical care for women. In June 2022, the Supreme Court ruled that there existed no constitutional right to abortion, and upheld the Mississippi law, overturning the precedent set in 1973 by Roe v. Wade and in 1992 by Planned Parenthood v. Casey. Derzis announced in July that the clinic would close permanently, and that the building had been sold.

As of January 2023, the former clinic in Mississippi has been converted into a consignment store and was painted white.
