= Joan Biskupic =

American journalist (born 1956)

- Born: 1955 or 1956 (age 70–71); Chicago, IL
- Education: Marquette University (BA); University of Oklahoma (MA); Georgetown University (JD)
- Occupations: Journalist; author
- Relatives: Steven M. Biskupic (brother)
- Writing career
- Genre: Non-fiction

Joan Marie Biskupic (born c. 1956) is an American journalist, biographer, and lawyer who has covered the United States Supreme Court since 1989.

== Early life and education ==
Biskupic is one of nine siblings born to a Catholic family of Croatian and Irish descent. She received her high school diploma from Benet Academy in Lisle, Illinois, a B.A. degree in journalism from Marquette University, an M.A. degree in English from the University of Oklahoma, and a J.D. degree from the Georgetown University Law Center. One of her brothers, Steven M. Biskupic (born 1961), was a U.S. attorney for the Eastern District of Wisconsin who later assumed private practice. Another brother, Vince Biskupic, is a judge on the Outagamie County Circuit Court.

== Career ==
From 1989 to 1992, Biskupic was a legal affairs writer for Congressional Quarterly. She was awarded the 1991 Everett McKinley Dirksen Award for Distinguished Reporting on Congress for her coverage of the Clarence Thomas hearings for Congressional Quarterly. Prior to that, she covered government and politics for the Milwaukee Journal and the Tulsa Tribune.

From 1992 to 2000, she was the Supreme Court reporter for The Washington Post. From 2000 to 2012 she was the legal affairs correspondent for USA Today. Her work was a finalist for the Pulitzer Prize for Explanatory Reporting in 2015. She was editor in charge, legal affairs for Reuters from 2012 to 2016. During the 2016–17 academic year, she was a visiting professor at the University of California, Irvine's School of Law.

As of August 2024, she is a full-time Supreme Court analyst at CNN. She also regularly appears as a commentator on other television and radio programs. She is a regular panelist on Washington Week and has appeared on The Diane Rehm Show, The Today Show, Good Morning America, Nightline, Face the Nation, and Stay Tuned with Preet.

Biskupic has written books on the Supreme Court, including biographies of Supreme Court Justices Sandra Day O'Connor, Antonin Scalia, and Sonia Sotomayor, and Chief Justice John Roberts. She was awarded three residential fellowships at the Woodrow Wilson International Center for Scholars, in 2003, 2004 and 2008, for work on these biographies.

== Honors ==
She has been a member of the District of Columbia bar since 1994. Biskupic received honorary Doctors of Laws degrees from Marquette University in May 2010, and Georgetown University in May 2014.

== Publications ==
Title	Year	ISBN	Publisher	Subject matter	Interviews, presentations, and reviews	Comments
The Supreme Court Yearbook 1989–1990	1991	ISBN 9780871875907	Congressional Quarterly			
The Supreme Court Yearbook 1990–1991	1992	ISBN 9780871876379	Congressional Quarterly			
The Supreme Court Yearbook 1991–1992	1993	ISBN 9780871877161	Congressional Quarterly			
Guide to the U.S. Supreme Court (third edition)	1996	ISBN 9781568021300	Congressional Quarterly			Written with Elder Witt.
The Supreme Court and Individual Rights (third edition)	1978	ISBN 9781568022390	Congressional Quarterly			Written with Elder Witt.
The Supreme Court at Work (second edition)	1997	ISBN 9781568023236	Congressional Quarterly			Written with Elder Witt.
The Supreme Court and the Powers of the American Government	1997	ISBN 9781568023243	Congressional Quarterly			Written with Elder Witt.
Sandra Day O'Connor: How the First Woman on the Supreme Court Became Its Most Influential Justice	2005	ISBN 9780060590185	Ecco	Sandra Day O'Connor	Presentation by Biskupic on Sandra Day O'Connor, October 23, 2005, C-SPAN	
American Original: The Life and Constitution of Supreme Court Justice Antonin Scalia	2009	ISBN 9780374202897	Sarah Crichton Books	Antonin Scalia	After Words interview with Biskupic on American Original, December 12, 2009, C-SPAN	
Breaking In: The Rise of Sonia Sotomayor and the Politics of Justice	2014	ISBN 9780374298746	Sarah Crichton Books	Sonia Sotomayor		
The Chief: The Life and Turbulent Times of Chief Justice John Roberts	2019	ISBN 9780465093274	Basic Books	John Roberts	Presentation by Biskupic on The Chief, March 28, 2019, C-SPAN; Q&A interview with Biskupic on The Chief, March 31, 2019, C-SPAN	
Nine Black Robes: Inside the Supreme Court's Drive to the Right and Its Historic Consequences	2023	ISBN 9780063052789	William Morrow	Roberts Court	Q&A interview with Biskupic on Nine Black Robes, April 9, 2023, C-SPAN "Book Review: 'Nine Black Robes,' by Joan Biskupic". The New York Times. April 10, 2023.	
