= Nine Black Robes =

Book about the American Supreme Court

Nine Black Robes: Inside the Supreme Court's Drive to the Right and Its Historic Consequences
- 2023 Book jacket
- Author: Joan Biskupic
- Subject: Judges United States History 21st century, United States Politics and government, United States. Supreme Court History 21st century
- Genre: Creative nonfiction
- Set in: The United States
- Published: 2023
- Publisher: William Morris
- Publication place: United States
- Media type: Print, E-book, Audio
- Pages: 401
- ISBN: 9780063052789
- OCLC: 1373611873
- Website: Official website

Nine Black Robes: Inside the Supreme Court's Drive to the Right and Its Historic Consequences is a nonfiction book written by Joan Biskupic. It was published by William Morrow in 2023.

== Synopsis ==
Biskupic depicts the United States Supreme Court's rightward shift after Donald Trump's appointment of three justices and the consequences of that shift. She also tells the collective story of the Supreme Court. And in this story, the public events that happened during Trump's presidency mesh with lesser-known internal conflicts, as well as behind-the-scenes disagreements among the justices.

Also included in this story are others who helped Trump find and select the nominees, and in what manner the nominees themselves were directed through the vetting and Senate hearings. Furthermore, Biskupic sheds light on a reticent Supreme Court, an institution usually closed off to public scrutiny. The book additionally shows that the court is struggling with serious issues.

== Background ==
Biskupic has extensive experience as a journalist. She was a reporter for the Washington Post and is currently a CNN analyst. Prior to writing Nine Black Robes, she wrote four well-received individual Supreme Court Justices' biographies: Chief Justice John Roberts, and Justices Antonin Scalia, Sandra Day O'Connor, and Sonia Sotomayor. The book chronicles six years from the 2016 death of Justice Antonin Scalia to Justice Ketanji Brown Jackson's nomination in 2022 by President Joe Biden. The author conducted more than one hundred interviews for this book, including "a majority of the justices".

== Contrasting views ==
Contrasting views about the tenor of this book are presented and discussed in the American media.

Sam Tanenhaus, writing for the New York Times, says this book is "informative, briskly paced and gracefully written." Laurence Tribe, for the New York Review refers to this book as "notable" and that the author "pulls no punches". Quinta Jurecic of the Washington Post says, "Biskupic opens a window onto the opaque, insular world of the justices..."

However, Kyle Peterson, reviewing this book for The Wall Street Journal, contrasts with those other media outlets by describing Biskupic's book as partisan rather than objective. Likewise, George Leef, who wrote a short review of this book for the National Review, also assessed the book as partisan. In his review, Leef cites a critique of this book by John O. McGinnis writing for Law & Liberty.

== See also ==
- Joe Biden Supreme Court candidates
- Donald Trump Supreme Court candidates
- U.S. Supreme Court
