= Mississippi State Department of Health =

Government organization in Jackson, United States

Agency overview
- Formed: 1877
- Jurisdiction: State of Mississippi
- Headquarters: 570 East Woodrow Wilson Dr; Jackson, Mississippi
- Agency executive: Daniel Edney, MD, FACP, FASAM, State Health Officer
- Website: msdh.ms.gov

The Mississippi State Department of Health (MSDH) is the primary state health agency of the government of the U.S. state of Mississippi. It was established in 1877 as the Mississippi State Board of Health and was renamed in 1982. It provides a number of public health services to Mississippi residents.
