= Hemphill v. New York =

- Supreme Court of the United States

Argued October 5, 2021 Decided January 20, 2022
- Full case name: Darrell Hemphill, Petitioner v. New York
- Docket no.: 20-637
- Citations: 595 U.S. 140 (more)

Questions presented
- When, if ever, does a criminal defendant who “opens the door” to evidence that would otherwise be barred by the rules of evidence also forfeit his right to exclude evidence otherwise barred by the Confrontation Clause?

Holding
- A criminal defendant does not forfeit his confrontation right merely by making an argument in his defense based on a testimonial out-of-court statement like a plea allocution.

Court membership
- Chief Justice John Roberts Associate Justices Clarence Thomas · Stephen Breyer; Samuel Alito · Sonia Sotomayor; Elena Kagan · Neil Gorsuch; Brett Kavanaugh · Amy Coney Barrett

Case opinions
- Majority: Sotomayor, joined by Roberts, Breyer, Alito, Kagan, Gorsuch, Kavanaugh, Barrett
- Concurrence: Alito, joined by Kavanaugh
- Dissent: Thomas

Laws applied
- U.S. Const. amends. VI

Hemphill v. New York, 595 U.S. 140 (2022), was a decision by the United States Supreme Court involving the application of Confrontation Clause of the Sixth Amendment to the United States Constitution. In its decision, the Court ruled on when a criminal defendant who opens the door to otherwise inadmissible evidence also opens the door to evidence that would otherwise be excluded by the Confrontation Clause.

== Prior History ==
In 2012, the New York Court of Appeals ruled in People v. Reid, 971 N.E. 2d 353 (2012)., on whether a defendant can open the door to testimony that would otherwise be inadmissible under the Confrontation Clause. In its decision, the court agreed with the consensus of several other United States Courts of Appeals that it is possible for a defendant to open the door to evidence that would otherwise be barred by the Confrontation Clause. It argued that if such evidence were inadmissible regardless of the defendant's questions at trial, then a defendant could mislead a jury by selectively recounting potentially exculpatory details from a testimonial out-of-court statement, while neglecting other details from this statement that would tend to explain and contextualize the portions that had been introduced. The court also noted that its ruling was consistent with its jurisprudence regarding the admissibility of statements collected in violation of Miranda v. Arizona. Such statements are admissible if a defendant opens the door by presenting conflicting testimony at trial. Quoting Harris v. New York, 401 U.S. 222 (1971), it said:

...[t]he shield provided by Miranda cannot be perverted into a license to use perjury by way of a defense, free from the risk of confrontation with prior inconsistent utterances.

== Background ==
In April 2006, two men became involved in a fight with a group of other people on a street in the Bronx. During the fight, a stray 9-millimeter bullet struck and killed a 2-year-old child seated in a passing car. With the help of eyewitnesses, police identified Nicholas Morris as the shooter and Ronnell Gillam as another participant in the fight.

Police searched Morris's apartment and found one 9-millimeter cartridge and several .357 revolver rounds. He was subsequently arrested. Although Gilliam initially identified Morris as the shooter, he later recanted this statement and indicated that Morris's cousin, Darrell Hemphill, was the shooter. Disregarding this recantation, the police charged Morris with the murder of the child and the possession of a 9-millimeter handgun. However, the prosecution ended in a mistrial.

After the mistrial, the police offered Morris a plea deal: the murder charge would be dismissed if Morris would plead guilty to the possession of a .357 revolver at the scene of the shooting - despite the fact that a 9-millimeter handgun had already been established as the murder weapon. As such, the prosecution lacked sufficient evidence to prove Morris's possession of the .357 revolver, so Morris supplied this evidence through his own allocution.

Years after the trial, Hemphill was indicted for the murder of the child after his DNA was found on a blue sweater found in Morris's apartment shortly after the murder. During his trial, Hemphill elicited undisputed testimony from a prosecution witness stating that police had found 9-millimeter rounds from Morris's apartment, thus implicating Morris as the culprit. Morris was unable to testify at Hemphill's trial because he was out of the country at the time. So, in order to rebut Hemphill's implication that Morris was the culprit, the prosecution sought to admit parts of the transcript of Morris's plea allocution, in which he admitted to possession of the .357 revolver, not the 9-millimeter handgun that Hemphill's questions misleadingly implicated Morris in possessing.

Hemphill's counsel sought to exclude Morris's allocution transcript from evidence, citing that Morris's out-of-court statements had not been subject to cross-examination. Despite this, the court ruled that Hemphill's arguments and evidence at trial had opened the door to this otherwise inadmissible evidence, in order to allow the prosecution to correct the misleading impression that Hemphill had created.

The jury found Hemphill guilty. Later, both the New York Appellate Division and the Court of Appeals affirmed Hemphill's conviction.

== Supreme Court Opinions ==
In an 8–1 decision authored by Justice Sotomayor, the court held that a criminal defendant does not waive his right to confront adverse witnesses simply by making an argument based on testimonial out-of-court statements such as plea allocutions. Justice Alito authored a concurring opinion in which he addresses the conditions under which a defendant will have waived his right to confront adverse witnesses. Justice Clarence Thomas wrote a dissenting opinion in which he disputes the Court's jurisdiction to hear the case.

=== Sotomayor's Majority Opinion ===
The Confrontation Clause of the Sixth Amendment provides criminal defendants the right to confront all adverse witnesses against them. In the opinion, the Court drew on the historical examination of the confrontation right that was seen in past cases, such as Crawford v. Washington, which stated that “the principal evil at which the Confrontation Clause was directed was the civil-law mode of criminal procedure,” which allowed the “use of ex parte examinations as evidence against the accused”. The Court in Crawford reasoned that, since the text of the Confrontation Clause did not allow the possibility of open-ended exceptions to the rule as determined by the courts, the Clause should be read as including only the exceptions that would have been present at the time it was written. To that point, the Crawford court argued that the Framers would not have allowed such out-of-court testimony to be admissible, unless the witness was unable to testify at trial and the defendant had a prior opportunity to cross-examine the witness.

Regarding the New York Court of Appeals decision in People v. Reid, the opinion rejects the appellate court's notion that the "door-opening" rule established in Reid is an exception to the Confrontation Clause. Rather, it asserts that it is merely a "procedural rule" dictating the manner in which a defendant may assert his confrontation right, and that it does not limit the scope of the right itself. The opinion rejects the notion that it was the responsibility of a judge to determine whether Hemphill's assertion of Morris's responsibility for the shooting was reliable, credible, or even that it had the opportunity to mislead the jury. It also rejected the notion that it was the responsibility of a judge to determine whether the admission of Morris's allocution was necessary in order to correct this misleading assertion.

The opinion rejects the State's assertion that the rule in Reid is necessary for courts to carry out their primary duty – to ascertain facts – by preventing the introduction of misleading evidence. While this task is important, the Court has never allowed this consideration to override the protections afforded to criminal defendants by the Sixth Amendment to the United States Constitution.

Lastly, the opinion contends with the assertion that a reversal of Hemphill's conviction would leave prosecutors without recourse to protect against the abuse of the confrontation right. Quoting Holmes v. South Carolina, the Court notes that “well-established rules” of evidence “permit trial judges to exclude evidence if its probative value is outweighed by certain other factors such as unfair prejudice, confusion of the issues, or potential to mislead the jury”.

=== Alito's Concurring Opinion ===
Alito's opinion begins with establishing the two modes by which a federally guaranteed constitutional right may be waived, either expressly or implicitly. Regarding the former, he states, quoting Johnson v. Zerbst, 304 U.S. 458 (1938), that waiver consists in the "intentional relinquishment or abandonment of a known right or privilege". Regarding the latter, quoting Berghuis v. Thompkins, 560 U.S. 370 (2010), he states that implied waiver can be established through “‘a course of conduct’” even “absent formal or express statements of waiver”.

Alito then addresses past cases in which a defendant's conduct has constituted an implied waiver of his Sixth Amendment right to confront adverse witnesses. As in Melendez-Diaz v. Massachusetts, 557 U.S. 305 (2009), implied waiver may be found in a defendant's "failure to object to the offending evidence". As in Illinois v. Allen, 397 U.S. 337 (1970), implied waiver may also be found in a defendant's “conducting himself in a manner so disorderly, disruptive, and disrespectful of the court that his trial cannot be carried on with him in the courtroom”.

Alito notes that the issue with the appellate court's rule in Reid is that its application in the case was predicated on neither an express nor an implicit waiver of the right to confront adverse witnesses. He does say, however, that there are instances where a defendant's introduction of evidence may amount to an implicit waiver of the right to object to the introduction of the prosecution's evidence that would otherwise be barred by the Confrontation Clause. One such instance relates to the doctrine of completeness. Federal Rules of Evidence #106 states:

If a party introduces all or part of a writing or recorded statement, an adverse party may require the introduction, at that time, of any other part — or any other writing or recorded statement — that in fairness ought to be considered at the same time.

He argues that this analysis is analogous to logic regarding the Fifth Amendment's privilege against self-incrimination. Precedent makes clear that defendants who waive their Fifth Amendment privilege against self-incrimination by testifying in their own defense cannot invoke that same privilege to avoid being cross-examined. In this example, such a defendant purposefully elects which details to disclose in his testimony, and so he cannot reasonably claim a constitutional immunity from being cross-examined on matters that he himself has put before a jury, and has thus deemed disputable. Alito argues that the right to confront adverse witnesses should be analyzed no differently, stating that a defendant's deliberate choice to place portions of statements of an unavailable declarant before the trier of fact (knowing that the declarant is unavailable for cross-examination) implicitly commits him to the trier of fact's examination of the entirety of what the declarant has to say on the subject.

=== Thomas's Dissenting Opinion ===
Thomas's dissent disputes the Supreme Court's jurisdiction over this case. Citing 28 U.S.C. § 1257(a), he indicated that the court may review final judgments from, in this case, the New York Court of Appeals only where a federal right "is specifically set up or claimed" in that court. Since Hemphill did not raise his Sixth Amendment claim in the New York Court of Appeals, Thomas claims that the Supreme Court lacks jurisdiction here to review the lower court's decision.
