= Bullcoming v. New Mexico =

- Supreme Court of the United States

Argued March 2, 2011 Decided June 23, 2011
- Full case name: Donald Bullcoming v. State of New Mexico
- Docket no.: 09-10876
- Citations: 564 U.S. 647 (more) 131 S. Ct. 2705; 180 L. Ed. 2d 610; 2011 U.S. LEXIS 4790

Case history
- Prior: Conviction affirmed, 2008 NMCA 97, 144 N.M. 546, 189 P.3d 679; affirmed, 2010 NMSC 007, 147 N.M. 487, 226 P.3d 1; cert. granted, 561 U.S. 1058 (2010).

Holding
- A second surrogate analyst's testimony about the statements in the forensic report of a separate certifying analyst violates the Confrontation Clause.

Court membership
- Chief Justice John Roberts Associate Justices Antonin Scalia · Anthony Kennedy; Clarence Thomas · Ruth Bader Ginsburg; Stephen Breyer · Samuel Alito; Sonia Sotomayor · Elena Kagan

Case opinions
- Majority: Ginsburg, joined by Scalia; Sotomayor, Kagan (all but Part IV); Thomas (all but Part IV and footnote 6)
- Concurrence: Sotomayor (in part)
- Dissent: Kennedy, joined by Roberts, Breyer, Alito

Laws applied
- U.S. Const. amend. VI

Bullcoming v. New Mexico, 564 U.S. 647 (2011), is a significant 6th Amendment Confrontation Clause case decided by the United States Supreme Court. On June 23, 2011, the Supreme Court considered the issue whether a defendant's Confrontation Clause rights extend to a non-testifying laboratory analyst whose supervisor testifies as to test results that the analyst transcribed from a machine. In a five to four decision authored by Justice Ginsburg, the Court held that the second surrogate analyst could not testify about the testimonial statements in the forensic report of the certifying analyst under the Confrontation Clause.

The case follows a line of decisions, including Crawford v. Washington (2004) and Davis v. Washington (2006), that altered the Court's interpretation of the Confrontation Clause guarantee and clarified its application only to "testimonial" statements.

== Background ==
Donald Bullcoming of New Mexico was arrested on suspicion of driving while intoxicated. He was sentenced to two years in prison for a felony aggravated DWI/DUI. At the trial, the State used a blood alcohol test that was taken under a search warrant after Bullcoming refused to take a breathalyzer test. At his trial, the prosecution presented a lab report indicating that his blood-alcohol levels were elevated. But rather than calling the technician who had prepared and signed the report, prosecutors called a colleague who had not observed or reviewed the analysis.

== Issue ==
Whether the Confrontation Clause permits the prosecution to introduce testimonial statements of a nontestifying forensic analyst through the in-court testimony of a supervisor or other person who did not perform or observe the laboratory analysis described in the statements.

== Procedural history ==
On February 12, 2010, the New Mexico Supreme Court issued its written decision, cited at 147 N.M. 487, 226 P.3d 1. On March 2, 2011, the oral argument before the United States Supreme Court took place, during which Jeffrey L. Fisher argued on behalf of the Petitioner and Gary King argued on behalf of the Respondent. The United States Supreme Court issued its written decision on June 23, 2011.

== Decision of the Supreme Court ==
In a 5 to 4 decision in favor of Bullcoming, Justice Ginsburg wrote the majority opinion for the Court. The US Supreme Court ruled that the Sixth Amendment gives a criminal defendant the right "to be confronted with the witnesses against him," and that "surrogate testimony" is not good enough.

== See also ==
- Melendez-Diaz v. Massachusetts (2009)
