= Evidence-based prosecution =

Case evaluation based on data collection and analysis

Evidence-based prosecution (sometimes termed "victimless prosecution") refers to a collection of techniques utilized by prosecutors in domestic violence cases to convict abusers without the cooperation of an alleged victim. It is widely practiced within the American legal system by specialized prosecutors and state's attorneys and relies on utilizing a variety of evidence to prove the guilt of an abuser with limited or adverse participation by the abuser's victim, or even no participation at all.

== Context within domestic violence prosecution ==
Evidence-based Prosecution arose from the unique challenges facing prosecutors in domestic violence cases. While domestic abuse has been prevalent throughout history and its impacts severe, only in recent decades has prosecution been undertaken aggressively. Since the 1970s, increased public awareness has led to tougher laws and an ever-expanding role for law enforcement and the criminal court system in what had previously been regarded as "a family matter". While in the 1980s as little as 5% of domestic abuse cases with injuries would be routinely prosecuted, in 2010, the rate in some jurisdictions approached 80%.

Prosecutors managing these cases face a constant problem of victims who are unable or unwilling to cooperate with prosecution. In jurisdictions with aggressive enforcement of domestic violence laws, approximately 65-70% of victims do not cooperate with prosecution. This occurs for a variety of reasons and includes seeking dismissal of charges, lying to prosecutors or police, recanting statements about the abuse, refusing to talk about the abuse, perjuring themselves in court to protect the abuser, or refusing to come to court altogether.

Evidence-based prosecution arose from the desire to prosecute individuals in domestic violence cases either without placing pressure on the victim to cooperate when she or he might face retaliation or other dangers from doing so, or when such pressure is applied but ineffective. It was first used in the 1980s, but did not become widespread until the 1990s. By 2004, it was actually preferred by some prosecutors, who reported higher conviction rates without victim cooperation than with it. As of 2010, the use of evidence-based prosecution is strongly encouraged, if not mandated, for agencies receiving federal funding through the STOP Violence Against Women Act.

In its infancy, evidence-based prosecution was often called "victimless prosecution," although this has since become a slang term only, neither factually accurate nor politically correct. As prosecutors and victim advocates frequently point out, evidence-based prosecution often does not deal with a "victimless" crime, nor does it seek to remove the victim or her interests from the case, but rather seeks to focus on the crime and its impact without relying on the victim's participation. Of course, all prosecutions are based on evidence, so the term "evidence-based" prosecution, while politically correct, is not at all descriptive. In context, "evidence-based" prosecution is best understood as a prosecution without any testimony from most or all of the principal witnesses and instead making effective use of all remaining or alternative forms of evidence.

== Evidence used ==
The most common pieces of evidence used in evidence-based prosecution are: 911 call recordings and transcripts, Child witness statements, Neighbor witness statements, Medical records, Paramedic log sheets, Prior police reports, Restraining orders, Booking records, Letters from the suspect, Videotaped/Audio taped interviews with the victim, and Defendant's statements.

The basic techniques in utilizing these and other pieces of evidence loosely resemble the use of circumstantial evidence in murder cases (in which, of course, the victim is never available to testify). For instance, a recording of a 911 call by the victim might be used to convey what happened to the judge or jury if the victim is not in court to testify, refuses to talk about what happened, or is not truthful about it. Likewise, statements from the Defendant in the case, such as to police officers or detectives, might be introduced to show inconsistencies or admissions about the abuse.

The evidence is often complemented by the use of expert witness testimony from a domestic violence expert, often an experienced victim advocate, researcher, or law enforcement officer. The expert witness helps explain to a judge or jury the reasons a victim may be absent or testifying on behalf of the alleged abuser, as well as educating them on the dynamics of domestic violence and victimization.

== Benefits and criticisms ==
The Benefits of evidence-based prosecution are obvious from the prosecutor's point of view. It can result in more convictions of domestic abusers, particularly those who might otherwise go free as a result of their effectiveness in manipulating or threatening their victims to keep them from testifying. It also has the benefit of keeping both uncooperative and cooperative victims safer by placing less emphasis on their role in prosecution and more on that of the State, resulting, at least ideally, in less reason for the abuser to seek revenge against the victim.

Evidence-based prosecution also generates obvious criticisms, from both an ethical and practical prospective. Its use to override a victim's wishes is based upon a paternalistic concept of the State's role in fighting domestic abuse. While prosecutors and victim advocates often contend that an uncooperative victim's desire not to prosecute is based on manipulation and coercion, there are also contrary views.

Many victims of domestic violence constantly make rational choices concerning their own safety and may be in a better position than the prosecutor to judge whether prosecution helps or hurts. Domestic violence most often turns into domestic homicide when the victim is leaving the relationship, something that may be pushed if not forced by aggressive prosecution.

== Changes in the United States following Crawford v. Washington ==
In 2004, the United States Supreme Court decided the case of Crawford v. Washington, in which they reversed the conviction of a defendant who had been found guilty of stabbing a man based partially on statements made by his wife to police, which were introduced at trial under a hearsay exception, despite her not being available to testify. The Court held admitting out of court statements under a hearsay exception, even if deemed reliable by the court, violates a defendant's Sixth Amendment Confrontation Clause right. This new standard replaced a long-standing doctrine set out in Ohio v. Roberts, in which the Court had previously held that a trial court can admit out of court statements under tradition hearsay exceptions so long as the statements had certain indicators of reliability.

The Court's decision had a significant impact on evidence-based prosecution by limiting the use of many of the hearsay exceptions relied upon by prosecutors. Subsequent decisions such as Davis v. Washington have further limited the doctrine specifically regarding 911 call recordings.

These decisions have severely curtailed the number of the cases in which prosecutors can utilize evidence-based prosecution. In order to continue the practice, prosecutors have turned to improving law enforcement training at response and investigation in domestic violence cases so that police gather as much admissible evidence as possible.
