= Maryland v. Craig =

- Supreme Court of the United States

Argued April 18, 1990 Decided June 27, 1990
- Full case name: Maryland v. Sandra A. Craig
- Citations: 497 U.S. 836 (more) 110 S. Ct. 3157; 111 L. Ed. 2d 666; 58 U.S.L.W. 5044; 1990 U.S. LEXIS 3457; 30 Fed. R. Evid. Serv. (Callaghan) 1

Case history
- Prior: Defendant convicted, Circuit Court of Howard County, 9-27-88; affirmed, 544 A.2d 784 (Md. Ct. Spec. App. 1988); reversed, 560 A.2d 1120 (Md. 1989); cert. granted, 493 U.S. 1041 (1990)
- Subsequent: New trial ordered, 588 A.2d 328 (Md. 1991)

Holding
- Testimony by an alleged child sex abuse victim via closed-circuit television did not violate the defendant's Sixth Amendment right to confront witnesses.

Court membership
- Chief Justice William Rehnquist Associate Justices William J. Brennan Jr. · Byron White; Thurgood Marshall · Harry Blackmun; John P. Stevens · Sandra Day O'Connor; Antonin Scalia · Anthony Kennedy

Case opinions
- Majority: O'Connor, joined by Rehnquist, White, Blackmun, Kennedy
- Dissent: Scalia, joined by Brennan, Marshall, Stevens

Laws applied
- U.S. Const. amend. VI

Maryland v. Craig, 497 U.S. 836 (1990), is a U.S. Supreme Court case involving the Sixth Amendment. The Court held that the Sixth Amendment's Confrontation Clause, which provides criminal defendants with the right to confront witnesses against them, did not bar the use of one-way closed-circuit television to present testimony by an alleged child sex abuse victim.

== Background ==
Defendant Sandra A. Craig was charged with sexually abusing a minor child. At trial, the child was reportedly unable to testify in the physical presence of the defendant due to severe emotional trauma. The trial court set her up in a separate room with the judge, the prosecutor, and the defense attorney, so that the defendant and jury could only see her testify via the live television screen in the courtroom, and she could not see them. Craig was convicted, but the Maryland Court of Appeals reversed, ruling that her Sixth Amendment rights were violated by the use of the transmitted testimony, because the Confrontation Clause guaranteed face-to-face confrontation. The state of Maryland sought certiorari to the U.S. Supreme Court, which granted the petition.

== Opinion of the Court ==
In a 5–4 decision, the Supreme Court reversed the Maryland high court, reinstating the conviction. Justice O'Connor wrote for the majority, ruling that the Confrontation Clause merely embodies a "preference" for face-to-face, in person confrontation, which may be limited to satisfy sufficiently important interests. Because the child witness was cross-examined by the defendant's attorney and her general demeanor was visible in the courtroom, the defendant had a constitutionally sufficient opportunity to test her credibility and the substance of her testimony before the jury.

Craig came shortly after the Court had invalidated the use of a screen to hide a similarly situated child witness/victim in Coy v. Iowa (1988). The Court in Coy had found "no individualized findings (that the victims) needed special protection." Indeed, "face-to-face presence may, unfortunately, upset the truthful rape victim or abused child; but by the same token it may confound and undo the false accuser, or reveal the child coached by a malevolent adult." In contrast, the Maryland statute in Craig provided for an exception when a child's testimony would result in "serious emotional distress." Furthermore, the use of one-way closed-circuit TV did not considerably obstruct the jury's observation of the child's testimony.

Justice O'Connor noted that the fundamental purpose of the Sixth Amendment was to prevent ex parte affidavits, citing Mattox v. United States 156 U.S. 237, 242 (1895). She further identified four primary guarantees embodied in the Confrontation Clause:

- The right of "personal examination"
- That a witness will testify under oath
- That a witness will submit to cross-examination
- That the jury may observe the demeanor of the witness in making his statement

The Court noted that hearsay exceptions demonstrated that no defendant had an absolute right to a face-to-face encounter with adversarial witnesses. While the Maryland exception did not provide face-to-face confrontation, the final three preserved guarantees were present. The State's interest in the physical and psychological well-being of child abuse victims could outweigh the defendant's right to face his accusers in court.

=== Dissent ===
Justice Scalia, in dissent, wrote that he was "persuaded...that the Maryland procedure is virtually constitutional. Since it is not, however, actually constitutional I would affirm the judgment of the Maryland Court of Appeals reversing the judgment of conviction."

== Subsequent developments ==
The continued validity of Craig was called into question after the Supreme Court case Crawford v. Washington (2004). In Crawford, the Court overruled Ohio v. Roberts (1980), which Craig relied in large part upon. However, Craig remains good law. During the COVID-19 pandemic, federal courts conducting criminal trials, relied upon Craig to have witnesses testify by "Zoom or some other videoconferencing technology."
