= Jeffrey L. Fisher =

American lawyer

- Born: Jeffrey Louis Fisher; 1970 (age 55–56); Leawood, Kansas, U.S.
- Education: Duke University (BA); University of Michigan (JD)
- Employer(s): O'Melveny & Myers; Stanford Law School
- Known for: Supreme Court Litigation
- Title: Professor of Law; Co-Director, Supreme Court Litigation Clinic

Jeffrey L. Fisher (born 1970) is an American law professor and U.S. Supreme Court litigator who has argued forty-three cases and worked on dozens of others before the Supreme Court. He is co-director of the Stanford Law School Supreme Court Litigation Clinic.

== Legal career ==
Fisher attended Duke University where he graduated cum laude in 1992 with a B.A. in English. He then went on to attend the University of Michigan Law School where he graduated magna cum laude and Order of the Coif with a J.D. in 1997 and worked as notes editor of the Michigan Law Review. He clerked for Judge Stephen Reinhardt of the U.S. Court of Appeals for the Ninth Circuit during the 1997–1998 term and for Supreme Court Justice John Paul Stevens during the 1998–1999 term.

He was an associate and then partner at Davis Wright Tremaine in Seattle from 1999 to 2006. In 2006, he became an associate professor of law at Stanford Law School. He was awarded the 2008 Robert C. Heeney Memorial Award from the National Association of Criminal Defense Lawyers. In 2012, he was promoted to full professor of law.

He was lead counsel for the plaintiffs in Bishop v. Oklahoma.

== Supreme Court cases argued ==
- TikTok v. Garland (2025)
- Erlinger v. United States (2024)
- Diaz v. United States (2024)
- Dubin v. United States (2023)
- Hemphill v. New York (2021)
- Ramos v. Louisiana (2020)
- Jam v. International Finance Corp. (2019)
- United States v. Stitt (2018)
- Mount Lemon Fire District v. Guido (2018)
- Koons v. United States (2018)
- Currier v. Virginia (2018)
- Jesner v. Arab Bank, PLC (2018)
- Microsoft Corp. v. Baker (2017)
- Esquivel-Quintana v. Sessions (2017)
- Endrew F. v. Douglas County School District (2017)
- Peña-Rodriguez v. Colorado (2017)
- OBB Personenverkehr AG v. Sachs (2015)
- Ohio v. Clark (2015)
- Oneok v. Learjet (2015)
- T-Mobile South, LLC v. City of Roswell (2015)
- Heien v. North Carolina (2014)
- Riley v. California (2014)
- Fernandez v. California (2014)
- Salinas v. Texas (2013)
- Decker v. Northwest Environmental Defense Center (2013)
- Chaidez v. United States (2013)
- Lozman v. Riviera Beach (2013)
- Mohamad v. Palestinian Authority (2012)
- Greene v. Fisher (2011)
- Bullcoming v. New Mexico (2011)
- United States v. Tinklenberg (2011)
- Magwood v. Patterson (2010)
- United States v. O'Brien (2010)
- Melendez-Diaz v. Massachusetts (2009)
- Waddington v. Saurusad (2009)
- Kennedy v. Louisiana (2008)
- Burgess v. United States (2008)
- Exxon Shipping Co. v. Baker (2008)
- Burton v. Waddington (2007)
- Global Crossing v. Metrophones (2007)
- United States v. Gonzalez-Lopez (2006)
- Davis v. Washington (2006)
- Blakely v. Washington (2004)
- Crawford v. Washington (2004)

== Personal life ==
He has two daughters, Eleanor and Charlotte.

== Writing ==
- Jeffrey L. Fisher, "A Clinic's Place in the Supreme Court Bar", Stanford Law Review, January 2013

== See also ==
- List of law clerks for the fourth seat of the Supreme Court of the United States

== Sources ==
- The AALS Directory of Law Teachers 2006–2007.
