= Dying declaration =

Type of legal testimony

In the law of evidence, a dying declaration is testimony that would normally be barred as hearsay, but may in common law nonetheless be admitted as evidence in criminal law trials because it constituted the last words of a dying person. The rationale is that someone who is dying or believes death to be imminent would have less incentive to fabricate testimony, and as such, the hearsay statement carries with it some reliability.

== History ==
In medieval English courts, the principle originated of Nemo moriturus praesumitur mentiri — "no-one on the point of death is presumed to be lying". An incident in which a dying declaration was admitted as evidence has been found in the 1202 case of Geoffrey v Goddard.

== Tests for admissibility ==
In common law, a "dying declaration" must be a statement made by a deceased person who would otherwise have been a credible witness to their own death by murder or manslaughter, and was of "settled hopeless expectation of death".

== England and Wales ==
The admissibility of hearsay evidence in criminal proceedings has been governed by the Criminal Justice Act 2003 which effectively replaced the common law regime and abolished all common law hearsay exceptions (except those preserved by s.118) including the dying declaration exception. An original statement made by a dead person may now be admissible under the statutory "unavailability" exception (ss.114 & 116) subject to the courts' judicial discretion (preserved by s.126) to exclude unreliable evidence (i.e. the prejudicial value outweighs the probative value).

== United States ==
Under the Federal Rules of Evidence, a dying declaration is admissible if the proponent of the statement can establish all of the following:

- The declarant's statement is being offered in a criminal prosecution for homicide, or in a civil action. Some states also permit the admission of dying declarations in other types of cases.
- The declarant is unavailable – this can be established using FRE 804(a)(4).
- The declarant's statement was made while under the genuine belief that their death was imminent. The declarant does not have to actually die.
- The declarant's statement relates to the cause or circumstances of what they believed to be their impending death.

Other general rules of admissibility also apply, such as the requirement that the declaration must be based on the declarant's actual knowledge.

The statement must relate to the circumstances or the cause of the declarant's own impending death. In 1933, the Supreme Court unanimously determined in Shepard v. United States that the declarant must believe that death in a certainty.. The legal history of this case evidenced that Major Shepard, an army doctor, and his wife had a "testy" relationship but there was some question as to whether she was suicidal or even believed that her death was certain. In the dying declaration of Clifton Chambers in 1988, he stated that ten years earlier, he had helped his son bury a man whom the son had killed by accident. The statement was sufficient cause to justify a warrant for a search on the son's property, and the man's body was indeed found. However, there was no physical evidence of a crime, and since Chambers was not the victim, his dying declaration was not admissible as evidence, and the son was never brought to trial.

The first use of the dying declaration exception in American law was in the 1770 murder trial of the British soldiers responsible for the Boston Massacre. One of the victims, Patrick Carr, told his doctor before he died that the soldiers had been provoked. The doctor's testimony helped defense attorney John Adams to secure acquittals for some of the defendants and reduced charges for the rest.

If the defendant is convicted of homicide but the reliability of the dying declaration is in question, there is grounds for an appeal.

The future of the dying declaration doctrine in light of Supreme Court opinions such as Crawford v. Washington (2004) is unclear (Crawford was decided under the constitution's Confrontation Clause, not the common law). Opinions such as Giles v. California (2008) discuss the matter (although the statements in Giles were not a dying declaration), but Justice Ginsburg notes in her dissent to Michigan v. Bryant (2011) that the court has not addressed whether the dying declaration exception is valid after the confrontation clause cases.

=== Criticism ===
Since the nineteenth century, critics have questioned the credibility of dying declarations. In a state court case, the Wisconsin Supreme Court considered the issue of a dying declaration. The defense pointed out that "this kind of evidence is not regarded with favor." The defense argued that several factors could undermine the reliability of dying declarations:

Physical or mental weakness consequent upon the approach of death, a desire of self-vindication, or a disposition to impute the responsibility for a wrong to another, as well as the fact that the declarations are made in the absence of the accused, and often in response to leading questions and direct suggestions, and with no opportunity for cross-examination: all these considerations conspire to render such declarations a dangerous kind of evidence.

== India ==
Dying declarations are allowed as evidence in Indian courts if the dying person is conscious of their danger, they have given up hopes of recovery, the death of the dying person is the subject of the charge and of the dying declaration, and if the dying person was capable of a religious sense of accountability to their Maker.

== See also ==
- Deathbed confession
- Last words
