= California v. Green =

- Supreme Court of the United States

Argued April 20, 1970 Decided June 23, 1970
- Full case name: State of California, Petitioner v. John Anthony Green
- Docket no.: 387
- Citations: 399 U.S. 149 (more) 90 S. Ct. 1930; 26 L. Ed. 2d 489

Case history
- Prior: People v. Green, 70 Cal. 2d 654, 451 P.2d 422 (1969); cert. granted, 396 U.S. 1001 (1970)

Holding
- The Confrontation Clause does not bar admissibility of prior inconsistent statements where the witness testifies at trial and is subject to full cross-examination, or admission of prior testimony given by that witness at a preliminary hearing where the defendant had an adequate opportunity for cross-examination.

Court membership
- Chief Justice Warren E. Burger Associate Justices Hugo Black · William O. Douglas; John M. Harlan II · William J. Brennan Jr. Potter Stewart · Byron White; Thurgood Marshall · Harry Blackmun

Case opinions
- Majority: White, joined by Black, Douglas, Stewart, Burger
- Dissent: Brennan
- Justices Marshall and Blackmun took no part in the consideration or decision of the case.

Laws applied
- U.S. Const. amend. VI; U.S. Const. amend. XIV; Cal. Evid. Code § 1235

California v. Green, 399 U.S. 149 (1970), was a United States Supreme Court case decided in 1970 concerning the Confrontation Clause of the Sixth Amendment. The Court held that the Confrontation Clause does not bar admissibility of prior inconsistent statements where the witness testifies at trial and is subject to full cross-examination, or admission of prior testimony given by that witness at a preliminary hearing where the defendant had an adequate opportunity for cross-examination. The case largely concerned the relationship between the Confrontation Clause and the hearsay rule.

== Background ==
California Evidence Code § 1235, effective as of 1967, permitted a prior inconsistent statement from a hearing to be admitted at trial, notwithstanding the hearsay rule, subject to other requirements of California evidence law. The provision departed from the traditional rule, under which a prior inconsistent statement could generally be introduced to impeach witness credibility, but not as substantive evidence proving the truth of what the witness had previously said. The California rule reflected the alternative view of a number of evidence scholars that the principal concerns underlying the hearsay rule are reduced where the declarant appears at trial, and is able to be cross-examined.

== Facts and procedural history ==
In January 1967, Melvin Porter, then a 16-year-old minor, was arrested for selling marijuana to an undercover police officer. Four days after his arrest, while in the custody of juvenile authorities, Porter named respondent John Anthony Green as his supplier. As recounted later by Los Angeles police officer Barry Wade, Porter claimed that John Anthony Green, a 24-year-old acquaintance, had called him earlier that month, had asked him to sell some "stuff" or "grass," and had that same afternoon personally delivered a shopping bag containing 29 "baggies" of marijuana. Porter said that he was permitted to keep one bag and was to sell the remainder. It was from this supply that Porter had made his sale to the undercover officer. A week later, Porter testified at Green's preliminary hearing, and again named Green as his supplier, although he now claimed that, instead of personally delivering the marijuana, Green had showed him where to pick up the shopping bag, hidden in the bushes at Green's parents' house. Porter's testimony at the preliminary hearing was subjected to extensive cross-examination by Green's counsel. At the conclusion of the hearing, Green was charged with furnishing marijuana to a minor in violation of California law.

Two months later, Green was tried in a bench trial, conducted before a judge without a jury. Porter again appeared as the prosecution's principal witness. This time, however, Porter was "markedly evasive and uncooperative". While acknowledging that Green had telephoned him, and that he had subsequently obtained 29 bags of marijuana, Porter changed his story, claiming that he had taken acid twenty minutes before meeting Green and could not distinguish fact from fantasy. During Porter's testimony, the prosecutor read portions of his preliminary-hearing testimony, which were admitted under § 1235, and were used not merely to impeach Porter, but as substantive evidence of the events they described. Porter testified that the transcript refreshed his memory of what he had said at the preliminary hearing, but on cross-examination maintained that he did not independently remember the underlying events. Officer Wade subsequently testified as to Porter's earlier statement that Green had personally delivered the marijuana, which statement was likewise admitted as substantive evidence. Green, in his testimony, denied supplying Porter with marijuana.

The trial court convicted Green. The California District Court of Appeal reversed, and the Supreme Court of California affirmed the reversal, holding that the substantive use of Porter's prior inconsistent statements violated the federal Confrontation Clause. The state supreme court concluded that cross-examination at the preliminary hearing was not an adequate substitute for contemporaneous cross-examination before the ultimate trier of fact. The United States Supreme Court granted certiorari.

== Opinion of the court ==
The Court, in an opinion delivered by Justice Byron White, vacated the judgment of the California Supreme Court and remanded the case for further proceedings.

With respect to prior inconsistent statements, the Court rejected the proposition that the Confrontation Clause constitutionalized the common-law hearsay rule and its exceptions. Although hearsay doctrine and the right of confrontation protected similar interests, White reasoned that the two were not completely congruent, as evidence might violate a hearsay rule without necessarily violating the Constitution, and evidence falling within a recognized hearsay exception could still present a confrontation problem. The Court therefore held that when a declarant appears at trial and is subject to full and effective cross-examination, admission of the earlier inconsistent statements does not itself violate the Confrontation Clause. The witness can be questioned, under oath, about both the current testimony and the prior statement, and the trier of fact can observe the witness while the witness admits, denies, or otherwise explains the earlier account.

The Court separately concluded that Porter's preliminary-hearing testimony could constitutionally be used as substantive evidence, Porter having testified under oath, Green having been represented by counsel, and Green's counsel having extensively cross-examined Porter. The Court reasoned that such an opportunity for cross-examination substantially served the purposes of the Confrontation Clause, noting that prior testimony obtained under comparable circumstances could be admitted if a witness later became unavailable. That Porter actually appeared at the subsequent trial did not require a different result, as it would be an anomaly to permit introduction of his preliminary-hearing testimony if he were unavailable, while prohibiting its use where the state had produced him at trial, thereby making him available for further cross-examination.

The Court chose not to resolve the separate question presented by Porter's statement to Officer Wade. Porter having professed an inability at trial to remember the underlying events, the Court left it to the California courts the initial determination whether Porters claimed memory loss had so impaired Green's ability to cross-examine him that admission of Wade's account presented a different constitutional problem.

On remand from the Supreme Court, the Supreme Court of California addressed Porter's asserted loss of memory and concluded that admission of Officer Wade's testimony on Porter's earlier statement did not violate the Confrontation Clause. The Supreme Court later reaffirmed the central holding of Green in Crawford v. Washington (2004), stating that where a declarant appears for cross-examination at trial, the Confrontation Clause does not restrict the use of the declarant's prior testimonial statements. The implications of the case for a witness claiming to have had a loss of memory were examined by legal scholar Michael H. Graham in a 1978 Texas Law Review article.

== Dissent ==
Justice William J. Brennan Jr., dissenting, argued that neither Porter's statement to Officer Wade nor his preliminary-hearing testimony should have been admitted as substantive evidence. Because Porter had claimed at trial that he could not remember the relevant events, Brennan reasoned that Green could not meaningfully cross-examine him concerning the substance of his earlier accounts. Brennan further contended that cross-examination at a preliminary hearing could not substitute for confrontation at trial because the two proceedings served different purposes. The purpose of the preliminary hearing was to determine probable cause, rather than guilt, and defense counsel therefore had both less reason and less opportunity to conduct the kind of searching cross-examination that would be appropriate at trial.
