= Melendez-Diaz v. Massachusetts =

- Supreme Court of the United States

Argued November 10, 2008 Decided June 25, 2009
- Full case name: Luis E. Melendez-Diaz v. Massachusetts
- Docket no.: 07-591
- Citations: 557 U.S. 305 (more) 129 S.Ct. 2527; 174 L. Ed. 2d 314; 2009 U.S. LEXIS 4734

Case history
- Prior: guilty; appeal rejected, 69 Mass. App. Ct. 1114, 870 N.E.2d 676 (2007)(unpublished); denying review, 449 Mass. 1113, 874 N.E.2d 407 (2007).

Holding
- Sworn affidavits are testimonial in nature, violate the Confrontation Clause under Crawford v. Washington (2004), and do not meet the business records exception to the hearsay rule. The requirements of the Confrontation Clause may not be relaxed because they make the prosecution's task burdensome. "Notice and demand" statutes are constitutional.

Court membership
- Chief Justice John Roberts Associate Justices John P. Stevens · Antonin Scalia; Anthony Kennedy · David Souter; Clarence Thomas · Ruth Bader Ginsburg; Stephen Breyer · Samuel Alito

Case opinions
- Majority: Scalia, joined by Stevens, Souter, Thomas, Ginsburg
- Concurrence: Thomas
- Dissent: Kennedy, joined by Roberts, Breyer, Alito

Laws applied
- U.S. Const. amend. VI; Fed. R. Evid. 803(6)

Melendez-Diaz v. Massachusetts, 557 U.S. 305 (2009), is a United States Supreme Court case in which the Court held that it was a violation of the Sixth Amendment right of confrontation for a prosecutor to submit a chemical drug test report without the testimony of the person who performed the test. While the court ruled that the then-common practice of submitting these reports without testimony was unconstitutional, it also held that so called "notice-and-demand" statutes are constitutional. A state would not violate the Constitution through a "notice-and-demand" statute by both putting the defendant on notice that the prosecution would submit a chemical drug test report without the testimony of the scientist and also giving the defendant sufficient time to raise an objection.

== Background ==
In 2001, Boston police received information from an informant regarding suspicious activity at a Kmart store. The informant stated that an employee repeatedly received phone calls at work, after which he would leave the store, get into a blue sedan, and return a few minutes later. Police set up surveillance and witnessed this activity occur. Police detained and searched the employee finding four clear plastic bags containing a white powder substance, alleged to be cocaine. Police detained and searched the passengers of the blue sedan including Luis Melendez-Diaz, then transported them to police headquarters in a police car. During the trip, police observed the arrestees fidgeting and making furtive movements. Upon arrival at the station, police searched the interior of the police car and found 19 smaller plastic bags containing a white powder, again alleged to be cocaine. In accordance with Massachusetts law, police submitted all alleged contraband for chemical testing. Melendez-Diaz was charged with distribution and drug trafficking of cocaine in an amount between 14 and 28 grams under the Massachusetts Controlled Substances Act, a felony punishable by not less than three years imprisonment.

At trial, the prosecution placed into evidence the bags seized from the police car. It also submitted three "certificates of analysis" or affidavits showing the results of the forensic analysis performed on samples of the seized white powder. The affidavits reported the weight of the seized bags and claimed the substance found was cocaine. The affidavits were sworn before a notary public in accordance with Massachusetts law. Melendez-Diaz objected to their admission asserting that the Supreme Court decision in Crawford v. Washington required the forensic analyst to testify in person. The trial court overruled the objection and admitted the affidavits as prima facie evidence of the positive presence of narcotics.

A jury trial found Melendez-Diaz guilty. He appealed, contending inter alia that the admission of the affidavits violated his Sixth Amendment right to be confronted by those witnesses who would testify against him. The Massachusetts Appeals Court rejected the claim under Massachusetts precedent which held that admission of these affidavits did not violate the Confrontation clause. The Supreme Judicial Court of Massachusetts denied review.

Melendez-Diaz then appealed to the U.S. Supreme Court, which granted certiorari.

== Oral arguments ==
The case was argued by Jeffrey L. Fisher on behalf of Melendez-Diaz and Martha Coakley on behalf of Massachusetts. Both attorneys focused their attention on Justice Kennedy, the 'swing-vote' on the Court, in their arguments.

== Opinion of the Court ==
Justice Scalia delivered the opinion of the Court in which Justices Stevens, Souter, Thomas, and Ginsburg joined. Justice Thomas filed a concurring opinion. Justice Kennedy filed a dissenting opinion, in which Chief Justice Roberts, Justice Breyer and Justice Alito joined.

The Court emphasized that its ruling was a continuation but little more than an application of its holding in Crawford v. Washington (2004).

=== Affidavits ===
The Court held that the certificates constituted testimonial evidence i.e. they were prepared for the purpose of a later criminal trial. Citing Crawford v. Washington, a witness's testimony is inadmissible unless he or she appears at trial, or if unavailable, the court afforded the defendant the opportunity to cross examine the witness. The court reiterated the non-exclusive class of statements which are testimonial in nature:

Various formulations of this core class of testimonial statements exist: ex parte in-court testimony or its functional equivalent that is, material such as affidavits, custodial examinations, prior testimony that the defendant was unable to cross-examine, or similar pretrial statements that declarants would reasonably expect to be used prosecutorially. 541 U. S. 36, 51–52 (emphasis added)

The Court found that the forensic analyst who tested the contraband substance and reported that it was cocaine was a witness for purposes of the Confrontation Clause. Because the trial court did not give Melendez-Diaz the opportunity to cross-examine the analyst, his right of Confrontation was violated.

=== Chemical test affidavits ===
The Court rejected Massachusetts' argument that the analyst's reports were not accusatory. The respondent had argued that the reports were not accusatory because they did not implicate the defendant in a crime alone, but only when taken together with other evidence which linked the defendant to the contraband. The Court rejected this argument noting that the reports proved an essential element of the crime. The Court cited United States v. Kirby (1899). In Kirby, the Defendant was charged with receiving stolen property. The evidence at issue proved only that the property was stolen, but not the other essential element of the crime, that Kirby had received it. The Court noted that the Kirby decision was part of a long established rule that evidence that proves only one essential element of a crime is nevertheless accusatory for purposes of the Confrontation Clause.

=== Scientific analysts ===
The Court noted that the Confrontation Clause creates two kinds of witnesses: those whom the prosecution is obligated to call, and those whom the defense has the discretion to call. The Court rejected the argument that the analyst was not a conventional witness because he or she recorded the immediate results of a chemical test rather than recalled a historical event. Even though evidence may be so contemporaneous that it meets the present sense impression exception to the hearsay rule, it may nevertheless be a violation of the Confrontation Clause. The Court referred to the companion case to Davis v. Washington, where it ruled that statements to police immediately after an incident of domestic violence were "non-testimonial" and part of "an on-going emergency" and therefore admissible.

=== Scientific evidence ===
The Court rejected the argument that the neutral and especially reliable nature of the forensic chemical testing would exclude it from the confrontation requirement. This would have been a return to the reasoning of the overruled decision in Ohio v. Roberts. Roberts had held that certain out of court testimony that had "particularized guarantees of trustworthiness" would not violate the Confrontation Clause. Additionally, the Court noted that "Forensic evidence is not uniquely immune from the risk of manipulation." It cited a study of forensic laboratories where analysts would falsely record results of tests never performed because of the high volume demands of law enforcement. The Court held that an opportunity for confrontation would give the forensic witness the opportunity to recant a previously falsified report. The court cited one particular study in which invalid forensic testimony contributed to a false conviction in 60% of the cases where defendants had achieved exoneration.

=== Forensic affidavits ===
The Court rejected Massachusetts' claim that the forensic affidavits met the business records exception to the hearsay rule. A business document will be inadmissible under the exception when "calculated for use essentially in the court, not in the business." The Court analyzed the narrow exception of a clerk certificate authenticating official records. This certificate was limited in that it could only claim the authenticity of the record as official, but speak nothing of its contents. The Court drew a distinction between this exception and the case before it. The forensic analyst was creating a record whereas the clerk was authenticating a record already in existence. Finally, it explained the relationship between the Confrontation Clause and the Business Records Exception. Citing Crawford, the court stated that most business records will escape Sixth Amendment scrutiny not because they meet the exception to the hearsay rule, but because they are non-testimonial in nature. A record prepared in the ordinary course of business will necessarily not have been created for the purpose of proving a fact at trial.

=== Confrontation Clause ===
The Court drew a distinction between the Compulsory Process Clause and the Confrontation Clause. Even though Melendez-Diaz had the opportunity to call the forensic analyst as a witness at his option, this was no substitute for the protections of the right of confrontation. This would shift the burden of producing adverse witnesses on the defendant rather than on the prosecution. The Court agreed with the scenario proposed by the petitioner: that the prosecution would present affidavits to the judge ex parte and wait for the defense to subpoena whom he chose.

Finally, the Court addressed the argument proposed by the Massachusetts and the amici that a finding for the petitioner would place a substantial burden on the courts. The Court reassured respondents that "the sky [would] not fall." It noted that several states had already passed Constitutional statutes that satisfied the requirements of the Confrontation Clause. Specifically, the Court held that the so-called "notice-and-demand" statutes require the prosecution to provide notice to the defendant of its intent to use an analyst’s report as evidence at trial, after which the defendant is given a period of time in which he may object to the admission of the evidence absent the analyst’s appearance live at trial" and that these would be Constitutional. These statutes are not a burden shift, but merely require the defense to invoke an objection prior to trial. Notice-and-demand statutes are procedural and merely regulate the timing of objections. The Court also took note of usual practice of defense attorneys to stipulate to the results of drug analyses as a matter of trial strategy (e.g. not wishing to draw attention to the certainty of the results or draw the ire of the judge). It reasoned that the practice would continue and the burdens predicted by the dissent and amici for respondent would not materialize. The Court stressed that the requirements of the Confrontation Clause are "binding" and not to be disregarded.

== See also ==
- Hearsay
- Hearsay in United States law
- Business records exception
- Forensic toxicology
- List of United States Supreme Court cases, volume 557
- List of United States Supreme Court cases
