= Ohio v. Roberts =

- Supreme Court of the United States

Argued November 26, 1979 Decided June 25, 1980
- Full case name: Ohio v. Hershel Roberts
- Citations: 448 U.S. 56 (more) 100 S. Ct. 2531; 65 L. Ed. 2d 597; 1980 U.S. LEXIS 140

Holding
- Under the confrontation clause, statements of a witness unavailable at trial may be admitted only if the hearsay bears adequate indicia of reliability.

Court membership
- Chief Justice Warren E. Burger Associate Justices William J. Brennan Jr. · Potter Stewart; Byron White · Thurgood Marshall; Harry Blackmun · Lewis F. Powell Jr. William Rehnquist · John P. Stevens

Case opinions
- Majority: Blackmun, joined by Burger, Stewart, White, Powell, Rehnquist
- Dissent: Brennan, joined by Marshall, Stevens

Laws applied
- U.S. Const. amends. VI, XIV
- Overruled by
- Crawford v. Washington (2004)

Ohio v. Roberts, 448 U.S. 56 (1980), is a United States Supreme Court decision dealing with the Confrontation Clause of the Sixth Amendment to the United States Constitution.

== Factual background ==
Herschel Roberts was charged with forgery of a check and with possession of stolen credit cards. At the preliminary hearing, defense counsel called the victims' daughter to the stand and tried to elicit from her an admission that she provided the defendant with the checks and the credit card but failed to inform the defendant that she did not have permission to use them. Counsel was unable to elicit this admission nor did the prosecutor cross-examine the witness.

The daughter was subpoenaed five times but never appeared for trial. At trial, the defendant testified that the daughter had given him her parents' checkbook and credit cards with the understanding he could use them. The State, on rebuttal, offered the transcript of the daughter's testimony pursuant to Ohio Rev. Code Ann. Section 2945.49 (1975) which permits the use of preliminary examination testimony of a witness who “cannot for any reason be produced at trial.” The defense objected asserting that use of the transcript violated the Confrontation Clause of the Sixth Amendment to the United States Constitution (incorporated to the States under the Fourteenth Amendment to the United States Constitution). The trial court admitted the transcript and the defendant was convicted. The Supreme Court of Ohio overturned the conviction. That court held that the daughter's absence at trial and the lack of cross-examination at the preliminary hearing violated the Confrontation Clause.

== Opinion of the Court ==
The Supreme Court held that the daughter's statement did not violate the Confrontation Clause. They reasoned that out-of-court statements can be admissible if they bear adequate “indicia of reliability,” even if the declarant is not available to testify in court. They found that one could infer reliability in cases where the evidences falls “within a firmly rooted hearsay exception,” but even in other cases, if “particularized guarantees of trustworthiness” can be shown, the evidence would be admitted.

== Subsequent history ==
Ohio v. Roberts is no longer controlling authority. The Supreme Court later ruled, in Crawford v. Washington, that because the Sixth Amendment to the United States Constitution specifies the right to confrontation, an “indicia of reliability” was not an adequate substitute for cross-examination. But the Court's recent decision in Michigan v. Bryant may signal a "resurrection" of Roberts, as the Court based its decision on reliability of the out-of-court statement, rather than on the Defendant's opportunity to confront the witness bearing testimony against him.

== See also ==
- California v. Green, 399 U.S. 149 (1970), established the concept of the indicia of reliability.
- Mancusi v. Stubbs, 408 U.S. 204 (1972)
- Crawford v. Washington, 541 U.S. 36 (2004), a later case which reiterated some and rejected other findings of the Court.
