= Federal Bureau of Investigation v. Fazaga =

- Supreme Court of the United States

Argued November 8, 2021 Decided March 4, 2022
- Full case name: Federal Bureau of Investigation, et al. v. Yassir Fazaga, et al.
- Docket no.: 20-828
- Citations: 595 U.S. 344 (more)
- Argument: Oral argument

Holding
- The Foreign Intelligence Surveillance Act of 1978 does not override or alter the state secrets doctrine.

Court membership
- Chief Justice John Roberts Associate Justices Clarence Thomas · Stephen Breyer; Samuel Alito · Sonia Sotomayor; Elena Kagan · Neil Gorsuch; Brett Kavanaugh · Amy Coney Barrett

Case opinion
- Majority: Alito, joined by unanimous

Laws applied
- Foreign Intelligence Surveillance Act of 1978

Federal Bureau of Investigation v. Fazaga, 595 U.S. 344 (2022), was a United States Supreme Court case dealing with the use of law enforcement surveillance under the Foreign Intelligence Surveillance Act of 1978 (FISA) and the state secrets privilege defense. The case stems from a 2011 class action lawsuit filed against the Federal Bureau of Investigation (FBI) related to one of its surveillance operations. In August 2012, the district court dismissed the case on the basis of the FBI's invocation of state secrets privilege. The Ninth Circuit overturned this ruling in part in 2019, ruling that FISA precluded the defendants from invoking the state secrets defense. However, the Supreme Court overturned the Ninth Circuit’s ruling in a unanimous decision in March 2022, stating that FISA does not override the state secrets defense.

== Background ==
In 2006, the FBI and the Orange County, California Joint Terrorism Task Force ran Operation Flex, a counterterrorism operation, by recruiting a fitness instructor, Craig Monteilh, to become an informant. Monteilh, under an assumed name, pretended to convert to Islam and joined the Islamic Center of Irvine (ICOI) in Irvine, California. In addition to his own gathering of information, Monteilh wore and planted recording devices throughout the mosque and in homes and businesses of ICOI members that Monteilh came to know personally, passing on the information to the FBI. After about a year, Monteilh began making statements about taking violent action while in the presence of ICOI. He was reported to the police and put under a restraining order from ICOI. The FBI lost confidence in Monteilh and ended the operation.

Monteilh was convicted of grand theft in connection with the distribution of steroids in a separate matter in 2008, and ended up in California state prison. In April 2008, he was stabbed repeatedly in prison after being labelled a snitch. Monteilh filed a lawsuit against the FBI, stating that they failed to protect him after using him for their investigation, and made numerous details of Operation Flex public in 2009 prior to filing his suit against the FBI in 2010. Monteilh also spoke to these details of Operation Flex in a 2009 case the FBI brought against Ahmad Niazi, an Afghan immigrant that Monteilh had attempted to blackmail to become an FBI informant, though charges against Niazi were eventually dropped.

== Lower courts ==
Three members of ICOI, using Monteilh's information, filed a lawsuit in the U.S. District Court for the Central District of California in 2011 against the United States, the FBI, and several FBI agents involved in Operation Flex. The plaintiffs alleged that they were subject to unconstitutional law enforcement surveillance under eleven causes of action, including FISA, First, Fourth, and Fifth Amendment rights, and other laws related to the use of mass surveillance and religious profiling. They also sought class certification. The American Civil Liberties Union was the lead counsel for the plaintiffs; the Council on American-Islamic Relations was also involved. Monteilh also provided more information on his role as an informant to the plaintiffs.

Eric Holder, the Attorney General at the time (under the Obama administration), helped defend the FBI's actions leading up to Fazaga. The government moved to dismiss the case, invoking the state secret privilege of FISA and arguing that further litigation of the case would risk national security. U.S. District Judge Cormac J. Carney agreed, stating that the FBI could not defend itself without "relying on privileged material", and in August 2012, dismissed the class-action suit. Judge Carney did allow FISA-related portions of the suit against the specific FBI agents to continue.

The plaintiffs appealed to the U.S. Court of Appeals for the Ninth Circuit. In 2019, the Ninth Circuit affirmed the district court's ruling in part and reversed in part. The Ninth Circuit found that the District Court erred in application of FISA's state secret privilege outlined in Section 1806(f), as the conditions of the three members of ICOI met the requirements of Section 1806(f): that they were an "aggrieved person" that had sought to "discover or obtain" the information the FBI had obtained on them. Along with other reversals of the District Court's dismissal, the Ninth Circuit decision allowed the class-action suit to proceed. The Ninth Circuit denied to rehear the case en banc in July 2020.

== Supreme Court ==
The FBI filed a petition for a writ of certiorari that asked the Supreme Court to review the Ninth Circuit's ruling and resolve the question regarding FISA Section 1806(f). The FBI stated that the specific FISA section only applied when the case dealt with charging a specific individual, and did not apply to a general challenge to their surveillance methods. The Supreme Court granted certiorari in June 2021, agreeing to hear the case during its 2021–22 term.

The Court ruled unanimously on March 4, 2022, reversing the Ninth Circuit and remanding the case. The opinion, written by Justice Samuel Alito, stated that Section 1806(f) of FISA does not override the state secrets privilege, as was ruled by the Ninth Circuit.

== Impact ==
In a 2013 book on transparency in legal contexts, Bianchi noted that although public opinion supports government transparency (even when it involves security-sensitive governmental law enforcement), there are "dark sides of transparency". In an opinion piece in 2014 for Al Jazeera, assistant professor of history Abdullah Al-Arian at Georgetown University criticized the use of informants in Fazaga.
