= Diaz v. United States =

- Supreme Court of the United States

Argued March 19, 2024 Decided June 20, 2024
- Full case name: Delilah Guadalupe Diaz v. United States
- Docket no.: 23-14
- Argument: Oral argument

Case history
- Prior: United States v. Diaz (9th Cir. 2023). United States v. Diaz (S.D. Cal. 2020).

Questions presented
- In a prosecution for drug trafficking-where an element of the offense is that the defendant knew she was carrying illegal drugs, does Rule 704(b) permit a governmental expert witness to testify that most couriers know they are carrying drugs and that drug-trafficking organizations do not entrust large quantities of drugs to unknowing transporters?

Holding
- Expert testimony that "most people" in a group have a particular mental state is not an opinion about "the defendant" and thus does not violate Rule 704(b).

Court membership
- Chief Justice John Roberts Associate Justices Clarence Thomas · Samuel Alito; Sonia Sotomayor · Elena Kagan; Neil Gorsuch · Brett Kavanaugh; Amy Coney Barrett · Ketanji Brown Jackson

Case opinions
- Majority: Thomas, joined by Roberts, Alito, Kavanaugh, Barrett, Jackson
- Concurrence: Jackson
- Dissent: Gorsuch, joined by Sotomayor, Kagan

Laws applied
- Federal Rule of Evidence 704(b)

Diaz v. United States, 602 U.S. 526 (2024), is a United States Supreme Court case. The court interpreted a provision of the Federal Rules of Evidence regarding the admissibility of expert witness testimony.

== Background ==
In August 2020, Delilah Guadalupe Diaz was returning home to California from a trip to Mexico. At a border checkpoint, a border agent asked Diaz to roll her car window down. Upon her doing so, the border agent heard a "crunch-like sound". The agent then called for backup and used a "buster" device to measure the density of the car's door panels; this device uses low-level radiation to scan vehicles for contraband. Upon further inspection, agents found nearly 28 kilograms of methamphetamine hidden in the car's door panels.

Diaz told officers that she was unaware of the presence of the drugs. Diaz said that she had driven to Mexico with her daughter using her own car. The daughter left early while Diaz remained in Mexico with her boyfriend, Jessie. Jessie let Diaz return to the United States with his car, saying he would pick it up in a few days.

== Lower court history ==
Diaz was charged in the United States District Court for the Southern District of California with importation of methamphetamine, contrary to the Controlled Substances Act. One of the elements of the offense is that the defendant "knowingly" transported drugs into the United States. Diaz insisted that this element of the crime was not satisfied. Before trial, Diaz moved to exclude any testimony concerning the knowledge of typical drug couriers, arguing that permitting such evidence would violate Federal Rule of Evidence 704(b), which states:

In a criminal case, an expert witness must not state an opinion about whether the defendant did or did not have a mental state or condition that constitutes an element of the crime charged or of a defense. Those matters are for the trier of fact alone.

Over this objection, the District Court ruled that it would permit such testimony. At trial, the prosecution called Andrew Flood, a Homeland Security agent, as an expert on drug-trafficking organizations. Flood's testimony included the following exchange:

Q. Agent Flood, based on your training and experience, are large quantities of drugs entrusted to drivers that are unaware of those drugs?

[Counsel for Diaz]: Objection. 401, 403.
THE COURT: Overruled.

THE WITNESS: No. In extreme circumstances – actually, in most circumstances, the driver knows they are hired. It’s a business. They are hired to take the drugs from point A to point B.

Q. And why aren’t – why don’t they use unknowing couriers, generally?

[Counsel for Diaz]: Objection. 401, 403.
THE COURT: Overruled. You may answer.

THE WITNESS: Generally, it’s a risk of your – your cargo not making it to the new market; not knowing where it’s going; not being able to retrieve it at the ending point, at your point B. So there’s a risk of not delivering your product and, therefore, you’re not going to make any money.

Diaz was convicted and sentenced to seven years in prison. On appeal to the United States Court of Appeals for the Ninth Circuit, the Court rejected petitioner's argument that Agent Flood's testimony violated rule 704(b). The Court ruled that Flood's statements did not constitute an "explicit opinion" on the defendant's state of mind. The Court did, however, acknowledge a circuit split on this question, citing a case from the Fifth Circuit where that court found that such statements are the "functional equivalent" of a prohibited opinion on mental state. Despite this, the Ninth Circuit, bound by its precedent, upheld Diaz's conviction on January 19, 2023. On March 3, the Ninth Circuit denied Diaz's petition for rehearing en banc.

== Supreme Court ==
On June 30, 2023, Diaz petitioned the Supreme Court to hear her case. On November 13, the Court granted certiorari. Oral arguments were heard on March 19, 2024. The case was argued, on behalf of Diaz, by Jeffrey L. Fisher and, on behalf of the United States, by Matthew Guarnieri.

On June 20, 2024, the court ruled 6-3 that the expert testimony of "most people" is not an opinion on the "defendant" and is admissible under the Federal Rules of Evidence.
