= Hughes v. Northwestern University =

- Supreme Court of the United States

Decided January 24, 2022
- Full case name: Hughes v. Northwestern University
- Docket no.: 19-1401
- Citations: 595 U.S. 170 (more)

Holding
- The Seventh Circuit erred in relying on the participants' ultimate choice over their investments to excuse allegedly imprudent decisions by respondents. Determining whether petitioners state plausible claims against plan fiduciaries for violations of ERISA's duty of prudence requires a context-specific inquiry of the fiduciaries’ continuing duty to monitor investments and to remove imprudent ones.

Court membership
- Chief Justice John Roberts Associate Justices Clarence Thomas · Stephen Breyer; Samuel Alito · Sonia Sotomayor; Elena Kagan · Neil Gorsuch; Brett Kavanaugh · Amy Coney Barrett

Case opinion
- Majority: Sotomayor, joined by unanimous
- Barrett took no part in the consideration or decision of the case.

Laws applied
- Employee Retirement Income Security Act of 1974

Hughes v. Northwestern University, 595 U.S. 170 (2022), was a United States Supreme Court case in which the Court held that the Seventh Circuit erred in relying on the participants' ultimate choice over their investments to excuse allegedly imprudent decisions by respondents. Determining whether petitioners state plausible claims against plan fiduciaries for violations of the Employee Retirement Income Security Act of 1974's duty of prudence requires a context-specific inquiry of the fiduciaries’ continuing duty to monitor investments and to remove imprudent ones.
