= Nijhawan v. Holder =

- Supreme Court of the United States

Decided June 15, 2009
- Full case name: Nijhawan v. Holder
- Citations: 557 U.S. 29 (more)

Holding
- For deportation purposes, fraud is an aggravated felony when the loss to the victims exceeds $10,000, and that refers to the particular circumstances in which an offender committed fraud on a particular occasion. That is, the damages amount is not an element of the crime and does not need to be proven beyond a reasonable doubt.

Court membership
- Chief Justice John Roberts Associate Justices John P. Stevens · Antonin Scalia; Anthony Kennedy · David Souter; Clarence Thomas · Ruth Bader Ginsburg; Stephen Breyer · Samuel Alito

Case opinion
- Majority: Breyer, joined by unanimous

Nijhawan v. Holder, 557 U.S. 29 (2009), was a United States Supreme Court case in which the court held that, for deportation purposes, fraud is an aggravated felony when the loss to the victims exceeds $10,000, and that refers to the particular circumstances in which an offender committed fraud on a particular occasion. That is, the damages amount is not an element of the crime and does not need to be proven beyond a reasonable doubt.

== Background ==
Under 8 U.S.C. §1227(a)(2)(A)(iii), a noncitizen "convicted of an aggravated felony any time after admission is deportable." §1101(a)(43)(M)(i) says that an "aggravated felony" includes "an offense that... involves fraud or deceit in which the loss to the... victims exceeds $10,000."

Nijhawan, a noncitizen, was convicted of conspiring to commit mail fraud and related crimes. Because the relevant statutes did not require a finding of loss, the jury made no such finding. However, at sentencing, petitioner stipulated that the loss exceeded $100 million. He was sentenced to prison and required to make $683 million in restitution. The government subsequently sought to deport him from the United States, claiming that he had been convicted of an "aggravated felony." The Immigration Judge found that petitioner's conviction fell within the "aggravated felony" definition. The Board of Immigration Appeals agreed, as did the Third Circuit Court of Appeals, which held that the Immigration Judge could inquire into the underlying facts of a prior fraud conviction for purposes of determining whether the loss to the victims exceeded $10,000.

== Opinion of the court ==
The Supreme Court issued an opinion on June 15, 2009.
