= Dubin v. United States =

- Supreme Court of the United States

Argued February 27, 2023 Decided June 8, 2023
- Full case name: David Fox Dubin v. United States
- Docket no.: 22-10
- Citations: 599 U.S. 110 (more)
- Argument: Oral argument
- Opinion announcement: Opinion announcement

Case history
- Prior: United States v. Dubin, 27 F.4th 1021 (5th Cir. 2021)(en banc), United States v. Dubin 982 F.3d 318 (5th Cir. 2020)., United States v. Dubin (No. 17-cr-00227-XR-2) (W.D. Tex. 2018)

Questions presented
- Whether a person commits aggravated identity theft any time he mentions or otherwise recites someone else's name while committing a predicate offense.

Holding
- Under §1028A(a)(1), a defendant “uses” another person’s means of identification “in relation to” a predicate offense when the use is at the crux of what makes the conduct criminal.

Court membership
- Chief Justice John Roberts Associate Justices Clarence Thomas · Samuel Alito; Sonia Sotomayor · Elena Kagan; Neil Gorsuch · Brett Kavanaugh; Amy Coney Barrett · Ketanji Brown Jackson

Case opinions
- Majority: Sotomayor, joined by Roberts, Thomas, Alito, Kagan, Kavanaugh, Barrett, Jackson
- Concurrence: Gorsuch (in judgment)

Laws applied
- 18 U.S.C. § 1028A

Dubin v. United States, 599 U.S. 110 (2023), was a United States Supreme Court case pertaining to a provision of Title 18 of the United States Code. In the case, the Court settled a circuit split regarding the reach of the federal aggravated identity theft statute.

== Background ==
18 U.S.C. § 1028A, the federal aggravated identity theft statute, states:

Whoever, during and in relation to any felony violation enumerated [elsewhere in the statute], knowingly transfers, possesses, or uses, without lawful authority, a means of identification of another person, shall, in addition to the punishment provided for such felony, be sentenced to a term of imprisonment of 2 years.

David Dubin worked at his father's psychological services company, which was named PARTS. The Hector Garza Center, a youth emergency shelter near San Antonio, hired PARTS to perform psychological assessments for its patients. As part of the arrangement, PARTS was responsible for determining whether Garza's patients were eligible for Medicaid. Based on that finding, PARTS would either file a Medicaid reimbursement claim for its services, or it would bill Garza. In April 2013, Garza asked PARTS to conduct psychological assessments on several of its patients, including one patient known in court filings as "Patient L". After Patient L was tested (but before they were clinically interviewed), Dubin realized that he had already been evaluated within the past year. Lower courts had found that Medicaid would not reimburse providers for more than one such evaluation in a twelve-month period. Patient L was scheduled to be discharged from Garza before this twelve-month period would have elapsed. Additionally, Garza's director told PARTS that the full report on Patient L did not need to be completed.

Dubin directed one of his employees to bill Medicaid for the services actually conducted (i.e., the psychological testing). The Medicaid claim contained Patient L's name and Medicaid ID number. The Medicaid bill contained three factual errors. First, it represented that the psychological testing was conducted by a licensed psychologist rather than a licensed psychological associate (Medicaid distinguishes between the two in its reimbursement rates). Second, it represented that the testing was performed on May 30, 2013, rather than in April. Third, it rounded the duration of the test from 2.5 hours to 3 hours.

== Lower court proceedings ==
=== District court ===
Because of these three misrepresentations, Dubin was charged in the United States District Court for the Western District of Texas with healthcare fraud in violation of 18 U.S.C. §§ 1347–1349. A jury convicted Dubin on these counts. Dubin was also charged with aggravated identity theft under 18 U.S.C. § 1028A. The government did not contest Dubin's ability to lawfully use Patient L's name to file the Medicaid bill. Rather, it argued that Dubin had, without permission (and therefore unlawfully), used Patient L's name to overbill Medicaid, saying that a conviction for healthcare fraud goes "hand in hand" with committing aggravated identity theft. Dubin was found guilty on the charge of aggravated identity theft.

=== Circuit court — panel ===
Dubin appealed his aggravated identity theft conviction to the United States Court of Appeals for the Fifth Circuit. A three-judge panel found that the statute operated as a two-part question for determining criminal activity: Did the defendant use a means of identification (as defined in § 1028(d)(7))? And was that use without any lawful authority, or beyond the scope of the lawful authority given? The panel found that Dubin's actions had satisfied both prongs of this test.

=== Circuit court — en banc ===
On rehearing en banc, the Fifth Circuit affirmed the district court's findings. In a short per curiam opinion, it adopted the reasoning of the three-judge panel.

Chief Judge Richman concurred, along with Judges Smith, Barksdale, Higginson, and Ho. Regarding the aggravated identity theft conviction, Richman stated that although Dubin would typically be allowed to use Patient L's information to bill Medicare, his use in the instant case was nonetheless unlawful; despite having authorization to use Patient L's name, he did not have authorization to use Patient L's name to commit a crime. Judge Richman also acknowledged that the text of the statute provides criminal penalties for Dubin's actions, notwithstanding the fact that his conduct falls outside the common conception of "identity theft".

Judge Oldham concurred, along with judges Smith, Barksdale, Higginson, and Ho. Despite not signing onto the per curiam opinion, he nonetheless voted to uphold Dubin's conviction. In reviewing the district court's application of the statute for plain errors, Oldham concluded that any errors were not plain.

Judge Elrod dissented, along with Judges Jones, Costa, Willett, Duncan, Engelhardt, and Wilson. Elrod stated that Dubin did not commit aggravated identity theft because he did not lie (or make any misrepresentations) about Patient L's identity. Citing cases from the First, Sixth, Seventh, Ninth, and Eleventh Circuits, Elrod stated that it is not enough for a defendant to merely use a person's identity in relation to a predicate fraud to be convicted of aggravated identity theft.

Judge Haynes, citing reasons given in Judge Elrod's dissenting opinion.

Judge Costa dissented, along with judges Jones, Elrod, Elrod, Willett, Duncan, Engelhardt, and Wilson. Citing Supreme Court precedent, Costa argued that the Fifth Circuit should not read federal criminal statutes so broadly when a narrower reading is reasonable. A more reasonable reading of § 1028A, Costa argued, would confine the statute to what is commonly understood to constitute identity theft. Costa indicated that the "without lawful authority" language in the statute should apply only when another person's identity is used without their permission. Since Dubin had Patient L's permission to use their identity, Costa argued that no identity theft occurred in the case.

== Supreme Court ==
On June 30, 2022, Dubin petitioned the Supreme Court to hear his case. On November 10, 2022, the Court granted certiorari. Oral arguments were heard on February 27, 2023. Jeffrey L. Fisher argued on behalf of Dubin. Vivek Suri of the Solicitor General's Office argued on behalf of the United States.

=== Sotomayor's majority opinion ===
Justice Sotomayor delivered the opinion of the Court. It held that a defendant "uses" another person's identity "in relation to" a predicate offense when the use is "at the crux" of what makes the conduct criminal.

Sotomayor favored Dubin's narrower reading of § 1028A, rather than the government's broader reading, saying that the use of another person's identity must have a "genuine nexus" to the predicate offense, rather than just acting as an "ancillary feature".

While the Fifth Circuit had relied on the general, dictionary definitions of "use" and "in relation to', Sotomayor cites prior Supreme Court precedent stating that the meanings of these terms is heavily dependent on context. The contextual approach is further supported, Sotomayor argues, by the fact that the statutory language uses two such context-dependent terms. In light of the title and terms of the statute, she argues that these terms should be read as relating to what is commonly thought of as identity theft, namely the misuse of a means of identification. Focusing on the title of the statute, Sotomayor draws a distinction between the title of neighboring § 1028:

Fraud and related activity in connection with identification documents, authentication features, and information, 18 U.S.C. § 1028

And the much simpler title of § 1028A:

Aggravated identity theft, 18 U.S.C. § 1028A

A broader reading of the statute, one that ignores the title its common meaning, would include, Justice Sotomayor argues, things with little relation to identity theft, such as overbilling. Moreover, including the word "aggravated" to qualify the named crime even further suggests that Congress intended to criminalize a serious type of a particular crime.

Continuing with the text of the statute, Sotomayor focuses on the three verbs uses to define the crime: "transfers", "possesses", and "uses". She argues that the purpose of including the first two was to incorporate into the statute the common meaning of identity theft. Citing prior Supreme Court precedent, Sotomayor states that the third verb, "uses", due to its proximity to the other two should be understood to have a meaning similar to "transfer" and "possess". Additionally, precedent supports reading the three verbs to have distinct, nonsuperfluous meanings. A narrow reading of the statute supports the notion that the use of three verbs is meant to capture the complex form that identity theft may take. Therefore, while "transfer" and "possess" establish theft of a means of identification, "use" establishes a deceitful use, rather than a broader, more general sense of "use".

A broader reading of the statute, Sotomayor argues, would attach a mandatory 2-year minimum sentence to other crimes (such as fraud) that do not impose any mandatory prison sentences. In such a case, generic overbilling that happens to involve means of identification would automatically trigger a 2-year mandatory minimum sentence. A more reasonable, narrower reading of the statute, she argues, would only criminalize activity where the means of identification were "at the crux" of the criminal activity. Sotomayor argues that attributing such a sweeping meaning to an opaquely worded statute would be at odds with prior precedent.

=== Gorsuch's concurring opinion ===
Justice Gorsuch filed an opinion concurring in the judgment. He agreed that Dubin's conviction should be overturned, not because the government had relied on too broad a reading of § 1028A, but because the statute itself is so vaguely worded as to deprive potential offenders of fair notice and due process. His opinion begins:

Whoever among you is not an “aggravated identity thief,” let him cast the first stone. The United States came to this Court with a view of 18 U. S. C. §1028A(a)(1) that would affix that unfortunate label on almost every adult American. Every bill splitter who has overcharged a friend using a mobile-payment service like Venmo. Every contractor who has rounded up his billed time by even a few minutes. Every college hopeful who has overstated his involvement in the high school glee club. All of those individuals, the United States says, engage in conduct that can invite a mandatory 2-year stint in federal prison. The Court today rightly rejects that unserious position. But in so holding, I worry the Court has stumbled upon a more fundamental problem with §1028A(a)(1). That provision is not much better than a Rorschach test. Depending on how you squint your eyes, you can stretch (or shrink) its meaning to convict (or exonerate) just about anyone. Doubtless, creative prosecutors and receptive judges can do the same. Truly, the statute fails to provide even rudimentary notice of what it does and does not criminalize. We have a term for laws like that. We call them vague. And “[i]n our constitutional order, a vague law is no law at all.” United States v. Davis, 588 U. S. ___, ___ (2019) (slip op., at 1).

Gorsuch argues that, while offering guidance to lower courts on how not to read the statute, the majority opinion offers no useful way of interpreting how they should read it. In criticizing the majority's "at the crux" test, Gorsuch poses a hypothetical regarding a waiter that serves one cut of steak, but bills for a more expensive cut, and does so using an electronic payment method. Gorsuch questions the majority's assertion that this waiter has not committed aggravated identity theft. He argues, however, that the "means of identification" (such as a credit card) would indeed be "at the crux" of the fraud. Turning back to the facts of the case, Gorsuch argues that Patient L's identity could reasonably be inferred to be "at the crux" of the fraud, since it was an integral part of the crime – without it, Dubin could not have submitted the Medicaid bill.

Gorsuch argues that, when the penalty is a two-year mandatory minimum, citizens deserve to know what conduct is and is not permitted. Despite the Court's attempts, he argues that the majority opinion does not do enough to specify which conduct constitutes aggravated identity theft, a problem that - he says - Congress alone can fix.
