= List of United States Supreme Court cases, volume 595 =

This is a list of all the United States Supreme Court cases from volume 595 of the United States Reports:

Note: As of December 2025, final bound volumes for the U.S. Supreme Court's United States Reports have been published through volume 585 (June 2018). Newer cases from subsequent future volumes do not yet have official page numbers and typically use three underscores in place of the page number; e.g., Example v. United States, 700 U.S. ___ (2050).

| Case name | Docket no. | Date decided |
|---|---|---|
| Rivas-Villegas v. Cortesluna | 20–1539 | October 18, 2021 |
The two cases had different enough fact patterns, so the lower court's determination that the police officer was not entitled to qualified immunity was not justified.
| City of Tahlequah v. Bond | 20–1668 | October 18, 2021 |
Police officer was entitled to qualified immunity when the officer stepped towards a person, the person retreated into their garage, the police cornered him inside, and the person grabbed a hammer and held it above his head while saying "I have done nothing wrong here, man. I am in my house. I'm doing nothing wrong" before the officers shot him to death.
| Mississippi v. Tennessee | 143/ Orig. 143 | November 22, 2021 |
The waters of the Middle Claiborne Aquifer are subject to the judicial remedy of equitable apportionment.
| Whole Woman's Health v. Jackson | 21–463 | December 10, 2021 |
Abortion providers cannot not sue state-court judges, court clerks, or the state's Attorney General in a pre-enforcement effort to stop the filing of private civil-enforcement lawsuits against the providers.
| United States v. Texas | 21–588 | December 10, 2021 |
Dismissed as improvidently granted.
| Babcock v. Kijakazi | 20–480 | January 13, 2022 |
Civil-service pension payments based on employment as a dual-status military technician are not payments based on "service as a member of a uniformed service."
| Biden v. Missouri | 21A240 | January 13, 2022 |
The injunction prohibiting the enforcement of the HHS mandate that Medicare and Medicaid facilities ensure that their staff—unless exempt for medical or religious reasons or teleworking full-time—are vaccinated against COVID–19 was stayed pending litigation.
| NFIB v. OSHA | 21A244 | January 13, 2022 |
OSHA's vaccine mandate was an unlawful exercise of power, going beyond what Congress tasked it to regulate in the enabling statute.
| Hemphill v. New York | 20–637 | January 20, 2022 |
A criminal defendant does not forfeit his confrontation right merely by making an argument in his defense based on a testimonial out-of-court statement like a plea allocution.
| Hughes v. Northwestern Univ. | 19–1401 | January 24, 2022 |
The Seventh Circuit erred in relying on the participants' ultimate choice over their investments to excuse allegedly imprudent decisions by respondents. Determining whether petitioners state plausible claims against plan fiduciaries for violations of ERISA's duty of prudence requires a context-specific inquiry of the fiduciaries’ continuing duty to monitor investments and to remove imprudent ones.
| Unicolors, Inc v. H&M Hennes & Mauritz, LP | 20–915 | February 24, 2022 |
Lack of either factual or legal knowledge can excuse an inaccuracy in a copyright registration.
| United States v. Zubaydah | 20–827 | March 3, 2022 |
The state secrets privilege applies to information that could confirm or deny the existence of a CIA detention site in Poland. United States Court of Appeals for the Ninth Circuit reversed and remanded with instructions to dismiss application for discovery under §1782.
| Cameron v. EMW Women's Surgical Center, P.S.C. | 20–601 | March 3, 2022 |
The lower court erred by denying the attorney general's motion to intervene.
| United States v. Tsarnaev | 20–443 | March 4, 2022 |
A defendant is entitled to an impartial panel of jurors, not necessarily a panel of jurors who know nothing about the case. Death sentence reinstated.
| Federal Bureau of Investigation v. Fazaga | 20–828 | March 4, 2022 |
The Foreign Intelligence Surveillance Act of 1978 does not override or alter the state secrets doctrine.
| Wooden v. United States | 20–5279 | March 7, 2022 |
Multiple criminal offenses arising from a single criminal episode do not occur on different "occasions" and thus count as only one prior conviction for purposes of the Armed Career Criminal Act.
| Wisconsin Legislature v. Wisconsin Elections Commission | 21A471 | March 23, 2022 |
A state must find that adding majority-minority district is required under the Voting Rights Act, not simply that it would be allowable under the VRA.
| Ramirez v. Collier | 21–5592 | March 24, 2022 |
A Texas prison execution protocol banning all spiritual and religious advisors from being in an execution chamber, or touching a prisoner, during an execution is likely to violate the Religious Land Use and Institutionalized Persons Act's religious protections.
| Houston Community College System v. Wilson | 20–804 | March 24, 2022 |
A local government board member's freedom of speech was not abridged when he was verbally censured by his colleagues.

== See also ==
- List of United States Supreme Court cases by the Roberts Court
- 2021 term opinions of the Supreme Court of the United States
