= Michael H. Graham =

American law professor (born 1943)

Michael Harris Graham (born January 31, 1943) is an American legal scholar in the field of evidence, and emeritus professor of law at the University of Miami School of Law, where he joined the faculty in 1984. Graham has written a substantial number of books and articles on evidence law, including Handbook of Federal Evidence and Graham's Handbook of Illinois Evidence.

== Education and career ==
Graham received a B.S.E. from the University of Pennsylvania in 1964, followed by a J.D. from Columbia Law School, magna cum laude, in 1967, and a master's degree in criminology from the University of Cambridge in 1969. After law school, Graham served as a law clerk to Judge Inzer B. Wyatt of the United States District Court for the Southern District of New York, and was thereafter a Reginald Heber Smith Community Lawyer Fellow with the Western Center on Law and Poverty. He entered private practice for several years, and then joined the faculty of the University of Illinois College of Law in 1974. In 1981, he received a Fulbright fellowship to study the English criminal trial system, and in 1984 he joined the University of Miami faculty, shortly before the 1986 publication of the second edition of his textbook on federal evidence law.

Graham later served as an advisor to the Special Supreme Court Committee on Illinois Evidence, appointed in 2008 to codify Illinois evidence law. The committee's proposed code was adopted by the Supreme Court of Illinois in 2010 as the Illinois Rules of Evidence, effective January 1, 2011. The Illinois Bar Journal described Graham at the time as the author of a leading treatise on Illinois evidence.

== Scholarship ==
Graham has authored numerous books on evidence law, including the multivolume Handbook of Federal Evidence, Graham's Handbook of Illinois Evidence, and Winning Evidence Arguments: Advanced Evidence for the Trial Attorney. The first edition of Handbook of Federal Evidence was reviewed by law professor Edward L. Kimball in the Journal of Legal Education in 1982. Kimball recommended the work to teachers of evidence and trial practice and praised its clarity, usefulness, and thoroughness.

Graham also became an authority on Illinois evidence law. In 1987, the Illinois Appellate Court described Cleary & Graham's Handbook of Illinois Evidence as a "highly authoritative text". A 2012 annotated bibliography of Illinois practice materials in the Southern Illinois University Law Journal described Graham's Handbook of Illinois Evidence as a "thorough treatise on Illinois evidentiary rules and issues" and noted Graham's role as special advisor to the Illinois Supreme Court committee responsible for the state's newly codified rules of evidence.

His 1983 book, Tightening the Reins of Justice in America: A Comparative Analysis of the Criminal Jury Trial in England and the United States, compared the operation of criminal jury trials in the United States and England. The book was reviewed in the Michigan Law Review, the Journal of Legal Education, and The New York Review of Books, with the latter describing the book as providing a useful account of distinctive features of the English system.

Graham coauthored Witness Intimidation: The Law's Response with Lisa Graham in 1985, examining legal mechanisms for preserving and admitting the testimony of witnesses facing intimidation. The book was reviewed in Criminal Justice Review in 1987.
