= Michigan v. Bryant =

- Supreme Court of the United States

Argued October 5, 2010 Decided February 28, 2011
- Full case name: Michigan, Petitioner v. Richard Perry Bryant
- Docket no.: 09-150
- Citations: 562 U.S. 344 (more) 131 S. Ct. 1143; 179 L. Ed. 2d 93
- Argument: Oral argument

Case history
- Prior: Defendant convicted at trial; affirmed, case n°247039, 2004 WL 1882661 (Mich. Ct. App., 2004); vacated and remanded in light of Davis v. Washington, 477 Mich. 902, 722 N.W.2d 797 (2006); affirmed anew, case n°247039, 2007 WL 675471 (Mich. Ct. App., 2006); reversed, 483 Mich. 132, 768 N.W.2d 65 (2009)
- Subsequent: Remanded to Michigan Supreme Court.

Holding
- Dying murder victim identification and description of the shooter and of the location of the shooting were not testimonial statements, because they had a "primary purpose... to enable police assistance to meet an ongoing emergency". Their admission at trial did not violate the defendant rights under the Confrontation Clause.

Court membership
- Chief Justice John Roberts Associate Justices Antonin Scalia · Anthony Kennedy; Clarence Thomas · Ruth Bader Ginsburg; Stephen Breyer · Samuel Alito; Sonia Sotomayor · Elena Kagan

Case opinions
- Majority: Sotomayor, joined by Roberts, Kennedy, Breyer, Alito
- Concurrence: Thomas (in judgment)
- Dissent: Scalia
- Dissent: Ginsburg
- Kagan took no part in the consideration or decision of the case.

Laws applied
- U.S. Const. amend. VI

Michigan v. Bryant, 562 U.S. 344 (2011), was a United States Supreme Court case in which the Court further developed the "primary purpose" test to determine whether statements are "testimonial" for Confrontation Clause purposes. In Bryant, the Court expanded upon the test first articulated in Davis v. Washington, "addressing for the first time circumstances in which the 'ongoing emergency' discussed in Davis extended to a potential threat to the responding police and the public at large."

The Court stated that determination of whether an interrogation's primary purpose was to assist in an "ongoing emergency" was an objective evaluation of the circumstances "in which the encounter occur[ed] and the statements and actions of the parties."

== Background ==
Detroit Police Department officers were dispatched to a gas station parking lot and found Anthony Covington severely wounded lying next to his car. Covington told the police officers that he had been shot by Richard Bryant through the back door of Bryant's house as he turned to leave. The conversation with officers lasted five to ten minutes before ambulance services arrived. Covington died hours later and Bryant was charged with murder.

In general, hearsay, where one person testifies to what another person says as a method of asserting the truth of the matter testified to, is not allowed in US courts. This is true for Michigan state courts as well, where Bryant was charged. This is because rules of evidence traditionally consider many out of court statements unreliable. Additionally, in criminal cases, the 6th amendment to the US Constitution contains the Confrontation Clause which grants criminal defendants the right to face their accusers. Since the person who actually made the potentially incriminating statements would be unable to be in court, the defendant would be denied their right to confront their accuser. However, there are many exceptions to the rule against hearsay which would allow testimony to be given even if it is hearsay. Additionally, not all testimony to another person's statements would be defined as "hearsay" under the definition given in the rules of evidence.

At trial, the officers testified about what Covington said. Bryant was found guilty of murder. The testimony of the officers was challenged by Bryant's legal counsel as testimonial hearsay. The State's position was that Covington's statements would be considered "excited utterances," one exception to the rule against hearsay, and therefore the officers could testify to what Covington said. Ultimately, the Michigan Supreme Court reversed Bryant's conviction, holding that the Sixth Amendment's Confrontation Clause, as explained in Crawford v. Washington (2004), rendered Covington's statements inadmissible testimonial hearsay.

== Opinion of the Court ==
The United States Supreme Court reversed and remanded the Michigan Supreme Court's ruling, and held that the victim's statements were not testimonial hearsay, meaning the Confrontation Clause did not bar the admission of the evidence. The Supreme Court remanded the case back to Michigan courts to decide whether the statements were otherwise permissible under state hearsay rules. The test the court relied on was the primary purpose test. That test draws a distinction between statements made to the authorities that are aimed at gathering facts for the purpose of prosecution versus statements made because there is an ongoing emergency.

== Scalia's Dissent ==
In Justice Antonin Scalia's dissent, he criticized the majority opinion for distorting the "Confrontation Clause jurisprudence" and leaving the clause in "shambles." Scalia stated that for a statement to be "testimonial", the declarant must have intended that the statement be "a solemn declaration rather than an unconsidered or offhand remark," and therefore the investigator's intent was irrelevant.

== See also ==
- List of United States Supreme Court cases, volume 562
