= List of United States Supreme Court cases, volume 557 =

This is a list of all the United States Supreme Court cases from volume 557 of the United States Reports:

Case name	Citation	Date decided
Polar Tankers v. City of Valdez	557 U.S. 1	June 15, 2009
The Tonnage Clause of the Constitution forbids a city with a port to levy a property tax on ships using the harbor.
Nijhawan v. Holder	557 U.S. 29	2009
For deportation purposes, fraud is an aggravated felony when the loss to the victims exceeds $10,000, and that refers to the particular circumstances in which an offender committed fraud on a particular occasion. That is, the damages amount is not an element of the crime and does not need to be proven beyond a reasonable doubt.
District Attorney's Office v. Osborne	557 U.S. 52	2009
In pursuing a civil claim under 42 U.S.C. § 1983, a convicted person does not have a constitutional right to post-conviction access to State’s evidence for DNA testing.
Yeager v. United States	557 U.S. 110	2009
Even when there is an apparent inconsistency between a jury's verdict of acquittal on some counts and its failure to return a verdict on other counts, the Double Jeopardy Clause prevents the government from relitigating facts that were necessarily decided by the acquittals in future prosecutions.
Travelers Indem. Co. v. Bailey	557 U.S. 137	2009
A bankruptcy settlement that immunizes a third party from liability based on events relevant to the bankruptcy is enforceable and cannot be challenged after the Bankruptcy Court approves the settlement with those terms.
Gross v. FBL Financial Services, Inc.	557 U.S. 167	2009
A plaintiff must prove, by preponderance of evidence, that age was the "but for" cause of the adverse employment action for an Age Discrimination in Employment Act claim.
Northwest Austin Municipal Utility District No. 1 v. Holder	557 U.S. 193	2009
Section 5 of the Voting Rights Act of 1965 stands, but districts should be better able to "bail out" of it per Section 4(a).
Forest Grove School District v. T. A.	557 U.S. 230	2009
IDEA authorizes reimbursement for private special-education services when a public school fails to provide a FAPE and the private-school placement is appropriate, regardless of whether the child previously received special-education services through the public school.
Coeur Alaska, Inc. v. Southeast Alaska Conservation Council	557 U.S. 261	2009
The Army Corps of Engineers was the appropriate agency to permit the disposal of mine waste material into Lower Slate Lake.
Melendez-Diaz v. Massachusetts	557 U.S. 305	2009
Sworn affidavits are testimonial in nature, violate the Confrontation Clause under Crawford v. Washington (2004), and do not meet the business records exception to the hearsay rule. The requirements of the Confrontation Clause may not be relaxed because they make the prosecution's task burdensome. "Notice and demand" statutes are constitutional.
Safford Unified School District v. Redding	557 U.S. 364	2009
(1) The search of Redding's underwear violated the Fourth Amendment. (2) Petitioners are protected from liability by qualified immunity. (3) The issue of the school district's liability should be addressed on remand.
Atlantic Sounding Co. v. Townsend	557 U.S. 404	2009
Because punitive damages have long been an accepted remedy under general maritime law, and because neither Miles v. Apex Marine Corp. (1990) nor the Jones Act altered this understanding, punitive damages for the willful and wanton disregard of the maintenance and cure obligation remain available as a matter of general maritime law.
Horne v. Flores	557 U.S. 433	2009
The lower court's interpretation of the Rule 60(b)(5) standard was too strict. Courts should examine four factual and legal areas that may warrant relief for the state: 1) the impact of a new ELL learning program, 2) the impact of No Child Left Behind, 3) the impact of structural and managerial changes in its school system, and 4) the impact of an increased state general education fund.
Cuomo v. Clearing House Ass'n, L.L.C.	557 U.S. 519	2009
12 U.S.C. § 484 and 12 CFR § 7.4000 do not prohibit measures taken by the New York State Attorney General to enforce state fair lending law against national banks. Visitorial powers accorded to the OCC do not preempt state laws regulating banks.
Ricci v. DeStefano	557 U.S. 557	2009
Before an employer can engage in intentional discrimination for the asserted purpose of avoiding or remedying an unintentional, disparate impact, the employer must have a strong basis in evidence to believe that it will be subject to disparate-impact liability if it fails to take the race-conscious, discriminatory action. Because New Haven failed to demonstrate such strong basis in evidence, its action in discarding the tests violated Title VII.
