= Confrontation Clause =

Clause of the Sixth Amendment to the United States Constitution

The Confrontation Clause of the Sixth Amendment to the United States Constitution provides that "in all criminal prosecutions, the accused shall enjoy the right ... to be confronted with the witnesses against him". The right only applies to criminal prosecutions, not civil cases or other proceedings. Generally, the right is to have a face-to-face confrontation with witnesses who are offering testimonial evidence against the accused in the form of cross-examination during a trial. The Fourteenth Amendment makes the right to confrontation applicable to the states and not just the federal government.

In 2004, the Supreme Court of the United States formulated a new test in Crawford v. Washington to determine whether the Confrontation Clause applies in a criminal case.

The Confrontation Clause has its roots in both English common law, protecting the right of cross-examination, and Roman law, which guaranteed persons accused of a crime the right to look their accusers in the eye. In noting the right's long history, the United States Supreme Court has cited Acts of the Apostles 25:16, which reports the Roman governor Porcius Festus, discussing the proper treatment of his prisoner Paul: "It is not the manner of the Romans to deliver any man up to die before the accused has met his accusers face-to-face, and has been given a chance to defend himself against the charges." It is also cited in Shakespeare's Richard II, Blackstone's treatises, and statutes.

== Testimonial hearsay ==
In 2004, in Crawford v. Washington, the Supreme Court of the United States significantly redefined the application of the Sixth Amendment's right to confrontation. In Crawford, the Supreme Court changed the inquiry from whether the evidence offered had an "indicia of reliability" to whether the evidence is testimonial hearsay. The Crawford Court decided the key issue was whether the evidence was testimonial because of the Sixth Amendment's use of the word "witness". Quoting a 1828 dictionary, the Court explained that a witness is one who "bear[s] testimony" and that "testimony" refers to a "solemn declaration or affirmation made for the purpose of establishing some fact". Nonetheless, in Crawford, the Supreme Court explicitly declined to provide a "comprehensive" definition of "testimonial" evidence. The Crawford decision left the other basic components of the Confrontation Clause's applicability—the witness's availability and the scope of the cross examination—unchanged.

In Davis v. Washington and its companion case, Hammon v. Indiana, the Court undertook the task of defining testimonial hearsay:

Statements are nontestimonial when made in the course of police interrogation under circumstances objectively indicating that the primary purpose of the interrogation is to enable police assistance to meet an ongoing emergency. They are testimonial when the circumstances indicate that there is no ongoing emergency, and that the primary purpose of the interrogation is to establish or prove past events potentially relevant to later criminal prosecution.

The Davis Court noted several factors that, objectively considered, help determine whether a statement is testimonial:

- Whether the statement describes past events or events as they are happening;
- Whether the purpose of the statement is to assist in investigation of a crime or, on the other hand, provide information relevant to some other purpose; and
- The level of formality of the exchange in which the statement is made.

The court noted that a single conversation with, for example, a 911 operator may contain both statements that are intended to address an ongoing emergency and statements that are for the purpose of assisting police investigation of a crime. The latter are testimonial statements because they are the sort of statements that an objectively reasonable person, listening to the statements, would expect to be used in an investigation or prosecution.

== Availability ==
If a statement is testimonial, the person making the statement must generally be available for cross examination. An exception to this rule is if the witness is unavailable. But even where the witness is unavailable, the defendant must have had a prior opportunity to confront the witness through cross examination.

A witness may be unavailable for a variety of reasons. A common reason for a witness to be unavailable is that the witness is claiming a Fifth Amendment privilege against self incrimination. Other privileges are also a source of unavailability. Witnesses may also be unavailable because they have died, had memory loss, or simply decided not to cooperate as a witness against the defendant.

The obvious may also occur, a witness may be intimidated, seriously injured, or murdered, and his prior statements then are usually not admissible even if it appears the defendant caused the nonappearance. The federal witness protection program was developed because of the difficulty of prosecuting cases where witnesses would disappear shortly before trial. These programs frequently require the witness to leave his residence or even family so that he can be protected before the trial occurs.

== Cross-examination ==
Even where the witness is unavailable, the defendant usually has a right to cross-examine the witness. An exception to this rule, forfeiture by wrongdoing, is discussed below.

The more obvious violations of the right to cross-examine witnesses are those where the defendant has never had the opportunity to cross-examine the witness at all, in any setting, or on any subject. The closer cases are those where some cross-examination has occurred, either at trial or prior to trial.

Generally, having the opportunity to cross-examine a witness at trial will satisfy the Confrontation Clause's guarantee. And trial courts are given "broad discretion ... to preclude repetitive and unduly harassing interrogation." The Supreme Court has emphasized that the "Confrontation Clause guarantees an opportunity for effective cross-examination, not cross-examination that is in whatever way, and to whatever extent, the defendant might wish. Nonetheless, a trial court cannot preclude cross-examination on some subjects. Besides the subject matter of the case, the crime for which a defendant is charged, a defendant has the right to attack the credibility or impeach the testimony of the witness. Despite trial courts' "broad discretion", it is an error to limit defendants from cross-examining witnesses on an area that would expose a "prototypical form of bias" that would be relevant to the jury's assessment of that witness's credibility. Examples of such biases include being on probation as a juvenile delinquent, even where the state normally considers such a status to be protected confidential information; having charges dropped in exchange for testimony, despite a specific denial that dropping the charges had any effect on the testimony; and shared allegiances of the victim and witness, including gang membership.

In Crawford v. Washington, 541 U.S. 36 (2004), the Supreme Court increased the scope of the Confrontation Clause by ruling that "testimonial" out-of-court statements are inadmissible if the accused did not have the opportunity to cross-examine that accuser and that accuser is unavailable at trial. In Davis v. Washington 547 U.S. 813 (2006), the Court ruled that "testimonial" refers to any statement that an objectively reasonable person in the declarant's situation would believe likely to be used in court. In Melendez-Diaz v. Massachusetts, 557 U.S. 305 (2009), and Bullcoming v. New Mexico, 564 U.S. 647 (2011), the Court ruled that admitting a lab chemist's analysis into evidence, without having him testify, violated the Confrontation Clause. In Michigan v. Bryant, 562 U.S. 344 (2011), the Court ruled that the "primary purpose" of a shooting victim's statement as to who shot him, and the police's reason for questioning him, each had to be objectively determined. If the "primary purpose" was for dealing with an "ongoing emergency", then any such statement was not testimonial and so the Confrontation Clause would not require the person making that statement to testify in order for that statement to be admitted into evidence.

== Exceptions to the right of confrontation ==
In Crawford, the Supreme Court noted that two exceptions to the common law right of confrontation were acknowledged at the time the constitution was written: forfeiture by wrongdoing and dying declarations. Only the former has been explicitly adopted by the Court.

=== Forfeiture by wrongdoing ===
Where the defendant makes the witness unavailable for the purpose of preventing the witness from testifying, the defendant forfeits the right to confront the witness. This exception only applies to circumstances where the defendant acts with the purpose of preventing the testimony, but not to other circumstances where the defendant may nonetheless be blameworthy. For example, the testimonial statements of an uncross-examined murder victim are not admissible against the person who committed the murder unless the murder was committed for the purpose of preventing the victim from testifying.

It is the prosecution's burden to prove, by a preponderance of evidence, that the defendant secured the witness's unavailability for the purpose of preventing the witness to testify. Because it is quite difficult to prove a defendant's blame, the intimidation or murder of witnesses has been a large problem in United States trials, necessitating the creation in the federal courts of a special program to relocate witnesses to prevent them from harm.

=== Dying declarations ===
Dying declarations, although noted by the Crawford Court as a historic exception to the common law right of confrontation, have not yet been explicitly acknowledged by the Court as an exception to the Confrontation Clause right. Lower courts have recognized the exception, but during oral argument in Michigan v. Bryant, the Court discussed the exception at length and frequently implied that the exception might apply, as it had done in Crawford and Giles.

== Harmless error and standards of review ==
Confrontation Clause violations have historically been subject to harmless error review. This means that even if evidence has been admitted in violation of the Confrontation Clause, a defendant is not entitled to a new trial if the reviewing court is convinced beyond a reasonable doubt that the inadmissible evidence did not contribute to the verdict. At least one scholar has argued that the Supreme Court's decision in Crawford v. Washington reopened the question of whether Confrontation Clause violations are subject to harmless error review. Harmless error is not a standard of review, and is an analysis for whether the error might have affected the jury's decision.

Where a defendant fails to object to the inadmissible evidence at the time of trial or fails to specify that she or he is objecting on Confrontation Clause grounds, the reviewing court will sometimes only review for more substantial errors such as "plain error" or an error that results in a manifest injustice. Federal Circuit Courts of Appeal review unobjected to Confrontation Clause errors for plain error. State courts vary widely in their requirements for reviewing Confrontation Clause errors, but many review for either plain error, manifest injustice, or another similar standard. In many instances, courts reverse on Confrontation Clause grounds without analyzing whether an error is harmless. The most common reason for omitting such an analysis is the government's failure to raise harmlessness as an issue. Generally, defendants do not raise harmlessness unless the government does so.

== Interaction with other laws ==
The states are free to interpret similar clauses in state constitutions more strictly than the Supreme Court's interpretation of the federal Confrontation Clause. The Fourteenth Amendment makes the right to confrontation applicable to the states and not just the federal government.

Because many jurisdictions, including the federal courts and a number of states, practice constitutional abstention many cases that include Confrontation Clause violations are decided on other grounds. Constitutional abstention is a judicial preference to resolve dispositive non-constitutional issues first, and only turning to constitutional issues if they are necessary to resolve the case. In Confrontation Clause cases, constitutional abstention most typically occurs where the court resolves a hearsay issue based on the relevant evidence code before turning to the Confrontation Clause analysis. Thus, a preference for interpreting other closely related laws first often leaves Confrontation Clause issues unaddressed.

== Other sources of a right to confront witnesses ==
The Due Process Clauses of the Fifth and Fourteenth Amendments also require confrontation as an element of due process. State statutes and constitutions are another source of the right to confront witnesses.

Article 14.3(e) of the International Covenant on Civil and Political Rights, of which the United States is a party, provides a number of procedural rights, including the right of the defendant to call and examine witnesses.

== See also ==
- Cross-examination
- Maryland v. Craig (testimony by closed-circuit television)
