= Davis v. Washington =

- Supreme Court of the United States

Argued March 20, 2006 Decided June 19, 2006
- Full case name: Adrian Martell Davis, Petitioner v. Washington; Hershel Hammon, Petitioner v. Indiana
- Docket no.: 05-5224
- Citations: 547 U.S. 813 (more) 126 S. Ct. 2266; 165 L. Ed. 2d 224; 2006 U.S. LEXIS 4886; 74 U.S.L.W. 4356; 19 Fla. L. Weekly Fed. S 299
- Argument: Oral argument

Case history
- Prior: On writ of certiorari to the Supreme Court of Washington; on writ of certiorari to the Supreme Court of Indiana; State v. Davis, 154 Wn.2d 291, 111 P.3d 844, 2005 Wash. LEXIS 462 (2005) Hammon v. State, 829 N.E.2d 444, 2005 Ind. LEXIS 541 (Ind., 2005)
- Subsequent: On remand at, Remanded by Hammon v. State, 2006 Ind. LEXIS 793 (Ind., Sept. 7, 2006)

Holding
- A 911 phone call describing an "ongoing emergency" is not testimonial in nature, and thus may be admitted at trial even if the caller is not available without violating the Sixth Amendment's Confrontation Clause.

Court membership
- Chief Justice John Roberts Associate Justices John P. Stevens · Antonin Scalia; Anthony Kennedy · David Souter; Clarence Thomas · Ruth Bader Ginsburg; Stephen Breyer · Samuel Alito

Case opinions
- Majority: Scalia, joined by Roberts, Stevens, Kennedy, Souter, Ginsburg, Breyer, Alito
- Concur/dissent: Thomas

Laws applied
- Crawford v. Washington, Sixth Amendment Confrontation Clause.

Davis v. Washington, 547 U.S. 813 (2006), was a case decided by the Supreme Court of the United States and written by Justice Antonin Scalia that established the test used to determine whether a hearsay statement is "testimonial" for Confrontation Clause purposes. Two years prior to its publication, in Crawford v. Washington, the Supreme Court held that the Confrontation Clause bars “admission of testimonial statements of a witness who did not appear at trial unless he was unavailable to testify, and the defendant had had a prior opportunity for cross-examination.” The Supreme Court declined to define "testimonial" in Crawford which left lower courts without any guidance. However, in Davis v. Washington, along with Hammon v. Indiana which was consolidated with Davis, the Court clarified the meaning of "testimonial" and articulated a new standard.

Specifically, the Court stated that:

Statements are nontestimonial when made in the course of police interrogation under circumstances objectively indicating that the primary purpose of the interrogation is to enable police assistance to meet an ongoing emergency. They are testimonial when the circumstances objectively indicate that there is no such ongoing emergency, and that the primary purpose of the interrogation is to establish or prove past events potentially relevant to later criminal prosecution.

The Court further developed this standard in Michigan v. Bryant.

== Davis v. Washington ==
=== Background ===
Davis was arrested after Michelle McCottry called 911 and told the operator that Davis had beaten her with his fists and then left. At trial, McCottry did not testify, but the 911 call was offered as evidence of the connection between Davis and McCottry's injuries. Davis objected, arguing that presenting the recording without giving him the opportunity to cross-examine McCottry violated his Sixth Amendment right to confront his accuser as interpreted by the U.S. Supreme Court in Crawford v. Washington. The Washington Supreme Court disagreed, finding that the call was not "testimonial" and was therefore different from the statements at issue in Crawford.

=== Opinion ===
The Court held that McCottry's statements were nontestimonial. Although McCottry identified her attacker to the 911 operator, she provided the information intending to help the police resolve an "ongoing emergency," not to testify to a past crime. Factors that were determinative in the Court's analysis were:

- McCottry was "speaking about events as they were actually happening," rather than describing past events;
- "McCottry's call was plainly a call for help against bona fide physical threat";
- The "elicited statements were necessary to be able to resolve the present emergency, rather than simply to learn ... what had happened in the past"
- The fact that McCottry was providing frantic answers over the phone, in an untranquil environment.

== Hammon v. Indiana ==
Davis v. Washington was decided alongside Hammon v. Indiana. In contrast to Davis, the statements in Hammon were "easily" found by the Court to be testimonial.

In Hammon, responding to a domestic disturbance call, police found Amy Hammon on the porch appearing frightened and Herschel Hammon inside. After getting permission to go inside, the police saw a broken furnace in the kitchen and glass on the floor. The police proceeded to question the pair separately, and rebuffed multiple attempts by Herschel to enter the room where his wife was being interrogated. Ultimately, the wife signed an affidavit stating that Herschel had broken their furnace, shoved her down on the floor into the broken glass, and hit her in the chest, among other things. Herschel was charged with felony violation of a domestic no-contact order. However, at Herschel's trial, Amy Hammon refused to testify. Nonetheless, the trial court allowed her affidavit to be admitted after it was authenticated by the interrogating officer.

The Supreme Court held that the affidavit was testimonial because it was "entirely clear from the circumstances that the interrogation was part of an investigation into possibly criminal past conduct." Specifically, the Court noted the following facts as indicative of the statements in the affidavit being testimonial:

- Amy Hammon told the police "things were fine" when the officers arrived;
- The interrogating officer stated that he heard no arguments nor saw anything being broken while at the apartment;
- The affidavit responses were elicited after the interrogating officer had already questioned Amy Hammon once before;
- Ms. Hammon was interrogated in a separate room from her husband.

== Thomas's Concurrence/Dissent ==
Justice Clarence Thomas wrote a separate opinion concurring in part and dissenting in part. He argued that though McCottry's statements were not testimonial, the Court should not "guess" at the primary motive behind the statements.
