= Crawford v. Washington =

- Supreme Court of the United States

Argued November 10, 2003 Decided March 8, 2004
- Full case name: Michael D. Crawford v. State of Washington
- Docket no.: 02-9410
- Citations: 541 U.S. 36 (more) 124 S. Ct. 1354; 158 L. Ed. 2d 177; 2004 U.S. LEXIS 1838; 72 U.S.L.W. 4229; 63 Fed. R. Evid. Serv. (Callaghan) 1077; 17 Fla. L. Weekly Fed. S 181
- Argument: Oral argument
- Opinion announcement: Opinion announcement

Case history
- Prior: Defendant convicted, Thurston County Superior Court, 11-19-99; reversed, 107 Wn. App. 1025 (2001); reversed, conviction reinstated, 54 P.3d 656 (Wash. 2002); cert. granted, 539 U.S. 914 (2003).
- Subsequent: None

Questions presented
- Does playing out-of-court testimony to a jury, with no chance for cross-examination, violate a defendant's Sixth Amendment guarantee that "[i]n all criminal prosecutions, the accused shall enjoy the right...to be confronted with the witnesses against him"?

Holding
- The use at trial of out-of-court statements made to police by an unavailable witness violated a criminal defendant's Sixth Amendment right to confront witnesses against him.

Court membership
- Chief Justice William Rehnquist Associate Justices John P. Stevens · Sandra Day O'Connor; Antonin Scalia · Anthony Kennedy; David Souter · Clarence Thomas; Ruth Bader Ginsburg · Stephen Breyer

Case opinions
- Majority: Scalia, joined by Stevens, Kennedy, Souter, Thomas, Ginsburg, Breyer
- Concurrence: Rehnquist (in judgment), joined by O'Connor

Laws applied
- U.S. Const. amend. VI, XIV
- This case overturned a previous ruling or rulings
- Ohio v. Roberts (1980)

Crawford v. Washington, 541 U.S. 36 (2004), is a landmark United States Supreme Court decision that reformulated the standard for determining when the admission of hearsay statements in criminal cases is permitted under the Confrontation Clause of the Sixth Amendment. The Court held that prior testimonial statements of witnesses who have since become unavailable may not be admitted without cross-examination.

== Background ==
Michael Crawford and his wife Sylvia Crawford confronted Kenneth Lee over an allegation that Lee had attempted to rape Mrs. Crawford. Michael Crawford stabbed Lee in the torso. Crawford claimed he had acted in self-defense when he believed Lee had picked up a weapon. Lee denied doing anything that might make Crawford believe he was trying to attack him.

Both Mr. and Mrs. Crawford were questioned by police after receiving a Miranda warning. Mr. Crawford said to the police that he was not sure if Mr. Lee had a weapon, but that Crawford believed at the time that Lee did. Mrs. Crawford, being interrogated separately, at first said that she had not seen the attack, but under further questioning said that she had seen the attack and that Lee was not holding a weapon.

=== Trial proceeding ===
At trial, Mrs. Crawford could not be compelled to testify by the state, since Washington's spousal privilege law states that a spouse cannot testify in court without the accused spouse's consent (except when a spouse is a complainant). The deputy prosecutor, Robert Lund, sought to introduce Mrs. Crawford's statement to the police as evidence that Mr. Crawford had no reasonable belief that he was in danger from Mr. Lee. Generally, out-of-court statements by persons other than the accused are excluded as hearsay. But Washington invoked a hearsay exception for statements against penal interest.

The defense counsel objected to the admission of the wife's statement, on the ground that Mr. Crawford would be unable to confront (i.e., cross-examine) Mrs. Crawford on her statement without waiving spousal privilege, and that this would be a violation of the Confrontation Clause of the Sixth Amendment. The court allowed the statement to be admitted on the basis that the statement was reliable, as it was partially corroborated by Mr. Crawford's statement to police, amongst other things.

The statement was allowed into evidence at the trial, and the prosecution relied on it heavily in its closing argument, stating that it completely refuted the defendant's claim of self defense.

=== Procedural history ===
Michael Crawford was convicted at the trial level. However, the Washington Court of Appeals reversed that decision. After applying a nine-factor test to determine whether Sylvia's statement was reliable, and therefore admissible under the doctrine of Ohio v. Roberts, the court determined it was not, and gave several reasons why. Nonetheless, the Washington Supreme Court reinstated the conviction, ruling that the witness's statement was reliable under Roberts. In particular, the court noted that Michael and Sylvia Crawford's statements interlocked, and therefore concluded that Sylvia's statements were admissible.

=== Discussion ===
The Confrontation Clause of the Sixth Amendment (applicable to the States through the Fourteenth Amendment) provides: "In all criminal prosecutions, the accused shall enjoy the right... to be confronted with the witnesses against him." This right has a very specific purpose. The focus of the Clause is on getting the truth out of a witness, and allowing a trier of fact to determine whether the witness indeed told the truth. Even given these important goals, this right is not absolute.

Admission of out-of-court statements, therefore, is and has been possible. For over 20 years prior to Crawford, the controlling standard for admitting statements that unavailable witnesses made to other persons was that of Ohio v. Roberts. According to the Court in Roberts, if a witness is unavailable, that witness's testimony can be admitted through a third person if it bears "adequate indicia of reliability". This was true if a statement fell within a "firmly rooted hearsay exception" or had "particularized guarantees of trustworthiness".

When Michael Crawford was accused of stabbing Kenneth Lee on August 5, 1999, the Roberts standard was still controlling law. Crawford and his wife, Sylvia, were questioned separately by police regarding a stabbing incident that had taken place at Lee's home. The statements of the two were generally corroborating, but while Michael had claimed self-defense, Sylvia implied that Michael was not protecting himself when he stabbed Lee. At trial, the state moved to admit Sylvia's statement under Roberts. The trial court admitted the evidence, "noting several reasons why it was trustworthy".

== Supreme Court decision and rationale ==
The United States Supreme Court held that the use of the spouse's recorded statement made during police interrogation violated the defendant's Sixth Amendment right to be confronted with the witnesses against the defendant where the spouse, because of the state law marital privilege, did not testify at the trial and so was unavailable.

Associate Justice Antonin Scalia, writing for the majority, expressed concern over the inconsistent results reached by courts under Ohio v. Roberts, the standard used by the Washington state courts. He thought the Crawford decisions of the various levels of Washington state courts epitomized this problem. Justice Scalia gave a thorough history of the Confrontation Clause, explaining how the Clause became part of the Constitution using famous English cases, such as that of Sir Walter Raleigh. He then described the context in which the Constitutional Framers drafted the clause, and displayed how early American courts interpreted the clause.

This history, Scalia concluded, clearly shows that the Confrontation Clause was directed at keeping "ex parte" examinations out of the evidentiary record. Specifically, the Confrontation Clause applies to "witnesses" against the accused, meaning those who "bear testimony". Relying on this and the historical record, Scalia stated, "the Framers would not have allowed admission of testimonial statements of a witness who did not appear at trial unless he was unavailable to testify, and the defendant had had a prior opportunity for cross-examination." Scalia determined that a prior opportunity for cross-examination was mandatory, and dispositive of whether or not testimonial statements of an unavailable witness are admissible. Testimonial statements are formal declarations, i.e., those made to law enforcement or government personnel. "Dispensing with confrontation because testimony is obviously reliable is akin to dispensing with jury trial because a defendant is obviously guilty."

The Crawford Court determined that where non-testimonial statements are involved, the Confrontation Clause allows a court to use its discretion to determine the reliability of the statements. "Where testimonial evidence is at issue, however, the Sixth Amendment demands what the common law required: unavailability and a prior opportunity for cross-examination. ... [T]he only indicium of reliability sufficient to satisfy constitutional demands is the one the Constitution actually prescribes: confrontation."

== Concurrence ==
Chief Justice William Rehnquist concurred in the result, but would have decided the case on narrower grounds, within the older Roberts framework. Rehnquist, joined by O'Connor, stated he would not have expanded the right of defendants to exclude out-of-court statements on the basis that they could not confront the witness.

== Subsequent developments ==
This decision had an immediate, profound effect upon the ability of prosecutors to prove their cases through the use of evidence that had previously been admissible via various exceptions to the hearsay rule. Justice Scalia's opinion explicitly states that any out-of-court statement that is "testimonial" in nature is not admissible, unless the declarant is unavailable to testify in court, and the defendant has had a prior opportunity to cross-examine him or her. However, the opinion does not define "testimonial", which has allowed courts across the country to determine that issue for themselves.

Legal scholars' main criticism of the decision was the courts' failure to define "testimonial". One of the main areas in which lower courts struggled to resolve this issue was the use of 911 calls during the course of trial where the caller is not available to testify. This was the factual situation in Davis v. Washington, in which the Court laid out a definition of "testimonial". Other cases have dealt with the issue of the previously common practice of admitting certain types of certified documents under the business records or public records exception to the hearsay rule.

Crawford, and the decisions following it, also radically changed the handling of domestic violence cases by curtailing evidence-based prosecution, a common practice, which allows the accused to be prosecuted without the participation of their accusers in the criminal court process. Evidence-based prosecution relies heavily on admission of statements under hearsay exceptions to reproduce the evidentiary effect of a victim testifying in court. The Crawford Court's decision renders most of these statements inadmissible without the accuser coming to court and testifying against the person he or she is accusing.
