= 5-4 =

Podcast about the US Supreme Court

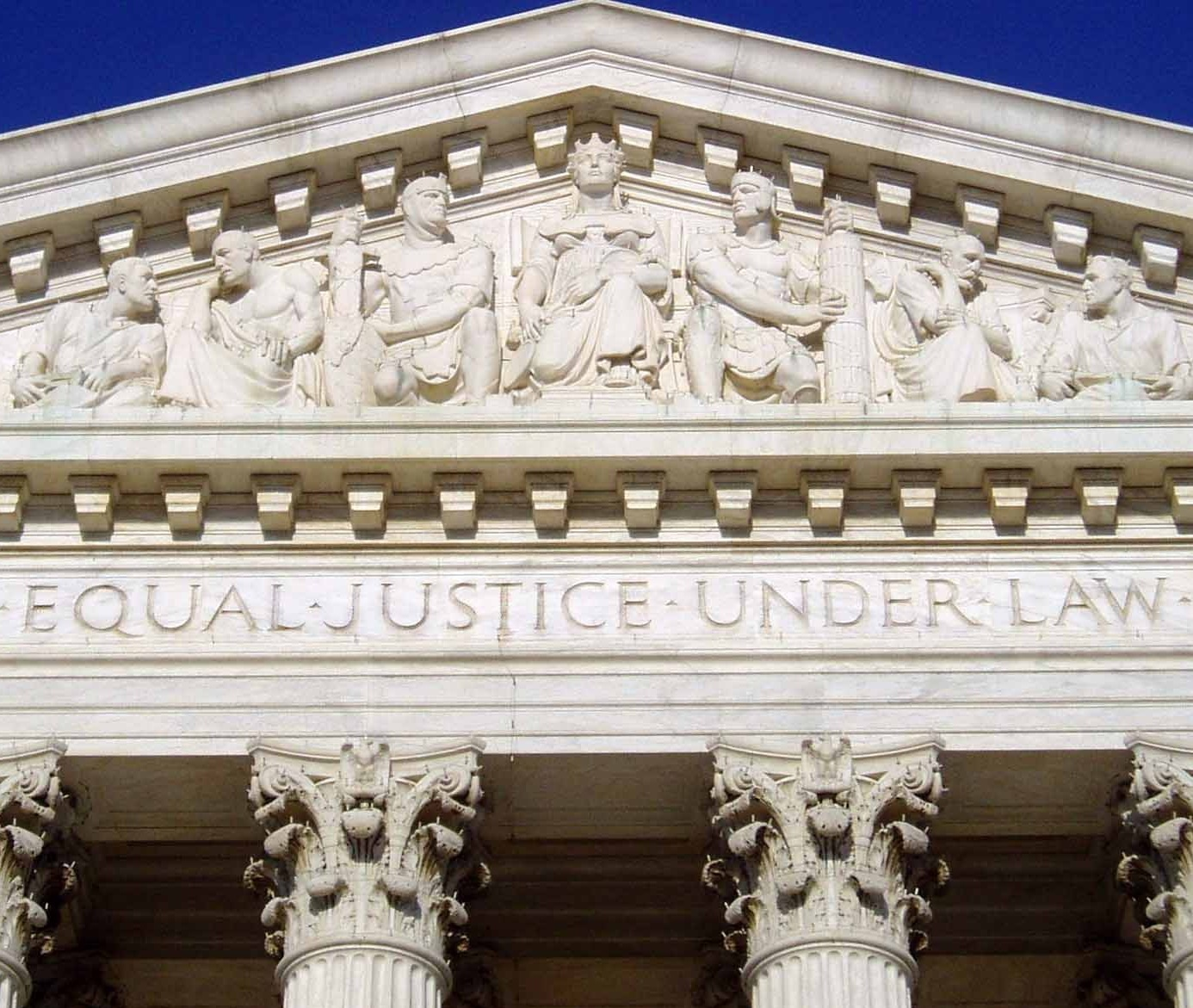
- The podcast artwork is based on the Supreme Court Building
- Genre: Politics
- Format: Audio
- Language: English

Cast and voices
- Hosted by: Rhiannon Hamam; Michael Liroff; Peter Shamshiri
- Narrated by: Leon Neyfakh

Music
- Theme music composed by: Spatial Relations

Production
- Production: Prologue Projects
- Length: Approximately 40–60 minutes

Publication
- No. of episodes: 151
- Original release: February 25, 2020

Related
- Website: Official website

5-4 (pronounced "five to four") is a podcast that covers the U.S. Supreme Court from a critical, progressive perspective. The podcast's tagline describes it as being "about how much the Supreme Court sucks", and providing an "irreverent tour of all the ways in which the law is shaped by politics." It was launched by Leon Neyfakh's Prologue Projects in partnership with the Westwood One Podcast Network.

== Premise ==
The hosts are self-described advocates for legal realism. A consistent theme is also a demonstration of the primary role of political ideology in shaping Supreme Court decision, as opposed to any specific judicial philosophy.

The first episode of the podcast was about Bush v. Gore. Most episodes center around a specific Supreme Court case, typically one that the hosts believe was wrongly decided, and they discuss the ramifications of the court's decision on law and society. The hosts also sporadically release episodes on general political or legal topics, such as profiles on Supreme Court justices or commentary on elections.

== History ==
5-4 was launched in February 2020 by Leon Neyfakh's Prologue Projects in partnership with Westwood One Podcast Network (which has since been renamed Cumulus Podcast Network). Its hosts, Rhiannon, Peter, and Michael, maintain semi-anonymous profiles as podcast hosts, disclosing only their first names and a "handful of biographical details" in any given episode. Rhiannon worked as a public defender in Austin, Texas; Peter previously served as in-house counsel for MetLife and was fired upon his employer's finding out about his role on the podcast; Michael was a former associate at Sullivan & Cromwell, and self-described "reformed corporate lawyer."

Neyfakh's original advertising partnership with Westwood One failed to generate significant revenue for the podcast, so the decision was made to instead fund its production through Patreon. The following month, Nicholas Quah wrote in Vulture: "After its pivot to Patreon, 5-4 is now significantly better positioned for the next stage of its life, and its experience stands as a good example of the fact that a race for scale isn't the only way to run a shop in this business."

== Notable guests ==
Elected American politicians have been guests on the show. Sheldon Whitehouse, the junior Senator from Rhode Island, appeared on the podcast in 2021. Senator Elizabeth Warren, a "fan", was a guest in July 2022. Representatives Ro Khanna and Mondaire Jones appeared in separate episodes, discussing court reform.

Jamelle Bouie discussed the Democratic political strategy in July 2022.

Alec Karakatsanis appeared, criticizing the U.S. legal system.

== Reception ==
Within a week of its launch in February 2020, the 5-4 Patreon had accumulated almost 3,000 paid subscribers, enough to generate roughly $200,000 in revenue each year. As of July 2022, it earns $35,000 per month. It is the 39th most popular podcast tracked by Graphtreon, and the 101st most popular Patreon project overall. The podcast has typically been well-received, with the hosts' "funny, forceful argumentation" and "enthusiastically acidic takes on the once-widely revered American legal institution" praised for making the law more accessible to its listeners and everyday people. It particularly gained popularity in the summer of 2022, after the overturning of Roe v. Wade under Dobbs v. Jackson Women's Health Organization; the month of the Dobbs decision, the number of episode downloads increased 90% from the last year.

== Episodes ==
As of June 26, 2025, 5–4 has had the following episodes:

=== 2020 ===
No.	Title	Guest	Original release date
1	"Bush v. Gore"	None	February 25, 2020
2	"Citizens United v. FEC"	None	March 3, 2020
3	"Fisher v. University of Texas"	None	March 10, 2020
Includes discussion of Fisher I and Fisher II
4	"Shelby County v. Holder"	None	March 17, 2020
5	"Terry v. Ohio"	None	March 24, 2020
6	"NFIB v. Sebelius"	None	March 31, 2020
7	"Trump v. Hawaii"	None	April 7, 2020
8	"Emergency Episode: RNC v. DNC"	None	April 8, 2020
9	"Castle Rock v. Gonzales"	None	April 14, 2020
10	"Kelo v. New London"	None	April 21, 2020
11	"DC v. Heller"	None	April 28, 2020
12	"The Biden Court"	None	May 5, 2020
Episode discusses the possible effects of the 2020 United States elections on the Supreme Court and how it might change under Joe Biden's presidency
13	"Clapper v. Amnesty International"	None	May 12, 2020
14	"Tison v. Arizona"	None	May 19, 2020
15	"Buck v. Bell"	None	May 26, 2020
16	"Burwell v. Hobby Lobby"	None	June 2, 2020
17	"Hernandez v. Mesa"	Steve Vladeck	June 9, 2020
18	"Bostock v. Clayton County, Georgia"	None	June 16, 2020
19	"Exxon Shipping v. Baker"	None	June 17, 2020
20	"Qualified Immunity"	None	June 23, 2020
21	"Janus v. AFSCME"	Samuel Bagenstos	June 30, 2020
22	"Buckley v. Valeo"	None	July 7, 2020
23	"Epic Systems v. Lewis"	None	July 14, 2020
24	"Bennis v. Michigan"	None	July 21, 2020
25	"Term Recap: 2019–2020"	None	August 4, 2020
26	"Milliken v. Bradley"	Leon Neyfakh	August 11, 2020
27	"Boy Scouts of America v. Dale"	None	August 18, 2020
28	"Nielsen v. Preap"	None	August 25, 2020
29	"Flood v. Kuhn"	Adam	September 1, 2020
30	"Voting Rights"	None	September 8, 2020
31	"LA v. Lyons"	None	September 15, 2020
32	"What RBG Didn't Understand"	None	September 21, 2020
Discusses Ruth Bader Ginsburg's decision to not retire under Obama
33	"Amy Coney Barrett is a Right Wing Freak"	None	September 29, 2020
34	"'What if Trump Dies?' And Other Questions"	None	October 6, 2020
35	"The Electoral College Coup is Coming"	None	October 13, 2020
36	"Rucho v. Common Cause"	None	October 20, 2020
37	"How to Fix the Court feat. Rep. Ro Khanna"	Ro Khanna	October 27, 2020
TBA	"Reliving Bush v. Gore"	None	November 3, 2020
The episode on Bush v. Gore is replayed after an introduction discussing cases about the 2020 US election.
38	"The Courts Can't Save Him"	None	November 10, 2020
39	"Arizona Free Enterprise v. Bennett"	None	November 17, 2020
40	"Ashcroft v. Iqbal"	None	December 1, 2020
41	"Roman Catholic Diocese v. Cuomo"	None	December 8, 2020
42	"Herrera v. Collins"	None	December 15, 2020
43	"5–4 x Know Your Enemy"	Know Your Enemy	December 29, 2020
This crossover episode with Know Your Enemy discusses the conservative legal movement.

=== 2021 ===
No.	Title	Guest	Original release date
44	"The Rise and Fall of Roe v. Wade, Pt. 1"	None	January 12, 2021
45	"The Rise and Fall of Roe v. Wade, Pt. 2"	None	January 19, 2021
Discusses Planned Parenthood v. Casey
46	"Morse v. Frederick"	None	January 26, 2021
47	"Navarette v. California"	None	February 2, 2021
48	"US v. Morrison"	None	February 9, 2021
49	"Atkins v. Virginia"	None	February 16, 2021
50	"McCleskey v. Kemp ft. Josie Duffy Rice"	Josie Duffy Rice	February 23, 2021
TBA	"Antonin Scalia [PATREON-ONLY]"	None	March 2, 2021
51	"San Antonio ISD v. Rodriguez ft. Alec Karakatsanis"	Alec Karakatsanis	March 9, 2021
52	"Toyota Motor Manufacturing, Kentucky Inc. v. Williams"	None	March 16, 2021
TBA	"The Worst of the Worst: The Trump Judges [PATREON-ONLY]"	None	March 23, 2021
53	"Connick v. Thompson"	None	March 30, 2021
54	"5–4 x Even More News"	Katy Stoll, Cody Johnson	April 6, 2021
This crossover episode discusses recent voting rights cases and the For the People Act.
55	"Hoffman Plastic Compounds, Inc. v. National Labor Relations Board"	None	April 13, 2021
TBA	"The Insular Cases [PATREON-ONLY]"	None	April 20, 2021
56	"Bowles v. Russell"	Josie Duffy Rice, Jay Willis	April 27, 2021
57	"Get Us to Seven feat. Rep. Mondaire Jones"	Mondaire Jones	May 4, 2021
Discussion includes the Judiciary Act of 2021, Supreme Court reform, and the Biden Commission
TBA	"Roe v. Wade: The Movie [PATREON-ONLY]"	None	May 11, 2021
58	"Jones v. Mississippi"	None	May 18, 2021
58	"Wal-Mart Stores, Inc. v. Dukes"	None	May 25, 2021
TBA	"Brett Kavanaugh [PATREON-ONLY]"	None	June 1, 2021
60	"5–4 x Even More News — Abortion Rights"	Even More News	June 8, 2021
Discusses the implications for abortion rights in the US after the Supreme Court granted certiorari to hear Dobbs v. Jackson Women's Health Organization
61	"Smith v. Maryland"	Even More News	June 15, 2021
62	"Meet Nick Wallace"	Nick Wallace	June 21, 2021
63	"Fulton v. Philadelphia"	None	June 29, 2021
TBA	"Textualism [PATREON-ONLY]"	None	June 29, 2021
64	"Cedar Point Nursery v. Hassid"	None	July 6, 2021
TBA	"Why Supreme Court Media Coverage Sucks [PATREON-ONLY]"	None	July 27, 2021
65	"Brnovich v. Democratic National Committee"	None	August 3, 2021
66	"American for Prosperity v. Bonta"	None	August 10, 2021
TBA	"Stephen Breyer [PATREON-ONLY]"	None	August 17, 2021
67	"Nestlé v. Doe"	None	August 24, 2021
68	"Welcome to Law School"	None	August 31, 2021
69	"SB8: Whole Woman's Health v. Jackson"	None	September 3, 2021
TBA	"Eviction Moratorium: A Perfect Storm of Conservative Bullshit [PATREON-ONLY]"	None	September 14, 2021
70	"Adoptive Couple v. Baby Girl"	None	September 21, 2021
71	"Nieves v. Bartlett"	None	October 5, 2021
72	"2021–2022 Supreme Court Term Preview"	Elie Mystal	October 5, 2021
TBA	"The Justices are Getting Defensive [PATREON-ONLY]"	None	October 19, 2021
73	"Younger v. Harris"	Alec Karakatsanis	October 26, 2021
74	"Hamdi v. Rumsfeld"	None	November 2, 2021
75	"'This Is A Captured Institution' – An Interview with Senator Sheldon Whitehouse"	Sheldon Whitehouse	November 9, 2021
76	"Michigan v. Environmental Protection Agency"	None	November 16, 2021
TBA	"The Failed Nomination of Robert Bork [PATREON-ONLY]"	None	November 23, 2021
77	"Town of Greece v. Galloway"	None	November 16, 2021
TBA	"The Warren Court: 5 Out of 5 Stars [PATREON-ONLY]"	None	December 14, 2021
78	"The 5–4 Giving Guide: How to Help"	None	December 24, 2021

=== 2022 ===
No.	Title	Guest	Original release date
TBA	"The Return of the Rise and Fall of Roe v. Wade, Pt. 1"	None	January 4, 2022
Rerun of episode 44.
TBA	"The Return of the Rise and Fall of Roe v. Wade, Pt. 2"	None	January 4, 2022
Rerun of episode 45.
79	"Florida v. Riley"	None	January 18, 2022
80	"NFIB v. Department of Labor"	None	January 18, 2022
TBA	"The Best Amendment (The Ninth) [PATREON-ONLY]"	None	February 1, 2022
81	"Parents Involved in Community Schools v. Seattle School District No. 1"	None	February 8, 2022
82	"Ingraham v. Wright"	None	February 15, 2022
TBA	"The Lochner Era [PATREON-ONLY]"	None	February 22, 2022
83	"Merrill v. Milligan"	None	March 1, 2022
84	"We Need to Talk About Ginni"	None	March 8, 2022
TBA	"The Civil Rights Cases of 1883 [PATREON-ONLY]"	None	March 15, 2022
85	"Strickland v. Washington"	None	March 22, 2022
86	"Lorillard v. Reilly"	None	March 29, 2022
TBA	"How the Biden SCOTUS Commission Radicalized One Law Professor [PATREON-ONLY]"	Kermit Roosevelt III	April 12, 2022
87	"Immigration and Naturalization Service v. Elias-Zacarias"	None	April 19, 2022
88	"Lassiter v. Department of Social Services"	None	April 26, 2022
89	"Dobbs v. Jackson Women's Health: The End of Roe"	None	May 4, 2022
TBA	"5–4 Live in Oakland [PATREON-ONLY]"	None	May 10, 2022
90	"United States v. Vaello Madero"	None	May 17, 2022
91	"Whren v. United States"	None	May 24, 2022
92	"Brett Kavanaugh – Unlocked Premium Episode"	None	May 31, 2022
93	"Federal Election Commission v. Ted Cruz for Senate"	None	June 7, 2022
TBA	"5–4 x Know Your Enemy: 'Overturning Roe, Part One'"	None	June 14, 2022
94	"Egbert v. Boule"	None	June 21, 2022
95	"Emergency Episode: Roe is Overturned"	None	June 25, 2022
Discusses Dobbs v. Jackson Women's Health Organization.
96	"Shinn v. Ramirez"	None	June 28, 2022
97	"Kennedy v. Bremerton School District"	None	July 12, 2022
98	"West Virginia v. Environmental Protection Agency"	None	July 19, 2022
99	"WTF Are The Dems Doing? with Jamelle Bouie"	Jamelle Bouie	July 26, 2022
100	"'We can make Roe the law everywhere' – An Interview with Senator Elizabeth Warren"	Elizabeth Warren	July 28, 2022
TBA	"Free Speech, Cancel Culture, and the Court [PATREON-ONLY]"	None	August 2, 2022
101	"Oklahoma v. Castro-Huerta"	None	August 9, 2022
102	"New York State Rifle and Pistol Association v. Bruen"	None	August 9, 2022
TBA	"Harriet Miers Gets Wrecked [PATREON-ONLY]"	None	August 23, 2022
103	"Welcome to Law School (Again)"	None	August 30, 2022
Rerun of episode 68.
104	"Vega v. Tekoh"	None	September 13, 2022
105	"Minor v. Happersett"	None	September 20, 2022
TBA	"Ketanji Brown Jackson [PATREON-ONLY]"	None	September 27, 2022
106	"2022-2023 Supreme Court Term Preview"	Hannah Mullen	October 4, 2022
107	"Tanner v. United States"	None	October 11, 2022
TBA	"Legal Discourse and Our Discontents [PATREON-ONLY]"	None	October 18, 2022
TBA	"Rhiannon Resigned and Peter Got Fired [PATREON-ONLY]"	None	October 21, 2022
108	"Independent State Legislature Theory"	None	November 1, 2022
109	"Bowers v. Hardwick"	None	November 1, 2022
TBA	"Samuel Alito [PATREON-ONLY]"	None	November 8, 2022
TBA	"Public Defenders: 'Incarceration Doesn't Make Us Safe' [PATREON-ONLY]"	None	November 11, 2022
110	"Utah v. Strieff"	None	November 15, 2022
111	"Glossip v. Gross"	None	November 22, 2022
TBA	"Sonia Sotomayor [PATREON-ONLY]"	None	December 6, 2022
112	"The Pelican Brief"	None	December 13, 2022
113	"The 2022 Five Four Giving Guide: More Ways to Help"	None	December 20, 2022
114	"5-4 Presents: If Books Could Kill - 'Outliers'"	None	December 27, 2022

=== 2023 ===
No.	Title	Guest	Original release date
115	"McDonnell v. United States"	None	January 10, 2023
116	"Giles v. Harris"	None	January 17, 2023
TBA	"Your Questions Answered"	None	January 24, 2023
Q&A session with the hosts.
117	"Korematsu v. United States"	None	January 31, 2023
118	"'Jones Day Made Trump' - Live at Harvard Law with David Enrich"	None	February 7, 2023
119	"Connick v. Thompson Encore"	None	February 14, 2023
Rerun of episode 53.
TBA	"Prosecutorial Immunity, or 'FTP' Means Prosecutors Too [PATREON-ONLY]"	None	February 21, 2023
120	"In re Gault with Josie Duffy Rice"	Josie Duffy Rice	February 28, 2023
121	"Boyle v. United Technologies Corporation"	None	March 21, 2023
122	"5-4 x Bloc Party: Michael on How the Dems Flopped on Debt Relief"	Bloc Party	March 28, 2023
123	"Cruzan v. Missouri Department of Health"	None	April 4, 2023
TBA	"Noted Segregationist William Rehnquist [PATREON-ONLY]"	None	April 11, 2023
124	"Ewing v. California"	None	April 18, 2023
TBA	"The Thomas/Crow Affair [PATREON-ONLY]"	None	April 25, 2023
125	"Palmer v. Thompson"	None	May 2, 2023
126	"The Shadow Docket with Steve Vladeck"	Steve Vladeck	May 9, 2023
127	"United States v. O'Brien"	None	May 23, 2023
TBA	"The Fall and Rise of the Death Penalty [PATREON-ONLY]"	None	May 30, 2023
128	"Sierra Club v. Morton"	None	June 6, 2023
129	"American Ship Building Company v. National Labor Relations Board"	None	June 13, 2023
130	"Protecting Trans Rights with Erin Reed [UNLOCKED]"	Erin Reed	June 22, 2023
131	"Sackett v. EPA (Sackett II)"	None	June 27, 2023
132	"303 Creative LLC v. Elenis"	None	July 4, 2023
133	"Biden v. Nebraska"	None	July 11, 2023
134	"DeShaney v. Winnebago County Department of Social Services"	None	July 18, 2023
TBA	"2022-2023 Term Reflections [PATREON-ONLY]"	None	August 1, 2023
135	"Harisiades v. Shaughnessy"	None	August 8, 2023
136	"Students for Fair Admissions v. Harvard"	None	August 15, 2023
TBA	"The Twisted Mind of Clarence Thomas [PATREON-ONLY]"	None	August 22, 2023
137	"Welcome to Law School 2023"	None	August 29, 2023
Second rerun of episode 68.
138	"United States v. Sioux Nation with Nick Estes"	Nick Estes	September 5, 2023
TBA	"Your Questions: Jury Nullification, Law School Reform, and More [PATREON-ONLY]"	None	September 12, 2023
Q&A session with the hosts.
139	"2023-2024 Term Preview with Chris Geidner"	Chris Geidner	September 20, 2023
140	"Hampton v. United States"	None	September 26, 2023
TBA	"The Southern Manifesto [PATREON-ONLY]"	None	October 3, 2023
141	"Berghuis v. Thompkins"	None	October 10, 2023
142	"Geduldig v. Aiello"	None	October 17, 2023
143	"Palestine Legal: 'The Great Difference a Movement Lawyer Can Make'"	Dylan Saba, Radhika Sainath	October 24, 2023
TBA	"Legally Blonde [PATREON-ONLY]"	None	October 31, 2023
TBA	"A Note From Rhiannon"	None	November 7, 2023
144	"Schenck v. United States"	None	November 14, 2023
145	"Richardson v. Ramirez"	None	November 21, 2023
TBA	"Abe Fortas: The Justice Who Walked So Clarence Thomas Could Run [PATREON-ONLY]"	None	November 28, 2023
146	"Glacier Northwest, Inc. v. International Brotherhood of Teamsters"	None	December 5, 2023
TBA	"Epic Fail! Constitutional Amendments That Didn't Make the Grade [PATREON-ONLY]"	None	December 12, 2023
147	"How to Lose Your Job by Supporting Palestine"	None	December 21, 2023
148	"The 5-4 Giving Guide 2023"	None	December 22, 2023

=== 2024 ===
No.	Title	Guest	Original release date
149	"The Federalist Society, part 1: Immodest Origins"	None	January 23, 2024
150	"The Federalist Society, part 2: The Debate Club"	None	January 30, 2024
151	"The Federalist Society, part 3: The Spoils"	None	February 6, 2024
TBA	"The Federalist Society, part 4: How to Fight Back [PATREON-ONLY]"	None	February 13, 2024
152	"Maryland v. Shatzer"	None	February 20, 2024
153	"Nixon v. Fitzgerald"	None	February 27, 2024
TBA	"How to Teach Constitutional Law [PATREON-ONLY]"	None	March 5, 2024
154	"Trump v. Anderson"	Jay Willis	March 4, 2024
155	"Illinois v. Caballes"	None	March 19, 2024
156	"United States v. Jones"	None	March 26, 2024
TBA	"The (Constitutional) Crisis at the Border [PATREON-ONLY]"	None	April 2, 2024
157	"Holder v. Humanitarian Law Project"	None	April 16, 2024
158	"Hans v. Louisiana"	None	April 30, 2024
159	"Maryland v. King"	None	May 21, 2024
160	"Arizona v. Navajo Nation"	None	May 28, 2024
161	"Alexander v. South Carolina State Conference of the NAACP"	None	June 18, 2024
162	"Garland v. Cargill"	None	June 25, 2024
163	"Trump v. United States"	None	July 2, 2024
164	"United States v. Rahimi"	None	July 9, 2024
165	"Snyder v. United States"	None	July 16, 2024
166	"Loper Bright Enterprises v. Raimondo"	None	July 30, 2024
167	"Grants Pass v. Johnson"	None	August 13, 2024
168	"Fischer v. United States"	None	August 20, 2024
TBA	"Biden, Harris, and the Future of Court Reform [PATREON-ONLY]"	None	August 27, 2024
169	"Welcome to Law School 2024"	None	September 3, 2024
Third rerun of episode 68.
170	"United States v. Stanley"	None	September 10, 2024
171	"Securities and Exchange Commission v. Jarkesy"	None	September 17, 2024
TBA	"The Roberts One-Step [PATREON-ONLY]"	None	September 24, 2024
172	"2024-2025 Supreme Court Term Preview"	None	October 1, 2024
173	"Mackenzie v. Hare"	None	October 8, 2024
174	"The Coming Battle Over Reproductive Rights"	None	October 22, 2024
175	"Elon Musk's War on Workers"	None	October 29, 2024
176	"First as Farce, Then as Tragedy"	Josie Duffy Rice, Jay Willis	November 12, 2024
TBA	"Small Dick Durbin Energy [PATREON-ONLY]"	None	November 26, 2024
177	"United States v. 95 Barrels of Vinegar"	None	December 3, 2024
178	"Illinois v. Wardlow"	None	December 10, 2024
TBA	"Holiday Extravaganza: Drake, TikTok, and the Clean Girls [PATREON-ONLY]"	None	December 17, 2024
179	"The 2024 5-4 Giving Guide"	None	December 24, 2024

=== 2025 ===
No.	Title	Guest	Original release date
180	"5-4 x Know Your Enemy: Trump 2.0 and the Courts"	None	January 14, 2025
181	"Murphy v. NCAA"	None	January 21, 2025
182	"TikTok v. Garland"	None	January 28, 2025
183	"Trump's Opening Salvo"	None	February 11, 2025
184	"Your Trump 2.0 Questions, Answered [UNLOCKED]"	None	February 13, 2025 (Note: Originally released as a patreon-only episode on February 3, 2025)
185	"NIFLA v. Becerra"	None	February 18, 2025
186	"McCutcheon v. FEC"	None	February 25, 2025
TBA	"The Powell Memo [PATREON-ONLY]"	None	March 11, 2025
187	"San Francisco v. EPA"	None	March 18, 2025
188	"Mobile v. Bolden"	None	March 25, 2025
TBA	"Authoritarian Creep(s) [PATREON-ONLY]"	None	April 1, 2025
189	"Department of State v. Muñoz"	None	April 8, 2025
190	"Trump v. J.G.G."	None	April 15, 2025
TBA	"Movie Review: The Firm [PATREON-ONLY]"	None	April 22, 2025
191	"United States v. Zubaydah"	None	April 29, 2025
192	"Hazelwood School District v. Kuhlmeier"	None	May 6, 2025
TBA	"No Due Process, Yes Jumbo Plane [PATREON-ONLY]"	None	May 20, 2025
193	"Jones v. North Carolina Prisoners' Labor Union"	None	May 27, 2025
TBA	"Copaganda with Alec Karakatsanis [PATREON-ONLY]"	Alec Karakatsanis	June 3, 2025
194	"Trump v. Wilcox"	None	June 10, 2025
195	"The DOGE Cases"	Jay Willis and Josie Duffy Rice	June 17, 2025
196	"United States v. Skrmetti"	None	July 1, 2025
197	"Trump v. CASA, Inc."	None	July 8, 2025
TBA	"Portrait of a John Roberts on Fire [PATREON-ONLY]"	None	July 15, 2025
196	"Mahmoud v. Taylor"	None	July 22, 2025
199	"Free Speech Coalition, Inc. v Paxton"	None	July 29, 2025
200	"Trump Brings the War Home [PATREON-ONLY]"	None	August 5, 2025
201	"McMahon v. New York"	None	August 12, 2025
202	"Medina v. Planned Parenthood South Atlantic"	None	August 26, 2025
TBA	"Step Your Pussy Up Under Fascism [PATREON-ONLY]"	None	September 2, 2025
203	"Welcome to Law School 2025"	None	September 9, 2025
Rerun of episode 68.
204	"Noem v. Vasquez Perdomo"	None	September 16, 2025
205	"2025-2026 Supreme Court Term Preview"	None	September 23, 2025
TBA	"Free Speech, Chilled to Perfection [PATREON-ONLY]"	None	October 7, 2025
206	"Department of State v. AIDS Vaccine Advocacy Coalition"	None	October 14, 2025
207	"Rhiannon Interviews Mahmoud Khalil"	Mahmoud Khalil	October 18, 2025
208	"Immigration and Naturalization Service v. Lopez-Mendoza"	None	October 21, 2025
TBA	"Panic! In The Federal Judiciary [PATREON-ONLY]"	None	October 28, 2025
209	"Garcetti v. Ceballos"	None	November 4, 2025
210	""What's at Stake is Everything": The Last Columbia Protester in ICE Detention"	Amal Thabateh and Sadaf Hasan	November 11, 2025
211	"Department of Homeland Security v. Thuraissigiam"	None	November 18, 2025
TBA	"Fire at Will: Trump's Illegal War in the Caribbean [PATREON-ONLY]"	None	November 25, 2025
212	"Trump v. Orr"	None	December 9, 2025
TBA	"Movie Review: Average Joe [PATREON-ONLY]"	None	December 16, 2025
213	"The 2025 Five Four Giving Guide: Don't Let the Fascists Keep You Down"	None	December 23, 2025

=== 2026 ===
No.	Title	Guest	Original release date
214	"The Rise and Fall of the Voting Rights Act, Part 1"	None	January 20, 2026
215	"The Rise and Fall of the Voting Rights Act, Part II"	None	January 27, 2026
TBA	"2026 Mailbag: Is Any of This Legal? [PATREON-ONLY]"	None	February 3, 2026
216	"Immigration and Naturalization Service v. Delgado"	None	February 10, 2026
217	"Pulsifer v. United States"	None	February 17, 2026
TBA	"Meet Your Attorney General, Pam Bondi [PATREON-ONLY]"	None	February 24, 2026
218	"Immigration Law in 2026: Fighting the Cruelty Machine"	None	March 3, 2026
219	"Learning Resources Inc. v. Trump"	None	March 10, 2026
TBA	"No War Is Illegal (When They All Are) [PATREON-ONLY]"	None	March 17, 2026
220	"Dames & Moore v. Regan"	None	March 24, 2026
221	"Hudson v. Michigan"	None	April 7, 2026
222	"Chiles v. Salazar"	None	April 14, 2026
TBA	"Birthrights and Birthwrongs [PATREON-ONLY]"	None	April 21, 2026
223	"The Tea: Leaks, Gossip, and More Supreme Court Drama"	None	April 28, 2026
224	"Brecht v. Abrahamson"	None	May 5, 2026
225	"Louisiana v. Callais"	None	May 7, 2026
TBA	"The People v. MrBeast [PATREON-ONLY]"	None	May 19, 2026
226	"Immigration and Naturalization Service v. Chadha"	None	May 26, 2026
227	"California v. Greenwood"	None	June 2, 2026
TBA	"Reform the Court and Your Love Life (Summer 2026 Mailbag) [PATREON-ONLY]"	None	June 9, 2026
228	"The Supreme Court v. The First Step Act"	None	June 16, 2026
Discusses two cases related to the First Step Act: Fernandez v. United States and Rutherford v. United States
229	""The Most Destructive Chief Justice of My Lifetime": Dissecting John Roberts with Lisa Graves"	Lisa Graves	June 23, 2026
230	"250 Years of Bad Decitions: SCOTUS, the Civil War, and the End of Reconstruction"	None	June 30, 2026
231	"Trump v. Barbara"	None	July 7, 2026
TBA	"The Legal Media is Still in Denial [PATREON-ONLY]"	None	July 14, 2026
232	"West Virginia v. B.P.J."	None	July 21, 2026
233	"Mullin v. Doe"	None	July 28, 2026
TBA	"Gambling Away the Future: Kalshi, SCOTUSBlog, and Trump's Bet on the Midterms [PATREON-ONLY]"	None	August 4, 2026
234	"Trump v. Slaughter (and Trump v. Cook)"	None	August 11, 2026
235	"NRSC v. FEC"	None	August 18, 2026
