= United States v. Washington (disambiguation) =

United States v. Washington, 384 F. Supp. 312 (W.D. Wash. 1974), is a court case on the fishing rights of American Indian tribes. It may also refer to:

- United States v. Washington, 596 U.S. ___ (2022)
- United States v. Washington, 431 U.S. 181 (1977)
