= Tribal court =

Judicial term

Independent Tribal Courts
- Established: Indian Reorganization Act of 1934
- Location: Various Native American tribal territories
- Composition method: Tribal judiciary
- Authorised by: Tribal sovereignty, Tribal constitutions
- Number of positions: Varies by tribe

Independent tribal courts are judicial systems that are established and operated by Native American tribes within the United States. As of 2022, there are more than 330 Tribal Courts that stem from the 570 federally recognized tribal nations. These courts are separate from the federal and state court systems and are designed to handle legal matters within the tribe's jurisdiction.

The purpose of independent tribal courts is to provide a legal framework for Native American tribes to govern themselves and to resolve disputes within their communities, without interference from the United States federal or state governments. The independent tribal court system is an important tool for tribes to maintain their own legal traditions and to resolve disputes within their communities.

Tribal courts are also important for preserving tribal sovereignty and self-determination. However, they are limited in jurisdiction and funding.

== History ==
The history of independent tribal courts is complex and has been shaped by the federal government's policies towards Native American tribes. The establishment of independent tribal courts was a result of the Indian Reorganization Act of 1934, which aimed to promote tribal self-government and to preserve Native American culture and traditions. However, the federal government's policies towards Native American tribes have been inconsistent, and the relationship between the federal government and tribal courts has been fraught with tension. Despite these challenges, independent tribal courts remain an important part of indigenous resistance to western legal and cultural influence.

=== Pre-Indian Reorganization Act of 1934 ===
Research shows that before contact with British settlers, tribal nations had contrasting conceptions of justice and community responsibility from those of the English and subsequent U.S legal jurisprudence. While English law emphasizes individual rights, many tribal nations believed in "reciprocal responsibilities." Thus, it was common for tribal nations to not have formalized “codes, rules, regulations, cases, or statutes.” However, once the U.S. government began its assimilation policies towards Indigenous people, it began to enforce its jurisprudence over tribal nations. The U.S. Bureau of Indian Affairs established the Code of Indian Offenses Courts, also known as the Code of Federal Regulation Courts (CFR Courts), which authorized U.S. Indian Agents to enforce federal law. CFR courts, with their objective to “remove savage practices," have been greatly criticized for their disregard of tribal sovereignty, and attack on cultural practices like the Scalp Dance, polygamy, and ceremonial dances. Furthermore, this system of enforced settler jurisprudence over Native nations harmed traditional justice practices in communities such as the Navajo Nation: “it imposed criminal laws and incarceration as punishment—a sanction incompatible with traditional, Navajo justice—and police and courts to enforce them.”

=== Indian Reorganization Act of 1934 ===
The Indian Reorganization Act of 1934 had a significant impact on how Native American tribal courts operate. The Act aimed to promote tribal self-government and to preserve Native American culture and traditions. It allowed tribes to establish their own governments and to adopt constitutions and bylaws. This gave tribes the power to create their own legal systems and to establish independent tribal courts. Some tribes choose not to adopt these new constitutions, such as the Navajo Nation, which as of 2022, does not use a written constitution. The Act also provided funding for tribal courts and allowed tribes to contract with the federal government for law enforcement services. As a result, independent tribal courts became an important tool for tribes to maintain their own legal traditions and to resolve disputes within their communities.

The Indian Reorganization Act of 1934 also had a broader impact on the relationship between Native American tribes and the federal government. The Act recognized the importance of tribal sovereignty and self-determination and aimed to promote these values. It allowed tribes to establish their own governments and to make decisions about their own affairs. This was a significant departure from previous federal policies, which had sought to assimilate Native Americans into mainstream American culture. The Act also provided funding for economic development and education, which helped to improve the lives of Native Americans. Overall, the Indian Reorganization Act of 1934 played a crucial role in promoting tribal sovereignty and self-determination.

=== Post-Indian Reorganization Act Policies ===
However, despite these advances towards Native sovereignty, the U.S. federal policy regarding tribal sovereignty in the second half of the century has been criticized for limiting the potential for self-determination. For instance, the Supreme Court ruled in the consequential 1978 Oliphant v. Suquamish case that tribal courts did not have jurisdiction to criminally prosecute non-native people who committed crimes on tribal land against Native people. This interference from the federal and state government to review and limit tribal jurisdiction is an example of the plenary power doctrine, the ability for the government to have “complete and exclusive authority,” within constitutional bounds. Scholar Angelique EagleWoman criticizes this doctrine as it applies to Indigenous sovereignty arguing the two main federal statutes that are often invoked by the government are not, "authorized by the U.S. constitution or consented to by the Tribal Nations."

== Court Structure ==
Many Tribal Courts are designed in a similar fashion to a state or federal court, and have increasingly expanded in jurisdiction and capacity. However structure and jurisdiction vary greatly across courts, for instance, some Tribes have more traditional justice systems such as the peacekeeping Courts of the Navajo Nation. The Indian Civil Rights Act of 1968 (ICRA) during the creation of tribal courts encouraged tribes to adopt a Bill of Rights that is similar to the U.S.’s bill of rights. However, there were differences as “Native courts were not “required to convene a jury in civil trials or criminal cases, to issue grand jury indictments, or appoint counsel for poor defendants.” Furthermore, there are three main kinds of Tribal Appellate Courts. They can either function as an individual entity, a body part of a larger regional system, or a court adjudicated by the tribal council rather than judges.

== Funding ==
Native American tribal courts receive funding from various sources, including tribal, state, and federal funding. Tribal funding is the primary source of funding for tribal courts, and it is often used to cover the costs of court operations, salaries for judges and court staff, and other related expenses. State funding is another source of funding for tribal courts, and it is often used to support court operations and to provide training and technical assistance to tribal court personnel. Federal funding is also available for tribal courts, and it is often used to support court operations, provide training and technical assistance, and to fund specific programs and initiatives.

Under Title 25 US Code 3601, the federal government provides funding for tribal courts through the Indian Tribal Justice Support program. This program provides funding for tribal courts to improve their operations, provide training and technical assistance, and to fund specific programs and initiatives. The program is designed to support the development of effective and efficient tribal justice systems that are consistent with tribal traditions and values. The program also provides funding for tribal courts to address issues related to domestic violence, child abuse, and other crimes that are prevalent in Indian country. Overall, the funding sources for Native American tribal courts are diverse and are designed to support the development of effective and efficient tribal justice systems that are consistent with tribal traditions and values.

=== Bureau of Indian Affairs Tribal Priority Allocations (TPA) ===
TPA provide federal funding for Tribal courts through a collection of programs. For example, in 2018, $28,698,000 was granted to tribal governments through TPA programs. Although TPA funds allow tribal governments to operate more effectively, the programs have long been criticized for not allocating adequate funds to the tribes most in need of federal support.

== Jurisdiction ==
=== Tribal Jurisdiction ===
Native American tribal courts have jurisdiction over a wide range of cases that occur within their respective tribes' territories. Tribal courts have the authority to hear both civil and criminal cases, including disputes over property, contracts, and family law matters such as child custody and adoption. Tribal courts also have jurisdiction over criminal offenses committed by Native Americans within their territories, including offenses related to drugs, alcohol, and domestic violence. 21st century legislation has increased tribal jurisdiction, however a tribal court’s authority depends on the backgrounds of the parties involved, involving different privileges if the conflict is between two Native tribe members, a tribe member and non-tribe member, with additional exceptions depending on the gender of the two parties, and the severity of the crimes.

=== Limits to Tribal Court Jurisdiction ===
==== Federal and State Jurisdiction over Native Americans ====
Cases that involve non-Native Americans are typically referred to state or federal courts. The Major Crimes Act of 1885 gives the federal government jurisdiction over certain major crimes committed by Native Americans on tribal lands, including murder, manslaughter, and kidnapping. While Tribal Courts also have jurisdiction in some cases, the Indian Civil Rights Act limits the sentencing authority of tribal courts with only a few exceptions, resulting in cases often being heard by federal courts instead. For some Public Law 280 states such as Alaska, California, Minnesota, Nebraska, Oregon, and Wisconsin, state courts have criminal jurisdiction over crimes committed by Native Americans on Native lands that lie within state boundaries. While some legal scholars view federal and state jurisdiction as necessary, derived from the treaties that incorporated Indian land into the U.S., others see federal interference as a limitation to tribal sovereignty and a hindrance to criminal justice, as jurisdictional issues can prolong the justice process, some even citing federal involvement as a form of neocolonialism.

==== Federal and State Jurisdiction of non-Native Americans on Tribal Land ====
Tribal courts typically do not have jurisdiction over non-Native Americans who commit crimes within tribal territories, except in limited circumstances. Prior to the 2022 Castro Huerta ruling, the federal government had criminal jurisdiction. Post this ruling, tribal courts, states, and the federal government all have concurrent jurisdiction.Cases that involve non-Native Americans are typically referred to state or federal courts. As of 2025, it's unclear whether tribal courts have jurisdiction to issue warrants for Non-Tribal Entities (NTEs) on tribal land. Furthermore, the state has jurisdiction over crimes involving two non-Native people, even when committed on tribal land. This displacement of legal power from the tribal to the state level has been critiqued by scholars and activists as one of the primary pieces of legislation that result in “the tribes [holding] no power over a large number of people who live in Indian Country, which can lead to a reservation feeling less like a sovereign home, and potentially allow violence or criminal activity to fester in their community.”

This powerlessness is due to a long and inconsistent history of U.S. government policy towards Native people and land, that many times viewed Native nations as a “third sovereign” rather than an incorporated state. The Indian Civil Rights Act of 1968 also allows for the federal government to prosecute non-Native Americans who commit crimes against Native Americans on tribal lands. In addition, some states have entered into agreements with tribes to allow for state jurisdiction over certain crimes committed by non-Native Americans within tribal territories. Scholar Angelique EagleWoman criticizes state jurisdiction, arguing that "When state forums hear civil cases arising within tribal lands, it is to the detriment of tribal courts and their ability to develop tribal law for civil causes of action." In yet, the 2022 Castro-Huerta Supreme Court decision has upheld this concurrent jurisdiction. Some scholars have argued that the multiple jurisdictions, "provide opportunity for a perpetrator to fall through the cracks as state and federal government can decline a referral. Meanwhile tribal systems are limited in their punishment options."

=== Interaction with the state and federal court system ===
==== Title 25 United States Code 3601 ====
Title 25 was a congressional procedure passed in 2010 to provide federal support and protections for tribal courts. The declaration officially established:

- "there is a government-to-government relationship between the United States and each Indian tribe;
- the United States has a trust responsibility to each tribal government that includes the protection of the sovereignty of each tribal government;
- Congress, through statutes, treaties, and the exercise of administrative authorities, has recognized the self-determination, self-reliance, and inherent sovereignty of Indian tribes;
- Indian tribes possess the inherent authority to establish their own form of government, including tribal justice systems;
- tribal justice systems are an essential part of tribal governments and serve as important forums for ensuring public health and safety and the political integrity of tribal governments;
- Congress and the Federal courts have repeatedly recognized tribal justice systems as the appropriate forums for the adjudication of disputes affecting personal and property rights;
- traditional tribal justice practices are essential to the maintenance of the culture and identity of Indian tribes and to the goals of this chapter;
- tribal justice systems are inadequately funded, and the lack of adequate funding impairs their operation; and
- tribal government involvement in and commitment to improving tribal justice systems is essential to the accomplishment of the goals of this chapter."

=== Denezpi v. United States ===
In 2022, the Supreme Court ruled in Denezpi v. United States that the Double Jeopardy clause of the Bill of Rights does not bar successive prosecutions of distinct offenses arising from a single act, if the case is heard in both a tribal and federal court under the dual sovereignty principle.

== Sentencing authority ==
The sentencing process in Native American tribal courts varies depending on the tribe and the nature of the case. In general, tribal courts aim to incorporate traditional tribal values and customs into their sentencing practices. This may involve a focus on rehabilitation and restoration rather than punishment. Sentences may include community service, restitution, or participation in traditional healing ceremonies. For instance, the Navajo Nation Peacekeeper Court emphasizes communal justice rather than adversarial justice. Therefore, there are no plaintiffs or defendants involved in settlements. Instead, the resolution process may include prayers, group discussions, teachings by the peacemaker, or a closing meal. For example, former Peacemaker advocates Philmer Blue House and James W. Zion explain that a Navajo land dispute may be settled in part through a peacemaker narrative. They give an example of an allegorical story that follows two pre-human figures, Lightning and Horned Toad, through which many Navajo community members understand rights to land and property, and which is used as a source and framework for contemporary legal procedure. In the story, Horned Toad says to Lightning, “This armor was given to me by the same source as your bolts of lightning. Why is it we are arguing over the land, which was also loaned to us?”

Scholars note that the Navajo Peacemaking practices often resemble Western conceptions of restorative justice. However, there are key differences. For instance, Navajo peacemakers, who might be read as the analog of a U.S. federal judge, are not considered completely neutral like judicial American mediators. Instead, they have the responsibility to teach offenders why they have “fallen out of harmony by distance from Navajo values.” Outside of the Navajo Nation, more and more tribes are incorporating restorative justice, such as the Prairie Potawatomi Nation’s Peacemakers Circle.

Tribal courts have limited sentencing power compared to state and federal courts. Before 2010, the maximum sentence a tribal court could issue for any person was a year. The 2010 Tribal Law and Order Act has made some progress in terms of Native sentencing authority, and permits longer sentences, the maximum now three years under certain conditions. Legal scholars have argued that this is a result of growing awareness of the limitations of federal sovereignty over Native nations, especially in the role that tribal courts have in ending violence against Native women. One scholar notes that, “an increase in incarceration time may be helpful, not because enforcing long punishments is inherently a good thing, but because it will allow the tribes to implement the systems that protect their Native women.”

In some cases, tribal courts may also work with state or federal courts to develop joint sentencing agreements. These agreements allow for the coordination of sentencing between tribal and non-tribal courts and can help to ensure that sentences are consistent and fair. Overall, the sentencing process in Native American tribal courts aims to respect the unique cultural and legal traditions of each tribe and to promote the well-being of the community as a whole.

=== Tribal Law and Order Act of 2010 ===
The Tribal Law and Order Act of 2010 is a federal law, signed by President Obama, that was enacted to address the issue of crime and violence in Native American communities. According to data collected by the National Institute of Justice in 2016, 97 percent of American Indian and Alaskan Native American women who reported experiences with violence were victimized by a non-native person.

To address this large-scale violence, this Act aimed to improve public safety in Indian country by increasing the authority of tribal courts and law enforcement agencies. It provides funding for tribal courts and law enforcement agencies, and it allows tribes to exercise greater control over their own justice systems. The Act also includes provisions to improve coordination between tribal, state, and federal law enforcement agencies, and it provides for the appointment of special prosecutors to handle cases involving violence against Native American women.

=== The Violence Against Women Act ===
The Violence Against Women Act (VAWA) has gone through many iterations since the 1990s. The 2013 law renewed and updated the original 1994 law, which did not have any expansion of tribal jurisdiction. However, the 2013 act expanded the jurisdiction of tribal courts, including domestic violence clauses such as serious crimes committed by non-Native men against Native community members if certain requirements are met. These crimes include: an assault on a tribal justice member, violence against a child, violence against a dating partner, domestic violence, obstruction of justice, sexual violence, sex trafficking, stalking, or violation of a protection order. Even so, while the VAWA ensures that tribal courts have at least partial jurisdiction over these crimes, state and federal courts retain their jurisdiction as well. As some scholars note, this may cause confusion and challenges over which entity has jurisdiction. In 2019, the law was terminated and no longer applicable to cases of violence against Native people. However, in 2022 under political pressure, President Biden reauthorized the act, while expanding its jurisdiction to include other crimes as well. As a result, there have been other acts, such as the Not Invisible Act, that aim to combat the Missing and Murdered Indigenous Persons crisis.

Despite action from Congress and Tribal communities, domestic violence is a persisting issue. One key reason for this is the complicated jurisdictional process that often fails in attempts to carry out justice, and ultimately often allows people to harm Native women and get away with it. The messiness of competing jurisdictional authorities over gender based violence cases means that the “an abducted Native American person would already be disadvantaged, because the first hours of an investigation would have to be spent on understanding who has jurisdiction or attempting to ascertain the tribal affiliation of the perpetrator.” To address the root causes of this violence, some legal scholars propose ending concurrent jurisdiction, so that tribal courts are automatically able to investigate and prosecute perpetrators without interference from state or federal level courts. This switch would entail systemic change, namely better funding allocations to tribal courts.

== See also ==
- Lower court
- Appellate court
- Supreme court
- Tribal sovereignty in the United States
- Indigenous peoples of the Americas
- Indian Reorganization Act
- List of national legal systems
- Native Americans in the United States
- Native American civil rights
