= Shoop v. Twyford =

- Supreme Court of the United States

Argued April 26, 2022 Decided June 21, 2022
- Full case name: Tim Shoop, Warden v. Raymond A. Twyford, III
- Docket no.: 21-511
- Citations: 596 U.S. 811 (more)
- Argument: Oral argument

Holding
- A transportation order that allows a prisoner to search for new evidence is not "necessary or appropriate in aid of" a federal court's adjudication of a habeas corpus action when the prisoner has not shown that the desired evidence would be admissible in connection with a particular claim for relief.

Court membership
- Chief Justice John Roberts Associate Justices Clarence Thomas · Stephen Breyer; Samuel Alito · Sonia Sotomayor; Elena Kagan · Neil Gorsuch; Brett Kavanaugh · Amy Coney Barrett

Case opinions
- Majority: Roberts, joined by Thomas, Alito, Kavanaugh, Barrett
- Dissent: Breyer, joined by Sotomayor, Kagan
- Dissent: Gorsuch

Laws applied
- All Writs Act; Antiterrorism and Effective Death Penalty Act of 1996

Shoop v. Twyford, 596 U.S. 811 (2022), was a United States Supreme Court case related to death row inmates' habeas corpus petitions.

== Background ==
In the fall of 1992, Raymond A. Twyford, III (born October 15, 1962), and accomplice Daniel Eikelberry (born December 23, 1973), murdered 37-year-old Richard Franks in Jefferson County, Ohio. Franks was accused of sexually assaulting an 18-year-old girl and a 13-year-old girl. Both girls were the daughters of a woman Twyford lived with. In September 1992, Twyford and Eikelberry lured Franks to a remote spot under the premise of a hunting trip, where he was murdered. Franks was shot multiple times in the head, and his hands were cut off to deter police from identifying the body. Police found a 1992 calendar diary in Franks' pocket and were able to identify him. A short time later, Eikelberry was arrested and confessed to the crime. Twyford was also captured shortly afterward. Both suspects supposedly showed no remorse for the crime. Twyford was convicted and sentenced to death soon thereafter. Eikelberry was sentenced to life in prison and is eligible for parole in 2032.

In 2019, Twyford sought a compelling order from Ohio to transport him to the Ohio State University Wexner Medical Center for neurological testing, which he asserted might help him challenge his death sentence. The district court granted the request, and the United States Court of Appeals for the Sixth Circuit affirmed, over the dissent of Judge Alice Batchelder. The warden filed a petition for a writ of certiorari. In 2026, Twyford died on death row at the age of 63.

== Supreme Court ==
Certiorari was granted in the case on January 14, 2022. Oral arguments were heard on April 26, 2022, and the case was decided on June 21, 2022.

In a 5-4 ruling, the Supreme Court held that a transportation order that allows a prisoner to search for exonerating evidence is not guaranteed unless the prisoner shows that the desired evidence would be admissible in court in connection with a particular claim for relief. It reversed the decision by the lower court.

=== Opinion of the Court ===
Chief Justice John Roberts wrote for the majority of the court, stating that the power of the federal court to grant habeas corpus is largely restricted by the Antiterrorism and Effective Death Penalty Act of 1996, which states that writ for habeas corpus is solely because the imprisonment has "violated the Constitution of the United States or any treaties of the United States." Therefore, the power of a habeas court to develop and consider new evidence is also restricted. The court contends that the All Writs Act is the "vehicle" to gather new evidence but also points towards Shinn v. Ramirez as the reason why prisoners should be denied habeas when new evidence found is not "admissible in connection with a particular claim for relief."

=== Dissents ===
==== Justice Breyer's dissent ====
In his dissent, which Justices Sotomayor and Kagan joined, Justice Stephen Breyer wrote that he would not consider the merits of this case due to his belief that the court of appeals lacked the "jurisdiction to hear the State's interlocutory appeal." He admitted that courts of appeals have the jurisdiction to review "final decisions of the district courts," but they do not tend to hear interlocutory appeals, an appeal in which a certain part of the ruling is disputed. At the same time, the general case is still ongoing. He stated that hearing "too many" interlocutory appeals would add delays to the judicial system.

Additionally, he wrote that the court's extension of the collateral order doctrine to include "transportation orders" would resolve the question between state sovereignty and the merit of the prisoner's claim for a few reasons. (1) Transportation orders do not seem to be "especially important," (2) the court "overstates" the impact of "transportation orders" on state sovereignty, (3) some interlocutory appeals are unwise to use of the courts' time.

==== Justice Gorsuch's dissent ====
In his solo, one-page dissent, Justice Neil Gorsuch wrote that he would have dismissed the case as improvidently granted. He stated that "jurisdictional defects" would prevent the court from answering the questions presented.
