= For Keeps =

For Keeps may refer to:

- For Keeps (album), an album by The Field Mice
- For Keeps (film), a 1988 film starring Randall Batinkoff and Molly Ringwald
- For Keeps, a bookstore in Atlanta, Georgia
- For Keeps, a 1944 Broadway play by F. Hugh Herbert
- For Keeps, a 1994 book by film critic Pauline Kael
- "For Keeps", a song by Quavo
- "For Keeps", a song by Gossip
- "For Keeps", a song by Preston Pablo
- "For Keeps", a song by JID from God Does Like Ugly
