= Amir Ali (judge) =

American judge (born 1985)

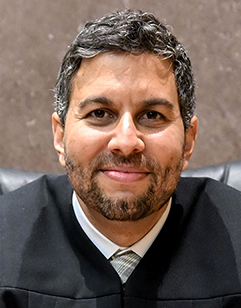

Judge of the United States District Court for the District of Columbia
- Incumbent
- Assumed office November 22, 2024
- Appointed by: Joe Biden
- Preceded by: Beryl Howell

Personal details
- Born: Amir Hatem Mahdy Ali; 1985 (age 40–41) Kingston, Ontario, Canada
- Education: University of Waterloo (BSE); Harvard University (JD)

Amir Hatem Mahdy Ali (born 1985) is an American lawyer and jurist who serves as a United States district judge of the United States District Court for the District of Columbia. Before joining the federal judiciary in 2024, he worked as a civil rights attorney and a professor of U.S. constitutional law at Harvard Law School.

As an attorney, Ali argued several cases before the Supreme Court of the United States involving government accountability and criminal procedure. His advocacy contributed to rulings on the constitutional right to counsel, protections for people with intellectual disabilities, and remedies for wrongful prosecution. As a federal judge, he has issued opinions on U.S. constitutional law, including separation of powers, due process, free speech, and the rights of people with disabilities.

== Early life and education ==
Ali was born in Kingston, Ontario, Canada. He received a Bachelor of Software Engineering from the University of Waterloo in Ontario, Canada, in 2008 and a Juris Doctor, magna cum laude, from Harvard Law School in 2011.

== Legal career ==
After graduating, Ali served as a law clerk for Judge Raymond C. Fisher of the United States Court of Appeals for the Ninth Circuit from 2011 to 2012 and for Justice Marshall Rothstein of the Supreme Court of Canada from 2012 to 2013. From 2013 to 2017, Ali practiced at the law firm Jenner & Block, where he argued and won a case before the U.S. Supreme Court as a fifth-year associate.

In 2017, Ali established the Washington, D.C. office of the MacArthur Justice Center, where he litigated civil-rights cases. The office became a regular participant in civil rights cases at the U.S. Supreme Court, staffed by several former U.S. Supreme Court law clerks and sending public interest fellows to clerk for Supreme Court justices. From 2021 to 2024, Ali served as the MacArthur Justice Center's executive director.

From 2018 to 2024, Ali was a professor at Harvard Law School, where he directed the school's criminal justice appellate clinic. Ali was also previously an adjunct professor of litigation and constitutional law at the University of District of Columbia David A. Clarke School of Law and Georgetown University Law Center. He served on the Appellate Project's board of directors.

=== Notable cases as an attorney ===
Welch v. United States (2016)

In Welch v. United States (2016), Ali successfully argued before the Supreme Court, resulting in a 7–1 opinion that the Supreme Court's determination in Johnson v. United States, which found the Residual Clause of the Armed Career Criminal Act was unconstitutionally vague, applied retroactively on collateral review. The decision expanded access to habeas corpus in federal court, increasing the total number of cases against the United States in the following year by 55%, according to the Chief Justice of the United States's end-year report.

Williams v. Louisiana (2017)

In 2017, Ali represented Corey Williams, a Louisiana prisoner, who had been wrongfully convicted of capital murder at age sixteen and spent over 20 years at Angola Penitentiary. Ali filed a certiorari petition on Williams's behalf, which received the support of a bipartisan group of more than 40 former high-level Justice Department and law enforcement officials to support his release. In response, the district attorney agreed to immediately release Williams, before the Supreme Court could rule on the case.

Garza v. Idaho (2019)

In Garza v. Idaho (2019), Ali argued in the U.S. Supreme Court for a criminal defendant whose lawyer had failed to file a notice of appeal because his client had signed an appeal waiver. The Supreme Court ruled that the defendant could pursue an ineffective assistance claim and was entitled to a presumption of prejudice, even when the defendant had waived the right to appeal.

Thompson v. Clark (2022)

In Thompson v. Clark (2022), Ali represented a man who had been falsely charged with a crime and had brought a suit for malicious prosecution after the charges against him were dismissed. In a 6-3 opinion written by Justice Brett Kavanaugh, the Supreme Court held this claim could proceed, recognizing a federal cause of action against government actors who pursue false charges.

== Federal judicial service ==
On January 10, 2024, President Joe Biden announced his intent to nominate Ali to serve as a United States district judge for the United States District Court for the District of Columbia. On February 1, Biden nominated Ali to a seat vacated by Judge Beryl Howell, who assumed senior status.

On February 8, a hearing on his nomination was held before the Senate Judiciary Committee. In advance of the hearing, Ali received letters of support from prosecutors, the Cato Institute, and civil rights and law enforcement organizations. During his hearing, Senator Lindsey Graham asked Ali about comments another employee of the MacArthur Justice Center made about the future of police departments. Ali said the comments predated his leadership of the organization and that he did not support abolishing or defunding law enforcement. On March 7, Ali's nomination was reported out of committee by an 11–10 party-line vote. On November 20, the United States Senate invoked cloture on his nomination by a 50–48 vote. Later that day, his nomination was confirmed by a 50–49 vote, with all Democratic senators and Independent senator Joe Manchin voting yes. Ali received his judicial commission on November 22, 2024. Ali is the first Muslim American and the first Arab American to sit as a federal district judge on the U.S. District Court for the District of Columbia.

=== Notable rulings ===
==== AIDS Vaccine Advocacy Coalition v. Department of State and Global Health Council v. Trump ====
In AIDS Vaccine Advocacy Coalition v. Department of State (2025), Ali issued a temporary restraining order restricting implementation of Executive Order 14169, which would have suspended foreign assistance funding by USAID and the U.S. Department of State. Ali's order prohibited the government from suspending foreign aid payments under existing agreements. Ali found that the government had not adequately explained its blanket suspension of congressionally appropriated foreign aid, raising concerns under the Administrative Procedure Act. He ordered the government to report on its compliance by February 18.

After payments did not resume, the plaintiffs asked Ali to enforce the order and hold the government in contempt. At a hearing, Department of Justice attorney Indraneel Sur said he was "not in a position" to provide information about the administration's compliance. Ali subsequently ordered the government to pay outstanding amounts for work completed before the temporary restraining order by February 26. The administration appealed Ali's court order to both the D.C. Circuit Court of Appeals and the U.S. Supreme Court, seeking to suspend the order. The D.C. Circuit Court of Appeals dismissed the government's appeal. The Supreme Court temporarily stayed Ali's order on on February 26, but on March 5, 2025, it vacated the stay and denied the government's application, allowing Ali's order to take effect. The Court left it to Ali to clarify the government's obligations under the temporary restraining order. According to one study, Ali's temporary restraining order is the only one the Supreme Court upheld in the first six months of the second Trump administration.

On March 6, Ali ordered the government to make payments for completed work by March 10.

On March 10, Ali granted the plaintiffs' motion for a preliminary injunction in part, restricting the government's suspension of foreign assistance funding. On September 3, Ali issued a further preliminary injunction requiring the government to obligate approximately $10.5 billion in appropriated foreign aid funds. The government did not appeal the majority of Ali's order, but applied to the Supreme Court for a stay pending appeal as to $4 billion in funds that had been proposed to Congress for rescission. The Supreme Court granted the stay. After obtaining the stay and allowing the expiration date for the funding to pass, the government voluntarily dismissed its appeals before the D.C. Circuit or Supreme Court could decide the merits of the issue.

==== National Association of the Deaf v. Trump ====
In November 2025, in National Association of the Deaf v. Trump, Ali issued a preliminary injunction requiring the White House to restore live American Sign Language (ASL) interpretation during presidential and press‑secretary briefings. He concluded that the refusal to offer ASL access likely violated the Rehabilitation Act of 1973. Ali stressed that ASL and written English are distinct languages and that captions alone do not furnish meaningful access for many deaf Americans. The administration has appealed the decision to the D.C. Circuit, arguing that requiring the president to appear alongside ASL interpretation "would severely intrude on the President's prerogative to control the image he presents to the public". Ali had rejected this argument, writing: "To the extent the defendants argue that they prefer to act free from association with accessibility for people with disabilities, their gripe is with Congress and federal anti-discrimination laws." The administration's position to remove ASL has also been criticized, including by Joe Rogan, who called it "crazy". Since Ali's order, the White House has maintained a YouTube channel that provides live ASL for all presidential and press-secretary briefings. The administration's appeal remains pending.

==== American Gateways v. Department of Justice ====
In American Gateways v. Department of Justice (2025), Ali granted a preliminary injunction requiring the government to reinstate the National Qualified Representative Program, which since 2013 had allowed immigration judges to appoint government-funded counsel for detained noncitizens found mentally incompetent to represent themselves in immigration proceedings. The Justice Department had abruptly terminated the program's funding earlier that year, prompting a suit by nine nonprofit legal service providers. Ali held that the termination was arbitrary and capricious under the Administrative Procedure Act, citing the irreparable harm when people found mentally incompetent are stripped of their representation. Under the injunction, the court later remanded the matter to the Justice Department's immigration agency while keeping the program in effect. The injunction was not appealed.

==== Mark Zaid v. Trump ====
In December 2025, in Zaid v. Trump, Ali rendered a preliminary injunction reinstating attorney Mark Zaid's security clearance after the administration revoked it as retaliation. The order held that the summary revocation violated the First Amendment right to free expression and the Fifth Amendment rights to due process and the right of counsel, because it was made in retribution for Zaid's legal representation of government whistleblowers.

== Personal life ==
Ali became a naturalized U.S. citizen in a special ceremony at the National Archives in front of the original U.S. Constitution and Declaration of Independence.

Legal offices
Preceded by Beryl Howell	Judge of the United States District Court for the District of Columbia; 2024–present	Incumbent
