= William Consovoy =

American attorney (1974–2023)

- Born: William Spencer Consovoy; August 31, 1974; Plainfield, New Jersey, U.S.
- Died: January 9, 2023 (aged 48); Falls Church, Virginia, U.S.
- Education: Monmouth University; George Mason University School of Law
- Occupation: Attorney
- Political party: Republican
- Spouse: Masa Anisic (m. 2020; died 2021)

William Spencer Consovoy (August 31, 1974 – January 9, 2023) was an American attorney known for his advocacy for conservative causes. He helped found the law firm Consovoy McCarthy PLLC.

== Early life and education ==
William Spencer Consovoy was born on August 31, 1974, in Plainfield, New Jersey, and was raised in Florham Park. His family was involved in Republican Party politics: his grandfather, George Consovoy, was a mayor in central New Jersey, while his father, Andrew Consovoy, was a campaign aide to Thomas H. Kean and was appointed to the state's parole board after Kean was elected governor in 1981. Consovoy attended Monmouth University and then worked for the state parole agency. He later enrolled at the law school of George Mason University; while he initially intended to work in the field of sports law, that changed after his experience at George Mason, which The New York Times described as "transformative".

== Career ==
Consovoy clerked for Judge Edith Jones of the U.S. Court of Appeals for the Fifth Circuit and subsequently joined the Wiley Rein law firm, where he worked with several former clerks of U.S. Supreme Court justice Clarence Thomas. They recommended Consovoy to the justice, and the former clerked for the latter, whom he later described "as my hero". In 2009, Consovoy returned to Wiley Rein, where he worked with Bert Rein (the founder of the firm) and Edward Blum (a conservative activist) on Supreme Court cases such as Fisher v. University of Texas, involving affirmative action, and Shelby County v. Holder, the case which effectively invalidated elements of the Voting Rights Act. He and Tom McCarthy, another George Mason alumnus, then started their own law firm, Consovoy McCarthy; the firm worked with Blum to sue Harvard University and the University of North Carolina over their affirmative action policies. A 2020 New York Times article described the firm's "sprawling menu of wedge-issue litigation", which included defending Georgia's heartbeat law, representing Kansas in its efforts to deprive Planned Parenthood of Medicaid funding, and supporting an Alabama attempt to prevent the revival of the Equal Rights Amendment.

Consovoy represented President Donald Trump in his efforts to shield his tax returns from Congressional committees and in lawsuits involving the Emoluments Clause. In one tax-returns case, he argued that while in office, Trump could not be prosecuted even if he shot someone on Fifth Avenue. In 2020, his firm fought against California's efforts to send all voters absentee ballots, extensions to Wisconsin's mail-in voting deadline, and felon re-enfranchisement in Florida. The New York Times described Consovoy as "a Trump lawyer who mixes Jersey guy affability with an affinity for some of the most divisive culture-wars legal disputes"; The Washington Post called him "[a]n outside-the-box thinker with a big imagination". Neal Katyal, who served as acting solicitor general during the Obama administration, described him as "one of the greatest lawyers of our generation".

Consovoy was a member of the Federalist Society.

== Personal life and death ==
Consovoy married Masa Anisic in 2020. She died in April 2021 following a brief battle with cancer.

McCarthy told CNN in October 2022 that Consovoy was being treated for brain cancer, with which he had been diagnosed about two years earlier, and that he would not be participating in that month's Supreme Court arguments involving Harvard's and the University of North Carolina's affirmative action policies. He died on January 9, 2023, at age 48.

== See also ==
- List of people with brain tumors
