= Siegel v. Fitzgerald =

- Supreme Court of the United States

Argued April 18, 2022 Decided June 6, 2022
- Full case name: Alfred H. Siegel, Trustee of the Circuit City Stores, Inc. Liquidating Trust v. John P. Fitzgerald, III, Acting United States Trustee for Region 4
- Docket no.: 21-441
- Citations: 596 U.S. 464 (more)
- Argument: Oral argument

Holding
- Congress's enactment of a significant fee increase that exempted debtors in two states violated the uniformity requirement of the Bankruptcy Clause.

Court membership
- Chief Justice John Roberts Associate Justices Clarence Thomas · Stephen Breyer; Samuel Alito · Sonia Sotomayor; Elena Kagan · Neil Gorsuch; Brett Kavanaugh · Amy Coney Barrett

Case opinion
- Majority: Sotomayor, joined by unanimous

Laws applied
- Bankruptcy Judgeship Act of 2017

Siegel v. Fitzgerald, 596 U.S. 464 (2022), was a United States Supreme Court case in which the court held that Congress's enactment of a significant fee increase that exempted debtors in two states violated the uniformity requirement of the Bankruptcy Clause.

== Background ==
Congress created the United States Trustee Program in the 1980s to transfer administrative functions of the bankruptcy courts to the executive branch. When it did so, Alabama and North Carolina were provided exemptions, remaining under the bankruptcy administrator program instead. Chapter 11 debtors in Trustee Program courts pay quarterly fees throughout the duration of their case, while debtors in administrator states were exempt until 2001, when the Judicial Conference of the United States issued a standing order making the fees the same rates in both systems. In 2017, the Trustee Fund faced a shortfall in funds, so Congress passed the Bankruptcy Judgeship Act of 2017, increasing fees dramatically in Trustee Program districts. The Judicial Conference extended the hike to administrator program districts, but only for new cases. Circuit City filed for bankruptcy in 2008, in a Trustee Program district, and saw its fees dramatically increase due to the hike. It challenged the increase as violating the uniformity requirement of the United States Constitution's Bankruptcy Clause. The bankruptcy court agreed, but the United States Court of Appeals for the Fourth Circuit reversed, over the dissent of Judge A. Marvin Quattlebaum Jr.

The Supreme Court granted certiorari on January 10, 2022.

== Supreme Court ==
Oral arguments were held on April 18, 2022. On June 6, 2022, the Supreme Court issued a unanimous opinion reversing the Fourth Circuit. The court held that Congress's enactment of a significant fee increase that exempted debtors in two states violated the uniformity requirement of the Bankruptcy Clause. However, the court remanded the case for consideration of what the remedy should be.

In 2024, the Supreme Court decided what the remedy should be in Office of the United States Trustee v. John Q. Hammons Fall 2006, LLC.
