= Boechler v. Commissioner =

- Supreme Court of the United States

Argued January 12, 2022 Decided April 21, 2022
- Full case name: Boechler, P.C. v. Commissioner of Internal Revenue
- Docket no.: 20-1472
- Citations: 596 U.S. 199 (more)
- Argument: Oral argument

Holding
- Section 6330(d)(1)'s 30-day time limit to file a petition for review of a collection due process determination is a non-jurisdictional deadline subject to equitable tolling.

Court membership
- Chief Justice John Roberts Associate Justices Clarence Thomas · Stephen Breyer; Samuel Alito · Sonia Sotomayor; Elena Kagan · Neil Gorsuch; Brett Kavanaugh · Amy Coney Barrett

Case opinion
- Majority: Barrett, joined by unanimous

Laws applied
- 26 U.S.C. § 6330(d)

Boechler v. Commissioner, 596 U.S. 199 (2022), was a United States Supreme Court case related to Title 26 of the United States Code (a.k.a. Internal Revenue Code) and equitable tolling. It is regarding the statutory interpretation of 26 U.S.C. § 6330(c) and whether the tax court would have jurisdiction over petitions to the tax court if the petition exceeded the 30 days time frame.

In a unanimous decision by the court, they ruled that 30 day timeline is non-jurisdictional and is protected by equitable tolling.

== Background ==
On June 5, 2015, the Internal Revenue Services (IRS), sent a letter to Boechler, P.C. after noting a discrepancy with their prior submission of tax documents. Boechler, a North Dakota law firm, ignored the letter sent by the IRS, which led to them being imposed a 10% intentional disregard penalty. Similarly, Boechler did not pay the penalty. The IRS informed Boechler of their intent to levy, in which Boechler responded but did not establish reasonable grounds for relief.

The Independent Office of Appeals, the only method to settle a tax dispute without tax litigation in court, sustained the levy and sent Boechler the notice of determination on July 28, 2017. The notice of determination was received by Boechler on July 31, 2017, but it stated that they had to submit a petition for a Collection Due Process (CDP) hearing within 30 days (by August 28, 2017).

On August 29, Boechler submitted their petition for a CDP hearing, a day after the stated 30-day deadline. The IRS argued in the United States Tax Court that the court lacked jurisdiction to hear the case and requested the court to dismiss the case. The Tax Court agreed and dismissed the petition.

Boechler appealed this decision to the United States Court of Appeals for the Eighth Circuit arguing that the 30-day time limit is not jurisdictional, should be covered by equitable tolling, and to calculate the time limit from the issuance of the levy instead of the date of receiving the levy is in violation of due process.

In a 3-0 decision, the Eighth Circuit affirmed the Tax Court's decision and reiterated that the Tax Court has no jurisdiction for untimely petitions for review.

Boechler filed a petition for writ of certiorari to the Supreme Court of the United States.

== Supreme Court ==
The court granted certiorari on September 30, 2021, and heard oral arguments on January 12, 2022. On April 21, 2022, the Supreme Court reversed and remanded the lower court judgements in a unanimous opinion by Justice Amy Coney Barrett.

In her opinion, Justice Barrett wrote how the phrase "such matters", held in parentheses in 26 U.S.C. § 6330(c), represents the Tax Court having jurisdiction over tax litigation and is not a jurisdictional deadline. She contends that the Commissioner's interpretation could be better than the petitioners, but the bottom line is that it is "not clear" and therefore rejecting the Commissioner's interpretation of "such matters" referring to the 30 day deadline as jurisdictional. She adds that such non-jurisdictional deadline would not help Boechler unless it is able to be equitably tolled, calling equitable tolling "traditional feature of American jurisprudence".
