= ZF Automotive U.S., Inc. v. Luxshare, Ltd. =

ZF Automotive U.S., Inc. v. Luxshare, Ltd. AlixPartners, LLP, et al. v. The Fund for Protection of Investors' Rights in Foreign States
- Supreme Court of the United States

Argued March 23, 2022 Decided June 13, 2022
- Full case name: ZF Automotive U.S., Inc., et al. v. Luxshare, Ltd. AlixPartners, LLP, et al. v. The Fund for Protection of Investors' Rights in Foreign States
- Docket nos.: 21-401; 21-518
- Citations: 596 U.S. 619 (more)
- Argument: Oral argument

Holding
- Only a governmental or intergovernmental adjudicative body constitutes a “foreign or international tribunal” under 28 U.S.C. § 1782, and the bodies at issue in these cases do not qualify as such tribunals.

Court membership
- Chief Justice John Roberts Associate Justices Clarence Thomas · Stephen Breyer; Samuel Alito · Sonia Sotomayor; Elena Kagan · Neil Gorsuch; Brett Kavanaugh · Amy Coney Barrett

Case opinion
- Majority: Barrett, joined by unanimous

Laws applied
- 28 U.S.C. § 1782

ZF Automotive U.S., Inc. v. Luxshare, Ltd., 596 U.S. 619 (2022), is a decision of the United States Supreme Court on the scope of §1782 of Title 28 of the United States Code. The issue of statutory interpretation for the Court was whether a private commercial arbitral tribunal constitutes a "foreign or international tribunal" under 28 U.S.C. § 1782(a) and therefore empowers federal districts courts to compel the production by persons subject to their jurisdiction of documents and testimony for such tribunals.

The case was decided together with AlixPartners LLP v. The Fund for Protection of Investor Rights in Foreign States which concerned an investor-state arbitration.

In a unanimous decision, the Court ruled that a private arbitral tribunal overseas is not a "foreign or international tribunal" under 28 U.S.C. § 1782(a). The Court also decided that the investor-state arbitral tribunal in the AlixPartners case was not a foreign or international tribunal for the purposes of §1782.

== Background ==
In ZF Automotive US v. Luxshare, the parties referred a dispute as to alleged fraudulent conduct to a commercial arbitration panel in Germany pursuant to an arbitration clause in the underlying contract.

Luxshare filed an ex parte application under §1782 seeking discovery. The District Court for the Eastern District of Michigan granted the application, ordering ZF to produce documents in accordance and ordering an officer to attend for deposition. ZF moved to quash the subpoenas, but the ruling by the District Court was upheld by the Sixth Circuit Court of Appeals.

In AlixPartners, a Russian investor in a failed bank in Lithuania, SNORAS, claimed that Lithuania had expropriated certain investments from SNORAS. After finding that the bank had not met its obligations, the Lithuanian central bank nationalised SNORAS and appointed Simon Freakley, the CEO of a consulting firm, AlixPartners as temporary administrator. SNORAS was subsequently declared insolvent. The investor assigned his claim to The Fund for Protection of Investor Rights in Foreign States, a Russian Corporation, which initiated arbitration proceedings against Lithuania in accordance with the bilateral investment treaty between Lithuania and Russia. The Fund chose an ad hoc arbitration in accordance with Arbitration Rules of the United Nations Commission on International Trade Law (UNCITRAL).

The Fund filed a §1782 application. AlixPartners argued that an ad hoc arbitration panel was not a "foreign or international tribunal" but the District Court for the Southern District of New York granted the application. This decision was upheld by the Second Circuit Court of Appeals.

The Second Circuit had previously decided that a private arbitral panel was not a "foreign or international tribunal" in Natl. Broadcasting Co. v. Bear Stearns Co. The Second Circuit took a different view as to the ad hoc tribunal in AlixPartners. There were conflicting decisions on the issue in various Appellate Circuits.

In both cases, the defendant applied to the Supreme Court of the United States for certiorari (to review the decisions of the Appellate Courts).

== Supreme Court ==
To resolve the split between Circuit Appellate Courts and to address the definition of "foreign or international tribunal", the Supreme Court granted certiorari and consolidated the two cases on November 5, 2021. The Court heard oral arguments on March 23, 2022. On June 13, 2022, the court ruled unanimously to reverse the rulings of both Courts of Appeal. Justice Barrett wrote the unanimous opinion.

=== Opinion of the Court ===
The Court held that a "foreign or international tribunal" should be a tribunal belonging to a foreign nation. The Court accepted that the broad definition of "tribunal" might encompass private adjudicatory bodies, but the phrase "foreign or international" preceding the word "tribunal" has a governmental connotation, which shows that the tribunal should have sovereign authority conferred by a nation. Therefore, Justice Barrett wrote, "foreign tribunals" and "international tribunals" complement each other. The former is a tribunal imbued with governmental authority by one nation, and the latter is a tribunal imbued with governmental authority by multiple nations.

The Court regarded its interpretation of §1782 as consistent with congress antecedents and added that extending §1782 to include private dispute resolution bodies might cause "tension" with the Federal Arbitration Act (FAA), as §1782 permits a larger scope of discovery than the FAA does.

The Court concluded thus (at page 16):

"In sum, only a governmental or intergovernmental adjudicative body constitutes a “foreign or international tribunal” under §1782. Such bodies are those that exercise governmental authority conferred by one nation or multiple nations. Neither the private commercial arbitral panel in the first case nor the ad hoc arbitration panel in the second case qualifies."

The Court (at page 15) left open the possibility that some investor-state arbitrations might qualify as foreign tribunals, on a case by case basis, holding as follows:

"None of this forecloses the possibility that sovereigns might imbue an ad hoc arbitration panel with official authority. Governmental and intergovernmental bodies may take many forms, and we do not attempt to prescribe how they should be structured. The point is only that a body does not possess governmental authority just because nations agree in a treaty to submit to arbitration before it. The relevant question is whether the nations intended that the ad hoc panel exercise governmental authority. And here, all indications are that they did not."

== Subsequent caselaw ==
Following ZF, in In re Alpene 2022 WL 15497008 (Oct. 27, 2022), the Eastern District of New York held that section 1782 discovery was not available in relation to an investor-State arbitration conducted under the auspices of the International Centre for the Settlement of Investment Disputes (ICSID). The Court found that there was “insufficient support” for the argument that Malta and China (the two relevant States) had “intended to imbue the ICSID arbitration panel with government authority".

The Southern District of New York reached the same conclusion as to an ICSID arbitral panel in In Re: Application of Webuild S.p.A. and Sacyr S.A. 2022 WL 17807321 (Dec. 19, 2022).
