= Gallardo v. Marstiller =

- Supreme Court of the United States

Argued January 10, 2022 Decided June 6, 2022
- Full case name: Gianinna Gallardo, an Incapacitated Person, By and Through Her Parents and Co-Guardians Pilar Vassallo and Walter Gallardo v. Simone Marstiller, In Her Official Capacity as Secretary of the Florida Agency for Health Care Administration
- Docket no.: 20-1263
- Citations: 596 U.S. 420 (more)
- Argument: Oral argument

Holding
- The Medicaid Act permits a state to seek reimbursement from settlement payments allocated for future medical care.

Court membership
- Chief Justice John Roberts Associate Justices Clarence Thomas · Stephen Breyer; Samuel Alito · Sonia Sotomayor; Elena Kagan · Neil Gorsuch; Brett Kavanaugh · Amy Coney Barrett

Case opinions
- Majority: Thomas, joined by Roberts, Alito, Kagan, Gorsuch, Kavanaugh, Barrett
- Dissent: Sotomayor, joined by Breyer

Laws applied
- Medicaid Act

Gallardo v. Marstiller, 596 U.S. 420 (2022), was a United States Supreme Court case that held the Medicaid Act permits a state to seek reimbursement from settlement payments allocated for future medical care. The case was brought by the parents of Gianinna Gallardo, who was in a persistent vegetative state.
