= List of United States Supreme Court cases, volume 596 =

This is a list of all the United States Supreme Court cases from volume 596 of the United States Reports:

Note: As of July 2025, final bound volumes for the U.S. Supreme Court's United States Reports have been published through volume 582 (June 2017). Newer cases from subsequent future volumes do not yet have official page numbers and typically use three underscores in place of the page number; e.g., Example v. United States, 700 U.S. ___ (2050).

Case name	Docket no.	Date decided
Badgerow v. Walters	20–1143	March 31, 2022
The “look-through” approach to determining federal jurisdiction, whereby a federal court assesses whether there is a jurisdictional basis to decide a Federal Arbitration Act Section 4 petition to compel arbitration by means of examining the parties’ underlying dispute, does not apply to requests to confirm or vacate arbitral awards under Sections 9 and 10 of the Federal Arbitration Act.
Thompson v. Clark	20–659	April 4, 2022
To demonstrate a favorable termination of a criminal prosecution for purposes of the Fourth Amendment claim under §1983 for malicious prosecution, a plaintiff need not show that the criminal prosecution ended with some affirmative indication of innocence. A plaintiff need only show that his prosecution ended without a conviction.
City of Austin v. Reagan National Advertising of Austin, LLC	20–1029	April 21, 2022
The distinction between on-premises signs and off-premises signs in the city of Austin’s sign code is facially content-neutral under the First Amendment.
Cassirer v. Thyssen-Bornemisza Collection Foundation	20–1566	April 21, 2022
In a suit raising non-federal claims against a foreign state or instrumentality under the Foreign Sovereign Immunities Act, a court should determine the substantive law by using the same choice-of-law rule applicable in a similar suit against a private party.
Brown v. Davenport	20–826	April 21, 2022
When a state court has ruled on the merits of a state prisoner’s claim, a federal court cannot grant habeas relief without applying both the test this Court outlined in Brecht v. Abrahamson and the one Congress prescribed in the Antiterrorism and Effective Death Penalty Act of 1996; the Sixth Circuit erred in granting habeas relief to Mr. Davenport based solely on its assessment that he could satisfy the Brecht standard.
United States v. Vaello Madero	20–303	April 21, 2022
The Constitution does not require Congress to extend Supplemental Security Income benefits to residents of Puerto Rico.
Boechler v. Commissioner	20–1472	April 21, 2022
Section 6330(d)(1)'s 30-day time limit to file a petition for review of a collection due process determination is a non-jurisdictional deadline subject to equitable tolling.
Cummings v. Premier Rehab Keller, P.L.L.C.	20–219	April 28, 2022
Emotional distress damages are not recoverable in a private action to enforce either the Rehabilitation Act of 1973 or the Affordable Care Act.
LeDure v. Union Pacific Railroad Company	20–807	April 28, 2022
Affirmed by an evenly-divided Court.
Shurtleff v. City of Boston	20–1800	May 2, 2022
1. When the government opens up its property to the public for purely private speech, it does not necessarily constitute government speech.; 2. Permitting private religious expression on government property when that property is made a public forum for comparable private expression does not violate the establishment clause.; 3. Prohibiting the use of government property for private expression based solely on its religious content while allowing comparable private speech constitutes impermissible viewpoint discrimination and violates the First and Fourteenth Amendments.
FEC v. Ted Cruz for Senate	21–12	May 16, 2022
Section 304 of the Bipartisan Campaign Reform Act of 2002 (52 U.S.C. 30116(j)) is unconstitutional because it burdens core political speech.
Patel v. Garland	20–979	May 16, 2022
Federal courts lack jurisdiction to review facts found as part of any judgment relating to the granting of discretionary relief in immigration proceedings enumerated under 8 U.S.C. § 1252(a)(2).
Shinn v. Ramirez	20–1009	May 23, 2022
Under 28 U.S.C. § 2254(e)(2), a federal habeas court may not conduct an evidentiary hearing or otherwise consider evidence beyond the state-court record based on the ineffective assistance of state postconviction counsel.
Morgan v. Sundance, Inc.	21–328	May 23, 2022
Federal courts may not adopt an arbitration-specific rule conditioning a waiver of the right to arbitrate on a showing of prejudice.
Gallardo v. Marstiller	20–1263	June 6, 2022
The Medicaid Act permits a state to seek reimbursement from settlement payments allocated for future medical care.
Southwest Airlines Co. v. Saxon	21–309	June 6, 2022
Airplane cargo loaders and ramp supervisors are exempt from the Federal Arbitration Act.
Siegel v. Fitzgerald	21–441	June 6, 2022
Congress's enactment of a significant fee increase that exempted debtors in two states violated the uniformity requirement of the Bankruptcy Clause.
Egbert v. Boule	21–147	June 8, 2022
The holding in Bivens v. Six Unknown Named Agents does not extend to causes of action for either Boule's claims of First Amendment retaliation or Fourth Amendment excessive-force.
Kemp v. United States	21–5726	June 13, 2022
The term "mistake" in Federal Rule of Civil Procedure 60(b)(1) includes a judge's errors of law.
Garland v. Aleman Gonzalez	20–322	June 13, 2022
Section 1252(f)(1) of the Immigration and Nationality Act deprived the district courts of jurisdiction to issue the class-wide injunction.
Johnson v. Arteaga-Martinez	19–896	June 13, 2022
Section 1231(a)(6) of the Illegal Immigration Reform and Immigrant Responsibility Act of 1996 does not require the government to provide noncitizens detained for six months with bond hearings in which the Government bears the burden of proving, by clear and convincing evidence, that a noncitizen poses a flight risk or a danger to the community.
Denezpi v. United States	20–7622	June 13, 2022
The double jeopardy clause does not bar successive prosecutions of distinct offenses arising from a single act, even if a single sovereign prosecutes them.
ZF Automotive U. S., Inc. v. Luxshare, Ltd.	21–401	June 13, 2022
Only a governmental or intergovernmental adjudicative body constitutes a "foreign or international tribunal" under 28 U.S.C. § 1782, and the bodies at issue in these cases do not qualify as such tribunals.
Viking River Cruises, Inc. v. Moriana	20–1573	June 15, 2022
The FAA does not allow the division of PAGA actions into individual and non-individual claims through an agreement to arbitrate.
Golan v. Saada	20–1034	June 15, 2022
A court is not categorically required to examine all possible ameliorative measures before denying a Hague Convention petition for return of a child to a foreign country once the court has found that return would expose the child to a grave risk of harm.
Ysleta del Sur Pueblo v. Texas	20–493	June 15, 2022
The Restoration Act bans only forms of gambling explicitly banned within the State of Texas
American Hospital Association v. Becerra	20–1114	June 15, 2022
The Medicare Prescription Drug, Improvement, and Modernization Act of 2003 does not preclude judicial review of the reimbursement rates set by the Department of Health and Human Services for certain outpatient prescription drugs that hospitals provide to Medicare patients; in this case, because HHS did not conduct a survey of hospitals’ acquisition costs in 2018 and 2019, its decision to vary reimbursement rates only for 340B hospitals in those years was unlawful.
George v. McDonough	21–234	June 15, 2022
The invalidation of a Department of Veterans Affairs regulation after a veteran's benefits decision becomes final cannot support a claim for collateral relief permitting revision of that decision based on "clear and unmistakable error" under 38 U.S.C. §§ 5109A and 7111.
Arizona v. City and County of San Francisco	20–1775	June 15, 2022
Dismissed as improvidently granted.
Carson v. Makin	20–1088	June 21, 2022
Maine's "nonsectarian" requirement for the otherwise generally available tuition assistance payments violates the Free Exercise Clause.
Shoop v. Twyford	21–511	June 21, 2022
A transportation order that allows a prisoner to search for new evidence is not "necessary or appropriate in aid of" a federal court's adjudication of a habeas corpus action when the prisoner has not shown that the desired evidence would be admissible in connection with a particular claim for relief.
United States v. Washington	21–404	June 21, 2022
Washington's law facially discriminated against the Federal Government and its contractors. Because §3172 does not clearly and unambiguously waive the Federal Government’s immunity from discriminatory state laws, Washington’s law was unconstitutional under the Supremacy Clause.
United States v. Taylor	20–1459	June 21, 2022
An attempted Hobbs Act robbery does not qualify as a "crime of violence" under 18 U.S.C. § 924(c)(3)(A) because no element of the offense requires proof that the defendant used, attempted to use, or threatened to use force.
Marietta Memorial Hospital Employee Health Benefit Plan v. DaVita Inc.	20–1641	June 21, 2022
The Medicare Secondary Payer statute does not authorize disparate-impact liability, and the Marietta Plan’s coverage terms for outpatient dialysis were lawful because those terms applied uniformly to all covered individuals.

== See also ==
- List of United States Supreme Court cases by the Roberts Court
- 2021 term opinions of the Supreme Court of the United States
