= FEC v. Ted Cruz for Senate =

Federal Election Commission v. Ted Cruz for Senate
- Supreme Court of the United States

Argued January 19, 2022 Decided May 16, 2022
- Full case name: Federal Election Commission v. Ted Cruz for Senate and Senator Rafael Edward "Ted" Cruz
- Docket no.: 21-12
- Citations: 596 U.S. 289 (more)
- Argument: Oral argument
- Decision: Opinion

Holding
- Section 304 of the Bipartisan Campaign Reform Act of 2002 (52 U.S.C. 30116(j)) is unconstitutional because it burdens core political speech.

Court membership
- Chief Justice John Roberts Associate Justices Clarence Thomas · Stephen Breyer; Samuel Alito · Sonia Sotomayor; Elena Kagan · Neil Gorsuch; Brett Kavanaugh · Amy Coney Barrett

Case opinions
- Majority: Roberts, joined by Thomas, Alito, Gorsuch, Kavanaugh, Barrett
- Dissent: Kagan, joined by Breyer, Sotomayor

Laws applied
- U.S. Const. amend. I

Federal Election Commission v. Ted Cruz for Senate, 596 U.S. 289 (2022), was a case related to the First Amendment to the United States Constitution. The Supreme Court of the United States struck down section 304 of the Bipartisan Campaign Reform Act, which limited the amount of money that candidates could be paid on personal loans to their campaign.

== Background ==
Section 304 of the Bipartisan Campaign Reform Act (BCRA) of 2002 (52 U.S.C. § 30116(j)) precludes candidates for Congress from using greater than $250,000 in post-election contributions each cycle to pay off debt the campaigns owe to the candidates. Campaigns can repay loans in excess of US$250,000 in full within 20 days of the election and using pre-election funds, but otherwise loan repayments were capped at that amount afterwards. The purpose of the provision was to prevent candidates from receiving bribes; If a candidate made a loan to their own campaign, and charged interest on the loan, then people and lobbyists could donate money to a candidate's election campaign, of which the money could be used to pay off the loan the candidate made and benefit the candidate's personal wealth.

As part of his re-election campaign for the U.S. Senate seat from Texas in 2018, Senator Ted Cruz loaned $260,000 to his campaign. The campaign failed to repay his loan within 20 days of the election, so later repaid him the maximum amount by law, leaving Cruz $10,000 of his loan. Cruz and his election committee sued the Federal Election Commission (FEC), which oversees violations of election financing, in the United States District Court for the District of Columbia. Cruz and his campaign argued that BCRA's limit on repayment violated Cruz's First Amendment rights since it placed a limit on his ability to spend for free speech. The FEC argued that the election committee, on the day before the election, had more than $2.2 million in funds which they could have paid Cruz within the 20-day window but purposely waited until after the window as to create a vehicle to challenge BCRA, making Cruz's losses self-inflicted. The three-judge panel at the district court ruled unanimously in Cruz's favor. Judge Neomi Rao, in the court opinion, "Protections for political speech extend to campaign financing because effective speech requires spending money" and that "the loan-repayment limit intrudes on fundamental rights of speech and association without serving a substantial government interest"

== Supreme Court ==
On August 24, 2021, the Federal Election Commission filed to dismiss the motion on a lack of standing. The request was denied.

The FEC appealed the case to the Supreme Court, on the question of whether the loan repayment limits of BCRA did violate the First Amendment. Oral arguments were heard on January 19, 2022.

The court released its decision on May 16, 2022. The 6–3 decision, falling along the court's ideological lines, was written by Chief Justice John Roberts and joined by Justices Samuel Alito, Clarence Thomas, Neil Gorsuch, Brett Kavanaugh, and Amy Coney Barrett, and upheld the decision of the D.C. Appellate Court and that the loan repayment stipulation of BCRA was unconstitutional. Roberts wrote that BCRA "burdens core political speech without proper justification", and argued that such personal loans "will sometimes be the only way for an unknown challenger with limited connections to front-load campaign spending. And early spending — and thus early expression — is critical to a newcomer's success."

Justice Elena Kagan wrote the dissenting opinion joined by Stephen Breyer and Sonia Sotomayor. Kagan wrote "Repaying a candidate's loan after he has won election cannot serve the usual purposes of a contribution: The money comes too late to aid in any of his campaign activities. All the money does is enrich the candidate personally at a time when he can return the favor — by a vote, a contract, an appointment. It takes no political genius to see the heightened risk of corruption."
