= Department of State v. AIDS Vaccine Advocacy Coalition =

2025 American court case on impoundment

- Court: District Court for the District of Columbia
- Full case name: AIDS Vaccine Advocacy Coalition and Journalism Development Network, Inc. v. United States Department of State, United States Agency for International Development, Marco Rubio, Secretary of State and Acting administrator of United States Agency for International Development, Office of Management and Budget, Russell Vought, Director of Management and Budget, and Donald Trump, President of the United States of America Global Health Council, Small Business Association for International Companies, HIAS, Management Sciences for Health, Chemonics International Inc., DAI Global, LLC, Democracy International, Inc., and American Bar Association v. Trump, Rubio, Marocco, Vought, Department of State, USAID, and Office of Management and Budget
- Started: February 10, 2025
- Docket nos.: 1:25-cv-00400 and 1:25-cv-00402 (D.D.C.); Terminated February 2025: 25-5046 and 25-5047; Terminated August 2025: 25-5098 and 25-5097; Filed September 2025: 25-5317 and 25-5319 (D.C. Cir.); 24A831 25A269 (Supreme Court)

Case history
- Appealed to: DC Circuit
- Subsequent action: district ruling stayed by Supreme Court via shadow docket

Court membership
- Judge sitting: Amir H. Ali

Keywords
- Administrative Procedure Act; Impoundment Control Act

Department of State v. AIDS Vaccine Advocacy Coalition (Note: In the district court and court of appeals, the order of the parties is the reverse: AIDS Vaccine Advocacy Coalition v. Department of State, with the lead plaintiff listed first. In the Supreme Court, the petitioner or party seeking relief from the Supreme Court is listed first, so the Department of State is listed first as the applicant for a stay.) is a United States court case filed in 2025 against the second Trump administration by several non-profit organizations who were supposed to receive billions in funds from the US government.

== Background ==
Consistent with Executive Order 14169, Secretary of State Marco Rubio "paused all U.S. foreign assistance funded by or through the State Department and" USAID.

In August 2025, Trump disclosed to the Congress that the administration would rescind nearly $5 billion in foreign assistance appropriations. The funds would have expired in less than 45 days after the disclosure. If the state department withheld the funds for the 45 days under the Impoundment Control Act, the administration would prevent the funds from being disbursed (a "pocket rescission"). A page posted to the Government Accountability Office's website in August 2025 says "A pocket rescission is illegal".

== Proceedings ==
In February 2025, Public Citizen filed suit representing AIDS Vaccine Advocacy Coalition and Journalism Development Network. A parallel case was filed by Global Health Council and other organizations the same month. Both cases were assigned to Judge Amir Ali.

On 13 February 2025, Ali granted a request for a temporary restraining order against the freeze. On 25 February 2025, Ali ordered the administration to comply with the 13 February 2025 order by 11:59 p.m. on February 26. The administration appealed to the DC Circuit who, on 26 February 2025, dismissed the administration's appeal. On 26 February 2025, hours before the deadline, John Roberts stayed Ali's ruling. On 5 March 2025, in an unsigned order, the Supreme Court denied the administration's application for stay of the 25 February 2025 order. The Justices Alito, Gorsuch, Kavanaugh and Thomas dissented.

On 6 March 2025, Ali ordered payments be made by March 10. On 10 March 2025, Ali ordered the administration to not withhold compensation for work completed prior to 13 February 2025.

On 13 August 2025, the Court of Appeals for the D.C. Circuit said:

The district court erred in granting that relief because the grantees lack a cause of action to press their claims. They may not bring a freestanding constitutional claim if the underlying alleged violation and claimed authority are statutory. Nor do the grantees have a cause of action under the APA because APA review is precluded by the Impoundment Control Act (ICA). And the grantees may not reframe this fundamentally statutory dispute as an ultra vires claim either. Instead, the Comptroller General may bring suit as authorized by the ICA. Accordingly, we vacate the part of the district court’s preliminary injunction involving impoundment.

— Karen L. Henderson joined by Gregory G. Katsas

The Judge Florence Y. Pan dissented from the circuit's 13 August 2025 ruling. On 20 August 2025, the circuit said "the preliminary injunction that requires the government to obligate the appropriated funds remains in effect". On 28 August 2025, the circuit issued an amended decision allowing the case to proceed.

On 3 September 2025, Ali blocked the pocket rescission. The DC circuit declined to block the order.

On 9 September 2025, John Roberts partially stayed the 3 September 2025 order "for funds that are subject to the President’s August 28, 2025 recission proposal". On 26 September 2025, the court granted an application for stay by the administration: The Justices Jackson, Kagan and Sotomayor dissented.

The application for stay presented to The Chief Justice and by him referred to the Court is granted. The Government, at this early stage, has made a sufficient showing that the Impoundment Control Act precludes respondents’ suit, brought pursuant to the Administrative Procedure Act, to enforce the appropriations at issue here. The Government has also made a sufficient showing that mandamus relief is unavailable to respondents. And, on the record before the Court, the asserted harms to the Executive’s conduct of foreign affairs appear to outweigh the potential harm faced by respondents. This order should not be read as a final determination on the merits. The relief granted by the Court today reflects our preliminary view, consistent with the standards for interim relief.

The District Court’s September 3, 2025 order granting a preliminary injunction in case Nos. 1:25–cv–400 and 1:25–cv–402 is stayed as to the funding subject to the President’s August 28 special message, pending the disposition of the Government’s appeal in the United States Court of Appeals for the District of Columbia Circuit and disposition of a petition for a writ of certiorari, if such writ is timely sought. Should the petition for a writ of certiorari be denied, this stay shall terminate automatically. In the event certiorari is granted, the stay shall terminate upon the sending down of the judgment of this Court.

— Unsigned (September 26, 2025)

== See also ==
- Impoundment of appropriated funds
