= United States v. Washington (2022) =

- Supreme Court of the United States

Argued April 18, 2022 Decided June 21, 2022
- Full case name: United States v. Washington, et al.
- Docket no.: 21-404
- Citations: 596 U.S. 832 (more)
- Argument: Oral argument

Holding
- Washington's law facially discriminated against the Federal Government and its contractors. Because §3172 does not clearly and unambiguously waive the Federal Government’s immunity from discriminatory state laws, Washington’s law was unconstitutional under the Supremacy Clause.

Court membership
- Chief Justice John Roberts Associate Justices Clarence Thomas · Stephen Breyer; Samuel Alito · Sonia Sotomayor; Elena Kagan · Neil Gorsuch; Brett Kavanaugh · Amy Coney Barrett

Case opinion
- Majority: Breyer, joined by unanimous

United States v. Washington, 596 U.S. 832 (2022), was a United States Supreme Court case dealing with workers' compensation laws at the federal and state levels. The case revolved around compensation for non-federal employees working on nuclear and chemical cleanup at the Hanford Site in Washington State required under state law.

== Background ==
The Hanford Site near the Tri-Cities in Washington state had formerly been used for the processing of nuclear materials for weapons during World War II, and then additional nuclear research during the Cold War. Nuclear and chemical material stored in underground tanks on site were found to leak into the environment including the Columbia River, and the site's major systems were decommissioned by 1971. By 1988, the site was designated as a Superfund cleanup site, and the United States Department of Energy (DOE) took over the site in 1989 to begin cleanup operations, bringing in several subcontractors to oversee and manage safe cleanup operations, an effort expected to run well throughout the 21st century. At the time of litigation, the site had about 400 federal employees and over 10,000 employees from non-federal contractors; over 100,000 people have worked on the Hanford Site over its history.

Federal employees were broadly covered under the Federal Employees' Compensation Act (FECA), but until 2018, the contract employees were covered by the Washington Industrial Insurance Act (WIIA); in either case, benefits are paid for by the DOE. WIIA is generally weaker than FECA, only providing compensation for employee illnesses that could be proven to have been a result of their occupation. An investigative report by KING-TV in February 2017 found that many of the non-federal employees that were likely exposed routinely to nuclear and chemical wastes at Harford were being denied compensation. Washington's senators, Maria Cantwell and Patty Murray, requested the DOE examine the workers' compensation, and in a 2018 report, the DOE's Inspector General affirmed there was a lapse in monitoring in how workers' compensation was handled. The DOE acknowledged that they had terminated their contract with Penser North America which did preliminary processing of these claims and was responsible for denials.

As a result of KING-TV's report, Washington's legislation passed HR 1723 in 2018, which specifically made a workers' compensation exemption for the Hanford Site; due to its high risk factor, HR 1723 established a lower threshold of showing presumption of illness caused by their occupation, comparable to FECA. However, such claims could still be denied by showing evidence of other external factors that could cause that illness, such as lifestyle choices or prior exposure at other jobs. Former and current employees at the site with presumed illnesses were eligible to apply for compensation, as long as these illnesses existed before the law was enacted in June 2018.

The U.S. government argued the law improperly allowed the state to place an undue burden on the federal government, as the cost of covering the non-federal employees' compensation could be great. They sued the state in the United States District Court for the Eastern District of Washington at the end of 2018, but Judge Stanley Bastian ruled in favor of the state by June 2019. Bastian stated in his opinion that "(Current federal law) gives Washington powers that include the ability to legislate…to address specific risks to employees in specific industries." The government appealed to the Ninth Circuit but the three-judge panel unanimously upheld the district court's ruling in August 2020, and denied rehearing en banc in April 2021, over the dissent of Judge Daniel P. Collins and three other judges.

== Supreme Court ==
The government petitioned the Supreme Court to review the lower court's ruling. The government asked the Court to determine if there was intergovernmental immunity that prevented the state from placing certain obligations on the federal government, or if under 40 U.S.C. § 3172(a), the state could enact workers' compensation rights for work on the federal facility. The Court granted the case in January 2022.

Prior to oral arguments, Washington amended its law with SB 5890 that expanded the presumption to all workers, not just federal contractors, that worked at a radiological hazardous waste facility within the state. The new law came into effect in March 2022, which the state argued in filings made the case moot since it no longer discriminated against the federal government.

Oral arguments were held on April 18, 2022.

=== Opinion of the Court ===
The case was decided on June 22, 2022. In a unanimous decision, the Supreme Court ruled that the Washington law violated the Supremacy Clause of the United States Constitution by discriminating against the federal government.

Justice Stephen Breyer wrote that the Washington law fell outside the scope of 40 U.S.C. § 3172(a), since it discriminated in favor of federal employees and contractors and did not cover other workers employees in the state. Breyer wrote that only Congress may make such exemptions under the Supremacy Clause. He wrote that the law also made a "causal presumption" about the various diseases and illness one might get while working at the Hanford site. He also rejected the state's contention that the case was moot with the enactment of a new law.
