= Chris Geidner =

American journalist and blogger

- Education: Youngstown State University (BA); Ohio State University (JD)
- Employer(s): Tribune Chronicle; BuzzFeed News (2012–2019); MSNBC (2021–present)
- Website: Law Dork

Christopher Geidner is an American journalist and blogger. He is the former legal editor at the online news organization BuzzFeed News. He is the publisher of the Law Dork newsletter and blog.

== Background ==
Geidner's first job in journalism was as a copy editor and editorial writer at the Tribune Chronicle in Warren, Ohio. Later, he attended law school at the Moritz College of Law at Ohio State University, where he served as editor-in-chief of the Ohio State Law Journal. After passing the bar in Ohio, Geidner practiced law at Porter, Wright, Morris and Arthur and worked as Ohio's principal assistant attorney general.

In 2009, Geidner turned his focus to the blog "Law Dork". His writing launched him into a position at Metro Weekly as a senior political writer. While at Metro Weekly, he was awarded with the National Lesbian and Gay Journalists Association Excellence in Writing Award for his coverage of the repeal of the "Don't ask, don't tell" policy on military service of non-heterosexual people. He also received the Gay and Lesbian Alliance Against Defamation Outstanding Magazine award for work on the history of the Defense of Marriage Act.

Geidner started covering national LGBT political and legal issues for BuzzFeed in 2012 as a senior political reporter. He was named the Sarah Pettit LGBT Journalist of the Year by the National Lesbian and Gay Journalists Association in 2012 and the Journalist of the Year in 2014.

In 2019, Geidner left BuzzFeed News and joined The Justice Collaborative to work on criminal justice issues.

In April 2021, Geidner began writing columns at MSNBC.

He was the deputy editor for legal affairs at Grid News at its launch in early 2022.

== See also ==
- Editorial board
- Literature review
- Political analysis
