= For Keeps (bookstore) =

Independent bookstore in the United States

Coordinates: 33.7554°N 84.3818°W

For Keeps (stylized as For Keeps!) is a bookstore in Atlanta, Georgia, that specializes in Black classic and rare books. The shop opened in 2018 and is owned and operated by Rosa Duffy.

== History ==
Rosa Duffy was inspired to open the bookstore after reading her father's collection of the Black 1960s periodical SoulBook. Her interest in Black literature was nurtured by her parents, graduates of Spelman College and Morehouse College. Duffy began collecting Black classic books at age 18 and planned to open the store after her personal book collection began to grow too large.

For Keeps opened in November 2018 in the historically Black Sweet Auburn neighborhood of Atlanta. The location was selected because the area was under threat of gentrification and Duffy wished to contribute to the neighborhood's Black identity. Duffy found many books in the For Keeps collection at stores such as Strand Bookstore.

=== Founder ===
Rosa Duffy (born 1989) was born and raised in Atlanta. Her father, Eugene Duffy, has worked with several of the city's Black mayors. Her sister, Josie Duffy Rice, is a journalist. She attended The New School for her bachelor's degree.

== Inventory ==
For Keeps carries used and new books, although some of the books cannot be purchased and must be read in-store. The rare book collection includes some first edition and out-of-print titles by authors like Alice Walker, Ralph Ellison, and Octavia Butler. The store also has a reading room.

Events are held at the store periodically.

== See also ==
- List of independent bookstores in the United States
