= Denezpi v. United States =

- Supreme Court of the United States

Decided June 13, 2022
- Full case name: Denezpi v. United States
- Docket no.: 20-7622
- Citations: 596 U.S. 591 (more)

Holding
- The double jeopardy clause does not bar successive prosecutions of distinct offenses arising from a single act, even if a single sovereign prosecutes them.

Court membership
- Chief Justice John Roberts Associate Justices Clarence Thomas · Stephen Breyer; Samuel Alito · Sonia Sotomayor; Elena Kagan · Neil Gorsuch; Brett Kavanaugh · Amy Coney Barrett

Case opinions
- Majority: Barrett, joined by Roberts, Thomas, Breyer, Alito, Kavanaugh
- Dissent: Gorsuch, joined by Sotomayor, Kagan (Parts I and III)

Laws applied
- U.S. Const. amends. V

Denezpi v. United States, 596 U.S. 591 (2022), was a United States Supreme Court case in which the Court held that the double jeopardy clause does not bar successive prosecutions of distinct offenses arising from a single act, even if a single sovereign prosecutes them.

== Background ==
An officer with the federal Bureau of Indian Affairs filed a criminal complaint against Merle Denezpi, a member of the Navajo Nation, charging Denezpi with three crimes alleged to have occurred at a house located within the Ute Mountain Ute Reservation: assault and battery, in violation of 6 Ute Mountain Ute Code §2; terroristic threats, in violation of 25 CFR §11.402; and false imprisonment, in violation of 25 CFR §11.404. The complaint was filed in a CFR court, a court which administers justice for Indian tribes in certain parts of Indian country where tribal courts have not been established. Denezpi pleaded guilty to the assault and battery charge and was sentenced to time served—140 days' imprisonment.

Six months later, a federal grand jury in the District of Colorado indicted Denezpi on one count of aggravated sexual abuse in Indian country, an offense covered by the federal Major Crimes Act. Denezpi moved to dismiss the indictment, arguing that the Double Jeopardy Clause barred the consecutive prosecution. The district court denied Denezpi's motion. Denezpi was convicted and sentenced to 360 months' imprisonment. The Tenth Circuit Court of Appeals affirmed.
