= Josie Duffy Rice =

American writer

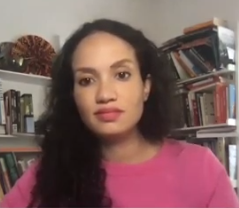
- Rice in 2020
- Born: Josie Duffy; 1987 (age 38–39); Atlanta, Georgia, U.S.
- Education: Columbia University (BA); Harvard University (JD)
- Occupation: Writer
- Years active: 2010–present
- Employer: The Appeal (President)
- Notable work: Justice in America podcast
- Spouse: Zak Cheney-Rice (m. 2016)
- Children: 2
- Relatives: Rosa Duffy (sister)
- Website: josieduffyrice.com

Josie Duffy Rice (née Duffy) is an American writer and political commentator. Recently, she served as president of The Appeal, a news outlet that centers the criminal justice system. Duffy Rice also co-hosted the podcast Justice in America. Her work has been cited by The New York Times.

== Early life and education ==
Duffy Rice was born Josie Duffy, the eldest daughter of Eugene and Norrene Duffy, and was raised in Atlanta. She has one sister, For Keeps bookstore owner Rosa Duffy. Her grandmother is Josie Johnson, a civil rights movement activist who organized heavily in Minneapolis.

Duffy Rice received her bachelor's degree in political science from Columbia University. She worked as an executive assistant for a public defender organization in the Bronx directly out of college, which influenced her decision to attend law school. She received her Juris Doctor degree from Harvard Law School. Duffy Rice preferred writing to legal work, and after law school she began to work in the realms of policy and activism.

== Career ==
Duffy Rice's work focuses on criminal justice issues such as police brutality and cash bail. Duffy Rice advocates for police abolition and defunding police departments as one strategy towards that goal. She appeared as roundtable guest on The Daily Show to discuss this perspective and has also discussed criminal justice-related issues for outlets such as Slate, NPR, and Late Night with Seth Meyers.

Duffy Rice previously worked at Fair Punishment Project as a strategist. In 2017 she joined the Justice Collaborative, which housed The Appeal, a website that centered policy, politics, and criminal justice. Duffy Rice was named president of The Appeal in 2019 and served until 2021.

Duffy Rice also co-hosted the podcast Justice in America with assorted guest hosts Darnell Moore, Donovan X. Ramsey, Derecka Purnell, and Zak Cheney-Rice. The show covers criminal justice topics like mass incarceration.

Duffy Rice was recently published in the September 2020 issue of Vanity Fair guest edited by Ta-Nehisi Coates.

In 2021, Duffy Rice was a co-writer of the first episode in the Hulu anthology series The Premise. Also in 2021, Duffy Rice joined the staff of Crooked Media's What a Day podcast as one of three rotating co-hosts for What a Day founding anchor Gideon Resnick. Duffy Rice, with fellow co-hosts Tre'vell Anderson and Priyanka Aribindi, replaced departing host Akilah Hughes on July 30, 2021.

In 2022, Duffy Rice served as a correspondent on the Al Jazeera program Fault Lines, where she examined Tennessee's extreme sentencing laws for juveniles. In 2023, Duffy Rice was the host and co-Executive Producer of Unreformed: The Story of the Alabama Industrial School for Negro Children, a limited series podcast investigating a juvenile justice facility in Alabama.

== Personal life ==
In May 2016, Duffy Rice married journalist Zak Cheney-Rice in Atlanta at the same venue where her parents had married 30 years previously. They have two children together, a son (b. 2017) and a daughter (b. 2020). They reside in Atlanta.

== Honors and awards ==
- 2020 - Fortune, 40 Under 40
