= Immigration and Naturalization Service v. Delgado =

- Supreme Court of the United States

Argued January 11, 1984 Decided April 17, 1984
- Full case name: Immigration and Naturalization Service, et al. v. Delgado
- Citations: 466 U.S. 210 (more) 104 S. Ct. 1758; 80 L. Ed. 2d 247

Holding
- Unless the circumstances of an encounter between law enforcement and citizens are so intimidating as to demonstrate that a reasonable person would have believed he was not free to leave if he had not responded, one cannot say that the encounter qualifies as detention under the Fourth Amendment.

Court membership
- Chief Justice Warren E. Burger Associate Justices William J. Brennan Jr. · Byron White; Thurgood Marshall · Harry Blackmun; Lewis F. Powell Jr. · William Rehnquist; John P. Stevens · Sandra Day O'Connor

Case opinions
- Majority: Rehnquist, joined by Burger, White, Blackmun, Stevens, O'Connor
- Concurrence: Stevens
- Concurrence: Powell (in judgment only)
- Concur/dissent: Brennan, joined by Marshall

Laws applied
- U.S. Const. Amend. IV

Immigration and Naturalization Service v. Delgado, 466 U.S. 210 (1984), was a United States Supreme Court decision on the limits of worksite enforcement by immigration agents. Specifically, the Court ruled that factory raids by the Immigration and Naturalization Service (INS) were not illegal seizures under the Fourth Amendment to the U.S. Constitution.

== Summary ==
INS v. Delgado concerned whether the restrictions placed on government officials by the Fourth Amendment applied to worksite enforcement operations by the Immigration and Naturalization Service (INS). The case was originally filed by the International Ladies Garment Workers Union (ILGWU) in 1978 on behalf of members of the union who worked at two Los Angeles garment factories (Southern California Davis Pleating Co. and Mr. Pleat) raided by the INS in January and September 1977. The raids were based on search warrants that claimed probable cause to believe undocumented workers were employed in the factories, but did not name specific workers to be questioned or detained. During the operation, some INS agents guarded the exits while others moved through the factory questioning workers about their to citizenship status. Agents arrested workers they believed to be undocumented immigrants. Four of the employees questioned filed actions against the INS in 1978, arguing that the sweeps violated their Fourth Amendment right to be free from unreasonable search and seizure, and their right to equal protection under the Fifth Amendment. The U.S. district court rejected the plaintiff's claims, but the Ninth Circuit Court of Appeals reversed the lower court's ruling in 1982, finding that the faculty raids were unlawful violations of the Fourth Amendment. The INS appealed that ruling to the Supreme Court.

The Fourth Amendment to the U.S. Constitution states, "The right of the people to be secure in their persons, houses, papers, and effects, against unreasonable searches and seizures, shall not be violated, and no Warrants shall issue, but upon probable cause, supported by Oath or affirmation, and particularly describing the place to be searched, and the persons or things to be seized." The case hinged narrowly on whether a seizure took place at all, and therefore whether the protections of the Fourth Amendment applied. The Court had previously ruled that non-citizen immigrants are protected by the Fourth Amendment. Also, the Court had ruled that not every interaction between police or government officials and a suspect qualifies as a search or seizure, and that officials can approach and speak with people so long as the interaction is brief. In the Delgado case, the Court held that the factory survey was not a seizure of the workforce, but instead an instance of “mere questing.” The presence of INS agents at the doors of the factory and the manner with which the workers were approached and questioned, the Court ruled, did not constitute a formal detention. Therefore the Fourth Amendment did not apply.

== Background ==
=== Factory Sweeps ===
The Immigration and Naturalization Service has a history of conducting "factory sweeps" across the country in order to locate undocumented immigrant workers. While critics have claimed that these sweeps are largely ineffective and serve most often as media events, the INS maintains that they are an important tool for protecting U.S. jobs. These sweeps occur when the INS receives information that a certain business may be employing undocumented immigrants and the workers at the business are determined to fit such a profile, though, as in the case of INS v. Delgado, no specific individuals need be identified. Typically, 15 or 25 INS agents enter a place of business, surrounding workers and guarding exits, and proceed to question workers with regards to their citizenship status, often carrying those suspected of being undocumented away in handcuffs. As can be expected, these raids can cause considerable stress for the workers; one woman subjected to this procedure is even quoted as saying she was afraid "because if I leave and they think I don't have no papers and they shoot me or something." Despite the fear-inducing nature of the sweeps, the Supreme Court maintained that those subjected to them have in no way been detained or seized, as they are technically free to go at any time and any "reasonable person" would realize this freedom.

=== Terry v. Ohio ===
In the case of Terry v. Ohio, the Supreme Court established a practical standpoint on “mere questioning”, effectively giving law enforcement officials the ability to speak with citizens, and even search them, in certain situations without necessarily being held accountable to the restrictions of the Fourth Amendment. In this case, an officer approached three men he suspected of casing a building for a robbery or stick up. He confronted them, questioned them, and for the purposes of his own safety, patted them down. The officer found that they were carrying concealed weapons, which were later used as evidence that they were about to attempt a robbery. The case hinged on whether the weapons were admissible as evidence under the Fourth Amendment, which protects against unreasonable and warrantless searches and seizures, and prevents evidence collected in such a manner from being used in court. The opinion of the Court was that in lieu of the circumstances, in which the officer had reason to fear for his own safety, the pat-down was reasonable and did not constitute a search to which the Fourth Amendment is applicable. Specifically, the Court held that “Though the police must, whenever practicable, secure a warrant to make a search and seizure, that procedure cannot be followed where swift action based upon on-the-spot observations of the officer on the beat is required” and “The reasonableness of any particular search and seizure must be assessed in light of the particular circumstances against the standard of whether a man of reasonable caution is warranted in believing that the action taken was appropriate.” While these particular circumstances warranted a search based on the safety of the officer, the decision of the Court allowed for a greater freedom of officers to confront and question individuals in other situations. The Supreme Court has frequently referenced Terry v. Ohio and the principle of “mere questioning” in later cases, including INS v. Delgado. The most important formulation of the principle as it relates to Delgado is that “law enforcement officials can approach and speak to individuals without the constraints of the Fourth Amendment’s reasonableness standard, so long as the encounter is consensual.”

=== United States v. Mendenhall ===
Terry v. Ohio, and the ensuing principle of mere questioning, left open the important question of where the line is drawn between a consensual encounter and a temporary detention. In United States v. Mendenhall, the Court outlined a number of variables which may indicate a temporary detention or seizure, and a number of variables which may indicate a mere consensual stop. Those indicative of a seizure are “(1) threatening presence of several officers; (2) display of weapons by officer; (3) some physical touching of the individual; and (4) use of language or tone of voice indicating that compliance with the request might be compelled.” Those factors indicative of a consensual stop are “(1) questioning in public; (2) officers not wearing uniforms; (3) displaying no weapons; (4) approaching, not summoning, an individual and identifying oneself as a law enforcement official; and (5) requesting, not demanding, to ask questions or see identification.” INS v. Delgado demonstrates a complex mixture of these factors, making the determination difficult. For example, while the workers were free to move about the factory, INS agents were stationed at all exits, possibly indicating a level of detention.

== Opinion of the Court ==
Justice William Rehnquist delivered the opinion of the court, which Chief Justice Warren E. Burger and Justices Byron White, Harry Blackmun, Sandra Day O’Connor, and John P. Stevens joined. John P. Stevens filed a concurring opinion in the result. William J. Brennan filed and Thurgood Marshall joined an opinion concurring in part and dissenting in part.

=== Concurring Opinion ===
The Court held that “The factory surveys did not result in the seizure of the entire workforces, and the individual questioning of the respondent employees by INS agents concerning their citizenship did not amount to a detention or seizure under the Fourth Amendment.” The decision is broken down into a few key components. For one, interrogation by members of law enforcement for one’s identity or identification does not in itself constitute a Fourth Amendment seizure. Also, so long as a “reasonable person” would not have reason to believe that he could not leave the questioning, it does not constitute a detention under the Fourth Amendment. While the Court accepted that the ability of the workers to leave the questioning was “meaningfully restricted”, it was restricted by their obligations to their employer and not by the INS. Further, the entire workforce of the factory was not seized during the sweeps, though agents were placed by the doors. The agents’ presence at the exits was held to be nothing more than a measure to make sure that all workers were questioned, and “If mere questioning did not constitute a seizure when it occurred inside the factory, it was no more a seizure when it occurred at the exits.” Lastly, as there was no seizure of the workforce in its entirety, the respondents may only litigate what happened to them individually and, based on their testimonies, all of their interactions with agents were nothing more than “classic consensual encounters.”

=== Dissenting Opinion ===
The dissenting opinion, written by Justice Brennan and joined by Justice Marshall, calls the decision of the Court a “sleight of hand.” Brennan cited a number of preceding cases, including Terry v. Ohio and United States v. Mendenhall, drawing up a general rule from Mendenhall as follows; that "the threatening presence of several officers, the display of a weapon by an officer, some physical touching of the person of the citizen, or the use of language or tone of voice indicating that compliance with the officer's request might be compelled” is a threshold indication of a seizure taking place. Brennan concluded that the factory sweep was very much a seizure. While there was no restraint of the individuals physically, the sudden and systematic intrusion of 15 to 25 agents upon the factory and the manner in which they dealt with the workers demonstrated a “show of force” and created an “intimidating atmosphere” with “widespread disturbance among workers”, fit to indicate that a reasonable person would not feel free to leave, and that a seizure was in fact taking place.
