= Thompson v. Clark =

- Supreme Court of the United States

Argued October 12, 2021 Decided April 4, 2022
- Full case name: Larry Thompson v. Pagiel Clark, et al.
- Docket no.: 20-659
- Citations: 596 U.S. 36 (more)
- Argument: Oral argument

Holding
- To demonstrate a favorable termination of a criminal prosecution for purposes of the Fourth Amendment claim under §1983 for malicious prosecution, a plaintiff need not show that the criminal prosecution ended with some affirmative indication of innocence. A plaintiff need only show that his prosecution ended without a conviction.

Court membership
- Chief Justice John Roberts Associate Justices Clarence Thomas · Stephen Breyer; Samuel Alito · Sonia Sotomayor; Elena Kagan · Neil Gorsuch; Brett Kavanaugh · Amy Coney Barrett

Case opinions
- Majority: Kavanaugh, joined by Roberts, Breyer, Sotomayor, Kagan, Barrett
- Dissent: Alito, joined by Thomas, Gorsuch

Laws applied
- U.S. Const. amend. IV, 42 U.S.C. § 1983

Thompson v. Clark, 596 U.S. 36 (2022), was a United States Supreme Court case in which the court held that, to demonstrate a favorable termination of a criminal prosecution for malicious prosecution, a plaintiff need not show that the criminal prosecution ended with some affirmative indication of innocence. A plaintiff need only show that his prosecution ended without a conviction. The 6–3 opinion was authored by Justice Brett Kavanaugh. Justice Samuel Alito dissented from the majority opinion and was joined by Justices Thomas and Gorsuch. Media coverage of the decision portrayed the Court's ruling as a victory for civil rights lawsuits.

== Background ==
Larry Thompson, a Navy veteran and postal worker, lived with his fiancée and newborn daughter in an apartment in Brooklyn, New York. When Thompson's daughter was one week old, his sister-in-law called 911 and accused Thompson of sexually abusing the child. Four police officers were dispatched to Thompson's house to investigate but Thompson refused to let them in without a search warrant. In response, the four officers forced their way into Thompson's home and attempted to restrain Thompson. Thompson resisted, was taken into custody for two days, and was subsequently charged with resisting arrest. Further investigation by law enforcement revealed no signs of child abuse. Rather than prosecute Thompson for resisting arrest, the prosecution opted to dismiss the charges. Neither the prosecutor or the judge offered any explanation as to why the charges were dismissed.

Following the dismissal of his criminal charges, Thompson filed suit against the officers responsible for arresting him under 42 U.S.C. § 1983 and alleging, among other things, that he had been maliciously prosecuted in violation of his Fourth Amendment rights, which provided the right against unlawful seizures. Thompson's claims were dismissed at the trial level and his appeal to the Second Circuit Court of Appeals was similarly denied as both courts held that, under existing precedent, Thompson was required to show that he had been affirmatively found innocent of committing the underlying crime. On November 6, 2020, Thompson filed a petition for a writ of certiorari, which was granted on March 8, 2021. During the October 12, 2021, oral argument, the justices posed a series of hypotheticals involving the fictional character of Jean Valjean and the mythological centaur.

== Decision ==
On April 4, 2022, the Supreme Court released a 6–3 opinion authored by Justice Kavanaugh holding that Thompson was not required to show that he had been affirmatively exonerated of committing the alleged crime and, instead, "need only show that his prosecution ended without a conviction." After analyzing the historical precedent, the majority opinion concluded that the general rule is that if a criminal proceeding was terminated prior to securing a conviction, the termination could be treated as favorable to the accused. The majority further held that this conclusion was consistent with the purpose and values of the Fourth Amendment as, otherwise, the Fourth Amendment could be violated with impunity, so long as the prosecutor did not explain why the charge had been dropped. With this holding pronounced, the Court remanded the case for further proceedings regarding whether Thompson had been "seized" under the Fourth Amendment, whether the officers had probable cause to enter Thompson's home without a warrant, and whether any of the officers were entitled to qualified immunity.

Justice Alito dissented from the majority's holding, arguing that Court had improperly combined precedent from different legal contexts in order to reach its conclusion. Instead, the dissent argued that Thompson should have pursued alternative constitutional claims, rather than ones under the Fourth Amendment.

== Reaction ==
Immediate media reaction to the Court's decision portrayed the ruling as victory for plaintiffs asserting civil rights claims against law enforcement officers.
