= Shinn v. Ramirez =

- Supreme Court of the United States

Argued December 8, 2021 Decided May 23, 2022
- Full case name: David Shinn, Director, Arizona Department of Corrections, Rehabilitation and Reentry, et al. v. David Martinez Ramirez and Barry Lee Jones
- Docket no.: 20-1009
- Citations: 596 U.S. 366 (more)
- Argument: Oral argument

Holding
- Under 28 U.S.C. § 2254(e)(2), a federal habeas court may not conduct an evidentiary hearing or otherwise consider evidence beyond the state-court record based on the ineffective assistance of state postconviction counsel.

Court membership
- Chief Justice John Roberts Associate Justices Clarence Thomas · Stephen Breyer; Samuel Alito · Sonia Sotomayor; Elena Kagan · Neil Gorsuch; Brett Kavanaugh · Amy Coney Barrett

Case opinions
- Majority: Thomas, joined by Roberts, Alito, Gorsuch, Kavanaugh, Barrett
- Dissent: Sotomayor, joined by Breyer, Kagan

Laws applied
- Antiterrorism and Effective Death Penalty Act of 1996

Shinn v. Ramirez, 596 U.S. 366 (2022), was a case decided by the United States Supreme Court related to the Antiterrorism and Effective Death Penalty Act of 1996. The court held that new evidence that was not in the state court's records, based on ineffective assistance of post-conviction counsel, could not be used in an appeal to a federal court.

== Background ==
David Ramirez and Barry Jones were convicted of murders in Arizona and sentenced to death in 1989 and 1994, respectively. Ramirez appealed to federal court where his federal public defenders uncovered evidence of intellectual disability and extensive childhood abuse that had not been presented at his initial trial. Jones also appealed to federal court, where federal investigators found evidence suggesting he was innocent. In both cases, the new lawyers argued that the failure of the initial public defenders to present evidence that could have been mitigating constituted ineffective counsel.

In Martinez v. Ryan (2012), the Supreme Court held that prisoners may use post-conviction counsel's ineffectiveness as a reason to overcome procedural default. The United States Court of Appeals for the Ninth Circuit applied Martinez to rule for Ramirez and Jones on their habeas corpus petitions. The Court denied rehearing en banc over the dissent of Judge Daniel P. Collins and seven other judges. Arizona filed a petition for a writ of certiorari.

== Supreme Court ==
Certiorari was granted in the case on May 17, 2021. On May 23, 2022, the Supreme Court reversed the Ninth Circuit in a 6–3 opinion.

=== Majority opinion ===
The majority opinion was authored by Clarence Thomas, and joined by John Roberts, Samuel Alito, Neil Gorsuch, Brett Kavanaugh, and Amy Coney Barrett, the court's six conservative justices. Thomas stated that allowing claims, like the ones in this case, would cause delays in the future, and cited the brutality of the crimes that were committed. He also cited a dissent written by the late Justice Antonin Scalia in Martinez, and another dissenting opinion written by Roberts in Trevino v. Thaler (2013), a case that applied Martinez.

=== Dissenting opinion ===
The dissenting opinion was authored by Sonia Sotomayor, and joined by Elena Kagan and Stephen Breyer, the court's three liberal justices. She described the decision as "perverse" and "illogical". Sotomayor also attacked the majority opinion's citations of previous dissenting opinions to back up its reasoning. She also hinted that doing so could make the Supreme Court's decision making process appear illegitimate.
