= Fisher v. University of Texas =

Fisher v. University of Texas may refer to either of two United States Supreme Court cases:

- Fisher v. University of Texas (2013) (alternatively called Fisher I), 570 U.S. 297 (2013), a case which ruled that strict scrutiny should be applied to determine the constitutionality of a race-sensitive admissions policy.
- Fisher v. University of Texas (2016) (alternatively called Fisher II), 579 U.S. 365 (2016), a case which ruled that the University of Texas's use of race in their admissions policy passes the constitutional muster.

== See also ==
- List of United States Supreme Court cases
- Lists of United States Supreme Court cases by volume
