= 2005 term United States Supreme Court opinions of John Paul Stevens =

The 2005 term of the Supreme Court of the United States began October 3, 2005, and concluded October 1, 2006. This was the thirty-first term of Associate Justice John Paul Stevens's tenure on the Court.
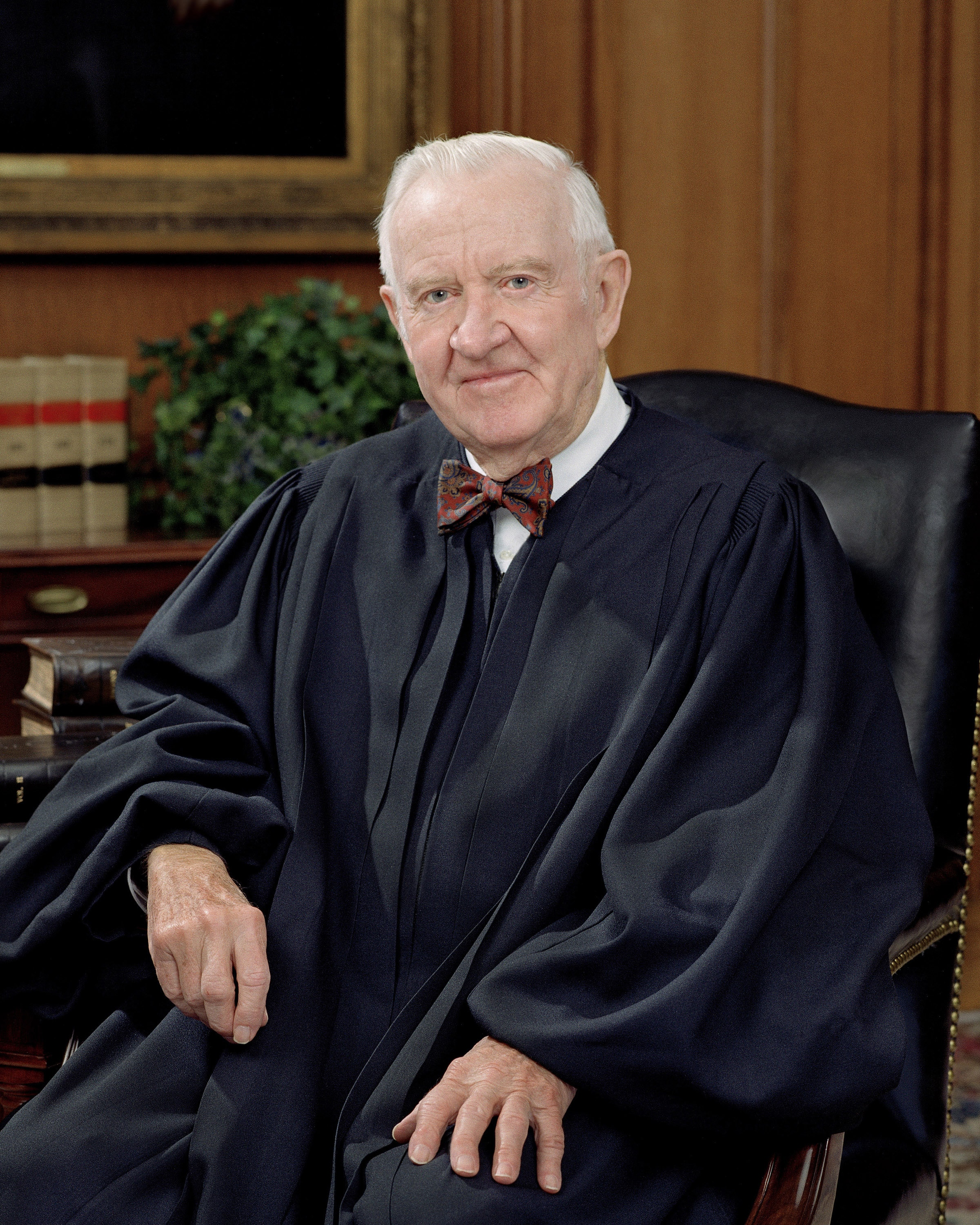

John Paul Stevens 2005 term statistics

7	Majority or plurality	6	Concurrence	2	Other
14	Dissent	1	Concurrence/dissent	Total =	30
Bench opinions = 28		Opinions relating to orders = 2		In-chambers opinions = 0
Unanimous opinions: 2		Most joined by: Souter, Ginsburg, Breyer (11)		Least joined by: O'Connor, Alito (2)

Type	Case	Citation	Issues	Joined by	Other opinions
	IPB, Inc. v. Alvarez	546 U.S. 21 (2005)		Unanimous	
	Schaffer v. Weast	546 U.S. 49 (2005)	Individuals with Disabilities Education Act • individualized education program challenges • burden of proof		O'Connor; Ginsburg; Breyer
Stevens joined O'Connor's 6-2 decision and filed a separate concurrence.
	United States v. Georgia	546 U.S. 151 (2006)		Ginsburg	Scalia
Stevens also joined Scalia's unanimous opinion.
	Volvo Trucks North America v. Reeder-Simco GMC	546 U.S. 164 (2006)		Thomas	Ginsburg
	Evans v. Chavis	546 U.S. 189 (2006)			Breyer
Stevens concurred in the judgment of Breyer's 8-justice opinion.
	Brown v. Sanders	546 U.S. 212 (2006)		Souter	Scalia; Breyer
	Central Virginia Community College v. Katz	546 U.S. 356 (2006)		O'Connor, Souter, Ginsburg, Breyer	Thomas
Thomas filed a dissent.
	Unitherm Food Systems, Inc. v. Swift-Eckrich, Inc.	546 U.S. 394 (2006)		Kennedy	Thomas
	Lance v. Dennis	546 U.S. 459 (2006)			per curiam; Ginsburg
Stevens dissented from the Court's per curiam opinion.
	Illinois Tool Works Inc. v. Independent Ink, Inc.	547 U.S. 28 (2006)	Patents • antitrust	Roberts, Scalia, Kennedy, Souter, Thomas, Ginsburg, Breyer	
Stevens wrote for the Court that a patented product in a tying arrangement is not presumed to have market power for purposes of antitrust law.
	Merrill Lynch, Pierce, Fenner & Smith, Inc. v. Dabit	547 U.S. 71 (2006)	Securities regulation • federal preemption	Roberts, Scalia, Kennedy, Souter, Thomas, Ginsburg, Breyer	
Stevens wrote for the Court that the Securities Litigation Reform Act preempted state law holder claims, even though such claims could not be brought under federal law.
	Georgia v. Randolph	547 U.S. 103 (2006)			Souter; Breyer; Roberts; Scalia; Thomas
Stevens also joined Souter's 5-3 decision.
	Day v. McDonough	547 U.S. 198 (2006)	Habeas corpus	Breyer	Ginsburg; Scalia
Stevens filed one of two dissents from Ginsburg's 5–4 decision ruling that courts could dismiss a habeas petition filed outside the statute of limitations sua sponte. Though Stevens agreed with this interpretation, he dissented from the Court's decision to announce its judgment when a relevant case would be decided later in the term. The Court had recently granted certiorari in Lawrence v. Florida, a case which would answer the question of whether Day's petition was actually barred by the statute of limitations. Stevens wrote that "[i]t seems improvident to affirm a possibly erroneous Court of Appeals judgment that dismissed Day's habeas petition without an evaluation of its merits when we have already granted certiorari to address the issue on which the Court of Appeals may have erred." He suggested the lower court may still avoid a "miscarriage of justice" by keeping Day's case on its docket until after Lawrence is decided, "but it would be better practice for us to do so ourselves."
	Ark. Dep't of Human Servs. v. Ahlborn	547 U.S. 268 (2006)	Medicaid	Unanimous	
The Court ruled that a federal statutory prohibition against liens on personal property to recover Medicaid expenditures applied to settlements, so that only the portion of the settlement that represented payment for past medical expenses could be claimed by the state.
	Marshall v. Marshall	547 U.S. 293 (2006)	Bankruptcy • jurisdiction		Ginsburg
	Brigham City v. Stuart	547 U.S. 398 (2006)			Roberts
Stevens also joined Roberts' unanimous decision.
	Garcetti v. Ceballos	547 U.S. 410 (2006)			Kennedy; Souter; Breyer
Stevens filed one of three dissents from Kennedy's 5–4 decision, and also joined Souter's.
	Rapanos v. United States	547 U.S. 715 (2006)	Environmental regulation	Souter, Ginsburg, Breyer	Scalia; Roberts; Kennedy; Breyer
	Samson v. California	547 U.S. 843 (2006)		Souter, Breyer	Thomas
Stevens dissented from Thomas' 6–3 decision.
	Moreland v. Federal Bureau of Prisons	547 U.S. 1106 (2006)	Statutory interpretation		
Stevens filed a statement respecting the denial of certiorari, in which he clarified that the Court's action was not an endorsement of the lower court's interpretation of the federal sentencing provision for "good-time" credits.
	Rangel-Reyes v. United States	547 U.S. 1200 (2006)	Rights of the accused • U.S. Const. amend. VI • right to a jury trial		Thomas
Stevens filed a statement respecting the Court's denial of certiorari in which he expressed that he still believed Almendarez-Torres v. United States, 523 U. S. 224 (1998), was wrongly decided, but "that is not a sufficient reason for revisiting the issue" in light of stare decisis. "The denial of a jury trial on the narrow issues of fact concerning a defendant’s prior conviction history, unlike the denial of a jury trial on other issues of fact that give rise tomandatory minimum sentences will seldom create any significant risk of prejudice to the accused." Thomas filed a dissent from the denial of cert., believing that Almendarez-Torres should be overruled.
	Dixon v. United States	548 U.S. 1 (2006)		Roberts, Scalia, Kennedy, Thomas, Ginsburg, Alito	Kennedy; Alito; Breyer
	Fernandez-Vargas v. Gonzales	548 U.S. 30 (2006)			Souter
	Woodford v. Ngo	548 U.S. 81 (2006)		Souter, Ginsburg	Alito; Breyer
	Kansas v. Marsh	548 U.S. 163 (2006)	Death penalty		Thomas; Scalia; Souter
Stevens filed one of two dissents from Thomas' 5–4 decision, and joined Souter's.
	Washington v. Recuenco	548 U.S. 212 (2006)			Thomas; Kennedy; Ginsburg
Stevens also joined Ginsburg's dissent.
	League of United Latin American Citizens v. Perry	548 U.S. 399 (2006)	Electoral redistricting	Breyer (in part)	Kennedy; Roberts; Scalia; Souter; Breyer
	Randall v. Sorrell	548 U.S. 230 (2006)			Breyer; Kennedy; Thomas; Alito; Souter
	Beard v. Banks	548 U.S. 521 (2006)		Ginsburg	Breyer; Thomas; Ginsburg
	Hamdan v. Rumsfeld	548 U.S. 557 (2006)		Souter, Ginsburg, Breyer; Kennedy (in part)	Kennedy; Breyer; Scalia; Thomas; Alito
