= 2005 term United States Supreme Court opinions of Stephen Breyer =

The 2005 term of the Supreme Court of the United States began October 3, 2005, and concluded October 1, 2006. This was the twelfth term of Associate Justice Stephen Breyer's tenure on the Court.
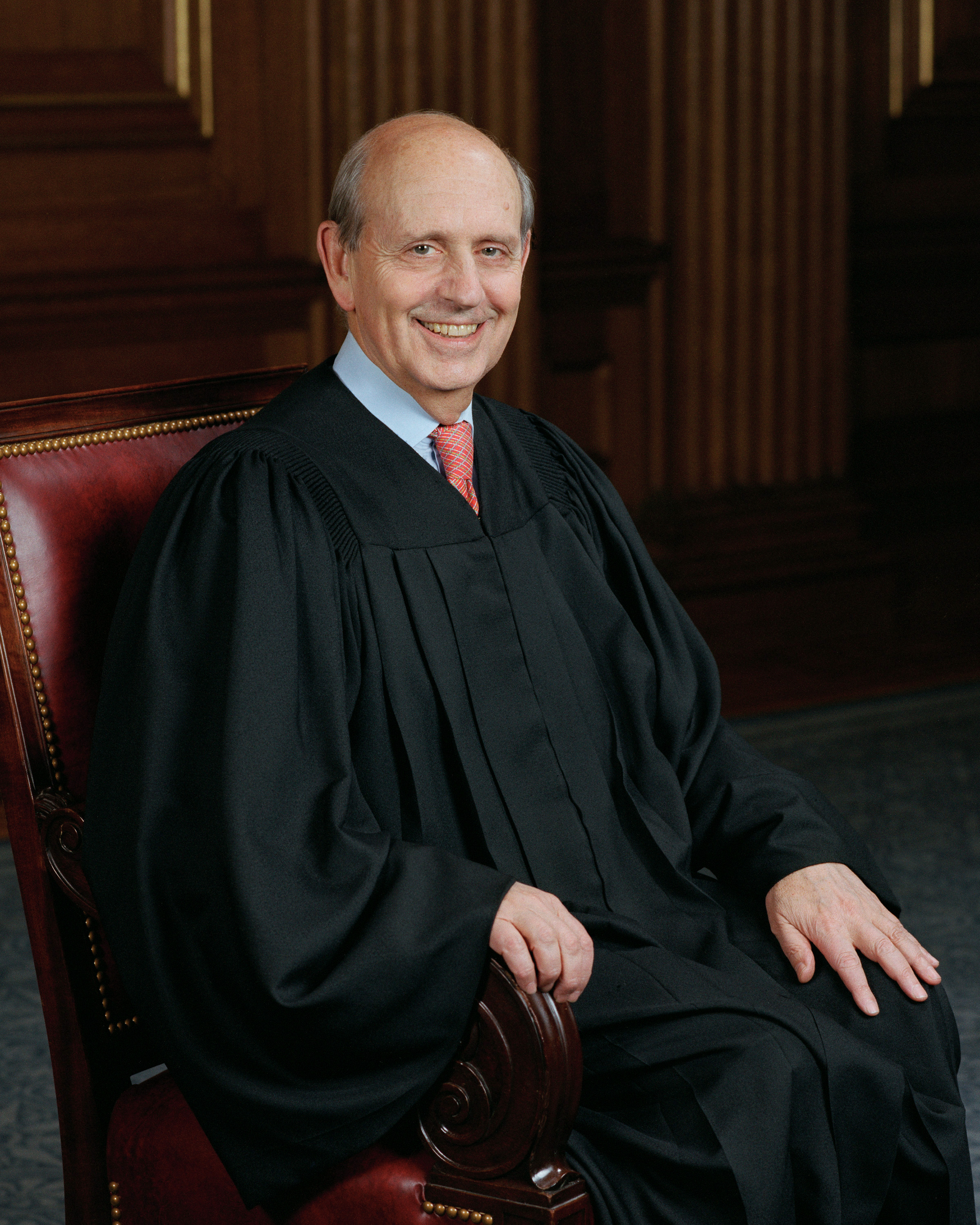

Stephen Breyer 2005 term statistics

| 7 | Majority or plurality | 4 | Concurrence | 0 | Other |
| 11 | Dissent | 3 | Concurrence/dissent | Total = | 25 |
| Bench opinions = 24 | | Opinions relating to orders = 1 | | In-chambers opinions = 0 |
| Unanimous opinions: 1 | | Most joined by: Souter (14) | | Least joined by: O'Connor (2) |

| Type | Case | Citation | Issues | Joined by | Other opinions |
|---|---|---|---|---|---|
| | United States v. Olson | 546 U.S. 43 (2005) | | Unanimous | |
| | Schaffer v. Weast | 546 U.S. 49 (2005) | Individuals with Disabilities Education Act • individualized education program challenges • burden of proof | | O'Connor; Stevens; Ginsburg |
| | Evans v. Chavis | 546 U.S. 189 (2006) | | Roberts, O'Connor, Scalia, Kennedy, Souter, Thomas, Ginsburg | Stevens |
| | Brown v. Sanders | 546 U.S. 212 (2006) | | Ginsburg | Scalia; Stevens |
| | Rice v. Collins | 546 U.S. 333 (2006) | | Souter | Kennedy |
| | Oregon v. Guzek | 546 U.S. 517 (2006) | | Roberts, Stevens, Kennedy, Souter, Ginsburg | Scalia |
| | Allen v. Ornoski | 546 U.S. 1136 (2006) | death penalty | | |
Breyer dissented from the Court's denial of a stay of execution, and denial of certiorari to a death row inmate who "is 76 years old, blind, suffers from diabetes, is confined to a wheelchair, and has been on death row for 23 years." Breyer believed "that in the circumstances he raises a significant question as to whether his execution would constitute cruel and unusual punishment."
| | Scheidler v. National Organization for Women, Inc. | 547 U.S. 9 (2006) | | Roberts, Stevens, Scalia, Kennedy, Souter, Thomas, Ginsburg | |
Alito did not participate.
| | Georgia v. Randolph | 547 U.S. 103 (2006) | | | Souter; Stevens; Roberts; Scalia; Thomas |
| | Garcetti v. Ceballos | 547 U.S. 410 (2006) | | | Kennedy; Stevens; Souter |
| | Anza v. Ideal Steel Supply Corp. | 547 U.S. 451 (2006) | | | Kennedy; Scalia; Thomas |
| | Hudson v. Michigan | 547 U.S. 586 (2006) | | Stevens, Souter, Ginsburg | Scalia; Kennedy |
| | Empire HealthChoice Assurance, Inc. v. McVeigh | 547 U.S. 677 (2006) | | Kennedy, Souter, Alito | Ginsburg |
| | Rapanos v. United States | 547 U.S. 715 (2006) | | | Scalia; Roberts; Kennedy; Stevens |
| | Dixon v. United States | 548 U.S. 1 (2006) | | Souter | Stevens; Kennedy; Alito |
| | Burlington, N. & S. F. R. Co. v. White | 548 U.S. 53 (2006) | | Roberts, Stevens, Scalia, Kennedy, Souter, Thomas, Ginsburg | Alito |
| | Woodford v. Ngo | 548 U.S. 81 (2006) | | | Alito; Stevens |
| | Lab. Corp. of Am. Holdings v. Metabolite Labs. | 548 U.S. 124 (2006) | patent law | Stevens, Souter | per curiam |
Breyer dissented from the Court's per curiam dismissal of certiorari as improvidently granted.
| | Randall v. Sorrell | 548 U.S. 230 (2006) | | Roberts; Alito (in part) | Kennedy; Thomas; Alito; Stevens; Souter |
| | Arlington Central School Dist. Bd. of Ed. v. Murphy | 548 U.S. 291 (2006) | | Stevens, Souter | Alito; Ginsburg; Souter |
| | Sanchez-Llamas v. Oregon | 548 U.S. 331 (2006) | | Stevens, Souter; Ginsburg (in part) | Roberts; Ginsburg |
| | League of United Latin American Citizens v. Perry | 548 U.S. 399 (2006) | electoral redistricting | | Kennedy; Roberts; Stevens; Scalia; Souter |
| | Beard v. Banks | 548 U.S. 521 (2006) | | Roberts, Kennedy, Souter | Thomas; Stevens; Ginsburg |
| | Hamdan v. Rumsfeld | 548 U.S. 557 (2006) | | Kennedy, Souter, Ginsburg | Stevens; Kennedy; Scalia; Thomas; Alito |
| | Clark v. Arizona | 548 U.S. 735 (2006) | | | Souter; Kennedy |
