= 2005 term United States Supreme Court opinions of Clarence Thomas =

The 2005 term of the Supreme Court of the United States began October 3, 2005, and concluded October 1, 2006. This was the fifteenth term of Associate Justice Clarence Thomas's tenure on the Court.
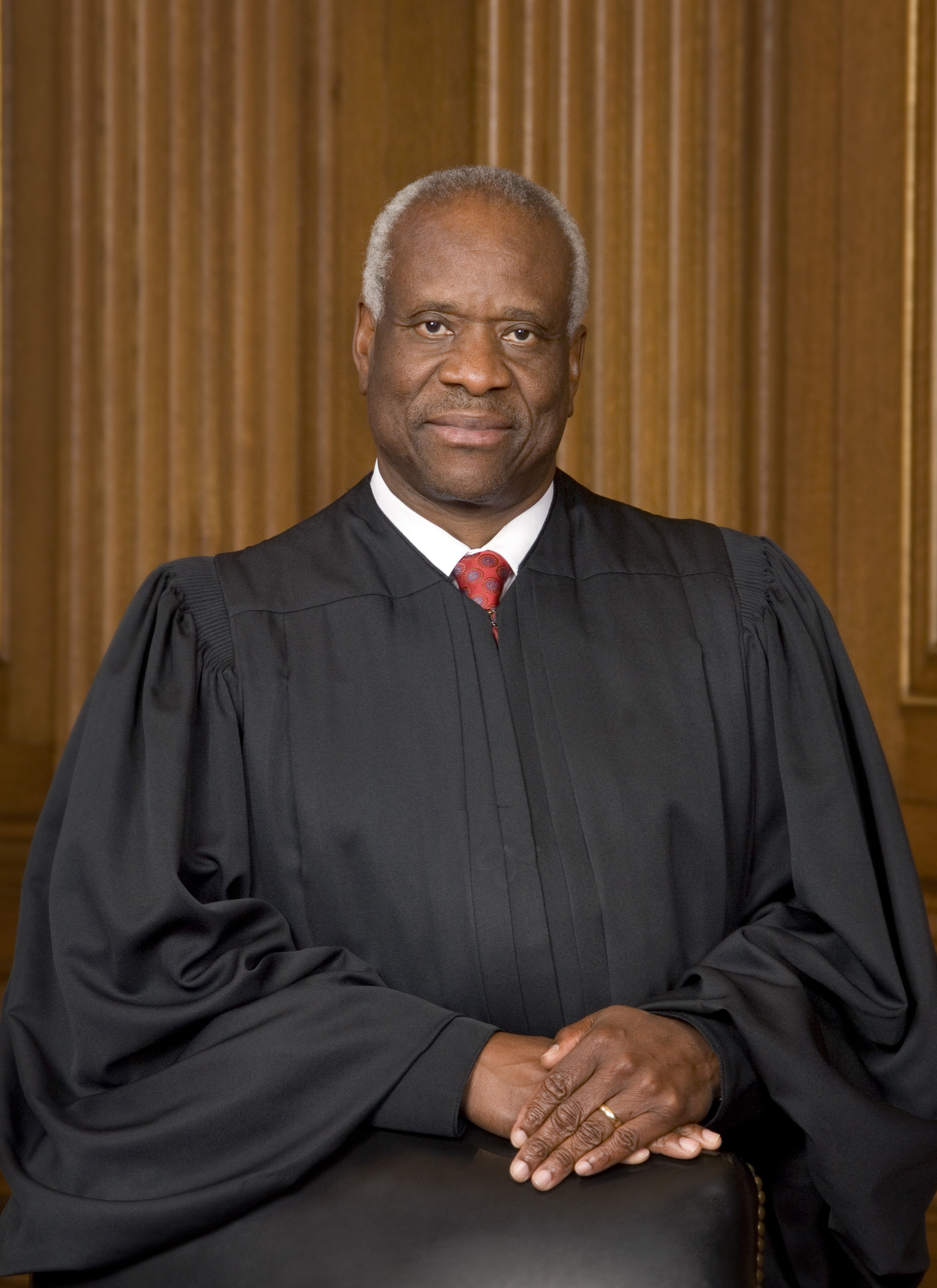

Clarence Thomas 2005 term statistics

| 8 | Majority or plurality | 2 | Concurrence | 0 | Other |
| 8 | Dissent | 2 | Concurrence/dissent | Total = | 20 |
| Bench opinions = 19 | | Opinions relating to orders = 1 | | In-chambers opinions = 0 |
| Unanimous opinions: 3 | | Most joined by: Scalia (13) | | Least joined by: O'Connor (2) |

| Type | Case | Citation | Issues | Joined by | Other opinions |
|---|---|---|---|---|---|
| | Wagnon v. Prairie Band Potawatomi Nation | 546 U.S. 95 (2005) | | Roberts, Stevens, O'Connor, Scalia, Souter, Breyer | Ginsburg |
| | Gonzales v. Oregon | 546 U.S. 243 (2006) | | | Kennedy; Scalia |
| | Central Virginia Community College v. Katz | 546 U.S. 356 (2006) | | Roberts, Scalia, Kennedy | Stevens |
| | Unitherm Food Systems, Inc. v. Swift-Eckrich, Inc. | 546 U.S. 394 (2006) | | Roberts, O'Connor, Scalia, Souter, Ginsburg, Breyer | Stevens |
Alito did not participate.
| | Buckeye Check Cashing, Inc. v. Cardegna | 546 U.S. 440 (2006) | Whether illegality of contract under state law precludes arbitration clause | | Scalia |
Thomas reiterated his belief that the Federal Arbitration Act does not preclude state law.
| | Dolan v. United States Postal Service | 546 U.S. 481 (2006) | Statutory immunity of USPS from suit | | Kennedy |
| | Texaco, Inc. v. Dagher | 547 U.S. 1 (2006) | antitrust • applicability to joint ventures | Unanimous | |
| | Georgia v. Randolph | 547 U.S. 103 (2006) | | | Souter; Stevens; Breyer; Roberts; Scalia |
| | Northern Ins. Co. of N.Y. v. Chatham County | 547 U.S. 189 (2006) | U.S. Const. amend. XI • Sovereign immunity of counties | Unanimous | |
| | Jones v. Flowers | 547 U.S. 220 (2006) | Due process • U.S. Const. amend. XIV • notice requirements to property owner prior to tax sale | Scalia, Kennedy | Roberts |
| | eBay Inc. v. MercExchange, L.L.C. | 547 U.S. 388 (2006) | patent law | Unanimous | Roberts; Kennedy |
| | Anza v. Ideal Steel Supply Corp. | 547 U.S. 451 (2006) | | | Kennedy; Scalia; Breyer |
Thomas also joined the majority in part.
| | Davis v. Washington | 547 U.S. 813 (2006) | | | Scalia |
| | Samson v. California | 547 U.S. 843 (2006) | | Roberts, Scalia, Kennedy, Ginsburg, Alito | Stevens |
| | Rangel-Reyes v. United States | 547 U.S. 1200 (2006) | Rights of the accused • U.S. Const. amend. VI • right to a jury trial | | Stevens |
Thomas dissented from the denial of certiorari, which he thought should be granted so the Court could rule that the fact of a prior conviction, when an element of a crime, should be decided by a jury. Thomas believed this exception to the Apprendi rule was not found within the Constitution itself, but only derived from prior precedent that a majority of the Court no longer supported. "The Court’s duty to resolve this matter is particularly compelling, because we are the only court authorized to do so. And until we do so, countless criminal defendants will be denied the full protection afforded by the Fifth and Sixth Amendments, notwithstanding the agreement of a majority of the Court that this result is unconstitutional. There is no good reason to allow such a state of affairs to persist."
| | Kansas v. Marsh | 548 U.S. 163 (2006) | death penalty | Roberts, Scalia, Kennedy, Alito | Scalia; Stevens; Souter |
| | Washington v. Recuenco | 548 U.S. 212 (2006) | | Roberts, Scalia, Kennedy, Souter, Breyer, Alito | Kennedy; Stevens; Ginsburg |
| | Randall v. Sorrell | 548 U.S. 230 (2006) | | Scalia | Breyer; Kennedy; Alito; Stevens; Souter |
| | Beard v. Banks | 548 U.S. 521 (2006) | | Scalia | Breyer; Stevens; Ginsburg |
| | Hamdan v. Rumsfeld | 548 U.S. 557 (2006) | Habeas corpus • presidential authority to try prisoners in military commissions | Scalia; Alito (in part) | Stevens; Kennedy; Breyer; Scalia; Alito |
