= 2005 term United States Supreme Court opinions of Anthony Kennedy =

The 2005 term of the Supreme Court of the United States began October 3, 2005, and concluded October 1, 2006. This was the nineteenth term of Associate Justice Anthony Kennedy's tenure on the Court.
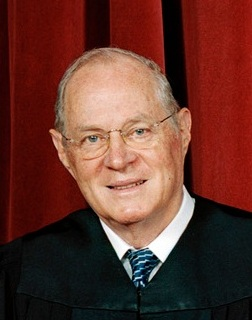

Anthony Kennedy 2005 term statistics

8	Majority or plurality	8	Concurrence	1	Other
3	Dissent	0	Concurrence/dissent	Total =	20
Bench opinions = 18		Opinions relating to orders = 1		In-chambers opinions = 1
Unanimous opinions: 2		Most joined by: Stevens, Souter (10)		Least joined by: O'Connor (2)

Type	Case	Citation	Issues	Joined by	Other opinions
	Gonzales v. Oregon	546 U.S. 243 (2006)	Controlled Substances Act • state assisted suicide law	Stevens, O'Connor, Souter, Ginsburg, Breyer	Scalia; Thomas
	Rice v. Collins	546 U.S. 333 (2006)		Unanimous	Breyer
	Dolan v. United States Postal Service	546 U.S. 481 (2006)	USPS immunity from suit	Roberts, Stevens, Scalia, Souter, Ginsburg, Breyer	Thomas
Kennedy wrote for the Court in ruling that the immunity that protected the U.S. Postal Service from liability for mishandling of mail did not apply to injuries caused when someone tripped over negligently deposited mail.
	eBay Inc. v. MercExchange, L.L.C.	547 U.S. 388 (2006)	patent law	Stevens, Souter, Breyer	Thomas; Roberts
	Garcetti v. Ceballos	547 U.S. 410 (2006)		Roberts, Scalia, Thomas, Alito	Stevens; Souter; Breyer
	Anza v. Ideal Steel Supply Corp.	547 U.S. 451 (2006)		Roberts, Stevens, Scalia, Souter, Ginsburg, Alito; Thomas (in part)	Scalia; Thomas; Breyer
	House v. Bell	547 U.S. 518 (2006)		Stevens, Souter, Ginsburg, Breyer	Roberts
	Hill v. McDonough	547 U.S. 573 (2006)	death penalty	Unanimous	
Kennedy wrote for the Court in ruling that a death row prisoner's Eighth Amendment challenge to the method of execution was not a habeas corpus petition, but instead stated a claim under 42 U.S.C. §1983 for violation of the Eighth Amendment's prohibition against cruel and unusual punishment. Accordingly, his claim could not be barred by his previously filed petition for habeas relief.
	Hudson v. Michigan	547 U.S. 586 (2006)	Rights of the accused • searches and seizures		Scalia; Breyer
	Howard Delivery Serv. v. Zurich American Ins. Co.	547 U.S. 651 (2006)		Souter, Alito	Ginsburg
	Rapanos v. United States	547 U.S. 715 (2006)			Scalia; Roberts; Stevens; Breyer
	Youngblood v. West Virginia	547 U.S. 867 (2006)			per curiam; Scalia
	Padilla v. Hanft	547 U.S. 1062 (2006)		Roberts, Stevens	Ginsburg
Kennedy filed an opinion concurring in the Court's denial of certiorari, to explain his vote.
	Dixon v. United States	548 U.S. 1 (2006)			Stevens; Alito; Breyer
	Washington v. Recuenco	548 U.S. 212 (2006)			Thomas; Stevens; Ginsburg
	Randall v. Sorrell	548 U.S. 230 (2006)			Breyer; Thomas; Alito; Stevens; Souter
	League of United Latin American Citizens v. Perry	548 U.S. 399 (2006)	Electoral redistricting	Roberts, Stevens, Souter, Ginsburg, Breyer, Alito (in part)	Roberts; Stevens; Scalia; Souter; Breyer
	Hamdan v. Rumsfeld	548 U.S. 557 (2006)		Souter, Ginsburg, Breyer (in part)	Stevens; Breyer; Scalia; Thomas; Alito
	Clark v. Arizona	548 U.S. 735 (2006)		Stevens, Ginsburg	Souter; Breyer
	San Diegans for Mt. Soledad Nat. War Memorial v. Paulson	548 U.S. 1301 (2006)	Establishment Clause		
Kennedy granted the city's motion for a stay pending appeal of an order to remove a monumental Christian cross from city property.
