= 2005 term United States Supreme Court opinions of Ruth Bader Ginsburg =

The 2005 term of the Supreme Court of the United States began October 3, 2005, and concluded October 1, 2006. This was the thirteenth term of Associate Justice Ruth Bader Ginsburg's tenure on the Court.
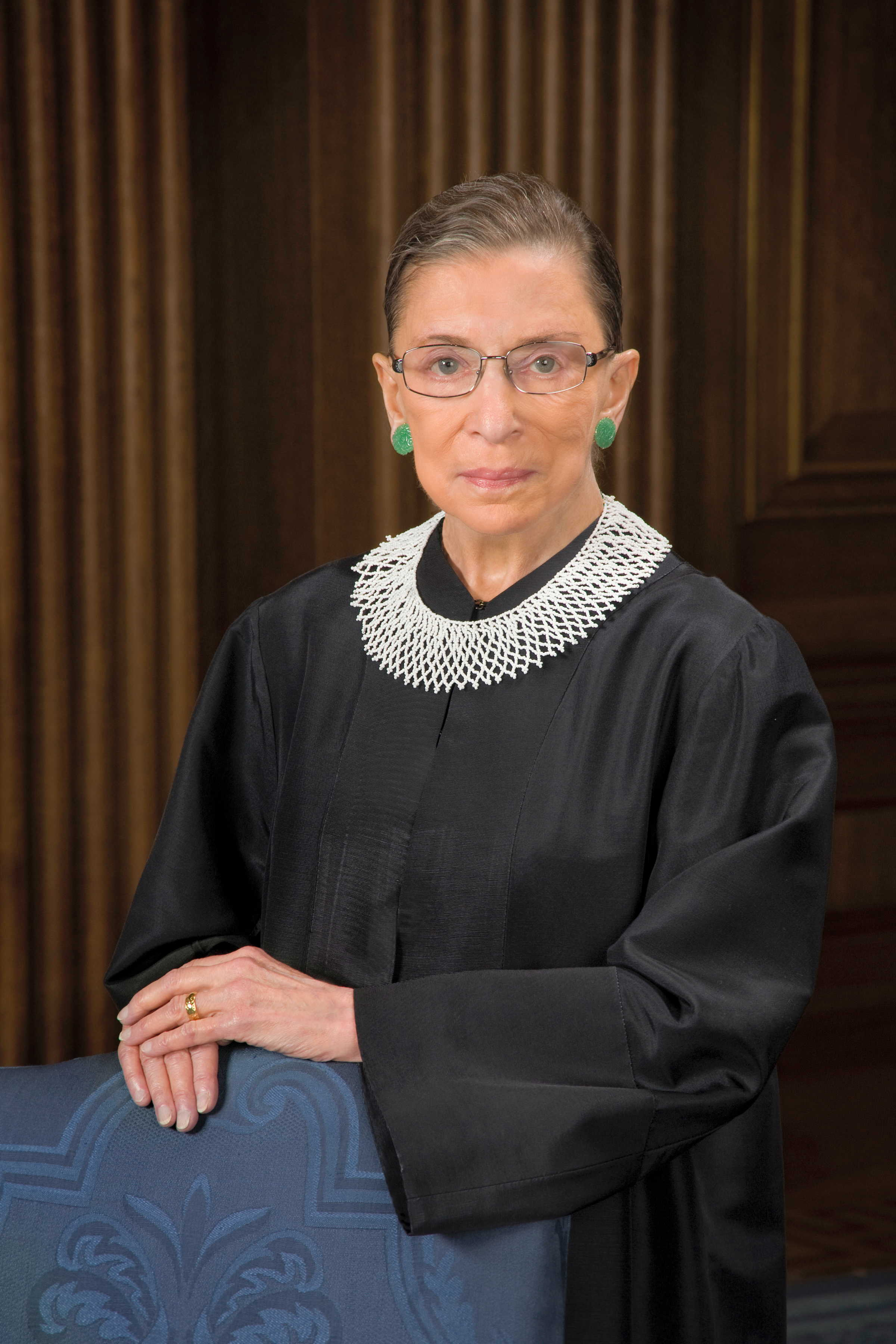

Ruth Bader Ginsburg 2005 term statistics

8	Majority or plurality	4	Concurrence	1	Other
6	Dissent	0	Concurrence/dissent	Total =	19
Bench opinions = 17		Opinions relating to orders = 1		In-chambers opinions = 1
Unanimous opinions: 3		Most joined by: Roberts (8)		Least joined by: Alito (2)

Type	Case	Citation	Issues	Joined by	Other opinions
	Schaffer v. Weast	546 U.S. 49 (2005)	Individuals with Disabilities Education Act • individualized education program challenges • burden of proof		O'Connor; Stevens; Breyer
	Lincoln Property Co. v. Roche	546 U.S. 81 (2005)		Unanimous	
	Wagnon v. Prairie Band Potawatomi Nation	546 U.S. 95 (2005)		Kennedy	Thomas
	Volvo Trucks North America v. Reeder-Simco GMC	546 U.S. 164 (2006)		Roberts, O'Connor, Scalia, Kennedy, Souter, Breyer	Stevens
	Wachovia Bank, N. A. v. Schmidt	546 U.S. 303 (2006)		Roberts, Stevens, O'Connor, Scalia, Kennedy, Souter, Breyer	
Thomas did not participate.
	Lance v. Dennis	546 U.S. 459 (2006)	legislative redistricting • preclusion • Full Faith and Credit Clause	Souter	per curiam; Stevens
	Arbaugh v. Y & H Corp.	546 U.S. 500 (2006)	employment discrimination • Civil Rights Act of 1964	Roberts, Stevens, Scalia, Kennedy, Souter, Thomas, Breyer	
Alito did not participate.
	Doe v. Gonzales	546 U.S. 1301 (2006)	First Amendment • freedom of speech		
Ginsburg denied an emergency application to vacate the lower court's stay.
	Day v. McDonough	547 U.S. 198 (2006)	habeas corpus	Roberts, Kennedy, Souter, Alito	Stevens; Scalia
	Hartman v. Moore	547 U.S. 250 (2006)	causation • burden of proof • retaliatory prosecution	Breyer	Souter
	Marshall v. Marshall	547 U.S. 293 (2006)	bankruptcy • jurisdiction • tort	Roberts, Scalia, Kennedy, Souter, Thomas, Breyer, Alito	Stevens
	DaimlerChrysler Corp. v. Cuno	547 U.S. 332 (2006)	taxpayer standing • Article III		Roberts
	Howard Delivery Serv. v. Zurich American Ins. Co.	547 U.S. 651 (2006)		Roberts, Stevens, Scalia, Thomas, Breyer	Kennedy
	Empire HealthChoice Assurance, Inc. v. McVeigh	547 U.S. 677 (2006)		Roberts, Stevens, Scalia, Thomas	Breyer
	Washington v. Recuenco	547 U.S. 212 (2006)		Stevens	Thomas; Kennedy; Stevens
	Arlington Central School Dist. Bd. of Ed. v. Murphy	547 U.S. 291 (2006)	Individuals with Disabilities Education Act		Alito; Souter; Breyer
	Padilla v. Hanft	547 U.S. 1062 (2006)			Kennedy
Ginsburg dissented from the Court's denial of certiorari.
	Sanchez-Llamas v. Oregon	548 U.S. 331 (2006)	exclusionary rule • international law		Roberts; Breyer
	Beard v. Banks	548 U.S. 521 (2006)	First Amendment • prisoners' rights		Breyer; Thomas; Stevens
