= 2005 term United States Supreme Court opinions of Antonin Scalia =

The 2005 term of the Supreme Court of the United States began October 3, 2005, and concluded October 1, 2006. This was the twentieth term of Associate Justice Antonin Scalia's tenure on the Court.
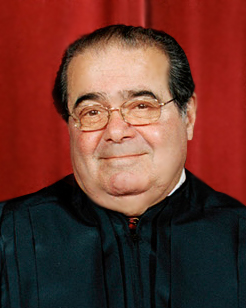

Antonin Scalia 2005 term statistics

9	Majority or plurality	7	Concurrence	0	Other
5	Dissent	1	Concurrence/dissent	Total =	22
Bench opinions = 21		Opinions relating to orders = 1		In-chambers opinions = 0
Unanimous opinions: 1		Most joined by: Thomas (12)		Least joined by: O'Connor (2)

Type	Case	Citation	Issues	Joined by	Other opinions
	Lockhart v. United States	546 U.S. 142 (2005)	Debt Collection Act of 1982 • Social Security • student loan debt		O'Connor
	United States v. Georgia	546 U.S. 151 (2006)		Unanimous	Stevens
	Brown v. Sanders	546 U.S. 212 (2006)		Roberts, O'Connor, Kennedy, Thomas	Stevens; Breyer
	Gonzales v. Oregon	546 U.S. 243 (2006)	Controlled Substances Act	Roberts, Thomas	Kennedy; Thomas
	Buckeye Check Cashing, Inc. v. Cardegna	546 U.S. 440 (2006)		Roberts, Stevens, Kennedy, Souter, Ginsburg, Breyer	Thomas
	Domino's Pizza, Inc. v. McDonald	546 U.S. 470 (2006)	Civil Rights Act	Roberts, Stevens, Kennedy, Souter, Thomas, Ginsburg, Breyer	
The Court ruled that the Civil Rights Act's protection of the right to make contracts free from racial discrimination did not extend to agents of the contractors, only those who would have enforceable rights under the contracts. Alito did not participate.
	Oregon v. Guzek	546 U.S. 517 (2006)		Thomas	Breyer
	United States v. Grubbs	547 U.S. 90 (2006)		Roberts, Kennedy, Thomas; Stevens, Souter, Ginsburg (in part)	Souter
	Georgia v. Randolph	547 U.S. 103 (2006)			Souter; Stevens; Breyer; Roberts; Thomas
	Day v. McDonough	547 U.S. 198 (2006)	Habeas corpus • Anti-Terrorism and Effective Death Penalty Act	Thomas, Breyer	Ginsburg; Stevens
Scalia's dissent objected that the Court's affirmance of a district court's sua sponte dismissal of a habeas petition as untimely disregarded the clear provisions of the Federal Rules of Civil Procedure (FRCP), which required the forfeiture of affirmative defenses when they are not raised. Scalia argued that if there was truly no "dispositive difference" as the Court said between a court allowing the State to amend its answer to include the limitations argument and dismissing sua sponte, "the natural conclusion would be that there is no compelling reason to disregard the Civil Rules. Legislatively enacted rules are surely entitled to more respect than this apparent presumption that, when nothing substantial hangs on the point, they do not apply as written." At a minimum, Scalia believed it "a nontrivial value in itself" to "observe[] the formalities of our adversary system" by requiring the State to amend its own pleading. Scalia also observed that in contrast to the "novel regime" adopted by the majority, there is already a well-developed body of law regarding whether a party should have leave to amend a pleading. "Ockham is offended by today's decision, even if no one else is."
	Anza v. Ideal Steel Supply Corp.	547 U.S. 451 (2006)			Kennedy; Thomas; Breyer
	Zedner v. United States	547 U.S. 489 (2006)			Alito
Scalia joined Alito's unanimous decision ruling that a criminal defendant cannot prospectively waive the protections of the Speedy Trial Act of 1974, except as to the part addressing the Act's legislative history. Scalia filed a separate concurrence to restate his objections to that method of statutory interpretation.
	Hudson v. Michigan	547 U.S. 586 (2006)		Roberts, Thomas, Alito; Kennedy (in part)	Kennedy; Breyer
	Kircher v. Putnam Funds Trust	547 U.S. 633 (2006)			Souter
	Rapanos v. United States	547 U.S. 715 (2006)	Clean Water Act	Roberts, Thomas, Alito	Roberts; Kennedy; Stevens; Breyer
	Davis v. Washington	547 U.S. 813 (2006)		Roberts, Stevens, Kennedy, Souter, Ginsburg, Breyer, Alito	Thomas
	Youngblood v. West Virginia	547 U.S. 867 (2006)		Thomas	per curiam; Kennedy
	Fidelity Federal Bank & Trust v. Kehoe	547 U.S. 1051 (2006)		Alito	
Scalia concurred in the Court's denial of certiorari.
	United States v. Gonzalez-Lopez	548 U.S. 140 (2006)	U.S. Const. amend. VI • right to counsel	Stevens, Souter, Ginsburg, Breyer	Alito
	Kansas v. Marsh	548 U.S. 163 (2006)	U.S. Const. amend. VIII • death penalty • balance of mitigating and aggravating sentencing factors		Thomas; Stevens; Souter
	League of United Latin American Citizens v. Perry	548 U.S. 399 (2006)	legislative redistricting	Thomas; Roberts, Alito (in part)	Kennedy; Roberts; Stevens; Souter; Breyer
	Hamdan v. Rumsfeld	548 U.S. 557 (2006)		Thomas, Alito	Stevens; Kennedy; Breyer; Thomas; Alito
Scalia also joined Thomas' dissent, and Alito's dissent in part.
