= 2005 term United States Supreme Court opinions of David Souter =

The 2005 term of the Supreme Court of the United States began October 3, 2005, and concluded October 1, 2006. This was the sixteenth term of Associate Justice David Souter's tenure on the Court.
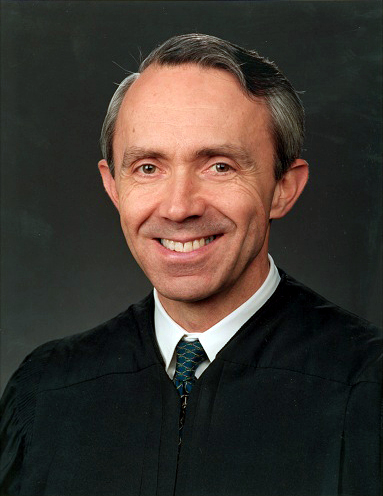

David Souter 2005 term statistics

7	Majority or plurality	1	Concurrence	0	Other
4	Dissent	1	Concurrence/dissent	Total =	13
Bench opinions = 13		Opinions relating to orders = 0		In-chambers opinions = 0
Unanimous opinions: 0		Most joined by: Ginsburg (10)		Least joined by: O'Connor (1)

Type	Case	Citation	Issues	Joined by	Other opinions
	Will v. Hallock	546 U.S. 345 (2006)		Unanimous	
	United States v. Grubbs	547 U.S. 90 (2006)		Stevens, Ginsburg	Scalia
	Georgia v. Randolph	547 U.S. 103 (2006)		Stevens, Kennedy, Ginsburg, Breyer	Stevens; Breyer; Roberts; Scalia; Thomas
	Hartman v. Moore	547 U.S. 250 (2006)		Stevens, Scalia, Kennedy, Thomas	Ginsburg
	S. D. Warren Co. v. Maine Bd. of Env. Protection	547 U.S. 370 (2006)		Roberts, Stevens, Kennedy, Thomas, Ginsburg, Breyer, Alito; Scalia (in part)	
	Garcetti v. Ceballos	547 U.S. 410 (2006)		Stevens, Ginsburg	Kennedy; Stevens; Breyer
	Kircher v. Putnam Funds Trust	547 U.S. 633 (2006)		Roberts, Stevens, Kennedy, Thomas, Ginsburg, Breyer, Alito; Scalia (in part)	Scalia
	Fernandez-Vargas v. Gonzales	548 U.S. 30 (2006)		Roberts, Scalia, Kennedy, Thomas, Ginsburg, Breyer, Alito	Stevens
	Kansas v. Marsh	548 U.S. 163 (2006)	death penalty	Stevens, Ginsburg, Breyer	Thomas; Scalia; Stevens
	Randall v. Sorrell	548 U.S. 230 (2006)		Ginsburg; Stevens (in part)	Breyer; Kennedy; Thomas; Alito; Stevens
	Arlington Central School Dist. Bd. of Ed. v. Murphy	548 U.S. 291 (2006)			Alito; Ginsburg; Breyer
	League of United Latin American Citizens v. Perry	548 U.S. 399 (2006)	electoral redistricting	Ginsburg	Kennedy; Roberts; Stevens; Scalia; Breyer
	Clark v. Arizona	548 U.S. 735 (2006)	admission of mental defect evidence	Roberts, Scalia, Thomas, Alito; Breyer (in part)	Kennedy; Breyer
