= 2005 term United States Supreme Court opinions of Samuel Alito =

The 2005 term of the Supreme Court of the United States began October 3, 2005, and concluded October 1, 2006. This was the first term of Associate Justice Samuel Alito's tenure on the Court.
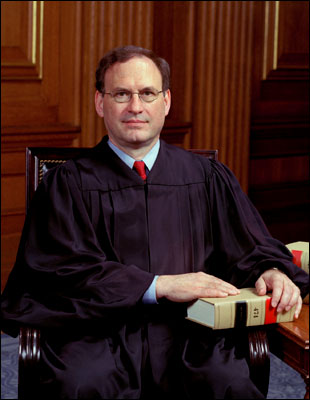

Samuel Alito 2005 term statistics

4	Majority or plurality	3	Concurrence	0	Other
2	Dissent	0	Concurrence/dissent	Total =	9
Bench opinions = 9		Opinions relating to orders = 0		In-chambers opinions = 0
Unanimous opinions: 1		Most joined by: Scalia, Thomas (6)		Least joined by: Stevens, Souter, Ginsburg, Breyer (2)

Type	Case	Citation	Issues	Joined by	Other opinions
	Holmes v. South Carolina	547 U.S. 319 (2006)	Rights of the accused • right to present evidence of third-party guilt	Unanimous	
Alito's first opinion on the Court ruled that it was unconstitutional for a criminal defendant's evidence of third-party guilt to be excluded based only on the strength of the prosecution's case. This standard was irrational because whether the prosecution's evidence was strong had no logical bearing on the reliability and probative value of the defendant's proffered evidence.
	Zedner v. United States	547 U.S. 489 (2006)	Rights of the accused • Speedy Trial Act	Roberts, Stevens, Kennedy, Souter, Thomas, Ginsburg, Breyer; Scalia (in part)	Scalia
Alito's unanimous decision ruled that a criminal defendant cannot prospectively waive the protections of the Speedy Trial Act of 1974. Justice Scalia declined to join the portion of Alito's opinion addressing the Act's legislative history, and wrote a separate concurrence criticizing that method of statutory interpretation.
	Dixon v. United States	548 U.S. 1 (2006)	Federal firearms law • rights of the accused • burden of proof on defense of duress	Scalia	Stevens; Kennedy; Breyer
Alito concurred in the Court's opinion and in its 7-2 judgment that a defendant charged with the federal crime of receiving a firearm while under indictment had the burden of proving the affirmative defense of duress. Alito wrote separately to express his understanding that the allocation of the burden would not vary from one federal criminal statute to another. The defendant had the burden at common law, and Alito did not believe Congress reassessed the burden with every new statutory enactment so that the allocation would impliedly follow the current legal trends.
	Burlington, N. & S. F. R. Co. v. White	548 U.S. 53 (2006)	Civil rights • Title VII		Breyer
Alito concurred in the Court's judgment, but disagreed with its reasoning.
	Woodford v. Ngo	548 U.S. 81 (2006)	prisoners' rights • Prison Litigation Reform Act	Roberts, Scalia, Kennedy, Thomas	Breyer; Stevens
Alito's majority opinion ruled that the Prison Litigation Reform Act required administrative remedies to be properly exhausted before prison conditions could be challenged in federal court. Remedies that were unavailable only because they were time-barred were not properly exhausted.
	United States v. Gonzalez-Lopez	548 U.S. 140 (2006)	Rights of the accused • Sixth Amendment • right to counsel	Roberts, Kennedy, Thomas	Scalia
Alito's first dissent on the Court argued that the Court had misinterpreted the Sixth Amendment's protection of the right to counsel to protect a defendant's choice of counsel, when he believed the text and history of the Amendment indicated that it merely protected a defendant's right to assistance that was as effective as his choice of counsel would be. Even if it protected choice of counsel, it did not mean that violation of this right should be grounds for automatic reversal. Instead, because the Constitution lacked directives as to how such rights should be enforced, the Court should follow the Congressional directive to apply harmless error analysis.
	Randall v. Sorrell	548 U.S. 230 (2006)	First Amendment • free speech • campaign finance reform		Breyer; Kennedy; Thomas; Stevens; Souter
Alito concurred in the Court's judgment, and concurred in the plurality's opinion in part.
	Arlington Central School Dist. Bd. of Ed. v. Murphy	548 U.S. 291 (2006)	Civil rights • Individuals with Disabilities Education Act	Roberts, Scalia, Kennedy, Thomas	Ginsburg; Souter; Breyer
Alito wrote the five-justice majority for a 6–3 decision that prevailing parents under the Individuals with Disabilities Education Act were not entitled to an award of expert witness fees. Justices Souter and Breyer filed dissenting opinions.
	Hamdan v. Rumsfeld	548 U.S. 557 (2006)		Scalia, Thomas (in part)	Stevens; Kennedy; Breyer; Scalia; Thomas
Alito also joined Scalia's dissent, and Thomas' in part.
