= 2005 term United States Supreme Court opinions of John Roberts =

The 2005 term of the Supreme Court of the United States began October 3, 2005, and concluded October 1, 2006. This was the first term of Chief Justice John Roberts's tenure on the Court.
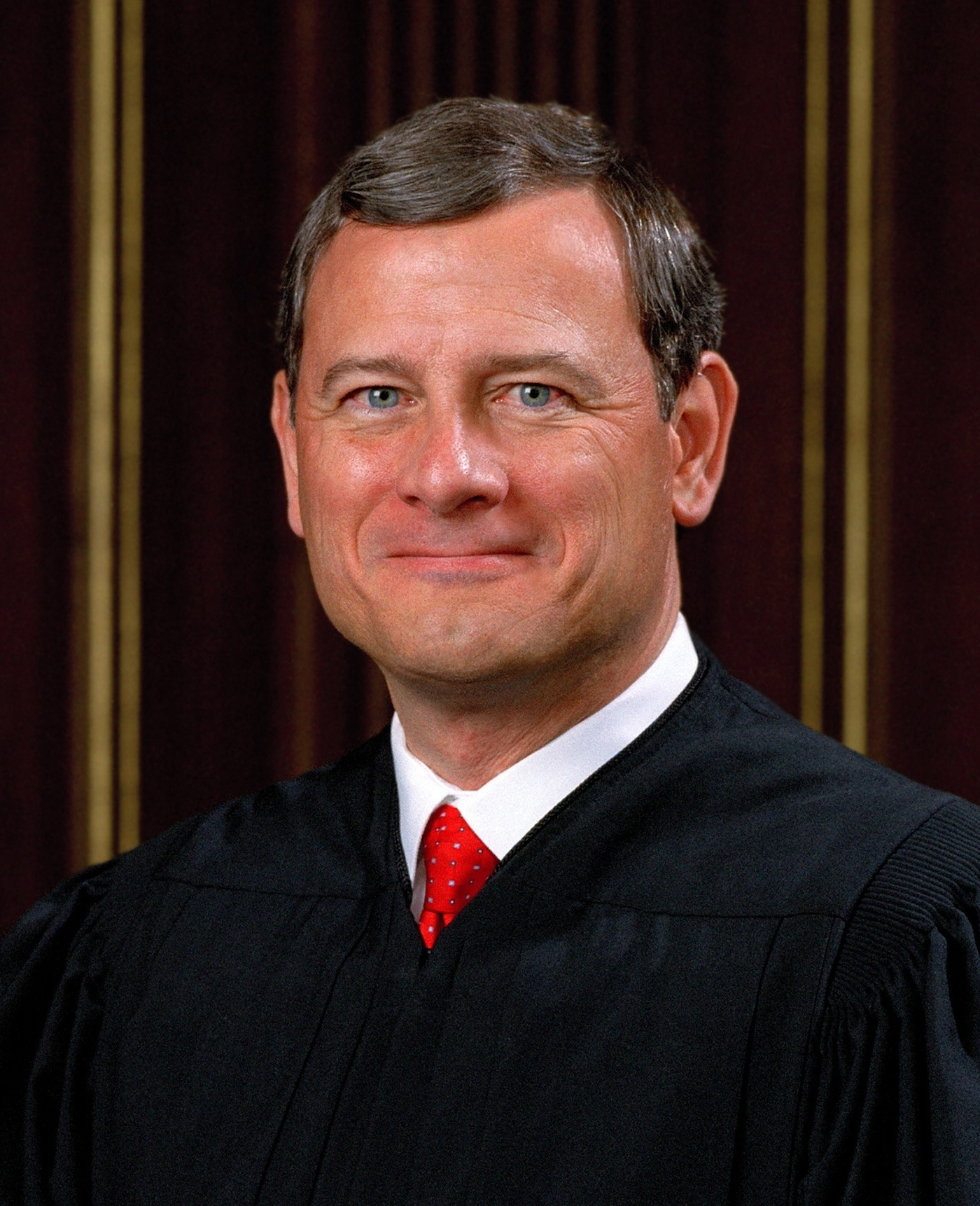

John Roberts 2005 term statistics

8	Majority or plurality	2	Concurrence	0	Other
1	Dissent	2	Concurrence/dissent	Total =	13
Bench opinions = 13		Opinions relating to orders = 0		In-chambers opinions = 0
Unanimous opinions: 5		Most joined by: Scalia (10)		Least joined by: O'Connor (1)

Type	Case	Citation	Issues	Joined by	Other opinions
	Martin v. Franklin Capital Corp.	546 U.S. 132 (2005)		Unanimous	
	Gonzales v. O Centro Espírita Beneficente União do Vegetal	546 U.S. 418 (2006)	Religious Freedom Restoration Act • statutory interpretation	Unanimous	
Roberts' opinion, which was unanimous as to the eight justices participating, ruled that a church was properly granted an injunction under the Religious Freedom Restoration Act against criminal prosecution for its sacramental use of a hallucinatory substance, because the federal government had failed to demonstrate a compelling interest in prohibiting that use under the Controlled Substances Act.
	Rumsfeld v. Forum for Academic and Institutional Rights, Inc.	547 U.S. 47 (2006)	First Amendment • conditions on government funding • compelled speech • Homosexuality in the U.S. military • Solomon Amendment	Unanimous	
Roberts' opinion, which was unanimous as to the eight justices participating, ruled that the government could constitutionally deny federal funds to universities that do not permit the military to recruit on their campuses because of their objection to the military's exclusion of homosexuals. Roberts wrote that the Solomon Amendment neither denies the institutions the right to speak, nor requires them to say anything. He further believed that Congress, through the "raise and support Armies" clause, could even directly force schools to allow recruiting without threatening the withholding of funds, if they so desired, and that, as a result, no question of "unconstitutional conditions" arises.
	Georgia v. Randolph	547 U.S. 103 (2006)	Fourth Amendment	Scalia	Souter; Stevens; Breyer; Scalia; Thomas
Roberts' first written dissent on the Court was from Souter's 5–4 ruling barring warrantless searches where a physically present occupant refuses entry to police despite the consent of a co-occupant. Roberts was concerned that this rule would limit the ability of police to address spousal abuse. He noted that the purpose of the Fourth Amendment was to protect individual privacy, but that any person who shares a dwelling (or, as Roberts pointed out, a locker or a hard drive) with another person may anticipate that the other person sharing access to their belongings might turn them over to authorities. Roberts believed that the majority's judgment was arbitrary in light of prior decisions, which had held that police could ignore the objections of a resident who was being held in a police car rather than in the house.
	Jones v. Flowers	547 U.S. 220 (2006)	Fourteenth Amendment • due process • enforcement of property taxes	Stevens, Souter, Ginsburg, Breyer	Thomas
Roberts' 5-4 majority opinion held that a state was required to take additional reasonable steps to notify a homeowner of a pending tax sale to satisfy overdue property taxes, when the state knew its previous attempt at notice had failed when the certified mailing was returned unclaimed. Roberts satirized the state's position by analogy, stating that "[i]f the [Tax] Commissioner prepared a stack of letters to mail to delinquent taxpayers, handed them to the postman, and then watched as the departing postman accidentally dropped the letters down a storm drain, one would certainly expect the Commissioner's office to prepare a new stack of letters and send them again. No one desirous of actually informing the owners would simply shrug his shoulders as the letters disappeared and say 'I tried.'"
	DaimlerChrysler Corp. v. Cuno	547 U.S. 332 (2006)	Article Three • standing	Stevens, Scalia, Kennedy, Souter, Thomas, Breyer, Alito	Ginsburg
Roberts' 8-justice majority, the judgment of which Ginsburg concurred in, ruled that state residents did not have standing to challenge state taxation and spending decisions simply by virtue of their status as taxpayers.
	Sereboff v. Mid Atlantic Medical Services, Inc.	547 U.S. 356 (2006)	ERISA	Unanimous	
	eBay Inc. v. MercExchange, L.L.C.	547 U.S. 388 (2006)	Patent	Scalia, Ginsburg	Thomas; Kennedy
	Brigham City v. Stuart	547 U.S. 398 (2006)	Fourth Amendment • exceptions to warrant requirement • exigent circumstances	Unanimous	Stevens
Roberts' unanimous opinion ruled that police may enter a home without a warrant when they have an objectively reasonable basis for believing that an occupant is seriously injured or imminently threatened with such injury.
	House v. Bell	547 U.S. 518 (2006)		Scalia, Thomas	Kennedy
	Rapanos v. United States	547 U.S. 715 (2006)	Clean Water Act		Scalia; Kennedy; Stevens; Breyer
Roberts joined Scalia's plurality supporting an interpretation of the Clean Water Act that restricted its application to land directly connected to waterways. He wrote a separate concurrence to express his disappointment that lower courts would have no guidance on how to resolve the issue because of the Court's failure to establish a majority.
	Sanchez-Llamas v. Oregon	548 U.S. 331 (2006)		Scalia, Kennedy, Thomas, Alito	Ginsburg; Breyer
	League of United Latin American Citizens v. Perry	548 U.S. 399 (2006)	Voting Rights Act	Alito	Kennedy; Stevens; Scalia; Souter; Breyer
