= 2005 term United States Supreme Court opinions of Sandra Day O'Connor =

The 2005 term of the Supreme Court of the United States began October 3, 2005, and concluded October 1, 2006. This was the twenty-fifth and final term of Associate Justice Sandra Day O'Connor's tenure on the Court; O'Connor retired on January 31, 2006.
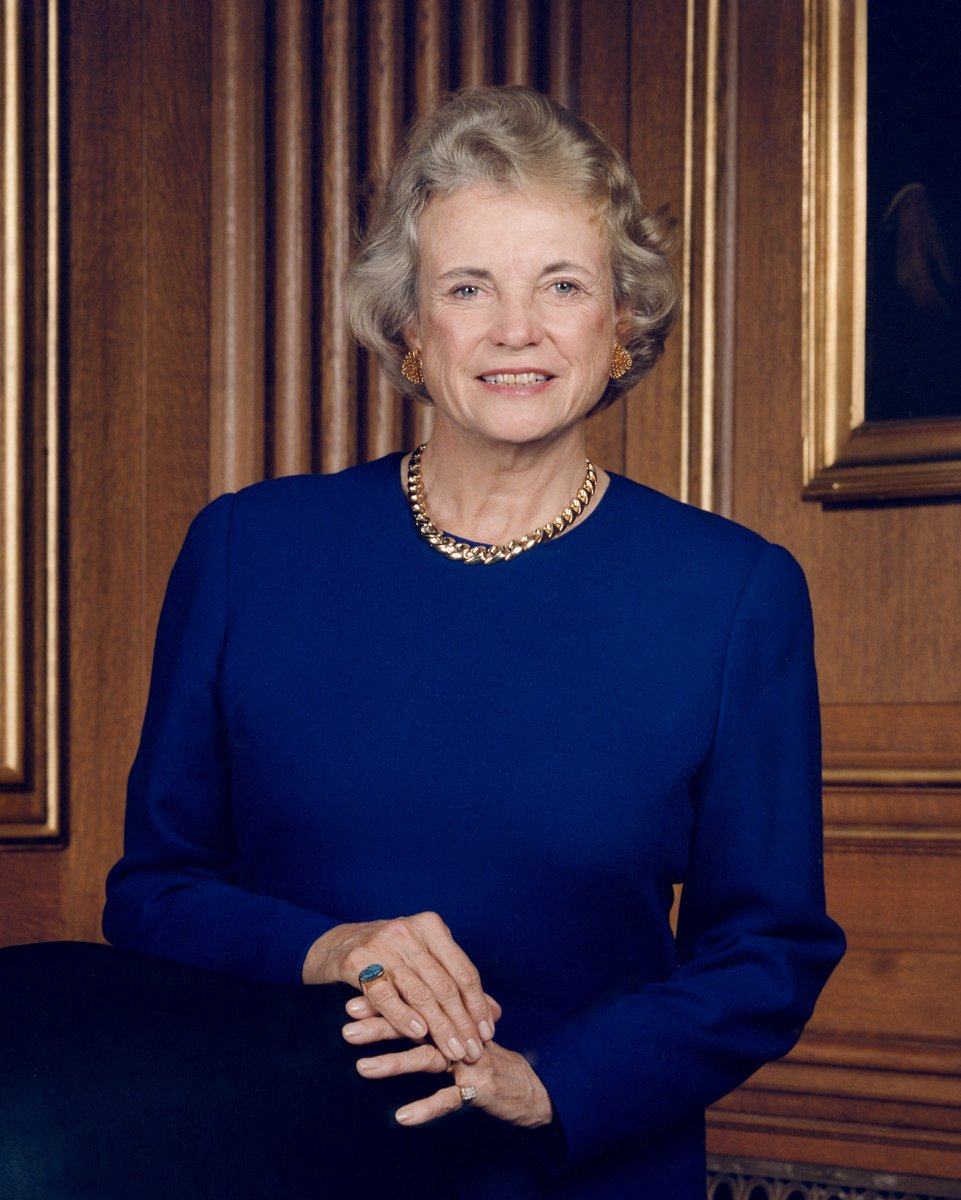

Sandra Day O'Connor 2005 term statistics

3	Majority or plurality	0	Concurrence	0	Other
0	Dissent	0	Concurrence/dissent	Total =	3
Bench opinions = 3		Opinions relating to orders = 0		In-chambers opinions = 0
Unanimous opinions: 2		Most joined by: Stevens, Scalia, Kennedy, Souter, Thomas (3)		Least joined by: Roberts, Ginsburg, Breyer (2)

Type	Case	Citation	Issues	Joined by	Other opinions
	Schaffer v. Weast	546 U.S. 49 (2005)	Individuals with Disabilities Education Act • individualized education program challenges • burden of proof	Stevens, Scalia, Kennedy, Souter, Thomas	Stevens; Ginsburg; Breyer
	Lockhart v. United States	546 U.S. 142 (2005)	Debt Collection Act of 1982 • Social Security • student loan debt	Unanimous	Scalia
	Ayotte v. Planned Parenthood	546 U.S. 320 (2005)	abortion • parental notification • facial challenge	Unanimous	
O'Connor's opinion for the Court vacated and remanded the First Circuit's judgment that New Hampshire's parental notification law was unconstitutional, but avoided a substantive ruling on the challenged law or a reconsideration of prior Supreme Court abortion precedent. Instead, the Court only addressed the issue of remedy, holding that invalidating a statute in its entirety "is not always necessary or justified, for lower courts may be able to render narrower declaratory and injunctive relief."
