= Howard Delivery Service, Inc. v. Zurich American Insurance Co. =

- Supreme Court of the United States

Decided June 15, 2006
- Full case name: Howard Delivery Service, Inc. v. Zurich American Insurance Co.
- Citations: 547 U.S. 651 (more)

Holding
- A creditor cannot seek priority status in a bankruptcy case to recover unpaid premiums owed for legally-required workers' compensation insurance.

Court membership
- Chief Justice John Roberts Associate Justices John P. Stevens · Antonin Scalia; Anthony Kennedy · David Souter; Clarence Thomas · Ruth Bader Ginsburg; Stephen Breyer · Samuel Alito

Case opinions
- Majority: Ginsburg, joined by Roberts, Stevens, Scalia, Thomas, Breyer
- Dissent: Kennedy, joined by Souter, Alito

Howard Delivery Service, Inc. v. Zurich American Insurance Co., 547 U.S. 651 (2006), was a United States Supreme Court case in which the court held that a creditor cannot seek priority status in a bankruptcy case to recover unpaid premiums owed for legally-required workers' compensation insurance.

== Background ==
The Bankruptcy Code accords priorities, among unsecured creditors' claims, for unpaid "wages, salaries, or commissions" in 11 U.S.C. §507(a)(4), and for unpaid contributions to "an employee benefit plan" in §507(a)(5). Howard Delivery Service, Inc. (Howard), was required by each state in which it operated to maintain workers' compensation coverage to secure its employees' receipt of health, disability, and death benefits in the event of on-the-job accidents. Howard contracted with Zurich American Insurance Co. (Zurich) to provide this insurance for Howard's operations in ten states. After Howard filed a Chapter 11 bankruptcy petition, Zurich filed an unsecured creditor's claim for some $400,000 in premiums, asserting that they qualified as "contributions to an employee benefit plan" entitled to priority under §507(a)(5). The Bankruptcy Court denied priority status to the claim, reasoning that because overdue premiums do not qualify as bargained-for benefits furnished in lieu of increased wages, they fall outside §507(a)(5)'s compass. The federal District Court affirmed, similarly determining that unpaid workers' compensation premiums do not share the priority provided for unpaid contributions to employee pension and health plans. A Fourth Circuit Court of Appeals panel reversed without agreeing on a rationale.

The Supreme Court granted certiorari.

== Opinion of the court ==
The Supreme Court issued an opinion on June 15, 2006.
