= Northern Insurance Co. of New York v. Chatham County =

Northern Insurance Company of New York v. Chatham County
- Supreme Court of the United States

Argued March 1, 2006 Decided April 25, 2006
- Full case name: Northern Insurance Company of New York v. Chatham County, Georgia
- Citations: 547 U.S. 189 (more) 126 S. Ct. 1689; 164 L. Ed. 2d 367; 2006 U.S. LEXIS 3449; 74 U.S.L.W. 4192; 2006 AMC 913; 19 Fla. L. Weekly Fed. S 151

Case history
- Prior: Summary judgment granted to defendant, Zurich Ins. Co. v. Chatham County, S.D. Ga. (No. 03-099); affirmed, 129 Fed. Appx. 602 (11th Cir. 2005); cert. granted, 126 S. Ct. 415 (2005), amended by 126 S. Ct. 477 (2005).

Holding
- A county that was not acting as an "arm of the state" did not have sovereign immunity from lawsuits authorized by federal law.

Court membership
- Chief Justice John Roberts Associate Justices John P. Stevens · Antonin Scalia; Anthony Kennedy · David Souter; Clarence Thomas · Ruth Bader Ginsburg; Stephen Breyer · Samuel Alito

Case opinion
- Majority: Thomas, joined by unanimous

Laws applied
- U.S. Const. amend. XI

Northern Insurance Company of New York v. Chatham County, 547 U.S. 189 (2006), is a United States Supreme Court case addressing whether state counties enjoyed sovereign immunity from private lawsuits authorized by federal law. The case involved an admiralty claim by an insurer against Chatham County, Georgia for its negligent operation of a drawbridge. The Court ruled unanimously that the county had no basis for claiming immunity because it was not acting as an "arm of the state."

Except for per curiams, this was the first Supreme Court decision in which Justice Samuel Alito participated.

== Background ==
Chatham County, Georgia owned, operated, and maintained the Causton Bluff Bridge, a drawbridge over the Wilmington River. On October 6, 2002, James Ludwig requested that the bridge be raised to allow his boat to pass. The bridge malfunctioned, and a section fell and collided with Ludwig's boat, causing damages in excess of $130,000. The Ludwigs submitted a claim for those damages to their insurer, Zurich Insurance, which paid in accordance with the terms of their insurance policy.

=== District Court proceedings ===
Zurich then sought to recover the costs of the Ludwigs' claim by filing suit in admiralty against the county in the United States District Court for the Southern District of Georgia. The District Court granted the County's motion for summary judgment on the ground that the suit was barred by sovereign immunity. Though the County conceded that Eleventh Amendment immunity did not extend to counties, it nonetheless contended that it was immune under "the universal rule of state immunity from suit without the state's consent." The District Court agreed, relying on the Fifth Circuit case Broward County v. Wickman to conclude that sovereign immunity extends to counties and municipalities that, as here, "exercise power delegated from the State."

=== Court of Appeals decision and petition for certiorari ===
The Eleventh Circuit, which was bound to follow Wickman as Circuit precedent, affirmed. The court acknowledged that the county could not assert an Eleventh Amendment immunity defense because, under Circuit precedent, the county did not qualify as an arm of the state. However, the court nonetheless concluded that a "residual immunity" had been carved out by American common law that protected political subdivisions such as Chatham County.

The Supreme Court granted certiorari to consider "whether an entity that does not qualify as an 'arm of the State' for Eleventh Amendment purposes can nonetheless assert sovereign immunity as a defense to an admiralty suit." The U.S. Solicitor General was granted leave to participate in oral argument, and argued for the county's immunity.

== Opinion of the Court ==
Justice Clarence Thomas delivered the Court's unanimous opinion, which reversed the decision of the Eleventh Circuit. The Court ruled that the county was not entitled to immunity from Northern's suit because it had failed to demonstrate that it was acting as an "arm of the state" when it operated the bridge.

The Court first observed that states retained the sovereign immunity they enjoyed prior to ratification of the Constitution except to the extent altered by the Constitution itself or its amendments. Accordingly, the phrase "Eleventh Amendment immunity" was merely a "convenient shorthand," because the amendment itself was not the source of the sovereign immunity of the states. The relevant consequence of this was that only states and "arms of the state" possessed immunity from suits authorized by federal law. The Court had repeatedly refused to extend sovereign immunity to municipalities (of which counties are a class), even when they exercised delegated state power.

The county argued that Court precedent had recognized a more expansive "residual" immunity than that applied in the Eleventh Amendment context. The Court, however, asserted that it had only used the term "residual" to refer to the state sovereignty that survived the ratification of the Constitution. The only applicable test was whether the county was acting as an arm of the state, and Chatham County had already conceded in the lower court proceedings that it did not qualify. Furthermore, the Court noted that the question on which it granted certiorari was premised on the conclusion that the county was not an arm of the state.

The Court also rejected the county's alternative argument for a sovereign immunity applicable specifically to in personam admiralty suits, which would bar "cases arising from a county's exercise of core state functions with regard to navigable waters." The Court observed that any immunity extended to states in admiralty cases was simply an application of general principles of sovereign immunity, rather than any issues specific to suits in admiralty.
