= List of United States Supreme Court cases, volume 547 =

This is a list of all the United States Supreme Court cases from volume 547 of the United States Reports:

Case name	Citation	Date decided
Texaco Inc. v. Dagher	547 U.S. 1	2006
The pricing decisions of a legitimate joint venture between oil companies to sell gasoline to service stations did not violate the Sherman Antitrust Act.
Scheidler v. National Organization for Women	547 U.S. 9	2006
The Hobbs Act does not apply to the use of violence to block access to abortion clinics, because physical violence unrelated to robbery or extortion falls outside the act's scope.
Ill. Tool Works Inc. v. Independent Ink, Inc.	547 U.S. 28	2006
A product involved in a tying arrangement is not presumed to have market power for purposes of establishing an antitrust violation by the mere fact that it is patented.
Rumsfeld v. Forum for Academic & Inst. Rights, Inc.	547 U.S. 47	2006
Merrill Lynch, Pierce, Fenner & Smith, Inc. v. Dabit	547 U.S. 71	2006
The Securities Litigation Uniform Standards Act of 1998 preempts state law securities holder class actions even though such claims cannot be brought under federal securities laws.
United States v. Grubbs	547 U.S. 90	2006
An anticipatory warrant is not defective under the Fourth Amendment when it fails to list the "triggering condition" necessary for its execution, because a warrant only needs to describe with particularity the place or person to be searched and the items to be seized.
Georgia v. Randolph	547 U.S. 103	2006
In the circumstances here at issue, a physically present co-occupant's stated refusal to permit entry prevails, rendering the warrantless search unreasonable and invalid as to him.
Arizona v. California	547 U.S. 150	2006
Gonzales v. Thomas	547 U.S. 183	2006
Salinas v. United States	547 U.S. 188	2006
For purposes of the sentencing guidelines, the definition of "controlled substance offense" requires possession with intent to manufacture, import, export, distribute, or dispense.
N. Ins. Co. v. Chatham Cnty.	547 U.S. 189	2006
A county that was not acting as an "arm of the state" did not have sovereign immunity from lawsuits authorized by federal law.
Day v. McDonough	547 U.S. 198	2006
A state's unintentional failure to object to the filing of a habeas corpus petition after the statute of limitations expired does not prevent a district court from dismissing the petition on its own initiative.
Jones v. Flowers	547 U.S. 220	2006
When the notice of a tax sale is returned unclaimed, the Fourteenth Amendment's guarantee of due process requires a state to take additional reasonable steps to contact the property owner before it can sell his property.
Hartman v. Moore	547 U.S. 250	2006
A plaintiff in a retaliatory-prosecution action against federal officials must plead and show the absence of probable cause for pressing the underlying criminal charges.
Ark. Dept. of Human Services v. Ahlborn	547 U.S. 268	2006
Under federal Medicaid law, a state cannot assert a lien on a benefit recipient's litigation settlement beyond the amount attributable to payment for past medical expenses.
Marshall v. Marshall	547 U.S. 293	2006
Holmes v. South Carolina	547 U.S. 319	2006
DaimlerChrysler Corp. v. Cuno	547 U.S. 332	2006
State taxpayers do not have Article III standing to challenge state tax or spending in federal court simply by virtue of their status as taxpayers.
Sereboff v. Mid Atl. Med. Serv. Inc.	547 U.S. 356	2006
An ERISA plan fiduciary may seek reimbursement for medical costs from the proceeds of the beneficiary's personal injury settlement.
S. D. Warren Co. v. Maine Board of Environmental Protection	547 U.S. 370	2006
eBay Inc. v. MercExchange, L.L.C.	547 U.S. 388	2006
Brigham City v. Stuart	547 U.S. 398	2006
Garcetti v. Ceballos	547 U.S. 410	2006
Anza v. Ideal Steel Supply Corp.	547 U.S. 451	2006
Zedner v. United States	547 U.S. 489	2006
Whitman v. Dept. of Transp.	547 U.S. 512	2006
Mohawk Industries, Inc. v. Williams	547 U.S. 516	2006
Question 1 dismissed as improvidently granted. Otherwise, grant, vacate, remand for further consideration in light of Anza v. Ideal Steel Supply Corp..
House v. Bell	547 U.S. 518	2006
Hill v. McDonough	547 U.S. 573	2006
Hudson v. Michigan	547 U.S. 586	2006
Kircher v. Putnam Funds Tr.	547 U.S. 633	2006
A federal district court's decision to send a case back to state court because its removal to federal court was not required by the Security Litigation Uniform Standards Act cannot be reviewed under 28 U.S.C. 1447(d).
Howard Delivery Service, Inc. v. Zurich Am. Ins. Co.	547 U.S. 651	2006
A creditor cannot seek priority status in a bankruptcy case to recover unpaid premiums owed for legally-required workers' compensation insurance.
Empire HealthChoice Assurance, Inc. v. McVeigh	547 U.S. 677	2006
Rapanos v. United States	547 U.S. 715	2006
Davis v. Washington	547 U.S. 813	2006
Samson v. California	547 U.S. 843	2006
Youngblood v. West Virginia	547 U.S. 867	2006
