= Texaco Inc. v. Dagher =

- Supreme Court of the United States

Argued January 10, 2006 Decided February 28, 2006
- Full case name: Texaco Incorporated, Petitioner v. Fouad N. Dagher, et al.; Shell Oil Company, Petitioner v. Fouad N. Dagher, et al.
- Citations: 547 U.S. 1 (more) 126 S. Ct. 1276; 164 L. Ed. 2d 1; 2006 U.S. LEXIS 2023; 74 U.S.L.W. 4147; 2006-1 Trade Cas. (CCH) ¶ 75,143

Case history
- Prior: Summary judgment granted to defendants, Dagher v. Saudi Refining, Inc., C.D. Cal.; affirmed in part, reversed and remanded, 369 F.3d 1108 (9th Cir. 2004); cert. granted, sub nom. Texaco Inc. v. Dagher, 125 S. Ct. 2957 (2005)

Holding
- The pricing decisions of a legitimate joint venture between oil companies to sell gasoline to service stations did not violate the Sherman Antitrust Act.

Court membership
- Chief Justice John Roberts Associate Justices John P. Stevens · Antonin Scalia; Anthony Kennedy · David Souter; Clarence Thomas · Ruth Bader Ginsburg; Stephen Breyer · Samuel Alito

Case opinion
- Majority: Thomas, joined by Roberts, Stevens, Scalia, Kennedy, Souter, Ginsburg, Breyer
- Alito took no part in the consideration or decision of the case.

Laws applied
- 15 U.S.C. § 1 (§ 1 of the Sherman Antitrust Act)

Texaco Inc. v. Dagher, 547 U.S. 1 (2006), was a decision by the Supreme Court of the United States involving the application of U.S. antitrust law to a joint venture between oil companies to market gasoline to gas stations. The Court ruled unanimously that the joint venture's unified price for the two companies' brands of gasoline was not a price-fixing scheme between competitors in violation of the Sherman Antitrust Act. The Court instead considered the joint venture a single entity that made pricing decisions, in which the oil companies participated as cooperative investors.

== Facts ==
Texaco and Shell Oil, historically competitors in the national and international oil and gasoline markets, formed a joint venture in 1998 called "Equilon" to consolidate their operations in the western United States, which ended competition between the two companies in the domestic refining and marketing of gasoline. Under the joint venture agreement, Texaco and Shell agreed to pool their resources and share the risks of and profits from Equilon's activities. Equilon's board of directors would comprise representatives of Texaco and Shell Oil, and Equilon gasoline would be sold to gas stations under the original Texaco and Shell Oil brand names. The formation of Equilon was approved by consent decree, subject to certain divestments and other modifications, by the Federal Trade Commission, as well as by the state attorneys general of California, Hawaii, Oregon, and Washington. The consent decrees did not impose any restrictions on the prices Equilon charged.

== Judgment ==
=== District Court proceedings ===
After Equilon began to operate, a class of 23,000 Texaco and Shell gas station owners filed a class action lawsuit in the United States District Court for the Central District of California, alleging that, by unifying gasoline prices under the two brands, petitioners had violated the per se rule against price fixing that the Supreme Court had long recognized under § 1 of the Sherman Act. The District Court awarded summary judgment to Texaco and Shell Oil. It determined that the rule of reason governed the plaintiffs' claim, under which only "unreasonable restraints of trade" were prohibited by the Sherman Act. Because they had eschewed rule of reason analysis, the plaintiffs had failed to raise a triable issue of fact.

=== Ninth Circuit decision ===
The Ninth Circuit reversed, ruling that the per se rule against price fixing instead applied, which conclusively presumed that the arrangement was illegal. The Ninth Circuit reached that decision by applying the ancillary restraints doctrine, which provided an exception from the rule of reason whenever a restraint on trade was not ancillary to the main purpose of an agreement. The court did not believe the oil companies had explained why the unified pricing for their two brands of gasoline was necessary to further the legitimate goals of the joint venture, and so reversed summary judgment. Texaco and Shell both petitioned for certiorari to the Supreme Court, which consolidated the petitions and granted certiorari to determine the extent to which the per se rule against price fixing applies to joint ventures.

=== Supreme Court ===
Justice Clarence Thomas delivered the opinion of the U.S. Supreme Court, in which the other seven participating justices joined in reversing the Ninth Circuit. Significant to the outcome of the case was the Court's presumption that the joint venture itself was legal, which it based on the prior approval by the FTC and the several states involved.

The Court ruled that the Equilon joint venture pricing decisions were not illegal price-fixing between competitors. Texaco and Shell did not compete with one another in the relevant market, but instead participated in that market jointly through their investments in Equilon. The two companies shared in Equilon's profits, and should be regarded as a single entity competing with other sellers in the market, regardless of the decision to market their gasoline under two brands instead of one.

Contrary to the Ninth Circuit's ruling, the Court did not believe that the ancillary restraints doctrine applied because the challenged business practice involved the "core activity" of the joint venture—the pricing of the goods it produced and sold. Even if the doctrine applied, pricing was certainly integral to a business that produced and sold goods.

== See also ==
- US antitrust law
- List of United States Supreme Court cases, volume 547
