= United States v. Gonzalez-Lopez =

- Supreme Court of the United States

Argued April 18, 2006 Decided June 26, 2006
- Full case name: United States v. Cuauhtémoc Gonzalez-Lopez
- Docket no.: 05-352
- Citations: 548 U.S. 140 (more) 126 S. Ct. 2557; 165 L. Ed. 2d 409; 2006 U.S. LEXIS 5165; 19 Fla. L. Weekly Fed. S 368

Case history
- Prior: Application to admit attorney pro hac vice denied, (E.D.Mo. 2003); defendant convicted, (E.D.Mo. 2003); reversed, 399 F.3d 924 (8th Cir. 2005); petition for en banc hearing denied, 2005 U.S. App. LEXIS 9208 (8th Cir. 2005); cert. granted, 126 S. Ct. 979 (2006)

Holding
- A trial court's erroneous deprivation of a criminal defendant's choice of counsel entitles him to a reversal of his conviction.

Court membership
- Chief Justice John Roberts Associate Justices John P. Stevens · Antonin Scalia; Anthony Kennedy · David Souter; Clarence Thomas · Ruth Bader Ginsburg; Stephen Breyer · Samuel Alito

Case opinions
- Majority: Scalia, joined by Stevens, Souter, Ginsburg, Breyer
- Dissent: Alito, joined by Roberts, Kennedy, Thomas

Laws applied
- U.S. Const. amend. VI

United States v. Gonzalez-Lopez, 548 U.S. 140 (2006), is a United States Supreme Court ruling that the erroneous deprivation of a defendant's attorney of choice entitles him to a reversal of his conviction under the Sixth Amendment to the United States Constitution.

== Background ==
The defendant in the underlying case, Cuauhtemoc Gonzalez-Lopez, was charged with conspiracy to distribute marijuana, in the United States District Court for the Eastern District of Missouri. His family initially hired local attorney John Fahle to represent him, but Gonzalez-Lopez then contacted and hired a California attorney, Joseph Low, to represent him, and the understanding appeared to be that Fahle and Low would work together on his case. The district court initially permitted Low and Fahle to work together, admitting Low pro hac vice (i.e., just this once), but soon revoked such permission, ruling that Low, when he passed notes to Fahle in a pretrial hearing, violated a local court rule restricting the cross-examination of a witness to one attorney.

Gonzalez-Lopez then informed Fahle that he wanted Low to be his only attorney, and Low then filed another request to be admitted pro hac vice, which the district court and the United States Court of Appeals for the Eighth Circuit both rejected. Meanwhile, Fahle filed a complaint against Low, claiming that Low had violated the Missouri Rules of Professional Conduct by contacting Gonzalez-Lopez while Fahle represented him. Fahle also sought to withdraw from the case. The district court let Fahle withdraw, ruled that Low violated the rules of professional conduct, and did not let Low represent Gonzalez-Lopez. Gonzalez-Lopez went to trial represented by another attorney, Karl Dickhaus, who requested permission for Low to sit with him at the counsel table. The trial judge denied that request and ordered Low to sit in the audience and not to speak with Dickhaus, enforcing the order by having a federal marshal sit between Dickhaus and Low throughout the trial. Gonzalez-Lopez was found guilty.

On appeal, the Eighth Circuit Court of Appeals reversed Gonzalez-Lopez's conviction, ruling that the district court erred both in ruling that Low violated the rules of professional conduct and in refusing to allow Low to represent Gonzalez-Lopez. It further ruled that the error in denying Gonzalez-Lopez his right to choice of counsel (Low) was "structural" in nature—i.e., reversible without harmless error analysis. The prosecution then petitioned for certiorari from the United States Supreme Court. It did not dispute that the district court erred and improperly denied Gonzalez-Lopez his choice of counsel, but argued that such error should be subject to harmless error analysis, and that Gonzalez-Lopez was not prejudiced by the error.

== Opinion of the Court ==
=== Majority ===
Justice Antonin Scalia, writing for an unusual majority (5–4), held that the denial of Gonzalez-Lopez's right of choice of counsel was a structural error, requiring reversal without harmless error analysis. The Scalia opinion reasoned that the refusal to let Low represent Gonzalez-Lopez caused effects that could never be adequately measured for harmless error, because it is impossible to speculate on what the effect that a different attorney and one that the defendant wished to have would have had on the proceedings—including whether a trial would have occurred in the first place. The entire proceeding was therefore unfair and unreliable, and must be reversed. Justice Scalia was joined by Justice John Paul Stevens, Justice David Souter, Justice Ruth Bader Ginsburg, and Justice Stephen Breyer. This case was one of only three in his tenure where Scalia alone sided with the liberal wing of the Court.

=== Dissent ===
Justice Samuel Alito, joined by Chief Justice John Roberts, Justice Anthony Kennedy, and Justice Clarence Thomas, dissented. Alito wrote that the Court had misinterpreted the Sixth Amendment's protection of the right to counsel to protect a defendant's choice of counsel, when he believed the text and history of the Amendment indicated that it merely protected a defendant's right to assistance that was as effective as his choice of counsel would be. Even if it protected choice of counsel, it did not mean that violation of this right should be grounds for automatic reversal. Instead, because the Constitution lacked directives as to how such rights should be enforced, the Court should follow the Congressional directive to apply harmless error analysis.
