= Kircher v. Putnam Funds Trust =

- Supreme Court of the United States

Decided June 15, 2006
- Full case name: Kircher v. Putnam Funds Trust
- Citations: 547 U.S. 633 (more)

Holding
- A federal district court's decision to send a case back to state court because its removal to federal court was not required by the Security Litigation Uniform Standards Act cannot be reviewed under 28 U.S.C. 1447(d).

Court membership
- Chief Justice John Roberts Associate Justices John P. Stevens · Antonin Scalia; Anthony Kennedy · David Souter; Clarence Thomas · Ruth Bader Ginsburg; Stephen Breyer · Samuel Alito

Case opinions
- Majority: Souter, joined by Roberts, Stevens, Kennedy, Thomas, Ginsburg, Breyer, Alito; Scalia (Parts I, III, IV only)
- Concurrence: Scalia (in part)

Laws applied
- Security Litigation Uniform Standards Act

Kircher v. Putnam Funds Trust, 547 U.S. 633 (2006), was a United States Supreme Court case in which the court held that a federal district court's decision to send a case back to state court because its removal to federal court was not required by the Security Litigation Uniform Standards Act cannot be reviewed under 28 U.S.C. 1447(d).
