= Samson v. California =

- Supreme Court of the United States

Argued February 22, 2006 Decided June 19, 2006
- Full case name: Donald Curtis Samson v. the State of California
- Docket no.: 04-9728
- Citations: 547 U.S. 843 (more) 126 S. Ct. 2193; 165 L. Ed. 2d 250; 2006 U.S. LEXIS 4885

Case history
- Prior: Cert. granted, 545 U.S. 1165 (2005).

Holding
- The Fourth Amendment does not prohibit a police officer from conducting a suspicionless search of a parolee.

Court membership
- Chief Justice John Roberts Associate Justices John P. Stevens · Antonin Scalia; Anthony Kennedy · David Souter; Clarence Thomas · Ruth Bader Ginsburg; Stephen Breyer · Samuel Alito

Case opinions
- Majority: Thomas, joined by Roberts, Scalia, Kennedy, Ginsburg, Alito
- Dissent: Stevens, joined by Souter, Breyer

Laws applied
- U.S. Const. amend. IV.

Samson v. California, 547 U.S. 843 (2006), is a United States Supreme Court case in which the Court affirmed the California Court of Appeal's ruling that suspicionless searches of parolees are lawful under California law and that the search in this case was reasonable under the Fourth Amendment to the United States Constitution because it was not arbitrary, capricious, or harassing.

This case answered in the affirmative a variation of the question the Court left open in United States v. Knights, 534 U.S. 112, 120 n.6 (2001), "whether a condition of release can so diminish or eliminate a released prisoner's reasonable expectation of privacy that a suspicionless search by a law enforcement officer would not offend the Fourth Amendment."

== Background ==
=== Police search ===
On the afternoon of September 6, 2002, San Bruno, California police officer Alex Rohleder observed "two adults and a little baby walking down the street." One of the adults, whom Rohleder recognized "from a prior contact", was the defendant in the case, Donald Curtis Samson. Rohleder knew that Samson had been paroled and had heard from other officers that Samson "might have a parolee at large warrant". Rohleder parked his police vehicle, approached Samson, and "made contact" with him.

When Rohleder asked Samson whether he had a warrant, Samson replied that he did not and "was in good standing with his parole agent". Rohleder confirmed over his police radio that Samson was not subject to a parole warrant, but was on parole for a prior parole violation. Rohleder conducted a search of Samson because of his status as a parolee. One of Samson's conditions of parole was agreement to "search and seizure by a parole officer or other peace officer at any time of the night or day, with or without a search warrant or with or without cause". This condition is required by California Penal Code Section 3067(a).

Rohleder found a cigarette box in Samson's left breast pocket that held a plastic bag containing methamphetamine. Samson was arrested and later charged with violating California Health and Safety Code Ann. §11377(a).

=== State court trial and appeal ===
At trial, Samson moved to suppress the methamphetamine evidence, which was denied by the trial court. The court found that §3067(a) authorized the search and that it was not "arbitrary or capricious." The jury convicted Samson, and the trial court sentenced him to seven years in prison.

Samson appealed his conviction on the grounds that the trial court improperly admitted the evidence from the search. The California Court of Appeal affirmed the trial court's ruling, relying on People v. Reyes, 19 Cal. 4th 743, 968 P. 2d 445 (1998), in which the court held that suspicionless searches of parolees are lawful under California law, that "a search is reasonable within the meaning of the Fourth Amendment as long as it is not arbitrary, capricious or harassing", and that the search was not arbitrary, capricious or harassing.
