= Fernandez-Vargas v. Gonzales =

- Supreme Court of the United States

Argued March 22, 2006 Decided June 22, 2006
- Full case name: Fernandez-Vargas v. Gonzales, Attorney General
- Citations: 548 U.S. 30 (more) 126 S. Ct. 2422; 165 L. Ed. 2d 323; 2006 U.S. LEXIS 4892

Case history
- Prior: 394 F.3d 881 (10th Cir. 2005); cert. granted, 546 U.S. 975 (2005).

Holding
- Section 241(a)(5) of the Illegal Immigration Reform and Immigrant Responsibility Act of 1996 applies to those who reentered the United States before the effective date of the Act and it does not retroactively affect any right of, or impose any burden on, the continuing violator of the INA now before this Court.

Court membership
- Chief Justice John Roberts Associate Justices John P. Stevens · Antonin Scalia; Anthony Kennedy · David Souter; Clarence Thomas · Ruth Bader Ginsburg; Stephen Breyer · Samuel Alito

Case opinions
- Majority: Souter, joined by Roberts, Scalia, Kennedy, Thomas, Ginsburg, Breyer, Alito
- Dissent: Stevens

Laws applied
- Illegal Immigration Reform and Immigrant Responsibility Act of 1996

Fernandez-Vargas v. Gonzales, 548 U.S. 30 (2006), is a United States Supreme Court case that considered Humberto Fernandez-Vargas, a Mexican citizen who, after being deported, illegally reentered the United States in 1982, and remained undetected for over 20 years, fathering a son in 1989 and marrying the boy's mother, a U.S. citizen, in 2001. He filed an application to adjust his status to that of a lawful permanent resident, but the Government began proceedings to reinstate his 1981 deportation order under §241(a)(5) of the Immigration and Nationality Act, and deported him.

Fernandez-Vargas argued that because he illegally reentered the country before the IIRIRA's effective date, §241(a)(5) did not bar his application for an adjustment of status, and that §241(a)(5) would be impermissibly retroactive if it did bar his adjustment application. The Court held that Section 241(a)(5) applies to those who reentered the U.S. before IIRIRA's effective date and does not retroactively affect any right of, or impose any burden on, the continuing violator of the INA now before this Court.
