= Empire HealthChoice Assurance, Inc. v. McVeigh =

- Supreme Court of the United States

Argued April 25, 2006 Decided June 15, 2006
- Full case name: Empire HealthChoice Assurance, Inc. dba Empire Blue Cross Blue Shield v. McVeigh as administratrix of the Estate of McVeigh
- Docket no.: 05-200
- Citations: 547 U.S. 677 (more) 126 S. Ct. 2121; 165 L. Ed. 2d 131

Case history
- Prior: 396 F.3d 136 (2d Cir. 2005), affirmed.

Court membership
- Chief Justice John Roberts Associate Justices John P. Stevens · Antonin Scalia; Anthony Kennedy · David Souter; Clarence Thomas · Ruth Bader Ginsburg; Stephen Breyer · Samuel Alito

Case opinions
- Majority: Ginsburg, joined by Roberts, Stevens, Scalia, Thomas
- Dissent: Breyer, joined by Kennedy, Souter, Alito

Empire HealthChoice Assurance, Inc. v. McVeigh, 547 U.S. 677 (2006), is a United States Supreme Court case.

Empire Healthchoice Assurance, Inc. was a health insurance company that sued the estate of a deceased federal employee who received $157,000 in insurance benefits as the result of an injury. The wife of this federal employee had won $3.2 million in a separate lawsuit from those who she claimed had caused her husband's injuries. Empire Healthchoice Assurance sued her for reimbursement of the benefits paid to him on the grounds that a provision in the federal insurance plan required paid benefits to be reimbursed when the beneficiary is compensated for an injury by a third party. The United States Court of Appeals for the Second Circuit ruled against the health insurance company. The Supreme Court, in an opinion by Ruth Bader Ginsburg, affirmed the Court of Appeals' ruling in a 5-4 opinion. Justices Breyer, Kennedy, Souter, and Alito dissented.
