= Woodford v. Ngo =

- Supreme Court of the United States

Argued March 22, 2006 Decided June 22, 2006
- Full case name: Jeanne S. Woodford, et al., Petitioners v. Viet Mike Ngo
- Docket no.: 05-416
- Citations: 548 U.S. 81 (more) 126 S. Ct. 2378; 165 L. Ed. 2d 368; 2006 U.S. LEXIS 4891; 19 Fla. L. Weekly Fed. S 332

Case history
- Prior: Ngo v. Woodford, 403 F.3d 620 (9th Cir. 2005); cert. granted, 546 U.S. 1015 (2005).
- Subsequent: On remand, 539 F.3d 1108 (9th Cir. 2008).

Holding
- The Prison Litigation Reform Act of 1995 (PLRA) requirement that a prisoner exhaust any available administrative remedies before challenging prison conditions in federal court bars him from doing so not only when this first lawsuit has been lost, but also when he failed to timely brought it.

Court membership
- Chief Justice John Roberts Associate Justices John P. Stevens · Antonin Scalia; Anthony Kennedy · David Souter; Clarence Thomas · Ruth Bader Ginsburg; Stephen Breyer · Samuel Alito

Case opinions
- Majority: Alito, joined by Roberts, Scalia, Kennedy, Thomas
- Concurrence: Breyer
- Dissent: Stevens, joined by Souter, Ginsburg

Laws applied
- Prison Litigation Reform Act of 1995

Woodford v. Ngo, 548 U.S. 81 (2006), is a United States Supreme Court case about the procedures determining when prison litigation may be commenced in federal court. Justice Samuel Alito, writing for the majority, ruled that prisoners must exhaust all state-court remedies in accordance with the rules thereof before filing claims in federal court. Justice Stephen Breyer filed a concurrence. Justice John Paul Stevens filed a dissent.

== Background ==
The Prison Litigation Reform Act of 1995 (PLRA) requires a prisoner to exhaust any available administrative remedies before challenging prison conditions in federal court. Ngo, an inmate at San Quentin State Prison (serving a life sentence for murder) filed a grievance with California prison officials about conditions in the prison, but it was rejected as untimely under state law. He then sued the prison officials under §1983 in the Federal District Court.

The District Court granted the prison officials' motion to dismiss on the ground that respondent had not fully exhausted his administrative remedies under the PLRA. The Ninth Circuit Court of Appeals reversed, holding that respondent had exhausted those remedies because none remained available to him. The Supreme Court granted certiorari.

=== Issue ===
The question presented was "whether a prisoner can satisfy the Prison Litigation Reform Act's exhaustion requirement ... by filing an untimely or otherwise procedurally defective administrative grievance or appeal."

=== Parties' arguments ===
The prison officials argued that a prisoner must complete the administrative review process in accordance with the applicable procedural rules, including deadlines, before bringing suit in federal court. Ngo's attorneys, on the other hand, argued that this provision simply means that a prisoner may not bring suit in federal court until administrative remedies are no longer available, even if the reason they are no longer available is due to the prisoner's own non-compliance with the applicable rules.

== Opinion of the Court ==
Justice Alito, for the majority, ruled in favor of the prison officials, writing that "proper exhaustion demands compliance with an agency's deadlines and other critical procedural rules because no adjudicative system can function effectively without imposing some orderly structure on the course of its proceedings." The point of the PLRA, he continues, is to avoid "unwarranted federal-court interference with the administration of prisons," and to allow Ngo's interpretation would frustrate the goal of the legislation.

=== Concurrence ===
Justice Breyer concurred in the judgment. While he agreed with the Court's interpretation of "exhaustion" in this case, he wrote also that administrative law "contains well established exceptions to exhaustion."

=== Dissent ===
Justice Stevens wrote a dissenting opinion. In that dissent, joined by Justices Souter and Ginsburg, Stevens writes that "The plain text of the PLRA simply requires that such administrative remedies as are available be exhausted before the prisoner can take the serious step of filing a federal lawsuit against the officials who hold him in custody." He interprets this to mean any exhaustion, not just "proper exhaustion," and says that the Court has read its own interpretation into the statute.
