= Washington v. Recuenco =

- Supreme Court of the United States

Argued April 17, 2006 Decided June 26, 2006
- Full case name: Washington v. Arturo R. Recuenco
- Citations: 548 U.S. 212 (more) 126 S. Ct. 2546; 165 L. Ed. 2d 466; 2006 U.S. LEXIS 5164

Holding
- Failure to submit a sentencing factor to the jury is not "structural" error, and therefore does not entitle to reversal of conviction if the error was harmless.

Court membership
- Chief Justice John Roberts Associate Justices John P. Stevens · Antonin Scalia; Anthony Kennedy · David Souter; Clarence Thomas · Ruth Bader Ginsburg; Stephen Breyer · Samuel Alito

Case opinions
- Majority: Thomas, joined by Roberts, Scalia, Kennedy, Souter, Breyer, and Alito
- Concurrence: Kennedy
- Dissent: Stevens
- Dissent: Ginsburg, joined by Stevens

Washington v. Recuenco, 548 U.S. 212 (2006), is the United States Supreme Court case of Recuenco, a man who was convicted of second-degree assault after he threatened his wife with a handgun, and subsequently sentenced by the Washington Supreme Court based not only on the conviction, but based on Recuenco's use of a handgun, charged as assault with a deadly weapon. His sentencing included a three-year enhancement, a standard based on his being armed with a firearm, which is greater than the one-year enhancement he would have received for assault with a deadly weapon. As the jury in the case had not found that Recuenco was armed with a firearm, he argued that the sentencing enhancement violated his Sixth Amendment right to a jury trial.

At the Supreme Court, the State conceded that a Blakely error had occurred, but argued that the error was harmless beyond a reasonable doubt. The Court held in a 7-2 opinion that a Blakely error could be considered harmless.
