= Anza v. Ideal Steel Supply Corp. =

Anza v. Ideal Steel Supply Corporation
- Supreme Court of the United States

Argued March 27, 2006 Decided June 5, 2006
- Full case name: Joseph Anza, et al., Petitioners v. Ideal Steel Supply Corporation
- Docket no.: 04-433
- Citations: 547 U.S. 451 (more) 126 S. Ct. 1991; 164 L. Ed. 2d 720; 2006 U.S. LEXIS 4510; 74 U.S.L.W. 4278; 19 Fla. L. Weekly Fed. S 218

Case history
- Prior: United States District Court for the Southern District of New York, The Court of Appeals for the Second Circuit

Holding
- The plaintiff lacks standing because it was not directly injured by the defendant.

Court membership
- Chief Justice John Roberts Associate Justices John P. Stevens · Antonin Scalia; Anthony Kennedy · David Souter; Clarence Thomas · Ruth Bader Ginsburg; Stephen Breyer · Samuel Alito

Case opinions
- Majority: Kennedy, joined by Roberts, Stevens, Scalia, Souter, Ginsburg, Alito; Thomas (Part III)
- Concurrence: Scalia
- Concur/dissent: Thomas
- Concur/dissent: Breyer

Laws applied
- 18 U.S.C. 1964(c), Racketeer Influenced and Corrupt Organizations Act

Anza v. Ideal Steel Supply Corporation, 547 U.S. 451 (2006), was a United States Supreme Court case in which the Court, relying on Holmes v. Securities Investor Protection Corporation, held that to establish standing under the civil Racketeer Influenced and Corrupt Organizations Act (RICO) provision that creates a civil cause of action for any person or entity injured in their business or property by reason of a RICO violation, a plaintiff must demonstrate that he or she was the direct victim of the defendant's RICO violation (e.g., a business may not sue a competitor that may have gained a competitive advantage by not paying taxes). The Court explained that this construction will save district courts from the difficulty of determining an indirect victim's damages caused by attenuated conduct.

== Background ==
=== RICO ===
RICO makes it illegal for any person to use a pattern of racketeering activity to engage in certain business activities. It designates a variety of federal crimes ranging from murder to fraud as racketeering activities. RICO violations may lead to civil actions when any person or entity is injured in his business or property by reason of the violation. This civil cause of action provides a private party the means to recover treble damages plus attorney's fees.

=== Facts ===
Respondent Ideal Steel (Ideal) brought a civil action under 18 U.S.C. 1964(c) against Petitioners National Steel Supply, Inc. (National) and its owners, the Anzas. Both parties sell steel mill products along with related supplies and services in the New York boroughs of Queens and the Bronx. Ideal alleged that National failed to charge its cash customers New York sales tax, thereby enabling National to reduce its prices to Ideal's competitive disadvantage. National allegedly submitted fraudulent sales tax reports to the State Tax Department via wire and mail to conceal the tax evasion, which Ideal asserted constituted mail fraud and wire fraud, forms of "racketeering activity" under RICO.

Ideal claimed that National engaged in a "pattern of racketeering activity" because the fraudulent returns were submitted on an ongoing and regular basis. Ideal also filed a claim against the Anzas and National, alleging that they violated section 1962(a) by using funds generated by their fraudulent tax scheme to open their Bronx location, causing Ideal to lose business and market share.

=== Procedural history ===
National moved to dismiss the case, arguing that Ideal did not have standing because it had not adequately alleged that its injuries were proximately caused by National's alleged RICO violations. The U.S. District Court for the Southern District of New York granted National's motion, holding that Ideal had not pleaded "transaction causation," which, in complaints predicated on mail or wire fraud, requires a plaintiff to demonstrate that he or she relied on the defendant's misrepresentations.

The Court of Appeals for the Second Circuit vacated the District Court's ruling, finding that where a pattern of racketeering activity was intended to and did give the defendant a competitive advantage over the plaintiff, the complaint adequately pleads the necessary injury. This is so even where a third party (in this case the State of New York), rather than the plaintiff, was the one who received and relied upon the fraudulent communications. Thereby, Ideal had standing.

== Opinion of the Court ==
The Supreme Court disagreed. In the words of Justice Kennedy, "[the Court's] analysis begins -- and...largely ends -- with Holmes." In the Securities Investor Protection Corporation (SIPC) claimed that Petitioner Robert Holmes conspired with others to manipulate stock prices. Share prices dropped when the fraud was detected, causing two broker-dealers great financial difficulty, which led to their liquidation. SIPC thus had to advance nearly $13 million to cover the broker-dealers' customer claims. SIPC sued Holmes claiming that he participated in the conduct of an enterprise's affairs through a pattern of racketeering activity in violation of section 1962(c) and conspired to do so in violation of section 1962(d). The Court looked to legislative history to interpret section 1964(c)'s provision of a civil cause of action for people injured "by reason of" a defendant's RICO violation.

The Court recognized that Congress modeled section 1964(c) on section 4 of the Clayton Act, which provides for a civil action under the federal antitrust laws. The Supreme Court noted that in Associated General Contractors of California, Inc. v. Carpenters, it held that to have a cause of action under section 4, a plaintiff must show that the defendant's violation was not only a "but for" cause of the injury, but also a proximate cause. The Court looked to the common-law foundations of proximate cause, which demands "some direct relation between the injury asserted and the injurious conduct alleged." Based upon these interpretations, the Court held that SIPC's RICO claims did not satisfy the directness requirement. The link between the stock manipulation and the customers' harm was too remote where the broker-dealers' insolvency was the only connection between the conspirators' acts and the customers' losses.

Based upon the Holmes standard, the Court held that in this case, Ideal could not maintain its section 1962(c) claim. The direct victim of National's mail and wire fraud was the State of New York, not Ideal. While the Court recognized Ideal may have been harmed by National's lower prices, this harm was caused by actions entirely distinct from the alleged actions constituting the RICO violation (the fraudulent tax reports). The Court also noted that although the attenuation between Ideal's harms and the claimed RICO violation arose from a different source than in Holmes (where the alleged violations were linked to the plaintiff's alleged harm only through a third party), the absence of proximate causation was equally clear in both cases. The Court explained that the proximate cause requirement could not be avoided by claiming the defendant intended to and did harm the plaintiff. "When a court evaluates a RICO claim for proximate causation, the central question it must ask is whether the alleged violation led directly to the plaintiff's injuries." The Supreme Court held that, here, the answer was no.

The Court buttressed its determination based upon the underlying premises of the directness requirement. First, the Court explained that great difficulties arise when courts attempt to determine damages caused by attenuated actions. For example, in this case, National could have lowered its prices for numerous reasons unrelated to the asserted fraud. Conversely, Ideal's lost sales could have resulted from factors other than National's alleged RICO violation. Secondly, the direct causal connection requirement is especially warranted where the direct victims of the RICO violation can pursue their own claim. Here, the State of New York could file suit and in that situation, it would be much easier for a court to calculate New York's damages. Based on the foregoing reasons, the Court reversed the Second Circuit's holding that Ideal had satisfied the proximate cause requirement under its section 1962(c) claim.

In approaching Ideal's second claim—that National had violated section 1962(a) by using illegitimate funds to purchase its second store—the Court explained that both section 1962(c) and 1962(a) claims must be asserted under section 1964(c), invoking the requirement that the plaintiff's injury be proximately caused by the defendant's RICO violation. However, where sections 1962(c) and 1962(a) establish two distinct prohibitions, the Court said it is debatable whether Ideal's 1962(a) claim should be analyzed in the same way as its 1962(c) claim in regards to proximate cause. The Supreme Court declined, however, to consider the issue because the Second Circuit failed to address proximate causation in relation to Ideal's 1962(a) claim. Thus, the Court vacated and remanded the Second Circuit's judgment with the instructions that the Second Circuit confront this issue.

The Court ultimately did not address the question posed in the grant of certiorari: whether a company seeking damages under RICO for alleged mail or wire fraud must prove that it directly relied on the fraudulent conduct, and that this reliance resulted in injury. Where Ideal could not show proximate cause, the Court stated it had no occasion to address this issue.

=== Concurrence ===
Justice Scalia concurred with the majority, but wrote separately to note that Ideal's alleged 1962(c) injury was not within the zone of interests protected by the RICO cause of action and so Ideal did not have standing to bring suit.

=== Concurrence in part ===
Justice Thomas concurred only with the majority's holding in regards to Ideal's section 1962(a) cause of action. While he supported limiting the use of the civil provision of RICO, he felt that the majority's strict proximate causation requirement eliminated recovery for plaintiffs whose injuries are exactly those that Congress intended to remedy. Thomas argued that the Court's determination in this case was actually based on a theory of "directness" distinct from that adopted in Holmes. Thomas emphasized that it was National's conduct that enabled the company to undercut Ideal's prices and thereby put Ideal at a competitive disadvantage. Therefore, Thomas argued that because National's tax fraud directly caused Ideal's injury, Holmes did not bar recovery.

Thomas also asserted that the majority's reliance on the difficulty of ascertaining the amount of Ideal's damages in holding that the injuries were indirect was misguided, as it is within the district court's expertise to evaluate evidence and determine what portion of Ideal's lost sales were due to National's lower prices.

=== Concurrence with judgment ===
Justice Breyer concurred with the majority's outcome but not its reasoning. He distinguished this case from Holmes, stating that the causal links here were more direct. However, for Justice Breyer, RICO does not provide a private right of action based upon harm induced by normal business practices, such as offering lower prices. In Breyer's view, National cut prices by the amount of the sales tax and kept the money; this source of National's savings was irrelevant because the price cut itself was legitimate, and thus, Ideal could not prove a direct causal link.

== Subsequent developments ==
RICO was enacted to combat the effects of organized crime on the nation's business economy; however, because of section 1964(c), a majority of RICO cases are brought against legitimate individuals or businesses rather than criminal organizations. Both the courts and the legislature have attempted to limit the scope of RICO in civil causes of action. The Court's decision in Ideal apparently does so by imposing a higher burden on plaintiffs to establish a direct link between their injury and the defendant's alleged racketeering activity. Failure to do so, under this new precedent, could provide grounds for dismissal of a civil RICO case. This limitation could also make it easier for businesses to harm their competitors and avoid liability where a third party is the direct victim of their scheme.

Congress could choose to nullify the Court's decision via legislation; however, Congress has not yet introduced any bills relating to Ideal's holding.

=== Mohawk Industries v. Williams ===
On the same day as its decision in Ideal, the Supreme Court remanded Mohawk Industries v. Williams for reconsideration in light of its holding in Ideal.

On December 12, 2005, the Supreme Court granted certiorari in Mohawk Industries, Inc. v. Williams, another civil suit brought under section 1964(c) of RICO. In this case, employees alleged that their employer, Mohawk Industries (Mohawk), violated RICO by knowingly employing illegal immigrants with the help of third party employment agencies. The larger job pool enabled Mohawk to lower the wages of its legal employees and thereby reduce its labor costs. The Supreme Court, on the same day as its decision in Ideal, issued a brief order stating that certiorari had been granted improvidently and remanded the case to the U.S. Court of Appeals for the Eleventh Circuit for consideration in light of its decision in Anza v. Ideal Steel Supply Corp. Under the Ideal rationale, it would appear that the direct victim of Mohawk's RICO violations was the federal government, not Mohawk's employees. Therefore, Ideal may pose a problem to the plaintiffs' case in Mohawk.
