= Schaffer v. Weast =

2005 Supreme Court case

Brian Schaffer ex rel. Schaffer v. Superintendent Jerry Weast
- Supreme Court of the United States

Argued February 22, 2005 Decided October 5, 2005
- Full case name: Brian Schaffer ex rel. v. Superintendent Jerry Weast
- Citations: 546 U.S. 49 (more)

Holding
- The parents/guardians have the burden of proof regarding disputes over a child's education under IDEA.

Court membership
- Chief Justice John Roberts Associate Justices John P. Stevens · Sandra Day O'Connor; Antonin Scalia · Anthony Kennedy; David Souter · Clarence Thomas; Ruth Bader Ginsburg · Stephen Breyer

Case opinions
- Majority: O'Connor, joined by Kennedy, Scalia, Souter, Thomas
- Concurrence: Stevens
- Dissent: Ginsburg
- Dissent: Breyer
- Roberts took no part in the consideration or decision of the case.

Laws applied
- Individuals with Disabilities Education Act

Schaffer v. Weast, 546 U.S. 49 (2005), is a Supreme Court case that determined that the burden of proof belonged to whoever challenged an Individualized Education Program (IEP). Schaffer v. Weast revised the Individuals with Disabilities Education Act (IDEA) which had introduced IEPs as a method of ensuring an individual and effective education for disabled students. Prior to Schaffer v. Weast, when any party challenged an IEP, the burden of proof was almost always placed on the respective school system.

== Question Raised ==
Who is assigned the burden of proof if parents or a school system decide to legally challenge an IEP?

== Decision ==
On November 14, 2005, the Supreme Court issued a 6-2 ruling in favor of Weast. After the case, Justice O’Connor stated that “If parents believe their child's IEP is inappropriate, they may request an "impartial due process hearing." §1415(f). The Act is silent, however, as to which party bears the burden of persuasion at such a hearing. We hold that the burden lies, as it typically does, on the party seeking relief.”

== Background ==
Jocelyn and Martin Schaffer, parents of Brian Schaffer, sued superintendent Jerry Weast and the Montgomery County Public Schools, because the Schaffer's claimed that their child was not receiving the fair and adequate education that is afforded to all students with disabilities in the United States under the Individuals with Disabilities Education Act (I.D.E.A.). The Schaffer family claimed that the Individualized Education Program (I.E.P.) that was created specifically for Brian – who has learning disabilities and speech impairments – was not working in the best interest of their child.

The district court that heard the case presented by the Schaffer family, held that the Schaffer family was in the right and the school district needed to rectify the situation of providing the supports needed the ensure Brian received a fair and adequate education. When the Fourth Circuit court took the case on appeal, it ruled that the lower court (district court) had mistakenly put the burden of proof on the school system – to prove the student received an adequate and fair education – and that whoever claimed the education plan of the student was not working had to prove so.
