= 2005 term per curiam opinions of the Supreme Court of the United States =

The Supreme Court of the United States handed down sixteen per curiam opinions during its 2005 term, which lasted from October 3, 2005, until October 1, 2006.

Because per curiam decisions are issued from the Court as an institution, these opinions all lack the attribution of authorship or joining votes to specific justices. All justices on the Court at the time the decision was handed down are assumed to have participated and concurred unless otherwise noted.

The cases for this term are listed chronologically, noting the midterm change in the Court's membership caused by the retirement of Justice Sandra Day O'Connor and the confirmation of Justice Samuel Alito to her seat on January 31, 2006.

== Court membership ==
Chief Justice: John Roberts

Associate Justices: John Paul Stevens, Sandra Day O'Connor (retired January 31, 2006), Antonin Scalia, Anthony Kennedy, David Souter, Clarence Thomas, Ruth Bader Ginsburg, Stephen Breyer, Samuel Alito (confirmed January 31, 2006)

== Dye v. Hofbauer ==
- Full caption: Paul Allen Dye v. Gerald Hofauer, Warden
- Citations: 546 U.S. 1; 126 S. Ct. 5; 163 L. Ed. 2d 1; 2005 U.S. LEXIS 7649; 74 U.S.L.W. 3227; 18 Fla. L. Weekly Fed. S 561
- Prior history: Petition dismissed, No. 97-74817, 1999 U.S. Dist. LEXIS 9120 (E.D. Mich., May 28, 1999); reversed, 45 Fed. Appx. 428 (6th Cir. 2002); vacated on rehearing, 111 Fed. Appx. 363 (6th Cir. 2004)
- Full text of the opinion: official slip opinion

546 U.S. 1
Decided October 11, 2005.
Sixth Circuit reversed and remanded.

The Court of Appeals had ruled that the habeas corpus petitioner failed to exhaust state remedies by not arguing his federal claim of prosecutorial misconduct in state court, which it concluded only because the state court's opinion failed to discuss that argument. The Supreme Court reversed, ruling that the failure of a court decision to discuss an argument does not by itself establish that the argument was never raised. The habeas petitioner's state court appellate brief clearly indicated that the federal claim had been raised in that forum.

== Schriro v. Smith ==
- Full caption: Dora B. Schriro, Director, Arizona Department of Corrections v. Robert Douglas Smith
- Citations: 546 U.S. 6; 126 S. Ct. 7; 163 L. Ed. 2d 6; 2005 U.S. LEXIS 7652; 74 U.S.L.W. 3246; 18 Fla. L. Weekly Fed. S 563
- Prior history: Petition dismissed, sub nom., Smith v. Stewart, No. 87-234, D. Ariz.; affirmed in part, reversed, 241 F.3d 1191 (9th Cir. 2001); reversed, 536 U.S. 856 (2002); rehearing denied, 536 U.S. 982 (2002)
- Full text of the opinion: official slip opinion

546 U.S. 6
Decided October 17, 2005.
Ninth Circuit reversed and remanded.

The Court of Appeals had suspended habeas proceedings and ordered Arizona state courts to conduct a jury trial on the issue of whether the petitioner was intellectually disabled and therefore could not be executed under the Supreme Court's ruling in Atkins v. Virginia, 536 U.S. 304 (2002). The Supreme Court ruled that the court exceeded its authority by determining the method by which the petitioner's status was to be determined, because Atkins had expressly left it up to the states to decide their own procedures.

== Kane v. Garcia Espitia ==
- Full caption: Anthony Kane, Warden v. Joe Garcia Espitia
- Citations: 546 U.S. 9; 126 S. Ct. 407; 163 L. Ed. 2d 10; 2005 U.S. LEXIS 8200; 74 U.S.L.W. 3270
- Prior history: Petition dismissed, No. 00-00828, C.D. Cal.; reversed, 113 Fed. Appx. 802 (9th Cir. 2004)
- Full text of the opinion: official slip opinion

546 U.S. 9
Decided October 31, 2005.
Ninth Circuit reversed and remanded.

The Court of Appeals had ruled that the habeas petition of a pro se defendant (representing himself) who was denied access to a law library during his trial should not have been dismissed. The court believed that the Supreme Court's decision in Faretta v. California, 422 U.S. 806 (1975) established that such a denial of access violated a defendant's Sixth Amendment right to defend himself. The Supreme Court reversed, observing that Faretta said nothing specific about a state's duty to aid pro se defendants, and that lower court rulings conflicted on whether Faretta established such a right. It accordingly could not be used to claim an error of "clearly established" federal law as required by 28 U.S.C. § 2254(d)(1).

== Eberhart v. United States ==
- Full caption: Ivan Eberhart v. United States
- Citations: 546 U.S. 12; 126 S. Ct. 403; 163 L. Ed. 2d 14; 2005 U.S. LEXIS 8201; 74 U.S.L.W. 3271; 18 Fla. L. Weekly Fed. S 565
- Prior history: Defendant convicted, No. 98-946, N.D. Ill.; motion for new trial granted, No. 98-946, 2003 U.S. Dist. LEXIS 4392 (N.D. Ill. 2003); reversed, 388 F.3d 1043 (7th Cir. 2004); rehearing, rehearing en banc denied, No. 03-2068, 2004 U.S. App. LEXIS 27015 (7th Cir. Dec. 17, 2004)
- Subsequent history: On remand, reversed, 434 F.3d 935 (7th Cir. 2006); rehearing, rehearing en banc denied, No. 03-2068, 2006 U.S. App. LEXIS 4915 (7th Cir. Feb. 23, 2006)
- Full text of the opinion: official slip opinion

546 U.S. 12
Decided October 31, 2005.
Seventh Circuit reversed and remanded.

On appeal from a conviction for conspiracy to sell narcotics, the Court of Appeals had ruled that the time limit set forth in Fed. R. Civ. P. 33 for motions for a new trial was a requirement of subject-matter jurisdiction. It accordingly allowed the government to raise the issue on appeal for the first time. The Supreme Court reversed, ruling that Rule 33 merely established a non-jurisdictional, inflexible claim-processing rule that was forfeited if not timely asserted.

== Bradshaw v. Richey ==
- Full caption: Margaret Bradshaw, Warden, v. Kenneth T. Richey
- Citations: 546 U.S. 74; 126 S. Ct. 602; 163 L. Ed. 2d 407; 2005 U.S. LEXIS 9033; 74 U.S.L.W. 3320; 19 Fla. L. Weekly Fed. S 7
- Prior history: Petition denied, sub nom., Richey v. Mitchell, No. 98-01418, N.D. Ohio; reversed, 395 F.3d 660 (6th Cir. 2005); decision amended in part, rehearing denied, rehearing en banc denied, No. 2005 U.S. App. LEXIS 7355 (6th Cir. Apr. 15, 2005)
- Subsequent history: Rehearing denied, 126 S. Ct. 1163 (2006)
- Full text of the opinion: official slip opinion

546 U.S. 74
Decided November 28, 2005.
Sixth Circuit vacated and remanded.

The Court of Appeals had ruled that the habeas petitioner's conviction was contrary to Ohio law, which it claimed did not recognize transferred intent as a theory for aggravated felony murder; and that petitioner's trial counsel was ineffective under Strickland v. Washington, 466 U.S. 668 (1984). The Supreme Court vacated the court's decision, holding that it had directly contradicted the authoritative interpretation of the relevant state law by the Ohio Supreme Court. The Court further held that the ineffective assistance of counsel claim was inappropriately based on evidence that had not been properly presented first to the state habeas courts, and on arguments that had not been presented on state court appeal.

== Wisconsin Right to Life, Inc. v. Federal Election Commission ==
- Full caption: Wisconsin Right to Life, Inc. v. Federal Election Commission
- Citations: 546 U.S. 410; 126 S. Ct. 1016; 163 L. Ed. 2d 990; 2006 U.S. LEXIS 1070; 74 U.S.L.W. 4116
- Prior history: Injunction denied, No. 04-1260, 2004 U.S. Dist. LEXIS 29036 (D.D.C. Aug. 17, 2004); injunction denied, appeal dismissed, No. 04-1260, 2004 U.S. App. LEXIS 18795, (D.D.C. Sept. 1, 2004); injunction denied, 542 U.S. 1305 (2004) (Rehnquist, C.J.); dismissed, No. 04-1260, 2005 U.S. Dist. LEXIS 17226 (D.D.C. May 9, 2005); probable jurisdiction noted, 126 S. Ct. 36 (2005)
- Subsequent history: 126 S. Ct. 1163 (2006)
- Full text of the opinion: official slip opinion

546 U.S. 410
Argued January 17, 2006.
Decided January 23, 2006.
District Court for the District of Columbia vacated and remanded.

The District Court had dismissed an "as-applied" challenge to the prohibition of the Bipartisan Campaign Reform Act of 2002 against the funding of "electioneering communications" from the general treasury funds of corporations, finding such challenges foreclosed by the Supreme Court's decision in McConnell v. FEC, 540 U.S. 93 (2003). The Supreme Court vacated, ruling that "as-applied" challenges to this provision had not been foreclosed by McConnell, and that the District Court had instead incorrectly interpreted a footnote from that case.

This case was addressed in full by the Court in Federal Election Commission v. Wisconsin Right to Life, Inc., 551 U.S. 449 (2007).

== Ministry of Defense and Support for Armed Forces of Islamic Republic of Iran v. Elahi ==
- Full caption: Ministry of Defense and Support for Armed Forces of Islamic Republic of Iran v. Dariush Elahi
- Citations: 546 U.S. 450; 126 S. Ct. 1193; 163 L. Ed. 2d 1047; 2006 U.S. LEXIS 1817
- Prior history: Motion granted in part, sub nom., Ministry of Def. & Support v. Cubic Def. Sys., 236 F. Supp. 2d 1140 (S.D. Cal. 2002); affirmed, 385 F.3d 1206 (9th Cir. 2004);
- Full text of the opinion: official slip opinion

546 U.S. 450
Decided February 21, 2006.
Ninth Circuit reversed and remanded.

The Court of Appeals had ruled that the property of the Iranian Ministry of Defense could be attached by a private plaintiff under the Foreign Sovereign Immunities Act (FSIA). It disagreed with the District Court's conclusion that the Ministry had waived its FSIA immunity, but instead ruled that it was amenable to attachment as an "agency or instrumentality" of a state rather than immune as a foreign state. The Supreme Court reversed because whether the Ministry itself qualified as a foreign state under FSIA was not a distinction that had been argued or considered in the lower court.

This opinion was the first handed down by the Court in which Alito participated.

== Ash v. Tyson Foods, Inc. ==
- Full caption: Anthony Ash, et al. v. Tyson Foods, Inc.
- Citations: 546 U.S. 454; 126 S. Ct. 1195; 163 L. Ed. 2d 1053; 2006 U.S. LEXIS 1816; 97 Fair Empl. Prac. Cas. (BNA) 641; 87 Empl. Prac. Dec. (CCH) P42,263
- Prior history: Verdict for plaintiffs, No. 96-03257, N.D. Ala; affirmed in part, reversed, 129 Fed. Appx. 529 (11th Cir. 2005); rehearing en banc denied, 148 Fed. Appx. 923 (11th Cir. 2005)
- Full text of the opinion: official slip opinion

546 U.S. 454
Decided February 21, 2006.
Eleventh Circuit vacated and remanded.

The Court of Appeals had reversed a verdict for Title VII plaintiffs, ruling that use of the word "boy" without qualifications or modifiers could never by itself constitute a racial slur. The court also found insufficient plaintiffs' evidence that the defendant's explanation of its conduct was merely a pretext for racial discrimination, because it failed to "jump off the page and slap you in the face."

The Supreme Court vacated, ruling that there was no basis for the lower court to conclude that the unqualified word "boy" was always benign. The Court also found the Court of Appeals' standard for evaluating the significance of pretextual evidence to be imprecise and unclear.

== Lance v. Dennis ==
- Full caption: Keith Lance, et al. v. Gigi Dennis, Colorado Secretary of State
- Citations: 546 U.S. 459; 126 S. Ct. 1198; 163 L. Ed. 2d 1059; 2006 U.S. LEXIS 1105
- Prior history: Dismissed, 379 F. Supp. 2d 1117 (D. Colo. 2005)
- Subsequent history: On remand, dismissed in part, 444 F. Supp. 2d 1149 (D. Colo. 2006); vacated in part, remanded, sub nom. Lance v. Coffman, 549 U.S. 437 (2007)
- Full text of the opinion: official slip opinion

546 U.S. 459
Decided February 21, 2006.
District Court for the District of Colorado vacated and remanded.

The District Court had dismissed a suit supporting a legislative redistricting plan that the Colorado Supreme Court had invalidated in a prior action that was lost by the Colorado General Assembly, in part by challenging the state court's decision under the U.S. Constitution. The District Court ruled that it lacked jurisdiction over the suit under the federal Rooker-Feldman doctrine. Although the plaintiffs were not parties to the prior state court action as the doctrine required, the District Court found that it nevertheless applied because the outcome of a government's litigation on a matter of public concern has preclusive effect over its citizens, such that the plaintiffs were in privity with the Colorado General Assembly. The Supreme Court vacated, ruling that the District Court had erroneously conflated preclusion principles with the Rooker-Feldman doctrine. This would cause the doctrine to conflict with the Full Faith and Credit Clause, because federal courts would then ignore the preclusive effects that state law would actually extend to state court decisions in favor of an exclusively federal law of preclusion.

Ginsburg filed a concurrence, joined by Souter, noting that the issue in Stevens' dissent was better determined by the District Court on remand. Stevens filed a dissent, arguing that while the District Court erroneously decided that it lacked jurisdiction, dismissal was nevertheless correct because under Colorado state law, the issues in the suit were precluded from being relitigated.

== Gonzales v. Thomas ==
- Full caption: Alberto R. Gonzales, Attorney General v. Michelle Thomas, David George Thomas, Tyneal Michelle Thomas, Shaldon Waide Thomas
- Citations: 547 U.S. 183; 126 S. Ct. 1613; 164 L. Ed. 2d 358; 2006 U.S. LEXIS 3268; 74 U.S.L.W. 3584
- Prior history: Petition for review granted, remanded, sub nom. Thomas v. Ashcroft, 359 F.3d 1169 (9th Cir. 2004); vacated, motion for rehearing en banc granted, 382 F.3d 1154 (9th Cir. 2004); petition granted, remanded, sub nom. Thomas v. Gonzales, 409 F.3d 1177 (9th Cir. 2005)
- Full text of the opinion: official slip opinion

547 U.S. 183
Decided April 17, 2006.
Ninth Circuit vacated and remanded.

The Court of Appeals had ruled that the Board of Immigration Appeals had failed to consider whether applicants for asylum could base a claim of persecution for membership in a particular social group on their family membership. The court furthermore determined that the applicant's family satisfied the requirement. The Supreme Court ruled that because the Board had not yet developed a factual record on the issue or made its own findings, the court should not have decided that issue itself, but rather left it for the Board to determine on remand.

== Salinas v. United States ==
- Full caption: Jeffrey Jerome Salinas v. United States
- Citations: 547 U.S. 188; 126 S. Ct. 1675; 164 L. Ed. 2d 364; 2006 U.S. LEXIS 3447; 74 U.S.L.W. 3598
- Prior history: Guilty plea entered, defendant sentenced, S.D. Tex.; affirmed as modified, (5th Cir. 2005)
- Full text of the opinion: official slip opinion

547 U.S. 188
Decided April 24, 2006.
Fifth Circuit vacated and remanded.

The Court of Appeals had concluded that the defendant's conviction for simple possession of a controlled substance constituted a "controlled substance offense" for purposes of the sentencing guidelines of the United States Sentencing Commission. However, the Supreme Court vacated, because the definition of "controlled substance offense" requires possession with intent to manufacture, import, export, distribute, or dispense, of which the defendant was not convicted.

== Whitman v. Department of Transportation ==
- Full caption: Terry L. Whitman v. United States Department of Transportation, and Norman Mineta, U.S. Secretary of the Department of Transportation
- Citations: 547 U.S. 512; 2006 U.S. LEXIS 4508
- Prior history: Dismissed, No. A02-0112, 2003 U.S. Dist. LEXIS 26961 (D. Alaska Feb. 26, 2003); affirmed, 382 F.3d 938 (9th Cir. 2004); cert. granted, 125 S. Ct. 2962 (2005)
- Full text of the opinion: official slip opinion

547 U.S. 512
Decided June 5, 2006.
Ninth Circuit vacated and remanded.

The Court of Appeals had affirmed the District Court's judgment that the Civil Service Reform Act (CSRA) did not expressly confer, and therefore precluded, federal court jurisdiction over a grievance suit filed by an FAA employee under his collective-bargaining agreement. The Supreme Court found that his claim fell within the general federal question jurisdiction under 28 U.S.C. § 1331. The question was accordingly not whether the CSRA precluded jurisdiction, but whether it divested the federal courts of the jurisdiction that is generally conferred by section 1331. Because the CSRA treats claims differently based upon where they fall in its statutory scheme, the Supreme Court vacated and remanded the case to the Court of Appeals for it to decide whether Whitman's claim fell within a category of the CSRA that would grant federal courts jurisdiction.

Alito did not participate in the consideration or decision of the case.

== Youngblood v. West Virginia ==
- Full caption: Denver A. Youngblood, Jr. v. West Virginia
- Citations: 547 U.S. 867; 2006 U.S. LEXIS 4884
- Prior history: Defendant convicted, sentenced, Morgan County Circuit Court, Oct. 3, 2003; affirmed, 618 S.E.2d 544 (W. Va. 2005)
- Full text of the opinion: official slip opinion

547 U.S. 867
Decided June 19, 2006.
Supreme Court of Appeals of West Virginia vacated and remanded.

In a rape case, the prosecution withheld exculpatory evidence that was in the form of a note from one of the alleged victims.

Scalia filed a dissent, joined by Thomas. Kennedy filed a dissent.

== Laboratory Corp. of America Holdings v. Metabolite Laboratories, Inc. ==
- Full caption: Laboratory Corporation of America Holdings, dba Labcorp v. Metabo-Lite Laboratories, Inc., et al.
- Citations: 548 U.S. 124; 126 S. Ct. 2921; 165 L. Ed. 2d 399; 2006 U.S. LEXIS 4893; 74 U.S.L.W. 4431; 79 U.S.P.Q.2d (BNA) 1065; 19 Fla. L. Weekly Fed. S 311
- Prior history: Judgment for plaintiff, judgment as a matter of law for defendant denied, No. 99–cv–870 (D. Colo.); affirmed, 370 F.3d 1354 (Fed. Cir. 2004); rehearing denied, rehearing en banc denied, No. 03-1120, 2004 U.S. App. LEXIS 17408 (Fed. Cir. Aug. 5, 2004); cert. granted, 546 U.S. 999 (2005).
- Subsequent history: Lab. Corp. of Am. Holdings v. Metabolite Labs., Inc., 571 F. Supp. 2d 1199 (D. Colo. 2008) (partial relitigation); 599 F.3d 1277 (Fed. Cir. 2010) (denying jurisdiction and transferring appeal); 410 F. App'x 151 (10th Cir. 2011) (affirming summary judgment).
- Full text of the opinion: official slip opinion · Justia

548 U.S. 124
Argued March 21, 2006.
Decided June 22, 2006.
The Court dismissed the writ of certiorari as improvidently granted.

Breyer filed a dissent, joined by Stevens and Souter.

== See also ==
- List of United States Supreme Court cases, volume 546
- List of United States Supreme Court cases, volume 547
- List of United States Supreme Court cases, volume 548
