= League of United Latin American Citizens v. Perry =

- Supreme Court of the United States

Argued March 1, 2006 Decided June 28, 2006
- Full case name: League of United Latin American Citizens, et al. v. Rick Perry, Governor of Texas, et al.
- Docket no.: 05-204
- Citations: 548 U.S. 399 (more) 126 S. Ct. 2594; 165 L. Ed. 2d 609; 2006 U.S. LEXIS 5178

Case history
- Prior: Denying relief, Session v. Perry, 298 F. Supp. 2d 451 (E.D. Tex. 2004); vacating and remanding for reconsideration, Henderson v. Perry, 125 S. Ct. 351 (2004) (mem.); denying relief, 399 F. Supp. 2d 756 (E.D. Tex. 2005).
- Subsequent: Remedial order, League of United Latin American Citizens v. Perry, 457 F. Supp. 2d 716 (E.D. Tex. 2006).

Holding
- Texas's redrawing of District 23’s lines amounts to vote dilution violative of §2 of the Voting Rights Act of 1965, while other newly created districts remain constitutional. The judgment is affirmed in part, reversed in part, vacated in part, and remanded.

Court membership
- Chief Justice John Roberts Associate Justices John P. Stevens · Antonin Scalia; Anthony Kennedy · David Souter; Clarence Thomas · Ruth Bader Ginsburg; Stephen Breyer · Samuel Alito

Case opinions
- Majority: Kennedy (Parts II–A and III), joined by Stevens, Souter, Ginsburg, Breyer
- Plurality: Kennedy (Parts I and IV), joined by Roberts, Alito
- Plurality: Kennedy (Part II–D), joined by Souter, Ginsburg
- Concur/dissent: Roberts, joined by Alito
- Concur/dissent: Stevens, joined by Breyer (Parts I and II)
- Concur/dissent: Scalia, joined by Thomas; Roberts, Alito (Part III)
- Concur/dissent: Souter, joined by Ginsburg
- Concur/dissent: Breyer

Laws applied
- U.S. Const. amend. XIV, Voting Rights Act of 1965

League of United Latin American Citizens v. Perry, 548 U.S. 399 (2006), is a Supreme Court of the United States case in which the Court ruled that only District 23 of the 2003 Texas redistricting violated the Voting Rights Act. The Court refused to throw out the entire plan, ruling that the plaintiffs failed to state a sufficient claim of partisan gerrymandering.

The opinion requires lawmakers to adjust congressional district boundaries in comport with the Court's ruling, though the ruling ultimately did not substantially reduce or reverse the Republican gains as a result of the redistricting in Texas. The Court also declined to resolve a dispute over whether partisan gerrymandering claims present nonjusticiable political questions.

== Background ==
Texas has a long history of controversial gerrymandering. In 1996, the Supreme Court struck down three districts as racial gerrymanders in Bush v. Vera that had been upheld against partisan gerrymandering challenges, foreshadowing future decisions about the justiciability of partisan redistricting.

After the 2000 United States census Democrats and Republicans in the Texas Legislature could not reach an agreement on redistricting and a new plan had to be drawn by a federal three-judge court made up of U.S. Circuit Judge Patrick Higginbotham, and U.S. District Judges John H. Hannah, Jr. and T. John Ward. When Tom DeLay and his Texans for a Republican Majority helped Republicans win total control of the state in the 2002 election, however, they sought to replace the court's redistricting plan. Democratic lawmakers known as the "Killer Ds" and the "Texas Eleven" fled the state to deny the legislature of a quorum, but the clerk of the Texas House of Representatives issued arrest warrants for the legislators and DeLay had federal agencies track their movements. Governor Rick Perry called three special sessions and ultimately passed the new plan. Career staff at the United States Department of Justice Civil Rights Division advised the plan failed preclearance under Section 5 of the Voting Rights Act of 1965 but were overruled by acting Assistant Attorney General Bradley Schlozman.

At the November 2004 election, Republican seats increased from fifteen to twenty-one, with even Martin Frost, the third-ranking Democrat in the House, losing his seat. Private plaintiffs sued, alleging any mid-decade redistricting was illegal, the plan was an unconstitutional partisan gerrymander, and it was in violation of Section 2 of the Voting Rights Act. On January 6, 2004, a three-judge district court now made up of Circuit Judge Higgenbotham, and District Judges Ward and Lee H. Rosenthal rejected all the plaintiffs’ claims, with Judge Ward concurring in part and dissenting in part. On October 18, 2004, however, the Supreme Court vacated and remanded the case after its new plurality decision in Vieth v. Jubelirer readdressed the political question doctrine. On June 9, 2005, the three-judge court rejected all the plaintiffs’ claims again, with Judge Ward writing a special concurrence.

Plaintiffs appealed directly to the U.S. Supreme Court, where two hours of argument were heard on March 1, 2006, with Paul M. Smith appearing for the statewide plaintiffs, Nina Perales of the Mexican American Legal Defense and Educational Fund appearing for the District 23 plaintiffs, Texas Solicitor General Ted Cruz appearing for the state, and then-Deputy U.S. Solicitor General Gregory G. Garre appearing as a friend of Texas.

== Supreme Court ==
On June 28, 2006, the second to last day of the term, a highly fractured Court rejected all of the plaintiffs’ claims except for the vote dilution claim in Texas's 23rd congressional district, producing six different opinions spanning 121 pages of the United States Reports.

=== Statewide claims ===
Justice Anthony Kennedy, joined by Justices David Souter and Ruth Bader Ginsburg, rejected plaintiff’s claim that the statewide plan was an unconstitutional partisan gerrymander. Chief Justice John G. Roberts and Samuel Alito did not join that part of the opinion but concurred in the judgment, while noting that they were “taking no position” on if political gerrymandering claims were even justiciable. Justice Antonin Scalia, joined by Clarence Thomas, also concurred in the judgment but felt that the case should be dismissed because political gerrymandering claims are not justiciable. Justice John Paul Stevens, joined by Stephen Breyer, dissented, arguing that because the plan’s “sole intent” was explicitly partisan, it violated the Equal Protection Clause and that Republicans had created “their own impermissible stranglehold on political power.”

- The plaintiff's argument of this being a statewide unconstitutional partisan gerrymander was rejected 7-2.
- The plaintiff's argument that, when states redistrict voluntarily mid-decade especially on the heels of regaining state legislative majorities, it proves partisan gerrymandering that violates equal protection and one-person-one-vote was rejected. The fact of mid-decade timing itself was judged constitutional in this case on the grounds that a legislative map replacing a court-drawn map served to re-establish legislative primacy in redistricting per Article I.

=== Districts 23 & 25 ===
The Court, now of Justice Kennedy, joined by Justices Souter, Ginsburg, Stevens and Breyer, applied Thornburg v. Gingles (1986) to find vote dilution in District 23 in violation of Section 2 of the Voting Rights Act.

By a 5–4 vote the majority ruled that:

- Old district 23 was a qualified protected majority-minority Latino district (indeed in 2002 on the verge of throwing out the incumbent that wasn't of their choice).
- New district 25 wasn't compact enough to be considered a qualifying replacement majority-minority Latino district. The two Latino communities within new district 25 were more than 300 miles apart, raising the appearance that the district was drawn to pick up as many Latinos as possible without regard to compactness.
- And therefore new District 23 is a section 2 violation of the Voting Rights Act and must be redrawn.
- There is no need to rule on whether or not new district 25 is itself a racial gerrymander in violation of section 2 because the changes to district 23 will of necessity affect district 25 and it is therefore moot. However, the lower court decision that it was not in violation of section 2 is vacated.
- The case is remanded for further proceedings.

==== Dissents on Districts 23 & 25 ====
Chief Justice Roberts, joined by Alito dissented. Justice Scalia also dissented and, joined by the Chief Justice and Justices Thomas and Alito, argued that District 23 violated neither the Voting Rights Act nor the Equal Protection Clause.

- Nowhere in the Voting Rights Act or its legislative history is compactness of districts mentioned and that the majority is causing the jurisprudence of section 2 to diverge more and more from the legislative history.
- New district 25 is more than an adequate replacement for old 23 (if necessarily), and indeed the majority accepts that new district 25 performed better for Latinos in 2004 than old district 23 from 1992—2002.

=== District 24 ===
Justice Kennedy, joined by Chief Justice Roberts and Justice Alito, found that the plan did not crack Texas's 24th congressional district in violation of Section 2 of the Voting Rights Act. Justice Scalia, joined by Thomas, concurred in that judgment but felt the case should be dismissed as non-judicable. Justice Souter, joined by Ginsburg, dissented, arguing to vacate and remand. Justice Stevens dissented, arguing to reverse.

The majority of the court noted that old district 24 had three separate communities to begin with (Whites, Blacks, Latino) and Martin Frost (a White Democrat) never having been challenged in 22 years in a primary made it impossible to dispute the state legislative history that it was specifically created for a White Democrat.

== Practical result ==
On August 4, 2006, the three-judge court made its remedial order. The three-judge court adjusted the lines of the 23rd and four other districts — the 28th (represented by Democrat Henry Cuellar), 25th (Democrat Lloyd Doggett), 15th (Democrat Ruben Hinojosa) and 21st (Republican Lamar S. Smith) — all of which held new primary elections on November 7. Cuellar, Doggett, Hinojosa, and Smith were all reelected, while Henry Bonilla, the Republican representative for the 23rd District, was defeated by Democrat Ciro Rodriguez in a newly 61% Latino district.

== See also ==
- Bush v. Vera (1996)
- List of United States Supreme Court cases, volume 548
