= Randall v. Sorrell =

- Supreme Court of the United States

Argued February 28, 2006 Decided June 26, 2006
- Full case name: Neil Randall, et al. v. William H. Sorrell, et al.
- Docket nos.: 04-1528; 04-1530; 04-1697
- Citations: 548 U.S. 230 (more) 126 S. Ct. 2479; 165 L. Ed. 2d 482; 2006 U.S. LEXIS 5161; 74 U.S.L.W. 4435; 19 Fla. L. Weekly Fed. S 354

Case history
- Prior: Judgment for defendant, sub nom. Landell v. Sorrell, 118 F.Supp.2d 459 (D. Vt. 2001); affirmed in part, vacated in part, 382 F.3d 91 (2d Cir. 2002); rehearing denied, 2005 U.S. App. LEXIS 5884 (2d Cir. Apr. 11, 2005); amended, 406 F.3d 159 (2d Cir. 2005); cert. granted, sub nom. Randall v. Sorrell, 545 U.S. 1165 (2005).

Holding
- Vermont's campaign finance restrictions violated the First Amendment. Second Circuit reversed and remanded.

Court membership
- Chief Justice John Roberts Associate Justices John P. Stevens · Antonin Scalia; Anthony Kennedy · David Souter; Clarence Thomas · Ruth Bader Ginsburg; Stephen Breyer · Samuel Alito

Case opinions
- Plurality: Breyer, joined by Roberts; Alito (all but Parts II–B–1 and II–B–2)
- Concurrence: Alito (in part)
- Concurrence: Kennedy (in judgment)
- Concurrence: Thomas (in judgment), joined by Scalia
- Dissent: Stevens
- Dissent: Souter, joined by Ginsburg; Stevens (Parts II and III)

Laws applied
- U.S. Const. amend. I

Randall v. Sorrell, 548 U.S. 230 (2006), is a decision by the Supreme Court of the United States involving a Vermont law which placed a cap on financial donations made to politicians. The court ruled that Vermont's law, the strictest in the nation, unconstitutionally hindered the citizens' First Amendment right to free speech. A key issue in the case was the 1976 case Buckley v. Valeo, which many justices felt needed to be revisited.

== Opinion of the Court ==
The 6–3 ruling dealt with three individual issues before the court.

- Did Vermont's law violate the First Amendment, Fourteenth Amendment, following the Supreme Court ruling in Buckley v. Valeo, which struck down limits on campaign expenditures as unconstitutional?
- Did Vermont violate the right of political parties to make independent expenditures in accordance with the aforementioned amendments, following the Supreme Court ruling in Colorado Republican Federal Campaign Committee v. FEC?
- Did Vermont's contribution limits, which are the lowest in the country, allow only a single maximum contribution over a two-year election cycle, and prohibit state political parties from contributing more than $400 to their gubernatorial candidate, fall below an acceptable constitutional threshold and should be struck down? In Buckley, the Supreme Court had upheld contribution limits on the basis of the government's "compelling interest" in preventing political corruption or its appearance, but had left open the possibility that if limits were set so low as to prevent speakers from effectively presenting their message to the public, such limits might be unconstitutional.

The State of Vermont argued that new circumstances and experiences since Buckley v. Valeo was decided in 1976 suggested that the law should be upheld as Constitutional.

The Supreme Court ruled against the state of Vermont on all three issues, reaffirming both Buckley and Colorado Republican Federal Campaign Committee and striking down the law as unconstitutional. Randall is particularly important as the first case in which the Supreme Court has struck down a contribution limit as unconstitutionally low.

== See also ==
- James Bopp
