= Environmental law in the United States =

US environmental policy

United States environmental law concerns legal standards to protect human health and improve the natural environment of the United States.

== History ==
The history of environmental law in the US can be traced back to early roots in common law doctrines, for example, the law of nuisance and the public trust doctrine. The first environmental statute was the Rivers and Harbors Act of 1899, which has been largely superseded by the Clean Water Act (CWA). However, most current major environmental statutes, such as the federal statutes listed above, were passed in the time spanning the late 1960s through the early 1980s. Prior to the passage of these statutes, most federal environmental laws were not nearly as comprehensive.

Silent Spring, a 1962 book by Rachel Carson, is frequently credited as launching the environmental movement in the United States. The book documented the effects of pesticides, especially DDT, on birds and other wildlife. Among the most significant environmental disasters of the 1960s was the 1969 Santa Barbara oil spill, which generated considerable public outrage as Congress was considering several major pieces of environmental legislation. (See Environmental movement in the United States.)

One lawsuit that has been widely recognized as one of the earliest environmental cases is Scenic Hudson Preservation Conference v. Federal Power Commission, decided in 1965 by the Second Circuit Court of Appeals, prior to passage of the major federal environmental statutes. The case helped halt the construction of a power plant on Storm King Mountain in New York State. The case has been described as giving birth to environmental litigation and helping create the legal doctrine of standing to bring environmental claims. The Scenic Hudson case also is said to have helped inspire the passage of the National Environmental Policy Act (NEPA), and the creation of such environmental advocacy groups as the Natural Resources Defense Council.

=== 21st century ===
In the early 21st century US Congress was no longer pursuing environmental lawmaking. According to Richard Lazarus, the role of the judiciary shifted. Environmental justice for disadvantaged communities finally became a forefront issue. As of 2023, environmental law became seriously destabilized with the election of President Donald Trump in 2016.

== Law schools ==
=== 2026 rankings ===
U.S. News & World Report ranked The Elisabeth Haub School of Law #1 in Environmental law, followed by Lewis & Clark Law School (#2 tie)/UC Berkeley School of Law (#2 tie), UCLA School of Law (#4), and Harvard Law School (#5 tie)/Vermont Law School (#5 tie), in the top five for environmental law programs. The Lexinter Law Directory ranked the top five of the “16 Best Environmental Law Schools" as New York University School of Law (#1), The Elisabeth Haub School of Law (#2), Harvard Law School (#3), Yale Law School (#4), and Columbia Law School (#5). Above the Law (website) summarized the top five environmental law programs that received an A+ from the "National Jurist’s preLaw magazine" in alphabetical order as: Georgetown University Law Center, George Washington University Law School, Harvard Law School, Lewis & Clark Law School, and (The Elisabeth Haub School of Law), Pace University.

== Scope ==
=== International ===
Environmental laws are laws that protect the environment. The term "environmental law" encompasses treaties, statutes, regulations, conventions, and policies designed to protect the natural environment and manage the impact of human activities on ecosystems and natural resources, such as forests, minerals, or fisheries. It addresses issues such as pollution control, resource conservation, biodiversity protection, climate change mitigation, and sustainable development. As part of both national and international legal frameworks, environmental law seeks to balance environmental preservation with economic and social needs, often through regulatory mechanisms, enforcement measures, and incentives for compliance.

The field emerged prominently in the mid-20th century as industrialization and environmental degradation spurred global awareness, culminating in landmark agreements like the 1972 Stockholm Conference and the 1992 Rio Declaration. Key principles include the precautionary principle, the polluter pays principle, and intergenerational equity. Modern environmental law intersects with human rights, international trade, and energy policy.

Internationally, treaties such as the Paris Agreement (2015), the Kyoto Protocol (1997), and the Convention on Biological Diversity (1992) establish cooperative frameworks for addressing transboundary issues. Nationally, laws like the UK's Clean Air Act 1956 and the US Toxic Substances Control Act of 1976 establish regulations to limit pollution and manage chemical safety. Enforcement varies by jurisdiction, often involving governmental agencies, judicial systems, and international organizations. Environmental impact assessments are a common way to enforce environmental law.

Challenges in environmental law include reconciling economic growth with sustainability, determining adequate levels of compensation, and addressing enforcement gaps in international contexts. The field continues to evolve in response to emerging crises such as biodiversity loss, plastic pollution in oceans, and climate change.

=== In the United States ===
Congress has enacted federal statutes intended to address pollution control and remediation, including, for example, the Clean Air Act (air pollution), the Clean Water Act (water pollution), Resource Conservation and Recovery Act (solid waste and hazardous waste), and the Comprehensive Environmental Response, Compensation, and Liability Act (CERCLA, or Superfund) (contaminated site cleanup). There are also federal laws governing natural resources use and biodiversity which are strongly influenced by environmental principles, including the Endangered Species Act, National Forest Management Act, and Coastal Zone Management Act. The National Environmental Policy Act, governing environmental impact review in actions undertaken or approved by the U.S. federal government, may implicate all of these areas.

Once Congress enacts an environmental statute, a federal agency is responsible for creating specific regulations which implement and enforce the law. The United States Environmental Protection Agency (EPA) is the federal agency responsible for most environmental regulations.

Federalism has played a role in the shape of national environmental legislation. Many federal environmental laws employ cooperative federalism mechanisms, and many federal regulatory programs are administered in coordination with the states. Furthermore, the states generally have enacted their own laws to cover areas not preempted by federal law. This includes areas where Congress had acted in limited fashion (e.g., state site cleanup laws to handle sites outside the Superfund program) and where Congress has left regulation primarily to the states (e.g., water resources law).

== Legal sources ==
Laws from every stratum of the laws of the United States pertain to environmental issues. Congress has passed a number of landmark environmental regulatory regimes, but many other federal laws are equally important, if less comprehensive. Concurrently, the legislatures of the fifty states have passed innumerable comparable sets of laws. These state and federal systems are foliated with layer upon layer of administrative regulation. Meanwhile, the US judicial system reviews not only the legislative enactments, but also the administrative decisions of the many agencies dealing with environmental issues. Where the statutes and regulations end, the common law begins.

=== Federal regulation ===
Consistent with the federal statutes that they administer, US federal agencies promulgate regulations in the Code of Federal Regulations that fill out the broad programs enacted by Congress. Primary among these is Title 40 of the Code of Federal Regulations, containing the regulations of the Environmental Protection Agency (EPA). Other important CFR sections include Title 10 (energy), Title 18 (Conservation of Power and Water Resources), Title 21 (Food and Drugs), Title 33 (Navigable Waters), Title 36 (Parks, Forests and Public Property), Title 43 (Public Lands: Interior) and Title 50 (Wildlife and Fisheries).

=== Judicial decisions ===
The federal and state judiciaries have played an important role in the development of environmental law in the United States, in many cases resolving significant controversy regarding the application of federal environmental laws in favor of environmental interests. The decisions of the Supreme Court in cases such as Calvert Cliffs Coordinating Committee v. U.S. Atomic Energy Commission (broadly reading the procedural requirements of NEPA), Tennessee Valley Authority v. Hill (broadly reading the Endangered Species Act), and, much more recently, Massachusetts v. EPA (requiring EPA to reconsider regulation of greenhouse gases under the Clean Air Act) have had policy impacts far beyond the facts of the particular case.

=== Common law ===
The common law of tort is an important tool for the resolution of environmental disputes that fall beyond the confines of regulated activity. Prior to the modern proliferation of environmental regulation, the doctrines of nuisance (public or private), trespass, negligence, and strict liability apportioned harm and assigned liability for activities that today would be considered pollution and likely governed by regulatory regimes. These doctrines remain relevant, and most recently have been used by plaintiffs seeking to impose liability for the consequences of global climate change.

The common law also continues to play a leading role in American water law, in the doctrines of riparian rights and prior appropriation.

== Administration ==
In the United States, responsibilities for the administration of environmental laws are divided between numerous federal and state agencies with varying, overlapping, and sometimes conflicting missions. EPA is the most well-known federal agency, with jurisdiction over many of the country's national air, water and waste and hazardous substance programs. Other federal agencies, such as the U.S. Fish and Wildlife Service and National Park Service pursue primarily conservation missions, while still others, such as the United States Forest Service and the Bureau of Land Management, tend to focus more on beneficial use of natural resources.

Federal agencies operate within the limits of federal jurisdiction. For example, EPA's jurisdiction under the Clean Water Act is limited to "waters of the United States". In many cases federal laws allow for more stringent regulation by states, and of transfer of certain federally mandated responsibilities from federal to state control. US state governments, therefore, administering state law adopted under state police powers or federal law by delegation, uniformly include environmental agencies. The extent to which state environmental laws are based on or depart from federal law varies from jurisdiction to jurisdiction.

Thus, while a permit to fill non-federal wetlands might require a permit from a single state agency, larger and more complex endeavors—for example, the construction of a coal-fired power plant—might require approvals from numerous federal and state agencies.

=== Enforcement ===
In the United States, violations of environmental laws are generally civil offenses, resulting in monetary penalties and, perhaps, civil sanctions such as injunction. Many environmental laws also provide for criminal penalties for egregious violations. Some federal laws, such as the Clean Water Act, also allow a U.S. citizen to file a lawsuit against a violator, if the government has failed to take enforcement action.

Environmental agencies often include separate enforcement offices, with duties including monitoring permitted activities, performing compliance inspections, issuing citations and prosecuting wrongdoing (civilly or criminally, depending on the violation). EPA's Office of Enforcement and Compliance Assurance is one such agency. Others, such as the United States Park Police, carry out more traditional law enforcement activities.

Adjudicatory proceedings for environmental violations are often handled by the agencies themselves under the structures of administrative law. In some cases, appeals are also handled internally (for example, EPA's Environmental Appeals Board). Generally, final agency determinations may subsequently be appealed to the appropriate court.

As environmental law becomes more widespread in the United States, another form of enforcement is emerging. Economic sanctions and incentives are the next wave of enforcement techniques. However, other researchers believe that the best way to enforce environmental regulation is to enforce non-environmental laws that can also have positive results for the environment. Some researchers have found that this leads to better environmental performance with bipartisan support

== Environmental protection cases ==
=== Water ===
- EI duPont de Nemours & Co. v. Train, 430 U.S. 112 (1977)
- Friends of the Earth, Inc. v. Laidlaw Environmental Services, Inc. (2000)
- S. D. Warren Co. v. Maine Board of Environmental Protection (2006)
- Rapanos v. United States (2006)
- County of Maui v. Hawaii Wildlife Fund (2020)
- Sackett v. Environmental Protection Agency (2023)

=== Air pollution ===
- Union Elec. Co. v. EPA, 427 U.S. 246 (1976)
- Chevron USA v. Natural Resources Defense Council, 467 U.S. 837 (1984)
- Massachusetts v. Environmental Protection Agency, 549 U.S. 497 (2007)

=== Solid and hazardous waste ===
- City of Philadelphia v. New Jersey (1978)
- City of Chicago v. Environmental Defense Fund, 511 U.S. 328 (1994)

== See also ==
- US administrative law
- Environmental policy of the United States
- Energy policy of the United States
- US corporate law
