= Los Angeles County Flood Control District v. Natural Resources Defense Council, Inc. =

Los Angeles County Flood Control District v. NRDC
- Supreme Court of the United States

Argued December 4, 2012 Decided January 8, 2013
- Full case name: Los Angeles County Flood Control District v. National Resources Defense Council, et al.
- Docket no.: 11-460
- Citations: 568 U.S. 78 (more) 133 S. Ct. 710; 184 L. Ed. 2d 547; 2013 U.S. LEXIS 597; 75 ERC 1641; 81 U.S.L.W. 4031

Case history
- Prior: 673 F.3d 880, 886 (9th Cir. 2011) rehearing denied; 636 F.3d 1235 (9th Cir. 2011); cert. granted, 567 U.S. 933 (2012).
- Subsequent: Nat. Res. Def. Council, Inc. v. Cty. of L.A., 725 F.3d 1194 (9th Cir. 2013); cert. denied, 572 U.S. 1100 (2014); on remand, No. 2:08-cv-01467 (C.D. Cal. Mar. 30, 2015); reversed, 840 F.3d 1098 (9th Cir. 2016).

Holding
- The flow of water from an improved portion of a navigable waterway into an unimproved portion of the same waterway does not qualify as a "discharge of a pollutant" under the Clean Water Act

Court membership
- Chief Justice John Roberts Associate Justices Antonin Scalia · Anthony Kennedy; Clarence Thomas · Ruth Bader Ginsburg; Stephen Breyer · Samuel Alito; Sonia Sotomayor · Elena Kagan

Case opinions
- Majority: Ginsburg, joined by Roberts, Scalia, Kennedy, Thomas, Breyer, Sotomayor, Kagan
- Concurrence: Alito (in judgment)

Laws applied
- U.S. Const. art. III; Clean Water Act

Los Angeles County Flood Control District v. Natural Resources Defense Council, Inc., 568 U.S. 78 (2013), is a United States Supreme Court case in which the Natural Resources Defense Council and Santa Monica Baykeeper challenged the Los Angeles County Flood Control District (District) for violating the terms of its National Pollutant Discharge Elimination System (NPDES) permit as shown in water quality measurements from monitoring stations within the Los Angeles and San Gabriel Rivers. The Supreme Court, by a unanimous 9-0 vote, reversed and remanded the Ninth Circuit's ruling on the grounds that the flow of water from an improved portion of a navigable waterway into an unimproved portion of the same waterway does not qualify as a "discharge of a pollutant" under the Clean Water Act.

== Parties ==
=== Los Angeles County Flood Control District ===
The Los Angeles County Flood Control District is the petitioner in this particular case. The district was established upon adoption of the Los Angeles County Flood Control Act in 1915, after a disastrous regional flood occurred. The district's primary purpose is to provide flood protection, water conservation, recreation, and aesthetic enhancement within its boundaries. As of 1985, the responsibilities and authority of the district were transferred to the Los Angeles County Department of Public Works. The Flood Control District encompasses more than 3,000 square miles and 85 cities in Southern California. It includes approximately 500 miles of open channel, 2,800 miles of underground storm drainage pipelines, and an estimated 120,000 catch basins.

=== Natural Resources Defense Council ===
The Natural Resources Defense Council and Santa Monica Baykeeper are the respondent. The Natural Resources Defense Council is a nationwide environmental action group consisting of over 1.3 million members and over 350 lawyers, scientists and other professionals. Santa Monica Baykeeper is a non-profit organization that aims to protect and restore the Santa Monica Bay, San Pedro Bay and adjacent waters through enforcement, field work, and community action.

== Background ==
The district operates a "municipal separate storm sewer system" (MS4), which is a conveyance or a system of conveyances that collects and transports stormwater runoff into waters of the U.S. The district's MS4 transports stormwater through rivers and channels flowing to the Pacific Ocean. Because stormwater is often heavily polluted from various non-point sources, the Clean Water Act and its implementing regulations require certain MS4s to obtain a National Pollutant Discharge Elimination System (NPDES) permit before discharging stormwater into navigable waters. Between 2002 and 2008, monitoring stations in the Los Angeles River, San Gabriel River, Santa Clara River, and Malibu Creek continually detected water pollution levels that exceeded its MS4 permit in its stormwater channel system. Some of the pollution levels exceeded included high levels of aluminum, copper, cyanide, fecal coliform bacteria, and zinc.

== Prior cases ==
=== District court opinion ===
In 2008, the Natural Resources Defense Council and Santa Monica Baykeeper (collectively NRDC) filed a citizen-enforcement action against the district and county in the Central District of California, and alleged that the district violated the NPDES permit and the Clean Water Act. NRDC sought to impose liability on the district for its permit violations in four rivers: the Los Angeles River, San Gabriel River, Santa Clara River, and Malibu Creek. The district argued that this issue was resolved by the court's earlier decision in the South Florida Water Management Dist. v. Miccosukee Tribe (541 U.S. 95) case, which determined that transferring water within a single water body does not constitute a "discharge." The district court initially denied summary judgment because the evidence did not clearly show whether the standards-exceeding pollutant had been discharged through the district's MS4. Thus, the district court concluded that NRDC failed to show whether there had been a "discharge" from a "point source" within the statutory meanings of those terms. The district court granted summary judgment to the district on these claims and concluded that the record was insufficient to warrant a finding that the MS4 had discharged stormwater containing the pollutants detected at the downstream monitoring stations.

==== South Florida Water Management District v. Miccosukee Tribe of Indians ====
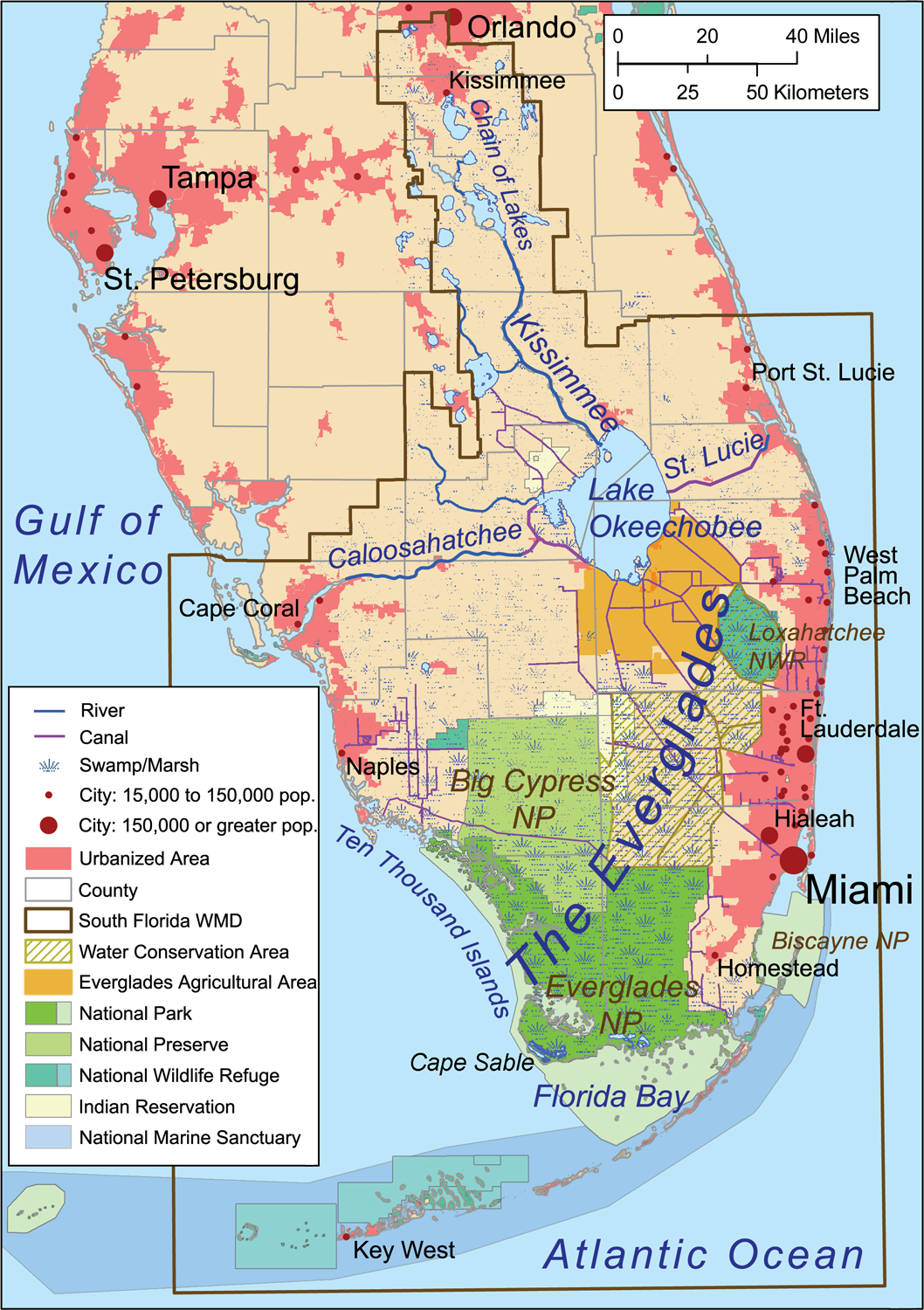
Southern third of the Florida Peninsula, showing the area managed by the South Florida Water Management District

In this 2004 U.S. Supreme Court case, the Miccosukee Tribe challenged the South Florida Water Management District on an issue related to the operation of a new pump station that transferred water from a concrete canal to a large undeveloped wetland area as part of the Central and South Florida Flood Control Project. During rain events, stormwater collected in the canal contained contaminants such as phosphorus and fertilizers from agricultural and urban land uses. The district impounded water in the wetland area, a remnant of the original South Florida Everglades, to conserve fresh water that might otherwise flow directly to the ocean and to preserve wetland habitat. When water levels in the canal rose above a set level, the pump would transfer water out of the canal and empty the water in the canal. In doing so, the phosphorus-containing the water altered the wetland's ecosystem, which was naturally low in phosphorus, and stimulated the growth of algae and plants that were uncommon in the Everglades ecosystem.

The Miccosukee Tribe filed suit under the Clean Water Act, which prohibits "the discharge of any pollutant by any person" unless done in compliance with the Act. The Tribe claimed that the pump station required an NPDES permit, because it moved phosphorus-laden water from the canal into the wetland area, but the district contended that the pump's operation did not constitute the "discharge of a pollutant" under the Act. The district court granted the Tribe summary judgment, and the Eleventh Circuit affirmed. For the purposes of NPDES permitting requirements, the Government (as an impartial adviser to the district) contended that all water bodies that fall within the Act's definition of "navigable water" (which are defined as "the waters of the U.S.") should be viewed collectively. Since the Act requires NPDES permits only when there is an addition of a pollutant to "navigable waters," this approach implied that such permits are not required when water is transferred from one navigable water, unaltered, into another navigable water body. However, because neither the district nor the Government raised the "unitary waters" approach before the Eleventh Circuit or in their briefs respecting certiori and because some factual issues remained unresolved, the U.S. Supreme Court declined to resolve the unitary waters argument and the case was remanded to the lower court.

=== Appeals Court opinion ===
The U.S. Court of Appeals for the Ninth Circuit reversed in part, finding that the NRDC was entitled to summary judgment on its claims regarding the Los Angeles River and San Gabriel River because the monitoring stations are located within the MS4 owned and operated by the district. The U.S. Court of Appeals held that the district was liable for the discharge of pollutants that occurred when the polluted stormwater detected at the monitoring stations flowed out of the concrete-lined portions of the rivers, where the monitoring stations are located, into lower, unlined portions of the same rivers. However, with regard to the Santa Clara River and Malibu Creek, NRDC failed to provide adequate evidence for the district court to determine if stormwater discharged from the MS4 caused or contributed to exceedances of permitted water quality levels. As such, the NRDC was entitled to summary judgment on the district's liability for discharges into the Los Angeles and San Gabriel Rivers but not the Santa Clara River or Malibu Creek.

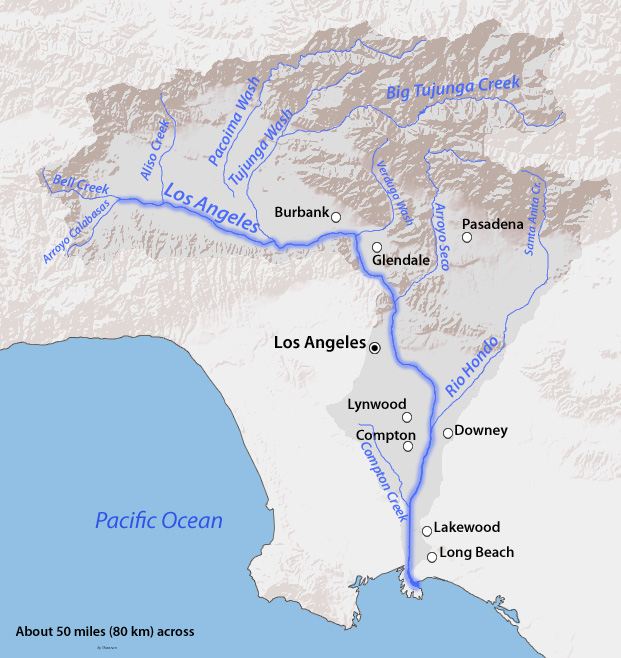
Map of the Los Angeles River Watershed

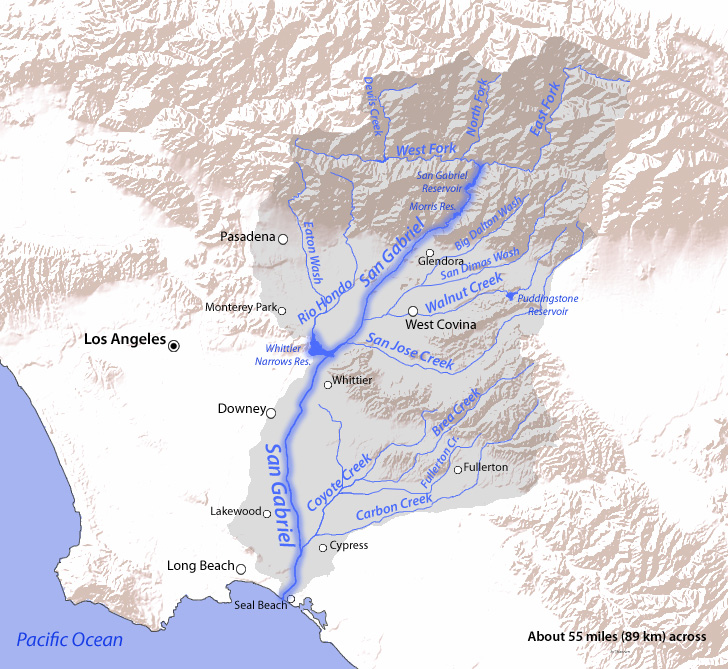
Map of the San Gabriel River Watershed

== Supreme Court decision ==
=== Issues ===
The Clean Water Act regulates discharges of pollutants, including discharges of pollutants from municipal stormwater systems. The petition of a writ of certiorari (filed October 11, 2011) posed two questions to the Supreme Court:

1. Do "navigable waters of the United States" include only "naturally occurring" bodies of water so that construction of engineered channels or other man-made improvements to a river as part of municipal flood and storm control renders the improved portion no longer a "navigable water" under the Clean Water Act?

2. When water flows from one portion of a river that is a navigable water of the United States, through a concrete channel or other engineered improvement in the river constructed for flood and stormwater control as part of a municipal separate storm sewer system, into a lower portion of the same river, can there be a "discharge" from an "outfall" under the Clean Water Act, notwithstanding this Court's holding in South Florida Water Management District v. Miccosukee Tribe of Indians, 541 U.S. 95, 105 (2004), that transfer of water within a single body of water cannot constitute a "discharge" for purposes of the Act?

=== Granting of certiorari ===
The petition for a writ of certiorari sought to expand the definition of "navigable waters of the United States" to potentially include human engineered improvements, and to also reverse the verdict of the Ninth Circuit based on the Supreme Court's prior ruling in South Florida Water Management District v. Miccosukee Tribe of Indians.

On June 25, 2012 the Supreme Court granted certiorari and limited to Question 2 set forth in the initial petition for a writ of certiorari.

The Supreme Court granted the certiorari in order to address the Ninth Circuit's verdict which reversed a previous decision and held that the Los Angeles County Flood Control District was liable due to the discharge of pollutants that occurred when polluted water was detected at the monitoring stations as it flowed out through the concrete channel to unimproved portions of the river. The Supreme Court decided to limit its scope to the latter of the two questions, leaving the first to the lower courts.

== Arguments ==
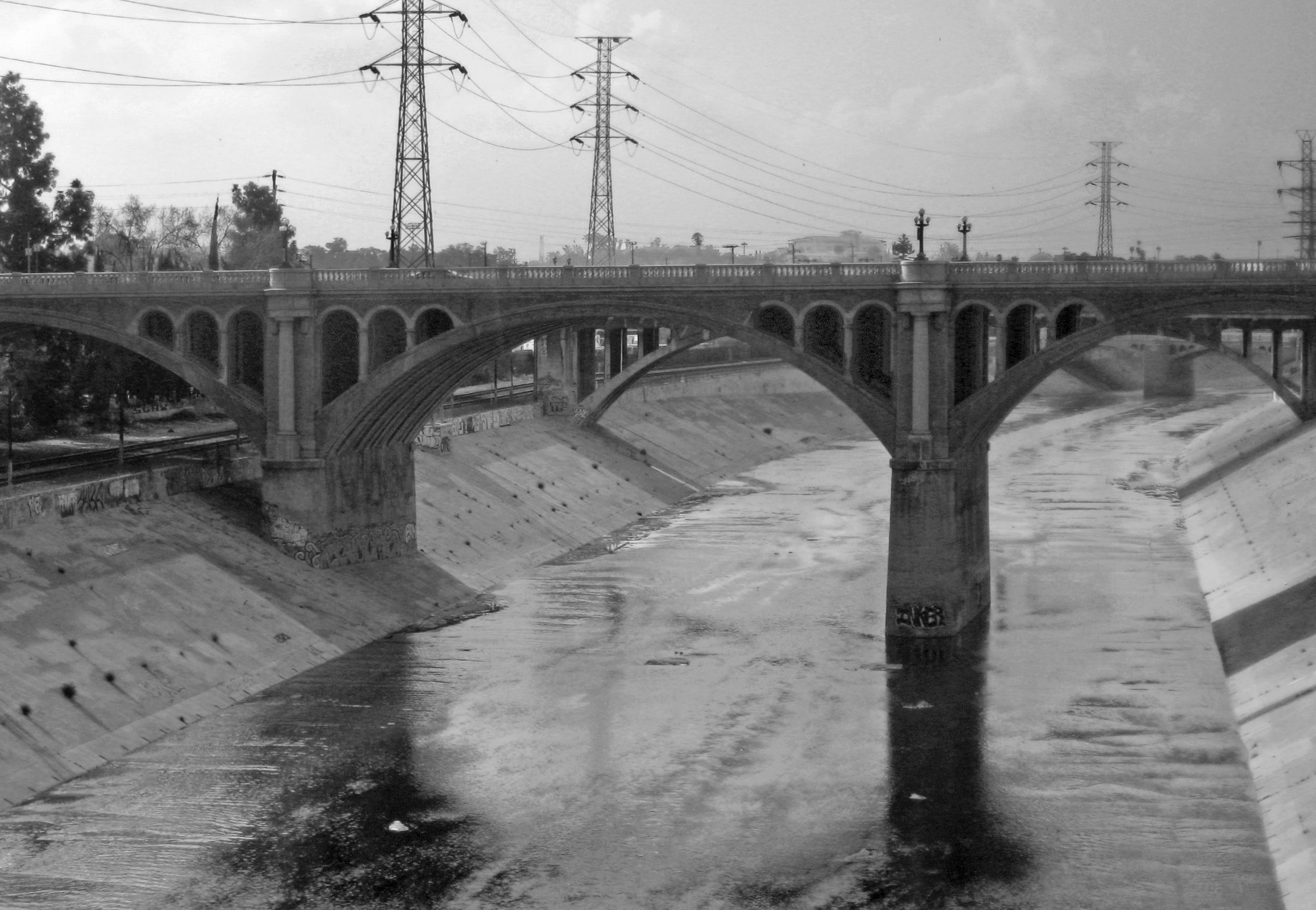
Los Angeles River Bridge

The case was argued on December 4, 2012 by NRDC senior attorney Aaron Colangelo for respondents and GMSR partner Timothy T. Coates for the petitioner L.A. County. Essentially conceding that the premise upon which the Ninth Circuit's decision was based was incorrect, the NRDC and Baykeeper sought to argue that the exceedances detected at monitoring stations themselves sufficed in establishing the liability of the district under the Clean Water Act for its upstream discharges. NRDC felt that the Court of Appeals came to the correct decision, albeit for the wrong reasons, in their evaluation of the discharge of pollutants from an improved portion to an unimproved portion of the same waters. The NRDC and Baykeeper contended that the exceedances detected at the instream monitoring stations were sufficient to establish the district's liability under the Clean Water Act for upstream discharges. In addition, the NRDC argued that under the terms of the permit, the district had agreed to be severally liable with its co-permittees for any excess pollution in the river picked up by the monitoring stations.

The district sought to argue that under the EPA's 2008 water transfer rule (40 C.F.R. § 122.3(i)) it was not liable for violating its permit. The NRDC, however, pointed out that the water transfer rules did not apply in the cases of MS4s stating that "[m]unicipal separate storm sewer systems...are clearly subject to regulation under the Act. CWA section 402(p)."

The district argued that the issue granted certiorari by the Supreme Court had to be resolved in favor of the district on the basis of previous standing. Again, this point was not in contention on the part of the NRDC. As the first issue upon which the petition for certiorari was not going to be addressed in court, the district sought to argue the alternative monitoring argument that the NRDC was attempting to bring forth. The district argued that the monitoring theory itself was contrary to the Clean Water Act, which imposes liability only where it is shown that a permitee has discharged in violation of permit terms. The Supreme Court ruled that their grant of certiorari was only to evaluate the Court of Appeals ruling as it related to the prior standing and "did not address or indicate any opinion on the issue the NRDC and Baykeeper seek to substitute."

== Opinion of the court ==
The case was argued on December 4, 2012 with a decision being issued on January 8, 2013.

Justice Ginsburg delivered the opinion of the court which held that the flow from an improved portion of a navigable waterway into an unimproved portion of the same waterway does not constitute a "discharge of a pollutant" under the Clean Water Act. This was based on the standing of the South Florida Water Management Dist. v. Miccosukee Tribe. Based on this, the court found that the Ninth Circuit's decision was not in accordance with this hold and reversed and remanded the decision.

== Significance of the case ==
Some environmental groups expressed concern that the U.S. Supreme Court decision inappropriately relied on the Court's past decision on the South Florida Water Management District v. Miccosukee Tribe of Indians case. While the Court was asked to determine whether the transfer of water that arguably contained pollutants from one part of a water body into another part of that same water body needed a permit to discharge pollutants in the Miccosukee case, there is no doubt that municipal storm sewers need permits to discharge into rivers in the Los Angeles Flood Control District v. NRDC case. Outside parties asserted that the two situations have nothing in common.

In general, several parties believe that the U.S. Supreme Court's decision is narrow in its scope, and questioned why the Supreme Court had decided to hear the case rather than just reverse the Ninth Circuit's decision. However, the reversal of the Ninth Circuit's judgment against the Los Angeles County Flood Control District in the case implies that local water quality advocates will continue to pressure the local regulator, the Regional Water Quality Control Board, to ensure that the new municipal stormwater permit effectively implements its water quality improvement measures.

Additionally, while the Supreme Court decided against addressing the first question raised in the certiorari, if it had been addressed, it would have further defined "navigable waters" under the Clean Water Act.

Some observers of the case contend that there are additional lessons that can be taken from the Supreme Court case. By not defending the decision made by the Ninth Circuit, the NRDC was able to steer the Court's attention to more plausible grounds in an effort to keep the case alive for a remand.
