= Hanousek =

Hanousek (feminine Hanousková) is a Czech surname.

Notable people with the surname include:

- Marek Hanousek (born 1991), Czech footballer
- Matěj Hanousek (born 1993), Czech footballer
- Matt Hanousek (born 1963), American football player

== See also ==
- Hanousek v. United States, 1999 United States federal case
