= Sackett v. Environmental Protection Agency (2023) =

- Supreme Court of the United States

Argued October 3, 2022 Decided May 25, 2023
- Full case name: Michael Sackett, et ux. v. Environmental Protection Agency, et al.
- Docket no.: 21-454
- Citations: 598 U.S. 651 (more)
- Argument: Oral argument
- Opinion announcement: Opinion announcement

Questions presented
- Whether the United States Court of Appeals for the Ninth Circuit set forth the proper test for determining whether wetlands are "waters of the United States" under the Clean Water Act, 33 U.S.C. § 1362(7).

Holding
- Only wetlands with a "continuous surface connection" with waters of the United States, which are relatively permanent bodies of water connected to "traditional interstate navigable waters", are covered by the Clean Water Act.

Court membership
- Chief Justice John Roberts Associate Justices Clarence Thomas · Samuel Alito; Sonia Sotomayor · Elena Kagan; Neil Gorsuch · Brett Kavanaugh; Amy Coney Barrett · Ketanji Brown Jackson

Case opinions
- Majority: Alito, joined by Roberts, Thomas, Gorsuch, Barrett
- Concurrence: Thomas, joined by Gorsuch
- Concurrence: Kagan (in judgment), joined by Sotomayor, Jackson
- Concurrence: Kavanaugh (in judgment), joined by Sotomayor, Kagan, Jackson

Laws applied
- Clean Water Act

Sackett v. Environmental Protection Agency, 598 U.S. 651 (2023), also known as Sackett II (to distinguish it from the 2012 case), was a United States Supreme Court case in which the court held that the Clean Water Act covers only wetlands that have a "continuous surface connection" to "waters of the United States" connected to "traditional interstate navigable waters".

== Background ==
In Sackett v. Environmental Protection Agency, the petitioners, Michael and Chantell Sackett, were represented by Damien M. Schiff of the Pacific Legal Foundation, while the respondent, the Environmental Protection Agency (EPA), was represented by Brian H. Fletcher of the Office of the Solicitor General of the United States.

Before 1972, the Federal Water Pollution Control Act (FWPCA) gave the EPA oversight of pollution into the United States' navigable waters. The Clean Water Act was enacted in 1972 to amend the FWPCA to expand oversight beyond navigable waters to all "waters of the United States". This phrase has led to debates about which water sources qualify, including many legal cases. By the late 1980s, the EPA and the United States Army Corps of Engineers developed a shared definition of what water sources qualify as "waters of the United States", incorporating the results of these cases. This definition of "waters" included "wetlands adjacent to waters" already protected by the EPA's and Corps' rule-making.

The 2006 Supreme Court case Rapanos v. United States consolidated two cases that raised the question of whether wetlands that were hydrologically isolated or not adjacent to other waters of the United States could be covered by the CWA or the EPA/Corps rule-making. The Court was split, 4–1–4. In the plurality opinion, Justice Antonin Scalia wrote that the distinction for protected wetlands should be established by a bright-line rule, covering only wetlands next to "relatively permanent, standing or continuously flowing bodies of water", or those connected to other waters through surface waters. Chief Justice John Roberts and Justices Samuel Alito and Clarence Thomas joined Scalia's opinion. Justice Anthony Kennedy joined in the Court's decision, but wrote a separate concurrence offering a looser interpretation of protected wetlands as those that are part of a "significant nexus" with a navigable body of water. The minority opinion, by Justice John Paul Stevens and joined by Justices David Souter, Ruth Bader Ginsburg, and Stephen G. Breyer, accused the plurality of threatening the environment, failure to defer to the executive branch, and judicial activism.

Lower courts used both the plurality and the nexus definition in subsequent cases involving wetlands. The EPA and the Corps adopted a new definition of protected wetlands that incorporated both of the Rapanos definitions into new rules.

== Case history ==
Chantell and Michael Sackett purchased a 0.63-acre vacant lot near Priest Lake, Idaho, in 2004. They began constructing their home there in 2007, after obtaining building permits from local authorities. Shortly after, United States Environmental Protection Agency officials informed the Sacketts that their lot might be subject to regulation under the Clean Water Act, as it contained "wetlands" that were "navigable waters". The EPA directed the Sacketts to halt construction until they received a permit from the United States Army Corps of Engineers. The Sacketts received an administrative compliance order from the EPA in the fall of 2007. In 2008, they sued under the Administrative Procedure Act. The lower courts held EPA compliance orders were not subject to the APA, but the Supreme Court reversed in a 2012 decision, now known as Sackett I.

The Sacketts argued to the United States District Court for the District of Idaho on remand from the Supreme Court that their land was not subject to the CWA. In 2019, the district court applied Kennedy's test from Rapanos, and held the lot was regulated by the CWA. The United States Court of Appeals for the Ninth Circuit affirmed in August 2021, and rejected an attempt by the EPA to moot the litigation by withdrawing the compliance order.

The Sacketts filed a petition for a writ of certiorari. The petitioners sought to determine whether the Rapanos decision should be revisited to instead adopt the plurality opinion's test to determine whether a wetland fell under the Clean Water Act's jurisdiction. Amici curiae in support of the Sacketts were submitted by the Cato Institute, the US Chamber of Commerce, and Americans for Prosperity, while the Constitutional Accountability Center, Public Citizen, and major American scientific societies like the Association for the Sciences of Limnology and Oceanography, and Society of Wetland Scientists filed amici supporting the EPA.

== Supreme Court ==
Certiorari was granted in the case on January 24, 2022, and the court heard oral arguments on October 3, 2022. The decision was handed down on May 25, 2023. The court voted unanimously to reverse the Ninth Circuit, but split 5–4 on the rationale.

The majority opinion, penned by Justice Samuel Alito and joined by Chief Justice John Roberts and Justices Clarence Thomas, Neil Gorsuch, and Amy Coney Barrett, concluded that the Rapanos plurality was correct, and that within the scope of the CWA, "the CWA's use of 'waters' encompasses 'only those relatively permanent, standing or continuously flowing bodies of water 'forming geographical features' that are described in ordinary parlance as 'streams, oceans, rivers, and lakes'." The Court held that waters are not protected by the Clean Water Act unless they have a "continuous surface connection" to key lakes and rivers that affect interstate commerce. This means that waters that have an underground connection to those lakes/rivers and even the waters that are separated from the lakes/rivers by man-made barriers are no longer protected by the Clean Water Act.

Justice Brett Kavanaugh, joined by Justices Sonia Sotomayor, Elena Kagan, and Ketanji Brown Jackson, agreed with the majority opinion that the CWA did not apply to the Sacketts' property, but argued that the majority's new definition was incorrect and will have significant effects on regulated waters. Kavanaugh wrote: "Because of the movement of water between adjacent wetlands and other waters, pollutants in wetlands often end up in adjacent rivers, lakes, and other waters. Natural barriers such as berms and dunes do not block all water flow and are in fact evidence of a regular connection between a water and a wetland. Similarly, artificial barriers such as dikes and levees typically do not block all water flow, and those artificial structures were often built to control the surface water connection between the wetland and the water. The scientific evidence overwhelmingly demonstrates that wetlands separated from covered waters by those kinds of berms or barriers, for example, still play an important role in protecting neighboring and downstream waters, including by filtering pollutants, storing water, and providing flood control. In short, those adjacent wetlands may affect downstream water quality and flood control in many of the same ways that adjoining wetlands can."

== Impact ==
Environmental advocacy group Earthjustice claims that over 59 million acres of wetlands are threatened by this ruling. Peat bogs are particularly vulnerable, as they are generally isolated from larger bodies of water.

The EPA and Army Corps introduced their proposed final rule on wetlands, reflecting the opinion of the Supreme Court, in August 2023. The rule reduces the amount of wetlands covered by federal law, and lets the states decide how much protection to give other wetlands.

== Related cases ==
Related cases include Orchard Hill Bldg. Co. v. United States Army Corps of Eng'rs, County of Maui v. Hawaii Wildlife Fund, and United States v. Riverside Bayview.
