= Clean Water Act =

1972 U.S. federal law regulating water pollution

- Other short titles: Federal Water Pollution Control Act Amendments of 1972
- Long title: An Act to amend the Federal Water Pollution Control Act.
- Acronyms (colloquial): CWA
- Enacted by: the 92nd United States Congress
- Effective: October 18, 1972

Citations
- Public law: 92-500
- Statutes at Large: 86 Stat. 816

Codification
- Acts amended: Federal Water Pollution Control Act
- Titles amended: 33 U.S.C.: Navigable Waters
- U.S.C. sections created: 33 U.S.C. §§ 1251–1387
- U.S.C. sections amended: 33 U.S.C. ch. 23 § 1151

Legislative history
- Introduced in the Senate as S. 2770 by Edmund Muskie (D–ME) on October 28, 1971; Committee consideration by Senate Public Works Committee; Passed the Senate on November 2, 1971 (86-0); Passed the House on March 29, 1972; Reported by the joint conference committee on October 4, 1972; agreed to by the House on October 4, 1972 (366-11) and by the Senate on October 4, 1972 (74-0); Vetoed by President Richard Nixon on October 17, 1972; Overridden by the Senate on October 17, 1972 (52-12); Overridden by the House and became law on October 18, 1972 (247-23)

Major amendments
- Clean Water Act of 1977; Water Quality Act of 1987; Clean Boating Act of 2008; Water Infrastructure Finance and Innovation Act of 2014; America's Water Infrastructure Act of 2018

United States Supreme Court cases
- List: EI duPont de Nemours & Co. v. Train, 430 U.S. 112 (1977); Costle v. Pacific Legal Foundation, 445 U.S. 198 (1980); EPA v. Nat'l Crushed Stone Assn., 449 U.S. 64 (1980); City of Milwaukee v. Illinois, 451 U.S. 304 (1981); Weinberger v. Romero-Barcelo, 456 U.S. 305 (1982); Chemical Manufacturers Assn. v. NRDC, 470 U.S. 116 (1985); United States v. Riverside Bayview, 474 U.S. 121 (1985); Department of Energy v. Ohio, 503 U.S. 607 (1992); PUD No. 1 of Jefferson Cty. v. Washington Dept. of Ecology, 511 U.S. 700 (1994); Solid Waste Agency of Northern Cook County v. Army Corps of Engineers, 531 U.S. 159 (2001); Borden Ranch Partnership v. Army Corps of Engineers, 537 U.S. 99 (2002); South Florida Water Management District v. Miccosukee Tribe, 541 U.S. 95 (2004); S. D. Warren Co. v. Maine Board of Environmental Protection, 547 U.S. 370 (2006); Rapanos v. United States, 547 U.S. 715 (2006); National Ass'n of Home Builders v. Defenders of Wildlife, 551 U.S. 644 (2007); Entergy Corp. v. Riverkeeper Inc., 556 U.S. 208 (2009); Coeur Alaska, Inc. v. Southeast Alaska Conservation Council, 557 U.S. 261 (2009); Sackett v. EPA I, 566 U.S. 120 (2012); Los Angeles County Flood Control District v. Natural Resources Defense Council, Inc., 568 U.S. 78 (2013); Decker v. Northwest Environmental Defense Center, 568 U.S. 597 (2013); Army Corps of Engineers v. Hawkes Co., No. 15-290, 578 U.S. ___ (2016); National Association of Manufacturers v. Department of Defense, No. 16-299, 583 U.S. ___ (2018); County of Maui v. Hawaii Wildlife Fund, No. 18-260, 590 U.S. ___ (2020); Sackett v. EPA II, No. 21-454, 598 U.S. ___ (2023); City and County of San Francisco v. EPA, No. 23-753, 604 U.S. ___ (2025)

The Clean Water Act (CWA) is the primary federal law in the United States governing water pollution. Its objective is to restore and maintain the chemical, physical, and biological integrity of the nation's waters; recognizing the primary responsibilities of the states in addressing pollution and providing assistance to states to do so, including funding for publicly owned treatment works for the improvement of wastewater treatment; and maintaining the integrity of wetlands.

The Clean Water Act was one of the first and most influential modern environmental laws in the United States. Its laws and regulations are primarily administered by the U.S. Environmental Protection Agency (EPA) in coordination with state governments, though some of its provisions, such as those involving filling or dredging, are administered by the U.S. Army Corps of Engineers. Its implementing regulations are codified at 40 C.F.R. Subchapters D, N, and O (Parts 100–140, 401–471, and 501–503).

Technically, the name of the law is the Federal Water Pollution Control Act. The first FWPCA was enacted in 1948, but took on its modern form when completely rewritten in 1972 in an act entitled the Federal Water Pollution Control Act Amendments of 1972. Major changes have subsequently been introduced via amendatory legislation including the Clean Water Act of 1977 and the Water Quality Act (WQA) of 1987.

The Clean Water Act does not directly address groundwater contamination. Groundwater protection provisions are included in the Safe Drinking Water Act, Resource Conservation and Recovery Act, and the Superfund act.

== Background ==
=== Health implications of water pollution ===
Contamination of drinking water supplies can not only occur in the source water but also in the distribution system. Sources of water contamination include naturally occurring chemicals and minerals (arsenic, radon, uranium), local land use practices (fertilizers, pesticides, concentrated feeding operations), manufacturing processes, and sewer overflows or wastewater releases. Some examples of health implications of water contamination are gastrointestinal illness, reproductive problems, and neurological disorders. Infants, young children, pregnant women, the elderly, and people whose immune systems are compromised because of AIDS, chemotherapy, or transplant medications, may be especially susceptible to illness from some contaminants.

==== Gastrointestinal illness ====
Gastrointestinal disorders include such conditions as constipation, irritable bowel syndrome, hemorrhoids, anal fissures, perianal abscesses, anal fistulas, perianal infections, diverticular diseases, colitis, colon polyps and cancer. In general, children and the elderly are at highest risk for gastrointestinal disease. In a study investigating the association between drinking water quality and gastrointestinal illness in the elderly of Philadelphia, scientists found water quality 9 to 11 days before the visit was negatively associated with hospital admissions for gastrointestinal illness, with an interquartile range increase in turbidity being associated with a 9% increase. The association was stronger in those over 75 than in the population aged 65–74. This example is a small reflection of residents of the United States remain at risk of waterborne gastrointestinal illness under current water treatment practices.

==== Reproductive problems ====
Reproductive problems refer to any illness of the reproductive system. New research by Brunel University and the University of Exeter strengthens the relationship between water pollution and rising male fertility problems. Study identified a group of chemicals that act as antiandrogens in polluted water, which inhibits the function of the male hormone testosterone, reducing male fertility.

==== Neurological disorders ====
Neurological disorders are diseases of the brain, spine and the nerves that connect them. The new study of more than 700 people in California's Central Valley found that those who likely consumed contaminated private well water had a higher rate of Parkinson's. The risk was 90 percent higher for those who had private wells near fields sprayed with widely used insecticides. Unlike water supplies in large cities, private wells are mostly unregulated and are not monitored for contaminants. Many of them exist at shallow depths of less than 20 yards, and some of the crop chemicals used to kill pests and weeds can flow into ground water. Therefore, private wells are likely to contain pesticides, which can attack developing brains (womb or infancy), leading to neurological diseases later in life. A study led by UCLA epidemiology professor Beate Ritz suggests that "people with Parkinson's were more likely to have consumed private well water, and had consumed it on average 4.3 years longer than those who did not have the disease."

=== Ecosystem impacts of pollution ===
Water pollution can result in the degradation of aquatic ecosystems—fresh, coastal, and ocean waters. Industrial wastewater discharges may include organic and inorganic chemicals, pharmaceuticals, and heavy metals. Anoxia (oxygen depletion), caused by untreated sewage or industrial discharges can harm fish and other animal populations. Oxygen-depleting substances may be natural materials such as plant matter (e.g. leaves and grass) as well as human-made chemicals. Other natural and anthropogenic substances may cause turbidity (cloudiness) which blocks light and disrupts plant growth, and clogs the gills of some fish species. Nutrient pollution typically causes algal blooms and bacterial growth, resulting in the depletion of dissolved oxygen in water and causing substantial environmental degradation. Thermal pollution, typically caused by discharges of heated water from power plants and factories, decreases the level of dissolved oxygen in ambient water, which can harm fish, amphibians and other aquatic organisms, and reduce biodiversity.

== Waters protected ==
In the 2023 Supreme Court case Sackett v. EPA, the court ruled that only "relatively permanent" waters (such as streams, oceans, rivers and lakes) connected to "navigable waters," and wetlands that are "indistinguishable" from such waters, are covered under the CWA.

The 1972 statute frequently uses the term "navigable waters" but also defines the term as "waters of the United States, including the territorial seas." Regulations interpreting the 1972 law have included water features such as intermittent streams, playa lakes, prairie potholes, sloughs and wetlands as "waters of the United States." In 2006, in Rapanos v. United States, a plurality of the Supreme Court, in a decision authored by Justice Antonin Scalia, held that the term "waters of the United States" "includes only those relatively permanent, standing or continuously flowing bodies of water 'forming geographic features' that are described in ordinary parlance as 'streams[,]... oceans, rivers, [and] lakes.'" The concurrent written opinion of Justice Anthony Kennedy defined the term more broadly, including wetlands with a "significant nexus" to traditionally defined navigable waters. Since Rapanos, the EPA and the U.S. Army Corps of Engineers have attempted to define protected waters in the context of Rapanos through the 2015 Clean Water Rule, but this has been highly controversial. The agencies considered the CWA to cover bodies of water with a "significant nexus" with traditional navigable waters, according with Justice Kennedy's definition.

In 2023, the Supreme Court rejected the "significant nexus" test in Sackett v. EPA and established the current definition. This definition "significantly tightens" the test for federal Clean Water Act regulation.

== Pollution control strategy ==
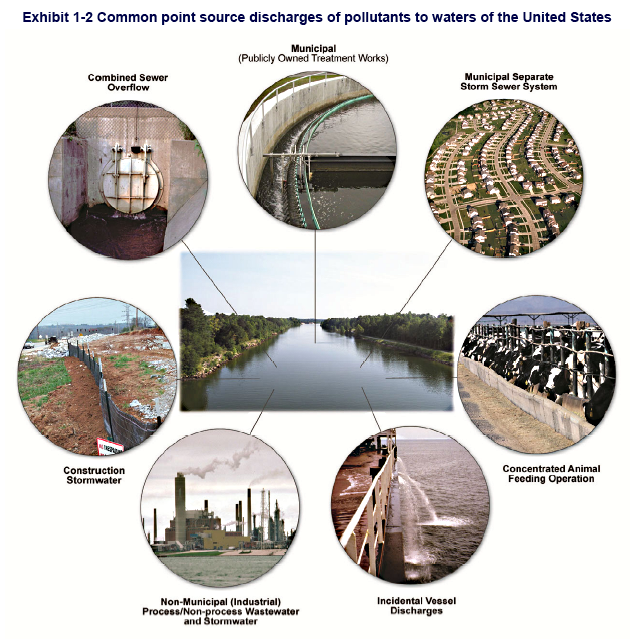
Common point source discharges

=== Point sources ===
The CWA introduced the National Pollutant Discharge Elimination System (NPDES), a permit system for regulating point sources of pollution. Point sources include:

- Industrial facilities (including manufacturing, mining, shipping activities, oil and gas extraction and service industries).
- Municipal governments (particularly sewage treatment plants) and other government facilities (such as military bases), and
- Some agricultural facilities, such as animal feedlots.

Point sources may not discharge pollutants to surface waters without an NPDES permit. The system is managed by EPA in partnership with state environmental agencies. EPA has authorized 47 states to issue permits directly to the discharging facilities. The CWA also allows tribes to issue permits, but no tribes have been authorized by EPA. In the remaining states and territories, the permits are issued by an EPA regional office. (See Titles III and IV.)

In legislation prior to 1972, Congress had authorized states to develop water quality standards, which would limit discharges from facilities based on the characteristics of individual water bodies. However, those standards were to be developed only for interstate waters, and the science to support that process (i.e. data, methodology) was in the early stages of development. That system was not effective, and there was no permit system in place to enforce the requirements. In the 1972 CWA, Congress added the permit system and a requirement for technology-based effluent limitations.

In the 2020 Supreme Court case County of Maui v. Hawaii Wildlife Fund, the Court validated that some discharges may not be point sources, but are the "functional equivalent of a direct discharge" to navigable waters, such as in this case, the injection of wastewater into groundwater injection wells. As of the time of the case's decision, this was not an area the EPA has established regulations for, and the Court instructed the EPA to work with the courts to define such functional equivalents. The Court wrote that this would likely depend most on the distance the pollutants traveled and time to reach navigable waters, with consideration for the material that the pollutants traveled through, any physical or chemical interaction of the pollutants with components in the ground, and how much of the pollutant makes it to the navigable water. In July 2021, following the Supreme Court decision, the Hawaii District Court determined that the Maui County sewage treatment plant's groundwater injection of sewage was the "functional equivalent of a direct discharge" and required the plant to obtain an NPDES permit.

==== Technology-based standards ====
The 1972 CWA created a new requirement for technology-based standards for point source discharges. EPA develops those standards for categories of dischargers, based on the performance of pollution control technologies without regard to the conditions of a particular receiving water body. The intent of Congress was to create a "level playing field" by establishing a basic national discharge standard for all facilities within a category, using a "Best Available Technology." The standard becomes the minimum regulatory requirement in a permit. If the national standard is not sufficiently protective at a particular location, then water quality standards may be employed, and the permit authority (state or EPA) will include water quality-based effluent limitations in the permit.

==== Water quality standards ====
The 1972 act authorized continued use of the water quality-based approach, but in coordination with the technology-based standards. After application of technology-based standards to a permit, if water quality is still impaired for the particular water body, then the permit agency may add water quality-based limitations to that permit. The additional limitations are to be more stringent than the technology-based limitations and would require the permittee to install additional controls. Water quality standards consist of four basic elements: 1) Designated uses; 2) Water quality criteria; 3) Antidegradation policy and 4) General policies.

===== Designated uses =====
The water quality standards regulations require states and federally recognized tribes/nations to specify appropriate uses for water bodies in their jurisdiction. Identification of appropriate water uses takes into consideration the usage and value of public water supply, protection of fish, wildlife, recreational waters, agricultural, industrial and navigational water ways. Suitability of a water body is examined by states and tribes/nations usages based on physical, chemical, and biological characteristics. States and tribes/nations also examine geographical settings, scenic qualities and economic considerations to determine fitness of designated uses for water bodies. If those standards indicate designated uses to be less than those currently attained, states or tribes are required to revise standards to reflect the uses that are actually being attained. For any body of water with designated uses that do not include "fishable/swimmable" target use that is identified in section 101(a)(2) of CWA, a "Use Attainability Analysis" must be conducted. Every three years, such bodies of water must be re-examined to verify if new information is available that demand a revision of the standard. If new information is available that specify "fishable/swimmable" uses can be attained, the use must be designated.

===== Water quality criteria =====
States and federally recognized Indigenous Nations protect their designated areas by adopting water quality criteria that the EPA publishes under CWA section 304(a), modifying the criteria to reflect site-specific conditions or adopting criteria based on other scientifically defensible methods. Water quality criteria can be numeric criteria that toxicity causes are known for protection against pollutants. A narrative criterion is water quality criteria which serves as a basis for limiting the toxicity of waste discharges to aquatic species. A biological criterion is based on the aquatic community which describes the number and types of species in a water body. A nutrient criterion solely protects against nutrient over enrichment, and a sediment criterion describes conditions of contaminated and uncontaminated sediments to avoid undesirable effects.

===== Anti-degradation policy =====
The water quality regulations include an anti-degradation policy that requires states and tribes to establish a three-tiered anti-degradation program. Anti-degradation procedures identify steps and questions that need to be addressed when specific activities affect water quality. "Tier 1" requirements are applicable to all surface waters. These requirements maintain and protect current uses and the water quality conditions to support existing uses. Current uses are identified by showing that fishing, swimming, and other water uses have occurred and are suitable since November 28, 1975. "Tier 2" requirements maintains and protects water bodies with existing conditions that are better to support "fishable/swimmable" uses pursuant to CWA section 101(a)(2). "Tier 3" requirements maintain and protect water quality in "outstanding national resource waters" (ONRWs), which are the highest quality waters in the US with ecological significance.

===== General policies =====
States and Native American tribes also adopt general policies pertaining to water quality standards that are subject to review and approval by the EPA. Those provisions on water quality standards include mixing zones, variance, and low flow policies. Mixing zone policy is defined area surrounding a point source discharge where sewage is diluted by water. Methodology of mixing zone procedure determines the location, size, shape and quality of mixing zones. Variance policy temporarily relax water quality standard and are alternatives to removing a designated use. States and tribes may include variance as part of their water quality standard. Variance is subject to public review every three years and warrant development towards improvement of water quality. The "Low Flow" policy pertains to states and tribes water quality standards that identify procedures applied to determining critical low flow conditions.

==== Laboratory test methods ====
Most NPDES permittees are required to collect samples of their wastewater and analyze the samples using test methods specified in their permits. EPA publishes analytical methods that are used by the permittees. The procedures identify chemical compounds and microbiological components of wastewater, as required by the act. Some of the chemical compound test procedures include the chemical detection of trace elements such as cancer-causing metals. Some microbiological test procedures use microbial source tracking (MST) techniques to calculate and identify biological and chemical trends that may support new regulatory limits on pollutants.

=== Nonpoint sources ===
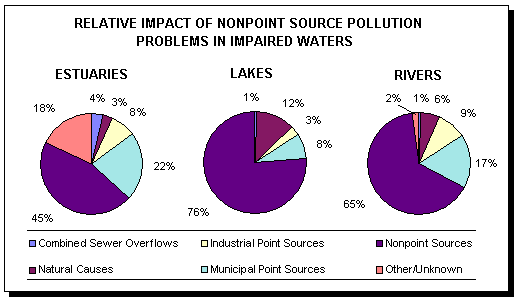
Nonpoint source pollutants, such as sediments, nutrients, pesticides, fertilizers and animal wastes, account for more than half of the pollution in U.S. waters.

Congress exempted some water pollution sources from the point source definition in the 1972 CWA and was unclear on the status of some other sources. Such sources were therefore considered to be nonpoint sources that were not subject to the permit program.

Agricultural stormwater discharges and irrigation return flows were specifically exempted from permit requirements. Congress, however, provided support for research, technical and financial assistance programs at the U.S. Department of Agriculture to improve runoff management practices on farms. See Natural Resources Conservation Service.

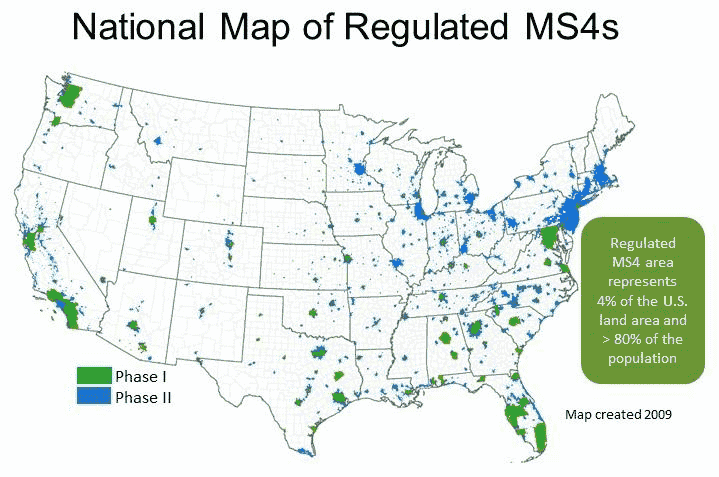
Map of municipal separate storm sewer systems

Stormwater runoff from industrial sources, municipal storm drains, and other sources were not specifically addressed in the 1972 law. EPA had declined to include urban runoff and industrial stormwater discharges in its initial implementation of the NPDES program, and subsequently the agency was sued by an environmental group. In 1977, the D.C. Circuit Court of Appeals ruled that stormwater discharges must be covered by the permit program.

Research conducted starting in the late 1970s and 1980s indicated that stormwater runoff was a significant cause of water quality impairment in many parts of the US. In the early 1980s, the EPA conducted the Nationwide Urban Runoff Program (NURP) to document the extent of the urban stormwater problem. The agency began to develop regulations for stormwater permit coverage but encountered resistance from industry and municipalities, and there were additional rounds of litigation. The litigation was pending when Congress considered further amendments to the CWA in 1986.

In the Water Quality Act of 1987, Congress responded to the stormwater problem by defining industrial stormwater dischargers and municipal separate storm sewer systems (often called "MS4") as point sources, and requiring them to obtain NPDES permits, by specific deadlines. The permit exemption for agricultural discharges continued, but Congress created several programs and grants, including a demonstration grant program at the EPA to expand the research and development of non-point controls and management practices.

=== Financing of pollution controls ===
Congress created a major public works financing program for municipal sewage treatment in the 1972 CWA. A system of grants for construction of municipal sewage treatment plants was authorized and funded in Title II. In the initial program, the federal portion of each grant was up to 75 percent of a facility's capital cost, with the remainder financed by the state. In subsequent amendments Congress reduced the federal proportion of the grants and in the 1987 WQA transitioned to a revolving loan program in Title VI. Industrial and other private facilities are required to finance their own treatment improvements based on the polluter pays principle.

==== Water Infrastructure Finance and Innovation Act ====
Congress passed the Water Infrastructure Finance and Innovation Act of 2014 (WIFIA) to provide an expanded credit program for water and wastewater infrastructure projects, with broader eligibility criteria than the previously authorized revolving fund unter CWA Title VI. Pursuant to WIFIA, EPA established its Water Infrastructure and Resiliency Finance Center in 2015 to help local governments and municipal utilities design innovative financing mechanisms, including public–private partnerships. Congress amended the WIFIA program in 2015, 2016 and 2018.

== Major statutory provisions ==
This Act has six titles.

=== Title I - Research and Related Programs ===
Title I includes a Declaration of Goals and Policy and various grant authorizations for research programs and pollution control programs. Some of the programs authorized by the 1972 law are ongoing (e.g. section 104 research programs, section 106 pollution control programs, section 117 Chesapeake Bay Program) while other programs no longer receive funds from Congress and have been discontinued.

=== Title II - Grants for Construction of Treatment Works ===
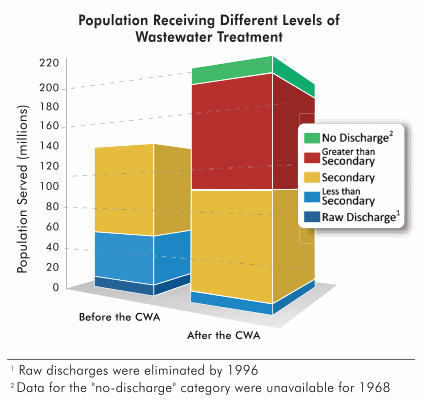
The construction grants program funded new sewage treatment plants and upgrading existing plants to national secondary treatment standards.

To assist municipalities in building or expanding sewage treatment plants, also known as publicly owned treatment works (POTW), Title II established a system of construction grants. The 1972 CWA provided that federal funds would support 75% of project costs, with state and local funds providing the remaining 25%. In 1981 Congress reduced the federal funding proportion for most grants to 55%.

The construction grant program was replaced by the Clean Water State Revolving Fund in the 1987 WQA (see Title VI), although some local utilities continued to receive "special purpose project grants" directly from Congress, through a budgetary procedure known as "earmarking."

=== Title III - Standards and enforcement ===
==== Discharge permits required ====
Section 301 of the Act prohibits discharges to waters of the U.S. except with a permit. See Title IV for discussion of permit programs. Recreational vessels are exempt from the permit requirements, but vessel operators must implement Best Management Practices to control their discharges. See Regulation of ship pollution in the United States.

==== Technology-Based Standards Program ====
Under the 1972 act EPA began to issue technology-based standards for municipal and industrial sources:

- Municipal sewage treatment plants (POTW) are required to meet secondary treatment standards.
- Effluent guidelines (for existing sources) and New Source Performance Standards (NSPS) are issued for categories of industrial facilities discharging directly to surface waters.
- Categorical Pretreatment Standards are issued to industrial users (also called "indirect dischargers") contributing wastes to POTW. These standards are developed in conjunction with the effluent guidelines program. As with effluent guidelines and NSPS, pretreatment standards consists of Pretreatment Standards for Existing Sources (PSES) and Pretreatment Standards for New Sources (PSNS). There are 28 categories with pretreatment standards as of 2023.

As of 2023 the effluent guidelines and categorical pretreatment standards regulations have been published for 59 categories and apply to between 35,000 and 45,000 facilities that discharge directly to the nation's waters,129,000 facilities that discharge to POTWs, and construction sites. These regulations are responsible for preventing the discharge of almost 700 billion pounds of pollutants each year. EPA has updated some categories since their initial promulgation and has added new categories.

The secondary treatment standards for POTWs and the effluent guidelines are implemented through NPDES permits (see Title IV.) The categorical pretreatment standards are typically implemented by POTWs through permits that they issue to their industrial users.

==== Water Quality Standards Program ====
The CWA requires states to monitor their water bodies and establish Water Quality Standards for them. Water Quality Standards (WQS) are risk-based requirements which set site-specific allowable pollutant levels for individual water bodies, such as rivers, lakes, streams and wetlands. States set WQS by designating uses for the water body (e.g., recreation, water supply, aquatic life, agriculture) and applying water quality criteria (numeric pollutant concentrations and narrative requirements) to protect the designated uses. An antidegradation policy is also issued by each state to maintain and protect existing uses and high quality waters.

If a state fails to issue WQS, EPA is required to issue standards for that state.

Water bodies that do not meet applicable water quality standards with technology-based controls alone are placed on the section 303(d) list of water bodies not meeting standards. Water bodies on the 303(d) list require development of a Total Maximum Daily Load (TMDL). A TMDL is a calculation of the maximum amount of a pollutant that a water body can receive and still meet WQS. The TMDL is determined after study of the specific properties of the water body and the pollutant sources that contribute to the non-compliant status. Generally, the TMDL determines load based on a Waste Load Allocation (WLA), Load Allocation (LA), and Margin of Safety (MOS). Once the TMDL assessment is completed and the maximum pollutant loading capacity defined, an implementation plan is developed that outlines the measures needed to reduce pollutant loading to the non-compliant water body, and bring it into compliance.

Following the issuance of a TMDL for a water body, implementation of the requirements involves modification to NPDES permits for facilities discharging to the water body to meet the WLA allocated to the water body (see Title IV). The development of WQS and TMDL is a complex process, both scientifically and legally, and it is a resource-intensive process for state agencies.

More than half of U.S. stream and river miles continue to violate water quality standards. Surveys of lakes, ponds and reservoirs indicated that about 70 percent were impaired (measured on a surface area basis), and a little more than 70 percent of the nation's coastlines, and 90 percent of the surveyed ocean and near coastal areas were also impaired.

==== National Water Quality Inventory ====
The primary mode of informing the quality of water of rivers, lakes, streams, ponds, estuaries, coastal waters and wetlands of the U.S. is through the National Water Quality Inventory Report. Water quality assessments are conducted pursuant to water quality standards adopted by states and other jurisdictions (territories, interstate commissions and tribes). The report is conveyed to Congress as a means to inform Congress and the public of compliance with quality standards established by states, territories and tribes. The assessments identify water quality problems within the states and jurisdictions, list the impaired and threatened water bodies, and identify non-point sources that contribute to poor water quality. Every two years states must submit reports that describe water quality conditions to EPA with a complete inquiry of social and economic costs and benefits of achieving goals of the Act.

==== Enforcement ====
Under section 309, EPA can issue administrative orders against violators, and seek civil or criminal penalties when necessary:

- For a first offense of criminal negligence, the minimum fine is $2,500, with a maximum of $25,000 fine per day of violation. A violator may also receive up to a year in jail. On a second offense, a maximum fine of $50,000 per day may be issued.
- For a knowing endangerment violation, i.e. placing another person in imminent danger of death or serious bodily injury, a fine may be issued up to $250,000 and/or imprisonment up to 15 years for an individual, or up to $1,000,000 for an organization.
- For civil violations, EPA currently can seek up to $66,712 per violation per day.

States that are authorized by EPA to administer the NPDES program must have authority to enforce permit requirements under their respective state laws.

==== Federal facilities ====
Military bases, national parks and other federal facilities must comply with CWA provisions.

==== Thermal pollution ====
Section 316 requires standards for thermal pollution discharges, as well as standards for cooling water intake structures (e.g., fish screens). These standards are applicable to power plants and other industrial facilities.

==== Nonpoint Source Management Program ====
The 1987 amendments created the Nonpoint Source Management Program under CWA section 319. This program provides grants to states, territories and Indian tribes to support demonstration projects, technology transfer, education, training, technical assistance and related activities designed to reduce nonpoint source pollution. Grant funding for the program averaged $216 million annually for Fiscal Years 2000 through 2009.

==== Military vessels ====
Congress amended the CWA in 1996 to require development of Uniform National Discharge Standards ("UNDS") for military vessels. EPA and the Department of Defense published standards in 2017 and 2020.

=== Title IV - Permits and licenses ===
==== State certification of compliance ====
States are required to certify that discharges authorized by federal permits will not violate the state's water quality standards.

==== NPDES permits for point sources ====
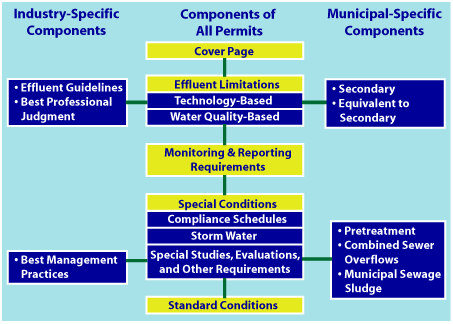
Components of an NPDES permit

The NPDES permits program is authorized by CWA section 402. The initial permits issued in the 1970s and early 1980s focused on POTWs and industrial wastewater—typically "process" wastewater and cooling water where applicable, and in some cases, industrial stormwater. The 1987 WQA expanded the program to cover stormwater discharges explicitly, both from municipal separate storm sewer systems (MS4) and industrial sources. The MS4 NPDES permits require regulated municipalities to use Best Management Practices to reduce pollutants to the "Maximum Extent Practicable." MS4s serve over 80% of the US population and provide drainage for 4% of the land area.

POTWs with combined sewers are required to comply with the national Combined Sewer Overflow Control Policy, published by EPA in 1994. The policy requires municipalities to make improvements to reduce or eliminate overflow-related pollution problems. About 860 communities in the US have combined sewer systems, serving about 40 million people.

Non-stormwater permits typically include numeric effluent limitations for specific pollutants. A numeric limitation quantifies the maximum pollutant load or concentration allowed in the discharge, e.g., 30 mg/L of biochemical oxygen demand. Exceeding a numeric limitation constitutes a violation of the permit, and the discharger is subject to fines as laid out in section 309. Facilities must periodically monitor their effluent (i.e., collect and analyze wastewater samples), and submit Discharge Monitoring Reports to the appropriate agency, to demonstrate compliance. Stormwater permits typically require facilities to prepare a Stormwater Pollution Prevention Plan and implement best management practices, but do not specify numeric effluent limits and may not include regular monitoring requirements. Some permits cover both stormwater and non-stormwater discharges. NPDES permits must be reissued every five years. Permit agencies (EPA, states, tribes) must provide notice to the public of pending permits and provide an opportunity for public comment.

In 2012, EPA estimated that there are over 500,000 stormwater permittees. This number includes permanent facilities such as municipal (POTW, MS4) and industrial plants; and construction sites, which are temporary stormwater dischargers.

==== Dredge and fill permits ====
Section 404 requires that a discharger of dredged or fill material obtain a permit, unless the activity is eligible for an exemption. Essentially, all discharges affecting the bottom elevation of a jurisdictional water body require a permit from the U.S. Army Corps of Engineers (USACE). These permits are an essential part of protecting streams and wetlands, which are often filled by land developers. Wetlands are vital to the ecosystem in filtering streams and rivers and providing habitat for wildlife, although the extent to which wetlands may be regulated under the Clean Water Act has been substantially limited by the Supreme Court's ruling in Sackett v. Environmental Protection Agency.

There are two main types of wetlands permits: general permits and individual permits. General permits change periodically and cover broad categories of activities, and require the permittee to comply with all stated conditions. General permits (such as the "Nationwide Permits") are issued for fill activities that will result in minimal adverse effects to the environment. Individual permits are utilized for actions that are not addressed by a general permit, or that do not meet the conditions of a General Permit. In addition, individual permits typically require more analysis than do the general permits, and usually require much more time to prepare the application and to process the permit.

When the USACE processes an application for an Individual Permit, it must issue a public notice describing the proposed action described in the permit application. Although the Corps District Engineer makes the decision to grant a permit, the EPA Administrator may veto a permit if it is not reasonable. Before making such a decision, however, EPA must consult with the USACE. A USACE permit typically expires after five years.

Mountaintop removal mining requires a section 404 permit when soil and rock from the mining operation is placed in streams and wetlands (commonly called a "valley fill"). Pollutant discharges from valley fills to streams also requires an NPDES permit.

===== Exemptions =====
After passage of the CWA in 1972, a controversy arose as to the application of section 404 to agriculture and certain other ordinary land-use activities. The Act was interpreted by some to place restrictions on virtually all placement of dredged materials in wetlands and other waters of the United States, raising concern that the federal government was about to place all agricultural activities under the jurisdiction of USACE. For opponents of the Act, section 404 had, as a result of this concern, become a symbol of dramatic over-regulation. When Congress considered the 1977 CWA Amendments, a significant issue was to ensure that certain agricultural activities and other selected activities, could continue without the government's supervision—in other words, completely outside the regulatory or permit jurisdiction of any federal agency.

The 1977 amendments included a set of six section 404 exemptions. For example, totally new activities such as construction of farm roads, Sec. 1344(f)(1)(E), construction of farm or stock ponds or irrigation ditches, and minor agricultural drainage, Sec. 1344(f)(1)(A), all are exempted by Statute. Section 1344(f)(1)(C), which exempts discharge of dredged material "for the purpose of... the maintenance of drainage ditches." All of these exemptions were envisioned to be self-executing, that is not technically requiring an administrative no-jurisdiction determination. One such example was the maintenance of agricultural drainage ditches. Throughout the hearing process, Congressmen of every environmental persuasion repeatedly stated that the over $5 Billion invested in drainage facilities could be maintained without government regulation of any kind. Senator Edmund Muskie, for example, explained that exempt activities such as agricultural drainage would be entirely unregulated. Other exemptions were granted as well, including exemptions for normal farming activities. These exemptions have, however, been interpreted narrowly.

===== Importance of no-jurisdiction determinations =====
Although Congress envisioned a set of self-executing exemptions, it has become common for landowners to seek no-jurisdiction determinations from the USACE. A landowner who intends to make substantial investments in acquisition or improvement of land might lawfully proceed with exempt activity, a permit not being required. The problem is that if the landowner's assumptions are incorrect and the activity is later determined not to be exempt, the USACE will issue a cease-and-desist order. Obtaining an advanced ruling provides some level of comfort that the activities will have been deemed conducted in good faith. Further, as the Supreme Court observed in Army Corps of Engineers v. Hawkes Co., a no-jurisdiction determination "binds the two agencies authorized to bring civil enforcement proceedings under the Clean Water Act, see 33 U.S.C. § 1319, creating a five-year safe harbor from such proceedings for property owner."

===== Recapture of exemptions =====
Because some of the six exemptions involved new activities, such as minor drainage and silviculture (the clearing of forests by the timber industry), Congress recognized the need to impose some limitations on exemptions. Consequently, Congress placed the so-called recapture clause limitation on these new project exemptions. Under section 404(f)(2), such new projects would be deprived of their exemption if all of the following three characteristics could be shown:

1. A discharge of dredge or fill material in the navigable waters of the United States;
2. The discharge is incidental to an activity having as its purpose the bringing of an area of navigable waters into a use to which it was not previously subject, and
3. Where the flow or circulation of navigable waters may be impaired or the reach of such waters may be reduced.

To remove the exemption, all of these requirements must be fulfilled—the discharge, the project purpose of bringing an area into a use to which it was not previously subject, and the impairment or reduction of navigable waters.

==== POTW Biosolids Management Program ====
The 1987 WQA created a program for management of biosolids (sludge) generated by POTWs. The Act instructed EPA to develop guidelines for usage and disposal of sewage sludge or biosolids. The EPA regulations: (1) Identify uses for sewage sludge, including disposal; (2) Specify factors to be taken into account in determining the measures and practices applicable to each such use or disposal (including publication of information on costs); and (3) Identify concentrations of pollutants which interfere with each such use or disposal. EPA created an Intra-Agency Sludge Task Force to aid in developing comprehensive sludge regulations that are designed to do the following: (1) Conduct a multimedia examination of sewage sludge management, focusing on sewage sludge generated by POTWs; and (2) develop a cohesive Agency policy on sewage sludge management, designed to guide the Agency in implementing sewage sludge regulatory and management programs.

The term biosolids is used to differentiate treated sewage sludge that can be beneficially recycled. Environmental advantages of sewage sludge consist of, application of sludge to land due to its soil condition properties and nutrient content. Advantages also extend to reduction in adverse health effects of incineration, decreased chemical fertilizer dependency, diminishing greenhouse gas emissions deriving from incineration and reduction in incineration fuel and energy costs. Beneficial reuse of sewage sludge is supported in EPA policies: the 1984 Beneficial Reuse Policy and the 1991 Inter-agency Policy on Beneficial Use of Sewage Sludge, with an objective to reduce volumes of waste generated. Sewage sludge contains nutrients such as nitrogen and phosphorus but also contains significant numbers of pathogens such as bacteria, viruses, protozoa and eggs of parasitic worms. Sludge also contains more than trace amounts of organic and inorganic chemicals. Benefits of reusing sewage sludge from use of organic and nutrient content in biosolids is valuable source in improving marginal lands and serving as supplements to fertilizers and soil conditioners. Extension of benefits of sludge on agriculture commodities include increase forest productivity, accelerated tree growth, re-vegetation of forest land previously devastated by natural disasters or construction activities. Also, sewage sludge use to aid growth of final vegetative cap for municipal solid waste landfills is enormously beneficial. Opposing benefits of sludge water result from high levels of pathogenic organisms that can possibly contaminate soil, water, crops, livestock, and fish. Pathogens, metals, organic chemical content and odors are cause of major health, environmental and aesthetic factors. Sludge treatment processes reduce the level of pathogens which becomes important when applying sludge to land as well as distributing and marketing it. Pollutants of sewage sludge come from domestic wastewater, discharge of industrial wastewater, municipal sewers and also from runoffs from parking lots, lawns and fields that were applied fertilizers, pesticides and insecticides.

The quality of sewage sludge is controlled under section 405(d), where limitations are set with methods of use or disposal for pollutants in sludge. EPA, under section 405(d)(3), established a containment approach to limit pollutants instead of numerical limitations. This methodology is more reasonable than numerical limitations and includes design standards, equipment standards, management practice, and operational standards or combination of these. Limits on sewage sludge quality allows treatment works that generate less contaminated pollutants and those that do not meet the sludge quality standards for use and disposal practice must clean up influent, improve sewage sludge treatment and/or select another use of disposal method. EPA has set standards for appropriate practices of use and disposal of biosolids in order to protect public health and the environment, but choice of use or disposal practices are reserved to local communities. Listed under section 405(e) of CWA, local communities are encouraged to use their sewage sludge for its beneficial properties instead of disposing it.

Standards are set for sewage sludge generated or treated by publicly owned and privately owned treatment works that treat domestic sewage and municipal wastewater. Materials flushed in household drains through sinks, toilets and tubs are referred to as domestic wastewater and include components of soaps, shampoos, human excrement, tissues, food particles, pesticides, hazardous waste, oil and grease. These domestic wastewaters are treated at the source in septic tanks, cesspools, portable toilets, or in publicly/privately owned wastewater treatment works. Alternately, municipal wastewater treatments consist of more levels of treatment that provide greater wastewater cleanup with larger amounts of sewage sludge. Primary municipal treatment remove solids that settle at the bottom, generating more than 3,000 liters of sludge per million liters of wastewater that is treated. Primary sludge water content is easily reduced by thickening or removing water and contains up to 7% solids. Secondary municipal treatment process produces sewage sludge that is generated by biological treatment processes that include activated sludge systems, trickling filters, and other attached growth systems. Microbes are used to break down and convert organic substances in wastewater to microbial residue in biological treatment processes. This process removes up to 90% of organic matter and produces sludge that contains up to 2% solids and has increased generated volumes of sludge. Methods of use and disposal of sewage sludge include the following: Application of sludge to agricultural and non-agricultural lands; sale or give-away of sludge for use in home gardens; disposal of sludge in municipal landfills, sludge-only landfills, surface disposal sites and incineration of sludge. Managing quality of sewage sludge not only involves wastewater reduction and separation of contaminated waste from non-contaminants but also pretreatment of non-domestic wastewater. If pretreatment does not sufficiently reduce pollutant levels, communities have to dispose rather than use sludge.

=== Title V - General Provisions ===
==== Citizen suits ====
Any U.S. citizen may file a citizen suit against any person who has allegedly violated an effluent standard or limitation (i.e., a provision in an NPDES permit) or against the EPA Administrator if the Administrator failed to perform any non-discretionary act or duty required by the CWA. Citizens may commence citizen suits after giving a 60-day prior notice of the alleged violations to the alleged violator.

==== Employee protection ====
The CWA includes an employee ("whistleblower") protection provision. Employees in the U.S. who believe they were fired or suffered adverse action related to enforcement of the CWA may file a written complaint with the Occupational Safety and Health Administration.

=== Title VI - State Water Pollution Control Revolving Funds ===
The Clean Water State Revolving Fund (CWSRF) program was authorized by the 1987 WQA. This replaced the municipal construction grants program, which was authorized in the 1972 law under Title II. In the CWSRF, federal funds are provided to the states and Puerto Rico to capitalize their respective revolving funds, which are used to provide financial assistance (loans or grants) to local governments for wastewater treatment, nonpoint source pollution control and estuary protection.

The fund provides loans to municipalities at lower-than-market rates. The program's average interest rate was 1.4 percent nationwide in 2017, compared to an average market rate of 3.5 percent. In 2017, CWSRF assistance totaling $7.4 billion was provided to 1,484 local projects across the country.

== Recent developments ==
=== Waters of the United States definition ===
The CWA's geographic reach (the meaning of the term "navigable waters" or "waters of the United States") has been a source of significant controversy. During the period between the Supreme Court's 2006 fractured decision in Rapanos v. United States, and the Supreme Court's 2023 decision in Sackett v. EPA, multiple unsuccessful attempts at defining "waters of the United States" were made.

After Rapanos, EPA and the Corps issued a guidance document explaining how federal Clean Water Act jurisdiction was to be established. This guidance took some aspects from the Rapanos plurality test and some from Justice Kennedy's significant nexus test. The guidance was widely viewed as ineffective. Recognizing that failure, the presidential administration of Barack Obama issued the Clean Water Rule on June 29, 2015. The Clean Water Rule used the significant nexus test as a starting point to take "a muscular approach that would subject 'the vast majority of the nation's water features' to a case-by-case jurisdictional analysis." The 2015 Clean Water Rule was blocked by the courts within months of its adoption.

The Trump administration then tried rulemaking again, issuing in April 2020 the Navigable Waters Protection Rule. That rule relied primarily on Justice Scalia's test from Rapanos, while also borrowing elements of Justice Kennedy's significant nexus test. This effort at construing Rapanos was also blocked by the courts.

Under the administration of President Joe Biden, USACE and EPA published a revised definition of WOTUS on January 18, 2023, restoring the pre-2015 regulations on the scope of federal jurisdiction over waterways, effective March 20, 2023. This definition asserted authority primarily under Justice Kennedy's "significant nexus" test. The 2023 Rule was blocked by several courts within weeks of its adoption. And on May 25, 2023, this restored WOTUS regulation would again be effectively eliminated after the Supreme Court ruled in the second Sackett v. Environmental Protection Agency case that the Clean Water Act's regulatory authority of waters in the United States was limited to wetlands and waters "with a continuous surface connection" to larger bodies of water, returning to Justice Scalia's definition as outlined in his Rapanos v. United States opinion. Under this decision, the EPA is no longer permitted to regulate water which has been isolated from these larger bodies of water. Some estimates suggest this decision removed EPA control from as much as half of its previously regulated waters. By directly addressing the meaning of "waters of the United States," the Supreme Court in Sackett v. Environmental Protection Agency resolved the decades-long controversy over the CWA's scope.

== Earlier legislation ==
During the 1880s and 1890s, Congress directed USACE to prevent dumping and filling in the nation's harbors, and the program was vigorously enforced. Congress first addressed water pollution issues in the Rivers and Harbors Act of 1899, giving the Corps the authority to regulate most kinds of obstructions to navigation, including hazards resulting from effluents. Portions of this law remain in effect, including Section 13, the so-called Refuse Act. In 1910, USACE used the act to object to a proposed sewer in New York City, but a court ruled that pollution control was a matter left to the states alone. Speaking to the 1911 National Rivers and Harbors Congress, the chief of the Corps, William H. Bixby, suggested that modern treatment facilities and prohibitions on dumping "should either be made compulsory or at least encouraged everywhere in the United States." Most legal analysts have concluded that the 1899 law did not address environmental impacts from pollution, such as sewage or industrial discharges. However, there were several pollution enforcement cases in the 1960s and 1970s where the law was cited for broader pollution control objectives.

Some sections of the 1899 act have been superseded by various amendments, including the 1972 CWA, while other notable legislative predecessors include:

- Public Health Service Act of 1912 expanded the mission of the United States Public Health Service to study problems of sanitation, sewage and pollution.
- Oil Pollution Act of 1924 prohibited the intentional discharge of fuel oil into tidal waters and provided authorization for USACE to apprehend violators. This was repealed by the 1972 CWA, reducing the Corps' role in pollution control to the discharge of dredged or fill material.
- Federal Water Pollution Control Act of 1948 created a comprehensive set of water quality programs that also provided some financing for state and local governments. Enforcement was limited to interstate waters. The Public Health Service provided financial and technical assistance.
- Water Quality Act of 1965 required states to issue water quality standards for interstate waters, and authorized the newly created Federal Water Pollution Control Administration to set standards where states failed to do so.

When EPA first opened its doors in 1970, the agency had weak authority to protect U.S. waters, lacking the legal power to write effluent guidelines and possessing only general authority to require secondary treatment from industrial dischargers.

The 1969 burning of the Cuyahoga River had sparked national outrage; the Act grew out of it. In December 1970 a federal grand jury investigation led by Ohio lawyer Robert Jones began, of water pollution allegedly being caused by about 12 companies in northeastern Ohio. It was the first grand jury investigation of water pollution in the area. The Attorney General of the United States, John N. Mitchell, gave a Press Conference December 18, 1970 referencing new pollution control litigation, with particular reference to work with the new Environmental Protection Agency, and announcing the filing of a lawsuit that morning against the Jones and Laughlin Steel Corporation for discharging substantial quantities of cyanide into the Cuyahoga River near Cleveland. It was largely based on these and other litigation experiences that criteria for new legislation were identified. Some scholars, however, dispute the relationship between the Cuyahoga River fire, and the impetus for the Clean Water Act.

== Case law ==
- United States v. Riverside Bayview Homes, Inc. 474 U.S. 121 (1985). The Supreme Court upheld the Act's coverage in regulating wetlands that intermingle with navigable waters. This ruling was revised by the 2006 Rapanos decision and the 2023 Sackett decision.
- Edward Hanousek, Jr v. United States (9th Cir. Court of Appeals, 1996; certiorari denied, 2000). In 1994, during rock removal operations, a backhoe operator accidentally struck a petroleum pipeline near the railroad tracks. The operator's mistake caused the pipeline to rupture and spill between 1,000 and 5,000 gallons of heating oil into the Skagway river. Despite not being present at the scene during operations White Pass and Yukon Route Roadmaster Edward Hanousek, Jr. and President Paul Taylor were both held responsible for the spill and convicted.
- Solid Waste Agency of North Cook County (SWANCC) v. United States Army Corps of Engineers 531 U.S. 159 (2001), denying the CWA's hold in isolated intrastate waters and denying the validity of the 1986 "Migratory Bird Rule."
- S. D. Warren Co. v. Maine Bd. of Env. Protection 547 U.S. 370 (2006). The Court ruled that section 401 state certification requirements apply to hydroelectric dams, which are federally licensed, where the dams cause a discharge into navigable waters.
- Rapanos v. United States 547 U.S. 715 (2006). The Supreme Court questioned federal jurisdiction as it attempted to define the Act's use of the terms "navigable waters" and "waters of the United States." The Court rejected the position of the USACE that its authority over water was essentially limitless. Though the case resulted in no binding case law adopting a definitive standard for federal authority, the Court rejected the government's hydrological connection test, whereby federal jurisdiction would apply to any wetland or water from which water could flow ultimately to a traditional navigable-in-fact water body.
- Northwest Environmental Advocates et al. v. EPA (9th Cir. Court of Appeals, 2008). Vessel discharges are subject to NPDES permit requirements. See Ballast water regulation in the United States.
- Sackett v. Environmental Protection Agency, 566 U.S. 120 (2012). The Supreme Court held that an EPA compliance order issued under Section 309(a) of the CWA is "final agency action" subject to judicial review under the Administrative Procedure Act.
- National Cotton Council v. EPA (6th Cir. Court of Appeals, 2009). Point source discharges of biological pesticides, and chemical pesticides that leave a residue, into waters of the U.S. are subject to NPDES permit requirements.
- Army Corps of Engineers v. Hawkes Co. 578 U.S. __ (2016), 8-0 ruling that a jurisdictional determination by the Army Corps of Engineers that land contains "waters of the United States" is a "final agency action", which is reviewable by the courts. This allows landowners to sue in court if the Army Corps of Engineers determines that the land contains waters of the United States (and therefore falls under the Clean Water Act).
- County of Maui v. Hawaii Wildlife Fund 590 U.S. __ (2020), a 6–3 ruling that a NPDES permit is required for point sources (as established in the statute) or for non-point sources that are "functionally equivalent" to direct discharge, such as in the specific case, wastewater discharged into injection wells that eventually reach the ocean, a navigable waterway.
- Sackett v. Environmental Protection Agency 598 U.S. __ (2023), the Supreme Court unanimously rejected the government's "significant nexus" test for establishing federal jurisdiction under the CWA. A five-justice majority also held that the Act at most regulates "relatively permanent waters" and those wetlands that maintain continuous surface connection to such waters so that there is no clear demarcation between those wetlands and waters.

== Effects ==
To date, the water quality goals stated by Congress in the 1972 act have not been achieved by American society:

- "to make all U.S. waters fishable and swimmable by 1983;"
- "to have zero water pollution discharge by 1985;"
- "to prohibit discharge of toxic amounts of toxic pollutants".

More than half of U.S. stream and river miles, about 70 percent of lakes, ponds and reservoirs, and 90 percent of the surveyed ocean and near coastal areas continue to violate water quality standards. The reasons for the impairment vary by location; major sources are agriculture, industry and communities (typically through urban runoff). Some of these pollution sources are difficult to control through national regulatory programs.

However, since the passage of the 1972 act, the levels of pollution in the United States have experienced a dramatic decrease. The law has resulted in much cleaner waterways than before the bill was passed. Agriculture, industry, communities and other sources continue to discharge waste into surface waters nationwide, and many of these waters are drinking water sources. In many watersheds nutrient pollution (excess nitrogen and phosphorus) has become a major problem. It is argued in a 2008 article that the Clean Water Act has made extremely positive contributions to the environment, but is in desperate need of reform to address the pollution problems that remain. A 2015 article acknowledges that the CWA has been effective in controlling point sources, but that it has not been effective with nonpoint sources, and argues that the law must be updated to address the nation's current water quality problems.

A 2017 working article finds that "most types of water pollution declined over the period 1962-2001, though the rate of decrease slowed over time... Our finding of decreases in most pollutants implies that the prevalence of such violations was even greater before the Clean Water Act." Several studies have estimated that the costs of the CWA (including the expenditures for the Title II construction grants program) are higher than the benefits. An EPA study had similar findings, but acknowledged that several kinds of benefits were unmeasured. A 2018 study argues that "available estimates of the costs and benefits of water pollution control programs [including the CWA] are incomplete and do not conclusively determine the net benefits of surface water quality."

== Criticism ==
According to an article published by the National Bureau of Economic Research, the Clean Water Act has been one of the most controversial regulations in the history of the United States. The article suggests that it remains uncertain whether the Clean Water Act has been efficacious, or if there has been any discernible reduction in water pollution. An analysis conducted in the 1990s provided a summary of these uncertainties, “As we approached the twenty-year anniversary of [The Clean Water Act], no comprehensive analysis was available to answer basic questions: How much cleaner are our rivers than they were two decades ago?”

Council of Economic Advisers chair Paul McCracken described the Clean Water Act as an “...inefficient use of national resources that would not produce balancing [of] social and economic benefits”.

According to the Pacific Legal Foundation (PLF), a public interest law firm, the years of broad and ambiguous definitions of "navigable waters" from EPA and the USACE have led to government overreach, regulatory whiplash, and numerous abuses of authority. These concerns were echoed by the Supreme Court when it unanimously rejected EPA and the USACE's use of the "significant nexus test" in the second Sackett decision.

== See also ==
- America's Water Infrastructure Act of 2018
- Coastal Zone Management Act
- Great Lakes Areas of Concern
- Ocean Dumping Act
- Oil Pollution Act of 1990
- Safe Drinking Water Act
- Water supply and sanitation in the United States
- Mitigation banking
