= Rapanos v. United States =

- Supreme Court of the United States

Argued February 21, 2006 Decided June 19, 2006
- Full case name: John A. Rapanos, et ux., et al., Petitioners v. United States; June Carabell, et al., Petitioners v. United States Army Corps of Engineers, et al.
- Docket no.: 04-1034
- Citations: 547 U.S. 715 (more) 126 S. Ct. 2208; 165 L. Ed. 2d 159; 2006 U.S. LEXIS 4887; 74 U.S.L.W. 4365; 62 ERC (BNA) 1481; 19 Fla. L. Weekly Fed. S 275

Case history
- Prior: United States v. Rapanos, 895 F. Supp. 165 (E.D. Mich. 1995); reversed and remanded, 115 F.3d 367 (6th Cir. 1997); conviction affirmed, remanded for resentencing, 235 F.3d 256 (6th Cir. 2000); vacated, Rapanos v. United States, 533 U.S. 913 (2001); remanded, United States v. Rapanos, 16 F. App'x 345 (6th Cir. 2001); conviction set aside, 190 F. Supp. 2d 1011 (E.D. Mich. 2002); reversed, United States v. Rapanos, 339 F.3d 447 (6th Cir. 2003); conviction affirmed, 376 F.3d 629 (6th Cir. 2004); cert. granted, 546 U.S. 932 (2005). Carabell v. U.S. Army Corps of Engineers, 257 F. Supp. 2d 917 (E.D. Mich. 2003), affirmed, 391 F.3d 704 (6th Cir. 2004); cert. granted, 546 U.S. 932 (2005).

Holding
- Wetlands without a hydrological or ecological connection to other navigable waters do not fall within the jurisdiction of the Clean Water Act.

Court membership
- Chief Justice John Roberts Associate Justices John P. Stevens · Antonin Scalia; Anthony Kennedy · David Souter; Clarence Thomas · Ruth Bader Ginsburg; Stephen Breyer · Samuel Alito

Case opinions
- Plurality: Scalia, joined by Roberts, Thomas, Alito
- Concurrence: Roberts
- Concurrence: Kennedy (in judgment)
- Dissent: Stevens, joined by Souter, Ginsburg, Breyer
- Dissent: Breyer

Laws applied
- Clean Water Act

Rapanos v. United States, 547 U.S. 715 (2006), was a United States Supreme Court case challenging federal jurisdiction to regulate isolated wetlands under the Clean Water Act. It was the first major environmental case heard by the newly appointed Chief Justice, John Roberts, and Associate Justice Samuel Alito. The Supreme Court heard the case on February 21, 2006, and issued a decision on June 19, 2006.

While five justices agreed to void rulings against the defendants, who were prosecuted for impacting a wetland incidental to commercial development, the court was split over further details, with the four more conservative justices arguing in a plurality opinion for a more restrictive reading of the term "navigable waters" than the four more liberal justices. Justice Anthony Kennedy did not fully join either position. The case was remanded to the lower court.

Ultimately, Rapanos agreed to a nearly $1,000,000 settlement with the EPA without admitting any wrongdoing.

== Background ==
The case involves developers John A. Rapanos (Midland, Michigan) and June Carabell, whose separate projects were stopped because of the environmental regulations that make up the Clean Water Act.

In the late 1980s, Rapanos prepared 22 acres (8.9 ha) of land for the development of a mall by pulling trees and filling the hole with sand. Rapanos did not file for a permit when he pulled the trees, but the government claimed that his land was a wetland because it was adjacent to a drainage ditch. Rapanos argued that the land was not a wetland and that he was not breaking the law. He claimed that his land was up to 20 miles (32 km) from any navigable waterways. But the United States Environmental Protection Agency has interpreted the term "navigable waterway" broadly, to include areas connected to or linked to waters via tributaries or other similar means.

When Rapanos refused to accept the government's claims about whether his land was a wetland, the government filed a federal lawsuit against him, accusing him of violating the Clean Water Act. After a mistrial, the jury returned two felony guilty verdicts for filling wetlands in Rapanos's second trial. In August 1995, U.S. District Judge Lawrence Paul Zatkoff granted Rapanos's request for a new trial, but in May 1997, Sixth Circuit Judge Pierce Lively, joined by Judge Karen Nelson Moore, reversed and remanded for sentencing, over the dissent of Judge David Aldrich Nelson. After sentencing, Circuit Chief Judge Boyce F. Martin Jr., joined by Judges Alan Eugene Norris and Karl Spillman Forester, remanded for resentencing in December 2000. In February 2002, Judge Zatkoff set aside Rapanos's conviction again, and in September 2003 Circuit Judge Martin, joined by Judges Norris and John M. Rogers, again reinstated the conviction. In the end, Rapanos was forced to serve three years of probation and pay $5,000 in fines.

In July 2004, Judge Danny C. Reeves, joined by Circuit Judges Eugene Edward Siler Jr. and Julia Smith Gibbons, affirmed the district court's civil judgment against Rapanos. Next, with representation from the nonprofit public interest law firm Pacific Legal Foundation, Rapanos unsuccessfully sought a rehearing from the Sixth Circuit. Failing that, he appealed the civil case against him, which included millions of dollars of fines, to the Supreme Court.

Carabell, who was involved in the associated case Carabell v. United States Army Corps of Engineers, sought a permit to build condominiums on 19 acres (77,000 m^{2}) of wetlands, but his request was denied by the Army Corps of Engineers. Carabell took the issue to the courts by arguing that the federal government did not have jurisdiction. In September 2004, Judge William Stafford, joined by Circuit Judges Gibbons and Alice M. Batchelder, affirmed the district court's delivery of summary judgment against Carabell. Carabell then appealed to the Supreme Court.

In United States v. Riverside Bayview, the unanimous Court had found that wetlands abutting Lake St. Clair were included in the Corps's jurisdiction over waters of the United States. In 2001, a divided Court found that the migratory bird rule could not reach isolated ponds in Solid Waste Agency of Northern Cook County v. Army Corps of Engineers (SWANCC). All waters with a "significant nexus" to "navigable waters" are covered under the CWA, but the words "significant nexus" remain open to judicial interpretation and considerable controversy. Some regulations included water features such as intermittent streams, playa lakes, prairie potholes, sloughs and wetlands as "waters of the United States".

The case was argued on the same day as S. D. Warren Co. v. Maine Board of Environmental Protection, with the Pacific Legal Foundation arguing for Rapanos and United States Solicitor General Paul Clement arguing for the government.

== Decision ==
The justices were unable to produce a majority decision.

Four justices voted to affirm. Four justices voted to vacate, to strike down the Corps's interpretation of the CWA, and to remand under a new "continuous surface water connection" standard. Justice Kennedy also voted to vacate and remand but under the different, "significant nexus", standard. The Court voted 4-1-4, with three justices making oral readings at the opinion announcement, and five printed opinions spanning over 100 pages. Both cases were remanded "for further proceedings".

=== Justice Scalia's plurality opinion ===
Justice Antonin Scalia authored a plurality opinion, joined by Chief Justice John Roberts, Justice Clarence Thomas, and Justice Samuel Alito. Scalia began his analysis by arguing that the Corps "exercises the discretion of an enlightened despot" and quoted factors it used when choosing to exercise jurisdiction, such as "aesthetics" and "in general, the needs and welfare of the people". He then criticized the cost associated with exercising jurisdiction, noting that the average applicant spends 788 days and $271,596 on an application and that "for backfilling his own wet fields", Rapanos faced 63 months in prison. Scalia argued the "immense expansion of federal regulation" over "swampy lands" would give the Corps jurisdiction over "half of Alaska and an area the size of California in the lower 48 States."

Scalia detailed the Clean Water Act's history, from the litigation forcing the Corps to broaden its jurisdiction beyond traditional navigable waters to its adoption of the Migratory Bird Rule after Riverside Bayview to SWANCC's rejection of that rule and calls for new regulations. He then noted that the Corps has still not amended its published regulations, and emphasized a Government Accountability Office investigation finding disparate standards across different Corps district offices. Scalia ultimately concluded that Waters of the United States should include only relatively permanent, standing or continuously flowing bodies of water because, according to him, that was the definition of "the waters" in Webster's Dictionary. He also rejected Justice Kennedy's assertion that the same dictionary definition lists floods as an alternative usage, on the grounds that it is "strange to suppose that Congress had waxed Shakespearean." Therefore, he suggested, the Corps's regulations of intermittent streams were "useful oxymora".

According to the plurality opinion, the Clean Water Act confers federal jurisdiction over non-navigable waters only if the waters exhibit a relatively permanent flow, such as a river, lake, or stream. In addition, a wetland falls within the Corps's jurisdiction only if there is a continuous surface water connection between it and a relatively permanent waterbody, and it is difficult to determine where the waterbody ends and the wetland begins. In addition to his textualist arguments, Scalia also argued that his conclusions conformed with basic principles of federalism. Quoting the CWA's policy to "protect the primary responsibilities and rights of the States", he argued that the Corps's inferred jurisdiction failed the clear statement rule. Furthermore, because its interpretation "stretches the outer limits of Congress's commerce power", Scalia justified his selective interpretation under constitutional avoidance. The rest of his opinion attacks the other justices' arguments. Justice John Paul Stevens wrote that the plurality opinion upset three decades of administrative and congressional practice, but Scalia rejected that argument as "a curious appeal to entrenched Executive error" and also characterized Kennedy's significant nexus test as a "gimmick" to devise "his new statute all on his own" and his reasoning as "turtles all the way down".

=== Chief Justice Roberts's concurring opinion ===
Chief Justice Roberts wrote separately to note that it was "unfortunate" that the Court failed to reach a majority. He also criticized the Corps for refusing to publish guidance on the scope of its power, even after being warned to do so in SWANCC.

=== Justice Kennedy's concurring opinion ===
Justice Kennedy wrote an opinion concurring with the judgment of the court. (Note: In plurality opinions, a majority of Justices agree upon the proper disposition of the case, but "no single rationale explaining the result enjoys the assent of five justices." When analyzing a plurality opinion, "the holding of the Court may be viewed as that position taken by those Members who concurred in the judgments on the narrowest grounds....") But while he agreed that the cases should be vacated and remanded, he believed that a wetland or non-navigable waterbody falls within the scope of the Clean Water Act's jurisdiction if it bears a "significant nexus" to a traditional navigable waterway. Using some of the Court's language in SWANCC, Kennedy argued the CWA defines navigable waters as a water or wetland that possesses a significant nexus to waters that are navigable in fact. He argued that a nexus exists where the wetland or waterbody, either by itself or in combination with other similar sites, significantly affects the physical, biological, and chemical integrity of the downstream navigable waterway.

Kennedy spent the rest of his concurring opinion explaining why the eight other justices were wrong. He called Scalia's opinion "inconsistent with the Act's text, structure, and purpose" and wrote that what Scalia called "wet fields" were in fact sensitive habitats that provide essential ecosystem services. He also criticized Scalia's selective reliance on only part of the dictionary definition of "waters". Kennedy noted that even the Los Angeles River might fail Scalia's test. Kennedy also attacked, "as an empirical matter", Scalia's assertion that silt cannot wash downstream. Likewise, Kennedy criticized Stevens's dissenting opinion, writing, "while the plurality reads nonexistent requirements into the Act, the dissent reads a central requirement out." Referring to the inconsistencies found by the GAO investigation, Kennedy wrote that he could not share Stevens's trust in the Corps's reasonableness.

=== Justice Stevens's dissenting opinion ===
Justice Stevens wrote a dissenting opinion, joined by Justice David Souter, Justice Ruth Bader Ginsburg, and Justice Stephen Breyer. Stevens called the Corps's asserted jurisdiction "a quintessential example of the Executive's reasonable interpretation" and argued that Riverside Bayview already "squarely controls" the validity of the regulations. After reviewing in detail the criminal allegations against Rapanos, Stevens emphasized that the SWANCC Court limited Corps jurisdiction over only truly isolated waters, and Congress deliberately acquiesced to Corps regulation when it appropriated funds for the National Wetlands Inventory. Stevens also criticized Scalia's "dramatic departure" from Riverside Bayview in a "creative opinion" that "is utterly unpersuasive". He derided Scalia's new limit on jurisdiction to relatively permanent bodies of water as an "arbitrary distinction". Additionally, Stevens criticized Scalia for "cit[ing] a dictionary for a proposition it does not contain." Rather, Stevens argued that "common sense and common usage" treat intermittent streams as streams. Stevens concluded that "the very existence of words like 'alluvium' and 'silt' in our language" disprove Scalia's assertion that material does not normally wash downstream.

Stevens noted that he agreed with Kennedy's description of the cases and Kennedy's critique of Scalia's opinion. But Stevens wrote that he was "skeptical" that there actually were any adjacent wetlands that would not meet Kennedy's significant nexus test. Nevertheless, Stevens clarified that because all four dissenters adopted the broadest jurisdictional test, they would also find Corps jurisdiction in any case that meets either Scalia's or Kennedy's test. Stevens therefore assumed Kennedy's "approach will be controlling in most cases".

=== Justice Breyer's dissenting opinion ===
Justice Breyer wrote separately to note that he believed that Corps CWA authority extended to the very limits of the interstate commerce power. Because he believed that agency expertise would produce better definitions than judicial review, he called on the Corps to write new regulations "speedily."

== Subsequent developments ==
Because no single opinion garnered a majority of the votes, there was some confusion about the controlling test for wetlands jurisdiction in the aftermath of this case. Roberts observed that the lower courts would likely look to Marks v. United States to guide them in applying the competing Rapanos standards. Marks provides, "When a fragmented Court decides a case and no single rationale explaining the result enjoys the assent of five Justices, the holding of the Court may be viewed as that position taken by those Members who concurred in the judgments on the narrowest grounds." Stevens, writing the principal Rapanos dissent, suggested that lower courts could use either the plurality's or Kennedy's test, as both would command the support of at least five justices.

Between 2006 and 2023, seven federal appellate courts had considered the question of which Rapanos test was controlling. The Fifth Circuit in United States v. Lucas and the Sixth Circuit in United States v. Cundiff avoided the question, as they determined that the evidence presented was adequate to support federal jurisdiction under either standard. The Seventh Circuit in United States v. Gerke Excavating, Inc., the Ninth Circuit in Northern California River Watch v. City of Healdsburg, and the Eleventh Circuit in United States v. Robison held that Kennedy's opinion (the "significant nexus" test) is controlling. The First Circuit in United States v. Johnson and the Eighth Circuit in United States v. Bailey held that jurisdiction may be established under either Rapanos test. The United States District Court for the Northern District of Texas court held that the Rapanos plurality opinion (the "continuous surface water connection" test) was controlling.

As Roberts anticipated, the courts adopting Kennedy's standard between Rapanos and the later case Sackett v. EPA did so by invoking Marks; under Marks, a split decision's binding legal rule is found in the opinion taken by the concurring justices on the narrowest grounds, which has been interpreted as meaning the opinion that is the "logical subset" of the other opinions in the case. As applied to Rapanos, Marks dictates that if either the plurality or the Kennedy test is a subset of the other, that test is controlling. The appellate courts that have followed the Kennedy test have concluded that it is a logical subset of the Rapanos plurality test and therefore controlling. The appellate courts that have adopted both Rapanos tests (the First and Eighth Circuits) have concluded that Marks does not apply to Rapanos and that both tests are equally valid. The Supreme Court has denied petitions for writ of certiorari in six of the seven circuit court cases addressing the Rapanos split-decision question. (The Bailey appellant did not file a petition.)

On October 3, 2022, the court held oral arguments in Sacket v. EPA, and on May 25, 2023, Justice Alito announced an opinion adopting the Rapanos plurality's "continuous surface water connection" test. Justice Brett Kavanaugh filed a concurrence in the judgment joined by Justices Sonia Sotomayor, Elena Kagan, and Ketanji Brown Jackson. Kavanaugh agreed with the majority's adoption of the Rapanos plurality's characterization of "waters of the United States", but argued that the Clean Water Act covered wetlands adjacent to the "waters of the United States".

=== WOTUS rule ===
Citing the confusion created by Rapanos, on June 29, 2015, the Corps and EPA promulgated a new 75-page regulation attempting to clarify the scope of waters of the United States, to take effect on August 28. Thirteen states sued, and on August 27, U.S. Chief District Judge Ralph R. Erickson issued an injunction blocking the regulation in those states. In separate litigation, on October 9, a divided federal appeals court stayed the rule's application nationwide.

== See also ==
- Solid Waste Agency of Northern Cook Cty. v. Army Corps of Engineers
- County of Maui v. Hawaii Wildlife Fund
- List of United States Supreme Court cases, volume 547
