= Sackett v. Environmental Protection Agency (2012) =

- Supreme Court of the United States

Argued January 9, 2012 Decided March 21, 2012
- Full case name: Chantell Sackett, et vir v. Environmental Protection Agency, et al.
- Docket no.: 10-1062
- Citations: 566 U.S. 120 (more) 132 S. Ct. 1367; 182 L. Ed. 2d 367; 2012 U.S. LEXIS 2320
- Argument: Oral argument

Case history
- Prior: Case dismissed, 2008 WL 3286801 (D. Idaho Aug. 7, 2008); affirmed, 622 F.3d 1139 (9th Cir. 2010); cert. granted, 564 U.S. 1052 (2011).
- Subsequent: Remanded to District court, 677 F.3d 1000 (9th. Cir. 2012)

Holding
- Orders under the Clean Water Act are subject to the Administrative Procedure Act, which requires an appeals process for any ruling by a federal agency.

Court membership
- Chief Justice John Roberts Associate Justices Antonin Scalia · Anthony Kennedy; Clarence Thomas · Ruth Bader Ginsburg; Stephen Breyer · Samuel Alito; Sonia Sotomayor · Elena Kagan

Case opinions
- Majority: Scalia, joined by unanimous
- Concurrence: Ginsburg
- Concurrence: Alito

Laws applied
- U.S. Const. amend. V, Clean Water Act, Administrative Procedure Act

Sackett v. Environmental Protection Agency, 566 U.S. 120 (2012), also known as Sackett I (to distinguish it from the 2023 case), is a United States Supreme Court case in which the Court held that orders issued by the Environmental Protection Agency under the Clean Water Act are subject to the Administrative Procedure Act. The Court ruled that, because the Environmental Protection Agency's orders constitute "final agency action" under the Administrative Procedure Act, federal courts may hear appeals from its orders.

== Background ==
The plaintiffs, Mike and Chantell Sackett, purchased, approximately, a two-thirds acre parcel of land (0.62) near Priest Lake, Idaho, on which they planned to build a house. Shortly after they began clearing the lot, the Sacketts received a Compliance Order from the U.S. Environmental Protection Agency, asserting that the property was subject to the Clean Water Act, and that the Sacketts had illegally placed fill material into jurisdictional wetlands on their property. After trying unsuccessfully to obtain a hearing from the EPA, the Sacketts filed suit demanding an opportunity to contest the jurisdictional basis of the Compliance Order. Both the District Court and the Ninth Circuit Court of Appeals ruled in favor of the government, holding that the validity of the Compliance Order could be challenged only if and when EPA brings an enforcement action seeking to impose civil and criminal penalties against the Sacketts. The Supreme Court granted certiorari, limited to the following questions: "1. May petitioners seek pre-enforcement judicial review of the administrative compliance order pursuant to the Administrative Procedure Act, 5 U. S. C. §704? 2. If not, does petitioners' inability to seek preenforcement judicial review of the administrative compliance order violate their rights under the Due Process clause?" The Sacketts, technically consulted by wetland experts Ray and Susan Kagel of Kagel Environmental, LLC, and represented by Damien M. Schiff of the Pacific Legal Foundation, filed their opening brief on September 23, 2011. Amicus briefs in support of the petitioners were filed by the Center for Constitutional Jurisprudence, the American Farm Bureau Federation, and the National Association of Homebuilders. The opposition brief of the Solicitor General of the United States was filed on November 23, 2011.

== Opinion of the court ==
In a unanimous opinion by Justice Scalia issued on March 21, 2012, the Court held that EPA's compliance orders may be challenged in a civil action brought under the Administrative Procedure Act (APA). The compliance orders are "final agency action" for purposes of the APA, and the Clean Water Act does not preclude judicial review under the APA.

Justices Ginsburg and Alito each filed concurring opinions. Justice Ginsburg stated in her concurrence that the ruling only permitted the Sacketts to challenge EPA's assertion of jurisdiction over their property; the Court did not resolve whether the terms and conditions of the Compliance Order itself were subject to immediate judicial review. Justice Alito recommended that Congress act to clarify issues regarding the reach of the Clean Water Act.

On May 3, 2012, the Court of Appeals for the Ninth Circuit remanded the Sacketts' challenge to the compliance order to the district court, consistent with the Supreme Court's opinion.

== Decision after remand ==
The United States District Court for the District of Idaho ruled against the Sacketts, finding that the area in question was a wetland and had been filled without necessary permits.

== See also ==
- List of United States Supreme Court cases, volume 566
