= County of Maui v. Hawaii Wildlife Fund =

- Supreme Court of the United States

Argued November 6, 2019 Decided April 23, 2020
- Full case name: County of Maui, Hawaii v. Hawaii Wildlife Fund, et al.
- Docket no.: 18-260
- Citations: 590 U.S. 165 (more) 140 S. Ct. 1462; 206 L. Ed. 2d 640
- Argument: Oral argument

Case history
- Prior: Haw. Wildlife Fund v. County of Maui, No. 1:12-cv-00198, 24 F. Supp. 3d 980 (D. Haw. 2014); affirmed, 881 F.3d 754 (9th Cir. 2018); rehearing en banc denied, 886 F.3d 737 (9th Cir. 2018); cert. granted, 139 S.Ct. 1164 (2019).

Holding
- The statutory provisions at issue require a permit when there is a direct discharge from a point source into navigable waters or when there is the functional equivalent of a direct discharge.

Court membership
- Chief Justice John Roberts Associate Justices Clarence Thomas · Ruth Bader Ginsburg; Stephen Breyer · Samuel Alito; Sonia Sotomayor · Elena Kagan; Neil Gorsuch · Brett Kavanaugh

Case opinions
- Majority: Breyer, joined by Roberts, Ginsburg, Sotomayor, Kagan, Kavanaugh
- Concurrence: Kavanaugh
- Dissent: Thomas, joined by Gorsuch
- Dissent: Alito

Laws applied
- Clean Water Act

County of Maui v. Hawaii Wildlife Fund, 590 U.S. 165 (2020), was a United States Supreme Court case involving pollution discharges under the Clean Water Act (CWA). The case asked whether the Clean Water Act requires a permit when pollutants that originate from a non-point source can be traced to reach navigable waters through mechanisms such as groundwater transport. In a 6–3 decision, the Court ruled that such non-point discharges require a permit when they are the "functional equivalent of a direct discharge", a new test defined by the ruling. The decision vacated the ruling of the United States Court of Appeals for the Ninth Circuit, and remanded the case with instructions to apply the new standard to the lower courts with cooperation of the Environmental Protection Agency (EPA).

== Background ==
The Clean Water Act (CWA), enacted in 1972 as the Federal Water Pollution Control Act Amendments of 1972, regulates water pollution into "waters of the United States." One of its provisions involves the regulation of pollutants from point sources (such as the drainage from an industrial plant) into surface waters. Operators of any point source are required to obtain a permit through the National Pollutant Discharge Elimination System (NPDES) that limits what pollutants may be emitted by the point source, necessary treatment steps to take to limit those pollutants, and other considerations.

It is unclear whether the Act covers discharges into waters of the U.S. through groundwater. A plain reading of the statute indicates that it does, "The term "discharge of a pollutant" and the term "discharge of pollutants" each means (A) any addition of any pollutant to navigable waters from any point source, (B) any addition of any pollutant to the waters of the contiguous zone or the ocean from any point source other than a vessel or other floating craft." Whether the CWA covers fairly traceable discharges through groundwater into navigable waters of the U.S. was the fundamental question of the Maui v. Hawaii Wildlife Fund appeal before the United States Supreme Court.

The Safe Drinking Water Act (SDWA) directly regulates discharges into groundwater aquifers, such as through injection wells, and additional regulations set by each state. The EPA still regulates the type of wastewater that can be injected through the Underground Injection Control (UIC) Program, but broadly, the UIC Program allows much higher levels of pollutants to be injected compared to the NPDES, due to the natural filtration action that occurs in groundwater aquifers. Of particular interest to the case are Class V UIC wells—wells used to dispose of non-hazardous water waste into underground aquifers. Typically these will include stormwater drainage or agricultural runoff. The EPA estimates there are 650,000 such Class V wells in place across the United States.

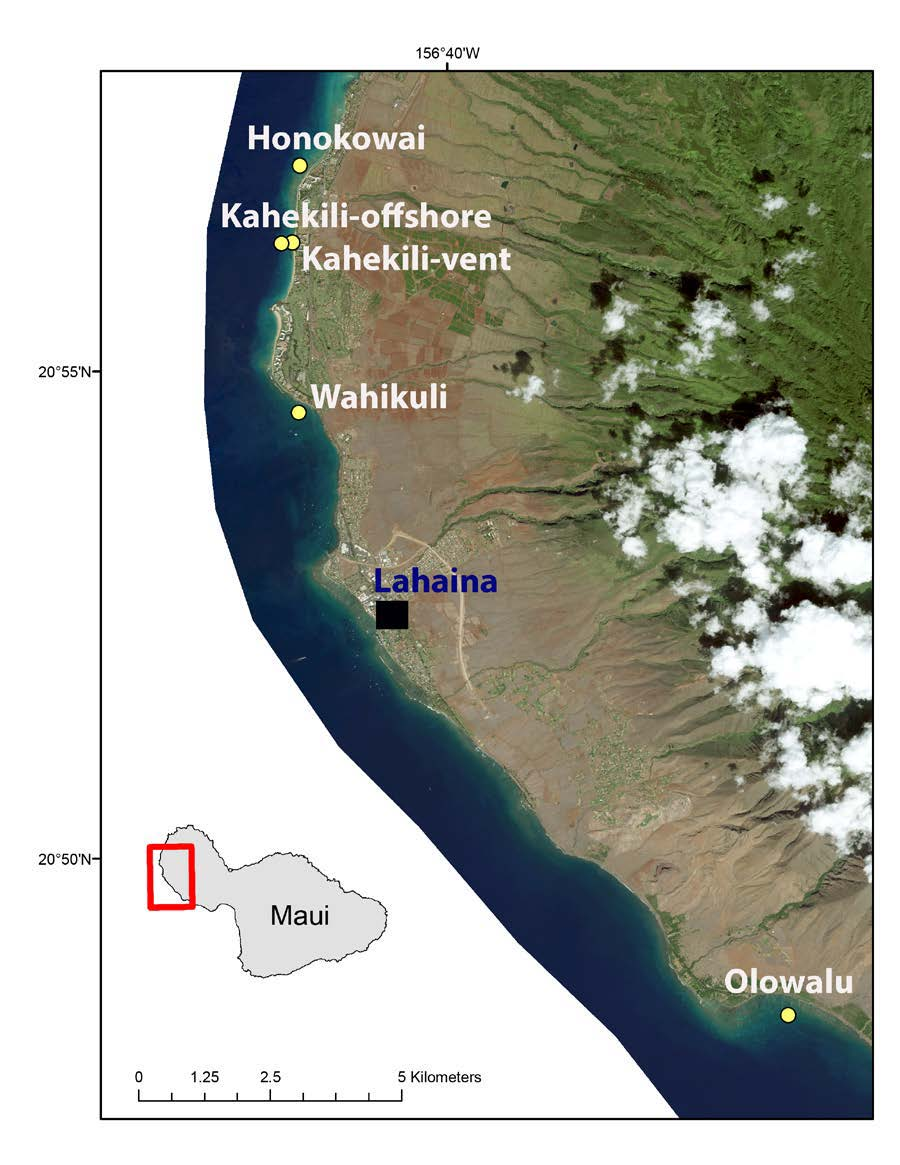
Map of the northwestern shore of the island of Maui, highlighting the location of the Lahaina Wastewater Reclamation Facility and its proximity to the shoreline

In the present case, the Lahaina Wastewater Reclamation Facility in Maui County, Hawaii treats wastewater from homes and businesses. The facility is authorized by the EPA and the Hawaii Department of Health under the SDWA to inject the reclaimed water into four Class V wells on the island, with an average total effluent of 3–5 million US gallons (11–19 million L) per day. Because of the geologic nature of Hawaii, it was estimated that more than 90% of this water eventually enters the surrounding ocean through seepage. During the planning and subsequent reviews of the facility, both the EPA and the state had determined that there was no need for the facility to apply for a NPDES permit, since it was not a point source under the CWA. However, work done by University of Hawaii at Manoa proved that approximately 60% of the injections of wastewater from the Lahaina facility were reaching nearby ocean waters via groundwater using tracer dye studies to track the destination of the wastewater, and piezometer studies observed heightened levels of nutrients at the site.

== Trial court ==
In 2012, several environmental activist groups, including the Hawaii Wildlife Fund, the Surfrider Foundation, the Sierra Club-Maui Group, and the West Maui Preservation Association, represented by Earthjustice, sued the county for lacking appropriate NPDES permits, arguing that their injection wells were truly point sources since past EPA studies using dye tracers had shown it possible to trace the discharge from individual wells into the ocean. Reclaimed water, which can possess higher levels of bacteria and other microorganisms, that seeped into the ocean led to the spread of algal blooms near Maui's shores and could impact the health of coral reefs, aquatic and mammalian life, and humans that live near the shore, according to the environmental groups. The County disputed this with support of the EPA, stating that the wells were not a direct point source defined from the CWA. The suit was filed after the environmental groups plead with the county on civil grounds to seek an NPDES permit in the years prior.

In 2014 the United States District Court for the District of Hawaii found for the plaintiffs, agreeing that the facility needed NPDES permits for the injection wells and for the facility itself.

== Appeal ==
The county appealed to the Ninth Circuit, which also ruled in favor of the plaintiffs in 2018. The Ninth Circuit's decision drew on Rapanos v. United States (2006), in which the plurality decision authored by Justice Antonin Scalia suggested that permits would be required even for point source pollutants that "do not emit 'directly into' covered waters, but pass 'through conveyances' in between." The court claimed that the plain language of the CWA supported the requirement that the discharge from the wastewater plant be subject to permit, held that the Clean Water Act required a permit when pollutants were "fairly traceable" to the original point source. This was a novel test for the CWA, rejecting two standards proposed by the County and the EPA. In the specific case of the Maui wastewater plant, the Ninth Circuit ruled that the pollutants from the wells to the ocean that resulted in pollution concentrations above de minimis levels was "fairly traceable" and thus would need a permit under the CWA. The Ninth Circuit concluded that "at bottom, this case is about preventing the county from doing indirectly that which it cannot do directly". The court declined to hear the case en banc.

During the early parts of the case, the EPA, under President Barack Obama's administration still had upheld the initial statements that there were no need for permits for these types of wells, but had been working with environmentalists to devise new standards. With the election of Donald Trump in 2016, the EPA took a stronger stance against the environmentalist position, and in April 2019, after the trial court and appellate court decisions, issued a new guidance document asserting that the CWA does not cover such discharges. This document is not binding on the Supreme Court.

Regardless of the outcome of the case, the County agreed to pay a US$100,000 fee to the groups should they prevail in the challenge, and are working on developing more projects in Maui to use more of the reclaimed water produced by the plant for beneficial uses as to minimize any seeping to the ocean.

== Supreme Court ==
The County filed its petition for writ of certiorari to the Supreme Court, arguing that the test proposed by the Ninth Circuit for defining a point source discharge conflicted with the Supreme Court's prior ruling in South Florida Water Management District v. Miccosukee Tribe (2004) and upheld in several subsequent cases. The County also raised concerns that this test would affect a significant portion of the other 650,000 Class V wells in operation, requiring these wells to also obtain NPDES permits. The County also referred to the Supreme Court's decision in Michigan v. EPA (2015), which stated the EPA failed to consider the costs necessary in what it considered a "necessary and appropriate" rule-making change to enforcement of the Clear Air Act that affected the nation's power plants. The County believed that the new point source test from the Ninth Circuit would be a similar economic burden. The Supreme Court approved the petition in February 2019.

Oral arguments before the Supreme Court were held November 6, 2019. The Justices debated with the legal representatives on the impact of a ruling in either direction. A ruling that favored the county of Maui could potentially allow wastewater dischargers to simply modify how their wastewater is discharged with minimal cost to avoid EPA's regulations, while a ruling favoring the Wildlife Fund could leave many smaller property owners, including home owners, at fault for unintentional leaks of wastewater from their properties.

== Decision ==
The Court issued its 6–3 decision on April 23, 2020, which vacated the Ninth Circuit's decision and remanded the case to the lower court.

=== Majority opinion and concurrence ===
Justice Stephen Breyer wrote the majority opinion, joined by Chief Justice John Roberts and Associate Justices Ruth Bader Ginsburg, Sonia Sotomayor, Elena Kagan, and Brett Kavanaugh. In his opinion, Breyer wrote that the "fairly traceable" test that the Ninth Circuit had adopted would give the EPA greater authority on pollutant regulation than Congress had given at the time, as the Ninth Circuit's test could apply to a source of pollution that may have occurred a century before and hundreds of miles away due to the slow motion of groundwater. However, the decision also outright rejected the County of Maui's argument that the discharge in the present case did not need a permit, as the language of the CWA as intended by Congress would cover the types of discharge.

In the decision, Breyer asserted that a permit for discharge would be required for point sources, or for non-point sources, for "the functional equivalent of a direct discharge", which had been demonstrated in the present case. Breyer wrote as an example "Where a pipe ends a few feet from navigable waters and the pipe emits pollutants that travel those few feet through groundwater (or over the beach), the permitting requirement clearly applies. If the pipe ends 50 miles from navigable waters and the pipe emits pollutants that travel with groundwater, mix with much other material, and end up in navigable waters only many years later, the permitting requirements likely do not apply." Breyer's opinion included two major factors to be considered in evaluating whether non-point source discharge was functionally equivalent to direct discharge: the distance that the pollutant must travel from the point of discharge to the federal waterway, and the time that it would take. Other factors that can impact this included the ground material that the pollutant traveled through, how the pollutant changed or interacted with other chemicals within the ground, and how much of the pollutant made it to the waterway.

In his concurring opinion, Kavanaugh stressed that the majority opinion was consistent with Rapanos.

=== Dissenting opinions ===
Justice Clarence Thomas wrote a dissent joined by Justice Neil Gorsuch. Thomas took the stance that the CWA was more restrictive and only required a permit from a true direct discharge source, and would have reversed the Ninth Circuit's decision in favor of the County of Maui. Justice Samuel Alito also wrote a dissent, more critical of the majority opinion setting a new standard for determining the need for a permit, but would have also reversed the Ninth's decision.

== Impact ==
Breyer instructed the Ninth on remand to consider the "functional equivalent" test, in guidance with the EPA, to re-evaluate the discharge from the Lahaina Wastewater Reclamation Facility and for similar cases going forward, barring a change in the CWA statute from Congress. This would thus determine if the original case brought by the Hawaii Wildlife Fund could then proceed. The decision is also expected to lead the EPA to develop specific rules related to the "functional equivalent" test to be set in place after public review. Additionally, several pending cases filed by environmentalists against wastewater plants and oil processing companies related to their water discharge are expected to be re-evaluated in light of the majority decision.

The decision was generally seen as a favorable outcome for environmentalists, though the test proposed by Breyer was narrower than what environmentalists had proposed. The decision also rejected the attempt by the Trump administration to remove any type of permit requirements on these sites, as well as rejecting the EPA's attempts to bypass parts of the CWA statute. Other industry sectors such as the chemical and energy sectors feared that this will require a review of their waste discharge, which had previously determined the need for permitting under bright-line rule, with new, vague guidelines set by the Supreme Court.

In July 2021, following the Supreme Court decision, the Hawaii District Court determined that the Lahaina plant's groundwater injection of sewage was the "functional equivalent of a direct discharge" and required the plant to obtain an NPDES permit.
