= Hanousek v. United States =

- Court: United States Court of Appeals for the Ninth Circuit
- Full case name: Edward Hanousek, Jr. v. United States of America
- Argued: May 4, 1998
- Decided: March 19, 1999
- Citations: 176 F.3d 1116; 48 ERC 1303, 99 Cal. Daily Op. Serv. 1987; 1999 Daily Journal D.A.R. 2590

Court membership
- Judges sitting: David R. Thompson, A. Wallace Tashima, Tom Stagg (W.D. La.)

Case opinions
- Majority: Thompson, joined by a unanimous court

Laws applied
- Clean Water Act

Hanousek v. United States, 176 F.3d 1116 (9th Cir. 1999), was a decision by the United States Court of Appeals for the Ninth Circuit, which held that ordinary negligence was the legal standard for criminal negligence under the Clean Water Act.

In 1994, during rock removal operations, a backhoe operator accidentally struck a petroleum pipeline near the railroad tracks. The operator's mistake caused the pipeline to rupture and spill between 1,000 and 5,000 US gallons (3,800 and 18,900 L) of heating oil into the Skagway River. Despite not being present at the scene during operations White Pass and Yukon Route Roadmaster Edward Hanousek, Jr. and President Paul Taylor were both held responsible for the spill and convicted.

The Supreme Court of the United States denied review of the Ninth Circuit's decision, provoking a dissent from two justices.

== Background of the case ==
Hanousek was employed by the Pacific & Arctic Railway and Navigation Company as roadmaster of the White Pass and Yukon Railroad, which runs between Skagway, Alaska, and Whitehorse, Yukon Territory, Canada. As roadmaster, Hanousek was responsible under his contract "for every detail of the safe and efficient maintenance and construction of track, structures, and marine facilities of the entire railroad…and [was to] assume similar duties with special projects."

One of the special projects under Hanousek's supervision was a rock-quarrying project at a site alongside the railroad referred to as "6-mile," located on an embankment 200 feet (61 m) above the Skagway River. The project was designed to realign a sharp curve in the railroad and to obtain armor rock for a ship dock in Skagway. The project involved blasting rock out-croppings alongside the railroad, working the fractured rock toward railroad cars, and loading the rock onto railroad cars with a backhoe. Pacific & Arctic hired Hunz & Hunz, a contracting company, to provide the equipment and labor for the project.

At 6-mile, a high-pressure petroleum products pipeline owned by Pacific & Arctic's sister company, Pacific & Arctic Pipeline, Inc., runs parallel to the railroad at or above ground level, within a few feet of the tracks. To protect the pipeline during the project, a work platform of sand and gravel was constructed, a platform on which the backhoe operated to load rocks over the pipeline and into railroad cars. The location of the work platform changed as the location of the work progressed along the railroad tracks. In addition, when work initially began in April, 1994, Hunz & Hunz covered an approximately 300-foot (91 m) section of the pipeline with railroad ties, sand, and ballast material to protect the pipeline, as was customary.

After Hanousek took over responsibility for the project in May, 1994, no further sections of the pipeline along the 1,000-foot (300 m) worksite were protected, with the exception of the movable backhoe work platform. On the evening of October 1, 1994, Shane Thoe, a Hunz & Hunz backhoe operator, used the backhoe on the work platform to load a train with rocks. After the train departed, Thoe noticed that some fallen rocks had caught the plow of the train as it departed and were located just off the tracks in the vicinity of the unprotected pipeline. At this location, the site had been graded to finish grade and the pipeline was covered with just a few inches of soil. Thoe moved the backhoe off the work platform and drove it down alongside the tracks between 50 and 100 yards (46 and 91 m) from the work platform. While using the back-hoe bucket to sweep the rocks from the tracks, Thoe struck the pipeline causing a rupture. The pipeline was carrying heating oil, and an estimated 1,000 to 5,000 US gallons (3,800 to 18,900 L) of oil were discharged over the course of many days into the adjacent Skagway River.

== Prosecution and Court of Appeals decision ==
Following a United States Coast Guard investigation, Hanousek was charged with one count of negligently discharging a harmful quantity of oil into a navigable water of the United States, in violation of the Clean Water Act. Hanousek and Pacific & Arctic President Paul Taylor were also charged with providing false information to the officials who investigated the accident.

Hanousek was convicted of negligently discharging a harmful quantity of oil into a navigable water, but was acquitted on providing false information. The district court imposed a sentence of six months of imprisonment, six months in a halfway house and six months of supervised release, as well as a fine of $5,000.

In a three judge unanimous opinion written by Judge David R. Thompson the U.S. 9th Circuit Court of Appeals upheld Hanousek's conviction.

== Subsequent proceedings ==
The Supreme Court of the United States denied Hanousek's petition for a writ of certiorari. Justice Clarence Thomas, joined by Justice Sandra Day O'Connor, dissented from the Court's order.
