= United States v. Riverside Bayview =

- Supreme Court of the United States

Argued October 16, 1985 Decided December 4, 1985
- Full case name: United States v. Riverside Bayview Homes Inc.
- Docket no.: 84-701
- Citations: 474 U.S. 121 (more) 106 S. Ct. 455; 88 L. Ed. 2d 419; 1985 U.S. LEXIS 145

Case history
- Prior: 729 F.2d 391 (6th Cir. 1984); cert. granted, 469 U.S. 1206 (1985).

Holding
- The District Court's findings are not clearly erroneous, and plainly bring respondent's property within the category of wetlands, as the language, policies, and history of the Clean Water Act compel a finding that the Corps has acted reasonably in interpreting the Act to require permits for the discharge of material into wetlands adjacent to other "waters of the United States."

Court membership
- Chief Justice Warren E. Burger Associate Justices William J. Brennan Jr. · Byron White; Thurgood Marshall · Harry Blackmun; Lewis F. Powell Jr. · William Rehnquist; John P. Stevens · Sandra Day O'Connor

Case opinion
- Majority: White, joined by unanimous

Laws applied
- Clean Water Act

United States v. Riverside Bayview, 474 U.S. 121 (1985), was a United States Supreme Court case challenging the scope of federal regulatory powers over waterways as pertaining to the definition of "waters of the United States" as written in the Clean Water Act of 1972. The Court ruled unanimously that the government does have the power to control intrastate wetlands as waters of the United States. This ruling was effectively revised in Rapanos v. United States (2006), in which the Court adopted a very narrow interpretation of "navigable waters."

== Prior history ==
The case involves developer Riverside Bayview Homes Inc., which began placing fill materials on its property near the shores of Lake St. Clair, Michigan. The Army Corps of Engineers (Corps) filed suit in Federal District Court to prevent Riverside Bayview from filling its property without dredge and fill exception from the Corps as required under Clean Water Act §404.

The Eastern Michigan District Court held that the property was freshwater wetlands under the Corps's regulatory definition, which reads, "those areas that are inundated or saturated by surface or ground water at a frequency and duration sufficient to support, and that under normal circumstances do support, a prevalence of vegetation typically adapted for life in saturated soil conditions", and as such is subject to the Corps's permit authority because the lands were characterized by those conditions, and the property was adjacent to a body of navigable water. The Court of Appeals reversed, arguing that the Corps overstepped the definition of "waters of the United States", and took the view that the Corps's authority under the Clean Water Act and its implementing regulations must be narrowly construed to avoid a taking without just compensation in violation of the Fifth Amendment, and therefore Riverside Bayview was free to fill its property without obtaining a permit.

== Decision ==
Writing the opinion for a unanimous Court, Justice Byron White ruled that neither the imposition of the permit requirement itself nor the denial of a permit would constitute taking, and that other legislation such as the Tucker Act exist to provide compensation for takings that may result. The Court ruled that the District Court did not err in its finding that the property falls within the Corps's regulatory definition of wetlands. White added that the Clean Water Act's language, policies, and history compel a holding that the Corps acted reasonably in its interpretation of its authorities over discharge material in wetlands.

== See also ==
- List of United States Supreme Court cases, volume 474
- List of United States Supreme Court cases
