= South Florida Water Management District v. Miccosukee Tribe =

- Supreme Court of the United States

Argued January 14, 2004 Decided March 23, 2004
- Full case name: South Florida Water Management District v. Miccosukee Tribe
- Docket no.: 02-626
- Citations: 541 U.S. 95 (more) 124 S. Ct. 1537; 158 L. Ed. 2d 264

Case history
- Prior: 280 F.3d 1364 (11th Cir. 2002)

Court membership
- Chief Justice William Rehnquist Associate Justices John P. Stevens · Sandra Day O'Connor; Antonin Scalia · Anthony Kennedy; David Souter · Clarence Thomas; Ruth Bader Ginsburg · Stephen Breyer

Case opinions
- Majority: O’Connor, joined by Rehnquist, Stevens, Kennedy, Souter, Thomas, Ginsburg, Breyer (in full); Scalia (Parts I and II–A)
- Concur/dissent: Scalia

Laws applied
- Clean Water Act, 33 U.S.C. § 1251 et seq.

South Florida Water Management District v. Miccosukee Tribe, 541 U.S. 95 (2004), was a U.S. Supreme Court case involving the application of the National Pollutant Discharge Elimination System (NPDES) of the Clean Water Act. The Supreme Court remanded the case for further determination to resolve the question over the validity of the distinction between the two bodies of water at issue (a canal and an undeveloped wetland) and the Government's broader "unitary waters" argument that all water bodies that are "navigable waters" under the Clean Water Act should be considered "unitarily" for purposes of NPDES permitting.

== Background ==
The Miccosukee Tribe challenged the South Florida Water Management District on an issue related to the operation of a new pump station (referred as "S-9") that transferred water from a concrete canal (referred as "C-11") to a large undeveloped wetland area near (referred as "WCA-3"). The S-9 pump station, C-11 canal and two levees are components of the Central and South Florida Control Project, a project aimed to address drainage and flood control issues in reclaimed portions of the Everglades. Water conveyed through the C-11 canal collected rainwater from a combination of agricultural, urban, and residential land uses. During rain events, stormwater collected in the C-11 canal contains contaminants such as phosphorus and fertilizers from these developed areas. The WCA-3 area is a remnant of the original South Florida Everglades and the District impounds water in this area to conserve fresh water that might otherwise flow directly to the ocean and to preserve wetland habitat. When the water level in C-11 rises above a set level, S-9 begins operating and pumps water out of the canal and empties the water into WCA-3. The phosphorus in the water alters the balance of WCA-3's ecosystem (which is naturally low in phosphorus) and stimulates the growth of algae and plants that are not naturally found in the Everglades ecosystem.

The Miccosukee Tribe filed suit under the CWA, which prohibits "the discharge of any pollutant by any person" unless done in compliance with the Act. Under the Act's NPDES, dischargers must obtain permits limiting the type and quantity of pollutants they can release into the Nation's waters. The Act defines " 'discharge of a pollutant' " as "any addition of any pollutant to navigable waters from any point source," and defines " 'point source' " as "any discernible, confined and discrete conveyance" "from which pollutants are or may be discharged." The Tribe claimed that S–9 requires an NPDES permit because it moves phosphorus-laden water from C–11 into WCA–3, but the District contended that S–9's operation does not constitute the "discharge of [a] pollutant" under the Act. The District Court granted the Tribe summary judgment, and the Eleventh Circuit affirmed.

== Supreme Court ==
For the purposes of determining whether there has been "any addition of any pollutant to navigable waters from any point source," the Government argued that all water bodies that fall within the Act's definition of "navigable water" should be viewed unitarily for purposes of NPDES permitting requirements. Since the Act requires NPDES permits only when a pollutant is added to navigable waters, the Government contended that such permits are not required when water from one navigable body is discharged, unaltered, into another navigable water. Nonetheless, because neither the District nor the Government raised the "unitary waters" approach before the Eleventh Circuit or in their briefs respecting certiori, the U.S. Supreme Court declined to resolve the argument here and the unitary waters argument was remanded to the lower court. In addition, the U.S. Supreme Court concluded that summary judgment is appropriate only where there is no genuine issue of material fact but some factual issues remain unresolved in this case. Although the District Court correctly characterized the flow through S–9 as non-natural, it appears that if S–9 were shut down, the water in the C–11 canal might flow east instead of west, the water in the canal could flood and would be part of a larger water body. The District Court did not address this issue when it granted summary judgment; therefore, further development of the record was found necessary to resolve the question over the validity of the distinction between C-11 and WCA-3 waters and the Government's broader "unitary waters" argument was left open to the District on remand.
