= S. D. Warren Co. v. Maine Board of Environmental Protection =

- Supreme Court of the United States

Argued February 21, 2006 Decided May 15, 2006
- Full case name: S. D. Warren Co. v. Maine Board of Environmental Protection, et al.
- Citations: 547 U.S. 370 (more) 126 S. Ct. 1843; 164 L. Ed. 2d 625; 2006 U.S. LEXIS 3955; 74 U.S.L.W. 4244

Case history
- Prior: Board decision affirmed, 2004 Me. Super. LEXIS 115 (Me. Super. Ct. May 4, 2004); affirmed, 868 A.2d 210 (Me. 2005); cert. granted, 126 S. Ct. 415 (2005)

Holding
- Because the outflow of water from a hydroelectric dam constitutes a "discharge" into navigable waters, it is subject to the Clean Water Act's requirement of state certification.

Court membership
- Chief Justice John Roberts Associate Justices John P. Stevens · Antonin Scalia; Anthony Kennedy · David Souter; Clarence Thomas · Ruth Bader Ginsburg; Stephen Breyer · Samuel Alito

Case opinion
- Majority: Souter, joined by Roberts, Stevens, Kennedy, Thomas, Ginsburg, Breyer, Alito; Scalia (all but Part III–C)

Laws applied
- 33 U.S.C. § 1341 (Clean Water Act § 401)

S. D. Warren Co. v. Maine Board of Environmental Protection, 547 U.S. 370 (2006), was a case decided by the Supreme Court of the United States involving licensing requirements under the Clean Water Act. The Court ruled unanimously that hydroelectric dams were subject to section 401 of the Act, which conditioned federal licensing for a licensed activity that could result in "any discharge" into navigable waters upon the receipt of a state certification that water protection laws would not be violated. The Court believed that since the Act did not define the word "discharge" it should be given its ordinary meaning, such that the simple flowing forth of water from a dam qualified.

== Background ==
The S. D. Warren Company operates several hydroelectric dams along the course of the Presumpscot River in southern Maine, which generate electricity for its paper mill. Each dam operates by creating a pond, from which water bypasses part of the river to funnel through turbines before flowing back into the riverbed. Licenses to operate the dams are granted by the Federal Energy Regulatory Commission (FERC) pursuant to the Federal Power Act.

In addition to the FERC licenses, the Water Quality Improvement Act of 1970 introduced a specific requirement for activities that could cause a "discharge" into navigable waters. The license for that activity is conditioned on a certification from the State in which the discharge may originate that it will not violate certain water quality standards, including those set by the State's own laws. That requirement was subsequently included in section 401 of the Clean Water Act.

In 1999, S. D. Warren sought to renew federal licenses for five of its dams. It applied for water quality certifications from the Maine Department of Environmental Protection, but it filed its application under protest, claiming that its dams did not result in any "discharge into" the river that would trigger the application of section 401. The Maine agency issued certifications that required Warren to maintain a minimum stream flow in the bypassed portions of the river and to allow passage for various migratory fish and eels. FERC eventually licensed the five dams subject to the Maine conditions, but the company continued to deny any need for state certification under section 401.

After appealing unsuccessfully to Maine's administrative appeals tribunal, the Board of Environmental Protection, Warren filed suit in Cumberland County Superior Court. The court rejected Warren's argument that its dams do not result in discharges, and the Maine Supreme Judicial Court affirmed.

== Opinion of the Court ==
The Court unanimously affirmed the decision of the Maine Supreme Judicial Court. The Court's opinion was delivered by Justice David Souter, and was joined by the whole Court. However, Justice Antonin Scalia, a noted critic of the use of legislative history in statutory interpretation, did not join in Part III-C of the opinion, which criticized the company's argument based on legislative history.

The Court observed that the Clean Water Act did not define discharge, but stated that "the term ‘discharge’ when used without qualification includes a discharge of a pollutant, and a discharge of pollutants." The Act furthermore defined "discharge of a pollutant" and "discharge of pollutants," as meaning "any addition of any pollutant to navigable waters from any point source." The Court believed this meant "discharge" was broader than these definitions, or else the term was superfluous. Because of the lack of a statutory definition, and because it is not a term of art, the Court was left to instead construe it "in accordance with its ordinary or natural meaning."

Citing to Webster's New International Dictionary, the Court explained that "discharge" commonly means a "flowing or issuing out," an ordinary sense of the word that the Court had used in prior water-related cases. A 1994 decision specifically involving section 401 had even used this definition. The Environmental Protection Agency and FERC had also regularly read "discharge" by this plain meaning, so as to cover releases from hydroelectric dams. Though Chevron deference did not apply in this context, the Court nevertheless believed that those usages of "discharge" by those agencies "confirms our understanding of the everyday sense of the term."
