= 2005 term opinions of the Supreme Court of the United States =

October 2005 to October 2006 opinions

The 2005 term of the Supreme Court of the United States began October 3, 2005, and concluded October 1, 2006. The table illustrates which opinion was filed by each justice in each case and which justices joined each opinion.

== Table key ==
Delivered the court's opinion

Joined the court's opinion

Filed a concurrence

Joined a concurrence

Filed a dissent

Joined a dissent

Filed a concurrence/dissent

Joined a concurrence/dissent

Did not participate in the decision
- Decisions that do not note an argument date were decided without oral argument. Decisions that do not note a justice delivering the court's opinion are per curiam.
- Multiple concurrences and dissents within a case are numbered, with joining votes numbered accordingly. Justices frequently join multiple opinions in a single case; each vote is subdivided accordingly.
- An asterisk ( * ) in the court's opinion denotes that it was only a majority in part or a plurality. An asterisk in a joining vote denotes that the justice joined it only in part.
- A dash ( - ) denotes that the justice voted without filing or joining an opinion.

== 2005 term opinions ==
| # | Case name and citation | Argued | Decided | Roberts | Stevens | O'Connor | Scalia | Kennedy | Souter | Thomas | Ginsburg | Breyer | Alito |
|---|---|---|---|---|---|---|---|---|---|---|---|---|---|
| 1 | Dye v. Hofbauer, 546 U.S. 1 | | October 11, 2005 | | | | | | | | | | |
| 2 | Schriro v. Smith, 546 U.S. 6 | | October 17, 2005 | | | | | | | | | | |
| 3 | Kane v. Garcia Espitia, 546 U.S. 9 | | October 31, 2005 | | | | | | | | | | |
| 4 | Eberhart v. United States, 546 U.S. 12 | | October 31, 2005 | | | | | | | | | | |
| 5 | IBP, Inc. v. Alvarez, 546 U.S. 21 | October 3, 2005 | November 8, 2005 | | | | | | | | | | |
| 6 | United States v. Olson, 546 U.S. 43 | October 12, 2005 | November 8, 2005 | | | | | | | | | | |
| 7 | Schaffer v. Weast, 546 U.S. 49 | October 5, 2005 | November 14, 2005 | | | | | | | | 1 | 2 | |
| 8 | Maryland v. Blake, 546 U.S. 72 | November 1, 2005 | November 14, 2005 | | | | | | | | | | |
| 9 | Bradshaw v. Richey, 546 U.S. 74 | | November 28, 2005 | | | | | | | | | | |
| 10 | Lincoln Property Co. v. Roche, 546 U.S. 81 | October 11, 2005 | November 29, 2005 | | | | | | | | | | |
| 11 | Wagnon v. Prairie Band Potawatomi Nation, 546 U.S. 95 | October 3, 2005 | December 6, 2005 | | | | | | | | | | |
| 12 | Martin v. Franklin Capital Corp., 546 U.S. 132 | November 8, 2005 | December 7, 2005 | | | | | | | | | | |
| 13 | Lockhart v. United States, 546 U.S. 142 | November 2, 2005 | December 7, 2005 | | | | | | | | | | |
| 14 | United States v. Georgia, 546 U.S. 151 | November 9, 2005 | January 10, 2006 | | | | | | | | | | |
| 15 | Volvo Trucks North America v. Reeder-Simco GMC, 546 U.S. 164 | October 31, 2005 | January 10, 2006 | | | | | | | | | | |
| 16 | Evans v. Chavis, 546 U.S. 189 | November 9, 2005 | January 10, 2006 | | | | | | | | | | |
| 17 | Brown v. Sanders, 546 U.S. 212 | October 11, 2005 | January 11, 2006 | | 1 | | | | 1 | | 2 | 2 | |
| 18 | Gonzales v. Oregon, 546 U.S. 243 | October 5, 2005 | January 17, 2006 | 1 | | | 1 | | | 1 / 2 | | | |
| 19 | Wachovia Bank, N. A. v. Schmidt, 546 U.S. 303 | November 28, 2005 | January 17, 2006 | | | | | | | | | | |
| 20 | Ayotte v. Planned Parenthood, 546 U.S. 320 | November 30, 2005 | January 18, 2006 | | | | | | | | | | |
| 21 | Rice v. Collins, 546 U.S. 333 | December 5, 2005 | January 18, 2006 | | | | | | | | | | |
| 22 | Will v. Hallock, 546 U.S. 345 | November 28, 2005 | January 18, 2006 | | | | | | | | | | |
| 23 | Central Virginia Community College v. Katz, 546 U.S. 356 | October 31, 2005 | January 23, 2006 | | | | | | | | | | |
| 24 | Unitherm Food Systems, Inc. v. Swift-Eckrich, Inc., 546 U.S. 394 | November 2, 2005 | January 23, 2006 | | | | | | | | | | |
| 25 | Wisconsin Right to Life, Inc. v. FEC, 546 U.S. 410 | January 17, 2006 | January 23, 2006 | | | | | | | | | | |
| 26 | Gonzales v. UDV, 546 U.S. 418 | November 1, 2005 | February 21, 2006 | | | | | | | | | | |
| 27 | Buckeye Check Cashing, Inc. v. Cardegna, 546 U.S. 440 | November 29, 2005 | February 21, 2006 | | | | | | | | | | |
| 28 | Ministry of Defense of Iran v. Elahi, 546 U.S. 450 | | February 21, 2006 | | | | | | | | | | |
| 29 | Ash v. Tyson Foods, Inc., 546 U.S. 454 | | February 21, 2006 | | | | | | | | | | |
| 30 | Lance v. Dennis, 546 U.S. 459 | | February 21, 2006 | | | | | | | | | | |
| 31 | Domino's Pizza, Inc. v. McDonald, 546 U.S. 470 | December 6, 2005 | February 22, 2006 | | | | | | | | | | |
| 32 | Dolan v. United States Postal Service, 546 U.S. 481 | November 7, 2005 | February 22, 2006 | | | | | | | | | | |
| 33 | Arbaugh v. Y & H Corp., 546 U.S. 500 | January 11, 2006 | February 22, 2006 | | | | | | | | | | |
| 34 | Oregon v. Guzek, 546 U.S. 517 | December 7, 2005 | February 22, 2006 | | | | | | | | | | |
| 35 | Texaco, Inc. v. Dagher, 547 U.S. 1 | January 10, 2006 | February 28, 2006 | | | | | | | | | | |
| 36 | Scheidler v. NOW, 547 U.S. 9 | November 30, 2005 | February 28, 2006 | | | | | | | | | | |
| 37 | Illinois Tool Works, Inc. v. Ind. Ink, Inc., 547 U.S. 28 | November 29, 2005 | March 1, 2006 | | | | | | | | | | |
| 38 | Rumsfeld v. FAIR, 547 U.S. 47 | December 6, 2005 | March 6, 2006 | | | | | | | | | | |
| 39 | Merrill Lynch, Pierce, Fenner & Smith, Inc. v. Dabit, 547 U.S. 71 | January 18, 2006 | March 21, 2006 | | | | | | | | | | |
| 40 | United States v. Grubbs, 547 U.S. 90 | January 18, 2006 | March 21, 2006 | | * | | | | * | | * | | |
| 41 | Georgia v. Randolph, 547 U.S. 103 | November 8, 2005 | March 22, 2006 | 1 | 1 | | 1 / 2 | | | 3 | | 2 | |
| 42 | Gonzales v. Thomas, 547 U.S. 183 | | April 17, 2006 | | | | | | | | | | |
| 43 | Salinas v. United States, 547 U.S. 188 | | April 24, 2006 | | | | | | | | | | |
| 44 | Northern Ins. Co. of N.Y. v. Chatham County, 547 U.S. 189 | March 1, 2006 | April 25, 2006 | | | | | | | | | | |
| 45 | Day v. McDonough, 547 U.S. 198 | February 27, 2006 | April 25, 2006 | | 1 | | 2 | | | 2 | | 1 / 2 | |
| 46 | Jones v. Flowers, 547 U.S. 220 | January 17, 2006 | April 26, 2006 | | | | | | | | | | |
| 47 | Hartman v. Moore, 547 U.S. 250 | January 10, 2006 | April 26, 2006 | | | | | | | | | | |
| 48 | Ark. Dep't of Human Servs. v. Ahlborn, 547 U.S. 268 | February 27, 2006 | May 1, 2006 | | | | | | | | | | |
| 49 | Marshall v. Marshall, 547 U.S. 293 | February 28, 2006 | May 1, 2006 | | | | | | | | | | |
| 50 | Holmes v. South Carolina, 547 U.S. 319 | February 22, 2006 | May 1, 2006 | | | | | | | | | | |
| 51 | DaimlerChrysler Corp. v. Cuno, 547 U.S. 332 | March 1, 2006 | May 15, 2006 | | | | | | | | | | |
| 52 | Sereboff v. Mid Atlantic Medical Services, Inc., 547 U.S. 356 | March 28, 2006 | May 15, 2006 | | | | | | | | | | |
| 53 | S. D. Warren Co. v. Maine Bd. of Env. Protection, 547 U.S. 370 | February 21, 2006 | May 15, 2006 | | | | * | | | | | | |
| 54 | eBay Inc. v. MercExchange, L. L. C., 547 U.S. 388 | March 29, 2006 | May 15, 2006 | 1 | 2 | | 1 | 2 | 2 | | 1 | 2 | |
| 55 | Brigham City v. Stuart, 547 U.S. 398 | April 24, 2006 | May 22, 2006 | | | | | | | | | | |
| 56 | Garcetti v. Ceballos, 547 U.S. 410 | March 21, 2006 | May 30, 2006 | | 1 / 2 | | | | 2 | | 2 | 3 | |
| 57 | Anza v. Ideal Steel Supply Corp., 547 U.S. 451 | March 27, 2006 | June 5, 2006 | | | | | | | * / 1 | | 2 | |
| 58 | Zedner v. United States, 547 U.S. 489 | April 18, 2006 | June 5, 2006 | | | | * | | | | | | |
| 59 | Whitman v. Dep't of Transportation, 547 U.S. 512 | | June 5, 2006 | | | | | | | | | | |
| 60 | Mohawk Industries, Inc. v. Williams, 547 U.S. 516 | April 26, 2006 | June 5, 2006 | | | | | | | | | | |
| 61 | House v. Bell, 547 U.S. 518 | January 11, 2006 | June 12, 2006 | | | | | | | | | | |
| 62 | Hill v. McDonough, 547 U.S. 573 | April 26, 2006 | June 12, 2006 | | | | | | | | | | |
| 63 | Hudson v. Michigan, 547 U.S. 586 | May 18, 2006 | June 15, 2006 | | | | * | * | | | | | |
| 64 | Kircher v. Putnam Funds Trust, 547 U.S. 633 | April 24, 2006 | June 15, 2006 | | | | * | | | | | | |
| 65 | Howard Delivery Serv. v. Zurich American Ins. Co., 547 U.S. 651 | March 21, 2006 | June 15, 2006 | | | | | | | | | | |
| 66 | Empire HealthChoice Assurance, Inc. v. McVeigh, 547 U.S. 677 | April 25, 2006 | June 15, 2006 | | | | | | | | | | |
| 67 | Rapanos v. United States, 547 U.S. 715 | February 21, 2006 | June 19, 2006 | 1 | 1 | | * | 2 | 1 | | 1 | 1 / 2 | |
| 68 | Davis v. Washington, 547 U.S. 813 | March 20, 2006 | June 19, 2006 | | | | | | | | | | |
| 69 | Samson v. California, 547 U.S. 843 | February 22, 2006 | June 19, 2006 | | | | | | | | | | |
| 70 | Youngblood v. West Virginia, 547 U.S. 867 | | June 19, 2006 | | | | 1 | 2 | | 1 | | | |
| 71 | Dixon v. United States, 548 U.S. 1 | April 25, 2006 | June 22, 2006 | | | | 2 | 1 | | | | | 2 |
| 72 | Fernandez-Vargas v. Gonzales, 548 U.S. 30 | March 22, 2006 | June 22, 2006 | | | | | | | | | | |
| 73 | Burlington, N. & S. F. R. Co. v. White, 548 U.S. 53 | April 17, 2006 | June 22, 2006 | | | | | | | | | | |
| 74 | Woodford v. Ngo, 548 U.S. 81 | March 22, 2006 | June 22, 2006 | | | | | | | | | | |
| 75 | Lab. Corp. of Am. Holdings v. Metabolite Labs., 548 U.S. 124 | March 21, 2006 | June 22, 2006 | | | | | | | | | | |
| 76 | United States v. Gonzalez-Lopez, 548 U.S. 140 | April 18, 2006 | June 26, 2006 | | | | | | | | | | |
| 77 | Kansas v. Marsh, 548 U.S. 163 | April 25, 2006 | June 26, 2006 | | 1 / 2 | | | | 2 | | 2 | 2 | |
| 78 | Washington v. Recuenco, 548 U.S. 212 | April 17, 2006 | June 26, 2006 | | 1 / 2 | | | | | | 2 | | |
| 79 | Randall v. Sorrell, 548 U.S. 230 | February 28, 2006 | June 26, 2006 | | 1 / 2* | | 2 | 1 | 2 | 2 | 2 | * | * / 3 |
| 80 | Arlington Central School Dist. Bd. of Ed. v. Murphy, 548 U.S. 291 | April 19, 2006 | June 26, 2006 | | 2 | | | | 1 / 2 | | | 2 | |
| 81 | Sanchez-Llamas v. Oregon, 548 U.S. 331 | March 29, 2006 | June 28, 2006 | | | | | | | | * | | |
| 82 | League of United Latin American Citizens v. Perry, 548 U.S. 399 | March 1, 2006 | June 28, 2006 | * / 1 / 3* | * / 2 | | 3 | * | * / 4 | 3 | * / 4 | * / 2* / 5 | * / 1 / 3* |
| 83 | Beard v. Banks, 548 U.S. 521 | March 27, 2006 | June 28, 2006 | | 1 | | | | | | 1 / 2 | * | |
| 84 | Hamdan v. Rumsfeld, 548 U.S. 557 | March 28, 2006 | June 29, 2006 | | * | | 1 / 2 / 3* | * / 1 / 2 | 1* / 2 | 1 / 2 / 3* | 1* / 2 | 1* / 2 | 1 / 2* / 3 |
| 85 | Clark v. Arizona, 548 U.S. 735 | April 19, 2006 | June 29, 2006 | | | | | | | | | * | |
| # | Case name and citation | Argued | Decided | Roberts | Stevens | O'Connor | Scalia | Kennedy | Souter | Thomas | Ginsburg | Breyer | Alito |

== 2005 term membership and statistics ==
This was the first term of Chief Justice Roberts, who was confirmed following the death of Chief Justice William Rehnquist on September 3. Justice O'Connor also retired midterm on January 31, 2006, when she was replaced by Justice Alito. The Court's membership had not changed for the previous eleven terms.

| Justice | | Appointment history | | Agreement with judgment | | Opinions filed | | | | |
| Seniority | Name | President | Date confirmed | % | # | | | | | Total |
|---|---|---|---|---|---|---|---|---|---|---|
| Chief Justice | John Roberts | George W. Bush | September 29, 2005 | 92.6% | 75/81 | 8 | 2 | 2 | 1 | 13 |
| Associate Justice | John Paul Stevens | Gerald Ford | December 19, 1975 | 76.5% | 65/85 | 7 | 6 | 1 | 14 | 28 |
| Associate Justice | Sandra Day O'Connor | Ronald Reagan | September 25, 1981 | 100% | 25/25 | 3 | 0 | 0 | 0 | 3 |
| Associate Justice | Antonin Scalia | Ronald Reagan | September 26, 1986 | 89.4% | 76/85 | 9 | 6 | 1 | 5 | 21 |
| Associate Justice | Anthony Kennedy | Ronald Reagan | February 18, 1988 | 89.4% | 76/85 | 8 | 7 | 0 | 3 | 18 |
| Associate Justice | David Souter | George H. W. Bush | October 9, 1990 | 82.4% | 70/85 | 7 | 1 | 1 | 4 | 13 |
| Associate Justice | Clarence Thomas | George H. W. Bush | October 23, 1991 | 82.1% | 69/84 | 8 | 2 | 2 | 7 | 19 |
| Associate Justice | Ruth Bader Ginsburg | Bill Clinton | August 10, 1993 | 82.4% | 70/85 | 8 | 4 | 0 | 5 | 17 |
| Associate Justice | Stephen Breyer | Bill Clinton | August 3, 1994 | 80% | 68/85 | 7 | 4 | 3 | 10 | 24 |
| Associate Justice | Samuel Alito | George W. Bush | January 31, 2006 | 88.1% | 37/42 | 4 | 3 | 0 | 2 | 9 |
| Notes on statistics: Opinion counts only include the bench opinions listed above; opinions relating to orders or in-chambers opinions are not included.; Agreement with the Court's judgment does not guarantee agreement with the reasoning expressed in its opinion. A justice is not considered in agreement if they dissented even in part. Agreement percentages are based only on the listed cases in which a justice participated and are rounded to the nearest one-tenth of one percentage point. | | | | | | Totals | | | | |
| Notes on statistics: Opinion counts only include the bench opinions listed above; opinions relating to orders or in-chambers opinions are not included.; Agreement with the Court's judgment does not guarantee agreement with the reasoning expressed in its opinion. A justice is not considered in agreement if they dissented even in part. Agreement percentages are based only on the listed cases in which a justice participated and are rounded to the nearest one-tenth of one percentage point. | | | | | | 69 | 35 | 10 | 51 | 165 |
