= Maria L. Martinez =

American labor activist

- Occupations: Labor activist, advocate
- Known for: Prominent role in the 1999 IBP wildcat strike; reform of Teamsters Local 556

Maria L. Martinez is an American labor activist and community advocate. She is best known for leading a 1999 IBP wildcat strike at the Iowa Beef Processors (later Tyson Foods) beef processing plant in Wallula, Washington, and for her role in reforming Teamsters Local 556. She later became an advocate for survivors of domestic violence in Benton and Franklin counties, Washington.

== Early life and education ==
Martinez was born in California into a large migrant farmworking family, one of 19 children. She grew up working as a migrant farmworker before being hired at Iowa Beef Processors Wallula, Washington plant in the late 1980s. She worked there for about a decade. Martinez became a young mother and left high school before completing her diploma, later earning her GED and an associate degree from Columbia Basin College.

== 1998: Reform candidacy and retaliation ==
In March 1998, TeamstersLocal 556 changed its bylaws to allow members to elect shop stewards. Martinez won election as chief shop steward in April 1998 by a vote of 547 to 84.

That summer, she was nominated as a candidate for IBT Western Region International Vice President on the Tom Leedham "Rank and File Power Slate."

Shortly afterward, Iowa Beef Processors rescinded the longstanding practice of assigning the chief steward to the plant's insurance clerk position, which carried higher pay, and forced Martinez back to production line work. The IBT Election Officer noted that IBP provided no documentation of alleged performance problems and that the timing was "proximate" to her candidacy and her role in filing a class action wage-and-hour lawsuit against IBP.

== 1999 Wallula strike ==
On June 4, 1999, hundreds of workers at the Iowa Beef Processors (IBP) beef processing plant in Wallula, Washington, walked off the job in a Wildcat strike. The action, commonly referred to as the 1999 Wallula strike, became one of the most significant labor disputes in the U.S. meatpacking industry during the late 1990s.

The workforce—largely composed of immigrant workers from Mexico, Central America, Southeast Asia, and Bosnia—protested unsafe working conditions, excessive line speeds, low wages, and what they viewed as inadequate support from union leadership.

Maria Martinez emerged as a visible leader during the strike, telling reporters, “Enough is enough is something you can understand in any language.”

The strike lasted approximately five weeks. In the aftermath, Teamsters president James P. Hoffa placed Local 556 under trusteeship, removing Martinez and other reform-oriented leaders from their positions.

== Later union role and legal victories ==
Despite the trusteeship, Martinez briefly served as principal officer of Local 556 and continued organizing campaigns. In 2001, she was a named plaintiff in IBP, Inc. v. Alvarez, a Supreme Court case concerning compensation for donning and doffing protective gear. She helped workers win the lawsuit against Iowa Beef Processors under the Fair Labor Standards Act, securing a judgment that resulted in millions of dollars in back wages for workers, though Iowa Beef Processors resisted paying the award.

As Local 556 leader, she built coalitions linking immigrant workers with students, consumer activists, and animal welfare groups. Tyson Foods attempted to bar her from the Wallula plant and supported a decertification effort against the union.

== Community advocacy ==
After leaving the meatpacking industry, Maria went back to school, received her GED, then her AA from Columbia Basin College. After graduating, she immediately went on to be an advocate for victims of domestic violence with Domestic Violence Services of Benton and Franklin Counties, helping victims facing unsafe and hostile living situations.

== Legacy ==
Eric Schlosser has described Martinez as "one of America's finest union leaders." Labor historians cite her role in the Wallula strike and subsequent campaigns as emblematic of immigrant women's leadership in the late-20th-century U.S. labor movement.
