= IBP, Inc. v. Alvarez =

- Supreme Court of the United States

Argued October 3, 2005 Decided November 8, 2005
- Full case name: IBP, Inc., Petitioner v. Gabriel Alvarez, individually and on behalf of all others similarly situated, et al.
- Citations: 546 U.S. 21 (more) 126 S. Ct. 514; 163 L. Ed. 2d 288
- Argument: Oral argument

Case history
- Prior: Alvarez v. IBP, Inc., 339 F.3d 894 (9th Cir. 2003); cert. granted, 543 U.S. 1144 (2005).

Holding
- Time that workers spend walking between changing and production areas is compensable under the FLSA.

Court membership
- Chief Justice John Roberts Associate Justices John P. Stevens · Sandra Day O'Connor; Antonin Scalia · Anthony Kennedy; David Souter · Clarence Thomas; Ruth Bader Ginsburg · Stephen Breyer

Case opinion
- Majority: Stevens, joined by unanimous

Laws applied
- Fair Labor Standards Act of 1938

IBP, Inc. v. Alvarez, 546 U.S. 21 (2005), is a US labor law case of the a United States Supreme Court, interpreting the Federal Labor Standards Act (FLSA) of 1938, as amended by the Portal-to-Portal Act of 1947.

== Facts ==
Workers for the Iowa Beef Processors, Inc. (IBP, Inc.) (now Tyson Foods, Inc.) filed a class-action lawsuit for unpaid wage reparations. Workers were not being paid for time spent putting on and taking off protective gear, or walking to and from the changing area. IBP, Inc. argued that changing into protective gear did not constitute a “principal activity” of the job and thus was not compensable by law. The lawsuit emerged amid broader labor unrest at IBP’s Wallula, Washington plant, where workers had raised concerns about unsafe line speeds, workplace injuries, and uncompensated preparatory work, issues that were also central to a 1999 IBP wildcat strike at the facility. The case involved plaintiffs including activist and union leader Maria L. Martinez (labor activist).

== Judgment ==
The Supreme Court unanimously held that putting on protective gear and walking to and from changing areas are “integral and indispensable” to the job's “principal activities” and must be paid.

However, the court said that waiting time in a queue for protective gear was “two steps removed from principal activities” and is not compensable under FLSA regulations. Additionally, time spent waiting to put on protective gear before leaving at the end of the workday should be paid. Compensable work hours begin at the time the employer asks employees to arrive. If employees are forced to wait at the beginning of their shift because the employer does not yet have protective gear available, employees will be compensated for their waiting time.

== Significance ==
This case overturned a previous ruling by the United States Court of Appeals, First Circuit, in Tum v Barber Foods, Inc in 2003. Forty-four employees filed a class-action suit against Barber Foods, Inc., identical to employees' complaints against IBP, Inc. Barber Foods successfully argued that time spent donning and doffing protective gear was minimal (2–4 minutes per day) and not included in productive work activity. Thus, Barber Foods was not required to compensate employees for time spent changing, waiting or walking between the changing room and the meatpacking floor.

== See also ==
- 1999 IBP wildcat strike
