= List of United States Supreme Court cases, volume 548 =

This is a list of all the United States Supreme Court cases from volume 548 of the United States Reports:

Case name	Citation	Date decided
Dixon v. United States	548 U.S. 1	2006
A criminal defendant who claims to have acted under duress must prove the claim by a preponderance of the evidence.
Fernandez-Vargas v. Gonzales	548 U.S. 30	2006
Section 241(a)(5) of the Illegal Immigration Reform and Immigrant Responsibility Act of 1996 applies to those who reentered the United States before the effective date of the Act and it does not retroactively affect any right of, or impose any burden on, the continuing violator of the INA now before this Court.
Burlington N. & S.F.R.R. Co. v. White	548 U.S. 53	2006
The anti-retaliation provision (42 U. S. C. §2000e–3(a)) under Title VII of the Civil Rights Act of 1964 does not confine the actions and harms it forbids to those that are related to employment or occur at the workplace.
Woodford v. Ngo	548 U.S. 81	2006
The Prison Litigation Reform Act of 1995 (PLRA) requirement that a prisoner exhaust any available administrative remedies before challenging prison conditions in federal court bars him from doing so not only when this first lawsuit has been lost, but also when he failed to timely brought it.
LabCorp v. Metabolite, Inc.	548 U.S. 124	2006
Dismissed as improvidently granted.
United States v. Gonzalez-Lopez	548 U.S. 140	2006
A trial court's erroneous deprivation of a criminal defendant's choice of counsel entitles him to a reversal of his conviction.
Kansas v. Marsh	548 U.S. 163	2006
The Eighth Amendment does not prohibit states from imposing the death penalty when aggravating and mitigating sentencing factors are in equipoise.
Washington v. Recuenco	548 U.S. 212	2006
Failure to submit a sentencing factor to the jury is not "structural" error, and therefore does not entitle to reversal of conviction if the error was harmless.
Randall v. Sorrell	548 U.S. 230	2006
Vermont's campaign finance restrictions violated the First Amendment. Second Circuit reversed and remanded.
Arlington Cent. Sch. Dist. Bd. of Ed. v. Murphy	548 U.S. 291	2006
Sanchez-Llamas v. Oregon	548 U.S. 331	2006
States could admit evidence against defendants even if the evidence was obtained in violation of the Vienna Convention.
League of United Latin American Citizens v. Perry	548 U.S. 399	2006
Texas's redrawing of District 23’s lines amounts to vote dilution violative of §2 of the Voting Rights Act of 1965, while other newly created districts remain constitutional. The judgment is affirmed in part, reversed in part, vacated in part, and remanded.
Beard v. Banks	548 U.S. 521	2006
Prison officials had adequate legal support for their policy of withholding reading material from incorrigible inmates.
Hamdan v. Rumsfeld	548 U.S. 557	2006
Military commission to try petitioner is illegal and lacking the protections required under the Geneva Conventions and United States Uniform Code of Military Justice.
Clark v. Arizona	548 U.S. 735	2006
Due process does not prohibit Arizona's use of an insanity test stated solely in terms of the capacity to tell whether an act charged as a crime was right or wrong. The state could also constitutionally limit a defendant's evidence of mental defect to only what is relevant to that insanity test, even when mens rea is an element of the charged crime. Arizona Court of Appeals affirmed.
