= Dixon v. United States =

- Supreme Court of the United States

Argued April 25, 2006 Decided June 22, 2006
- Full case name: Keshia Currie Ashford Dixon v. United States
- Docket no.: 05-7053
- Citations: 548 U.S. 1 (more) 126 S. Ct. 2437; 165 L. Ed. 2d 299

Case history
- Prior: United States v. Dixon, 413 F.3d 520 (5th Cir. 2005); rehearing en banc denied, 163 F. App'x 351 (5th Cir. 2005); cert. granted, 546 U.S. 1135 (2006).

Holding
- A criminal defendant who claims to have acted under duress must prove the claim by a preponderance of the evidence.

Court membership
- Chief Justice John Roberts Associate Justices John P. Stevens · Antonin Scalia; Anthony Kennedy · David Souter; Clarence Thomas · Ruth Bader Ginsburg; Stephen Breyer · Samuel Alito

Case opinions
- Majority: Stevens, joined by Roberts, Scalia, Kennedy, Thomas, Ginsburg, Alito
- Concurrence: Kennedy
- Concurrence: Alito, joined by Scalia
- Dissent: Breyer, joined by Souter

Laws applied
- Due Process Clause, Omnibus Crime Control and Safe Streets Act of 1968

Dixon v. United States, 548 U.S. 1 (2006), was a United States Supreme Court case concerning the level of proof required to establish the affirmative defense of duress in a federal criminal case.

== Background ==
In January 2003 the petitioner, Keshia Dixon, purchased firearms at two gun shows. In the course of purchasing them, she provided a false address and falsely stated that she was not under indictment for a felony. Dixon was arrested, tried, and convicted of one count of receiving a firearm while under indictment in violation of 18 U.S.C. § 922(n) and eight counts of making false statements in connection with the acquisition of a firearm in violation of § 922(a)(6).

=== Procedural history ===
At trial, Dixon admitted that she knew she was under indictment when she bought the weapons and that she knew doing so was a crime; her defense was that she acted under duress because her boyfriend threatened to kill her or hurt her daughters if she did not buy the guns for him. In his charge to the jury, the trial judge required her to prove duress by a preponderance of the evidence. After her conviction, Dixon appealed, alleging that this standard was erroneous. The Fifth Circuit Court of Appeals rejected the appeal. Other circuits having ruled to the contrary, the Supreme Court granted certiorari to resolve the circuit split.

=== Issue ===
The Supreme Court granted certiorari on the issue of whether the burden of proof in the jury instruction concerning the duress defense violated the Constitution's Due Process Clause and, if so, what should the proper burden of proof be?

=== Parties' arguments ===
Dixon contended that once she presented some evidence that she acted under duress, the government should have to disprove duress in order to meet its burden of establishing the guilt of the accused. The government contended they need only prove the elements of the crime, and that Dixon needed to establish duress to be found not guilty.

== Opinion of the Court ==
The court sided with the government, holding that "The duress defense, like the defense of necessity that we considered in Bailey v. United States ... may excuse conduct that would otherwise be punishable, but the existence of duress normally does not controvert any of the elements of the offense itself."

As to the second question, that of what standard would be appropriate, Justice Stevens wrote that Congress's lack of direction made the decision difficult. "There is no evidence in the Act’s structure or history that Congress actually considered the question of how the duress defense should work in this context, and there is no suggestion that the offenses at issue are incompatible with a defense of duress. Assuming that a defense of duress is available to the statutory crimes at issue, then, we must determine what that defense would look like as Congress 'may have contemplated' it." The general practice at the time the statute was written (1968) was to use the common law rule giving the defendant the burden of proof by a preponderance of the evidence. Stevens held for the majority that this was the standard that should apply.

=== Concurrences ===
==== Kennedy's concurrence ====
Justice Kennedy concurred in the result, but suggested that the Court should not limit the standards lower courts might apply. "Absent some contrary indication in the statute, we can assume that Congress would not want to foreclose the courts from consulting these newer sources and considering innovative arguments in resolving issues not confronted in the statute and not within the likely purview of Congress when it enacted the criminal prohibition applicable in the particular case."

==== Alito's concurrence ====
Justice Alito agreed with Stevens, but would have held that the common law rule applied to all federal crimes absent some indication otherwise. "Although Congress is certainly free to alter this pattern and place one or both burdens on the prosecution, either for all or selected federal crimes, Congress has not done so but instead has continued to revise the federal criminal laws and to create new federal crimes without addressing the issue of duress. Under these circumstances, I believe that the burdens remain where they were when Congress began enacting federal criminal statutes."

=== Dissent ===
Justice Breyer wrote that the government should have the burden of proof in affirmative defenses. "I agree with the majority that the burden of production lies on the defendant, that here the burden of persuasion issue is not constitutional, and that Congress may allocate that burden as it sees fit. But I also believe that, in the absence of any indication of a different congressional intent, the burden of persuading the jury beyond a reasonable doubt should lie where such burdens normally lie in criminal cases, upon the prosecution."
