= 1999 IBP wildcat strike =

Labor dispute in Washington, United States

In 1999, nearly 800 workers at the Iowa Beef Processors plant (later Tyson Foods) in Wallula, Washington, walked off the job in a wildcat strike. Workers had grown frustrated with stalled contract negotiations, hazardous working conditions, and low wages. The immediate trigger occurred when a worker was removed from the production line for allegedly not keeping up with the line speed—the rate at which pieces of meat moved through specialized cutting lines. Employees left the line in protest, citing unsafe increases in line speed, frequent injuries, and retaliation against union activists.

Most of the workers involved in the strike were immigrants who lived in nearby communities including the Tri-Cities, Walla Walla, and Burbank. The strike lasted roughly five weeks and became an important episode in Pacific Northwest labor organizing. It occurred during the same period as the federal wage-and-hour lawsuit IBP, Inc. v. Alvarez, which later established national precedent.IBP, Inc. v. Alvarez.

== Background ==
During the 1990s, the Iowa Beef Processors facility near Wallula, Washington, became one of the largest employers in the region. The plant relied heavily on immigrant labor from Latin America and Eastern Europe, with many workers commuting from Pasco, Kennewick, Richland, Walla Walla, and surrounding communities. Work on the cutting and processing lines was fast-paced and physically demanding, and critics argued that increasing line speeds contributed to repetitive-motion injuries and accidents. Disputes over safety, production pressure, wages, and disciplinary practices set the stage for escalating tensions between the company and workers.

== Origins of the strike ==
Tensions at the Wallula plant escalated in early June 1999. Workers on the production line reported that supervisors were increasing line speeds and disciplining employees who could not maintain the pace. According to contemporary reporting, the immediate trigger occurred when a worker was removed from the line for allegedly failing to keep up with production demands. Other workers stopped work in solidarity and walked off the floor, and the action quickly spread throughout the plant.

IBP initially characterized the walkout as an internal dispute and sought to continue operations with remaining employees. Workers, however, described the action as a response to unsafe working conditions, speed-ups, and perceived retaliation against union supporters.

== The strike ==
The walkout at the Wallula plant grew into a full work stoppage that lasted for several weeks. Workers organized picket lines outside the facility and attempted to prevent replacement crews from entering. Many participants described the strike as a spontaneous action rather than one formally initiated by the union, leading observers to characterize it as a “wildcat” strike.

Although Local 556 of the International Brotherhood of Teamsters represented the plant, the union leadership initially took a cautious position toward the strike. IBP continued production with non-striking workers and temporary replacements, while hiring security and seeking court limits on picketing activity. Strikers reported job insecurity, injuries, and line-speed pressure as central grievances, along with accusations of retaliation against outspoken shop stewards.

The dispute drew attention from labor activists across the region and highlighted divisions over strategy within the Teamsters, as well as the broader challenges faced by immigrant industrial workers in rural communities.

Maria L. Martinez, then a chief shop steward at the plant and a prominent figure in Teamsters Local 556, became one of the most visible worker leaders during the strike. Martinez publicly defended the walkout as a response to unsafe line speeds and retaliation against union activists, and she later became a central figure in related labor disputes and litigation involving IBP.

== Company response ==
IBP characterized the strike as unauthorized and disruptive, emphasizing the contract’s no-strike clause. Contemporary reporting described attempts to discourage participation and alleged disciplinary measures against some workers following the walkout.

The company denied wrongdoing regarding pay practices and workplace conditions.

== Relationship to IBP, Inc. v. Alvarez ==
At the same time, IBP workers were pursuing legal action claiming they were not compensated for time spent putting on and removing required protective gear. That litigation later reached the United States Supreme Court as IBP, Inc. v. Alvarez, which affirmed that such time was compensable work under federal law.

The strike is frequently discussed as part of the broader conflict between IBP and its workforce during this period.

== Aftermath and legacy ==
The strike at Wallula eventually ended with most workers returning to the plant, though some reported losing their jobs during or after the dispute. In the years that followed, conflicts over compensation and working time continued, particularly regarding whether employees should be paid for the time required to put on and remove protective equipment.

These disputes contributed to the federal case that became known as IBP, Inc. v. Alvarez, in which courts ultimately ruled that donning and doffing required safety gear constituted compensable work under the Fair Labor Standards Act.

The strike also became a reference point in discussions of meatpacking safety, immigrant labor, and the limits of union power in highly industrialized food-processing facilities. Labor writers and activists later cited Wallula as an example of the tensions created by rising production speeds and reliance on vulnerable workforces in rural communities.

== See also ==
Maria L. Martinez
