= Douglas v. Independent Living Center of Southern California =

- Supreme Court of the United States

Decided February 22, 2012
- Full case name: Douglas v. Independent Living Center of Southern California
- Citations: 565 U.S. 606 (more)

Case history
- Prior: 572 F.3d 644 (2009); 342 Fed. Appx. 306 (2009); 596 F.3d 1098 (2010); 563 F.3d 847 (2009); 374 Fed. Appx. 690 (2010); 596 F.3d 1087 (2010); and 380 Fed. Appx. 656 (2010)

Holding
- Due to changed circumstances, remanded for consideration of whether a private Supremacy Clause challenge can be made when agency litigation is possible.

Court membership
- Chief Justice John Roberts Associate Justices Antonin Scalia · Anthony Kennedy; Clarence Thomas · Ruth Bader Ginsburg; Stephen Breyer · Samuel Alito; Sonia Sotomayor · Elena Kagan

Case opinions
- Majority: Breyer, joined by Kennedy, Ginsburg, Sotomayor, Kagan
- Dissent: Roberts, joined by Scalia, Thomas, Alito

Laws applied
- Supremacy Clause

Douglas v. Independent Living Center of Southern California, 565 U.S. 606 (2012), was a United States Supreme Court case in which the court declined to make a firm decision. The plaintiffs in the case asserted that the Supremacy Clause gave them a private right to sue for the enforcement of the federal Medicaid law when a state Medicaid law conflicted with it. Due to changed circumstances while the appeal was ongoing, the court remanded the case to the Ninth Circuit Court of Appeals for consideration of whether a private Supremacy Clause challenge can be made when agency litigation is possible.

== Background ==
Medicaid is a cooperative federal–state program that provides medical care to needy individuals. To qualify for federal funds, a state must submit its Medicaid plan and any amendments to the federal agency that administers the program, the Centers for Medicare & Medicaid Services (CMS). Before approving a plan or amendments, CMS conducts a review to determine whether they comply with federal requirements. Federal law requires state plans or amendments to "assure that payments are consistent with efficiency, economy, and quality of care and are sufficient to enlist enough providers" to make Medicaid "care and services" available in 42 U.S.C. §1396a(a)(30)(A).

After California enacted three statutes reducing the State's payments to various Medicaid providers, the State submitted plan amendments to CMS. Before the agency finished its review, Medicaid providers and beneficiaries sought, in a series of cases, to enjoin the rate reductions on the ground that they were preempted by federal Medicaid law. In seven decisions, the Ninth Circuit Court of Appeals ultimately affirmed or ordered preliminary injunctions preventing California from implementing its statutes. The court (1) held that the providers and beneficiaries could bring a Supremacy Clause action; (2) essentially accepted their claim that California did not show that its amended plan would provide sufficient services; (3) held that the amendments thus conflicted with §1396a(a)(30)(A); and (4) held that the federal statute preempted the new state laws.

In the meantime, agency officials disapproved the amendments, and California sought further administrative review. The cases were in this posture when the Court granted certiorari to decide whether respondents could mount a Supremacy Clause challenge. After oral argument, CMS approved several of the State's amendments, and the State withdrew its requests for approval of the remainder.

== Opinion of the court ==
The Supreme Court issued an opinion on February 22, 2012. Because of the change after oral arguments, the court did not think it was prudent to decide whether the Supremacy Clause provides any private right to sue for the enforcement of a federal law. Instead, the court remanded to the Ninth Circuit for reconsideration in light of the court's commentary on the case and the changed procedural posture.

== Later developments ==
The court encountered a similar issue in Wos v. E.M.A.. In that case, Kennedy wrote the majority opinion and did not align with the reasoning of the Douglas dissenters.
