= Wos v. E.M.A. =

- Supreme Court of the United States

Decided March 20, 2013
- Full case name: Wos v. E.M.A.
- Citations: 568 U.S. 627 (more)

Holding
- The federal Medicaid statute's anti-lien provision preempts a state's irrebuttable statutory presumption that one-third of a tort recovery is attributable to medical expenses.

Court membership
- Chief Justice John Roberts Associate Justices Antonin Scalia · Anthony Kennedy; Clarence Thomas · Ruth Bader Ginsburg; Stephen Breyer · Samuel Alito; Sonia Sotomayor · Elena Kagan

Case opinions
- Majority: Kennedy, joined by Ginsburg, Breyer, Alito, Sotomayor, Kagan
- Concurrence: Breyer
- Dissent: Roberts, joined by Scalia, Thomas

Wos v. E.M.A., (Note: E.M.A. was a minor whose name was disguised.) 568 U.S. 627 (2013) was a United States Supreme Court case in which the court held that the federal Medicaid statute's anti-lien provision preempts a state's irrebuttable statutory presumption that one-third of a tort recovery is attributable to medical expenses.

== Background ==
In Arkansas Dept. of Health and Human Servs. v. Ahlborn, the Supreme Court held that the federal Medicaid statute's anti-lien provision, 42 U. S. C. §1396p(a)(1), preempts a state's effort to take any portion of a Medicaid beneficiary's tort judgment or settlement not "designated as payments for medical care." A North Carolina statute required that up to one-third of any damages recovered by a beneficiary for a tortious injury be paid to the state to reimburse it for payments it made for medical treatment on account of the injury.

E.M.A., a minor, was born with multiple serious birth injuries that require her to receive between 12 and 18 hours of skilled nursing care per day and that will prevent her from being able to work, live independently, or provide for her basic needs. North Carolina's Medicaid program pays part of the cost of her ongoing medical care. E.M.A. and her parents filed a medical malpractice suit against the physician who delivered her and the hospital where she was born. They presented expert testimony estimating their damages to exceed $42 million, but they ultimately settled for $2.8 million, due in large part to insurance policy limits. The settlement did not allocate money among their various medical and nonmedical claims. In approving the settlement, the state court placed one-third of the recovery into escrow pending a judicial determination of the amount of the lien owed by E.M.A. to the state. E.M.A. and her parents then sought declaratory and injunctive relief in federal District Court, claiming that the state's reimbursement scheme violated the Medicaid anti-lien provision. While that litigation was pending, the North Carolina Supreme Court held in another case that the irrebuttable statutory one-third presumption was a reasonable method for determining the amount due the State for medical expenses. The federal District Court, in E.M.A.'s case, agreed. But the Fourth Circuit Court of Appeals vacated and remanded, concluding that the State's statutory scheme could not be reconciled with Ahlborn.

The Supreme Court granted certiorari. The court had faced a similar question in Douglas v. Independent Living Center of Southern California, but changed circumstances while that case was ongoing left the core issues unresolved.

== Opinion of the court ==
The Supreme Court issued an opinion on March 20, 2013.
