= Martin v. Franklin Capital Corp. =

- Supreme Court of the United States

Decided December 7, 2005
- Full case name: Martin v. Franklin Capital Corp.
- Citations: 546 U.S. 132 (more)

Holding
- Absent unusual circumstances, attorney's fees should not be awarded under §1447(c) when the removing party has an objectively reasonable basis for removal. Conversely, where no objectively reasonable basis exists, fees should be awarded.

Court membership
- Chief Justice John Roberts Associate Justices John P. Stevens · Sandra Day O'Connor; Antonin Scalia · Anthony Kennedy; David Souter · Clarence Thomas; Ruth Bader Ginsburg · Stephen Breyer

Laws applied
- 28 U.S.C. §1447(c)

Martin v. Franklin Capital Corp., 546 U.S. 132 (2005), was a United States Supreme Court case in which the court held that, absent unusual circumstances, attorney's fees should not be awarded under 28 U.S.C. §1447(c) when the removing party has an objectively reasonable basis for removal. Conversely, where no objectively reasonable basis exists, fees should be awarded.

== Background ==
In removing the Martins' state-court class action to federal court on diversity grounds, the defendants (collectively, Franklin) acknowledged that the amount in controversy was not clear from the face of the state-court complaint, but they argued that this requirement for federal diversity jurisdiction was nonetheless satisfied under precedent suggesting that punitive damages and attorney's fees could be aggregated in making the calculation. The federal District Court denied the Martins' motion to remand to state court and eventually dismissed the case with prejudice. Reversing and remanding with instructions to remand to state court, the Tenth Circuit Court of Appeals agreed with the Martins that their suit failed to satisfy the amount-in-controversy requirement and rejected Franklin's aggregation theory under decisions issued after the District Court's remand decision. The latter court then denied the Martins' motion for attorney's fees because Franklin had legitimate grounds for believing this case fell within federal-court jurisdiction. Affirming, the Tenth Circuit disagreed with the Martins' argument that attorney's fees should be granted on remand as a matter of course under 28 U.S.C. §1447(c), which provides that a remand order "may require payment of just costs and any actual expenses, including attorney fees" but provides little guidance on when fees are warranted. The court noted that fee awards are left to the district court's discretion, subject to review only for abuse of discretion; pointed out that, under Circuit precedent, the key factor in deciding whether to award fees is the propriety of removal; and held that, because Franklin had relied on case law only subsequently held to be unsound, its basis for removal was objectively reasonable, and the fee denial was not an abuse of discretion.

The Supreme Court granted certiorari.

== Opinion of the court ==
The Supreme Court issued an opinion on December 7, 2005.

Martin was the first decision written by Chief Justice John Roberts.
