= United States v. Olson =

- Supreme Court of the United States

Decided November 8, 2005
- Full case name: United States v. Olson
- Citations: 546 U.S. 43 (more)

Holding
- Under the Federal Tort Claims Act, the United States waives sovereign immunity only where local law would make a "private person" liable in tort, not where local law would make "a state or municipal entity" liable.

Court membership
- Chief Justice John Roberts Associate Justices John P. Stevens · Sandra Day O'Connor; Antonin Scalia · Anthony Kennedy; David Souter · Clarence Thomas; Ruth Bader Ginsburg · Stephen Breyer

Case opinion
- Majority: Breyer, joined by unanimous

Laws applied
- Federal Tort Claims Act

United States v. Olson, 546 U.S. 43 (2005), was a United States Supreme Court case in which the court held that under the Federal Tort Claims Act, the United States waives sovereign immunity only where local law would make a "private person" liable in tort, not where local law would make "a state or municipal entity" liable.

== Background ==
Claiming that federal mine inspectors' negligence helped cause a mine accident, two injured workers (and a spouse) sued the United States under the Federal Tort Claims Act (FTCA), which authorizes private tort actions against the federal government "under circumstances where the United States, if a private person, would be liable to the claimant in accordance with the law of the place where the act or omission occurred." The federal District Court dismissed in part on the ground that the allegations did not show that Arizona law would impose liability upon a private person in similar circumstances.

The Ninth Circuit Court of Appeals reversed, reasoning from two premises: (1) Where unique governmental functions are at issue, the FTCA waives sovereign immunity if a state or municipal entity would be held liable under the law where the activity occurred, and (2) federal mine inspections are such unique governmental functions since there is no private-sector analogue for mine inspections. Because Arizona law would make a state or municipal entity liable in the circumstances alleged, the Circuit concluded that the United States' sovereign immunity was waived.

The Supreme Court granted certiorari.

== Opinion of the court ==
The Supreme Court issued an opinion on November 8, 2005. Speaking for a unanimous court, Justice Stephen Breyer said:

The Act says that it waives sovereign immunity "under circumstances where the United States, if a private person," not "the United States, if a state or municipal entity," would be liable. Our cases have consistently adhered to this "private person" standard.
