= Wagnon v. Prairie Band Potawatomi Indians =

- Supreme Court of the United States

Argued October 3, 2005 Decided December 6, 2005
- Full case name: Wagnon v. Prairie Band Potawatomi Indians
- Citations: 546 U.S. 95 (more) 126 S. Ct. 676; 163 L. Ed. 2d 429; 2005 U.S. LEXIS 9229
- Argument: Oral argument

Case history
- Prior: 379 F.3d 979 (10th Cir. 2004)

Holding
- A state's non-discriminatory fuel tax imposed on off-reservation distributors does not pose an affront to a tribe's sovereignty.

Court membership
- Chief Justice John Roberts Associate Justices John P. Stevens · Sandra Day O'Connor; Antonin Scalia · Anthony Kennedy; David Souter · Clarence Thomas; Ruth Bader Ginsburg · Stephen Breyer

Case opinions
- Majority: Thomas, joined by Roberts, Stevens, O'Connor, Scalia, Souter, Breyer
- Dissent: Ginsburg, joined by Kennedy

Wagnon v. Prairie Band Potawatomi Indians, 546 U.S. 95 (2005), was a case in which the Supreme Court of the United States held that a state's non-discriminatory fuel tax imposed on off-reservation distributors does not pose an affront to a tribe's sovereignty.

== Background ==
The Prairie Band Potawatomi Nation is a federally recognized Indian (Native American) tribe with a reservation in Jackson County, Kansas. The tribe operates a gas station on the reservation, buying the fuel from off-reservation distributors. Under Kansas law, the distributors pay state tax on receipt of the fuel and pass on the costs to their customers, including the tribe. As a federally recognized tribe, a state may not directly tax the tribe absent the authorization of Congress.

A previous Supreme Court case had struck down a state fuel tax imposed on gas sold by the Chickasaw Nation in 1995. Kansas had, subsequent to the Oklahoma Tax Commission v. Chickasaw Nation, 515 U.S. 450 (1995) decision, imposed the tax on the non-Indian distributors of fuel and not on the tribe as the retail seller. The Potawatomi tribe viewed this as an attack on their tribal sovereignty and filed suit in the United States District Court for the District of Kansas.

The District Court upheld the state tax, and the tribe appealed to the Tenth Circuit Court of Appeals. The appellate court reversed the decision of the trial court, ruling that the state's tax infringed on the tribe's right of self-government. Kansas appealed to the Supreme Court, which granted certiorari to hear the case.

== Opinion of the Court ==
Justice Clarence Thomas delivered the opinion of the court. Justice Thomas reasoned that the taxation took place off-reservation and was neither discriminatory nor an affront to tribal sovereignty. Accordingly, the court reversed the decision of the Tenth Circuit and ruled that the tax was valid.
