= United States v. Georgia =

- Supreme Court of the United States

Argued November 11, 2005 Decided January 10, 2006
- Full case name: United States v. Georgia, et al.; Tony Goodman v. Georgia, et al.
- Docket no.: 04-1203
- Citations: 546 U.S. 151 (more) 126 S. Ct. 877; 163 L. Ed. 2d 650

Case history
- Prior: Goodman v. Ray, 120 F. App'x 785 (11th Cir. 2004), cert. granted sub nom., Goodman v. Georgia, 544 U.S. 1031 (2005).

Holding
- The Americans with Disabilities Act of 1990 applies to state prisons.

Court membership
- Chief Justice John Roberts Associate Justices John P. Stevens · Sandra Day O'Connor; Antonin Scalia · Anthony Kennedy; David Souter · Clarence Thomas; Ruth Bader Ginsburg · Stephen Breyer

Case opinions
- Majority: Scalia, joined by a unanimous court
- Concurrence: Stevens, joined by Ginsburg

Laws applied
- Americans with Disabilities Act of 1990; U.S. Const. Amend. XIV

United States v. Georgia, 546 U.S. 151 (2006), was a United States Supreme Court case in which the Court decided that the protection of Americans with Disabilities Act of 1990 (ADA), passed by the U.S. Congress, extends to persons held in a state prison and protects prison inmates from discrimination on the basis of disability by prison personnel. Specifically, the court held that Title II of the Americans with Disabilities Act of 1990, 42 U.S.C. §§ 12131–12165., is a proper use of Congressional power under the Fourteenth Amendment, Section 5, making it applicable to prison system officials.

== Facts of the case ==
The petitioner, Tony Goodman, a paraplegic prisoner using a wheelchair, sued the State of Georgia and others alleging that the conditions of his confinement in the Georgia state prison system violated ADA. Goodman stated that, because of his disability, he was kept in his cell for twenty-three hours per day, a cell too narrow for him to move his wheelchair, and denied access to medical treatment, such as catheters, treatment for bed sores and boils and access to mental health care, and to other privileges granted to prison inmates, such as access to programs, classes, and religious activities. Further, he claimed the prison was not handicapped accessible. For example, the prison did not make toilet and bathing facilities accessible to him, such that he was occasionally forced to sit in his own human waste. He was also injured multiple times while trying to transfer from his wheelchair to the shower or toilet himself, as assistance in these matters was denied.

The position of Georgia was that state prisons were immune from suit for damages, claiming that the U.S. Congress had exceeded its constitutional authority in authorizing suits for damages against states under ADA.

== Decision ==
The Supreme Court was unanimous in its decision. It ruled that Congress has the authority to apply ADA to the administration of state prisons to the extent that it relates to conduct that actually violates the Fourteenth Amendment. Thus Congress was granted more authority over the States in this area of disability rights.

== See also ==
- List of United States Supreme Court cases, volume 546
- List of United States Supreme Court cases
