= Burlington Northern & Santa Fe Railway Co. v. White =

- Supreme Court of the United States

Argued April 17, 2006 Decided June 22, 2006
- Full case name: Burlington Northern and Santa Fe Railway Company, Petitioner v. Sheila White
- Docket no.: 05-259
- Citations: 548 U.S. 53 (more) 126 S. Ct. 2405; 165 L. Ed. 2d 345

Case history
- Prior: White v. Burlington Northern & Santa Fe Railroad Co., 364 F.3d 789 (6th Cir. 2004).

Holding
- The anti-retaliation provision (42 U. S. C. §2000e–3(a)) under Title VII of the Civil Rights Act of 1964 does not confine the actions and harms it forbids to those that are related to employment or occur at the workplace.

Court membership
- Chief Justice John Roberts Associate Justices John P. Stevens · Antonin Scalia; Anthony Kennedy · David Souter; Clarence Thomas · Ruth Bader Ginsburg; Stephen Breyer · Samuel Alito

Case opinions
- Majority: Breyer, joined by Roberts, Stevens, Scalia, Kennedy, Souter, Thomas, Ginsburg
- Concurrence: Alito (in judgment)

Laws applied
- Title VII of the Civil Rights Act of 1964; 42 U. S. C. §2000e-2(a);

Burlington Northern & Santa Fe (BNSF) Railway Co. v. White, 548 U.S. 53 (2006), is a US labor law case of the United States Supreme Court on sexual harassment and retaliatory discrimination. It was a landmark case for retaliation claims. It set a precedent for claims which could be considered retaliatory under Title VII of the Civil Rights Act of 1964. In this case the standard for retaliation against a sexual harassment complainant was revised to include any adverse employment decision or treatment that would be likely to dissuade a "reasonable worker" from making or supporting a charge of discrimination.

== Facts ==
In June 1997, Sheila White was the only woman working in the Maintenance of Way department at BNSF's Tennessee Yard in Memphis. When she applied for the job at BNSF, her previous experience operating forklifts was noted by Marvin Brown, her interviewer at BNSF. White was hired as a "track laborer", a job that involves removing and replacing track components, transporting track material, cutting brush, and clearing litter and cargo spillage from the right-of-way. Soon after White arrived on the job, she was assigned to operate the forklift. While she also performed some of the other track laborer tasks, operating the forklift was White's primary responsibility.

In September 1997, White complained to BNSF officials that her immediate supervisor, Bill Joiner, had repeatedly told her that women should not be working in the Maintenance of Way department. Joiner, White said, had also made insulting and inappropriate remarks to her in front of her male colleagues. After an internal investigation, Burlington suspended Joiner for 10 days and ordered him to attend a sexual-harassment training session.

On September 26, Brown told White about Joiner's discipline. At the same time, he told White that he was removing her from forklift duty and assigning her to perform only standard track laborer tasks. Brown explained that the reassignment reflected co-worker's complaints that, in fairness, a "more senior man" should have the "less arduous and cleaner job" of forklift operator.

On October 10, White filed a complaint with the Equal Employment Opportunity Commission (EEOC). She claimed that the reassignment of her duties amounted to unlawful gender-based discrimination and retaliation for her having earlier complained about Joiner. In early December, White filed a second retaliation charge with the commission, claiming that Brown had placed her under surveillance and was monitoring her daily activities. That charge was mailed to Brown on December 8.

A few days later, White and her immediate supervisor, Percy Sharkey, disagreed about which truck should transport White from one location to another. Some aspects of this conversation are disputed, however later that day Sharkey told Brown that White had been insubordinate. Brown immediately suspended White without pay. White invoked internal grievance procedures. Those procedures led Burlington to conclude that White had not been insubordinate. Burlington reinstated White to her position and awarded her back pay for the 37 days she was suspended. White filed an additional retaliation charge with the EEOC based on the suspension.

The anti-retaliation provision of Title VII of the Civil Rights Act of 1964 forbids employer actions that "discriminate against" an employee (or job applicant) because he has "opposed" a practice that Title VII forbids or has "made a charge, testified, assisted, or participated in" a Title VII "investigation, proceeding, or hearing". 42 U.S.C. § 2000e–3(a).

== Judgment ==
=== First Instance ===
After exhausting administrative remedies, White filed suit in federal court, where a jury rejected her claims of sex discrimination but awarded her damages of $43,000 after finding that she had been retaliated against in violation of Title VII of the Civil Rights Act of 1964.

=== Sixth Circuit ===
On appeal, BNSF argued that White had not suffered "adverse employment action," and therefore could not bring the suit, because she had not been fired, demoted, denied a promotion, or denied wages. In November 2002, a panel of the Sixth Circuit Court of Appeals initially agreed, where Judge James S. Gwin was joined by Judge Robert B. Krupansky, over the dissent of Judge Eric L. Clay. The case was reheard en banc, however, and, in April 2004, the full court found for White, holding that the suspension without pay - even if back pay was eventually awarded - was an "adverse employment action," as was the change of responsibilities within the same job category. The judges differed as to the standard they should apply in assessing such claims.

=== Supreme Court ===
One hour of oral arguments were heard on April 17, 2006, where Gregory G. Garre, the Deputy Solicitor General of the United States, appeared as a friend for the railroad.

On June 22, 2006, the Supreme Court delivered judgment unanimously in favor of Sheila White. It affirmed the decision of the Sixth Circuit, but for different reasons than those used by the lower court. Justice Stephen Breyer wrote for the majority.

Justice Alito concurred in the judgment, but disagreed with the majority's interpretation of the antiretaliation provision of Title VII, writing that "[t]he practical consequences of the test that the majority adopts strongly suggest that this test is not what Congress intended."

== Significance ==
In this case the standard for retaliation against a sexual harassment complainant was revised to include any adverse employment decision or treatment that would be likely to dissuade a "reasonable worker" from making or supporting a charge of discrimination.

== See also ==
- US labor law
- List of United States Supreme Court cases, volume 548
- List of United States Supreme Court cases
