= Lincoln Property Co. v. Roche =

- Supreme Court of the United States

Decided October 11, 2005
- Full case name: Lincoln Property Co. v. Roche
- Citations: 546 U.S. 81 (more)

Holding
- Defendants may remove an action on the basis of diversity of citizenship when there is complete diversity between all named plaintiffs and all named defendants and when no defendant is a citizen of the forum state. It is not incumbent on the named defendants to negate the existence of a potential defendant whose presence in the action would destroy diversity.

Court membership
- Chief Justice John Roberts Associate Justices John P. Stevens · Sandra Day O'Connor; Antonin Scalia · Anthony Kennedy; David Souter · Clarence Thomas; Ruth Bader Ginsburg · Stephen Breyer

Case opinion
- Majority: Ginsburg, joined by unanimous

Lincoln Property Co. v. Roche, 546 U.S. 81 (2005), was a United States Supreme Court case in which the court held that defendants may remove an action on the basis of diversity of citizenship when there is complete diversity between all named plaintiffs and all named defendants and when no defendant is a citizen of the forum state. It is not incumbent on the named defendants to negate the existence of a potential defendant whose presence in the action would destroy diversity.
