= Rice v. Collins =

- Supreme Court of the United States

Argued December 5, 2005 Decided January 18, 2006
- Full case name: Rice, Warden, et al. v. Collins
- Docket no.: 04-52
- Citations: 546 U.S. 333 (more) 126 S. Ct. 969; 163 L. Ed. 2d 824; 2006 U.S. LEXIS 913

Case history
- Prior: Superior Court of California convicted defendant; California Court of Appeal upheld conviction, People v. Collins, No. B106939 (Dec. 12, 1997); Supreme Court of California denied petition for review; United States District Court for the Central District of California dismissed with prejudice respondent's petition for a writ of habeas corpus; reversed, 348 F.3d 1082 (9th Cir. 2003); cert. granted, 545 U.S. 1151 (2005).

Holding
- Habeas corpus relief may not be granted on the basis of debatable inferences used to overturn the trial court's finding.

Court membership
- Chief Justice John Roberts Associate Justices John P. Stevens · Sandra Day O'Connor; Antonin Scalia · Anthony Kennedy; David Souter · Clarence Thomas; Ruth Bader Ginsburg · Stephen Breyer

Case opinions
- Majority: Kennedy, joined by unanimous
- Concurrence: Breyer, joined by Souter

Laws applied
- 28 U.S.C. § 2254(d)(2)

Rice v. Collins, 546 U.S. 333 (2006), was a decision by the Supreme Court of the United States regarding a prosecutor's use of a peremptory challenge to remove a young African American woman, Juror 16, from a defendant's drug trial jury in a California court case, based on her youth and on her alleged "eye rolling" in answer to a question. The defendant, Steven Martell Collins, challenged the striking of Juror 16, saying her exclusion was based on race, but the trial judge agreed that the prosecutor's reasons were race-neutral. The California Court of Appeal upheld the trial court's ruling, and the Federal District Court dismissed Collins' habeas corpus petition with prejudice. However, the Ninth Circuit Court of Appeals reversed and remanded, stating that the dismissal was unreasonable based, among other reasons, on the lack of evidence that the eye rolling had occurred.

== History ==
In Batson v. Kentucky (1986) the Supreme Court ruled that a prosecutor cannot systematically use peremptory challenges to strike jurors based on race. The court set forth a three-step process in evaluating claims of discrimination. First, the defendant must present reasons that support the contention that the prosecutor's peremptory challenges were based on race. Second, the State must produce race-neutral explanations for the peremptory challenge. Third, the trial court must determine if the peremptory challenges were based on race or on other factors. In Georgia v. McCollum (1992) the Court ruled that the three-step procedure applied equally to the defense, and in J.E.B. v. Alabama ex rel. T.B. (1994) to challenges based on gender. However the Court has always held, among other things, the ultimate burden of proving or disproving racial motivation for the strike always falls on the party challenging the strike.

== Facts of the case ==
Steven Martell Collins, an African American male, was on trial in the superior court of Los Angeles County, California, for possession of drugs with intent to distribute. Because he was a habitual criminal, he was eligible for California's Three Strikes sentencing law. During jury selection, the prosecutor removed an African American woman, Juror 16, on a peremptory challenge. When Collins contended that the juror was removed because of her race, the prosecutor listed race-neutral reasons for the challenge. These reasons included that the juror had "rolled her eyes" in response to a question, that because of her youth she may be tolerant of drugs, and that she lacked sufficient ties to the community. The trial court stated that it did not see the rolling of the eyes by Juror 16 but agreed that she was youthful, and while noting that a white male juror was also dismissed for being youthful, ruled it would give the prosecutor "the benefit of the doubt" and allow the juror strike to stand. Collins was convicted and received a 25-year sentence.

== Appeals ==
Collins appealed his case to the California Courts of Appeal claiming his rights had been violated by the trial judge in allowing jury discrimination. The Court of Appeal rejected this claim, using the precedent giving greater deference to the trial court's finding regarding claims of racial bias. After the California Supreme Court denied review, Collins filed a petition for habeas corpus in the Federal District Court. The District Court conducted a full review and found the claim was without merit.

The Ninth Circuit Court of Appeals reviewed the evidence and concluded that, since the trial court had not witnessed Juror 16's alleged "eye rolling", that the trial judge erred in accepting the prosecutor's version of the eye rolling incident. It noted that the prosecutor's credibility had been previously undermined by other erroneous statements. For example, the prosecutor said that Juror 19, another prospective African-American juror, was too youthful despite the fact that she was a grandmother and attempted to use gender as a basis for exclusion. On this basis, the court overturned Collins' conviction.

The U.S. Supreme Court granted a writ of certiorari.

== Finding ==
The Supreme Court held that the Ninth Circuit's "attempt to use a set of debatable inferences to set aside the conclusion" fails to satisfy the Antiterrorism and Effective Death Penalty Act of 1996. The Court unanimously reversed and remanded, stating "Reasonable minds reviewing the record might disagree about the prosecutor's credibility, but on habeas review that does not suffice to supersede the trial court's credibility determination."

== See also ==
- Capital Jury Project
- List of United States Supreme Court cases, volume 546
- List of United States Supreme Court cases
