= Arbaugh v. Y & H Corp. =

- Supreme Court of the United States

Argued January 11, 2006 Decided February 22, 2006
- Full case name: Jenifer Arbaugh v. Y & H Corp., dba The Moonlight Cafe
- Docket no.: 04-944
- Citations: 546 U.S. 500 (more) 126 S. Ct. 1235; 163 L. Ed. 2d 1097; 2006 U.S. LEXIS 1819; 74 U.S.L.W. 4138; 97 Fair Empl. Prac. Cas. (BNA) 737; 87 Empl. Prac. Dec. (CCH) ¶ 42,264

Case history
- Prior: Jury verdict for plaintiff, E.D. La., 2002; verdict vacated and reversed, E.D. La., 2003; affirmed, 380 F.3d 219 (5th Cir. 2004); cert. granted, 125 S. Ct. 2246 (2005)
- Subsequent: On remand, remanded, 2006 U.S. App. LEXIS 9279 (5th Cir. Apr. 13, 2006)

Holding
- The numerical threshold in Title VII of the Civil Rights Act, which limits actions to those against employers with fifteen or more employees, is not a jurisdictional requirement, but is instead a substantive requirement of a claim that a defendant cannot raise after the close of trial. Fifth Circuit Court of Appeals reversed.

Court membership
- Chief Justice John Roberts Associate Justices John P. Stevens · Antonin Scalia; Anthony Kennedy · David Souter; Clarence Thomas · Ruth Bader Ginsburg; Stephen Breyer · Samuel Alito

Case opinion
- Majority: Ginsburg, joined by Roberts, Stevens, Scalia, Kennedy, Souter, Thomas, Breyer
- Alito took no part in the consideration or decision of the case.

Laws applied
- 42 U.S.C. § 2000e et seq. (Title VII of the Civil Rights Act of 1964)

Arbaugh v. Y & H Corp., 546 U.S. 500 (2006), is a United States Supreme Court decision involving Title VII of the Civil Rights Act of 1964, which provides a private cause of action to victims of employment discrimination. The Court ruled that Title VII's "employee-numerosity requirement," which limits potential defendants to those maintaining at least fifteen employees, is not a limit on a court's jurisdiction to hear Title VII claims. The requirement is instead a substantive element of a Title VII claim, which means that a defendant must raise the issue prior to verdict or the requirement will be waived.

== Background ==
Jenifer Arbaugh was employed as a bartender and waitress at the Moonlight Cafe, a New Orleans restaurant, from May 2000 until February 2001. During this time, she alleged that she was continually sexually harassed by one of the restaurant's owners.

On November 8, 2001, Arbaugh filed suit in the United States District Court for the Eastern District of Louisiana, asserting claims against Y & H Corporation (the operator of the Moonlight Cafe) and the owner she alleged harassed her. Her complaint alleged sexual harassment in violation of Title VII, in addition to various tort claims under Louisiana state law. Arbaugh's complaint asserted that her Title VII claim invoked the court's federal question jurisdiction to hear her case.

=== District Court proceedings ===
After a two-day jury trial in October 2002, a $40,000 verdict was returned in favor of Arbaugh. Two weeks later, Y&H filed a motion to dismiss for lack of subject matter jurisdiction, asserting for the first time in the litigation that it did not qualify as an "employer" under Title VII because it did not employ fifteen or more employees for 20 or more calendar weeks during the relevant time period. If Arbaugh did not state a valid claim under Title VII, Y&H argued that she accordingly failed to invoke federal question jurisdiction.

Though the district court considered it "unfair and a waste of judicial resources" for the defendant to raise the issue after trial had already been conducted, the court nevertheless ordered both parties to conduct post-trial discovery on the issue, because objections to subject matter jurisdiction could be raised at any stage of litigation. After converting the motion to dismiss to a motion for summary judgment, the district court determined that the employer criteria were not satisfied, because Y&H's delivery drivers, owner-managers, and their shareholder wives were not "employees" for Title VII purposes, and the company could not meet the requirement without their inclusion. The court vacated its prior judgment in favor of Arbaugh, dismissed her Title VII claim with prejudice, and her state-law claims without prejudice.

=== Court of Appeals decision ===
Arbaugh appealed the reversal to the United States Court of Appeals for the Fifth Circuit, which affirmed the district court's decision. Bound by its prior decisions, the Court of Appeals held that a defendant's failure to qualify as an "employer" under Title VII deprives a district court of subject matter jurisdiction. The court ruled that dismissal for want of subject matter jurisdiction was proper because the record warranted the conclusion that Y&H did not employ the requisite 15 employees.

== Opinion of the Court ==
Arbaugh petitioned for certiorari to the U.S. Supreme Court, which granted review of the decision to resolve conflicting opinions among the Courts of Appeals on the question whether Title VII's employee-numerosity requirement was jurisdictional or simply an element of a plaintiff's claim for relief. The U.S. Solicitor General was granted permission to participate in oral argument as amicus curiae, to argue in support of Arbaugh's legal interpretation.

The Supreme Court unanimously reversed the Fifth Circuit's decision in an opinion delivered by Justice Ruth Bader Ginsburg, holding that the threshold number of employees for application of Title VII is an element of a plaintiff's claim for relief, not a jurisdictional issue.

=== Ginsburg's majority opinion ===
The Court first noted that federal question case law often erroneously conflated subject matter jurisdiction requirements with the required elements of a claim for relief. Courts often did not specify whether a case was dismissed for lack of subject matter jurisdiction or for failure to state a claim. The Supreme Court had itself in prior Title VII decisions declined to comment on whether the lower court had properly designated the plaintiff's failure to state a claim under Title VII as a failure to establish subject matter jurisdiction, preferring instead to focus on the lower court's construction of the statute.

The court described the three main consequences that followed from subject matter jurisdiction limitations, and found that these did not apply to the employee-numerosity requirement. First, because subject matter jurisdiction involves a court's power to hear a case, it can never be forfeited or waived. All courts have an independent obligation to determine whether subject-matter jurisdiction exists, even in the absence of a challenge from any party. The Court believed that nothing in the text of Title VII indicated that Congress intended courts, on their own motion, to assure that the employee-numerosity requirement was met.

Second, if subject-matter jurisdiction turns on contested facts, the trial judge may be authorized to review the evidence and resolve the dispute on her own. By contrast, if satisfaction of an essential element of a claim for relief is at issue, the jury is the proper trier of fact.

Third, when a federal court concludes that it lacks subject-matter jurisdiction, the court must dismiss the complaint in its entirety, which is why the trial court dismissed Arbaugh's state-law claims even though they had already been tried and determined by a jury. In contrast, when a court grants a motion to dismiss for failure to state a federal claim, the court generally retains discretion to exercise supplemental jurisdiction to hear the state-law claims.

The Court noted that Congress could make the employee-numerosity requirement "jurisdictional" if it wanted to, similar to how it made the "amount-in-controversy" threshold an ingredient of subject matter jurisdiction in delineating diversity jurisdiction. However, the 15-employee threshold appears in a separate provision from Title VII's jurisdictional provision, and does not speak in jurisdictional terms or refer in any way to the jurisdiction of the district courts. Given the "unfairness" and "waste of judicial resources," entailed in tying the employee-numerosity requirement to subject-matter jurisdiction, the Court considered it "the sounder course" to refrain from construing the requirement as jurisdictional. The Court concluded by stating that "when Congress does not rank a statutory limitation on coverage as jurisdictional, courts should treat the restriction as nonjurisdictional in character."
