= Arkansas Department of Human Services v. Ahlborn =

Ark. Dep't of Human Servs. v. Ahlborn
- Supreme Court of the United States

Argued February 27, 2006 Decided May 1, 2006
- Full case name: Arkansas Department of Health and Human Services, et al. v. Heidi Ahlborn
- Docket no.: 04-1506
- Citations: 547 U.S. 268 (more) 126 S. Ct. 1752; 164 L. Ed. 2d 459; 2006 U.S. LEXIS 3455; 74 U.S.L.W. 4214

Case history
- Prior: Summary judgment granted to defendants, 280 F. Supp. 2d 881 (E.D. Ark. 2003), reversed, 397 F.3d 620 (8th Cir. 2005); cert. granted, 126 S. Ct. 35 (2005)

Holding
- Under federal Medicaid law, a state cannot assert a lien on a benefit recipient's litigation settlement beyond the amount attributable to payment for past medical expenses.

Court membership
- Chief Justice John Roberts Associate Justices John P. Stevens · Antonin Scalia; Anthony Kennedy · David Souter; Clarence Thomas · Ruth Bader Ginsburg; Stephen Breyer · Samuel Alito

Case opinion
- Majority: Stevens, joined by unanimous

Laws applied
- 42 U.S.C. § 1396 (Title XIX of the Social Security Act)

Arkansas Department of Human Services v. Ahlborn, 547 U.S. 268 (2006), was a decision by the Supreme Court of the United States involving the ability of a state agency to claim a personal injury settlement as compensation for Medicaid benefits provided for treatment of the injuries. The Court ruled unanimously that a federal statutory prohibition against liens on personal property to recover Medicaid expenditures applied to settlements, so that only the portion of the settlement that represented payment for past medical expenses could be claimed by the state.

== Background of the case ==
=== Injury and settlement ===
Heidi Ahlborn, a resident of Arkansas, suffered severe and permanently disabling injuries in a car accident on January 2, 1996, and filed suit against those she believed responsible. Following her accident, Ahlborn was granted Medicaid benefits to pay for her extensive medical treatment. The Arkansas Department of Human Services (ADHS), which administers Medicaid in Arkansas with state and federal funds, intervened pursuant to Ark. Code § 20-77-310, et seq., which required anyone receiving third-party compensation for Medicaid benefits to assign those rights to the State. ADHS accordingly sought to claim a lien on any damages Ahlborn might recover from the defendants.

In 2002, an out-of-court settlement was reached, under which the defendants paid a compromised sum of $550,000 to Ahlborn. Under Arkansas law, Ahlborn's injuries gave rise to five discrete elements of damage, one of which was damages for past medical expenses. However, no effort was made to allocate by agreement or adjudication the proceeds of the compromise settlement among these elements of damage.

=== District Court proceedings ===
ADHS had not asked to participate in the settlement negotiations, nor did it seek to reopen the judgment after the case had been dismissed. However, the agency subsequently asserted a claim or lien in the amount of $219,156.78 against the settlement proceeds. Ahlborn subsequently filed a declaratory action in the U.S. District Court for the Eastern District of Arkansas against the agency and its officials, arguing that ADHS could only recover that portion of her settlement representing payment for past medical expenses.

The parties characterized the sole issue in the case as one of statutory construction. Federal Medicaid statutes provided for the assignment of rights to third-party payments, but prohibited the placing of a lien on a Medicaid recipient's property. Ahlborn argued that the settlement was her "property," and that this prohibition accordingly limited the State's recovery to only those portions of the payments made for medical expenses. The parties stipulated that the State would recover $215,645.30 if it prevailed on the statutory construction issue, representing the total amount the State paid in relation to Ahlborn's care, but only $35,581.47 if Ahlborn prevailed, representing 16.5 percent of the total, which was considered a fair representation of the percentage of the settlement constituting payment by the defendants for past medical care.

The parties filed cross-motions for summary judgment, and the district court granted the State's motion. The court interpreted the relevant federal statutory provisions to mean that the State may recover from Ahlborn's settlement the sum stipulated as the total amount of Medicaid benefits paid to her, regardless of whether the settlement funds represented payments for the cost of medical services.

=== Court of Appeal's decision ===
On appeal, the Eighth Circuit Court of Appeals reversed. The court supported Ahlborn's interpretation of "property" in the Medicaid lien-prohibition provision as extending to the right to a settlement. It observed that the Arkansas assignment statute contemplates that the lien arises only after the injured party receives the settlement, and the court believed that the State could not circumvent this by requiring the assignment of rights before the settlement was liquidated and actually received as personal property.

== The court's decision ==
The U.S. Supreme Court unanimously affirmed the Eighth Circuit's ruling in a decision delivered by Justice John Paul Stevens. The Court held that federal Medicaid law did not authorize ADHS to assert a lien on Ahlborn's settlement in excess of the stipulated amount for past medical expenses, and that the federal anti-lien provision furthermore affirmatively prohibited it from doing so. The state has no claim against those portions of a settlement the parties agreed were attributable to pain and suffering or lost wages, the high court ruled. The Arkansas statutes were therefore unenforceable to the extent they provided for a contrary result.

The opinion is also significant because the Court, without discussion, permitted a Medicaid suit to proceed where the cause of action was conferred by the Supremacy Clause. Most federal suits alleging violation of the Medicaid Act – which does not expressly confer a right of action – claim that the right of action is authorized by 42 U.S.C. § 1983. In recent years, the Supreme Court has made it more difficult to sue under § 1983 for statutory violations, requiring that the statutory provision in question unmistakably focus on individual rights. While some Medicaid suits have been permitted under § 1983, certain Medicaid provisions have been held unenforceable.

However, this case shows an alternative route to federal court for public interest litigants. Where a state statute or regulation conflicts with or is preempted by federal law, the right of action arguably is conferred by the Supremacy Clause of the U.S. Constitution. Ahlborn implicitly supports this premise.

== See also ==
- Sereboff v. Mid Atlantic Medical Services, Inc., 547 U.S. 356 (2006), a case decided the same term involving the ability of an ERISA plan fiduciary to recover medical costs from a personal injury settlement
- Wos v. E.M.A.
