= Lockhart v. United States (2005) =

- Supreme Court of the United States

Argued November 2, 2005 Decided December 7, 2005
- Full case name: James Lockhart v. United States
- Citations: 546 U.S. 142 (more) 126 S. Ct. 699; 163 L. Ed. 2d 557

Case history
- Prior: 376 F.3d 1027 (9th Cir. 2004); cert. granted, 544 U.S. 998 (2005).

Holding
- The government can offset Social Security benefits to collect on student loan debt that is over 10 years old.

Court membership
- Chief Justice John Roberts Associate Justices John P. Stevens · Sandra Day O'Connor; Antonin Scalia · Anthony Kennedy; David Souter · Clarence Thomas; Ruth Bader Ginsburg · Stephen Breyer

Case opinions
- Majority: O'Connor, joined by unanimous
- Concurrence: Scalia

Lockhart v. United States, 546 U.S. 142 (2005), is a United States Supreme Court decision concerning whether the United States government can offset Social Security benefits to collect on student loan debt over 10 years old. In a unanimous decision, the Court affirmed the lower court's decision that allowed the offset by the government.

== Background ==
=== Legal history ===
The Debt Collection Act of 1982 allows the federal government to collect on debt by offsetting administrative payments. Social Security benefits are not exempt but have specific limitations as set forth in 42 USC §407, which states:

[N]one of the moneys paid or payable or rights existing under this subchapter shall be subject to execution, levy, attachment, garnishment, or other legal process, or to the operation of any bankruptcy or insolvency law. No other provision of law, enacted before, on, or after April 20, 1983, may be construed to limit, supersede, or otherwise modify the provisions of this section except to the extent that it does so by express reference to this section.

However, debts older than 10 years old are generally protected from collection under the 1982 Debt Collection Act. This prohibition was revised under the Higher Education Technical Amendments, which specifically eliminated time restriction on the collection of a number of loan types, including student loans. This, however, did not apply to the offset of Social Security benefits as it did not specifically amend that act. The Debt Collection Act of 1996 made specific reference to 42 USC §407 in stating that "all payment due an individual under ... the Social Security Act ... shall be subject to offset under this section."

=== Facts of the case ===
James Lockhart received $874 per month in Social Security payments and $10 per month in food stamps. At 67 years old, this was his only source of income, which he used for necessities such as food, housing, and medication. He had been unemployed since 1981 (save a few months of employment in 1987), and, to try to improve his chances of getting a job, Lockhart began attending various higher educational institutions from 1984 to 1990. Between 1984 and 1989, Lockhart incurred student loans which were reinsured by the federal government under the Guaranteed Student Loan Program. After failing to repay his loans, they were reassigned to the Department of Education and, through the Treasury Offset Program, were certified to the Department of the Treasury.

In April 2002, the government notified Lockhart that a portion of his Social Security benefits would be withheld in order to collect on his delinquent debt. The initial offset was $93 but, after an increase in benefits, the offset was raised reaching a maximum of $143.10. Some of the loans being collected on were over 10 years delinquent. Lockhart brought suit which was dismissed and judged in favor of the United States. Lockhart appealed. The Court of Appeals for the Ninth Circuit held that the offset is not subject to the statute of limitations in 31 USC §3716(e)(1), and affirmed the lower court's judgement against Lockhart. The Supreme Court granted certiorari to resolve a circuit split between the Eighth and Ninth Circuits.

At oral arguments, Lockhart, represented by Brian Wolfman, advanced the argument that the government lacks the authority to offset benefits for loans over 10 years delinquent. They argued that when a law overrides the Social Security Act's ban on offsets by explicit reference to 42 USC §407, the authority extends only as far as that granted in the statute with the express reference. As such, they argue, "the Debt Collection Act [of 1996], the statute that contains that express reference, prohibits offsets to collect claims that have been outstanding for more than 10 years." Justice Scalia raised the issue of whether the "magic words" required by §407 can nullify the intent of a later Congress if they had a clear intent to overrule the statute but did not use the required phrase. Respondents, represented by Lisa Blatt, argued that the text of Higher Education Technical Amendment in 1991 was unqualified and affected laws before and after its passage. They further argued that the 1996 Debt Collection Act had no impact on the limitations on debt collection saying that,

All that happened was that Congress, in essence, put Social Security benefits on par, equal footing, with all other Federal payments .... the [Higher Education Technical Amendment] applies unless it's been repealed. And there's just nothing in the Debt Collection Act that comes close to repealing the [Higher Education Technical Amendment], because it doesn't address the subject of student loans.

== Opinion of the Court ==
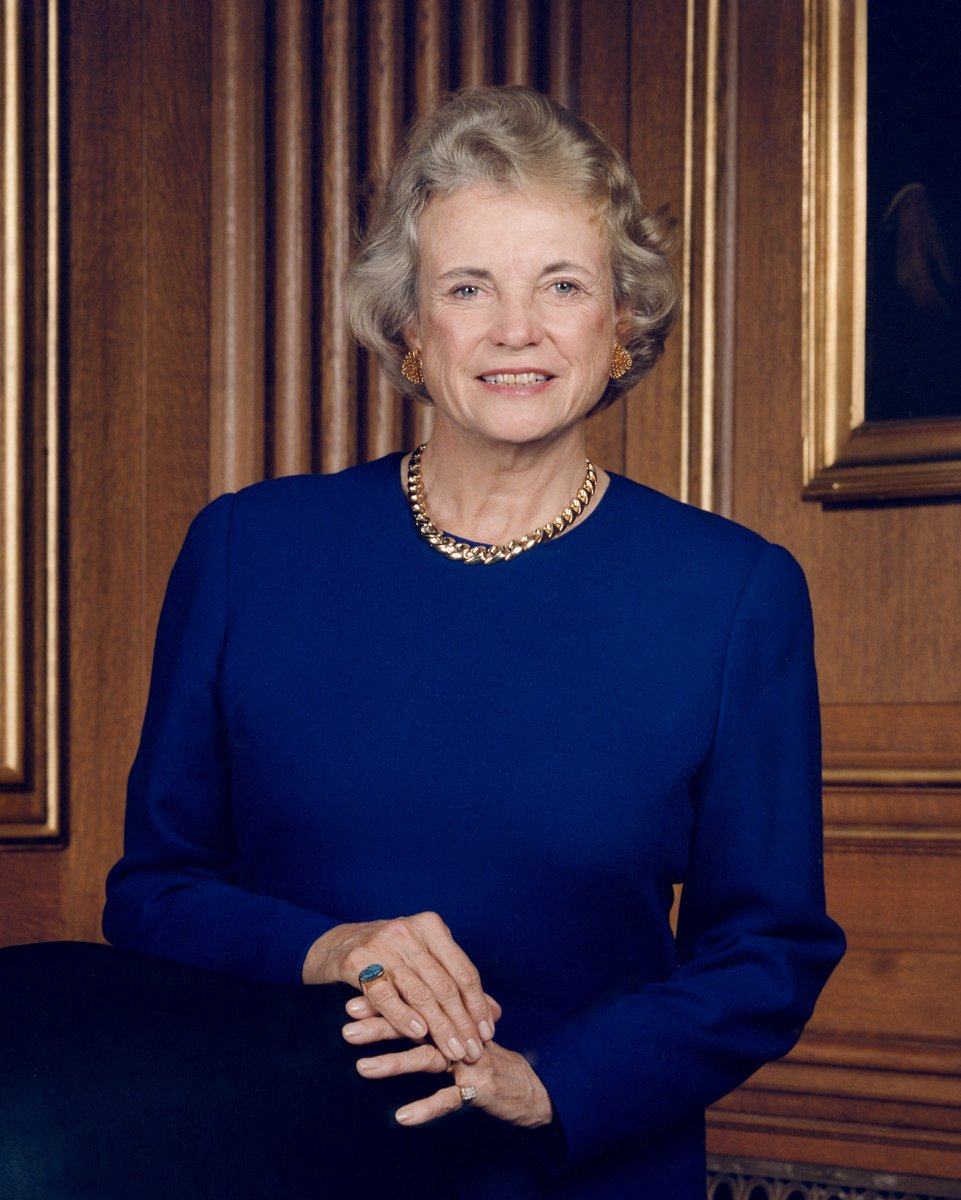
Justice O'Connor delivered the opinion for a unanimous Court.

In a unanimous decision delivered by Justice Sandra Day O'Connor, the Court held that the government can offset Social Security benefits to collect on loans delinquent for more than 10 years. The Court did not rule on the issue of "express-reference provisions" like that in §407 as it was satisfied by the Debt Collection Act of 1996. However the Court did hold that the Higher Education Technical Amendment need not have a specific reference to §407 as §407(b) only requires a reference to authorize attachment in the first place, which the Debt Collection Act of 1996 did. While Lockhart argued that the Higher Education Technical Amendment only applied to previous statutes, the Court, citing Union Bank v. Wolas, rejected that argument "The fact that Congress may not have foreseen all of the consequences of a statutory enactment is not a sufficient reason for refusing to give effect to its plain meaning."

=== Scalia's concurrence ===
Justice Scalia filed a concurring opinion in which he argued that the express-reference provision of §407 is not binding. Scalia, citing a number of decisions, argued that "[o]ne legislature ... cannot abridge the powers of a succeeding legislature." Following that premise, he contended that an act with an express-reference provision can be overruled by implicit reference without regard for the express-reference provision as long as the legislative intent is clear. Because of this, he argued that the Higher Education Technical Amendment and the Debt Collection Act of 1996 unambiguously contradict and thus repealed §407 and is effective even if the express-reference provision is not fulfilled.

== See also ==
- List of United States Supreme Court cases, volume 546
- List of United States Supreme Court cases
- Lists of United States Supreme Court cases by volume
- List of United States Supreme Court cases by the Roberts Court
