= Buckeye Check Cashing, Inc. v. Cardegna =

- Supreme Court of the United States

Argued November 29, 2005 Decided February 21, 2006
- Full case name: Buckeye Check Cashing, Inc., petitioner v. John Cardegna et al.
- Citations: 546 U.S. 440 (more) 126 S. Ct. 1204; 163 L. Ed. 2d 1038; 2006 U.S. LEXIS 1814

Case history
- Prior: Petitioner's motion to compel arbitration denied in Florida trial court; reversed on appeal, 824 So. 2d 228 (Fla. Dist. Ct. App. 2002); appeals court decision reversed, 894 So. 2d 860 (Fla. 2005); cert. granted, 545 U.S. 1127 (2005).
- Subsequent: On remand, 930 So. 2d 610 (Fla. 2006).

Holding
- Where contract contains arbitration clause, arbitrator alone can rule on legality of contract under state law in first instance unless clause itself is challenged, distinguishing between void and voidable. Florida Supreme Court reversed and remanded

Court membership
- Chief Justice John Roberts Associate Justices John P. Stevens · Antonin Scalia; Anthony Kennedy · David Souter; Clarence Thomas · Ruth Bader Ginsburg; Stephen Breyer · Samuel Alito

Case opinions
- Majority: Scalia, joined by Roberts, Stevens, Kennedy, Souter, Ginsburg, Breyer
- Dissent: Thomas
- Alito took no part in the consideration or decision of the case.

Laws applied
- Federal Arbitration Act, 9 U.S.C. §§ 1–4

Buckeye Check Cashing, Inc. v. Cardegna, 546 U.S. 440 (2006), is a United States Supreme Court case concerning contract law and arbitration. The case arose from a class action filed in Florida against a payday lender alleging the loan agreements the plaintiffs had signed were unenforceable because they essentially charged a higher interest rate than that permitted under Florida law.

The lending agreements called for all disputes between the borrower and lender to be settled in arbitration. The original plaintiffs argued that the entire contract, including the arbitration clause, was invalid because it violated the law. When it was appealed to the High Court, Justice Antonin Scalia wrote for a majority of seven that the Federal Arbitration Act, as previously interpreted by the Court, settled a question that had long been debated by legal scholars and lower-court judges. The opinion distinguished void and voidable contracts, requiring that in the latter an arbitrator rule on all issues including the legality of the contract unless the arbitration clause was itself challenged. The only dissenter was Clarence Thomas, who restated his belief that the Arbitration Act does not supersede state law.

== Background of the case ==
In 1978, the court's Marquette Bank decision, which held that under the National Banking Act of 1863 states could not enforce their anti-usury laws against nationally chartered banks based in other states, opened the door to increased credit card spending by Americans. Other forms of consumer credit, such as title and payday loans, became available for those who could not get even the most restrictive credit cards available. Social activists criticized the banks and companies that engaged in those practices, calling them predatory lenders who targeted the poor with promises of no credit check and easy money that only came at extremely high interest rates, profiting when the loans were extended long beyond the original short term.

Most such lenders had their customers sign credit agreements that included arbitration clauses specifying that all disputes were to be resolved through that process rather than litigation. Arbitration in turn was criticized as a business-friendly forum which furthered the exploitation of consumers most in need of money. Lawsuits over these contracts, however, were increasingly dismissed by lower courts that followed the Supreme Court's Prima Paint Corp. v. Flood & Conklin Mfg. Co. case, which created the separability doctrine, under which all issues in contracts with arbitration clauses, save the clause itself, were to be decided by the arbitrator and not a court, under the 1925 Federal Arbitration Act. In Southland Corp. v. Keating, the Court held the FAA, and thus the separability doctrine, applicable to contracts executed under state law as well.

== Litigation history ==
In 1999, John Cardegna, a Palm Beach County 9-1-1 operator, took out a $337.50 payday loan from a local branch of The Check Cashing Store, a subsidiary of Buckeye Check Cashing, Inc., a Dublin, Ohio-based company (now Checksmart). Later he took out another loan, for $150. Unable to repay either from his paychecks, he kept rolling over his loan by paying the fee to do so. Eventually these came to over $1,000, and with the help of an activist lawyers' group, Trial Lawyers for Public Justice (TLPJ), he filed a class action alleging that the fees he was charged were effectively interest payments at a 1,300% annual rate, well over Florida's legal limit of 45%. The class would eventually be certified to include all the store's customers prior to September 30, 2001, reflecting a change in Florida law which allowed the fees.

The company moved to have the case dismissed and compel arbitration. When that was denied, it petitioned the Florida Fourth District Court of Appeal which ruled that arbitration was required because the entire contract had been challenged, not the severable arbitration clause. But then that decision was appealed to the Florida Supreme Court, which reversed on the grounds that the contract was illegal ab initio and thus the arbitration clause was unenforceable. It read Prima Paint to distinguish between void contracts that could never have legal standing, such as the one at issue, and voidable contracts where that result could come to pass later as a result of dispute resolution but where the contract was legal on its face. One justice of that court, Raoul Cantero, dissented, saying that the majority was ignoring the actual language of the FAA.

Buckeye petitioned the Supreme Court for certiorari, and it was granted in 2005. Since several of the appeals circuits had ruled in favor of arbitration in similar cases, but the Alabama Supreme Court had agreed with its Florida counterpart, the case was closely watched by the arbitration industry and consumer advocates.

== Before the Court ==
=== Briefs ===
Christopher Landau of the Washington firm Kirkland & Ellis, a former clerk to justices Antonin Scalia and Clarence Thomas, argued for Buckeye Check; Paul Bland of TLPJ represented Cardegna. Many banking and business groups filed amici briefs on the company's behalf.

Landau's brief reiterated much of the argument Florida's Justice Cantero had made in his dissent: that it did not matter whether the claim was that the contract had been fraudulently induced as in Prima Paint or that it was illegal on its face, as it was here. "Whether the underlying contract is good, bad or indifferent is of no legitimate concern to the court," he wrote. "If the parties agreed to arbitrate their dispute, and do not challenge either the arbitration agreement itself or their assent to the underlying contract, that is the end of the matter as far as the court is concerned." Otherwise, arbitration clauses were pointless as anyone could avoid them by filing a suit challenging the contract. Bland argued that an illegal contract cannot exist, much less be enforced in any way:

Under generally applicable principles of Florida law – and that of most other jurisdictions – an agreement to perform a criminal act does not form a contract. There may be an agreement to sell cocaine, for example, but there is no such thing under Florida law as a "contract" to sell cocaine (much less an enforceable arbitration provision in a "contract" to sell cocaine). That principle governs this case.

He also reminded the justices of the heavy presumption against pre-empting state law, particularly in the area of contract formation, and that Prima Paint did not apply to the sections of the FAA under issue.

In a reply brief Landau insisted again that the court's previous jurisprudence made it quite clear that the arbitration clause could only be negated if separately challenged. He accused the respondents of having a covert agenda to overturn the controlling cases. "The reason that Prima Paint and Southland have stood the test of time is no mystery: those decisions are eminently sensible.", he concluded.

Another amicus brief was filed by Theis Research, a California company with a certiorari petition then before the Court in a similar case it had brought against a law firm that had failed to disclose a potential conflict of interest prior to patent litigation in which it represented Theis. While differing on some procedural points with Bland's brief, Theis lawyer Paul Johnson likewise urged the court to rule in Cardegna's favor lest the Arbitration Act become "a Trojan Horse to assault the citadel of police powers vested in the states".

=== Oral argument ===
At oral argument, Justices Sandra Day O'Connor (one of two dissenters in Southland) and John Roberts seemed receptive to Bland's argument that no clause of a contract illegal under state law, including an arbitration clause, can be enforced. "The state itself makes a decision that certain contracts can't be entered into", O'Connor said. Ruth Bader Ginsburg likewise was not convinced that Prima Paint, which had arisen from a suit filed in federal court, applied to states as well. Roberts and John Paul Stevens also saw the potential for conflict of interest in an arbitrator ruling on the legality of the contract. "The arbitrator always has an interest in finding that the contract is valid and arbitrable because that's his source of business — arbitrating disputes", said the latter.

On the other side, Anthony Kennedy felt that Prima Paint and subsequent decisions had "certainly displaced the states and state law from this area [to] a very substantial extent". It was up to the Court to resolve confusion similar to that created in the instant case, he added. Antonin Scalia worried that ruling in Cardegna's favor would open the floodgates of litigation. "All you have to do is open the door and you will have litigation in court," Ginsburg agreed, "and then the court will decide what the arbitrator would otherwise decide."

== Decision ==
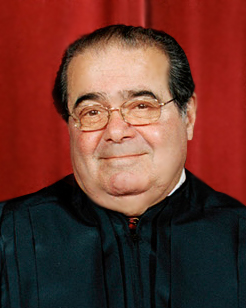
Antonin Scalia

Less than two months after oral argument, the justices ruled 7-1 for Buckeye. O'Connor had retired and been replaced by Samuel Alito, who as he had not seated for oral argument took no part in the decision.

Antonin Scalia wrote for the majority. The Florida Supreme Court's distinction between void and voidable contracts was, as Cantero had said, irrelevant under Prima Paint and Southland. The relevant section of the FAA was indeed applicable to the case, he said, since it required that contracts with arbitration clauses be treated like all others, and that its definition of "contract" included those that would or could later be voided since it explicitly mentioned such contracts that might later be revoked.

Clarence Thomas was the lone dissenter. He wrote a single paragraph citing his three earlier dissents in similar cases and restated his belief that the FAA does not pre-empt state law.

== Aftermath ==
After the case was remanded to the Florida courts in which it had originated, the parties eventually settled. In 2008 the company agreed to pay $7 million into a fund. Of that amount, $2.1 million went to pay the plaintiffs' lawyers. The members of the class, potentially 70,000 in number, divided the rest.

== Legacy ==
The case established a precedent and was seen as expanding the scope of earlier court rulings applying the FAA to the states. The Court itself relied on it in a later opinion, and legal scholars have discussed its impact and implications.

=== Subsequent jurisprudence ===
Two years later, the Court heard Preston v. Ferrer, the case brought by the former manager of Alex Ferrer (television's Judge Alex) against him. Ferrer had moved to bypass arbitration, arguing both that Preston was not licensed by California to work as a talent agent and thus could not legally contract with him for such services, and that that state's Talent Agencies Act required that all such disputes be considered by the state labor commissioner's office first. He argued that this distinguished the case from Buckeye Check.

This time it was Justice Ginsburg who wrote for the 8-1 majority that the FAA compelled arbitration even when state law vested dispute resolution authority in a specific state regulatory body. Again, Thomas wrote a short dissent reiterating his position and this time including Buckeye Check among his prior opinions to this effect.

=== Criticism and commentary ===
Proponents of arbitration and other means of alternative dispute resolution have seen in the decision a reassuring reaffirmation of the separability principle that cleared up whether it covered a challenge to the legality of the underlying contract. "While seemingly a mere reiteration of Prima Paint's holding," the International Institute for Conflict Prevention and Resolution (IICPR) wrote, "the Buckeye decision both clarifies and expands an arbitrator's jurisdiction by adding potentially void contracts to an arbitrator’s domain and by unequivocally extending the severability and validity principles into state court." The decision left open the question of whether it was still for the courts to decide if a contract had been properly formed, however, and some lower courts had denied motions to compel arbitration when that was the issue. Lawyers from the international arbitration department at White & Case praised the decision for making U.S. law "consistent with current international arbitration case law and doctrine", under which separability has a stronger foundation than it does in the U.S. "[It] avoids damage to the reputation of the United States as a 'safe' host of international arbitration."

Those who approached from a consumer-rights standpoint were not as solicitous. Texas arbitration expert Alan Scott Rau called Scalia's phrasing "sloppy and unguarded", noting it failed to recognize that some challenges to a contract that the law reserves for courts, such as capacity and forgery, necessarily include the arbitration clause. Stephen Ware of Kansas calls on Congress to repeal the separability doctrine and require that courts be permitted to compel arbitration only after they have heard and rejected any challenges to the validity of the contract itself: "The separability doctrine separates arbitration law from an important part of contract law — the defenses to enforcement — and thus fails to provide the right to litigate with the protection of those defenses."

"[T]he Buckeye decision forces the lower courts to either continue the search for a workable rule or accept the undermining of the moral foundations of contract law," says Timothy Hall of the University of Louisville's Louis D. Brandeis School of Law. "Scalia’s opinion in Buckeye is an astonishing attempt to ... [institute] ... an explicit federal policy imposing arbitration and rejecting judicial resolution of many legal issues." He, too, notes the fundamental contradiction posed by allowing defenses to contract formation to remain adjudicable by courts. Before and after the decision, most state court cases he looked at challenging contracts on those defenses have been very receptive to arguments, particular unconscionability.

The upshot of all this may be that the Court, in attempting to simplify the issue by sending more claims to arbitration, has in fact complicated things by requiring an analysis of the nature of the contract defense alleged, instead of simply hearing the contract defense claim and, if invalid, then sending the underlying claim to arbitration.

He suggests ways both legislative and judicial bodies could remedy this situation.

== See also ==
- List of United States Supreme Court cases, volume 546
- List of United States Supreme Court cases
