= Volvo Trucks North America, Inc. v. Reeder-Simco GMC, Inc. =

- Supreme Court of the United States

Decided January 10, 2006
- Full case name: Volvo Trucks North America, Inc. v. Reeder-Simco GMC, Inc.
- Citations: 546 U.S. 164 (more)

Holding
- A manufacturer may not be held liable for secondary-line price discrimination under the Robinson-Patman Act in the absence of a showing that the manufacturer discriminated between dealers competing to resell its product to the same retail customer.

Court membership
- Chief Justice John Roberts Associate Justices John P. Stevens · Sandra Day O'Connor; Antonin Scalia · Anthony Kennedy; David Souter · Clarence Thomas; Ruth Bader Ginsburg · Stephen Breyer

Case opinions
- Majority: Ginsburg, joined by Roberts, O’Connor, Scalia, Kennedy, Souter, Breyer
- Dissent: Stevens, joined by Thomas

Volvo Trucks North America, Inc. v. Reeder-Simco GMC, Inc., 546 U.S. 164 (2006), was a United States Supreme Court case in which the court held that a manufacturer may not be held liable for secondary-line price discrimination under the Robinson-Patman Act in the absence of a showing that the manufacturer discriminated between dealers competing to resell its product to the same retail customer.
