= List of United States Supreme Court cases, volume 546 =

This is a list of all the United States Supreme Court cases from volume 546 of the United States Reports:

Case name	Citation	Date decided
Dye v. Hofbauer	546 U.S. 1	2005
Schriro v. Smith	546 U.S. 6	2005
Kane v. Garcia Espitia	546 U.S. 9	2005
Eberhart v. United States	546 U.S. 12	2005
IBP, Inc. v. Alvarez	546 U.S. 21	2005
Time that workers spend walking between changing and production areas is compensable under the FLSA.
United States v. Olson	546 U.S. 43	2005
Under the Federal Tort Claims Act, the United States waives sovereign immunity only where local law would make a "private person" liable in tort, not where local law would make "a state or municipal entity" liable.
Schaffer v. Weast	546 U.S. 49	2005
Maryland v. Blake	546 U.S. 72	2005
Dismissed as improvidently granted.
Bradshaw v. Richey	546 U.S. 74	2005
Lincoln Property Co. v. Roche	546 U.S. 81	2005
Defendants may remove an action on the basis of diversity of citizenship if there is complete diversity between all named plaintiffs and all named defendants, and no defendant is a citizen of the forum State. It is not incumbent on the named defendants to negate the existence of a potential defendant whose presence in the action would destroy diversity.
Wagnon v. Prairie Band Potawatomi Nation	546 U.S. 95	2005
Martin v. Franklin Capital Corp.	546 U.S. 132	2005
Absent unusual circumstances, attorney’s fees should not be awarded under §1447(c) when the removing party has an objectively reasonable basis for removal. Conversely, where no objectively reasonable basis exists, fees should be awarded.
Lockhart v. United States	546 U.S. 142	2005
United States v. Georgia	546 U.S. 151	January 10, 2006
Volvo Trucks N. Am., Inc. v. Reeder-Simco GMC, Inc.	546 U.S. 164	2006
A manufacturer may not be held liable for secondary-line price discrimination under the Robinson-Patman Act in the absence of a showing that the manufacturer discriminated between dealers competing to resell its product to the same retail customer.
Evans v. Chavis	546 U.S. 189	2006
Brown v. Sanders	546 U.S. 212	2006
Gonzales v. Oregon	546 U.S. 243	2006
Wachovia Bank, N.A. v. Schmidt	546 U.S. 303	2006
A national bank, for 28 U.S.C. §1348 purposes, is a citizen of the State in which its main office, as set forth in its articles of association, is located.
Ayotte v. Planned Parenthood	546 U.S. 320	2006
Rice v. Collins	546 U.S. 333	2006
Will v. Hallock	546 U.S. 345	2006
Central Va. Community Coll. v. Katz	546 U.S. 356	2006
A bankruptcy trustee’s proceeding to set aside the debtor’s preferential transfers to state agencies is not barred by sovereign immunity.
Unitherm Food Systems, Inc. v. Swift-Eckrich, Inc.	546 U.S. 394	2006
Wis. Right to Life, Inc. v. FEC	546 U.S. 410	2006
Alaska v. United States	546 U.S. 413	2006
Gonzales v. O Centro Espírita Beneficente União	546 U.S. 418	2006
Buckeye Check Cashing, Inc. v. Cardegna	546 U.S. 440	2006
Republic of Iran v. Elahi	546 U.S. 450	2006
Ash v. Tyson Foods, Inc.	546 U.S. 454	2006
Lance v. Dennis	546 U.S. 459	2006
Domino's Pizza, Inc. v. McDonald	546 U.S. 470	2006
Dolan v. Postal Serv.	546 U.S. 481	2006
Arbaugh v. Y & H Corp.	546 U.S. 500	2006
Oregon v. Guzek	546 U.S. 517	2006
