= Day v. McDonough =

- Supreme Court of the United States

Argued February 27, 2006 Decided April 25, 2006
- Full case name: Patrick A. Day v. James R. McDonough, Interim Secretary, Florida Department of Corrections
- Docket no.: 04-1324
- Citations: 547 U.S. 198 (more) 126 S. Ct. 1675; 164 L. Ed. 2d 376; 2006 U.S. LEXIS 3448

Case history
- Prior: Petition dismissed, sub nom., Day v. Crosby, N.D. Fla; affirmed, 391 F.3d 1192 (11th Cir. 2004); cert. granted, 545 U.S. 1164 (2005).

Holding
- A state's unintentional failure to object to the filing of a habeas corpus petition after the statute of limitations expired does not prevent a district court from dismissing the petition on its own initiative.

Court membership
- Chief Justice John Roberts Associate Justices John P. Stevens · Antonin Scalia; Anthony Kennedy · David Souter; Clarence Thomas · Ruth Bader Ginsburg; Stephen Breyer · Samuel Alito

Case opinions
- Majority: Ginsburg, joined by Roberts, Kennedy, Souter, Alito
- Dissent: Stevens, joined by Breyer
- Dissent: Scalia, joined by Thomas, Breyer

Laws applied
- 28 U.S.C. § 2244(d); Fed. R. Civ. P. 8, 81; Rules Governing Section 2254 Cases in the United States District Courts 4, 5

Day v. McDonough, 547 U.S. 198 (2006), is a US Supreme Court case involving the one-year statute of limitations for filing habeas corpus petitions that was established by the Antiterrorism and Effective Death Penalty Act of 1996 (AEDPA). In a 5–4 decision, the court held that, when the government unintentionally failed to object to the filing of a petition after the AEDPA limitations period has expired, it is not an abuse of discretion for a district court to dismiss sua sponte (on its own initiative) the petition on that basis.

== Background ==
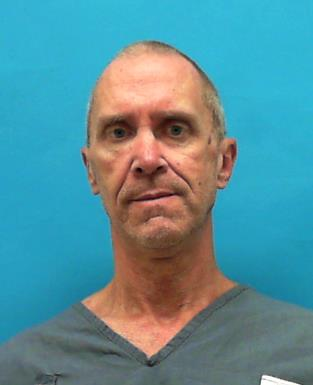
Mugshot of Patrick Day

On September 3, 1998, Patrick Day was convicted of second-degree murder in Florida state court and sentenced to imprisonment for 55 years. After the Florida First District Court of Appeals affirmed Day's conviction and sentence, the Antiterrorism and Effective Death Penalty Act (AEDPA) 365-day statute of limitations for Day to obtain federal habeas corpus relief began to run on March 20, 2000. On March 9, 2001, Day filed a post-conviction petition under Florida state procedure, which tolled the limitation period for filing a habeas petition until December 3, 2002, when the First District Court of Appeals issued its mandate denying Day collateral relief. By then, Day had used 353 of his allotted 365 days and accordingly had until December 16, 2002 to file a federal habeas petition.

However, Day did not file his petition until January 8, 2003, after the limitations period had run. A US magistrate judge nevertheless acknowledged that the petition was "in proper form" and ordered Florida to file an answer and to make all arguments regarding Day's potential failure to exhaust state remedies or procedural default. The order stated that those arguments would be waived if not addressed in the answer, but it did not expressly mention the statute of limitations. The answer of the State of Florida erroneously asserted that Day's petition was timely filed after "352 days of untolled time" and then addressed Day's substantive arguments.

In December 2003, the court sua sponte issued an order to show cause why Day's petition should not be dismissed as untimely. Day made three arguments against dismissal. Firstly, Day argued that the court should not dismiss his complaint after it had been pending for nearly a year without any suggestion that it was untimely. Secondly, Day argued that he had 90 days from the denial of his motion for rehearing on collateral appeal to file a petition for a writ of certiorari to the U.S. Supreme Court. Under his calculation, the limitation period for filing his federal habeas petition did not run until 90 days after November 15, 2002. Thirdly, Day argued that the state public defenders had withheld his trial transcript for 352 days and the delay had cost him time in which he could have worked toward filing his appeals.

The magistrate judge recommended dismissal of Day's habeas petition. In his objection to the report and recommendation of the magistrate judge, Day argued for the first time that the concession of timeliness by the state was dispositive because it was a forfeiture of that defense. The district court instead adopted the magistrate judge's report and dismissed Day's petition.

The United States Court of Appeals for the Eleventh Circuit granted a certificate of appealability only regarding Day's forfeiture argument and affirmed it in a per curiam decision. The court had ruled on the issue to uphold the ability of a trial court to review sua sponte the timeliness of a petition. The court also believed that Florida's concession of timeliness was "patently erroneous."

== Decision ==
The Court affirmed the decision of the Eleventh Circuit in a 5–4 ruling. Justice Ruth Bader Ginsburg delivered the opinion for the majority in holding that district courts are permitted but not obliged to consider sua sponte the timeliness of a state prisoner's habeas corpus petition. Based on precedent involving other affirmative defenses to habeas petitions and the perceived lack of difference between outright dismissal by the district court and dismissal after allowing the State to amend its answer to include the limitations defense, the Court did not consider the district court's dismissal of Day's petition to be an abuse of discretion. Justices John Paul Stevens and Antonin Scalia filed dissenting opinions.

=== Majority opinion ===
The Court grouped the statute of limitations defense with other non-jurisdictional affirmative defenses to a habeas corpus petition such as exhaustion of remedies, which the Court had ruled in Granberry v. Greer, 481 U.S. 129 (1987) federal appellate courts may address sua sponte although the issue not had been raised at the district court level. There was similar precedent involving the non-retroactivity rule and procedural default. The Court noted that the statute of limitations is expressly grouped with those other defenses under the current version of Rule 5(b) of the Rules Governing Section 2254 Cases in the United States District Courts (simply known as the Habeas Rules), which provides that the State's answer to a habeas petition "must state whether any claim in the petition is barred by a failure to exhaust state remedies, a procedural bar, non-retroactivity, or a statute of limitations."

Day's argument was characterized by the Court as relying primarily on Habeas Rule 4, which requires district courts to "promptly examine" petitions and dismiss "if it plainly appears... that the petitioner is not entitled to relief." Day argued that this limited a court's ability to raise AEDPA's limitation sua sponte to the pre-answer, initial screening stage, and that after that point, the Federal Rules of Civil Procedure governed the proceedings. Under Fed. R. Civ. P. 8(c), the statute of limitations defense is forfeited if it is not asserted in its answer, or an amendment thereto, just as the State of Florida failed to do. However, the Court believed that were it to accept Day's position, courts would rarely be positioned to raise AEDPA's time bar sua sponte because information essential to the time calculation is often absent until the State has filed, along with its answer, copies of documents from the state-court proceedings, as was the case in Day's proceedings.

The Court instead agreed with the State of Florida, which argued that "[t]he considerations of comity, finality, and the expeditious handling of habeas proceedings that motivated AEDPA...counsel against an excessively rigid or formal approach to the affirmative defenses" such as the statute of limitations. The State argued that Granberry was instructive in establishing that courts instead have the discretion in each case to decide "whether the administration of justice" would be better served by reaching the merits of the petition or dismissing it because of the statute of limitations, and a petition should not be deemed timely simply because a government attorney miscounted the days. The Court observed that the State could have simply amended its answer had the Magistrate Judge informed it of its computation error rather than acting sua sponte. "Recognizing that an amendment to the State's answer might have obviated this controversy," the Court wrote, "we see no dispositive difference between that route, and the one taken here."

The Court concluded by emphasizing the need for the parties to receive fair notice and an opportunity to be heard before a court acts on its own initiative. Courts must also ensure that the petitioner is not significantly prejudiced by the delayed focus on the limitation issue, and "determine whether the interests of justice would be better served" by addressing the merits or by dismissing the petition as time barred. The Court also stated that a district court would not have the discretion to disregard the choice of a defendant to intelligently waive the limitations defense. In that case, however, the Court believed the Magistrate Judge gave Day due notice and a fair opportunity to show why the limitation period should not yield dismissal of the petition, and there was nothing to suggest that the State "strategically" withheld the defense or chose to relinquish it. The record instead indicated that the miscalculation was "merely an inadvertent error."

=== Stevens' dissent ===
Justice Stevens, though believing the case was rightly decided, dissented from the Court's decision to announce its judgment when a relevant case would be decided later in the term. Justice Breyer, who believed the case was wrongly decided, also joined in Stevens' dissent on this issue.

The Court had recently granted certiorari in Lawrence v. Florida, a case which would answer the question of whether Day's petition was actually barred by the statute of limitations. Stevens wrote, "It seems improvident to affirm a possibly erroneous Court of Appeals judgment that dismissed Day's habeas petition without an evaluation of its merits when we have already granted certiorari to address the issue on which the Court of Appeals may have erred." He suggested that the lower court may still avoid a "miscarriage of justice" by keeping Day's case on its docket until after Lawrence is decided, "but it would be better practice for us to do so ourselves."

=== Scalia's dissent ===
Scalia, joined by Breyer and Clarence Thomas, objected that the Court was disregarding the clear provisions of the Federal Rules of Civil Procedure (FRCP), which required the forfeiture of affirmative defenses when they are not raised. Because that ordinary forfeiture rule would be entirely consistent with the Habeas Rules and statutes, it should apply to the Antiterrorism and Effective Death Penalty Act (AEDPA) statute of limitations. Scalia asserted that it is instead "the Court's unwarranted expansion of the timeliness rule enacted by Congress that is inconsistent with the statute, the Habeas Rules, the Civil Rules, and traditional practice."

The FRCP govern in habeas corpus proceedings to the extent that those rules are not inconsistent with federal statutes or the Habeas Rules. Scalia stated that the Court did not identify any such inconsistency "because there is none." Scalia believed the forfeiture rule could not be inconsistent with traditional habeas practice because there was no applicable statute of limitations until AEDPA was enacted in 1996. It was also consistent with Habeas Rule 5(b), which requires the State's answer to state whether any claim in the habeas petition is barred by the statute of limitations. Finally, as Day had argued, forfeiture is also consistent with Habeas Rule 4 because that rule provides for sua sponte screening and dismissal by the district courts only prior to the filing of the State's answer. Scalia believed that the Court's concern over whether district courts could ever raise the AEDPA limitation sua sponte under Day's construction of the Habeas Rules begged the question, by assuming that courts should be able to raise that issue sua sponte. "That is precisely the question before us."

Scalia considered it most important that no provision of the habeas statute would be contradicted or undermined by applying the forfeiture rule to the limitations period. "Quite the contrary, on its most natural reading, the statute calls for the forfeiture rule." AEDPA enacted the one-year limitation period "without further qualification." Given the "background understanding" that failure to raise the defense of limitations constitutes waiver, "the statute implies that the usual forfeiture rule is applicable."

Scalia distinguished the other affirmative defenses to habeas petitions as having been created as judicial doctrines by the courts, "in the exercise of their traditional equitable discretion, because they were seen as necessary to protect the interests of comity and finality that federal collateral review of state criminal proceedings necessarily implicates." None of the defenses involved a time limitation, and the one-year limit in AEDPA "is entirely a recent creature of statute. If comity and finality did not compel any time limitation at all, it follows a fortiori that they do not compel making a legislatively created, forfeitable time limitation nonforfeitable." Court precedent prior to AEDPA had furthermore affirmatively rejected that the traditionally broad discretionary powers of habeas courts would support the imposition of a time limitation. "There is, therefore, no support for the notion that the traditional equitable discretion that governed habeas proceedings permitted the dismissal of habeas petitions on the sole ground of untimeliness."

The Court's observation that there was no substantive difference between allowing the State to amend its answer and simply dismissing sua sponte was characterized by Scalia as "what appears to be the chief ground of its decision." Scalia argued that if there was truly no "dispositive difference" between the alternatives, "the natural conclusion would be that there is no compelling reason to disregard the Civil Rules. Legislatively enacted rules are surely entitled to more respect than this apparent presumption that, when nothing substantial hangs on the point, they do not apply as written." Ata minimum, Scalia believed it "a nontrivial value in itself" to observe "the formalities of our adversary system" by requiring the State to amend its own pleading. Scalia also observed that in contrast to the "novel regime" adopted by the majority, there is already a well-developed body of law regarding whether a party should have leave to amend a pleading. "Ockham is offended by today's decision, even if no one else is."

Scalia also believed that under the Court's ruling, it would not be an abuse of discretion for a district court to override an affirmative waiver of the defense by the State, and that the Court's assertion to the contrary was "without relevant citation or reasoning."

== Subsequent events ==
Patrick Day was died in prison on November 27, 2024
