= Evans v. Chavis =

- Supreme Court of the United States

Decided January 10, 2006
- Full case name: Evans v. Chavis
- Citations: 546 U.S. 189 (more)

Holding
- Absent clear direction or explanation from the state supreme court about the timeliness of habeas filings or a clear indication that a particular request for appellate review was timely or untimely, a federal appellate court must itself examine the delay in each case and determine what the state courts would have held in respect to timeliness.

Court membership
- Chief Justice John Roberts Associate Justices John P. Stevens · Sandra Day O'Connor; Antonin Scalia · Anthony Kennedy; David Souter · Clarence Thomas; Ruth Bader Ginsburg · Stephen Breyer

Case opinions
- Majority: Breyer, joined by Roberts, O'Connor, Scalia, Kennedy, Souter, Thomas, Ginsburg
- Concurrence: Stevens (in judgment)

Laws applied
- Antiterrorism and Effective Death Penalty Act of 1996; Carey v. Saffold

Evans v. Chavis, 546 U.S. 189 (2006), was a United States Supreme Court case in which the court held that, absent clear direction from the state supreme court about the timeliness of habeas filings or a clear indication that a particular request for appellate review was timely or untimely, a federal appellate court must itself examine the delay in each case and determine what the state courts would have held in respect to timeliness.

== Background ==
The Antiterrorism and Effective Death Penalty Act of 1996 (AEDPA) gives a state prisoner whose conviction has become final one year to seek federal habeas corpus relief in 28 U. S. C. §2244(d)(1)(A), but it tolls this 1-year limitations period for the "time during which a properly filed application for State... collateral review... is pending" in §2244(d)(2). Under California's collateral review scheme, the equivalent of a notice of appeal is timely if filed within a "reasonable time." In Carey v. Saffold, 536 U. S. 214, the Supreme Court held, among other things, that (1) only a timely appeal tolls AEDPA's limitations period for the time between the lower court's adverse decision and the filing of a notice of appeal; (2) in California, "unreasonable" delays are not timely; and (most pertinently) (3) a California Supreme Court order denying a petition "on the merits" does not automatically indicate that the petition was timely filed.

Chavis, a person incarcerated by the state of California, filed a state habeas petition on May 14, 1993, which the trial court denied. On September 29, 1994, the California Court of Appeal also held against him. He then waited more than three years before seeking review in the California Supreme Court. On April 29, 1998, that court issued an order stating simply that the petition was denied. On August 30, 2000, Chavis filed a federal habeas petition. After the case reached it, the Ninth Circuit Court of Appeals concluded that the federal petition's timeliness depended on whether Chavis' state postconviction relief application was "pending," therefore tolling AEDPA's limitations period, during the 3-year period between the time the California Court of Appeal issued its opinion and the time he sought review in the California Supreme Court. The Ninth Circuit held that the state application was "pending" because, under Circuit precedent, a denial without comment or citation is treated as a denial on the merits, and a petition denied on the merits was not untimely.

The Supreme Court took up the appeal.

== Opinion of the court ==
The Supreme Court issued an opinion on January 10, 2006.

== See also ==
- Erie Railroad Co. v. Tompkins
