= Oregon v. Guzek =

- Supreme Court of the United States

Argued December 7, 2005 Decided February 22, 2006
- Full case name: Oregon, Petitioner v. Randy Lee Guzek
- Docket no.: 04-928
- Citations: 546 U.S. 517 (more) 126 S. Ct. 1226; 163 L. Ed. 2d 1112; 2006 U.S. LEXIS 1818; 74 U.S.L.W. 4142; 19 Fla. L. Weekly Fed. S 100

Case history
- Prior: Defendant convicted, Circuit Court of Deschutes County, 1988; conviction affirmed, sentence vacated, remanded, 797 P.2d 1031 (Ore. 1990); defendant resentence, Circuit Court of Deschutes County; sentence vacated, remanded, 906 P.2d 272 (Ore. 1995); defendant resentenced, Circuit Court of Deschutes County; sentence vacated, remanded, 86 P.3d 1106 (Ore. 2004); cert. granted, 125 S. Ct. 1929 (2005)

Holding
- States may constitutionally limit the evidence of innocence a defendant convicted of a capital offense may present at his sentencing hearing to the evidence already presented at his trial. Oregon Supreme Court vacated and remanded.

Court membership
- Chief Justice John Roberts Associate Justices John P. Stevens · Antonin Scalia; Anthony Kennedy · David Souter; Clarence Thomas · Ruth Bader Ginsburg; Stephen Breyer · Samuel Alito

Case opinions
- Majority: Breyer, joined by Roberts, Stevens, Kennedy, Souter, Ginsburg
- Concurrence: Scalia (in judgment), joined by Thomas
- Alito took no part in the consideration or decision of the case.

Laws applied
- U.S. Const. amend. VIII

Oregon v. Guzek, 546 U.S. 517 (2006), was a decision by the Supreme Court of the United States, which ruled that the Eighth Amendment to the United States Constitution does not grant criminal defendants facing the death penalty the right to introduce new evidence of their innocence during sentencing that was not introduced during trial. Accordingly, states could constitutionally exclude such evidence from the sentencing phase of a capital trial.

== Background of the case ==
=== First state appeal ===
Randy Lee Guzek was convicted of murder and sentenced to death. Chief Deputy DA Ron Brown prosecuted the case. The Oregon Supreme Court affirmed his conviction but vacated the sentence on appeal. The court ruled that the death sentence violated the Eighth Amendment because the jury was not presented with a "general mitigation question," which would ensure that it had the opportunity to give effect to any relevant mitigating evidence outside of the statutory factors that were submitted to it. The court remanded the case back to the trial court for a new sentencing trial.

=== Second state appeal ===
On remand, Guzek was sentenced to death again. Chief Deputy DA Joshua Marquis prosecuted the re-trial. Guzek appealed, and the Oregon Supreme Court again vacated the sentence, ruling that "victim impact" evidence that the State had presented during sentencing was irrelevant, so unconstitutionally secured the death sentence. The case was remanded for a third sentencing trial.

=== Third state appeal ===
During the third sentencing trial, prosecuted by special prosecutor Joshua Marquis, the trial judge failed to instruct the jury about a "true-life" sentencing option— life in prison without the possibility of parole— as an alternative to the death penalty. Guzek was once again sentenced to death. Based on this error, the Oregon Supreme Court vacated Guzek's sentence and remanded for a new sentencing trial.

Seeking to avoid further errors at his fourth sentencing proceeding, the court also addressed the exclusion of alibi evidence that Guzek had sought to admit, which consisted of transcripts of testimony by his mother and grandfather stating he was with them at the time of the murder. The Oregon Supreme Court ruled that under state law, and the Eighth Amendment, Guzek had a right to present this evidence during his death penalty sentencing and directed the trial court to admit all alibi evidence he submitted. The State of Oregon then petitioned the Supreme Court for review.

=== Fourth sentencing trial ===
As the result of the opinion of SCOTUS the Oregon Supreme Court reviewed the case yet again in 2007 (State of Oregon vs. Randy Lee Guzek, 153 P.3d 101 (Ore. 2007) and determined that in accordance with the SCOTUS decision, that live alibi testimony would not be allowed but that prior transcript alibi testimony of the defendant's mother and grandfather would be admitted. Although the sole remaining issue for the defendant was his right to have life without parole considered if he waived any ex post facto right, on May 5, 2010 as jury selection was starting Guzek wrote a pro-se 5-page brief demanding that life without parole (LWOP) be removed from consideration and the presiding judge, Judge Jack Billings so ordered. Clatsop County DA Josh Marquis returned for a third time to re-prosecute Guzek. In May 2010, after several further delays, the case of the State of Oregon vs. Randy Guzek went to trial again in Deschutes County, Oregon. On June 17, 2010, after about 5 hours of deliberation, the 8-woman, 4-man jury unanimously answered all the four questions required for a sentence of death to be rendered under Oregon's capital sentencing scheme "yes," and Guzek was immediately sentenced to death again for the murders of Rod Houser and Lois Houser.

== The court's decision ==
The United States Supreme Court unanimously reversed the Oregon Supreme Court, ruling that the Eighth Amendment's prohibition against cruel and unusual punishment did not create a right to introduce evidence of innocence in a defendant's death penalty sentencing phase if it had not been introduced in the trial phase. The U.S. Constitution permitted states to limit such evidence to that already presented at trial.

Guzek had also argued that this alibi evidence could be used to impeach the testimony of other witnesses. The Court left it open to the Oregon Supreme Court on remand to determine whether this was permissible under Oregon law.

== Subsequent developments ==
On December 13, 2022, Guzek's death sentence (along with everyone else on Oregon's death row) was commuted to life without parole by Governor Kate Brown. Sue Shirley, the daughter of Guzek's victims, reacted to the decision with outrage.

== See also ==
- List of United States Supreme Court cases, volume 546
- List of United States Supreme Court cases
- Capital punishment in Oregon
