= Will v. Hallock =

- Supreme Court of the United States

Decided January 18, 2006
- Full case name: Will v. Hallock
- Citations: 546 U.S. 345 (more)

Holding
- A refusal to apply the Federal Tort Claims Act’s judgment bar is not open to collateral appeal.

Court membership
- Chief Justice John Roberts Associate Justices John P. Stevens · Sandra Day O'Connor; Antonin Scalia · Anthony Kennedy; David Souter · Clarence Thomas; Ruth Bader Ginsburg · Stephen Breyer

Case opinion
- Majority: Souter, joined by unanimous

Laws applied
- Federal Tort Claims Act

Will v. Hallock, 546 U.S. 345 (2006), was a United States Supreme Court case in which the court held that a refusal to apply the Federal Tort Claims Act's judgment bar is not open to collateral appeal.

== Background ==
In a warranted search of Susan and Richard Hallocks's residence, United States Customs Service agents seized computer equipment, software, and disk drives. No criminal charges were ever brought, but the equipment was returned damaged, with all of the stored data lost, forcing Susan to close her computer software business. She sued the United States under the Federal Tort Claims Act, invoking the waiver of sovereign immunity in 28 U.S.C. §1346, and alleging negligence by the customs agents in executing the search. While that suit was pending, Susan also filed another action against the individual agents under Bivens v. Six Unknown Named Agents, alleging that the damage they caused to her computers deprived her of property in violation of the Fifth Amendment's Due Process Clause.

After the federal District Court dismissed the first suit on the ground that the agents' activities fell within an exception to the Tort Claims Act's waiver of sovereign immunity in §2680(e), the agents moved for judgment in the Bivens action. They relied on the Tort Claims Act's judgment bar in §2676, which provides that "the judgment in an action under 1346(b)... constitute[s] a complete bar to any action... against the employee of the government whose act or omission gave rise to the claim." The District Court denied the motion, holding that dismissal of the Tort Claims Act suit against the Government failed to raise the Act's judgment bar. The Second Circuit Court of Appeals affirmed, after first ruling in favor of jurisdiction under the collateral order doctrine. Under this doctrine, appellate authority to review all final decisions of the district courts under §1291, includes jurisdiction over a narrow class of decisions that do not terminate the litigation, but are sufficiently important and collateral to the merits that they should nonetheless be treated as "final".

The Supreme Court granted certiorari.

== Opinion of the court ==
The Supreme Court issued an opinion on January 18, 2006. The case emphasized a three part test initially posed by the court in Puerto Rico Aqueduct & Sewer Authority v. Metcalf & Eddy, Inc.:

Three conditions are required for collateral appeal: the order must “[1] conclusively determine the disputed question; [2] resolve an important issue completely separate from the merits... , and [3] be effectively unreviewable on appeal from a final judgment.
