= Dolan v. United States Postal Service =

- Supreme Court of the United States

Argued November 7, 2005 Decided February 22, 2006
- Full case name: Barbara Dolan v. United States Postal Service, et al.
- Docket no.: 04-848
- Citations: 546 U.S. 481 (more) 126 S. Ct. 1252; 163 L. Ed. 2d 1079; 2006 U.S. LEXIS 1820; 74 U.S.L.W. 4132

Case history
- Prior: Motion to dismiss granted, E.D. Pa., Mar. 19, 2003; affirmed, 377 F.3d 285 (3rd Cir. 2004); cert. granted, 125 S. Ct. 1928 (2005)

Holding
- The immunity of the U.S. Postal Service from lawsuits involving the loss of or negligent delivery of mail did not apply to a claim for injuries caused when someone tripped over mail negligently left by the Postal Service.

Court membership
- Chief Justice John Roberts Associate Justices John P. Stevens · Antonin Scalia; Anthony Kennedy · David Souter; Clarence Thomas · Ruth Bader Ginsburg; Stephen Breyer · Samuel Alito

Case opinions
- Majority: Kennedy, joined by Roberts, Stevens, Scalia, Souter, Ginsburg, Breyer
- Dissent: Thomas
- Alito took no part in the consideration or decision of the case.

Laws applied
- 28 U.S.C. §§ 1346(b)(1), 2674, 2680(b) (Federal Tort Claims Act)

Dolan v. United States Postal Service, 546 U.S. 481 (2006), was a case decided by the Supreme Court of the United States, involving the extent to which the United States Postal Service has sovereign immunity from lawsuits brought by private individuals under the Federal Tort Claims Act. The Court ruled that an exception to the FTCA that barred liability for the "negligent transmission of mail" did not apply to a claim for injuries caused when someone tripped over mail left by a USPS employee. Instead, the exception only applied to damage caused to the mail itself or that resulted from its loss or delay.

== Background of the case ==
On August 25, 2001, Barbara Dolan fell over letters, packages and periodicals placed on her porch by an employee of the United States Postal Service, suffering serious injury. Dolan initially filed an administrative claim with the Postal Service, which was denied on April 18, 2002. On October 15, 2002, Dolan filed a complaint against the United States and the USPS in the United States District Court for the Eastern District of Pennsylvania. As "an independent establishment of the executive branch of the Government of the United States," the United States Postal Service enjoys federal sovereign immunity absent a waiver. Dolan accordingly brought her claim under the Federal Tort Claims Act, which waives the government's sovereign immunity for certain claims arising from the negligence of federal employees committed in the course of their employment.

On March 19, 2003, the district court granted the government's motion to dismiss, holding that Dolan's claim was barred by the postal exception to the FTCA waiver of immunity, which applied to "any claim arising out of the loss, miscarriage, or negligent transmission of letters or postal matter." Dolan appealed, and the United States Court of Appeals for the Third Circuit affirmed the dismissal.

== The court's decision ==
The Supreme Court reversed the Third Circuit, ruling 7-1 that the postal exception under the FTCA did not include all negligence that occurred in the course of mail delivery. Instead, context and precedent required the exception to be limited to negligence that caused mail to be lost or to arrive late, in damaged condition, or at the wrong address. Dolan's suit was accordingly not covered by the exception and could proceed. The majority opinion was delivered by Justice Anthony Kennedy. Justice Clarence Thomas filed a dissent, arguing that the majority ignored the plain language of the statute.

=== Kennedy's majority opinion ===
The Court first noted that, if considered in isolation, the phrase "negligent transmission" in the postal exception could include a wide range of negligent acts committed in the course of delivering mail, including creating hazards of the kind for which Dolan sued. However, the complete statutory context and purpose behind a provision informs whether a word extends "to the outer limits of its definitional possibilities." The Court observed that the words "negligent transmission" follow the terms, "loss" and "miscarriage, so as to limit the reach of "transmission." Since both those terms refer to the failure to deliver mail in a timely manner to the right address, the Court considered it unlikely that "negligent transmission" could include injuries such as Dolan's that happened to be caused by postal employees but involved neither the failure to transmit mail nor damage to its contents.

The Court found support for its interpretation in Kosak v. United States, 465 U.S. 848 (1984), a case involving a claim against the United States Customs Service. The Court in Kosak discussed the postal exception to the FTCA to contrast it from the more general Customs Service exception, noting that one of the principal purposes behind the FTCA was to waive the government's immunity from liability for car accidents caused by postal employees. The postal service exception was therefore drafted narrowly, such that it did not cover all negligence in the course of mail delivery, because postal trucks could be delivering (and therefore "transmitting") mail when they collide with other vehicles. The Court could find no basis in the text of the statute for distinguishing injuries such as Dolan's that were "caused by the mail itself" from those caused by the negligent driving of postal vehicles. "In both cases the postal employee acts negligently while transmitting mail."

The Court also did not believe that the general rule applied that the government's waiver of immunity should be strictly interpreted in its favor. The Court considered this rule "unhelpful" in the FTCA context, because "unduly generous interpretations of the exceptions" would defeat the statute's central and sweeping purpose of waiving the government's immunity.

=== Thomas's dissent ===
Justice Thomas argued that the Court had failed to give the text of the postal exception its ordinary meaning. The definitions of "transmission"—"act, operation, or process, of transmitting"—and "transmit"—"to send or transfer from one person or place to another; to forward by rail, post, wire, etc., . . . to cause . . . to pass or be conveyed"—would include the conduct for which Dolan sued. Thomas did not believe there was any reason to conclude that Congress was unaware of these ordinary definitions when it enacted the FTCA and the postal exception in 1946, nor was there any contextual indication that a meaning other than the ordinary sense was intended.

Thomas considered that the discussion in Kosak at most established that the postal exception did not apply to auto accidents; that decision accordingly said nothing about "slip and fall" claims. Thomas furthermore believed that the Court in Kosak considered discrete acts determinative of the scope of Postal Service liability, rather than the consequences of those acts. Kosak therefore could not support for the majority's limitation, which was based on the consequence of the negligence—injury to the mail itself as opposed to injury caused by tripping over the mail.

Thomas further argued that even if the postal exception was ambiguous, any such ambiguity as to the scope of the Government's waiver of immunity should be resolved in its favor. Thomas believed the majority erred in failing to apply this rule just because it was construing an exception to waiver rather than waiver itself.
