= Domino's Pizza, Inc. v. McDonald =

- Supreme Court of the United States

Argued December 6, 2005 Decided February 22, 2006
- Full case name: Domino's Pizza, Inc., et al. v. John McDonald
- Docket no.: 04-593
- Citations: 546 U.S. 470 (more) 126 S. Ct. 1246; 163 L. Ed. 2d 1069; 2006 U.S. LEXIS 1821; 74 U.S.L.W. 4129

Case history
- Prior: Dismissed, No. 02-00311 (D. Nev. Aug. 22, 2002); reversed, 107 Fed. Appx. 18 (9th Cir. 2004); rehearing denied (9th Cir. Aug. 2, 2004); cert. granted, 125 S. Ct. 1928 (2005)

Holding
- The agent of a party to a contract cannot state a claim under 42 U.S.C. § 1981, because he himself does not have rights to make or enforce under the contract. Ninth Circuit Court of Appeals reversed.

Court membership
- Chief Justice John Roberts Associate Justices John P. Stevens · Antonin Scalia; Anthony Kennedy · David Souter; Clarence Thomas · Ruth Bader Ginsburg; Stephen Breyer · Samuel Alito

Case opinion
- Majority: Scalia, joined by Roberts, Stevens, Kennedy, Souter, Thomas, Ginsburg, Breyer
- Alito took no part in the consideration or decision of the case.

Laws applied
- 42 U.S.C. § 1981 (Civil Rights Act of 1866 § 1)

Domino's Pizza, Inc. v. McDonald, 546 U.S. 470 (2006), is a decision by the Supreme Court of the United States involving claims for racial discrimination against the right to make and enforce contracts under 42 U.S.C. § 1981, a key civil rights provision in U.S. law that was originally enacted as part of the Civil Rights Act of 1866. The Court ruled unanimously, in an opinion by Justice Antonin Scalia, that because agents of parties to contracts do not personally have rights under those contracts, they cannot state a claim under section 1981.

== Background ==
John McDonald, an African American entrepreneur, was the sole shareholder and president of JWM Investments, Inc. (JWM), a company organized under Nevada law. JWM and the restaurant chain Domino's Pizza entered into several contracts, under which JWM was to construct four restaurants in the Las Vegas area and then lease them to Domino's. McDonald claimed that after the first restaurant was built, Domino's agent refused to execute documents that the contracts required to facilitate JWM's bank financing, and convinced the Las Vegas Valley Water District to change its recorded ownership of the land slated for restaurant construction from JWM to Domino's (which McDonald managed to subsequently change back).

McDonald wanted to see the contracts completed, but claimed that the agent threatened "serious consequences" if he did not back out. The agent was alleged to have said to McDonald "I don't like dealing with you people anyway," a phrase she did not explain. The contracts were never completed, and at least in part because JWM filed for Chapter 11 bankruptcy.

The bankruptcy trustee for JWM initiated an adversary proceeding against Domino's for breach of contract, which was settled for a $45,000 payment to JWM and a complete release of all claims between the parties. While the bankruptcy proceedings were still ongoing, McDonald personally filed a lawsuit in the United States District Court for the District of Nevada under 42 U.S.C. § 1981 on the argument that Domino's broke its contracts with JWM because of racial animus towards McDonald. McDonald claimed that the breach had harmed him personally by causing monetary damages, pain and suffering, emotional distress, and humiliation.

Domino's filed a motion to dismiss the complaint for failure to state a claim. It argued that because McDonald was not himself a party to a contract with Domino's, he could not bring a § 1981 claim against it. The District Court granted the motion and dismissed McDonald's suit, stating that Domino's had "relied on the basic proposition that a corporation is a separate legal entity from its stockholders and officers," which means that "a president or sole shareholder may not step into the shoes of the corporation and assert that claim personally."

The United States Court of Appeals for the Ninth Circuit reversed the dismissal. Though it agreed that an "injury suffered only by the corporation" would not permit a shareholder to bring a § 1981 action, the court concluded that, based on its prior decision in Gomez v. Alexian Bros. Hospital of San Jose, 698 F.2d 1019 (9th Cir. 1983), a nonparty like McDonald may nonetheless bring suit under § 1981 when he has suffered "injuries distinct from that of the corporation." The court acknowledged that this approach set it apart from the precedents of other Circuits. The U.S. Supreme Court subsequently granted certiorari.

== Opinion of the Court ==
The Supreme Court unanimously reversed the Ninth Circuit in a decision delivered by Justice Antonin Scalia. The Court ruled that 42 U.S.C. § 1981 only applies to those who have enforceable rights under the contract.

Section 1981 protects the equal right of "all persons within the jurisdiction of the United States" to "make and enforce contracts" without respect to race. The statute currently defines "make and enforce contracts" to "include the making, performance, modification, and termination of contracts, and the enjoyment of all benefits, privileges, terms, and conditions of the contractual relationship."

The Court rejected McDonald's argument that the statute applied to him because he had "made and enforced contracts" on behalf of JWM. It believed that the right to "make contracts" guaranteed by the statute "was not the insignificant right to act as an agent for someone else's contracting—any more than it was the insignificant right to act as amanuensis in writing out the agreement, and thus to 'make' the contract in that sense." The right protected was instead the right to give and received contractual rights on one's own behalf, which many states had denied to African Americans when the Civil Rights Act of 1866 was drafted. The Court further noted that at that time, it was a well accepted legal principle that "a mere agent, who has no beneficial interest in a contract which he has made on behalf of his principal, cannot support an action thereon."

A § 1981 claim must therefore identify an impaired "contractual relationship" under which the plaintiff personally has rights, whether to make a contract not yet formed or to enforce one already made. The Court stated that "it can be said to be the whole purpose of corporation and agency law" that shareholders and contracting officers of corporations have no rights or liability under the corporation's contracts. McDonald's argument that because he "negotiated, signed, performed, and sought to enforce the contract," Domino's could not insist that the contract was not his own, the Court believed "makes light of the law of corporations and of agency," and "contradicts McDonald's own experience." It noted that during JWM's bankruptcy, Domino's filed a proof of claim against the corporation rather than McDonald personally. His personal assets were protected by the limited liability of the corporate form and the rules of agency, which "similarly deny him rights under those contracts."

The Court did not reject McDonald's alternative argument that § 1981 standing be extended to anyone who was the "actual target" of discrimination, and who loses some benefit that he would have received had a contract not been impaired. The Court believed this theory ignored the "explicit statutory requirement" that the plaintiff be the person whose rights were impaired on account of race. Past cases in which McDonald characterized the plaintiff's contractual relationship as unclear (and therefore, he argued, undermining a requirement of a contractual relationship) provided no support for his position, because those cases simply did not discuss or decide that issue.

McDonald also argued that "many discriminatory acts will go unpunished" if his interpretation of the statute was not adopted. The Court instead believed that the parties who actually suffered a breach of contract would likely pursue available remedies. In response to numerous hypothetical examples of unpunished discrimination described in McDonald's brief, including a scenario in which "Domino's officials had beaten up McDonald in an attempt to intimidate him," the Court simply noted that there are other laws available, particularly criminal law, to address such conduct. "The most important response, however, is that nothing in the text of § 1981 suggests that it was meant to provide an omnibus remedy for all racial injustice. If so, it would not have been limited to situations involving contracts." Giving it a more expansive reading would "produce satellite § 1981 litigation of immense scope," for example permitting class actions by all the minority employees of a non-breaching party to a broken contract.

== See also ==
- Corporate personhood
