= Holmes v. South Carolina =

- Supreme Court of the United States

Argued February 22, 2006 Decided May 1, 2006
- Full case name: Bobby Lee Holmes v. South Carolina
- Docket no.: 04-1327
- Citations: 547 U.S. 319 (more) 126 S. Ct. 1727; 2006 U.S. LEXIS 3454; 74 U.S.L.W. 4221

Case history
- Prior: Defendant convicted, York County Circuit Court, 1993; affirmed, 464 S.E.2d 334 (S.C. 1995); rehearing denied, S.C., June 10, 1996; cert. denied, 517 U.S. 1248 (1996); new trial granted; defendant convicted, York County Circuit Court; affirmed, 605 S.E.2d 19 (S.C. 2004); cert. granted in part, 126 S. Ct. 34 (2005)

Holding
- A state cannot exclude evidence presented by a criminal defendant that a third party committed the crime simply because the prosecution has a strong case.

Court membership
- Chief Justice John Roberts Associate Justices John P. Stevens · Antonin Scalia; Anthony Kennedy · David Souter; Clarence Thomas · Ruth Bader Ginsburg; Stephen Breyer · Samuel Alito

Case opinion
- Majority: Alito, joined by unanimous

Laws applied
- U.S. Const. amends. VI, XIV

Holmes v. South Carolina, 547 U.S. 319 (2006), was a decision by the United States Supreme Court involving the right of a criminal defendant to present evidence that a third party instead committed the crime. The Court vacated the rape and murder conviction in South Carolina of a man who had been denied the opportunity to present evidence of a third party's guilt, because the trial court believed the prosecutor's forensic evidence was too strong for the defendant's evidence to raise an inference of innocence. The Court ruled unanimously that this exclusion violated the right of a defendant to have a meaningful opportunity to present a complete defense, because the strength of a prosecutor's case had no logical relationship to whether a defendant's evidence was too weak to be admissible.

The opinion was delivered by Justice Samuel Alito, and was his first opinion as a member of the Court following his confirmation on January 31, 2006. This follows a Supreme Court tradition that the first written opinion of a new justice reflect a unanimous decision. Also, this case had marked the last time in ten years that Clarence Thomas had asked a question during oral argument. This period of silence lasted until shortly after the death of Antonin Scalia, with the oral argument during Voisine v. United States.

== Background ==
In 1989, an 86-year-old woman was beaten, raped, and robbed in her home in South Carolina, and died the following year of complications stemming from her injuries. After a four-day jury trial in York County Circuit Court in 1993, Bobby Lee Holmes was convicted of the crime and sentenced to death. The South Carolina Supreme Court affirmed his convictions and sentence, and the U.S. Supreme Court denied certiorari. Holmes was granted a new trial, however, upon state postconviction review.

At the second trial, the prosecution relied heavily on forensic evidence that Holmes' palm print and fibers consistent with his clothing were found at the scene, that the victim's DNA was found in Holmes' underwear and her blood was found on his tank top. The prosecution also introduced evidence that Holmes had been seen near the victim's home within an hour of when the prosecutor believed the attack took place.

As a major part of his defense, Holmes presented expert witnesses who claimed that the forensic evidence was contaminated by poor handling procedures, and that the palm print was planted by police who Holmes asserted were trying to frame him. Holmes also tried to introduce proof that another man, Jimmy McCaw White, had actually attacked the victim. At a pretrial hearing, Holmes had presented several witnesses who placed White in the victim's neighborhood on the morning of the attack, and four other witnesses who testified that White had admitted to committing the crime, or at least acknowledged that Holmes was innocent. White testified at the pretrial hearing and denied making the incriminating statements. He also provided an alibi for the time of the crime, but this was refuted by another witness.

The trial court excluded Holmes' third-party guilt evidence based on State v. Gregory, 16 S.E.2d 532 (S.C. 1941), in which the South Carolina Supreme Court had held that such evidence is only admissible if it "raises a reasonable inference or presumption as to [the defendant's] own innocence." Holmes was subsequently convicted again. On appeal, the South Carolina Supreme Court affirmed the conviction, citing to both Gregory and its later decision in State v. Gay 541 S.E.2d 541 (S.C. 2001). The State Supreme Court held that "where there is strong evidence of an appellant's guilt, especially where there is strong forensic evidence, the proffered evidence about a third party's alleged guilt does not raise a reasonable inference as to the appellant's own innocence." Applying this standard, the court held that petitioner could not "overcome the forensic evidence against him to raise a reasonable inference of his own innocence." The U.S. Supreme Court granted certiorari.

== Opinion of the Court ==
In a unanimous decision by Justice Samuel Alito, the U.S. Supreme Court vacated and remanded the decision of the South Carolina Supreme Court. The Court ruled that the South Carolina rule of evidence did not rationally serve the interest of "excluding evidence that has only a very weak logical connection to the central issues", because it was illogical to determine the weakness of a defendant's evidence by the strength of the prosecution's case.

Though state and federal rulemakers have broad constitutional latitude to establish rules of evidence in criminal trials, this is limited by the guarantee that criminal defendants have "a meaningful opportunity to present a complete defense", a right protected by both the Compulsory Process Clause of the Sixth Amendment and the Due Process Clause of the Fourteenth Amendment. This right is violated by rules of evidence that "infringe upon a weighty interest of the accused" and are arbitrary or "disproportionate to the purposes they are designed to serve". The Court had struck several such arbitrary rules as unconstitutional in prior decisions.

Well-established rules of evidence permit trial judges to exclude defense evidence if its probative value is outweighed by its unfair prejudice, confusion of the issues, or potential to mislead the jury. The Court noted that it had elaborated on this standard by permitting the exclusion of evidence that is "repetitive, only marginally relevant or poses an undue risk of harassment, prejudice, or confusion of the issues". (Internal marks and citations omitted.) Rules regulating the admissibility of third-party guilt apply this principle, because this evidence is often too speculative or remotely associated with the crime. The Court observed that these rules are widely accepted, and were not in and of themselves being challenged in this case.

The Court believed the rule adopted by the South Carolina Supreme Court in Gregory to be of this kind, and to have been adapted from a rule presented in Corpus Juris Secundum and American Jurisprudence. However, the Court considered the later decision in State v. Gay and the instant case to represent a radical change and extension of the Gregory rule. In Gay, the South Carolina Supreme Court had ruled that the defendant's evidence could not raise a "reasonable inference" of his innocence "in view of the strong evidence" of his guilt, particularly the forensic evidence. Similarly, in the present case, the court applied the rule that "where there is strong evidence of [a defendant's] guilt, especially where there is strong forensic evidence, the proffered evidence about a third party's alleged guilt" may (or perhaps must) be excluded.

This rule was in error, the Court wrote, because it required the trial judge to focus on the strength of the prosecution's case instead of the probative value or the potential adverse effects of admitting the defense evidence of third-party guilt. The Court also believed that, as applied in this case, the rule did not seem to require any substantial examination of the credibility of the prosecution's witnesses or the reliability of its evidence. Holmes had argued that the forensic evidence was so unreliable that it should not have been admitted, yet in its evaluation of the "strength" of that evidence, the South Carolina Supreme Court made no mention of these defense challenges.

The Court stated that the rule was no more logical than if it were to instead exclude the prosecutor's evidence of the defendant's guilt if the defendant were able to present evidence that, if believed, strongly supported a not guilty verdict. "The point is that, by evaluating the strength of only one party's evidence, no logical conclusion can be reached regarding the strength of contrary evidence offered by the other side to rebut or cast doubt." The Court therefore found the rule to be "arbitrary" and in violation of a criminal defendant's right to have "a meaningful opportunity to present a complete defense".
