= Dennis Davin =

Dennis M. Davin
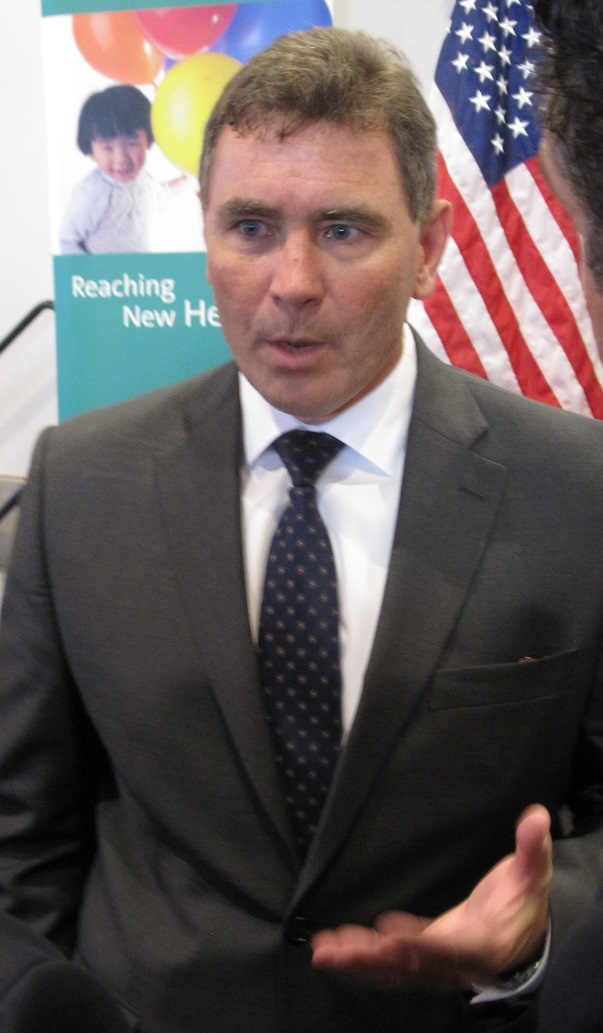

Secretary of Community and Economic Development of Pennsylvania
- In office May 11, 2015 – February 11, 2022
- Governor: Tom Wolf
- Preceded by: C. Alan Walker
- Succeeded by: Neil Weaver (acting)

Dennis M. Davin served as Pennsylvania Secretary of Community and Economic Development from 2015 until 2022, having been nominated by Pennsylvania Governor Tom Wolf and confirmed in May 2015. Previously, he served as Director of the Allegheny County Department of Economic Development.

== Biography ==
Before his appointment, Secretary Davin served as Director of the Allegheny County Department of Economic Development (ACED), where he was responsible for creating and executing the economic development strategy for Allegheny County. He managed funding from local, state and federal sources to implement economic development activities such as site development, new job creation initiatives, community development, and affordable housing for approximately 1.25 million citizens in 130 municipalities. One project he is specifically proud of is the Greater Allegheny Passage which is a trail system that goes from Point State Park in Pittsburgh all the way to Washington, D.C. in Georgetown.
