= Williams v. Price =

- Court: United States Court of Appeals for the Third Circuit
- Full case name: Ronald A. Williams v. James Price, Superintendent, SCI-Pittsburgh; D. Michael Fisher, Attorney General
- Argued: February 10, 2003
- Decided: September 9, 2003
- Citation: 343 F.3d 223

Court membership
- Judges sitting: Samuel Alito, Theodore A. McKee, William Schwarzer (N.D. Cal.)

Case opinions
- Majority: Alito, joined by a unanimous court

Williams v. Price, 343 F.3d 223 (3d Cir. 2003), was a 2003 legal case decided in the United States Court of Appeals for the Third Circuit. The appellant was Ronald A. Williams, an African American prisoner; the suit was brought against James Price, the prison superintendent of State Correctional Institution – Pittsburgh, and D. Michael Fisher, the then-Attorney General of Pennsylvania.

The case involved voir dire, a legal process in which potential jurors are asked questions to investigate their suitability for jury duty. Williams, serving life imprisonment for first-degree murder for the 1984 slaying of Archie Bradley in Cranberry Township, Butler County, Pennsylvania. Williams alleged that his Sixth Amendment right to an impartial jury was abridged when jurors lied regarding their racial prejudices during voir dire. State courts had refused to consider the testimony of a witness who stated that a juror had uttered derogatory remarks about African Americans during an encounter in the courthouse after the conclusion of the trial.

Samuel Alito, writing the court's opinion, declared that "the state courts' refusal to receive some but not all of this evidence violated Williams's clearly established constitutional rights."

The opinion granted a writ of habeas corpus to Williams.
