= Bruin Alumni Association =

The Bruin Alumni Association is a conservative group for alumni of University of California, Los Angeles. It has no official affiliation with the University of California or the official UCLA Alumni Association. It is a private, 501(c)(3) non-profit organization founded in 2005 by Andrew Jones, who graduated from UCLA in 2003 with a Bachelor of Arts degree in political science and a minor in public policy. Jones runs the organization largely on his own with private donations.

The association has gained notoriety for its "Exposing UCLA's Radical Professors" initiative (UCLAProfs.com), which offered to pay students to inform on faculty "actively proselytizing their extreme views in the classroom, whether or not the commentary is relevant to the class topic." The association seeks to tackle what Jones alleges is a strong liberal bias (what he describes as a "cancer of political radicalism") at UCLA, by soliciting donations from alumni, then using the money to campaign against activist professors, the UCLA Alumni Association and administrators.

Although the group says it is concerned about radical professors of any political stripe, in its initial "Dirty 30" of teachers it names, all are identified only with left-wing or liberal causes. Jones, former chairman of UCLA's Bruin Republicans student group, was a firebrand conservative activist while a student at UCLA, active in Republican causes, and founder of the conservative campus publication The UCLA Criterion. As a student Jones was known as a controversial agitator, gaining notoriety for a 2003 publicity stunt called the "Affirmative Action Bake Sale" where he offered lower prices on baked goods to minority students, mirroring the preferences inherent in affirmative action itself.

As justification for exposing those he considers to be radical professors, Jones says, "One aspect of this radicalization, outlined [on the website], is an unholy alliance between anti-war professors, radical Muslim students, and a pliant administration. Working together, they have made UCLA a major organizing center for opposition to the War on Terror." Other issues common to the conservative cause the association finds objectionable are diversity and the related topic, affirmative action.

To assist in "exposing the most radical professors" at UCLA, the association offered students $100 to record classroom lectures of suspect faculty, $50 for notes and materials, and $10 for advisory and all professor-distributed materials. The offer was originally made on the association's website, asking them to report any "professor who just can't stop talking about President Bush, about the war in Iraq, about the Republican Party, or any other ideological issue."

UCLA Chancellor Albert Carnesale denounced the campaign as "reprehensible" and school officials warned that selling, distributing recordings of classroom lectures without an instructor's consent might violate university policy. UCLA spokesman Phil Hampton said the university was sending Jones a letter warning him that faculty hold copyrights to all their course materials and that in their view, his campaign encouraged students to violate school policy and the UCLA Student Code of Conduct.

The offer to pay informers was dropped by Jones on January 22, 2006 saying the payment program had become "a distraction from the real problem, which is classroom indoctrination by UCLA professors."

The association claims to have an advisory council of over 20 members, consisting of conservative activists, scholars – including four UCLA professors – and which at one time included state Sen. Bill Morrow. News of the campaign prompted former Congressman Jim Rogan, who helped lead the drive for impeachment of then-President Bill Clinton in the U.S. House of Representatives, to insist the association not list him as an advisory council member. Rogan says his name was listed without his permission and his contact with the association consisted of one phone conversation. At least two other members of the advisory board have resigned over the group's efforts to have students record their professors.

Critics of Jones's website have expressed concern that Jones has not drawn a sharp enough distinction between what so-called "radical" professors do and say inside the classroom and what they do outside of it, such as signing petitions and engaging in other sorts of political activities.

Despite widespread media attention UCLAProfs.com received in early 2006, no professor profiles beyond the initial "Dirty 30" have ever been added the website.

== See also ==
- Concerned Alumni of Princeton
