= Chittister v. Department of Community & Economic Development =

- Court: United States Court of Appeals for the Third Circuit
- Full case name: David D. Chittister v. Department of Community and Economic Development, et al
- Argued: June 30, 2000
- Decided: August 30, 2000
- Citation: 226 F.3d 223 (3rd Cir. 2000)

Court membership
- Judges sitting: Samuel Alito, Theodore McKee, John P. Fullam (E.D. Pa.)

Case opinions
- Majority: Alito, joined by McKee, Fullam

Laws applied
- Family and Medical Leave Act
- Overruled by
- Nevada Department of Human Resources v. Hibbs, 538 U.S. 721 (2003)

Chittister v. Department of Community & Economic Development, 226 F.3d 223 (3rd Cir. 2000) was a U.S. legal case about whether states may be subjected to money damages for failing to comply with the family care provision in the federal Family and Medical Leave Act (FMLA). A decision by the lower circuit court of appeals in favor of the state was overturned by the Supreme Court of the United States.

== Background ==
On February 14, 1997, plaintiff David D. Chittister, an employee of the Pennsylvania Department of Community and Economic Development, requested sick leave. He was granted leave through May 2, 1997. Approximately ten weeks later, on April 21, 1997, Chittister's leave was revoked, and he was fired.

Chittister then filed in federal district court against the department and two state officials. Chittister asserted a claim under the FMLA, alleging that the defendants had improperly denied him leave and had fired him while he was on approved, paid sick leave.

After Chittister won a jury trial, the case was overturned in federal court on a point of law.

Judge Samuel Alito of the United States Court of Appeals for the Third Circuit wrote the decision in Chittister, in which Judges McKee and Fullam joined:

Notably absent is any finding concerning the existence, much less the prevalence, in public employment of personal sick leave practices that amounted to intentional gender discrimination in violation of the Equal Protection Clause.

The topic was settled by the Supreme Court of the United States, which found against states in Nevada Department of Human Resources v. Hibbs by a vote of 6–3. The Court's decision disagreed with the Third Circuit's ruling in Chittister. In Hibbs, the Ninth Circuit, in line with every other circuit that has considered the same question, held that the FMLA contains a sufficiently clear expression of congressional intent to abrogate state sovereign immunity.
