= Samuel Alito =

US Supreme Court justice since 2006

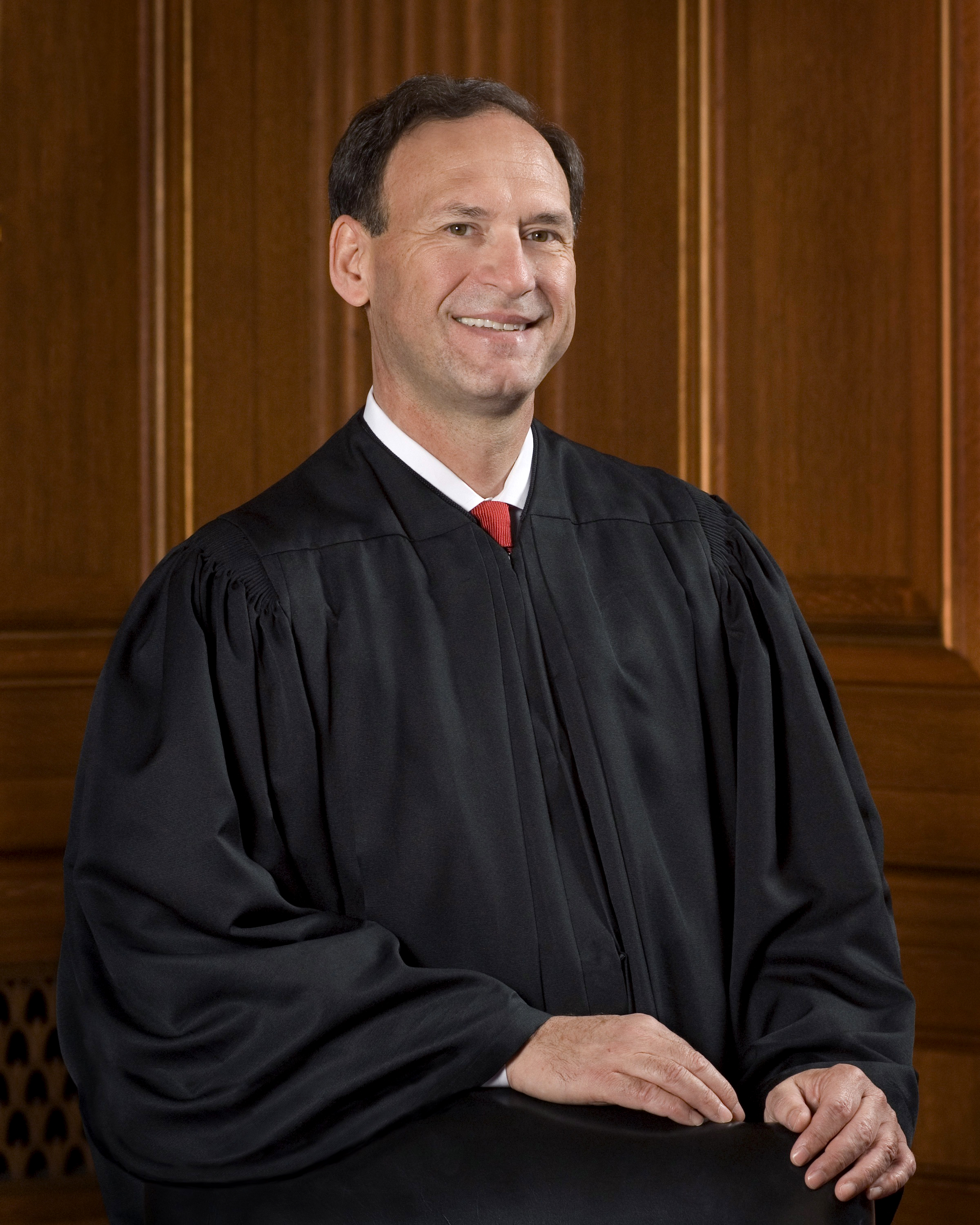
- Official portrait, 2007

Associate Justice of the Supreme Court of the United States
- Incumbent
- Assumed office January 31, 2006
- Nominated by: George W. Bush
- Preceded by: Sandra Day O'Connor

Judge of the United States Court of Appeals for the Third Circuit
- In office April 30, 1990 – January 31, 2006
- Nominated by: George H. W. Bush
- Preceded by: John Joseph Gibbons
- Succeeded by: Joseph A. Greenaway Jr.

United States Attorney for the District of New Jersey
- In office December 10, 1987 – April 30, 1990
- President: Ronald Reagan; George H. W. Bush
- Preceded by: Thomas Greelish
- Succeeded by: Michael Chertoff

Personal details
- Born: Samuel Anthony Alito Jr. April 1, 1950 (age 76) Trenton, New Jersey, U.S.
- Spouse: Martha-Ann Bomgardner (m. 1985)
- Children: 2
- Education: Princeton University (BA); Yale University (JD)
- Awards: Order of Merit of the Italian Republic (2017)

Military service
- Branch/service: United States Army (1972); United States Army Reserve (1972–1980)
- Rank: Captain
- Unit: Army Signal Corps
- Alito's voice Alito delivering the opinion of the Court in Murphy v. National Collegiate Athletic Association; Recorded May 14, 2018

Samuel Anthony Alito Jr. (/əˈliːtoʊ/ ə-LEE-toh; born April 1, 1950) is an American jurist who serves as an associate justice of the Supreme Court of the United States. He was nominated to the high court by President George W. Bush on October 31, 2005, and has served on it since January 31, 2006. After Antonin Scalia, Alito is the second Italian American justice to serve on the U.S. Supreme Court.

Alito was raised in Hamilton Township, New Jersey, and graduated from Princeton University and Yale Law School. After law school, he worked as an assistant attorney general for the Office of Legal Counsel and served as the U.S. attorney for the District of New Jersey. In 1990, Alito was appointed as a judge on the U.S. Court of Appeals for the Third Circuit, where he served until joining the Supreme Court. He has called himself a "practical originalist" and is a member of the Supreme Court's conservative bloc.

Alito has written majority opinions in the landmark cases McDonald v. Chicago (2010) on firearm rights, Burwell v. Hobby Lobby (2014) on insurance coverage, Janus v. AFSCME (2018) on public-sector union security agreements, and Dobbs v. Jackson Women's Health Organization (2022) on abortion.

== Early life and education ==
Alito was born in Trenton, New Jersey, on April 1, 1950. He was the son of Samuel A. Alito Sr. (born Salvatore Alati; 1914–1987), a Calabrian immigrant from Saline Joniche, a town in the municipality of Montebello Jonico, in the province of Reggio Calabria.. His mother was Rose Fradusco (1914–2013), an Italian-American whose parents came from Palazzo San Gervasio in Basilicata. Alito's paternal grandfather, Antonino Alati (1880–1963; anglicized to Anthony Alito), sailed from Italy to Philadelphia in 1913 aboard the SS Ancona. Alito's father earned a master's degree at Rutgers University and was a high school teacher and later the first director of the New Jersey Office of Legislative Services, a state government position he held from 1952 to 1984. Alito's mother was a schoolteacher.

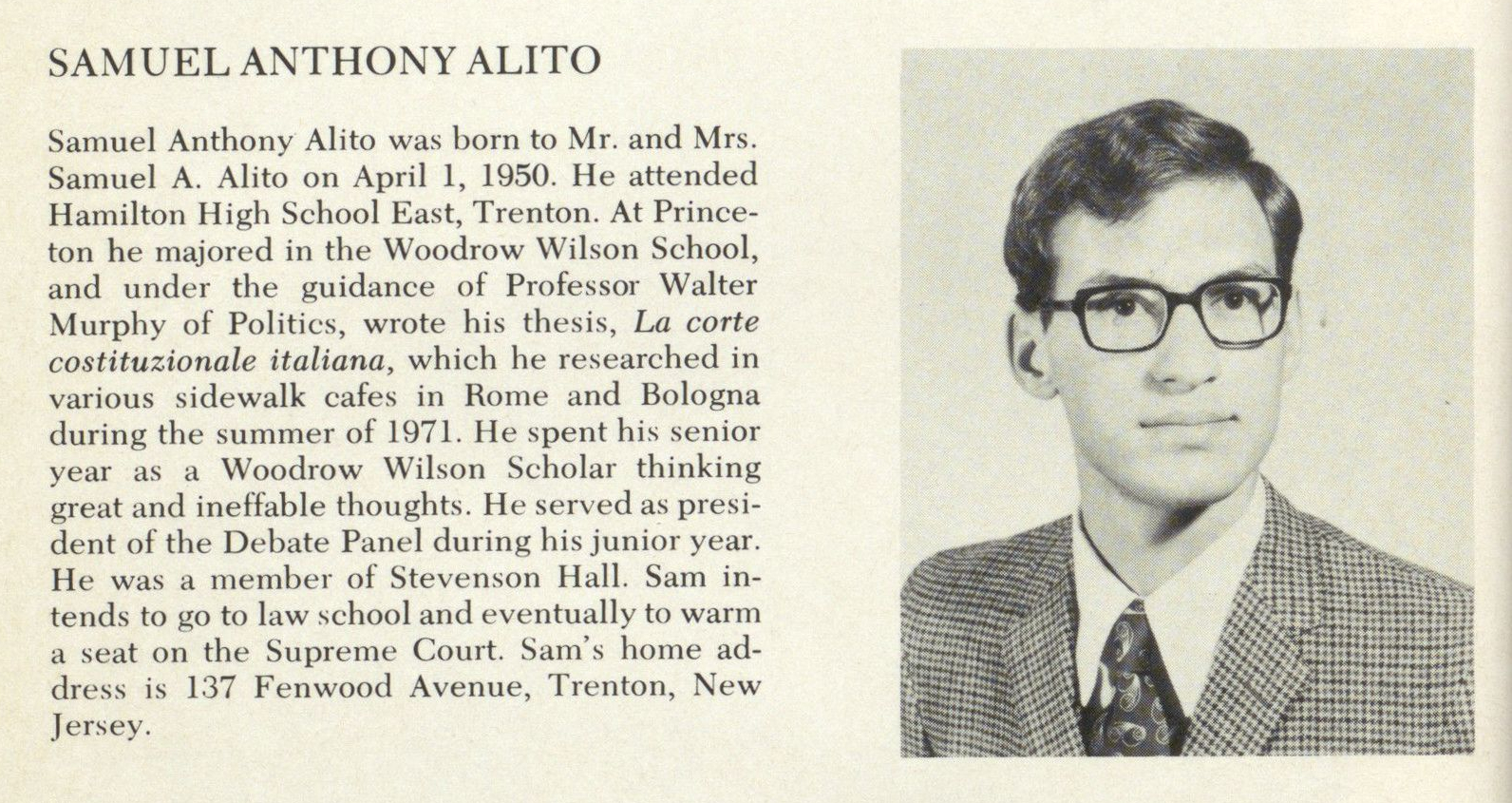
Alito in the Princeton University yearbook, 1972

Alito grew up in Hamilton Township, New Jersey, a suburb of Trenton. He attended Steinert High School, where he graduated in 1968 as the class valedictorian, subsequently matriculating at Princeton University. In 1972, he graduated with a Bachelor of Arts, summa cum laude, from the Woodrow Wilson School of Public and International Affairs. His senior thesis, supervised by political scientist Walter F. Murphy, was entitled "An Introduction to the Italian Constitutional Court".

At Princeton, Alito chaired a student conference in 1971 called "The Boundaries of Privacy in American Society", which supported curbs on domestic intelligence gathering and anticipated the need for a statute and a court to oversee national security surveillance. The conference report itself also called for the decriminalization of sodomy, and urged an end to discrimination against gay people in hiring. Alito also led the American Whig-Cliosophic Society's Debate Panel during his time at Princeton. He avoided Princeton's eating clubs, joining Stevenson Hall instead.

In December 1969, while a sophomore at Princeton, Alito received a low lottery number of 32 in the Selective Service drawing. He became a member of the school's Army ROTC program. (Note: Draft numbers were determined in a lottery based on birthdates; a low draft number increased the likelihood of being selected for compulsory military service overseas during the Vietnam War. The highest number called during the war was 215.) Alito was commissioned a second lieutenant in the United States Army Reserve in 1972. He began his military duty after graduating from law school in 1975 and served on active duty from September to December while attending the Signal Officer Basic Course at Fort Gordon, Georgia. Alito was promoted to first lieutenant and captain, and completed his service obligation as a member of the inactive reserve before being honorably discharged in 1980.

Among the members of the American Whig–Cliosophic Society, Alito was "almost alone" in his familiarity with the writings of John Marshall Harlan II and was greatly influenced by the course on constitutional interpretation taught by Walter F. Murphy, who was also his faculty adviser. During his senior year at Princeton, Alito moved out of New Jersey for the first time to study in Italy, where he wrote his thesis on the Italian legal system. Graduating in 1972, Alito left a sign of his aspirations in his yearbook, which said that he hoped to "eventually warm a seat on the Supreme Court". He joined Concerned Alumni of Princeton, a conservative group that opposed the admission of women, worried that "a student population of approximately 40 percent women and minorities will largely vitiate the alumni body of the future", warned of lowering admission standards, and criticized what it saw as permissive university policies.

Alito then attended Yale Law School, where he served as an editor of the Yale Law Journal and earned a Juris Doctor in 1975.

== Early legal career ==
After graduating from law school, Alito clerked for Third Circuit appeals judge Leonard I. Garth in Newark, New Jersey, in 1976 and 1977. He interviewed with Supreme Court Justice Byron White for a clerkship but was not hired. Between 1977 and 1981, Alito was Assistant United States Attorney, District of New Jersey. There, he served under the then-chief of the appeals division Assistant U.S. Attorney, Maryanne Trump Barry (Barry, the eldest sister of Donald Trump, later became a federal judge). While an Assistant U.S. Attorney for New Jersey, he prosecuted many cases involving drug trafficking and organized crime.

From 1981 to 1985, Alito was Assistant to U.S. Solicitor General Rex E. Lee. In that capacity he argued 12 cases before the Supreme Court for the federal government. Alito lost only two of the cases he argued before the Supreme Court. In Thornburgh v. American College of Obstetricians & Gynecologists (1986), the Supreme Court ruled against Solicitor General Charles Fried after he rejected a memo by Alito urging him to avoid directly attacking the constitutional right to an abortion.

From 1985 to 1987, Alito was Deputy Assistant Attorney General under Charles J. Cooper in the Office of Legal Counsel during the tenure of Attorney General Edwin Meese. John F. Manning worked under Alito there. Between 1986 and 1987, Alito authored nearly 470 pages of memoranda, in which he argued for expanding his client's law enforcement and personnel authorities. In his 1985 application for Deputy Assistant Attorney General, Alito espoused conservative views, naming William F. Buckley, Jr., the National Review, Alexander Bickel, and Barry Goldwater's 1964 presidential campaign as major influences. He also expressed concern about Warren Court decisions in the areas of criminal procedure, the Establishment Clause, and reapportionment.

From 1987 to 1990, Alito was the United States Attorney for the District of New Jersey. When he arrived, the office had begun the prosecution of 20 defendants accused of being mob affiliates of Anthony Accetturo. In August 1988, the two-year trial, then the longest federal criminal trial in history, ended in the acquittal of all 20 after less than two days of jury deliberations. Alito soon hired Michael Chertoff as his chief deputy.

After an FBI agent was shot in the line of duty in 1988, Alito personally handled the trial, assigning himself the then-novice Stuart Rabner as an assistant, and securing the shooter's conviction. In March 1988, Alito sought a rehearing of extradition proceedings against two Indian men, represented by Ron Kuby, who were accused of being terrorist assassins, after Alito discovered that the death threats his prosecutor, Judy G. Russell, had received had been sent to her by herself. The prosecutor was later found not guilty of obstruction of justice by reason of insanity, after psychiatrists found she may have suffered from schizophrenia, with up to four distinct personalities. In 1989, Alito prosecuted a member of the Japanese Red Army for planning a terrorist bombing in Manhattan.

Alito is a member of the Federalist Society, a group of conservative and libertarian lawyers and legal students interested in conservative legal theory.

== Court of Appeals judge ==
=== Nomination and confirmation ===
Third Circuit Judges Leonard I. Garth, for whom Alito clerked, and Maryanne Trump Barry, under whom Alito worked as an assistant U.S. Attorney, recommended Alito's judicial nomination to President George H. W. Bush. On February 20, 1990, Bush nominated Alito to the United States Court of Appeals for the Third Circuit, to a seat vacated by John Joseph Gibbons. The American Bar Association rated Alito "Well Qualified" at the time of his nomination. He was confirmed by unanimous consent in the Senate on April 27, 1990, and received his commission three days later. As a Third Circuit judge, his chambers were in Newark, New Jersey.

=== Notable opinions ===
Abortion

- On a Third Circuit panel, the majority in Planned Parenthood v. Casey overturned one part of a law regulating abortion, the provision mandating that married women first inform their husbands if they sought an abortion. Alito, the third judge on the panel, disagreed, arguing that he would have upheld the spousal notification requirement along with the rest of the law.

Federalism

- A dissenting opinion in United States v. Rybar, 103 F.3d 273 (3d Cir. 1996), arguing that a U.S. law banning private citizens from owning submachine guns was similar to one struck down by the Supreme Court in United States v. Lopez and thus outside the authority of Congress under the Commerce Clause of the U.S. Constitution.
- A majority opinion in Chittister v. Department of Community & Economic Development, 226 F.3d 223 (3d Cir. 2000). This case concerned an employee's claim of wrongful termination under the Family and Medical Leave Act against the Commonwealth of Pennsylvania. States are free to maintain sovereign immunity under the U.S. Constitution. Since Pennsylvania had maintained its immunity to such suits, Alito affirmed the lower court's dismissal of the employee's claims.

First Amendment

- A majority opinion in Saxe v. State College Area School District, 240 F.3d 200 (3d Cir. 2001), holding that a public school district's anti-harassment policy was unconstitutionally overbroad and therefore violated First Amendment guarantees of free speech.
- A majority opinion in ACLU v. Schundler, 168 F.3d 92 (3d Cir. 1999), holding that a government-sponsored holiday display consisting solely of religious symbols was impermissible, but that a mixed display including both secular and religious symbols was permissible if balanced in a generally secular context.
- A dissenting opinion in C. H. v. Oliva (3d Cir. 2000), arguing that the removal and subsequent replacement in "a less conspicuous spot" of a kindergartener's religious themed poster was, at least potentially, a violation of his right to free expression.

Fourth and Eighth Amendments

- A dissenting opinion in Doe v. Groody, arguing that qualified immunity should have protected police officers from a finding of having violated constitutional rights when they strip-searched a mother and her ten-year-old daughter while carrying out a search warrant that authorized the search of a residence.
- A unanimous opinion in Chadwick v. Janecka (3d Cir. 2002), holding that there was "no federal constitutional bar" to the "indefinite confinement" of a man imprisoned for civil contempt because he would not pay his $2.5 million debt to his wife.

Civil rights

- A unanimous opinion in Williams v. Price, 343 F.3d 223 (3d Cir. 2003), granting a writ of habeas corpus to a black state prisoner after state courts had refused to consider the testimony of a witness who stated that a juror had uttered derogatory remarks about black people during an encounter in the courthouse after the conclusion of the trial.
- A dissenting opinion in Glass v. Philadelphia Electric Company, 34 F.3d 188 (3rd Cir. 1994), arguing that a lower court did not abuse its discretion in excluding certain evidence of past conduct that defendant had created a hostile and racist work environment.
- A majority opinion in Robinson v. City of Pittsburgh, 120 F.3d 1286 (3rd Cir. 1997), rejecting a female police officer's Equal Protection-based sexual harassment and retaliation claims against the city and certain police officials and rejecting her Title VII-based retaliation claim against the city, but allowing her Title VII-based sexual harassment claim against the city.

== Nomination to the Supreme Court ==
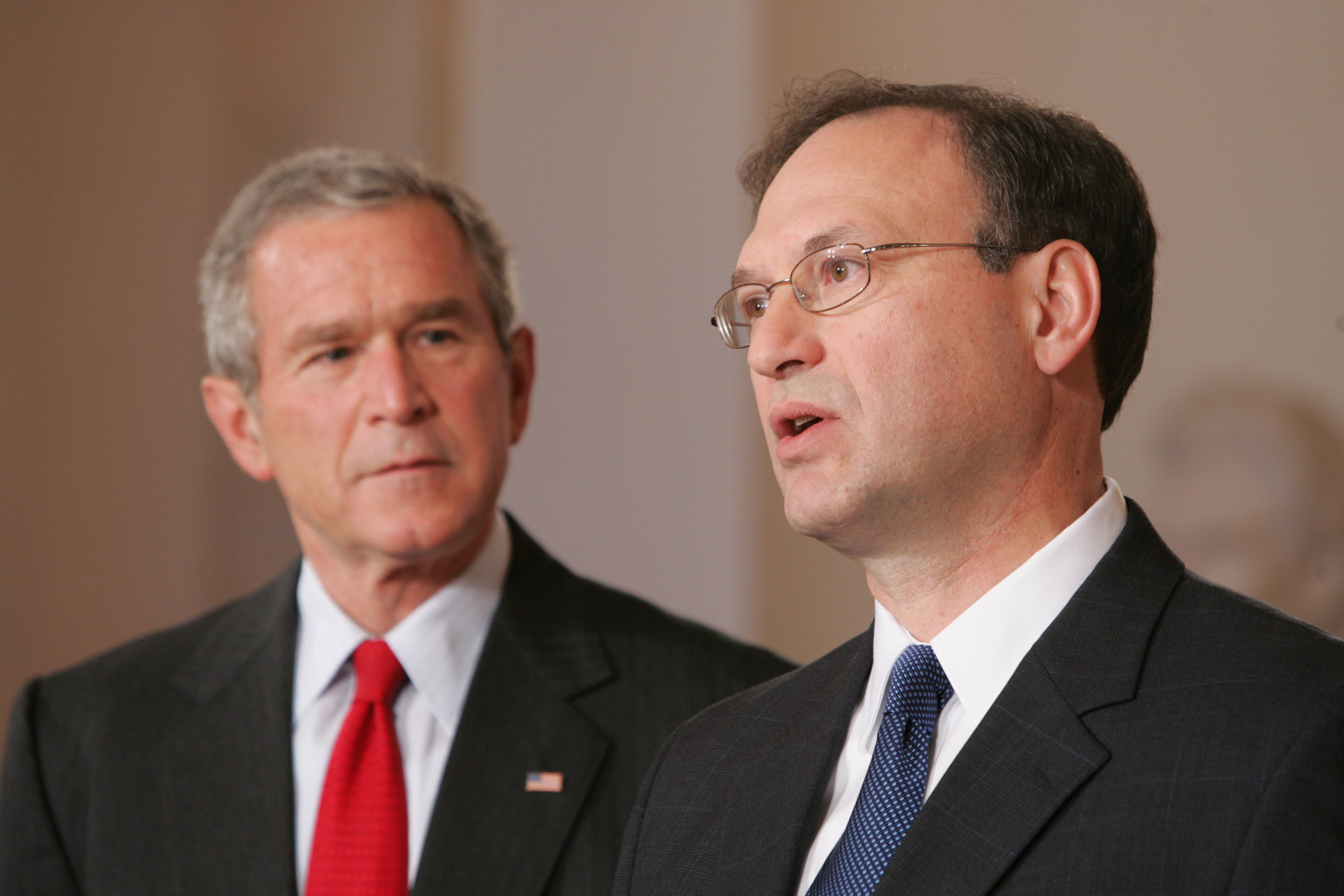
With President George W. Bush looking on, Alito acknowledges his nomination.

On July 1, 2005, Associate Justice Sandra Day O'Connor announced her retirement from the Supreme Court effective upon the confirmation of a successor. President George W. Bush first nominated John Roberts to the vacancy, but when Chief Justice William Rehnquist died on September 3, Bush withdrew Roberts's nomination to fill O'Connor's seat and instead nominated Roberts to the Chief Justiceship. On October 3, Bush nominated Harriet Miers to replace O'Connor. Miers withdrew her acceptance of the nomination on October 27 after encountering widespread opposition.

On October 31, Bush announced that he was nominating Alito to O'Connor's seat, and he submitted the nomination to the Senate on November 10. Alito was unanimously rated "well qualified" to fill the Associate Justice post by the American Bar Association's Standing Committee on Federal Judiciary, which measures the professional qualifications of a nominee. The committee rates judges as "not qualified", "qualified", or "well qualified". Leonard Leo was selected to play a role in shepherding Alito's appointment through the Senate.

Alito's confirmation hearing was held from January 9 to 13, 2006. Two active-duty members of the Third Circuit, Judge Maryanne Trump Barry and Chief Judge Anthony J. Scirica, testified in Alito's confirmation hearing, as did five senior and retired circuit judges. Alito responded to some 700 questions over 18 hours of testimony. He rejected the use of foreign legal materials in the Constitution, did not state a position on cameras in courtrooms (he had supported them while on the 3rd Circuit), said Congress could choose to outlaw LGBT employment discrimination in the United States if it wished, and told then-Senator Joe Biden (D-DE) that he endorsed a weak version of the unitary executive theory.

On January 24, his nomination was voted out of the Senate Judiciary Committee on a 10–8 party line vote. Democratic Senators characterized Alito as a hard-right conservative in the mold of Clarence Thomas or Robert Bork. Alito professed reluctance to commit to any type of ideology, stating he would act as an impartial referee. He said he would look at abortion with an open mind but would not state how he would rule on Roe v. Wade if that decision were to be challenged.

Democrats on the committee asked Alito about his past association with Concerned Alumni of Princeton. Alito said that he had listed an affiliation with the group on his application to Ronald Reagan's Justice Department in order to establish his conservative credentials: "You have to look at the question that I was responding to and the form that I was filling out... I was applying for a position in the Reagan administration. And my answers were truthful statements, but what I was trying to outline were the things that were relevant to obtaining a political position." But during the confirmation hearings, he disavowed the group, whose views were criticized as racist and sexist, saying: "I disavow them. I deplore them. They represent things that I have always stood against and I can't express too strongly."

The American Civil Liberties Union (ACLU) formally opposed Alito's nomination to the Supreme Court. The ACLU has only taken this step three other times in its entire history, opposing the nominations of William Rehnquist, Robert Bork, and Brett Kavanaugh. In releasing its report on Alito, ACLU Executive Director Anthony Romero said, "At a time when our president has claimed unprecedented authority to spy on Americans and jail terrorism suspects indefinitely, America needs a Supreme Court justice who will uphold our precious civil liberties. Alito's record shows a willingness to support government actions that abridge individual freedoms."

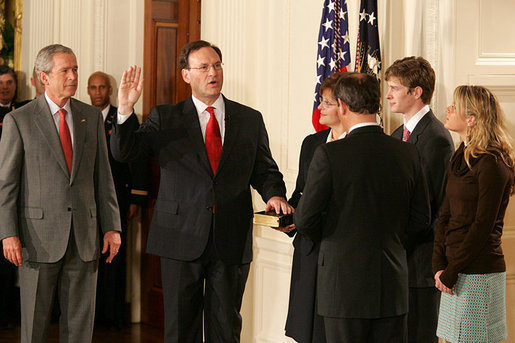
Alito ceremonially sworn in by Chief Justice John Roberts the day after his confirmation, February 1, 2006

Debate on the nomination began in the full Senate on January 25. After a failed filibuster attempt by Senator John Kerry, the Senate confirmed Alito to the Supreme Court on January 31 by a vote of 58–42. All Senate Republicans voted in favor of confirmation except Lincoln Chafee, and all Senate Democrats voted against confirmation except Tim Johnson, Robert Byrd, Kent Conrad, and Ben Nelson. An Independent, Jim Jeffords, voted against confirmation. Alito was sworn in as an associate justice of the Supreme Court later that day. He became the 110th justice, the second Italian-American, the 11th Catholic in the history of the Supreme Court, the fifth Catholic on the Court at the time he assumed office, and one of six on the Court as of 2024.

Because Alito joined the Court mid-term, he did not participate in the decisions of most of the early cases in the term because he had not heard arguments for them. These decisions were released by an 8-member Court, except for three—Garcetti v. Ceballos, Hudson v. Michigan, and Kansas v. Marsh—that were reargued, presumably because a tie needed to be broken.

== Supreme Court (2006-present) ==
=== Tenure ===
Alito delivered his first written Supreme Court opinion on May 1, 2006, in Holmes v. South Carolina, a case involving the right of criminal defendants to present evidence that a third party committed the crime. From the beginning of the Rehnquist Court to the nomination of Justice Elena Kagan, each new justice has been given a unanimous opinion to write as their first Supreme Court opinion; this practice is designed to help "break in" new justices so that each justice has at least one unanimous, uncontroversial opinion under their belt. Alito wrote for a unanimous court in ordering a new trial for Bobby Lee Holmes due to South Carolina's rule that barred such evidence based on the strength of the prosecution's case, rather than on the relevance and strength of the defense evidence itself. His other majority opinions in his first term were in Zedner v. United States, Woodford v. Ngo, and Arlington Central School District Board of Education v. Murphy.

In his first term, Alito compiled a fairly conservative record. For example, in the three reargued cases (Garcetti v. Ceballos, Hudson v. Michigan and Kansas v. Marsh), Alito created a 5–4 majority by voting with the four other conservative Justices – Chief Justice John G. Roberts and Justices Antonin Scalia, Anthony Kennedy, and Clarence Thomas. He further voted with the conservative wing of the court on Sanchez-Llamas v. Oregon and Rapanos v. United States. Alito also dissented in Hamdan v. Rumsfeld alongside Justices Scalia and Thomas.

Alito delivered the Supreme Court Historical Society's 2008 Annual Lecture, "The Origin of the Baseball Antitrust Exemption". The lecture was published in two journals.

In 2023, Martin–Quinn scores suggested that Alito was the most conservative Supreme Court justice. While his voting record is conservative, he does not always join the opinions of the Court's other conservative justices. On February 1, 2006, in Alito's first decision on the Supreme Court, he voted with the majority (6–3) to refuse Missouri's request to vacate the stay of execution issued by the Eighth Circuit for death-row inmate Michael Taylor. Justices Roberts, Scalia and Thomas were in favor of vacating the stay; Missouri had twice asked the justices to lift the stay and permit the execution. Moreover, despite having been at one time nicknamed "Scalito", Alito's views have differed from those of Scalia (and Thomas), as in the Michael Taylor case and various other cases of the 2005 term. A fierce critic of reliance on legislative history in statutory interpretation, Scalia was the only member of the Court in Zedner v. United States not to join a section of Alito's opinion that discussed the legislative history of the statute in question. In two higher-profile cases, one involving the constitutionality of political gerrymandering and one involving campaign finance reform (LULAC v. Perry and Randall v. Sorrell), Alito adopted narrow positions, declining to join the bolder positions advanced by either philosophical side of the Court. According to a SCOTUSblog analysis of 2005 term decisions, Alito and Scalia concurred in the result of 86% of decisions in which both participated, and concurred in full in 75%. Alito also differed from Scalia in applying originalism flexibly to arrive at conservative outcomes "with plodding consistency", rather than following it so strictly as to occasionally produce outcomes unfavorable to conservatives.

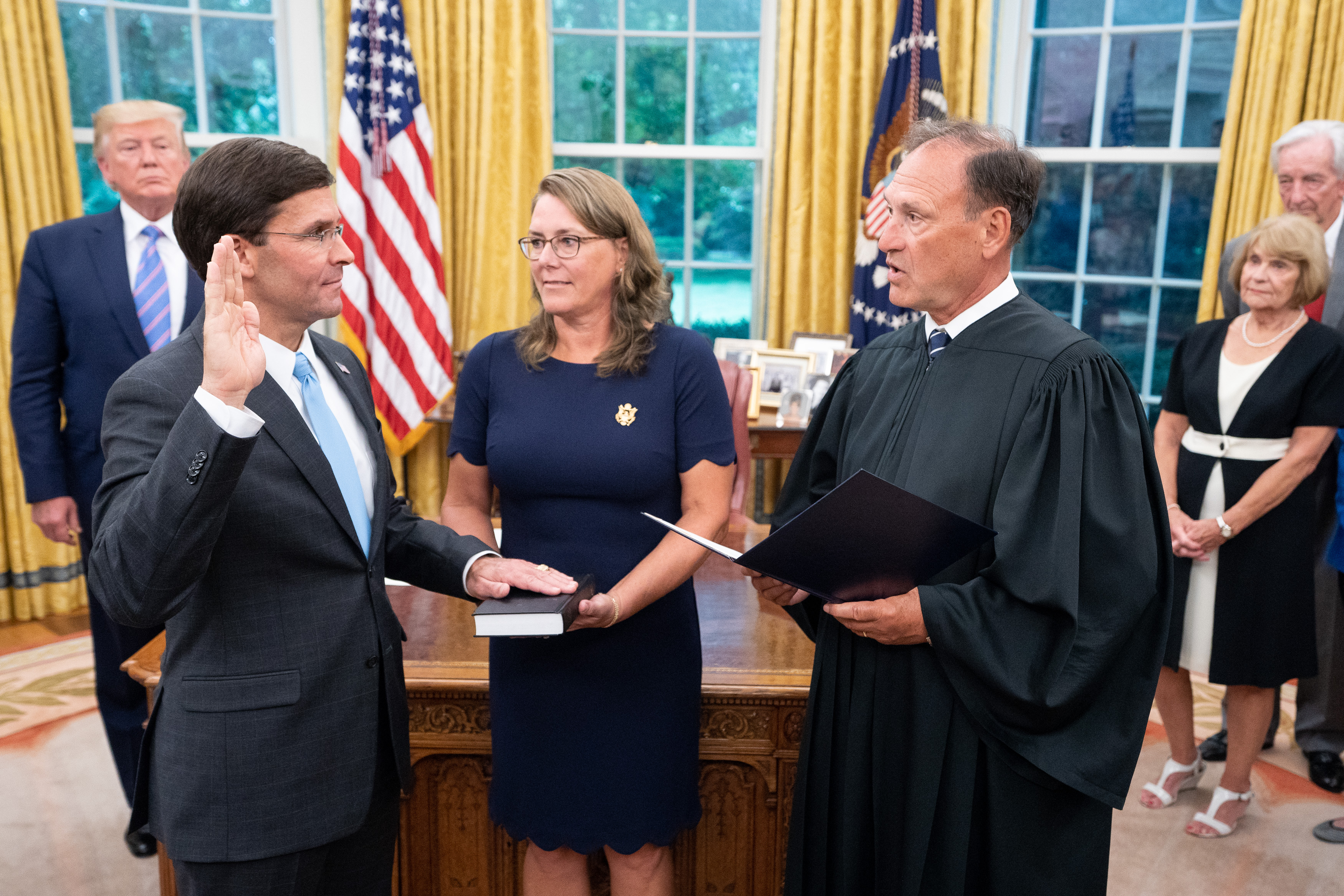
Alito swearing in Mark Esper as the United States Secretary of Defense in 2019

Alito's majority opinion in the 2008 worker protection case Gomez-Perez v. Potter cleared the way for federal workers who experience retaliation after filing age discrimination complaints to sue for damages. He sided with the liberal bloc of the court, inferring protection against retaliation in the federal-sector provision of the Age Discrimination in Employment Act despite the lack of an explicit provision concerning retaliation.

Alito joined Thomas in writing a separate dissent in Obergefell v. Hodges. In 2020, Alito wrote a dissent joined by Thomas to Bostock v. Clayton County, arguing that Title VII of the Civil Rights Act of 1964 does not prohibit discrimination by sexual orientation or gender identity and criticizing the majority's interpretation of Title VII. In October 2020, Alito agreed with the other justices on the denial of an appeal filed by Kim Davis, a county clerk who refused to issue marriage licenses to same-sex couples.

On November 12, 2020, Alito made headlines for comments about the COVID-19 pandemic. Speaking to the Federalist Society, Alito criticized what he called the "loss of individual liberties", saying, "We have never before seen restrictions as severe, extensive and prolonged as those experienced for most of 2020" and calling the pandemic "a Constitutional stress test".

Alito has called himself a "practical originalist" and is a member of the Court's conservative bloc. He has been described as one of the Court's "most conservative justices".

According to The New Yorker, since the 2020 appointment of Justice Amy Coney Barrett, Alito has become "the embodiment of a conservative majority that is ambitious and extreme", overruling progressive precedents from the 1960s and '70s that were previously out of conservatives' reach.

Alito drew controversy in June 2024 when a filmmaker who had been posing as a conservative posted a secret recording in which he could be heard agreeing with her assertion that Christians should win "the moral argument" against the Left and return the country to "a place of godliness". When asked about political polarization in the United States, he responded, "one side or the other is going to win".

==== Abortion jurisprudence ====
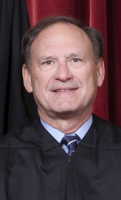
Samuel Alito, 2018

In 2003, Congress passed the Partial-Birth Abortion Ban Act, which led to a lawsuit in the case of Gonzales v. Carhart. The Court had previously ruled in Stenberg v. Carhart that a state's ban on partial birth abortion was unconstitutional because such a ban did not have an exception in the case of a threat to the health of the mother. The membership of the Court changed after Stenberg, with Roberts and Alito replacing Rehnquist (a dissenter in Roe) and O'Connor (a supporter of Roe) respectively. Further, the ban at issue in Gonzales v. Carhart was a federal statute, rather than a state statute as in the Stenberg case.

On April 18, 2007, the Supreme Court handed down a decision ruling the Partial-Birth Abortion Ban Act constitutional. Kennedy wrote for the five-justice majority that Congress was within its power to generally ban the procedure, although the Court left open the door for as-applied challenges. Kennedy said that the challenged statute was consistent with the Court's prior decisions in Roe v. Wade, Planned Parenthood v. Casey, and Stenberg v. Carhart.

Alito joined fully in the majority, as did Roberts. Thomas filed a concurring opinion, joined by Scalia, contending that the Court's prior decisions in Roe v. Wade and Planned Parenthood v. Casey should be reversed, and also noting that the Partial-Birth Abortion Ban Act may exceed the powers of Congress under the Commerce Clause. Alito, Roberts, and Kennedy did not join that assertion. Justices Ruth Bader Ginsburg, David Souter, Stephen Breyer, and John Paul Stevens dissented, contending that the ruling ignored Supreme Court abortion precedent.

On May 2, 2022, Politico published a leak of a first draft of a majority opinion by Alito that circulated among the justices in February 2022 for the upcoming decision in Dobbs v. Jackson Women's Health Organization. The opinion would overturn Roe v. Wade and Planned Parenthood v. Casey, and would likely either severely restrict access to abortion or make it completely illegal in states with trigger laws. On June 24, 2022, the ruling was handed down. It was mostly identical to the leaked draft, with the addition of replies to the dissenting and concurring opinions. Alito wrote that "Roe was egregiously wrong from the start", that its reasoning was "exceptionally weak" and that, "far from bringing about a national settlement of the abortion issue", it had "enflamed debate and deepened division". In July 2022, Alito gave his first public comments on the ruling in a keynote address for Notre Dame Law School's Religious Liberty Initiative in Rome. He mocked several foreign leaders for criticizing the decision, particularly U.K. Prime Minister Boris Johnson, referencing his pending resignation, and Prince Harry, Duke of Sussex, who had compared the ruling to the 2022 Russian invasion of Ukraine. During an October 2022 talk at The Heritage Foundation, Alito said that the leaked opinion made some justices "targets for assassination", referring to the assassination attempt on fellow Justice Brett Kavanaugh during that year. At the same event, he said that "questioning [the Court's] integrity crosses an important line", which many media commentators interpreted as criticism of Kagan's recent statements on the court's overturning of precedent during the past term.

In November 2022, as the investigation into who had leaked the draft opinion was still ongoing, it was revealed that Rob Schenck, an evangelical minister and former anti-abortion activist, had written Roberts a letter about an alleged previous leak of a Supreme Court decision. He wrote that he had been informed of the outcome of Burwell v. Hobby Lobby weeks before the June 2014 decision, authored by Alito and favorable to anti-abortion conservatives, was officially announced. Schenck claimed to have heard of the outcome from Gayle Wright, a conservative donor, shortly after she and her husband had lunch with Alito and his wife on June 3, 2014. The New York Times claims contemporaneous emails written by Schenck "strongly suggested he knew the outcome and the author of the Hobby Lobby decision before it was made public." In a statement, Alito denied having revealed the outcome or authorship of any decision before its official announcement, but did not dispute that the June 3 lunch with Wright had occurred.

On April 21, 2023, Alito dissented when the Supreme Court reversed a ruling by Judge Matthew Kacsmaryk that would have banned mifepristone (an emergency contraception medication) nationwide.

==== Free speech jurisprudence ====
Samuel Alito attending the inauguration of U.S. Environmental Protection Agency Administrator Scott Pruitt

Alito has also dissented from the opinions of the Court's conservative justices on free speech cases, one of which, Snyder v. Phelps, had to do with Westboro Baptist Church members' right to protest a military funeral. Alito offered the sole dissenting opinion, saying protesters "were sued under a very well-established tort that goes back to the 19th century, the intentional infliction of emotional, of severe emotional distress. And I thought that this tort constituted a reasonable exception to the First Amendment, but my colleagues disagreed about that."

In the 2007 landmark free speech case Morse v. Frederick, Alito joined Roberts's majority decision that speech advocating drug use can be banned in public schools, but also warned that the ruling must be circumscribed so as not to interfere with political speech, such as discussion of the medical marijuana debate.

== Personal life ==
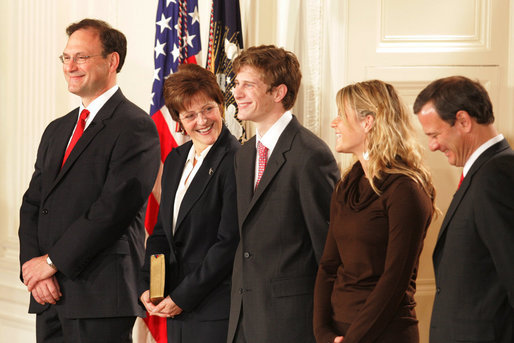
Martha-Ann Alito (second from left) in 2006

In 1985, Alito married Martha-Ann Bomgardner, a law librarian who met him during his trips to the library as a law clerk. They have two children; Martha-Ann left her profession to raise them. In early 2025, the second Trump administration appointed Alito's son Philip to the Treasury Department's general counsel. Alito resided with his family in West Caldwell, New Jersey, before his Supreme Court nomination. He has since moved to Fairfax County, Virginia.

Since Stephen Breyer's retirement in 2022, Alito has been the only military veteran on the Court. He is a baseball fan and a longtime fan of the Philadelphia Phillies. The Phillie Phanatic was a special guest at his Supreme Court welcome dinner.

In 2013, as part of the ongoing fallout from the Edward Snowden case, former National Security Agency analyst Russell Tice revealed that, during 2002 and 2003, the National Security Agency targeted Alito's phones, and those of his staff and his family, for surveillance.

=== Teaching ===
As an adjunct professor at Seton Hall University School of Law in Newark from 1999 to 2004, Alito taught courses in constitutional law and an original course on terrorism and civil liberties. In 1995, he received the school's Saint Thomas More Medal "in recognition of his outstanding contributions to the field of law". On May 25, 2007, he delivered the commencement address at Seton Hall Law's commencement ceremony and received an honorary law degree from the school.

As a visiting professor at Duke University School of Law, Alito taught Current Issues in Constitutional Interpretation in fall 2011 and a course in the Master of Laws in Judicial Studies program in summer 2012.

== Ethical questions ==
=== Accusations of accepting gifts ===
On June 20, 2023, ProPublica published an investigation of Alito's relationship with billionaire businessman Paul Singer, focusing on a trip Alito and Singer took to a luxury fishing resort in Alaska and suggesting Alito "violated a federal law that requires justices to disclose most gifts", such as private jet travel. The article said he should have recused himself in cases involving Singer and that he was obligated to disclose certain benefits as gifts on his 2008 Financial Disclosure Report. Legal ethics experts quoted in ProPublica called Alito's behavior "unacceptable".

Shortly before publication of the ProPublica article, Alito published an op-ed in The Wall Street Journal challenging the article's assertions and claiming that the source "misleads its readers". His preemptory challenge maintained that ProPublica's charges were invalid. Alito further contended that because of an exemption in the Court's reporting rules for "personal hospitality", he was not required to disclose private air transport for social trips. His decision to bypass traditional media inquiries and publish the information independently before reporters could release their findings surprised ProPublica's journalists. The decision to publish the op-ed was criticized both within the Wall Street Journal and by media critics, in part because it lacked fact-checking.

The ProPublica report on unreported gifts to both Alito and Thomas led several members of Congress to call for ethics reform for the Supreme Court. This included a Senate Judiciary Committee proposal to establish a code of ethics for the Court. In a July 2023 Wall Street Journal opinion column, Alito wrote, "Congress did not create the Supreme Court [...] I know this is a controversial view, but I'm willing to say it. No provision in the Constitution gives them the authority to regulate the Supreme Court—period." This declaration led to further debate among lawmakers. Senator Chris Murphy said the Constitution gives Congress power to oversee the Court: "It is just wrong on the facts to say that Congress doesn't have anything to do with the rules guiding the Supreme Court. In fact, from the very beginning, Congress has set those rules."

In 2024, The Guardian and The New York Times reported that Alito accepted $900 tickets from Princess Gloria von Thurn und Taxis for a music festival at Saint Emmeram's Abbey.

=== Flag display controversy ===
An upside down U.S. flag

The Pine Tree Flag

On January 17, 2021, an upside-down American flag was flown outside Alito's residence in Fairfax County, Virginia. The upside-down flag, traditionally a signal of distress, had been displayed a week earlier by supporters of President Donald Trump during the January 6 Capitol attack and by members of the Stop the Steal movement seeking to overturn the 2020 election results. In the summer of 2023, the Pine Tree Flag was flown at Alito's beach house on Long Beach Island in New Jersey. It was one of the flags used during the American Revolution, and has been used by Christian nationalists; it was also carried during the Capitol attack. The flag displays, reported by The New York Times, caused controversy, including questions about judicial impartiality. During the flag's presence, the Supreme Court was considering the appeal in United States v. Fischer (2023), a case involving the January 6 Capitol attack.

A secret recording by advocacy journalist Lauren Windsor captured Martha-Ann Alito discussing the event in June 2024. Martha-Ann Alito said, "I want a Sacred Heart of Jesus flag because I have to look across the lagoon at the Pride flag for the next month", adding that she would be "changing the flags" when her husband was "free of this nonsense" and that she would come with her own flag, which would be white with yellow and orange flames and read "vergogna" ("shame" in Italian). She also told Windsor that she would "get" "the media", adding: "Look at me. Look at me. I'm German, from Germany. My heritage is German. You come after me, I'm going to give it back to you".

Reactions were mixed, with most Democrats condemning Alito and most Republicans defending him. Senate Committee on the Judiciary chairman Dick Durbin requested Alito's recusal from cases involving the January 6 Capitol attack or the 2020 presidential election. House Committee on the Judiciary member Steve Cohen introduced a resolution to censure Alito. Forty-five representatives, joined by ranking member of the House Judiciary Committee Hank Johnson, signed a letter requesting Alito's recusal. Senator Tom Cotton called the controversy an intimidation attempt, while Senator Lindsey Graham said hoisting the upside-down flag was "not good judgment".

Alito responded that he had no involvement in hoisting either flag, saying: "I was not even aware of the upside-down flag until it was called to my attention" and "My wife is fond of flying flags. I am not". In an interview with Fox News, he reiterated that the flag was flown in response to a dispute with a neighbor, clarifying that his wife was upset about a "Fuck Trump" sign. He told Fox News host Shannon Bream that the neighbor blamed him for the January 6 Capitol attack and called his wife a "cunt".

Senior U.S. District Judge Michael Ponsor of Massachusetts called Alito's flag-flying "improper" in an essay published in The New York Times. Ponsor later apologized after Chief Judge Albert Diaz of the U.S. Court of Appeals for the Fourth Circuit found that his remarks hurt public confidence in the courts by taking issue with Alito's ethics.

== Bibliography ==
- So Ordered: An Originalist's View of the Constitution, the Court, and Our Country, Basic Liberty (2026).
- Foreword, 1 SETON HALL CIR. REV. 1 (2005).
- Panel Speaker at the Federalist Society's 2000 National Lawyers Convention: Presidential Oversight and the Administrative State, in 2 ENGAGE (Federalist Soc'y, Wash. D.C.) 11 (2001).
- The Role of the Lawyer in the Criminal Justice System, 2 FEDERALIST SOC'Y CRIM. L. NEWS (Federalist Soc'y, Wash., D.C.) 3 (1998)
- Change in Continuity at the Office of Legal Counsel, 15 CARDOZO L. REV. 507 (1993).
- Reviewing the Sentencing Commission's 1991 Annual Report, 5 FED. SENT. REP. 166 (1992).
- The First Amendment: Information, Publication and the Media, 1 SETON HALL CONST. L.J. 327 (1991).
- What Role Should Individual Sentencing Judges Play in the Guideline Development Process?, 1 FED SENT. REP. 372 (1989).
- Racketeering Made Simple(r), in THE RICO RACKET 1 (Gary L. McDowell ed. 1989).
- Introduction to After the Independent Counsel Decision: Is Separation of Powers Dead?, 26 AM. CRIM. L. REV. 1667 (1989).
- Shift Won't Hamper Crime Fight, DAILY J. (Vineland, N.J.), May 5, 1989.
- The Year Wasn't So Bad, NAT'L. L.J., September 26, 1998, at 12.
- Documents and the Privilege Against Self-Incrimination, 48 U. PITT. L. REV. 27 (1986).
- Equal Protection and Classification Based on Family Membership, 80 DICK. L. REV. 410 (1976).
- "The "Released Time" Cases Revisited: A Study of Group Decisionmaking by the Supreme Court". 83 YALE L.J. 1202. 1974. Archived from the original on February 22, 2015.
- An Introduction to the Italian Constitutional Court (A.B. Thesis, Princeton University, Woodrow Wilson School Scholar Project, May 31, 1972).

=== Related documents ===
- Legal Memo written while working in the United States Solicitor General's office regarding the Fleeing felon rule. (May 18, 1984) (PDF)
- 'Personal Qualifications Statement' when applying to be an Assistant Attorney General under Pres. Ronald Reagan. (November 15, 1985)
- Legal Memo written as Deputy Asst. Attorney General to the OMB's General Counsel regarding OMB authority of FDIC funds. (1986) (PDF)
- House Committee on the Judiciary testimony regarding unpublished court opinions. (1990) (PDF)
- 2003 Financial Disclosure
- 2004 Financial Disclosure
- Response to a Senate Judiciary Committee questionnaire (November 30, 2005) (PDF), (Appendix1 Appendix2 Appendix3 Appendix4)
- Letter from Justice Alito to Senators Durbin and Whitehouse (2024)

== See also ==
- Judicial restraint
- List of justices of the Supreme Court of the United States
- List of law clerks for the eighth seat of the Supreme Court of the United States
- List of United States Supreme Court justices by time in office
- Unitary executive theory
- United States Supreme Court cases during the Roberts Court

== Notes ==
Legal offices
Preceded by Thomas Grenlish	United States Attorney for the District of New Jersey; 1987–1990	Succeeded by Michael Chertoff
Preceded by John Gibbons	Judge of the United States Court of Appeals for the Third Circuit; 1990–2006	Succeeded by Joseph Greenaway
Preceded by Sandra Day O'Connor	Associate Justice of the Supreme Court of the United States; 2006–present	Incumbent
U.S. order of precedence (ceremonial)
Preceded by Clarence Thomas	Order of precedence of the United States as Associate Justice of the Supreme Court	Succeeded by Sonia Sotomayor
