= Concerned Alumni of Princeton =

Conservative student group (1972–1986)

The Concerned Alumni of Princeton (CAP) was a group of politically conservative former Princeton University students that existed between 1972 and 1986. CAP was born in 1972 from the ashes of the Alumni Committee to Involve Itself Now (ACTIIN), which was founded in opposition to the college becoming coeducational in 1969. Some claim that CAP was founded to bring the Reserve Officer Training Corps (ROTC) back to the Princeton campus after the ROTC building was burned down by anti-war activists and the Princeton administration refused to rebuild it. However, the ROTC had returned to campus by the time CAP was founded. The primary motivation behind CAP was to limit the number of women admitted to the university. CAP also opposed affirmative action designed to increase minority attendance at the Ivy League institution. CAP also exhibited strong support for Princeton's eating clubs, which were male-only at the time.

The existence of the organization attracted wide notice in January 2006 during the nomination of Samuel Alito, who was a former CAP member, to the Supreme Court of the United States, as Alito included his membership in the organization on a job application to work in the Reagan administration in 1985. No mention of Alito has been found in CAP files, apart from his own written 1985 statement of membership. Fox News legal analyst Andrew Napolitano was a founding member. Former senator Bill Bradley, a liberal Democrat, was a member until 1973, when he resigned because of the tone of the organization's magazine, Prospect. Former Republican Senator Bill Frist, at the time a recent Princeton alumnus, having graduated in 1974, contributed to a report that labeled the organization as far-right and extremist.

== Opposition to coeducation ==
In 1974, The New York Times reported on CAP's support for quotas guaranteeing that male students would receive most of the available admissions slots, and its earlier and continuing opposition to Princeton allowing women to attend at all. In the following excerpt, "Mr. Bushnell" refers to CAP co-chairman Asa S. Bushnell, and "Mr. Jones" refers to T. Harding Jones, CAP's executive director.

Whether or not the administration satisfies CAP on the faculty issue, the recent decision by the university's Board of Trustees to eliminate sex-based admissions quotas jolted these conservative alumni, many of whom wanted Princeton to remain an all-male institution in the first place.

When the trustees approved co-education in 1969, there was a widespread understanding that the male enrollment would be maintained at 800 per entering class. The subsequent adoption of an equal-access admissions policy last Jan. 19, along with the decision to retain undergraduate population at current levels, are expected to result in a decrease in the number of males matriculating each year.

"Many Princeton graduates are unhappy over the fact that the administration has seen fit to abrogate the virtual guarantee that 800 would continue to be the number of males in the graduating class," Mr. Bushnell said.

"Co-education has ruined the mystique and the camaraderies that used to exist," Mr. Jones added. "Princeton has now given into the fad of the moment, and I think it's going to prove to be a very unfortunate thing."

...

Alumni response to the equal-access decision may offer a reliable gauge of CAP's influence among the university's graduates. The changing composition of the undergraduate population concerns many Princeton alumni, especially those who cherish memories of a relatively homogenous student body. Both supporters and critics of the new policy have initiated extensive campaigns to publicize their arguments.

CAP leaders trace this year's 10 per cent decline in gift-giving to alumni disaffection that emerged during an era of liberalization, an era that reached its culmination in the equal-access decision.

"Annual giving has been hurt very substantially by the equal-access vote," Mr. Jones said. "And it will be hurt more next year as more people find out about it. For many alumni, it was the last straw."

– The New York Times, March 3, 1974.

== Alito hearings ==
During Alito's Senate confirmation hearings following his nomination to the Supreme Court, CAP attracted attention because of its public stance against affirmative action and co-education at Princeton. Members of the Senate Judiciary Committee who were questioning Alito suggested that his involvement in this group could shed some light on his stance on minority and women's rights issues which might come before him if he were to be confirmed as an Associate Justice on the Supreme Court of the United States, which he subsequently was.

The result of an extensive search of CAP documentation demanded by Ted Kennedy on January 11, 2006, was that no mention of or connection to Sam Alito was found.

== Reaction by undergraduates, faculty, and staff ==
CAP appears to have been treated as a nuisance or danger by some of the Princeton community contemporaneous to its most active period. Faculty members were wary of participating in a CAP-sponsored political survey. CAP was mocked by the school's band, and the university's chaplain in 1973 defended himself against charges from CAP of radicalism for his involvement in supporting draft dodging.

== See also ==
- Bruin Alumni Association
