= Doe v. Groody =

Lawsuit

- Court: United States Court of Appeals for the Third Circuit
- Decided: October 10, 1990
- Citation: 361 F.3d 232 (3rd Cir. 2004)

Court membership
- Judges sitting: Samuel Alito, Thomas L. Ambro, Michael Chertoff

Case opinions
- Majority: Chertoff, joined by Ambro
- Dissent: Alito

The Doe v. Groody, 361 F.3d 232 (3d Cir. 2004) lawsuit concerned a strip-search of a 10-year-old girl and her mother despite the fact that neither were criminal suspects nor named in any search warrant. In applying for a search warrant, officers requested the right to search whoever was in the house and were refused that request.

== Background ==
The Schuylkill County, Pennsylvania Drug Task Force suspected the husband and father of the plaintiffs of selling methamphetamines so they procured a search warrant for him, the house, his car and anyone customers that were present. The wife and daughter were not listed as suspects. When the police were executing the warrant, they had a female parking enforcement officer take the wife and daughter to the bathroom and perform a strip search but no drugs were found on them. When the pair sued, the police officers claimed qualified immunity.

== Majority opinion ==
The majority opinion for the United States Court of Appeals for the Third Circuit found the search unconstitutional.

The majority opinion states in its second paragraph:

"[U]nder any reasonable reading, the warrant in this case did not authorize the search of the mother and daughter, and that the search was not otherwise justified. Accordingly, we will affirm the District Court's determination that the officers are not entitled to qualified immunity."

== Alito's dissenting opinion ==
Judge Samuel Alito wrote a dissenting opinion saying that police officers did not violate the Constitution when they strip-searched the mother and her ten-year-old daughter. Alito stated in section I of his dissent that the affidavit accompanying the warrant "...seeks permission to search all occupants of the residence..." and argues, again in section I, that "The warrant indisputably incorporated the affidavit..."

Judge Michael Chertoff’s majority opinion asserted that Alito’s position would effectively nullify the Fourth Amendment’s warrant requirement and “transform the judicial officer into little more than the cliché rubber stamp.”

Media attention on the case and Alito's opinion grew when he was nominated by President George W. Bush to the Supreme Court in 2005. Opponents pointed to his opinion to support claims that Alito would try to overturn Fourth Amendment precedents if confirmed to the Court.

== Sources ==
- Works related to Doe v. Groody at Wikisource
- Text of Doe v. Groody, 361 F.3d 232 (3d Cir. 2004) is available from: CourtListener Justia OpenJurist Google Scholar
