= Pennsylvania Department of Community and Economic Development =

Agency overview
- Jurisdiction: State government of Pennsylvania
- Agency executive: Rick Siger, Secretary of Community and Economic Development
- Website: www.newpa.com

Pennsylvania Department of Community and Economic Development is a cabinet-level state agency in Pennsylvania. The mission of the department is to enhance investment opportunities for businesses and to improve the quality of life for residents. The department works to attract outside corporations, spur expansion of existing local employers, and foster start-ups by providing tax incentives and technical assistance. Additionally, the agency provides grant funding to community groups and local governments for projects such as revitalizing "Main Street" infrastructure, enhancing low income housing availability, or improving access to technology.

== Act 58 ==
The department was created by the Community and Economic Development Enhancement Act (Act of Jun. 27, 1996, P.L. 403, No. 58) , merging the Departments of Commerce and of Community Affairs. The incumbent secretary of commerce, Thomas B. Hagen, became the first secretary of the new department.

== Act 47 ==
The Financially Distressed Municipalities Act (Act of 1987, P.L. 246, No. 47), also known as Act 47, empowers the Pennsylvania Department of Community and Economic Development to declare certain municipalities in Pennsylvania as financially distressed. Philadelphia and Pittsburgh are subject to separate state authorities, rather than this department.

== Pennsylvania Manufacturing Week ==
In 2015, the DCED created the Pennsylvania Manufacturing Week to complement National Manufacturing Day on October 7. The event, for the past two years, has run from October 1 to October 7. The goal is to highlight the good paying jobs available in manufacturing across multiple sectors.

== Commonwealth Financing Authority ==
Established in 2004, the Commonwealth Financing Authority (CFA) is an independent agency within the DCED tasked with administering the stimulus package. The CFA holds fiduciary responsibility over programs and investments in PA. It consists of seven board members, four legislative appointees, and the Office of the Budget and the Department of Banking. Project approval requires five affirmative votes, four of which from legislative appointees.

== Governor's Center for Local Government Service's ==
The Governor's Center for Local Government Service's provides financial and technical support to localities looking to improve city planning, regionalize their police service, or increase accountability in their spending.

== Early Intervention Program ==
The Early Intervention Program (EIP) provides matching grant funds to assist municipalities experiencing financial difficulties. The program assists local government in setting multi- year financial plans and establish short and long term financial goals. The EIP will cover 50% of a project cost up to $200,000.

== Pennsylvania Capital Access Program (PennCAP) ==
PennCAP is a loan guarantee program through qualifying banks of up to $500,000. The loans are to be used for all local businesses with capital need.

=== Participating Banks ===
Huntington Bank, Enterprise Development Fund of Erie County (Erie and surrounding counties only), and AgChoice Farm Credit (only agricultural projects).

== See also ==
- Chittister v. Department of Community & Economic Development
- Financially Distressed Municipalities Act
- Pennsylvania Intergovernmental Cooperation Authority, applying to Philadelphia
- Pittsburgh Intergovernmental Cooperation Authority
